= The Remixes (Mariah Carey album) =

Remix album by Mariah Carey
- Released: June 25, 2003
- Genres: Dance; house; club; pop; hip hop; R&B
- Length: 140:15
- Labels: MonarC; Columbia; Sony
- Producers: David Morales; Mariah Carey; Junior Vasquez; Robert Clivillés; David Cole; Hex Hector; Mac Quayle; Dave Hall; Jermaine Dupri; DJ Clue; Ken Duro Ifill; Stevie J; Sean Combs; Clark Kent; Damizza; Rick Rock; Darren Rapp

Mariah Carey chronology
| Charmbracelet (2002) | The Remixes (2003) | The Emancipation of Mimi (2005) |

The Remixes is the first remix album by American singer-songwriter Mariah Carey, released on June 25, 2003, by Columbia Records. It mainly compiles remixed versions of Carey's songs, featuring club mixes on the first disc and hip-hop collaborations and remixes on the second.

The Remixes is a two-disc compilation album by Carey that blends various genres, including dance, pop, and R&B. The first disc is oriented toward the dancefloor, featuring club remixes that draw from disco, house, gospel, electronica, and techno, while the second disc highlights Carey's hip-hop collaborations, some of which are original versions rather than remixes. Among the notable tracks is "I Know What You Want", a duet with Busta Rhymes originally released on his album It Ain't Safe No More..., as well as two remixes that were previously exclusive to the Japanese market: the So So Def remix of "The One" and "Miss You" featuring Jadakiss, both initially recorded during the Charmbracelet era. Licensing for the album involved material from three of Carey's record labels—Columbia, Virgin, and Island—as well as J Records for "I Know What You Want."

Upon release, The Remixes received mixed critical reactions. Some reviewers regarded it as a more compelling offering than a standard greatest hits compilation, praising the new interpretations and the scope of styles represented across both discs. Others, however, perceived it as a calculated commercial move aimed at repackaging old material. The dance-oriented first disc drew divided opinions: while some critics felt that the production, particularly from David Morales, remained fresh and complemented Carey's vocals, others found the beats repetitive or dated, questioning the creative value of the remix process. The hip-hop disc was equally polarizing. Some applauded the synergy between Carey and her guest rappers, highlighting songs like "Breakdown", "Fantasy", and "Loverboy" as standout examples of cross-genre chemistry, while others criticized the features as underwhelming or ineffective. Reviewers generally agreed that the album catered more to long-time fans than to casual listeners, with some noting that the remixes lacked the energy or substance to stand on their own. Still, certain tracks were praised for making bold departures from their original versions, and Carey's decision to re-record her vocals for many of the remixes was viewed by some as a mark of dedication.

Commercially, the album debuted at number 26 on the Billboard 200 with over 40,000 units sold in its first week—lower than her ninth studio album Charmbracelet, but a stronger showing than her previous compilation Greatest Hits. Despite spending only five weeks on the main album chart, it found greater success on the genre-specific Top Electronic Albums chart, where it held the number one position for two months. By April 2005, US sales had reached over 200,000 copies, climbing to nearly 290,000 by 2018. In October 2019, the album was certified Gold by the RIAA, a milestone adjusted for its double-disc format, which counts each disc toward certification thresholds. Internationally, The Remixes reached the top forty in markets including New Zealand, South Korea, and the United Kingdom.

== Background and release ==
Following the demise of her marriage with Sony Music CEO Tommy Mottola after the release of her sixth studio album Butterfly (1997), American singer Mariah Carey negotiated her exit from record label Columbia in exchange for the release of four albums: #1's (1998; her first greatest hits album), Rainbow (1999; her seventh studio album), Greatest Hits (2001; her second greatest hits album), and The Remixes (2003; her first remix album). By the time of the latter's release, Mottola had resigned from Sony Music and Carey was consequently more creatively involved in the album than Greatest Hits, for which she admitted not knowing of its impending release in 2001. In a 2003 interview with the Scripps Howard News Service, Carey summed up The Remixes' release as "a contractual Sony thing". However, Carey told The Hollywood Reporter she had always wanted to put out a remix album and reflected positively about its tracklist.

The Remixes received a staggered release worldwide as a cassette and compact disc. Sony Music Japan International released the album in Japan on June 25, 2003, to correspond with Carey's Charmbracelet World Tour dates in that country. While a United States release was scheduled for the previous day, Columbia Records delayed the album multiple times to July 1, August 5, and September 2, before releasing it on October 14. Elsewhere, The Remixes was released on October 6 in the United Kingdom, October 14 in Taiwan, October 21 in Canada, October 24 in South Korea, and November 3 in Australia.

== Composition ==
The Remixes is a dance, pop, and R&B album. Disc one features songs with disco, electronica, gospel, house, and techno influences, while disc two contains hip-hop collaborations with rappers. The album features Carey's duet with Busta Rhymes, "I Know What You Want" (2003), originally recorded for Rhymes' album It Ain't Safe No More. It also includes two tracks previously only available in Japan: the So So Def Remix of "The One", a canceled single from Carey's Charmbracelet (2002) album; and the remix of "Miss You" featuring Jadakiss, which was originally recorded for Charmbracelet and samples "It's All About the Benjamins", which featured Jadakiss as part of The Lox alongside Diddy, Lil' Kim and The Notorious B.I.G.

Five of the tracks on disc two – "Breakdown" (1997), "Sweetheart" (1998), "Crybaby" (1999), "Miss You" and "I Know What You Want" – are not remixes at all. All three of Carey's record labels – Columbia Records, Virgin Records and Island Records – agreed to license tracks for the album, while "I Know What You Want" was licensed from J Records.

== Critical reception ==
The Remixes ratings
Review scores
| Source | Rating |
|---|---|
| AllMusic | 4/5 stars |
| Boston Herald | 3.5/4 stars |
| Dayton Daily News | B |
| Deseret News | 1.5/4 stars |
| The Encyclopedia of Popular Music | 3/5 stars |
| New Straits Times | 2/5 stars |
| The Plain Dealer | C |
| The Province | 3/5 stars |
| The Rolling Stone Album Guide | 3/5 stars |
| Slant Magazine | 3/5 stars |

Music critics opined on the release of a remix album and the remixes themselves. Kevin C. Johnson of the St. Louis Post-Dispatch considered a remix album better than another greatest hits compilation, the Malay Mail's Yushaimi Yahaya said it was "a commercial strategy to sell old songs", and R. S. Murthi of the New Straits Times felt it indicated Carey was "desperate to boost flagging sales". Reviewing for Slant Magazine, Sal Cinquemani thought Carey's enthusiasm for the project disproved the latter's notions. He viewed the album as suited to dedicated fans rather than general audiences, as did Yahaya and Billboard's Michael Paoletta. Apart from "Emotions", Scott Iwasaki of the Deseret News considered the remixes "just as boring as the originals". In contrast, Johnson felt the remixes enhanced Carey's songs as they "lacked flavor" in their original forms. Tom Harrison of The Province said some songs make "radical departures" from the originals. AllMusic's William Ruhlmann agreed, stating, "in many cases, the songs as initially heard are virtually unrecognizable".

Reviewers wrote about both the dance and hip-hop discs. Derek Ali of the Dayton Daily News described the first as monotonous and The Denver Post's Elana Ashanti Jefferson questioned whether "the remix process entailed adding stale house beats and club sirens." Cinquemani thought some songs sound dated but praised Carey for re-recording her vocals. In contrast, Paoletta felt David Morales's production on disc one "remains fresh and alive" and New York Times music critic Kelefa Sanneh considered it complementary of Carey's voice. Sanneh thought disc two songs remixed by Jermaine Dupri were of lesser quality and chose "Breakdown" and "Miss You" as highlights for the dynamic between Carey and rappers. Jefferson thought the "vast pool of talent and influence" that went into producing tracks on disc two made the album worth more than one listen. Referencing the samples and rappers present, Ali chose "Fantasy", "Thank God I Found You", and "Loverboy" as highlights from disc two while Johnson selected "Loverboy", "My All/Stay Awhile", "Breakdown", and "Always Be My Baby". Murthi disagreed, writing that the rappers failed to enhance the songs.

== Commercial performance ==
The Remixes sold 40,687 copies in its first week of release in the United States. It debuted and peaked at number twenty-six on the Billboard 200 albums chart, lower than the number three peak of her previous album Charmbracelet but higher than her prior compilation album Greatest Hits, which peaked at number fifty-two. The album spent a total of five weeks on the chart, the lowest of Carey's career at the time. It experienced greater success on the genre-specific Top Electronic Albums chart, where it spent two months at number one. By April 2005, The Remixes had sold 205,000 units in the United States according to Nielsen SoundScan. In November 2018, the album reached 289,000 sales. The Recording Industry Association of America certified it gold in October 2019. As a double album over 100 minutes long, it achieved Gold status after it sold 250,000 equivalent units instead of the standard 500,000 because its discs are counted separately for certification purposes.

Elsewhere, The Remixes peaked within the top forty of national album charts in New Zealand, South Korea, and the United Kingdom.

== Track listing ==
Tracks and composition details adapted from the album's liner notes. Track lengths adapted from Sony Music Entertainment via Jaxsta.

Disc 1
| No. | Title | Writer(s) | Producer(s) | Length |
|---|---|---|---|---|
| 1. | "My All" (Morales "My" Club Mix) | Mariah Carey; Walter Afanasieff | David Morales | 7:08 |
| 2. | "Heartbreaker/If You Should Ever Be Lonely" (Junior's Heartbreaker Club Mix) | Carey; Val Young; Frederick Jenkins | Carey; Junior Vasquez | 10:18 |
| 3. | "Fly Away (Butterfly Reprise)" (Fly Away Club Mix) | Carey; Morales; Bernie Taupin; Elton John | Morales; Satoshi Tomiie^{A} | 9:50 |
| 4. | "Anytime You Need a Friend" (C+C Club Version) | Carey; Afanasieff | Robert Clivillés; David Cole; Carey | 10:50 |
| 5. | "Fantasy" (Def Club Mix) | Carey; Tina Weymouth; Chris Frantz; Dave Hall; Adrian Belew; Steven Stanley | Morales | 11:14 |
| 6. | "Honey" (Classic Mix) | Carey; Morales; Bobby Robinson; Mohandas Dewese | Carey^{C}; Morales^{C}; Tomiie^{A} | 8:05 |
| 7. | "Dreamlover" (Def Club Mix) | Carey; D. Hall | Morales | 10:43 |
| 8. | "Emotions" (12" Club Mix) | Carey; D. Cole; Clivillés | D. Cole; Clivillés | 5:57 |
| 9. | "Through the Rain" (HQ2 Radio Edit) | Carey; Lionel Cole | Hex Hector; Mac Quayle | 4:09 |
| Total length: | | | | 78:14 |

Disc 2
| No. | Title | Writer(s) | Producer(s) | Length |
|---|---|---|---|---|
| 1. | "Fantasy" (featuring Ol' Dirty Bastard) | Carey; Russell Jones; D. Hall; Frantz; Weymouth; Belew; Stanley | Carey; D. Hall | 4:50 |
| 2. | "Always Be My Baby" (Mr. Dupri Mix featuring Da Brat and Xscape) | Carey; Jermaine Dupri; Manuel Seal; James Harris III; Terry Lewis | Dupri; Carey | 4:40 |
| 3. | "My All/Stay Awhile" (So So Def Remix featuring Lord Tariq and Peter Gunz) | Carey; Afanasieff; Carl McIntosh; Jane Eugene; Steve Nichol | Dupri; Carl-So-Lowe^{C} | 4:43 |
| 4. | "Thank God I Found You" (Make It Last Remix featuring Joe and Nas) | Carey; J. Harris III; Lewis; Teddy Riley; Keith Sweat | DJ Clue; Ken Duro Ifill; Carey | 5:09 |
| 5. | "Breakdown" (featuring Krayzie Bone and Wish Bone) | Sean Combs; Carey; Anthony Henderson; Charles Scruggs; Steve Jordan | Carey; Stevie J; Combs | 4:44 |
| 6. | "Honey" (So So Def Mix featuring Da Brat and Jermaine Dupri) | Carey; Ronald Larkins; Larry Price; Malcolm McLaren; Berry Gordy; Freddie Perren; Alphonso Mizell; Deke Richards; Stephen Hague; Robinson; Dewese | Dupri; Seal^{C} | 5:11 |
| 7. | "Loverboy" (Remix featuring Da Brat, Ludacris, Twenty II and Shawnna) | Carey; Shawntae Harris; Christopher Bridges; Rashawnna Guy; P.D. Jones; Larry Blackmon; Tomi Jenkins | Clark Kent; Carey | 4:29 |
| 8. | "Heartbreaker" (Remix featuring Da Brat and Missy Elliott) | Carey; S. Harris; Elliott; Ricardo Brown; Calvin Broadus; Nathaniel Hale; Warren Griffin III; Andre Young | DJ Clue; Carey; Ifill | 4:36 |
| 9. | "Sweetheart" (featuring Jermaine Dupri) | Rainy Davis; Peter Kessler | Dupri; Carey | 4:22 |
| 10. | "Crybaby" (featuring Snoop Dogg) | Carey; Broadus; Trey Lorenz; Riley; Gene Griffin; Timmy Gatling; Aaron Hall III | Damizza; Carey | 5:19 |
| 11. | "Miss You" (featuring Jadakiss) | Carey; Dupri; Bryan-Michael Cox; Jason Philips; Terry Etling; Linda Laurie | Carey; Dupri; Cox^{C} | 5:07 |
| 12. | "The One" (So So Def Remix featuring Bone Crusher) | Carey; Dupri; Wayne Hardnett; Riley; Griffin; A. Hall III; Gatling | Dupri | 4:36 |
| 13. | "I Know What You Want" (Busta Rhymes and Mariah Carey featuring Flipmode Squad) | Trevor Smith; William A. Lewis; Roger McNair; Leroy Jones; Rashia Tashan Fisher; Ricardo Thomas | Rick Rock; Darren Rapp | 4:15 |
| Total length: | | | | 62:01 |

=== Notes ===
- ^{A} signifies an additional producer
- ^{C} signifies a co-producer
- ^{J} The Japanese edition omits "The One" So So Def Remix and "I Know What You Want" and instead includes "All I Want for Christmas Is You" So So Def Remix featuring Jermaine Dupri and Lil' Bow Wow
- "Heartbreaker/If You Should Ever Be Lonely" interpolates "If You Should Ever Be Lonely", written by Val Young and Frederick Jenkins
- "Fantasy" Def Club Mix and featuring Ol' Dirty Bastard sample "Genius of Love", performed by Tom Tom Club
- "Honey" Classic Mix and So So Def Mix sample "The Body Rock", performed by the Treacherous Three
- "Dreamlover" Def Club Mix samples "Blind Alley", written by David Porter
- "Always Be My Baby" Mr. Dupri Mix contains a replayed portion of "Tell Me If You Still Care", written by James Harris III and Terry Lewis
- "My All/Stay Awhile" So So Def Remix contains a replayed portion of "Stay a Little While, Child", written by Carl McIntosh, Jane Eugene, and Steve Nichol
- "Thank God I Found You" Make It Last Remix interpolates "Make It Last Forever", written by Teddy Riley and Keith Sweat
- "Honey" So So Def Mix contains a replayed portion of "Hey DJ", written by Stephen Hague
- "Honey" So So Def Mix samples "It's Great to Be Here", written by Freddie Perren, Alphonso Mizell, Berry Gordy, and Dennis Lussier
- "Loverboy" Remix contains elements from "Candy", written by Larry Blackmon and Tomi Jenkins
- "Heartbreaker" Remix contains excerpts from "Ain't No Fun (If the Homies Can't Have None)", written by Ricardo Brown, Calvin Broadus, Warren Griffin III, Andre Young, and Nathaniel Hale
- "Crybaby" contains a replayed portion of "Piece of My Love", written by Timmy Gatling, Gene Griffin, Aaron Hall III, and Riley
- "Miss You" contains elements from "I Did it for Love", written by Terry Etlinger and Linda Laurie
- "The One" So So Def Remix contains elements from "Goodbye Love", written by Riley, Griffin, Hall, and Gatling

== Charts ==
Weekly chart performance
| Chart (2003–2004) | Peak position |
|---|---|
| Australian Albums (ARIA) | 78 |
| Australian Urban Albums (ARIA) | 16 |
| Dutch Albums (Album Top 100) | 99 |
| French Albums (SNEP) | 60 |
| French Compilations (SNEP) | 30 |
| Italian Albums (FIMI) | 72 |
| Japanese Albums (Oricon) | 95 |
| New Zealand Albums (RMNZ) | 36 |
| Scottish Albums (Official Charts) | 79 |
| Swiss Albums (Schweizer Hitparade) | 69 |
| UK Albums (OCC) | 35 |
| UK R&B Albums (Official Charts) | 31 |
| US Billboard 200 | 26 |
| US Top Electronic Albums (Billboard) | 1 |
| US Top R&B/Hip-Hop Albums (Billboard) | 25 |

Weekly chart performance
| Chart (2006) | Peak position |
|---|---|
| UK R&B Albums (Official Charts) | 36 |

Monthly chart performance
| Chart (2003) | Peak position |
|---|---|
| South Korean Albums (RIAK) | 9 |

Year-end chart performance
| Chart (2003) | Position |
|---|---|
| US Top Electronic Albums (Billboard) | 5 |

Year-end chart performance
| Chart (2004) | Position |
|---|---|
| US Top Electronic Albums (Billboard) | 8 |

== Certifications ==
Certifications and sales for The Remixes
| Region | Certification | Certified units/sales |
|---|---|---|
| New Zealand (RMNZ) | Gold | 7,500^{‡} |
| South Korea | — | 7,010 |
| United States (RIAA) | Gold | 289,000 |
^{‡} Sales+streaming figures based on certification alone.
