= My Saving Grace =

2002 song by Mariah Carey

Song by Mariah Carey

from the album Charmbracelet
- Released: December 3, 2002
- Studio: Capri Digital Studios (Capri, Italy); Right Track Studios (New York, NY)
- Genre: Gospel
- Length: 4:09
- Label: MonarC; Island
- Composers: Mariah Carey; Kenneth Crouch; Trevor Lawrence; Randy Jackson
- Lyricist: Mariah Carey
- Producers: Randy Jackson; Mariah Carey

Audio
- "My Saving Grace" on YouTube

"My Saving Grace" is a song by the American singer Mariah Carey from her ninth studio album, Charmbracelet (2002). Carey co-wrote and co-produced the song with Kenneth Crouch, Trevor Lawrence, and its other producer, Randy Jackson. It became available as the album's eighth track on December 3, 2002, when it was released by Monarc Entertainment and Island Records. It is a gospel ballad. In album reviews of Charmbracelet, "My Saving Grace" was often more warmly received than the rest of the album and was generally well-liked. Carey included the song on the set list of her 2003-2004 headlining concert tour, Charmbracelet World Tour.

== Background ==
In 2000, Carey went her separate ways from the record label Columbia Records and signed a $100 million five-album recording contract with Virgin Records America, courting significant media attention. Carey had believed and often said that Columbia regarded her as a commodity, with her separation from ex-husband Tommy Mottola complicating her relationship with the label. Later, in July 2001, Carey had suffered a physical and emotional breakdown. Potentially due to this reason, Virgin and 20th Century Fox delayed the release of Carey's film Glitter, as well as its soundtrack. Both the releases were received negatively by critics and did not replicate Carey's previous commercial success. Carey's deal with Virgin was soon bought out for $50 million. Carey flew to Capri, Italy for a period of five months, in which she began to conceptualize a new album, stemming from uproars in her personal life the previous year. Later that year, she signed a contract with Island Records, valued at more than $24 million, and launched the record label MonarC. Further worsening Carey's emotional problems, her father, with whom she had little contact since childhood, died of cancer that year.

"My Saving Grace" premiered exclusively on AOL Music's First Listen on November 25, 2002. Her ninth studio album, Charmbracelet, was released soon after, on December 3, 2002.

== Composition ==
"My Saving Grace" is four minutes and nine seconds long. Jackson and Carey produced the song. Crouch played keyboards, Michael Thompson played guitar, Trevor Lawrence Jr. played drums, L. Cole played double bass, and John Mitchell provided drum programming. Dana Chappelle handled engineering with assistance from Jay Spears, Manuel Farolfi, and Giuilo Antognini. Mick Guzauski mixed it.

Billboard's Larry Flick described "My Saving Grace" as one of the more uplifting songs on Charmbracelet, which was "gospel-flavored". Eric R. Danton of the Daily Press wrote: "The singer seems to address her personal turmoil on a few tunes. Carey sings about finding strength to carry on with the gospel- tinged piano ballad 'My Saving Grace'." Greg Kot of the Chicago Tribune called it a "big [...] Gospel-flavored" ballad.

== Critical reception ==
In album reviews of Charmbracelet, "My Saving Grace" was generally more warmly received than the rest of the album. For The Washington Post, Joshua Klein wrote that the song "incorporates elements of gospel, a much more palatable use of Carey's virtuoso voice than the flights of high-pitched dolphin-speak she sometimes squeaks out". The Malay Mail's Adrian Curtis lauded Carey for producing it, believing that it could "stand up well" to "Through the Rain" and "Yours", two other Charmbracelet tracks, that were produced by Jimmy Jam and Terry Lewis. Commenting that Charmbracelet was "solid but not as definitive as Butterfly", Herald Sun's Cyclone Wehner wrote that Carey "predictably [...] pulled off "My Saving Grace", which he described as a "melodramatic ballad". Similarly, Tom Moon of the Philadelphia Inquirer thought that Carey was "less forthright" on the album despite him liking "My Saving Grace", which he described as a "routine attempt at gospel". Jeff Hurst of Cambridge Times wrote: "Carey still has one of the most incredible voices in the business. And she shows it off with songs like Yours and My Saving Grace. But there's just so much stuff getting in the way of her vocal beauty."

Writing for the New Straits Times, a critic thought "My Saving Grace" took "a page out of Whitney Houston's songbook" and was "a song [Carey will] be using for years to come on TV and in concert". The Houston Chronicle's Michael D. Clark wrote that "the reverberating vocals she leads on My Saving Grace sound like a church group rehearsing in a cathedral". In a study, scholar Julia L. Johnson Connor grouped "My Saving Grace" among "Can't Take That Away (Mariah's Theme)" (1999) and "Outside" (1997) as songs in which Carey discussed being biracial.

== Live performances ==
"My Saving Grace" appeared on the set list of Carey's 2003-2004 headlining concert tour, Charmbracelet World Tour. During the performances, childhood photos and press clippings which reflected the theme of "Triumph" were projected on the screen.

== Credits and personnel ==
Credits are adapted from the liner notes of Charmbracelet.

- Randy Jackson – producer, songwriter, composer
- Mariah Carey – producer, songwriter, composer
- Trevor Lawrence – songwriter, composer
- Kenneth Crouch – keyboards, songwriter, composer
- Michael Thompson – guitar
- Dana Chappelle – engineer
- John Mitchell – drum programming
- Mick Guzauski – mixing
- Jay Spears – assistant recording engineer
- Trevor Lawrence Jr. – drums
- L. Cole – double bass
- Manuel Farolfi – assistant recording engineer
- Giuilo Antognini – assistant recording engineer

== Works cited ==
  - Johnson Connor, Julia L. (2004). Seeking 'Free Spaces Unbound': Six "Mixed" Female Adolescents Transact with Literature Depicting Biracial Characters (PhD thesis). University of Illinois Urbana-Champaign. ProQuest 305192804.
