= Jerry Blair =

American music industry executive (1961–2021)

- Born: Jerrold H. Blair; April 9, 1961; New Haven, Connecticut, U.S.
- Died: September 8, 2021 (aged 60); Stamford, Connecticut, U.S.
- Education: Brandeis University (BA); Boston University School of Law (JD)
- Occupation: Music industry executive
- Years active: 1983–2021
- Spouse: Karen Blair
- Children: 2

Jerrold "Jerry" H. Blair (April 9, 1961 – September 8, 2021) was an American music industry executive. He served as Executive Vice President of Promotion at Columbia Records and Sony Music Entertainment during the 1990s. He worked on radio promotion campaigns for major recording artists and was associated with the commercial expansion of several high-profile pop and R&B releases during that period.

== Early life and education ==
Blair was born in New Haven, Connecticut. He graduated from Brandeis University in 1982 with a Bachelor of Arts degree and later earned a Juris Doctor degree from the Boston University School of Law. While attending law school, he began working in the music industry as a college representative for CBS Records in New England, focusing on campus radio promotion.

== Career ==
=== Chrysalis Records ===
Blair joined Chrysalis Records in 1986, working in radio promotion and marketing under executive Daniel Glass. He was involved in regional promotional campaigns for artists on the label’s roster.

=== Columbia Records and Sony Music ===
In 1988, Blair joined Columbia Records as Senior Vice President of Promotion after being recruited by Tommy Mottola. He later became Executive Vice President of the Columbia Records Group and oversaw national and field radio promotion operations.

During his tenure, Blair worked on promotional campaigns for artists including Mariah Carey, The Fugees, Lauryn Hill, Destiny's Child, Will Smith, Billy Joel, and Bruce Springsteen.

He was also involved in promotional efforts for Ricky Martin during the artist’s crossover success in the late 1990s. Variety noted his association with Latin pop crossover promotion during this period, including artists such as Jennifer Lopez and Marc Anthony.

Blair also worked on the promotion of Aerosmith’s 1998 single “I Don't Want to Miss a Thing,” which became the band’s first number-one single on the Billboard Hot 100.

=== Arista Records ===
In 2000, Blair left Columbia Records to join Arista Records as Executive Vice President under L.A. Reid. His departure resulted in a contractual dispute between Sony Music and Arista’s parent company, BMG Entertainment, which was later resolved through a settlement.

At Arista, Blair oversaw non-urban promotion and marketing functions and participated in the label’s promotional strategy development. He remained with the company until 2001.

=== MonarC Entertainment ===
In 2002, Blair became president of MonarC Entertainment, an imprint associated with Mariah Carey and Island Def Jam Music Group. He oversaw marketing and promotional activities related to Carey's 2002 album Charmbracelet. The imprint was discontinued in 2004.

=== Later career and politics ===
Following his work at MonarC Entertainment, Blair worked in artist management, consulting, and entertainment marketing.

In 2009, he founded Global Entertainment Management, a consulting firm focused on the entertainment industry.

In 2021, Blair was a candidate for the Stamford Board of Representatives in Stamford, Connecticut.

== Death ==
Blair died at his home in Stamford, Connecticut, on September 8, 2021, from complications related to COVID-19. He was 60 years old. He was survived by his wife and two children.

== Reception and legacy ==
Following his death, Blair was described in industry publications as a long-time radio promotion executive who worked on major recording industry campaigns during the 1990s and early 2000s.

Billboard described him as a “superstar promo executive” and highlighted his work on radio promotion campaigns for major pop and R&B artists during his tenure at Columbia Records.

Variety noted his involvement in promotion campaigns for artists including Ricky Martin and other Columbia Records acts, and referenced his role during the period of Latin pop crossover expansion in the U.S. music market.

The Connecticut Post noted his long career in the music industry and his later business and political activity in Stamford, Connecticut.
