= Clown (Mariah Carey song) =

2002 song by Mariah Carey

Song by Mariah Carey

from the album Charmbracelet
- Released: November 20, 2002
- Studio: Capri Digital Studios (Capri, Italy); Right Track Studios (New York City); The Studio (Philadelphia)
- Length: 3:17
- Label: Island
- Composers: Mariah Carey; Andre Harris; Vidal Davis; Mary Ann Tatum
- Lyricist: Mariah Carey
- Producers: Dre & Vidal; Mariah Carey

Audio
- "Clown" on YouTube

"Clown" is a song recorded by American singer Mariah Carey for her ninth studio album Charmbracelet (2002). She wrote the track with Andre Harris, Vidal Davis, and Mary Ann Tatum, and produced it with Dre & Vidal. (Note: Dre & Vidal is the collective name of Andre Harris and Vidal Davis) "Clown" is an answer song to the comments that rapper Eminem made about Carey in the media and on the 2002 track "Superman". In the lyrics, Carey denies rumors that their 2001 relationship was romantic and expresses regret that it occurred. She likens Eminem to a liar, a puppet, and a clown whose private personality contradicts his public image.

"Clown" received analysis from scholars who thought Carey was contending that Eminem's masculine persona was fake. Music critics considered the song a highlight from Charmbracelet and gave its production mixed reviews. They compared it to Carly Simon's "You're So Vain" (1972), Nas's "Ether" (2001), Justin Timberlake's "Cry Me a River" (2002), and the Pet Shop Boys' "The Night I Fell in Love" (2002). During the Charmbracelet World Tour, Carey performed "Clown" while puppeteers controlled an Eminem look-alike on stage.

== Background and release ==
American singer Mariah Carey suffered an emotional and physical breakdown in 2001. Ensuing media coverage included rumors about a purported romantic relationship gone awry with rapper Eminem. The following year, he alluded to them in The Eminem Show song "Superman". In it, Eminem disses Carey by saying he ended their relationship because she wanted a strong partnership before having sex. He expounded in an appearance on the television program Access Hollywood: "The Mariah thing, yeah, that's true. Those rumors are true, and I'm not going to deny them. You know, we had somewhat of a relationship."

In 2002, Eminem spoke of Carey to Rolling Stone: "I don't want to say anything disrespectful because I respect her as a singer, but on the whole personal level, I'm not really feeling it. I just don't like her as a person." Carey retorted in a Dateline NBC interview: "Well, it didn't seem like that for a while, but OK. If it makes him comfortable to say that, then that's great." She responded further with the answer song "Clown", which Island Records released on November 20, 2002, as the seventh track on her ninth studio album Charmbracelet. Carey denied an intimate relationship with Eminem while promoting the album, telling USA Today, "I can still count on less than five fingers the number of men I've gone there with. And believe me, he isn't one of them."

== Composition and lyrics ==
"Clown"
"Clown" features Carey answering Eminem complemented by vocal harmonies and an acoustic guitar.

Carey wrote "Clown" with Andre Harris, Vidal Davis, and Mary Ann Tatum, (Note: Tatum had been a background singer for Carey since Butterfly (1997) and was a close friend during her 2001 breakdown.) and produced it with the Philadelphia-based duo Dre & Vidal. Dana Jon Chappelle and John Smeltz engineered the track at Capri Studio in Capri, Italy; Right Track Studios in New York City; and The Studio in Philadelphia. Manuel Farolfi and Giulio Antognini assisted them in Capri, Paul Gregory and Dave Perini in New York, and Vince Dilorenzo in Philadelphia. Harris, Davis, and Smeltz mixed "Clown" and Bob Ludwig conducted mastering at Gateway in Portland, Maine. It features background vocals by Carey and Trey Lorenz and lasts for three minutes and seventeen seconds. An acoustic guitar and vocal harmonies characterize the composition, over which Carey sings in a rhythmic rap-influenced fashion.

"Clown" is the first song in which Carey alludes to a feud and aligns with a pattern of her musical output becoming more personal over time. It is an answer song that addresses Eminem's comments about their relationship in "Superman". (Note: Carey has not acknowledged that "Clown" is about Eminem. When asked about the song by USA Today, she stated: "I've known a lot of clowns. I've known a circus full of them.") Expressing regret that it occurred and denying that it was romantic, Carey alleges Eminem lied about their time together: "You should've never intimated we were lovers / When you know very well / We never even touched each other". She posits him as a crying clown with shrouded sadness whose private life contradicts his public persona. Carey justifies this proposition by referring to her experiences with him. During the chorus, she describes Eminem as a transitory figure whose popularity will soon decline: "Who's gonna care when the novelty's over / When the star of the show isn't you anymore". Toward the end of the song, Carey labels him a puppet being pulled by strings and references his fraught maternal relationship. (Note: According to Vincent Stephens, the latter is a reference to "Eminem's well-publicised legal disputes and emotional resentment toward his mother infantilising the rapper and rhetorically trapping him in a childhood characterised by a domineering mother".)

"Clown" received several scholarly analyses. In her book Eminem: The Real Slim Shady, Marcia Alesan Dawkins writes: "Carey is saying that Eminem's masculinity is a performance within and by the rap genre, and that it is based on a false foundation". Vincent Stephens argues in a Popular Music journal article that the lyrics are notable because "they highlight an unusual depth of contradiction between Eminem's public masculinist rhetoric and his demure private self", which negates the hip-hop culture of authenticity. He suggests these notions are heightened because Carey is a female pop singer "representing social identities that hypermasculinity, genderphobia and sexism typically affect".

== Critical reception ==
Music critics contrasted "Clown" to other songs on Charmbracelet. They viewed it as one of the better tracks (Note: Specifically Craig Seymour of The Atlanta Journal-Constitution, Melissa Ruggieri of the Richmond Times-Dispatch, and Tom Sinclair of Entertainment Weekly) and one of the few whose lyrics carry any verve. (Note: Specifically Evelyn McDonnell of the Miami Herald, Jim Farber of the New York Daily News, Randy Lewis of the Los Angeles Times, and Chris Salmon of Time Out) Dave Ferman of The Fort Worth Star-Telegram thought "Clown" was a scant instance in which "Carey still sounds like she has something to prove". Writing in Time, Josh Tyrangiel considered the track a worthy exception to the album's theme. He summarized most of Charmbracelet as "vague allusions to her recent problems" but considered "Clown" particularly candid. In contrast, Scott Robinson of The Courier-Journal felt it was an unnecessary addition. The Philadelphia Inquirer critic Tom Moon regarded Carey's "rap-inspired heat" as superior to those of rappers Cam'ron and Jay-Z on the Charmbracelet tracks "Boy (I Need You)" and "You Got Me", respectively.

"Clown" was compared with similar songs by other artists. Chicago Tribune columnist Greg Kot thought the "stuttering, rapid-fire production" resembled a Destiny's Child recording. Writing for Amazon.com, Jaan Uhelszki deemed "Clown" the most "compelling musical soap opera since Carly Simon's '70s roman à clef, 'You're So Vain'", and Vibe's Lola Ogunnaike felt it equaled the impact of "Ether" (2001), a diss song by rapper Nas toward Jay-Z. Craig Seymour of The Atlanta Journal-Constitution placed the track in a pattern of 2002 relationship confession songs. He contrasted it with Justin Timberlake addressing Britney Spears in "Cry Me a River". Robinson viewed "Clown" as inferior to Timberlake's efforts. Stephens likened it to the Pet Shop Boys' "The Night I Fell in Love" (2002) as they both challenge "Eminem's genderphobia and authenticity".

The song's music and vocal production received mixed reviews. Slant Magazine's Sal Cinquemani viewed the partnership between Carey and Dre & Vidal as a cunning choice. Writing in The Province, Stuart Derdeyn dubbed "Clown" one of "the least obnoxious marriages of studio tricks and vocal histrionics" on Charmbracelet. Entertainment Weekly's Tom Sinclair described Carey's voice as "gorgeously nuanced". Author Andrew Chan complimented the combination of her "lush melodic sensibilities with contemporary hip-hop's jittery cadences". According to Evelyn McDonnell of the Miami Herald, the "verve is undermined by Carey's incessantly saccharine singing". Stephens agreed, stating that her vocal performance makes it hard to understand the song's message. He thought the music lacked intensity, as the New York Daily News' Jim Farber, who remarked the "melody matched to it is as interchangeable as most of Carey's fare". Conversely, Oggunnaike considered it pleasant.

== Live performances ==
Carey sang "Clown" during the 2003–2004 Charmbracelet World Tour following fan requests online. She performed it as part of a circus-themed act titled "The Marionette Show", a spin on The Eminem Show. As Carey sang "Clown" sitting down, two masked men in suits stood on stilts and controlled a female dancer wearing an Eminem-style wig and Detroit Pistons jersey with ribbons while dollar signs appeared on a video screen.

The live performances received generally negative reviews; some critics did not understand the Eminem references. McDonnell viewed the puppet theme as a depiction of Carey's life and felt it was unconvincing. Fiona Shepherd of The Scotsman considered the segment bewildering and Deborah Hirsch of the Orlando Sentinel said it "seemed a little random". The South Florida Sun-Sentinel's Sean Piccoli deemed the act "bad children's theater"; Chris Varias of The Cincinnati Enquirer thought it detracted from Carey by making her appear as a ringleader rather than a singer. Questioning why she chose to perform the track, The Philadelphia Inquirer's David Hiltbrand classified "Clown" as "some of her more misshapen and unpopular material".

== Credits and personnel ==
Recording

- Recorded at Capri Studio (Capri, Italy), Right Track Studios (New York City), The Studio (Philadelphia)
- Mastered at Gateway Mastering (Portland, Maine)

Personnel

- Writing – Mariah Carey, Andre Harris, Vidal Davis, Mary Ann Tatum
- Production – Dre & Vidal, Mariah Carey
- Engineering – Dana Jon Chappelle, John Smeltz
- Assistant engineering – Manuel Farolfi, Giulio Antognini, Paul Gregory, Dave Perini, Vince Dilorenzo
- Background vocals – Mariah Carey, Trey Lorenz
- Mixing – Andre Harris, Vidal Davis, John Smeltz
- Mastering – Bob Ludwig
