= It Ain't Safe No More... =

Studio album by Busta Rhymes
- Released: November 26, 2002
- Recorded: 2001–2002
- Studio: Buzz Sundworks (New York, NY); D.N.A.B. Studios (Detroit, Michigan); Soundtrack Studios (New York, NY); Studio A Recordings (Dearborn Heights, Michigan); The Enterprise Studios (Burbank, California)
- Genre: Hip-hop; R&B
- Length: 73:33
- Label: J; Flipmode; Violator
- Producer: Busta Rhymes; DJ Scratch; J Dilla; Mario Winans; Megahertz; Mr. Fingaz; Mr. Porter; the Neptunes; Rick Rock; Ric Rude; Swizz Beatz; Tetamus; True Master; Wildstyle

Busta Rhymes chronology
| Genesis (2001) | It Ain't Safe No More... (2002) | The Big Bang (2006) |

Singles from It Ain't Safe No More...
- 1. "Make It Clap" Released: October 14, 2002; 2. "I Know What You Want" Released: February 24, 2003

It Ain't Safe No More... is the sixth studio album by American rapper Busta Rhymes, released on November 26, 2002, by J Records and Busta Rhymes's Flipmode Records. It was his final album for J. The album was produced by Swizz Beatz, J Dilla, DJ Scratch, the Neptunes, and Rick Rock, among others. It features guest appearances by Mariah Carey, Sean Paul, Carl Thomas, and Spliff Star.

It Ain't Safe No More... was supported by two singles: "Make It Clap" and "I Know What You Want". The album received positive reviews from most music critics and received slow commercial success. The album debuted and peaked at number 43 on the US Billboard 200, selling 62,000 copies in its first week, but despite that, was eventually certified gold by the RIAA on January 6, 2003.

== Singles ==
The original version of "Make It Clap" (which features Spliff Star) was released to urban contemporary radio on October 14, 2002. The remix version (which features another guest, Sean Paul) was later sent to radio as the album's official lead single on January 13, 2003.

"I Know What You Want" (which features Mariah Carey and Flipmode Squad) was released as the album's second single on February 24 of that same year. It peaked at number 3 in the United States, Australia, and the United Kingdom. Rhymes' previous single, "Make It Clap," had failed to reach the top forty on the U.S. Billboard Hot 100 chart. "I Know What You Want" stayed in the top forty for twenty-one weeks, and was ranked 17 on the Hot 100 2003 year-end chart. For Carey, it was a return to form after a string of unsuccessful singles, and it became one of her biggest hits in years. Columbia Records later included it on her first remix album The Remixes (2003) and the British and Japanese reissues of Carey's ninth studio album Charmbracelet (2002).

The plot line for the video for "I Know What You Want" was continued in the video for the 2021 single "Where I Belong", in which Rhymes collaborated again with Carey.

== Critical reception ==
Professional ratings
Aggregate scores
| Source | Rating |
|---|---|
| Metacritic | 65/100 |
Review scores
| Source | Rating |
| AllMusic | 4/5 stars |
| Blender | 4/5 stars |
| Christgau's Consumer Guide | (dud) |
| Entertainment Weekly | C− |
| The Guardian | 3/5 stars |
| Q | 4/5 stars |
| RapReviews | 8.0/10 |
| The Rolling Stone Album Guide | 3.5/5 stars |
| Uncut | 3/5 stars |
| Vibe | 3.5/5 stars |

It Ain't Safe No More... received positive reviews from most music critics. At Metacritic, which assigns a normalized rating out of 100 to reviews from mainstream critics, the album received an average score of 65, based on eight reviews, which indicates "generally favorable reviews". AllMusic John Bush found that the album "continues in the vein of loose-cannon classics like 1997's When Disaster Strikes and 2001's Genesis. And when he's on, he's better than ever, too [...] Except for a few overblown performances and quasi-epic productions, It Ain't Safe No More finds Busta Rhymes with the same sure grip on his distinctive personality." Joseph Patel from Blender felt that Rhymes's "animated antics border on sensory overload, but this is some of Busta’s best work, making him perhaps the greatest show in Rap."

Caroline Sullivan, writing for The Guardian, felt that "as ever, Rhymes's attentions are divided between dire apocaplyptic predictions and an irrepressible need to play the fool, and he has included the usual complement of tongue-in-cheek japery [...] So it's Bustaness as usual, and the spectacle of him in full rasping flow is still something to behold." Less impressed, Malcolm Venable from Entertainment Weekly called It Ain't Safe No More... "a tragically mediocre album full of lackluster arrangements and inexplicably short songs. His superb cadence and lyrics are overpowered by forgettable melodies and beats that don’t matter. Even guests Mariah Carey and the Neptunes provoke shoulder shrugs. Four of 18 tracks are almost good, but the rest is hopelessly ill suited for the radio, dance hall, or any other booty-shaking venue."

== Commercial performance ==
It Ain't Safe No More... debuted and peaked at number 43 on the US Billboard 200, selling 62,000 copies in its first week. It marked Rhymes's lowest opening sales up to then and was a considerable decline from his previous effort Genesis (2001), which had moved three times that many units and bowed in seventh in its first week out. On January 6, 2003, It Ain't Safe No More... was certified Gold by the Recording Industry Association of America (RIAA). By March 2014, the album had sold 678,000 copies in the United States.

== Track listing ==
It Ain't Safe No More... track listing
| No. | Title | Writer(s) | Producer(s) | Length |
|---|---|---|---|---|
| 1. | "Intro" | Trevor Smith | Busta Rhymes | 1:46 |
| 2. | "It Ain't Safe No More..." (featuring Meka) | Smith; James Yancey | J Dilla | 3:40 |
| 3. | "What Do You Do When You're Branded" | Smith; George Spivey | DJ Scratch | 3:44 |
| 4. | "Call the Ambulance" (featuring Rampage) | Smith; Pharrell Williams; Roger McNair | The Neptunes | 3:50 |
| 5. | "We Goin' to Do It to Ya" | Smith; Dorsey Wesley | Megahertz | 2:57 |
| 6. | "What Up" | Smith; Yancey | J Dilla | 2:54 |
| 7. | "Turn Me Up Some" | Smith; Yancey | J Dilla | 3:29 |
| 8. | "Make It Clap" (featuring Spliff Star) | Smith; William Lewis; Rahiem Thomas | Rick Rock | 3:40 |
| 9. | "Take It Off (Part 2)" (featuring Meka) | Smith; Mario Winans | Mario Winans | 4:29 |
| 10. | "Taste It" | Smith; V. Edmund; R. Jones | Tetamus | 3:46 |
| 11. | "Hey Ladies" | Smith; Sean "Puffy" Combs; S. Jordan; Christopher Wallace | Wildstyle | 3:19 |
| 12. | "I Know What You Want" (featuring Mariah Carey and The Flipmode Squad) | Smith; Rah Digga; Rampage; Rick Rock; Spliff Star; L. Jones | Rick Rock | 5:24 |
| 13. | "Riot" | Smith; Denaun Porter | Mr. Porter | 3:11 |
| 14. | "Hop" | Smith; T.J. Green | Mr. Fingaz | 3:48 |
| 15. | "Together" (featuring Rah Digga) | Smith; Kasseem Dean | Swizz Beatz | 5:33 |
| 16. | "Struttin' Like a G.O.D." | Smith; Ricky Lewis | Ric Rude | 4:13 |
| 17. | "The Struggle Will Be Lost" (featuring Carl Thomas) | Smith; Carl Thomas; R. Thomas | Rick Rock | 4:43 |
| 18. | "Till It's Gone" | Smith; Kenny Gamble; D. Harris | True Master | 4:54 |
| 19. | "Make It Clap (Remix)" (featuring Sean Paul and Spliff Star) (Hidden track) | Smith; Lewis; R. Thomas; Sean Henriques | Rick Rock | 4:03 |

== Charts ==
=== Weekly charts ===
Weekly chart performance for It Ain't Safe No More...
| Chart (2002–2003) | Peak position |
|---|---|
| Canadian Albums (Nielsen SoundScan) | 85 |
| Canadian R&B Albums (Nielsen SoundScan) | 16 |
| Dutch Albums (Album Top 100) | 61 |
| French Albums (SNEP) | 50 |
| German Albums (Offizielle Top 100) | 82 |
| Swiss Albums (Schweizer Hitparade) | 70 |
| UK Albums (Official Charts) | 78 |
| UK R&B Albums (Official Charts) | 11 |
| US Billboard 200 | 43 |
| US Top R&B/Hip-Hop Albums (Billboard) | 10 |

=== Year-end charts ===
2002 year-end chart performance for It Ain't Safe No More...
| Chart (2002) | Position |
|---|---|
| Canadian R&B Albums (Nielsen SoundScan) | 136 |
| Canadian Rap Albums (Nielsen SoundScan) | 68 |

2003 year-end chart performance for It Ain't Safe No More...
| Chart (2003) | Position |
|---|---|
| US Billboard 200 | 112 |
| US Top R&B/Hip-Hop Albums (Billboard) | 29 |

== Certifications ==
Certifications and sales for It Ain't Safe No More...
| Region | Certification | Certified units/sales |
|---|---|---|
| United Kingdom (BPI) | Silver | 60,000^{*} |
| United States (RIAA) | Gold | 678,000 |
^{*} Sales figures based on certification alone.
