= Boy (I Need You) =

2002 single by Mariah Carey

- One of the alternative CD artworks

Single by Mariah Carey featuring Cam'ron

from the album Charmbracelet
- B-side: "Irresistible (West Side Connection)"; "You Got Me"
- Released: November 26, 2002
- Recorded: 2002
- Studio: Capri Digital Studio (Capri, Italy); Right Track Studios (New York, NY)
- Genre: Hip hop; R&B
- Length: 5:14
- Label: Island Def Jam; MonarC
- Songwriters: Mariah Carey; Justin Smith; Norman Whitfield; Cameron Giles
- Producers: Mariah Carey; Just Blaze

Mariah Carey singles chronology
"Through the Rain" (2002)	"Boy (I Need You)" (2002)	"I Know What You Want" (2003)

Music video
- "Boy (I Need You)" on YouTube

"Boy (I Need You)" is a song by American singer Mariah Carey, taken from her ninth studio album, Charmbracelet (2002). It was written by Carey, Justin Smith, Norman Whitfield and Cameron Giles, and produced by the former and Just Blaze. The song was released as the album's second single on November 26, 2002, by Island Def Jam and Carey's own label, MonarC Entertainment. Initially, "The One" had been chosen as the second single from the album, however, halfway through the filming of a music video for it, the singer decided to release "Boy (I Need You)" instead. Considered by Carey as one of her favorites, the track is a reworked version of rapper Cam'ron's song "Oh Boy" released earlier that year.

The song was met with generally mixed reviews from contemporary critics. Many praised Carey's versatility and considered it as one of the stand-out tracks of Charmbracelet for having a different production when compared to the others. However, the sample hook of the song was described as "annoying". The single failed to make much impact on the charts around the world; it reached number 68 on the US Billboard Hip-Hop/R&B Songs chart and number 57 on the US Hot Singles Sales chart. Elsewhere, the song reached the top-ten in Portugal, and the top-twenty in Spain and the United Kingdom, while peaking within the top-forty in Australia, Canada, the Netherlands, Ireland and New Zealand.

The music video, directed by Joseph Kahn, incorporates elements of Japanese culture and features Carey's alter-ego Bianca Storm. It was also the first time that Carey worked with Kahn in a music video, which premiered on an episode of MTV's Making the Video in 2003. Following the release of "Through the Rain", Carey embarked on several stateside, European and Asian promotional tours in support of Charmbracelet, as well as its accompanying singles. Carey performed "Boy (I Need You)" live on several television shows appearances around the world.

== Background ==
Following the heavy media coverage surrounding Carey's publicized breakdown and hospitalization, Carey's unprecedented $100 million five-album record deal with Virgin Records America (EMI Records) was bought out for $50 million. Carey later said that her time at Virgin was "a complete and total stress-fest [...] I made a total snap decision which was based on money and I never make decisions based on money. I learned a big lesson from that." Later that year, she signed a contract with Island Records, valued at more than $24 million, and launched the record label MonarC.

== Recording and release ==
"Boy (I Need You)"
A 30 second sample of "Boy (I Need You)" by Mariah Carey, features the singer interpolating verses with rapper Cam'ron before following to the chorus.

Carey started writing songs for then untitled Charmbracelet in 2002, before she signed the record deal. She decided to concentrate on "getting some much-needed rest" and traveled to Capri and moved into the studio, which she had reserved to record the album. While at Capri, Carey could focus on her writing and recording, without being subjected to any stress or pressure. According to her, she would write the songs in her apartment upstairs, and would record them at the studio downstairs, at night. Thus, most of the album was recorded in Capri although she traveled to Atlanta, New York and Philadelphia to record a few tracks. The result was that Charmbracelet was her "most personal album" she had ever made.

While Carey paved a lot of the album with slower and autobiographical ballads, she also attempted at making an album with a mixture of several different genres. According to Jon Pareles of The New York Times, the album showed off Carey's musical and vocal versatility, especially when viewing the differences in the record's first and second singles, "Ms. Carey is known for her voice, of course: she can hit high notes that barely sound human, and few singers leap around the octaves as gracefully as she does. But as she tries to regain her audience, her greatest weapon may be her versatility: Ms. Carey also knows how to make a hip-hop hit by holding back and letting the beat shine." Carey decided to work with Just Blaze after she heard the song "Oh Boy" he had produced for Cam'ron. Together they produced "Boy (I Need You)", a remake of "Oh Boy", and "You Got Me". Carey described the former as one of her favorites on the album. "It's definitely one of my favorites, 'cause I love the original. It was cool to have him out there doing his thing in such a random environment," she said. "Boy (I Need You)" was released as the second single from the album on November 26, 2002. Initially, "The One" was scheduled to be released as the second single and the music video was shot for the song. However, halfway through the filming, the track was changed to "Boy (I Need You)".

== Reception ==
"Boy (I Need You)" received mostly mixed reviews from contemporary critics. Jon Pareles of The New York Times complimented the track on its differences with most of the content on Charmbracelet. Entertainment Weekly writer Tom Sincalir said that "the herky-jerky [track], on which Cam'ron guests, [adds] some welcome energy" to the album. Michael Paoletta of Billboard considered it as one of Charmbracelet's stand-out tracks, while Slant Magazine's Sal Cinquemani said "Boy (I Need You)", along with "You Got Me", "provide further evidence that Carey should keep her rappers on the remix." Stephen Thomas Erlewine of Allmusic noted that Carey did not "completely abandon hip-hop, but whenever it rears its head on Charmbracelet, it's utterly jarring" citing the song as an example, while describing the sampled vocal hook as "annoying". Erlewine, however, selected it as a Track Pick from the album review. The single failed to make much impact on the charts around the world; it reached number 68 on the US Billboard Hip-Hop/R&B Songs chart and number 57 on the US Hot Singles Sales chart. Elsewhere, the song reached number 17 in the United Kingdom, while peaking within the top 40 in Australia, Canada, the Netherlands, Ireland and New Zealand.

== Music video ==
Carey and Cam'ron shown in anime form during the video's final scene.

Described as "Speed Racer meets Hello Kitty meets me and Cam'ron" by Carey, the video was directed by Joseph Kahn, stars actor Will Yun Lee and incorporates elements of Japanese culture and features Carey's alter-ego Bianca Storm. When asked about the music video, Kahn replied, "To me, videos aren't movies, they're their own art form-like poetry. If you're a poet, you want to make poetry." Carey also revealed that the music video marked the first time she worked with Kahn. The music video production and recording was shown in a MTV's Making the Video episode in 2003. The video was likened to a "clear extension of Janet's "Doesn't Really Matter" for its similar settings and theme of Japanese pop culture.

== Live performances ==
Following the release of "Through the Rain", Carey embarked on several stateside, European and Asian promotional tours in support of Charmbracelet, as well as its accompanying singles. Three days prior to the album's stateside release, a one-hour special titled Mariah Carey: Shining Through the Rain aired on MTV, in which Carey was interviewed and sang several songs from Charmbracelet and of her catalog. During the interview, Carey addressed rumors of her breakdown and its cause, as well as of the album and its inspiration, followed by a question and answer with fans. During the album's month of release, Carey appeared on several television talk shows, launching her promotional tour on Today, where she performed a four-song set-list at Mall of America for a crowd of over 10,000. Carey also performed the song on Top of the Pops and on The Graham Norton Show.

== Formats and track listings ==
European and French 2-track CD single

1. "Boy (I Need You)" featuring Cam’ron – 5:15
2. "Boy (I Need You)" (Remix - Radio Edit) featuring Cam’ron, Juelz Santana, Jimmy Jones and Freeway – 3:59

European CD maxi-single 1

1. "Boy (I Need You)" featuring Cam’ron – 5:15
2. "Boy (I Need You)" (Radio Edit without Rap) – 3:17
3. "Boy (I Need You)" (Topnotch TOX Mix) featuring Cam’ron – 4:21
4. "Through the Rain" (Video)

European CD maxi-single 2; French CD maxi-single

1. "Boy (I Need You)" featuring Cam’ron – 5:15
2. "Boy (I Need You)" (Remix) featuring Cam’ron, Juelz Santana, Jimmy Jones and Freeway – 5:35
3. "Boy (I Need You)" (Copenhaniacs Remix) featuring Cam’ron – 4:38
4. "Boy (I Need You)" (Video)

UK CD maxi-single 1

1. "Boy (I Need You)" (Without Rap) – 3:12
2. "Boy (I Need You)" (Panjabi Hit Squad Mix) featuring Cam’ron – 4:14
3. "Boy (I Need You)" (Copenhaniacs Remix) featuring Cam’ron – 4:38
4. "Boy (I Need You)" (Video)

UK CD maxi-single 2

1. "Boy (I Need You)" featuring Cam’ron – 5:15
2. "Boy (I Need You)" (Street Remix) featuring Cam’ron, Juelz Santana, Jimmy Jones and Freeway – 5:31
3. "Boy (I Need You)" (Topnotch L8 Mix) featuring Cam’ron – 4:11
4. "Boy (I Need You)" (Topnotch TOX Mix) featuring Cam’ron – 4:15

Australian CD maxi-single

1. "Boy (I Need You)" featuring Cam’ron – 5:15
2. "Boy (I Need You)" (Remix by The Duke & MVP from Disco Montego) – 4:04
3. "Boy (I Need You)" (Remix - Radio Edit) featuring Cam’ron, Juelz Santana, Jimmy Jones and Freeway – 3:59
4. "Through The Rain" (Maurice Joshua Remix) - 4:18
5. "Boy (I Need You)" (Video)

UK 12-inch vinyl

A1. "Boy (I Need You)" featuring Cam’ron – 5:15
A2. "Boy (I Need You)" (Street Remix) featuring Cam’ron, Juelz Santana, Jimmy Jones and Freeway – 5:31
B1. "Boy (I Need You)" (Panjabi Hit Squad Mix) featuring Cam’ron – 4:14
B2. "Boy (I Need You)" (Topnotch TOX Mix) featuring Cam’ron – 4:15

MC... Move the Crowd US 12-inch vinyl

A1. "Boy (I Need You)" featuring Cam’ron – 5:15
A2. "Irresistible (West Side Connection)" featuring Westside Connection - 5:06
A3. "You Got Me" featuring Jay-Z and Freeway - 4:23
B1. "Boy (I Need You)" (Instrumental) - 5:15
B2. "Irresistible (West Side Connection)" (Instrumental) - 4:40
B3. "You Got Me" (Instrumental) - 4:15

MC30 digital remix EP

1. "Boy (I Need You)" (Street Remix) featuring Cam’ron, Juelz Santana, Jimmy Jones and Freeway – 5:31
2. "Boy (I Need You)" (Without Rap) – 3:12
3. "Boy (I Need You)" (Remix by The Duke & MVP from Disco Montego) – 4:04
4. "Boy (I Need You)" (Panjabi Hit Squad Mix) featuring Cam’ron – 4:14
5. "Boy (I Need You)" (Copenhaniacs Remix) featuring Cam’ron – 4:38
6. "Boy (I Need You)" (Topnotch L8 Mix) featuring Cam’ron – 4:11
7. "Boy (I Need You)" (Topnotch TOX Mix) featuring Cam’ron – 4:15

== Charts ==
Weekly chart performance for "Boy (I Need You)"
Chart (2002–2003)	Peak position
Australia (ARIA)	29
Australian Urban (ARIA)	15
Belgium (Ultratip Bubbling Under Wallonia)	6
Canada (Nielsen SoundScan)	32
Europe (Eurochart Hot 100 Singles)	44
France (SNEP)	51
Germany (GfK)	73
Ireland (IRMA)	40
Netherlands (Dutch Top 40 Tipparade)	9
Netherlands (Single Top 100)	35
New Zealand (Recorded Music NZ)	45
Portugal (AFP)	7
Scottish Singles Sales (Official Charts)	32
Spain (PROMUSICAE)	19
Switzerland (Schweizer Hitparade)	78
UK Singles (Official Charts)	17
UK Hip Hop/R&B (Official Charts)	5
UK Urban Club (Music Week)	14
US Hot Singles Sales (Billboard)	57
US Hot R&B/Hip-Hop Songs (Billboard)	68
US CHR/Rhythmic (Radio & Records)	43
US Urban (Radio & Records)	49

== Release history ==
Release dates and formats for "Boy (I Need You)"
Region	Date	Format(s)	Catalog	Label(s)	Ref.
United States	November 26, 2002	12-inch vinyl	440 063 794-1	Island Def Jam; MonarC	
United States	February 3, 2003	Rhythmic contemporary radio; urban contemporary radio	ISLR 15793-2	Island Def Jam; MonarC	
Poland	March 20, 2003	CD 1	0779382	Universal Music Polska	
Poland	March 20, 2003	CD 2	0779392	Universal Music Polska	
Belgium	March 24, 2003	CD	077 9402	Def Jam	
United Kingdom	March 24, 2003	12-inch vinyl	077 928-1	Mercury	
United Kingdom	March 24, 2003	CD 1	077 928-2	Mercury	
United Kingdom	March 24, 2003	CD 2	077 927-2	Mercury	
Germany	March 31, 2003	CD	00044007793923	Island	
Canada	April 8, 2003	CD	4400779402	Island	
Australia	April 14, 2003	CD	077 909-2	Universal Music Australia	
