= I Know What You Want =

Single by Busta Rhymes and Mariah Carey featuring Flipmode Squad

from the album It Ain't Safe No More...
- Released: February 24, 2003
- Recorded: 2002
- Studio: Soundtrack Studios (New York City, New York)
- Genre: R&B; hip-hop
- Length: 4:52; 4:12 (edit)
- Label: Flipmode; J
- Songwriters: Trevor Smith Jr.; William Lewis; Rashia Fisher; Roger McNair; Leroy Jones; Ricardo Thomas
- Producer: Rick Rock

Busta Rhymes singles chronology
"Make It Clap" (2002)	"I Know What You Want" (2003)	"Fire (Yes, Yes Y'all)" (2003)

Mariah Carey singles chronology
"Boy (I Need You)" (2002)	"I Know What You Want" (2003)	"Bringin' On the Heartbreak" (2003)

Music video
- "I Know What You Want" on YouTube

"I Know What You Want" is a song by American rapper Busta Rhymes and singer Mariah Carey, featuring verses from Rhymes' group Flipmode Squad: Spliff Star, Baby Sham, Rah Digga, and Rampage. Produced by Rick Rock, it was released on February 24, 2003 as the second single from Rhymes' sixth album It Ain't Safe No More..., released on November 26, 2002.

The song became an international success, peaking at number three on the US Billboard Hot 100 chart and top three in various countries including Australia and the United Kingdom. The song stayed in the top 40 of the Hot 100 for 21 weeks and was ranked 17 on the Hot 100 year-end chart in 2003. It tied as Rhymes' highest charting song at the time and was a return to the top five for Carey following an unsuccessful period. The song was later included on Carey's first remix album The Remixes (2003) and various reissues of Carey's ninth studio album Charmbracelet (2002).

== Background and release ==
The song was released on November 26, 2002. Billboard writer Brian Garrity wrote that on "I Know What You Want," Busta Rhymes "takes an R&B turn". The song has since been sampled in the song "I Got You" by Trippie Redd, (2020) and "Where I Belong", the 2021 follow up duet by Rhymes and Carey.

== Commercial performance ==
The song charted at number three on the Billboard Hot 100, tying as Rhymes' highest charting song at the time until 2005, and Carey's first top five hit since her 2001 single, "Loverboy". The song has sold 175,000 copies in the UK.

== Music video ==
The music video was directed by Chris Robinson. It features Busta Rhymes, the Flipmode Squad, and Carey lounging around an expensive mansion. During Carey's appearance, her jewelry brand "Automatic Princess" was advertised. Meanwhile, Busta watches over the female interest of the video played by video vixen La'Shontae "Tae" Heckard, as she reads a Frank Miller-stylized graphic novel. Her husband in the video is played by martial artist and actor Michael Jai White. A brief animated sequence drawn from the graphic novel is featured. The video premiered on BET Access Granted on April 17, 2003.

The plotline for the song's music video was continued in the video for the 2021 single "Where I Belong", in which Rhymes collaborated again with Carey.

== Formats and track listings ==
Canadian CD single

1. "I Know What You Want" (radio edit)
2. "I Know What You Want" (instrumental radio edit)

European CD single

1. "I Know What You Want" (album version)
2. "Break Ya Neck"

Australian/European CD maxi-single

1. "I Know What You Want" (album version)
2. "Break Ya Neck"
3. "I Know What You Want" (instrumental)
4. "I Know What You Want" (video)

UK CD maxi-single

1. "I Know What You Want"
2. "Call the Ambulance" (remix featuring M.O.P. and Rah Digga)
3. "Call the Ambulance" (featuring Rampage)
4. "I Know What You Want" (video)

== Charts ==
=== Weekly charts ===
Chart (2003)	Peak position
Australia (ARIA)	3
Australia Urban (ARIA)	1
Austria (Ö3 Austria Top 40)	40
Belgium (Ultratop 50 Flanders)	8
Belgium (Ultratop 50 Wallonia)	11
Canada (Nielsen SoundScan)	5
Croatia International Airplay (Top lista) (Note: Only a partial archive of the Croatian charts is available so it is possible that the single had a higher peak.)	3
Denmark (Tracklisten)	7
Europe (Eurochart Hot 100 Singles)	1
France (SNEP)	25
Germany (Official German Charts)	9
Hungary (Rádiós Top 40)	1
Hungary (Single Top 40)	2
Ireland (IRMA)	4
Italy (FIMI)	4
Netherlands (Dutch Top 40)	6
Netherlands (Single Top 100)	4
New Zealand (Recorded Music NZ)	7
Norway (VG-lista)	6
Poland (National Airplay Chart)	1
Romania (Romanian Top 100)	1
Scottish Singles Sales (Official Charts)	9
Sweden (Sverigetopplistan)	11
Switzerland (Schweizer Hitparade)	5
UK Singles (Official Charts)	3
UK Hip Hop/R&B (Official Charts)	2
UK Urban Club (Music Week)	1
UK Airplay (Music Control)	5
US Billboard Hot 100	3
US CHR/Pop (Radio & Records)	4
US CHR/Rhythmic (Radio & Records)	3
US Hot R&B/Hip-Hop Songs (Billboard)	2
US Pop Airplay (Billboard)	4
US Hot Rap Songs (Billboard)	3
US Rhythmic Airplay (Billboard)	3
US Top 40 Tracks (Billboard)	6
US Urban (Radio & Records)	2

2025 weekly chart performance for "I Know What You Want"
Chart (2025)	Peak position
Moldova Airplay (TopHit)	71

=== Year-end charts ===
Chart (2003)	Position
Australia (ARIA)	31
Belgium (Ultratop 50 Flanders)	51
Belgium (Ultratop 50 Wallonia)	59
Germany (Media Control GfK)	89
Ireland (IRMA)	32
Italy (FIMI)	20
Netherlands (Dutch Top 40)	48
Netherlands (Single Top 100)	54
New Zealand (RIANZ)	31
Sweden (Hitlistan)	71
Switzerland (Schweizer Hitparade)	25
UK Singles (OCC)	38
UK Urban (Music Week); Thin Line	2
US Billboard Hot 100	17
US Hot R&B/Hip-Hop Singles & Tracks (Billboard)	13
US Hot Rap Tracks (Billboard)	8
US Mainstream Top 40 (Billboard)	45
US Rhythmic Top 40 (Billboard)	16
US Top 40 Tracks (Billboard)	38
US CHR/Pop (Radio & Records)	40
US CHR/Rhythmic (Radio & Records)	9
US Urban (Radio & Records)	7

Chart (2004)	Position
Brazil (Crowley)	89

== Certifications ==
Region	Certification	Certified units/sales
Australia (ARIA)	Platinum	70,000^{‡}
Germany (BVMI)	Gold	300,000^{‡}
Italy (FIMI)	Gold	50,000^{‡}
New Zealand (RMNZ)	2× Platinum	60,000^{‡}
United Kingdom (BPI)	Platinum	600,000^{‡}
United States (RIAA)	Platinum	1,000,000^{‡}
^{‡} Sales+streaming figures based on certification alone.

== Release history ==
Release dates and formats
Region	Date	Format	Label(s)	Ref.
United States	February 24, 2003	Rhythmic contemporary radio	MonarC; J	
United States	February 24, 2003	Urban contemporary radio	J	
United States	March 31, 2003	Contemporary hit radio	J	
Belgium	May 14, 2003	CD; maxi CD	J	
United Kingdom	May 26, 2003	12-inch vinyl; cassette; CD	Arista	
Australia	June 9, 2003	CD	BMG	
Europe	May 5, 2003	CD	Atlantic Records	

== See also ==
- List of Romanian Top 100 number ones of the 2000s
