= Charmbracelet World Tour =

2003–04 concert tour by Mariah Carey

- Tour by Mariah Carey
- Location: Asia; Europe; North America
- Associated album: Charmbracelet
- Start date: June 20, 2003
- End date: February 26, 2004
- Legs: 7
- No. of shows: 69
- Box office: $6.0 million (25 shows)

Mariah Carey concert chronology
- Rainbow World Tour (2000); Charmbracelet World Tour (2003–04); The Adventures of Mimi (2006)

The Charmbracelet World Tour was the fifth worldwide concert tour in 2003–2004 by American singer-songwriter Mariah Carey in support of her ninth studio album Charmbracelet (2002). The tour started on June 21, 2003 in Seoul, South Korea, and visited several countries in Asia, Europe, and North America before ending on February 26, 2004 in Dubai. At the end of 2003, the tour placed 83rd on Pollstar's "Top 100 Tours", grossing more than $6.0 million with 25 shows from her first North American leg.

== Background ==
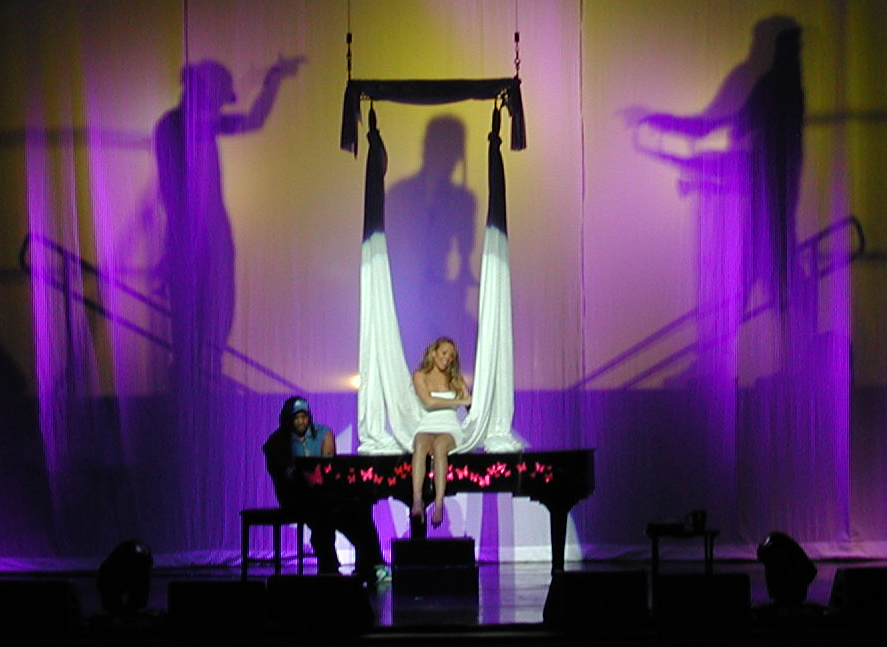
Carey performing "Subtle Invitation" on the tour

In April 2003, Carey announced a world tour in support of her recent studio album Charmbracelet. The tour followed her Rainbow World Tour in 2000 and was her most extensive lasting for sixty-nine shows over eight months. The tour reached many places in East Asia, Southeast Asia, and the Middle East.

Since her debut on the music scene in 1990, Carey has toured very infrequently compared to many other established acts. As such, the length of this tour had actually been extended due to Carey attempting to promote the Charmbracelet album which was underperforming. After the initial stretch of the tour, Carey decided to add additional dates. For the new dates, she performed a more condensed show, removing several songs from the set list and performing a few new songs in their place with Christmas elements during the seasonal period.

In the United States, venues were switched from large arenas to smaller, more intimate theatre shows due to slow sales in some cities. According to Carey, however, the change was made in order to give fans a more intimate show. She said, "It's much more intimate so you'll feel like you had an experience. You experience a night with me." However, while smaller venues were booked for the US leg of the tour, Carey performed at some arenas in Asia and Europe, and performed for a crowd of over 35,000 in Manila, 50,000 in Malaysia, and to over 70,000 people in China. In the UK, it was Carey's first tour to feature shows outside London; she performed in Glasgow, Birmingham and Manchester.

== Critical response ==
Professional ratings
Review scores
Source	Rating
The Guardian	4/5 stars
Las Vegas Review-Journal	B
Los Angeles Daily News	4/5 stars
Rolling Stone	4/5 stars
The Times	3/5 stars

The tour garnered praise from music critics and audiences, many of whom complimented the quality of Carey's live vocals and the production of the shows. Fans were given the opportunity to request songs from Carey's catalog, which added to its positive reception. At her concert in Manila, Rito P. Asilo from Philippine Daily Inquirer wrote, "I didn't expect her voice to be that crystal clear!" He added, "After 15 songs, we couldn't seem to get enough of Mariah—and we became a believer!".

Carey's sexual image also generated some controversy during the tour. In various countries, she was often criticized for her choice of dress, and a Pan-Islamic youth leader attempted to have her banned from performing in Malaysia.

== Set list ==
1. "Looking In" (Instrumental introduction) contains elements of "Butterfly")
2. "Heartbreaker" (includes elements of the "Desert Storm Remix")
3. "Dreamlover" (includes elements of "Juicy" by The Notorious B.I.G.)
4. "Through the Rain"
5. "My All" (includes elements of "Classic Club Mix")
6. "Marionette Show" (interlude)
7. "Clown"
8. "Can't Take That Away (Mariah's Theme)"
9. "Honey" (video interlude)
10. "Honey" (includes elements of "Bad Boy Remix")
11. "I Know What You Want"
12. "Subtle Invitation"
13. "My Saving Grace"
14. "I'll Be There" (with Trey Lorenz)
15. "Friend of Mine" (Trey Lorenz solo)
16. "Bringin' On the Heartbreak"
17. "Fantasy" (Bad Boy Remix)
18. "Always Be My Baby"
19. "Make It Happen"

Encore

20. "Vision of Love"
21. "Hero"
22. "Butterfly Reprise" (Outro)
Notes
- "You Got Me" was performed during the opening night in Seoul.
- "Can't Take That Away (Mariah's Theme)" was temporarily performed from July 26 to November 16, and was ultimately added to the set list on December 10.
- "Always Be My Baby" and "Bringin' On the Heartbreak" were not performed on select dates.
- "All I Want for Christmas Is You" was performed during shows in Japan and the second American leg.
- "Can't Take That Away (Mariah's Theme)" was replaced by "One Sweet Day" in St. Louis, Denver and Mashantucket.
- "Without You" was temporarily performed from September 17 to November 16.
- From December 9 to 22, "Hark! The Herald Angels Sing", "Gloria (In Excelsis Deo)", "Silent Night" and "Joy to the World" were performed.
- During the third show in Los Angeles, "What Would You Do" replaced "I Know What You Want".
- "I'll Be There" was not performed in Beirut.
- "Clown" and "Subtle Invitation" were cut from the set list on December 9, 2003.
- "Vision of Love" was not performed in Busan, Jakarta and Dubai.

== Shows ==
List of Asian concerts
Date (2003)	City	Country	Venue	Attendance (Tickets sold / available)	Revenue
June 21	Seoul	South Korea	Jamsil Arena	—N/a	—N/a
June 24	Osaka	Japan	Osaka-Jo Hall	—N/a	—N/a
June 26	Osaka	Japan	Osaka-Jo Hall	—N/a	—N/a
June 29	Fukuoka	Japan	Marine Messe Fukuoka	—N/a	—N/a
July 1	Fukuoka	Japan	Marine Messe Fukuoka	—N/a	—N/a
July 3	Hiroshima	Japan	Hiroshima Sun Plaza	—N/a	—N/a
July 6	Tokyo	Japan	Budokan Arena	—N/a	—N/a
July 8	Tokyo	Japan	Budokan Arena	—N/a	—N/a
July 10	Tokyo	Japan	Budokan Arena	—N/a	—N/a
July 13	Nagoya	Japan	Rainbow Hall	—N/a	—N/a
July 15	Nagoya	Japan	Rainbow Hall	—N/a	—N/a

List of North American concerts
Date (2003)	City	Country	Venue	Attendance (Tickets sold / available)	Revenue
July 26	Las Vegas	United States	Colosseum at Caesars Palace	—N/a	—N/a
July 29	Chicago	United States	United Center	—N/a	—N/a
August 1	St. Louis	United States	Fox Theatre	—N/a	—N/a
August 3	Cleveland	United States	The Scene Center	—N/a	—N/a
August 5	Columbia	United States	Merriweather Post Pavilion	—N/a	—N/a
August 7	Toronto	Canada	Sears Theater	—N/a	—N/a
August 10	Morrison	United States	Red Rocks Amphitheatre	—N/a	—N/a
August 13	Concord	United States	Chronicle Pavilion	—N/a	—N/a
August 15	San Diego	United States	SDSU Open Air Theatre	—N/a	—N/a
August 18	Los Angeles	United States	Universal Amphitheatre	—N/a	—N/a
August 21	Los Angeles	United States	Universal Amphitheatre	—N/a	—N/a
August 23	Phoenix	United States	Dodge Theatre	—N/a	—N/a
August 26	Grand Prairie	United States	NextStage Theatre	—N/a	—N/a
August 28	The Woodlands	United States	The Woodlands Pavilion	—N/a	—N/a
August 30	Orlando	United States	Bob Carr Performing Arts Center	—N/a	—N/a
September 1	Fort Lauderdale	United States	Au-Rene Theater	—N/a	—N/a
September 3	Tampa	United States	Carol Morsani Hall	—N/a	—N/a
September 6	Mashantucket	United States	Foxwoods Resort Casino	—N/a	—N/a
September 8	Boston	United States	Wang Theatre	—N/a	—N/a
September 10	Upper Darby Township	United States	Tower Theater	—N/a	—N/a
September 12	Wallingford	United States	Oakdale Theatre	—N/a	—N/a
September 14	Cincinnati	United States	U.S. Bank Arena	—N/a	—N/a
September 18	New York City	United States	Radio City Music Hall	5,922 / 5,922	$426,945
September 20	Atlantic City	United States	Mark Etess Arena	—N/a	—N/a
September 23	Manchester	United States	Verizon Wireless Arena	4,531 / 6,715	$305,775

List of European concerts
Date (2003)	City	Country	Venue	Attendance (Tickets sold / available)	Revenue
September 27	Moscow	Russia	State Kremlin Palace	—N/a	—N/a
September 29	Moscow	Russia	State Kremlin Palace	—N/a	—N/a
October 2	Saint Petersburg	Russia	Ice Palace	—N/a	—N/a
October 5	Stockholm	Sweden	Globen Arena	—N/a	—N/a
October 8	Rotterdam	Netherlands	Sportpaleis van Ahoy	—N/a	—N/a
October 10	Hamburg	Germany	Color Line Arena	—N/a	—N/a
October 13	Berlin	Germany	Max-Schmeling-Halle	—N/a	—N/a
October 16	Munich	Germany	Olympiahalle	—N/a	—N/a
October 19	Vienna	Austria	Wiener Stadthalle	—N/a	—N/a
October 22	Zürich	Switzerland	Hallenstadion	—N/a	—N/a
October 25	Glasgow	Scotland	Scottish Exhibition Hall 4	—N/a	—N/a
October 28	Birmingham	England	National Exhibition Centre	—N/a	—N/a
October 30	London	England	Wembley Arena	—N/a	—N/a
November 1	Manchester	England	Manchester Evening News Arena	—N/a	—N/a
November 4	Paris	France	Palais Omnisports de Paris-Bercy	—N/a	—N/a
November 7	Milan	Italy	Fila Forum	—N/a	—N/a

List of Asian concerts
Date (2003)	City	Country	Venue	Attendance (Tickets sold / available)	Revenue
November 12	Shanghai	China	Hong Kou Stadium	—N/a	—N/a
November 14	Shanghai	China	Hong Kou Stadium	—N/a	—N/a
November 16	Taguig	Philippines	Bonifacio Global City Open Field	—N/a	—N/a

List of North American concerts
Date (2003)	City	Country	Venue	Attendance (Tickets sold / available)	Revenue
December 9	Portland	United States	Arlene Schnitzer Concert Hall	—N/a	—N/a
December 10	Seattle	United States	McCaw Hall	—N/a	—N/a
December 12	San Jose	United States	HP Pavilion	5,508 / 5,508	$303,943
December 15	Santa Barbara	United States	Arlington Theatre	—N/a	—N/a
December 17	Los Angeles	United States	Universal Amphitheater	5,614 / 5,769	$302,675
December 19	Tucson	United States	Tucson Arena	—N/a	—N/a
December 20	Las Vegas	United States	Theatre for the Performing Arts	—N/a	—N/a
December 22	Costa Mesa	United States	Orange County Performing Arts Center	—N/a	—N/a

List of Asian concerts
Date (2004)	City	Country	Venue	Attendance (Tickets sold / available)	Revenue
February 13	Busan	South Korea	Busan Convention Center	—N/a	—N/a
February 15	Jakarta	Indonesia	Jakarta Convention Center	—N/a	—N/a
February 17	Bangkok	Thailand	Impact Arena	—N/a	—N/a
February 20	Kuala Lumpur	Malaysia	Stadium Merdeka	—N/a	—N/a
February 24	Beirut	Lebanon	B.I.E.L.	—N/a	—N/a
February 26	Dubai	United Arab Emirates	Dubai Media City	—N/a	—N/a
Total				21,575 / 23,914 (98%)	$1,339,338

== Personnel ==
- Randy Jackson – musical director
- Lionel Cole - piano, keyboards
- Eric Daniels – keyboards
- Sam Sims - bass
- Vernon Black – guitar
- Gregory "Gigi" Gonoway – drums
- Trey Lorenz – background vocals
- Mary Ann Tatum – background vocals
- Sherry Tatum - background vocals
- Takeytha Johnson – background vocals
