= Through the Rain =

2002 single by Mariah Carey

- One of the alternative commercial artworks.

Single by Mariah Carey

from the album Charmbracelet
- B-side: "Bringin' On the Heartbreak" (live)
- Released: September 30, 2002
- Recorded: May 2002
- Studio: Capri Digital (Capri, Italy); Flyte Tyme (Edina, Minnesota)
- Genre: Pop; soul; R&B
- Length: 4:49 (album version); 4:19 (radio edit)
- Label: Island Def Jam; MonarC
- Composers: Mariah Carey; Lionel Cole
- Lyricist: Mariah Carey
- Producers: Mariah Carey; Jimmy Jam and Terry Lewis

Mariah Carey singles chronology
"Never Too Far/Hero Medley" (2001)	"Through the Rain" (2002)	"Boy (I Need You)" (2002)

Music video
- "Through the Rain" on YouTube

"Through the Rain" is a song by American singer Mariah Carey, taken from her ninth studio album, Charmbracelet (2002). It was written by Carey and Lionel Cole, and produced by the former and Jimmy Jam and Terry Lewis. The song was released as the album's lead single on September 30, 2002 by Island Def Jam and also the first single to be released by Carey's own record label, MonarC Entertainment. A shorter version was used as the ending credits theme for a 2002 Japanese drama known as You're Under Arrest. Classified by Carey as a ballad, it is influenced by R&B and soul music genres, and features a simple and under-stated piano melody, backed by soft electronic synthesizers. "Through the Rain" was meant to be an insight into Carey personal struggles throughout 2001, and lyrically talks about encouraging others.

The song has been well-received, with many complimenting its inspirational lyrical content, and described it as an open window into Carey's personal life for listeners. Commercially, it was Carey's lowest-charting lead single on the US Billboard Hot 100 at the time, and it was her first lead single to that point not to reach the top ten in the United States. Though stalling at number 81, it became successful on the Billboard dance charts, hitting number one for a week in the United States. The song achieved higher placements in international markets, reaching the top spot in Spain and peaking within the top ten in Canada, the Netherlands, Italy, Sweden, Switzerland and the United Kingdom.

Carey performed "Through the Rain" live on several television and award show appearances around the world. She debuted the song at the 2002 NRJ Awards, and features it on a one-hour special titled Mariah Carey: Shining Through the Rain, which aired three days later on MTV. In the United States, Carey performed the song on Today, The Oprah Winfrey Show, and American Music Awards of 2003. Throughout Europe, Carey performed the song on The Graham Norton Show and on talent competition, Fame Academy. Additionally, "Through the Rain" was included on the set-list of Carey's Charmbracelet World Tour: An Intimate Evening with Mariah Carey, which spanned throughout 2003–04.

The music video, directed by Dave Meyers, was set in the late 1960s. It features a past and present story-line based on Carey's childhood, and stars J. D. Williams and Jamie-Lynn Sigler as the singer's parents. The video begins with past scenes of Carey's mother being disowned by her family after becoming romantically involved with a black man, and finds the singer in the present walking through a heavy rainstorm in New York.

== Background ==
In 2000, Carey parted from Columbia Records and signed a record-breaking $100 million five-album recording contract with Virgin Records America (EMI Records). She often stated that Columbia had regarded her as a commodity, with her separation from Tommy Mottola exacerbating her relations with label executives. However, in July 2001, Carey had suffered a physical and emotional breakdown. Due to this situation, Virgin and 20th Century Fox delayed the release of Carey's film Glitter, as well as its soundtrack of the same name. Both the releases received negative feedback and were commercially unsuccessful. This also resulted in her deal with Virgin being bought out for $50 million. Soon after, Carey flew to Capri, Italy for a period of five months, in which she began writing material for her new album, stemming from all the personal experiences she had endured throughout the past year. Carey later said that her time at Virgin was "a complete and total stress-fest [...] I made a total snap decision which was based on money and I never make decisions based on money. I learned a big lesson from that." Later that year, she signed a contract with Island Records, valued at more than $24 million, and launched the record label MonarC. To add further to Carey's emotional burdens, her father, with whom she had little contact since childhood, died of cancer that year.

== Release ==
Throughout the first years of her career, Carey's musical styles mainly involved pop influenced R&B. Additionally, her image was of a reserved and modestly dressed female, or as Carey's later described it "the 90s version of Mary Poppins". As the 1990s wore on, Carey began featuring rappers on remixes, and began infusing hip-hop into her musical palette. As her music changed, so too did her image, which became more sexual, and aimed at younger audiences than the more adult contemporary appeal of her earlier works. According to Michael Paoletta from Billboard, "Through the Rain" was used not only as a vehicle for listeners to become more in-tune with Carey's personal struggles, but also as a means to "re-capture" her audience throughout the earlier stages of her career. A adult contemporary and pop ballad, he felt the song would find "much embrace" from her older fans, while her audience that grew accustomed to her hip-hop flavored music would feel "lost and abandoned". In an interview with MTV News, the song's co-producer Jimmy Jam described why Carey chose to release it as the lead single: "I think 'Through the Rain' is a great way to start the record, because it is emotional and it kind of speaks directly to the questions people might have about the last year of her life. It's a good idea to get that out of the way and move on to happy, less emotional songs."

=== Remix ===
The song's official remix features guest vocals from Kelly Price and Joe. The remix incorporates a more up-tempo background, and differs melodically from the original. While the album's co-producer, Jimmy Jam, described it as a "star search," Sarah Rodman from the Boston Herald felt that even though the remix was more up-beat than the original, it "failed to quicken the pulse."

== Composition ==
"Through the Rain"
A sample of "Through the Rain", featuring the song's simple and under-stated piano melody. Additionally, the song's lyrics are aimed to inspire listeners to find their "inner strength", and be able to walk alone through the turbulent times going on in their life.

"Through the Rain" is a mid-tempo ballad, which is influenced by pop, soul and R&B music genres. The song is built around a piano melody, and features a beat that is accentuated by synthesizers. Aside from its pop-driven melody and structure, Jeff Vrabel of the Chicago Sun-Times noted an hint of gospel towards the song's crescendo, describing it as "lite-gospel". Vocally, "Through the Rain" finds Carey singing in a "restrained" style for the duration of most of the song, as the first verse and chorus are sung in breathy vocals. After the second chorus, the bridge is linked to the song's climax through a long belted note. The Daily Union's David Germain felt the song's composition, as well as Carey's vocal performance were "simple and reserved", with Carey in "complete control" of her voice. "Through the Rain" was written by Carey and Lionel Cole and produced by the former and Jimmy Jam and Terry Lewis. According to the sheet music published at Musicnotes.com by Universal Music Publishing Ltd., "Through the Rain" is set in common time with a tempo of 64 beats per minute. It is composed in the key of A-flat major but with the transposing key to B-major, with Carey's vocal range spanning from the low-note of E♭_{3} to the high-note of F♯_{5}.

Lyrically, the song features an inspirational message of inner strength, and finds Carey reaching out to listeners. The song uses a rainstorm as a metaphor for troubles in life, while encouraging others to "make it through the rain" through perseverance. The first chorus begins: "When you get caught in the rain / With no where to run / When your distraught and in pain without anyone / When you keep crying out to be saved", illustrating a moment in an individual's life where they are surrounded by conflict. The chorus then serves as a guide to those still suffering, "I can make it through the rain, I can stand up once again on my own / And I know that I'm strong enough to mend / And every time I feel afraid I hold tighter to my faith / And I live one more day and I make it through the rain". Similarly, the second verse once again revisits difficult times when "shadows grow close", before continuing into the second chorus and climax. While the song in meant for listeners to gain confidence and strength, it also allows them into Carey's personal struggles she endured throughout 2001. Lola Ogunnaike of The New York Times described the song as a "triumph over adversity", while a writer from the Sydney Morning Herald wrote "it's an insight into her recent troubles." In an interview with MTV News, Carey described the song's lyrical content in depth:

I've always tried to insert positivity into my songs wherever I can, to inspire other people who go through stuff. I mean the stuff they talked about in tabloids and the things that were so overly exaggerated, that's one aspect. I also went through a lot of personal stuff, a lot of family stuff this year. Losing a parent is an intense thing for anybody. It's brought me to another place. People are going to read into it as, 'This is Mariah and her struggle'. But the way I try to word it is, 'It's OK once you say I can make it through the rain.' Not just me going, 'I can make it through the rain,' it's me telling people that if you believe you can get through whatever you're going through, you can get to the other side.

== Critical reception ==
"Through the Rain" received positive reviews from music critics; many complimented Carey's restrained vocal performance, as well as the song's simple instrumental accompaniment, while others criticized it for being overly-dramatic. Jon Pareles of The New York Times described it as "inspirational", and felt that due to its vagueness, the song is would be applicable to all listeners, not just Carey. The Daily Union's David Germain commented how the song's simple musical arrangement and Carey's "restrained" vocal delivery aided it in becoming "modest and reserved". Writing for Billboard, Michael Paoletta chose "Through the Rain" as a top pick from the album, as did Allmusic's Stephen Thomas Erlewine. He described it as a song that was designed as "'Vision of Love' meets 'Hero'", and wrote, "Mariah is back in the adult contemporary camp, no longer trying to prove that she's real." Cara DiPasquale from the Chicago Tribune called it a "powerhouse ballad", while Entertainment Weekly's Tom Sinclair wrote "embellished with her trademark vocal pyrotechnics, it is one of those highly personal songs about finding your way out of an emotional wilderness, but it sinks in its own sodden sentimentality". Similarly, a writer from Newsday also described "Through the Rain" as a "powerhouse ballad", and felt it was reminiscent of Carey's previous single "One Sweet Day" (1995). Writing for the Los Angeles Times, Randy Lewis noted how the song was able to effectively take listeners right into Carey's personal struggles from the previous year. Tina Brown from Newsweek felt that while Carey's personal troubles may not have been fully solved, the song made her appear "strong and triumphant". Bob Waliszewski of Plugged In noted that "Through the Rain" "encourages listeners to weather life's storms with the help of faith, prayer and perseverance".

=== Accolades ===
Publication	Accolade	Rank	Ref.
Rolling Stone (Readers' Picks)	The 10 Best Singles of 2002	7	

== Commercial performance ==
After premiering in the United States, "Through the Rain" peaked at number 81 on the Billboard Hot 100. In addition, it reached number one on the Billboard Dance Club Play chart. While radio appeal was primarily weak throughout the United States, the song managed to sustain strong airplay throughout Asia. In Canada, "Through the Rain" peaked at number five on the singles chart, and was certified Gold by the Canadian Recording Industry Association (CRIA), denoting shipments of over 5,000 units. Throughout Australasia and Europe, the song managed to peak within the top five in several countries. In Australia, "Through the Rain" debuted at its peak position of number fifteen on the singles chart, during the week of November 14, 2002. The following week, the song began its decline, and had a total chart trajectory of ten weeks. On November 11, 2002, "Through the Rain" debuted at number forty-eight on the Ö3 Austria Top 40 chart. The song peaked at number forty-five the next week, and fell out of the chart in its eleventh week, while it was at sixty-eight.

The song achieved relatively weak charting in both the Flemish and Wallonian territories in Belgium, peaking at numbers forty-four and twenty-nine, respectively. Making its debut at its peak position of number twenty-two, "Through the Rain" charted for a total of nineteen weeks in France, before falling out on March 22, 2003. On the Dutch Top 40 chart, the song made its debut at number thirty-two. Four weeks later, the song peaked at number nine, before dropping outside the top 40 five weeks later, ending its eleven-week run. "Through the Rain" entered the New Zealand Singles Chart at number thirty-seven, during the week dated December 1, 2002. In total, the song spent three weeks at its peak position of number thirty-seven, and a total of seven weeks on the chart. In both Denmark and Norway, the song saw moderate success, peaking at numbers thirteen and fifteen, and lasting on the chart for one and three weeks, respectively. On November 28, 2002, "Through the Rain" debuted at number twelve on the Swedish Singles Chart, and reached a peak of number seven. Though released at the end of the year, it managed to finish at number 83 on the year-end chart. Similarly in Switzerland, the song peaked at number seven, and finished at number 98 on the end of year chart. On the UK Singles Chart, "Through the Rain" debuted at its peak of number eight. The following week, the song dropped to number twenty-one on the chart, before dropping outside the top-forty two weeks later.

In Spain, "Through the Rain" topped the charts in its second week, becoming Carey's first and only number one in the country. Despite the achievement, the song spent three weeks on the charts.

== Music video ==
=== Background ===
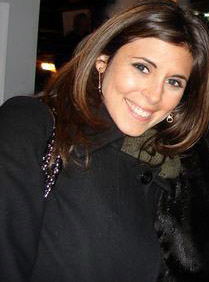
Jamie-Lynn Sigler (pictured) plays the role of Carey's mother in the video.

Directed by Dave Meyers and filmed on location in New York City on September 30 and October 1, 2002, the music video is loosely based on the singer's parents, Alfred and Patricia Carey, during the times that she was conceived. Jamie-Lynn Sigler and J. D. Williams play the respective main characters, a teenager named Kirsten and her boyfriend, and the video incorporates themes from Charmbracelet as well as from Carey's life. In an interview with MTV News, Carey said that originally, the plot for the video wasn't going to have anything to do with her parents' past experiences with racism, but was changed a few days before shooting began. During the interview, she described how to plot came into reality:

Originally it wasn't going to have anything to do with that, but people were looking through my photo albums this year. My father and I had made some photo albums together of his relatives and different people in the family. A couple people saw [the albums] and they were like, 'This is amazing that you have this.' I guess everybody was like, 'How would you feel about this type of concept [for a video]?' So I guess I thought if someone's going to do it might as well be me. The story line [of the video] is about an interracial couple. It's sort of Romeo and Juliet but it's set in the '60s and they're kind of torn apart. It's about their struggle and I'm sort of the narrator. I don't want to give too much away about it, but it's nice. Something I could relate to, being the product of an interracial union, though [my parents] did not wind up happily ever after standing in church together.

Sigler, who was offered the role only days before filming commenced, said that she had always been a fan of Carey, and accepted the offer immediately. She described that the shoot was set in the 1960s, and that she played the singer's mother during and after her pregnancy. Sigler described the plot: "With my character, she's basically going against her parents' wishes to be with this gentleman. She's pregnant with a baby, which is Mariah, and they run away together. So it's kind of an epic love story, it's nice." Carey revealed that the video would incorporate a rainstorm scene in New York City. Carey jokingly explained how she originally did not intend to get wet, but felt it added a lot to the video.

=== Synopsis ===
The video begins with a view of Carey's personal family album. As the pages open, the camera zooms to one particular photograph, of her young mother Kirsten facing a wall, with her back turned. As the picture comes into full view, it turns into actual footage. Kirsten turns around in anguish, as her own mother begins shouting at her and calling her a disgrace to the family because she has discovered Kirsten's pregnancy with the child of a black man, whom she wants to move out with. As she goes to leave the home, her mother grabs her arm and rips a charm bracelet from her wrist. As Kirsten picks it up off the floor, she tells her mother she hates her and leaves in a taxi. From the clothing and scenery, it is notable that the scenes depicted are happening in the late 1960s, prior to Carey's birth. As the song starts playing, the video focuses on Carey, walking down the street in New York City. As she continues singing and walking down the street, the camera aims to the sky, which is darkened with cloud while light starts to peer through.

While rain starts to fall, and people start to clear the streets, Carey remains walking on the pathway. Kirsten now reaches her destination, and is welcomed into the home of her lover. They soon board a bus, and travel to a new home where they will live together. As they are about to enter the bus, Kirsten's mother is seen screaming in tears for her daughter to return to her. Kirsten hesitates, and then continues with her lover onto the transport. The scene once again focuses on Carey, who is standing in the midst of a torrential downpour, singing to the heavens. As she reaches the song's climax, Carey, now dry and dressed in a long black gown, is shown singing at the altar of a church. As she sings at the church, scenes of Kirsten lighting a candle, and her lover laying together with her on a bed are shown, before focusing back on Carey. She stares at an elderly couple in the first row at the church, an inter-racial couple now revealed to be her parents, and smiles while wearing her mother's charm bracelet. The elderly woman begins crying, as her husband holds her hand as they intently stare at Carey. Their faces rejuvenate to show them as a young couple, as their photo is taken and placed into the family album from the beginning of the video.

== Live performances ==
Following the release of "Through the Rain", Carey embarked on several stateside, European and Asian promotional tours in support of Charmbracelet, as well as its accompanying singles. Promotion for the former song began at the 2002 NRJ Awards, where Carey appeared on stage sporting a long wavy style and wearing a long black skirt and denim blazer. Three days prior to the album's stateside release, a one-hour special titled Mariah Carey: Shining Through the Rain aired on MTV, in which Carey was interviewed and sang several songs from Charmbracelet and of her catalog. During the interview, Carey addressed rumors of her breakdown and its cause, as well as of the album and its inspiration, followed by a question and answer with fans. During the album's month of release, Carey appeared on several television talk shows, launching her promotional tour on Today, where she performed a four-song set-list at Mall of America for a crowd of over 10,000. On December 3, 2002, Carey appeared on The Oprah Winfrey Show, where she performed "Through the Rain" and "My Saving Grace", and covered a highly publicized interview regarding Carey's hospitalization. On December 4, Carey traveled to Brazil for South American promotion of Charmbracelet, appearing on the popular Brazilian program, Fantástico. She sang "My All", and reprised performances of "Through the Rain" and "I Only Wanted" wearing a long pink gown. She also made a surprise appearance on Show da Virada, singing "Through the Rain" and "My All", while wearing a short silver dress. On December 7, 2002, Carey performed "Through the Rain" in front of a crowd of 50,000 people, at the closing concert of the Mexican Teletón, which took place in the country's Azteca Stadium.

One month later, Carey was featured as one of the headlining performers at the 30th annual American Music Awards, held on January 13, 2003. Introduced by Sharon Osbourne, Carey performed "Through the Rain" alongside a complete live gospel choir, and wore a long black evening gown. During the recital, images of newspaper headlines describing Carey's breakdown were projected on a large curtain behind her, with one reading "When you fall down, you get back up." Following the song's completion, Carey received a standing ovation. Towards the end of March, Charmbracelet saw release throughout Europe, prompting Carey to appear on several programs in promotion of the album. She first performed the album's leading two singles on the British music chart show, Top of the Pops, followed by a similar set on The Graham Norton Show and Fame Academy. On the latter program, Carey was joined on stage by the show's finalists, as they all sang the climax on "Through the Rain" alongside her. "Through the Rain" was only performed on Carey's Charmbracelet World Tour: An Intimate Evening with Mariah Carey, which spanned throughout 2003–04. During the performances, Carey wore a sparkling bra and mini-skirt. During most of the song, Carey performed it while sitting on a large sofa, before standing for the climax. At her concert in Manila, Rito P. Asilo from Philippine Daily Inquirer praised Carey's live rendition of the song, describing it as one of the show's high-lights.

== Formats and track listings ==
US double 12-inch vinyl

A. "Through the Rain" (Full Intention Club Mix) – 9:15
B. "Through the Rain" (Maurice Joshua Club Mix) – 8:11
C. "Through the Rain" (Hex Hector Club Mix) – 12:03
D1. "Through the Rain" (Full Intention Dub Mix) – 7:14
D2. "Through the Rain" (Maurice Joshua Dub Mix) – 6:02

International CD single

1. "Through the Rain" (LP Version) – 4:49
2. "Through the Rain" (Remix feat. Kelly Price & Joe) – 3:33

European cassette single

A1. "Through the Rain" (Radio Edit) – 4:16
A2. "Through the Rain" (Remix feat. Kelly Price & Joe) – 3:33
A3. "Through the Rain" (Hex Hector Radio Edit) – 4:05
B1. "Through the Rain" (Radio Edit) – 4:16
B2. "Through the Rain" (Remix feat. Kelly Price & Joe) – 3:33
B3. "Through the Rain" (Hex Hector Radio Edit) – 4:05

International maxi-CD single 1

1. "Through the Rain" (LP Version) – 4:49
2. "Through the Rain" (Remix feat. Kelly Price & Joe) – 3:33
3. "Through the Rain" (Full Intention Radio Edit) – 3:58
4. "Through the Rain" (Boris & Michi's Radio Mix) – 4:01

International maxi-CD single 2

1. "Through the Rain" (Radio Edit) – 4:18
2. "Through the Rain" (Hex Hector/Mac Quayle Radio Edit) – 4:05
3. "Through the Rain" (Maurice Joshua Radio Edit) – 4:17
4. "Through the Rain" (Full Intention Club Mix) – 9:17

UK enhanced CD single

1. "Through the Rain" (Radio Edit) – 4:16
2. "Through the Rain" (Remix feat. Kelly Price & Joe) – 3:33
3. "Through the Rain" (Maurice Joshua Radio Mix) – 4:17
4. "Through the Rain" (Video)

UK CD single

1. "Through the Rain" (Album Version) – 4:49
2. "Through the Rain" (Full Intention Radio Mix) – 3:58
3. "Through the Rain" (Boris & Michi's Radio Mix) – 4:01
4. "Through the Rain" (Hex Hector Radio Mix) – 4:05

US CD single

1. "Through the Rain" (Album Version) – 4:49
2. "Through the Rain" (Hex Hector/Mac Quayle Radio Edit) – 4:11
3. "Bringin' On the Heartbreak" (Live Version) – 4:50

Through the Rain EP

1. "Through the Rain" (Radio Edit) – 4:17
2. "Through the Rain" (Remix feat. Kelly Price & Joe) – 3:33
3. "Through the Rain" (Hex Hector/Mac Quayle Radio Edit) – 4:10
4. "Through the Rain" (Hex Hector/Mac Quayle Club Mix) – 12:03
5. "Through the Rain" (Boris & Michi's Club Mix) – 7:08
6. "Through the Rain" (Boris & Michi's Radio Edit) – 4:01
7. "Through the Rain" (Bors & Michi's Through the Dub Mix) – 5:53
8. "Through the Rain" (Full Intention Club Mix) – 9:15
9. "Through the Rain" (Full Intention Radio Edit) – 3:58
10. "Through the Rain" (Full Intention Dub Mix) – 7:14
11. "Through the Rain" (Maurice Joshua Nu Soul Club Mix) – 8:11
12. "Through the Rain" (Maurice Joshua Radio Mix) – 4:15
13. "Through the Rain" (Maurice Joshua Dub Mix) – 6:02

== Credits and personnel ==
Credits for "Through the Rain" are adapted from the Charmbracelet liner notes.

- Mariah Carey – songwriting, producer, vocals
- Lionel Cole – songwriting
- James Wright – keyboard, co-producer
- James Harris III – producer
- Terry Lewis – producer
- Steve Hodge – engineer (vocals)
- Brad Yost – engineer (assistant), audio mixing
- Xavier Smith – engineer (assistant), audio mixing
- Bob Ludwig – mastering

== Charts ==
=== Weekly charts ===
Weekly chart performance for "Through the Rain"
Chart (2002–2003)	Peak position
Australia (ARIA)	15
Austria (Ö3 Austria Top 40)	45
Belgium (Ultratop 50 Flanders)	44
Belgium (Ultratop 50 Wallonia)	29
Canada (Nielsen SoundScan)	5
Canada Airplay (Nielsen BDS)	93
Canada AC (Nielsen BDS)	38
Croatia (HRT)	8
Denmark (Tracklisten)	13
Europe (European Hot 100 Singles)	11
France (SNEP)	22
Germany (GfK)	36
Ireland (IRMA)	16
Italy (FIMI)	7
Japan (Oricon)	26
Netherlands (Dutch Top 40)	11
Netherlands (Single Top 100)	9
New Zealand (Recorded Music NZ)	37
Norway (VG-lista)	15
Portugal (AFP)	5
Romania (Romanian Top 100)	22
Scottish Singles Sales (Official Charts)	15
Spain (Promusicae)	1
Sweden (Sverigetopplistan)	7
Switzerland (Schweizer Hitparade)	7
UK Singles (Official Charts)	8
UK Hip Hop/R&B (Official Charts)	4
US Billboard Hot 100	81
US Adult Contemporary (Billboard)	17
US Dance Club Songs (Billboard) Full Intention, M. Joshua, & H. Hector mixes	1
US Dance Singles Sales (Billboard) Hex Hector/Mac Quayle remix	1
US Hot R&B/Hip-Hop Songs (Billboard)	69
US Pop Airplay (Billboard)	26
US Adult Contemporary (Radio & Records)	16
US CHR/Pop (Radio & Records)	27
US Top 40 Tracks (Billboard)	38
US Urban AC (Radio & Records)	24

=== Year-end charts ===
2002 year-end performance for "Through the Rain"
Chart (2002)	Position
Canada (Nielsen SoundScan)	22
Netherlands (Dutch Top 40)	137
Sweden (Hitlistan)	83
Switzerland (Schweizer Hitparade)	98
US Adult Contemporary (Radio & Records)	59

2003 year-end performance for "Through the Rain"
Chart (2003)	Position
Netherlands (Dutch Top 40)	183
US Dance Club Play (Billboard) Full Intention, M. Joshua, & H. Hector mixes	26
US Dance Singles Sales (Billboard) Hex Hector/Mac Quayle remix	2
US Adult Contemporary (Radio & Records)	79
US Urban AC (Radio & Records)	92

== Certifications ==
Certifications and sales for "Through the Rain"
Region	Certification	Certified units/sales
Canada (Music Canada)	Gold	5,000^{^}
^{^} Shipments figures based on certification alone.

== Release history ==
Release dates and formats for "Through the Rain"
Region	Date	Format(s)	Ref(s).
United States	September 30, 2002	Contemporary hit; adult contemporary; hot AC radio	
United States	October 14, 2002	Rhythmic contemporary; urban AC; urban radio	
Australia	November 11, 2002	CD 1; CD 2	
Europe	November 11, 2002	—	
Japan	November 13, 2002	CD	
Belgium	November 14, 2002	CD	
United Kingdom	November 18, 2002	CD	
Canada	November 19, 2002	CD	
Cyprus	November 21, 2002	CD 2	
Greece	November 21, 2002	CD 2	
United States	November 21, 2002	Digital download	
United States	December 10, 2002	2× 12-inch vinyl	
United States	February 4, 2003	CD	

== Cover versions ==
The song was covered by several Asian artists. In 2003, singer Regine Velasquez performed a live rendition of "Through the Rain" as part of an intimate concert that was later broadcast on Asian television.

The song was also covered by Rachelle Ann Go in the 2004 singing competition Search for a Star as her winning song. Additionally, while promoting her debut EP in the Philippines in 2007, Charice Pempengco sang an a cappella version of the song's bridge and climax. Nasser Amparna also cover the song on 2018 for the soundtrack of Waves of Life on Philippines. Additionally, his cover is his most-streamed song on Spotify.

== See also ==
- List of number-one dance singles of 2003 (U.S.)
