= Charmbracelet =

Studio album by Mariah Carey
- Released: November 20, 2002
- Recorded: March–September 2002
- Studios: Henson, Enterprise 2, The Record Plant, The Village Recorder, Westlake Audio, The Womb, Studio Atlantis (Los Angeles, California); SouthSide, Zac (Atlanta, Georgia); Capri Digital, Capro (Capri, Italy); Quad, Right Track (New York, New York); Compass Point (Nassau, Bahamas); Flyte Tyme (Edina, Minnesota); The Studio (Philadelphia, Pennsylvania)
- Genre: R&B
- Length: 64:36
- Labels: MonarC; Island Def Jam
- Producers: Mariah Carey; Jimmy Jam and Terry Lewis; Just Blaze; Randy Jackson; Jermaine Dupri; Damizza; Dre & Vidal; James "Big Jim" Wright; Bryan-Michael Cox

Mariah Carey chronology
Greatest Hits (2001)	Charmbracelet (2002)	The Remixes (2003)

Singles from Charmbracelet
- 1. "Through the Rain" Released: September 30, 2002; 2. "Boy (I Need You)" Released: November 26, 2002; 3. "Bringin' On the Heartbreak" Released: June 2, 2003

Charmbracelet is the ninth studio album by American singer-songwriter Mariah Carey. It was released on November 20, 2002, through MonarC Entertainment and Island Def Jam. The album was Carey's first release since her breakdown following the release of her film Glitter (2001) and its accompanying soundtrack album. Critics described Charmbracelet as one of Carey's most personal records, following 1997's Butterfly. Throughout the project, she collaborated with several musicians, including Jermaine Dupri, Jimmy Jam and Terry Lewis, 7 Aurelius and Dre & Vidal.

According to Carey, love is the album's main theme, and the songs combine introspective and personal themes with celebration and fun. The album contains a mixture of R&B beats, and the songs incorporate elements of other genres, such as gospel and soul. Compared to Glitter, which featured a variety of sampled melodies from the 1980s, Charmbracelet has a softer hip hop and R&B sound to it. Cam'ron, Jay-Z and Freeway also appear on the album.

Charmbracelet received mixed reviews, with some critics praising Carey's return to her core audience while others criticized the album's production. The album debuted at number three on the US Billboard 200 chart, and sold 241,000 copies in its first week. Internationally, the album reached the top-ten in Japan and Switzerland, peaked inside the top-forty in seven other countries, and has sold over three million copies worldwide. Three singles were released to promote the album. The lead single, "Through the Rain" reached number one in Spain and peaked inside the top-ten in Canada, Switzerland, Sweden, Italy and the United Kingdom. In the US, it topped the Hot Dance Club Play chart, but stalled at number 81 on the Billboard Hot 100. The two following singles failed to make an impact on the charts.

To promote the album, Carey embarked on the Charmbracelet World Tour (2003-2004) and performed on televised programs such as the 30th Annual American Music Awards, Today, The View, the Soul Train Music Awards and The Oprah Winfrey Show. Internationally, she traveled to several countries to promote the record, including a performance on the Brazilian program Fantástico, in addition to several acoustic performances and interviews on MTV Europe and MTV UK.

== Background ==
"I had worked myself very very hard for many many years and I never took a break, and last year, I had just become very very exhausted and ended up just not really in a good place physically and emotionally. I learned a little more about how to work hard but also how to be healthy and take care of myself, and now, in general, in my life, I'm in a really good, happy place."

— Carey, The San Diego Union-Tribune.

Before the release of Charmbracelet, Carey experienced a year of critical, commercial and personal struggles, following the poor reception of her debut film Glitter (2001) and its accompanying soundtrack, as well as her subsequent hospitalization. After divorcing her husband, Tommy Mottola, Carey released Butterfly (1997). With her next release, Rainbow (1999), Carey incorporated elements of R&B and hip hop into her music, particularly on the lead single "Heartbreaker". According to The Sacramento Bee, she attempted to sound more "ghetto". She stopped working with longtime pop producers such as Babyface and Walter Afanasieff, in order to pursue a new sound and audience, and worked with writers Sean Combs and Jermaine Dupri. Following the worldwide success of Rainbow, Carey left Columbia Records. Controversially, Mottola and executive Benny Medina in 1999 used several songs Carey had written and co-written for Jennifer Lopez. Carey's 2001 film debut Glitter was panned by movie critics, and earned less than eight million dollars at the box office.

Carey's $100 million recording contract was bought out by Virgin Records for $28 million. Carey checked into a hospital in Connecticut, following a controversial appearance on Total Request Live, in which she gave ice cream to fans, left troubling messages on her website and demonstrated what was considered by the media as "erratic behavior". Carey said she had an "emotional and physical breakdown." After a fortnight's hospitalization, Carey flew to Capri, Italy, where she stayed for five months and began writing and producing material for a new studio album about her recent troubles. She was signed by Island Records, and started her own imprint, MonarC Entertainment, for her intended "comeback" release, Charmbracelet.

== Development and recording ==
"The experience of recording this album is almost like the experience of my life—going through it dealing with things and trying to be hopeful. It's not an album filled with woe and misery. There are some songs that will give you that melancholy feeling, but I try to always go to the uplifting even in a situation that seems that it could break you. I try to always turn to the positive rather than drown in the negative."

— Carey on the album's sound to Radio and Records

Carey started writing songs for the album in early 2002, before she signed the record deal. She decided to rest, traveled to Capri and moved into a recording studio where she could focus on writing and recording without distractions. Most of the album was recorded in Capri, although she traveled to Atlanta, New York and Philadelphia to record some tracks. That year, Carey claimed Charmbracelet to be the "most personal album" she had ever made. She worked with longtime collaborators Jermaine Dupri, Jimmy Jam and Terry Lewis and Randy Jackson and other songwriters and producers 7 Aurelius, Just Blaze, Damizza and Dre & Vidal. The opening track and the first track to be written for the album, "Through the Rain", was written by Carey and Lionel Cole, was inspired Carey's recent experiences, and was co-produced by Jam and Lewis. It was released as the lead single from the album.

Jam, Lewis and Carey also worked "Yours", which Jam said contains "probably one of the best hooks [ever]", and likened it to one of trio's previous collaborations, "Thank God I Found You" (2000). Initially, the song was recorded as a duet with pop singer Justin Timberlake. However, due to contractual complications, it was never released and a solo version was featured on the album. Jam and Lewis produced two more songs, "Wedding Song" and "Satisfy"—the latter featuring background vocals from Michael Jackson—which were not released on the album.

Carey decided to work with Just Blaze after she heard the song "Oh Boy", which he produced for Cam'ron. Just Blaze and Carey produced "Boy (I Need You)", a remake of "Oh Boy", and "You Got Me". Carey said "Boy (I Need You)" was one of her favorites on the album. "You Got Me" features rap verses from Jay-Z and Freeway, was noted by Carey as a "signature Just Blaze track". Jay-Z was in Capri on vacation, and went to the studio to hear the song and said that he wanted to contribute to it and added rap verses of his own. Dupri produced "The One" and "You Had Your Chance". He said that they wanted to stick to the "same familiar sound" from his previous collaborations with Carey. Carey said "The One" was a personal song, which was about being hurt in past relationships and the uncertainty about forming new ones. Carey decided to experiment with a live band for the album. In April 2002, she met 7 Aurelius and asked him to produce songs for the album. They flew to Nassau, Bahamas and recorded a mixture of mid-tempo and up-tempo tracks and ballads with a live band. 7 Aurelius said that Carey was "an amazing writer" and described the process of recording:

We did three or four songs in three or four days. The way we was doing it, I had [a horn section] down there along with me. We had the whole room set up with candles, some nice wine—[it was] a very good vibe. It was completely stripped down, like 'Mariah Carey Unplugged'. She stripped herself down to her talent. She was really trusting of me and my vision, and I was trusting of who she was.

"Charm bracelets have always had a personal and sentimental significance for me. Charms are like pieces of yourself that you pass on to other people, items that tell your story and that can be shared, like a song. The bracelet represents the foundation of this album, a body of work that encompasses many feelings."

— Carey on the title of the album, Charmbracelet.

Randy Jackson contributed to four tracks on the album, and said it was "the most real and honest record she's made. She didn't care what anyone thought of the lyrics. They were only important to her." Carey included a cover of Def Leppard's song "Bringin' On the Heartbreak". During the photo shoot for Charmbracelet at Capri, Carey happened to listen to Def Leppard's greatest hits album Vault (1995), which contains the song, and decided to cover it. In an interview with Billboard, Carey said that the song is "an example of her musical diversity". Jackson also worked on "My Saving Grace", which Carey said describes her thoughts about the writing, recording and mastering process. While working in Capri, Carey's father became ill with cancer and she returned to New York to spend some time with him; he died soon after. In his memory, Carey wrote and produced the song "Sunflowers for Alfred Roy". Carey said that the song represents "his side of the family and is kind of hard to talk about." The song proved to be "very emotional" for Carey, and she sang it only once in the studio. DJ Quik also produced songs for the album, but none of them were included.

== Composition ==
Charmbracelet is primarily an R&B album, though its genre classification has been the subject of some debate. NME remarked that the album is "nominally R&B, much like Tony Blair is nominally a socialist", suggesting a loose adherence to the genre's conventions. Carey's signature blend of pop and hip-hop remains central throughout the record, but she also incorporates unexpected elements, such as the "fascinatingly overblown orchestral remake" of Def Leppard's "Bringin' On the Heartbreak", as noted by Rolling Stone. According to Carey, the album's central theme is love, with the songs combining introspective and personal reflections with moments of celebration and levity. In an interview with Blender, she explained the album's title: "It's called Charmbracelet because charms are like pieces of yourself that you pass on to other people, like a song". Slant Magazine characterized the project as a continuation of Carey's pop-hip-hop fusion, remarking that the album "reprises the singer's now-signature mix of hip-hop and pop, but throws in a few happy surprises along the way". Critics described Charmbracelet as one of Carey's most personal records, following 1997's Butterfly.

=== Songs ===
"Subtle Invitation"
A sample of the song's bridge, which makes use of a live orchestral band. With the chorus speaking of loyalty to an ex-lover through difficult times, Carey's energy increases towards the song's finale, leading to a heightened key.

Carey attempted to make a musical comeback with Charmbracelet, which focused on bringing Carey back to her R&B and soul roots in an attempt to recapture her audience. Critics both praised and criticized the condition of Carey's voice on the album; many called the songs average, and felt that most lacked sufficient hooks. The album's lead single, and Carey's boldest attempt at recreating the ballads from the early years of her career, was "Through the Rain", which was produced by Carey, and was described by one critic as "the sort of self-help ballad Ms. Carey was singing a decade ago". The songs on the album are a mixture of several genres.

Carey's cover of "Bringin' On the Heartbreak", was recorded using live instrumentation, and was the album's third single. It begins as a "piano-driven slow jam", which is followed by a "dramatic chord progression" after the second chorus, and Carey's "precise and fluttery voice reaches incredible heights" as it "turns the power ballad into something more delicate." Kelefa Sanneh from The New York Times called "Yours" "a delectable combination of breathy vocals and playful rhythms." Barry Walters from Rolling Stone wrote that on "Yours", "Carey's lead vocals blend into choruses of overdubbed Mariah's cooing overlapping phrases. Circling these are choirs of more Mariahs singing harmonies and countermelodies. Topping it off are generous sprinklings of the singer's patented birdcalls, wails, sighs and whispers."

"Her carefully assembled new album resembles a computer preset in its soulless precision. But there's a reason. This tin Charmbracelet is a throwback to the soft and fuzzy Mariah the masses succumbed to in the 1990s before she began competing with DMX for street credibility. To bring in the customers, Carey delivers her parts here in the familiar high-pitched coo, sort of Minnie Riperton without soul, backed by just-press-play synth-strings and soft, sparkly keyboards."

— A writer from Los Angeles Daily News describing the album's production and vocals as a whole.

Critics considered "Subtle Invitation" to be one of the album's strongest songs because of its "well executed" jazz influence. The song begins with the sounds of people dining, then introduces the strong bassline and drums. Towards the end of the song, Carey belts out the climax. Sarah Rodman from The Boston Herald described it as fascinating and wrote, "it sounds as though Carey is singing in falsetto while still in her chest voice." "Clown" drew strong media attention, and its lyrical content led critics to speculate that Carey aimed it at rapper Eminem, who had publicly announced that he had had a relationship with Carey. Rodman said "Clown" was "languidly sinister", with lyrics such as, "I should've left it at 'I like your music too' ... You should never have intimated we were lovers / when you know very well we never even touched each other." Critics compared "I Only Wanted" with "My All"'s instrumentation and structure of verse, chorus and guitar solo. According to Sal Cinquemani from Slant Magazine, Carey makes vague allusions to her ex-husband Tommy Mottola with the line, "Wish I'd stayed beneath my veil". The song uses Latin-inspired guitar instrumentation and wind sounds as an additional backbone to the melody, and dripping water as its percussion.

"Sunflowers for Alfred Roy", one of the album's most personal songs, is named after Carey's father; she makes direct reference to him and a moment they shared at his death bed. The song is backed with a simple piano accompaniment, and Carey recounts a visit with her father in his hospital room: "Strange to feel that proud, strong man / Grip tightly to my hand."

== Singles ==
"Bringin' On the Heartbreak"
A 27-second sample of "Bringin' On the Heartbreak", featuring the guitar solo used to link the second chorus to the song's climax. The bridge is followed by Carey's use of her upper vocal registers.

Three singles were released from the album. The lead single, "Through the Rain" was released on September 24, 2002. It received mixed reviews from critics, some of whom said it was too similar to her earlier ballads, such as "Hero" and "Outside", while others praised Carey's vocals in the song. It was one of Carey's poorest-selling US singles, reaching number 81 on the US Billboard Hot 100 chart. However, it topped the Hot Dance Club Play charts and reached the top twenty of the Adult Contemporary chart. Outside the US, the single topped the Spanish charts and performed moderately elsewhere, peaking within the top ten in Canada, Switzerland, Sweden, Italy and the UK, and within the top 20 in Ireland, Australia, Norway and Denmark. The music video of "Through the Rain", directed by Dave Meyers, is based on the courtship and eloping of Carey's parents. Scenes of Carey singing in a street when rain starts to fall are juxtaposed with the story of a mixed-race couple who run away from their families, who oppose their relationship.

"Boy (I Need You)", which was released as the second single on November 26, 2002, received mixed reviews from critics. The single failed to make much impact on charts worldwide; it reached number 68 on the US Billboard Hip-Hop/R&B Songs chart and number 57 on the US Hot Singles Sales chart. Elsewhere, the song reached number 17 in the UK, and peaked within the top 40 in Australia, the Netherlands, Ireland and New Zealand. The music video for "Boy (I Need You)" was directed by Joseph Kahn and was filmed at Shibuya and Los Angeles. Initially, "The One" was scheduled to be released as the second single and the music video was shot for that song. However, halfway through the filming, the single was changed to "Boy (I Need You)". Described as "Speed Racer meets Hello Kitty meets me and Cam'ron" by Carey, the video incorporates elements of Japanese culture and features Carey's alter-ego Bianca.

The third single from the album was Carey's cover version of "Bringin' On the Heartbreak", released on November 25, 2003. Though it gained mostly positive reviews, it failed to chart on the Billboard Hot 100, but reached number five on the Hot Dance Club Play chart. Outside the US, the song saw its highest peak in Switzerland, reaching number 28 and staying on the charts for eight weeks. It also charted in Austria and the Wallonia region of Belgium. The music video for the song was directed by Sanaa Hamri. Another cut from the album, "Irresistible (Westside Connection)" charted at number 81 on the US Billboard Hip-Hop/R&B Songs.

== Promotion ==
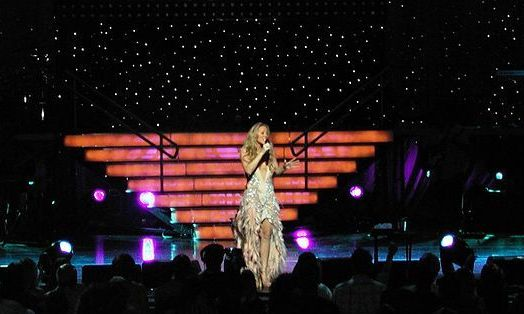
Carey performing "Hero" live during her Charmbracelet World Tour (2003–04)

Following the release of "Through the Rain", Carey embarked on several US and international promotional tours in support of Charmbracelet and its accompanying singles. Promotion for "Through the Rain" began at the 2002 NRJ Awards, where Carey performed wearing a long black skirt and denim blazer. Three days before the album's US release, a one-hour program titled Mariah Carey: Shining Through the Rain, in which Carey was interviewed and sang several songs from Charmbracelet and her back catalog, aired on MTV. Carey addressed rumors of her breakdown and its cause, and spoke about the album and its inspiration, and conducted a question and answer session with fans. During the first month after the album's release, Carey appeared on several television talk shows. She launched her promotional tour on Today, where she performed four songs at Mall of America for a crowd of over 10,000. On December 2, Carey traveled to Brazil for South American promotion of Charmbracelet, appearing on the popular television program Fantástico. She sang "My All", and performed "Through the Rain" and "I Only Wanted" wearing a long pink gown. She also made a surprise appearance on Show da Virada, singing "Through the Rain" and "My All", while wearing a short silver dress. On December 3, 2002, Carey appeared on The Oprah Winfrey Show, where she performed "Through the Rain" and "My Saving Grace", and gave a highly publicized interview about her hospitalization. Before her breakdown, Carey had been booked for a private interview with ABC's Barbara Walters, executive producer of The View, following Glitter's release. Instead of giving Walters the full-coverage interview following Carey's return to the public eye, Island decided Oprah was more appropriate, and changed the appearance. Carey's interview with Matt Lauer on Dateline NBC aired the same evening.

On December 17, Carey performed "I Only Wanted" on The View after guest co-hosting the program. One month later, Carey was one of the headlining performers at the 30th annual American Music Awards, held on January 13, 2003. She performed "Through the Rain" alongside a live gospel choir, and wore a long black evening gown. During the performance, images of newspaper headlines reporting Carey's breakdown were projected on a large curtain behind her, with one reading, "When you fall down, you get back up." Carey received a standing ovation. In mid-February, Carey was the headline performer at the NBA all-star game, which was Michael Jordan's last game. She wore a long, purple, skin-tight Washington Wizards' dress, and performed "Boy (I Need You)", "My Saving Grace" and "Hero", which received a standing ovation and brought Jordan to tears. On March 1, 2003, Carey performed at the Soul Train Music Awards, sporting a retro-curled hairstyle and wearing a burgundy evening gown. She performed "My Saving Grace", and as at the American Music Awards, images of newspaper headlines and inspirational photographs were projected onto a large screen. Following the performance, Carey was awarded a lifetime achievement award for her contribution to music. Towards the end of March, Charmbracelet was released in Europe and Carey appeared on several television programs to promote the album. She performed the album's leading two singles on the British music chart show, Top of the Pops, and a similar set on The Graham Norton Show and Fame Academy. On the latter program, Carey was joined on stage by the show's finalists, who sang the climax on "Through the Rain" alongside her.

=== Tour ===
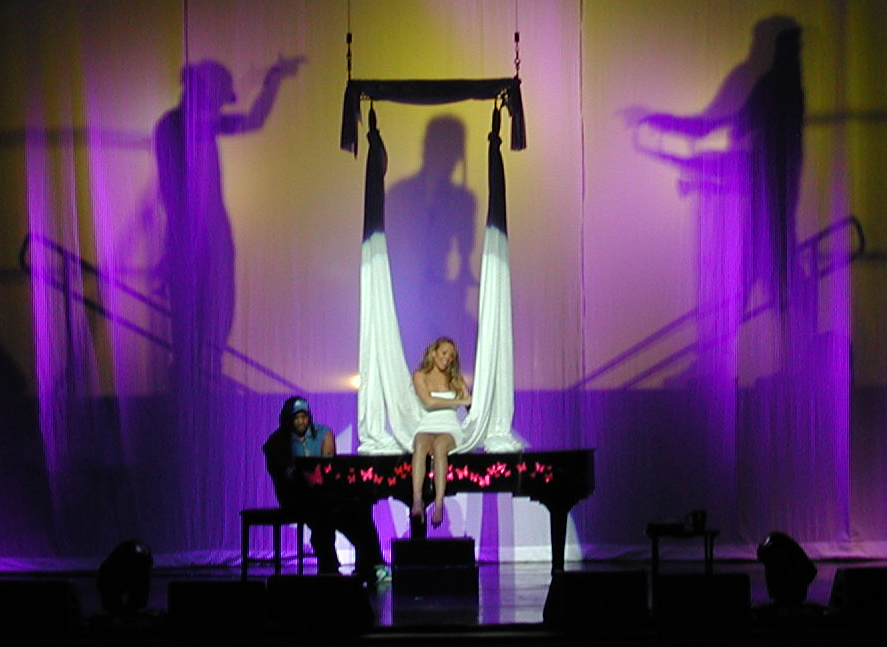
Carey performing "Subtle Invitation", seated on top of a piano, on the Charmbracelet World Tour (2003–04)

To promote the album, Carey announced the Charmbracelet World Tour in April 2003. The tour was her most extensive yet, lasting over eight months and performing 69 shows in venues worldwide. In the United States, the tour was marketed as "An Intimate Evening with Mariah Carey", with concerts being held in smaller venues. Carey expressed a desire to give fans more "intimate", Broadway-influenced shows. In contrast to the US leg of the tour, Carey performed in arenas for larger audiences in Asia and Europe. In the UK, it was Carey's first tour to feature shows outside London; she performed in Glasgow, Birmingham and Manchester. The Charmbracelet World Tour garnered generally positive reviews, with music critics and audiences praising the quality of Carey's live vocals and the production of the shows.

== Critical reception ==
Professional ratings
Aggregate scores
Source	Rating
Metacritic	43/100
Review scores
Source	Rating
AllMusic	2.5/5 stars
The Atlanta Journal-Constitution	B−
Entertainment Weekly	C
The Guardian	2/5 stars
The Province	1/5 stars
Rolling Stone	2/5 stars
Slant Magazine	3/5 stars
USA Today	3/4 stars
Yahoo! Music UK	3/10 stars
The Rolling Stone Album Guide	2/5 stars

Upon its release, Charmbracelet was released to mixed critical reception. Aggregator website Metacritic, which averages professional reviews into a numerical score, gave Charmbracelet a score of 43 out of 100, indicating "mixed or average reviews". Stephen Thomas Erlewine from AllMusic rated the album two and the half out of five stars, and criticized its production and the condition of Carey's voice. He wrote, "Whenever she sings, there's a raspy whistle behind her thin voice and she strains to make notes throughout the record ... Her voice is damaged, and there's not a moment where it sounds strong or inviting." Tom Sinclair of Entertainment Weekly said she was "in fine voice". He wrote that "Through the Rain" sinks in its own sodden sentimentality, as do by-the-numbers efforts like 'Yours' and 'I Only Wanted' ", and added that "'Clown' is a moody number graced with mournful acoustic guitar and a gorgeously nuanced vocal, while 'Sunflowers for Alfred Roy' is a short, sweet song sung to a lovely piano accompaniment". He finished by saying that "too much of Charmbracelet is mired in middle-of-the-road muck."

Billboard editor Michael Paoletta praised Carey's return to her core audience. He said that although Carey might have alienated her hip hop followers from her previous three albums, her older fans from the 1990s would be more receptive to the material and her new image. Kelefa Sanneh from The New York Times wrote that the album "is generally pleasant, although it's not always exciting, and a few of the collaborations go awry". He called Carey's voice "invariably astonishing", and said that "she can hit high notes that barely sound human", praised her versatility, and wrote that she "also knows how to make a hip-hop hit by holding back and letting the beat shine." Ethan Browne of New York slated the album's whimsical chimes and tinkling keyboards, and wrote, "Was Charmbracelet recorded in a Casio shop? This instrument needs to be stopped."

Rating Charmbracelet two out of five stars, Barry Walters from Rolling Stone wrote that none of the songs were bold, that the lack of hooks made the album weak, and said, "Carey needs bold songs that help her use the power and range for which she is famous. Charmbracelet is like a stream of watercolors that bleed into a puddle of brown." Sal Cinquemani from Slant Magazine complimented Carey's mixture of pop and hip hop melodies, and wrote, "Though there's nothing as immediate as 'Fantasy' or 'My All' here, Charmbracelet is significantly less contrived than 1999's Rainbow and almost as creatively liberating as Butterfly. British columnist Angus Batey, writing for Yahoo! Music UK called the songs on Charmbracelet forgettable, and wrote, "She used to take risks, but Charmbracelet is conservative, unadventurous and uninspiring; and, while it's understandable that simply to make another record marks a triumph of sorts, it's impossible to admire Mariah to the degree that her talent ought to merit." John Mulvey from NME criticized its content, writing, "Nominally, Charmbracelet is R&B, much like Tony Blair is nominally a socialist ... Tragedies, all told, have been worse"

At the 17th Japan Gold Disc Award in 2003, the album was nominated in the category of Rock and Pop Album of the Year (International).

== Commercial performance ==
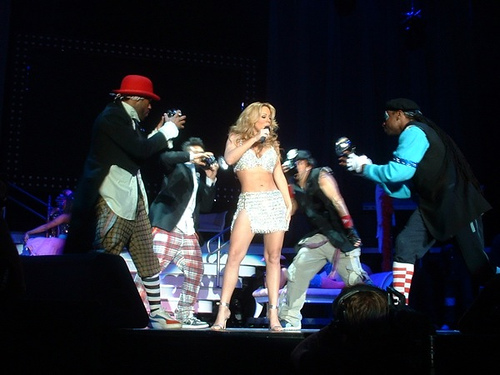
Carey and her dancers performing "Heartbreaker" on the Charmbracelet Tour in 2003

Charmbracelet was initially slated for release in the US on December 10, 2002. However, the date was revised to December 3, 2002. It was released through Island Records and Carey's label MonarC Entertainment. A highly anticipated release, it debuted at number three on the US Billboard 200, with first-week sales of 241,000 units, more than the first-week sales of the critically panned Glitter soundtrack, but fewer than 1999's Rainbow, which sold 323,000 units in its first week. Next week, the album fell to number fourteen, despite selling a further 173,000 units. It stayed on the chart for 22 weeks. Charmbracelet was certified Platinum by the Recording Industry Association of America (RIAA) for shipments of one million units in the US. As of April 2013, the estimated sales of the album in the US (compiled by Nielsen Soundscan) were 1,166,000 copies which was a slight improvement over the sales of Glitter.

In Canada, the album debuted and peaked on the Canadian Albums Chart at number 30. This placement was a decline in contrast to Glitter, which debuted at number four on the chart. It was certified Gold by the Canadian Recording Industry Association (CRIA) for shipments of 50,000 copies. On the week dated December 15, 2002, Charmbracelet entered the Australian Albums Chart at its peak position of number 42. It exited the chart the next week, becoming one of Carey's lowest charting albums in the country. In Japan, Charmbracelet debuted at number four on the Oricon Albums Chart, its second-highest peak worldwide, and sold 63,365 units in its first week. The album spent another week at number four, and sold 71,206 units. It stayed on the charts for a total of 15 weeks and according to Oricon, has sold 240,440 copies. The Recording Industry Association of Japan (RIAJ) certified Charmbracelet platinum for shipments of 200,000 copies.

In Austria, the album peaked at number 34 and stayed on the charts for seven weeks. In the Flemish region of Belgium it charted and peaked at number 48 and reached number 28 in the Walloon region of that country. Charmbracelet entered the French Albums Chart at number 20 in the week dated December 7, 2002, spent 30 weeks on the chart and was certified Gold by the Syndicat National de l'Édition Phonographique (SNEP), denoting shipments of 100,000 units. Charmbracelet charted and peaked at number 32 in Germany It reached number 50 in Sweden. In Switzerland, the album peaked at number nine on the Swiss Albums Chart and stayed on the charts for 10 weeks; it was certified Gold by the International Federation of the Phonographic Industry (IFPI). In the United Kingdom, the album peaked at number 52, selling 19,000 copies in its first week. It has sold a total of 122,010 copies as of April 2008. In February 2003, it was certified Gold by the British Phonographic Industry (BPI) for shipments of 100,000 copies in the UK. In the Netherlands, the album debuted at number 48, the issue dated December 14, 2002. The following week, it peaked at number 30. It stayed on the charts for 19 weeks, and made two re-entries, one in June 2003 and other in August 2003.

Charmbracelet was certified Gold in both Brazil and Hong Kong by Associação Brasileira dos Produtores de Discos (ABPD) and IFPI Hong Kong respectively. The album has sold over three million copies worldwide.

== Re-release ==
While preparing for the Asian leg of the Charmbracelet World Tour, Carey announced that Charmbraclet would be re-released with four additional tracks in Europe and Asia on July 26, 2003 – the first day of the North American leg of the tour. Carey included her duet with Busta Rhymes, "I Know What You Want", which was released as a single from his album, It Ain't Safe No More (2002), and became Carey's highest-charting song internationally in 2003, reaching top five peaks in Australia, Canada, the Netherlands, Ireland, Italy, Switzerland, the US and the UK. In an interview with Carson Daly, Carey said, "The Busta Rhymes duet ... has become so successful and we always said I would put it on my album as well." The re-release also included "There Goes My Heart", "Got a Thing 4 You" featuring Da Brat and Elephant Man, and "The One (So So Def Remix)" featuring Bone Crusher. The re-released version of the album charted for three weeks on the Oricon album chart in Japan, where it peaked at number 96 on the issue dated July 14, 2003.

== Track listing ==
No.	Title	Writer(s)	Producer(s)	Length
1.	"Through the Rain"	Mariah Carey; Lionel Cole	Carey; Jimmy Jam; Terry Lewis; James "Big Jim" Wright	4:48
2.	"Boy (I Need You)" (featuring Cam'ron)	Carey; Justin Smith; Norman Whitfield; Cameron Giles	Carey; Just Blaze	5:14
3.	"The One"	Carey; Bryan-Michael Cox; Jermaine Dupri	Carey; Cox; Dupri	4:08
4.	"Yours"	Carey; James Harris III; T. Lewis; Wright	Carey; Jam; T. Lewis; Big Jim	5:06
5.	"You Got Me" (featuring Jay-Z and Freeway)	Carey; Shawn Carter; Leslie Pridgen; Smith	Carey; Just Blaze	4:22
6.	"I Only Wanted"	Carey; Cole	Carey; Randy Jackson	3:38
7.	"Clown"	Carey; Vidal Davis; Andre Harris; Mary Ann Tatum	Carey; Dre & Vidal	3:17
8.	"My Saving Grace"	Carey; Kenneth Crouch; R. Jackson; Trevor Lawrence	Carey; R. Jackson	4:09
9.	"You Had Your Chance"	Carey; Cox; Dupri; Leon Haywood	Carey; Cox; Dupri	4:22
10.	"Lullaby"	Carey; Davis; A. Harris	Carey; Dre & Vidal	4:56
11.	"Irresistible (West Side Connection)" (featuring Westside Connection)	Carey; O'Shea Jackson; Quincy Jones III; Theodore Life; Dexter Wansel; Damion Young	Carey; Damizza	5:04
12.	"Subtle Invitation"	Carey; Marcus Vest; R. Jackson; Kenneth Crouch; Lloyd Smith; Rob Bacon	Carey; Channel 7	4:27
13.	"Bringin' On the Heartbreak"	Steve Clark; Joe Elliott; Pete Willis	Carey; R. Jackson	4:34
14.	"Sunflowers for Alfred Roy"	Carey; Cole	Carey; R. Jackson	2:59
15.	"Through the Rain" (Remix) (featuring Joe and Kelly Price)	Carey; Crouch; R. Jackson	Carey; Just Blaze	3:32
Total length:				64:36

UK bonus tracks
No.	Title	Writer(s)	Producer(s)	Length
16.	"Miss You" (with Jadakiss)	Carey; Cox; Dupri; J. T. Phillips; Terry Etling; Linda Laurie	Carey; Cox; Dupri	5:10
17.	"I Know What You Want" (with Busta Rhymes featuring the Flipmode Squad)	Trevor G. Smith Jr.; Leroy Jones; Rashia Fisher; Ricardo Thomas; Roger McNair; William Lewis	Thomas; Darren Rap; Mike Zinczenko	5:27
Total length:				75:13

Asian Tour Edition bonus disc
No.	Title	Writer(s)	Producer(s)	Length
1.	"There Goes My Heart"	Carey; Irving Lorenzo; Marcus Vest; Lloyd L Smith	Carey; Vest	4:11
2.	"I Know What You Want" (with Busta Rhymes and the Flipmode Squad)	T. Smith; Jones; Fisher; Thomas; McNair; W. Lewis	Thomas; Rap; Zinczenko	4:16
3.	"Got a Thing 4 You" (with Da Brat featuring Elephant Man)	Robert Caldwell; Shawntae Harris; L.T. Hutton; Alfons Kettner	S. Harris; Hutton	5:02
4.	"The One" (So So Def remix) (featuring Bone Crusher)	Carey; Dupri; Cox	Carey; Dupri; Cox	4:38
5.	"Through the Rain" (video)
6.	"Boy (I Need You)" (video)
Total length:				18:07

Notes

- "Boy (I Need You)" contains samples of "Oh Boy" by Cam'ron and "Call Me" by Tweet.
- "You Had Your Chance" contains a sample of "I Want'a Do Something Freaky to You" by Leon Haywood.
- "Irresistible (Westside Connection)" contains a sample of "You Know How We Do It" by Ice Cube.
- "Bringin' On the Heartbreak" is a cover of "Bringin' On the Heartbreak" by Def Leppard.

== Personnel ==
Credits for Charmbracelet taken from the album's liner notes.

- Mariah Carey – producer, executive producer, vocals, background vocals
- Asif Ali – engineer
- Florian Ammon – digital editing, audio mixing, vocal engineer
- Giulio Antognini – assistant engineer
- Bobby Ross Avila – guitar
- Rob Bacon – guitar, electric guitar
- Karen Elaine Bakunin – viola
- Charlie Bisharat – String Quartet, strings
- Printz Board – trumpet
- Oswald "Wiz" Bowe – assistant engineer
- Denyse Buffum – viola
- Eve Butler – string quartet, strings
- Cam'ron – rap
- David Campbell – string arrangements
- Darius Campo – string quartet, strings
- Shawn Carter – featured artist
- Dana Jon Chappelle – engineer, vocal engineer
- Susan Chatman – string quartet, strings
- Andrew Chavez – assistant engineer
- Lionel Cole – piano, synthesizer bass
- Larry Corbett – cello
- Bryan-Michael Cox – producer
- Kenneth Crouch – bass, Fender Rhodes, keyboard
- Damizza – producer
- Melonie Daniels – background vocals
- Vidal Davis – mixing
- Mario Diaz de Leon – string quartet, strings
- Joel Derouin – string quartet, strings
- Vincent Dilorenzo – assistant engineer
- DJ Vice – programming
- Karen Dreyfus – viola
- Jermaine Dupri – mixing, producer
- Elizabeth Dyson – cello
- Brian Frye – engineer
- Matt Funes – viola
- Kevin G. – engineer
- Armen Garabedian – string quartet, strings
- Paul Gregory – assistant engineer, engineer
- Kevin Guarnieri – digital editing, engineer
- Matt Gunes – viola
- Mick Guzauski – mixing
- Reggie Hamilton – bass
- Dawn Hannay – viola
- Andre Harris – mixing
- David Ryan Harris – guitar
- Steve Hodge – engineer, mixing
- John Horesco IV – assistant
- Randy Jackson – bass, bass guitar, percussion, producer
- Jimmy Jam – guitar, instrumentation, producer
- Eric Johnson – acoustic guitar
- Just Blaze – instrumentation, producer
- Suzie Katayama – cello, string contractor
- Gimel "Young Guru" Katon – mixing
- Steve Kempster – string mixing, track engineer
- Peter Kent – string quartet, strings
- Kevin G. – engineer
- Ann Kim – violin
- Lisa Kim – violin
- Myung Hi Kim – violin
- Melissa Kleinbart – violin
- Soohyun Kwon – violin
- Trevor Lawrence – drum programming
- Jeanne LeBlanc – cello
- John Lemkuhi – percussion, Sound design
- Ken Lewis – mixing
- Terry Lewis – guitar, instrumentation, producer
- Liza Lim – violin
- Trey Lorenz – background vocals
- Bob Ludwig – mastering
- Mario Deleon – strings
- Rob Mathes – conductor, string arrangements
- Jeremy McCoy – bass
- Melanie Daniels – background vocals
- Colin Miller – engineer
- Ann Mincieli – assistant engineer
- Tadd Mingo – assistant engineer
- John D. Mitchell – drum programming
- Bill Molina – engineer
- Billy Odum – guitar
- William Odum – guitar
- Tim Olmstead – assistant engineer
- Suzanne Ornstein – violin
- Alyssa Park – string quartet, strings
- Sara Parkins – string quartet, strings
- John Patitucci – bass
- Kelly Price – singing, background vocals
- Michelle Richards – string quartet, strings
- Steve Richards – cello, strings
- Alexander Richbourg – drum programming, vocal programming
- Robert Rinehart – viola
- Tom Rosenthal – viola
- Jeff Rothschild – assistant engineer
- Laura Seaton – violin
- 7 Aurelius – producer, programming
- Andrew Sherman – piano
- Jaime Sickora – assistant engineer
- Dexter Simmons – mixing
- Fiona Simon – violin
- Carl "Butch" Small – percussion
- John Smeltz – engineer, mixing
- Dan Smith – cello, strings
- Daniel Smith – cello
- Xavier Smith – assistant, assistant engineer
- Jay Spears – assistant engineer, digital editing
- Brian Springer – engineer
- Brian Sumner – assistant engineer
- Phil Tan – engineer, mixing
- Mary Ann Tatum – background vocals
- Lesa Terry – string quartet, strings
- Michael Thompson – guitar, classical guitar, steel guitar
- Jeremy Turner – cello
- German Villacorta – assistant engineer
- Seth Waldman – assistant engineer
- Evan Wilson – viola
- John Wittenberg – string quartet, strings
- Mary Wooten – cello
- Jason Wormer – assistant engineer
- James "Big Jim" Wright – producer
- Sharon Yamada – violin
- Jung Sun Yoo – violin
- Bradley Yost – assistant engineer
- Antony Zeller – assistant engineer

== Charts ==
=== Weekly charts ===
Chart (2002–2003)	Peak position
Australian Albums (ARIA)	42
Australian Urban Albums (ARIA)	6
Austrian Albums (Ö3 Austria)	34
Belgian Albums (Ultratop Flanders)	48
Belgian Albums (Ultratop Wallonia)	28
Canadian Albums (Nielsen SoundScan)	30
Canadian R&B Albums (Nielsen SoundScan)	7
Dutch Albums (Album Top 100)	30
European Albums (Top 100)	23
French Albums (SNEP)	12
German Albums (Offizielle Top 100)	32
Italian Albums (FIMI)	22
Japanese Albums (Oricon)	4
Scottish Albums (Official Charts)	87
South Korean Albums (RIAK)	1
Spanish Albums (PROMUSICAE)	24
Swedish Albums (Sverigetopplistan)	50
Swiss Albums (Schweizer Hitparade)	9
UK Albums (Official Charts)	52
UK R&B Albums (Official Charts)	16
US Billboard 200	3
US Top R&B/Hip-Hop Albums (Billboard)	2

Chart (2021)	Peak position
UK Albums Sales (OCC)	69
UK R&B Albums (Official Charts)	6

=== Year-end charts ===
Chart (2002)	Position
Canadian R&B Albums (Nielsen SoundScan)	40

Chart (2003)	Position
Japanese Albums (Oricon)	53
French Albums (SNEP)	121
US Billboard 200	61
US Top R&B/Hip-Hop Albums (Billboard)	40

== Certifications and sales ==
Region	Certification	Certified units/sales
Brazil (Pro-Música Brasil)	Gold	50,000^{*}
Canada (Music Canada)	Gold	50,000^{^}
France (SNEP)	Gold	100,000^{*}
Hong Kong (IFPI Hong Kong)	Gold	10,000^{*}
Japan (RIAJ)	Platinum	240,440
South Korea	—	54,730
Spain (Promusicae)	Gold	50,000^{^}
Switzerland (IFPI Switzerland)	Gold	20,000^{^}
United Kingdom (BPI)	Gold	122,010
United States (RIAA)	Platinum	1,170,000
Summaries
Worldwide	—	3,000,000
^{*} Sales figures based on certification alone.^{^} Shipments figures based on certification alone.

== Release history ==
Release dates and formats for Charmbracelet
Region	Date	Format(s)	Edition	Ref.
Japan	November 20, 2002	CD	Standard	
Poland	November 28, 2002	CD	Standard	
Australia	December 2, 2002	CD	Standard	
Austria	December 2, 2002	CD	Standard	
Germany	December 2, 2002	CD	Standard	
United Kingdom	December 2, 2002	CD	Standard	
Canada	December 3, 2002	CD	Standard	
South Korea	December 3, 2002	Cassette; CD	Standard	
United States	December 3, 2002	CD	Standard	
Belgium	December 4, 2002	CD	Standard	
Poland	December 5, 2002	Cassette	Standard	
New Zealand	December 9, 2002	CD	Standard	
Brazil	December 10, 2002	CD	Standard	
Japan	June 30, 2003	CD	Tour	

== Works cited ==
- Halstead, Craig; Cadman, Chris (2003). Michael Jackson the Solo Years. United Kingdom: Authors On Line Ltd. ISBN 0-7552-0091-8.
