= Lionel Cole =

American musician

Lionel Cole is an American pianist and composer. He has served as a regularly touring member of Mariah Carey's live band. Cole also partnered with Malcolm-Jamal Warner, to create the jazz and funk band Miles Long. The first album, The Many Facets of Superman, featured En Vogue's Cindy Heron and soul icon Teena Marie.

Cole co-wrote with Mariah Carey the Billboard chart single "Through the Rain", which appeared on Carey's ninth studio album Charmbracelet (2002). The song peaked at number 81 on the Billboard Hot 100 and hit number 1 on the U.S. sales and dance charts. Previously, Cole remixed the million selling cover single "Hard to Say I'm Sorry" by boy band AZ Yet. In 2010, Cole toured with 1980s star Rickie Lee Jones. From a storied musical family, he is the son of Freddy Cole, a jazz vocalist, the nephew of Nat King Cole, and the cousin of Natalie Cole.

Cole's music work extends into film and television, he composed for the Tim Reid film Once Upon a Time...When We Were Colored and the Showtime series Linc's.

== Biography ==
Lionel was born in New York City and grew up in Atlanta. He moved to Chicago to study singing at Northwestern University, then moved to Los Angeles. In 1986 and 1987, he traveled with Up with People (Cast 86C).

After moving to Los Angeles, he worked as a staff composer/music editor with award-winning producer Steve Tyrell on several television projects, including NBC's California Dreams and The Brady Bunch Movie. Cole moved on to film composing for Once Upon a Time...When We Were Colored.

Later he and Malcolm Jamal Warner (Theo from The Cosby Show) partnered to form the jazz/funk band, Miles Long. The Miles Long album The Many Facets of Superman featured En Vogue's Cindy Herron and soul icon Teena Marie. Cole had many roles on this project as lead singer, pianist and producer. In addition he did a turn as a featured vocalist in John Powell's score for The Bourne Identity (2002), a two-year stint as band leader on the television series Malcolm and Eddie and played piano with Ivan Neville and his ensemble.

Cole was featured as part of Robert Downey Jr.'s band on The Oprah Winfrey Show, the Tonight Show, Ellen, and Good Morning America.

Cole's work with singer Mariah Carey included piano playing on her number-one single "Never Too Far Hero", and co-writing three songs, notably the heartfelt hit "Through the Rain" from her multi-platinum album Charmbracelet. One of his proudest moments was arranging "The Star-Spangled Banner" for Carey and the Boston Pops at the 2002 Super Bowl following 9/11. He also was featured keyboarding and background singing for Carey's worldwide tour, which played to sold-out audiences. For the past few years Cole's creativity has focused on work with long-time writing partner Randy Jackson (of the television series American Idol).

Cole worked on countless projects including the Grammy-nominated Sam Moore (of Sam & Dave) album Overnight Sensation and the Grammy award-winning remake A Family Affair with Van Hunt, John Legend, and Joss Stone. That work lead to collaboration on "Walk On By", with pop prodigy Joss Stone featured on Randy Jackson's Music Club Volume 1. The team also worked on the films produced by Walmart family pictures. 2010 brought a world tour with 1980s icon Rickie Lee Jones as her singer and multi-instrumentalist. This also landed Cole in Sydney, Australia.

He currently resides in Sydney, Australia, with his family and performs regularly as lead singer with his band "Cole Soul and Emotion". In May 2014, he participated in The Voice on Channel 9, working with coaches Ricky Martin and Kylie Minogue.
