= Monarc Entertainment =

Defunct American record label owned by Mariah Carey

MonarC Entertainment
- Parent company: The Island Def Jam Music Group
- Founded: 2002
- Founder: Mariah Carey
- Defunct: 2004
- Status: Defunct
- Distributor: Island Records
- Genre: R&B; pop; hip hop; soul
- Country of origin: United States

MonarC Entertainment was an American record label formed by Mariah Carey, under Island Records. The name comes from Carey's well-documented fascination with butterflies. The only albums released with the Monarc Entertainment logo were Charmbracelet and The Remixes. In the summer of 2004, Carey reportedly shut down her MonarC label, as her subsequent releases were released under just Island Records alone. The label was founded by Mariah Carey and longtime music business executive Jerry Blair, supported by A&R power player Faith Newman (music executive), and radio promotions handled by veteran promoter Rick Hendrix.

== Artists ==
- Mariah Carey
- Trey Lorenz

== See also ==
- List of record labels
