= Your Girl =

2005 song by Mariah Carey

- "#MC30" EP artwork

Song by Mariah Carey

from the album The Emancipation of Mimi
- Released: March 30, 2005
- Recorded: 2004
- Studio: Honeywest (New York City)
- Length: 2:46
- Label: Island Def Jam
- Songwriters: Mariah Carey; Marc Shemer
- Producers: Scram Jones; Mariah Carey

"Your Girl" is a song recorded by American singer Mariah Carey for her tenth studio album, The Emancipation of Mimi (2005). She wrote the song with Marc Shemer, who also produced it with her under the name Scram Jones. The lyrics of "Your Girl" are about confidently approaching a potential lover. To convey this sentiment, Carey employs belting as part of her vocal performance. Influenced by disco, gospel, jazz, pop, and soul, the music drew comparisons with works by rapper Kanye West. It samples vocals and an acoustic guitar from the 2003 Adeaze song "A Life with You".

Some reviewers considered "Your Girl" as one of the best tracks on The Emancipation of Mimi; others criticized the vocals. Regretful that it was not issued as a single from the album, Carey later released two remixes featuring rappers Cam'ron, Juelz Santana, and N.O.R.E as part of a 2021 digital extended play. She performed the song live during the 2006 Adventures of Mimi concert tour and the 2024 Celebration of Mimi concert residency in Las Vegas.

== Background and release ==
Following the commercial and critical disappointments of her album Glitter (2001), American singer Mariah Carey opted to join the Island Def Jam record label and released Charmbracelet (2002). According to her, she intended to move on from singing elaborate ballads and instead create simpler and authentic compositions for its follow-up, The Emancipation of Mimi (2005). "Your Girl" is the tenth track on the album, which was released on March 30, 2005. Although it was one of her favorite tracks on the album, the song was never planned for release as a single. Carey wrote that it "should have been a single" in her 2020 memoir The Meaning of Mariah Carey.

Following its release on the album, "Your Girl" became a fan favorite. It did not receive significant airplay from radio stations. Entertainment Weekly writer Michael Slezak attributed this to other worthy tracks on The Emancipation of Mimi. According to Chris Gardner of The Hollywood Reporter, the song is a deep cut on the album in contrast to the commercially successful "We Belong Together", "Shake It Off", and "Say Somethin'". "Your Girl" was later promoted as part of the #MC30 campaign marking three decades of Carey's career in 2021. On January 29 that year, she issued an extended play to digital outlets containing a version featuring Diplomats members Cam'ron and Juelz Santana and a second remix featuring the rapper N.O.R.E. The former remix had previously been released on several mixtapes in 2006.

== Composition ==
Two minutes and forty-six seconds in length, "Your Girl" is the shortest song on The Emancipation of Mimi. Critics described it as a slow jam and a power ballad. Carey wrote the song with Marc Shemer, who also produced it with her under the stage name Scram Jones. The production took place at several locations in New York City. Dana Jon Chapelle and Brian Garten engineered the song with assistance from Rufus Morgen at Honeywest Studios. After Pat "Pat 'Em Down" Viala mixed it at Right Track Studios, Herb Powers mastered "Your Girl" at The Hit Factory. It features background vocals from Carey and Mary Ann Tatum.

"Your Girl" contains a sample from the 2003 Adeaze song "A Life with You", written and performed by New Zealanders Feagaigafou and Logovi'i Tupa'i. It incorporates the acoustic guitar part from "A Life with You" and speeds up a few lines of the duo's voices in the chorus. Scram Jones obtained clearance after performing at a party for Dawn Raid Entertainment, the record label to which Adeaze was signed. The arranger and guitarist of "A Life with You", Dominique Leauga, was not credited in Carey's release for his contributions.

"Your Girl"
Carey uses a belting vocal technique on "Your Girl".

The lyrics concern Carey confidently addressing a prospective lover. She conveys this through her singing by using belting, a full-throated technique common in musical theatre. Carey further expresses this confidence with lines like "I'm gonna make you want to get with me tonight" and assures him she will "put naughty thoughts into your mind". For Pitchfork's Julianne Escobedo Shepherd, the focus is on her assertiveness rather than a relationship. In The New York Times, Jon Pareles stated she uses an impersonal delivery. Carey described the song as "innocent, yet still a bit grimy".

Critics interpreted the composition's influences differently. According to Clayton Smales of the Townsville Bulletin, "Your Girl" is a pop-leaning song. Guy Blackman of The Sunday Age felt it has a "down-tempo disco feel", and Sal Cinquemani of Slant Magazine said it draws from the Motown sound. Slezak stated the chorus contains gospel influences; The Jakarta Post's Tony Hotland thought jazz and soul elements were present. Joey Guerra likened "Your Girl" to a retro soul record in the Houston Chronicle and Nick Marino called it "a simple old-school jam" in The Atlanta Journal-Constitution. Escobedo Shepherd said it was "based on the Kanye [West]-style, sped-up soul record trend that was aflame at the time" of recording. Todd Burns of Stylus Magazine also thought the production was influenced by West, and BBC Music writer Adam Webb viewed it as a revision of the "classic soul sound" common in Carey's previous work.

== Critical reception ==
The song's composition was a subject of critical commentary. According to Marino, the track's short length encouraged replays. Blackman and Slezak called the chorus catchy and Escobedo Shepherd said it was "an exercise in exhilaration". Billboard's Nolan Feeney wrote: "Anticipation and longing are hallmarks of many a great pop song, but sometimes you just have to cut to the point".

Carey's performance garnered a mixed reception. Her presence received positive feedback from Marino and from Kevin C. Johnson of the St. Louis Post-Dispatch, who both viewed her as exuding confidence. Carey's vocals received largely negative reviews. In comparing her voice to its state in the 1990s, Orlando Sentinel writer Jim Abbott argued it was better because she exercised more restraint, Milwaukee Journal Sentinel critic Dave Tianen said she used the same excessive style to bad effect, and Burns thought she sounded weaker. Andy Gill of The Independent said Carey's vocals were so histrionic as to make her "almost as bad as all the Pop Idol wannabes that reflect her disastrous influence".

"Your Girl" has appeared on rankings of Carey's music. Some critics called it the best or one of the best tracks on The Emancipation of Mimi. In 2005, Slezak listed "Your Girl" among the 10 best songs of her career. Escobedo Shepherd considered it one of Carey's top 20 tracks in a 2007 Vibe article. Billboard ranked it at number 38 on their 2020 list of Carey's 100 greatest songs.

== Live performances ==
Carey has performed "Your Girl" infrequently since its release. She sang it during her 2006 concert tour, The Adventures of Mimi. For the fifteenth anniversary of The Emancipation of Mimi in 2020, she uploaded an a cappella version to her social media accounts. This formed part of a series of at-home performances by Carey during the COVID-19 pandemic. It received a positive review from Billboard's Glenn Rowley, who said she "delivers vocals fit for the gods". In 2024, Carey gave her first live performance of "Your Girl" since 2006 at her Las Vegas concert residency, The Celebration of Mimi.

== Credits and personnel ==
- Recorded at Honeywest Studios, New York City
- Mixed at Right Track Studios, New York City
- Mastered at The Hit Factory, New York City

- Mariah Carey – songwriting, production, background vocals
- Marc Shemer/Scram Jones – songwriting, production
- Mary Ann Tatum – background vocals
- Dana Jon Chappelle, Brian Garten – engineering
- Rufus Morgen – assistant engineering
- Pat "Pat 'Em Down" Viala – mixing
- Herb Powers – mastering
