= The Adventures of Mimi (video) =

Video by Mariah Carey
- Released: November 16, 2007
- Recorded: October 8, 2006
- Venue: Honda Center (Anaheim, California)
- Genre: R&B
- Length: 165:00
- Label: Island; Artist Nation
- Director: Sanaa Hamri; Randy Jackson
- Producer: Mariah Carey; Benny Medina; Ken Ehrlich; Michael Cohl

Mariah Carey chronology
#1's (1999)	The Adventures of Mimi (2007)

Professional ratings
Review scores
Source	Rating
Bangor Daily News	B+
The Herald	2/5
MusicOMH	3/5 stars
New Straits Times	3/5 stars
People	3/5 stars
Toronto Sun	3/5 stars
Video Librarian	3/4 stars

The Adventures of Mimi is the seventh video release by American singer Mariah Carey. It documented her 2006 summer concert tour The Adventures of Mimi. It was released on Blu-ray disc on April 15, 2008. A new two-DVD set was released April 16, 2008 in Japan. A three-disc deluxe edition was released on April 15, 2008.

== History ==
The DVD was shot at her show in Anaheim, California on October 8, 2006 at Honda Center. It is Carey's first DVD release since #1's (1999), a compilation of music videos. The cover was photographed by Markus Klinko and Indrani. Unlike the other concerts in the tour, Boyz II Men made a guest appearance to perform "One Sweet Day".

On December 1, 2008, The Adventures of Mimi was re-released as a four-disc box set, E=MC² Adventure Box, also containing the album E=MC². The box set also includes a double-sided poster with one tour photo and one album photo, and a special logo key ring.

== Track listing ==
The Adventures of Mimi - Disc 1
No.	Title	Writer(s)	Length
1.	"Opening video"		0:24
2.	"It's Like That"	Mariah Carey; Johntá Austin; Douglas Davis; Jermaine Dupri; Isaac Freeman; Manuel Seal; Ricky Walters	3:54
3.	"Heartbreaker" (featuring Jay-Z, Missy Elliott, Da Brat, and DJ Clue)	Carey; Shawn Carter; Shirley Elliston; Lincoln Chase; Michael Walden; Jeffrey Cohen; Calvin Broadus; Ricardo Brown; Melissa Elliott; Warren Griffin; Nathaniel Hale; Andre Young; Shawntae Harris	4:08
4.	"Dreamlover"	Carey; Dave Hall; Dave Porter	5:19
5.	"My All"	Carey; Walter Afanasieff	4:15
6.	"Shake It Off"	Carey; Dupri; Bryan-Michael Cox; Austin	4:32
7.	"Vision of Love"	Carey; Ben Margulies	5:21
8.	"Fly Like a Bird"	Carey; James Wright	3:04
9.	"I'll Be There" (featuring Trey Lorenz)	Berry Gordy; Bob West; Hal Davis; Willie Hutch	4:26
10.	"Fantasy" (featuring O.D.B.)	Carey; Ol' Dirty Bastard; Hall; Chris Frantz; Tina Weymouth; Adrian Belew; Steven Stanley	5:06
11.	"Don't Forget About Us"	Carey; Dupri; Cox; Austin	4:12
12.	"Always Be My Baby"	Carey; Dupri; Seal	3:11
13.	"Honey" (featuring Jermaine Dupri, Da Brat, and Mase)	Carey; Mohandes Dewese; Berry Gordy; Stephen Hague; Ronald Larkins; Malcolm McLaren; Alphonso Mizell; Frederick Perren; Larry Price; Deke Richards; Bobby Robinson; Mason Betha; Sean "Puffy" Combs; Kamaal Fareed; Sean Jacobs; Steven Jordan; Jason Phillips; David Styles	5:02
14.	"I Wish You Knew"	Carey; Wright	2:17
15.	"Can't Let Go"	Carey; Afanasieff	2:11
16.	"One Sweet Day" (with Boyz II Men)	Carey; Afanasieff; Michael McCary; Nathan Morris; Wanya Morris; Shawn Stockman	5:56
17.	"Hero"	Carey; Afanasieff	4:28
18.	"Make It Happen"	Carey; Robert Clivillés; David Cole	5:50
19.	"We Belong Together"	Carey; Dupri; Seal; Johntá Austin; Kenneth Edmonds; Bobby Womack; Patrick Moten; Sandra Sully; Stanley Bristol; Sidney Johnson	3:21
20.	"Butterfly Reprise"	Carey; Elton John; David Morales; Bernard Taupin	2:28
21.	"Bonus feature: Behind-the-Scenes"		14:34
Total length:			93:59

The Adventures of Mimi - Disc 2
No.	Title	Length
1.	"The Adventures of Mimi Tour documentary"	34:16
2.	"Bonus feature: Karaoke - Shake It Off"	4:32
3.	"Bonus feature: Karaoke - Vision of Love"	5:07
4.	"Bonus feature: Karaoke - Honey"	5:19
5.	"Bonus feature: Karaoke - One Sweet Day"	5:16
6.	"Bonus feature: Karaoke - Hero"	4:23
7.	"Bonus feature: Karaoke - We Belong Together"	3:42
8.	"Bonus feature: Lovers and Haters"	4:46
9.	"Bonus feature: DVD credits"	1:00

== Charts and certifications ==
2007–2009 weekly chart performance
Region – Chart (Publisher)	Peak position
Australia – Music DVD (ARIA)	26
Japan – DVD (Oricon)	75
Netherlands – Music DVD (Dutch Charts)	21
Spain – Music DVD (Promusicae)	8
UK – Music Video (OCC)	10
US – Top Music Video (Billboard)	1

2008 year-end chart performance
Region – Chart (Publisher)	Position
US – Top Music Video Sales (Billboard)	15

List of certifications
Region	Certification	Certified units/sales
Brazil (Pro-Música Brasil)	2× Platinum	60,000^{*}
United States (RIAA)	Platinum	100,000^{^}
^{*} Sales figures based on certification alone.^{^} Shipments figures based on certification alone.

== Release history ==
Releases of The Adventures of Mimi
Region	Date	Format	Ref.
Austria	November 16, 2007	DVD	
Australia	November 26, 2007	DVD	
Japan	November 28, 2007	DVD	
Germany	November 30, 2007	DVD	
United States	December 4, 2007	DVD	
Germany	April 15, 2008	Blu-ray	
Belgium	August 18, 2008	DVD	
Japan	September 22, 2010	Blu-ray	
