= Mine Again =

Song by Mariah Carey

from the album The Emancipation of Mimi
- Released: April 12, 2005
- Recorded: 2004
- Studio: MSR Studios, New York City; Honeywest Studios, New York City.
- Genre: R&B; soul; neo soul
- Length: 4:01
- Label: Island
- Songwriters: Mariah Carey; James Poyser
- Lyricist: Mariah Carey
- Producers: Carey; Poyser

Audio
- "Mine Again" on YouTube

"Mine Again" is a song by American singer Mariah Carey from her tenth studio album The Emancipation of Mimi (2005). It was co-written and co-produced by Carey and James Poyser. It was recorded at MSR Studios and Honeywest Studios, both located New York City. It is a R&B and soul inspired ballad. The lyrics revolve around the protagonist wishing for a second chance at a seemingly failed relationship.

The song garnered positive reviews from music critics, praising Carey and Poyser's production and her vocal performance. Upon the release of The Emancipation of Mimi, "Mine Again" debuted on the US Hot R&B/Hip-Hop Songs chart at number 82, and reached a peak of number 73. In 2006, it was nominated for the Best Traditional R&B Performance at the 48th Annual Grammy Awards.

== Background ==
In 2001, Carey suffered a physical and emotional breakdown, causing her to abandon promotion of her then-released studio album Glitter (2001), and its accompanying film. Since she was hospitalized for exhaustion, the film project received strongly negative critical feedback, with the album faring slightly better. Following Carey's absence from the public eye, as well as her abandonment of promotional appearances for the film and soundtrack, her unprecedented $100 million five-album record deal with Virgin Records (EMI Records) was bought out for $50 million. After recovering and completing her contractual agreement with Virgin Records, Carey began recording her intended "comeback" and follow-up album, Charmbracelet (2002). The album focused on incorporating several inspirational ballads and re-capturing Carey's audience from the 1990s. However, critics took notice of Carey's different vocals.

As Glitter was an unsuccessful mixture of covers and dance music, Charmbracelet incorporated slower, contemporary melodies. In his review of the album, Stephen Thomas Erlewine criticized the album's content, describing Carey's voice as "in tatters". He wrote, "Whenever she sings, there's a raspy whistle behind her thin voice and she strains to make notes throughout the record. She cannot coo or softly croon, nor can she perform her trademark gravity-defying vocal runs. Her voice is damaged, and there's not a moment where it sounds strong or inviting." Though fueled by strong media attention regarding Carey's return to music, as well as her new deal with Island Records, the album failed to deliver the type of success she had been accustomed to throughout the 1990s, and only managed sales of five million copies globally. After the album's release, and its succeeding tour, Carey began conceptualizing and working on a new project, eventually titled The Emancipation of Mimi, her tenth studio effort. By November 2004, Carey had already recorded several songs for the album.

== Production and recording ==
"Mine Again" was co-written and co-produced by Carey and James Poyser. The song was recorded at MSR Studios and Honeywest Studios, both located in New York City. The engineers were Dana Jon Chappelle and Brian Garten, and they were assisted by Jason Finkel and Michael Leedy. "Mine Again" was mixed by Phil Tan at MSR Studios, while the song was mastered by Herb Powers at the now closed The Hit Factory in New York City. A multitude of instrumental musicians were involved with the song's production, including Chops Horns playing the horn, Darryl Dixon playing the alto saxophone, Joe Ramano playing the trumpet and flugelhorn, Jeff Dieterle playing the trombone and bass trombone, Rick Brunermer playing the tenor saxophone and flute, Randy Jackson on the bass, Poyser on the keyboards, Jeffrey Lee Johnson on the guitars and Charles Drayton on the drums.

== Composition ==
"Mine Again" is an "old-school '70s smooth soul", and neo soul ballad. The lyrics revolve around the protagonist wishing for a second chance at a seemingly failed relationship. "Mine Again" is written in the key of B-flat major and is set in common time with a moderate dance groove with 66 beats per minute (BPM). Carey's vocal range spans three octaves from the lower note of F_{4} to the higher note of F♯_{7}. The song includes piano keys and guitar strings as part of its instrumental composition. The song begins with the lyric, "I remember when you used to be mine, way back then."

== Critical reception ==
"Mine Again" garnered positive reviews from music critics. Stephen Thomas Erlewine for AllMusic wrote that "Mine Again" was "especially welcome" and "deliciously sleek" and praised Poyser's production. Todd Burns for Stylus Magazine wrote that the song was a Carey "signature show-off track." Julianne Escobedo Shepherd of Pitchfork praised her for channeling Diana Ross without ever sounding like anyone but herself." Sal Cinquemani for Slant Magazine noted that the songs which did not work well on the album were the ones where Carey performs a song in the "style of her successors", such as Usher by way of Jermaine Dupri on "Shake It Off", Twista via The Legendary Traxster on "One and Only", and The Neptunes on "To the Floor". However, Cinquemani praised Carey for "channeling a predecessor" instead of one of her successors, such as channeling Prince on "Mine Again" and "Joy Ride", describing the outcome "sublime". Cinquemani also wrote that "Mine Again", and another track from the album called "I Wish You Knew", were over sung and "would blow the 7th grade talent show competition away."

=== Accolades ===
Year	Ceremony	Award	Result	Ref(s)
2006	Grammy Awards	Best Traditional R&B Performance	Nominated	

== Credits and personnel ==
Credits adapted from the liner notes of The Emancipation of Mimi.

Recording

- Recorded at MSR Studios, New York City and Honeywest Studios, New York City.
- Mixed at Larrabee Studios in Universal City, California.
- Mastering at The Hit Factory, New York City.

Personnel

- Vocals – Mariah Carey
- Songwriting – Mariah Carey, James Poyser
- Production – Mariah Carey, James Poyser
- Engineers – Dana Jon Chappelle, Brian Garten
- Assistant engineers – Jason Finkel, Michael Leedy
- Mixing – Phil Tan
- Mastering – Herb Powers

Musicians

- Horns – Chops Horns
- Alto saxophone – Darryl Dixon
- Trumpet/Flugelhorn – Joe Ramano
- Trombone/Bass trombone – Jeff Dieterle
- Tenor saxophone/Flute – Rick Brunermer
- Bass – Randy Jackson
- Guitars – Jeffrey Lee Johnson
- Drums – Charles Drayton

== Charts ==
"Mine Again" debuted at number 82 on the US Hot R&B/Hip-Hop Songs chart on June 6, 2005. On August 13, 2005, the song charted and number 77, and fell to 89 the following week. For the week dated September 17, 2005, "Mine Again" charted at number 95. The song peaked at number 73 on October 29, 2005, and fell to number 85 the following week. It remained on the chart for a total of 14 weeks.

Chart performance for "Mine Again"
Chart (2005)	Peak position
US Hot R&B/Hip-Hop Songs (Billboard)	73
