= So Lonely (Twista song) =

Single by Twista featuring Mariah Carey

from the album The Day After
- Released: January 17, 2006
- Studio: Darkchild Studios (Pleasantville, NJ); Honeywest Studios (Los Angeles, CA)
- Genre: Hip hop; R&B
- Length: 3:51
- Label: Atlantic; Island
- Songwriters: Carl Mitchell; Mariah Carey; Rodney Jerkins; Adonis Shropshire; Makeba Riddick; LaShawn Daniels
- Producer: Rodney Jerkins

Twista singles chronology
"DJ Play a Love Song" (2006)	"So Lonely" (2006)	"Spit Your Game" (remix) (2006)

Mariah Carey singles chronology
"Don't Forget About Us" (2005)	"So Lonely" (2005)	"Fly Like a Bird" (2006)

Audio videos
- "So Lonely" on YouTube; "So Lonely" (alternative) on YouTube

"So Lonely" is a song written and produced by American singer Mariah Carey and record producer Rodney Jerkins. It is a duet between rapper Twista and Carey, featured on his album The Day After and Carey's reissue of The Emancipation of Mimi (2005), subtitled Ultra Platinum Edition. It was unofficially released in 2006 as the third single from The Day After.

The single impacted U.S. rhythmic contemporary radio on January 17, 2006. "So Lonely" reached number 14 on the Billboard Bubbling Under Hot 100 Singles chart, which represents the twenty-five singles below the Billboard Hot 100's number 100 position that have not yet appeared on the Hot 100. It failed to reach the top forty on the Pop 100 or Hot R&B/Hip-Hop Songs charts, though it appeared on the Rhythmic Airplay Chart. There was no official music video for the single.

Two versions of the song were released: the first version was released on Twista's The Day After, featuring verses from Twista, and a pre-chorus, chorus, and bridge from Carey. The second, released weeks later on Carey's The Emancipation of Mimi (Ultra Platinum Edition), adds a new verse from Carey at the beginning of the song.

== Charts ==
Chart performance for "So Lonely"
Chart (2005–2006)	Peak position
US Bubbling Under Hot 100 (Billboard)	14
US CHR/Rhythmic (Radio & Records)	48
US Hot R&B/Hip-Hop Songs (Billboard)	65
US Pop 100 (Billboard)	89
US Rhythmic Airplay (Billboard)	40
