= The Adventures of Mimi =

2006 concert tour by Mariah Carey

- Tour by Mariah Carey
- Location: Africa; Asia; North America
- Associated album: The Emancipation of Mimi
- Start date: July 22, 2006
- End date: October 28, 2006
- Legs: 3
- No. of shows: 40

Mariah Carey concert chronology
- Charmbracelet World Tour (2003–2004); The Adventures of Mimi (2006); Angels Advocate Tour (2009–2010)

The Adventures of Mimi was the sixth concert tour by American singer-songwriter Mariah Carey, in support of her tenth studio album The Emancipation of Mimi (2005) and was named after a fan's “Carey-centric” diary of the same name. The tour started on July 22, 2006, in Tunis, Tunisia and concluded on October 25, 2006, in Osaka, Japan, comprising 40 shows across Africa, Japan, and North America.

== Background ==
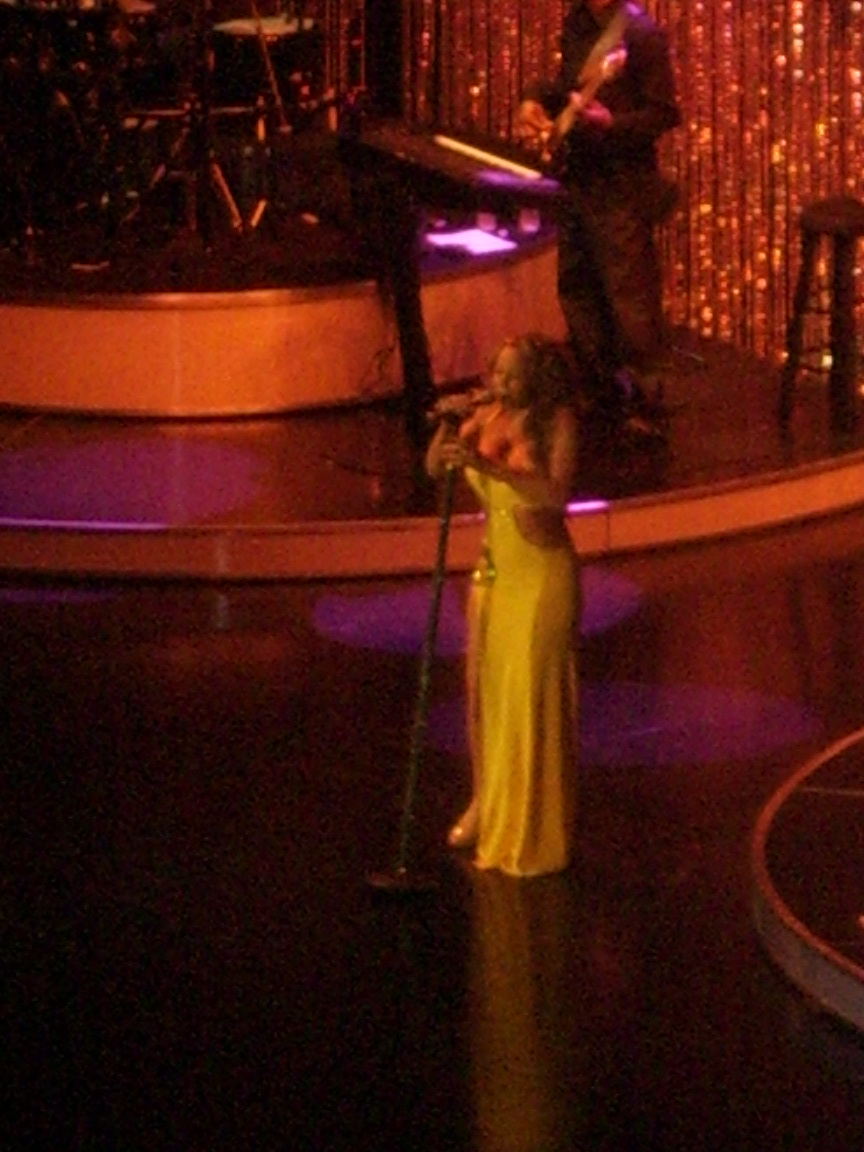
Mariah Carey performing in Tampa, Florida on August 7, 2006.

Unlike her previous tour, three years prior, Carey started this tour 16 months after the release of her latest album, the successful The Emancipation of Mimi. She had initially not wanted to tour, dreading the long travel times and not needing one to promote Mimi. But after requests from fans to appear in concert, she decided to do so to celebrate one of the best times in her career.

Similar to the past tour, Carey gave her fans the chance to submit their ideas for set lists and for the title of the tour. Her long-time musical partner and American Idol judge Randy Jackson joined her tour as the musical director, although he did not often appear at shows due to concurrent Idol auditions.

During the tour, Carey revamped her image as a performer, performing remixes of her songs, dancing along with her dancers, having guests onstage, and going into the middle of each arena onto a checkerboard B-stage to perform "Fantasy", "Always Be My Baby" and "Don't Forget About Us." (The B stage had become an increasing popular way for large-venue performers to get closer to their audience ever since U2 introduced it on their 1992 Zoo TV Tour.) The main stage was a two-level affair, with the band situated on the lower level, backed by strands of glittering material, and a staircase between the two. Carey's "MC" logo was present in several places.

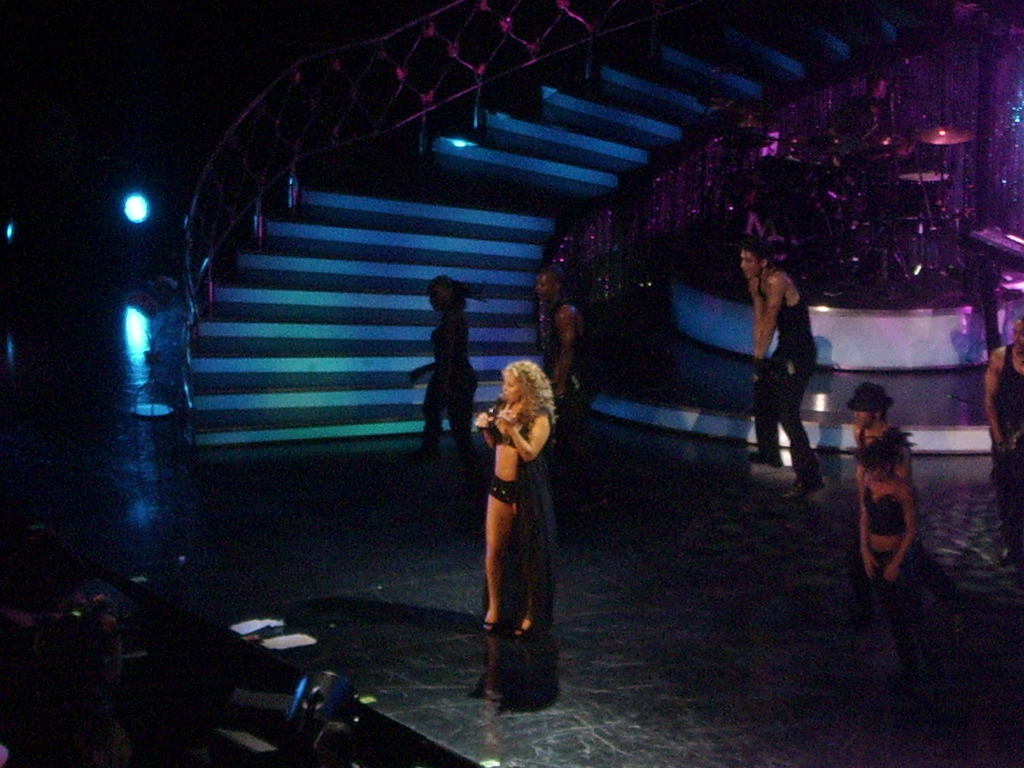
Mariah Carey performing with the first costume.

Once again, Carey invited her long-time friend and back-up singer Trey Lorenz to sing "I'll Be There" and "One Sweet Day" with her and perform several songs on his own during one of her costume changes. Except for an occasional guest appearance, raps on her songs were the pre-recorded originals, with the rapper shown on the video screens.

== Critical reception ==
Professional ratings
Review scores
Source	Rating
Blender	4/5 stars
The Detroit News	B+
Edmonton Sun	3.5/5
Fort Worth Star-Telegram	B
Las Vegas Review-Journal	B
Now	3/5
Toronto Sun	3/5
Winnipeg Free Press	3.5/5 stars

Reviews of the tour were generally positive. Most critics celebrated Carey's transformation from more of a pop star to a full-fledged hip hop/R&B artist. They also praised her vocal performances, saying that was the main attraction of the spectacle.

Some critics commented on the short length of the show, especially given that she was offstage for several breaks while undergoing costume changes, while others felt Carey was trying too hard to make the public like her, especially in terms of the "rollercoaster" metaphor she used to begin the show.

== Recordings ==
According to Carey's musical director Randy Jackson, the show at Honda Center in Anaheim on October 8, 2006, was intended as the basis for a concert filming and subsequent DVD release. Indeed, Carey held a pre-concert taping there, in order to include fans, regulate the lighting, and review other technical aspects in preparation for the night's actual concert recording.

The resulting DVD, called The Adventures of Mimi, was released over a year later, beginning in Europe on November 19, 2007, with releases in other regions of the world coming over the following two weeks.

== Set list ==
1. "Rollercoaster" (Video introduction)
2. "It's Like That" (With elements of "Sucker MC's" and "Hollis Crew" by Run-DMC)
3. "Heartbreaker" (With elements of "Desert Storm Remix")
4. "Dreamlover" (With elements of "Juicy" by The Notorious B.I.G.)
5. "My All"
6. "Shake It Off"
7. "Vision of Love"
8. "Fly Like a Bird"
9. "I'll Be There" (With Trey Lorenz)
10. "My Everything" (Performed by Trey Lorenz)
11. "Fantasy" (Bad Boy Remix)
12. "Don't Forget About Us"
13. "Always Be My Baby"
14. "Honey" (With elements of "Bad Boy Remix")
15. "I Wish You Knew" (Snippet)
16. "Thank God I Found You" (Make It Last Remix) [With Trey Lorenz]
17. "One Sweet Day" (With Trey Lorenz)
18. "Hero"
19. "We Belong Together"
20. "Fly Away (Butterfly Reprise)" (Outro)

=== Notes ===
- "Breakdown" was performed in Tunis and Miami.
- "I Know What You Want" was performed in Tunis, Miami and Tampa.
- "I Wish You Knew" was not performed in Tunis.
- "Make It Happen" was performed in Tunis, Miami, Tampa, Atlanta, Philadelphia, Toronto, Montreal, on the first Atlantic City show, Boston, New York City, East Rutherford, Calgary, and Anaheim.
- "Without You" was performed in Tunis.
- "Vision of Love" was replaced by "Stay the Night" in Miami, Tampa, Atlanta, Uncasville, Albany, Verona, Tokyo, Nagoya and on the first Saitama show.
- "Your Girl" was performed in Miami, Atlanta, Albany, Wantagh and Verona.
- A snippet of "Can't Let Go" was performed in Tampa, Atlanta, Philadelphia, Toronto, Montreal, on the first Atlantic City show, Boston, New York City, East Rutherford, Washington DC, Auburn Hills, Houston, Dallas, Winnipeg, Edmonton, Las Vegas, Oakland, Los Angeles, Anaheim and Phoenix.
- A snippet of "Joy Ride" was performed in Tampa.
- "One Sweet Day" was not performed in Tampa, on the second Atlantic City show, Verona, Tokyo, Nagoya, Saitama and Osaka.
- "Thank God I Found You" was not performed in Atlanta, on the second Atlantic City show, Uncasville, Albany, Verona, Washington DC, Calgary, Sacramento, Anaheim and during the Asian leg.
- A snippet of "Close My Eyes" was performed in Toronto, Montreal and Wantagh.
- JAY Z joined Carey on stage for the performance of "Heartbreaker" in New York City.
- Diddy joined Carey on stage for the performance of "Honey" in New York City.
- "Let Me Love You" was performed by Mario in East Rutherford.
- Mario joined Carey on stage for the performance of "One Sweet Day" in East Rutherford.
- "Fantasy" was not performed in Wantagh.
- "Fly Like a Bird" was not performed in Verona, Tokyo, Nagoya, on the first Saitama show and Osaka.
- A snippet of "Melt Away" was performed in Auburn Hills.
- A snippet of "Love Takes Time" was performed in Winnipeg.
- A snippet of "My Saving Grace" was performed in San Diego.
- Da Brat joined Carey on stage for the performance of "Heartbreaker" in Atlanta, New York City, Chicago, and Los Angeles.
- "All I Want for Christmas Is You" was performed during the Asian leg.
- "My All" was not performed at Uncasville or at the first Saitama show.

== Shows ==
List of concerts, showing date, city, country, venue, tickets sold, amount of available tickets and gross revenue
Date (2006)	City	Country	Venue	Opening act	Attendance	Revenue
July 22	Tunis	Tunisia	Stade El Menzah	—N/a	42,525 / 42,525	$5,626,738
July 24	Tunis	Tunisia	Stade El Menzah	—N/a	42,525 / 42,525	$5,626,738
August 5	Miami	United States	American Airlines Arena	—N/a	13,156 / 13,156	$1,074,620
August 7	Tampa	United States	St. Pete Times Forum	—N/a	13,354 / 13,542	$714,455
August 9	Atlanta	United States	Philips Arena	—N/a	11,226 / 13,288	$660,595
August 11	Philadelphia	United States	Wachovia Center	Sean Paul	15,160 / 15,160	$979,702
August 13	Toronto	Canada	Air Canada Centre	Sean Paul	27,064 / 27,064	$2,039,161
August 15	Montreal	Canada	Bell Centre	Sean Paul	13,200 / 14,161	$1,046,560
August 17	Atlantic City	United States	Trump Taj	—N/a	10,000 / 10,000	$1,796,606
August 19	Atlantic City	United States	Trump Taj	—N/a	10,000 / 10,000	$1,796,606
August 21	Boston	United States	TD Banknorth Garden	Sean Paul	11,993 / 14,922	$1,034,794
August 23	New York City	United States	Madison Square Garden	Sean Paul	13,930 / 13,930	$1,300,140
August 25	Uncasville	United States	Mohegan Sun Arena	—N/a	5,375 / 5,375	$713,425
August 27	East Rutherford	United States	Continental Airlines Arena	Sean Paul	12,697 / 13,525	$1,076,790
August 29	Toronto	Canada	Air Canada Centre	Sean Paul	(Note: The score data is representative of the both shows at the Air Canada Centre on August 13 and August 29, respectively.)	
September 1	Albany	United States	Pepsi Arena	—N/a	6,519 / 6,519	$449,248
September 3	Wantagh	United States	Nikon at Jones Beach Theater	Sean Paul	11,725 / 13,855	$654,534
September 5	Verona	United States	Turning Stone Resort & Casino	—N/a	3,027 / 5,000	$379,801
September 7	Washington, D.C.	United States	Verizon Center	Sean Paul	12,121 / 14,199	$839,643
September 9	Auburn Hills	United States	The Palace of Auburn Hills	Sean Paul	12,804 / 12,804	$894,399
September 11	Chicago	United States	United Center	Sean Paul	12,958 / 13,930	$919,268
September 14	Houston	United States	Toyota Center	—N/a	11,252 / 11,830	$828,293
September 16	Dallas	United States	American Airlines Center	—N/a	10,521 / 11,494	$806,096
September 19	Winnipeg	Canada	MTS Centre	—N/a	8,915 / 9,557	$611,223
September 21	Edmonton	Canada	Rexall Place	—N/a	12,013 / 12,578	$880,306
September 23	Vancouver	Canada	General Motors Place	—N/a	14,189 / 14,652	$1,223,100
September 25	Calgary	Canada	Pengrowth Saddledome	—N/a	11,984 / 11,984	$815,242
September 27	Sacramento	United States	ARCO Arena	—N/a	12,353 / 12,510	$938,106
September 30	Las Vegas	United States	MGM Grand Garden Arena	—N/a	13,730 / 13,730	$1,844,530
October 2	Oakland	United States	Oracle Arena	—N/a	12,510 / 13,585	$960,369
October 4	San Diego	United States	San Diego Sports Arena	Ne-Yo	9,480 / 10,000	$765,431
October 6	Los Angeles	United States	Staples Center	—N/a	12,844 / 13,882	$1,230,397
October 8	Anaheim	United States	Honda Center	—N/a	11,475 / 12,024	$918,283
October 10	Phoenix	United States	US Airways Center	—N/a	12,049 / 13,136	$880,739
October 16	Tokyo	Japan	Nippon Budokan	—N/a	13,509 / 13,509	$1,853,702
October 18	Nagoya	Japan	Nagoya Rainbow Hall	—N/a	9,853 / 9,853	$1,425,184
October 20	Saitama	Japan	Saitama Super Arena	—N/a	70,454 / 70,454	$11,345,193
October 21	Saitama	Japan	Saitama Super Arena	—N/a	70,454 / 70,454	$11,345,193
October 24	Osaka	Japan	Osaka-jō Hall	—N/a	13,105 / 13,105	$1,965,010
October 25	Osaka	Japan	Osaka-jō Hall	—N/a	13,105 / 13,105	$1,965,010
Total					509,070 / 530,838 (96%)	$51,491,683

Additional Notes

- Carey never schedules shows in two consecutive nights, as she "actually [has] to have a full day and a half off between shows, whereas most touring artists do it every night", and she spends her down time preserving her voice by not talking and "sitting in a humidified room, sleeping."
- Carey performed a show at the Kodak Theatre in Los Angeles on July 29 as part of the Pepsi Smash concert series. These tickets were not available to the public. Only winners selected through an online contest. The show featured the same stage setting but a shortened setlist with some different costumes.

== Cancelled shows ==
List of cancelled concerts, showing date, city, country, venue and reason for cancellation
Date (2006)	City	Country	Venue	Reason
August 29	New York City	United States	Madison Square Garden	Unknown
September 3	Hershey	United States	Giant Center	Unknown
September 18	Denver	United States	Pepsi Center	Unknown
September 25	Seattle	United States	KeyArena	Unknown
October 28	Hong Kong		Tamar site	Promotion Conflicts

== Personnel ==
=== Main ===
- Manager — Mariah Carey & Benny Medina
- Co-Manager — Mark Sudack
- Tour Manager — Michael Richardson
- Show Director — Barry Lather
- Musical Director — Randy Jackson
- Tour Executive — Michael Richardson
- Handprint Entertainment — Melissa Ruderman
- Maroon Entertainment — Gina Rainville
- Lighting/Set Design — Justin Collie/Art Fag
- Sound Design — Mike McKnight
- Sound Engineer — Howard Page
- Video Director — Chris Keating
- Backline Tech — Shawn Atkins Drums & Bass guitar/Key Bass
- Vignettes — Directed by Spike Lee
- Frefall Intro — Bill Boatman & Michael Shores
- Security: Darrel Clark and Rob Payne
- Make-Up & Hair — Paul Starr and Lew Ablahani
- Costume Designer — June Ambrose
- Dressmaker — Cmylo
- Personal Assistant — Lisa Ripi
- Personal Trainer — Patricia Gay
- Choreography — Rachel McIntosh, Eddie Morales, Anthony Talauega, Richmond Talauega, and AJ Jones
- Dancers — Rachel McIntosh, Eddie Morales, Earl Wright, Joshuah Michael, Michelle Brooke, Bryan Tanaka, Russel Wright, Rafael Mello Alvim, and Myles Anthony Urquhart

=== Band ===
- Keyboards — Eric Daniels and Lamonte Neuble
- Drums — Jerohn Garnett
- Bass & Keyboards — James Butler
- Background vocalists — Trey Lorenz, MaryAnn Tatum and Sherry Tatum
- Choir – Greater Los Angeles Cathedral Choir
