= The Emancipation of Mimi =

2005 studio album by Mariah Carey

- Standard edition cover

Studio album by Mariah Carey
- Released: March 30, 2005
- Recorded: 2004
- Studios: Right Track (New York City); SouthSide (Atlanta); Honeywest (New York City); Record Plant (Hollywood); Marsha and Jan (Los Angeles); Capri (Capri); CRC (Chicago); Darkchild (Pleasantville)
- Genres: R&B; pop; dance-pop
- Length: 50:10
- Label: Island
- Producers: Mariah Carey; Jermaine Dupri; Manuel Seal, Jr.; Bryan-Michael Cox; Swizz Beatz; LRoc; James "Big Jim" Wright; The Neptunes; Kanye West; James Poyser; Rodney "Darkchild" Jerkins

Mariah Carey chronology
| The Remixes (2003) | The Emancipation of Mimi (2005) | E=MC² (2008) |

Singles from The Emancipation of Mimi
- 1. "It's Like That" Released: January 25, 2005; 2. "We Belong Together" Released: March 15, 2005; 3. "Shake It Off" Released: July 11, 2005; 4. "Get Your Number" Released: October 3, 2005; 5. "Fly Like a Bird" Released: March 13, 2006; 6. "Say Somethin'" Released: April 3, 2006

Singles from The Emancipation of Mimi: Ultra Platinum Edition
- 1. "Don't Forget About Us" Released: October 10, 2005

The Emancipation of Mimi is the tenth studio album by American singer-songwriter Mariah Carey. It was released on March 30, 2005, by Island Records. Its widespread success—which followed the critical and commercial disappointments of her albums Glitter (2001) and Charmbracelet (2002)—led many to deem it Carey's comeback album.

Carey worked on The Emancipation of Mimi throughout 2004 with a variety of songwriters and producers, including Jermaine Dupri, Snoop Dogg, Kanye West, Twista, Nelly, Pharrell Williams, and James "Big Jim" Wright; some appear as featured artists on select tracks. Carey adopted her personal nickname "Mimi" in the title, revealing a more intimate side of the singer in line with the album's overarching theme of emancipation from personal and commercial setbacks. Its songs concern themes of liberation, love, and personal growth. The Emancipation of Mimi is primarily an R&B, pop, and dance-pop album, with influences of hip-hop, gospel, and soul.

Carey promoted the album with the Adventures of Mimi Tour in 2006. The album spawned six singles, led by "It's Like That", which attained top-ten peaks worldwide. "We Belong Together" spent fourteen weeks at number one on the US Billboard Hot 100, blocking the album's third single, "Shake It Off", from the top spot. This marked the first time a female artist monopolized the chart's top two positions. The deluxe edition's single "Don't Forget About Us" also topped the Billboard Hot 100. The Emancipation of Mimi topped the US Billboard 200 and was the country's best-selling album of 2005. It was the year's second best-selling album worldwide, and has since sold over 10 million copies.

The Emancipation of Mimi received generally positive reviews; critics viewed it as a return to form for Carey and praised its production and her vocal performance. The album and its songs were nominated for ten awards across the 48th (2006) and 49th Annual Grammy Awards (2007), winning three, including Best Contemporary R&B Album. It is credited with reviving Carey's career and reshaping the idea of a comeback in popular music. In retrospect, critics have regarded it as one of her strongest works and have praised its embrace of her R&B sensibilities and diva persona; Rolling Stone included it on its "500 Greatest Albums of All Time" list.

== Background and title ==
American singer-songwriter Mariah Carey's life and career began to decline following the poor critical and commercial reception to her romantic musical drama film Glitter (2001), her major screen debut. The film, on a $22 million budget, grossed over $5 million in revenue—making it a box-office bomb—and was universally panned by critics. After posting a deeply personal letter on her official website, Carey was admitted to a hospital in Connecticut due to an "emotional and physical breakdown". The critical and commercial failure of Glitter's accompanying soundtrack—her eighth studio album—prompted Virgin Records America to buy out Carey's $100 million recording contract, paying her $28 million to part ways.

Following a two-week hospitalization, Carey flew to Capri, Italy. She spent five months there, during which she wrote what she described as her "most personal album". After signing to Island Records and starting her own imprint, MonarC Entertainment, she released her intended "comeback" album, Charmbracelet, on December 3, 2002. CBC News said that while it was an improvement over Glitter, it would not re-establish the popularity she enjoyed earlier in her career. After enduring three years of critical setbacks, Carey attempted a comeback once again with her tenth studio album, titled The Emancipation of Mimi. She announced the name of the album on November 18, 2004, via her website.

After learning that close friends referred to her as "Mimi", Island Records executive L.A. Reid told Carey that he felt her "spirit on this record" and suggested that she should use the name in the title, as "that's the fun side of [Carey] that people don't get to see – the side that can laugh at the diva jokes, laugh at the breakdown jokes, laugh at whatever they want to say about [her] and just live life and enjoy it". Carey stated that Mimi is a "very personal nickname" only used by those in her inner circle, and thus the title meant she was "letting [her] guard down" and inviting her fans to be much closer to her. She thought that titling the album The Emancipation of Mariah Carey would be "obnoxious".

== Writing and recording ==
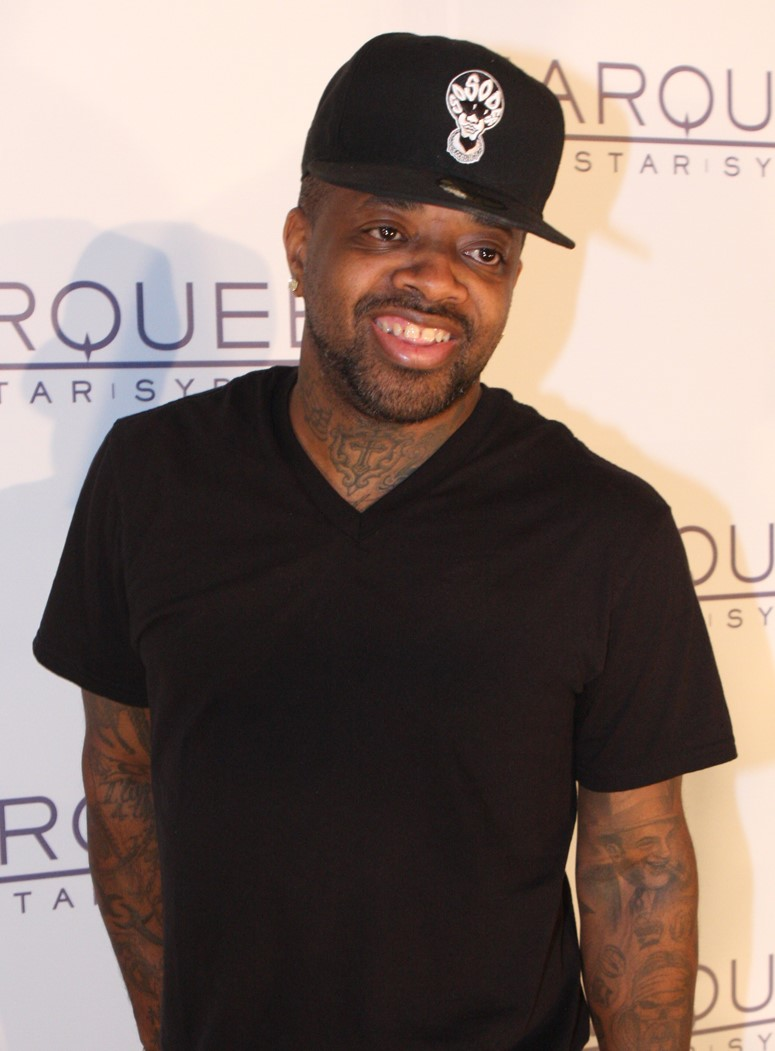
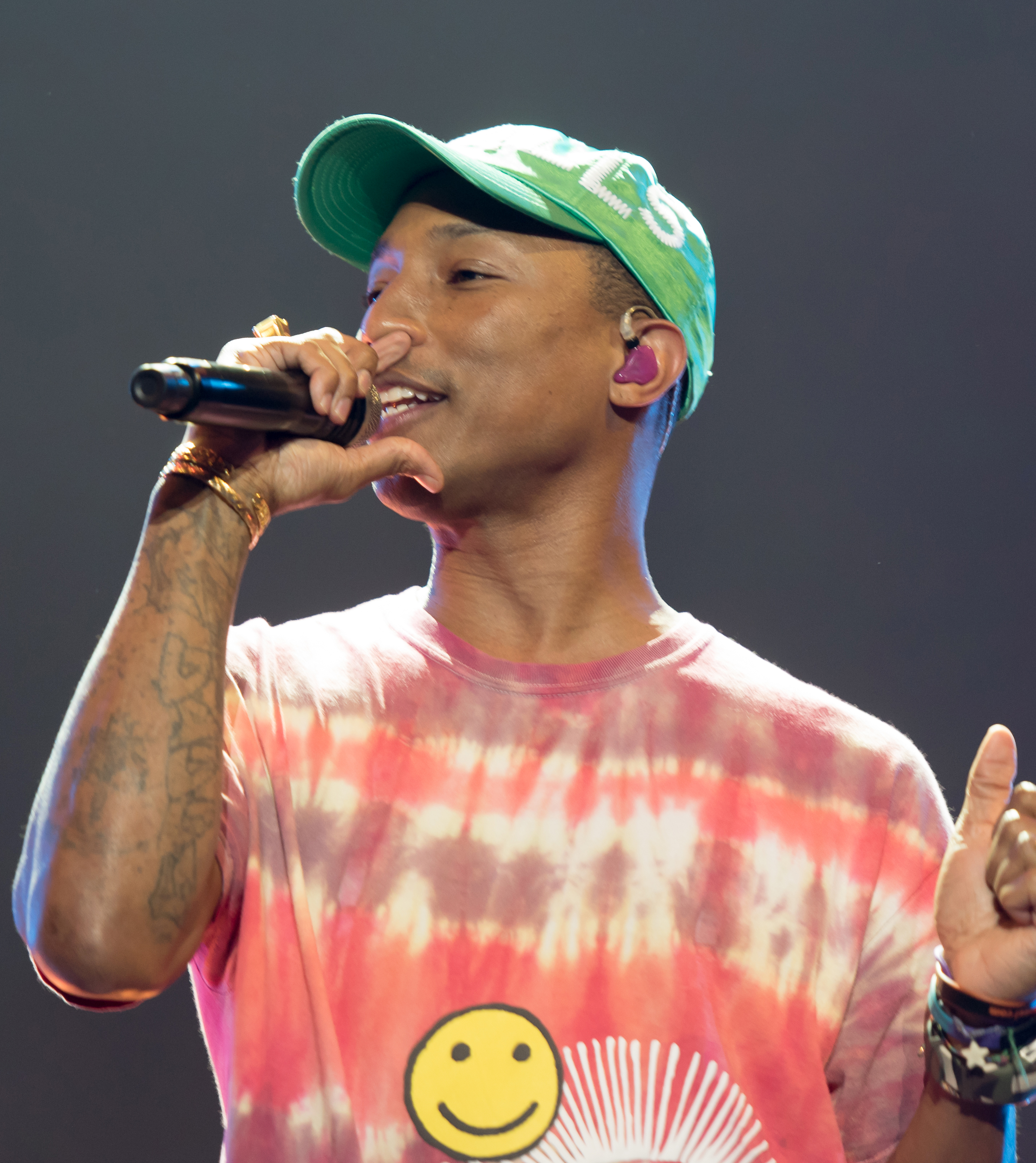
Carey worked with a range of producers and writers when composing the album, including Jermaine Dupri (left) and the Neptunes (member Pharrell Williams pictured; right).

During a visit to a recording studio, Carey was given a beat by the Legendary Traxster. Later, she met American rapper Twista backstage after a show. When Carey mentioned the track, Twista told her that the beat had been intended for him, and that he had already written lyrics for it. They decided to collaborate on the track and titled it "One and Only". Within this time, Carey co-wrote and co-produced several tracks for The Emancipation of Mimi, including "Say Somethin'" with Snoop Dogg and the Neptunes, "To the Floor" with Nelly, and "Fly Like a Bird" with James "Big Jim" Wright.

By November 2004, Carey felt that she had composed enough material for The Emancipation of Mimi. Reid suggested that the singer compose some more "strong" singles to ensure that the album was commercially successful. Carey met with Jermaine Dupri in Atlanta for a brief studio session, as Reid believed she had produced some of her best material in collaboration with him. Within two days, the two recorded "Shake It Off" and "Get Your Number". "Shake It Off" was initially selected as the lead single, replacing contenders "Stay the Night" and "Say Somethin'". Carey returned to Atlanta for a second meeting, during which they composed "It's Like That" and "We Belong Together".

In an interview with Billboard, Carey talked about the creation of "It's Like That", recalling that she had a "great feeling about it" by the time she had finished writing it. Following its completion, Carey and her management chose to release the track as the album's lead single, describing it as the best choice to introduce the project. She later praised Dupri for being "focused" and said that their collaboration had resulted in some of her favorite songs on the album. Carey told MTV that she approached the album not with the intent of satisfying industry expectations for emotional ballads or addressing media narratives about her life, but rather by keeping the production minimal and inspired by the simplicity of 1970s soul music. According to Reid, she aimed for the record to have a less polished sound than her earlier releases.

Carey had greater creative freedom when making The Emancipation of Mimi. Frustrated with what she described as unnecessary "bells and whistles" on previous albums, she chose to record most of the album live with her band. Dupri has said he encouraged Carey to reclaim her signature full vocal style throughout The Emancipation of Mimi, moving away from the softer, whispering tone she had used on previous albums.

== Composition ==
Sal Cinquemani of Slant Magazine wrote that the album can be split into two distinct parts: "half of it catering to her misguided yet genuine passion for hip-hop and the other half attempting to recapture her more soul-oriented beginnings". The Emancipation of Mimi is primarily an R&B, pop, and dance-pop album, though less pop-oriented than Carey's 1990s work. It spans multiple genres; Chicago Tribune critic Greg Kot called it a blend of hip-hop and contemporary R&B into broadly appealing pop songs. Billboard opined that the album is steeped in hip-hop and old-school R&B ballads, while MTV News's Alyssa Rashbaum labeled it a pop–R&B effort laced with hip-hop influences. AllMusic's Stephen Thomas Erlewine described The Emancipation of Mimi as "a slick, highly crafted piece of dance-pop".

"It's Like That"
This clip features the hand claps and whistles used throughout the song. It illustrates the strong bassline, aligned with piano and string notes. Dupri's ad-libs are heard toward the end of the sample, followed by Scoop's closing verse.

"We Belong Together"
A sample of the final chorus of "We Belong Together". The sample highlights Carey's acclaimed vocal performance throughout the climax, as well as the instrumentation derived from finger-snaps, kick drums, and a strong piano-driven melody.

Written and produced by Carey and Dupri, the opening track "It's Like That" features hand claps, whistles, and ad-libs, as well as verses from Dupri and Fat Man Scoop. Its bassline follows the same chord progression as the piano and strings. Lyrically, the song focuses on moving past one's history, rejecting "stress" and "fights", and ignoring drama. "We Belong Together", built upon finger-snaps, kick drums, and a piano-driven melody, chronicles a woman's desperation for her former lover to return. The third track, "Shake It Off", features a more funk-oriented production and is about moving on from a relationship with an unfaithful lover.

"Mine Again"—which Carey wrote alongside producer James Poyser—finds her wishing for a second chance at a seemingly failed relationship. The ballad has electronic keyboard notes, a rhythmic vinyl sound, and melodies from gospel and R&B genres. The singer wrote the album's fifth track "Say Somethin'", featuring Snoop Dogg's rap verses and production by the Neptunes. Vibe called it "a musical oddity" with "strange instrumentation, weird melodic shifts, hectic drum patterns and a bed of synths". Pitchfork's Julianne Escobedo Shepherd wrote that on the track, Carey "bats her eyes and flirts with a coy low register".

"Stay the Night" was produced by Carey and Kanye West, sampling a piano loop from Ramsey Lewis's 1971 cover of "Betcha by Golly, Wow". Lyrically, the protagonist grapples with the temptation to spend the night with an ex-lover despite his current relationship. "Get Your Number" samples the hook from British band Imagination's single "Just an Illusion" (1982), drawing its production from 1980s-style synthesizers and computerized instruments. "One and Only" features Twista and incorporates hip-hop influences, with The New York Times's Jon Pareles stating that Carey adopts the rapid, double-time vocal phrasing associated with Destiny's Child in an attempt to stay contemporary. "Circles" was written by Carey and Wright as a 1970s soul-inspired ballad depicting her questioning a recent heartbreak. Co-written with Scram Jones, "Your Girl" is the shortest track on the album, while its lyrics are about confidently approaching a potential lover, which Carey conveys via belting.

"I Wish You Knew" is a soul ballad with a spoken-word bridge. The twelfth track, "To the Floor", is an atmospheric and percussive song that features a guest appearance from Nelly. Glenn Rowley of Billboard deemed it radio-friendly enough for single release and noted the chemistry between Carey and Nelly, who repeatedly declare, "Whatever happens, it's goin' down tonight". "Joy Ride" is a ballad about enduring love and the comfort of a soulmate's embrace, with Carey repeatedly affirming "we found love". The album closes with "Fly Like a Bird", a gospel-influenced ballad that the singer co-wrote with Wright. Its lyrics form a prayer expressing unconditional love for God. The track features a spoken recording of Carey's pastor, Clarence Keaton, reciting two Bible verses.

== Release and promotion ==
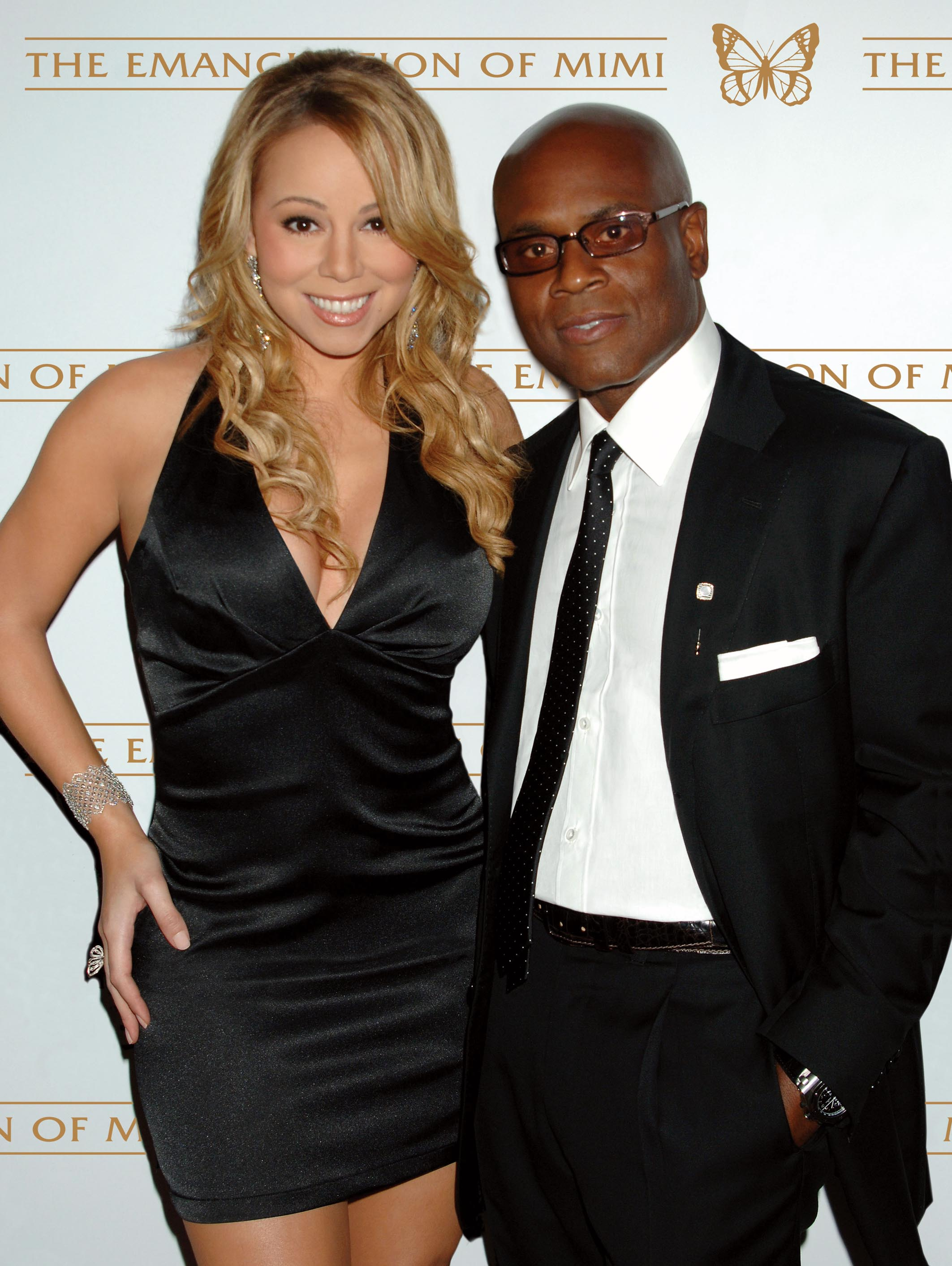
Carey, pictured with former Island Records head L.A. Reid in 2005, at the release party for The Emancipation of Mimi

The Emancipation of Mimi was initially scheduled to be released on March 22, 2005. It was released in Japan on March 30, elsewhere on April 4, and in the United States eight days later. A reissue subtitled Ultra Platinum Edition launched on November 15, 2005, led by the single "Don't Forget About Us". It came in two formats: a CD with a few bonus tracks—"Don't Forget About Us", "Makin' It Last All Night (What It Do)", "Sprung", "Secret Love", a "We Belong Together" remix, and Twista's "So Lonely", adding Carey's new verse. The other format was a limited CD or DVD set with videos for "It's Like That", "We Belong Together", "Shake It Off", "Get Your Number", and "Don't Forget About Us".

Carey began promoting the album at a promotional event in Tokyo on March 31, 2005, where she performed "It's Like That". In April, she performed at Germany's Echo Awards and later on the game show Wetten, dass..?. Throughout 2005, Carey performed four Emancipation of Mimi songs on Top of the Pops: "It's Like That" (March 25 and April 10), "We Belong Together" (July 1), "Get Your Number" (September 18), and "Shake It Off" (October 9). After its release in the US, Carey appeared on Good Morning America with an interview and an outdoor concert in Times Square, which drew the plaza's largest crowd since New Year's Eve 2004 and included songs from The Emancipation of Mimi. The following week she performed "We Belong Together" at the BET Awards 2005 and appeared on the live VH1 Save the Music special on April 17.

In May 2005, she appeared and performed on talk shows such as Late Show with David Letterman, The Tonight Show with Jay Leno, and The Ellen DeGeneres Show. Carey performed "Shake It Off" and the remix of "We Belong Together" with Jermaine Dupri at the 2005 MTV Video Music Awards at the National Hotel in South Beach. On November 15, she sang "Shake It Off" and "Don't Forget About Us" at halftime of the Thanksgiving game between the Detroit Lions and Atlanta Falcons. She opened the 33rd American Music Awards in November with "Don't Forget About Us" and, at the 48th Annual Grammy Awards, performed at the Grammy Awards for the first time in ten years. Carey opened with a video on faith, then performed shortened versions of "We Belong Together" and "Fly Like a Bird", earning the night's only standing ovation and praise from critics.

In 2025, for the album's twentieth anniversary, Carey released a deluxe anniversary edition of the album on May 30, 2025. The edition was announced alongside various LP vinyl box sets, preceded by a remix of "Don't Forget About Us" with Kaytranada.

=== Singles ===
Island Records and MonarC Entertainment released "It's Like That" as the lead single from The Emancipation of Mimi on January 25, 2005. Critics predicted that the song would re-ignite Carey's popularity among MTV viewers. The song peaked at number sixteen on the US Billboard Hot 100. It fared better elsewhere, peaking within the top ten of charts in Australia, Hungary, Italy, Scotland, and the UK. "We Belong Together" was released as the second single from the album on March 15. In the US, it became Carey's sixteenth number-one on the Billboard Hot 100, topping the chart for fourteen nonconsecutive weeks. It was ranked by Billboard as the most successful song of the 2000s. Elsewhere, it topped charts in Australia and the Netherlands, and attained a top-five peak in New Zealand, Denmark, Spain, Switzerland, and the UK.

The third single from the album, "Shake It Off" was released on July 11, 2005. When it climbed to its peak of number two in the US, the song was blocked from reaching number one by the album's previous single, "We Belong Together". With this feat, she became the first woman to occupy the top two positions of the Billboard Hot 100, and the sixth person overall. In the UK, "Shake It Off" was released as a double A-side along with "Get Your Number". These singles debuted at number nine on the UK Singles Chart. "Don't Forget About Us" was issued as the first single from the Ultra Platinum Edition and the fourth overall single from The Emancipation of Mimi. The track became Carey's seventeenth number-one on the Billboard Hot 100, tying her with Elvis Presley for the most chart-toppers by a solo artist, a record she later surpassed in 2008 with "Touch My Body".

In the US, "Fly Like a Bird" and "Say Somethin'" were released on March 13 and April 3, 2006, respectively, the former to urban radio and gospel stations, and the latter to mainstream contemporary hit radio. "Say Somethin'" peaked at number 79 on the Billboard Hot 100 and reached the top 40 in Australia, Ireland, Italy, and the United Kingdom.

=== Touring ===
With this tour, I'm going to be working on some different arrangements for some of the older songs, to [...] give it a little more life to them. [...] I love re-singing songs to different music. I genuinely want to tour with these new songs, as well as older hits. These new songs mean so much to me, this time of my life has been so wonderful for me, and I want to experience that with my fans.

— Carey in an interview for the Associated Press

In March 2006—sixteen months after the album's release—Carey announced the Adventures of Mimi, her first headlining tour in three years. The Adventures of Mimi Tour ran from July 22 to October 28, 2006, across 40 dates: 32 in the US and Canada, two in Tunisia, and six in Japan. Longtime friend Randy Jackson featured as the musical director. The tour earned mixed reviews, with critics praising Carey's vocals but criticizing excesses like frequent costume changes as distracting.

In Tunis, she performed to about 60,000 across two concerts. Midway through, she scheduled two Hong Kong dates after Japan, but they were cancelled after tickets had been sold; manager Benny Medina blamed the promoter's refusal of agreed compensation, while the promoter cited low sales of 4,000 tickets, a figure Medina disputed as 8,000 sold, insisting Carey would have performed regardless. Carey sued the promoter for $1 million in damages over the abrupt cancellation.

== Critical reception ==
Professional ratings
Aggregate scores
| Source | Rating |
|---|---|
| Metacritic | 64/100 |
Review scores
| Source | Rating |
| Blender | 4/5 stars |
| Entertainment Weekly | B |
| The Guardian | 4/5 stars |
| Los Angeles Times | 2/4 stars |
| Rolling Stone | 2.5/5 stars |
| USA Today | 3.5/4 stars |
| Vibe | 4/5 |

On release, The Emancipation of Mimi garnered generally positive reviews from music critics. At Metacritic, which assigns a normalized rating out of 100 to reviews from mainstream critics, it received an average score of 64, based on 16 reviews.

Positive reviews largely praised the album's sound and Carey's vocal performance. Billboard's Michael Paoletta commended its "strong lyrics and slick production", stating that despite some vocal decline, Carey's "still-considerable pipes" remained evident. Tom Sinclair, writing for Entertainment Weekly, highlighted how nearly every track "showcases Carey's undeniable vocal strengths". Critics also responded favorably to its contemporary direction: Pareles lauded its "fresh and innovative" approach and The Guardian's Caroline Sullivan called it "cool, focused and urban". USA Today writer Elysa Gardner praised its fusion of hip-hop sensibilities with a renewed embrace of classic soul music, and Dimitri Ehrlich for Vibe liked its eclectic fusion of 1980s influences and contemporary hip-hop.

Some critics portrayed The Emancipation of Mimi as a significant moment in Carey's career; many critics converged on its role as a comeback or reinvention. Andre Meyer, in a review for CBS News, regarded the material as stronger than that of Charmbracelet and noted its "jittery R&B vibe" similar to that of Destiny's Child, suggesting it aligned with Carey's broader return to pop prominence. Blender's Jody Rosen viewed the album as a reinvention for Carey and praised her more restrained and subtle vocal approach. Jenson Macey from BBC News wrote that it returned her "straight back to the top of the A-List", while Stephen Thomas Erlewine deemed it a "relative comeback" for Carey. Meanwhile, Jennifer Vineyard, writing for MTV News, observed that the album's title and concept may have been influenced by Janet Jackson's Damita Jo (2004), which similarly drew on an alternate persona.

Less positive reviews criticized the production and songwriting. Jozen Cummings of PopMatters found portions of the record corny and overproduced, and Sal Cinquemani from Slant Magazine felt that Carey's singing on ballads like "Mine Again" and "I Wish You Knew" was histrionic. Some were less convinced by its originality. Barry Walters of Rolling Stone lamented its lack of memorable songwriting and hooks, and Natalie Nichols, in the Los Angeles Times, argued that it relied too heavily on standard contemporary R&B formulas and that while it was a "personal and liberating comeback", it failed to fully revitalize Carey's career.

== Commercial performance ==
In the US, The Emancipation of Mimi opened atop the Billboard 200, selling 404,000 copies in its first week and replacing 50 Cent's The Massacre at the top spot. Its first-week sales were the highest of Carey's career, until her next album, E=MC² (2008), opened with 463,000. In its second week, the album fell to number two, selling 226,000 units. The album returned to number one in its eighth week, selling 172,000 copies. It stayed in the top ten for months before dropping to number eleven on September 28, 2005. The release of the Ultra Platinum Edition helped the album return to number four, with 185,000 units sold. In the US, The Emancipation of Mimi sold 4.97 million by the end of the year, making it the best-selling album of 2005. It marked the first time since singer-songwriter Alanis Morissette's Jagged Little Pill (1996) that a solo female artist's album was the year's bestseller. The album was certified seven-times platinum by the Recording Industry Association of America in 2022.

The Emancipation of Mimi debuted at number thirteen on the Australian Albums Chart on April 17, 2005, later peaking at number six and charting for forty-six weeks total. It earned a platinum certification from the Australian Recording Industry Association, indicating 70,000 units shipped. In Canada it debuted and peaked at number two on the Canadian Albums Chart with 11,000 copies sold, and was later certified triple platinum by the Canadian Recording Industry Association for shipments of 300,000 units. The album entered the UK Albums Chart at number seven, re-peaked there fourteen weeks later, spent fifty weeks total, and was certified double platinum by the British Phonographic Industry—indicating 600,000 units shipped. Over 621,000 copies had been sold by May 2008. In France, The Emancipation of Mimi debuted at number four and earned a gold certification from the Syndicat National de l'Édition Phonographique for 100,000 units shipped. Eight months post-Europe release, the International Federation of the Phonographic Industry (IFPI) certified it platinum for one million units shipped continent-wide.

In Hong Kong, The Emancipation of Mimi received a Gold Disc Award as one of the year's ten best-selling foreign albums. It debuted at number two on the Japanese Albums Chart, earning platinum certification—denoting 250,000 units shipped—from the Recording Industry Association of Japan. By the end of 2005, the IFPI reported that 7.7 million units of The Emancipation of Mimi had been sold globally, ranking it as the second best-selling album of the year behind Coldplay's X&Y, and the best-selling by a female artist. Estimated sales range from 10 to 12 million copies worldwide, ranking it among the best-selling albums of the 21st century.

== Accolades ==
The Emancipation of Mimi received numerous awards, including ten Grammy Award nominations across 2006–07: eight in 2006 for the original release (Carey's single-year record) and two in 2007 for the Ultra Platinum Edition. At the 48th Annual Grammy Awards in 2006, it won Best Contemporary R&B Album, with "We Belong Together" taking Best Female R&B Vocal Performance and Best R&B Song. Nominations included Album of the Year (The Emancipation of Mimi), Record of the Year and Song of the Year ("We Belong Together"), Best Female Pop Vocal Performance ("It's Like That"), and Best Traditional R&B Vocal Performance ("Mine Again"). In 2007, "Don't Forget About Us" earned nods for Best Female R&B Vocal Performance and Best R&B Song.

At the 2005 Soul Train Music Awards, The Emancipation of Mimi won for Best R&B/Soul Album – Female, while "We Belong Together" won Best R&B/Soul Single – Female; it also earned the 2005 Vibe Award for Album of the Year. Rolling Stone ranked the album at number forty-three on its 2005 list of the year's best albums, and Entertainment Weekly ranked it at number twenty-one on their list of the "Top 100 Best Albums of the Past 25 years" (2008). "We Belong Together" won a Teen Choice Award, a World Music Award, five Billboard Music Awards, four Radio Music Awards, and three Bambi Awards. "Shake It Off" and "Don't Forget About Us" won two additional Bambis.

== Legacy ==
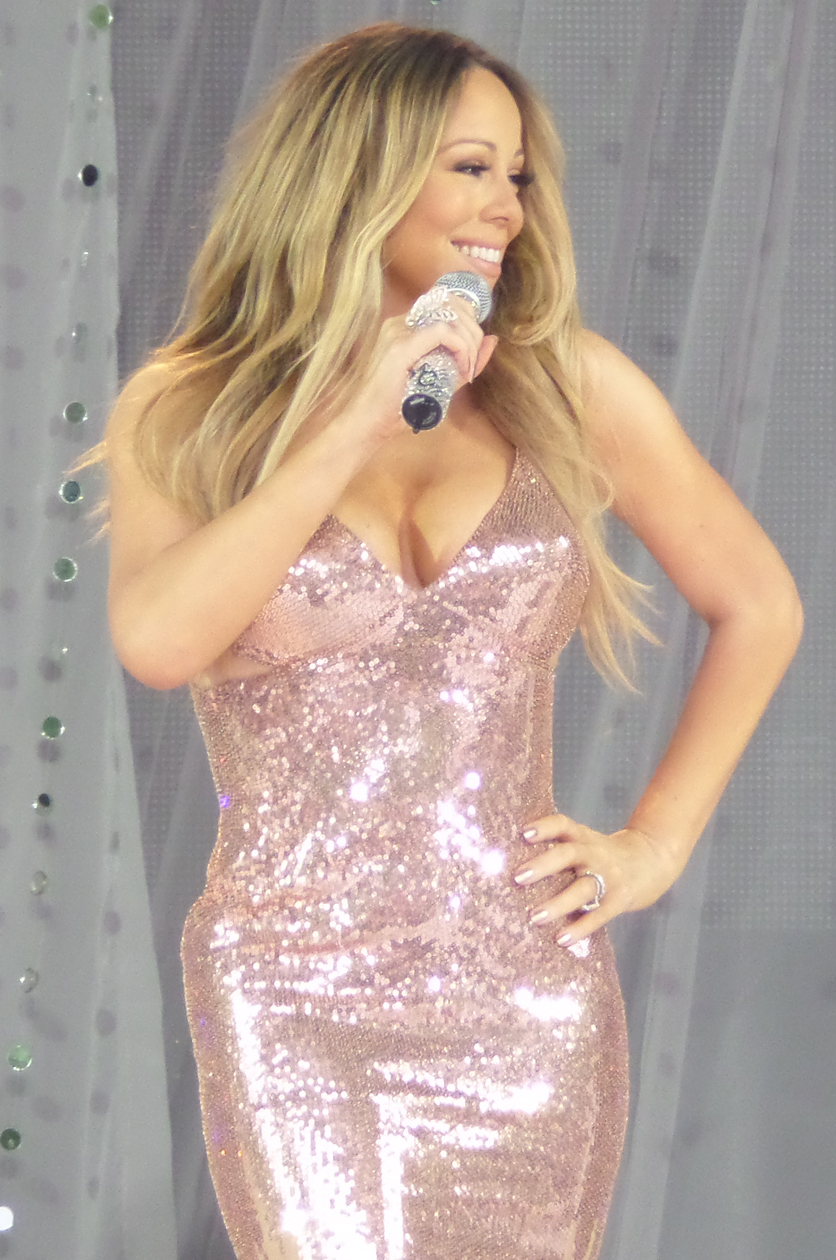
The Emancipation of Mimi revitalized Carey's career following a series of personal and professional setbacks.

The Emancipation of Mimi revitalized Carey's career after personal struggles, professional setbacks, and underperforming albums that fueled speculation of decline. Outlets such as The Guardian, Stereogum, and Time have ranked it as one of the greatest comebacks in popular music. In 2025, Ebony's Emanuel Okusanya credited it with reviving Carey's career and redefining the idea of a pop comeback. Some pushed back on the "comeback" label; Vice's David Lehmann argued it overshadowed the album's core themes. Carey herself initially disliked the tag—insisting she never "left"—but later embraced it. The Grammy Awards website wrote the album was a reminder that she was in "in full command of her artistry", embodying "a woman reclaiming her power in real-time".

The Emancipation of Mimi represented a shift in Carey's artistry and public persona, which Lehmann tied to her embracing years of public humiliation. He and Okusanya agreed it let her finally own her diva persona in a more light-hearted manner, with Lehmann saying that she became less fixated on global pop dominance and more rooted in R&B identity and absurd humor. Critics observed that her diva transformation and artistic liberation were supported by a glamorization of her wardrobe that had been sparse in her 1990s attire. Lehmann said The Emancipation of Mimi finally allowed her to pivot her identity to that of an R&B singer, in contrast to the pop star she had been heavily promoted as during the 1990s; he and Pitchfork said the musical change drew back younger fans as adults.

The Emancipation of Mimi allowed Carey to reestablish herself on her own terms rather than being measured against her earlier achievements. Despite lukewarm initial reviews, fans embraced it immediately, and critics have retrospectively acclaimed it as one of her finest works. The Houston Chronicle wrote that, despite award snubs, it "prov[ed] her critics wrong and solidif[ied] her place in pop royalty". Journalist Ed Gordon said it proved a triumph over naysayers. On its 2025 twentieth anniversary, millennials reflected on its emotional impact; Harper's Bazaar's Bianca Betancourt called it a symbol of liberation from critique. Vibe ranked it among the "50 Greatest Black Albums of the Modern Era", with Jessica Bennett dubbing it the definitive R&B soundtrack of 2005, its singles becoming ubiquitous across popular culture, particularly at events such as weddings and proms. Rolling Stone ranked it at number 389 on its list of the "500 Greatest Albums of All Time" (2023).

== Track listing ==
Standard track listing
| No. | Title | Writer(s) | Producer(s) | Length |
|---|---|---|---|---|
| 1. | "It's Like That" | Mariah Carey; Jermaine Dupri; Manuel Seal; Johntá Austin; (uncredited) Isaac Freeman; Douglas Davis; Slick Rick | Dupri; Carey; Seal | 3:23 |
| 2. | "We Belong Together" | Carey; Dupri; Seal; Austin; Darnell Bristol; Kenneth Edmonds; Sidney DeWayne; Bobby Womack; Patrick Moten; Sandra Sully | Dupri; Carey; Seal | 3:21 |
| 3. | "Shake It Off" | Carey; Dupri; Bryan-Michael Cox; Austin | Dupri; Carey; Cox | 3:52 |
| 4. | "Mine Again" | Carey; James Poyser | Poyser; Carey | 4:01 |
| 5. | "Say Somethin'" (featuring Snoop Dogg) | Carey; Pharrell Williams; Chad Hugo; Calvin Broadus | The Neptunes | 3:44 |
| 6. | "Stay the Night" | Carey; Kanye West; Thom Bell; Linda Creed | West; Carey | 3:57 |
| 7. | "Get Your Number" (featuring Jermaine Dupri) | Carey; Dupri; James Phillips; Cox; Austin; Steve Jolley; Tony Swain; Leslie John; Ashley Ingram | Dupri; Carey; LRoc | 3:15 |
| 8. | "One and Only" (featuring Twista) | Carey; Samuel Lindley; Carl Mitchell | The Legendary Traxster; Carey | 3:14 |
| 9. | "Circles" | Carey; James Wright | Carey; Wright | 3:30 |
| 10. | "Your Girl" | Carey; Marc Shemer | Scram Jones; Carey | 2:46 |
| 11. | "I Wish You Knew" | Carey; Wright | Carey; Wright | 3:34 |
| 12. | "To the Floor" (featuring Nelly) | Carey; Williams; Hugo; Cornell Haynes | The Neptunes | 3:27 |
| 13. | "Joy Ride" | Carey; Jeffery Grier | Young Genius; Carey | 4:03 |
| 14. | "Fly Like a Bird" | Carey; Wright | Carey; Wright | 3:52 |
| Total length: | | | | 50:10 |

Ultra Platinum Edition
| No. | Title | Writer(s) | Producer(s) | Length |
|---|---|---|---|---|
| 15. | "Don't Forget About Us" | Carey; Dupri; Cox; Austin | Carey; Dupri; Cox | 3:53 |
| 16. | "Makin' It Last All Night (What It Do)" (featuring Jermaine Dupri) | Carey; Dupri; Cox; Austin; Jarod Alston; Dalvin DeGrate; Donald DeGrate | Carey; Dupri | 3:51 |
| 17. | "So Lonely (One and Only Part II)" (featuring Twista) | Carl Mitchell; Carey; Rodney Jerkins; Adonis Shropshire; Makeba Riddick; LaShawn Daniels | Carey; Darkchild | 3:53 |
| 18. | "We Belong Together" (remix; featuring Jadakiss and Styles P) | Carey; Dupri; Seal; Austin; Edmonds; Bristol; DeWayne; Womack; Moten; Sully | DJ Clue; Jovonn Alexander (co) | 4:25 |
| Total length: | | | | 66:10 |

Ultra Platinum Deluxe Edition – (bonus DVD)
| No. | Title | Length |
|---|---|---|
| 1. | "It's Like That" (video) |
| 2. | "We Belong Together" (video) |
| 3. | "Shake It Off" (video) |
| 4. | "Get Your Number" (video) |
| 5. | "Don't Forget About Us" (video) |

20th anniversary edition – Disc One
| No. | Title | Writer(s) | Producer(s) | Length |
|---|---|---|---|---|
| 15. | "Don't Forget About Us" | Carey; Dupri; Cox; Austin | Carey; Dupri; Cox | 3:53 |
| 16. | "Makin' It Last All Night (What It Do)" (featuring Jermaine Dupri) | Carey; Dupri; Cox; Austin; Alston; The DeGrates | Carey; Dupri | 3:51 |
| 17. | "Sprung" | Carey; Imsomie Leeper; Gloria Jones; Pamela Sawyer | Carey; Mahogany Music | 3:26 |
| 18. | "Secret Love" | Carey; Kasseem Dean | Carey; Swizz Beatz | 3:09 |
| 19. | "We Belong Together" (Mimi's Late Night Valentine's Mix [extended]) | | | 7:18 |

20th anniversary edition – Disc Two
| No. | Title | Writer(s) | Producer(s) | Length |
|---|---|---|---|---|
| 1. | "When I Feel It" | Brian Holland; Edward Holland; Harold Beatty; Marcia Woods; Leeper; Carey | Mahogany Music | 3:09 |
| 2. | "Say Somethin'" (Solange Southern Star remix; featuring Solange Knowles and John Key) | | | 2:52 |
| 3. | "Don't Forget About Us" (Kaytranada remix) | | | 4:03 |
| 4. | "It's Like That" (Esentrik remix) | | | 4:29 |
| 5. | "So Lonely" (One and Only Part II) | | | 3:53 |
| 6. | "We Belong Together" (remix; featuring Jadakiss and Styles P) | | | 4:25 |
| 7. | "Don't Forget About Us" (Desert Storm remix) | | | 4:48 |
| 8. | "It's Like That" (Scott Storch remix) | | | 3:32 |
| 9. | "Shake It Off" (remix) | | | 5:03 |
| 10. | "Say Somethin'" (So So Def remix) | Carey; Dupri; Snoop Dogg; Hugo; Williams; Dem Franchize Boyz; J. Phillips | Carey; Dupri; LROC | 4:09 |
| 11. | "Your Girl" (Diplomat remix) | | | 2:44 |
| 12. | "Don't Forget About Us" (remix) | | | 3:32 |
| 13. | "It's Like That" (David Morales Classic Mix) | | | 8:58 |
| 14. | "Say Somethin'" (David Morales Stereo Anthem Mix) | | | 9:37 |
| 15. | "We Belong Together" (Peter Rauhofer Radio Mix) | | | 4:06 |
| 16. | "We Belong Together" (Atlantic Soul Radio Mix) | | | 4:22 |
| 17. | "Don't Forget About Us" (Ralphi Rosario & Craig J. Martini At XO Vocal Edit) | | | 3:40 |
| 18. | "Shake It Off" (A Cappella) | | | 3:53 |
| 19. | "Circles" (A Cappella) | | | 3:33 |
| 20. | "Joyride" (A Cappella) | | | 4:05 |
| 21. | "Don't Forget About Us / We Belong Together" (live from the American Music Awards) | | | 4:03 |

Sample credits

- "It's Like That" samples "Hollis Crew" by Run-DMC and "La Di Da Di" by Doug E. Fresh and MC Ricky D.
- "We Belong Together" samples "If You Think You're Lonely Now" by Bobby Womack.
- "Stay the Night" samples "Betcha by Golly Wow!" by Ramsey Lewis and "Who's in the House" by The 45 King.
- "Get Your Number" samples "Just an Illusion" by Imagination and "Weak at the Knees" by Steve Arrington.
- "Your Girl" samples "A Life with You" by Adeaze.
- "Sprung" samples "Do it Again" by The New Birth.
- "Makin' It Last All Night (What It Do)" samples "Freek'n You" by Jodeci.
- "We Belong Together" (Remix) samples "Two Occasions" by The Deele and "If You Think You're Lonely Now" by Bobby Womack.

== Personnel ==
Adapted from its liner notes

- Mariah Carey – producer (tracks 1–4, 6–11, 13–14), executive producer, vocals (all tracks), background vocals (tracks 1–3, 6, 8–11, 13–14)
- Courtney Bradley – background vocals (track 14)
- Calvin Broadus – vocals (track 5)
- Rick Brunermer – flute (tracks 4, 9, 11), tenor saxophone (9, 11)
- Jason Carson – assistant recording engineer (tracks 5, 12)
- Dana Jon Chappelle – recording engineer (tracks 4–6, 8–14)
- Andrew Coleman – recording engineer (tracks 5, 12)
- Bryan-Michael Cox – producer (track 3)
- Jeff Dieterie – trombone (tracks 4, 9, 11), bass trombone (9, 11)
- Darryl Dixon – alto saxophone (tracks 4, 9, 11)
- Charley Drayton – drums (tracks 4, 9, 11)
- Jermaine Dupri – producer (1–3, 7), audio mixing (3, 7), vocals (1, 3, 7)
- Manuel Farolfi – assistant recording engineer (tracks 6, 8–9, 14)
- Jason Finkel – assistant recording engineer (tracks 4, 6, 9, 11, 14)
- Isaac Freeman – additional rap vocals (track 1)
- Brian Frye – recording engineer (track 7)
- Brian Garten – recording engineer (all tracks), audio mixing
- Cornell Haynes – vocals (track 12)
- Loris Holland – additional keyboards (tracks 9, 11, 14)
- John Horesco – recording engineer (tracks 1–3, 7), audio mixing
- Chops Horns – horn (tracks 4, 9, 11)
- Chad Hugo – producer (tracks 5, 12)
- Ken Duro Ifill – mixing
- Randy Jackson – bass (tracks 4, 9, 11)
- Jeffrey Lee Johnson – guitar (tracks 4, 9, 11)
- Rev. Dr. Clarence Keaton – talking voice (track 14)
- Michael Leedy – assistant recording engineer (tracks 4, 6, 9, 11, 14)
- Samuel "Legendary Traxster" Lindley – producer (track 8)
- Trey Lorenz – background vocals (tracks 7, 11, 13–14)
- Manny Marroquin – audio mixing (track 6)
- Carl Mitchell – vocals (track 8)
- Mike Pierce – recording engineer (track 8)
- James Phillips – producer (track 7)
- Jason Phillips – vocals
- Herb Power – mastering
- James Poyser – producer, keyboard (track 4)
- L.A. Reid – executive producer
- Joe Romano – flugelhorn, trumpet (tracks 4, 9, 11)
- Manuel Seal – producer (tracks 1–2)
- Ernesto Shaw – mixing
- Marc Shemer – producer (track 10)
- Dexter Simmons – mixing
- David Styles – vocals
- Phil Tan – audio mixing (tracks 1–5, 7, 9, 11–14)
- Maryann Tatum – background vocals (tracks 1, 9–11, 14)
- Sherry Tatum – background vocals (tracks 1, 9, 11, 14)
- Pat Viala – audio mixing (tracks 8, 10)
- Jeff Villanueva – engineer
- Kanye West – producer (track 6)
- Pharrell Williams – producer, additional vocals (tracks 5, 12)
- James Wright – producer (9, 11, 14), keyboards (9, 11)

== Charts ==
=== Weekly charts ===
Weekly chart performance
| Chart (2005–06) | Peak position |
|---|---|
| Argentine Albums (CAPIF) | 5 |
| Australian Albums (ARIA) | 6 |
| Australian Urban Albums (ARIA) | 1 |
| Austrian Albums (Ö3 Austria) | 19 |
| Belgian Albums (Ultratop Flanders) | 31 |
| Belgian Albums (Ultratop Wallonia) | 26 |
| Canadian Albums (Billboard) | 2 |
| Czech Albums (ČNS IFPI) | 74 |
| Danish Albums (Hitlisten) | 2 |
| Dutch Albums (Album Top 100) | 8 |
| European Albums (Top 100) | 4 |
| French Albums (SNEP) | 4 |
| German Albums (Offizielle Top 100) | 14 |
| Greek Albums (IFPI) | 1 |
| Irish Albums (IRMA) | 18 |
| Italian Albums (FIMI) | 15 |
| Japanese Albums (Oricon) | 2 |
| New Zealand Albums (RMNZ) | 12 |
| Polish Albums (ZPAV) | 22 |
| Portuguese Albums (AFP) | 25 |
| Scottish Albums (Official Charts) | 31 |
| Singaporean Albums (RIAS) | 1 |
| Spanish Albums (Promusicae) | 15 |
| Swedish Albums (Sverigetopplistan) | 32 |
| Swiss Albums (Schweizer Hitparade) | 9 |
| Taiwanese Albums (Five Music) | 2 |
| UK Albums (Official Charts) | 7 |
| UK Jazz & Blues Albums (Official Charts) | 18 |
| UK R&B Albums (Official Charts) | 2 |
| US Billboard 200 | 1 |
| US Top R&B/Hip-Hop Albums (Billboard) | 1 |

| Chart (2025) | Peak position |
|---|---|
| Japanese International Albums (Oricon) 20th Anniversary Edition | 15 |
| UK Album Downloads (Official Charts) | 68 |
| UK R&B Albums (Official Charts) | 7 |

=== Monthly charts ===
Monthly chart performance
| Chart (2005) | Peak position |
|---|---|
| South Korean Albums (RIAK) | 3 |

=== Year-end charts ===
Year-end chart performance
| Chart (2005) | Position |
|---|---|
| Australian Albums (ARIA) | 27 |
| Australian Urban Albums (ARIA) | 4 |
| Belgian Albums (Ultratop Wallonia) | 94 |
| Dutch Albums (Album Top 100) | 47 |
| French Albums (SNEP) | 58 |
| German Albums (Offizielle Top 100) | 79 |
| Japanese Albums (Oricon) | 51 |
| New Zealand Albums (RMNZ) | 42 |
| Swiss Albums (Schweizer Hitparade) | 78 |
| UK Albums (OCC) | 31 |
| US Billboard 200 | 4 |
| US Top R&B/Hip-Hop Albums (Billboard) | 2 |
| Worldwide Albums (IFPI) | 2 |
| Chart (2006) | Position |
| Australian Urban Albums (ARIA) | 17 |
| US Billboard 200 | 11 |
| US Top R&B/Hip-Hop Albums (Billboard) | 7 |

=== Decade-end charts ===
Decade-end chart performance
| Chart (2000–2009) | Position |
|---|---|
| US Billboard 200 | 27 |
| US Top R&B/Hip-Hop Albums (Billboard) | 6 |

=== All-time charts ===
All-time chart performance
| Chart | Position |
|---|---|
| US Billboard 200 | 52 |
| US Billboard 200 (Women) | 19 |

== Certifications ==
Certifications and sales
| Region | Certification | Certified units/sales |
|---|---|---|
| Australia (ARIA) | Platinum | 70,000^{^} |
| Brazil (Pro-Música Brasil) | Gold | 60,000 |
| Canada (Music Canada) | 3× Platinum | 300,000^{^} |
| France (SNEP) | Gold | 100,000^{*} |
| Germany (BVMI) | Gold | 100,000^{‡} |
| Hong Kong (IFPI Hong Kong) | Gold | 10,000^{*} |
| Japan (RIAJ) | Platinum | 259,275 |
| New Zealand (RMNZ) | 2× Platinum | 30,000^{‡} |
| South Korea | — | 15,239 |
| United Kingdom (BPI) | 2× Platinum | 671,000 |
| United States (RIAA) | 7× Platinum | 6,100,000 (Note: US sales as of November 2018) |
Summaries
| Europe (IFPI) | Platinum | 1,000,000^{*} |
| Worldwide | — | 10,000,000 |
^{*} Sales figures based on certification alone.^{^} Shipments figures based on certification alone.^{‡} Sales+streaming figures based on certification alone.

== Release history ==
Release dates and formats for The Emancipation of Mimi
| Region | Date | Format(s) | Label(s) | Ref. |
|---|---|---|---|---|
| United Kingdom | April 2, 2005 | CD with bonus track "Sprung"; CD limited edition digipak | Mercury | |
| United Kingdom | November 14, 2005 | CD (Ultra Platinum edition); CD+DVD (Ultra Platinum edition) | Mercury | |

== See also ==
- List of best-selling albums by women
- List of best-selling albums by year in the United States
- List of best-selling albums of the 21st century
