= Say Somethin' (Mariah Carey song) =

2006 single by Mariah Carey

Single by Mariah Carey featuring Snoop Dogg

from the album The Emancipation of Mimi
- Released: April 3, 2006
- Recorded: November 2004
- Studio: The Record Plant (Los Angeles, CA)
- Genre: R&B; hip hop
- Length: 3:44
- Label: Island
- Songwriters: Mariah Carey; Chad Hugo; Pharrell Williams; Snoop Dogg
- Producer: The Neptunes

Mariah Carey singles chronology
| "Fly Like a Bird" (2006) | "Say Somethin'" (2006) | "Lil' L.O.V.E." (2007) |

Snoop Dogg singles chronology
| "Gangsta Zone" (2005) | "Say Somethin'" (2006) | "Buttons" (2006) |

Music video
- "Say Somethin'" on YouTube

"Say Somethin'" is a song by American singer-songwriter Mariah Carey. It was written by Carey, Snoop Dogg, Chad Hugo, and Pharrell Williams, and produced by The Neptunes as the sixth and final single from Carey's tenth studio album, The Emancipation of Mimi (2005). The song is one of few from Carey's catalog in which she does not share production credits. "Say Somethin'" features Dogg as a guest artist, and is influenced by R&B and hip-hop music genres. Lyrically, the song is a dialogue between a man and a woman discussing sexual themes and acts of which they plan to engage in a restroom.

The song received generally mixed reviews from music critics, many of which both praised and dismissed its production and vocals. Some reviewers felt Carey's performance was too typical for a singer of her stature, while others felt the song's complex instrumentation distracted from the artists. Commercially, it reached the top 30 in Australia, Ireland, and the United Kingdom.

"Say Somethin'" was accompanied by a high profile and budget music video, filmed by Paul Hunter in Paris, France, and featuring appearances by Carey, Williams, Dogg and fashion designer and Vogue editor, André Leon Talley. The video features Carey and Williams as love interests being chased by several paparazzi vehicles down a populated Paris road. Other scenes feature Carey trying on several outfits in Louis Vuitton's flagship store on Champs-Élysées, as well as close-up shots of Snoop Dogg. The video concluded with the duo walking together down the Le Pont de Paris bridge, overlooking the Seine river.

== Background ==
Following record-breaking success throughout the 1990s, Carey departed from Columbia Records after the release of Rainbow (1999). Almost a year later, she signed an unprecedented $100 million five-album record contract with Virgin Records, and began work on a film and soundtrack project titled Glitter. Prior to its release on September 11, 2001, Carey suffered an "emotional and physical breakdown", and was subsequently hospitalized over a period of several weeks. Glitter became a box-office bomb, earning less than eight million dollars, and receiving scathing reviews. The soundtrack, while faring slightly better, failed to reach the critical or commercial heights of Carey's previous releases, and eventually lead to the annulment of her record contract with Virgin.

Following the events, as well as the release of Carey's succeeding album, Charmbracelet (2002), she began working on new material for The Emancipation of Mimi (2005). Towards the end of 2004, Carey was already conceptualizing and writing music for her upcoming album. During a studio rendezvous with Pharrell Williams, Carey was once again introduced to Snoop Dogg, having worked with him on a single from her seventh studio album Rainbow (1999) titled, "Crybaby". Following a brief meeting with the pair, Carey showed them the yet unfinished version of "Say Somethin'", and had Dogg complete a rap verse for the song. To MTV, the rapper further elaborated on the song: "We were working in the same studio. I was in the front end and she was in the back, and Pharrell actually made it happen. He was like, Come down the hallway and get on this mic right now. And it was down to another superstar mate to give him direction. Nelly was there too. He gave me direction on which way to take my rap. Despite her reputation as being notoriously hard to please, Mariah's very happy with the results".

== Recording ==
"Say Somethin'" had been the second time the pair had collaborated, the first had been on "Crybaby" from Carey's seventh studio album Rainbow in 1999. Following the song's completion in November 2004, Snoop Dogg made several comments regarding his work with Carey in an interview with MTV News, even re-calling past sentiments towards her many years prior:

She's so soft. She's beautiful too. I always tell her this story: When I was locked up in jail, that song 'Vision of Love' was the hottest song in the world. I used to always say, 'Man, if I could meet her!' So I worked with her, then Pharrell hooked it up for me to work with her again this time.

After Carey finished writing and producing the track alongside Williams, Dogg added his rap verse, and added some ulterior beats and components. Before taking the still-uncompleted song to the studio, Dogg described the song and beat "The beat was just sick and it was bangin'. I was like, 'All right, give me that, M.C.' I took [the song] down to my studio and flipped my style to it." After slightly altering the song, as well as adding his verses, Dogg met with Carey once again for her approval on the song, "When I played [the finished version] for her, she was like, 'Oh, I love it!' I said, 'OK, give me a hug, baby.' She was just as soft as a cotton swab! Lord have mercy! Jesus, M.C.! What I wouldn't ... Let me stop."

== Release ==
As January 2005 drew near, Carey had already completed many tracks for her yet-untitled studio album. However, after releasing the album's title, The Emancipation of Mimi (2005), "Say Somethin'" leaked, and was to be promoted as the project's lead single. While the song was universally chosen as Carey's next single, former Island Records head L.A. Reid suggested Carey travel to Atlanta for a period of three days to work with Jermaine Dupri. In an interview with MTV, Carey recalled the decision with Reid: "L.A. was like, 'You and Jermaine Dupri make magic together, why aren't you in the studio with him? I said, 'I love Jermaine, is he free? I know he's doing a million things, Usher and this and that.' But Jermaine said, 'Come on down.'" During the following interval of three days, the pair helmed the album's eventual third and fourth singles, "Shake It Off" and "Get Your Number". During her trip to Atlanta, Carey began second guessing the album's direction, and described her feelings regarding the decision in an interview with MTV News:

I really started second-guessing myself. And then I realized, like, all right, I have to go with my gut. Because everybody's got an opinion, and so many people's opinions about me are like polar opposites. They're like, 'We love it when she does ballads, make her do the ballads.' Then they're like, 'We want to hear a hip-hop record.' 'Why is she dressing like this? She should show less skin.' 'She should show more.' You know what I mean? I'm like, 'Stay in your lane, and I'll figure it out.'

After returning to home to re-arrange the album with Reid, Carey once again traveled to Atlanta in an attempt to create a few more strong singles for the album's roster. On her second stay in Dupri's hometown, the duo completed "We Belong Together" and "It's Like That", with the latter of the two replacing "Say Somethin'" as the albums's lead single. "Say Somethin" was then chosen to become the third single from the album, however, those plans were scrapped as well. Following the extended chart success of The Emancipation of Mimi, "Fly Like a Bird" was released as the sixth single from the project and "Say Somethin" was released as seventh and final single from the album. "Fly Like a Bird" was released on April 3, 2006, to urban radio and gospel stations, while "Say Somethin'" was serviced to mainstream Top 40 radio. Tom Ferguson from Billboard did not agree with releasing both singles concurrently, as he had given "Say Somethin'" a negative review. According to Ferguson, while the latter had radio appeal, its "scantily produced drum'n'bass" only distracted, concluding "'Fly Like A Bird' is a classic: why muddy the water with this release." CDs were released in Austria and Germany on June 2, 2005. In the United Kingdom, "Say Somethin'" was released as a CD single on June 5. A release in Taiwan followed on June 16. On January 29, 2021, an EP was issued.

== Composition ==
"Say Somethin'"
A sample of the song's chorus, featuring its racy lyrics, as well as the odd musical arrangement and drum pattern.

"Say Somethin'" is a mid-tempo song lasting three minutes and forty-four seconds, while drawing influence from R&B and hip-hop music genres. It incorporates its beat from several musical instruments, including the organ, bass drum and several electronic and computerized sound effects. According to the sheet music published at Musicnotes.com by EMI Music Publishing, the song is set in common time with a moderate tempo of 110 beats per minute. Written by Carey, Snoop Dogg, Chad Hugo, and Pharrell Williams, and produced by The Neptunes, the song is composed in the key of E minor, with Carey's vocal range spanning from the low-note of F♯_{3} to the high-note of B_{5}. The song's chorus has a chord progression of Emaj7 to Amaj7, while altering to a B minor during the bridge. Dimitri Ehrlich from Vibe called the song "a musical oddity" and described its production as "strange instrumentation, weird melodic shifts, and hectic drum patters".

In his review for The Emancipation of Mimi (2005), Jozen Cummings from PopMatters described the song's production and instrumentation: "The track is vintage Neptunes with big drums and intergalactic sound effects, and Carey adds to the breezy, easygoing feel of the song with a voice that is sexy, but subtle, like a shy woman who doesn’t need to say anything at all to get a man’s attention." Lyrically, "Say Somethin'" recalls an encounter in which a male expresses interest in having a sexual affair in a bathroom with a female, while she agrees and responds "If its worth you're while / Say somethin' good to me". In an interview with Newsweek, Carey described how she felt regarding the song: "You're right. It is a totally different approach for me musically. When I heard it at first I thought it was a cool and interesting track, but I didn't know if it was very me." Additionally, Carey outed the lines "Something like volcanic / You and me seems organic / Just like stars and planets" as "nonsense", but claimed she "loved it".

== Critical reception ==
"Say Somethin'" garnered generally mixed reviews from music critics, many of which praised Carey for broadening her musical palette with the release, however criticizing its production and hook. Michael Paoletta from Billboard described the song's production as a "series of gimmicks", and felt it was reminiscent of melodies used to boost the careers of "lesser artists". Concluding the review on a mixed note, Paoletta wrote "the melody line is palpable and Carey's voice is appreciable, but "Say Somethin'" is mostly a reminder of a time when Carey required others to boost her chart heft." USA Today critic Elysa Gardner called the song "breezy and playful", while Jim Abbott from the Orlando Sentinel classified it as a "high point" on The Emancipation of Mimi (2005).

Writer Barry Walters from Rolling Stone felt the song failed to produce a significant and memorable hook, though noting its dance appeal: "it has a beat that makes you move, but the songs' pop hook doesn't stick." While New York Times columnist Jon Pareles called the song an "earthy delight", Glenn Gamboa from Newsday felt Carey's vocals could have easily been replaced by a less skilled singer, and wrote "she sounds like a hook girl in her own song. Her vocals could have been delivered by Kelis or Amerie and no one would have been the wiser."

== Chart performance ==
"Say Somethin'" was released to rhythmic and Top 40 radio stations in the United States on April 3, 2006, during the same period that "Fly Like a Bird" was released to Urban radio stations. The song only managed to attain a peak position of number seventy-nine on the Billboard Hot 100. Internationally, "Say Somethin'" debuted at its peak position of number twenty-six on the Australian Singles Chart during the week dated July 23, 2006. Sustaining an appearance on the singles chart for seven weeks, the song fell outside the top fifty on September 3, 2006. In Switzerland, it appeared on the singles chart on June 18, 2006, at number sixty. The following week, it ascended to its peak of number fifty-five, before spending another four weeks fluctuating in the Swiss Singles Chart. On the UK Singles Chart, "Say Somethin'" made its chart debut at number 128 on May 13, 2006. Spending only four weeks in the top 100, the song managed to peak at number twenty-seven in its second week, before plummeting off the chart on July 1, 2006. "Say Somethin'" attained positions in other notable countries, charting for one week in Ireland at number twenty-three, and number sixty-three in Germany.

== Music video ==
=== Background ===
Carey's record label had initially wanted "Say Somethin'" to be released as the fourth single from the album, following "Shake It Off"; the music videos for both "Shake It Off" and "Say Somethin'" were originally set to be directed by Brett Ratner. However, Carey then chose British director Jake Nava instead, with whom she has worked on several video projects. Nava was set to film both singles' music videos until the "Say Somethin'" shoot was abruptly cancelled due to Carey's label deciding not to release it as the fourth single. He would go on to direct Carey in the music video for "Get Your Number".

The high-profile music video for "Say Somethin'" was ultimately directed by Paul Hunter, who had previously worked with Carey on the music videos for both "Honey" and "Don't Forget About Us". The music video was predominately shot in Paris, France, in March 2006. Snoop Dogg and Pharrell Williams are both featured in the video, with the latter playing Carey's love interest. Additionally, a cameo appearance is made by André Leon Talley (1948–2022), a close friend and stylist of Carey's, whom retired from his career as a fashion designer and the first black Vogue editor. In an interview with MTV News, Carey described the trip to France, as well as the video's behind-the-scenes moments:

You know what was so great about being in Paris? Usually I'm inside a hotel room and I don't get to see anything. This time, I finally got to drive around the city, walk around the city and hang out. I love Paris; I love the electricity this city has. And it gave me a new perspective on this song, which is one of the first songs I recorded for [The Emancipation of Mimi]. It's got a hot vibe to it, when you're driving around in the car on a normal, rainy day in Paris, driving around in circles in a Maserati — who doesn't do that every day?

Aside from the several actors portraying paparazzi throughout the video, Hunter included several shots of actual French paparazzi on scooters, whom had attempted to photograph Carey during the video's actual filming. Hunter claimed the additions made the video feel more realistic. For the video's primary filming locations, Carey chose Louis Vuitton's flagship store on Champs-Élysées, one of the most prestigious avenues in Paris, which was temporarily shut down for the music video shoot. When describing the experience filming in the boutique, Carey explained, "Obviously, being able to take your pick of anything in the store and have the whole store shut down for you is every girl's dream. You know, just a pretty standard day in the life of anybody. No, just joking. There was a time in my life I only had one pair of shoes, so that's my justification for having that little perk on the job." After filming concluded in France, Snoop Dogg's scenes were filmed on a Sunday in Los Angeles. When asked why Snoop Dogg was not present during the Paris shoot, Carey jokingly stated:

If you guys think I'm a diva and I have requirements, Snoop is the next level [diva]. He's the hip-hop king! So his requirements to get to Paris are, like, beyond platinum editions; they're, like, beyond ultra-platinum editions; they're like diamond editions. So[,] we love Snoop and we wish he had been here, but I think shooting [with] him in L.A. will be good because we'll have more time, more control. He probably would have gotten really mobbed in the streets here anyway.

=== Synopsis ===
As the song's musical introduction begins, "Mimi" is shown on the screen in black letters. As they fade, a silver Maserati is shown driving down a populated Paris road, with several black Mercedes-Benz sedans following in close proximity. As several paparazzi begin photographing Carey's vehicle through the many vehicle's sunroofs and windows, close-up shots of Snoop Dogg, as well as alternate scenes of Carey, dressed in a polka dot bikini, while on a bed of personalized Louis Vuitton luggage are interspersed. As the video returns to the main scene, Carey is shown inside her car with Pharrell Williams, where he begins caressing her legs and touching her sensually. Following the chase, Carey, alongside Dogg, are shown inside a jewelry store, where the pair try on several pairs of earrings and rings. The video resumes with Carey dressed in a long trench-coat, strutting inside Louis Vuitton's flagship store on Champs-Élysées. Scenes of Carey trying on several outfits and stilettos are shown, as Vogue's André Leon Talley makes a cameo appearance as an employee. After leaving the boutique, Carey and Williams are shown walking down the Le Pont de Paris bridge, overlooking the Seine river. The pair caress each other intimately, and continue down the public bridge in a close embrace. Serving as the final scene in the video, Williams brings Carey back to his "bachelor pad", which in reality, was Carey's hotel room during filming. As the duo reaches the suite, additional close-ups of Dogg's face are shown. The video concludes with Carey sitting atop Williams at a breakfast table, as well as running together down the bridge. The scene fades, and the word "Fin" shown, meaning "Finish" in French.

== Formats and track listings ==
Digital download - So So Def Remix

1. "Say Somethin'" (So So Def Remix – Radio Edit) – 4:09

Digital download - Remixes By David Morales

1. "Say Somethin'" (Morales Radio Edit) – 3:43

Digital download - Remixes By David Morales

1. "Say Somethin'" (Stereo Anthem Mix) – 9:37

European CD single

1. "Say Somethin'" (Album Version) – 3:44
2. "Say Somethin'" (Morales Radio Edit) – 3:43

International enhanced CD single

1. "Say Somethin'" (Album Version) – 3:44
2. "Say Somethin'" (Stereo Anthem Mix) – 9:40
3. "Say Somethin'" (Stereo Dub) – 9:35
4. "Say Somethin'" (Video)

UK 12-inch vinyl

1. "Say Somethin'" (Stereo Anthem Mix) – 9:40
2. "Say Somethin'" (Instrumental) – 3:44
3. "Say Somethin'" (Stereo Dub) – 9:35
4. "Say Somethin'" (A Cappella) – 3:44

US 12-inch vinyl - So So Def Remix

A1. "Say Somethin' Remix" (Radio) – 4:09
A2. "Say Somethin' Remix" (Main) – 4:10
A3. "Say Somethin' Remix" (Instrumental) – 4:10
B1. "Say Somethin' Remix" (Radio) – 4:09
B2. "Say Somethin' Remix" (Main) – 4:10
B3. "Say Somethin' Remix" (Instrumental) – 4:10

Say Somethin' EP

1. "Say Somethin'" (feat. Dem Franchize Boyz) [So So Def Remix] – 4:09
2. "Say Somethin'" (feat. Dem Franchize Boyz) [So So Def Instrumental] – 4:10
3. "Say Somethin'" (David Morales Stereo Anthem Mix) – 9:37
4. "Say Somethin'" (David Morales Radio Edit) – 3:47
5. "Say Somethin'" (David Morales Stereo Dub Mix) – 9:31
6. "Say Somethin'" (Instrumental) – 3:47

== Credits and personnel ==
Credits are adapted from The Emancipation of Mimi liner notes.

- Mariah Carey – vocalist, songwriter
- Snoop Dogg – rapping, songwriter
- Chad Hugo – songwriter
- Pharrell Williams – songwriter, background vocals
- The Neptunes – producer
- David Morales – remix, additional production
- Jermaine Dupri – mixing, producer
- Brian Garten – recording

== Charts ==
=== Weekly charts ===
Weekly chart performance for "Say Somethin'"
| Chart (2006) | Peak position |
|---|---|
| Australia (ARIA) | 26 |
| Australian Urban (ARIA) | 7 |
| Canada CHR/Pop (Radio & Records) | 19 |
| Belgium (Ultratip Bubbling Under Flanders) | 3 |
| Belgium (Ultratip Bubbling Under Wallonia) | 10 |
| European Hot 100 Singles (Billboard) | 60 |
| Germany (Official German Charts) | 63 |
| Germany Urban (Deutsche Black Charts) | 8 |
| Global Dance Songs (Billboard) | 20 |
| Ireland (IRMA) | 23 |
| Italy (FIMI) | 32 |
| Scottish Singles Sales (Official Charts) | 21 |
| Switzerland (Schweizer Hitparade) | 55 |
| UK Singles (Official Charts) | 27 |
| UK Hip Hop/R&B (Official Charts) | 3 |
| UK Club (Music Week) David Morales mixes | 5 |
| UK Pop Club (Music Week) David Morales mixes | 5 |
| UK Urban Club (Music Week) | 6 |
| US Billboard Hot 100 | 79 |
| US Dance Club Songs (Billboard) D. Morales Mixes | 1 |
| US Dance Airplay (Billboard) | 3 |
| US Hot R&B/Hip-Hop Singles Sales (Billboard) | 36 |
| US Pop Airplay (Billboard) | 23 |
| US Pop 100 (Billboard) | 46 |
| US Rhythmic Airplay (Billboard) | 25 |
| US CHR/Pop (Radio & Records) | 23 |
| US CHR/Rhythmic (Radio & Records) | 26 |

=== Year-end charts ===
Year-end chart performance for "Say Somethin'"
| Chart (2006) | Position |
|---|---|
| UK Urban (Music Week) | 29 |
| US Dance Club Songs (Billboard) | 35 |

== Release history ==
Release dates and formats for "Say Somethin'"
| Region | Date | Format | Label(s) | Ref. |
|---|---|---|---|---|
| United States | April 4, 2006 | Mainstream airplay | Island | |

== See also ==
- List of number-one dance singles of 2006 (U.S.)
