= Fly Like a Bird =

2006 promotional single by Mariah Carey

Single by Mariah Carey

from the album The Emancipation of Mimi
- B-side: "My Saving Grace"
- Released: March 13, 2006
- Recorded: 2004
- Studio: Right Track Studios (New York City); Capri Studios (Capri)
- Genre: Gospel; soul; R&B; neo soul
- Length: 3:52
- Label: Island
- Composers: Mariah Carey; James "Big Jim" Wright
- Lyricist: Mariah Carey
- Producers: Mariah Carey; James Wright

Mariah Carey singles chronology
"So Lonely" (2006)	"Fly Like a Bird" (2006)	"Say Somethin'" (2006)

Audio video
- "Fly Like a Bird" on YouTube

"Fly Like a Bird" is a song by American singer-songwriter Mariah Carey, released on March 13, 2006, by Island Records as the fifth single from her tenth studio album, The Emancipation of Mimi (2005). Written and produced by Carey and James "Big Jim" Wright, the song is influenced by gospel, soul, and R&B music genres. Its arrangement is built on piano chords and guitar melodies, and features Carey's pastor Clarence Keaton, who recites two Biblical verses during the song's introduction and bridge. Carey described "Fly Like a Bird" as the most personal and religious track from The Emancipation of Mimi, with its lyrics featuring a veritable prayer to God: "Fly like a bird, take to the sky, I need you now Lord, carry me high!".

At the time of its release, "Fly Like a Bird" received acclaim from music critics. While many praised Carey's strong vocal performance throughout its climax, many pinpointed on its lyrical content and compared it to Carey's debut song, "Vision of Love". Released as the final single from its parent album, the song was only sent to adult contemporary and gospel radio stations, during the same time "Say Somethin'" was commissioned to mainstream channels. Carey performed the song on several high-profile industry events, including the 48th annual Grammy Awards, the Shelter from the Storm: A Concert for the Gulf Coast concert charity benefit, and Idol Gives Back. Additionally, Carey included the song on the set-lists for all her succeeding tours since its release, up to the Caution World Tour.

== Background and recording ==
Following record-breaking success throughout the 1990s, Carey departed from Columbia Records after the release of Rainbow (1999). Almost a year later, she signed an unprecedented $100 million five-album record contract with Virgin Records, and began work on a film and soundtrack project titled Glitter. Prior to its release on September 11, 2001, Carey suffered an "emotional and physical breakdown", and was subsequently hospitalized over a period of several weeks. Glitter became a box-office bomb, earning less than eight million dollars, and receiving scathing reviews. The soundtrack, while faring slightly better, failed to reach the critical or commercial heights of Carey's previous releases, and eventually lead to the annulment of her record contract with Virgin.

Following the events, as well as the release of Carey's succeeding album, Charmbracelet (2002), she began working on new material for The Emancipation of Mimi (2005). Aside from the dance-influenced tracks and the ballads, Carey created a concept, in which a song's lyrics would reach out to God. She created the song's choral lyrics, melody and main instrumentation, before calling James "Big Jim" Wright for a collaboration. During their meeting, Wright helped Carey arrange the song's chord structure, as well as produce the introduction, while Carey finished the rest of the lyrics. Once completing "Fly Like a Bird", Carey had her pastor, Clarence Keaton, read two verses from the Bible on the song, "Weeping may endure for the night, but joy comes in the morning" (Psalm 30:5) during the introduction, and "He said 'He'll never forsake you, or leave you alone' Trust him" (Hebrews 13:5). According to Carey, the song, as well as the Biblical verses, were included on her "comeback album" because they helped her get through many difficult situations in the past. She described moments that were difficult growing up, during which she reached out to God, as well as during her breakdown, when she used such verses to give her faith. Carey explained how although the verses helped her greatly, no one had ever said them to her. For this reason, she wanted to make sure they were there for fans and listeners to hear, in order to give them faith and assurance lest they be in a grave situation.

=== Release ===
Following the extended chart success of The Emancipation of Mimi, "Fly Like a Bird" was released as a single from the project. Simultaneously promoted alongside "Say Somethin', the song was released on March 13, 2006 to urban, urban AC and gospel stations, while the latter to mainstream Top 40 channels. "Fly Like a Bird" was only commercially available as a digital download. Tom Ferguson from Billboard did not agree with releasing both singles concurrently, as he had given "Say Somethin'" a negative review. According to Ferguson, while the latter had radio appeal, its "scantily produced drum'n'bass" only distracted, concluding "'Fly Like A Bird' is a classic: why muddy the water with this release."

== Composition ==
"Fly Like a Bird"
A sample of the song's climax, featuring Carey's upper vocal registers as well as the inclusion of the gospel choir.

"Fly Like a Bird" is a mid-tempo ballad, drawing influence from gospel, soul and R&B music genres. It incorporates music from several musical instruments, including the organ, bass drum and trumpet. According to the sheet music published at Musicnotes.com by EMI Music Publishing, the song is set in common time with a moderate tempo of 54 beats per minute. It is composed in the key of C♯ minor (with modulation) to D minor at the song's climax, with Carey's vocal range spanning almost four octaves, from the low-note of B_{2} in a background note to the high-note of A_{6}. The song's chorus has a chord progression of F♯m7-Bm-G/A-Bmaj7 in the verses, while changing into Gmaj7 during the bridge. Lyrically, "Fly Like a Bird" boasts a prayer in which the protagonist asks God for help during difficult times, and to carry them "higher and higher". Cintra Wilson from LA Weekly described the song's lyrics in depth, as well as where she felt the yearning lyrics stemmed from:

'Fly Like A Bird', is a kitchen-sink, hyper-produced gospel number, but is really quite moving. There is a real, human yearning for mercy in it — Mariah’s true cry for help from a place of near-suicidal despair: 'Sometimes this life can be so cold /(Lord) I pray you'll come and carry me home'. But there’s a lot of hope and faith in this wounded voice: Carey keeps, with touching conviction, a firm grip on the idea that some higher, divine intelligence out there loves her, even if nobody else does; even if she is lost to herself. It comes across emotionally, because her heart is fully in it — Mimi has been beaten, humiliated, heartbroken; joys have been slapped out of her hands quicker than she could appreciate them. She’s deeply confused, and God, she really needs help. Hell: We’ve all been there.

Entertainment Weekly's Tom Sinclair described the song as a "veritable prayer that explicitly references God", and highlighted the lines "Sometimes this life can be so cold / I pray you'll come and carry me home, Carry me higher, higher, higher." According to Carey, the song holds deep lyrical meaning for herself, as well as her fans. She compared it to older emotional ballads from her career, and described the sentiment they held for many fans "Usually, I'll have an introspective bleak-outlook-on-life song. In the past it's been 'Petals' or 'Close My Eyes'. Those were the ones that the hard-core fans related to most. But this has a hopefulness to it. That's why it's one of my favorites, too." Additionally, Carey outed Keaton's verse during the song's introduction as her favorite part of the song, and included it as a guide for fans, due to the help it had given her in the past:

'To me the most important thing is the message he says in the beginning of the song,' she notes. 'Weeping may endure for a night, but joy comes in the morning.' I felt like a lot of people may not hear that message and a lot of people need to. It wasn't to be preachy. A lot of times people will hear songs that I write that are not the typical songs people look at as 'Mariah Carey songs.'

== Critical reception ==
"Fly Like a Bird" received acclaim from music critics, many of whom praised Carey's gospel-flavored vocal performance, as well as the song's lyrical content. Critic Jim DeRogatis from the Chicago Sun-Times called Carey's voice as "one-in-a-million", and wrote "she's never been shy about showing off with frequently annoying octave-spanning trills – and her instrument seems to be intact; witness the display of bravado on 'Fly Like a Bird'." When describing the song, Dina Passaro from Newsday wrote "This songstress is back and better than ever!" and claimed Carey "sounds awesome and tears it apart". Tom Ferguson from Billboard called the track a "classic", and wrote "the re-crowned diva delivers a consummate vocal." Similarly, in a separate review for the song, Ferguson went into detail regarding Carey's performance in "Fly Like a Bird":

The Emancipation of Mimi spawns yet another career-redefining hit in the sweet, soulful "Fly Like a Bird", an honest-to-God religious mantra about redemption. Set against a low-key, organ-spiced groove that recalls mid-'70s R&B, Carey opens with a pretty, wispy vocal and buoyant harmonies throughout the first chorus before she waves her arms, parts the clouds and wails to the heavens as a mile-high wall of gospel background vocals joins in for the crescendo. The flight of 'Bird' from humble call for deliverance into a frenzied ecclesiastic hymn is utterly spine-tingling. A joyful noise.

Entertainment Weekly's Tom Sinclair outed the song as a "heart-on-my-sleeve number", and called it the "crux of the album". Sal Cinquemani from Slant Magazine felt the song "made Mariah likeable again" and wrote "[it's] an inspirational ballad that's equal parts 'Butterfly' and 'Hero'." A writer from the Sarasota Herald-Tribune compared it to Carey's debut single, "Vision of Love", and called it one of the best cuts from The Emancipation of Mimi.

== Commercial performance ==
During April 2006, "Fly Like a Bird" was released to US urban and adult contemporary radio stations, at the same time "Say Somethin'" (featuring Snoop Dogg, the sixth single from The Emancipation of Mimi), was released to pop and rhythmic radio stations. "Fly Like a Bird" failed to chart on the Billboard Hot 100, instead reaching number four on Billboards Bubbling Under Hot 100 Singles chart, which represents the twenty-five songs below the Hot 100's number 100 position that have not yet appeared on the Hot 100. It peaked at number nineteen on Billboard's Hot R&B/Hip-Hop Songs chart and topped the Adult R&B Songs chart for six weeks. The song experienced longevity in the urban market, reaching its peak on the R&B/Hip-Hop Songs chart in its twenty-fourth week.

== Music video ==
Following the radio premiere of "Say Somethin'", as well as the video release, MTV News reported that Carey would film a music video for "Fly Like a Bird" at the end of March 2006. According to Carey, the video had already been conceptualized by mid-March, with a script featuring Carey, Keaton and a church choir as the main focuses. In a later interview, Carey said, "We don't have a lot of time to do it. It's not a big-budget thing. But it doesn't need to be. It just needs to be about the song, capturing the song and the emotion of it." While plans for the video's filming were made, a final version was never released or commissioned.

== Live performances ==
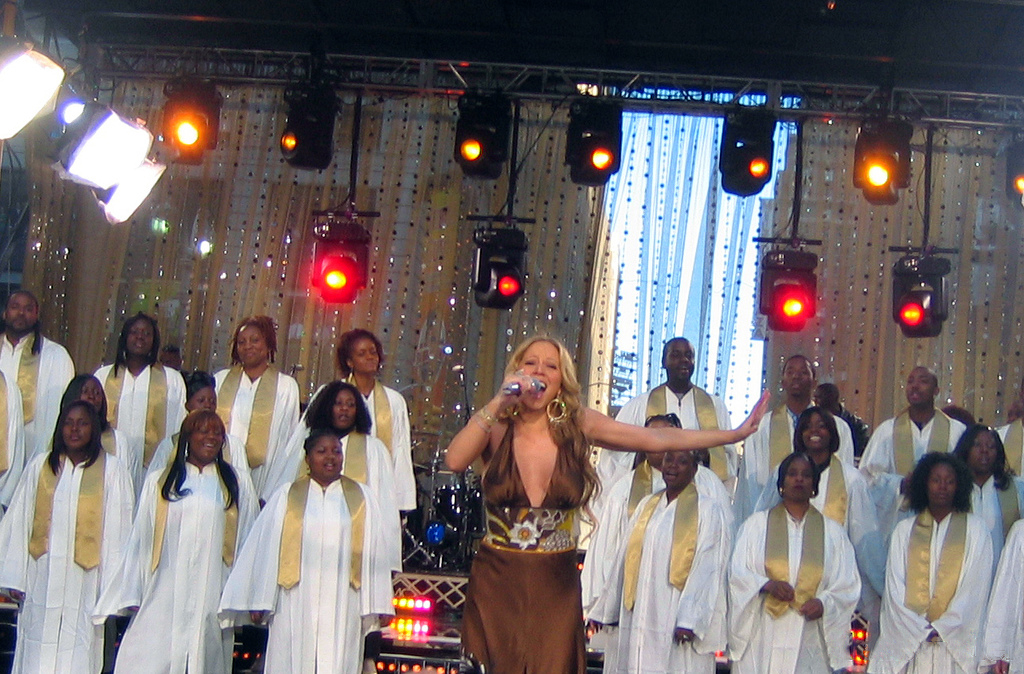
Carey performing "Fly Like a Bird" on Good Morning America

Following the European promotional tour for The Emancipation of Mimi, Carey launched the stateside release of the album on Good Morning America, in the form of an interview and five-piece outdoor concert. The concert, taking place in Times Square, and featuring the largest crowd in the plaza since the 2004 New Year's Eve celebration, Carey performed the first three singles from the album, as well as "Fly Like a Bird" and "Make It Happen" (1991). Months later, following the tragic events involving Hurricane Katrina in the Gulf Coast throughout August 2005, she was featured as a head-lining performer at the Shelter from the Storm: A Concert for the Gulf Coast concert charity benefit. Carey, wearing a non-formal ensemble of a pink tank-top and blue jeans, performed "Fly Like a Bird" alongside a large church choir. According to Nielsen Media Research, the special was viewed by over twenty-four million United States citizens, airing on over twelve different cable channels and in ninety-five countries.

Following the beginning of 2006, and the continued charting of the album, Carey was nominated for eight Grammy Awards, the most she had received in one night throughout her career. Due to the continued success of The Emancipation of Mimi, Carey decided to return to the Grammy stage for the 48th annual ceremony, held on February 8, 2006, for the first time since 1996. The performance opened with a pre-taped video of Carey discussing the importance of religion and God in her life, and how it helped her get through difficult times as a child and adult. Following the video, she appeared on stage wearing a white Chanel evening gown, and began with a shortened version of "We Belong Together". Following its completion, the spotlight focused on Carey's now-deceased pastor Clarence Keaton, who opened "Fly Like a Bird" with a passage from the Bible, also featured in the studio recording of the song. Midway through the song, a black temporary wall was removed, revealing a large choir, who joined Carey for the song's gospel climax. After completing her performance, "Fly Like a Bird" induced the night's only standing ovation, prompting Teri Hatcher, who was presenting the next award, to exclaim "It's like we've all just been saved."

Critics raved about Carey performance following the completion of the ceremony, with Jon Pareles from The New York Times saying "once she was worked up, she moaned, growled and swooped to the high and low extremes of her voice in "Fly Like a Bird". A writer from USA Today complimented her recital of both songs, writing "Carey certainly earned the right to savor the spotlight this year. But the diva made room for Walker's booming baritone in 'Bird', her fluttering homage to Minnie Ripperton." Gary Susman from Entertainment Weekly called Carey the "comeback queen" and wrote "Its what her voice did, soaring into the rafters like only Carey's can." Roger Friedman from Fox News outed the performance as "the number that sent the audience into a frenzy". On April 9, 2008, reality competition American Idol aired its second annual charity event, titled Idol Gives Back. Backed up by Randy Jackson on the bass, Carey appeared on stage as the last head-lining performer of the evening. Midway through the performance, a large church choir walked on stage in blue garbs, and provided the gospel climax for the song. Ann Powers from the Los Angeles Times called the song an "inspirational show-stopper" and felt Carey's vocal's were "patented impossible notes". In regards to the performance, Katie Byrne from MTV News wrote "Carey was at her over-the-top best, with a full gospel choir and the high notes that made her famous."

Aside from several televised performances, Carey included "Fly Like a Bird" on the set-lists of all her tours following its release. During Carey's The Adventures of Mimi Tour (2006) stop at Madison Square Garden, the song was dedicated to Ol' Dirty Bastard, who died in 2004 from an accidental drug overdose. The performance had to be re-done, as Carey's pastor, Clarence Keaton, missed his cue for the Biblical verses, and was forced to be found backstage and ushered to the spotlight. Four years later, Carey performed the song throughout her Angels Advocate Tour, only dedicating it to Keaton, who died on July 3, 2009. Editor and journalist Thomas Kintner from the Hartford Courant felt that during her live recital of "Fly Like a Bird", Carey "displayed power and sky-scraping pitch".

== Track listing ==
- US promo CD single
1. "Fly Like a Bird" – 3:53
2. "My Saving Grace" – 4:10

== Credits and personnel ==
Credits adapted from The Emancipation of Mimi liner notes.

- Vocals – Mariah Carey
- Songwriting – Mariah Carey, James "Big Jim" Wright
- Production – Mariah Carey, James "Big Jim" Wright
- Background vocals – Mariah Carey, Mary Ann Tatum, Melonie Daniels, Trey Lorenz, Sherry Tatum, Courtney Bradley, Rev. Dr. Clarence Keaton
- Engineers – Brian Garten, Dana Jon Chapelle
- Assistant engineer – Jason Finkel, Michael Leedy, Manuel Farolfi, Riccardo Durante
- Mixer – Phil Tan (mixed at Right Track Studios, NYC)
- Mastering – Herb Powers
- Additional keyboards – Loris Holland

== Charts ==
=== Weekly charts ===
Chart (2006)	Peak position
US Bubbling Under Hot 100 (Billboard)	4
US Radio Songs (Billboard)	66
US Hot R&B/Hip-Hop Songs (Billboard)	19
US Urban (Radio & Records)	34
US Urban AC (Radio & Records)	1

=== Year-end charts ===
Chart (2006)	Position
US Hot R&B/Hip-Hop Songs (Billboard)	39
US Adult R&B Songs (Billboard)	4

Chart (2007)	Position
US Adult R&B Songs (Billboard)	25
