= It's Like That (Mariah Carey song) =

2005 single by Mariah Carey

Single by Mariah Carey

from the album The Emancipation of Mimi
- B-side: "Sprung"
- Released: January 25, 2005
- Recorded: 2004
- Studio: Right Track (New York City); Southside (Atlanta, Georgia)
- Genre: Hip-hop; R&B
- Length: 3:23 (album version); 3:32 (official remix)
- Label: Island
- Composers: Mariah Carey; Jermaine Dupri; Manuel Seal
- Lyricists: Mariah Carey; Johntá Austin; Jermaine Dupri; Isaac Freeman
- Producers: Jermaine Dupri; Mariah Carey

Mariah Carey singles chronology
"U Make Me Wanna" (2004)	"It's Like That" (2005)	"We Belong Together" (2005)

Music video
- "It's Like That" on YouTube

"It's Like That" is a song by American singer Mariah Carey from her tenth studio album, The Emancipation of Mimi (2005). Written by Carey, Jermaine Dupri, Fatman Scoop, Manuel Seal, and Johntá Austin, and produced by Carey and Dupri, the song borrows the hook "It's Like That Y'all" from the Run–D.M.C. tracks "Hollis Crew" and "Here We Go (Live)". Several other tracks were contenders for the album's lead single. However, plans were changed when Island Def Jam Music head L.A. Reid suggested to Carey she record a few more strong songs to ensure the album's success, thus "It's Like That" was written and chosen as the album's lead single, being released on January 25, 2005.

"It's Like That" is an up-tempo R&B club song filled with elements of hip hop instrumentation that features ad-libs by Fatman Scoop and Dupri. The focus of the song's lyrics (and Carey's vocal performance) revolve around the notion of Carey leaving behind her worries by going for a night out at the club partying to unwind in addition to rejoicing in her newly acquired sense of liberation; with Carey's alter-ego, known as "Mimi," symbolizing the act of being emancipated in the process. The song received generally favorable reviews from music critics, most of whom noted its catchiness and carefree message. It was also nominated for a 2006 Grammy Award for Best Female Pop Vocal Performance. Commercially, the song charted well worldwide, becoming a top twenty hit in several countries, including the United States, while peaking inside the top-ten in over five other countries.

The song's accompanying music video, directed by Brett Ratner, was filmed as a two-part story with "We Belong Together". In the "It's Like That" video, Carey is shown at a masked party held at the home of her wealthy fiancé (played by Eric Roberts), who watches the party from upstairs but does not attend, when an ex-lover of hers (played by Wentworth Miller) appears. In the "We Belong Together" video, Carey and Robert's characters are getting ready to be married when Miller's character appears again, and Carey runs away with him. The song was heavily promoted by Carey in a number of places, including The Ellen DeGeneres Show, Good Morning America, BET, VH1 and more, while being performed on several of her concert tours.

== Background ==
In 2001, Carey released her debut film Glitter, which was met with an overwhelmingly negative response critically and commercially, followed by personal and professional struggles. Its accompanying soundtrack of the same name fared slightly better, spawning a top-five single in the United States and selling over three million units globally. After posting a personally expressive letter on her official site, Carey checked into a hospital in Connecticut because of an "emotional and physical breakdown". Following the events, Virgin Records bought out Carey's unprecedented $100 million USD recording contract. The company paid her $50 million to part ways. Carey flew to Capri, Italy, after her two-week hospitalization. During her five-month stay, she began to write a new studio album, using experiences she had gone through in recent months as inspirational themes.

After being signed by Island Records and starting her own imprint, MonarC Entertainment, Carey released her intended "comeback" album Charmbracelet (2002). However, the album failed to revive her career, receiving mixed reviews and failing to spawning a hit in the US, but sold considerably well. After enduring three years of "carping" from critics, Carey planned her return to music. On November 18, 2004, she revealed on her website that she would return to music and announced that the album would be called The Emancipation of Mimi, stating, "For the first time in my life, I feel free and unashamed to be who I really am," she wrote. "I am celebrating that I've grown into a person and artist who no longer feels imprisoned by my insecurities ... I can now honestly say, 'This is me, the real me, take it or leave it'."

== Release ==
Originally, "Stay the Night" was planned to be The Emancipation of Mimi's lead single, with an online music forum based in the United Kingdom, announcing that it would be in stores on October 11, 2004, in the region. A few weeks later, it was removed from the release schedule, later re-appearing with a different date, November 15, 2004. Later, it was revealed that "Say Somethin'", featuring Snoop Dogg, was supposed to be the album's first single, as reported by Jennifer Vineyard of MTV News, who also revealed that the song was originally supposed to go to radio by the end of November, but it was pushed back to January and would be accompanied by a video, according to Carey's label representative. However, both singles were not released as the first single.

Then, Island Records head L.A. Reid suggested Carey travel to Atlanta for a period of three days to work with Jermaine Dupri. When Reid heard the Dupri-helmed songs, Carey recalled, "He was like, 'Oh no! Now we've got to change the single, make these singles one and two'", and she agreed. "Nobody could tell me that 'Shake It Off' wasn't going to be my first single. It was my favorite song, just from the demo". Dupri had quickly sized up what he felt the album needed. "The records that I made are very melodic records, regardless of their hip-hop influence," Dupri said. "I think that's what she was missing." On January 7, 2005, "It's Like That" leaked online and it was rumoured to be the official first single. "It's Like That" aired first on Hot 97 in New York City; after the leak, over 40 stations begun playing the track. On January 15, 2005, Carey posted a sound clip of "It's Like That", on her official website. Ultimately, "It's Like That" was sent to mainstream and rhythmic radio on January 25, 2005.

== Composition and lyrics ==
"It's Like That" was written by Mariah Carey, Fatman Scoop, Jermaine Dupri, Manuel Seal and Johntá Austin, while Carey and Dupri produced the song, with additional co-production by Seal. The song also features Dupri and Fatman Scoop providing adlibs and rap in the intro and outro, respectively. It samples Run–D.M.C.'s hook "It's Like that Y'all" from their track "Hollis Crew" (1984). "It's Like That" is an up-tempo R&B and hip-hop club song which talks about Carey going out for the night at the club to relax and forget her troubles, refusing to give in to stress, strife and sadness. Sal Cinquemani of Slant Magazine went further, writing that in the song Carey arrives at the party "already shit-faced": "I came to have a party/Open off that Bacardi…Purple taking me higher/I'm lifted and I like it." As described by PopMatters's Jozen Cummings, "Hand claps and a playful whistle set the pulse for four bars. After Dupri’s ad-libs, the whistle drops out and allows Carey’s voice to lead the hand claps and throbbing bass, while the chorus spawns a chord progression with strings and piano."

During an interview for MTV, Mariah explained the meaning of the iconic lines, "Them chickens is ash and I'm lotion," stating: "We were sitting around basically having jokes. [...] We're like making up stupid stuff just to entertain ourselves at this point. Then Jermaine [Dupri] came back in the room and we're all sitting there going something about ash and lotion. We're not calling somebody ashy. We're actually saying, 'You are ash and we're lotion.' So basically, you are the antithesis of us. Basically I'm talking to the guy like, 'Them chickens is ash and I'm lotion. You need to get rid of them and I'm the antidote'."

== Critical reception ==
Professional ratings
Review scores
Source	Rating
The Irish Times	2/5 stars

The song received mostly favorable reviews from music critics. AllMusic's Stephen Thomas Erlewine picked the song as a highlight from The Emancipation of Mimi. Caroline Sullivan of The Guardian wrote a positive review for the song, praising the "headbanging Fatman Scoop rap", also noting that "Carey is very much a presence, unfurling her three octaves judiciously." Keith Caulfield from Billboard magazine assured that "Mariah Carey finally returns with a certifiably hot track. It's Like That is a sparse, bass-heavy, beat-driven cut that is primed for radio and dancefloors". Tom Sinclair of Entertainment Weekly described the song as "almost as cool as Run-DMC song (which shares the same title), with Carey fantasizing about easing into a nightclub buzzed on Bacardi. 'No stress, no fights,' she sings, making it sound like a trip to a vacation spa." Vibe editor Dimitri Enrlich wrote that the song is an "aggressive, off kilter joint with harshly stiff beat", pointing out that it was going to solidify comeback to her MTV crowd."

Daniel Incognito of Sputnikmusic wrote that the song "offers another example of Carey taking the entire workload, and pulling it off with variety and a delicate touch." Jozen Cummings of PopMatters wrote a very positive reception, commenting that the song "is the perfect introduction for the rest of the album’s carefree feel," stating that the song "is able to go from catchy to infectious status." Adam Webb of BBC Music wrote the track "successfully re-writes Christina Aguilera's career blueprint, that even a typically bull-in-a-china-shop contribution from Fatman Scoop can't ruin it." The New York Times editor Jon Pareles wrote a more mixed review, calling it "a come-on set to bare-bones electro from the producer Jermaine Dupri to stay contemporary, sometimes reducing her voice to the processed nasality of Britney Spears."

=== Accolades ===
In 2006, "It's Like That" received a nomination for a Best Female Pop Vocal Performance at the 48th Annual Grammy Awards, but lost to Kelly Clarkson's "Since U Been Gone". Raneisha Wilkinson of The Celebrity Cafe placed the song at number 5 among her "Top 10 Songs", calling it an enjoyable "catchy club banger song." Mark Graham of VH1 ranked the song at number 11 on her "43 Best Songs" list.

== Chart performance ==
"It's Like That" was one of Carey's biggest commercial successes in years, after an almost two-year absence from the charts, becoming her most successful single in the US since "Loverboy" (2001). On the US Billboard Hot 100 chart, the song debuted at number 53, becoming her highest-debuting Hot 100 song in almost five years. It eventually peaked at number 16, and stayed in the top forty for fifteen weeks, being ranked 69 on the Hot 100's "2005 year-end chart". It was certified gold by the RIAA, becoming Carey's first gold digital single.

The single was slightly more successful outside the US. In the United Kingdom, the song debuted at number 4, giving Carey her best charting-single since "Against All Odds (Take a Look at Me Now) (2000) with Westlife. In Australia, after debuting at number 9, "It's Like That" became Carey’s most successful single since "Loverboy", while in Italy, while peaking at number 7, it matched the peak position of "Through the Rain" (2002). In France, even with a peak of number 16, "It's Like That" was her most successful single since "Heartbreaker" (1999).

== Remixes ==
An official remix produced by Scott Storch has a more Middle Eastern flavor and a rap by Fat Joe. Dance remixes, with re-recorded vocals by Carey, were produced by David Morales. Peter Rauhofer and Pound Boys (a.k.a. Mayhem & Craig C.) also remixed "It's Like That", but their remixes were not released. Because many singles by 2005 did not have commercial CD single releases, the remixes were only released on twelve-inch vinyl maxi single. Two maxi singles were released.

== Music video ==
Carey initially wanted Paul Hunter to direct the music video. However, Brett Ratner, who directed some of Carey's other videos, was chosen instead. The main setting of the video, which was shot on location at Greystone Mansion in Beverly Hills, California on February 11, 2005, features a party at a mansion on the night before Carey's character's wedding to the owner of the mansion (Eric Roberts). Several guests are seen wearing masks, and there are celebrity cameo appearances by Brian McKnight, Randy Jackson, and the two featured rappers on the track, Dupri and Fatman Scoop. Carey is singing along to Fatman Scoop's outro rap when she sees a party guest (played by Wentworth Miller) taking off his mask and revealing himself to be an ex-lover of hers. The video ends on a cliffhanger, which leads to the video for the album's second single, "We Belong Together" (the two videos were filmed simultaneously).

== Formats and track listings ==
European and UK 2-track CD single; German 3-inch CD single

1. "It's Like That" – 3:25
2. "It's Like That" (David Morales Radio Mix) – 3:24

French limited edition enhanced CD single

1. "It's Like That" – 3:25
2. "Sprung" – 3:25
3. "It's Like That" (Video)

Australian, European and Thai CD maxi-single

1. "It's Like That" – 3:25
2. "It's Like That" (No Rap) – 3:04
3. "It's Like That" (David Morales Club Mix) – 8:27
4. "It's Like That" (David Morales Classic Mix) – 8:59
5. "It's Like That" (Stereo Experience) – 10:45

Japanese CD maxi-single

1. "It's Like That" – 3:24
2. "It's Like That" (No Rap) – 3:03
3. "It's Like That" (David Morales Radio Mix) – 3:25
4. "It's Like That" (David Morales Club Mix) – 8:26

UK 12-inch vinyl

A1. "It's Like That" – 3:24
A2. "It's Like That" (No Rap) – 3:03
B1. "It's Like That" (David Morales Club Remix) – 8:27

US 12-inch vinyl

A. "It's Like That" – 3:25
B. "It's Like That" (David Morales Club Mix) – 8:26
C. "It's Like That" (Instrumental) – 3:25

US 12-inch vinyl (Remixes by David Morales)

A. "It's Like That" (David Morales Club Mix) – 8:27
B. "It's Like That" (Stereo Experience) – 10:45

US 12-inch vinyl (Remix by Scott Storch)

A1. "It's Like That" – 3:23
A2. "It's Like That" (Instrumental) – 3:22
B1. "It's Like That" (Scott Storch Remix feat. Fat Joe) – 3:32
B2. "It's Like That" (Scott Storch Remix Instrumental) – 3:34

MC30 Remix EP

1. "It's Like That" – 3:23
2. "It's Like That" (No Rap) – 3:02
3. "It's Like That" (Instrumental) – 3:22
4. "It's Like That" (Scott Storch Remix feat. Fat Joe) – 3:32
5. "It's Like That" (Scott Storch Remix Instrumental) – 3:34
6. "It's Like That" (David Morales Classic Mix) – 8:58
7. "It's Like That" (David Morales Club Mix) – 8:26
8. "It's Like That" (David Morales Radio Mix) – 3:24
9. "It's Like That" (Stereo Experience) – 10:45

== Charts ==
=== Weekly charts ===
Chart (2005)	Peak position
Australia (ARIA)	9
Australia Club (ARIA)	15
Australian Urban (ARIA)	3
Austria (Ö3 Austria Top 40)	33
Belgium (Ultratop 50 Flanders)	29
Belgium (Ultratop 50 Wallonia)	32
Canada CHR/Pop (Radio & Records)	8
Denmark (Tracklisten)	19
Europe (European Hot 100 Singles)	8
France (SNEP)	16
Germany (GfK)	14
Greece (IFPI)	12
Hungary (Single Top 40)	3
Hungary (Dance Top 40)	15
Ireland (IRMA)	11
Italy (FIMI)	7
Japan (Oricon)	130
Netherlands (Dutch Top 40)	26
Netherlands (Single Top 100)	13
New Zealand (Recorded Music NZ)	21
Norway (VG-lista)	13
Romania (Romanian Top 100)	57
Russia Airplay (TopHit)	94
Scottish Singles Sales (Official Charts)	9
Sweden (Sverigetopplistan)	47
Switzerland (Schweizer Hitparade)	10
UK Singles (Official Charts)	4
UK Hip Hop/R&B (Official Charts)	2
UK Club (Music Week) David Morales/Stereo Experience mixes	2
UK Pop Club (Music Week) David Morales/Stereo Experience mixes	9
UK Urban Club (Music Week)	2
US Billboard Hot 100	16
US Dance Club Songs (Billboard) David Morales remixes	1
US Dance Airplay (Billboard)	10
US Dance Singles Sales (Billboard) David Morales remixes	1
US Hot R&B/Hip-Hop Songs (Billboard)	17
US Pop Airplay (Billboard)	16
US Pop 100 (Billboard)	20
US Rhythmic Airplay (Billboard)	9
US Top 40 Tracks (Billboard)	34
US CHR/Pop (Radio & Records)	17
US CHR/Rhythmic (Radio & Records)	9
US Urban (Radio & Records)	17

=== Year-end charts ===
Chart (2005)	Position
Australia (ARIA)	60
Australia Urban (ARIA)	24
Europe (European Hot 100 Singles)	97
Italy (Musica e dischi)	96
Switzerland (Schweizer Hitparade)	96
UK Singles (OCC)	71
UK Urban Club (Music Week)	11
US Billboard Hot 100	69
US Dance Singles Sales (Billboard) David Morales remixes	11
US Hot R&B/Hip-Hop Songs (Billboard)	78
US Mainstream Top 40 (Billboard)	84
US Pop 100 (Billboard)	65
US Rhythmic Airplay (Billboard)	46
US CHR/Pop (Radio & Records)	81
US CHR/Rhythmic (Radio & Records)	49
US Urban (Radio & Records)	81

== Certifications ==
Certifications and sales for "It's Like That"
Region	Certification	Certified units/sales
Australia (ARIA)	Gold	35,000^{^}
Brazil (Pro-Música Brasil)	Gold	30,000^{‡}
New Zealand (RMNZ)	Gold	15,000^{‡}
United Kingdom (BPI)	Silver	200,000^{‡}
United States (RIAA)	Platinum	1,000,000^{‡}
^{^} Shipments figures based on certification alone.^{‡} Sales+streaming figures based on certification alone.

== Release history ==
Release dates and formats for "It's Like That"
Region	Date	Format(s)	Label(s)	Ref.
United States	January 25, 2005	Digital download; contemporary hit radio; rhythmic contemporary radio	MonarC; Island Def Jam	
Austria	March 21, 2005	CD	Universal	
Germany	March 21, 2005	CD	Island	
Australia	March 28, 2005	CD	Universal Music Australia	
Italy	March 28, 2005	—	Def Jam	
Poland	March 28, 2005	CD	Universal Music Polska	
United Kingdom	March 28, 2005	12-inch vinyl; CD1; CD2	Mercury	
Japan	March 30, 2005	CD	Universal Music Japan	
United States	April 26, 2005	12-inch vinyl	Island Def Jam	
Various	January 29, 2021	EP	Def Jam	

== See also ==
- List of number-one dance singles of 2005 (U.S.)
