= List of songs recorded by Mariah Carey =

Songs by American singer-songwriter

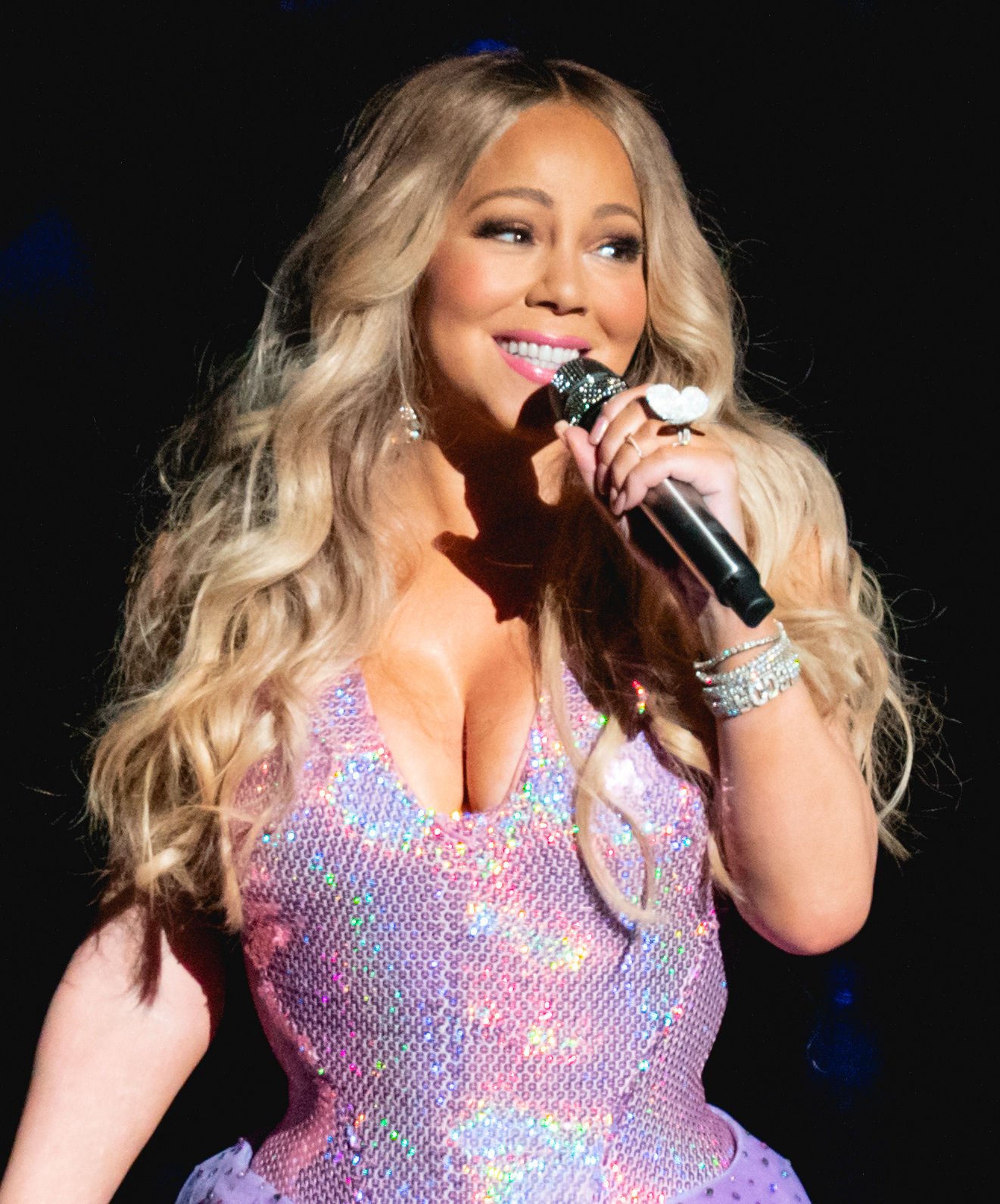
Carey during the Caution World Tour in 2019

American singer-songwriter Mariah Carey began her singing career working as a backing vocalist for American singer Brenda K. Starr before signing with Sony Music's Columbia Records in 1988. She went on to record numerous songs throughout her career for her own studio albums, various soundtracks, and has also contributed vocals to multiple charitable releases. Her debut single "Vision of Love" found success becoming her first number one song in the United States. She followed this with her eponymous debut album for which she co-wrote all of the ten songs with Ben Margulies and produced alongside Walter Afanasieff. She followed this with the albums Emotions (1991), Music Box (1993), Merry Christmas (1994), Daydream (1995), Butterfly (1997), Rainbow (1999), Glitter (2001), Charmbracelet (2002), The Emancipation of Mimi (2005), E=MC² (2008), Memoirs of an Imperfect Angel (2009), Merry Christmas II You (2010), Me. I Am Mariah... The Elusive Chanteuse (2014), Caution (2018), and Here for It All (2025).

Carey has received praise for co-writing and producing all of her original material. She has topped the US Billboard Hot 100 chart nineteen times – the most among soloists – with the songs "Vision of Love", "Love Takes Time", "Someday", "I Don't Wanna Cry", "Emotions", "I'll Be There", "Dreamlover", "Hero", "Fantasy", "One Sweet Day", "Always Be My Baby", "Honey", "My All", "Heartbreaker", "Thank God I Found You", "We Belong Together", "Don't Forget About Us", "Touch My Body" and "All I Want for Christmas Is You". She has also covered many songs throughout her career including "Open Arms" by Journey, "Without You" by Badfinger, "Against All Odds (Take a Look at Me Now)" by Phil Collins, "Bringin' On the Heartbreak" by Def Leppard, "I Want to Know What Love Is" by Foreigner, and "One More Try" by George Michael.

== Songs ==
Key
| # | Indicates songs recorded by Mariah Carey which are cover versions |
| • | Indicates songs recorded by Mariah Carey which contain partly or wholly re-recorded non-English lyrics |
| ‡ | Indicates remixes recorded by Mariah Carey which contain partly or wholly re-recorded vocals |

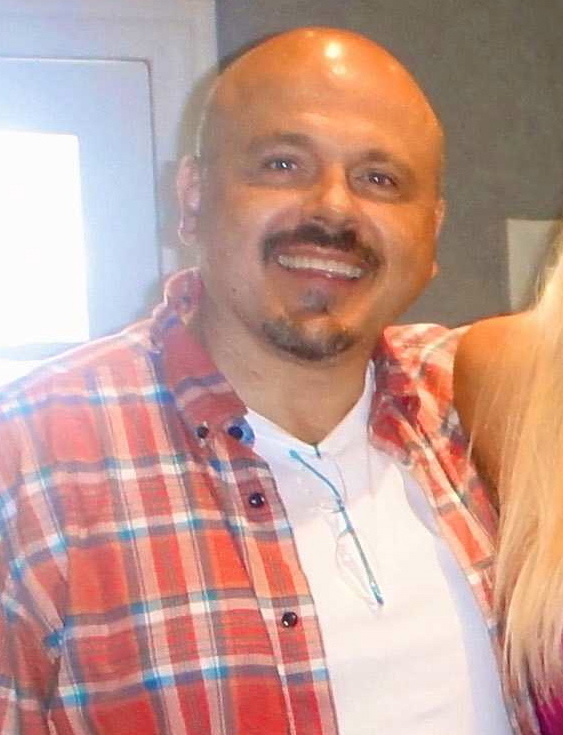
Carey collaborated with Walter Afanasieff on her first six studio albums.

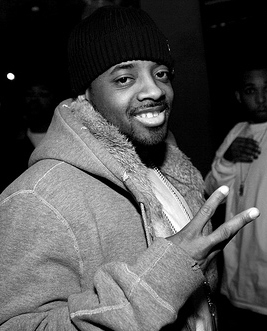
Carey has collaborated with Jermaine Dupri since the release of her fifth studio album Daydream in 1995.

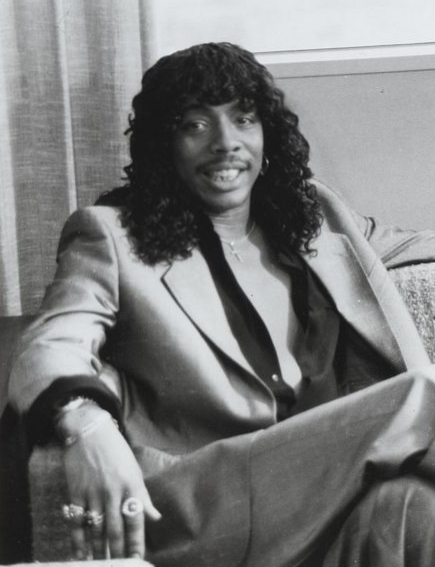
Carey sang "All My Life", written by Rick James, for her eighth studio album Glitter (2001).

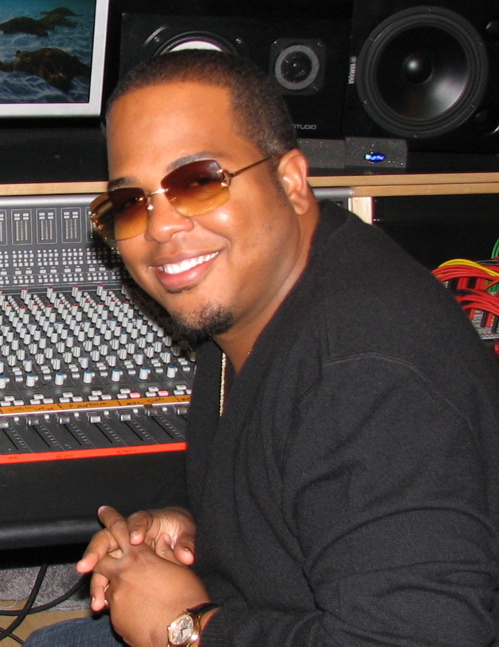
Tricky Stewart is one of Carey's frequent collaborators.

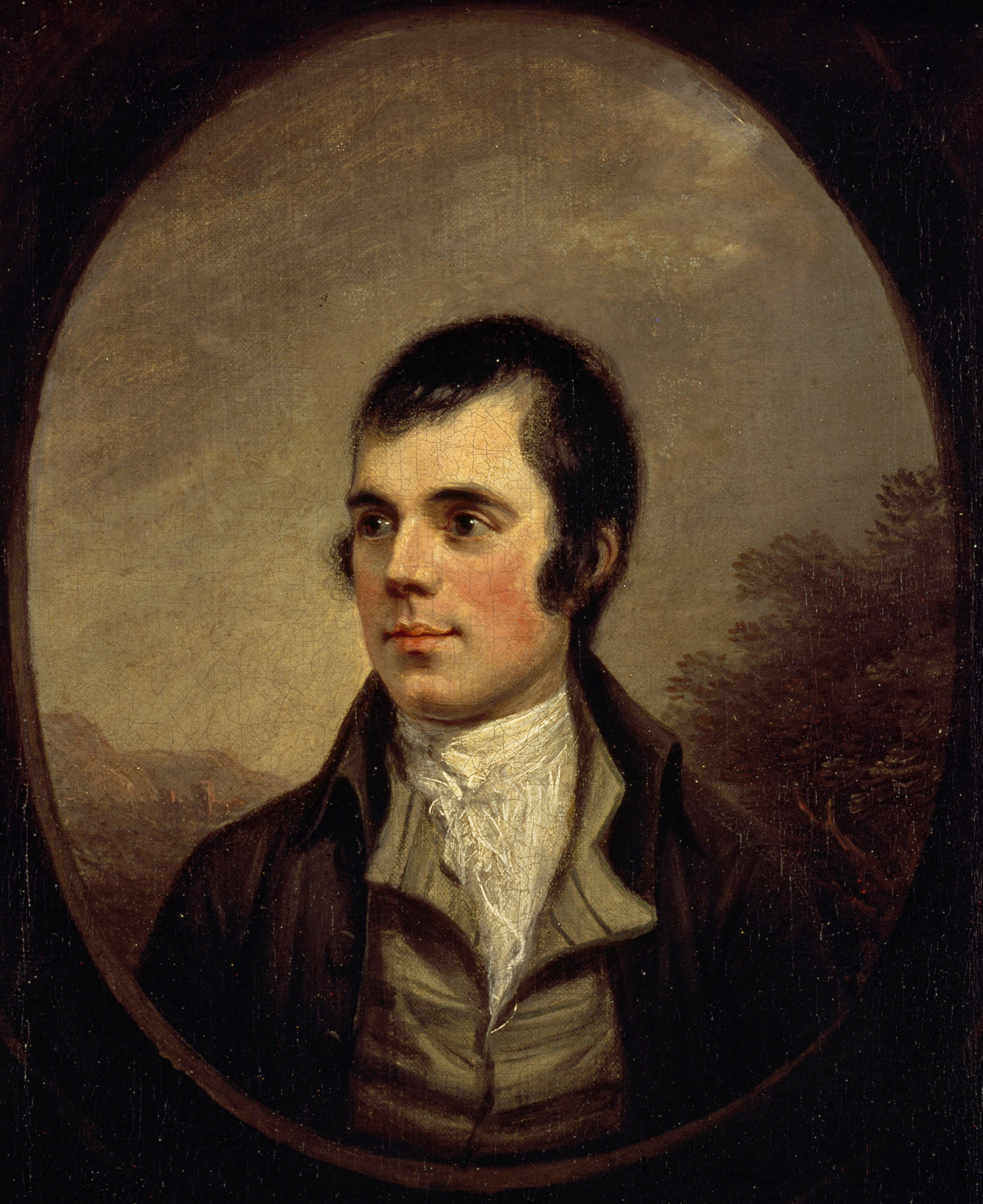
"Auld Lang Syne (The New Year's Anthem)" is a re-write of Robert Burns' 1788 poem "Auld Lang Syne".

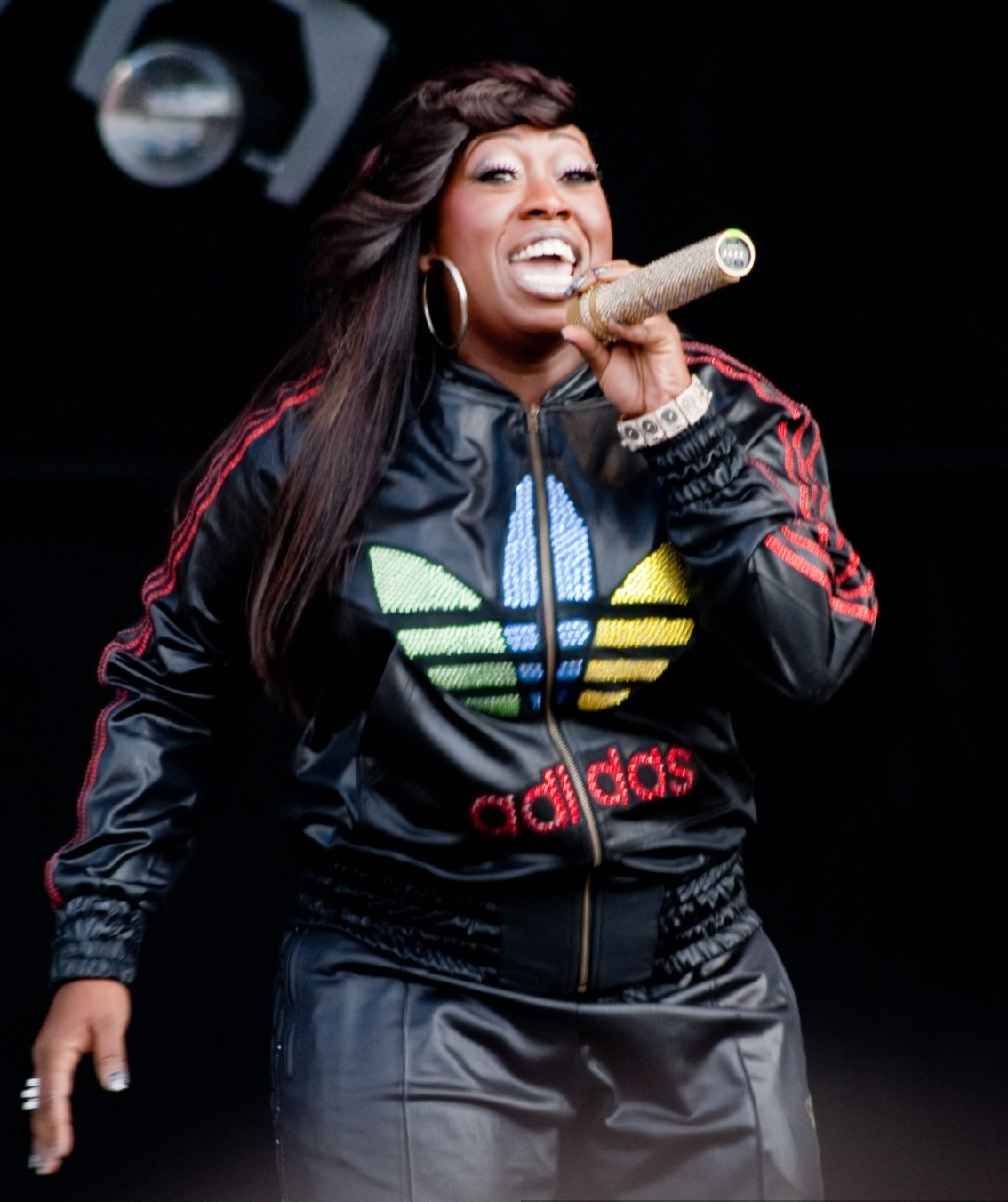
Carey co-wrote the lyrics of "Babydoll" with Missy Elliott.

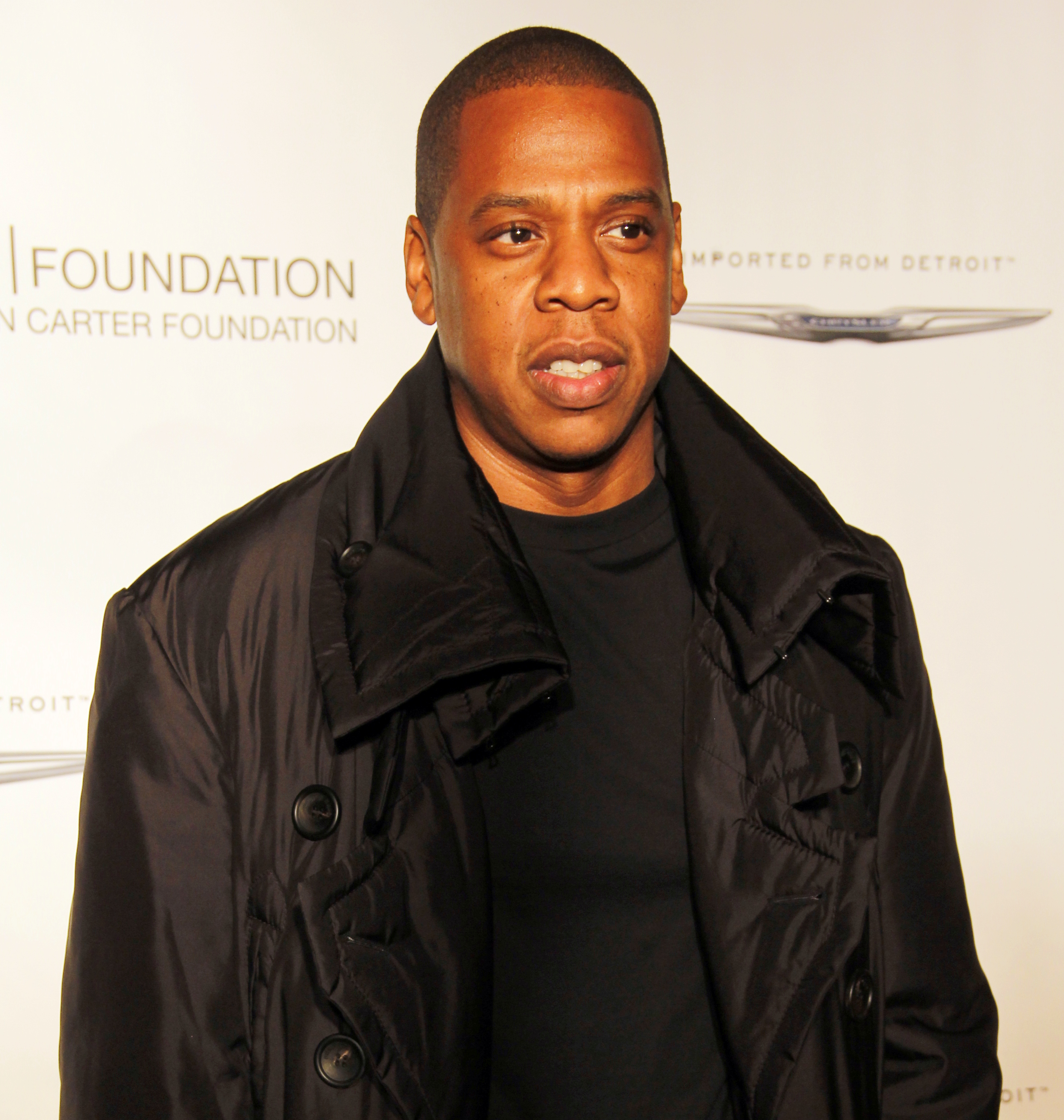
Carey has featured Jay-Z on "Heartbreaker", "You Got Me" and on the So So Def remix of "Bye Bye".

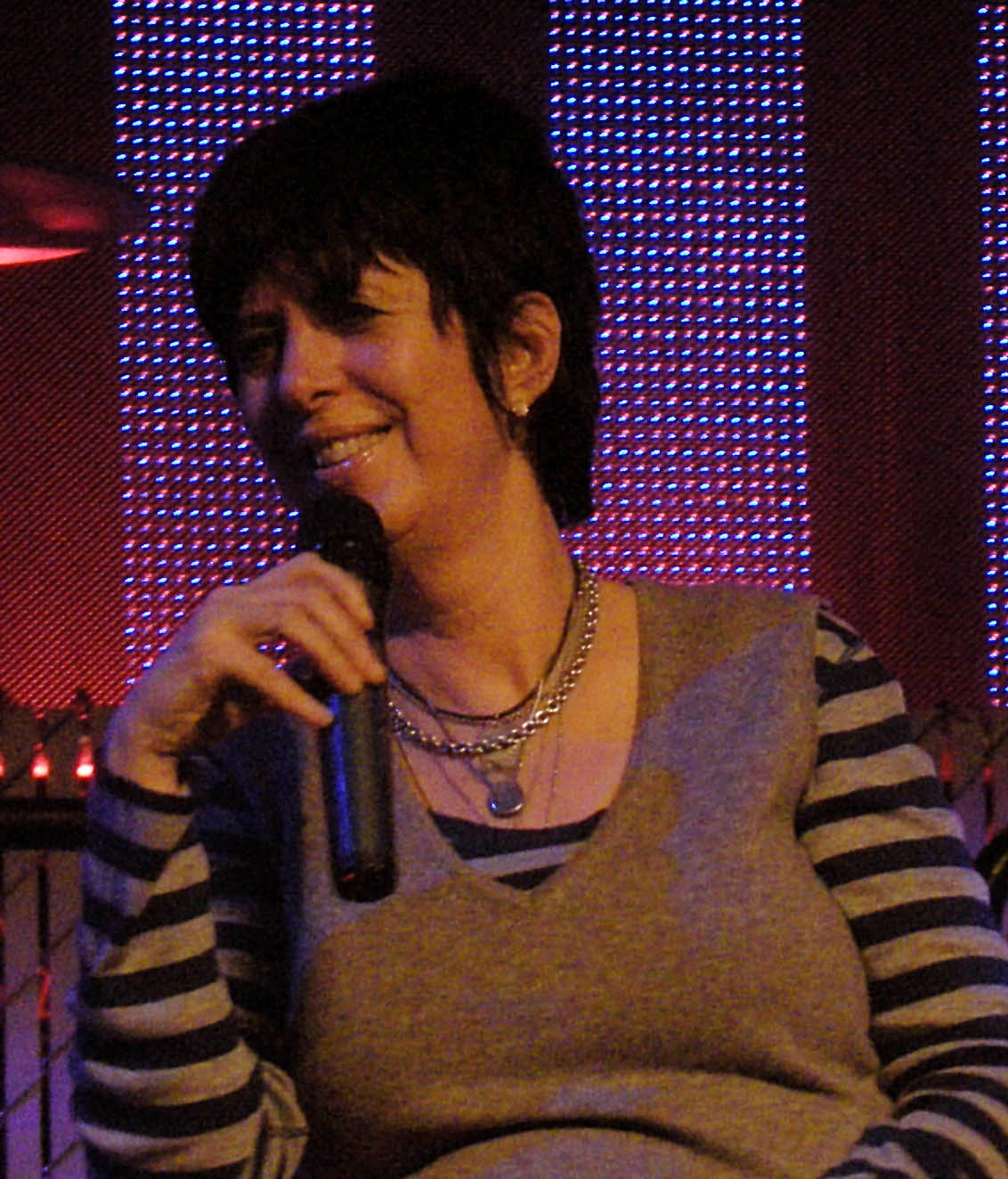
Carey co-wrote "Can't Take That Away (Mariah's Theme)", "After Tonight" and "There for Me" with Diane Warren.

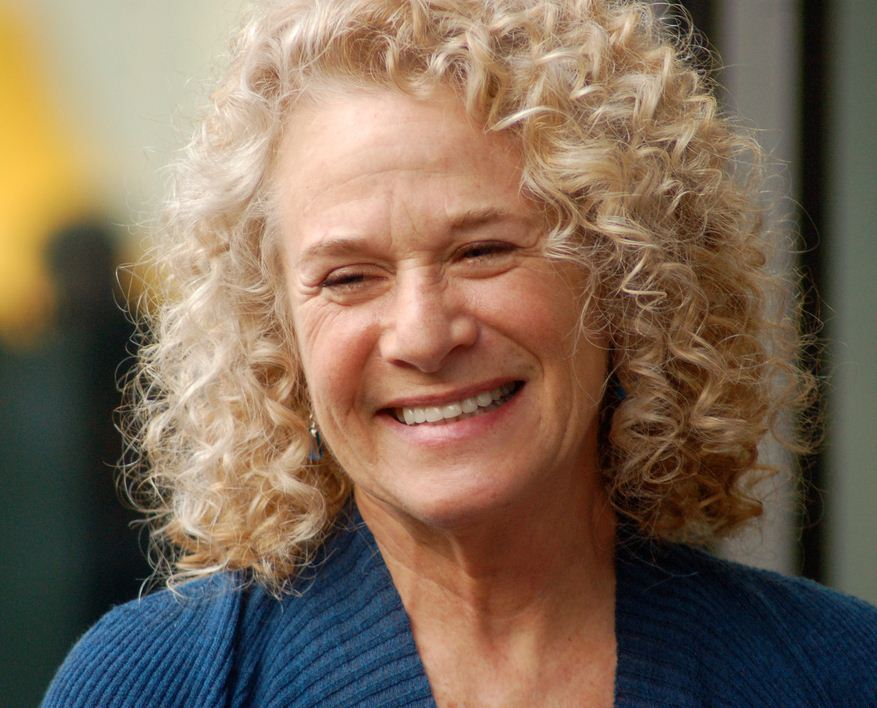
Carey co-wrote "If It's Over" with Carole King.

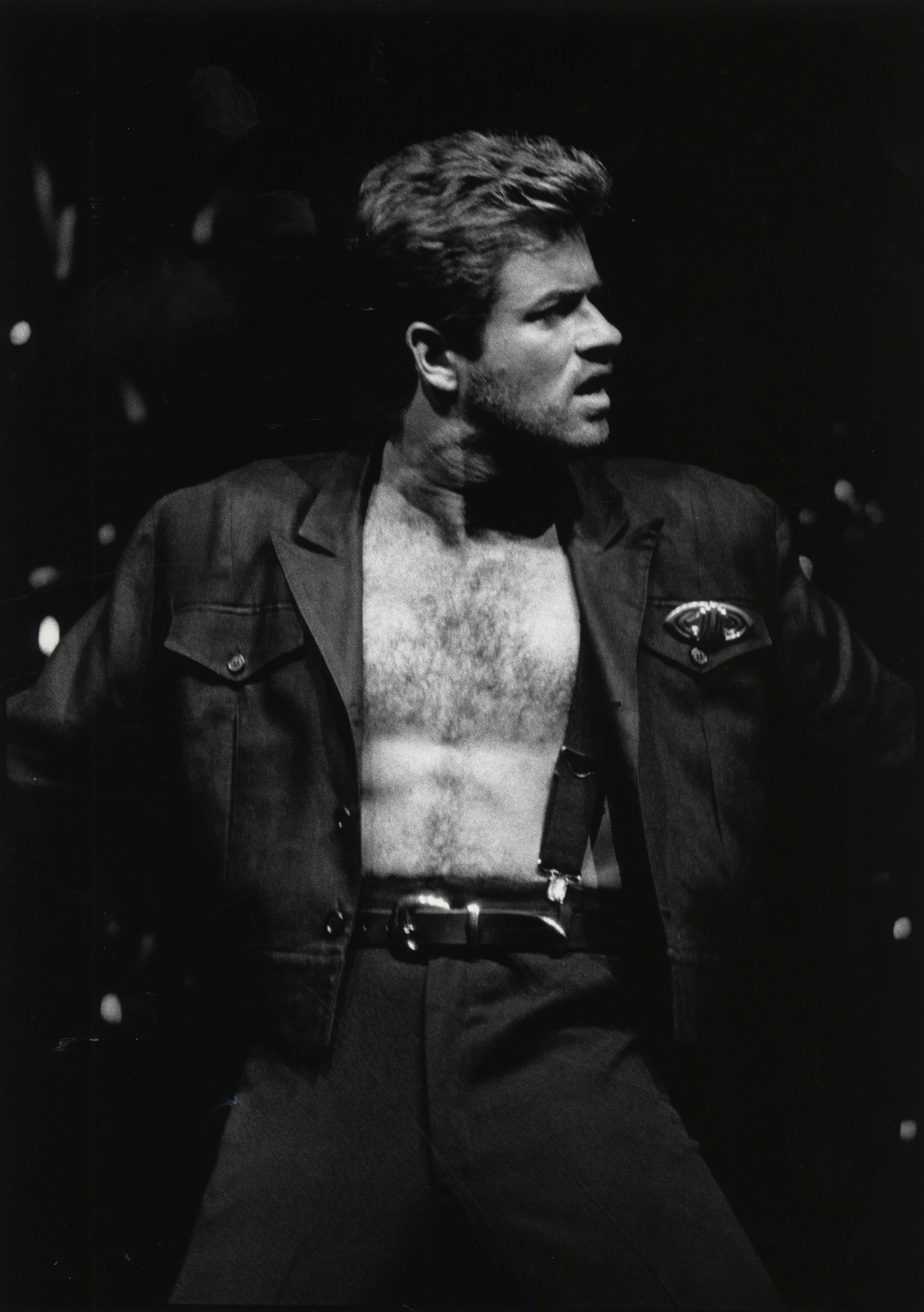
Carey recorded a cover of "One More Try" by George Michael.

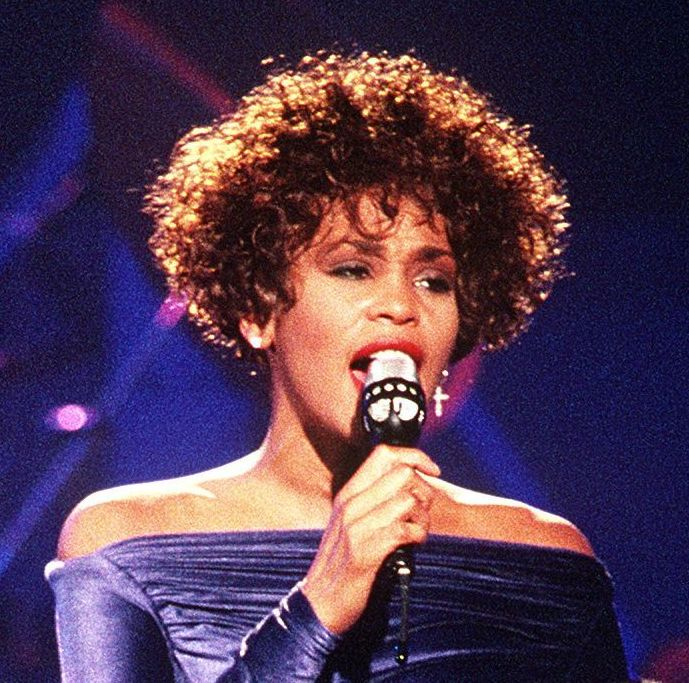
Carey recorded "When You Believe" as duet with Whitney Houston.

Name of song, lyrics writers/music writers, album, duration of song and year of release
| Song | Lyric writer(s) | Music writer(s) | Album | Length | Year | Ref. |
|---|---|---|---|---|---|---|
| "100%" | Mariah Carey; Jermaine Dupri | | AT&T Team USA Soundtrack | 4:12 | 2010 | |
| "4real4real" featuring Da Brat | Mariah Carey; Bryan-Michael Cox; Adonis Shropshire | | E=MC² | 4:13 | 2008 | |
| "8th Grade" | Mariah Carey; Timothy Mosley; Angel Lopez; Federico Vindver; Larrance Dopson; Jason Boyd | | Caution | 4:48 | 2018 | |
| "A No No" (Note: "A No No" contains a sample of the recording "Crush on You" performed by Lil' Kim and co-written by Lil' Kim with Andreao Heard, Christoper Wallace, James Lloyd and Jeff Lorber. "Crush on You" in turn contains a sample of the recording "Rain Dance" written by Lorber, who received a songwriter credit on it and "A No No", respectively.) | Mariah Carey; Robert Shea Taylor; Priscilla Hamilton; Mason Betha; Camron Giles; Kimberly Jones; Andreao Heard; Christopher Wallace; James Lloyd; Jeff Lorber | | Caution | 3:07 | 2018 | |
| "A No No" (Remix) (Note: "A No No" (Remix) featuring Shawni, like "A No No", contains a sample of the recording "Crush on You" performed by Lil' Kim and co-written by Lil' Kim with Andreao Heard, Christoper Wallace, James Lloyd and Jeff Lorber. "Crush on You" in turn contains a sample of the recording "Rain Dance" written by Lorber, who received a songwriter credit on it and "A No No", respectively. Additionally, the remix contains interpolations of the recording "Ex-Factor" written and performance by Lauryn Hill, which in turn contains a sample of "Can It Be All So Simple" written and performed by Wu-Tang Clan. "Can It Be All So Simple" also made use of a sample using the cover version of "The Way We Were" performed by Gladys Knight & the Pips and written by Alan Bergman, Marilyn Bergman, Marvin Hamlisch, Tom Jones and Harvey Schmidt.) ‡ featuring Shawni | Mariah Carey; Robert Shea Taylor; Priscilla Hamilton; Mason Betha; Camron Giles; Kimberly Jones; Andreao Heard; Christopher Wallace; James Lloyd; Jeff Lorber; Shawni; Lauryn Hill; Wu-Tang Clan | | —N/a | 3:38 | 2019 | |
| "After Tonight" | Mariah Carey; Diane Warren; David Foster | | Rainbow | 4:14 | 1999 | |
| "Against All Odds (Take a Look at Me Now)" # | Phil Collins | | Rainbow | 3:24 | 1999 | |
| "All I Live For" (Note: "All I Live For" was originally recorded in 1993 for Music Box and later included on The Rarities in 2020.) | Mariah Carey; Walter Afanasieff | | The Rarities | 5:25 | 2020 | |
| "All I Want for Christmas Is You" | Mariah Carey; Walter Afanasieff | | Merry Christmas | 4:01 | 1994 | |
| "All I Want for Christmas Is You - Extra Festive" | Mariah Carey; Walter Afanasieff | | Merry Christmas II You | 4:02 | 2010 | |
| "All I Want for Christmas Is You (SuperFestive!)" Justin Bieber featuring Mariah Carey | Mariah Carey; Walter Afanasieff | | Under the Mistletoe | 4:00 | 2011 | |
| "All I Want for Christmas Is You" (So So Def Remix) ‡ featuring Jermaine Dupri and Lil Bow Wow | Mariah Carey; Walter Afanasieff; Arthur Baker; John Robie; Soulsonic Force; Ralf Hütter; Florian Schneider | | Greatest Hits | 3:48 | 2001 | |
| "All I've Ever Wanted" | Mariah Carey | Mariah Carey; Walter Afanasieff | Music Box | 3:51 | 1993 | |
| "All in Your Mind" | Mariah Carey; Ben Margulies | | Mariah Carey | 4:44 | 1990 | |
| "All My Life" | Rick James | | Glitter | 5:09 | 2001 | |
| "Almost Home" | Mariah Carey; Simone Porter; Justin Gray; Lindsey Ray; Mikkel Storleer Eriksen; Tor Erik Hermansem | | —N/a | 3:48 | 2013 | |
| "Alone in Love" | Mariah Carey; Ben Margulies | | Mariah Carey | 4:12 | 1990 | |
| "Always Be My Baby" | Mariah Carey | Mariah Carey; Jermaine Dupri; Manuel Seal Jr. | Daydream | 4:18 | 1995 | |
| "Always Be My Baby" (Morales Always Club Mix) ‡ | Mariah Carey | Mariah Carey; Jermaine Dupri; Manuel Seal Jr. | The Ballads | 10:24 | 2008 | |
| "Always Be My Baby" (Mr. Dupri Mix) (Note: "Always Be My Baby" (Mr. Dupri Mix) contains a replay of the composition "Tell Me If You Still Care" performed by The S.O.S. Band and written by Jimmy Jam & Terry Lewis.)‡ featuring Da Brat and Xscape | Mariah Carey; Jimmy Jam & Terry Lewis | Mariah Carey; Jermaine Dupri; Manuel Seal Jr. Jimmy Jam & Terry Lewis | The Remixes | 4:40 | 2003 | |
| "America the Beautiful" # | Katharine Lee Bates; Samuel A. Ward | | Me. I Am Mariah... The Elusive Chanteuse | 1:58 | 2014 | |
| "And You Don't Remember" | Mariah Carey | Mariah Carey; Walter Afanasieff | Emotions | 4:26 | 1991 | |
| "Angel (The Prelude)" | Mariah Carey; Christopher Stewart; James Wright | | Memoirs of an Imperfect Angel | 1:04 | 2009 | |
| "Angels Cry" | Mariah Carey; Christopher Stewart; James Wright; Crystal Johnson | | Memoirs of an Imperfect Angel | 4:01 | 2009 | |
| "Anytime You Need a Friend" | Mariah Carey | Mariah Carey; Walter Afanasieff | Music Box | 4:26 | 1993 | |
| "Anytime You Need a Friend" (C+C Club Version) ‡ | Mariah Carey | Mariah Carey; Walter Afanasieff | The Remixes | 10:52 | 2003 | |
| "Auld Lang Syne (The New Year's Anthem)" (Note: "Auld Lang Syne (The New Year's Anthem)" is a re-write of the Scottish poem "Auld Lang Syne" written by Robert Burns, which is public domain.) | Robert Burns (Public Domain); Mariah Carey; Randy Jackson; Johnny "Sev" Severin (RedOne) | | Merry Christmas II You | 3:48 | 2010 | |
| "Babydoll" | Mariah Carey; Missy Elliott | Mariah Carey; Cory Rooney; Steven Jordan | Butterfly | 5:07 | 1997 | |
| "#Beautiful" featuring Miguel | Mariah Carey; Miguel Pimental; Nathan Perez; Brook "D’Leau" Davis; Mac Robinson; Brian Warfield | | Me. I Am Mariah... The Elusive Chanteuse | 3:21 | 2013 | |
| "#Beautiful" (Remix) ‡ featuring Miguel and Jeezy | Mariah Carey; Miguel Pimental; Nathan Perez; Brook "D’Leau" Davis; Mac Robinson; Brian Warfield; Jay Jenkins | | —N/a | 3:23 | 2013 | |
| "The Beautiful Ones" # featuring Dru Hill | Prince | | Butterfly | 6:59 | 1997 | |
| "Betcha Gon' Know (The Prologue)" | Mariah Carey; Christopher Stewart; Terius Nash; James Wright | | Memoirs of an Imperfect Angel | 4:00 | 2009 | |
| "Bliss" | Mariah Carey; James Wright; Jimmy Jam & Terry Lewis | | Rainbow | 5:43 | 1999 | |
| "Boy (I Need You)" featuring Cam'ron | Mariah Carey; Justin Smith; Norman Whitfield | | Charmbracelet | 5:14 | 2002 | |
| "Breakdown" featuring Bone Thugs-n-Harmony | Mariah Carey; Anthony Henderson; Charles Scruggs | Mariah Carey; Steven Jordan | Butterfly | 4:44 | 1997 | |
| "Bringin' On the Heartbreak" # | Steven Maynard Clark; Peter Andrew Willis; Joe Elliott | | Charmbracelet | 4:34 | 2002 | |
| "Butterfly" | Mariah Carey | Mariah Carey; Walter Afanasieff | Butterfly | 4:35 | 1997 | |
| "Bye Bye" | Mariah Carey; Johntá Austin; Mikkel Storleer Eriksen; Tor Erik Hermansem | | E=MC² | 4:26 | 2008 | |
| "Bye Bye" (So So Def Remix) ‡ featuring Jay-Z | Mariah Carey; Johntá Austin; Shawn Carter; Mikkel Storleer Eriksen; Tor Erik Hermansem | | —N/a | 3:53 | 2008 | |
| "Camouflage" | Mariah Carey; James Wright | | Me. I Am Mariah... The Elusive Chanteuse | 4:49 | 2014 | |
| "Can You Hear Me" (Note: "Can You Hear Me" was originally recorded in 1991 for Emotions and later included on The Rarities in 2020.) | Mariah Carey; Barry Mann | | The Rarities | 4:06 | 2020 | |
| "Candy Bling" (Note: "Candy Bling" contains a sample of the recording "Back in the Day" performed by Ahmad and written by Ahmad, Stefan Gordy and John Klemmer.) | Mariah Carey; Terius Nash; Carlos McKinney; Ahmad Lewis; Stefan Gordy; John Klemmer | | Memoirs of an Imperfect Angel | 4:03 | 2009 | |
| "Can't Let Go" | Mariah Carey | Mariah Carey; Walter Afanasieff | Emotions | 4:27 | 1991 | |
| "Can't Say No" (Note: "Can't Say No" contains a sample of Carey's own recording "Can't Let Go" written by herself and Walter Afanasieff. Carey also features on the track, providing a 2015 vocal for the parts sampled.) Rick Ross featuring Mariah Carey | Mariah Carey; William Roberts II; J.R. Rotem; Walter Afanasieff | | Black Market | 3:30 | 2015 | |
| "Can't Take That Away (Mariah's Theme)" | Mariah Carey; Diane Warren | | Rainbow | 4:32 | 1999 | |
| "Can't Take That Away (Mariah's Theme)" (Morales Revival Triumphant Mix) ‡ | Mariah Carey; Diane Warren; David Morales | | —N/a | 10:26 | 1999 | |
| "Caution" | Mariah Carey; Ernest Wilson; Mohamed Sulaiman; Luca Polizzi; Charles Henshaw | | Caution | 3:15 | 2018 | |
| "Charlie Brown Christmas" # | Vince Guaraldi; Lee Mendelson | | Merry Christmas II You | 2:49 | 2010 | |
| "Christmas (Baby Please Come Home)" # | Ellie Greenwich; Jeff Barry; Phil Spector | | Merry Christmas | 2:26 | 1994 | |
| "Christmas Time Is in the Air Again" | Mariah Carey; Marc Shaiman | | Merry Christmas II You | 3:02 | 2010 | |
| "Circles" | Mariah Carey; James Wright | | The Emancipation of Mimi | 3:30 | 2005 | |
| "Close My Eyes" | Mariah Carey | Mariah Carey; Walter Afanasieff | Butterfly | 4:21 | 1997 | |
| "Clown" | Mariah Carey; Vidal Davis & Andre Harris; Mary Ann Tatum | | Charmbracelet | 3:17 | 2002 | |
| "Cool on You" (Note: "Cool on You" was originally recorded in 2007 for E=MC² and later included on The Rarities in 2020.) | Mariah Carey; Jermaine Dupri; Manuel Seal; Johntá Austin | | The Rarities | 3:11 | 2020 | |
| "Cruise Control" featuring Damian Marley | Mariah Carey; Jermaine Dupri; Manuel Seal; Johntá Austin; Damian Marley | | E=MC² | 3:32 | 2008 | |
| "Cry." | Mariah Carey; James Wright | | Me. I Am Mariah... The Elusive Chanteuse | 4:51 | 2014 | |
| "Crybaby" featuring Snoop Dogg | Mariah Carey; Howie Hersh; Calvin Broadus; Trey Lorenz; Timothy Gatlin; Gene Griffin; Aaron Hall III; Teddy Riley | | Rainbow | 5:19 | 1999 | |
| "Daydream Interlude" (Fantasy Sweet Dub Mix) | Mariah Carey; Chris Frantz; Tina Weymouth | Mariah Carey; Adrian Belew; Chris Frantz; Dave Hall; Steven Stanley; Tina Weymouth | Daydream | 3:04 | 1995 | |
| "Dedicated" (Note: "Dedicated" contains a sample of the recording "Da Mystery of Chessboxin'" written and performed by the Wu-Tang Clan.) featuring Nas | Mariah Carey; Chauncey Hollis; James Fauntleroy; Nasir Jones; Dennis Coles; Robert Diggs; Gary Grice; Lamont Hawkins; Jason Hunter; Russell Jones; Clifford Smith; Corey Woods | | Me. I Am Mariah... The Elusive Chanteuse | 4:17 | 2014 | |
| "Did I Do That?" featuring Mystikal and Master P | Mariah Carey; Craig Bazile; Tracey Waples; Joseph Smokey Johnson; Wardell Joseph Quezergue | | Rainbow | 4:14 | 1999 | |
| "Didn't Mean to Turn You On" # | Jimmy Jam & Terry Lewis | | Glitter | 4:54 | 2001 | |
| "Do You Know Where You're Going To (Theme from Mahogany)" # | Gerry Goffin; Michael Masser | | #1's | 3:47 | 1998 | |
| "Do You Think of Me" | Mariah Carey; Walter Afanasieff; Mark C. Rooney; Mark Morales | | B-side to "Dreamlover" | 4:46 | 1993 | |
| "Don't Forget About Us" | Mariah Carey; Jermaine Dupri; Manuel Seal; Johntá Austin | | The Emancipation of Mimi | 3:53 | 2005 | |
| "Don't Forget About Us Part 2" (Desert Storm Remix) ‡ with DJ Clue? featuring Fabolous and Styles P | Mariah Carey; Jermaine Dupri; Manuel Seal; Johntá Austin; DJ Clue? John Jackson; David Styles | | Fidel Cashflow 2006 | 4:40 | 2006 | |
| "Don't Stop (Funkin' 4 Jamaica)" featuring Mystikal | Mariah Carey; DJ Clue? Duro; Thomas Brown; Toni Smith; Michael Tyler | | Glitter | 3:37 | 2001 | |
| "Dreamlover" (Note: "Dreamlover" and "Dreamlover" (Morales Def Club Mix) contain a sample of the recording "Blind Alley" performed by The Emotions and written by David Porter.) | Mariah Carey | Mariah Carey; Dave Hall | Music Box | 3:54 | 1993 | |
| "Dreamlover" (Morales Def Club Mix) ‡ | Mariah Carey | Mariah Carey; Dave Hall | The Remixes | 10:45 | 2003 | |
| "El Amor Que Soñé" • (Note: "El Amor Que Soñé" is a Spanish language version of Carey's cover of "Open Arms") | Mariah Carey; Manny Benito | Mariah Carey; Walter Afanasieff | Daydream | 3:32 | 1995 | |
| "Emotions" | Mariah Carey | Mariah Carey; David Cole; Robert Clivillés | Emotions | 4:09 | 1991 | |
| "Emotions" (12" Club Mix) | Mariah Carey | Mariah Carey; David Cole; Robert Clivillés | The Remixes | 5:49 | 2003 | |
| "Endless Love" # with Luther Vandross | Lionel Richie | | Songs | 4:21 | 1994 | |
| "Every Time I Close My Eyes" Babyface featuring background vocals by Mariah Carey | Babyface | | The Day and The Moment | 4:58 | 1996 | |
| "Everybody Hurts" with Helping Haiti artists | Bill Berry; Michael Stipe; Mike Mills; Peter Buck | | —N/a | 5:24 | 2010 | |
| "Everything Fades Away" | Mariah Carey | Mariah Carey; Walter Afanasieff | Music Box | 5:25 | 1993 | |
| "Faded" | Mariah Carey; Mike Williams; Denisia "Blu June" Andrews | | Me. I Am Mariah... The Elusive Chanteuse | 3:41 | 2014 | |
| "Fall in Love at Christmas" with Khalid and Kirk Franklin | Mariah Carey; Khalid Robinson; Kirk Franklin; Daniel Moore II | | Mariah's Christmas: The Magic Continues... | 5:08 | 2021 | |
| "Fantasy" (Note: "Fantasy" and its remixes contain a sample of the recording "Genius of Love" performed by the Tom Tom Club and written by Adrian Belew, Chris Frantz, Steven Stanley and Tina Weymouth.) | Mariah Carey; Chris Frantz; Tina Weymouth | Mariah Carey; Adrian Belew; Chris Frantz; Dave Hall; Steven Stanley; Tina Weymouth | Daydream | 4:04 | 1995 | |
| "Fantasy" (Bad Boy Remix) featuring Ol' Dirty Bastard | Mariah Carey; Chris Frantz; Tina Weymouth; Russell Jones | Mariah Carey; Adrian Belew; Chris Frantz; Dave Hall; Steven Stanley; Tina Weymouth | The Remixes | 4:52 | 2003 | |
| "Fantasy" (Def Club Mix) | Mariah Carey; Chris Frantz; Tina Weymouth | Mariah Carey; Adrian Belew; Chris Frantz; Dave Hall; Steven Stanley; Tina Weymouth | The Remixes | 11:14 | 2003 | |
| "The First Noel"/"Born Is the King (Interlude)" # | Traditional (Public Domain) | | Merry Christmas II You | 4:33 | 2010 | |
| "Fly Away" (Butterfly Reprise) | Mariah Carey; Bernie Taupin; Elton John; David Morales | Mariah Carey; David Morales | Butterfly | 3:49 | 1997 | |
| "Fly Away" (Butterfly Reprise) (Fly Away Club Mix) | Mariah Carey; Bernie Taupin; Elton John; David Morales | Mariah Carey; David Morales | The Remixes | 9:50 | 2003 | |
| "Fly Like a Bird" | Mariah Carey; James Wright | | The Emancipation of Mimi | 3:53 | 2005 | |
| "For the Record" | Mariah Carey; Bryan-Michael Cox; Adonis Shropshire | | E=MC² | 3:26 | 2008 | |
| "Forever" | Mariah Carey | Mariah Carey; Walter Afanasieff | Daydream | 4:00 | 1995 | |
| "Fourth of July" | Mariah Carey | Mariah Carey; Walter Afanasieff | Butterfly | 4:22 | 1997 | |
| "Get Your Number" (Note: "Get Your Number" contains a sample of the recording "Just an Illusion" performed by Imagination and written by John Phillips, Steve Jolley, Tony Swain, Ashley Ingram and Leee John.) featuring Jermaine Dupri | Mariah Carey; Jermaine Dupri; Johntá Austin; John Phillips; Steve Jolley and Tony Swain; Ashley Ingram; Leee John | | The Emancipation of Mimi | 3:15 | 2005 | |
| "Givin' Me Life" featuring Slick Rick and Blood Orange | Mariah Carey; Devonté Hynes; Ricky M.L. Walters | | Caution | 6:08 | 2018 | |
| "God Rest Ye Merry, Gentlemen" # | Traditional | | Merry Christmas | 1:18 | 1994 | |
| "Got a Thing 4 You" with Da Brat featuring Elephant Man | Mariah Carey; Robert Caldwell; Da Brat; L.T. Hutton; Alfons Kettner | | Charmbracelet | 5:02 | 2002 | |
| "GTFO" | Mariah Carey; Paul Jeffries; Jordan Manswell; Bibi Bourelly; Porter Robinson | | Caution | 3:27 | 2018 | |
| "Hark! The Herald Angels Sing"/"Gloria (In Excelsis Deo)" # | Traditional; Felix Mendelssohn (adapted by William H. Cummings) | | Merry Christmas | 3:00 | 1994 | |
| "H.A.T.E.U." | Mariah Carey; Christopher Stewart; Terius Nash | | Memoirs of an Imperfect Angel | 4:27 | 2009 | |
| "H.A.T.E.U." (So So Def Remix) (Note: "H.A.T.E.U." (So So Def Remix) contains a sample of the recording "My Boo" written by Carlton Mahone, Rodney Terry and Jonathan Smith, and performed by Ghost Town DJ's.) ‡ featuring OJ da Juiceman, Gucci Mane and Big Boi | Mariah Carey; Christopher Stewart; Terius Nash; Otis Williams Jr. Radric Davis; Antwan André Patton; Carlton Mahone; Rodney Terry; Jonathan Smith | | —N/a | 3:00 | 2009 | |
| "Heartbreaker" featuring Jay-Z | Mariah Carey; Shawn Carter; Shirley Ellis; Lincoln Chase; Narada Michael Walden; Jeffrey Cohen | | Rainbow | 4:45 | 1999 | |
| "Heartbreaker" (So So Def Remix) ‡ featuring Da Brat and Missy Elliott | Mariah Carey; Da Brat; Missy Elliott; Ricardo Emanuel Brown; Calvin Broadus; Warren Griffin III; Andre Romell Young; Nathaniel Hale | | Rainbow | 4:32 | 1999 | |
| "Heartbreaker/If You Should Ever Be Lonely" (Junior's Heartbreaker Club Mix) (Note: "Heartbreaker/If You Should Ever Be Lonely" (Junior's Heartbreaker Club Mix) contains interpolations of the recording "If You Should Ever Be Lonely" performed by Val Young and written by Val Young and Frederick Jenkins.) ‡ | Mariah Carey; Val Young Andrews; Frederick Jenkins | | The Remixes | 10:18 | 2003 | |
| "Heat" | Mariah Carey; C. Johnson; William James Adams; Keith Harris; J. Hutchins, J. Fletcher; L. Smith; R. Muller | | E=MC² | 3:34 | 2008 | |
| "Heavenly (No Ways Tired/Can't Give Up Now)" (Note: "Heavenly (No Ways Tired/Can't Give Up Now)" is dedicated to the late Reverend James Cleveland. It contains an excerpt from the Reverend's sermon "God's Promise". It also contains three samples: "Can't Give Up Now" performed by Mary Mary, "Good Ole Music" performed by Funkadelic and "I Don't Feel No Ways Tired" also by Cleveland.) | Mariah Carey; Curtis Burrell; George Clinton Jr. | | Me. I Am Mariah... The Elusive Chanteuse | 5:38 | 2014 | |
| "Here Comes Santa Claus (Right Down Santa Claus Lane)"/"Housetop Celebration" # | Gene Autry; Oakley Haldeman; Benjamin Hanby (Public Domain) | | Merry Christmas II You | 3:28 | 2010 | |
| "Here We Go Round Again" (Note: "Here We Go Round Again" was originally recorded in 1990 for Mariah Carey and later included on The Rarities in 2020.) | Mariah Carey; Ben Margulies | | The Rarities | 3:55 | 2020 | |
| "#Hermosa" (Spanglish Version) • (Note: "#Hermosa" is a Spanglish version of "#Beautiful".) featuring Miguel | Mariah Carey; Brook Davis; Nathan Perez; Miguel Pimentel | | —N/a | 3:22 | 2013 | |
| "Hero" | Mariah Carey | Mariah Carey; Walter Afanasieff | Music Box | 4:19 | 1993 | |
| "Héroe" • (Note: "Heroe" is a Spanish language version of Carey's song "Hero") | Mariah Carey | Mariah Carey; Walter Afanasieff | Music Box | 4:19 | 1993 | |
| "Honey" (Note: "Honey" contains a sample of the recording "The Body Rock" performed by the Treacherous Three and published by Bobby Robinson. It also contains a replay of the composition "Hey DJ" performed by The World's Famous Supreme Team and written by Larry Price and Malcolm McLaren.) | Mariah Carey | Mariah Carey; Bobby Robinson; Kamaal Fareed; Larry Price; Malcolm McLaren; Sean Combs; Stephen Hague; Steven Jordan | Butterfly | 5:00 | 1997 | |
| "Honey" (Classic Mix) (Note: "Honey (Classic Mix)" and its variation "Honey (Def Club Mix)" contain a sample of the recording "The Body Rock" performed by the Treacherous Three and published by Bobby Robinson.) ‡ | Mariah Carey; David Morales; Bobby Robinson; M. Dewese | | The Remixes | 8:06 | 2003 | |
| "Honey" (Def Club Mix) | Mariah Carey | Mariah Carey; Bobby Robinson | Butterfly | 6:17 | 1997 | |
| "Honey" (So So Def Radio Mix) (Note: "Honey (So So Def Radio Mix)" contains a sample of the recording "It's Great to Be Here" performed by The Jackson 5 and written by Freddie Perren, Alphonzo Mizell, Berry Gordy and Dennis Lussier.) ‡ featuring Da Brat and JD | Mariah Carey | Mariah Carey; Bobby Robinson; Larry Price; Malcolm McLaren; Freddie Perren; Alphonzo Mizell; Berry Gordy; Dennis Lussier | Butterfly | 3:59 | 1997 | |
| "How Much" (Note: "How Much" contains portions of the recording "Me and My Girlfriend" performed by Tupac Shakur and written by Shakur, Darryl Harper, Tyrone Wrice and Ricky Rouse.) featuring Usher | Mariah Carey; Jermaine Dupri; Bryan-Michael Cox; Tupac Shakur; Darryl Harper; Tyrone Wrice; Ricky Rouse | | Rainbow | 3:30 | 1999 | |
| "I Am Free" | Mariah Carey | Mariah Carey; Walter Afanasieff | Daydream | 3:09 | 1995 | |
| "I Don't" (Note: "I Don't" contains a sample of the recording "Where I Wanna Be" performed by Donell Jones and written by Jones and Kyle West.) featuring YG | Mariah Carey; Keenon Jackson; Donell Jones; Kyle West | | —N/a | 4:16 | 2017 | |
| "I Don't Wanna Cry" | Mariah Carey; Narada Michael Walden | | Mariah Carey | 4:48 | 1990 | |
| "I Know What You Want" with Busta Rhymes featuring the Flipmode Squad | Trevor Smith; Rashia Fisher; Roger McNair; Ricardo Thomas; W. Lewis; L. Jones | | Charmbracelet | 5:27 | 2003 | |
| "I Only Wanted" | Mariah Carey; Lionel Cole | | Charmbracelet | 3:38 | 2002 | |
| "I Pray" (Note: "I Pray" was originally recorded in 2005 and later included on The Rarities in 2020.) | Mariah Carey; Keith Crouch | | The Rarities | 2:53 | 2020 | |
| "I Stay in Love" | Mariah Carey; Bryan-Michael Cox; Adonis Shropshire; Kendrick Dean | | E=MC² | 3:31 | 2008 | |
| "I Still Believe" # | Antonina Armato; Giuseppe Cantarelli | | #1's | 5:54 | 1998 | |
| "I Still Believe" (Morales Classic Club Mix) ‡ | Antonina Armato; Giuseppe Cantarelli | | —N/a | 9:02 | 1998 | |
| "I Still Believe" (Morales The Eve of Souls Mix) ‡ | Antonina Armato; Giuseppe Cantarelli | | —N/a | 10:54 | 1998 | |
| "I Still Believe" (Stevie J Remix) ‡ | Antonina Armato; Giuseppe Cantarelli | | —N/a | 5:04 | 1998 | |
| "I Still Believe/Pure Imagination" (Damizza Reemix) (Note: "I Still Believe/Pure Imagination" (Damizza Remix) contains a sample of the recording "Pure Imagination" performed by Gene Wilder as Willy Wonka and written by Leslie Bricusse and Anthony Newley.) ‡ featuring Da Brat and Krayzie Bone | Antonina Armato; Giuseppe Cantarelli; Leslie Bricusse; Anthony Newley | | —N/a | 4:32 | 1998 | |
| "I Want to Know What Love Is" # | Mick Jones | | Memoirs of an Imperfect Angel | 3:27 | 2009 | |
| "I Wish You Knew" | Mariah Carey; James Wright | | The Emancipation of Mimi | 3:34 | 2005 | |
| "I Wish You Well" | Mariah Carey; James Poyser; Mary Ann Tatum | | E=MC² | 4:35 | 2008 | |
| "I'll Be Lovin' U Long Time" (Note: "I'll Be Lovin' U Long Time" contains a sample of the recording "Stay with Me" performed by DeBarge and written by Mark DeBarge and Etterlene Jordan.) | Mariah Carey; Crystal Johnson; Aldrin Davis; Mark DeBarge; Etterlene Jordan | | E=MC² | 3:01 | 2008 | |
| "I'll Be There" # featuring Trey Lorenz | Berry Gordy; Bob West; Hal Davis; Willie Hutch | | MTV Unplugged | 4:42 | 1992 | |
| "I've Been Thinking About You" | Mariah Carey; David Cole | Mariah Carey; David Cole; Robert Clivillés | Music Box | 4:48 | 1993 | |
| "I'm That Chick" (Note: "I'm That Chick" contains elements of the recording "Off the Wall" performed by Michael Jackson and written by Rod Temperton.) | Mariah Carey; Johntá Austin; Rod Temperton; Mikkel Storleer Eriksen; Tor Erik Hermansem | | E=MC² | 3:31 | 2008 | |
| "If It's Over" | Mariah Carey | Mariah Carey; Carole King | Emotions | 4:38 | 1991 | |
| "If We" featuring Nate Dogg and Ja Rule | Mariah Carey; Damion Young; H. Hersh; Jeffrey Atkins; Nathaniel Hale | | Glitter | 4:20 | 2001 | |
| "The Impossible" (Note: "The Impossible" and "The Impossible (The Reprise)" contain a sample of the recording "Forever My Lady" performed by Jodeci and written by Albert Brown and Donald DeGrate.) | Mariah Carey; Christopher Stewart; Terius Nash; Albert Brown; Donald DeGrate | | Memoirs of an Imperfect Angel | 4:00 | 2009 | |
| "The Impossible (The Reprise)" | Mariah Carey; Christopher Stewart; Terius Nash; Albert Brown; Donald DeGrate | | Memoirs of an Imperfect Angel | 2:25 | 2009 | |
| "In the Mix" | Mariah Carey; Daniel Moore II | | —N/a | 2:55 | 2019 | |
| "Infamous" with Empire Cast & Jussie Smollett | Mariah Carey; Jermaine Dupri; James Wright | | —N/a | 3:35 | 2016 | |
| "Infinity" | Mariah Carey; Eric Hudson; Priscilla Renea; Taylor Parks; Ilsey Juber | | #1 to Infinity | 4:00 | 2015 | |
| "Inseparable" (Note: "Inseparable" contains an interpolation of the recording "Time After Time" performed by Cyndi Lauper and written by Lauper and Rob Hyman.) | Mariah Carey; Christopher Stewart; Terius Nash; Rob Hyman; Cyndi Lauper | | Memoirs of an Imperfect Angel | 3:33 | 2009 | |
| "Irresistible (West Side Connection)" featuring Westside Connection | Mariah Carey; O'Shea Jackson; Quincy Jones III; Theodore Life; Dexter Wansel; Damion Young | | Charmbracelet | 5:03 | 2002 | |
| "It's a Wrap" (Note: "It's a Wrap" contains a sample of the recording "I Belong to You" performed by Barry White and Love Unlimited Orchestra.) | Mariah Carey; Barry White | | Memoirs of an Imperfect Angel | 3:58 | 2009 | |
| "It's Like That" | Mariah Carey; Jermaine Dupri; Manuel Seal; Johntá Austin | | The Emancipation of Mimi | 3:23 | 2005 | |
| "It's Like That" (Morales Club Mix) ‡ | Mariah Carey; Jermaine Dupri; Manuel Seal; Johntá Austin | | —N/a | 8:27 | 2005 | |
| "It's Only Make Believe" # Sam Moore with Mariah Carey and Vince Gill | Jack Nance; Conway Twitty | | Overnight Sensational | 3:08 | 2006 | |
| "Jesus Born on This Day" | Mariah Carey; Walter Afanasieff | | Merry Christmas | 3:43 | 1994 | |
| "Jesus Oh What a Wonderful Child" # | Traditional | | Merry Christmas | 4:29 | 1994 | |
| "Joy Ride" | Mariah Carey; Jeffery Grier | | The Emancipation of Mimi | 4:03 | 2005 | |
| "Joy to the World" # | Traditional | | Merry Christmas | 4:20 | 1994 | |
| "Just Stand Up!" with Artists Stand Up to Cancer | Kenneth "Babyface" Edmonds; Ronnie Walton | | —N/a | 3:34 | 2008 | |
| "Just to Hold You Once Again" | Mariah Carey | Mariah Carey; Walter Afanasieff | Music Box | 3:59 | 1993 | |
| "Languishing (The Interlude)" | Mariah Carey; James Wright | | Memoirs of an Imperfect Angel | 2:33 | 2009 | |
| "Last Kiss" | Mariah Carey; Jermaine Dupri; Manuel Seal; Johntá Austin | | E=MC² | 3:36 | 2008 | |
| "Last Night a D.J. Saved My Life" # featuring Busta Rhymes, Fabolous and DJ Clue | Michael Cleveland | | Glitter | 6:43 | 2001 | |
| "Lead the Way" | Mariah Carey; Walter Afanasieff | | Glitter | 3:53 | 2001 | |
| "Lil' L.O.V.E." Bone Thugs-n-Harmony featuring Mariah Carey and Bow Wow | Mariah Carey; Shante Harris; Anthony Henderson; Steven Howse |James Phillips; Charles Struggs; Jermaine Dupri | | Strength & Loyalty | 3:55 | 2007 | |
| "Lil Snowman" | Mariah Carey; Johnny Marks; Marvin Brodie; Harvey Mason Jr. | | All I Want for Christmas Is You Soundtrack | 3:19 | 2017 | |
| "Long Ago" | Mariah Carey | Mariah Carey; Jermaine Dupri; Manuel Seal Jr. | Daydream | 3:09 | 1995 | |
| "Looking In" | Mariah Carey | Mariah Carey; Walter Afanasieff | Daydream | 3:35 | 1995 | |
| "Love Story" | Mariah Carey; Jermaine Dupri; Manuel Seal; Johntá Austin | | E=MC² | 3:56 | 2008 | |
| "Love Takes Time" | Mariah Carey; Ben Margulies | | Mariah Carey | 3:49 | 1990 | |
| "Loverboy" (Note: "Loverboy" and "Loverboy" (Morales Club of Love Mix) contain elements of the recording "Candy" performed by Cameo written by Larry Blackmon and Thomas Jenkins.) featuring Cameo | Mariah Carey; Larry Blackmon; Thomas Jenkins | | Glitter | 4:49 | 2001 | |
| "Loverboy" (Firecracker - Original Cracker Version) (Note: "Loverboy" (Firecracker - Original Cracker Version) was originally recorded in 2000 for Glitter and later included on The Rarities in 2020.) | Mariah Carey; Martin Denny | | The Rarities | 3:14 | 2020 | |
| "Loverboy" (Morales Club of Love Mix) ‡ | Mariah Carey; David Morales; Larry Blackmon; Thomas Jenkins | | —N/a | 9:06 | 2001 | |
| "Lullaby" | Mariah Carey; Vidal Davis & Andre Harris | | Charmbracelet | 4:55 | 2002 | |
| "Made for Me" | Mariah Carey; Priscilla Renea; Jermaine Mauldin; Bryan-Michael Cox; Jordan Orvosh | | —N/a | 3:09 | 2024 | |
| "Make It Happen" | Mariah Carey | Mariah Carey; David Cole; Robert Clivillés | Emotions | 5:10 | 1991 | |
| "Make It Look Good" (Note: "Make It Look Good" contains an interpolation of the recording "Let Me Make Love to You" performed by The O'Jays and written by Walter "Bunny" Sigler and Allan Felder.) | Mariah Carey; Jermaine Dupri; Bryan-Michael Cox; Walter "Bunny" Sigler; Allan Felder | | Me. I Am Mariah... The Elusive Chanteuse | 3:22 | 2014 | |
| "Makin' it Last All Night (What it Do)" featuring Jermaine Dupri | Mariah Carey; Jermaine Dupri; Bryan-Michael Cox; Johntá Austin; Jarod Alstonbr>Dalvin DeGrate; Donald DeGrate | | The Emancipation of Mimi | 3:51 | 2005 | |
| "Melt Away" | Mariah Carey; Babyface | | Daydream | 3:42 | 1995 | |
| "Mesmerized" (Note: "Mesmerized" was originally recorded in 2012 and later included on The Rarities in 2020.) | Mariah Carey; Loris Holland | | The Rarities | 3:22 | 2020 | |
| "Meteorite" (Note: "Meteorite" contains a sample of the recording "Goin' Up in Smoke" performed by Eddie Kendricks and written by Allan Felder, Norman Harris and Ron Tyson.) | Mariah Carey; Kamaal Fareed; Allan Felder; Norman Harris; Ron Tyson | | Me. I Am Mariah... The Elusive Chanteuse | 3:59 | 2014 | |
| "Mi Todo" • (Note: "Mi Todo" is a Spanish language version of Carey's song "My All". As Manny Benito translated the lyrics written by Carey into Spanish, he is credited as the sole lyric writer.) | Manny Benito | Mariah Carey; Walter Afanasieff | Butterfly | 3:51 | 1997 | |
| "Migrate" featuring T-Pain | Mariah Carey; Nathaniel Hills; Balewa Muhammad; Faheem Najm | | E=MC² | 4:17 | 2008 | |
| "Mine Again" | Mariah Carey; James Poyser | | The Emancipation of Mimi | 4:01 | 2005 | |
| "Miss You" featuring Jadakiss | Mariah Carey; Jermaine Dupri; Bryan-Michael Cox; J.T. Philips; Terry Etling; Linda Laurie | | Charmbracelet | 5:09 | 2002 | |
| "Miss You Most (At Christmas Time)" | Mariah Carey; Walter Afanasieff | | Merry Christmas | 4:32 | 1994 | |
| "Money ($ * / ...)" (Note: "Money" contains samples of the recordings "Alabeke" written and performed by Dan Snatch, and "Rapper Dapper Snapper" written and performed by Edwin Birdsong.) featuring Fabolous | Mariah Carey; Chauncey Hollis; John Jackson; Dan Satch; Edwin Birdsong | | Me. I Am Mariah... The Elusive Chanteuse | 4:57 | 2014 | |
| "More Than Just Friends" (Note: "More Than Just Friends" contains a sample of the recording "One More Chance/Stay With Me (Remix)" performed by The Notorious B.I.G. and written by Sean Combs, Chris Wallace, Rashad Smith, Mark DeBarge and Etterlene Jordan.) | Mariah Carey; Christopher Stewart; Terius Nash; Sean Combs; Chris Wallace; Rashad Smith; Mark DeBarge; Etterlene Jordan | | Memoirs of an Imperfect Angel | 3:37 | 2009 | |
| "Music Box" | Mariah Carey | Mariah Carey; Walter Afanasieff | Music Box | 4:57 | 1993 | |
| "My All" | Mariah Carey | Mariah Carey; Walter Afanasieff | Butterfly | 3:53 | 1997 | |
| "My All" (Morales 'My' Club Mix) ‡ | Mariah Carey | Mariah Carey; Walter Afanasieff | The Remixes | 7:10 | 2003 | |
| "My All/Stay Awhile" (So So Def Remix) ‡ (Note: "My All/Stay Awhile" So So Def Remix contains a sample of the song "Stay a Little While, Child" performed by Loose Ends and written by Carl McIntosh, Jane Eugene & Steve Nichol.) featuring Lord Tariq and Peter Gunz | Mariah Carey; Carl McIntosh, Jane Eugene & Steve Nichol | Mariah Carey; Walter Afanasieff; Carl McIntosh, Jane Eugene & Steve Nichol | The Remixes | 4:44 | 2003 | |
| "My Love" The-Dream featuring Mariah Carey | Mariah Carey; Terius Nash; Carlos McKinney | | Love vs. Money | 3:27 | 2009 | |
| "My Saving Grace" | Mariah Carey; Kenneth Crouch; Trevor Lawrence; Randy Jackson | | Charmbracelet | 4:09 | 2002 | |
| "Never Forget You" | Mariah Carey; Babyface | | Music Box | 3:46 | 1993 | |
| "Never Too Far" | Mariah Carey; Jimmy Jam & Terry Lewis | | Glitter | 4:21 | 2001 | |
| "Never Too Far/Hero Medley" | Mariah Carey; Jimmy Jam & Terry Lewis | Mariah Carey; Walter Afanasieff; Jimmy Jam & Terry Lewis | Greatest Hits | 4:48 | 2001 | |
| "Now That I Know" | Mariah Carey | Mariah Carey; David Cole; Robert Clivillés | Music Box | 4:19 | 1993 | |
| "O Come All Ye Faithful"/"Hallelujah Chorus" # featuring Patricia Carey | Public Domain; George Frideric Handel | | Merry Christmas II You | 3:38 | 2010 | |
| "O Holy Night" # | Traditional | | Merry Christmas | 4:27 | 1994 | |
| "O Little Town of Bethlehem"/"Little Drummer Boy Medley" # | Phillips Brooks; Lewis H. Redner; Katherine Davis; Henry Onorati; Harry Simeone | | Merry Christmas II You | 3:32 | 2010 | |
| "Obsessed" | Mariah Carey; Christopher Stewart; Terius Nash | | Memoirs of an Imperfect Angel | 4:02 | 2009 | |
| "Oh Santa!"‡ | Mariah Carey; Jermaine Dupri; Bryan-Michael Cox | | Merry Christmas II You | 3:31 | 2010 | |
| "Oh Santa!" featuring Ariana Grande and Jennifer Hudson‡ | Mariah Carey; Jermaine Dupri; Bryan-Michael Cox | | Mariah Carey's Magical Christmas Special (Apple TV+ Original Soundtrack) | 3:20 | 2020 | |
| "One and Only" featuring Twista | Mariah Carey; Samuel Lindley; Carl Mitchell | | The Emancipation of Mimi | 3:14 | 2005 | |
| "One Child" | Mariah Carey; Marc Shaiman | | Merry Christmas II You | 4:26 | 2010 | |
| "One Mo' Gen" | Mariah Carey; Frederick Ball; Ebony Oshunrinde; Jason Boyd | | Caution | 3:25 | 2018 | |
| "One More Try" # | George Michael | | Me. I Am Mariah... The Elusive Chanteuse | 6:21 | 2014 | |
| "One Night" (Note: "One Night" was originally recorded in 1995 for Daydream and later included on The Rarities in 2020.) | Mariah Carey; Jermaine Dupri | | The Rarities | 4:41 | 2020 | |
| "One Sweet Day" with Boyz II Men | Mariah Carey; Michael McCary; Nathan Morris; Shawn Stockman; Wanya Morris | Mariah Carey; Walter Afanasieff | Daydream | 4:42 | 1995 | |
| "O.O.C" | Mariah Carey; Kasseem Dean; Sheldon Harris | | E=MC² | 3:26 | 2008 | |
| "Open Arms" # | Jonathan Cain; Steve Perry | | Daydream | 3:30 | 1995 | |
| "Out Here on My Own" # (Note: "Out Here on My Own" was originally recorded in 2000 for Glitter and later included on The Rarities in 2020.) | Lesley Gore; Michael Gore | | The Rarities | 3:16 | 2020 | |
| "Outside" | Mariah Carey | Mariah Carey; Walter Afanasieff | Butterfly | 4:47 | 1997 | |
| "Petals" | Mariah Carey; James Wright; Jimmy Jam & Terry Lewis | | Rainbow | 4:22 | 1999 | |
| "Portrait" | Mariah Carey; Daniel Moore II | | Caution | 4:01 | 2018 | |
| "Prisoner" | Mariah Carey; Ben Margulies | | Mariah Carey | 4:24 | 1990 | |
| "Rainbow (Interlude)" | Mariah Carey; Jimmy Jam & Terry Lewis | | Rainbow | 1:32 | 1999 | |
| "Reflections (Care Enough)" | Mariah Carey; Phillipe Pierre | | Glitter | 3:20 | 2001 | |
| "Ribbon" | Mariah Carey; Christopher Stewart; Terius Nash | | Memoirs of an Imperfect Angel | 4:20 | 2009 | |
| "Right to Dream" | Mariah Carey | Willie Nelson | —N/a | 3:32 | 2008 | |
| "The Roof (Back in Time)" (Note: "The Roof" contains a sample of the recording "Shook Ones (Part II)" written and performed by Mobb Deep.) | Mariah Carey | Mariah Carey; Cory Rooney; Kejuan Muchita; Albert Johnson; Jean Claude Oliver; Samuel Barnes | Butterfly | 5:14 | 1997 | |
| "Runway" | Mariah Carey; Sonny Moore; Peder Losnegård; Priscilla Hamilton | | Caution | 3:41 | 2018 | |
| "Santa Claus Is Comin' to Town" # | Haven Gillespie; John Frederick Coots | | Merry Christmas | 3:24 | 1994 | |
| "Santa Claus Is Coming to Town" (Intro) # | Haven Gillespie; John Frederick Coots | | Merry Christmas II You | 0:23 | 2010 | |
| "Save the Day" with Lauryn Hill | Mariah Carey; Jermaine Dupri; James "Big Jim" Wright; Charles Fox; Norman Gimbel | | The Rarities | 3:49 | 2020 | |
| "Say Somethin'" featuring Snoop Dogg | Mariah Carey; Pharrell Williams; Chad Hugo; Calvin Broadus | | The Emancipation of Mimi | 3:44 | 2005 | |
| "Say Somethin'" Morales Stereo Anthem Mix) ‡ featuring Snoop Dogg | Mariah Carey; Pharrell Williams; Chad Hugo; Calvin Broadus | | —N/a | 9:40 | 2005 | |
| "Say Somethin'" (So So Def Remix) ‡ featuring Dem Franchize Boyz | Mariah Carey; Pharrell Williams; Chad Hugo; Calvin Broadus; Jermaine Dupri; Maurice Gleaton, Jamal Willingham, Bernard Leverette & Gerald Tiller | | —N/a | 4:09 | 2005 | |
| "Secret Love" | Mariah Carey; Kaseem Dean | | The Emancipation of Mimi | 3:09 | 2005 | |
| "Sent From Up Above" | Mariah Carey; Rhett Lawrence | | Mariah Carey | 4:05 | 1990 | |
| "Shake It Off" | Mariah Carey; Jermaine Dupri; Bryan-Michael Cox; Johntá Austin | | The Emancipation of Mimi | 3:52 | 2005 | |
| "Side Effects" featuring Jeezy | Mariah Carey; Crystal Johnson; Scott Storch; Jay Jenkins | | E=MC² | 4:22 | 2008 | |
| "Silent Night" # | Franz Xaver Gruber | | Merry Christmas | 3:41 | 1994 | |
| "Slipping Away" | Mariah Carey | Mariah Carey; Dave Hall | B-side to "Open Arms" | 4:32 | 1995 | |
| "So Blessed" | Mariah Carey | Mariah Carey; Walter Afanasieff | Emotions | 4:13 | 1991 | |
| "So Lonely (One and Only Part II)" with Twista | Mariah Carey; Carl Mitchell; Rodney Jerkins; Adonis Shropshire; Makeba Riddick | | The Emancipation of Mimi and The Day After | 3:53 | 2005 | |
| "Someday" | Mariah Carey; Ben Margulies | | Mariah Carey | 4:06 | 1990 | |
| "Sprung" | Mariah Carey; L. Leeper; Gloria Jones; Pamela Sawyer | | The Emancipation of Mimi | 3:25 | 2005 | |
| "Standing O" | Mariah Carey; Christopher Stewart; Terius Nash | | Memoirs of an Imperfect Angel | 3:59 | 2009 | |
| "The Star" | Mariah Carey; Marc Shaiman | | The Star Soundtrack | 4:01 | 2017 | |
| "Stay the Night" | Mariah Carey; Kanye West; Thom Bell; Linda Creed | | The Emancipation of Mimi | 3:57 | 2005 | |
| "Stay Long Love You" featuring Gunna | Mariah Carey; Sergio Kitchens; Jonathan Yip; Ray Romulus; Jeremy Reeves; Ray Charles McCollough II | | Caution | 3:01 | 2018 | |
| "Subtle Invitation" | Mariah Carey; Aurelias 7 Lloyd Smith; Kenneth Crouch; Rob Bacon; Randy Jackson | | Charmbracelet | 4:26 | 2002 | |
| "Sugar Plum Fairy Introlude" | Traditional | | Merry Christmas (Deluxe Anniversary Edition) | 0:44 | 2019 | |
| "Sunflowers for Alfred Roy" | Mariah Carey; Lionel Cole | | Charmbracelet | 4:34 | 2002 | |
| "Supernatural" featuring Monroe and Moroccan Cannon | Mariah Carey; Jermaine Dupri; Bryan-Michael Cox | | Me. I Am Mariah... The Elusive Chanteuse | 4:42 | 2014 | |
| "Sweetheart" # with JD | Rainy Davis; Pete Warner | | #1's | 4:21 | 1998 | |
| "Thank God I Found You" featuring Joe & 98 Degrees | Mariah Carey; Jimmy Jam & Terry Lewis | | Rainbow | 4:17 | 1999 | |
| "Thank God I Found You" (Make It Last Remix) (Note: "Thank God I Found You" (Make It Last Remix) contains interpolations of the recording "Make It Last Forever" performed by Keith Sweat featuring Jackie McGhee and written by Sweat and Teddy Riley.) ‡ featuring Joe and Nas | Mariah Carey; Teddy Riley; Keith Sweat; Jimmy Jam & Terry Lewis | | The Remixes | 5:08 | 2003 | |
| "Thanx for Nothin'" | Mariah Carey; Jermaine Dupri; Manuel Seal | | E=MC² | 3:05 | 2008 | |
| "The Art of Letting Go" | Mariah Carey; Rodney Jerkins | | Me. I Am Mariah... The Elusive Chanteuse | 3:44 | 2014 | |
| "The Distance" featuring Ty Dolla Sign | Mariah Carey; Sonny Moore; Peder Losnegård; Jason Boyd; Tyrone Griffin Jr. | | Caution | 3:27 | 2018 | |
| "The One" | Mariah Carey; Jermaine Dupri; Bryan-Michael Cox | | Charmbracelet | 4:08 | 2002 | |
| "The One" (So So Def Remix) ‡ featuring Bone Crusher | Mariah Carey; Jermaine Dupri; Bryan-Michael Cox | | Charmbracelet | 4:38 | 2002 | |
| "There for Me" | Mariah Carey; Diane Warren; David Foster | | B-side to "Never Too Far/Hero Medley" | 4:15 | 2001 | |
| "There Goes My Heart" | Mariah Carey; Irving Lorenzo; Aurelias 7 Lloyd L. Smith | | Charmbracelet | 4:11 | 2002 | |
| "There's Got to Be a Way" | Mariah Carey | Mariah Carey; Ric Wake | Mariah Carey | 4:53 | 1990 | |
| "There's Got to Be a Way" (12" Remix) ‡ | Mariah Carey | Mariah Carey; Ric Wake | —N/a | 8:21 | 1991 | |
| "There's Got to Be a Way" (Alt. Vocal Dub Mix) ‡ | Mariah Carey | Mariah Carey; Ric Wake | —N/a | 6:46 | 1991 | |
| "Things That U Do" Jay-Z featuring Mariah Carey | Shawn Carter; Kasseem Dean; Kyambo Joshua | | Vol. 3... Life and Times of S. Carter | 4:52 | 1999 | |
| "Thirsty" | Mariah Carey; Chauncey Hollis; Denisia "Blu June" Andrews; Maryann Tatum | | Me. I Am Mariah... The Elusive Chanteuse | 3:26 | 2014 | |
| "Through the Rain" | Mariah Carey; Lionel Cole | | Charmbracelet | 4:48 | 2002 | |
| "Through the Rain" (Remix) ‡ featuring Joe and Kelly Price | Mariah Carey; Kenneth Crouch; Randy Jackson | | Charmbracelet | 3:32 | 2002 | |
| "'Til the End of Time" | Mariah Carey | Mariah Carey; Walter Afanasieff | Emotions | 5:35 | 1991 | |
| "To Be Around You" | Mariah Carey | Mariah Carey; David Cole | Emotions | 4:37 | 1991 | |
| "To the Floor" featuring Nelly | Mariah Carey; Pharrell Williams; Chad Hugo; Cornell Haynes | | The Emancipation of Mimi | 3:27 | 2005 | |
| "Todo Para Ti" • with The All Stars | Michael Jackson; Rubén Blades | | —N/a | 4:39 | 2001 | |
| "Touch My Body" | Mariah Carey; Christopher Stewart; Terius Nash; Crystal Johnson | | E=MC² | 3:24 | 2008 | |
| "Triumphant (Get 'Em)" featuring Rick Ross and Meek Mill | Mariah Carey; Jermaine Dupri; Bryan-Michael Cox; William L. Roberts II; Robert R. Williams | | —N/a | 4:10 | 2012 | |
| "Triumphant (Get 'Em)" (Vintage Throwback Mix) ‡ | Mariah Carey; Jermaine Dupri; Bryan-Michael Cox | | —N/a | 4:53 | 2012 | |
| "Twister" | Mariah Carey; James Wright; Jimmy Jam & Terry Lewis | | Glitter | 2:26 | 2001 | |
| "Type Dangerous" | Mariah Carey; Brandon P. Anderson; Daniel Moore II; Eric Barrier; Jairus Mozee; Jason Pounds; NWi; Rae Khalil; William Griffin | | Here for It All | 2:55 | 2025 | |
| "U Make Me Wanna" Jadakiss featuring Mariah Carey | Mariah Carey; Jason Phillips; Scott Storch | | Kiss of Death | 4:53 | 2004 | |
| "Underneath the Stars" | Mariah Carey | Mariah Carey; Walter Afanasieff | Daydream | 3:33 | 1995 | |
| "Unforgettable" (Mariah Carey Acoustic Remix) French Montana featuring Swae Lee and Mariah Carey | Karim Kharbouch; Khalif Brown; Christopher Washington; Jake Aujla; McCulloch Sutphin | | —N/a | 4:04 | 2017 | |
| "Unforgettable" (Mariah Carey Remix) French Montana featuring Swae Lee and Mariah Carey | Karim Kharbouch; Khalif Brown; Christopher Washington; Jake Aujla; McCulloch Sutphin | | —N/a | 3:53 | 2017 | |
| "Up Out My Face" | Mariah Carey; Christopher Stewart; Terius Nash | | Memoirs of an Imperfect Angel | 3:41 | 2009 | |
| "Up Out My Face (The Reprise)" | Mariah Carey; Christopher Stewart; Terius Nash | | Memoirs of an Imperfect Angel | 0:51 | 2009 | |
| "Vanishing" | Mariah Carey; Ben Margulies | | Mariah Carey | 4:12 | 1990 | |
| "Vision of Love" | Mariah Carey; Ben Margulies | | Mariah Carey | 3:28 | 1990 | |
| "Vulnerability (Interlude)" | Mariah Carey | | Rainbow | 1:11 | 1999 | |
| "Want You" featuring Eric Benét | Mariah Carey; James Wright; Jimmy Jam & Terry Lewis | | Glitter | 4:43 | 2001 | |
| "We Belong Together" (Note: "We Belong Together" and "We Belong Together" (Desert Storm Remix) contain samples of the recordings "If You Think You're Lonely Now" performed by Bobby Womack and written by Womack, Patrick Moten and Sandra Sully, and "Two Occasions" performed by The Deele and written by Darnell Bristol, Babyface and Sidney DeWayne.) | Mariah Carey; Jermaine Dupri; Manuel Seal; Johntá Austin; Darnell Bristol; Kenneth Edmonds; Sidney DeWayne; Bobby Womack; Patrick Moten; Sandra Sully | | The Emancipation of Mimi | 3:21 | 2005 | |
| "We Belong Together" (Desert Storm Remix) ‡ featuring Jadakiss and Styles P | Mariah Carey; Jermaine Dupri; Manuel Seal; Johntá Austin; Darnell Bristol; Kenneth Edmonds; Sidney DeWayne; Bobby Womack; Patrick Moten; Sandra Sully | | The Emancipation of Mimi | 4:25 | 2005 | |
| "What More Can I Give" with The All Stars | Michael Jackson | | —N/a | 5:03 | 2001 | |
| "When Do the Bells Ring for Me" with Tony Bennett | Charles De Forest | | Duets II | 2:52 | 2011 | |
| "When Christmas Comes" | Mariah Carey; James Poyser | | Merry Christmas II You | 4:46 | 2010 | |
| "When I Saw You" | Mariah Carey | Mariah Carey; Walter Afanasieff | Daydream | 4:25 | 1995 | |
| "When You Believe" with Whitney Houston | Stephen Schwartz; Babyface | | #1's | 4:35 | 1998 | |
| "Whenever You Call" | Mariah Carey | Mariah Carey; Walter Afanasieff | Butterfly | 4:20 | 1997 | |
| "Where I Belong" Busta Rhymes featuring Mariah Carey | Trevor Smith; Ricardo Thomas; Michel Sotolongo; J. J Doe Smith | | Extinction Level Event 2: The Wrath of God | 4:12 | 2020 | |
| "The Wind" | Mariah Carey | Russ Freeman | Emotions | 4:41 | 1991 | |
| "With You" | Mariah Carey; Dijon McFarlane; Charles Henshaw; Greg Lawary | | Caution | 3:47 | 2018 | |
| "Without You" # | William Peter Ham; Tom Evans | | Music Box | 3:36 | 1993 | |
| "X-Girlfriend" | Mariah Carey; Kandi Burruss; Kevin Briggs | | Rainbow | 3:57 | 1999 | |
| "Yes, And?" (remix) Ariana Grande & Mariah Carey | Ariana Grande; Max Martin; Ilya Salmanzadeh | | Eternal Sunshine (Slightly Deluxe) | 3:35 | 2024 | |
| "You Don't Know What to Do" (Note: "You Don't Know What to Do" contains an interpolation of the recording "I'm Caught Up in a One Night Affair" performed by Inner Life and written by Patrick Adams and Terri Gonzalez.) featuring Wale | Mariah Carey; Jermaine Dupri; Bryan-Michael Cox; Olubowale Akintimehin; Patrick Adams; Terri Gonzalez | | Me. I Am Mariah... The Elusive Chanteuse | 3:46 | 2014 | |
| "You Got Me" featuring Jay-Z and Freeway | Mariah Carey; Shawn Carter; Leslie Pridgen; Justin Smith | | Charmbracelet | 4:22 | 2002 | |
| "You Had Your Chance" | Mariah Carey; Jermaine Dupri; Bryan-Michael Cox; Leon Haywood | | Charmbracelet | 4:22 | 2002 | |
| "You Need Me" | Mariah Carey; Rhett Lawrence | | Mariah Carey | 3:51 | 1990 | |
| "Your Girl" | Mariah Carey; Marc Shemer | | The Emancipation of Mimi | 2:46 | 2005 | |
| "Yours" | Mariah Carey; James Wright; Jimmy Jam & Terry Lewis | | Charmbracelet | 5:06 | 2002 | |
| "You're Mine (Eternal)" | Mariah Carey; Rodney Jerkins | | Me. I Am Mariah... The Elusive Chanteuse | 3:44 | 2014 | |
| "You're So Cold" | Mariah Carey | Mariah Carey; David Cole | Emotions | 5:05 | 1991 | |
