= The Poet (album) =

Studio album by Bobby Womack
- Released: November 1981
- Recorded: 1981
- Studio: Kendun Recorders, Burbank, California; Hit City West, Los Angeles, California
- Genre: Soul; R&B
- Length: 39:37
- Label: Beverly Glen Music
- Producer: Bobby Womack

Bobby Womack chronology
| Roads of Life (1979) | The Poet (1981) | The Poet II (1984) |

Professional ratings
Review scores
| Source | Rating |
|---|---|
| AllMusic | 4/5 stars |
| The Encyclopedia of Popular Music | 3/5 stars |
| Record Collector | 4/5 stars |

The Poet is the thirteenth studio album by American musician Bobby Womack. The album was released in November 1981, by Beverly Glen Music. The album reached the top of the Billboard Top Black Albums chart due to the success of the single "If You Think You're Lonely Now", which peaked at number three on the Billboard Hot Black Singles chart.

In a 2024 overview of Womack's output, Sebastian Zabel of Rolling Stone Germany wrote of The Poet that "Womack's classic songwriting and his warm, passionate voice work perfectly here with the contemporary, but also subtly personalised production...The album is one of the few outstanding soul albums of the eighties."

== Track listing ==
| No. | Title | Writer(s) | Length |
|---|---|---|---|
| 1. | "So Many Sides of You" | Bobby Womack, Jim Ford | 3:44 |
| 2. | "Lay Your Lovin' on Me" | Bobby Womack, Patrick Moten, Sandra Sully | 4:03 |
| 3. | "Secrets" | Bobby Womack, Jim Ford | 3:54 |
| 4. | "Just My Imagination" | Bobby Womack | 5:05 |
| 5. | "Stand Up" | Cecil Womack | 3:30 |
| 6. | "Games" | Bobby Womack, Roger Dollarhide | 6:51 |
| 7. | "If You Think You're Lonely Now" | Bobby Womack, Patrick Moten, Richard Griffin | 5:30 |
| 8. | "Where Do We Go from Here" | Bobby Womack, Jim Ford | 6:40 |

== Personnel ==
- Bobby Womack - guitar, lead vocals
- Nathan East, David Shields - bass
- Dorothy Ashby - harp, percussion
- David T. Walker - guitar
- Eddie "Bongo" Brown, Paulinho da Costa - percussion
- James Gadson - drums
- Patrick Moten, Dale Ramsey - keyboards
- Regina Womack, Sally Womack, Vincent Womack, Tondalei - handclaps
- Cecil Womack, Curtis Womack, Friendly Womack, Jr., The Waters, Richard Griffin, Fernando Harkless, John Parham, Jon Rami - backing vocals

Technical

- Otis Smith - executive producer
- Avi Kipper, Barney Perkins, Robert Battaglia - engineer
- Ginny Livingston - art direction
- Norman Seeff - photography

== Charts ==
| Chart (1982) | Peak position |
|---|---|
| Billboard Pop Albums | 29 |
| Billboard Top Black Albums | 1 |

=== Singles ===
| Year | Single | Chart positions |
| Year | Single | US R&B |
|---|---|---|
| 1981 | "Secrets" | 55 |
| 1982 | "If You Think You're Lonely Now" | 3 |
| 1982 | "Where Do We Go from Here" | 26 |
