= The Songstress =

- Cover of the original 1983 release

Studio album by Anita Baker
- Released: May 31, 1983; November 12, 1991 (reissue)
- Studios: Kendun Recorders (Burbank, California)
- Genres: R&B; soul; soul jazz
- Length: 42:00
- Labels: Beverly Glen; Elektra (reissue)
- Producers: Patrick Moten; Otis Smith

Anita Baker chronology
The Songstress (1983)	Rapture (1986)

Singles from The Songstress
- 1. "Angel" Released: 1983; 2. "You're the Best Thing Yet" Released: 1983; 3. "No More Tears" Released: 1983; 4. "Feel the Need" Released: 1984

Professional ratings
Review scores
Source	Rating
AllMusic	3.5/5 stars
BBC	(positive)
Christgau's Record Guide	B+

The Songstress is the debut solo studio album by the American R&B/soul singer Anita Baker. It was originally released in 1983 by Beverly Glen Music, and was Baker's only album for that label prior to signing with Elektra Records with whom she had a string of hit albums. The Songstress was not a commercial success upon its initial release, though the album met with moderate success on the R&B charts. It did have a 1984 compact disc release and was one of the first independently released compact Discs. Notorious drug trafficker "Freeway" Rick Ross helped provide the money for the album.

Baker became a major international success after signing with Elektra Records (a division of Warner Music Group) in 1986, and Elektra acquired the rights to The Songstress and re-released it with a new cover in 1991. Between 1992 and 2007, the album sold 307,000 copies in the US according to SoundScan figures.

== Reception ==
"No More Tears" peaked at number 49 on Billboard's Hot Black Singles chart, becoming Baker's first entry on the Billboard's singles chart; "Angel," number five on the same chart; "You're the Best Thing Yet," number 28.

Alex Henderson of AllMusic rated the album three and a half stars, praising her ballads and 'slow jams' (such as "No More Tears", "Angel", and "You're the Best Thing Yet"), calling them "honest [and] heartfelt", along with faster material such as "Squeeze Me" (which he referred to as "a sweaty taste of gospel-drenched funk.

== Track listing ==
1. "Angel" (Patrick Moten, Sandra Sully) - 4:57
2. "You're the Best Thing Yet" (Moten, Geronne C. Turner) - 5:36
3. "Feel the Need" (Moten) - 5:35
4. "Squeeze Me" (Moten) - 4:40
5. "No More Tears" (Michael J. Powell) - 5:38
6. "Sometimes" (Moten, Sully) - 5:53
7. "Will You Be Mine" (Moten, Carlos Turrentine) - 5:24
8. "Do You Believe Me" (Moten) - 3:55

== Personnel ==
Musicians

- Anita Baker – lead vocals
- Patrick Moten – keyboards
- Craig Cooper – guitars
- Paul Jackson Jr. – guitars
- James Macon – guitars
- David T. Walker – guitars
- Nathan East – bass
- Raymond Calhoun – drums
- James Gadson – drums
- Tony Coleman – string contractor
- Billy Page – string contractor
- Jim Gilstrap – backing vocals
- Bunny Hull – backing vocals
- Clydene Jackson – backing vocals
- Phil Perry – backing vocals
- Carmen Twillie – backing vocals
- "The Waters": Maxine Waters Willard, Julia Tillman Waters, Luther Waters and Oren Waters – backing vocals

Music arrangements

- Patrick Moten – rhythm section arrangements, BGV arrangements
- Otis Smith – BGV arrangements
- Jerry Hey – horn arrangements
- Gene Page – string arrangements

== Production ==
- Otis Smith – executive producer, producer
- Patrick Moten – producer
- Barney Perkins – engineer
- Tom Cummings – assistant engineer
- John Matousek – mastering at Hitsville Studios (Hollywood, California)
- Ginny Livingston – art direction, design
- Richard Arrindell – photography

1991 Remastered edition

- John Matousek – digital remastering
- Gerard Smerek – digital remastering, editing
- Soundworks West (Hollywood, California) – editing and remastering location
- John Coulter Design – art direction, design
- Kevin Winter – front cover and inside photography
- Adrian Buckmaster – back cover photography
- David Nathan – liner notes

== Charts ==
Chart (1983)	Peak position
US Billboard 200	138
US Billboard Top R&B Albums	12
