= If You Think You're Lonely Now =

Single by Bobby Womack

from the album The Poet
- Released: August 1981
- Recorded: 1981
- Genre: R&B; gospel; soul
- Length: 5:30
- Label: Beverly Glen Music
- Songwriters: Bobby Womack, Patrick Moten, Sandra Sully
- Producer: Bobby Womack

Bobby Womack singles chronology
"Secrets" (1981)	"If You Think You're Lonely Now" (1981)	"Where Do We Go From Here" (1982)

K-Ci Hailey singles chronology
"What About Us" (1994)	"If You Think You're Lonely Now" (1995)	"Freek'n You" (1995)

"If You Think You're Lonely Now" is a song recorded and released by American soul singer-songwriter Bobby Womack in August 1981 from his thirteenth studio album, The Poet (1981). It was initially released as the B-side to his song "Secrets" but proved to be the more popular track. The single reached number three for four weeks on the US Billboard Hot Soul Singles chart. This is significant because Womack released the song during a time when R&B was on a down slope and the charts were largely dominated by dance music.

== Reception ==
For Record Collector, Tim Brown wrote, "There was a major hit single in the form of the rambling ballad 'If You Think You’re Lonely Now', a true return to form."

== Charts ==
Chart (1982)	Peak position
US Hot R&B/Hip-Hop Songs (Billboard)	3

=== K-Ci Hailey version ===
The song was later revised in 1994 by K-Ci Hailey of Jodeci, which is featured on the soundtrack to the film, Jason's Lyric. K-Ci's version was a pop hit, which peaked to numbers 17 and 20 on the US Billboard Hot 100 and Cash Box Top 100 charts, and number 11 on the Billboard Hot R&B Singles chart. The song's main hook is also invoked by Mariah Carey in her 2005 song "We Belong Together".

Chart (1995)	Peak position
US Billboard Hot 100	17
US Hot R&B/Hip-Hop Songs (Billboard)	11
US Cash Box Top 100	20
