= We Belong Together =

2005 single by Mariah Carey

Single by Mariah Carey

from the album The Emancipation of Mimi
- B-side: "It's Like That" (remix)
- Released: March 15, 2005
- Studio: Right Track (New York City); Southside (Atlanta, Georgia)
- Genre: R&B
- Length: 3:21
- Label: Island Def Jam
- Composers: Mariah Carey; Jermaine Dupri; Manuel Seal
- Lyricists: Mariah Carey; Jermaine Dupri; Johntá Austin; Kenneth Edmonds; Darnell Bristol; Sid Johnson; Bobby Womack; Patrick Moten; Sandra Sully
- Producers: Mariah Carey; Jermaine Dupri; Manuel Seal

Mariah Carey singles chronology
"It's Like That" (2005)	"We Belong Together" (2005)	"Shake It Off" (2005)

Music video
- "We Belong Together" on YouTube

"We Belong Together" is a song by the American singer-songwriter Mariah Carey from her tenth album, The Emancipation of Mimi (2005). The song was released on March 15, 2005, through Island Records, as the second single from the album. "We Belong Together" was written by Carey, Jermaine Dupri, Manuel Seal, and Johntá Austin and produced by the former three. Since the song interpolates lyrics from Bobby Womack's "If You Think You're Lonely Now" (1981) and the Deele's "Two Occasions" (1987), those songwriters are credited. "We Belong Together" is built on a simple piano arrangement with an understated backbeat. The lyrics chronicle a woman's desperation for her former lover to return.

Following a relatively unsuccessful period for Carey between 2001 and 2004, critics dubbed the song her musical comeback, as many had considered her career over. "We Belong Together" earned her several music industry awards and nominations throughout 2005 and 2006. The song broke chart records in the United States and became Carey's sixteenth topper on the US Billboard Hot 100. After staying at number one for fourteen nonconsecutive weeks, it joined four other songs in a tie as the second longest running number-one song in US chart history, behind Carey's own 1995 collaboration with Boyz II Men titled "One Sweet Day". Billboard listed it as the "song of the decade" and the fifteenth most popular song of all time. Additionally, it broke several airplay records, gathering both the largest one-day and one-week audiences in history. "We Belong Together" also topped the charts in Australia and Croatia; and reached the top five in more than ten countries, including Ireland, the Netherlands, New Zealand, Spain and the United Kingdom.

The song's music video was filmed as a two-part story with "It's Like That", which featured Carey at her bachelorette party. The video for "We Belong Together" is a continuation, focusing on Carey's wedding to a powerful older man and ending with the singer eloping with her younger ex-lover (played by actor Wentworth Miller of the TV show Prison Break). Carey performed the song on several award shows and television appearances around the world, namely MTV Movie Awards, MTV Video Music Awards, Macy's 4th of July Fireworks, The Oprah Winfrey Show and the 48th Grammy Awards. At the 48th Annual Grammy Awards, the song won Best Female R&B Vocal Performance and Best R&B Song, and also received a nomination for Record of the Year and Song of the Year. In Europe the song was performed at the Live 8 charity concert, the Fashion Rocks in Monaco, and the German Bambi Awards. Carey performed the song while on The Adventures of Mimi Tour and the song has been on every tour set list since then.

== Background ==
Carey had produced back-to-back critically and commercially panned albums, Glitter (2001) and Charmbracelet (2002). Though fueled by strong media attention regarding Carey's return to music, as well as her new deal with Island Records, Charmbracelet failed to deliver the type of success she had been accustomed to throughout the 1990s, and only managed sales of 3 million copies globally. After the album's release, and its succeeding tour, Carey began conceptualizing and working on a new project, eventually titled The Emancipation of Mimi, her tenth studio effort. "We Belong Together" became a song that critics considered Carey's "return to form" and "the return of the Voice", after several questioned her vocal abilities following the release of Charmbracelet.

By November 2004, Carey had already recorded several songs for The Emancipation of Mimi. Island Records chairman L.A. Reid suggested Carey that she compose a few more strong singles to ensure the project's commercial success. Believing that she had written some of her best work with Jermaine Dupri, Reid recommended her to meet with Dupri for a brief studio session. Carey headed to Atlanta to collaborate with Dupri where the duo wrote and produced "Shake It Off" and "Get Your Number", which were eventually released as the album's third and fourth singles. Following this recording session, "Shake It Off" was briefly selected as the album's lead single, replacing the originally planned "Say Somethin'". Carey returned to Atlanta for a second meeting with Dupri; during this trip, Carey and Dupri penned the last two songs to be included on the album, "We Belong Together" and "It's Like That". In an interview with Billboard, Carey described her sentiments regarding the song during the production stage:

I had the chills. I had a great feeling about it when we finished writing the song, and I was flying back from Atlanta at some crazy hour of the morning... But we were listening to it on the plane ride on the way home, and even from the demo version, I really felt something very special.

Carey and her management then decided to release "It's Like That", which Carey called "the right fire-starter", as the album's lead single. She later reminisced about her experience with Dupri: "I am so grateful I went to Atlanta," she said. "And I have to say, we wrote some of my favorite songs on the album. I'm so proud of Jermaine – he's so focused, and he knew what had to be done."

== Music and structure ==
"We Belong Together" is an R&B ballad. Rolling Stone called it "soulful." The song is propelled by a programmed Roland TR-808-styled kick and hi-hat, which is prominently utilized in hip hop music. Reviewer Jennifer Vineyard from MTV News commented that Carey's spare and understated singing approach gave the song more power, which would not have been achieved if she had belted. The song also incorporates 1980s retro-soul music by "cleverly" referencing Bobby Womack's "If You Think You're Lonely Now" (1981) and the Deele's "Two Occasions" (1987), with Babyface. In the second verse of "We Belong Together", Carey sings: "Bobby Womack's on the radio / Singing to me, 'If you think you're lonely now'." She then flips across a radio dial: "So I turn the dial, tryin’ to catch a break / And then I hear Babyface / 'I only think of you...'." The line "If you think you're lonely now" is from the song of the same name and "I only think of you" is from the chorus of "Two Occasions." In the remix she also says "I only think of you / On two occasions / That's day and night..." Due to the inclusion of the lyrics from both songs, the songwriters were given co-writing credits on the song. "We Belong Together" follows the common verse-chorus form and is structured into three distinct sections, with each section presenting the protagonist in different emotions. The first section chronicles the break-up of the couple, and a sorrowful tone is established as she laments her former mistakes. In the second section, the narrative switches to the present, and the protagonist becomes increasingly agitated and feels "all out of her element" when she attempts to distract herself by listening to the radio, but fails. "We Belong Together" does not have a bridge; instead, Carey transitions into the third section by raising the pitch an octave, which emphasizes the sheer frustration and desperation of the protagonist. Metro Times writer Johnny Loftus described the song's production, lyrics and vocals in detail:

It’s straightforward, heartfelt and classy. Mariah pleads with her departed lover – 'When you left I lost a part of me / It’s still so hard to believe' – and the song’s gentle R&B roll is perfectly understated, built from a few piano chords and a slowed-down So So Def rhythm. It has a homebody quality, almost like an autumn song would – you can imagine a split-up couple singing it quietly, separately, as the world goes on around them. She’s on a porch with tea; he’s stuck in traffic when he finds Mariah on the radio. It even cleverly references that feel, with Mariah finding the Bobby Womack and Babyface songs on her radio just too tough to hear. There’s no tired 'I tried to 2-way you' retorts, no trash-technology love affair 'I was at the grocery store and this guy had the same ring tone as you, and I cried.' No, there’s a classic sensibility to the lyrics and sound of 'We Belong Together' that makes for perfect – and perfectly universal – pop/R&B songwriting. In other words, it’s the jam. And there’s probably a happy ending, too: Mariah’s triumphant octave shift finale makes the song’s title an emphatic.

"We Belong Together" is a simple, understated musical arrangement set in C major and composed in 4/4 time. Similarly, within the song, Carey's voice spans from G_{3} to the high note of A_{5}. Carey's vocal range is demonstrated with a greater emphasis in the ending chorus, where the chorus is raised an octave higher, lying from G_{4} to A_{5}. As such, Carey ends with an anticipated coda, completing both the chorus and the song with a potent, belted note of C_{5} for approximately four semibreves (around 17 seconds). It follows the common verse-chorus form and is structured into three sections that portray the protagonist in a range of emotions; from doleful and resigned in the first section, to desperate and agitated in the second. In the last section the song climaxes with an octave raise, which not only emphasizes the protagonist's heightened desperation, but her determination to be with her lover. Sheet music for "We Belong Together" is in the key of C major with a slow tempo of 70 beats per minute. Carey's vocals span from G_{3} to A_{5}, and the song follows a chord progression of Am–G–Em–F.

== Critical reception ==
Professional ratings
Review scores
Source	Rating
Entertainment Weekly	A−
The Irish Times	2/5 stars
Stereogum	7/10

"We Belong Together" became a "career re-defining" song for Carey, at a point when many critics had considered her career over. Unlike most of Carey's recent singles at that time, "We Belong Together" was met with universal acclaim from critics, most of whom hailed the song as her "return to form", following reviews for Charmbracelet (2002), that suggested Carey had lost her signature vocal range and power. Sal Cinquemani of Slant Magazine wrote "the... diva [keeps] cool with breathy, rapid-fire verses until the final full strong-voiced climax that... proves that 'The Voice' has indeed returned." Additionally, he said that "The song is as 'innovative' as Mariah has been in years." Other critics commended Carey on her novel singing style which, according to Kelefa Sanneh of The New York Times, gave the song its propulsion, writing "This style is part of the reason why she has been able to turn a ballad into a summer smash. 'We Belong Together' doesn't have a guest rapper, or a hard-hitting beat, but Ms. Carey's tricky vocal lines give the song more propulsion than you'd expect, with tightly coiled counter-rhythms that tug against the beat." Johnny Loftus from Metro Times called it a "summer hit" and wrote "We all know it’s the intangibles that make a summer single anyway, those untraceable currents that grab the heart and feet, and despite not being an anthem, 'We Belong Together' is that rousing."

Writing for Vibe, Michael Ehrlich claimed the song would "cut across generations", while Cinquemani felt it would revive "faith in Mariah the balladeer". Stephen Thomas Erlewine from AllMusic chose "We Belong Together" as a "top Pick" from the album, while Todd Burns from Stylus Magazine described it as "beautifully cadenced". Echoing Cinquemani's comments about the song and Carey's past as a balladeer, Jozen Cummings from PopMatters wrote "Carey makes the song her own, reminding fans of her 'Hero' days with full, throaty vocals and a crashing climax at the end. The dichotomy between 'The Emancipation of Mimi's' first two tracks is the album’s bread and butter." Since first hearing the song on the radio, Sherri Winston from South Florida Sun-Sentinel claimed she "knew it would be a smash", complimenting its understated beat and Carey's vocals. Billboard's Michael Paoletta described "We Belong Together" as one of the album's strongest cuts, claiming that it highlighted the strongest focal point on the song: Carey's voice. Slant Magazine ranked it 2nd on their best songs of 2005 list.

=== Accolades ===
Accolades for "We Belong Together"
Publication	Accolade	Rank	Ref.
Rolling Stone	The 100 Greatest R&B Songs of the 21st Century	5	
Billboard	The 500 Best Pop Songs	199	

== Chart performance ==
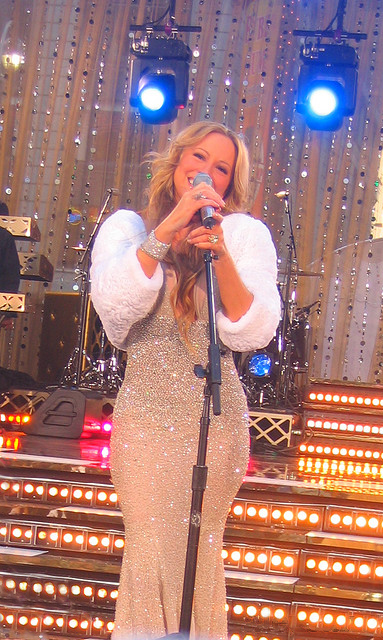
Carey performing "We Belong Together" on Good Morning America

Between 2001 and 2004, Carey's popularity had substantially declined and many had considered her career as over. "We Belong Together" proved to be both Carey's comeback single and a massive commercial success. The song spent fourteen nonconsecutive weeks at number one on the US Billboard Hot 100—after making its debut at number 81—and fourteen consecutive weeks at number one on the Hot R&B/Hip-Hop Songs chart. It had major cross-over success, becoming the first song to simultaneously occupy the number one position on nine Billboard charts on the week ending August 6, 2005: the Hot 100, Billboard Hot 100 Airplay, Hot R&B/Hip-Hop Songs, Hot R&B/Hip-Hop Airplay, Pop 100 Airplay, Top 40 Mainstream, Rhythmic Airplay Chart, Hot Dance Club Songs, and the Hot Ringtones charts. Spending fourteen weeks atop the Hot 100, "We Belong Together" became one of the longest running number-one songs in US chart history, behind only Carey's 1995 collaboration with Boyz II Men, "One Sweet Day", which spent sixteen weeks at number one. Aside from its chart success, the song broke several airplay records, and according to Mediabase and Nielsen BDS, gathered both the largest one-day and one-week audiences in BDS history, reaching 32.8 million and 223 million impressions respectively. This record was held until it was broken by Robin Thicke's "Blurred Lines" in 2013, with 234.65 million listeners on July 28.

During the week of September 25, 2005, Carey set another record, becoming the first female to occupy the first two spots atop the Hot 100, as "We Belong Together" remained at number one, and her next single, "Shake It Off", held the number two spot. Additionally, the song held the top position on the official Hot 100 Airplay chart for sixteen weeks, tying for the second all time spot with No Doubt's "Don't Speak" (1996). "We Belong Together" was certified 6× Platinum by the Recording Industry Association of America (RIAA), denoting shipments of 6 million copies throughout the United States. On the Billboard Hot 100 Year-end Chart of 2005, the song was declared the number one song, a career first for Carey. Billboard listed "We Belong Together" ninth on the Billboard Hot 100 All-Time Top Songs and second on Top Billboard Hot 100 R&B/Hip-Hop Songs. On the Hot 100, "We Belong Together" spent twenty-three consecutive weeks in the Top 10 and forty-three weeks total on the chart, making it Carey's longest running Top 10 song and her longest charting hit at the time. The song was also declared the most popular song of the 2000s decade by Billboard, which makes Carey the first artist to have more than one song being the most popular of a decade, as "One Sweet Day" was the most popular song of the 1990s.

Besides its success in the United States, "We Belong Together" achieved strong charting throughout Europe and Australia. On the ARIA Charts, the song debuted atop the singles chart in Australia during the week dated July 3, 2005. The following week, it held the number-one spot for a second week, and stayed on the chart for a total of eleven weeks. To date, "We Belong Together" was certified Platinum by the Australian Recording Industry Association (ARIA), denoting shipments of 70,000 units. The song finished at number 17 on the 2005 Australian Year-End Chart. In both Flemish and Wallonian territories in Belgium, "We Belong Together" peaked at numbers 12 and 24, spending a total of fifteen and fourteen weeks fluctuating in the singles chart, respectively. The song finished at number 47 on the Flemish Year-End Chart of 2005. "We Belong Together" made its debut at number 15 on the Danish Tracklisten chart during the week of August 7, 2005, eventually peaking at number 3. In France, the song peaked at number 12, and spent nineteen weeks fluctuating within the French singles chart. On the Dutch Top 40 chart, "We Belong Together" reached number one in its fourth week, and spent a total of sixteen weeks in the chart, four of which were at the number two position. The song finished at number 41 on the Dutch Year-End Chart of 2005. In New Zealand, the song spent three weeks at number two on the singles chart, and a total of twelve before making its exit on October 3, 2005. At the end of 2005, "We Belong Together" finished at number 36, and was certified Gold by the Recording Industry Association of New Zealand (RIANZ). In both Norway and Spain, the song peaked at number 9 and 3, and spent nine and seven weeks within the charts. In Switzerland, the song peaked at number 4 on the official singles chart, and charted for thirteen weeks. During mid-week predictions in the United Kingdom, "We Belong Together" was positioned to become Carey's third UK number-one single. However, it wound up debuting at number two on the UK Singles Chart. In its second week, the song dropped to number 3, before re-surfacing to number two in its third week, this time blocked by James Blunt's "You're Beautiful". The song spent a total of eighteen weeks within the singles chart, and has estimated sales of over 240,000 units in the United Kingdom.

== Awards and nominations ==
"We Belong Together" was awarded several prestigious music industry awards throughout 2005 and 2006. At the 2005 Billboard Music Awards ceremony, Carey won five awards, with the song receiving awards in the "Rhythmic Top 40 Title of the Year", "Hot 100 song of the Year" and "Hot 100 Airplay of the Year" categories. On November 6, 2005, Carey earned two awards for "We Belong Together" at the Radio Music Awards ceremony, in the "Song of the Year/Mainstream Hit Radio" and "Song of the Year/Urban and Rhythmic Radio" categories. Similarly, "We Belong Together" won the "Best R&B/Soul Single" and "Best R&B/Soul Single, Female" awards at the 20th annual Soul Train Music Awards, "Choice Love Song" at the Teen Choice Awards, "Best R&B Song" at the Vibe Awards, and "World's Most-Played Single" at the 2005 World Music Awards.

At the 48th Annual Grammy Awards, held at the Shrine Auditorium on February 8, 2006, Carey was nominated for eight awards, the most she had received in one night throughout her career. "We Belong Together" was nominated for Song of the Year and Record of the Year; however, it won two awards: "Best R&B Song" and "Best Female R&B Vocal Performance". The song was named "Song of the Year" at the ASCAP Awards, and "Song of the Year", "Most Performed Song" and "Number-one Billboard Song" at the BMI Awards. Towards the summer of 2006, Carey took home "Song of the Year", "Best Pop Female Song Performance" and "Best R&B/Soul Female Song Performance" at the GrooveVolt Music & Fashion Awards.

== Remixes ==
Carey recorded an official remix version for "We Belong Together", which she produced with DJ Clue. The remix is recorded in D-Major (one step up from the original in C-Major) and Carey’s vocals range from B3-E6. The remix features vocals from rappers Jadakiss and Styles P, two-thirds of the hip-hop trio the Lox. The remix is fundamentally different from the original, described as having "a faster, springier backbeat" by Kelefa Sanneh of The New York Times. Lyrically, the song is similar to the album version of the song, in which both rappers' verses contemplate on past memories. Styles P raps "Past is the past, just let it be bygones / Matter of fact I know a fly song that we could vibe on", which Sanneh writes "Cheerfully out of place, he sounds like a man who has wandered into the wrong summertime party, but so what? He figures he might as well stick around and enjoy it." In two separate reviews of The Emancipation of Mimi, Sanneh referred to the song as both "great" and "excellent", in regards to the remix.

Aside from the album version's main remix, several others were commissioned and released, although none contained new vocals from Carey. Peter Rauhofer created the "Reconstruction Mix/Club Mix" and "Atlantic Soul Vocal Mix", which both feature a synthetic bass line, a piano and guitar line, and distinctive hi-hats that produce a more up-tempo, hard-hitting beat.

On February 17, 2021, Carey released a new version of the song, the "Mimi's Late Night Valentine's Mix", in EP format, along with a seven-minute extended version of the song. Then, four days prior to the release, she performed on Live with Kelly and Ryan.

== Music video ==
=== Background ===
The song's music video premiered worldwide on April 11, 2005, although MSN offered an exclusive look at the music video on April 9. Carey's "We Belong Together" is Yahoo! Music's most watched video of 2005 with 7.5 million streamed performances. The video was shot by film director Brett Ratner in Los Angeles alongside the video for Carey's previous single, "It's Like That". Carey had collaborated with Ratner several times in the past, having worked on the video for "Heartbreaker", which became one of the most expensive of all time, costing an estimated $2.5 million. The video was filmed through February 9 to 10, 2005, in conjunction with "It's Like That" and serves as the second half to the two-part story. The music video for "It's Like That" features Carey at her bachelorette party set to wed an older and powerful man, played by Eric Roberts. Towards the end of the video, her ex-lover, played by Wentworth Miller, arrives at the event, and the video concludes with them staring into each other's eyes as Carey's soon-to-be husband watches from a balcony. The video for "We Belong Together" finishes their tale of love, and features Carey on her wedding day. For the scenes of Carey's wedding to the older man, she wore her Vera Wang gown she originally wore during her nuptials to Tommy Mottola in 1993. In an interview with MSNBC, when asked if there was a connection to the use of the dress in the video and reality, Carey responded:

The wedding dress was a Vera Wang original dress from a while ago that I actually wore on a certain occasion and had it in storage and when we came up with the concept for the video that had the element of a wedding in it, I said, ‘well, I do have my old wedding dress,’. 'It’s still worth [sic] for me ’cause I can’t believe I was ever married but whatever, end of story. And I knew that we wouldn’t be able to get a fabulous dress like in two days so I just took that dress out of the storage – it has a 27-foot train and it was just all hand-beaded and stuff and so I figured we might as well get a use out of it.'

=== Synopsis ===
In the music video, Carey wore her wedding dress from her nuptials to Tommy Mottola in 1993. She is seen running from the altar, alongside her lover (Wentworth Miller), in the video's climactic scene.

The video features Carey readying for her wedding, and follows her to the altar, as well as her escape from the reception. Many of the actors featured in Carey's "It's Like That" video were in that of "We Belong Together", which was shot as a continuation from the "It's Like That" video. It begins with a scene of a large mansion, apparently owned by the older man who she is to marry. Carey is seen walking barefoot in a room, shedding a black sheer robe and laying down on a bed draped with white linens. Dressed in lingerie, Carey's face is shown close-up, as scenes of her tossing in the bed are shown. As the song begins, Carey is seen sitting in front of a large mirror, preparing for her wedding by putting on earrings and shoes, and staring at the ring on her finger. Additional scenes of Carey sitting on a small blue sofa, wearing a purple dress, and Carey staring at the camera during a shower moment are interspersed. The wedding is then shown, with Miller approaching the reception through a stairwell in the back. Small children as seen throwing flowers on the white carpet, followed by Roberts and Carey walking down the aisle.

As Carey, now dry and clothed, is shown in another scenario following the dressing scene, a still of Carey and Miller in the video for "It's like That" is shown, during the lyrics "I can't sleep at night / When you are on my mind". After several other scenes of Carey dressed in the purple gown and white shirt are interspersed, the altar is displayed, where before being ordained by the minister (played by Faizon Love). Carey looks into her ex-lover's eyes once more. She turns to Roberts, and begins running towards Miller, leaving the reception. As the song's climax is reached, Carey and Miller are shown running from the reception, as the guests stand up in awe, and watch the pair leave. Carey, dressed in the white shirt, is shown with growing anticipation, crying to the camera and moving her hands and hair. Back at the wedding scene, Carey and her lover get into his vehicle, and drive away as her 27-foot train hangs behind the car.

=== Recognition ===
The video was nominated for "Best R&B Video" and "Best Female Video" at the 2005 MTV Video Music Awards. As of April 2026, the music video has accumulated over 772 million views on YouTube, making it Carey's highest viewed music video unrelated to Christmas, and her third-most-viewed video overall, behind two different versions of "All I Want for Christmas is You" (twice).

== Live performances ==
Due to its continued chart success, Carey performed "We Belong Together" on several live televised performances and included it on the set-lists of all of her tours after its release. In the United Kingdom, Carey filmed a two-part appearance on the British music program Top of the Pops, performing "It's Like That", "We Belong Together", and "Shake It Off". Additional European and Asian appearances included an interview on the French talk show Le Grand Journal, and a performance of "We Belong Together" on both Music Station and Riponggi Hills in Japan. After returning to the United States for a string of televised performances, Carey launched the release of the album on Good Morning America, in the form of a five-piece outdoor concert. The concert, taking place in Times Square and featuring the largest crowd in the plaza since the 2004 New Year's Eve celebration, featured the first three singles from the album, as well as "Fly Like a Bird" and "Make It Happen" (1991). The following week, she performed "We Belong Together" at the 2005 BET Awards, with an additional appearance at the annual VH1 Save the Music special, filmed live on April 17 from the Beacon Theatre. Throughout May, Carey appeared on several US television programs, performing "We Belong Together" on the Late Show with David Letterman (May 5), The Tonight Show with Jay Leno (May 11), and The Ellen DeGeneres Show (May 13), which included a performance of "It's Like That". As June approached, Carey made an appearance on The Oprah Winfrey Show (May 24), featuring a live rendition of "We Belong Together". She appeared on stage wearing a long blue evening gown, and featured a four piece band, as well as three background vocalists.

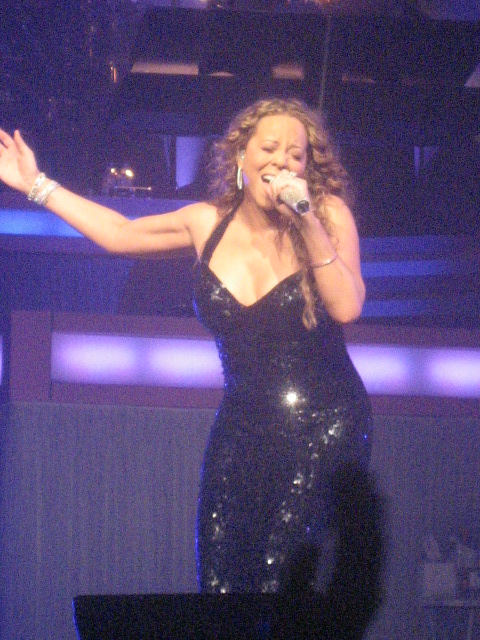
Carey performing "We Belong Together" on her Angels Advocate Tour

The following week, Carey made a live appearance at the 2005 MTV Movie Awards. The recital aired on television in black and white format, with Carey wearing a red Armani Privé and sporting a retro curled hairstyle, appearing in color. She performed "We Belong Together" on a white runway-styled stage with four male and female dancers. Following the stateside promotion of the album, Carey traveled to the United Kingdom on July 2, 2005, for a benefit concert held in Hyde Park, London titled Live 8. The televised event was watched by over 9.6 million British citizens and held a live audience of over 200,000. Carey performed a three song set-list, opening with "Make It Happen" and "Hero", which featured a live choir of African children, and followed by "We Belong Together". On July 4, she performed at the annual Macy's 4th of July Fireworks, singing "America the Beautiful" and "We Belong Together". On August 3, USA Today announced that Carey would be added to the roster of performers at the 2005 MTV Video Music Awards, held on the 28th of the month. The ceremony was held at the American Airlines Arena in downtown Miami Beach Florida, with Carey's performance taking place at the National Hotel in South Beach. Apart from the Killers, she was the only performer to tape their appearance from an undisclosed location in Miami. After being introduced by Eva Longoria, Carey appeared on a long stage in the hotel's courtyard, with Dupri opening the song in a nearby cabana. After performing "Shake It Off" and the official remix version of "We Belong Together", Carey made her way into the shallow pool, followed by Dupri and the back-up dancers. Following the awards ceremony, Carey once again took to Europe, being featured as a head-lining performer at the 2005 Fashion Rocks, held in Monaco. Following her introduction by Donatella Versace, Carey performed the Peter Rauhofer Remix for "We Belong Together" on a suspended rafter, while wearing a metallic Versace gown. Carey played a similarly-choreographed performance of the song's Peter Rauhofer Remix at the German Bambi Awards, held in October 2005. Two months later, she celebrated the new year on television, placing as the featured performer at the Times Square Ball drop on New Year's Eve in New York. The special, titled Dick Clark's New Year's Rockin' Eve with Ryan Seacrest, aired on ABC at 10 pm on December 31, and featured Carey on stage wearing a short sparkling dress, and performing a selection of the album's singles.

At the 48th Grammy Awards, held on February 8, 2006, Carey was nominated for eight awards—the most she had ever received in one night. That night, Carey returned to the Grammy stage for the first time since 1996. Her performance opened with a pre-taped video in which she discussed the importance of God and religion in her life. Carey then came to the stage, dressed in a white Chanel gown, and sang a shortened version of "We Belong Together". Next, Carey's pastor Clarence Keaton read a Bible passage to open Carey's performance of "Fly Like a Bird", as he did in the studio recording of the song. Midway through the song, a black temporary wall was removed, revealing a large choir who joined Carey for the song's gospel climax. The performance earned the night's only standing ovation, prompting Teri Hatcher, who was presenting the next award, to exclaim, "It's like we've all just been saved!" Carey's performance earned rave reviews from critics. Gary Susman from Entertainment Weekly called Carey the "comeback queen", noting that her voice "soar[ed] into the rafters like only Carey's can." Carey included "We Belong Together" on both succeeding tours following its release, the Adventures of Mimi and Angels Advocate Tours. On the former, the song was featured as the encore number, with Carey re-entering the arenas in a form fitting beige evening gown. Backed by three background vocalists, Trey Lorenz, Sherry Tatum, and MaryAnn Tatum, Carey began the song as confetti dropped the arena rafters. According to Jennifer Vineyard from MTV News, the performance was "a major accomplishment", and the highlight of the show, and found Carey re-connect with the audience in ways that she was unable throughout most of the show. Similarly, during her Angel's Advocate Tour, the song was placed as one of the final numbers on the set-list. Dressed in a black Herve Leger gown, Carey introduced the song as the Billboard's "song of the decade", and thanked the audience for making it her sixteenth number-one single in the United States. Following the song's completion, Carey exited the arena for a few moments, before returning to perform "Hero" as the encore.

On February 12, 2021, Carey performed the song live on Live with Kelly and Ryan ahead of Valentine's Day with a new live mix entitled the "Mimi's Late Night Valentine’s Mix".

== Formats and track listings ==
- Digital download
1. "We Belong Together" – 3:22
- Digital download – remix
1. "We Belong Together" (Remix feat. Jadakiss & Styles P.) – 4:24
- Japanese CD single
1. "We Belong Together" – 3:23
2. "We Belong Together" (Instrumental) – 3:22
- Australian limited edition CD single
1. "We Belong Together" (Main Version) – 3:23
2. "We Belong Together" (Reconstruction Radio Mix) – 4:06
3. "It's Like That" (Remix feat. Fat Joe) – 3:31
- Thai limited edition maxi-CD single
1. "We Belong Together" (Album Version) – 3:21
2. "We Belong Together" (Reconstruction Radio Mix) – 4:05
3. "We Belong Together" (Reconstruction Club Mix) – 9:29
4. "We Belong Together" (Atlantic Soul Radio Edit) – 4:27
5. "We Belong Together" (Atlantic Soul Vocal) – 7:24
6. "We Belong Together" (Atlantic Soul Instrumental) – 7:24
- UK CD single
1. "We Belong Together" (Album Version) – 3:22
2. "We Belong Together" (Reconstruction Radio Mix) – 4:05
3. "We Belong Together" (Reconstruction Club Mix) – 9:29
4. "We Belong Together" (Atlantic Soul Vocal) – 7:24
5. "We Belong Together" (Atlantic Soul Instrumental) – 7:24
- European CD single
1. "We Belong Together" (Main Version) – 3:22
2. "We Belong Together" (Remix feat. Jadakiss & Styles P.) – 4:24
- European enhanced maxi-CD single
1. "We Belong Together" (Main Version) – 3:22
2. "We Belong Together" (Reconstruction Radio Mix) – 4:05
3. "It's Like That" (Remix feat. Fat Joe) – 3:30
4. "We Belong Together" (Video)
- UK & European 12-inch picture disc

A1. "We Belong Together" (Album Version) – 3:22
A2. "We Belong Together" (Remix feat. Jadakiss & Styles P.) – 4:30
A1. "It's Like That" (Remix feat. Fat Joe) – 3:32
B2. "We Belong Together" (Reconstruction Radio Mix) – 4:05

- US 12-inch vinyl – remix

A1. "We Belong Together" (Main) – 4:27
A2. "We Belong Together" (Instrumental) – 4:28
B1. "We Belong Together" (Main) – 4:27
B2. "We Belong Together" (Instrumental) – 4:28

- We Belong Together EP
1. "We Belong Together" (Remix feat. Jadakiss and Styles P.) – 4:27
2. "We Belong Together" (Peter Rauhofer Reconstruction Mix) – 9:31
3. "We Belong Together" (Peter Rauhofer Radio Mix) – 4:08
4. "We Belong Together" (Peter Rauhofer Club Mix) – 9:41
5. "We Belong Together" (Atlantic Soul Vocal Mix) – 7:25
6. "We Belong Together" (Atlantic Soul Radio Mix) – 4:22
7. "We Belong Together" (Atlantic Soul Instrumental) – 7:24
- We Belong Together (Mimi's Late Night Valentine's Mix)
1. "We Belong Together" (Mimi's Late Night Valentine's Mix) [Extended] – 7:18
2. "We Belong Together" (Mimi's Late Night Valentine's Mix) – 3:12

== Credits and personnel ==
Credits for The Emancipation of Mimi are adapted from the album's liner notes.

- Mariah Carey – songwriting, producer, lead vocals, background vocals
- Jermaine Dupri – songwriting, producer
- Manuel Seal – songwriting, producer
- Johntá Austin – songwriting
- Bobby Womack – songwriting (interpolation)
- Patrick Moten – songwriting (interpolation)
- Kenneth Edmonds – songwriting (interpolation)
- Darnell Bristol – songwriting (interpolation)
- Sandra Sully – songwriting (interpolation)
- Brian Frye – engineer
- Herb Power – mastering

== Charts ==
=== Weekly charts ===
==== Original version ====
Weekly chart performance for "We Belong Together"
Chart (2005–06)	Peak position
Australia (ARIA)	1
Australia Club (ARIA) Rauhofer mix	27
Australian Urban (ARIA)	1
Austria (Ö3 Austria Top 40)	31
Belgium (Ultratop 50 Flanders)	12
Belgium (Ultratop 50 Wallonia)	24
Brazil (Crowley Broadcast Analysis)	71
Canada AC (Billboard)	21
Canada AC (Radio & Records)	3
Canada CHR/Pop (Radio & Records)	1
Canada Hot AC (Radio & Records)	6
Croatia (HRT)	1
Denmark (Tracklisten)	3
El Salvador (Notimex)	5
Europe (European Hot 100 Singles)	4
France (SNEP)	12
Germany (GfK)	11
Greece (IFPI)	28
Hungary (Single Top 40)	5
Iceland (Íslenski Listinn Topp 20)	17
Ireland (IRMA)	3
Italy (FIMI)	25
Netherlands (Dutch Top 40)	2
Netherlands (Single Top 100)	3
New Zealand (Recorded Music NZ)	2
Norway (VG-lista)	9
Panama (Notimex)	2
Poland Airplay (ZPAV)	1
Romania (Romanian Top 100)	30
Russia Airplay (TopHit)	29
Scottish Singles Sales (Official Charts)	6
South Africa Airplay (EMA)	1
Spain (Promusicae)	3
Sweden (Sverigetopplistan)	11
Switzerland (Schweizer Hitparade)	4
UK Singles (Official Charts)	2
UK Hip Hop/R&B (Official Charts)	1
UK Club (Music Week) Reconstruction/Atlantic Soul mixes	3
UK Pop Club (Music Week) Reconstruction/Atlantic Soul mixes	2
UK Urban Club (Music Week)	1
US Billboard Hot 100	1
US Adult Contemporary (Billboard)	3
US Adult Pop Airplay (Billboard)	16
US Dance Club Songs (Billboard) P. Rauhofer/Atlantic Soul Mixes	1
US Dance Airplay (Billboard)	1
US Hot R&B/Hip-Hop Songs (Billboard)	1
US Pop Airplay (Billboard)	1
US Pop 100 (Billboard)	1
US Rhythmic Airplay (Billboard)	1
US Smooth Jazz Airplay (Billboard)	11
US Adult Contemporary (Radio & Records)	3
US CHR/Pop (Radio & Records)	1
US CHR/Rhythmic (Radio & Records)	1
US Hot AC (Radio & Records)	16
US Smooth Jazz (Radio & Records)	18
US Urban (Radio & Records)	1
US Urban AC (Radio & Records)	1

2010 weekly chart performance for "We Belong Together"
Chart (2010)	Peak position
South Korea International (Gaon)	49

2021 weekly chart performance for "We Belong Together"
Chart (2021)	Peak position
UK Singles Downloads (Official Charts)	74
US Digital Song Sales (Billboard)	40

==== Mimi's Late Night Valentine's Mix ====
Weekly chart performance for "We Belong Together"
Chart (2021)	Peak position
US Digital Song Sales (Billboard)	45

=== Year-end charts ===
Year-end chart performance for "We Belong Together"
Chart (2005)	Position
Australia (ARIA)	17
Australian Urban (ARIA)	10
Belgium (Ultratop 50 Flanders)	47
Brazil (Crowley)	15
Canada CHR (Radio & Records)	8
CIS (TopHit)	112
Europe (European Hot 100 Singles)	45
Germany (Media Control GfK)	92
Netherlands (Dutch Top 40)	22
Netherlands (Single Top 100)	41
New Zealand (RIANZ)	36
Russia Airplay (TopHit)	89
Sweden (Hitlistan)	57
Switzerland (Schweizer Hitparade)	57
UK Singles (OCC)	20
UK Urban Club (Music Week)	34
US Billboard Hot 100	1
US Adult Contemporary (Billboard)	16
US Adult Top 40 (Billboard)	47
US Dance Club Play (Billboard) P. Rauhofer/Atlantic Soul Mixes	3
US Hot Dance Airplay (Billboard)	9
US Hot R&B/Hip-Hop Songs (Billboard)	2
US Mainstream Top 40 (Billboard)	3
US Pop 100 (Billboard)	3
US Rhythmic Airplay (Billboard)	1
US Adult Contemporary (Radio & Records)	20
US CHR/Pop (Radio & Records)	3
US CHR/Rhythmic (Radio & Records)	1
US Hot AC (Radio & Records)	53
US Smooth Jazz (Radio & Records)	70
US Urban (Radio & Records)	1
US Urban AC (Radio & Records)	5

Chart (2006)	Position
Canada AC (Billboard)	17

=== Decade-end charts ===
Decade-end chart performance for "We Belong Together"
Chart (2000–2009)	Position
US Billboard Hot 100	1
US Hot R&B/Hip-Hop Songs (Billboard)	2
US Mainstream Top 40 (Billboard)	17

=== All-time charts ===
All-time chart performance for "We Belong Together"
Chart	Position
US Billboard Hot 100	15
US Billboard Hot 100 (Women)	4
US Hot R&B/Hip-Hop Songs (Billboard)	11
US Mainstream Top 40 (Billboard)	92

== Certifications ==
Certifications for "We Belong Together"
Region	Certification	Certified units/sales
Australia (ARIA)	Platinum	70,000^{^}
Brazil (Pro-Música Brasil)	Platinum	60,000^{‡}
Denmark (IFPI Danmark)	Gold	45,000^{‡}
New Zealand (RMNZ)	4× Platinum	120,000^{‡}
United Kingdom (BPI)	2× Platinum	1,200,000^{‡}
United States (RIAA)	7× Platinum	7,000,000^{‡}
United States (RIAA) Mastertone	Platinum	1,000,000^{*}
^{*} Sales figures based on certification alone.^{^} Shipments figures based on certification alone.^{‡} Sales+streaming figures based on certification alone.

== Release history ==
Release dates and formats for "We Belong Together"
Region	Date	Format	Label	Ref.
United States	March 15, 2005	Rhythmic contemporary radio	Island Def Jam	
United States	March 23, 2005	Digital download	Island Def Jam	
United States	March 29, 2005	Contemporary hit radio	Island Def Jam	
United States	May 17, 2005	Digital download (remix)	Island Def Jam	
United States	June 13, 2005	Hot adult contemporary radio	Island Def Jam	
Japan	June 15, 2005	CD	Universal Music Japan	
Australia	June 20, 2005	CD 1	Universal Music Australia	
Italy	June 27, 2005	—	Def Jam	
Spain	July 4, 2005	CD	Universal Music Spain	
United Kingdom	July 4, 2005	CD	Island Def Jam	
Australia	July 11, 2005	CD 2	Universal Music Australia	
Austria	July 11, 2005	CD	Universal	
Germany	July 11, 2005	CD	Island	
Poland	August 22, 2005	CD	Universal Music Polska	
Various	January 29, 2021	EP	Def Jam	

== See also ==
- List of number-one singles of 2005 (Australia)
- List of Billboard Hot 100 number-one singles of 2005
- List of number-one R&B singles of 2005 (U.S.)
- List of number-one dance singles of 2005 (U.S.)
- List of number-one dance airplay hits of 2005 (U.S.)
