= Patrick Moten =

American musician (1957–1999)

- Born: Patrick Lawrence Moten; March 17, 1957; Los Angeles, California. U.S.
- Died: November 22, 1999 (aged 42) Los Angeles, California. U.S.
- Genres: R&B, jazz
- Occupations: Musician, songwriter, producer
- Instruments: Piano, organ, keyboards

Patrick Lawrence Moten (March 17, 1957 – November 22, 1999) was an American musician, songwriter, producer, and arranger. He primarily performed on piano and organ. Moten was best known as the musical director for Bobby Womack and Gerald Albright. He also produced Anita Baker's debut album The Songtress.

== Life and career ==
Moten was born in Los Angeles, California on March 17, 1957. At an early age he displayed a remarkable interest and ability in music. He graduated from Westchester High School in 1975.

Moten studied classical music with Lucille B. Hughly and William Wilkins, but he switched to soul music after witnessing Billy Preston perform.

At age 15, Moten formed Manufactured Funk which included Ike & Tina Turner's son Ronnie Turner on bass. The band opened for acts such as Harold Melvin & the Blue Notes, Rufus, the Dramatics, the Young Hearts, Donny Hathaway, Natalie Cole, New Birth, the Undisputed Truth, and B.B. King, among others. He later traveled with Tina Turner on a worldwide tour as a keyboardist. Turner's ex-husband, Ike Turner, instructed Moten on recording and engineering at his Bolic Sound recording studio in Inglewood.

Through Ike Turner, he befriended Bobby Womack. Womack hired Moten as a co-producer and keyboardist for his album Roads of Life. He collaborated with Womack on many other projects, including the albums The Poet and The Poet II, and another with Sam Cooke's daughter, Linda Womack. Moten co-wrote Bobby Womack's "If You Think You're Lonely Now." Years later, he would be credited as a co-writer of Mariah Carey's "We Belong Together", when Carey would reuse portions of "If You Think You're Lonely Now" in "We Belong Together", which would win a Grammy Award in 2006 for R&B Song. Moten wrote "Love Has Finally Come At Last" for Bobby Womack and Patti LaBelle.

Moten produced Johnnie Taylor's Just Ain't Good Enough on Beverly Glen Records in 1982 (featuring "What About My Love"). The following year, he produced Anita Baker's debut album, The Songstress, and wrote most of the album's tracks. In 1987, he wrote several songs for Rosie Gaines' album No Sweeter Love (featuring the track "Crazy"), that was subsequently shelved at the time, later to be resurrected by the Expansion label in the UK in 2000.

Moten penned nearly 60 registered compositions. He toured with a jazz showcase featuring Joe Sample, Lalah Hathaway, and Gerald Albright. He also toured with Frankie Beverly and Maze, and additionally wrote tunes for Mica Paris, Tone Lōc and Sarah Vaughan. He continued the liaison with Anita Baker, co-writing "Rhythm of Love" on her 1994 album Rhythm of Love.

Moten resided in Los Angeles, California. He was a Prince Hall Freemason.

== Death ==
Moten died in Los Angeles from liver failure at the age of 42 on November 22, 1999. He was survived by his parents, Imogene and Booker T; his sister, Donna Lynn; and his brother, Steven Baldwin.
