= Sandra Sully (songwriter) =

American songwriter

Sandra Sully is an American former member of the all-female band from the 1970s, The Love Machine. She is also a songwriter.

== The Love Machine era ==
In the diverse landscape of music genres of the 1970s, The Love Machine was an all-female band that "specialized" mainly in funk music. The members of the band were Bernice Givens, Kathy Bradley, Mary Hopkins, Paulette Gibson, Renee Gentry, Sandra Sully and Sheila Dean. The Love Machine performed in Europe, Asia, and Africa for many years, recording with and releasing albums under many labels, such as Arista, Buddah, le trois Musketeers, Phillips, Barclay, and Motown.

== Songwriter ==
Sully co-wrote Bobby Womack's "If You Think You're Lonely Now". In 2006 she was credited as a co-writer of Mariah Carey's Grammy Award–winning song "We Belong Together" which incorporated part of "If You're Think You're Lonely Now". She received a Grammy certificate for "We Belong Together" and the BMI "Song of the Decade" award. The album "The Emancipation of Mimi" sold over ten million copies worldwide.

Sully also co-wrote "Angel" ,"Sometimes", and "Will You Be Mine?" for Anita Baker, as well as "Just Ain't Good Enough" for Johnnie Taylor. She was previously a member of The Love Machine, a 1970s international all-female singing and dancing group. Sully co-wrote songs for the soundtrack of the movie Getting Over featuring The Love Machine.

She has received gold records for The Best of Anita Baker and The Makings of a Man by Jaheim, and "Love in the Future" by John Legend. Introducing The Style Council the album by the British pop group also earned a gold record. The soundtrack for Jason's Lyric which included "If You Think You're Lonely Now" earned a platinum record.

Sully has also written three novels, What Price the Carrot? from I Universe Press and The Entertainer and Perhaps My Sister is Free on Friday from Outskirts Press.

She is a member of the Broadcast Music Inc, The Society of Composers & Lyricists, The Association of Independent Music Publishers, The Harry Fox Agency, (SONA) Songwriters of North America, National Music Publishers Association and a voting member of the Recording Academy.

Sully studied Television Production at Los Angeles City College, Los Angeles, California and Voice with Seth Riggs and Olga James, actress and wife of Cannonball Adderley.
