= Play This Song =

2025 single by Mariah Carey featuring Anderson .Paak

Single by Mariah Carey featuring Anderson .Paak

from the album Here for It All
- Released: September 26, 2025
- Studio: Conway (Los Angeles, CA); Honey Snow (Aspen, CO)
- Genre: R&B
- Length: 3:44
- Label: Gamma
- Songwriters: Mariah Carey; Brandon Paak Anderson; Daniel Moore II; Jarius Mozee; Jason Pounds; Kenya Rae Johnson
- Producers: Mariah Carey; N.W.I.; Daniel Moore II

Mariah Carey singles chronology
"Sugar Sweet" (2025)	"Play This Song" (2025)	"Nothing Is Impossible" (2026)

Anderson .Paak singles chronology
"Too Bad" (2025)	"Play This Song" (2025)

Music video
- "Play This Song" on YouTube

"Play This Song" is a song by American singer-songwriter Mariah Carey featuring fellow American singer-songwriter Anderson .Paak. It was released on September 26, 2025, as the third single from Carey's sixteenth studio album, Here for It All (2025), through her own imprint, Mariah, and the media company Gamma. Written in collaboration between Carey and Paak, the song also has Daniel Moore II, Jarius Mozee, Jason Pounds and Kenya Rae Johnson sharing writing credits. Production was handled by Carey, Moore II, Paak, Mozee and Pounds (billed as NWI). Sonically, the song is derived from 70's music and Motown sound, while also being an R&B song.

"Play This Song" has lyrics of a push-and-pull between two estranged lovers with a sour yet subtle message of giving up on someone, while also trying to reigniting the relationship. Most music critics compared the sound to that of musical superduo Silk Sonic, Paak's collaborative work with Bruno Mars, with their chemistry being the object of praise. Commercially, the track became the third top twenty entry from Here for It All on the US Billboard Hot R&B Songs chart, reaching number 11. A music video for the song premiered on September 26, 2025, while both performed the song on The Tonight Show Starring Jimmy Fallon three days later.

== Background and release ==
Paak first revealed that he was working on new music with Carey during an interview with Track Star in May 2025, where he wore a Mariah Carey T-shirt from her merch collection, and revealed that he was working on new music with the singer for her upcoming album. Upon Carey revealing the tracklist of Here for It All via social media on August 27, 2025, it was confirmed that Paak would be featured on a track on the album titled "Play This Song". Commenting on the collaboration in September 2025, Carey spoke to Gayle King on CBS Mornings, where she described Paak as "brilliant" and "a really a great artist". As confirmed by Forbes contributor Chris Malone Méndez, the song is "a working relationship birthed out of both her and her son’s love for Silk Sonic."

On September 23, three days prior to the release date of Here for It All, Carey announced via her social media that "Play This Song" would officially be released on September 26, the same day as the album, alongside its music video. On September 25, Carey was interviewed by Vogue, where she described the song as being a "kind of a ha-ha to whatever person", and "an "I'm giving up on this situation" type thing". On September 27, Billboard reported that the track is Carey's latest single from the album, following "Type Dangerous" and "Sugar Sweet".

== Composition ==
"Play This Song" was written in collaboration between Mariah Carey and Anderson Paak, who also duet. Daniel Moore II, Jarius Mozee, Jason Pounds and Kenya Rae Johnson also share writing credits. Production was handled by Carey, Moore II and NWi (consisted of Paak, Mozee and Pounds). It is an R&B song, with influences of funk and soul, and has been described as one of the "groovier moments" on Here for It All. It features "swirling" production, live drums, and "relaxed" arrangements. Additionally, Alexa Camp of Slant Magazine described "Play This Song" as a "throwback to '70s soul", while some critics noted "inflections of Motown". (Note: Attributed to Paste, Entertainment Focus and PopMatters.) In another light, Reid Sperisen of The Daily Bruin saw the blend of "twinkling chimes and warm keys" to be reminiscent of 2023's Victoria Monét’s Jaguar II album.

Lyrically, "Play This Song" is "a push-and-pull between Carey and .Paak as they circle around a relationship that’s ended but on the verge of reigniting." Rich Juzwiak of Pitchfork founded "a certain sourness, or bubbling rage even" in its lyrics, where Carey urges an estranged lover to "Listen by yourself, please listen by your damn self."

== Critical reception ==
Critics were favorable towards the blend of the two voices. Renowned for Sound writer Ryan Bulbeck described it as "a lavish and richly arranged tune, featuring [Paak]'s soulful vocals melding wonderfully with Carey's. Correspondingly, the description of the duet by Sperisen of The Daily Bruin stressed as the "finest collaboration" on the album, highlighting that the "chemistry between the Silk Sonic member's vocals and Carey's luscious lilts leaves the lyrics to play second fiddle, but this is no concern when the song's rich, luxurious '70s vibe is so heavenly." Mark Chappelle from Albumism wrote "Paak's vintage grooves propel Carey well", seeing influences on Carey's own songs, such as "Mine Again", "Circles", and "I Wish You Knew", all from The Emancipation Of Mimi (2005). The latter song was also cited as an influence by Pip Elwood of Entertainment Focus. Both Andy Kellman of Allmusic and Puah Ziwei of NME picked it as a highlight from the album, with Kellman perceiving "strong evocations of early-'70s soul", while "Paak tamps down his histrionics", and Ziewi mostly praising it sonically. The Arts Desk's Joe Muggs stated that "duetting with .Paak over the ultra-jazz chords of 'Play This Song' [...] is absolutely world class." Peter Piatkowski of PopMatters characterized it as "a summery love ballad reminiscent of the starry-eyed love duets of the 1970s Motown era," mostly Diana Ross and Marvin Gaye or Stevie Wonder and Syreeta Wright.

Many critics noted that the song is stylistic closest to his collaborative work with Bruno Mars on Silk Sonic. (Note: Attributed to Paste, Billboard, Albumism Allmusic Rolling Stone and USA Today.) Melissa Ruggieri from USA Today suggested it was "a sly homage to The Stylistics' "You Are Everything" that spotlights .Paak's Silk Sonic feel." Andy Steiner of Paste commented on the inspiration, calling it "derivative" and that it "mimick[s] Stax Records style but not its rhythmic adventurousness." He also noted "Carey's melodies and .Paak's rhythms could use a bit more gas." Similarly, Tim Chan wrote for Rolling Stone that "it's neither as memorable or playful as advertised." Placing it at number 6 while ranking the 11 tracks on Here for It All, Heran Mamo of Billboard declared: "Its Philly soul sound makes "Play This Song" sound like a leftover Silk Sonic song, but with MC taking Bruno Mars' mic — and that's not necessarily a bad thing. Carey is right: The two indeed have great musical chemistry [...], as her syrupy, swoon-worthy tone and the warm, raspy texture of .Paak's voice come together in perfect harmony.

== Music video ==
The song's music video premiered on September 26, 2025, and was directed by Paak. Hannah Dailey of Billboard described the video as a "black-and-white visual [showing] Carey and the Silk Sonic musician looking glamorous in chic blazers while singing to one another inside a luxurious mansion", where the two "[appear] absolutely enamored with one another". Furthermore, Eliza Thompson of Us Weekly defined it as a "flirty" music video, while Jovita Trujillo from ¡Hola! magazine declared "their chemistry is undeniable."

== Live performances ==
On September 29, 2025, Carey appeared on The Tonight Show Starring Jimmy Fallon, where she performed "Play This Song" for the first time, alongside Paak and hip hop band The Roots. Commenting on the performance, Emily Zemler of Rolling Stone stated: "The singer, clad in a gold gown, took center stage to showcase the song with the help of Paak, who played the grand piano alongside her". Gil Kaufman of Billboard praised the performance, highlighting the moment "when she pushed her vocals into her power range." The song was also part of the setlist of her fifteenth concert tour The Celebration of Mimi commencing in 2025.

== Charts ==
Chart performance for "Play This Song"
Chart (2025)	Peak position
Germany Urban (Deutsche Black Charts)	2
Japan Hot Overseas (Billboard Japan)	5
New Zealand Hot Singles (RMNZ)	36
US Hot R&B Songs (Billboard)	11
US R&B/Hip-Hop Digital Songs (Billboard)	12

== Release history ==
"Play This Song" release history
Region	Date	Format	Label	Ref.
Various	September 26, 2025	Digital download; streaming	Gamma	
