= Here for It All =

2025 studio album by Mariah Carey

Studio album by Mariah Carey
- Released: September 26, 2025
- Studios: Larrabee Sound (Los Angeles, California); Honeywest (Los Angeles, California); Conway (Los Angeles, California); Honey Snow (Aspen, Colorado); Electric Lady (New York City, New York); Honeyeast (Connecticut); Second Take Sound (New York City, New York); Westlake (Los Angeles, California); The Butterfly Lounge (Atlanta, Georgia)
- Genres: Pop; R&B
- Length: 39:45
- Labels: Mariah; Gamma
- Producers: Mariah Carey; the Stereotypes; 9AM; N.W.I.; Daniel Moore II; Harv; Anderson .Paak; Rogét & Alissia; Bongo ByTheWay

Mariah Carey chronology
Mariah Carey's Magical Christmas Special (Apple TV+ Original Soundtrack) (2020)	Here for It All (2025)

Singles from Here for It All
- 1. "Type Dangerous" Released: June 6, 2025; 2. "Sugar Sweet" Released: July 25, 2025; 3. "Play This Song" Released: September 26, 2025; 4. "Nothing Is Impossible" Released: January 12, 2026; 5. "In Your Feelings" Released: January 27, 2026; 6. "Jesus I Do" Released: January 27, 2026

Here for It All is the sixteenth studio album by American singer-songwriter Mariah Carey. It was released on September 26, 2025, through her imprint Mariah and the media company Gamma. The album sees Carey experimenting with pop and R&B sounds influenced by funk, disco, soul, and gospel. Lyrically, Here for It All moves between themes of love, vulnerability and faith, while also reflecting Carey’s confidence and personal strength. It features collaborations with Anderson .Paak, Kehlani, Shenseea, and the Clark Sisters.

The album was preceded by the singles "Type Dangerous" and "Sugar Sweet" (featuring Kehlani and Shenseea), the former of which became Carey's fiftieth entry on the US Billboard Hot 100. Four further singles were released from the album: "Play This Song" (featuring Anderson .Paak), "Nothing Is Impossible", "In Your Feelings", and "Jesus I Do" (featuring the Clark Sisters). Commercially, Here for It All charted within the top twenty in Australia, Scotland, Switzerland, the United States, and Wallonia. It also reached the top forty in Germany, Poland, Croatia, Spain, and the United Kingdom.

Upon release, Here for It All received generally positive reviews, with music critics praising Carey's vocals and the album's lyrical content, though some criticism was aimed towards the album's production. Carey promoted Here for It All through various talk show, award ceremony, and festival appearances, and the international leg of her tour, The Celebration of Mimi (2025).

== Background and release ==
Following the release of Mariah Carey's fifteenth studio album, Caution (2018), she went on to release various special anniversary editions of past albums from her discography. She also released the compilation album The Rarities (2020), as part of the 30th anniversary of her debut album, and the television special Mariah Carey's Magical Christmas Special (2020) and its accompanying soundtrack.

In November 2023, Carey revealed to Entertainment Tonight that she was working on a new album, and had about 10 songs ready to release. She noted that the album would reflect her personal journey particularly over the past decade, describing it as "summer-y". In June 2025, Carey began posting teasers on her social media, including a clip where she is listening to a track called "T:D_MC16.mp3" and her car's license plate reads "MC16". The album's lead single, "Type Dangerous", followed on June 6, marking Carey's first release under Gamma, following her multi-album deal with the media company.

On July 20, 2025, she released a 37-second montage on her social media platforms celebrating her discography. The following day, Carey revealed the album artwork through a short teaser video in which she appears strutting in spike heels before singing a snippet of the album's title track. Here for It All was released on September 26, 2025, and is her third album with L.A. Reid as executive producer. It includes guest appearances from Anderson .Paak, Kehlani, Shenseea, and the Clark Sisters. The album is Carey's first independent album, released under her own imprint, Mariah, and Gamma.

== Writing and recording ==
During the album's early development, Carey held recording sessions at The Butterfly Lounge, her home recording studio, with a small group of collaborators. In a September 2025 interview with the Recording Academy, Carey recalled that the project began with what she described as "Mariah ballads", saying that she "didn't really know where they were going" but knew she was in "ballad zone". In a separate interview with Vogue that month, Carey said the album initially developed through her "vibing with different people and songs", before she had enough material for a full album. According to the Recording Academy, the first song to emerge from those early sessions was "Nothing Is Impossible".

Daniel Moore II and Carey began writing the album's title track, "Here for It All", at The Butterfly Lounge during the COVID-19 pandemic. Moore described the studio sessions as "jam sessions" where there were "no more rules, no more 'It has to be three minutes and 30 seconds to make the radio'". Carey later said she named the album after the track because it was her favorite song on the album and she "didn't want it to get lost". Carey's collaboration with the Clark Sisters, "Jesus I Do", was recorded in the summer of 2021. Dorinda Clark-Cole told The Detroit News that the recording session "lasted all day", with each singer recording their vocals individually while Moore directed the session. Carey later told the Recording Academy that she had wanted to work with the Clark Sisters "forever" and described their presence in the studio as "a miracle".

Recording of the album continued into 2023 and 2024. In a November 2023 interview on Good Morning America, Carey said she had been in the studio with a choir the previous day, and in May 2024, she told Variety that she had recorded new songs and was deciding which ones to use. In a June 2025 interview with Zane Lowe and Ebro Darden for Apple Music, Carey said the album was complete and would have "11 or 12 songs". Carey also told Vogue that her work with Anderson .Paak was a turning point for the project, saying that it was when she felt the album was becoming "something really interesting". Paak co-wrote "Play This Song", "Type Dangerous", "In Your Feelings", and "I Won't Allow It", co-producing the latter two songs.

== Composition ==
=== Genres ===
Here for It All finds Carey embracing a wide range of sounds, moving beyond the R&B focus of Caution while also drawing on influences from the past. Rolling Stone writer Tim Chan described the album as having a "retro vibe", featuring soulful ballads and uptempo tracks that have elements of disco and funk. Slant Magazine also noted influences of soul, disco and gospel, while The Independent described the album's pop-driven tracks as being "glitzy, nicely overwrought" and highlighted its R&B influences.

=== Content and songs ===
Commenting on the opening track, "Mi", Entertainment Focus described it as a low-key, "silky vocal-layered" introduction in which Carey leans into her diva image, while the Associated Press highlighted the song's self-assured lyrics. The Anderson .Paak duet "Play This Song" was described by Slant Magazine as a throwback to 1970s soul, with Carey herself telling Vogue that her work with Paak pursued a retro '70s feel. The album's lead single "Type Dangerous" samples Eric B. & Rakim's "Eric B. Is President", with Chloe Hall of Elle describing the song as showing a "sassier side" of Carey. "Sugar Sweet", a collaboration with Kehlani and Shenseea, features elements of dancehall music, and was described by Hall as a "dreamy pop hit".

"In Your Feelings" continues the album's soul influences, with GQ linking the song to the soul music that informed Carey's musical upbringing. Slant described "Nothing Is Impossible" as a "soul-searching piano ballad", and both Vogue and Apple Music framed it as a song about resilience and overcoming hardship. The Fader described "Confetti & Champagne" as one of the album's "diva moments", while Entertainment Focus called the follow up track "I Won't Allow It" a funky disco song aimed at a former lover who tried to use Carey's name for personal gain. Carey told Vogue that "I Won't Allow It" reflected the album’s themes of empowerment, quoting the lyric "I won't entertain all your narcissistic ways" and saying that, although it was written "for a laugh", she "really meant it".

The album's closing run shifts toward softer rock and gospel. "My Love" is a cover of Wings' 1973 single, which GQ described as part of the album's engagement with 1970s soft rock, while Apple Music presented the recording as an homage to one of Carey's childhood favorites. "Jesus I Do" features the Clark Sisters and was described by Entertainment Focus as an uptempo, celebratory gospel number rather than a grand gospel ballad akin to some of Carey's earlier work. The title track, "Here for It All", runs for six minutes and 37 seconds and closes the album as a ballad that expands into a gospel-influenced finale. Slant highlighted its gospel-infused climax, and Carey told both Associated Press and GQ that she chose it as the final song because of its extended, spiritually tinged ending.

== Promotion ==
=== Marketing and live performances ===
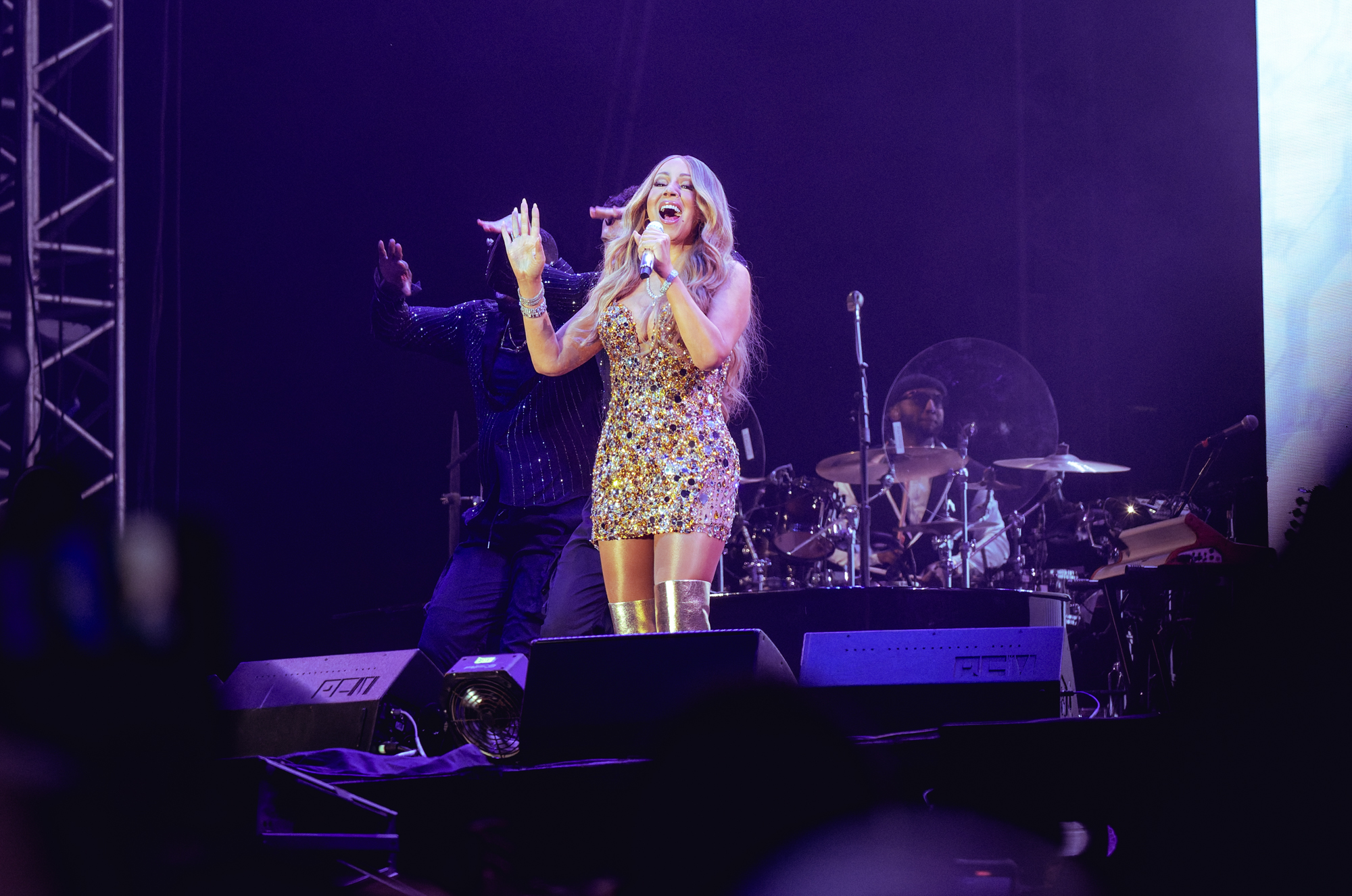
Carey performing at the Sandringham Estate on August 15, 2025

As part of the album's promotion, Amazon launched an official artist merchandise shop featuring a collection of Carey-branded items. The line included T-shirts printed with the Here for It All cover artwork, a butterfly-themed hoodie, a baseball cap displaying the album title on the front and Carey's butterfly icon on the back, as well as accessories and limited-edition vinyl. During her Apple Music conversation with SZA, Carey previewed a snippet of the song "In Your Feelings".

On June 9, 2025, Carey attended the 2025 BET Awards, where she was honored with the Ultimate Icon Award. During the ceremony, she performed "Type Dangerous" for the first time, joined by Anderson .Paak, who played the drums during the performance. An appearance at the Capital Summertime Ball followed on June 15, where she performed a setlist of songs that included "Type Dangerous". On August 2, Carey headlined Brighton Pride, where she performed "Sugar Sweet" for the first time. This was followed by a performance at the Sandringham Estate on August 15, as part of the Heritage Live Festivals concert series, where Carey performed a setlist that included "Type Dangerous". On September 7, Carey attended the 2025 MTV Video Music Awards, where she was honored with the Michael Jackson Video Vanguard Award, and performed a medley of her hits, opening with "Sugar Sweet". On September 29, Carey appeared on The Tonight Show Starring Jimmy Fallon, where she sang a live version of "Play This Song" with Paak, which was also the first performance of the song.

Carey performed two concerts in Brazil in September 2025 featuring "Type Dangerous" and "Sugar Sweet" in the setlist, headlining The Town festival in São Paulo on September 13, and the Amazônia Live concert in Belém on September 17. According to Gil Kaufman of Billboard, the latter concert took place on the Guama River, and featured Carey "performing on a floating stage as part of the show intended to raise awareness about the importance of preserving the rainforest". Following the release of Here for It All, Carey incorporated "Play This Song", "Type Dangerous", "Sugar Sweet", and "In Your Feelings" into the setlist of her tour, The Celebration of Mimi (2025). On December 31, Carey performed on Dick Clark's New Year's Rockin' Eve, where she sang "In Your Feelings" as part of her setlist. On February 6, 2026, Carey performed "Nothing Is Impossible" as a part of a medley with a cover of Italian singer Domenico Modugno's song "Volare" at the opening ceremony of the 2026 Winter Olympics.

=== Singles and videos ===
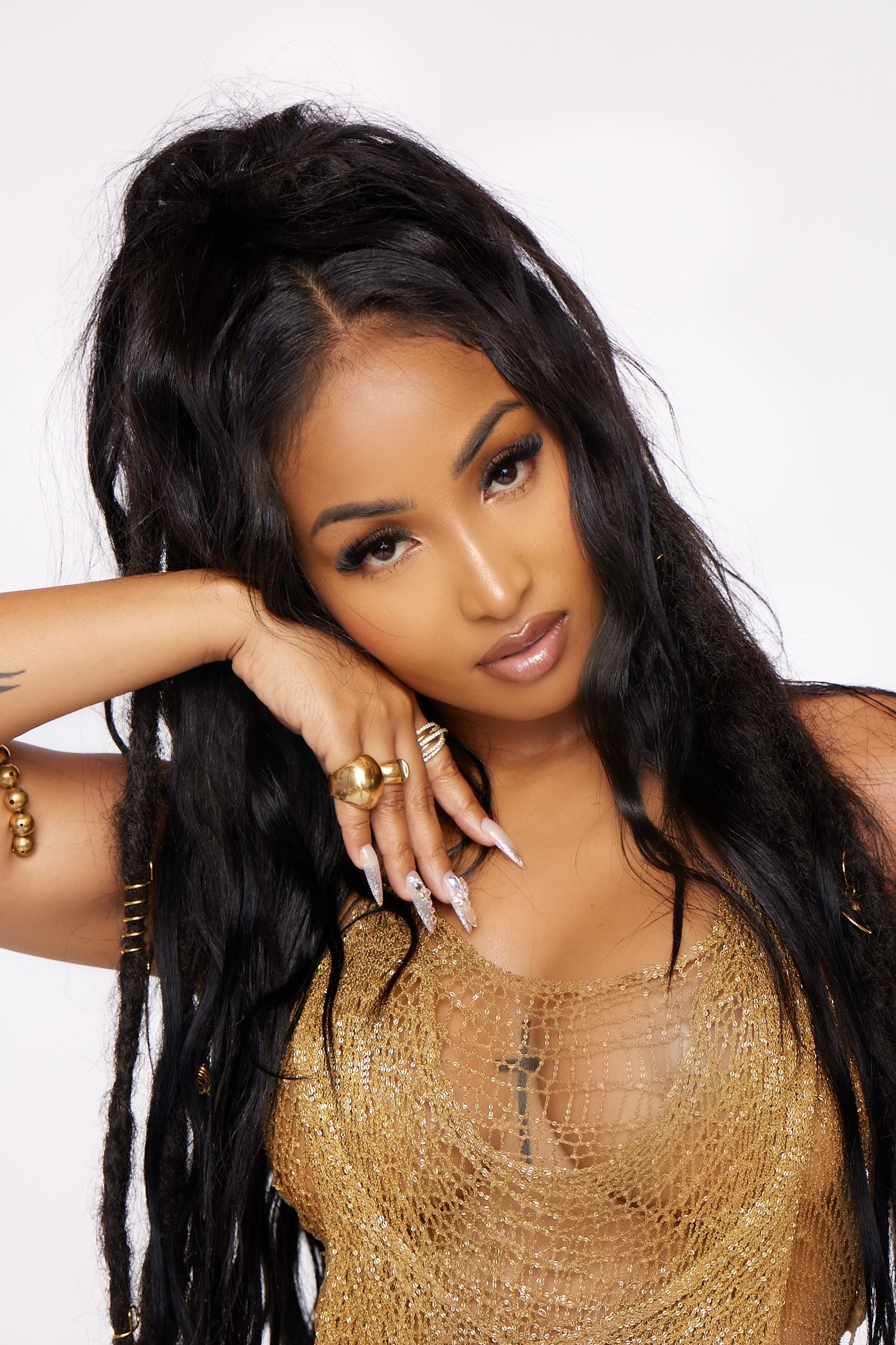
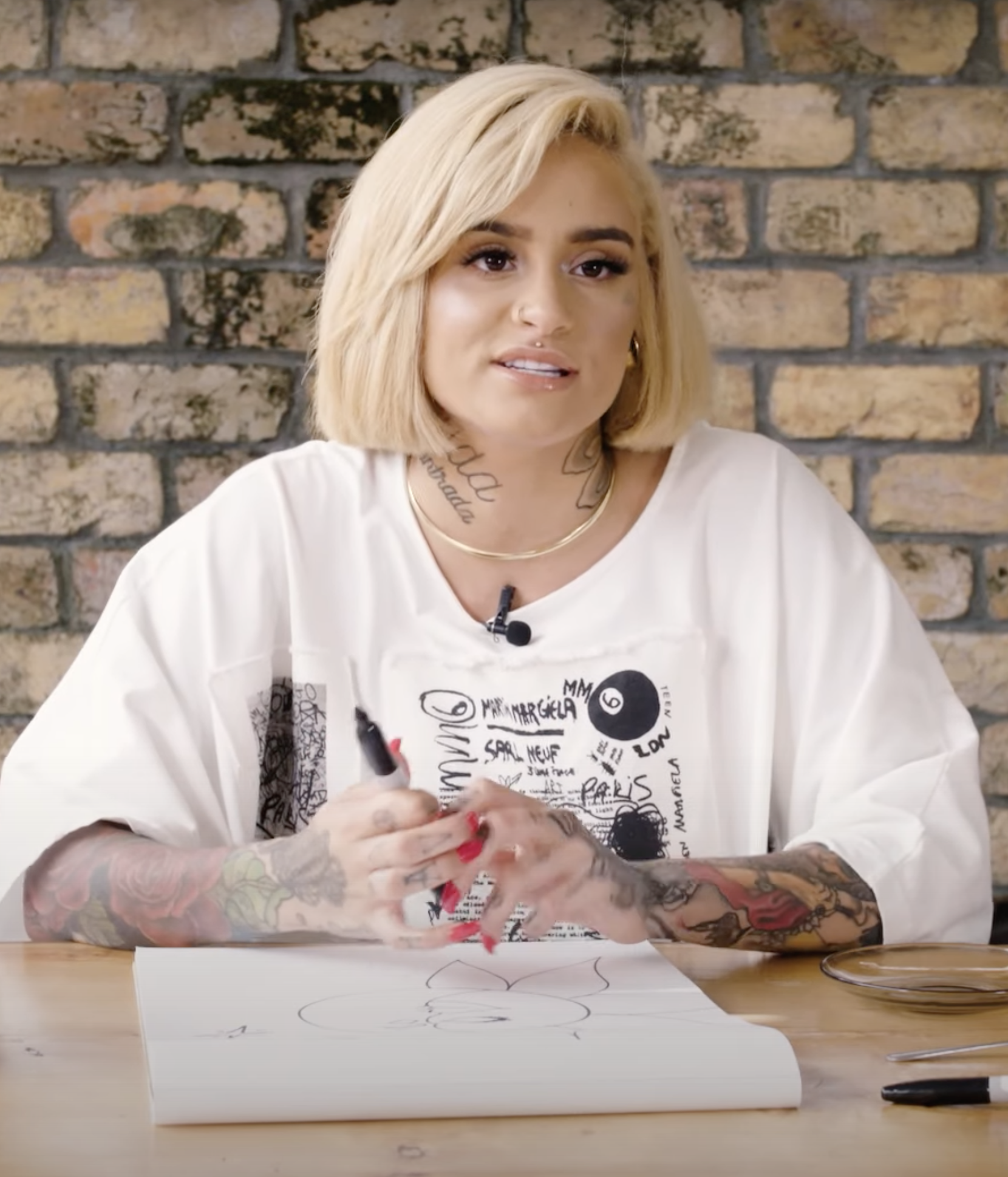
Shenseea (left) and Kehlani (right) feature on "Sugar Sweet".

In early June 2025, Carey began to tease the lead single for Here for It All. The single, "Type Dangerous", was released on June 6, with its Joseph Kahn-directed music video premiering a week later. The song debuted at number 95 on the US Billboard Hot 100, marking Carey's fiftieth entry on the chart, while reaching number 24 on the Billboard Hot R&B/Hip-Hop Songs chart. Four remixes of the song were released, including features from Busta Rhymes, Redman, Method Man, Big Sean, DJ Snake, and Luísa Sonza. "Type Dangerous" won the MTV Video Music Award for Best R&B at the 2025 edition of the ceremony, marking one of the two VMA wins Carey received at the ceremony, which were also the first of her career.

On July 19, Carey teased the album's second single titled "Sugar Sweet" on her social media, which also appears as the fourth track on the album. "Sugar Sweet" was released on July 25, featuring Kehlani and Shenseea. The track peaked at number 17 on the Billboard Hot R&B Songs chart. On September 23, Carey announced that the music video for the track "Play This Song", featuring Anderson .Paak, would be released on the same day as Here for It All. Writing for Billboard, Hannah Dailey noted that the video is a "black-and-white visual [which] shows Carey and the Silk Sonic musician looking glamorous in chic blazers while singing to one another inside a luxurious mansion". The track was later revealed to be the third single from Here for It All, and debuted at number 11 on the Billboard Hot R&B Songs chart.

Promotion continued into 2026 with three further singles serviced to US radio. On December 19, 2025, Billboard announced that "Nothing Is Impossible" would be serviced to US adult pop and adult contemporary stations on January 12, 2026, as the album's fourth single. It reached number 25 on the Adult Pop Airplay chart in March 2026. On January 27, Carey announced "In Your Feelings" as a new single while a guest on the Atlanta radio station V-103. The track had previously become her fourth number one on the US Adult R&B Airplay chart in December 2025. The same day, "Jesus I Do" received its radio premiere on WPOL's Get Up! Mornings with Erica Campbell, later reaching number five on Hot Gospel Songs chart and number one on the Gospel Airplay chart; it was also nominated for Contemporary Gospel Recorded Song of the Year at the 56th GMA Dove Awards. On March 27, Carey released a two-track EP containing a medley of "Volare" and "Nothing Is Impossible" from her Winter Olympics performance, alongside an orchestral version of the latter with the RoyzNoyz orchestra.

== Critical reception ==
Professional ratings
Aggregate scores
Source	Rating
AnyDecentMusic?	6.9/10
Metacritic	73/100
Review scores
Source	Rating
AllMusic	3.5/5 stars
NME	4/5 stars
Paste	7.0/10
Pitchfork	7.0/10
PopMatters	8/10
Rolling Stone	3/5 stars
Slant Magazine	3/5 stars
The Arts Desk	3/5 stars
The Independent	4/5 stars
The Times	2/5 stars

Here for It All received generally positive reviews from music critics upon release. According to the review aggregator Metacritic, Here for It All received "generally favorable reviews" based on a weighted average score of 73 out of 100 from 8 critic scores. The review aggregator site AnyDecentMusic? compiled seven reviews and gave the album an average of 6.9 out of 10, based on their assessment of the critical consensus.

Ziwei Puah of NME and Adam White of The Independent rated Here for It All four out of five stars. Puah complimented Carey on her confident delivery throughout the album, despite her voice "not being what it was". He singled out "My Love" and "Jesus I Do" for praise, complimenting her "gorgeous" tone on the former and describing the latter as "a modern-day version of 1991's 'Make It Happen'", in which Carey's "lightness and joy shine through". White praised Carey's vocals on the album, which he described as having a "lovely grit", as well as the album's "immaculately well-written" lyrics. He highlighted the title track as a standout, describing it as "full of heavenly vocal runs". Writing for PopMatters, Peter Piatkowski gave the album eight out of ten, describing it as "charmingly retro without feeling stale or derivative", and argued that Carey tried too hard to stay contemporary with the album's lead single "Type Dangerous", writing that "as evidenced by the other, better songs on the project, she doesn’t need to try that hard to sound fresh". Rich Juzwiak of Pitchfork gave Here for It All a rating of seven out of ten, complimenting Carey's vulnerability on the project, particularly on the album's title track, while also highlighting the album's melodic composition. Juzwiak praised Carey's candidness regarding her vocals, describing them as a "realistic portraiture of where she is now as a singer" and stating that "[Carey's vocal] grit is alluring, bringing a tear-stained realness to her vulnerable lyrics". In a review for AllMusic, Andy Kellman gave the album three and a half out of five stars, describing the album as "uneven" compared to Caution, but praised Carey's exploration of different genres and the '70s soul influences brought to the project by Anderson .Paak.

Andy Steiner of Paste gave Here for It All seven out of ten, describing it as more "generalist" than Caution and said that it occasionally drifts into the "dreaded terrain of adult contemporary". However, he praised Carey's imperfect vocals, which he considered the album's "central musical element", as marking the beginning of a new era for the singer in which "the Mariah of the present can comfortably coexist alongside her legacy as pop's greatest vocalist". Rolling Stone writer Tim Chan, Slant Magazine contributor Alexa Camp, and The Arts Desk editor Joe Muggs gave Here for It All three out of five stars. Chan compared the album's soul influences to those of "Motown greats" and highlighted the tracks "My Love", "Nothing Is Impossible", and "I Won't Allow It" as standouts, praising their lyrical content and production. He wrote that the album overall is "relaxed, yet restrained". Camp felt that the title track and "Nothing Is Impossible" were the album's best songs, though she added that they were reminders of Carey's past material and said that the singer "seems stuck in her own past" lyrically. She also felt that the vocals overall "are at turns reedy and husky, and, perhaps as a result, over-processed". While Muggs wrote that Carey did not express "particularly new things" musically, he declared her voice to still be "incredible", praising the balance between Carey's vocals and the album's production. Rating the album two stars out of five, Will Hodgkinson of The Times complimented Carey's vocals on Here for It All, describing her range as "impressive as ever", particularly on the track "Nothing Is Impossible". However, he criticized the album's production, describing it as "an excess of synthetic beats, syrupy R&B and the odd Seventies disco moment".

=== Accolades ===
A summary of accolades by publication and rank
Publication	Accolade	Rank	Ref.
Los Angeles Times	The 25 Best Albums of 2025	25	
PopMatters	The 25 Best Pop Albums of 2025	21	
Rated R&B	The 25 Best R&B Albums of 2025	16	

== Commercial performance ==
In the United States, Here for It All debuted at number seven on the US Billboard 200, selling 47,000 album-equivalent units, which consisted of 39,000 pure sales, 7,000 streaming-equivalent units (translated from 9.53 million on-demand streams) and 1,000 track-equivalent units. The album became Carey's nineteenth top ten album on the Billboard 200, surpassing Taylor Swift as the artist with the third-most top 10s among women. It reached the top spot on the Top Independent Albums chart. In its second week, the album fell to number 187 on the Billboard 200.

In the United Kingdom, Here for It All debuted at number 31 on the UK Albums Chart, selling 3,376 album-equivalent units, and became Carey's twentieth top 40 album in the country. Additionally, it became her eleventh number-one album on the UK R&B Albums chart. In Scotland, the album debuted at number 18 on the Scottish Albums Chart, becoming Carey's highest charting album in the country since E=MC² (2008). In Australia, the album reached number 19 on the ARIA Top 50 Albums Chart, becoming her third consecutive top twenty studio album in the country, following Me. I Am Mariah... The Elusive Chanteuse (2014) and Caution (2018). Elsewhere, the album attained top twenty placements on the charts in Wallonia and Switzerland, and reached the top forty in Croatia, Flanders, Germany, Poland, and Spain.

== Track listing ==
Here for It All track listing
No.	Title	Writer(s)	Producer(s)	Length
1.	"Mi"	Mariah Carey; Jonathan Yip; Ray Romulus; Jeremy Reeves; Jeff Baranowski; Luke Milano; Felisha King-Harvey	Carey; the Stereotypes; 9AM	2:49
2.	"Play This Song" (featuring Anderson .Paak)	Carey; Brandon Paak Anderson; Kenya Rae Johnson; Jairus Mozee; Jason Pounds; Daniel Moore II	Carey; N.W.I.; Moore	3:44
3.	"Type Dangerous"	Carey; Anderson; Johnson; Mozee; Pounds; Moore; Eric Barrier; William Griffin	Carey; N.W.I.; Moore	2:55
4.	"Sugar Sweet"	Carey; Bernard Harvey; King-Harvey; Kehlani Parrish; Chinsea Linda Lee; Donny Flores; Mikhail Wesley Miller; Darius Scott Dixson; Patrick Charles	Carey; Harv	2:36
5.	"In Your Feelings"	Carey; Anderson; Johnson; Rogét Chahayed; Alissia Benveniste	Carey; Anderson .Paak; Rogét & Alissia^{[a]}	3:22
6.	"Nothing Is Impossible"	Carey; Moore	Carey; Moore	3:22
7.	"Confetti & Champagne"	Carey; Harvey; King-Harvey	Carey; Harv	2:35
8.	"I Won't Allow It"	Carey; Anderson; Johnson; Uforo Ebong; Chahayed; Benveniste	Carey; Anderson .Paak; Bongo ByTheWay^{[a]}; Rogét & Alissia^{[a]}	3:26
9.	"My Love" (Paul McCartney and Wings cover)	Paul McCartney; Linda McCartney	Carey; Moore	3:50
10.	"Jesus I Do" (featuring the Clark Sisters)	Carey; Moore; Karen Clark Sheard; Dorinda Clark-Cole; Jacky Clark Chisholm	Carey; Moore	3:25
11.	"Here for It All"	Carey; Moore	Carey; Moore	6:37
Total length:				39:45

Japanese release bonus tracks
No.	Title	Writer(s)	Producer(s)	Length
12.	"Type Dangerous" (DJ Snake remix)	Carey; Anderson; Johnson; Mozee; Pounds; Moore; Barrier; Griffin	Carey; N.W.I.; Moore	3:25
13.	"Sugar Sweet" (featuring Shenseea and Kehlani)	Carey; Harvey; King-Harvey; Parrish; Lee; Flores; Miller; Dixson; Charles	Carey; Harv	3:40
Total length:				45:50

=== Notes ===
- ^{^[a]} signifies a co-producer.
- "Type Dangerous" samples the 1986 song "Eric B. Is President" by Eric B. & Rakim, written by Eric Barrier and William Griffin.
- "Sugar Sweet" does not feature Shenseea and Kehlani on standard physical editions; this version is also featured as the digital deluxe edition bonus track.

== Credits and personnel ==
Credits were taken from the album's booklet.

=== Recording locations ===
- Los Angeles, California: Larrabee Sound Studios, Honeywest Studios, Conway Recording Studios, Westlake Recording Studios;
- Aspen, Colorado: Honey Snow Studios;
- New York City, New York: Electric Lady Studios, Second Take Sound (strings on track 6);
- Connecticut: Honeyeast Studios;
- Atlanta, Georgia: The Butterfly Lounge

=== Musicians ===
- Mariah Carey – lead vocals, background vocals, songwriter, producer
- Jeremy Reeves – bass guitar, programming (track 1)
- Ray Romulus – percussion, programming (1)
- Jeff Baranowski – bass guitar (1)
- Luke Milano – keyboards (1)
- 9am – programming (1)
- Jonathan Yip – synthesizer (1)
- Anderson .Paak – vocals (2), drums (5), background vocals (8)
- Daniel Moore II – background vocals (2), keyboards (5, 9–11)
- Rae Khalil – background vocals (2, 8)
- Jairus Mozee – bass guitar, guitar (2)
- N.W.I – programming (2)
- Maurice "Mobetta" Brown – trumpet (2)
- Harv – programming (4)
- Shenseea – vocals (4)
- Kehlani – vocals (4)
- Alissia Benveniste – bass guitar, percussion (5); background vocals (8)
- José Ríos – guitar (5, 8)
- Rogét Chahayed – keyboards (5, 8), programming (5)
- Roy Cotton – conductor, strings arrangement (6)
- Cremaine Booker – cello (6)
- Kayla Williams – viola (6)
- Sam Gray – viola (6)
- Frédérique Gnaman – violin (6)
- Grace Youn – violin (6)
- Justus Ross – violin (6)
- Rafaillia Kapsokavadi – violin (6)
- BongoByTheWay – background vocals, piano, programming, synthesizer (8)
- Julian Vasquez – programming (8)
- Joshua Foster – drums (9–11), percussion (11)
- Derrieux Edgecombe – bass guitar (9–11)
- Bridget Sarai – background vocals (9)
- Norelle – background vocals (9)
- Tim Stewart – guitar (9)
- Tremaine "Six7" Williams – drum programming (10)
- Kyle Bolden – guitar (10)
- The Clark Sisters – vocals (10)

=== Technical ===
- Kevin "KD" Davis – mixing (1)
- Colin Leonard – mastering
- Brian Garten – mixing (2–11), engineering (all tracks)
- Jhair Lazo – engineering (2, 3, 5)
- Julian Vasquez – engineering (5)
- Chris Allen – engineering (6)
- Jenna Felsenthal – Kehlani vocal mixing (4)
- Jose "Paniik" Morales – Shenseea vocal mixing (4)
- Mark Parfitt – engineering assistance (4)

== Charts ==
Chart performance
Chart (2025)	Peak position
Australian Albums (ARIA)	19
Austrian Albums (Ö3 Austria)	41
Belgian Albums (Ultratop Flanders)	27
Belgian Albums (Ultratop Wallonia)	19
Croatian International Albums (HDU)	25
Dutch Albums (Album Top 100)	53
French Albums (SNEP)	50
German Albums (Offizielle Top 100)	37
German Pop Albums (Offizielle Top 100)	11
Hungarian Physical Albums (MAHASZ)	15
Irish Independent Albums (IRMA)	11
Italian Albums (FIMI)	78
Japanese Combined Albums (Oricon)	48
Japanese Top Albums Sales (Billboard Japan)	26
Norwegian Physical Albums (IFPI Norge)	9
Polish Albums (ZPAV)	22
Portuguese Albums (AFP)	114
Scottish Albums (Official Charts)	18
Spanish Albums (PROMUSICAE)	24
Swiss Albums (Schweizer Hitparade)	18
UK Albums (Official Charts)	31
UK Independent Albums (Official Charts)	4
UK R&B Albums (Official Charts)	1
US Billboard 200	7
US Independent Albums (Billboard)	1
US Top R&B/Hip-Hop Albums (Billboard)	3

== Release history ==
Release history
Region	Initial release date	Edition	Formats	Label	Ref.
Various	September 26, 2025	Standard (Note: The Japanese CD and LP edition includes two bonus tracks: a DJ Snake remix of "Type Dangerous" and the version of "Sugar Sweet" featuring Shenseea and Kehlani.)	Cassette; CD; digital download; LP; streaming	Gamma; Mariah	
Japan	September 26, 2025	Standard	CD; LP	Ultra-Vybe	
