= Harv (disambiguation) =

Harv (born 1985) is an American record producer. Harv may also refer to:

- Harv., taxonomic author abbreviation of William Henry Harvey (1811–1866), Irish botanist
- Harvard University, private Ivy League research university founded in 1636 in Cambridge, Massachusetts
  - Harvard Law School, law school of Harvard University founded in 1817
  - Harvard Law Review, journal of the law school founded in 1887
