= Available (disambiguation) =

Available refers to availability.

Available may also refer to:

- Available (song), a song by Justin Bieber from the album Changes, 2020
- "Available", a song by Flo Rida from the album R.O.O.T.S., 2009
- "Available", a song by Frank Sinatra from the album Softly, as I Leave You, 1964
- "Available", a song by Moving Units, 2004
- Available name, a term in zoological taxonomy
