= Sugar Sweet =

2025 single by Mariah Carey

Single by Mariah Carey featuring Shenseea and Kehlani

from the album Here for It All
- Released: July 25, 2025
- Studio: Larrabee (Los Angeles, CA); Honeywest Studios (Los Angeles, CA)
- Genre: Dancehall; R&B; afrobeats
- Length: 3:40
- Label: Gamma
- Songwriters: Mariah Carey; Darius Scott Dixson; Donny Flores; Bernard Harvey; Felisha King Harvey; Kehlani Parrish; Chinsea Linda Lee; Patrick Charles; Mikhail Wesley Miller
- Producers: Mariah Carey; Harv

Mariah Carey singles chronology
"Type Dangerous" (2025)	"Sugar Sweet" (2025)	"Play This Song" (2025)

Shenseea singles chronology
"Aguita e Coco" (2025)	"Sugar Sweet" (2025)	"Self Love" (2025)

Kehlani singles chronology
"Folded" (2025)	"Sugar Sweet" (2025)	"Safe" (2025)

Music video
- "Sugar Sweet" on YouTube

"Sugar Sweet" is a song by American singer-songwriter Mariah Carey featuring Jamaican singer Shenseea and fellow American singer Kehlani. The song was written alongside Dixson, Donny Flores, Felisha King Harvey of Cherish, Patrick Charles & Mikhail Wesley Miller, and producer Harv. It was released on July 25, 2025, as the second single from Carey's sixteenth studio album, Here for It All, through her own imprint, Mariah, and a media company Gamma, impacting rhythmic contemporary radio the following month.

"Sugar Sweet" is song that crosses over between afrobeats, dancehall and R&B music, with skittering drums and sultry synthesizers. Lyrically, the song talks about pleasing a love interest. It received positive reviews from most music critics, who commended the laid back sound and the overall production of the song. Commercially, the track spent six weeks on the US Billboard Hot R&B Songs chart, peaking at number 17. "Sugar Sweet" was performed live during the 2025 MTV Video Music Awards, her The Celebration of Mimi tour and the Amazônia Live concert.

== Background and release ==
On July 19, 2025, Carey teased her new single "Sugar Sweet" through a video posted on her social media. In the clip, Carey is seen mixing batter at a kitchen counter while mouthing lyrics to the unreleased track. The video, styled as a lighthearted preview for fans, hinted at the song's sweet and playful concept. Earlier in the month, Carey revealed that she had completed her upcoming album Here for It All during a live interview with Zane Lowe and Ebro Darden at the new Apple Music Studios in Los Angeles. During the interview, Carey expressed excitement about "Sugar Sweet", describing it as "very summery" and noting, "I like the beat as well".

Prior to the single's release, Carey appeared in a TikTok video alongside Shenseea and Kehlani, where all three were seen singing along to "Sugar Sweet". The former commented on working with Carey as she declared she as a longtime Carey listener, describing the moment as "full-circle moment", meanwhile the latter expressed excitement over the collaboration as well. The song serves as the second single from her sixteenth studio album Here for It All, being serviced to rhythmic contemporary radio on August 19, 2025. A solo version was included in place of the song on physical editions, and a digital deluxe was also released through Carey's website.

== Composition ==
"Sugar Sweet" was written by Mariah Carey, Kehlani, Shenseea, Darius Scott Dixson, Donny Flores, Bernard Harvey, Felisha King Harvey, Patrick Charles and Mikhail Wesley Miller, with production being handled by Carey and Harvey. It is a dancehall-tinged track that features skittering drums, sultry synthesizers, and melodic verses performed by all three vocalists.

== Critical reception ==
"Sugar Sweet" received generally positive reviews from music critics. Writing for ThisisRnB, the editorial team described the track as "a dreamy, effortless collaboration that feels like summer in slow motion," praising its "airy production, warm tones, and just the right touch of sweetness." Billboard highlighted the collaboration's summery feel and vocal chemistry, while Rolling Stone praised the song's nostalgic R&B influence and the seamless blend of styles between Carey, Kehlani, and Shenseea. Writing for The Arts Desk, Joe Mugg was favorable to Carey's "smooth R&B, modern in production style and ultra slick in musicianship," calling it a "respectable hit" alongside "Type Dangerous". Similarly, Tim Chan of Rolling Stone called them "the most radio-friendly hits on the album."

Reid Sperisen from newspaper Daily Bruin applauded the pairing of the three singers, saying it was "a high point", "as the three artists' crisp vocals skate over a beat so smooth that it enhances the trac's repetitive chorus," he continued. Describing it as a "laid back, coy confection", Mark Chappelle wrote for Albumism that "disliking this second single's balmy dancehall afrobeats may indicate a critical flaw in you." Rich Juzwiak, in his Pitchfork analysis, positively described it as a "lovely Caribbean-kissed single." Meanwhile, Andy Steiner of Paste declared the song "has a freshness and ease distinct from the rest of the record, in its buoyant, dancehall application." Ranking it as the third best song on the album, Billboard critic Heran Mamo picked the "sticky hook", the sensuality of Kehlani and Shenseea, and "a dash of dancehall flair" as the elements that make the song "a real treat". In a less favorable review, NME's Puah Ziwei considered to be a "bland dancehall", criticizing it for lacking her usual vocal nuances and clever lyricism.

== Live performances ==
On September 7, 2025, Carey performed "Sugar Sweet" as part of a medley during her 2025 MTV Video Music Awards, as she also accepted the Michael Jackson Video Vanguard Award. It was also part of the setlist of her fifteenth concert tour The Celebration of Mimi commencing in 2025. On September 17, 2025, the song was also the first on her Amazônia Live set in Amazônia, Brazil.

== Charts ==
Chart performance
Chart (2025–2026)	Peak position
Australia Digital Tracks (ARIA)	49
Japan Hot Overseas (Billboard Japan)	17
New Zealand Hot Singles (RMNZ)	16
Nigeria Bubbling Under Top 100 (TurnTable)	5
Nigeria Top International Songs (TurnTable)	25
South Korea BGM (Circle)	106
Suriname (Nationale Top 40)	4
UK Singles Sales (OCC)	41
US R&B/Hip-Hop Airplay (Billboard)	23
US R&B/Hip-Hop Digital Song Sales (Billboard)	2
US Rhythmic Airplay (Billboard)	31

== Release history ==
Release history
Region	Date	Format	Label	Ref.
Various	July 25, 2025	Digital download; streaming	Gamma	
United States	August 19, 2025	Rhythmic contemporary radio	Gamma	
