= Harv =

American record producer

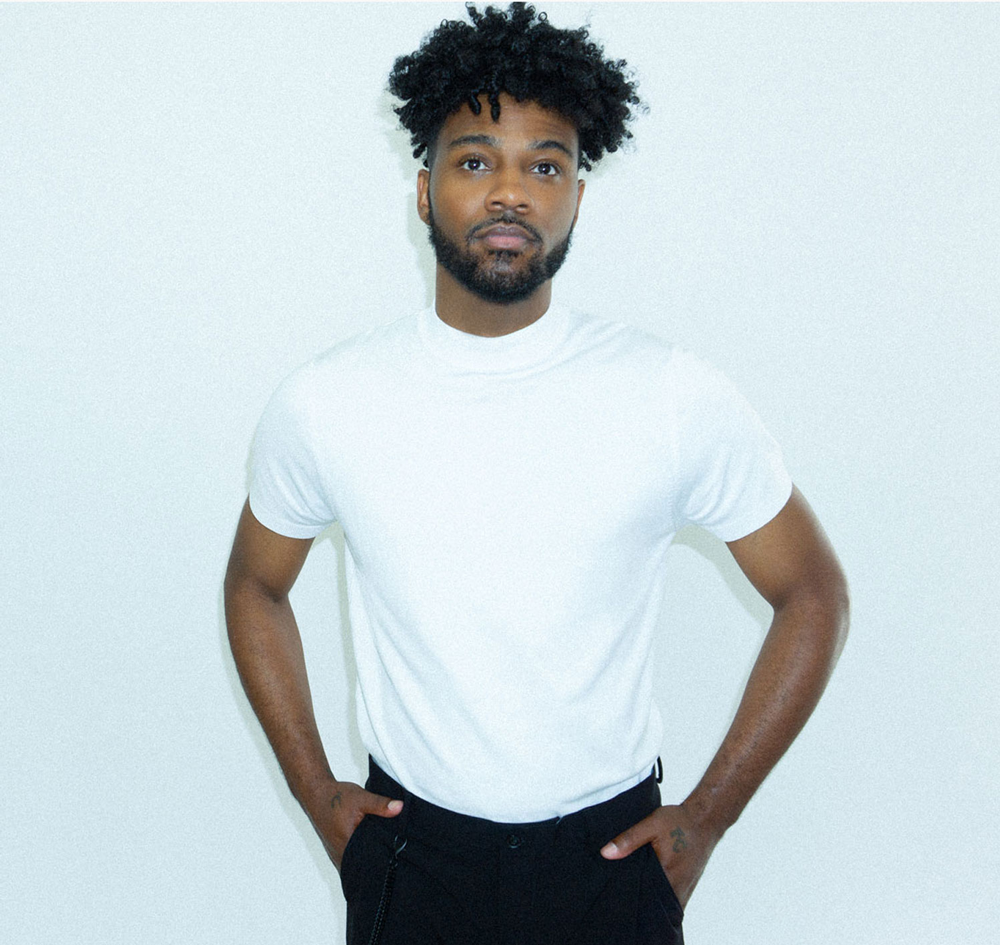
- Harvey in 2019

Background information
- Born: Bernard Harvey; August 17, 1985 (age 41); Kansas City, Kansas, U.S.
- Genres: Pop; R&B; hip hop; trap
- Occupations: Record producer; musician; songwriter
- Years active: 2005–present
- Labels: Avex USA; S10; Sony Music Publishing
- Spouse: Felisha King (m. 2021)
- Website: harvmusic.com

Bernard Harvey (born August 17, 1985), known professionally as Harv, is an American record producer, singer and songwriter from Kansas City, Kansas and based in Los Angeles. He has produced for music industry artists such as Justin Bieber, Skrillex, Cherish, Summer Walker, Normani, Post Malone, Gucci Mane, Eminem, and Omah Lay.

== Early years ==
Bernard Harvey was born and raised in Kansas City, Kansas. Harv was introduced to the musical arts at the age of nine, and began playing the bass by age twelve. He attended J.C. Harmon High School (graduating in 2003) where his love for music elevated joining the marching band, jazz band and playing different types of music all around the city. He has instruction in the piano, guitar, drums, trombone, and tuba, but is best known for his mastery of the bass.

In 2003, Harv's talent on the bass was recognized with a scholarship at Alabama State University where he obtained a degree in Music Technology and where he also pledged Kappa Alpha Psi fraternity. He began playing in church and local bands, which led him to expanding his interest in production and music composition. After graduating from college, Harv moved to Atlanta, where he worked in recording studios and played at nightclubs.

== Career ==
As Harv began making connections in Atlanta in 2007, he quickly established a friendship with Grammy-nominated producer Shondrae "Bangladesh" Crawford, subsequently playing bass guitar on a few major placements produced by Crawford such as "Lemonade" by Gucci Mane and "A Kiss" by Bad Meets Evil.

In 2009, Harv began playing the bass for Scooter Braun's artist, Justin Bieber, during his radio show tour and in 2010 he became his bassist for the My World Tour. After catching wind that Harv also produced music, Braun expressed his interest in signing Harv as a producer to his publishing company. Harv signed his first publishing deal with Braun's Sheba Publishing and Universal Music Publishing Group (UMPG) in 2011. In 2020, he signed a new publishing deal with Brandon Silverstein's S10 Publishing.

Harv continued to perform and tour with Bieber, and ahead of the 2016 Purpose World Tour, Harv was promoted to music director where he took on a bigger role on Bieber's team collaborating with him behind-the-scenes and on stage. From penning R&B and pop hits to working on live shows, his hands-on role had been largely dependent on in-person interactions.

His first time working with Bieber was on his first Christmas album, Under the Mistletoe in 2011, including “Fa La La,” (a Bieber collaboration with Boyz II Men), in which HARV co-wrote and co-produced. Other more recent notable co-productions for Bieber include “Somebody,” “Forever” (featuring Post Malone & Clever), and “Rockin’ Around the Christmas Tree.”

Harv produced three songs on Justin Bieber's February 2020 album, Changes: "Available", "At Least For Now" and "Forever", featuring Post Malone and Clever, which debuted at number 1 on the Billboard 200 chart. In February 2020, HARV earned his debut position on Billboard's Top R&B Producers Chart for his work on Bieber's single "Forever," which reached number 24 on the Billboard Hot 100.

In 2021, HARV produced the song "Peaches", featuring Daniel Caesar and Giveon on Justin Bieber's 2021 album, 'Justice'. The song debuted at number one on the Billboard Hot 100 and the album also debuted at number one on the Billboard 200. The single 'Peaches' also earned HARV five nominations for the 64th Annual Grammy Awards, including breaking the Grammy record for most credited writers on a track nominated for Song of the Year. Harv was also featured in the 2021 Amazon documentary Justin Bieber: Our World and Bieber's March 2021 NPR Tiny Desk Concert series performance. Later in 2021, Harv also produced Bieber, Skrillex, and Don Toliver's single, "Don't Go", as well as, Bieber and Juice Wrld's single, "Wandered to LA". Harv was honored as Variety's Hitmaker of the Month in October 2021 and their 2021 Hitmakers Impact List for his work on Bieber's song "Peaches".

In 2025, Harv appeared on the Netflix music docu-reality series Hitmakers.

== Personal life ==
Harv met Felisha King Harvey, known as one of the members of the R&B group Cherish, in 2014 during a studio session. They married on April 18, 2021, in Los Angeles, CA and were featured on an episode of Million Dollar Listing Los Angeles season thirteen in October 2021. The couple are both credited collaborators on Justin Bieber's song "Peaches", as well as Normani's single, "Fair".

== Production discography ==
List of singles as lead artist, with selected chart positions, sales, certifications, showing year released and album name
Title	Year	Peak chart positions										Certifications	Album
Title	Year	US	AUS	CAN	DEN	FRA	GER	IRL	NZ	SWE	UK	Certifications	Album
"Forever" (Justin Bieber featuring Post Malone and Clever)	2020	24	29	20	17	111	56	23	32	10	29	RIAA: Gold	Changes
"Peaches" (Justin Bieber featuring Daniel Caesar and Giveon)	2021	1	1	1	1	7	2	1	1	3	2	ARIA: 3× Platinum; BPI: Platinum; BVMI: Gold; GLF: Platinum; IFPI DEN: Platinum; RIAA: 3× Platinum; RMNZ: 2× Platinum; SNEP: Platinum	Justice
"Don't Go" (Skrillex, Justin Bieber, and Don Toliver)	2021	69	43	32	—	—	—	55	— (Note: "Don't Go" did not enter the NZ Top 40 Singles Chart, but peaked at number seven on the NZ Hot Singles Chart.)	67	56		Non-album single
"Wandered to LA" (Juice Wrld and Justin Bieber)	2021	49	44	29	—	—	89	45	— (Note: "Wandered to LA" did not enter the NZ Top 40 Singles Chart, but peaked at number four on the NZ Hot Singles Chart.)	— (Note: "Wandered to LA" did not enter the Swedish Singellista Chart, but peaked at number three on the Swedish Heatseeker Chart.)	59		Fighting Demons
"Attention" (Omah Lay and Justin Bieber)	2022	— (Note: "Attention" did not enter the Billboard Hot 100, but peaked at number 11 on the Bubbling Under Hot 100 Chart.)	—	45	—	—	—	78	— (Note: "Attention" did not enter the NZ Top 40 Singles Chart, but peaked at number nine on the NZ Hot Singles Chart.)	87	—		Boy Alone
"Fair" (Normani)	2022	—	—	—	—	—	—	—	—	—	—		TBA
"Not Alone" (Joe Jonas and Khalid)	2022	—	—	—	—	—	—	—	—	—	—		TBA
"Sugar Sweet" (Mariah Carey, Kehlani, and Shenseea)	2025	—	—	—	—	—	—	—	—	—	—		Here for it All

=== Album placements ===
Artist	Album/Song	Credit
2011
Justin Bieber	Under the Mistletoe	Composer, producer
Justin Bieber featuring Jaden Smith	Happy New Years	Producer
2012
Justin Bieber	Believe: "Just Like Them" (Deluxe), "Fairytale" (Spotify)	Composer, producer
Kandi Burruss	'"Be Alright" (used in Kandi Factory pilot)	Producer
Legaci	Driven: "All Because of You"	Composer, producer
2016
Sevyn Streeter	"Before I Do" (Girl Disrupted)	Composer, producer
2017
Sevyn Streeter	"Peace Sign" (featuring Dave East) (Girl Disrupted)	Composer, producer
Brenda Mada	'"House Party"	Producer
Juke Ross	"Colour Me"	Composer, producer
Omarion	"Open Up"	Composer, producer
2019
Poo Bear	"Yes Please"	Composer, producer
Summer Walker	"Anna Mae" (Open Up)	Composer, producer
2020
Justin Bieber	"Available" (Changes)	Composer, producer
Justin Bieber	"Forever" (featuring Post Malone & Clever) (Changes)	Composer, producer
Justin Bieber	"At Least for Now" (Changes)	Composer, producer
2021
Justin Bieber	"Peaches" (featuring Daniel Caesar & Giveon) (Justice)	Composer, producer
Justin Bieber	"Somebody" (Justice)	Composer, producer
Ai	"Expectations" (It's All Me, Vol. 2)	Producer
2022
Ai	"First Time" (Dream)	Producer
Normani	"Fair"	Producer
2025
Justin Bieber	"Too Long" (Swag)	Composer, producer
Mariah Carey	"Confetti & Champagne" (Here for It All)	Composer, producer

=== Bass guitarist ===
Artist	Song	Album
2005
Lil' Kim	"Get Yours"	The Naked Truth
2009
Gucci Mane	"Lemonade"	The State vs. Radric Davis
2010
Eminem	"A Kiss"	Bad Meets Evil
2011
Justin Bieber	"Overboard" (featuring Miley Cyrus)	Justin Bieber: Never Say Never Soundtrack

== Concert tours ==
Artist	Year	Role
Avant	2009	Bass Guitar
Priscilla Renea	2009	Bass Guitar
Heads of State	2011	Bass Guitar
Justin Bieber	2010–2015	Bass Guitar
Justin Bieber	2016–present	Music Director & Bass Guitar

== Film and TV placements ==
=== Movie features ===
- Justin Bieber: Never Say Never (2011)

=== Television appearances ===
- The Tonight Show with Jay Leno (2011, 2012)
- The Ellen DeGeneres Show (2011, 2012)
- The Oprah Winfrey Show (2011)
- The View (2011, 2012)
- The Today Show (2011, 2012)
- Justin Bieber: Never Say Never (2011)
- All Around the World NBC special (2012)
- Dick Clark's New Year's Eve show (2011)
- MTV Video Music Awards (2011)
- Teen Choice Awards (2011)
- Disney Christmas Parade (2011)
- The David Letterman Show (2011, 2012)
- Saturday Night Live (2020)
