= Nothing Is Impossible (Mariah Carey song) =

2026 single by Mariah Carey

- "Volare" / "Nothing Is Impossible" EP cover

Single by Mariah Carey

from the album Here for It All
- Released: January 12, 2026
- Studio: Conway Recording Studios (Los Angeles, CA)
- Length: 3:22
- Label: Gamma
- Songwriters: Mariah Carey; Daniel Moore II
- Producers: Mariah Carey; Daniel Moore II

Mariah Carey singles chronology
"Play This Song" (2025)	"Nothing Is Impossible" (2026)	"In Your Feelings" (2026)

Live video
- "Volare" / "Nothing Is Impossible" on YouTube

"Nothing Is Impossible" is a song by American singer-songwriter Mariah Carey. It was released on January 12, 2026, as the fourth single from Carey's sixteenth studio album, Here for It All (2025), through her own imprint, Mariah, and the media company Gamma. The song is a ballad, written and co-produced by Carey in collaboration with Daniel Moore II. Commercially, the song reached the top forty on the US Adult Pop Airplay chart.

On March 27, 2026, Carey released an EP on streaming services featuring a version of the song taken from her performance at the 2026 Winter Olympics, where she performed the track as a medley with "Volare". The EP also includes a newly recorded version of the song in an orchestral arrangement.

== Background and release ==
On August 27, 2025, Carey revealed that "Nothing Is Impossible" would be the sixth song on the tracklist of her then-upcoming album Here for It All. In an interview with Gayle King on CBS Mornings on September 24, 2025, the song was described by King as "showcasing Carey's resilience", with Carey herself stating "I mean, nothing is impossible. That one hits me at the heart".

On January 12, 2026, the original version of the song was serviced to US Adult Pop and Adult Contemporary radio stations. On March 27, 2026, Carey's birthday, she released a two-track EP which includes a version of the song taken from her performance at the 2026 Winter Olympics, and a new orchestral arrangement with the RoyNoyz orchestra. That same day, she shared a post on her Instagram regarding the song, stating:

"Nothing Is Impossible is a song that holds a very special place in my heart, and knowing how much is means to you makes it even more so. Performing it at the Olympics opening ceremony was a moment I will forever treasure. Today I'm sharing a new orchestral version, co-produced by Daniel Moore and beautifully performed by the RoyNoyz orchestra, which is available now as a bonus alongside the Volare / Nothing Is Impossible medley. I hope you love it as much as I do."

== Composition ==
"Nothing Is Impossible" is a downtempo ballad, written by Carey and Daniel Moore II, both of whom also produced the track. It features has a steady drum beat and swelling string arrangement. The track has been described as a "standout" from its parent album, and lyrically explores "achieving your dreams". Billboard have described the track as Carey's "ultimate love letter to herself" and where she is "at her most vulnerable on the album", with the lyric "I knew deep down inside that I could fly" capturing her resilience.

== Promotion ==
Carey performed "Nothing Is Impossible" for the first time as a part of a medley with a cover of Italian singer Domenico Modugno's song "Volare" at the opening ceremony of the 2026 Winter Olympics on February 6, 2026. The song was later used by NBC in the background of compilation material reflecting on the Winter Olympics following the games' conclusion.

== Commercial performance ==
In the United States, "Nothing Is Impossible" debuted at number 36 on the Adult Pop Airplay chart for the week dated January 31, 2026, becoming Carey's fourteenth top forty entry. It later peaked at number 25 for the chart week dated March 14, 2026.

== Track listing ==
- Volare / Nothing Is Impossible – EP
1. "Volare / Nothing Is Impossible - Live From The Milano Cortina 2026 Olympic Winter Games" – 3:39
2. "Nothing Is Impossible - Orchestral Version" – 3:54

== Charts ==
Chart performance for "Nothing Is Impossible"
Chart (2026)	Peak position
US Adult Pop Songs (Billboard)	25

== Release history ==
List of release dates and formats
Region	Date	Format	Version	Label	Ref.
United States	January 12, 2026	Adult pop radio; Adult contemporary radio	Original	Gamma	
Various	March 27, 2026	Digital download; streaming	"Volare" / "Nothing Is Impossible"	Gamma	
