= Forever (Justin Bieber song) =

2020 song by Justin Bieber featuring Post Malone and Clever

- YouTube audio thumbnail

Song by Justin Bieber featuring Post Malone and Clever

from the album Changes
- Released: October 2, 2020
- Recorded: June 2020
- Studio: April 2020
- Genre: Trap
- Length: 3:40
- Label: Def Jam
- Songwriters: Justin Bieber; Austin Post; Joshua Huie; Jason Boyd; Louis Bell; Bernard "Harv" Harvey; Ali Darwish; Billy Walsh
- Producers: Poo Bear; Harv

Audio video
- "Forever" on YouTube

"Forever" is a song by Canadian singer Justin Bieber featuring American rappers Post Malone and Clever. This track marks Bieber and Malone's second collaboration, following Bieber's feature on Malone's 2016 single "Deja Vu", from his debut studio album Stoney (2016). "Forever" is a trap song about an extreme urge to be with another individual until the end of their life.

"Forever" was well received by professional critics, who made favorable comments towards the vocal performances, the contributions of the guest stars, sound and composition. It peaked within the top 40 in more than 15 territories, among them the United States, where the song debuted at number 24 on the Billboard Hot 100 chart. It also reached the top 20 in Bieber's home country on the same magazine's Canadian Hot 100.

== Background and composition ==
On January 3, 2020, TMZ reported that Post Malone was among the featured artists to appear on Justin Bieber's upcoming album. Bieber had completed his parts for the collaboration and was waiting on vocals from Malone. Bieber last collaborated with Malone on the song "Deja Vu", featured on the latter's debut studio album Stoney (2016). Forever was one of the names being thrown around as a possible title for the new album, with Bieber also recently getting the word tattooed on his neck. On February 5, Bieber revealed the tracklist for Changes, which listed Malone and rising hip hop artist Clever as features on the seventh track titled "Forever". According to Dustin Fox of The Gadsden Times, Clever recorded his vocals in Gadsden at GAD3 Studios.

"Forever" is a trap song set in the key of C♯ minor with a tempo of 136 beats per minute. Lyndsey Havens of Billboard remarked that it is one of the few songs on Changes "that strays from more traditional-sounding R&B". NME's Hannah Mylrea described the track as a "jangly cut" with "upbeat production and warm, nostalgic beats". Jeremy Helligar of Variety noted the song's use of "plunky synths", which he characterized as "sound[ing] like drops of water". Alexis Petridis of The Guardian compared the vocal delivery on the song to that of mumble rap. It is a love song dealing with one's "overpowering urge to be with [another] until the end of [their] days".

== Critical reception ==
Lynn Sharpe from HotNewHipHop praised the vocals on "Forever", feeling that Bieber and Malone "compliment[ed] each other" in a seamless manner and that Clever beautifully reflected the track's "passionate nature". Billboard critic Taylor Weatherby ranked it as the third-best song on Changes and regarded it as "one of the most distinctive tracks" on the album, highlighting "[t]he plinking production, the staccato chorus, Post Malone's very Posty verse and Clever's punchy lines". Koltan Greenwood of Alternative Press called the song "a catchy and emotional bop". The A.V. Club's Annie Zaleski felt it was one of Changes's "most enduring moments", adding that Malone and Clever bring "gruff vulnerability" to the song. Carolyn Droke from Uproxx wrote that the song "boasts a full, resounding beat and succinct lyrical delivery". Pitchfork's Jayson Greene considered Malone's guest appearance one of the "[s]cattered bright spots" on Changes.

However, Ben Devlin from musicOMH found Clever's voice on "Forever" to be "obnoxiously weak". Joshua Bote of Paste remarked that Malone "adds a frantic tension to the cut", but disapproved of Bieber as "sound[ing] drained". Hannah Mylrea of NME thought that the song "begins to drag" after the start before it "stutter[s] to a stop". The Music writer Cyclone said that the track "never really goes anywhere" aside from the vocal performances.

== Commercial performance ==
In the United States, "Forever" debuted at number 24 on the Billboard Hot 100 chart dated February 29, 2020. It became Clever's first Hot 100 hit. Furthermore, it was one of the eight tracks from Changes to debut on the Hot R&B Songs chart. It led the pack with an entrance at number six and secured Bieber's 10th top 10 entry on the chart. On the UK Singles Chart, the song debuted at number 29 as the third top 40 track from Changes, after "Yummy" and "Intentions".

== Music video ==
A dance visual for "Forever", directed by Nick DeMoura, was released on March 9, 2020, as part of a collection of 16 music videos titled Changes: The Movement. In an interview with MTV News, DeMoura said the video came about after being inspired by the film Entrapment (1999). Straying away from the previous visuals for "Habitual" and "All Around Me" which focus on intimate and intricate routines, the video centers around a group of masked performers wearing riot gear-styled attire that dance as lights flicker around them. Trey Alston from MTV News described it as a high-tech espionage thriller with a cinematic flair.

== Credits and personnel ==
Credits adapted from Tidal.

- Justin Bieber – vocals, songwriter
- Post Malone – featured vocals, songwriter
- Clever – featured vocals, songwriter
- Poo Bear – producer, songwriter
- Louis Bell – songwriter, vocal producer, recording engineer
- HARV – producer, songwriter, keyboards
- Ali Darwish – songwriter
- Billy Walsh – songwriter
- Chris "TEK" O'Ryan – recording engineer
- JJ Stevens – recording engineer
- Josh Gudwin – recording engineer, mixer, vocal producer
- Elijah Marrett-Hitch – assistant mixer
- Chenao Wang – assistant recording engineer
- Colin Leonard – mastering engineer

== Charts ==
=== Weekly charts ===
Chart (2020)	Peak position
Australia (ARIA)	29
Austria (Ö3 Austria Top 40)	28
Canada Hot 100 (Billboard)	20
Czech Republic Singles Digital (ČNS IFPI)	24
Denmark (Tracklisten)	17
Estonia (Eesti Tipp-40)	26
France (SNEP)	111
Germany (GfK)	56
Greece (IFPI)	28
Hungary (Single Top 40)	35
Hungary (Stream Top 40)	23
Ireland (IRMA)	23
Italy (FIMI)	67
Lithuania (AGATA)	30
Netherlands (Single Top 100)	31
New Zealand (Recorded Music NZ)	32
Norway (VG-lista)	21
Portugal (AFP)	48
Singapore (RIAS)	98
Slovakia Singles Digital (ČNS IFPI)	15
Spain (PROMUSICAE)	98
Sweden (Sverigetopplistan)	10
Switzerland (Schweizer Hitparade)	33
UK Singles (Official Charts)	29
US Billboard Hot 100	24
US Hot R&B/Hip-Hop Songs (Billboard)	13
US Rolling Stone Top 100	9

=== Year-end charts ===
Chart (2020)	Position
US Hot R&B Songs (Billboard)	48

== Certifications ==
Region	Certification	Certified units/sales
Australia (ARIA)	Gold	35,000^{‡}
Brazil (Pro-Música Brasil)	Platinum	40,000^{‡}
New Zealand (RMNZ)	Gold	15,000^{‡}
United States (RIAA)	Gold	500,000^{‡}
^{‡} Sales+streaming figures based on certification alone.
