= Looking In (Mariah Carey song) =

1995 song by Mariah Carey

Song by Mariah Carey

from the album Daydream
- Studio: The Hit Factory (New York, NY); Wallyworld (San Rafael, CA)
- Genre: Soul
- Length: 3:35
- Label: Columbia
- Composers: Mariah Carey; Walter Afanasieff
- Lyricist: Mariah Carey
- Producers: Mariah Carey; Walter Afanasieff

Audio
- "Looking In" on YouTube

"Looking In" is a song by the American singer Mariah Carey from her fifth studio album, Daydream (1995). Carey wrote the song's lyrics, and she composed and produced it with Walter Afanasieff. It became available as the album's twelfth track on September 26, 1995, when Daydream was released by Columbia Records. A soul song, "Looking In" portrays Carey as an isolated, misunderstood diva, struggling with youthful fears and insecurity and draws inspiration from her childhood and marriage to Tommy Mottola.

Music critics have kept comparing "Looking In" to songs Carey has gone on to release several years after it, maintaining it as the standard to which they compare her other personal, introspective, and autobiographical songs. She delivered its first live performance at the Major League Baseball All-Star charity concert in 2013 to positive reception. Carey also included it on her 2024-25 The Celebration of Mimi residency.

== Background ==
In 1993, Mariah Carey began conceptualizing Music Box (1993), which would become the highest-selling album of her career. The creative choices for her previous two albums had been heavily controlled by her label Columbia Records, as well as her husband and the company's CEO, Tommy Mottola. The preceding album, Emotions (1991), had drawn influence from 1950s, 1960s, and 1970s ballads, gospel, R&B, and soul music and failed to match the success of her debut album. Following the tepid commercial performance, Columbia aimed for Music Box to produce very commercial singles that could garner strong radio airplay. The album was created as primarily a pop record and was more mainstream than the material on Emotions. Music Box went on to sell over 28 million copies worldwide and earned its place among the best-selling albums of all time. Due to the album's success, Columbia allowed Carey more control over the music she recorded for the next album, Daydream (1995).

Carey wrote the track "Looking In" within 15 minutes while living in Upstate New York and achieving commercial success. In an interview with MTV in 1995, she stated that it happened very quickly because it "flowed out of her." She also described the song as "real" and "emotional." The song became available as the twelfth track on Daydream, which was released on September 26, 1995. Although its personal nature got Carey in trouble with some people around her, she described it as a therapeutic moment which "needed to be written" and was "the most honest I had ever been".

== Composition ==
"Looking In" is three minutes and 35 seconds long. Carey and Afanasieff produced the song. Afanasieff plays keyboards, bass, and drum programming, and Dann Huff plays guitar. Gary Cirimelli and Dan Shea programmed the song; Dana Jon Chappelle, Mike Scott, Andy Smith, Kurt Lundvall, Jay Healy, and Brian Vibberts handled engineering; and Mick Guzauski mixed it.

"Looking In" is an introspective ballad. Entertainment Weekly's Ken Tucker believed the song was a great example of expansive ballads with intricate orchestrations that populated Daydream and enveloped the gospel-inspired melodies. Stephen Holden of The New York Times called it a "slow piano-and-voice ballad" that perhaps "drag[ged] a bit". Commenting that the album's instrumentation was "very lushly arranged and heavily steeped in soul and jazz-based arrangements", Sputnikmusic's Brendan Schroer added that "Looking In" would satisfy those "looking for something subdued and soulful" on it and contained a subtle classical guitar arrangement which suited the rest of the instrumentation.

The lyrics of "Looking In" portray Carey as an isolated, misunderstood diva, struggling with youthful fears and insecurity. They were influenced by her troubled marriage to Tommy Mottola from 1993 to 1998, and she sings in the third person about a girl who dreams of everything she can never be while struggling with insecurity in them. Carey eventually comments on people's perception of her, "You look at me and see the girl / that lives inside the golden world / But don't believe that's all there is to see / You'll never see the real me."

== Critical reception ==
In his book titled Mariah Carey Revisited, author Chris Nickson described Looking In as "Sinewy than previous ballads." He also states that Mariah used the song to reflect on her life and career so far. He also stated the following: “It is a very personal song,” she agreed, “but it is more about a mood. We all go through different moods, you can’t always feel happy—it’s showing a different side. When you are in the public eye, people seem to think they know all about you—they form a perception which often bears little relation to the person.” Variety's Danielle Turchiano compared the lyrics of "Looking In" to Carey's songs "Close My Eyes" and "Outside" and her cover of "Against All Odds (Take a Look at Me Now)" (1999), in which he thought Carey employed a "poetic approach to the trials and tribulations in her childhood".

Over the years, critics have kept comparing "Looking In" to other Carey songs. Slant Magazine's Sal Cinquemani believed the song "Twister" from the 2001 Glitter soundtrack was autobiographical in the same vein as "Looking In" and "Petals" from her 1999 album Rainbow. In 2014, Billboard's Andrew Hampp stated that Me. I Am Mariah... The Elusive Chanteuse (2014) showcased Carey's "intro-spective, 'morose' side" in a way similar to "Close My Eyes" and "Petals". In 2015, Tshepo Mokoena even likened "All I Want for Christmas Is You" to "Looking In", "Petals", and "Outside", as songs that drew from the melancholy of her "difficult childhood". In 2018, Cinquemani compared the song "Portrait" to "Looking In" but thought the former lacked the latter's sophistication.

== Live performances ==
Carey performed "Looking In" live for the first time at the Major League Baseball All-Star charity concert in 2013. She was in a white gown, with a feather wrap covering her injuries, stopping to take breaths in the middle and getting emotional. The performance drew positive reception from those in the audience. Carey also reprises the song during her 2024-25 The Celebration of Mimi residency.

== Credits and personnel ==
Credits are adapted from the liner notes of Daydream.

- Walter Afanasieff – producer, composer, keyboards, bass, drum programming
- Mariah Carey – producer, vocals, background vocals, lyricist, composer
- Dann Huff – guitar
- Gary Cirimelli – programming
- Dan Shea – programming
- Dana Jon Chappelle – engineer
- Mike Scott – engineer
- Andy Smith – engineer
- Kurt Lundvall – engineer
- Jay Healy – engineer
- Brian Vibberts – engineer
- Mick Guzauski – mixing

== Works cited ==
- Nickson, Chris (1998), Mariah Carey revisited: her story, St. Martin's Press, ISBN 978-0-312-19512-0
