= Type Dangerous =

2025 single by Mariah Carey

Single by Mariah Carey

from the album Here for It All
- Released: June 6, 2025
- Studio: Conway Recording Studios (Los Angeles, California); Honeywest Studios (Los Angeles, California)
- Genre: Hip hop soul; R&B
- Length: 2:55
- Label: Gamma
- Songwriters: Mariah Carey; Brandon Paak Anderson; Daniel Moore II; Eric Barrier; Jairus Mozee; Jason Pounds; Rae Khalil; William Griffin
- Producers: Mariah Carey; Daniel Moore II; NWi

Mariah Carey singles chronology
"Yes, And?" (remix) (2024)	"Type Dangerous" (2025)	"Sugar Sweet" (2025)

Music video
- "Type Dangerous" on YouTube

"Type Dangerous" is a song by American singer-songwriter Mariah Carey. It was released on June 6, 2025, as the lead single from her sixteenth studio album, Here for It All (2025), through her own imprint, Mariah and a media company, Gamma. Carey co-wrote and co-produced the single alongside Anderson .Paak, Jairus Mozee, Jason Pounds (billed as NWi in its production notes), and Daniel Moore. The song utilizes a sample from Eric B. & Rakim's 1986 track "Eric B. Is President". It is a hip hop soul and R&B song with elements of soul and pop music with a new jack swing foundation, featuring percussion-heavy production.

Lyrically, "Type Dangerous" finds Carey rap-singing about the attraction towards men who represent trouble—hence its title—yet the kind of danger she is willing to embrace. It was praised by music critics, who considered it one of the album's strongest tracks due to its lyrical sassiness and its sample. It performed moderately on the charts, reaching milestone achievements on US radio, while also becoming her 50th song to debut on the Billboard Hot 100. At the 2025 MTV Video Music Awards, the Joseph Kahn-directed music video won Best R&B Video, marking Carey's first competitive win. The song was sung live at the 2025 BET Awards as part of a medley, as well as the Amazônia Live concert and her tour The Celebration of Mimi (2025), both as the opening song.

== Background and release ==
On June 3, 2025, Carey teased the single through a short video on her social media, in which showed her listening to a track while sitting in a car. This prompted speculation about her sixteenth studio album. The single was announced to be titled "Type Dangerous" and was set for release three days after on June 6.

In a press statement, Carey expressed excitement about the release, calling it the beginning of a new chapter and noting that she had spent significant time in the studio crafting new material. The single marked her first new solo release since "In the Mix" in 2019, and followed her 2018 album Caution, alongside a period focused on seasonal promotions and anniversary editions of her previous work, including an expanded reissue of The Emancipation of Mimi, released a few weeks prior in May 2025 to celebrate the album's 20th anniversary.

== Composition and lyrics ==
"Type Dangerous" is a hip hop soul song written and produced by Carey alongside Anderson Paak, Jairus Mozee, and Jason Pounds (credited as NWi in its production notes) and Daniel Moore. It samples Eric B. & Rakim's 1986 hip hop classic track, "Eric B. Is President", pairing its groove with percussion-driven production that blends elements of new jack swing, soul and pop music. Eric Barrier and William Griffin - the songwriters of the sampled track - received co-writing credits. Lyrically, the track struts with confidence as Carey rap-sings on it, expressing attraction toward someone who may be trouble but the kind she's willing to embrace. Its bassline was compared to those of Anderson Paak song "Come Down" (2019) but as "a neutered version" by Paste magazine writer Andy Steiner. Alexa Camp of Slant Magazine described the single as a "midtempo R&B track", highlighting its lyrical boldness where Carey "refers to [her ex Tommy Mottola] as 'an evil king.'" The lyrics continue to explore her interest on dangerous men, "even if they turn out to be massive losers: a computer nerd she catches stalking girls online; a construction worker dealing drugs on the side", noted The Times journalist Will Hodgkinson. In some parts of the lyrics, Carey is also self-referential, with the line "certified diamonds like the songs I wrote” alluding to her RIAA diamond-certified holiday hit single "All I Want for Christmas is You” and "Oh, yes, I want someone to rescue me" pointing to the chorus of her 1993 number-one single "Dreamlover", as noted by Billboard magazine.

== Critical reception ==
"Type Dangerous" received generally positive reviews from music critics, though opinions varied. Many critics picked it as a highlight from the album. (Note: Attributed to AllMusic, Rolling Stone, Renowned for Sound, Albumism and USA Today.) Andy Kellman of AllMusic described it as "nostalgic hip-hop soul", while NME's Puah Ziwei called it a "sassy lead single", noting that "its hip-hop soul make things a little more interesting", thanks to its sample. Similarly, Mark Chappelle wrote for Albumism that the sample makes the song look "hot", while also noting the influence of hip-hop in many of her lead singles. Writing for The Arts Desk, Joe Mugg was favorable to Carey's "smooth R&B, modern in production style and ultra slick in musicianship." Both writers from The Independent - Adam White and Roisin O'Connor - were enthusiastic over the song, naming it an "amusing kiss-off". Emily Zemler from Rolling Stone highlighted it as a confident return, praising its contemporary R&B production, while Tim Chan of the same publication named it one of the "most radio-friendly hits on the album." Ranking it as the fifth best song on the album, Billboard critic Heran Mamo highlighted that it "makes her sound right at home on the hip-hop beat, and her penchant for peppering in multisyllabic, 10-dollar words (“I don’t have time for the rigamarole“) might get the online generation to pick up a dictionary." Melissa Ruggieri of USA Today also acknowledged the usage of the word "rigamarole" on it, noting "Carey deserves a song of the year Grammy for managing to rhyme 'hoes' with 'rigamarole'." She also applauded the singer for exuding "R&B sass" in an "unapologetically" way.

On the contrary, some reviewers were less enthusiastic. Rich Juzwiak, in his Pitchfork analysis, opined the song "flatlines in the hook", saying it was a 'meh' moment on the album. Popmatters critic Peter Piatkowski founded to be "a bit forced", calling it "the most concerted effort to keep Carey relevant", also noting its "busy" production "makes it most likely to date quickly." Alexa Camp of Slant Magazine criticized Carey's vocals, which she considered "over-processed" and "nearly unrecognizable", also disapproving its lyrical content, where, in her words, "Carey seems stuck in her own past."

== Accolades ==
Awards and nominations for "Type Dangerous"
Organization	Year	Category	Result	Ref.
MTV Video Music Awards	2025	Best R&B Video	Won	

== Music video ==
The song's music video is directed by Joseph Kahn and was scheduled to premiere on June 13. Ahead of the release, Kahn announced an "earth-shattering surprise" in the video. The video was eventually delayed a day for editing purposes, and released on June 14.

The video features Carey "working her way through a series of bachelors, dismissing them one after the next" in seven various acts, and features a guest appearance by American influencer and YouTuber MrBeast. Carey dismisses various different "types" of men including Mr. Player, Mr. Danger, Mr. Traitor, Mr. Racer, Mr. Dealer, and then Mr. Beast, making them all disappear. Billboard writer Ashley Iasimone opined the video captured Carey's "glamorous vibe and her humor". The video contains computer-generated imagery (CGI) and action scenes, and also featured Faraday Future luxury electronic vehicles. Camp also discussed the Joseph Kahn–directed video, which shows Carey dismissing successive "dangerous" suitors, framing the song's themes through playful yet incisive visuals. At the 2025 MTV Video Music Awards, "Type Dangerous" won Best R&B, marking Carey's first win.

== Live performances ==
On June 9, 2025, Carey performed "Type Dangerous" for the first time at the 2025 BET Awards as part of a medley with "It's Like That", with Rakim (whose song "Eric B. Is President" was sampled on the track) joining Carey on stage, and Anderson .Paak accompanying on drums. "Type Dangerous" was also included in Carey's set at Capital's Summertime Ball at Wembley Stadium on June 15, 2025. It was also part of the setlist of her fifteenth concert tour The Celebration of Mimi commencing in 2025 as the opening song. On September 17, 2025, the song was also the first on her Amazônia Live set in Amazônia, Brazil.

== Commercial performance ==
In the United States, "Type Dangerous" debuted (and peaked) at number 95 on the Billboard Hot 100, becoming Carey's 50th song on the chart. This also became her first new entry since her remix of "Oh Santa!" with Jennifer Hudson and Ariana Grande in 2020, her first non-Christmas entry since "I Don't" with YG in 2017, and her first solo non-holiday entry in ten years since "Infinity" in 2015. The song also peaked at number 24 on the US Hot R&B/Hip-Hop Songs chart. It peaked at number one on the Adult R&B Songs chart, making it her first number one entry on the chart since "Fly Like a Bird" in 2006.

"Type Dangerous" became Carey's most successful single on American radio stations in more than a decade. It is her highest-charting song on hot adult contemporary formats since "We Belong Together" in 2005, her highest-charting song on the R&B/Hip-Hop Airplay chart since "Touch My Body" in 2008, and her highest-charting song on rhythmic contemporary and pop outlets since "#Beautiful" in 2013. Billboard reported on the commercial impact of the single, noting that it became Carey's 50th entry on the Billboard Hot 100, further cementing her legacy as one of the chart's most successful artists.

== Track listing ==
- The Remixes – EP
1. "Type Dangerous" (The Remix of the Gods; featuring Busta Rhymes and Method Man & Redman) – 3:46
2. "Type Dangerous" (The Sean Don Remix; featuring Big Sean) – 2:56
3. "Type Dangerous" (The Touch the Soul of the People Remix; featuring DJ Snake) – 3:25
4. "Type Dangerous" (The Brazil Funk Remix; featuring Luísa Sonza) – 2:26

== Charts ==
=== Weekly charts ===
Chart (2025)	Peak position
Australia Digital Tracks (ARIA)	4
Costa Rica Anglo Airplay (Monitor Latino)	15
Germany Urban (Deutsche Black Charts)	1
Japan Hot Overseas (Billboard Japan)	12
Lithuania Airplay (TopHit)	34
New Zealand Hot Singles (RMNZ)	15
Nigeria Bubbling Under Top 100 (TurnTable)	4
Nigeria Top International Songs (TurnTable)	22
Panama Anglo Airplay (Monitor Latino)	11
South Korea BGM (Circle)	139
UK Singles Sales (OCC)	9
US Billboard Hot 100	95
US Adult Pop Airplay (Billboard)	22
US Hot R&B/Hip-Hop Songs (Billboard)	24
US Pop Airplay (Billboard)	32
US R&B/Hip-Hop Airplay (Billboard)	7
US Rhythmic Airplay (Billboard)	20

=== Monthly charts ===
Chart (2025)	Peak position
Lithuania Airplay (TopHit)	52

=== Year-end charts ===
Chart (2025)	Peak position
US Billboard Adult R&B Airplay Songs	25
US Billboard R&B/Hip-Hop Airplay Songs	31

== Release history ==
Region	Date	Format	Label	Ref.
Various	June 6, 2025	Digital download; streaming	Gamma	
United States	June 10, 2025	Contemporary hit radio	Gamma	
