= Outside (Mariah Carey song) =

1997 song by Mariah Carey

Song by Mariah Carey

from the album Butterfly
- Released: September 10, 1997
- Recorded: 1996–1997
- Studio: Crave (New York): WallyWorld (California); The Hit Factory (New York City)
- Genre: Pop; soul
- Length: 4:46
- Label: Columbia
- Composers: Mariah Carey; Walter Afanasieff
- Lyricist: Mariah Carey
- Producers: Mariah Carey; Walter Afanasieff

Audio
- "Outside" on YouTube

"Outside" is a song recorded by American singer Mariah Carey for her sixth studio album, Butterfly (1997). She produced the pop and soul track and composed its music with Walter Afanasieff. The ballad's composition features drums, guitars, synthesizers, and piano. Its lyrics, written by Carey, were inspired by traumatic events she experienced as a biracial girl and express her feelings of alienation due to her mixed-race identity.

Music critics thought the lyrics also had resonance for people with marginalized identities aside from race and compared them to other songs by Carey. Some felt "Outside" did not fit in with the album's hip-hop musical direction while others considered it one of the better tracks. The song has since received critical analysis regarding its impact on Carey's public image as a biracial woman and as a role model for the LGBT community.

== Development and release ==
After returning to the United States from her Daydream World Tour in mid-1996, American singer Mariah Carey began preliminary work on the follow-up to her 1995 album Daydream. She completed the song "Outside" as one of the first compositions intended for Butterfly (1997), her sixth studio album on Columbia Records. After recording occurred from November 1996 to August 1997, the album was released on September 10. A change in style due to her marital separation from Tommy Mottola, the head of Columbia, Butterfly moved Carey's music closer to hip-hop from the ballads she had become known for since her 1990 debut.

"Outside" is the twelfth and final track on the album's standard edition. It was not released as a single and Carey never performed the song live. Columbia and Legacy Recordings later included "Outside" on the compilation album Playlist: The Very Best of Mariah Carey (2010). In 2022, an a cappella version was released as part of the 25th anniversary reissue of Butterfly.

== Composition ==
=== Music ===
"Outside" is a pop and soul song influenced by gospel music. Composed as a ballad with a slow tempo, the track lasts for four minutes and forty-six seconds. Its melody is mellow and derived from doo-wop. Andrew Chan, author of Why Mariah Carey Matters, said it "meanders, practically hookless, like an unplanned improvisation". Carey and Walter Afanasieff composed the music and produced the song; Cory Rooney acted as co-producer. It features bass guitar (Artie Reynolds), drums (Nathaniel Townsley), electronic wind instrument (Michael Phillips), guitars (Michael Cirro), Hammond B-3 organ (Gary Montoute), keyboards (Afanasieff, Donald Parker, Dan Shea), synthesizers (Afanasieff), and piano (Parker). According to Townsley, Carey requested a subdued production with a simple hi-hat beat and quiet music during the verses which would intensify toward the refrains.

Dana Jon Chappelle and Mike Scott recorded "Outside" with assistance from Ian Dalsemer in New York at Crave Studios and The Hit Factory, and in California at WallyWorld. After recording occurred, Mick Guzauski and Scott mixed the song at Crave and Bob Ludwig conducted mastering at Gateway in Portland, Maine. Biographer Chris Nickson described the result as Carey "stripped to the basics, lyrically and musically".

=== Lyrics and vocals ===
"Outside" marked the first time Carey wrote a song about her perceptions of racial otherness. It was inspired by her childhood feelings of inferiority due to colorism as the biracial daughter of a White woman and a Black man. Carey's experience was shaped by incidents including her parents' divorce, kindergarten teachers questioning why she drew her father brown, and being called a nigger by a group of girls. According to Carey, the "lyrics are about mainly being an outsider, growing up biracial, and that being the bane of my existence then in so many ways". They are structured in two verses, a chorus that repeats twice, and a bridge. All but two lines lack rhyme. Carey expresses being "Neither here nor there / Always somewhat out of place everywhere" and "Ambiguous / Without a sense of belonging to touch". Similar sentiments are repeated throughout; there is no shift from melancholy to happiness.

Critics classified "Outside" as an anthem, a hymn, a lament, and a meditation. Several thought the song could be relevant for other marginalized identities. Some suggested the lyrics were influenced by Carey's career experiences (Note: Slant Magazine's Rich Juzwiak suggested the song could be about Carey's race but also her sense of place regarding her career. For Grammy.com writer Taj Mayfield, the song is Carey's response to being the subject of "peculiar criticisms regarding her racial identity throughout her career". PopMatters contributor Peter Piatkowski viewed the song in part as a response to how Columbia "played up the ambiguity of her racial identity, hoping to downplay her Blackness".) and others thought they discussed existence or the difficulties in a romantic relationship. HuffPost writer Ian Kumamoto said the song shares how sadness accompanies being different. According to Jon Pareles of The New York Times, Carey concedes there is no resolution to her circumstance.

"Outside"
Carey's vocals become more prominent during the song's climax.

Carey uses a wide vocal range on "Outside"; Peter Piatkowski of PopMatters likened it to a Broadway theatre-style performance. Her voice shifts from sotto voce at the beginning to full-throated usage by the climax. A clear transition occurs during the bridge, at which point Carey "attempts to release her pain through despair and anger", according to scholar Shara Rambarran.

== Critical reception and analysis ==
Critics judged "Outside" against other tracks on Butterfly. Several considered the song one of the album's highlights upon its release. Others thought it did not fit in with the record's broader hip-hop production. Reviewing retrospectively, Vibe's Preezy Brown felt "Outside" was one of the more authentic compositions on Butterfly while Billboard's Jon O'Brien said it was overproduced. Sjarif Goldstein of the Honolulu Star-Advertiser named it the best non-single of her career.

"Outside" received thematic comparisons to other songs in Carey's discography. J. D. Considine of The Baltimore Sun called it a rare work in her catalog that addresses a serious topic. In The Guardian, Hadley Freeman categorized "Outside" as one of Carey's more personal songs in contrast to "Hero" (1993) and "We Belong Together" (2005). Variety's Danielle Turchiano likened "Outside" to "Looking In" (1995), "Close My Eyes" (1997), and her cover version of Phil Collins's "Against All Odds (Take a Look at Me Now)" (1999). She said they all serve as examples in which Carey employed a "poetic approach to the trials and tribulations in her childhood". New York Observer writer Jonathan Bernstein viewed "Outside" as an elaboration on her debut single, "Vision of Love" (1990), in which she alluded to feeling alienated.

The song has received critical analysis regarding its impact on Carey's public image. Rambarran argued "Outside" contributed to her status as a role model for the LGBT community through relatable lyrics regarding marginalization. In her book Crossing B(l)ack: Mixed-Race Identity in Modern American Fiction and Culture, Sika Dagbovie-Mullins said "Outside" represented Carey's varied exploitation of mulatta stereotypes as she can sing of not belonging, yet act as a sex symbol in other media. Writing for The Ringer, Kyla Marshell thought Carey created the song despite knowing it could cast her as a tragic mulatto.

== Credits and personnel ==
=== Recording ===
- Recorded at Crave Studios (New York), WallyWorld (California), The Hit Factory (New York City)
- Mixed at Crave Studios (New York)
- Mastered at Gateway Mastering (Portland, Maine)

=== Personnel ===
- Mariah Carey – lyricist, composer, producer, arranger, lead vocals
- Walter Afanasieff – composer, producer, arranger, keyboards, synthesizers, programming
- Cory Rooney – co-producer
- Dana Jon Chappelle – engineering
- Michael Cirro – guitar
- Ian Dalsemer – assistant engineering
- Ron Grant – additional arranger
- Mick Guzauski – mixing
- Bob Ludwig – mastering
- Gary Montoute – Hammond B-3 organ
- Donald Parker – piano/keyboards
- Michael Phillips – electronic wind instrument
- Artie Reynolds – bass guitar
- Mike Scott – engineering, mixing
- Dan Shea – additional keyboards, drum and rhythm programming, sound design and computer programming
- Nathaniel Townsley – drums
