= Clever (musician) =

American rapper (born 1985)

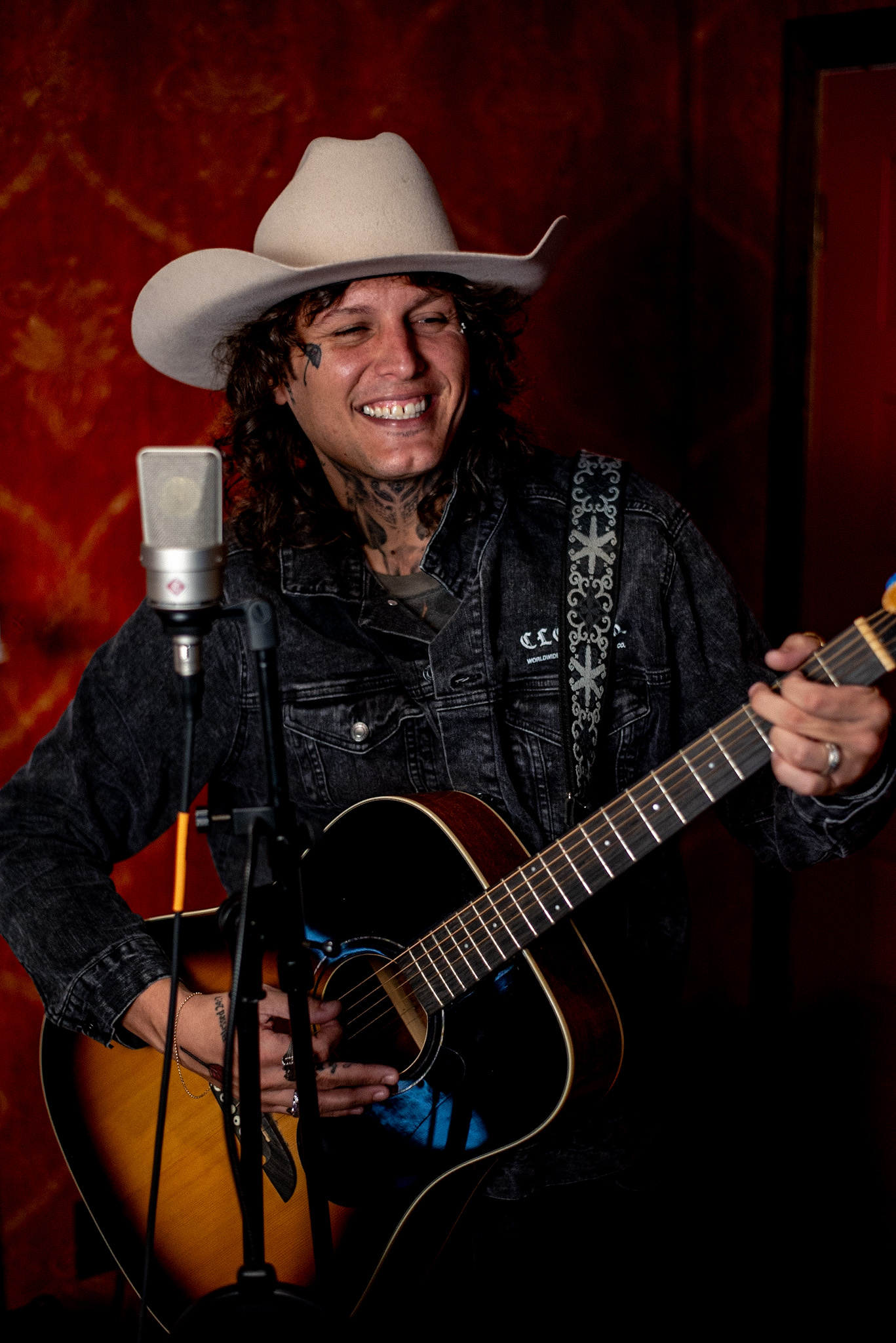
- Clever in 2024

Background information
- Born: Joshua Tyler Huie; July 8, 1985 (age 41); Gadsden, Alabama, U.S.
- Genres: Pop rap; emo; R&B; electronic
- Occupations: Rapper; singer; songwriter; record producer; author
- Instruments: Vocals; guitar; piano
- Years active: 1998–present
- Labels: Ricochet; StreamCut (current); Grade A; Posty; Republic; The DisPensary (former)
- Spouse: Lyndsie Farris (m. 2020)
- Children: 2
- Website: whoisclever.com

Joshua Tyler Huie (born July 8, 1985), known professionally as Clever, is an American rapper, singer, and songwriter. He gained recognition for his guest appearance on Juice Wrld's 2019 song "Ring Ring". He toured with Juice WRLD on the latter's "Death Race for Love" tour and has performed at Lollapalooza, Rolling Loud, Firefly. He has also recorded songs with several artists including Chris Brown, Snoop Dogg, Lil Wayne, Polo G, Rylo Rodriguez, NLE Choppa, Diplo, Rich Homie Quan, and Lil Baby among others. He signed with Post Malone's Posty Co. and Lil Bibby's Grade A Productions, in a joint venture with Republic Records to release his debut studio album, Crazy (2021), which failed to chart. By March 2024, he had over 650 million streams on Spotify.

== Early life ==
Joshua Tyler Huie was born in Gadsden, Alabama. He began writing poetry at 11 years old and transitioned into writing hip-hop music at 13 years old. He attended Emma Sansom High School where he excelled in sports and had planned on pursuing baseball professionally but turned down several college baseball scholarship offers after deciding to pursue a music career. He started battle rapping locally at 14 years of age and at 16 he was part of a radio segment where he would freestyle battle callers live on the air. Huie cites Jay Z and Led Zeppelin as musical influences.

His stage name was derived from a battle rap when he was 14 years old. While "battling," a win often is referred to as a "W," and a loss as an "L." His stage name, "Clever," originated from a lyric he used, "You can call me Clever, because I won't 'C' an 'L,' ever."

== Career ==
Huie released his album "1nce More" in 2006 and battle rapped on several episodes of BET's 106 & Park which led to him performing on the BET battle rap show, "Spring Bling," which he won. He released various recordings including "Nobody Can Save You" featuring SwizZz in 2013. In 2014, Huie co-wrote and recorded "Payday" (with Snoop Dogg) and began writing music for other artists as well as working closely with David Foster.

In 2018, rapper Lil Bibby heard Huie's music and passed it along to fellow rapper Juice WRLD, who then shared Huie's music on his Instagram page. After speaking with Juice WRLD, Huie flew out to Los Angeles and began recording with him which led to them recording the single, "Ring, Ring" which charted at No. 5 on Billboard's "Bubbling Under Hot 100" on March 23, 2019. They toured together on the "Death Race for Love" tour in 2019. After Juice WRLD died on December 8, 2019, Huie stated that Juice WRLD's "co-signing" of his music opened a lot of doors for him and that he had a major impact on the trajectory of his music career.

In 2019, Huie's single "Stick By My Side", featuring rapper NLE Choppa, caught the attention of rapper and singer Post Malone on social media, who would go on to sign Huie to his record label, Posty Co., in a joint-venture with Lil Bibby's label Grade A Productions and Republic Records. Huie released his debut studio album, Crazy (2021), which included the single, "Call Me Nobody" (featuring Lil Wayne and Huie's son Isaiah Lyric).

In 2020, Canadian singer Justin Bieber contacted Huie on Instagram asking him if he would like to record a song with him; this resulted Huie appearing on Bieber's single "Forever," which charted at No. 24 on Billboard's Hot 100 chart. Huie recorded the single "Penelope" with William which charted at No. 1 on Finland's singles chart for 21 weeks in 2020. In 2024, he released a self titled country music EP which received favorable reviews.

== Discography ==
=== Studio albums ===
List of studio albums, with selected details
Title	Studio album details
Crazy	Released: March 12, 2021; Label: Grade A, Posty, Republic; Format: CD, digital download, streaming, vinyl
Lonely	Released: March 28, 2023; Label: Ricochet; Format: Digital download, streaming
Coyote	Released: October 3, 2025; Label: Ricochet & StreamCut; Format: Digital download, streaming

=== Mixtapes ===
List of mixtapes, with selected details
Title	Mixtape details
1nce More	Released: 2006; Label: JuggerKnot; Format: CD, digital download, streaming
Clevermind	Released: September 2, 2010; Label: Self-released; Format: CD, digital download, streaming
Cleveryday	Released: January 1, 2012; Label: Self-released; Format: CD, digital download, streaming
Mayhem	Released: 2012; Label: Self-released; Format: CD, digital download, streaming
The Hybrid	Released: December 2012; Label: Self-released; Format: CD, digital download, streaming
Hypochondriac	Released: March 17, 2013; Label: Self-released; Format: CD, digital download, streaming
Puns N' Roses	Released: April 20, 2013; Label: Self-released; Format: CD, digital download, streaming
Clever	Released: July 2013; Label: Self-released; Format: Digital download, streaming
Dead Heart	Released: July 20, 2015; Label: Self-released; Format: Digital download, streaming
Fashion Helps Depression (with Swayy Mula and Karltin Bankz)	Released: July 7, 2023; Label: PayHouse Music Group; Format: Digital download, streaming

=== Extended plays ===
List of EPs, with selected details
Title	EP details
Who Is Clever?	Released: October 11, 2019; Label: Grade A, The DisPensary; Format: Digital download, streaming
Clever	Released: October 25, 2024; Label: Ricochet, StreamCut; Format: Digital download, streaming

== Other ventures ==
Clever's single releases
Year	Title	Peak chart positions									Notes
Year	Title	US	AUS	AUT	FI	NED	NZ	SWE	SWI	UK	Notes
Collaborative releases
2019	"Ring, Ring"	105	—	—	—	—	—	—	—	—	(with Juice WRLD)
2020	"Forever"	24	29	28	—	3	32	10	33	29	(with Justin Bieber and Post Malone)
2020	"Penelope"	—	—	—	1	—	—	—	—	—	(with William)
2021	"Life's a Mess II"	97	—	—	—	—	—	—	—	—	(with Juice WRLD and Post Malone)

Singles (collaborations)

- 2024 – "Authentic" (with Rich Homie Quan)
- 2021 – "Life's a Mess II" (with Post Malone and Juice WRLD)
- 2021 – "Call Me Nobody" (with Lil Wayne and Isaiah Lyric)
- 2021 – "Skittles" (with Lil Baby)
- 2021 – "Rolls Royce Umbrella" (with Chris Brown)
- 2020 – "Forever" (with Justin Bieber and Post Malone)
- 2020 – "Real Life Stuff" (with Diplo and Julia Michaels)
- 2020 – "Apartments" (with NoCap and Rylo Rodriguez)
- 2020 – "Penelope" (with William)
- 2020 – "In My Hands" (with Zero 9:36 and Travis Barker)
- 2019 – "Ring, Ring" (with Juice WRLD)
- 2019 – "Stick by my Side" (with NLE Choppa)
- 2019 – "All In" (with Polo G and G Herbo)
- 2014 – "Payday" (with Snoop Dogg)
