= Legaci (band) =

Filipino-American R&B group

- Origin: San Francisco Bay Area, California, U.S.
- Genres: R&B; pop
- Years active: 1997–present
- Label: Kamikaze Records (2003–2005)
- Members: Chris Abad; Del Lazaro; Micah Tolentino; Jason Atencion
- Past members: Mathew Arcilla; John Daria; Jason Guison; Chris Mamitag; Dominic Manuel

Legaci is a Filipino American R&B band from the San Francisco Bay Area, California. The current line-up consists of Micah Tolentino(keyboard, vocals), Jason Atencion, Chris Abad, and Del Lazaro (guitar/keyboard/vocals). Their dream was not only to succeed in the music industry, but to give Asian-Americans mainstream relevance. The band released their debut album Little Black Book in 2006 (under a different roster) and continued this momentum with release of Sessions-EP in 2008.

Legaci rose to fame through their YouTube channel with over 140 thousand subscribers and 23 million views. Their cover of Justin Bieber's smash hit "Baby" caught the attention of Bieber and his manager Scooter Braun, and landed Legaci the opportunity to tour the world with the teen sensation as his official backing group. Bieber reserved a special acapella slot in each of his concerts for Legaci to showcase their talents. With Bieber, they performed in over 30 countries and approximately 300 cities. Legaci maintains over 37 thousand “likes” on Facebook and over 120 thousand combined followers on Twitter as of January 2013.

Their most recent album is the "Driven-EP"

== History ==
=== Early Career (1997–2001) ===
Formed in 1997, Legaci's original members consisted of Mathew Arcilla (guitar/vocals), Jason Atencion (vocals), John Daria (vocals), and Micah Tolentino (guitar/keyboard/vocals). The founding members of Legaci got together under the leadership of their late manager, Mike Viernes of Point Blank Entertainment. They performed cover songs and original pieces at various parties, talent shows, cultural events and competitions throughout California. In 2001, Legaci self-published and released their first CD single "Make Sweet Love" with an accompanying music video to promote themselves to their fans as well as potential music industry contacts. The group performed as the opening act for 107.9FM KDND's EndFest at Sacramento, California in 2001 as a result of their first-place victory in a local "Battle of the Bands" competition. They opened for artists such as LFO, Vertical Horizon, Uncle Kracker, Dream, 3LW, and Smash Mouth.

=== Little Black Book (2002–06) ===
Legaci continued to perform seeing the departure of Mathew Arcilla, and the addition of Chris Abad, Jason Guison, and Chris Mamitag. They also worked on recording their first studio album. What started as an independent project soon changed when Kamikaze Records, a local independent label, picked them up in late 2003 and helped to push the release of their album, Little Black Book on March 14, 2006.

=== Sessions (2006–09) ===
Legaci and Kamikaze Records parted ways late 2006. Legaci continued to perform and went back into the studio to start work on their next album, Sessions. With new member Delfin Lazaro, they pushed the Sessions EP in 2007, with plans to finish a full album in the future.

=== YouTube and Justin Bieber (2007–12) ===
In late 2007, Legaci turned to YouTube as a method of promotion to gain more of a fan base and attention. Over the course of 2 years, their channel has accumulated over 1 million unique views and their videos have cumulatively reached over 34 million views, collaborating with several other rising Asian-American YouTube stars.

Their cover of Bieber's song "Baby" with YouTube users Cathy Nguyen and Traphik, caught the attention of Bieber's manager Scooter Braun. He contacted them the day after the video was posted and had Legaci rehearsing the very next week for the promotion run of Bieber's "My World 2.0" album. The group performed with Bieber in 30 different countries around the world.

=== Driven (2011–present) ===
After 2 years of being on the road with Bieber for the My World Tour, Legaci released their debut single entitled "All Day" on December 20, 2011, which was followed by the release of "Never Got Over You" on May 29, 2012. Their Driven EP was released on December 11, 2012.

January 2013, Legaci competed on "The Winner is" that aired on NBC and signed a one-year contract. Summer 2013, Legaci made the Top 20 for XFactor on FOX but due to contract issues with NBC they were unable to continue on the show.

In 2014, Legaci auditioned on Season 9 of America's Got Talent. In their audition, they got praised by the judges and moved onto Judgement Week, however they did not continue on.

== Members ==
=== Current members ===
- Jason Atencion - vocals (1997–present)
- Micah Tolentino - guitar/keyboard/vocals (1997–present)
- Chris Abad - vocals (2003–present)
- Del Lazaro - guitar/keyboard/vocals (2006–present)

=== Previous members ===
- Mathew Arcilla (1997–2001)
- John Daria (1997–2000)
- Jason Guison (2002–06)
- Chris Mamitag (2002–06)
- Dominic Manuel (2009–11)

== Discography ==
Studio Albums

- Little Black Book (2006) (Kamikaze Records)
- Sessions (2007) (Legaci)
- Driven EP (December 11, 2012)

Compilations

- Joints Exclusive: Volume 1 (2008) (Phase1 Records)

Singles

- "Make Sweet Love" (2001) (Legaci)
- "All Day" (2011) (Legaci)
- "Never Got Over You" (2012) (Legaci)
- "When You Love Her" (2012) (Legaci)
