= Available (song) =

Song by Justin Bieber

from the album Changes
- Released: February 14, 2020
- Genre: R&B; soul; trap
- Length: 3:15
- Label: Def Jam; RBMG
- Songwriter(s): Justin Bieber; Jason Boyd; Bernard Harvey; JaVale McGee; Ashley Boyd; Derrick Milano
- Producer(s): HARV; Pierre; Poo Bear

"Available" is a song by Canadian singer Justin Bieber from his fifth studio album, Changes (2020).

== Critical reception ==
Michael Cragg from The Observer branded the song as "tactile." Annie Zaleski of The A.V. Club panned the "rattling trap rhythms" of the song.

== Music video ==
On March 10, 2020, an accompanying nature visual for "Available" was released exclusively for Apple Music subscribers. Simultaneously, a preview of the video was shared by Apple Music and Bieber, respectively, via Twitter. The visual stood as the fourth and final video of Bieber's Apple Music "Nature" series. Within the music video, Bieber plays a piano covered with graffiti in the middle of a landscape surrounded by mountains and red-tinged skies, with his surroundings being described as "a desert-like setting." Street-art-style animation is included, reminiscent of the piano's style.

Later a dance video for "Available" was published as a part of the project "CHANGES: The Movement"

== Charts ==
Chart performance for "Available"
Chart (2020)	Peak position
Australia (ARIA)	99
Canada (Canadian Hot 100)	83
Slovakia (Singles Digitál Top 100)	70
US Bubbling Under Hot 100 (Billboard)	8
US Rolling Stone Top 100	75

== Certifications ==
Certifications for "Available"
Region	Certification	Certified units/sales
Brazil (Pro-Música Brasil)	Gold	20,000^{‡}
^{‡} Sales+streaming figures based on certification alone.
