= The Celebration of Mimi =

2024–2025 concert residency and tour by Mariah Carey

- Residency and tour concert by Mariah Carey
- Promotional poster
- Location: United States; Brazil; Asia; Australia; United Kingdom
- Associated album: The Emancipation of Mimi; Here for It All
- Start date: April 12, 2024
- End date: November 2, 2025
- Legs: 5
- No. of shows: 47
Mariah Carey concert chronology
Merry Christmas One and All! (2023)	The Celebration of Mimi (2024–2025)	Mariah Carey's Christmas Time (2024–2025)
Mariah Carey concert residency chronology
The Butterfly Returns (2018–2020)	The Celebration of Mimi (2024–2025)	Mariah Carey's Christmas Time (2024–2025)

The Celebration of Mimi was the fifth concert residency and fifteenth concert tour by American singer-songwriter Mariah Carey. Launched in 2024 to commemorate the 20th anniversary of her tenth studio album, The Emancipation of Mimi (2005), the project began as a residency at Dolby Live in the Las Vegas Valley, Nevada, running from April 12, 2024 to February 15, 2025, for a total of 24 shows.

Originally planned as an eight-date engagement, the residency was expanded with additional legs due to demand, with new dates announced on April 11 and July 22, respectively. It was later extended into an international concert tour, with performances across China and Brazil in 2024, followed by dates throughout Asia and headlining performances at various festivals in 2025. The tour concluded on November 2, 2025, in Yokohama, Japan.

== Set list ==
The following set list is obtained from the April 12, 2024 concert.

"Book Intro" (contains elements of "Alone in Love," "I Don't Wanna Cry," "Vanishing" and "Love Takes Time")

Act I

1. "Vision of Love"
2. "Emotions"
3. "Make It Happen"
4. "Can't Let Go / I'll Be There" (with Trey Lorenz)
5. "Dreamlover" (with extended outro)

"Dreamlover" (Def Club Mix) (video interlude)

Act II

6. "Hero" (contains elements of "Music Box")
7. "Without You" (with extended outro)
8. "Fantasy" (Bad Boy Fantasy)
9. "Always Be My Baby"
10. "Looking In" (preceded by a piano solo)
11. Medley:
  1. "Butterfly"
  2. "Babydoll"
  3. "Breakdown"
  4. "Close My Eyes"
  5. "The Roof (Back in Time)" (contains elements of "The Roof (When I Feel the Need)")
  6. "My All"
12. "Honey / Heartbreaker" (mashup)

"Loverboy" / "Don't Stop (Funkin' 4 Jamaica)" / "Didn't Mean to Turn You On" / "Last Night a DJ Saved My Life" / "Sunflowers for Alfred Roy" (dancers interlude)

Act III

13. "I Wish You Knew"
14. "It's Like That" (contains elements of "Sucker M.C.'s" and "Here We Go" by Run-DMC)
15. "Say Somethin'"
16. "Your Girl"
17. "Shake It Off" (contains elements of "Don't" by Bryson Tiller)

"So Lonely (One & Only Part II)" / "Secret Love" (contains elements of "Sprung") / "Makin' It Last All Night (What It Do)" (dancers interlude)

Act IV

18. "Circles"
19. "Don't Forget About Us"
20. "We Belong Together" (contains elements of "Mimi's Late Night Valentine's Mix")

Encore

21. "Fly Like a Bird" (with extended outro)

=== Notes ===
- Heidi Klum and Tyra Banks joined Carey onstage during the performance of "Say Somethin'" on the fifth night.
- Starting on the ninth night, the "Fly Like a Bird" outro was replaced by the "Hopeful Child Remix" of "Portrait." The "Fly Like a Bird" outro was brought back on the seventeenth night.
- From the twelfth to the sixteenth nights, "Circles" was replaced by a snippet of "All I Want for Christmas Is You" played by the band while Carey walked back onstage instead. It was later cut from the set list on the seventeenth night.
- The "Make It Last Remix" of "Thank God I Found You" was performed during the 2025 shows, between "My All" and the "Honey / Heartbreaker" mashup.

== Critical reception ==
Critics compared The Celebration of Mimi favorably to Carey's previous residencies. Las Vegas Review-Journal columnist John Katsilometes called it "a more inspired variation of the Caesars show, thoughtful and creative with its autobiographical through-line". According to Tim Chan of Billboard, "while Carey has performed in Vegas before, she has never sounded or looked better." People's Mark Gray and Jason Sheeler said "her latest spectacular show was a definite crowd pleaser".

== Shows ==
Date	City	Country	Venue
April 12, 2024	Paradise (Note: Labeled as Las Vegas in promotional material.)	United States	Dolby Live
April 13, 2024	Paradise	United States	Dolby Live
April 17, 2024	Paradise	United States	Dolby Live
April 19, 2024	Paradise	United States	Dolby Live
April 20, 2024	Paradise	United States	Dolby Live
April 24, 2024	Paradise	United States	Dolby Live
April 26, 2024	Paradise	United States	Dolby Live
April 27, 2024	Paradise	United States	Dolby Live
July 26, 2024	Paradise	United States	Dolby Live
July 27, 2024	Paradise	United States	Dolby Live
July 31, 2024	Paradise	United States	Dolby Live
August 2, 2024	Paradise	United States	Dolby Live
August 3, 2024	Paradise	United States	Dolby Live
August 7, 2024	Paradise	United States	Dolby Live
August 9, 2024	Paradise	United States	Dolby Live
August 10, 2024	Paradise	United States	Dolby Live
January 31, 2025	Paradise	United States	Dolby Live
February 1, 2025	Paradise	United States	Dolby Live
February 5, 2025	Paradise	United States	Dolby Live
February 7, 2025	Paradise	United States	Dolby Live
February 8, 2025	Paradise	United States	Dolby Live
February 12, 2025	Paradise	United States	Dolby Live
February 14, 2025	Paradise	United States	Dolby Live
February 15, 2025	Paradise	United States	Dolby Live

== International shows ==
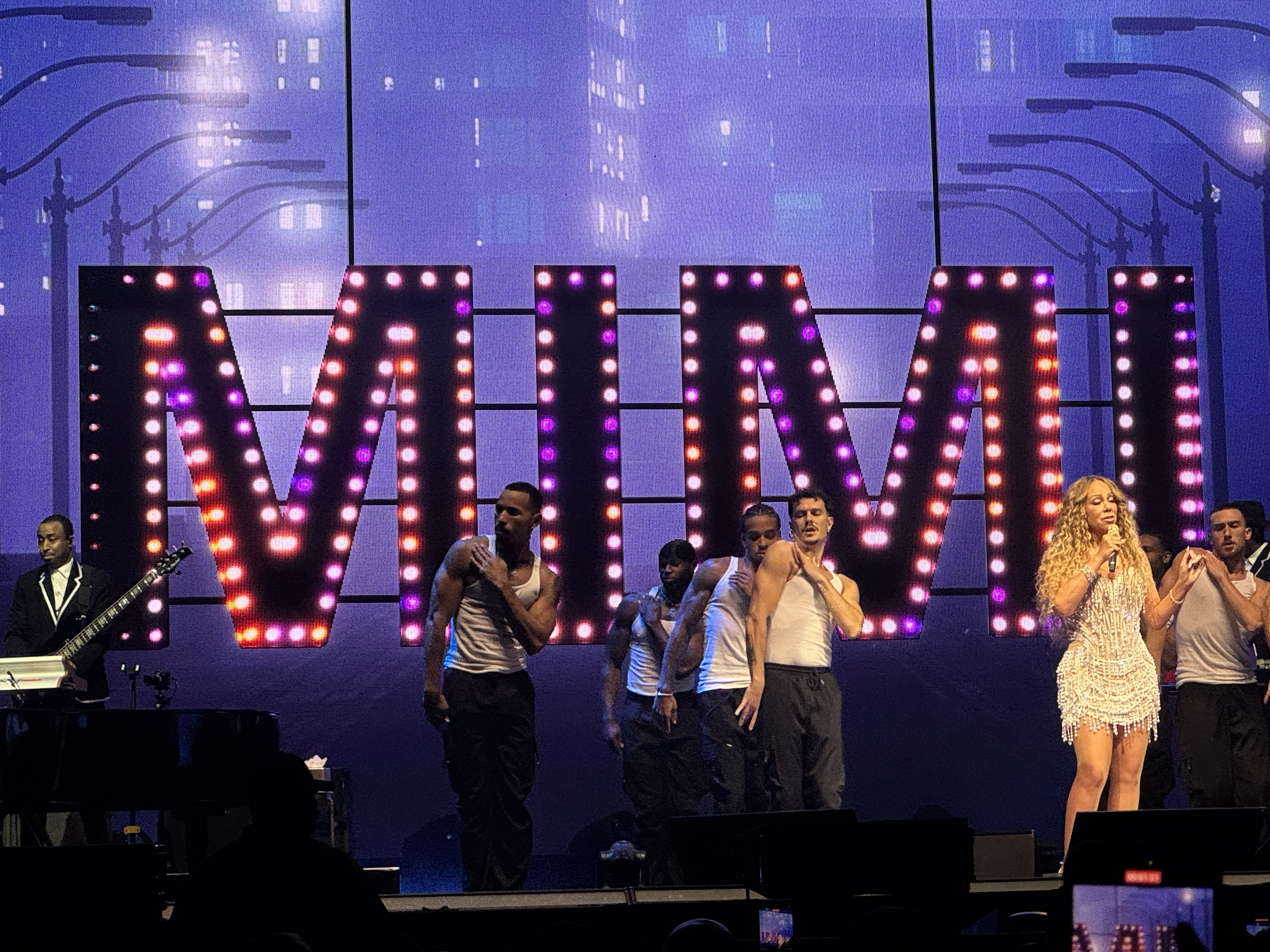
Carey performing in Pasay, Philippines, on October 14, 2025

The Celebration of Mimi was adapted into an international concert tour in two occasions. The first one was in September 2024, performing two concerts in Beijing, China, as well as a concert in São Paulo, Brazil. Carey further played a second Brazilian concert in Rock in Rio, although with a very different setlist. The setlist largely followed the Paradise (Las Vegas) concerts, although with some alterations, including the addition of post-The Emancipation of Mimi songs in the setlist. The tour received critical acclaim, with Brazilian publications pointing out the São Paulo show as the "biggest in her career" and describing her vocal performance as "potent". New legs of this international concert tour adaptation also visited Asia, to celebrate the 20th anniversary of The Emancipation of Mimi.

=== Set list ===
September 15, 18 and 20, 2024

The following set list is obtained from the September 20, 2024 concert.

"Book Intro" (contains elements of "Alone in Love," "I Don't Wanna Cry," "Vanishing" and "Love Takes Time")

Act I

1. "Love Takes Time"
2. "Emotions"
3. "Can't Let Go / I'll Be There" (with Trey Lorenz)
4. "Dreamlover" (with extended outro)

"Dreamlover" (Def Club Mix) (video interlude)

Act II

5. "Hero" (contains elements of "Music Box")
6. "Without You" (with extended outro)
7. "Always Be My Baby"
8. "Looking In" (preceded by a piano solo)
9. Medley:
  1. "Butterfly"
  2. "Babydoll"
  3. "Breakdown"
  4. "The Roof (Back in Time)" (contains elements of "The Roof (When I Feel the Need)")
  5. "My All"
10. "Honey / Heartbreaker" (mashup)

"Loverboy" / "Don't Stop (Funkin' 4 Jamaica)" / "Didn't Mean to Turn You On" / "Last Night a DJ Saved My Life" / "Boy (I Need You)" (band introductions)

Act III

11. "I Wish You Knew"
12. "It's Like That" (contains elements of "Sucker M.C.'s" and "Here We Go" by Run-DMC)
13. "Say Somethin'"
14. "Your Girl"
15. "Shake It Off" (contains elements of "Don't" by Bryson Tiller)

"Get Your Number / To the Floor" (dancers interlude)

Act IV

16. "#Beautiful" (with Daniel Moore II)
17. "I Know What You Want"
18. "Obsessed"
19. "I'm That Chick" (with extended outro)

Act V

20. "Circles"
21. "Don't Forget About Us"
22. "We Belong Together" (contains elements of "Mimi's Late Night Valentine's Mix," with remix outro)

Encore

23. "I Want to Know What Love Is" (with extended outro)
September 22, 2024

The following set list is obtained from the September 22, 2024 concert.

"Anytime You Need a Friend" (Boriqua Tribe Mix) (video intro)

Act I

1. "Obsessed"
2. "Honey / Heartbreaker" (mashup)
3. "Touch My Body"
4. "Can't Let Go / I'll Be There" (with Trey Lorenz)
5. "Always Be My Baby"
6. "My All"
7. "Emotions"
8. "Dreamlover"
9. "Hero" (with extended outro)

"Dreamlover" (Def Club Mix) / "Always Be My Baby" (Always Club Mix) / "Fantasy" (Def Club Mix, contains elements of the "Def Drums Mix") (dancers interlude)

Act II

10. "Fantasy" (Bad Boy Fantasy)
11. "It's Like That" (contains elements of "Sucker M.C.'s" and "Here We Go" by Run-DMC)
12. "Say Somethin'"
13. "I Know What You Want"
14. "Shake It Off" (contains elements of "Don't" by Bryson Tiller)
15. "Don't Forget About Us"
16. "We Belong Together" (contains elements of "Mimi's Late Night Valentine's Mix")
17. "Fly Like a Bird" (with extended outro)

Encore

18. "I Want to Know What Love Is" (with extended outro)
May 10–17, 2025

The following set list is obtained from the May 10, 2025 concert.

"Book Intro" (contains elements of "Alone in Love," "I Don't Wanna Cry," "Vanishing" and "Love Takes Time")

Act I

1. "Vision of Love"
2. "Emotions"
3. "Make It Happen"
4. "Dreamlover" (with extended outro)

"Dreamlover" (Def Club Mix) (video interlude)

Act II

5. "Hero" (contains elements of "Music Box")
6. "Without You" (with extended outro)
7. "Fantasy" (Bad Boy Fantasy)
8. "Always Be My Baby"

Act III

9. "Looking In" (preceded by a piano solo)
10. Medley:
  1. "Butterfly"
  2. "Babydoll"
  3. "Breakdown"
  4. "Close My Eyes"
  5. "The Roof (Back in Time)" (contains elements of "The Roof (When I Feel the Need)")
  6. "My All"
11. "Honey / Heartbreaker" (mashup)

"Loverboy" / "Don't Stop (Funkin' 4 Jamaica)" / "Didn't Mean to Turn You On" / "Last Night a DJ Saved My Life" / "Boy (I Need You)" / "Sunflowers for Alfred Roy" (dancers interlude)

Act IV

12. "I Wish You Knew"
13. "It's Like That" (contains elements of "Sucker M.C.'s" and "Here We Go" by Run-DMC)
14. "Say Somethin'"
15. "Your Girl"
16. "Touch My Body"
17. "Shake It Off" (contains elements of "Don't" by Bryson Tiller)

"So Lonely (One & Only Part II)" / "Secret Love" (contains elements of "Sprung") / "Makin' It Last All Night (What It Do" (dancers interlude)

Act V

18. "Obsessed"
19. "Circles"
20. "Don't Forget About Us"
21. "We Belong Together" (contains elements of "Mimi's Late Night Valentine's Mix")

Encore

22. "Fly Like a Bird" (with extended outro)
August 2–15, 2025

The following set list is obtained from the August 15, 2025 concert.

"Thirsty" (intro)

Act I

1. "Type Dangerous"
2. "Emotions"
3. "Make It Happen"
4. "Can't Let Go / I'll Be There" (with Trey Lorenz)
5. "Vision of Love"
6. "Dreamlover" (with extended outro)

"Dreamlover" (Def Club Mix) (video interlude)

Act II

7. "Hero"
8. "Without You" (with extended outro)
9. "Fantasy" (Bad Boy Fantasy)
10. "Always Be My Baby"
11. "My All"
12. "Honey / Heartbreaker" (mashup)

"Loverboy" / "Don't Stop (Funkin' 4 Jamaica)" / "Didn't Mean to Turn You On" / "Last Night a DJ Saved My Life" / "Boy (I Need You)" / "Sunflowers for Alfred Roy" (dancers interlude)

Act III

13. "#Beautiful" (with Daniel Moore II)
14. "Obsessed"
15. "Touch My Body"
16. "Say Somethin'"
17. "Your Girl"
18. "Sugar Sweet"
19. "I Know What You Want"
20. "Shake It Off" (contains elements of "Don't" by Bryson Tiller)

"So Lonely (One & Only Part II)" / "Secret Love" (contains elements of "Sprung") / "Makin' It Last All Night (What It Do)" (dancers interlude)

Act IV

21. "It's Like That" (contains elements of "Sucker M.C.'s" and "Here We Go" by Run-DMC)
22. "Don't Forget About Us"
23. "We Belong Together" (contains elements of "Mimi's Late Night Valentine's Mix")
24. "Fly Like a Bird" (with extended outro)
September 13, 2025

"Thirsty" (intro)

Act I

1. "Type Dangerous"
2. "Emotions"
3. "Vision of Love"
4. "Dreamlover" (with extended outro)

"Dreamlover" (Def Club Mix) (video interlude)

Act II

5. "Hero"
6. "Without You" (with extended outro)
7. "Fantasy" (Bad Boy Fantasy)
8. "Always Be My Baby"
9. "My All"
10. "Honey / Heartbreaker" (mashup)

"Anytime You Need a Friend" (Boriqua Tribe Mix) / "Always Be My Baby" (Always Club Mix) / "Fantasy" (Def Club Mix, contains elements of the "Def Drums Mix," dancers interlude)

Act III

11. "Obsessed"
12. "Touch My Body"
13. "Sugar Sweet"
14. "I Know What You Want"
15. "Shake It Off" (contains elements of "Don't" by Bryson Tiller)

"So Lonely (One & Only Part II)" / "Secret Love" (contains elements of "Sprung") / "Makin' It Last All Night (What It Do)" (dancers interlude)

Act IV

16. "It's Like That" (contains elements of "Sucker M.C.'s" and "Here We Go" by Run-DMC)
17. "Don't Forget About Us"
18. "We Belong Together" (contains elements of "Mimi's Late Night Valentine's Mix")
19. "I Want to Know What Love Is" (with extended outro)
October 3 – 14, 2025, October 28 – November 2, 2025

"The Era of Mi" (intro, contains elements of "Vision of Love," "Emotions," "Hero," "All I Want for Christmas Is You," "Always Be My Baby," "My All," "Heartbreaker," "Lead the Way," "Through the Rain," "We Belong Together," "Touch My Body," "Obsessed," "When Christmas Comes," "It's a Wrap," "GTFO" and "Here for It All")

Act I

1. "Type Dangerous"
2. "Emotions"
3. "Touch My Body"
4. "Can't Let Go"
5. "Vision of Love"
6. "Dreamlover" (with extended outro)

"Dreamlover" (Def Club Mix) (video interlude)

Act II

7. "Hero"
8. "Without You" (with extended outro)
9. "Fantasy" (Bad Boy Fantasy)
10. "Honey / Heartbreaker" (mashup)
11. "I'm That Chick"
12. "My All"
13. "Always Be My Baby"

"Loverboy" / "Don't Stop (Funkin' 4 Jamaica)" / "Didn't Mean to Turn You On" / "Last Night a DJ Saved My Life" / "Boy (I Need You)" / "Sunflowers for Alfred Roy" (dancers interlude)

Act III

14. "#Beautiful" (with Daniel Moore II)
15. "Play This Song" (with Daniel Moore II)
16. "In Your Feelings"
17. "Sugar Sweet"
18. "I Know What You Want"
19. "Say Somethin'"
20. "Your Girl"
21. "Shake It Off" (contains elements of "Don't" by Bryson Tiller)

"So Lonely (One & Only Part II)" (dancers interlude)
"I'll Be Lovin' U Long Time" (band introductions)

Act IV

22. "Obsessed"
23. "It's Like That" (contains elements of "Sucker M.C.'s" and "Here We Go" by Run-DMC)
24. "Don't Forget About Us"
25. "We Belong Together" (contains elements of "Mimi's Late Night Valentine's Mix")
26. "Fly Like a Bird" (followed by "Here for It All" outro)

Notes

- "Don't Forget About Us" was not performed, while "All I Want for Christmas Is You" replaced "Fly Like a Bird" on the October 14, 2025 show.
October 17 – 25, 2025

"The Era of Mi" (intro, contains elements of "Vision of Love," "Emotions," "Hero," "All I Want for Christmas Is You," "Always Be My Baby," "My All," "Heartbreaker," "Lead the Way," "Through the Rain," "We Belong Together," "Touch My Body," "Obsessed," "When Christmas Comes," "It's a Wrap," "GTFO" and "Here for It All")

1. "Type Dangerous"
2. "Emotions"
3. "Touch My Body"
4. "Dreamlover" (with extended outro)
5. "Hero"
6. "Fantasy" (Bad Boy Fantasy)
7. "Honey / Heartbreaker" (mashup)
8. "My All"
9. "Always Be My Baby"
10. "Obsessed"
11. "In Your Feelings"
12. "Sugar Sweet"
13. "I Know What You Want"
14. "Say Somethin'"
15. "Shake It Off" (contains elements of "Don't" by Bryson Tiller)
16. "It's Like That" (contains elements of "Sucker M.C.'s" and "Here We Go" by Run-DMC)
17. "We Belong Together" (contains elements of "Mimi's Late Night Valentine's Mix," followed by remix outro)

Notes

- "All I Want for Christmas Is You" was performed as an encore in Sydney, Melbourne, Kobe and Yokohama.

=== Concert dates ===
List of 2024 concerts
Date (2024)	City	Country	Venue	Attendance	Revenue
September 15	Beijing	China	Workers' Stadium	—	—
September 16	Beijing	China	Workers' Stadium	—	—
September 20	São Paulo	Brazil	Allianz Parque	—	—
September 22 (Note: This show was part of Rock in Rio 2024.)	Rio de Janeiro	Brazil	Barra Olympic Park	—	—

List of 2025 concerts
Date (2025)	City	Country	Venue	Attendance	Revenue
May 10	Shenzhen	China	Shenzhen Sports Center Stadium	—	—
May 16	Shanghai	China	Hongkou Football Stadium	—	—
May 17	Shanghai	China	Hongkou Football Stadium	—	—
June 15 (Note: This show is set to be part of Summertime Ball 2025.)	London	England	Wembley Stadium	—	—
August 2 (Note: This show is set to be part of Brighton Pride 2025.)	Brighton	England	Preston Park	—	—
August 15 (Note: This show is set to be part of Heritage Live 2025.)	Norfolk	England	Sandringham House	—	—
September 13 (Note: This show is set to be part of The Town 2025.)	São Paulo	Brazil	Interlagos Circuit	—	—
September 20 (Note: This show is set to be part of iHeartRadio Music Festival 2025.)	Paradise	United States	T-Mobile Arena	—	—
October 4	Bogor (Note: Labeled as Jakarta in promotional material.)	Indonesia	Sentul International Convention Center	—	—
October 8	Singapore		Arena @ Expo	—	—
October 11	Pak Kret (Note: Labeled as Bangkok in promotional material.)	Thailand	Impact Challenger Hall	—	—
October 14	Pasay (Note: Labeled as Manila in promotional material.)	Philippines	SM Mall of Asia Arena	—	—
October 17 (Note: This show is set to be part of Fridayz Live 2025.)	Brisbane	Australia	Brisbane Showgrounds	—	—
October 18	Sydney	Australia	Engie Stadium	—	—
October 24	Perth	Australia	Langley Park	—	—
October 25	Melbourne	Australia	Marvel Stadium	—	—
October 28	Kobe	Japan	GLION Arena Kobe	—	—
November 1	Yokohama	Japan	K-Arena Yokohama	—	—
November 2	Yokohama	Japan	K-Arena Yokohama	—	—
