= Amazônia Live =

Brazilian music and environmental awareness project

Amazônia Live Amazônia Para Sempre
- Genre: Pop
- Dates: September 17 and 20, 2025
- Locations: Belém, Pará, Brazil
- Years active: 2025
- Founders: Roberto Medina
- Website: https://amazonialive.com.br/

Amazônia Live (also known as Amazônia Para Sempre) is a Brazilian music and environmental awareness project created by Roberto Medina, founder of the festivals Rock in Rio and The Town, in partnership with the company Vale. The first edition took place on two dates, September 17 and 20, 2024. The first day featured a floating stage built on the Guamá River in Belém, Pará, and the second day was held at the Mangueirão Stadium. The event included an international performance by Mariah Carey and national acts by Pará-based artists such as Joelma, Gaby Amarantos, Zaynara, and Dona Onete. It was broadcast by TV Globo, Multishow, and Globoplay.

The hosts were Guilherme Guedes and Laura Vicente, while Kenya Sade and Milton Cunha contributed reflections on the importance of preserving the Amazon rainforest.

== History ==
The project was announced in October 2024 under the initial name Amazônia Para Sempre, but aired as Amazônia Live – Hoje e Sempre. The floating stage, shaped like a Victoria amazonica, a native aquatic plant of the Amazon region, was installed on the Guamá River.

During the event's promotion, false claims circulated online suggesting that R$30 million in public funds were used to build the stage via the Ministry of Culture. However, according to AFP, the project was funded exclusively with private resources and did not receive public investment.

== Line-up ==
=== Day 1 ===
- Mariah Carey
- Joelma
- Gaby Amarantos
- Zaynara
- Dona Onete

=== Day 2 ===
The second day of Amazônia Live took place on September 20 at the Mangueirão Stadium.

- Viviane Batidão
- Ivete Sangalo
