= The Town (festival) =

Brazilian Music festival

- Genre: Various
- Location: The Town
- Years active: 2023 –present
- Founders: Roberto Medina
- Website: thetown.com.br/pt/

The Town is a music festival created by Brazilian entrepreneur Roberto Medina — the same founder of Rock in Rio — and held for the first time in 2023. It is recognized as one of the largest music festivals in Brazil. The festival takes place at the Autódromo de Interlagos in São Paulo, the same venue that hosts Lollapalooza and Primavera Sound.

With the creation of The Town, it was announced that Rock in Rio X, originally scheduled for 2023 at the Parque Olímpico do Rio de Janeiro, would be postponed to 2024. From then on, editions of Rock in Rio will take place in even-numbered years alongside Rock in Rio Lisboa, while The Town will be held in São Paulo during odd-numbered years. This scheduling avoids having both Brazilian festivals occur in the same year.

== History ==
=== First edition (2023) ===
The first edition of The Town was held at the Autódromo de Interlagos in São Paulo from September 2 to 10, 2023, attracting half a million attendees over five days of festival. With sold-out tickets and more than 235 hours of music, the event featured a wide range of performances by national and international artists, including headliner Bruno Mars, who delivered two sold-out shows.

The event's infrastructure was supported by partnerships with transportation companies and public agencies, which facilitated access to the venue. The scenography incorporated elements of São Paulo's culture and architecture, with stages such as São Paulo Square and Factory, and cosmopolitan references illustrated by the buildings of the Skyline stage.

Economically, the festival generated R$ 1.9 billion and created over 23,000 direct and indirect jobs. The event also promoted sustainability initiatives, such as a reusable cup program and partnerships with recycling and reforestation companies.

Brands like Heineken, Vivo, and iFood launched campaigns throughout the event, while the official merchandise store sold over 100,000 items, with 93% of products sold out.

In addition to electronic music featured at the New Dance Order stage, the festival offered a diverse lineup including jazz, R&B, and urban music. Brazilian artists such as Luísa Sonza, Pabllo Vittar, Iza, and Gloria Groove performed on the main stages. The event also featured shows by Demi Lovato, Foo Fighters, Post Malone, Iggy Azalea, Bebe Rexha, Maroon 5, Kim Petras, Marina Sena, Jão, Grag Queen, among others. Bruno Mars was the most prominent headliner, closing the inaugural edition of the festival, whose next edition is scheduled for 2025.

=== Second edition (2025) ===
Following the conclusion of its first edition in 2023, the second edition of the festival was confirmed for September 2025. The event is scheduled to take place from September 6 to 14, 2025.

== Editions ==
No.	Edition	Attendance	Location	Ref.
1	The Town 2023	500,000 people	Autódromo de Interlagos, São Paulo	
2	The Town 2025	—	Autódromo de Interlagos, São Paulo	
