= Breakdown (Mariah Carey song) =

1998 single by Mariah Carey

Single by Mariah Carey featuring Bone Thugs-n-Harmony

from the album Butterfly
- A-side: "My All"
- Released: January 1998
- Recorded: 1997
- Studio: The Hit Factory; Daddy's House (New York City)
- Genre: R&B; hip hop; hip hop soul
- Length: 4:44 (album); 4:15 (single)
- Label: Columbia
- Composers: Mariah Carey; Steven Jordan
- Lyricists: Mariah Carey; Anthony Henderson; Charles Scruggs
- Producers: Mariah Carey; Stevie J; Sean "Puffy" Combs

Mariah Carey singles chronology
"Butterfly" (1997)	"Breakdown" (1998)	"The Roof (Back in Time)" (1998)

Bone Thugs-n-Harmony singles chronology
"If I Could Teach the World" (1997)	"Breakdown" (1998)	"Ghetto Cowboy" (1999)

Music video
- "Breakdown" on YouTube

"Breakdown" is a song recorded by American singer Mariah Carey for her sixth studio album, Butterfly (1997). In the lyrics, she describes the aftermath of a partner ending their love for the other and the trouble of hiding the pain it caused. The track features rapping by Krayzie Bone and Wish Bone, members of the group Bone Thugs-n-Harmony. Before they wrote and performed their raps, Carey composed the music with Stevie J and penned her lyrics. The latter pair produced "Breakdown" with Sean "Puffy" Combs. An R&B, hip hop, and hip hop soul song, "Breakdown" features keyboards, synthesized drums, and background vocals prominently. Columbia Records released it to American rhythmic contemporary radio stations in January 1998 as the third single from Butterfly.

Critics judged "Breakdown" in relation to Carey's previous work and considered the collaboration with Bone-Thugs-n-Harmony successful. Some perceived it to be about the recent separation from her husband Tommy Mottola, which she denied. Carey publicly criticized Columbia for a perceived longstanding anti-R&B bias against her music after it did not release the song to retail outlets in the United States. "Breakdown" was thus initially ineligible to appear on the Billboard Hot 100 chart. It was later issued as a double A-side with "My All" and reached number four on Hot R&B Singles. "Breakdown" experienced consistent airplay on American urban contemporary radio stations and it became Carey's longest-running title on Hot R&B Airplay until 2005. Elsewhere, "Breakdown" peaked at number four in New Zealand and number thirty-eight in Australia.

Carey directed the music video with previous collaborator Diane Martel. It presents her in various roles at a casino such as a showgirl and cabaret performer; the latter received comparisons to Liza Minnelli. "Breakdown" received heavy rotation on the television channels BET and MTV and was issued as a video single. Clips accompanied Carey's live performances of the song during the 1998 Butterfly World Tour. Retrospectively, "Breakdown" is regarded as a turning point in Carey's musical direction toward hip hop and as one of the best songs of her career.

== Background ==
In the early 1990s, American singer Mariah Carey was known for middle of the road music. (Note: According to Norman Abjorensen, "middle of the road" is a radio format focusing on songs that are "generally strongly melodic and often features vocal harmony technique and light orchestral arrangements".) Stronger contemporary R&B influences became apparent in her music with "Dreamlover", a song from her 1993 album Music Box. Carey's fifth album, Daydream (1995), contained elements of hip hop. After receiving the best critical reviews of her career up to that point and separating from her husband Tommy Mottola, (Note: Their separation occurred in late 1996, and was disclosed publicly on May 30, 1997.) the head of her record label Columbia, Carey felt confident to incorporate hip hop overtly in her follow-up album Butterfly (1997).

Experiencing creative freedom, Carey recorded Butterfly from November 1996 to August 1997. During this time, she became enamored with "Notorious Thugs" by The Notorious B.I.G. and Bone Thugs-n-Harmony, a song produced by Stevie J and Sean "Puffy" Combs. Carey expressed interest in collaborating with Bone Thugs-n-Harmony to Stevie J, and they began studying the rap group's discography. He and Combs had already worked with Carey on another Butterfly track, "Honey". In 1995, Combs had produced the hip hop remix of Carey's song "Fantasy" featuring Wu-Tang Clan rapper Ol' Dirty Bastard.

== Composition ==
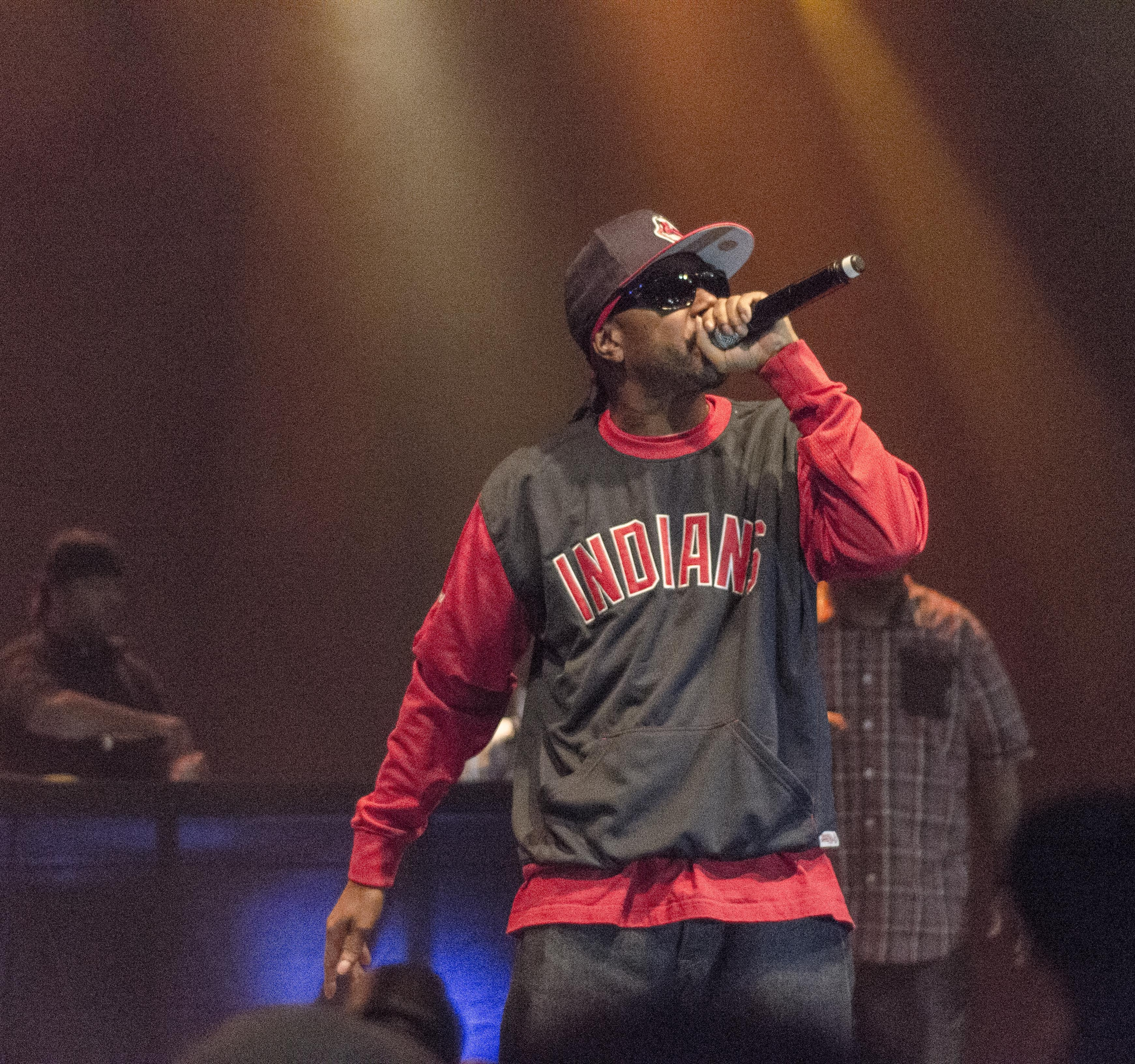
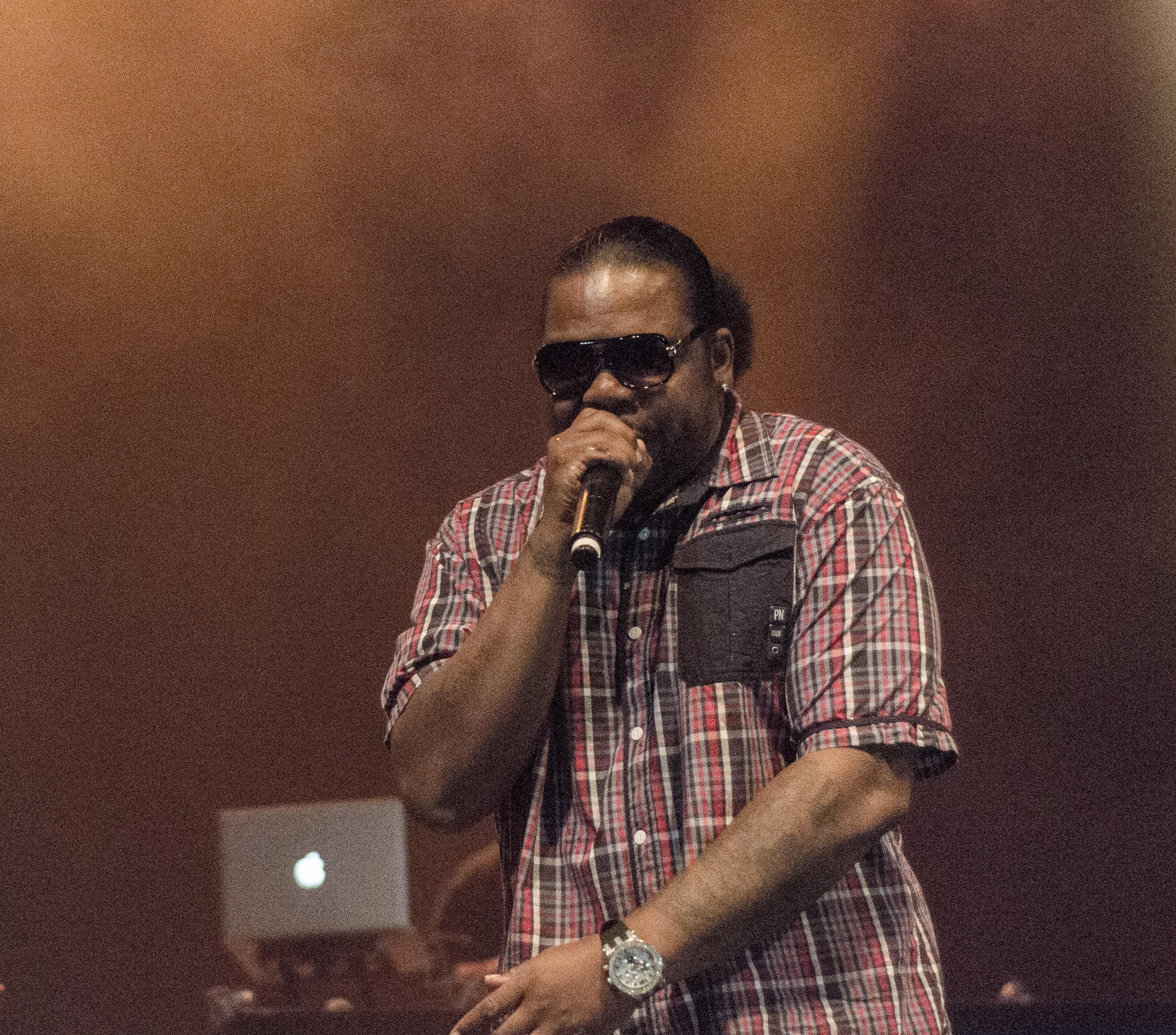
"Breakdown" features rapping by two members of the group Bone-Thugs-n-Harmony, Krayzie Bone (left) and Wish Bone.

"Breakdown"
A sample of the last chorus, featuring the song's instrumentation and vocal arrangement

Situated among ballads (e.g. "Butterfly") and uptempo songs ("Honey"), "Breakdown" occupies a musical middle ground on Butterfly. It is an R&B, hip hop, and hip hop soul song driven by a slow groove. The album version lasts four minutes and forty-four seconds and the single is four minutes and fifteen seconds long. Carey wrote her lyrics after the composing with Stevie J, who played keyboards and programmed additional keyboard and drum sounds electronically. She recorded her vocals before Bone-Thugs-n-Harmony members Krayzie Bone and Wish Bone did: "I wanted to do a song in their style, so that when they came into the studio to hear it, they would know immediately that I had been totally influenced by them." After Bone-Thugs-n-Harmony's manager informed them that Carey was interested in collaborating, the group was reluctant as they did not comprehend her level of fame.

Columbia chartered a plane to Cleveland, Ohio, to bring the group members to record in New York City. Upon their arrival, Krayzie Bone and Wish Bone were given cannabis which they passed out from after becoming intoxicated. Awakened by their manager, the group members were receptive to "Breakdown" because it sounded similar to their previous work. According to Wish Bone, "She had a blueprint laid out for us, and then me and Krayzie started coming up with little things to add to the hook. It really wasn't nothing for us to do our verses because that's what we do." Layzie Bone initially stayed back, but joined the session at Carey's request after the record label sent a second plane. Carey, Stevie J, and Combs produced "Breakdown"; Dana Jon Chappelle and Ian Dalsemer conducted engineering at The Hit Factory and Daddy's House (Note: Daddy's House was a recording studio owned by Sean Combs) studios. Tony Maserati managed the mixing at The Hit Factory and Herb Powers Jr. mastered it at Powers House of Sound in New York. She was initially apprehensive about the outcome: "After I did it, I was like 'Wow, this sounds really different for me. What did I just do?' And I was like, 'Did I do wrong?'"

"Breakdown" concerns concealing heartbreak after a romantic relationship ended due to rejection. Some of Carey's lyrics, such as "Well I guess I'm trying to be nonchalant about it / And I'm going to extremes to prove I'm fine without you", are directed at the former partner. Others posit questions about how to move on: "So what do you do when / Somebody you're so devoted to / Suddenly just stops loving you?" The lyrics have a dark tone, and chirping birds in the background elicit an optimistic aura. Some critics thought the song detailed the end of Carey's marriage with Mottola. (Note: Such as J. D. Considine of The Baltimore Sun, Michael Corcoran of the Austin American-Statesman, and David Thigpen of Time) Others felt the perceived references were not as clear. Carey told The Boston Globe it is a representation of her admiration for Bone-Thugs-n-Harmony's rapping style.

The song structure of "Breakdown" contains two verses and a chorus sung by Carey, two raps by Wish Bone, and two raps by Krayzie Bone. Bone Thugs-n-Harmony harmonize their rapping in staccato-saturated couplets. Influenced by reggae and doo-wop, they rap in a fast-paced aggressive manner. Carey speeds up her vocals to match them, singing in double-time. New York Times writer Jon Pareles perceived this delivery as showcasing she is torn between feeling despair and detachment. Carey incorporates melisma in her vocals and produces vamps. At times half-whispering, she adopts a restrained delivery until belting near the end of the song to express her true emotional state. Departing from her practice of having a male singer like Trey Lorenz add background vocals in a low register that complement the lead, Carey provides them herself on "Breakdown". They are featured prominently throughout the track and, according to Grey Cavitt of the Waco Tribune-Herald, "threaten to bring about the psychological break promised by the title".

== Release ==
"Breakdown" is the sixth track on Butterfly, which Sony Music issued on September 10, 1997. Upon the album's release, American newspaper critics deemed "Breakdown" a potentially successful single. (Note: Such as those from USA Today, The Philadelphia Inquirer, and the Springfield News-Leader) R&B radio stations in the country began playing it in late 1997 amid a lukewarm response to the album's second single, "Butterfly". (Note: "Butterfly" was released as the second single from Butterfly in 1997. "Breakdown" debuted on the Billboard Hot R&B Airplay chart dated October 18, 1997, the same week as "Butterfly". The latter peaked at number twenty-seven and became Carey's third-lowest charting song on the chart at the time. According to the New York Daily News, "Butterfly" received poor audience feedback. A radio programmer told Billboard that they added "Breakdown" to their playlist instead of "Butterfly" to avoid playing multiple slow songs in a row.) After "Breakdown" received over 600 spins without promotion, Columbia released the song to American rhythmic contemporary radio stations in January 1998. It was the third single from Butterfly, following "Honey" and "Butterfly".

After "Breakdown" failed to garner crossover success on contemporary hit radio, Columbia did not release it for sale in the United States. At the time, Billboard Hot 100 chart rules stipulated that songs required retail releases to appear and that airplay from R&B radio stations was not a factor. During an interview in late 1998, Carey said Columbia had a peculiar pattern of not releasing her heavily R&B material as commercial singles since her 1990 debut: "I'll always be upset 'Breakdown' never got its shot."

Columbia released "Breakdown" in the United States as a double A-side with the album's fifth single, "My All", on April 21, 1998. The songs were issued together in many formats: 7-inch vinyl, 12-inch vinyl, cassette, maxi cassette, CD, and maxi CD. (Note: For comparison, when "Breakdown" debuted on the Hot R&B Singles chart dated May 9, 1998, none of the other ninety-nine songs on the chart had as many formats available.) In Japan, "Breakdown" is the B-side to the "My All" mini CD single released on May 30, 1998. It was released independently of "My All" in Oceania. Some formats include a remix of "Breakdown" with additional rapping by Bone Thugs-n-Harmony. This version, with contributions from Layzie Bone, also appears on the group's 1998 compilation album, The Collection. "Breakdown" is present on Carey's 2003 remix album, The Remixes, in its original form. Columbia and Legacy Recordings released a digital extended play with the three versions of the song as part of the MC30 campaign marking three decades of Carey's career on August 28, 2020.

== Critical reception ==
Critics evaluated the effectiveness of "Breakdown" as a departure from Carey's previous work. Billy Tyus described it as innovative in the Herald & Review, and Daily Herald writer Mark Guarino considered the lyrics surprisingly serious. Paul Willistein of The Morning Call and author Chris Nickson believed "Breakdown" demonstrated artistic freedom successfully. Carey's restrained vocals made the song as high-quality as her traditional ballads according to Vulture's Lindsey Weber. In contrast, several critics thought the composition lacked cohesiveness. (Note: Such as Gary Graff of the San Francisco Chronicle, Chuck Campbell of the Knoxville News Sentinel, and Dave Ferman of the Fort Worth Star-Telegram) Writing in the Milwaukee Journal Sentinel, Dave Tianen said Carey's "vocals get smothered beneath a rancid glop of synths, samples, raps and choruses". Nicole M. Campbell of The Santa Clarita Valley Signal credited these sentiments to the number of producers, which she considered excessive.

The song received comparisons to others in its genre. According to Billboard, "Breakdown" eclipses them because "the rhymes are tightly sewn into the track's primary vocal arrangement and are crucial to the evolution of the song's lyric". Conversely, Dave Ferman of the Fort Worth Star-Telegram felt it contributed to a pattern of nondescript R&B collaborations in the mid-1990s. (Note: Ferman felt that unlike R&B collaborations before the 1990s, in which "individual styles and good material blended to produce something that neither artist could have managed alone," the new "sound is an often unsatisfying fusion of slow to medium beats, with traces of '70s funk and a more streetwise sensibility than much ultra-successful '80s urban music had".) Critics contrasted "Breakdown" with "Tha Crossroads". (Note: Such as Jon O'Brien and Christine Werthman of Billboard) According to Eric Henderson of Slant Magazine, the hi-hats and bassline are repetitive to the point of laziness. For Philadelphia Daily News writer Jonathan Takiff, its hip hop aspects acted as "freshening the soul-diva formula". Others likened "Breakdown" to the music of En Vogue, Mary J. Blige, and Janet Jackson.

Critics praised the pairing of Carey and Bone Thugs-n-Harmony. (Note: Such as David Browne of Entertainment Weekly, Thor Christensen of The Dallas Morning News, Owen Myers of Pitchfork, Kelefa Sanneh of The New York Times, Troy L. Smith of Cleveland.com, and Vincent Stephens in Popular Music and Society) Slant Magazine's Sal Cinquemani thought Carey wholly embraced her collaborators' appearance on the track. According to Sonia Murray of The Atlanta Journal-Constitution, she adopted their cadence without losing authenticity. For New York Daily News writer Jim Farber, "instead of just co-opting their sound, her sweet tones give Bone Thugs' sound a new fluidity." In contrast, The Scotsman's Sarah Dempster considered the collaboration confounding. Richard Harrington of The Washington Post thought Bone Thugs-n-Harmony overshadowed Carey; J. D. Considine of The Baltimore Sun said she adopted their style so effectively that the group's presence was almost unnecessary.

== Commercial performance ==
"Breakdown" experienced success on American urban contemporary radio stations. It reached number nine on the airplay chart for that format published by Radio & Records in March 1998. On the comparative Billboard Hot R&B Airplay chart, "Breakdown" peaked at number thirteen. It surpassed "One Sweet Day" (1995) to become Carey's longest-running song on the list (thirty weeks), a position it held until "We Belong Together" in 2005. "Breakdown" reached number eighteen on Rhythmic Top 40, her lowest peak on that chart at the time. Billboard originally listed Bone Thugs-n-Harmony as a featured artist, but credits Krayzie Bone and Wish Bone individually on their website.

After the double A-side release with "My All", "Breakdown" debuted and peaked at number four on the Hot R&B Singles chart dated May 9, 1998. Sales of 25,000 units at R&B music stores accounted for over ninety percent of its ranking and R&B airplay contributed less than ten percent. As the song's radio audience (6.5 million) was higher than that of "My All" (5.2 million), the single charted as "Breakdown"/"My All". (Note: The release was credited to "My All"/"Breakdown" by the next week) "Breakdown" did not appear alongside "My All" on the Hot 100 because it was not within the top seventy-five of Hot 100 Airplay at the time, having peaked at number fifty-three in March 1998. In 2022, the Recording Industry Association of America awarded "Breakdown" a Gold certification, which denotes 500,000 equivalent units.

The song's performance varied in other countries. "Breakdown" peaked at number four on the New Zealand singles chart, outperforming "Butterfly". (Note: "Butterfly" peaked at number fifteen) It continued a pattern of success for Bone Thugs-n-Harmony in the country; four of their last five singles had reached the top five. The Recording Industry Association of New Zealand certified it gold, indicating shipments of 5,000 units. In Australia, "Breakdown" reached number thirty-eight. Although it was not officially released there, (Note: "The Roof (Back in Time)" was chosen as the third single from Butterfly in the United Kingdom in lieu of "Breakdown", but its release was ultimately cancelled. "My All" was issued independently of "Breakdown".) the double A-side single "My All"/"Breakdown" appeared for one week on the UK Singles Chart at number ninety-eight.

== Music video ==
Carey and Diane Martel directed the music video for "Breakdown". Martel had previously directed videos for Carey's singles "Dreamlover" (1993) and "All I Want for Christmas Is You" (1994). "Breakdown" showcases Carey in various roles at a Las Vegas casino. Members of Bone Thugs-n-Harmony appear, as do producer Jermaine Dupri and rapper Redman as a magician. Visuals include Carey's butterfly tattoo and her jumping into poker chips that cover a bed. In a cabaret scene, Carey wears a black sequin halter top on a bentwood chair. Writers for The New York Times and Ottawa Citizen felt this paid homage to Liza Minnelli as Sally Bowles in Cabaret (1972). In the academic journal Gender & Society, Rana A. Emerson cited the camera's focus on Carey's showgirl outfit in arguing that social standards regarding the attractiveness of female R&B singers are implied.

The "Breakdown" music video was issued in late 1997. It peaked within the top five on weekly airplay charts for MTV and BET television channels as measured by Broadcast Data Systems. Columbia Music Video released "Breakdown" as a video single on VHS with "My All" on April 21, 1998. It was later included on Carey's 1999 video album Around the World. The video was shown during Carey's live performances of "Breakdown" on the Butterfly World Tour so Bone Thugs-n-Harmony could appear by proxy. Carey again performed with a chair while singing the song on the first date of her 2006 concert tour The Adventures of Mimi.

== Legacy ==
Critics judge "Breakdown" as a turning point in Carey's musical direction toward hip hop. (Note: Such as writers for NPR, Slant Magazine, and Vibe) "Breakdown" marked the first time she collaborated with rap artists on a song in its original form; she had previously employed them on remixes to her songs "Fantasy" (1995), "Always Be My Baby" (1996), and "Honey" (1997). Bianca Betancourt gauged it as a "game-changing collaboration" in Harper's Bazaar, and Vibe's Julianne Shepherd said Carey "transcend[ed] genre" with the song. According to journalist Elaine Welteroth, "Breakdown" compelled African Americans to begin thinking of Carey as Black. Scholar Alexander Ghedi Weheliye viewed its fusion of singing and rapping as a precursor to the popularity of this practice in hip hop music after 2010. In his 2023 book Why Mariah Carey Matters, Andrew Chan argued that Carey advanced the style of R&B vocalists by adopting the flow of rappers.

Retrospectively, Carey and her fans consider "Breakdown" one of the best songs in her catalog. It has received a similar reception from critics. (Note: Such as those from Billboard, Cleveland.com, and Vulture) Rich Juzwiak of Slant Magazine hailed "Breakdown" as Carey's best track in 2003, and Alex Macpherson of The Guardian described it as "perhaps Carey's finest song" in 2020. Writers for BET, Gold Derby, and the Honolulu Star-Advertiser considered "Breakdown" one of her best tracks that did not reach number one on the Hot 100. In 2007, Carey and Bone-Thugs-n-Harmony collaborated again for the group's song "Lil' L.O.V.E.".

Retrospective rankings of "Breakdown"
Publication	List	Year	Rank	Ref.
Billboard	100 Greatest Mariah Carey Songs	2020	18	
Billboard	Butterfly Tracklist Ranked	2022	5	
Billboard	Mariah Carey's 56 Best Collaborations with Rappers	2019	6	
Cleveland.com	All 76 Mariah Carey Singles Ranked	2020	11	
Complex	Stevie J's 10 Greatest Music Contributions	2014	Placed	
Dazed	Mariah Carey's 10 Greatest Hip Hop Collaborations	2015	Placed	
Revolt	Stevie J's 11 Most Classic Beats	2019	3	
Vibe	Butterfly Tracklist Ranked	2017	2	
Vulture	Mariah Carey's 25 Best Singles	2014	11	

== Credits and personnel ==
- Mariah Carey – background vocals, composer, lyrics, producer, vocals
- Dana Jon Chappelle – engineering
- Sean "Puffy" Combs – producer
- Ian Dalsemer – assistant engineering
- Anthony Henderson – background vocals, lyrics, vocals
- Steven Jordan – composer, keyboards, keyboard and drum programming, producer
- Tony Maserati – mixing
- Herb Powers Jr. – mastering
- Charles Scruggs – background vocals, lyrics, vocals

== Charts ==
1997–1998 weekly chart performance
Chart (Publisher)	Peak position
Australia Singles (ARIA)	38
New Zealand Singles (RIANZ)	4
UK Singles (OCC) Import-only single; with "My All"	98
US Hot 100 Airplay (Billboard)	53
US Hot R&B Singles (Billboard) with "My All"	4
US Hot R&B Airplay (Billboard)	13
US Crossover (Billboard)	13
US Rhythmic Top 40 (Billboard)	18
US CHR/Rhythmic (Radio & Records)	13
US Urban (Radio & Records)	9

1998 US year-end chart performance
Chart (Publisher)	Position
Hot R&B Singles (Billboard) with "My All"	24
Rhythmic Top 40 (Billboard)	71
CHR/Rhythmic (Radio & Records)	68
Urban (Radio & Records)	71

== Certifications ==
Region	Certification	Certified units/sales
New Zealand (RMNZ)	Gold	15,000^{‡}
United States (RIAA)	Gold	500,000^{‡}
^{‡} Sales+streaming figures based on certification alone.
