= Whenever You Call (Mariah Carey song) =

1997 song by Mariah Carey

- Brian McKnight duet cover

Song by Mariah Carey

from the album Butterfly
- Recorded: 1997
- Studio: Crave (New York): WallyWorld (California); The Hit Factory (New York City)
- Genre: Pop
- Length: 4:21
- Label: Columbia
- Composers: Mariah Carey; Walter Afanasieff
- Lyricist: Mariah Carey
- Producers: Mariah Carey; Walter Afanasieff

Music video
- "Whenever You Call" on YouTube

"Whenever You Call" is a song recorded by American singer-songwriter Mariah Carey for her sixth studio album, Butterfly (1997). Carey wrote the lyrics to the pop ballad herself, and she produced and composed the song with her longtime collaborator Walter Afanasieff. Critics interpreted the track as referring to either a romance, a breakup, or a friendship. Its piano-driven arrangement features keyboards, synthesizers, programmed drums, while Carey sings using a breathy style and a wide vocal range.

After its release on Butterfly, "Whenever You Call" received mixed reviews from music critics. Some considered it one of the album's best songs or praised Carey's vocal performance, while others thought it failed to demonstrate artistic growth or was overproduced. Carey performed the song during the 1998 Butterfly World Tour to a positive critical reception. A music video featuring live footage from the tour's Honolulu date was released following the concert. Carey later rerecorded the track as a duet with American singer Brian McKnight for her compilation album #1's (1998), and the pair performed it live at Spy Bar in New York City.

== Background and release ==
Columbia Records released American singer-songwriter Mariah Carey's sixth studio album, Butterfly, on September 10, 1997. Working with rappers such as Sean Combs and Missy Elliott while recording it earlier that year, Carey moved her music closer to hip-hop from the middle of the road, pop ballads she had become known for since her 1990 debut Mariah Carey. Nonetheless, she also resumed her partnership with longtime adult contemporary collaborator Walter Afanasieff for songs such as "Butterfly", "My All", and "Whenever You Call". The latter appears as the album's ninth track.

A duet version of "Whenever You Call" with American singer Brian McKnight was recorded for Carey's 1998 compilation album #1's with the intention that it would be released as a single. Carey described the original as one of the best songs on Butterfly and thought McKnight's vocals enhanced its beauty. After the release never materialized, Billboard editor Gary Trust named "Whenever You Call" one of Carey's top five songs that should have been issued as a single due to its commercial viability. The duet, which became a fan favorite following its inclusion on #1's, was later added as a bonus track on the twenty-fifth anniversary reissue of Butterfly in 2022.

== Composition and production ==
"Whenever You Call"
The composition of "Whenever You Call" includes keyboards, synthesizers, programming, and a key change.

"Whenever You Call" is a pop ballad. Its music, composed by Carey and Afanasieff, is dominated by the piano and includes a classical-sounding piano solo. While "Whenever You Call" recalls the pair's previous ballads, new R&B elements—a toned-down arrangement and the prominence of Carey's voice in the mix—are present due to the influence of the album's hip-hop collaborators. "Whenever You Call" has a slow tempo and builds toward a climax. Devices such as a key change and brief silence are incorporated. The composition was compared to the music of American singer Whitney Houston and Carey's 1993 song "Hero". In The Washington Post, Richard Harrington suggested that "Whenever You Call" is what the 1960 song "Love Hurts" would sound like if it was the work of composer Andrew Lloyd Webber.

Written by Carey, the lyrics are structured into two verses, a bridge, and a chorus that repeats four times. Critics have interpreted the lyrics in different ways. New York Observer contributor Jonathan Bernstein and Los Angeles Times writer Natalie Nichols considered it a song about devotion. In contrast, Harrington thought it referred to the dissolution of a romance. David Browne of Entertainment Weekly viewed "Whenever You Call" as a platonic song in which the narrator tells a friend that they are not alone, and Houston Chronicle writer Joy R. Sewing described it as one about "understanding and support". The lyrics include statements such as "Love wandered inside / Stronger than you, stronger than I" and "We cannot turn back / We can only turn into one". Carey sings them with a breathy style of delivery using an expansive vocal range. The song's background vocals are also provided by her, and additional contributions are credited to Clarence.

Afanasieff played the song's keyboards and provided its synthesizers and programming. Dan Shea added additional keyboards, created the sound design and computer programming, and programmed the drums and rhythm. With assistance from Mike Scott, Dana Jon Chappelle recorded "Whenever You Call" in New York at Crave Studios and The Hit Factory, and in California at WallyWorld. It was mixed by Mick Guzauski at Crave and mastered by Bob Ludwig at Gateway in Portland, Maine.

== Critical reception ==
"Whenever You Call" garnered mixed reviews from music critics upon the release of Butterfly. Several considered the song one of the album's highlights. Others felt it was nondescript or predictable, given Carey's discography. Carey's vocal performance was a topic of commentary; some praised it as impressive or mature, while others deemed it excessive. Several writers considered the composition overproduced or incompatible with the album's hip-hop tracks.

Critics remained divided on the quality of the McKnight duet. Some felt the track devolved into a competition between the two singers and others thought the result was effective. In the academic journal Popular Music and Society, Vincent Stephens said the collaboration "does not detract from nor enhance the song, though they are an appealing pair". AllMusic's Stephen Thomas Erlewine and The Seattle Times writer Patrick MacDonald considered the duet unremarkable. For Kevin Howard of The Chronicle, it was "beautiful and will break your heart".

"Whenever You Call" also received retrospective reviews. In his 2023 book Why Mariah Carey Matters, author Andrew Chan thought it was overshadowed by the hip-hop tracks on Butterfly as they showcased Carey's voice in new ways. Billboard's Jon O'Brien named "Whenever You Call" the worst of twelve tracks on Butterfly for not showing artistic growth, while Vibe writer Preezy Brown ranked it at number eight and thought it played a valuable balancing role between Carey's new hip-hop focus and the ballads she was known for. In 2019, the Gay Times considered "Whenever You Call" the twelfth-best song of Carey's career and deemed it "an underrated masterpiece". Jessica Sager of Parade included it on a 2020 list as among the one hundred best love songs of all time. The New York Times Magazine labeled "Whenever You Call" one of Carey's "five essential songs" in 2026.

== Live performances and video ==
Carey included "Whenever You Call" in the set list of the 1998 Butterfly World Tour. The live performances garnered a positive critical reception, particularly for the quality of her vocals. A music video featuring live footage of Carey's performance of the song at Aloha Stadium in Honolulu was released following the concert. It received regular rotation on the VH1 television channel in the United States and peaked within the top twenty on the station's weekly airplay chart published by Broadcast Data Systems. After Carey sang the duet with McKnight at Spy Bar in New York City, Columbia released the performance on the 1999 video album Around the World.

== Credits and personnel ==
Credits are adapted from the liner notes of Butterfly.

=== Recording ===
- Recorded at Crave Studios (New York), WallyWorld (California), The Hit Factory (New York City)
- Mixed at Crave Studios (New York)
- Mastered at Gateway Mastering (Portland, Maine)

=== Personnel ===
- Mariah Carey – lyricist, composer, producer, arranger, lead vocals, background vocals
- Walter Afanasieff – composer, producer, arranger, keyboards, synthesizers, programming
- Clarence – background vocals
- Dan Shea – additional keyboards, drum and rhythm programming, sound design and computer programming
- Dana Jon Chappelle – engineering
- Mike Scott – assistant engineering
- Mick Guzauski – mixing
- Bob Ludwig – mastering
