= The Roof (Back in Time) =

1998 single by Mariah Carey

Single by Mariah Carey

from the album Butterfly
- Released: March 16, 1998
- Recorded: 1996–1997
- Studio: Crave (New York); The Hit Factory (New York City); Compass Point (The Bahamas)
- Genre: R&B; hip hop; soul
- Length: 5:14
- Label: Columbia
- Composers: Mariah Carey; Jean Claude Oliver; Samuel Barnes; Cory Rooney; Albert Johnson; Kejuan Muchita
- Lyricist: Mariah Carey
- Producers: Mariah Carey; Poke and Tone

Mariah Carey singles chronology
"Breakdown" (1998)	"The Roof (Back in Time)" (1998)	"My All" (1998)

Music video
- "The Roof (Back in Time)" on YouTube

"The Roof (Back in Time)" is a song by the American singer-songwriter Mariah Carey, taken from her sixth album, Butterfly (1997). Columbia Records released it in Europe as the album's fourth single on March 16, 1998. The song was written and produced by Carey and Trackmasters, and is built around a sample from "Shook Ones (Part II)" (1995) by the hip hop duo Mobb Deep. The song's lyrics recount an intimate roof-top encounter between lovers, and how the memory affects the protagonist. The extended remix features a rap verse by Mobb Deep; both versions were praised by contemporary music critics.

In the music video, Carey is seen in a limousine recounting an encounter she shared on a rainy night. Past scenes of the event are shown, with Carey caressing her lover at a rooftop party. During the video's climax, Carey opens the limousine's sunroof and stands in the rain, trying to recapture the feeling. Carey performed the song live during her Butterfly World Tour in 1998. Due to the song's limited release, "The Roof" did not chart in most major music markets, with the exception of The Netherlands and the United Kingdom, where it peaked at numbers 63 and 87, respectively.

"The Roof" appeared on Carey's compilation album The Ballads (2009). In 2020, Carey revealed that the song was about her relationship with New York Yankees shortstop Derek Jeter, whom she first kissed on the roof of his apartment building.

On April 14, 2022, Carey released a re-recorded and re-imagined version of the song, titled "The Roof (When I Feel the Need)" for her course on MasterClass. The song features vocals from the R&B singer Brandy. The collaboration appears on the expanded edition of Butterfly for the album's 25th anniversary, released on September 16, 2022.

== Composition ==
"The Roof"
A sample of the last chorus and final bridge, featuring the song's strong vocal moments.

The song is a slow and sultry song, which blends hip-hop and contemporary R&B genres. It incorporates drum notes, including heavy beats and grooves. The song's second version features a rap version from Mobb Deep. The song samples the melody from "Shook Ones Part II" by Mobb Deep, incorporating it into chorus and bridge. As part of layering the song, background vocals are featured throughout the chorus and sections of the bridge. It is set in the signature common time, and is written in the key of B-flat minor. It features a basic chord progression of A♭-F♭_{1}. Carey's vocal range in the song spans from the low note of E♭_{3} to the high note of F♭_{5}; the piano and guitar pieces range from F♭_{3} to G♭_{5} as well. The song contains lyrics written by Carey, who produced the song's melody and chorus as well. Aside from assisting with its chord progression, Cory Rooney co-arranged and produced the track as well. Author Chris Nickson felt the song was extremely important for Carey's musical transition, writing "Lyrically, this was some of her best work ever, the melody slinky and overtly sexy, confirmation – as if any was needed at this point! – that this was the new Mariah."

Critics categorized "The Roof" as a R&B, hip hop, and soul song.

According to Grey Cavitt of the Waco Tribune-Herald, the "background vocals, like her memories, crash into the forefront, adamantly rolling over Carey's lead melody. Her voice bobs up and down, trying to stay on top of the waves but often plunging below."

The song and Carey's vocal performance received comparisons to those of American singers Janet Jackson, Minnie Riperton, Deniece Williams, and the British band Portishead.

== Critical reception ==
"The Roof" received mixed reviews from music critics after the release of Butterfly. Some were critical of the composition: John Everson of The Star called it "a breathy bit of nothing" and Richard Drew of The Pink Paper perceived it as lacking structure and focus. According to The Washington Post writer Richard Harrington, the song is "deeper on mood than melody". Others favored "The Roof" in comparison to different tracks on Butterfly. Some suggested it was a highlight on the record, or even the best song. Steve Jones of USA Today considered it one of the album's more intriguing inclusions.

"The Roof" was acclaimed by contemporary music critics for its choice of vocal work, instrumentation, and lyrics. David Browne from Entertainment Weekly praised the song as well as Carey's choice of vocals, writing, "Carey is still a vocal grandstander capable of turning all into a six-syllable word. Yet for most of the album she keeps her notorious octave-climbing chops at bay. Showing some admirable restraint, she nestles herself into the downy-soft beats of 'The Roof'." A reviewer from Music Week commented, "Moving on from the more traditional-sounding ballad "Butterfly", she reverts to the R&B flavour of its more successful predecessor, "Honey", with a cut that greater reflects the edgier feel of her current album. Though not one of her most memorable singles, [...] its old-fashioned qualities further underlined by the presence of rap act Mobb Deep." Rich Juzwiak from Slant Magazine wrote "Little more than yearning, kissing, and remembering happens during the course of 'The Roof', a rough-enough R&B revision of Mobb Deep's 'The Shook Ones.' But lyrically Mariah the writer is vivid, sometimes shockingly clever (rhyming 'liberated' with 'Moet' is a stroke of genius)."

Many publications included "The Roof" in rankings of Carey's music. Gay Times ranked it at number 9 and Billboard placed the Mobb Deep mix at number 14 on lists of her best songs. Among her top singles, "The Roof" has been ranked at number 47 (Cleveland.com), number 15 (Vulture), and number 8 (The Guardian). Billboard, Dazed, and XXL considered it one of her best hip hop collaborations. According to Princess Gabbara in Essence and Everett Brothers in Billboard, "The Roof" is one of Carey's most underrated songs.

== Release and chart performance ==
"The Roof" was promoted as the fourth single from Butterfly in 1998. Columbia gave it little promotion and released it to European retail outlets only. The song was the most-added to European radio station playlists for a week in March 1998. Sony Music issued CD and maxi CD formats in Belgium on March 16. Following its release in the Netherlands, "The Roof" reached number 7 on the Tipparade, which ranks the songs not yet eligible to enter the Dutch Top 40. It also peaked at number 63 on the Single Top 100 and became Carey's lowest-charting single on that chart since "If It's Over" in 1992.

Aside from the Netherlands, "The Roof" entered music charts in the United Kingdom. Columbia first provided remixes to clubs for promotional use in late 1997. As the B-side to "Fly Away (Butterfly Reprise)", the Mobb Deep mix peaked at number 25 on the Record Mirror Club Chart published by Music Week. "The Roof" reached number 4 on the urban club chart as a standalone entry after the Mobb Deep mix was issued as part of a promotional disc that also featured "Underneath the Stars", "Breakdown" and "Babydoll". In early 1998, the single received a second promotional release in the UK. It peaked at number 30 on the club chart based on the David Morales mixes and reached number 9 on the urban club chart based on the Full Crew mixes. Although a commercial release scheduled for March 16, 1998, was canceled, "The Roof" peaked at number 87 on the UK singles chart due to import sales and remained within the top 100 for two weeks. It was more successful on the R&B charts, where it reached numbers 15 and 21 on the singles and albums rankings.

In the United States, "The Roof" began receiving unsolicited airplay from some rhythmic contemporary radio stations in October 1997. By late November, Columbia was preparing to issue it as the next commercial single from Butterfly. After the release never materialized, the Mobb Deep mix was later included on 1998 US maxi CDs of "My All", the album's fifth single. On August 28, 2020, Columbia and Legacy Recordings released a digital extended play with all the remixes of "The Roof" as part of the MC30 promotional campaign marking three decades of Carey's career.

== Music video ==
The video was directed by Carey and Diane Martel during the fall of 1997. The music video begins with Carey sitting alone in a limousine, recalling a night she shared some time previous. As scenes of Carey reminiscing in the limo are shown, clips of her dressing in an old apartment are presented. Eventually, Carey joins a rooftop party one night, where she begins dancing and caressing her lover. As the passion between them grown, rain begins to fall, showering everyone atop the edifice. As these scenes end, Carey in the present opens the sun-roof of the limo and stands into the rainy night, trying to recapture those magical moments she shared on that rainy roof-top encounter. The video ends with a wet Carey lying in the back of the limousine, sad and lonely.

The music video for "The Roof" garnered critical acclaim, and was ranked 18th on Slant's "100 Greatest Music Videos". Sal Ciquemani, from Slant, gave the video a positive review, complimenting Carey's choice to pair the sultry song with a "sophisticated tale of a sexy rooftop encounter". The video re-tells a story of Carey reminiscing a past love and a night they shared together on a rainy roof-top. The video's setting revolves around a dark limousine, a decrepit NYC apartment, and a rainy roof-top, where "Carey is featured at her most vulnerable, with runny mascara and drenched in the cold rainy night." In the conclusion of his review of the video, Ciquemani wrote: "When Carey rises through the limo's sunroof and relishes the warm November rain, she's not drunk on the bubbly but on the memory of past delights."

== Live performances ==
"The Roof" has been performed few times throughout Carey's career. The song was performed during her Butterfly World Tour in 1998. During the performances, live male and female dancers were present on stage, grooving and performing classic routines. Carey wore a short beige ensemble and performed light classical dances, alongside a male partner. The song was performed on select dates of Carey's 2014 The Elusive Chanteuse Show tour. Carey would later perform a snippet of it acapella during her set at Jimmy Kimmel Live! while promoting #1 To Infinity, later expressing to be happy at the fact the audience knew the lyrics to the song.

For the 2024–2025 Celebration of Mimi concert residency, Carey performed "The Roof" as a medley with other Butterfly songs while sitting on a couch.

== Formats and track listings ==
- 1998 CD single
1. "The Roof (Back In Time)" (Album Version) – 5:15
2. "The Roof (Back In Time)" (Full Crew Radio Edit/No Rap) – 3:50
- 1998 CD maxi single
1. "The Roof (Back In Time)" (Album Version) – 5:15
2. "The Roof (Back In Time)" (Radio Edit) – 3:58
3. "The Roof (Back In Time)" (Mobb Deep Extended Version) – 5:31
4. "The Roof (Back In Time)" (Full Crews' Club Mix) – 4:58
5. "The Roof (Back In Time)" (Full Crew Mix) – 4:58
- 1998 12-inch vinyl single

A1. "The Roof (Back In Time)" (Mobb Deep Extended Remix) – 5:31
A2. "The Roof (Back In Time)" (Full Crews' Club Mix) – 4:58
A3. "The Roof (Back In Time)" (Full Crew Club Mix) – 4:58
A4. "The Roof (Back In Time)" (Full Crew Radio Edit/No Rap) – 3:50

B1. "The Roof (Back In Time)" (Funky Club Mix) – 8:28
B2. "The Roof (Back In Time)" (After Hours Mix) – 9:13
B3. "The Roof (Back In Time)" (Bass Man Mix) – 8:14

- 2020 MC30 digital EP
1. "The Roof (Back In Time)" (Mobb Deep Extended Version) – 5:31
2. "The Roof (Back In Time)" (Mobb Deep Edit) – 4:23
3. "The Roof (Back In Time)" (Full Crew Radio Edit No Rap) – 3:50
4. "The Roof (Back In Time)" (Full Crew Club Mix) – 4:58
5. "The Roof (Back In Time)" (Full Crew Mix) – 4:58
6. "The Roof (Back In Time)" (Morales Radio Mix) – 3:59
7. "The Roof (Back In Time)" (Morales Funky Club Mix) – 8:28
8. "The Roof (Back in Time)" (Morales After Hours Mix) – 9:13
9. "The Roof (Back in Time)" (Morales Bass Man Mix) – 8:14

== Credits and personnel ==
Credits adapted from the liner notes of Butterfly.

=== Recording ===
- Recorded at Crave Studios (New York), The Hit Factory (New York City), Compass Point Studios (The Bahamas)
- Mixed at The Hit Factory (New York City)
- Mastered at Powers House of Sound (New York City)

=== Personnel ===
- Mariah Carey – lyricist, composer, producer, lead vocals, background vocals
- Jean Claude Oliver – composer
- Samuel Barnes – composer
- Cory Rooney – composer, keyboards, keyboard programming
- Albert Johnson – composer
- Kejuan Muchita – composer
- Poke and Tone – producer, drum programming
- Kelly Price – background vocals
- Dana Jon Chappelle – engineering
- Mike Scott – engineering
- Bill Esses – engineering
- Franklin Grant – engineering
- Ian Dalsemer – assistant engineering
- Ken Ross – assistant engineering
- Oliver "Wiz" Bone – assistant engineering
- Tony Maserati – mixing
- Herb Powers Jr. – mastering

== Charts ==
Chart (1998)	Peak position
Netherlands (Dutch Top 40 Tipparade)	7
Netherlands (Single Top 100)	63
UK Singles (Official Charts)	87
UK Hip Hop/R&B (Official Charts)	15
UK R&B Albums (OCC)	21
UK Club (Music Week)	25 (Note: Mobb Deep mix; with "Fly Away (Butterfly Reprise)" David Morales & Satoshi Tomiie mixes)
UK Club (Music Week)	30 (Note: David Morales mixes)
UK Pop Club (Music Week)	39
UK Urban Club (Music Week)	4 (Note: Mobb Deep mix)
UK Urban Club (Music Week)	9 (Note: Full Crew mixes)
