= Close My Eyes (Mariah Carey song) =

Song by Mariah Carey

from the album Butterfly
- Studio: Crave Studios (New York City, NY); The Hit Factory (New York City, NY)
- Length: 4:19
- Label: Columbia
- Composers: Mariah Carey; Walter Afanasieff
- Lyricist: Carey
- Producers: Carey; Afanasieff

"Close My Eyes" is a song recorded by American singer-songwriter Mariah Carey for her sixth studio album Butterfly (1997). It was co-written and produced by Carey and Walter Afanasieff. While Carey solely wrote the lyrics to the song, both she and Afanasieff composed its music. They also produced and arranged the song together. The lyrics of the downtempo piano-led song speak of the negative experiences in her life, including indirectly talking about the relationship between her and ex-husband Tommy Mottola. In September 2012, Carey revealed that it is one of her most favorite and revealing songs that she has written in her career thus far.

== Background ==
Carey began working on Butterfly in January 1997. During the album's development in mid-1997, Carey separated from her husband, music executive Tommy Mottola, who had guided her career since 1988. Carey's increasing control over her own career had led to speculation in the press over the future of the couple, and they later divorced. Throughout the development of the album, in a departure from her previous style, Carey worked with various rappers and hip-hop producers, including Sean "Puffy" Combs, Kamaal Fareed, Missy Elliott and Jean Claude Oliver and Samuel Barnes from Trackmasters. Critics saw Carey's new production team as a form of revenge on Mottola and Sony Music. Carey denied taking a radically new direction, and insisted that the musical style of her new album was of her own choosing. Nevertheless, Carey resented the control that Sony, whose president was Mottola, exercised over her music, preventing her making music about which she was passionate. In contrast, Sony were concerned Carey, their best-selling act, could jeopardize her future success through her actions. The pressure of the separation and constant press attention began to take its toll of Carey. Growing creative differences with producer Walter Afanasieff ended their working relationship, after collaborating on most of Carey's previous output. The breaking point came after a heated argument during a long recording session, over the album's musical direction. Carey also faced media criticism over her choice of producers and several newspapers linked Carey romantically to several rappers, suggesting these relationships influenced her decisions. However, Carey denied the allegations, stating she had only slept with her husband.

== Production and recording ==
"Close My Eyes" was co-written by Carey and Walter Afanasieff; Carey solely wrote the lyrics, while both she and Afanasieff composed the musical structure. It was also produced and arranged by Carey and Afanasieff. The keyboards, synthesizers and programming were performed by Afanasieff. Additional keys, drum and rhythm programming, sound design and computer programming were carried out by Dan Shea. Dana Jon Chappelle and Mike Scott served as the engineers, while Ian Dalsemer was enlisted as the assistant engineer. "Close My Eyes" was recorded at Crave Studios and The Hit Factory, both situated in New York City. It was mixed by Mick Gazauski at both Crave Studios and The Hit Factory. It was mastered by Bob Ludwig at Gateway Mastering in Portland, ME.

== Composition and lyrical interpretation ==
"Close My Eyes" is a downtempo piano led song, which runs for a duration of four minutes and 19 seconds. The lyrical content of the song speaks indirectly about Carey's relationship with Mottola, and reflects on times in her life where she has had personal struggles and troubles. Her past is presented in the lyrics "I was a wayward child, with the weight of the world that I held deep inside" and "Life was a winding road, and I learned many things little ones shouldn't know." As described by David Browne for Entertainment Weekly, Carey "paints herself" in the lyrics as "A wayward child, with the weight of the world". He also noted that the singer seems concerned that she had to grow up quicker than was perhaps necessary, in order to live her life in a controlled environment, "Maybe I grew up a little too soon." During the chorus, Carey lightens the mood of the song by singing about having courage to face times of adversity, "But I closed my eyes, steadied my feet on the ground, raised my head to the sky. And though times rolled by, still I feel like a child as I look at the moon. Maybe I grew up a little too soon." Jon Pareles for The New York Times wrote that Carey "coos" the lyrics "Maybe I grew up a little too soon" and "That woman-child inside was on the verge of fading/ Thankfully I woke up in time."

In an interview with CNN on September 7, 2012, where she was honored by Broadcast Music, Inc. for her songwriting, Carey declared "Close My Eyes" as one of her favorite and most revealing songs that she has written. She stated that it is not always her number one or signature songs which are her favorite, rather, they are "lesser-known cuts from more obscure records." When asked about how she felt about some of her number-one singles, including "Hero" (Music Box, 1993), "We Belong Together" (The Emancipation of Mimi, 2005) and "Touch My Body" (E=MC², 2008), the singer revealed "I still love those songs, [but] I love the obscure songs because they're very close to my heart. Especially a song called 'Close My Eyes,' that's like my life story." In addition to "Close My Eyes," Carey cited "Looking In," "I Am Free," and "Underneath the Stars" (Daydream, 1995) as some of her favorites.

== Critical reception ==
David Browne for Entertainment Weekly described how "Close My Eyes", as well as the album's title track, were not difficult songs to interpret, writing "It isn't a reach to interpret these songs as describing life with the reportedly controlling Mottola." Jon Pareles for The New York Times wrote that with regard to the lyrics "Maybe I grew up a little too soon" and "That woman-child inside was on the verge of fading/ Thankfully I woke up in time," "Carey isn't about to turn into Alanis Morissette; Butterfly proclaims dependence more humbly than ever." In their guide to Carey's albums, Rolling Stone stated that "Close My Eyes," along with "Butterfly" and "Breakdown," were songs which indirectly spoke about her "pending extraction from the tentacles" of Mottola, who exercised his power over her as the head of Sony, the label to which Carey was signed.

== Live performances ==
Carey performed "Close My Eyes" for the first time live on The Rosie O'Donnell Show in 1997. The performance saw Carey perform the song sitting on a stool, wearing a white vest top and jeans. It was also included on the set list of her 1998 Butterfly World Tour and 2000 Rainbow World Tour. She performed a shortened version of the song on Good Morning America on August 20, 2020, as part of promotion of her compilation album The Rarities released October 2, 2020.

== In other media ==
The song is included on the U.S. release of The Essential Mariah Carey. On Carey's official Facebook page on May 12, 2012, shortly after the release, she wrote, "I spent four years writing this song, only because after I performed in Schenectady, NY, I started hearing this melody and singing it over and over to myself as I was taking a bath, looking at the moon.. Four years later, as I was leaving a devastating part of my life behind, I wrote the second verse, the bridge and the outro." An acoustic version was featured on her compilation album The Rarities.

== Credits and personnel ==
Credits adapted from the liner notes of Butterfly.

Recording

- Recorded at Crave Studios, New York City; The Hit Factory, New York City.
- Mixed at Gateway Mastering, Portland, ME.

Personnel

- Lyrics – Mariah Carey
- Music – Mariah Carey, Walter Afanasieff
- Production – Mariah Carey, Walter Afanasieff
- Arranging – Mariah Carey, Walter Afanasieff
- Mixing – Bob Ludwig
- Keys, synths, programming – Walter Afanasieff
- Additional keys, drum and rhythm programming, sound design and computer programming – Dan Shea
- Engineers – Dana Jon Chappelle, Mike Scott
- Assistant engineers – Ian Dalsemer

== Works cited ==
- Nickson, Chris (1998). Mariah Carey Revisited: The Unauthorized Biography. St. Martin's Griffin. ISBN 0312195125.
- Shapiro, Marc (2001). Mariah Carey. ECW Press. ISBN 1550224441.
