= Butterfly (Mariah Carey album) =

- Standard artwork

Studio album by Mariah Carey
- Released: September 10, 1997
- Recorded: November 1996 – July 1997
- Studios: The Hit Factory (New York City); Compass Point Studios (The Bahamas); Crave Studios (New York City); WallyWorld (California); Daddy's House (New York City) (Note: Daddy's House was a recording studio owned by Sean Combs)
- Genres: R&B; pop; hip hop
- Length: 57:20
- Label: Columbia
- Producers: Mariah Carey; Walter Afanasieff; Sean "Puffy" Combs; The Ummah; Stevie J; Trackmasters; Cory Rooney; David Morales

Mariah Carey chronology
Daydream (1995)	Butterfly (1997)	#1's (1998)

Singles from Butterfly
- 1. "Honey" Released: July 29, 1997; 2. "Butterfly" Released: September 29, 1997; 3. "Breakdown" Released: January 6, 1998; 4. "The Roof (Back in Time)" Released: March 16, 1998; 5. "My All" Released: April 21, 1998

Butterfly is the sixth studio album by American singer-songwriter Mariah Carey, released on September 10, 1997, by Columbia Records. The album continued the transition that began with her previous album, Daydream (1995), which pushed her further into the R&B and hip hop market and away from the pop background of her previous work.

Throughout the project, Carey worked with Walter Afanasieff, with whom she had written and produced most of the material from her previous albums. She also worked with many famed hip-hop producers and rappers, such as Sean "Puffy" Combs, Q-Tip, Missy Elliott and the Trackmasters. The album contains both hip-hop and urban adult contemporary sounds, as well as some softer and more contemporary melodies. With the latter acts producing most of the album, Butterfly deviated from the adult contemporary sound of Carey's previous albums. Carey was able to reflect her creative maturity and evolution in the album's writing and recording.

Five singles were released from the album; two worldwide commercial singles and three limited-release singles. "Honey", the album's lead single, topped the charts in Canada and the United States, and reached the top five in New Zealand, Spain and the United Kingdom. The album's fifth and final single, "My All", became a top-ten hit throughout Europe and topped the charts in the United States. To promote the album, Carey embarked on the Butterfly World Tour, which visited Australia, Japan and Taiwan, with one show in the United States. Butterfly was nominated for three Grammy Awards at the 40th Annual Grammy Awards.

Butterfly received widespread critical acclaim from music critics, many of whom embraced Carey's musical transition. Reviewers complimented the album for its mature sound and production, as well as her musical direction. Retrospectively, it has been hailed as an R&B classic and is regarded as Carey's magnum opus. Though released during Carey's heavily publicized conflict with Sony Music, the album became an international commercial success, topping the albums charts in many countries, including Australia, Canada, Greece, Japan, the Netherlands, as well as the United States. It was certified five-times Platinum by the Recording Industry Association of America (RIAA) in the United States and received the Million Award in Japan. Globally, Butterfly has sold over ten million copies.

== Background and release ==
In the past, people were scared to let me explore different types of music that I loved and enjoyed. They [the studio heads] saw me as having this instrument, and they wanted to get the most use out of it. There were a lot of people around me who were afraid of change. I was a valuable commodity, and they didn't want to lose that. I was encouraged to act drab, because drab sells records.

— Carey, on her conflict with Sony Music

Carey began working on Butterfly in November 1996. During the album's development in mid-1997 Carey separated from her husband, music executive Tommy Mottola, who had guided her career since 1990. Carey's increasing control over her own career had led to speculation in the press over the future of the couple, and they later divorced. Throughout the development of the album, in a departure from her previous style, Carey worked with various rappers and hip hop producers, including Sean "Puffy" Combs, Q-Tip, Missy Elliott and Jean Claude Oliver and Samuel Barnes from Trackmasters. Critics saw Carey's new production team as a form of revenge on Mottola and Sony Music. Carey denied taking a radically new direction, and insisted that the musical style of her new album was of her own choosing. Nevertheless, Carey resented the control that Sony, whose president was Mottola, exercised over her music, preventing her from making music about which she was passionate. In contrast, Sony was concerned Carey, their best-selling act, could jeopardize her future success through her actions.

The pressure of the separation and constant press attention began to take its toll on Carey. Growing creative differences with producer Walter Afanasieff ended their working relationship, after collaborating on most of Carey's previous output. The breaking point came after a heated argument during a long recording session, over the album's musical direction. Carey also faced media criticism over her choice of producers and several newspapers linked Carey romantically to several rappers, suggesting these relationships influenced her decisions. However, Carey denied the allegations, stating she had only slept with her husband.

Butterfly was first issued on September 10, 1997, in Taiwan, Germany, France, and Japan. Releases followed on September 11 in the United Kingdom; September 12 in Australia, New Zealand, and the rest of Asia and Europe; and September 16 in the Americas. It was issued as an LP, cassette, compact disc, and/or MiniDisc depending on the country. In the United States, Columbia also issued a cassette/CD package set, the first such configuration by a record label.

== Writing and composition ==
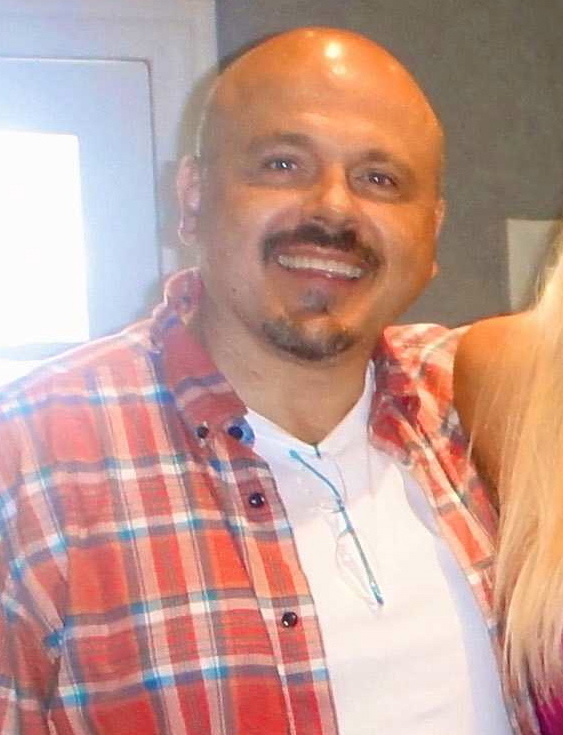
Walter Afanasieff co-wrote and co-produced six tracks on Butterfly, becoming his last major contributions on a Mariah Carey album.

Butterfly was described as an R&B, pop and hip hop music album with hip hop soul elements. With a variety of writers and producers and its new musical direction for Carey, the album was always likely to be a commercial success. Carey collaborated with Combs on the lead single, "Honey". Combs believed this to be a good song but was uncertain how successful it would be as a release owing to its heavy hip hop influence. The remix for "Honey" featured rapping lead vocals from Da Brat, The LOX and Mase, and some verses were rapped by Combs himself. The track was very different from Carey's previous recordings, and was described by author Chris Nickson as "street Hip-Hop music, with a booming bass." The song's melody was driven by Q-Tip's drum programming and Stevie J's keyboard notes. Combs's production gave the song a "light and airy" effect, further distancing it from Carey's contemporary sound. "Honey" featured musical samples from Treacherous Three's "The Body Rock", and "Hey DJ" by The World's Famous Supreme Team. The track used both hip hop and R&B with traces of pop music and was described as a "[song with a] catchy chorus, combining hip hop and pop into something that simply wasn't going to be denied by anyone, and offering a powerful start to a record."

The album's second single, "Butterfly", was one of the ballads Carey wrote with Afanasieff. Carey described the song as the "favorite ballad she had ever written", one that was more personal than her previous work as the emotions conveyed through the song allude at just how meaningful the lyrics are to her. Carey solely wrote the lyrics while Afanasieff handled the song's instrumentals, and added a few personal R&B touches. Another ballad Carey wrote with Afanasieff was "My All", written as a contrast to the album's general hip hop flavor. Carey described the song as having "a lush sound and intense styling". It featured guitar arpeggios, which were synthetically created using sampling and keyboard notes. "The Roof", Butterfly's European single, incorporated fragments from Mobb Deep's "Shook Ones (Part II)", and was produced by Carey, Poke & Tone and Cory Rooney.

I had the hook already, as well as a melody and lyric for the chorus. Then she and I collaborated on a new melody for the verses, and we did the first verse, and the second half of the second verse together.

— Carey, on working with Elliott on "Babydoll"

"Fourth of July", one of the album's slower ballads, was also written solely by Carey and Afanasieff but was not released as a single. The song was perceived to have jazz influences and was compared to some of Carey's older work such as "Vanishing" and "The Wind". The next two tracks on the record, "Breakdown" and "Babydoll", were described as "the album's backbone, its real declaration of independence" by Nickson. "Breakdown" was written by Carey and Puffy and included rap verses from Wish and Krayzie Bone from Bone Thugs-n-Harmony. Author Chris Nickson wrote that "'Breakdown' showed Mariah treading forcefully into territory that was new for her and making it her own." For "Babydoll", Carey teamed up with Elliott. The track was recorded in Atlanta, where Elliott resided, and included background vocals from Carey's long-time friend, Trey Lorenz. "Babydoll" is an R&B ballad with trip hop and drum and bass influences, and was described as "a vocally driven piece", with strong jazz harmony provided by Cory Rooney. Other songs that incorporated R&B influence into ballads were "Whenever You Call" and "Close My Eyes", which were personally important to Carey due to their lyrical content. While both were similar ballads to Carey's previous work, Nickson said:

While up to the standard of anything Mariah had ever done before, [they] suffered in comparison. But even here you could hear the new Mariah in the spareness of the arrangements and the way it was her voice, rather than any instrument, that controlled the song. She'd grown to the point where having less behind her really proved to be more, for the song and for her. It was notable, too, that like the other ballads on the record, these two leaned very much towards R&B.

Carey wrote the song "Fly Away (Butterfly Reprise)" with famed house music producer David Morales. When imagining the concept for "Butterfly", Carey intended the song to be a house music record, but after writing it, made it into a ballad. Carey expressed a desire to feature her concept both on the house record, in addition to the ballad that would become "Butterfly". Morales took Carey's lyrics, concept and melody and added a house beat to it. For the album, Carey recorded a version of Prince's "The Beautiful Ones", featuring Dru Hill, with Dru Hill lead singer Sisqó sharing much of the lead with her. The song was one of the last recorded tracks and was the only non-original song on Butterfly. The final song on the album was "Outside", a ballad that was written by Carey, Afanasieff and Rooney, about Carey's experience being biracial. Richard Harrington from The Washington Post described the album's subtle inclusion of both pop and R&B genres:

There are two Mariah Careys on Butterfly. One is the pop-oriented, ballad-leaning traditionalist who works very effectively with her longtime professional partner, composer-producer Walter Afanasieff. The other is a self-styled hip-hop fanatic who worked with Ol' Dirty Bastard on her last album and teams up here with several of that genre's movers and shakers, most notably Sean "Puffy" Combs, the godfather of hip-hop soul and the hottest producer in pop music today.

== Promotion ==
To promote Butterfly, Carey made many live appearances. On September 12, 1997, Carey was interviewed about her split from Mottola and sang a live rendition of "Butterfly" and "Hero" on The Oprah Winfrey Show. Carey also featured as a musical guest on November 15, 1997, on Saturday Night Live, performing "Butterfly" again, as well as the Spanish-inspired "My All". She made two appearances on The Rosie O'Donnell Show; she performed "My All" and on her return visit, sang "Close My Eyes" live for the first time. Carey also gave performances at awards shows, singing "My All" at the 1998 Blockbuster Entertainment Awards and "Honey" at the 1998 World Music Awards. In Europe, Carey made several promotional television appearances. In the United Kingdom, Carey performed "My All" and "Honey" on the Des O'Connor Show and Top of the Pops. In Germany, she sang "Butterfly" on Wetten, dass..? and performed on Japanese television.

Originally, Carey had not planned to tour, after receiving mixed reviews in the US for her Music Box Tour. However, after the album's release, many fans requested Carey to tour, especially in Asia and Australia. Therefore, Carey embarked on the Butterfly World Tour; her third head-lining tour and most extensive to date. The tour included eleven shows, four in Japan's largest stadium, Tokyo Dome, one in Taiwan, five in Australia and one in the United States. As part of her performance at the 50,000-capacity Aloha Stadium in Hawaii, Carey filmed a concert video, Around the World. The video was a compilation DVD which included parts of Carey's shows in Japan, Australia and Hawaii. The tour was a critical and commercial success. Both fans and critics praised the quality of the show and Carey's vocals.

=== Singles ===
Five singles were released from Butterfly; some featured as airplay-only singles, while others were released only in certain territories. "Honey" was released as the album's first single to mainstream and rhythmic radio on July 29, 1997. The song became Carey's twelfth number-one single on the Billboard Hot 100 and topped the chart in Canada, while reaching the top five in New Zealand, Spain and the United Kingdom. It was certified platinum by the Recording Industry Association of America (RIAA), for shipments of one million units in the United States, and received a gold certification in Australia. "Honey" was well-received, with critics complimenting its catchy sound and clever fusion of pop and R&B sounds. The title track served as the album's second single, but it was released as an "airplay-only" single due to Carey's conflict with Sony. Though not being released commercially by her label, "Butterfly" reached number sixteen on the Hot 100 Airplay, as well as the top twenty in New Zealand.

"Breakdown" was the third single released from Butterfly. The song received a limited release throughout certain countries, such as the United States, where it peaked at number four on the Hot R&B/Hip-Hop Songs. Aside from the US, "Breakdown" achieved a steady peak of number four on the New Zealand singles chart, in addition to entering the top forty in Australia. While not one of Carey's best-known hits, "Breakdown" remains one of her most praised songs, receiving acclaim for assisting Carey's transition into the R&B market. In his review for the album, Rich Juzwiak from Slant magazine wrote the following:

The song of Carey's career, where the lyrical strokes are as broad and obvious as they are naked. Mariah the chanter flawlessly adapts to their singsong style, largely boxing her multi-octave range into a sly, hypnotic melody so that when she really wails at the end, you really feel it. Carey lunges toward musical maturity by embracing, not shunning hip-hop. This is the height of her elegance and maybe hip-hop-soul's, too.

While "Breakdown" served as the album's third single in the United States, New Zealand and Australia, "The Roof" was released in Europe. It performed weakly on the charts, peaking at number 96 in the United Kingdom, and faring only slightly better in the Netherlands, where it peaked at number 63. While not commercially released in the US, the song's music video received heavy rotation on MTV and VH1, due to the record's popularity.

"My All" was chosen as the album's fifth and final single, and its second commercially released single. The song was the most commercially successful song on Butterfly, becoming Carey's thirteenth chart topper in the US, and reaching the top ten throughout Europe. In France, "My All" peaked at number six, and was certified silver by the Syndicat National de l'Édition Phonographique (SNEP). In the United States, the song finished at number seventeen, on the Billboard Year-End chart, remaining Carey's highest-charting single of 1998.

=== 25th anniversary ===
In September 2022, for the album's twenty-fifth anniversary, Carey announced a deluxe reissue "with eight new bonus tracks from the Butterfly sessions". This was announced alongside merchandise, new vinyl releases, 4K remasters for music videos, and a documentary for the making of the "Honey" music video.

== Critical reception ==
Professional ratings
Review scores
Source	Rating
AllMusic	4.5/5 stars
Chicago Tribune	2.5/4 stars
Entertainment Weekly	B−
Los Angeles Times	3/4 stars
NME	4/10
Rolling Stone	3/5 stars
The Rolling Stone Album Guide	4/5 stars
Slant Magazine	4.5/5 stars
USA Today	3/4 stars
The Village Voice	(dud)

Butterfly garnered general acclaim from music critics. In The New Rolling Stone Album Guide, Arion Berger praised the album's producers and Carey's "more controlled" vocals. Berger noticed a connection between much of Carey's lyrics and her separation from Mottola. Jon Pareles, editor of The New York Times called Butterfly "a new turn" in Carey's career. He wrote, "Carey has sold tens of millions of albums by being the girl next door with the startling vocal range... but for most of Butterfly Carey turned her voice into an airy whisper, as if she would rather charm listeners" compared to over-powering them. Aside from commenting on its deviance from Carey's previous work, he noted songs in which Carey alludes to her failed marriage to Mottola, such as "Butterfly" and "Close My Eyes" which were both released on the album following the divorce with lyrics about letting love go and life struggles. Additionally he wrote, "Since Carey writes her own lyrics, fans might expect a glimpse of marital discord or pride in her new-found autonomy." David Browne from Entertainment Weekly gave Butterfly a B− in his review. Browne wrote: "In 'Breakdown', [Carey] demonstrates she can match the staccato, lite-reggae phrasing of her guests, two members of Bone Thugs-N-Harmony." He described an increased intimacy in the music but noted the arrangement made it difficult to hear the lyrics Carey was singing. "Butterfly is undeniably pleasant, with little of the all-conquering bombast usually associated with Carey. But it's also the last thing anyone would have expected from her: blandly self-effacing."

In a retrospective review of the album, Stephen Thomas Erlewine from AllMusic appreciated the new direction of Carey's music, commenting on the increased urban feel of the work. He described the record as "a collection of hit singles surrounded by classy filler" and "while [the songs] are all well-crafted, many of them blend together upon initial listening". However, he noted an increased control in her voice which led him to describe some of the ballads such as 'Butterfly' and 'Breakdown' as among her best work. He said Butterfly was one of Carey's best records and she was "continuing to improve and refine her music, which makes her a rarity among her '90s peers." Erlewine gave the album a score of four out of five stars; but in 2021 the AllMusic website upgraded the rating by a half star. Rich Juzwiak from Slant Magazine awarded the album a score of four and a half out of five stars, calling it "elegant" and praising Carey's mature vocals. Juzwiak particularly praised "Breakdown", which he called one of the album's best tracks. Of Carey's vocals, he wrote, "The relatively high and thin register that she sings in when not belting (and that's often) could be the most important of Butterfly's changes, as it marks the first time that Mariah the vocalist seems consistently real. She's utterly soulful."

=== Accolades ===
Publication	Accolade	Rank	Ref.
Complex	The Best R&B Albums of '90s	5	
Pitchfork	The 150 Best Albums of the 1990s	60	

== Commercial performance ==
Butterfly debuted at number one on the US Billboard 200 selling 235,500 copies in the first week after its release on the week of October 4, 1997, the highest of her career at the time. It maintained that position for one week and remained in the top twenty for 21 weeks; it stayed in the chart for 55 weeks, including one re-entry. The album achieved its highest weekly sales in its fifteenth week of release, when it was at number eight on the chart with 283,000 copies sold. It also peaked at number three on Top R&B/Hip-Hop Albums. In the United States, Butterfly was certified five-times platinum by the Recording Industry Association of America (RIAA). Nielsen SoundScan estimates the album's sales at 3,807,000 copies in the US. In Canada, the album debuted at number one and was certified double-platinum by the Canadian Recording Industry Association (CRIA), denoting shipments of 200,000 copies of the album. Butterfly debuted at number one in Australia, and received a double-platinum certification from the Australian Recording Industry Association (ARIA), 140,000 units.

In Europe, Butterfly peaked within the top five in several European countries. It received a platinum certification by the International Federation of the Phonographic Industry (IFPI), denoting shipments of well one million copies throughout Europe. In the United Kingdom, Butterfly debuted at number two based on 29,000 sales over three days. Alan Jones of Music Week described this as unexpectedly low given that Daydream had previously debuted at number one based on three-day sales. The album was later certified platinum by the British Phonographic Industry (BPI), denoting shipments of 300,000 copies. In France, the album peaked at number six, where it was certified double-gold by the Syndicat National de l'Édition Phonographique (SNEP).

As with many of Carey's previous records, Butterfly became a large success in Asia. In Japan, the record debuted at number one on the album charts, selling 1.15 million copies in its first week. The album was certified the Million Award by the Recording Industry Association of Japan (RIAJ), denoting shipments of one million copies. In Hong Kong, Butterfly finished as one of the twenty best-selling foreign albums of 1997, receiving a platinum certification by IFPI. Globally, Butterfly has sold over 10 million copies.

== Legacy ==
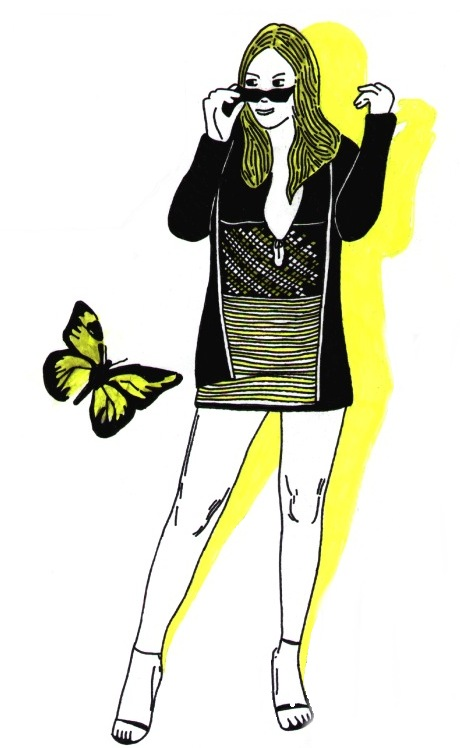
Artwork of Carey with a butterfly, which became a metaphorical symbol of her impact and legacy upon pop and R&B music.

In the years since its release, Butterfly has been hailed as being an R&B classic. In a retrospective review for The Washington Post, Bethonie Butler focused on the album's impact, stating that it "changed the face of pop music" by paving "the way for other pop stars...to sing alongside their rap contemporaries". Writing for Jezebel, Rich Juzwiak focused on the influence of Carey's vocal stylings in the track "Breakdown", remarking that "in this day and age, when there's so much genre blending that it's sometimes impossible to label an artist as merely "singer" or "rapper", it'd be foolish to understate the prescience of" the song. A profile of the album in Essence by Jessica Littles further stated that the album "catalyzed the pop music trend of collaborating with hip-hop artists", concluding that it "not only showcased her [Carey's] already-established prowess as a vocalist, who could belt out ballads or flirt over the hottest summer jams, but also as one of the most versatile songwriters in contemporary music".

The lead single from the album, "Honey", was notable for pushing Carey further towards hip hop and R&B than before. The music video gained further attention, as Carey, for the first time in her career, was provocatively dressed, giving viewers a "taste of the freer Mariah". The Puerto Rico-filmed video's concept was created by Carey with Paul Hunter filling in as the director. Featuring a James Bond theme, Carey was a "very sexy agent M", in the words of Nickson, who escapes a large mansion in which she has been held captive. Carey said of the video: "I don't really think the video is overtly sexual, but for me—I mean people used to think I was the nineties version of Mary Poppins!" At the time of the video's release, Carey and Mottola were in the midst of their divorce. Tabloids and critics were linking the video's theme to Carey's marriage, writing how Mottola would lock her in their mansion, although she denied this. In an interview, Carey said that "Tommy loves the video, he says it's my best video yet." Carey's writing partner of six years, Afanasieff, felt the video was undeniably about Mottola.

The music video for "The Roof" was ranked 18th on Slant's "100 Greatest Music Videos". Sal Ciquemani, from Slant, gave the video a positive review, complimenting Carey's pairing the sultry song with a "sophisticated tale of a sexy rooftop encounter." The video shows Carey reminiscing on a past love and a night they shared together on a rainy roof-top. The video revolves around the settings of a dark limousine, a decrepit NYC apartment, and a rainy roof-top, where according to Slant, "Carey is featured at her most vulnerable, with runny mascara and drenched in the cold rainy night." In the conclusion of his review of the video, Ciquemani wrote: "When Carey rises through the limo's sunroof and relishes the warm November rain, she's not drunk on the bubbly but on the memory of past delights." The video for "My All" was also one of the more notable videos from Butterfly. The video featured Carey in various places, including a submerged vessel, a lighthouse and a large conch shell floating the shore. In each of the scenes, Carey is shown lamenting her love and yearning to be re-united with him once more. In the video's climax, Carey meets her love in the lighthouse, where they caress and drift into the "nights abyss". According to author Chris Nickson, the scenes of Carey on the overturned vessel showed her vulnerability without her loved one, truly emphasizing the yearning featured in the song.

Butterfly, recognized by critics as one of Carey's best albums at that point in her career, received several awards and was nominated for others. At the Billboard Music Awards, Carey received an honorary award, recognizing her achievement of earning "The Most Number-one Singles Ever by a Female Solo Artist in History". "Honey" was nominated at the 1998 Grammy Awards for Best Female R&B Vocal Performance and Best R&B Song, while "Butterfly" was nominated for Best Female Pop Vocal Performance. Butterfly won a Japan Gold Disc Award in the "International Pop Album of the Year" category. For Butterfly, Carey won the American Music Award for Favorite Soul/R&B Female Artist in 1998. Additionally, the album won the BMI Pop Award for Songwriter of the Year and the Songwriter awards for "Honey", "Butterfly" and "My All". At the Soul Train Music Awards in 1998, Carey won the awards for the Aretha Franklin Entertainer of the Year and Soul Train Lady of Soul, which were presented to her by Chris Tucker and Patti LaBelle.

Butterfly was nominated at the 1998 NAACP Image Awards, in the Outstanding Female Artist category. At the Blockbuster Entertainment Awards, Carey was named the Songwriter of the Year and received the Song of the Year award. At the 1998 World Music Awards, Carey won two of night's top awards; the World's Best-selling R&B Artist and the World's Best-selling Recording Artist of the '90s. Carey was unhappy not to win any of the Grammy Awards once again, but this was offset by the success of her tour, which was taking place during the awards. According to author Marc Shapiro, "No amount of awards could replace the popular acceptance of Butterfly and the feeling she was now free to live her own life – creatively and personally." In a recent list compiled by a selection of rock critics, Butterfly was chosen as one of the 1001 Albums You Must Hear Before You Die.

The album was released with two different covers and in 2007 one of them was listed on Maxim's Sexiest Album Covers.

== Track listing ==
All lyrics are written by Mariah Carey, except where noted; all music is composed by Mariah Carey and Walter Afanasieff, except where noted. All tracks are produced by Mariah Carey and Walter Afanasieff, except where noted.

Butterfly – Standard edition
No.	Title	Lyrics	Music	Producer(s)	Length
1.	"Honey"		Carey; Sean Combs; Kamaal Fareed; Steven Jordan; Stephen Hague; Bobby Robinson; Ronald Larkins; Larry Price; Malcolm McLaren; (uncredited) Kool Moe Dee	Combs; The Ummah; Stevie J; Carey	5:02
2.	"Butterfly"				4:36
3.	"My All"				3:53
4.	"The Roof (Back in Time)"		Carey; Jean-Claude Olivier; Samuel Barnes; Cory Rooney; Albert Johnson; Kejuan Muchita	Poke and Tone; Carey	5:15
5.	"Fourth of July"				4:23
6.	"Breakdown" (featuring Krayzie Bone and Wish Bone)	Carey; Anthony Henderson; Charles Scruggs	Carey; Stevie J	Carey; Stevie J; Combs	4:45
7.	"Babydoll"	Carey; Missy Elliott	Carey; Rooney; Stevie J	Carey; Rooney	5:07
8.	"Close My Eyes"				4:22
9.	"Whenever You Call"				4:22
10.	"Fly Away" (Butterfly Reprise)	Carey; Elton John; Bernie Taupin	Carey; David Morales	Carey^{[a]}; Morales^{[a]}	3:49
11.	"The Beautiful Ones" (Prince cover) (featuring Dru Hill)	Prince	Prince	Carey; Rooney	7:00
12.	"Outside"			Carey; Afanasieff; Rooney^{[a]}	4:46
Total length:					57:20

Butterfly – European/Japanese edition (bonus tracks)
No.	Title	Music	Producer(s)	Length
13.	"Honey" (So So Def Radio Mix) (featuring Da Brat and JD)	Carey; Robinson; Hague; Larkins; Price; McLaren; Freddie Perren; Alphonzo Mizell; Berry Gordy; Dennis Lussier	Jermaine Dupri; Manuel Seal^{[a]}	3:59
14.	"Honey" (Def Club Mix)	Carey; Robinson	Morales^{[a]}; Carey^{[a]}; Albert Cabrera^{[b]}	6:17
Total length:				67:36

Butterfly – Latin American edition (bonus track)
No.	Title	Lyrics	Length
15.	"Mi Todo" (My All) (Spanish version)	Carey; Manny Benito	3:53
Total length:			71:29

Butterfly: 25th Anniversary Expanded Edition
No.	Title	Music	Producer(s)	Length
13.	"Whenever You Call" (with Brian McKnight)			4:22
14.	"The Roof (When I Feel the Need)" (featuring Brandy)	Olivier; Barnes; Rooney; Johnson; Muchita	Carey; Daniel Moore II; Tremaine "Six7" Williams	4:54
15.	"Butterfly" (Live from The Late Show With David Letterman)			4:14
16.	"My All" (Live from VH1 Divas 1998)			5:28
17.	"Fourth of July" (A cappella)			4:16
18.	"Outside" (A cappella)			4:16
19.	"Butterfly (Amorphous Anniversary Club Mix)" (with Amorphous)		Carey; Afanasieff; Amorphous	6:06
20.	"Honey" (Another Taste of Honey David Morales Mix)	Carey; Combs; Fareed; Jordan; Hague; Robinson; Larkins; Price; McLaren; Dewese	Morales	7:55
Total length:				98:51

Notes

- ^{^[a]} signifies a co-producer
- ^{^[b]} signifies an additional producer
- "Honey" contains a sample of The Treacherous Three's "The Body Rock" (1980) and The World's Famous Supreme Team's "Hey DJ" (1984)
- "The Roof" contains a sample of Mobb Deep's "Shook Ones (Part II)" (1994) and Run-DMC's "Rock Box" (1984)
- "Breakdown" contains an interpolation of Bone Thugs-n-Harmony's "Tha Crossroads" (1996)
- "Fly Away (Butterfly Reprise)" contains an interpolation of Elton John's "Someone Saved My Life Tonight" (1975)
- "Honey" (So So Def Remix) contains a sample of The Jackson 5's "It's Great to Be Here" (1971) and an interpolation of The World's Famous Supreme Team's "Hey DJ" (1984)

== Personnel ==
Adapted from the Butterfly liner notes.

- Mariah Carey – lead vocals, background vocals (1, 2, 4, 6, 7, 10)
- Walter Afanasieff – keyboards, synthesizers, and programming (2, 3, 5, 8, 9, 12)
- Dan Shea – additional keyboards, drum and rhythm programming, sound design, and computer programming (2, 3, 5, 8, 9, 12)
- Stevie J – keyboards, keyboard programming, and drum programming (1, 6)
- Cory Rooney – keyboards and keyboard programming (4, 7)
- Q-Tip – drum programming (1)
- Poke and Tone – drum programming (4)
- Peter "Ski" Schwartz – keyboards (10)
- Nathaniel Townsley – drums (12)
- Artie Reynolds – bass guitar (12)
- Gary Montoute – Hammond B-3 (12)
- Donald Parker – piano and keyboards (12)
- Michael Cirro – guitar (12)
- Michael Phillips – EWI (12)
- Mase – additional vocals (1)
- The Lox – additional vocals (1)
- Krayzie Bone – lead and background vocals (6)
- Wish Bone – lead and background vocals (6)
- Dru Hill – vocals (11)
- Melonie Daniels – background vocals (1, 2, 10)
- Mary Ann Tatum – background vocals (2, 10)
- Kelly Price – background vocals (4)
- Trey Lorenz – background vocals (7)
- Clarence – background vocals (9)

Production

- Mariah Carey – arranger (2, 3, 5, 8, 9, 11, 12)
- Walter Afanasieff – arranger (2, 3, 5, 8, 9, 12)
- Cory Rooney – arranger (11)
- Dru Hill – arranger (11)
- Ron Grant – additional arranging (12)
- David Morales – additional production, arranger, and mixing (10)
- Satoshi Tomiie – additional production, arranger, and mixing (10)
- Dana Jon Chappelle – engineer (1–12)
- Mike Scott – engineer (2–5, 7, 8, 12), assistant engineer (9), mixing (7, 12)
- Glen Marchese – engineer (1, 11)
- Rich Travali – engineer (1)
- David Gleeson – engineer (2)
- Bill Esses – engineer (4)
- Franklin Grant – engineer (4)
- Doug Wilson – engineer (7)
- David "EQ3" Sussman – engineer (10)
- Ian Dalsemer – assistant engineer (1–8, 11, 12)
- Ken Ross – assistant engineer (1, 4, 7)
- Oliver "Wiz" Bone – assistant engineer (2, 4)
- Steve Jones – assistant engineer (7)
- Ann Mincieli – assistant engineer (10)
- Greg Thompson – assistant engineer (11)
- Tony Maserati – mixing (1, 4, 6)
- Mick Guzauski – mixing (2, 3, 5, 7–9, 11, 12)
- Herb Powers Jr. – mastering (1, 4, 6, 7, 10, 11)
- Bob Ludwig – mastering (2, 3, 5, 8, 9, 12)

== Charts ==
=== Weekly charts ===
Chart (1997–1998)	Peak position
Australian Albums (ARIA)	1
Austrian Albums (Ö3 Austria)	5
Belgian Albums (Ultratop Flanders)	6
Belgian Albums (Ultratop Wallonia)	2
Canadian Albums (Billboard)	1
Canadian R&B Albums (SoundScan)	1
Czech Albums (ČNS IFPI)	13
Danish Albums (Hitlisten)	13
Dutch Albums (Album Top 100)	1
European Albums (Billboard)	2
Finnish Albums (Suomen virallinen lista)	12
French Albums (SNEP)	6
German Albums (Offizielle Top 100)	7
Greek Albums (IFPI)	1
Hungarian Albums (MAHASZ)	20
Irish Albums (IRMA)	6
Italian Albums (FIMI)	2
Japanese Albums (Oricon)	1
Malaysian Albums (RIM)	4
New Zealand Albums (RMNZ)	4
Norwegian Albums (VG-lista)	5
Portuguese Albums (AFP)	8
Scottish Albums (Official Charts)	10
Singapore Albums (SPVA)	1
Spanish Albums (PROMUSICAE)	5
Swedish Albums (Sverigetopplistan)	4
Swiss Albums (Schweizer Hitparade)	3
Taiwanese Albums (IFPI)	2
UK Albums (Official Charts)	2
UK Dance Albums (OCC)	2
UK R&B Albums (Official Charts)	1
US Billboard 200	1
US Top R&B/Hip-Hop Albums (Billboard)	3
Zimbabwean Albums (ZIMA)	1

Chart (2017–2025)	Peak position
Greek Albums (IFPI)	99
UK Album Downloads (Official Charts)	45
UK R&B Albums (Official Charts)	13
UK Vinyl Albums (OCC)	26
US Vinyl Albums (Billboard)	11

=== Year-end charts ===
Chart (1997)	Position
Australian Albums (ARIA)	27
Belgian Albums (Ultratop Flanders)	69
Belgian Albums (Ultratop Wallonia)	39
Canada Top Albums/CDs (RPM)	24
Canadian Albums (SoundScan)	39
Dutch Albums (Album Top 100)	70
European Top 100 Albums (Music & Media)	42
German Albums (Offizielle Top 100)	74
Italian Albums (Musica e dischi)	38
Japanese Albums (Oricon)	24
Swiss Albums (Schweizer Hitparade)	48
UK Albums (OCC)	63
US Billboard 200	54
US Top R&B/Hip-Hop Albums (Billboard)	58

Chart (1998)	Position
Canadian Albums (SoundScan)	188
Canadian R&B Albums (SoundScan)	27
US Billboard 200	21
US Top R&B/Hip-Hop Albums (Billboard)	30

== Certifications and sales ==
Certifications and sales for Butterfly
Region	Certification	Certified units/sales
Australia (ARIA)	2× Platinum	140,000^{^}
Belgium (BRMA)	Gold	25,000^{*}
Brazil (Pro-Música Brasil)	Gold	100,000^{‡}
Canada (Music Canada)	2× Platinum	200,000^{^}
France (SNEP)	2× Gold	200,000^{*}
Hong Kong (IFPI Hong Kong)	Platinum	20,000^{*}
Japan (RIAJ)	Million	1,000,000^{^}
Netherlands (NVPI)	Gold	50,000^{^}
New Zealand (RMNZ)	Platinum	15,000^{^}
Poland (ZPAV)	Gold	50,000^{*}
Singapore (SPVA)	—	80,000
Spain (Promusicae)	Platinum	100,000^{^}
Switzerland (IFPI Switzerland)	Gold	25,000^{^}
United Kingdom (BPI)	Platinum	300,000^{‡}
United States (RIAA)	5× Platinum	5,000,000
Summaries
Europe (IFPI)	Platinum	1,000,000^{*}
Worldwide	—	10,000,000
^{*} Sales figures based on certification alone.^{^} Shipments figures based on certification alone.^{‡} Sales+streaming figures based on certification alone.

== Works cited ==
- Nickson, Chris (1998), Mariah Carey revisited: her story, St. Martin's Press, ISBN 978-0-312-19512-0
- Shapiro, Marc (2001), Mariah Carey: The Unauthorized Biography, ECW Press, ISBN 978-1-55022-444-3
