= Butterfly World Tour =

1998 concert tour by Mariah Carey

- Tour by Mariah Carey
- Butterfly World Tour book cover
- Location: Asia; Australia; North America
- Associated album: Butterfly
- Start date: January 11, 1998
- End date: February 21, 1998
- Legs: 3
- No. of shows: 11

Mariah Carey concert chronology
- Daydream World Tour (1996); Butterfly World Tour (1998); Rainbow World Tour (2000)

The Butterfly World Tour was the third concert tour by American singer-songwriter Mariah Carey. The tour promoted Carey's album Butterfly (1997), and included songs from several of her previous albums. The tour visited Asia, Australia and the United States, with rehearsals taking place in December 1997. Starting on January 11, 1998, the tour spanned five shows in Asia, six in Australia, and one in Hawaii, United States.

The tour was recorded on camera, resulting in a concert video released in VHS format, titled Around the World. The video featured live performances of Carey at different worldwide venues. The video was commercially successful, being certified platinum in the United States by the Recording Industry Association of America (RIAA) and gold in Brazil by the Associação Brasileira dos Produtores de Discos (ABPD).

== Background ==
Since her debut in 1990, Carey had not journeyed on a large or extensive tour. In fact, she had not embarked on a tour until her third studio effort, Music Box (1993), when she performed six arena shows in the United States during the Music Box Tour. The opening night of the tour received scathing reviews, mostly aimed at Carey's deemed "obvious" stage-fright and failure to make a connection with the crowd. Succeeding nights were more favorably reviewed, with critics raving about Carey's vocals. Jon Pareles of The New York Times wrote regarding Carey's live vocals, "Beyond any doubt, Ms. Carey's voice is no studio concoction. Her range extends from a rich, husky alto to dog-whistle high notes; she can linger over sensual turns, growl with playful confidence, syncopate like a scat singer." However, after the strong media attention, Carey did not visit the US on her succeeding Daydream World Tour in 1996, visiting only Europe and Asia. The tour in contrast, received critical acclaim from critics and fans alike, as well as breaking ticket sale records. During 1997, after the commercially and critically successful release of Butterfly, Carey had not planned to tour once again, due to the long travel times and strain on her voice. However, due to overwhelming demand by fans, Carey agreed to perform in Asia once again, only extending the tour to Taiwan and Australia, as well as one last show in the United States. Rehearsals for the show began shortly after Christmas 1997, extending for a period of two weeks.

Originally, the Butterfly Tour was to have a leg in North America. Due to Mariah's project of filming the movie Double-O Soul with Chris Tucker in early 1998, the North American leg was cancelled. However, Double-O Soul ended up not seeing the light of day.

== Reception ==
The show at Hawaii's 50,000 capacity Aloha Stadium made her one of the few acts in the stadium's history to sell out the entire venue. Aside from its commercial success, fans and critics raved about the show's visuals, as well as Carey's vocal delivery.

== Around the World ==
Around the World

Video by Mariah Carey
- Released: April 24, 1999 (U.S.)
- Recorded: 1998
- Genre: R&B; soul; pop; hip hop
- Length: 60:00
- Label: Columbia
- Producer: Jack Gulick; Mariah Carey (exec.)

Mariah Carey chronology
Fantasy: Mariah Carey at Madison Square Garden (1996)	Around the World (1999)	#1's (1999)

During the tour, several bits and performances were filmed and later edited into a VHS and DVD entitled Around the World. The VHS featured performances from Tokyo Dome, Aloha Stadium as well as few other skits and scenes that were later compiled into the video. The film first begins with performances in Hawaii, where the song's recitals are cut into halves, excluding the second verses and bridge to shorten the bulk length of the video. Afterwards, Carey's performance of "My All" is shown in inter-cut scenes from Japan and Taipei. After the conclusion of the song, scenes of Carey conversing with Brenda K. Starr are shown, which eventually lead to a tribute to her at a small and intimate New York club, where Carey performs "I Still Believe". Soon after, Carey's performance in Japan with Lorenz for "I'll Be There" is shown, leading to scenes of Carey swimming with dolphins in Australia. the next title on the video is Carey's live rendition of "Hopelessly Devoted To You", where she is joined by Olivia Newton-John on stage in Melbourne. A scene of a fans gathering outside of a New York City studio is shown, following a performance of "Honey," and "Hero" at Aloha Stadium. The VHS was a commercial success, being certified platinum by the Recording Industry Association of America (RIAA), denoting shipments of over 100,000 units. The video was also certified gold in Brazil by the Associação Brasileira dos Produtores de Discos (ABPD). It became available for digital download on the iTunes Store on December 7, 2021.

=== Track listing ===
No.	Title	Writer(s)	Length
1.	"Program start"		0:16
2.	"Butterfly Intro" / "Emotions"	Mariah Carey; Walter Afanasieff / Carey; Robert Clivillés; David Cole	4:14
3.	"Fantasy"	Carey; Ol' Dirty Bastard; Dave Hall; Chris Frantz; Tina Weymouth; Adrian Belew; Steven Stanley	5:27
4.	"Dreamlover"	Carey; Hall	2:49
5.	"My All"	Carey; Afanasieff	2:33
6.	"Japan / New York"		1:46
7.	"Conversation with Brenda K. Starr"		1:04
8.	"I Still Believe"	Antonina Armato; Giuseppe Cantarelli	3:40
9.	"I'll Be There" (featuring Trey Lorenz)	Berry Gordy; Bob West; Hal Davis; Willie Hutch	3:19
10.	"Fun in Australia"		2:43
11.	"Hopelessly Devoted to You" (with Olivia Newton-John)	John Farrar	2:00
12.	"#1's Fan Appreciation Party"		0:37
13.	"Whenever You Call" (with Brian McKnight)	Carey; Afanasieff	3:09
14.	"Honey"	Carey; Sean "Puffy" Combs; Kamaal Fareed; Steven Jordan; Stephen Hague; Bobby Robinson; Ronald Larkins; Larry Price; Malcolm McLaren	5:06
15.	"Hero"	Carey; Afanasieff	5:30
Total length:			44:13

Special Features
No.	Title	Director(s)	Length
1.	"Biography"
2.	"Discography"
3.	"Butterfly" (video)	Carey; Daniel Pearl	4:45
4.	"Breakdown" (video; featuring Krayzie Bone and Wish Bone)	Carey; Diane Martel	4:38
5.	"The Roof" (video)	Carey; Martel	5:35
6.	"My All" (video)	Herb Ritts	3:59

=== Chart performance ===
Chart	Peak position	Certification	Sales
Brazilian Music DVD Chart		Gold	25,000
UK Music Video (OCC)	2	Gold	25,000
U.S. Billboard Top Music Video	3	Platinum	100,000

== Set list ==
1. "Looking In"/"Butterfly" (Introduction)
2. "Emotions"
3. "The Roof (Back in Time)"
4. "My All"
5. "Close My Eyes" (With extended outro)
6. "Daydream Interlude" (Fantasy Sweet Dub Mix) (Performed by background dancers)
7. "Dreamlover"
8. "I'll Be There" (With Trey Lorenz)
9. "Make You Happy" (Performed by Trey Lorenz)
10. "Make It Happen"
11. "One Sweet Day"
12. "Ain't Nobody" (Band introductions)
13. "Fantasy" (Bad Boy Remix)
14. "Breakdown"
15. "Put Your Hands Where My Eyes Could See" (Performed by background dancers)
16. "Honey" (With elements of "Bad Boy Remix")
17. "Vision of Love"
18. "Butterfly"
19. "Without You"
20. "Hero"
21. "Butterfly Reprise" (Outro)

Notes:

- "Babydoll" was performed in Tokyo.
- "Vanishing" was performed in the second Sydney show.
- "Without You" was not performed in Tokyo and Melbourne.
- "All I Want for Christmas Is You" was performed as an encore in Tokyo.
- "Whenever You Call" was performed in Perth, Brisbane, Taipei, first Sydney show and Honolulu.
- "Breakdown" was not performed the first night in Tokyo.
- Olivia Newton-John joined Carey during the performance of "Hopelessly Devoted to You" on the Melbourne show.

== Shows ==
List of concerts, showing date, city, country, and venue
Date	City	Country	Venue
Asia
January 11, 1998	Tokyo	Japan	Tokyo Dome
January 14, 1998	Tokyo	Japan	Tokyo Dome
January 17, 1998	Tokyo	Japan	Tokyo Dome
January 20, 1998	Tokyo	Japan	Tokyo Dome
January 24, 1998	Taipei	Taiwan	Taipei Municipal Stadium
Australia
January 31, 1998	Brisbane	Australia	Brisbane Entertainment Centre
February 2, 1998	Sydney	Australia	Sydney Entertainment Centre
February 6, 1998	Sydney	Australia	Sydney Entertainment Centre
February 10, 1998	Perth	Australia	Burswood Dome
February 13, 1998	Melbourne	Australia	Centre Court
North America
February 21, 1998	Honolulu	United States	Aloha Stadium

=== Cancelled shows ===
List of cancelled concerts, showing date, city, country, venue and reason for cancellation
Date	City	Country	Venue	Reason
January 30, 1998	Auckland	New Zealand	Ericsson Stadium	Venue not weather-proof
February 16, 1998	Melbourne	Australia	Centre Court	—N/a

== Box office score data ==
List of concerts, showing venue, city, tickets sold, number of available tickets and amount of gross revenue
Venue	City	Attendance / Capacity	Revenue
Tokyo Dome	Tokyo	200,000 / 200,000	—N/a
Taipei Municipal Stadium	Taipei	35,000 / ?	—N/a
Aloha Stadium	Honolulu	30,415 / 30,415	$1,744,210
Total		230,415 / 230,415 (100%)	$1,744,210

== Personnel ==
- Randy Jackson – musical director, bass
- Eric Daniels – keyboards
- Andrew Sherman – keyboards
- Vernon Black – guitar
- Gregory "Gigi" Gonoway – drums
- Marquinho Brasil – percussion
- Melonie Daniels – background vocals
- Deborah Cooper – background vocals
- Mary Ann Tatum – background vocals
- Sherry McGhee – background vocals
- Nicol Richards – background vocals
- Trey Lorenz – special guest vocalist

== Works cited ==
- Nickson, Chris (1998). Mariah Carey revisited: her story. St. Martin's Press. ISBN 978-0-312-19512-0.
- Shapiro, Marc (2001). Mariah Carey: The Unauthorized Biography. ECW Press. ISBN 978-1-55022-444-3.
