= DJ Grego =

Brazilian DJs and record producer

Ippocratis Bournellis, or DJ Grego (February 7, 1956 – September 16, 2010) was a DJ and producer from São Paulo, Brazil.

== Biography ==
He began his career in São Paulo, Brazil, and was active in the world's dance scene. His first record, Maestro Mecanico, was released in 1977. His work includes over 200 remixes, signed by major labels all over the world. He worked with soul, disco and funk bounce with the Brazilian rhythm school to produce interesting and unique sounds. Many of these 12" records and CDs are rare and limited DJ exclusive editions.

DJ Grego produced remixes for many acclaimed musicians, including Mariah Carey, Jorge Benjor, Ricky Martin, Earth Wind & Fire, Gilberto Gil, Wyclef Jean, Christian Castro, Ivan Lins, Fat Boy Slim, Fey, Djavan, Emmanuel, Joao Bosco, Daniela Mercury, Information Society, Tom Jobim Lounge, Nicole da Silva, Simply Red, and Carlinhos Brown.

Ultimate Latin Grooves was his first worldwide independent project, and had Fusion, Spiritual, World, Afro, Latin, Brazilian and Tribal Batukadas influences. The project was programmed and recorded in Miami, Rio de Janeiro, São Paulo, New York and Bahia. On this CD, Greek influence came into play as well as ideas he had gained during his visits to Mediterranean clubs and bars of the Aegean islands in the summer.

He died at 54 years old, on September 16, 2010, of heart failure.
