= Butterfly (Mariah Carey song) =

1997 single by Mariah Carey

Single by Mariah Carey

from the album Butterfly
- B-side: "Fly Away" (Butterfly Reprise)
- Released: September 1997
- Recorded: 1997
- Studio: Compass Point (The Bahamas): Crave (New York); WallyWorld (California); The Hit Factory (New York City)
- Genre: Pop; gospel; R&B
- Length: 4:34
- Label: Columbia
- Composers: Mariah Carey; Walter Afanasieff
- Lyricist: Mariah Carey
- Producers: Mariah Carey; Walter Afanasieff

Mariah Carey singles chronology
"Honey" (1997)	"Butterfly" (1997)	"Breakdown" (1998)

Music video
- "Butterfly" on YouTube

"Butterfly" is a song recorded by American singer Mariah Carey for her sixth studio album, Butterfly (1997). Columbia Records released it as the second single from the album in September 1997. It was co-written by Walter Afanasieff and Carey; its lyrics reflect what the singer wished her then husband, record executive Tommy Mottola, had told her amid their separation. Carey and Afanasieff also co-produced the song, which features keyboards, synthesizers, and programmed drums. She adopts a restrained vocal style that gradually evolves from whispers at the beginning to chest voice near its conclusion. A pop, gospel, and R&B ballad, "Butterfly" was originally conceived as the house record "Fly Away". Carey co-produced the latter with David Morales; it appears on both the album and as the single's B-side.

Critics considered "Butterfly" one of the album's best songs and one of Carey's premier vocal performances. It received a nomination for Best Female Pop Vocal Performance at the 1998 Grammy Awards. A moderate success on music charts worldwide, "Butterfly" peaked within the top ten in Taiwan and on radio airplay charts in Croatia and Spain. It reached number sixteen on Hot 100 Airplay in the United States, Carey's worst performance on the chart at the time. In the United Kingdom, "Butterfly" peaked at number twenty-two and ended her streak of twelve consecutive top ten singles dating to 1992.

Carey directed the song's music video with Daniel Pearl. It depicts her escaping a house and interacting with horses. She performed "Butterfly" live on American television programs such as The Oprah Winfrey Show, Saturday Night Live, and the Late Show with David Letterman. In 1998, she sang it during the Butterfly World Tour. "Butterfly" is ranked high in retrospective lists ranking Carey's songs. It appears on her compilation albums Greatest Hits (2001) and The Ballads (2008).

== Background and release ==
Carey concluded her successful Daydream World Tour in June 1996. After returning to the United States, she began contemplating her future and conceptualizing the follow-up to her 1995 album Daydream. Her marriage with Tommy Mottola, the head of her record label Columbia, was a constant struggle at the time due to personal and professional differences. Mottola wrote a note to Carey at their home one day with the lyrics "Butterflies are free to fly / Fly away" from the 1975 Elton John song "Someone Saved My Life Tonight". While Carey separated from Mottola and left their home in December 1996, a melody and the words "Don't be afraid to fly / Spread your wings / Open up the door" came into her mind and formed the basis of the song "Fly Away". Initially conceived as a house track, "Fly Away" became the ballad, "Butterfly", upon further reflection. She subsequently completed "Fly Away" as it was originally envisioned, and subtitled it "Butterfly Reprise".

Carey began recording the songs for her new album in January 1997 and named the record Butterfly due to the significance of "Butterfly". The latter appears as the second song on the album while "Fly Away" is the penultimate track and acts as an interlude between "Whenever You Call" and "The Beautiful Ones". By June 1997, "Butterfly" was scheduled to be released as the album's lead single. After instead issuing "Honey" in July, Columbia released "Butterfly" to American radio stations in September, the same week the album was released in the country. It acted as the second single from Butterfly and was serviced to a variety of formats, including adult contemporary and urban contemporary radio stations. Billboard commentator Geoff Mayfield considered a strong performance from the song crucial to improve the album's commercial viability.

Citing continued sales of "Honey", Columbia did not release "Butterfly" to retail outlets in the United States. It issued the single as a cassette and two CDs in the United Kingdom on November 24, 1997. A mini CD single followed in Japan on November 27, 1997. "Fly Away" appeared as the song's B-side and on the 1998 maxi single and 12-inch vinyl formats of "My All", the album's fifth single. "Butterfly" was later included on Carey's compilation albums Greatest Hits (2001) and The Ballads (2008). Columbia and Legacy Recordings released a digital extended play as part of the MC30 promotional campaign marking three decades of Carey's career on August 28, 2020.

== Composition ==
=== Music ===
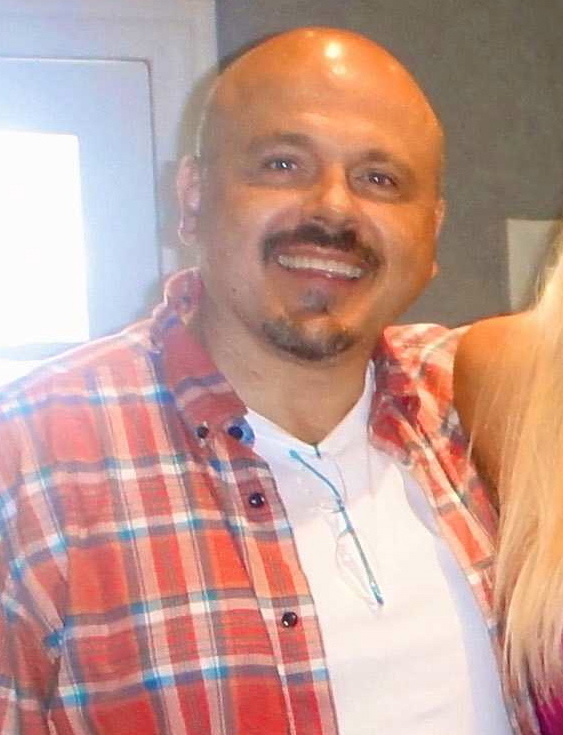
Carey produced "Butterfly" with Walter Afanasieff (pictured in 2011).

"Butterfly" is a pop, gospel, and R&B ballad. It lasts for four minutes and thirty-four seconds and has a slow tempo. Carey wrote the lyrics herself and composed the music with her longtime collaborator Walter Afanasieff. Recording primarily occurred at Compass Point Studios in The Bahamas, with additional work in New York at Crave Studios and The Hit Factory, and in California at WallyWorld. Dana Jon Chappelle, Mike Scott, and David Gleeson engineered the song with assistance from Ian Dalsemer and Oliver "Wiz" Bone. It features keyboards, synthesizers, and programming from Afanasieff, as well as additional keyboards, programmed drums, and electronic sound design from Dan Shea. The piano features prominently. After Carey and Afanasieff produced the track, Mick Guzauski mixed it at Crave and Bob Ludwig mastered it at Gateway Mastering in Portland, Maine. DJ Grego, DJ Memê, and Amorphous subsequently produced various remixes.

Critics perceived the production as elaborate. (Note: Such as David Browne of Entertainment Weekly, Gary Graff of the San Francisco Chronicle, and Gerald Poindexter of The San Diego Union-Tribune) J. D. Considine of The Baltimore Sun said "it has all the touchstones of R&B tradition – softly tinkling piano, a slow-boil rhythm arrangement and gospel-schooled harmonies on the chorus". Although Carey described "Butterfly" as unlike any of her past collaborations with Afanasieff, critics described it as similar to their previous work. (Note: Such as those from Billboard, Music Week, and Steve Jones of USA Today) Authors Andrew Chan and Tom Reynolds considered the composition characteristic of Carey's ballads. According to Alex Petridis of The Guardian, the song could have easily been released earlier in the decade. Biographer Chris Nickson summarized it instead as "richer, sexier, more grounded in the R&B she loved".

=== Lyrics ===
The lyrics of "Butterfly" are structured in two verses, a bridge, and a chorus that repeats four times. Flying acts as a metaphor for freedom and is materialized via the butterfly, "a delicate symbol of beauty" according to Neil Strauss of The New York Times. Critics viewed the song as having a positive (Note: Such as Jon Pareles of The New York Times, LLoyd Sachs of the Chicago Sun-Times, and Neil Strauss of The New York Times) and inspirational tone. (Note: Such as Jon O'Brien of Billboard, Kevin O'Hare of the Sunday Republican, and Melissa Ruggieri of the Richmond Times-Dispatch) For Billboard's Samantha Xu and The Plain Dealer's John Soeder, "Butterfly" helps emotionally process the act of adapting in life. Newfound personal autonomy was viewed as a lyrical theme; (Note: By those from Billboard, Connie Johnson of the Los Angeles Times, and Anthony Violanti of The Buffalo News, among others) Lindsey Dobbins dubbed it the "Mariah Carey Declaration of Independence" in Vulture. Entertainment Weekly's David Browne and the Gavin Report's Annette M. Lai said it utilizes the adage of loving someone enough to let them go. Others deemed it a derivative of the 1985 Sting song "If You Love Somebody Set Them Free". (Note: Attributed to Michael Corcoran of the Austin American-Statesman, Timothy Finn of the Kansas City Star, and John Soeder of The Plain Dealer)

Critics related "Butterfly" to Carey and Mottola's separation. (Note: Such as Connie Johnson of the Los Angeles Times, John Lyons of the Winnipeg Free Press, and Sonia Murray of The Atlanta Journal-Constitution) The lyrics "Blindly I imagined I could / Keep you under glass" received particular commentary. In The Village Voice, Michael Musto considered them evidence that Carey "casts herself as the oppressor" in the relationship. For Peter Piatkowski of PopMatters, the line instead demonstrates how Carey feels she was suppressed. Rich Juzwiak from Slant Magazine likened the lyrics to Stockholm syndrome wherein Carey shows empathy for Mottola despite his actions toward her. According to Richmond Times-Dispatch writer Melissa Ruggieri, they show how "Carey unabashedly acknowledges her crumbled marriage and its ensuing effect on her psyche". Others were less convinced the song was specifically about their relationship. (Note: Such as Richard Harrington of The Washington Post, Charlie Martin of the Catholic News Service, and Gerald Martinez of the New Straits Times)

Carey has discussed the track's meaning on several occasions. Upon the album's release, she considered it "a song of strength, about being strong enough to recognize when a situation is not right and having the power within yourself to let that go". In 2003, she described it as "a wish list of things I hoped somebody would say to me, but I wrote it as though I were talking to someone else". Carey specified in 2007 that she wrote the song from Mottola's perspective and included what she wished he would have said and done before she decided to divorce.

=== Vocals ===
"Butterfly"
Critics thought Carey used a restrained vocal style on "Butterfly". (Note: Such as J. D. Considine of The Baltimore Sun, Melissa Ruggieri of the Richmond Times-Dispatch, and Sonia Murray of The Atlanta Journal-Constitution)

Critics considered Carey's vocals restrained. She uses, for the first time in her career, a whisper style that is high in pitch yet soft in sound on "Butterfly". Carey transitions to falsetto in the second verse and uses chest voice from the bridge onward. Mark Marymont of the Springfield News-Leader thought the song showcases "her stylized vocal pyrotechnics". According to Xu, her vocal performance has the effect of progressing from a sense of fragility to stability. Carey credited her vocal delivery to recording in the Bahamas: "It was all about the whole freedom of the feeling of being there. That style of singing is really about what comes out of your mouth at the time. It can only come from being inspired."

"Butterfly" features background vocals from Carey, Melonie Daniels, and Mary Ann Tatum. The latter two belt the chorus lyrics, "Spread your wings and prepare to fly / For you have become a butterfly", which Billboard classified as a chant. In the Philadelphia Daily News, Jonathan Takiff thought Carey's background vocals were reminiscent of the 1939 song "And the Angels Sing". Considine said they are heard "floating above the main theme like wisps of smoke over a chimney".

=== "Fly Away" (Butterfly Reprise) ===
Three minutes and forty-nine seconds in length, "Fly Away" (Butterfly Reprise) was described by critics as a dance, disco, house, and deep house version of "Butterfly". Carey co-produced the song and composed its music with David Morales, whom she had previously collaborated with on the remix to "Fantasy" (1995). Morales and Satoshi Tomiie added additional production, and Peter "Ski" Schwartz played the keyboards. Elton John and Bernie Taupin are credited as lyricists along with Carey due to the inclusion of words from the song "Someone Saved My Life Tonight". Dave "EQ3" Sussman and Dana Jon Chappelle engineered "Fly Away" with assistance from Ann Mincielli. In New York City, Morales mixed it at Quad Studios and Herb Powers Jr. mastered it at Powers House of Sound.

Eric Henderson of Slant Magazine described "Fly Away" as a "jazzy, dubby" track. Writing in Camera Obscura, English professor Hiram Perez said the composition was influenced by loops heard in hip hop music. He summarized it as "an anthemlike mix of throbbing percussion, disco, and gospel, all combining to invoke a lexicon of gay musical sounds". Background vocals feature prominently throughout the song; in addition to Carey, they are provided by Mary Ann Tatum and Melonie Daniels. Carey sings in the whistle register on them, one of the few such occasions on Butterfly. Her vocal delivery also includes runs and ad-libs. Muzik writer Seamus Haji viewed the song as a vocal showcase for her.

== Critical reception ==
Music critics considered "Butterfly" one of the album's best songs. (Note: Attributed to Preezy Brown of Vibe, A. M. Jamison of the Dayton Daily News, and Paul Taylor of the Manchester Evening News) It has appeared high in ratings of Carey's musical output. Among her best singles, "Butterfly" has been ranked at number twenty-five (The Guardian), number twenty-two (Cleveland.com), and number five (Vulture). On lists of her best songs, it was placed at number fifty-nine (Billboard), within the top ten (Entertainment Weekly), and at number two (Gay Times).

The lyrics received mixed reviews. Billboard contributors considered them advanced and Michael Corcoran of the Austin American-Statesman and J. Freedom du Lac of The Sacramento Bee viewed them as underdeveloped. In the Waco Tribune-Herald, Grey Cavitt called the butterfly theme "a thin, flimsy greeting card to build a song". Piatkowski perceived the metaphor instead as a genuine depiction of Carey's experiences. The music also received varied opinions. Lai and Buffalo News writer Anthony Violanti described the production as powerful; Marymont and Reynolds thought it was overpowering. In the San Francisco Chronicle, Gary Graff deemed the song an example of Carey's "cloyingly torchy material". Writing for The Washington Post, Richard Harrington said it allowed her vocals to excel.

Critics called Carey's vocal performance one of the best of her career. (Note: Attributed to Stephen Thomas Erlewine of AllMusic, Kevin Howard of The Chronicle, and Rich Juzwiak of Slant Magazine) The restrained style of her voice received positive commentary. Music Week wrote: "No longer over-singing for the sake of it, Carey has rarely sounded more stunning." Considine considered it in alignment with butterflies' "fragility and grace"; Sonia Murray of The Atlanta Journal-Constitution suggested it was evidence of artistic advancement. According to USA Today critic Steve Jones, "Butterfly" serves as an impressive vocal showcase for Carey. Differing in The Star-Ledger, Jay Lustig thought her voice overshadows the song's message. "Butterfly" was nominated in the Best Female Pop Vocal Performance category at the 1998 Grammy Awards but lost to Sarah McLachlan's "Building a Mystery".

"Fly Away" received critical commentary regarding its placement on Butterfly. Cavitt and Carol Nader of The Age questioned its inclusion due to the prior appearance of "Butterfly". Vibe's Preezy Brown thought it rivaled the quality of many tracks despite being shorter in length. Billboard writer Jon O'Brien said it "is such a convincing diversion you wish Carey would commit to a whole album full of similar bangers".

== Commercial performance ==
Critics predicted "Butterfly" would become commercially successful. (Note: Such as Gerald Martinez of the New Straits Times, Gerald Poindexter of The San Diego Union-Tribune, and Dave Sholin of the Gavin Report) As it lacked a retail release in the United States, "Butterfly" was ineligible to appear on the Billboard Hot 100. The song instead peaked at number sixteen on the Hot 100 Airplay component chart. It was Carey's lowest-peaking entry of her career on the list at the time. Similarly on Hot R&B Airplay, "Butterfly" reached number twenty-seven and became her third-lowest charting appearance. It was her ninth song to reach the top ten of Rhythmic Top 40, which ranks tracks played by rhythmic contemporary radio stations. According to Gold Derby writer Daniel Montgomery, the number eleven peak on Adult Contemporary is the song's most notable chart performance in the country.

"Butterfly" performed moderately on music charts worldwide. It reached the top ten on the Taiwan sales chart (number nine) and on airplay charts in Croatia (three) and Spain (four). In New Zealand, the song topped out at number fifteen. It reached the top twenty on Italian (thirteen), French (fourteen), and British (fifteen) airplay charts. In Canada, the track peaked at number twenty-two on the airplay chart. "Butterfly" debuted at its best position in the United Kingdom of number twenty-two. It ended Carey's streak of twelve consecutive top ten singles dating to "I'll Be There" in 1992. According to The Pink Paper writer Richard Drew, the song got "lost in the Christmas shuffle" in the country. Elsewhere, "Butterfly" entered the top forty in Sweden (twenty-four) and Australia (twenty-seven). Reflecting on the song's limited commercial performance, Carey stated in 2024: "I loved it and I think a lot of my die-hard fans loved it and it really was meaningful".

"Fly Away" appeared on British and American dance music charts. It peaked at number twenty-five with "The Roof" on the UK Record Mirror Club Chart published by Music Week. "Fly Away" reached number thirteen on Billboard Hot Dance Club Play in the United States, her third-lowest peak on the chart at the time. It was far more successful on Hot Dance Maxi-Singles Sales. With "My All", the song topped the list for two months and remained on the chart for almost two years – her longest-charting title. The single was the second-best performing on the chart in 1998 and ranked at number twenty-eight in 1999.

== Music video and performances ==
Carey directed the song's music video with Daniel Pearl. It was partially inspired by a melatonin-induced dream Carey experienced in which she cut her finger on a fence while chasing something that jumped over it and was unable to keep up. She worked with acting coach Sheila Gray to develop the storyline. Gray described Carey's persona as a departure from the past because it is "really soulful in a way that's going to be exciting for people to see". The video opens with Carey posing like Caroll Baker in the Tennessee Williams film Baby Doll (1956), which depicts the marriage between a young woman and an older man. She is later seen being spied on through a peephole, escaping a mansion, and interacting with ponies.

Columbia released the video in 1997 and later included it as a bonus on Carey's 1999 video album Around the World. According to Piatkowski, "intriguing shots with her singing on a landing, the light casting large shadows of the spindles which throw vertical bars across Carey's face" symbolize a yearning for personal independence. Emmanuel Hapsis of KQED perceived the production as peculiar due to the peephole and shots of horses. Writing for BET, Jon Reyes said it "almost reads like a love letter to a horse that should have been set free".

Carey performed "Butterfly" on several occasions. In 1997, she sang it on American television programs such as The Oprah Winfrey Show, Saturday Night Live, and the Late Show with David Letterman. Rolling Stone named the latter one of the best performances of her career. In 2022, it was included on the 25th anniversary edition of Butterfly. Carey also performed the song during her 1998 Butterfly World Tour. For the 2024 Celebration of Mimi concert residency, she sang it as part of a medley of Butterfly songs.

== Track listings ==
- Cassette single, CD single
- 1. "Butterfly" – 4:34
- 2. "Fly Away" (Butterfly Reprise) – 3:49
- CD maxi single 1
- 3. "Fly Away" (Butterfly Reprise) (Fly Away Club Mix) – 9:52
- 4. "Fly Away" (Butterfly Reprise) (Def 'B' Fly Mix) – 8:46
- CD maxi single 2, cassette maxi single

5. "Honey" (Morales Dub) – 7:34

- CD maxi single 3

4. "The Roof" (Mobb Deep Mix) – 5:31

- CD maxi single 4
- 2. "One Sweet Day" (Live) – 5:08
- 3. "Hero" (Spanish Version) – 4:16
- 4. "Without You" – 3:34
- Mini CD single
- 2. "The Roof" – 5:14
- 3. "The Roof" (Mobb Deep Mix) – 5:31
- 12-inch vinyl single

A1. "Fly Away" (Butterfly Reprise) (Fly Away Club Mix) – 9:52
A2. "Fly Away" (Butterfly Reprise) (Def 'B' Fly Mix) – 8:46
B1. "Fly Away" (Butterfly Reprise) – 3:49
B2. "Butterfly" – 4:34

- Digital EP
1. "Fly Away" (Butterfly Reprise) (Fly Away Club Mix) – 9:50
2. "Fly Away" (Butterfly Reprise) (Def 'B' Fly Mix) – 8:40
3. "Butterfly" (Meme Club Radio) – 4:17
4. "Butterfly" (Meme's Extended Club Mix Part 1 & 2) – 8:41
5. "Butterfly" (Meme Latin Beats) – 5:57
6. "Butterfly" (Sambaterfly Edit) – 4:35
7. "Butterfly" (Sambaterfly for Clubbers) – 8:20
8. "Butterfly" (Classic Bossa Nova) – 4:10
9. "Butterfly" (Meme's Instrumental) – 8:40
10. "Butterfly" (Meme's Radio Instrumental) – 4:18

== Credits and personnel ==
=== A-side: "Butterfly" ===
Recording

- Recorded at Compass Point Studios, The Bahamas; Crave Studios, New York; WallyWorld, California; The Hit Factory, New York City
- Mixed at Crave Studios, New York; The Hit Factory; New York City
- Mastered at Gateway Mastering, Portland, Maine

Personnel

- Mariah Carey – Lyricist, music, producer, arranger, lead vocals, background vocals
- Walter Afanasieff – music, producer, arranger, keyboards, synthesizers, programming
- Melonie Daniels, Mary Ann Tatum – background vocals
- Dan Shea – additional keyboards, drum and rhythm programming, sound design and computer programming
- Dana Jon Chappelle, Mike Scott, David Gleeson – engineering
- Ian Dalsemer, Oliver "Wiz" Bone – assistant engineering
- Mick Guzauski – mixing
- Bob Ludwig – mastering

=== B-side: "Fly Away" (Butterfly Reprise) ===
Recording

- Mixed at Quad Studios, New York City
- Mastered at Powers House of Sound, New York City

Personnel

- Mariah Carey – lyrics, music, co-producer, lead vocals, background vocals
- Elton John, Bernie Taupin – lyrics
- David Morales – music, co-producer, arranger, additional producer, mixing
- Melonie Daniels, Mary Ann Tatum – background vocals
- Peter "Ski" Schwartz – keyboards
- Satoshi Tomiie – arranger, additional producer
- Dave "EQ3" Sussman, Dana Jon Chappelle – engineering
- Ann Mincielli – assistant engineering
- Herb Powers Jr. – mastering

== Charts ==
=== Weekly charts ===
1997–1998 weekly chart performance
Chart (Publisher)	Peak position
Australia Singles (ARIA)	27
Belgium Ultratip Bubbling Under Flanders (Ultratop)	5
Canada Hit Tracks (RPM)	22
Canada Adult Contemporary Tracks (RPM)	23
Canada Contemporary Hit Radio (BDS)	16
Croatia International Airplay (HRT)	3
Europe Hot 100 Singles (Music & Media)	61
Europe Airplay (Music & Media)	15
France Singles (SNEP)	43
France Airplay (SNEP)	14
Germany Singles (Media Control)	76
Italy Airplay (Music & Media)	13
Netherlands Tipparade (Stichting Nederlandse Top 40)	6
Netherlands Single Top 100 (Dutch Charts)	52
New Zealand Singles (RIANZ)	15
Scotland Singles (CIN)	36
Spain Airplay (Music & Media)	4
Sweden Topplistan (GLF)	24
Taiwan Singles (IFPI)	9
UK Singles (CIN)	22
UK R&B Singles (CIN)	5
UK Club (Music Week)	25 (Note: "Fly Away" (Butterfly Reprise) David Morales & Satoshi Tomiie mixes; with "The Roof" (Mobb Deep mix))
UK Airplay (Music & Media)	15
UK Airplay (Music Control)	72
US Hot 100 Airplay (Billboard)	16
US Adult Contemporary (Billboard)	11
US Adult Pop Airplay (Billboard)	35
US Crossover (Billboard)	22
US Hot Dance Club Play (Billboard)	13 (Note: "Fly Away" (Butterfly Reprise))
US Hot Dance Maxi-Singles Sales (Billboard)	1 (Note: "Fly Away" (Butterfly Reprise); with "My All")
US Hot R&B Airplay (Billboard)	27
US Pop Airplay (Billboard)	14
US Rhythmic Top 40 (Billboard)	8
US Tropical/Salsa (Billboard)	19
US Adult Contemporary (Gavin Report)	6
US Hot AC (Gavin Report)	16
US Top 40 (Gavin Report)	9
US Urban (Gavin Report)	6
US Adult Contemporary (Radio & Records)	10
US CHR/Pop (Radio & Records)	12
US CHR/Rhythmic (Radio & Records)	8
US Hot AC (Radio & Records)	22
US Urban (Radio & Records)	9
US Urban AC (Radio & Records)	6

=== Year-end charts ===
1997 year-end chart performance
Chart (Publisher)	Position
Canada Adult Contemporary Tracks (RPM)	89
US Mainstream Top 40 (Billboard)	88
US Rhythmic (Billboard)	75
US Adult Contemporary (Radio & Records)	51
US CHR/Pop (Radio & Records)	75
US CHR/Rhythmic (Radio & Records)	80
US Urban AC (Radio & Records)	94

1998 year-end chart performance
Chart (Publisher)	Position
US Adult R&B Songs (Billboard)	29
US Hot Dance Maxi-Singles Sales (Billboard)	2
US Adult Contemporary (Radio & Records)	80
US Urban AC (Radio & Records)	70

1999 year-end chart performance
Chart (Publisher)	Position
US Hot Dance Maxi-Singles Sales (Billboard)	28
