= Honey (Mariah Carey song) =

1997 single by Mariah Carey

Single by Mariah Carey

from the album Butterfly
- B-side: "Honey" (Bad Boy Remix)
- Released: July 29, 1997
- Recorded: February 1997
- Studio: The Hit Factory (New York City)
- Genre: R&B; pop; hip-hop
- Length: 5:00
- Label: Columbia
- Composers: Mariah Carey; Sean Combs; Kamaal Fareed; Steven Jordan; Stephen Hague; Bobby Robinson; Ronald Larkins; Larry Price; Malcolm McLaren
- Lyricist: Mariah Carey
- Producers: Mariah Carey; The Ummah; Stevie J; Sean "Puffy" Combs

Mariah Carey singles chronology
"Forever" (1996)	"Honey" (1997)	"Butterfly" (1997)

Music videos
- "Honey" on YouTube; "Honey" (Bad Boy remix) on YouTube

"Honey" is a song by American singer-songwriter Mariah Carey from her sixth studio album, Butterfly (1997). It was released as the lead single from Butterfly on July 29, 1997, by Columbia Records. The song was written and produced by Carey, Sean Combs, Kamaal "Q-Tip" Fareed and Steven "Stevie J" Jordan. The song samples "Hey DJ" by The World's Famous Supreme Team and "The Body Rock" by the Treacherous Three. "Honey" was a redefining song in Carey's career, pushing her further into the hip hop scene.

"Honey" was acclaimed by music critics, who called Carey's musical transition "genuine". "Honey" was successful in the United States, becoming Carey's third single to debut atop the Billboard Hot 100, setting the record for most singles to debut at number one, a record she held for 23 years, until it was broken by Ariana Grande. It stayed at number one for three consecutive weeks. "Honey" also topped the charts in Canada, Croatia, Estonia and Israel, and reached the top-ten in Australia, New Zealand, Hungary, Spain, Sweden and the United Kingdom. The song was nominated in two categories at the 40th Annual Grammy Awards, for Best Female R&B Vocal Performance and Best R&B Song. Carey included the song in the setlist of various live shows and future tours, where she would sing both the original and remix versions.

"Honey" is well known for its accompanying music video, which presented a more suggestive and less conservative image of Carey than had been previously seen. The video features Carey being held hostage in a mansion, which she escapes in a James Bond–themed plot. Subsequent scenes see Carey escaping her assailants on a watercraft, dancing aboard a ship with sailors and frolicking on a beautiful island with her lover. The video garnered much coverage, as many comparisons were made between the video and the rumors of Carey's failing marriage. While Carey denied the comparisons were anything more than coincidence, many close friends including Walter Afanasieff, Carey's long-time writing partner, felt they were more than obvious.

== Background and recording ==
After the success of her urban crossover album Daydream, Carey began exerting more control over the creative aspects of her career. In doing so, she began pursuing a more hip-hop oriented sound, something very different from anything she had recorded previously. She was still writing ballads with Afanasieff, but began looking for more hip-hop/R&B producers to helm part of her new project. Carey began working on the song, recorded in February 1997, with Q-Tip. They brought the lyrics, samples and melody over to Puff Daddy who, as a producer, had just earned his second number-one single on the Billboard Hot 100 with "Mo Money Mo Problems." In an interview with DJ Suss One's The Feature Presentation, Mariah Carey revealed that the remix of her song "Honey," which ultimately featured Mase and The LOX, was originally intended to include The Notorious B.I.G. prior to his death. Due to reports of Puffy's overbearing nature, Carey recorded her vocals separately, until she gave him a few demos to choose from. Puffy explained why Carey recorded her vocals separately, and his feelings regarding having worked with her:

A lot of people feel I'm overbearing, so I wasn't allowed in the studio when she did her vocals. I'm trying to work on that, I'm such a perfectionist, sometimes I don't give people the chance to breathe. So I've been banned from a lot of studios. Mariah [recorded "Honey"] until she thought it was perfect, like a hundred times. She gave me like a hundred tracks to choose from.

Puffy expressed his respect for Carey and her craft, mentioning that she re-did her vocals many times until she felt they were perfect. After they had the vocals, Carey and Puffy began working on the song's hook and incorporating the music samples and blending them into the bridge and chorus. After the song was completed, Combs was very confident with the song, calling it "slammin'," but because of its heavy hip-hop influence, he felt only cautiously optimistic about the song's commercial success. On a more personal note, "Honey" served as Carey's first single after her separation from estranged husband, Tommy Mottola, who also lead her current record label, Columbia Records.

== Composition ==
"Honey"
A 31-second sample of the song that led Carey into a hip-hop and R&B influence, and became her twelfth number-one single on the Billboard Hot 100 chart.

"Honey" is an up-tempo song, that blends hip hop and R&B genres. The song is set in the signature common time, and is written in the key of E♭ major. It features a basic chord progression of A♭-F♭-1. Carey's vocal range in the song spans from the low note of C_{3} to the high note of B♭_{5}; with the piano and guitar pieces ranging from G♭_{3} to G♭_{5}. The track was very different from anything Carey had ever recorded, and was described as "street Hip-Hop music, with a booming bass." The song's melody was driven by Q-Tip's drum programming and Stevie J's keyboard notes. Combs's production gave the song a "light and airy" effect, further distancing it from Carey's contemporary sound. "Honey" is built around a bassline sample from Treacherous Three's "The Body Rock" and a piano motif reprised from "Hey DJ" by The World's Famous Supreme Team. The track united hip-hop and R&B with traces of pop music and was described as a "[song with a] catchy chorus, combining hip-hop and R&B into something that simply wasn't going to be denied by anyone, and offering a powerful start to a record." According to author Chris Nickson, "Honey" revealed a more confident and independent side to Carey that had never been presented in her previous work. The song truly embodied a more mature and confident woman, with sultrier lyrics and a thumping hip-hop beat to accompany it.

The song's Bad Boy Remix features rap leads from Jadakiss and Styles P of The LOX (Sheek Louch, the third member, appears in the music video) and Mase, with some vocals rapped by Combs himself. The song's So So Def Remix features rap leads from Jermaine Dupri and Da Brat.

== Critical reception ==
Professional ratings
Review scores
Source	Rating
AllMusic	2.5/5 stars
Music Week	3/5
Peterborough Herald & Post	3/5
Stereogum	7/10

"Honey" garnered acclaimed response from contemporary music critics. David Browne from Entertainment Weekly described the importance the song held for Carey's musical transition. He wrote "You're prepared for a song on which Carey finally breaks free of her adult-contemporary chains and gets down." He felt "Honey" sounded as "anyone striking out on his or her own — caught between old and new habits and taking cautious baby steps into the future." Browne also commented that Carey showed a commendable vocal restraint in the song, "showing some admirable restraint, she nestles herself into the downy-soft beats of "Honey." Author Chris Nickson felt the single's importance was "well beyond its chart placing" and that the single was one of the most important songs in Carey's career, enabling her to transition into R&B and hip-hop. Nickson commented that before, Carey was seen as a pop singer with R&B tendencies, but "Honey" changed that idea, giving the singer "hip-hop credibility", and forced naysayers to "take another look." Rich Juzwiak from Slant complimented the song, calling it "awakening, both sensually and musically." Juzwiak concluded the review writing ""Honey" exemplifies the abrupt gear shifting that appreciating Mariah the artist requires. Its new pop brilliance doesn't always come easy, where detecting it depends on the audience's newfound ability to apply Carey's pop life to her pop music." "Honey" was nominated for two Grammy Awards at the 1998 ceremony, for Best Female R&B Vocal Performance and Best R&B Song. Additionally, the song won the BMI Pop Award for "Songwriter."

=== Accolades ===
Accolades for "Honey"
Publication	Accolade	Rank	Ref.
Bustle	The 49 Best Pop Songs Of The '90s	46	

== Chart performance ==
"Honey" was Carey's third single to debut atop the Billboard Hot 100. Additionally, the song became her 12th chart-topper, breaking the fifth place record she had shared with Madonna and Whitney Houston. It replaced "Mo Money Mo Problems" by The Notorious B.I.G. featuring Puff Daddy and Mase, and it was replaced by Boyz II Men's "4 Seasons of Loneliness". At this point, Carey was tied with The Supremes for fourth most US number ones, behind Michael Jackson with thirteen, and Elvis Presley and The Beatles with 17 and 20, respectively. "Honey" was certified double-platinum by the Recording Industry Association of America (RIAA), denoting shipments of over two million units. The song stalled at number two on the Hot R&B/Hip-Hop Songs (behind "You Make Me Wanna..." by Usher), spending 22 weeks in the chart. "Honey" finished number 32 on the Billboard end of year chart for 1997. In Canada, the song debuted on the RPM Singles Chart at forty-eight on the RPM issue dated August 18, 1997, and reached the top of the chart on September 22, 1997. It was present on the chart for a total of 20 weeks, and ranked 18 on the RPM Year-end chart for 1997.

The song debuted on the UK Singles Chart on September 6, 1997, at its peak of number three, becoming Carey's 13th top ten single, and spent a total of eight weeks in the chart. "Honey" is Carey's 15th best-selling single in the United Kingdom as of 2010, with estimated sales of over 200,000. In Australia, "Honey" peaked at number eight on the charts, spending a total of 19 weeks in the chart. It was certified gold by the Australian Recording Industry Association (ARIA), denoting shipments of over 35,000 units. In New Zealand, the song peaked at number three, and stayed in the chart for 14 weeks. The song's success in most other worldwide markets was moderate, with it not reaching the same peaks as Carey's previous singles. While "Honey" peaked at number 12 in Finland, it fell dropped out of the chart the next week, spending a total of only one week in the chart. In Sweden, the song performed well, peaking at number eight and staying within the chart for ten weeks. In Austria and France, "Honey" peaked at number 39, spending one and four weeks on the charts, respectively. The song peaked at number 29 and 30 in Belgium Flanders and Wallonia.

== Music video ==
Carey exiting a swimming pool in the "Honey" music video, which became one of the most iconic moments in her videography.

Aside from the attention surrounding the song, the music video for "Honey" garnered much speculation. For the first time in her career, Carey was featured provocatively dressed, giving viewers a "taste of the freer Mariah." The video's concept was created by Carey with Paul Hunter filling in as the director. Serving a James Bond theme, Carey was cast as "the very sexy agent M", a woman who escapes a large mansion in which she has been held captive. Carey said of the video that "I don't really think the video is overtly sexual, but for me... I mean people used to think I was the nineties version of Mary Poppins!"

The video premiered on MTV and BET in August 1997 and was shot in Puerto Rico on June 27–July 1, 1997 with a $2 million budget, making it one of the most expensive music videos of all time. The video begins with Carey, playing "Agent M", being held hostage in a large mansion. The captors are played by Eddie Griffin, Frank Sivero, and Johnny Brennan of The Jerky Boys, who continue to taunt Carey over her capture and eventual death. "Agent M" speaks in Spanish to the captors, saying she cannot understand them. After a series of dialogue, Carey escapes Griffin's character and dives into a swimming pool from the mansion's roof. After an ensemble change, Carey dons a swimsuit and escapes the island via a watercraft. The video's antagonists continue their pursuit of Carey throughout a large body of water, until she arrives aboard a large ship. It is unclear if both scenes are happening separately or side by side. Throughout most of the video, Carey is seen posing on a large sailboat, while wearing a white bikini. After boarding the ship, Carey begins dancing and is soon joined by a group of male sailors. After a sequence of light dance routines, Carey is seen on an island with her lover, model David Fumero, and her real-life dog, Jack. They frolic together on the island, while Carey happily enjoys her romance.

It was a grueling process; I'm not going to say it was easy. I got up at 3 A.M. every day, and worked until 9 in the morning the next day – for four hours in a row, swimming in my Gucci pumps! I can't say that I really jumped off the roof, but [I did] dive into the pool. But I did wear and swim in those pumps, and I was not happy.

— Carey on her experience on the set of "Honey"

During the time of the video's release, Carey and Mottola were in the midst of their divorce and this led to many speculation on the video's message. Tabloids and critics were linking the video's theme to Carey's marriage, writing how Mottola would lock Carey in their mansion. While Carey denied the allegations, many found it to be very obvious. Carey's writing partner of six years, Afanasieff, felt the video was undeniably about Mottola. While speculation about the video grew, Carey continued to deny any intention of portraying her marriage in the video. In an interview, Carey said that "Tommy loves the video, he says it's my best video yet."

The song's Bad Boy remix featured a different music video as well. It features the same concept, however not emphasizing on the kidnapping and escape. The video begins with Carey diving into the pool, and driving a watercraft. As she reaches a point far into the body of water, she is offered a rope lift from a helicopter. After she accepts and ascends the line, Carey boards the aircraft alongside its pilots, Puffy and the members of Bad Boy Entertainment. Other scenes sequence Carey dancing with Puffy in a golden indoor tunnel. As the video concludes, more staff from the helicopter join Carey in the golden entryway, as they dance and enjoy themselves.

== Live performances ==
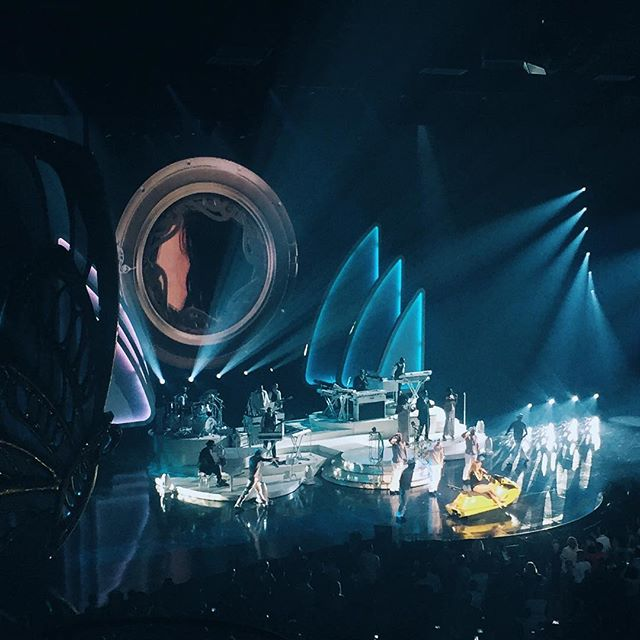
Carey performing "Honey" during her Number Ones Las Vegas residency

"Honey" was performed on various live television appearances as well as most of Carey's tours. Carey first performed a mash-up of the song and the Bad Boy remix live on the British music chart program Top of the Pops in 1997. The performance incorporated themes from both videos, in which Carey was dressed in the same white bikini from the music video. Additionally, the stage was set up to resemble the deck of a ship. Dancers similar to the video joined Carey on stage as she performed the song. Carey performed "Honey" at the 1998 World Music Awards. The performance garnered her a standing ovation, and featured many male dancers, all donning sailor costumes. After the second verse, a large projection of the Bad Boy remix video played while pre-recorded rap verses from Puffy played. A live performance of the song was taped via satellite and aired live in Japan, featuring similar costumes and themes as the others. Carey performed the song throughout her Butterfly World Tour (1998), which served as the accompanying tour for Butterfly. During her live routine of the song, various male dancers donned in similar sailor outfits joined Carey on stage. Serving as an intro to the song, Carey re-enacts the hostage from the video, and formulates her escape. The song's performance in Honolulu, Hawaii was used as the official act of the song on Carey's 1998 concert DVD, Around the World, which featured live tapings from Japan, Taiwan, Australia and the US.

For her Rainbow World Tour (2000), Carey re-enacted a similar performance than that of her previous tour, with her and her dancers wearing sailor-inspired outfits. "Honey" was performed during Carey's following tour, the Charmbracelet World Tour (2003–2004). Carey continued performing the song throughout her 2006 tour, The Adventures of Mimi. The performance did not include any video intro, but did introduce a four-piece of male dancers dressed in sailor outfits. Carey wore a pair of black leggings, accompanied by a sparkling mini-bra. During the performance in Madison Square Garden, Carey was joined with Sean "Diddy" Combs (previously known as Puffy) on stage after the second verse. During her Angels Advocate Tour (2010) performance of the song, Carey donned a sparkling mini-Herve Leger gown, with a faux-fur snug jacket. During the song, male and female dancers joined her on stage, and performed up-tempo dance routines. She performed the song regularly during The Elusive Chanteuse Show (2014), singing the So So Def Mix. She also included the song in her 2015 Las Vegas residency, Mariah Carey Number 1's, where she would enter the stage in a black leotard, riding a yellow jet ski, in homage to the video. Carey started performing "Honey" for the first time since July 2017 on her second concert residency, The Butterfly Returns (2018).

During The LOX's 2021 battle with The Diplomats (DipSet) via Timbaland and Swizz Beatz' Verzuz at the Hulu Theater at Madison Square Garden, Jadakiss performed his verse from the Bad Boy Remix of "Honey" as part of a medley. Specifically, in response to a remark from Juelz Santana after DipSet had played Cam'ron's "Oh Boy" and "Hey Ma" that The LOX had no records for female fans, The LOX performed the Bad Boy Remix of "Honey", "Ryde or Die, Bitch" featuring Eve, other remixes featuring them of Jennifer Lopez's "Jenny from the Block" and Mary J. Blige's "Family Affair" and also Sheek Louch's "Good Love" and Jadakiss' "Knock Yourself Out". Before he performed his "Honey" Bad Boy Remix verse, Jadakiss remarked, "We got Grammys! These (expletive)s (DipSet) don't know what Grammys look like, they know what grams look like!"

== Track listing and formats ==
US CD single

1. "Honey" (LP version) – 4:59
2. "Honey" (Bad Boy Remix) – 5:32

UK CD single (Part 1)

1. "Honey" (LP version) – 4:59
2. "Honey" (Bad Boy Remix) – 5:32
3. "Honey" (Smooth Version with Intro) – 5:07
4. "Honey" (So So Def Mix) – 5:13

UK CD single (Part 2)

1. "Honey" (LP version) – 4:59
2. "Honey" (Classic Mix) – 8:06
3. "Honey" (Morales Club Dub) – 11:02
4. "Honey" (Mo' Honey Dub) – 7:24
5. "Honey" (Classic Instrumental) – 7:32

Digital remixes / 2× 12-inch vinyl

1. "Honey" (Bad Boy Remix) – 5:32
2. "Honey" (So So Def Mix) – 5:11
3. "Honey" (So So Def Radio Mix) – 3:59
4. "Honey" (Smooth Version with Intro) – 5:04
5. "Honey" (Classic Mix) – 8:05
6. "Honey" (Def Club Mix) – 6:18
7. "Honey" (Morales Club Dub) – 10:58
8. "Honey" (Mo' Honey Dub) – 7:23
9. "Honey" (Morales Dub) – 7:34
10. "Honey" (Def Rascal Anthem) – 10:46
11. "Honey" (Def Rascal Dub) – 5:15
12. "Honey" (Classic Instrumental) – 7:32

== Credits and personnel ==
Credits are adapted from the Butterfly liner notes.

- Mariah Carey – vocals, songwriting, co-producing
- Sean Combs – songwriting, co-producing
- Kamaal Fareed – songwriting, co-producing
- Steven Jordan – songwriting, co-producing
- Stephen Hague – songwriting
- Bobby Robinson – songwriting
- Ronald Larkins – songwriting
- Larry Price – songwriting
- Malcolm McLaren – songwriting

== Charts ==
=== Weekly charts ===
Weekly chart performance for "Honey"
Chart (1997)	Peak position
Australia (ARIA)	8
Austria (Ö3 Austria Top 40)	39
Belgium (Ultratop 50 Flanders)	30
Belgium (Ultratop 50 Wallonia)	29
Canada (Nielsen SoundScan)	2
Canada Contemporary Hit Radio (BDS)	2
Canada Top Singles (RPM)	1
Canada Adult Contemporary (RPM)	8
Canada Dance (RPM)	1
Croatia (HRT)	1
Denmark (IFPI)	17
Estonia (Eesti Top 20)	1
European Hot 100 Singles (Music & Media)	16
Finland (Suomen virallinen lista)	12
France (SNEP)	39
Germany (GfK)	38
Hungary (MAHASZ)	5
Hungary Airplay (HCRA)	2
Iceland (Íslenski Listinn Topp 40)	26
Ireland (IRMA)	19
Israel (Israeli Singles Chart)	1
Italy (FIMI)	2
Italy Airplay (Music & Media)	1
Japan (Oricon)	39
Netherlands (Dutch Top 40)	8
Netherlands (Single Top 100)	15
New Zealand (Recorded Music NZ)	3
Scottish Singles Sales (Official Charts)	13
Spain (AFYVE)	4
Spain Airplay (Music & Media)	1
Sweden (Sverigetopplistan)	8
Switzerland (Schweizer Hitparade)	23
Taiwan (IFPI)	2
UK Singles (Official Charts)	3
UK Hip Hop/R&B (Official Charts)	2
UK Club (Music Week)	31
UK Urban Club (Music Week)	1
UK Airplay (Music & Media)	2
UK Airplay (Music Control)	5
UK Dance Airplay (Music Control)	1
US Billboard Hot 100	1
US Crossover (Billboard)	2
US Dance Club Songs (Billboard)	1
US Dance Singles Sales (Billboard)	1
US Hot Latin Songs (Billboard)	30
US Hot R&B/Hip-Hop Songs (Billboard)	2
US Pop Airplay (Billboard)	10
US Rhythmic Airplay (Billboard)	1
US Tropical Airplay (Billboard)	12

=== Year-end charts ===
Year-end chart performance for "Honey"
Chart (1997)	Position
Australia (ARIA)	50
Canada Singles (SoundScan)	13
Canada Top Singles (RPM)	18
Canada Adult Contemporary (RPM)	44
Canada Dance/Urban (RPM)	9
Europe Airplay (Music & Media)	24
Israel (Israeli Singles Chart)	15
Italy (Musica e dischi)	85
Netherlands (Dutch Top 40)	105
Netherlands (Single Top 100)	79
New Zealand (RIANZ)	18
Sweden (Topplistan)	91
UK Singles (OCC)	93
UK Urban (Music Week)	13
US Billboard Hot 100	32
US Hot R&B Singles (Billboard)	37
US Maxi-Singles Sales (Billboard)	12
US Rhythmic Top 40 (Billboard)	19
US Top 40/Mainstream (Billboard)	45
US CHR/Pop (Radio & Records)	60
US CHR/Rhythmic (Radio & Records)	19
US Urban (Radio & Records)	40
US Urban AC (Radio & Records)	35

== Certifications ==
Certifications for "Honey"
Region	Certification	Certified units/sales
Australia (ARIA)	Platinum	70,000^{‡}
Canada (Music Canada)	Gold	40,000^{‡}
Japan (RIAJ)	Gold	50,000^{^}
New Zealand (RMNZ)	Gold	15,000^{‡}
United Kingdom (BPI)	Silver	200,000^{‡}
United States (RIAA)	2× Platinum	2,000,000^{‡}
^{^} Shipments figures based on certification alone.^{‡} Sales+streaming figures based on certification alone.

== Release history ==
Release dates and formats for "Honey"
Region	Date	Format(s)	Label(s)	Ref.
United States	July 29, 1997	Contemporary hit radio; rhythmic contemporary radio	Columbia	
France	August 25, 1997	12-inch vinyl; CD	Sony Music	
United Kingdom	August 25, 1997	Cassette; maxi CD	Columbia	
Canada	August 26, 1997	12-inch vinyl	Columbia	
United States	August 26, 1997	7-inch vinyl; 12-inch vinyl; cassette; CD; maxi cassette; maxi CD	Columbia	
Japan	August 27, 1997	CD	Sony Music	
Various	August 28, 2020	Digital download; streaming (EP)	Legacy	
Canada; United States	February 17, 2023	2× 12-inch vinyl (Urban Outfitters exclusive)	Sony Music	

== See also ==
- List of Billboard Hot 100 number ones of 1997
- List of number-one dance singles of 1997 (U.S.)
