= Live at the Pearl =

2009 Mariah Carey concert residency

Live at The Pearl
- Residency by Mariah Carey
- Promotional poster for Carey's Las Vegas show
- Location: Paradise, Nevada, U.S.
- Venue: Pearl Concert Theater
- Associated album: Memoirs of an Imperfect Angel
- Start date: September 11, 2009
- End date: October 10, 2009
- No. of shows: 4

Mariah Carey concert chronology
- The Adventures of Mimi (2006); Live at the Pearl (2009); Angels Advocate Tour (2009-10)
Mariah Carey concert residency chronology
Live at the Pearl (2009)	All I Want for Christmas Is You... (2014-19)

Live at the Pearl, also known as Mariah Carey: Live in Las Vegas, was a four-evening promotional concert residency by American singer Mariah Carey. The concerts were showcased at the Pearl Concert Theater on the Las Vegas Strip in Paradise, Nevada.

== Background ==
It was rumored in early July 2009 that Carey would perform a mini-residency at The Palms Resort & Casino in Las Vegas.

Carey announced the end of July on her official website that she was going to do four concerts at The Palms Resort & Casino in Las Vegas in the 2,500-seat Pearl Concert Theater.

== Set list ==
1. "Butterfly Overture / Daydream Interlude" (Intro)
2. "Shake It Off"
3. "Touch My Body"
4. "Fly Like a Bird"
5. "Make It Happen" (Performed by background dancers)
6. "Angels Cry"
7. "Always Be My Baby"
8. "It's Like That" (With elements of "Hollis Crew" and "Sucker M.C.'s" by Run-DMC)
9. "Subtle Invitation"
10. "Rock With You" (Performed by Trey Lorenz followed by band introductions)
11. "Honey"
12. "Heartbreaker" (With elements from "Desert Storm Remix")
13. "Close My Eyes"
14. "My All"
15. "Obsessed"
16. "Up Out My Face"
17. "I Want to Know What Love Is"
18. "We Belong Together"
19. "Hero"
20. "Hero Reprise" (Outro)

== Broadcasts and recordings ==
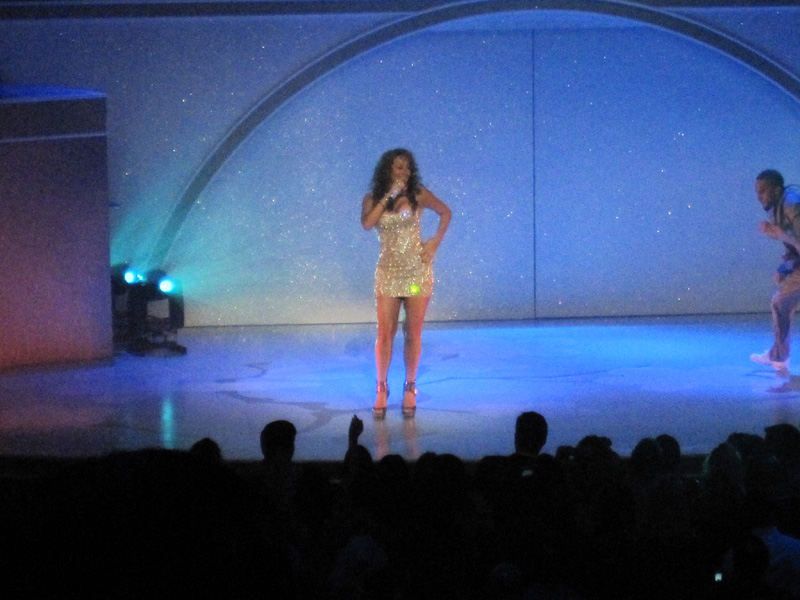
Carey performing during Live at the Pearl in 2009

The September 11 and 12 concerts were filmed and later broadcast worldwide in over 200 countries and on 235 devices. A news report read: "Mariah Carey, one of the best selling recording and performing artists of our time will make history, Saturday, Oct. 10, when her performance “Mariah Carey Live In Las Vegas” becomes the first concert to be simulcast to mobile (internet enabled phones) and other digital devices worldwide". The digital version included 10 songs from the concert, and lasts approximately 45 minutes and was priced at $9.99.

Steve Bartels, President/COO, Island Def Jam Music Group said of the event: "Fans from all over the world can now share the excitement of a live concert, wherever, whenever, and on whatever digital device they chose". For promotional use, one-minute clips of "Obsessed" and "I Want To Know What Love Is" were recorded at the September shows. A trailer was also created for promotional purposes for her Japanese fans. Ten of the songs from the show were released on a digital album in 2014, available on iTunes, called At the Pearl Palms Concert Theatre.

== Shows ==
Date	Venue
September 11, 2009	Pearl Concert Theater
September 12, 2009	Pearl Concert Theater
October 9, 2009	Pearl Concert Theater
October 10, 2009	Pearl Concert Theater
