= It's a Wrap =

2023 promotional single by Mariah Carey

Promotional single by Mariah Carey

from the album Memoirs of an Imperfect Angel
- Released: February 10, 2023
- Recorded: 2009
- Studio: Boom Boom Room (Burbank, California); Honeywest (New York City)
- Genre: R&B
- Length: 3:59
- Label: Island; Def Jam
- Songwriters: Mariah Carey; Barry White
- Producers: Mariah Carey; Heatmyzer (Note: Heatmyzer is an alias of Carey's then-husband Nick Cannon.); Christopher "Tricky" Stewart; James "Big Jim" Wright

Audio video
- "It's a Wrap" on YouTube

Visualizer
- "It's a Wrap (Sped Up)" on YouTube

"It's a Wrap" is a song recorded by American singer Mariah Carey for her twelfth studio album Memoirs of an Imperfect Angel (2009). It is a doo wop-inflected R&B breakup song with minimal instrumentation and features lyrics about dismissing a lover. The track samples "I Belong to You" by Love Unlimited, whose writer Barry White is credited on "It's a Wrap" along with Carey. She produced it with Heatmyzer and previous collaborators Christopher "Tricky" Stewart and James "Big Jim" Wright. A remix features additional vocals by American singer Mary J. Blige.

Music critics disagreed on whether to categorize "It's a Wrap" among the best in Carey's discography or classify it as a mediocre effort. Carey performed the song on the television program Lopez Tonight in 2009. She reprised it throughout the Angels Advocate Tour in 2010 and received positive reviews that highlighted her vocals and energy. In early 2023, "It's a Wrap" went viral due to a TikTok dance challenge and was released as a promotional single on February 10 that year as part of a digital extended play. It peaked at number 24 on US Hot R&B Songs and entered charts in the United Kingdom, New Zealand and South Korea.

== Background and release ==
Island Records released Mariah Carey's eleventh studio album E=MC² in April 2008. It opened to her largest US first-week sales following appearances on American Idol and The Oprah Winfrey Show. The lead single, "Touch My Body", become Carey's eighteenth number one on the Billboard Hot 100. (Note: This made her the solo artist with the most number ones on the chart, surpassing Elvis Presley.) She married American entertainer Nick Cannon shortly after the album's release and decreased its promotion to focus on her personal life.

In early 2009, Carey began working on follow-up album Memoirs of an Imperfect Angel with "Touch My Body" producer Christopher "Tricky" Stewart and "Fly Like a Bird" producer James "Big Jim" Wright. Despite her marriage, Carey envisioned a women's empowerment theme with songs about not needing men in life. One day at their home studio, Carey came in humming a melody while Cannon was toying with chords and samples. His suggestion that they conceptualize "if I came home hella late and you kickin' me out the house" formed the basis for the song "It's a Wrap". It appears as the eighth track on the album between two others of a similar theme, "Standing O" and "Up Out My Face".

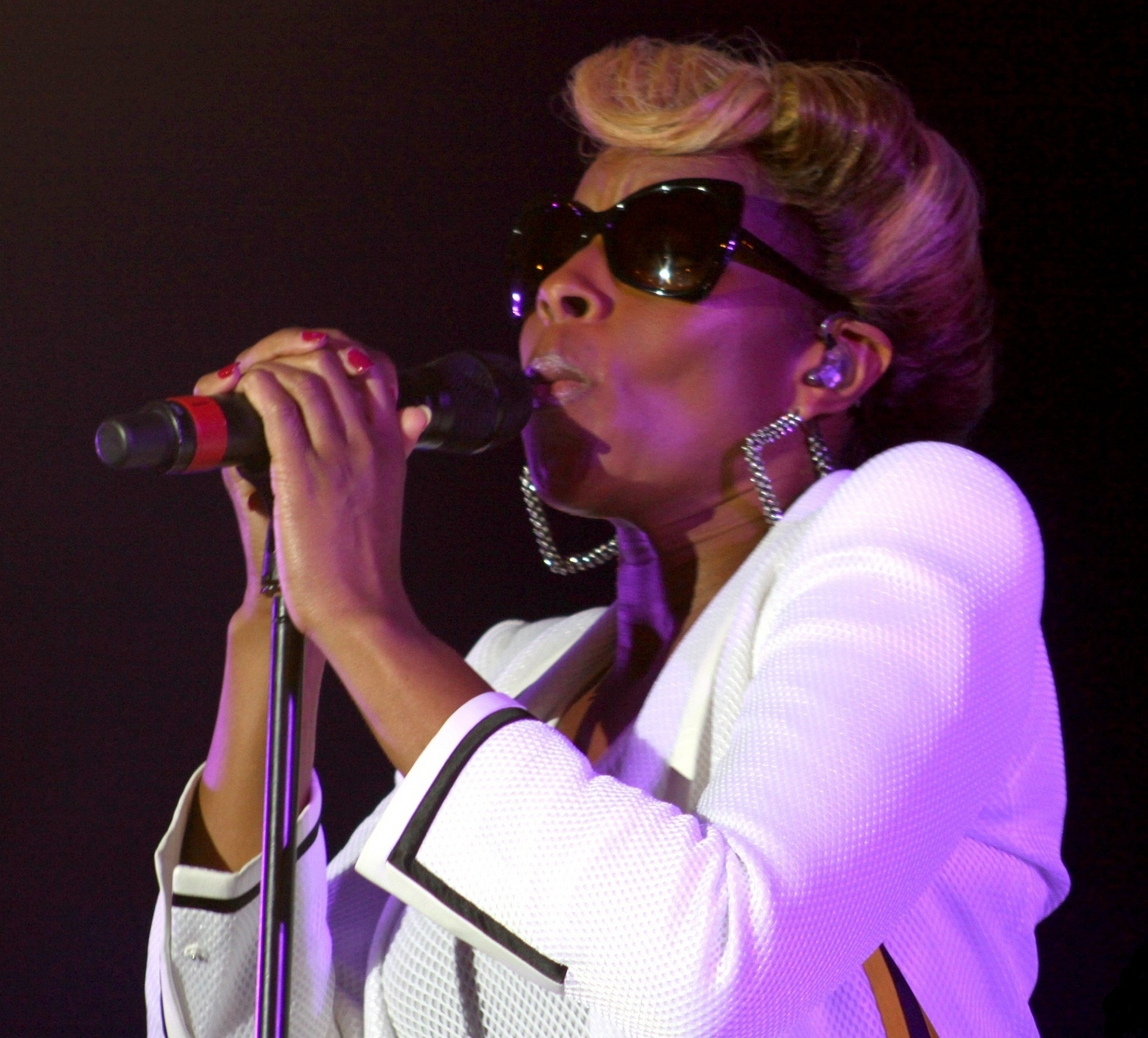
Mary J. Blige features on the song's remix.

Carey is the sole artist on Memoirs of an Imperfect Angel, which Island released on September 28, 2009. In early 2010, she announced that a follow-up project, Angels Advocate, would feature remixes of tracks from the album as duets. American singer Mary J. Blige, whom Carey had long admired, (Note: Carey once told collaborator Cory Rooney that "Mary doesn't have to sell 28 million records to be respected – people respect Mary, and I just want to be respected like her.") appears as a featured artist on the remix to "It's a Wrap". (Note: Blige had previously recorded a song with the same title and similar theme for her 2003 album Love & Life.) Universal Music Group cancelled Angels Advocate for unknown reasons and the remix was included as a bonus track on the deluxe edition of Carey's fourteenth studio album Me. I Am Mariah... The Elusive Chanteuse (2014). The song subsequently debuted at number 100 on the Gaon South Korea International Digital chart, which ranks the best-performing tracks by international artists based on streaming, downloads and background music sales.

=== 2023 resurgence ===
In early 2023, a sped-up edition of "It's a Wrap" became popular on social media with a viral dance challenge. Carey posted a TikTok video lip syncing to the version and encouraged her fans to follow. The clip received 10 million views and its audio was used for 650,000 others. After the song's US streams increased 1,000 percent in one month, Def Jam Recordings issued a four-track digital extended play containing the album version, remix, sped-up version and a shortened edit on February 10, 2023. Carey continued promoting the song with additional TikTok dance videos featuring her children and Kim Kardashian, which collectively received over 35 million views. A 12-inch vinyl of the EP was released on December 1, 2023.

Along with The Weeknd's "Die for You" and Lady Gaga's "Bloody Mary", "It's a Wrap" was one of several songs to appear on music charts in early 2023 due to viral sped-up versions. After receiving 2,500 downloads, it debuted at number 22 on the US R&B/Hip-Hop Digital Song Sales chart dated February 25, 2023. "It's a Wrap" entered at number 24 on Hot R&B Songs the following week, aided by 3.6 million streams as calculated by Luminate. On March 6, 2023, the sped-up version reached number 36 on the New Zealand Hot Singles chart, which measures "the 40 fastest-moving tracks by sales, streams and airplay".

== Composition and lyrics ==
Musically, "It's a Wrap" is an R&B song with doo wop inflections. It contains elements from "I Belong to You" (1974) by the female vocal trio Love Unlimited and samples the performance by Love Unlimited Orchestra. The composer and lyricist, Barry White, is credited as a writer on "It's a Wrap" along with Carey. She produced the song with Heatmyzer, Stewart and Wright. They integrate instrumentation sparsely in the arrangement. Stewart, Wright, Leon Bisquera and Monte Neuble play the keyboards and Hammond B3, Alex Al performs the bass guitar and Ronnie Gutierrez provides percussion.

Brian Garten and Brian "B-Luv" Thomas recorded "It's a Wrap" at Honeywest Studies in New York City and The Boom Boom Room in Burbank, California. Jaycen-Joshua Fowler and Dave Pensado mixed it at Larrabee Studios in Universal City, California, after which Brian Gardner conducted mastering at the Los Angeles-based Bernie Grundman Mastering. Luis Navarro aided during the recording process and Giancarlo Lina assisted in the mixing. The album version of "It's a Wrap" lasts three minutes and fifty-nine seconds and an edited version is approximately one minute shorter.

"It's a Wrap"
"It's a Wrap", an R&B song, features Carey singing with a high-pitched open voice complemented by minimal instrumentation.

"It's a Wrap" is a breakup song that incorporates two verses, a pre-chorus, chorus and bridge. Its lyrics involve a hungover Carey decisively dismissing a lover from her life. After beginning the song with a wail, she sings with an open voice in a high-pitched tone. Carey describes both her inner thoughts ("I was oh, so acquiescent – but I learned my lesson") and outward feelings ("I should crack you right in your forehead"). She threatens to call Maury Povich (Note: Povich hosts the American tabloid television talk show Maury, which features paternity test and lie detector results.) and declares of the relationship: "When it's gone, it's gone".

The song received critical analysis. Chicago Tribune critic Greg Kot and Mesfin Fekadu of the Associated Press described Carey's vocals as containing grit and attitude, respectively. Writing in Between the Lines, Chris Azzopardi dubbed "It's a Wrap" a "fierce-girl anthem" and The Boston Globe's Sarah Rodman labeled it a "saucy kiss-off". Jon Caramanica of The New York Times and Michael Cragg of MusicOMH remarked the song recalls a girl group aura. The Gazette's T'Cha Dunlevy felt the recording had a sense of swing and The Village Voice's Clover Hope described it as retro.

In the remix, Blige adds an introduction coercing Carey to leave the relationship: "Why don't you just cut this guy loose? Tell him it's a wrap cos you're better than that. And you Mariah Carey. Remember?" News.com.au writer Cameron Adams considered it a "2014 celebrity update" of Charlene's "I've Never Been to Me" (1977) and thought the new lyrics resembled dialogue from Carey's 2001 film Glitter. In an article for BET, Dominique Zonyeé felt the remix evokes "a women's-only club vibe".

== Critical reception ==
Music critics judged "It's a Wrap" against other songs in Carey's catalog. Mesfin Fekadu of the Associated Press considered it a classic comparable to "Always Be My Baby", "Vision of Love" and "We Belong Together". In contrast, Cragg felt it lacked the nonchalant nature of "Fantasy" or "Honey". Adams derided the lyrics as some of the worst in Carey's career. Writing for Billboard in 2017, Everett Brothers deemed it "the most refreshingly creative song [she] has written and performed in recent memory". The magazine placed the remix at number 22 in their 2020 list of Carey's 100 best songs.

The song's composition and Carey's vocal performance were topics of commentary. For Time Out's Kim Taylor Bennett, "It's a Wrap" sounds "slick and sophisticated but bland". Dunlevy perceived the production passé and Hope praised it as nostalgic. Kot thought the production augmented Carey's vocal delivery. According to Fekadu, the latter "is so sensuous and sweet, even the song's intended target will remain under her spell".

The remix received reviews regarding the dynamic between Blige and Carey. Devone Jones of PopMatters said it is successful because, rather than outsing each other, the pair have complementary charm. Zonyeé reckoned the duet superior to the original. Billboard's Rania Aniftos considered the remix commanding; Brothers believed the delayed release stymied its effectiveness.

== Live performances ==
Carey performed "It's a Wrap" on television and tour. On December 17, 2009, she sang it during an episode of the US late-night talk show Lopez Tonight. Carey reprised the track for the 2009–2010 Angels Advocate Tour in a choreographed routine with a male backup dancer acting as the man she dismisses. Her performances garnered positive feedback from American newspaper critics, who considered it a successful vocal showcase. Azzopardi felt "It's a Wrap" sounded better on stage and The Washington Post's Chris Richards thought the live version gained a verve comparable to "Honey" and "Heartbreaker". Rodman remarked Carey "dug giddily" into the performance and The Press of Atlantic City's Scott Cronick described it as a highlight. In 2023, Carey sang "It's a Wrap" during a headline performance at Los Angeles Pride and at the Merry Christmas One and All! tour.

== Track listing ==
2023 EP

1. "It's a Wrap" – 3:59
2. "It's a Wrap (Sped Up)" – 2:44
3. "It's a Wrap" (featuring Mary J. Blige) – 4:04
4. "It's a Wrap (Edit)" – 3:01

== Credits and personnel ==
Credits adapted from the liner notes of Memoirs of an Imperfect Angel unless otherwise noted.

Recording

- Recorded at The Boom Boom Room (Burbank, California) and Honeywest Studios (New York City)
- Mixed at Larrabee Studios (Universal City, California)
- Mastered at Bernie Grundman Mastering (Los Angeles)

Personnel

- Songwriting – Mariah Carey and Barry White
- Production – Carey, Heatmyzer, Christopher "Tricky" Stewart and James "Big Jim" Wright
- Recording – Brian Garten and Brian "B-Luv" Thomas
- Recording assistant – Luis Navarro
- Keys and Hammond B3 – Wright, Stewart, Leon Bisquera and Monte Neuble
- Bass guitar – Alex Al
- Percussion – Ronnie Gutierrez
- Mixing – Jaycen-Joshua Fowler and Dave Pensado
- Mixing (Sped Up, Edit versions) – Fowler, Pensado and Garten
- Mixing assistant – Giancarlo Lino
- Mastering – Brian Gardner

== Chart performance ==
Chart performance for "It's a Wrap"
Chart (2023)	Peak position
UK Physical Singles (OCC)	24
US Hot R&B Songs (Billboard)	24
US R&B/Hip-Hop Digital Songs (Billboard)	22

Chart performance for "It's a Wrap (Sped Up)"
Chart (2023)	Peak position
New Zealand Hot Singles (RMNZ)	36

Chart performance for "It's a Wrap" (featuring Mary J. Blige)
Chart (2014)	Peak position
South Korea International Digital (Gaon)	100

== Certifications ==
Certifications for "It's a Wrap" (featuring Mary J. Blige)
Region	Certification	Certified units/sales
New Zealand (RMNZ)	Gold	15,000^{‡}
^{‡} Sales+streaming figures based on certification alone.

== Release history ==
Release dates and formats for "It's a Wrap"
Region	Date	Format(s)	Label	Ref.
Various	February 10, 2023	Digital download; streaming	Def Jam	
United States	December 1, 2023	Twelve-inch vinyl	Def Jam	
