= Up Out My Face =

Single by Mariah Carey

Song by Mariah Carey

from the album Memoirs of an Imperfect Angel
- Released: September 29, 2009
- Recorded: 2009
- Studio: The Boom Boom Room (Burbank, CA); Larrabee Sound Studios (North Hollywood, CA); Honeywest Studios (New York City, NY)
- Length: 3:41
- Label: Island Def Jam
- Songwriters: Mariah Carey; Tricky Stewart; Terius Nash
- Producers: Mariah Carey; Tricky Stewart; Terius Nash

Audio video
- "Up Out My Face" on YouTube

"Up Out My Face"

Single by Mariah Carey featuring Nicki Minaj
- Released: January 26, 2010
- Recorded: 2009
- Studio: The Boom Boom Room (Burbank, CA); Larrabee Sound Studios (North Hollywood, CA); Honeywest Studios (New York City, NY)
- Genre: R&B
- Length: 4:23 (main version); 3:58 (radio edit)
- Label: Island Def Jam
- Songwriters: Mariah Carey; Tricky Stewart; Terius Nash; Onika Maraj
- Producers: Mariah Carey; Tricky Stewart; Terius Nash

Mariah Carey singles chronology
| "H.A.T.E.U." (2009) | "Up Out My Face" (2010) | "Angels Cry" (2010) |

Nicki Minaj singles chronology
| "BedRock" (2009) | "Up Out My Face" (2010) | "Knockout" (2010) |

Music video
- "Up Out My Face" on YouTube

"Up Out My Face" is a song by American singer-songwriter Mariah Carey from her twelfth studio album, Memoirs of an Imperfect Angel (2009). Written and produced by Carey, Tricky Stewart and The-Dream, it is a song which includes a marching band in its instrumentation. The lyrics for the song have been speculated to be directed at American rapper Eminem, whom Carey has a longstanding feud with since the early 2000s, after his claims that they were in a relationship.

The song received generally positive reviews from music critics for its humorous lyrics and the addition of rapper Nicki Minaj on the remix. Carey released Minaj's version as a single in January 2010 for a proposed remix album titled Angels Advocate, which was ultimately shelved. A music video was released nevertheless and was directed by Nick Cannon, Carey's then husband, which also received positive reviews.

== Background and release ==
"Up Out My Face" was written and produced by Mariah Carey, Tricky Stewart and The-Dream, for Carey's twelfth studio album, Memoirs of an Imperfect Angel (2009). Carey later intended to re-release Memoirs of an Imperfect Angel as a remix album under the title Angels Advocate, which would have consisted of remixes of the standard songs with featured artists. Some of these artists included Mary J. Blige, R. Kelly, Gucci Mane among others. "Angels Cry" and "Up Out My Face" were released as remix singles with Ne-Yo and Nicki Minaj respectively. In an interview for MTV News at Dylan's Candy Bar, Minaj revealed that she had kept her remix of the song a secret from everyone she knew because she was "so surprised" at being asked to work with Carey.

Minaj and Carey's duet of "Up Out My Face" was released to rhythmic contemporary and urban contemporary radio in the United States on January 26, 2010. It was made available for digital download on February 16, 2010. Despite the release, in March 2010, production of Angels Advocate had halted and the project was shelved indefinitely. Island Def Jam stated that the singer was instead working on a new project and "new surprises". Metro revealed that Carey was recording a second Christmas album.

== Composition ==
A club music song that lasts for three minutes, forty-one seconds, "Up Out My Face" appears as the ninth track on the album; track ten is a fifty-one second reprise called "Up Out My Face (The Reprise)". Its instrumentation makes use of a "thumping" marching band coda, while its lyrics are about expressing "anger at an incompatible lover". Brian Mansfield of USA Today highlights the lyrics "If we were two Lego blocks, even the Harvard University graduating class of 2010 couldn't put us back together again" as one of the album's "many funny lines". Rolling Stone writer Jody Rosen wrote that the singer "gets in touch with her funny bone" on "Up Out My Face". Sal Cinquemani of Slant Magazine described the references to Lego, Harvard University and Humpty Dumpty as "a whole new level of lyrical ridiculousness".

Musically, the remix does not greatly differ from that of the original apart from added rap verses by Minaj interspersed throughout the track. She adds some "spunky rhymes" including "Mariah, I was in the million dollar meetin's, he was cheatin' / All up in the church he was sneakin' with the deacon," and references Trey Songz 2009 single "LOL :-)" in a British accent. While the original version is three minutes, forty-one seconds in duration, the remix lasts for four minutes, twenty-three seconds.

== Lyrical interpretation ==
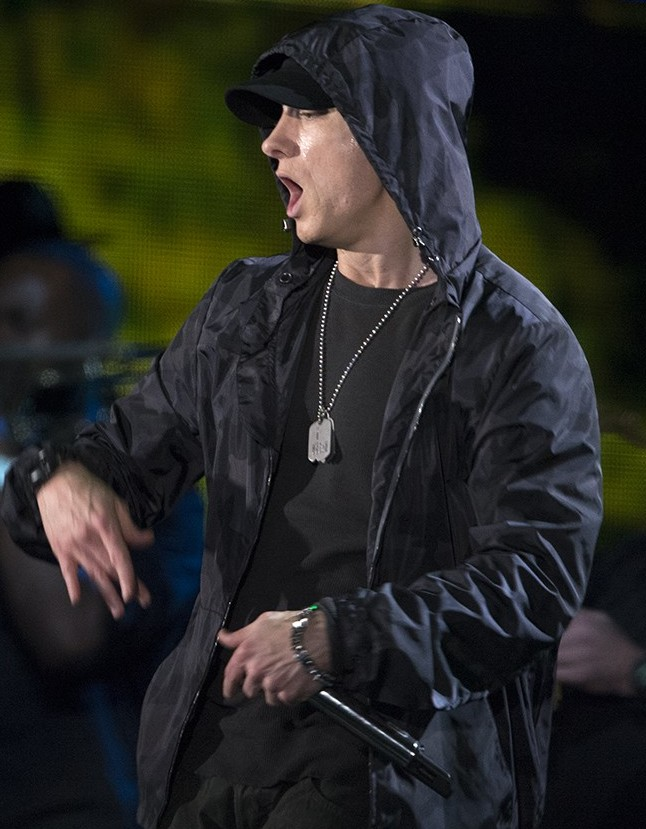
USA Today writer Brian Mansfield speculated that the lyrics of "Up Out My Face" were about Eminem (pictured)

Brian Mansfield speculated that Carey was addressing Eminem in the lyrics, with whom she has had a longstanding feud. Carey has reportedly been romantically linked with several male celebrities during the course of her career, some of which she has openly spoken about and acknowledged, while others she has denied dating. Eminem has claimed on multiple occasions that he dated Carey, but Carey has always firmly denied that she knew him on a romantic level. In 2001, Carey contacted Eminem to discuss the possibility of writing a song together for inclusion on Carey's ninth studio album Charmbracelet (2002), and they reportedly started dating soon after.

In 2002, Eminem mentioned the singer twice on The Eminem Show, his fourth studio album, on the tracks "Superman" and "When the Music Stops", both of which were revealed to have been inspired by their relationship in Eminem's 2008 autobiography, The Way I Am. The former track contained the lyrics "What you trying be? My new wife? / What, you Mariah? Fly through twice," while the latter suggested that he begged to be taken back by Carey. Later that year, Eminem confirmed that they had been in a relationship in an interview for Rolling Stone, but claimed to have not been fully committed to it and that he disliked her as a person, while Carey told Maxim that it was never a "sexual relationship" and interviewer Larry King "I hung out with him, I spoke to him on the phone. I think I was probably with him a total of four times. And I don't consider that dating somebody." Carey recorded a song called "Clown" for Charmbracelet which "ambiguously addressed the relationship" with the lyrics "Should've left it at I like your music too" and "You should've never intimated we were lovers/ When you know very well we never even touched each other."

In 2005, Eminem played voicemails to the audience during his Anger Management Tour allegedly from Carey and reported as saying "Why won't you see me? Why won't you call me?". Eminem reiterated his dislike of Carey the following year on a track called "Jimmy Crack Corn" from his compilation album, Eminem Presents: The Re-Up, with the lyrics "Your mind's on us like mine's on Mariah / And y'all are just like her, you're all fucking liars / But I'll just keep fucking you like I fucked her / Right in the ass with KY yes sir." 50 Cent referenced Carey's denial of the relationship on a track called "All of Me" from his third studio album Curtis in 2007: "Em predicted it all, I don't know how he knew it / He said women from Hollywood they liars, liars, liars / You fuck them, they get you heated, deny it like Mariah." Two years later, Eminem released a song called "Bagpipes from Baghdad", on which he took aim at Carey's husband Nick Cannon by calling him a "prick" and wishing him "luck with the fucking whore". The lead single from Memoirs of an Imperfect Angel was "Obsessed". Many critics believed the track to be about Eminem, and its accompanying music video portrayed Carey being followed by a male stalker which critics also thought bore a strong resemblance to the rapper. Mansfield thought that the lyrical content of "Up Out My Face" appeared to be a continuation of "Obsessed" and her feud with Eminem, as Carey sings "I know you're not a rapper, so you better stop spittin' it."

== Critical reception ==
"Even though this version [...] was originally meant to be included on the Angel Advocate remix album that never materialized, the buoyant clap-back anthem with Mariah and her future American Idol co-star/frenemy took off with its own set of wings. The Nicki Minaj-assisted hit serves up a double whammy that hoisted the song onto the Hot 100, like both stars' scornful hand gesture from the dolled-up music video."

— Heran Mamo, Billboard writer

Upon release, the song received generally positive reviews. Bill Lamb of Dotdash placed "Up Out My Face" in his list of the album's top four tracks. Although J. Edward Keyes of Newsday described the track as "exuberant", he was critical of its placement on the album: "The production, courtesy of the reliable Tricky Stewart and The-Dream, feels boilerplate at best. At 17 songs, the record is far too long, and by the time the exuberant 'Up Out My Face' arrives, it feels like it was grafted on from a better record." Ann Powers of Los Angeles Times thought that Carey lacked conviction in her approach to the song, writing that despite its aggressive tone, "restraint stops serving her agenda".

Similar to the original track, the remix had a blended reception. The Washington Post Alison Stewart praised the track, writing that the addition of Minaj made it more lively: "Sometime in the past six months, Minaj became the go-to girl for artists who wanted to add some skank to their tracks without sullying themselves in the process. Here, she enlivens an otherwise polite track from Carey's upcoming remix disc". Robbie Daw of Idolator felt that the track was too reminiscent to one of Carey's previous singles "Don't Forget About Us", which he thought in turn was very similar to another preceding single, "We Belong Together". He contained to add "But still, if Mimi's going to mine from her own extensive back catalog of ballads, those are the primo melodies to go for."

Billboard placed the remix at number 28 on their 100 Greatest Mariah Carey Song list in 2020, during the release of Carey's The Rarities.

== Live performances ==
Carey has performed the solo version of the song many times on the Angels Advocate Tour. She also performed the song on her four-evening promotional concert residency, Live at the Pearl, which was among nine other songs released on an iTunes digital album in 2014, called At the Pearl Palms Concert Theatre.

== Music video ==
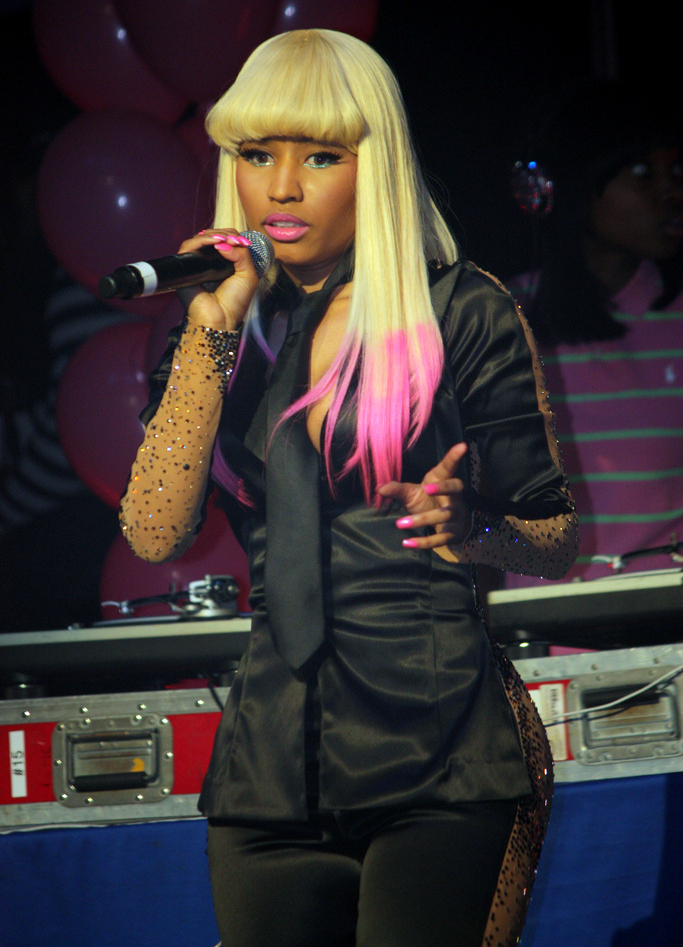
Nicki Minaj (pictured) was featured on the remix of the song and praised Carey for working with her

=== Background ===
The accompanying music video for the remix of "Up Out My Face" was directed by Carey's husband, Nick Cannon. Minaj spoke about filming a video with Carey and how she did not believe that the video would ever be released: "I didn't even tell anyone I shot a video with Mariah, because I didn't even believe. In the back of my mind, I felt like, 'This video is not gonna come out. There's no way I'm gonna do a video with Mariah Carey before I even put out my album.' Then, when it came out, I think it was the number one video on YouTube in one day, something crazy like that." It premiered simultaneously with the video for "Angels Cry" with Ne-Yo on Vevo on January 28, 2010.

=== Synopsis ===
Carey and Minaj play different characters, including Barbie dolls who escape from their boxes, sexy nurses in matching outfits, two women in a nail salon and two divas shopping. Carey's doll box has "She sings" written on the front, while Minaj's say "She raps". Cannon makes a cameo appearance in the video, which Chris Ryan of MTV Buzzworthy thought was a reference to the 2002 film, Drumline. According to Anna Pickard of The Guardian, the escape from their packaging demonstrates a theme of being independent women and that they will not be restrained by men.

=== Reception ===
Melina Newman of HitFix thought that it looked like one of Carey's lowest-production budgets for a music video to date, but explained that it was not necessarily "a bad thing", and that Carey looked "adorable" in a nurses outfit. She likened the use of a red and white color scheme for the video to a Target commercial. Furthermore, the red and white aesthetic of the music video led many fans to also compare it to a "Target commercial", especially with the scenes involving Barbie doll-like characters, shopping carts, as well as Mariah Carey's Jack Russell Terrier Jack reminding some of the Target mascot Bull Terrier. Anna Pickard commented that Carey and Minaj looked "grumpier" than what dolls usually do because "their men are low-down dirty dogs who should henceforth get up out of Mimi and Nicki's faces". She compared the use of a red and white palette to Kylie Minogue's music video for "Can't Get You Out of My Head", Cheryl Cole's "Fight for This Love" and Lady Gaga's "Bad Romance", and that it appeared to be a "go-to device for directors who want their pop video to pop visually, without the need for too much pesky plot to worry about". Minaj herself went on to praise Carey in an interview with MTV News noting that,

"A lot of times, more famous artists or more confident artists take from a younger artist but they’ll never include you in that. I feel like she liked the whole doll thing and she wanted to do it with me. But she said that: She said, 'Everybody’s gonna say 'she’s doing Nicki.' But I told her, she’s always had a doll persona, like all that 'doll baby' [stuff]. So it goes perfect with Barbie and we had fun. That's all that matters".

Chris Ryan thought that Minaj outshined Carey in the video. In a review of Minaj's ten best videos in December 2014, Rolling Stone ranked the video for "Up Out My Face" at number eight, and wrote that Carey and Minaj had "great on-camera chemistry".

== Charts ==
| Chart (2009–10) | Peak position |
|---|---|
| South Korea International (Gaon) | 25 |
| US Billboard Hot 100 | 100 |
| US Hot R&B/Hip-Hop Songs (Billboard) | 39 |

== Certifications ==
| Region | Certification | Certified units/sales |
|---|---|---|
| United States (RIAA) | Gold | 500,000^{‡} |
^{‡} Sales+streaming figures based on certification alone.

== Release history ==
| Country | Date | Format | Label |
|---|---|---|---|
| United States | January 26, 2010 | Rhythmic contemporary | Island Records |
| United States | January 26, 2010 | Urban contemporary | Island Records |
| United States | February 16, 2010 | Digital download | Island Records |
