= H.A.T.E.U. =

Single by Mariah Carey

from the album Memoirs of an Imperfect Angel
- Released: November 1, 2009
- Studio: The Boom Boom Room; Honeywest
- Genre: R&B
- Length: 4:27
- Label: Island Def Jam
- Songwriters: Mariah Carey; Tricky Stewart; The-Dream
- Producers: Mariah Carey; Tricky Stewart; The-Dream

Mariah Carey singles chronology
"I Want to Know What Love Is" (2009)	"H.A.T.E.U." (2009)	"Up Out My Face" (2010)

Music video
- "H.A.T.E.U." on YouTube

"H.A.T.E.U." (acronym for "Having A Typical Emotional Upset") is a song by American singer-songwriter Mariah Carey from her twelfth studio album, Memoirs of an Imperfect Angel (2009). It was written and produced by Carey, Tricky Stewart, and the-Dream. It was released as the third single from the album on November 1, 2009, for radio airplay in the United States. It is a down-tempo R&B love song about Carey wishing for the love and pain she feels from a break-up to turn into hate so she can get over the relationship.

The song garnered a positive response from music critics, with many ranking it amongst the best on the album. The song's music video was directed by Brett Ratner in Malibu, and features Carey in a variety of swimsuits walking along the beach. She has performed the track live on Today and Late Show with David Letterman. "H.A.T.E.U." reached number 72 on the US Hot R&B/Hip-Hop Songs chart.

== Production ==
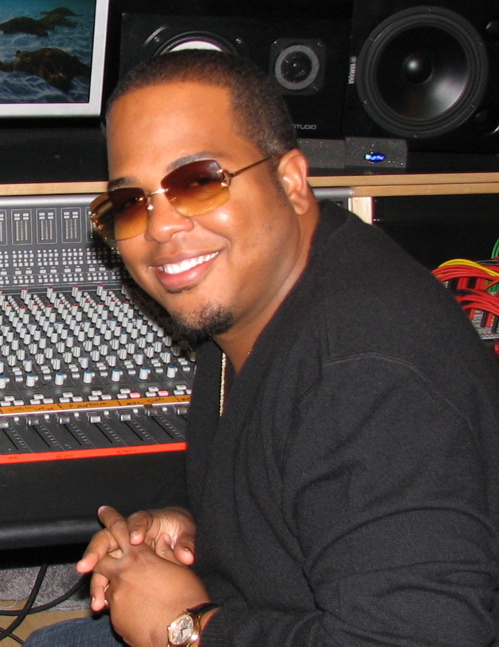
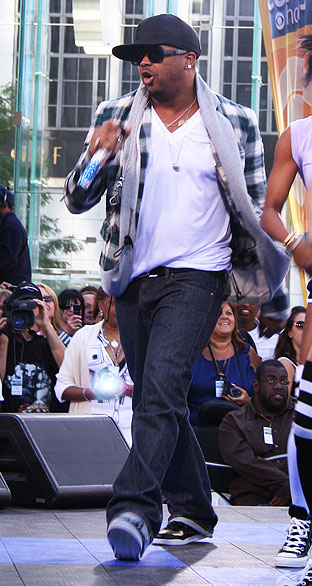
Carey wrote and produced "H.A.T.E.U." with Tricky Stewart (left) and The-Dream (right).

"H.A.T.E.U." was written and produced by Mariah Carey, Tricky Stewart, and The-Dream for Carey's twelfth studio album, Memoirs of an Imperfect Angel (2009). It was one of the first songs to be written for the album. On May 20, 2009, L.A. Reid hosted an event called the Island Def Jam Spring Collection, where he "unveiled his latest muses". He premiered "H.A.T.E.U." by Carey as well as music videos by Kanye West, The-Dream, and Fabolous. A low-quality snippet of the song leaked onto the internet the following day, three months before the album's initial release date of August 25.

== Composition ==
A down-tempo R&B love song, "H.A.T.E.U." is an acronym for "Having A Typical Emotional Upset". Lyrically, the song is about reaching the point following a break-up where Carey no longer feels love or pain and it turns into hate. The refrain consists of Carey repeating the lyrics "I can't wait to hate you". The singer employs her lower register in a "narcotized vocal haze" which places emphasis on the pain and struggling endured between two people who are no longer in a relationship together.

In an interview for YouTube posted on December 24, 2009, Carey elaborated on the lyrical meaning, saying that it "really hits people in their hearts because it's like ... everybody has experienced when you love somebody, and they let you go, but you can't let them go. So 'I can't wait to hate you' is a strong statement". Michaelangelo Matos of The A.V. Club compared the seagull chirp "vocal acrobatic" sung by Carey during the track's climax to the whistle notes she sings on her 1991 single "Emotions".

== Release and remixes ==
The song was released as the album's third single to contemporary hit/Top 40, rhythmic contemporary, and urban contemporary radio stations in the United States on November 1, 2009. Carey revealed that she intended to re-release Memoirs of an Imperfect Angel as a remix album in early 2010, titled Angels Advocate, consisting of remixes of the standard songs with new featured artists, including Mary J. Blige, Snoop Dogg, Trey Songz, R. Kelly, T-Pain, Gucci Mane, and OJ da Juiceman.

OJ da Juiceman confirmed that he had recorded his verse for a remix of "H.A.T.E.U." in November 2009. In an interview for MTV News, he revealed his shock at being telephoned by Jermaine Dupri to record some vocals for the remix of "H.A.T.E.U" alongside Gucci Mane and Big Boi. Juiceman said that his verse took ten minutes to record. It contains a sample of "My Boo" by Ghost Town DJ's. A writer for DJ Booth wrote that the remixes produced by Dupri sped up the slow tempo of the original version and added some percussion. He continued to write that while the remix is not superior to the original, but it is catchier and more likely to receive radio airplay. Jason Nevins produced a remix called "H.A.T.E.U." (Jason Nevins "Loves U" Remix) for the Just Dance 3 soundtrack released in June 2010.

== Critical reception ==
"H.A.T.E.U." received positive reviews from critics. Jon Caramanica of The New York Times said that "H.A.T.E.U." has an "ease" about it which is similar to previous single releases by Carey. Bill Lamb of About.com described the track as "sad" and placed it in his list of the album's top four tracks. Rap-Up also included "H.A.T.E.U." in their top four tracks of the album.

The Seattle Times writer Mesfin Fekadu described the song as "a beautiful heartbreak ballad". Melinda Newman of HitFix commented that despite the name of the song, it is not a rant, and that it is a "bittersweet" ballad about love. Chris Ryan of MTV Buzzworthy thought that the track was "one of the prettiest and most effective" on the album. Michael Cragg of musicOMH felt that Carey achieved a balance of "simplicity with urgency" on the track.

A writer for DJ Booth noted that Carey's confidence on the lead single "Obsessed" bordered on aggression, and that the residual energy from the track carried over to other songs on the album, including "H.A.T.E.U." and "Up Out My Face", whereby she was "ready for war". Kathy Iandoli of HipHopDX criticized Carey's vocals, writing: "An attempted whistle-tone at the close of 'H.A.T.E.U.' doesn't necessarily indicate that Carey’s pipes are rusting, but perhaps she's succeeding more with less blustery vocals these days".

== Music video ==
The accompanying music video for "H.A.T.E.U." was directed by Brett Ratner in Malibu. It was made available to download on iTunes on December 8, 2009.

The video starts with Carey walking down some steps onto the beach wearing a black bathing suit and high heel shoes, which she takes off when she gets to the bottom and walks onto the sand. Carey is seen in different shots standing next to a cliff-face as well as in the middle of the beach for the majority of the video. For the bridge, Carey is seen in multiple different shots as she walks along the shoreline, which changes as the last verse takes place, where her outfit changes from a black bathing suit to a different style white bathing suit whilst the sun sets in the background. As the video comes to an end, the scenery has changed to nighttime, and Carey is wearing another black bathing suit with a black jacket standing against a rock-face. Carey then inscribes into the sand "H.A.T.E.U." using her fingers, which she underlines as the video fades to black. The video is also inter-cut throughout with shots of the scenery on the beach. Rap-Up described the video as "picturesque". Chris Ryan of MTV Buzzworthy wrote that it is a "slow-mo, beachwear fashion show". He continued, "Equally depressed by the end of a relationship and inspired by the scenery, Mimi spends a few minutes suggestively touching herself and staring into the middle distance. What becomes of the broken-hearted?"

== Live performances ==
On October 2, 2009, Carey performed a four-track set list on NBC's Today. She began with her 1992 single "Make It Happen", followed by "Obsessed" and "I Want to Know What Love Is". She concluded with "H.A.T.E.U." On November 13, 2009, Carey performed the track on the Late Show with David Letterman.

== Charts ==
Chart (2009–2010)	Peak position
New Zealand Urban Radio (RadioScope) featuring OJ da Juiceman	28
US Hot R&B/Hip-Hop Songs (Billboard)	72

== Release history ==
Country	Date	Format	Label
United States	November 1, 2009	Contemporary hit/Top 40	The Island Def Jam Music Group
United States	November 1, 2009	Rhythmic contemporary	The Island Def Jam Music Group
United States	November 1, 2009	Urban contemporary	The Island Def Jam Music Group
