= Memoirs of an Imperfect Angel =

Studio album by Mariah Carey
- Released: September 28, 2009
- Recorded: 2009
- Studios: The Boom Boom Room (Burbank); Studio at the Palms (Las Vegas); Honeywest (New York); Germano (New York); Larrabee West (Los Angeles); Triangle Sound (Atlanta); The Setai (Miami)
- Genres: R&B; hip hop
- Length: 58:01
- Labels: Island Def Jam; Island; Def Jam
- Producers: Mariah Carey; James "Big Jim" Wright; Heatmyzer; Los Da Mystro; Christopher "Tricky" Stewart; Terius "The-Dream" Nash

Mariah Carey chronology
The Ballads (2008)	Memoirs of an Imperfect Angel (2009)	Merry Christmas II You (2010)

Singles from Memoirs of an Imperfect Angel
- 1. "Obsessed" Released: June 16, 2009; 2. "I Want to Know What Love Is" Released: September 22, 2009; 3. "H.A.T.E.U." Released: November 1, 2009

Memoirs of an Imperfect Angel is the twelfth studio album by American singer-songwriter Mariah Carey. It was initially released in the Philippines and Hong Kong on September 28, 2009, and it was released on September 29, 2009 in the United States and Canada, by Island Records, Def Jam Recordings and The Island Def Jam Music Group. After promotion for her previous album, E=MC² (2008) ended, Carey began to work on a new album, producing songs with Terius "The-Dream" Nash and Christopher "Tricky" Stewart.

Four singles were released to promote the album. The lead single, "Obsessed", became the album's most successful song, peaking at number seven on the Billboard Hot 100, and reaching the top twenty in Japan, Canada and Australia and the top ten in Italy and France. The second single, "I Want to Know What Love Is", reached number 60 on the Billboard Hot 100, and topped the Brasil Hot 100 Airplay chart for 27 non-consecutive weeks. "H.A.T.E.U." was released as the third single. "It's a Wrap" was released as a promotional single in 2023 after going viral on video sharing platform TikTok.

Upon its release, Memoirs of an Imperfect Angel received positive reviews from music critics, who felt it was one of Carey's most consistent and interesting records. Commercially, the album debuted at number three on the Billboard 200 with 168,000 copies sold in its first week, and peaked within the top-ten in other five countries. To promote the album, Carey made a pre-show in Madison Square Garden in 2009, embarked on the Angels Advocate Tour (2010), and performed on several television programs, including America's Got Talent, The Oprah Winfrey Show and Today.

== Background and production ==
In early 2009, singer and songwriter The-Dream stated that he and Carey had already begun working on her next studio album: "I think it's about just writing an album that includes the focus of all the hits that she's had. She can't take a loss; she has to do everything to the T. So it's basically like we're trying to make a greatest hits album without using the greatest hits". In February 2009, The-Dream told to MySpace Music that he and Carey had finished seven songs for the album.

In May, Carey revealed that she was calling the album Memoirs of an Imperfect Angel because it was going to be "very personal and dedicated to the fans". She says that she chose to use three images for the cover art because "there are a lot of different emotions and stories revealed on this album". Carey also stated that she loves "the whole album" and she's "completely immersed in it". On June 16, Carey said on Twitter that there will be "big ballads" on the album. Carey also said that she "tried to make something for all who love Butterfly, and even older albums". For the first time in her career, Carey worked with American Grammy Award-winning hip-hop and R&B record-producer Timbaland. They worked on a number of tracks, but none were included on the album. Another song, "Imperfect," which was written by Carey and deals with societal pressure on women to "be perfect and look a certain way," also failed to make the track listing. In an interview with BET, Carey said that she worked with Jermaine Dupri, but none of his songs are on the album. Despite the majority of the project being written and produced by Carey, Tricky Stewart and The-Dream, the main goal was to avoid having a "redundant or stale" album. In an interview with Elle Carey described the sound of her new album: "Each song is its own snapshot of a moment in a story. But overall, the vibe is R&B hip-hop with a lot of slow jams. [...] Each song has its own mood; some flow seamlessly into each other, and that was the purpose, and others are very different. The album has a sense of humor, [you can hear me laughing out loud at certain points], but it also has deep and introspective moments."

== Concept and packaging ==
During an interview with music retailer Amazon, Carey revealed her inspiration and motivation for the album. "Each song tells its own story. Each one is like an intimate conversation or entry in a private diary. A lot of the songs reflect specific, different times in my life, actual events that happened to me, some of which are from way back in the past. Others were inspired by movies or from a friend of mine that may have told me their story. People can listen to it and pick out certain songs that mean something to them – women especially. It's about women's empowerment and overcoming certain things. It's fun too though. It's got a little bit of something for everybody".

Amazon revealed that the physical release of the album would come as a 3-panel softpack as opposed to the usual plastic CD casing. This was due to the inclusion of two discs, the first housed the album itself whilst the second housed an enhanced CD featuring the music video for lead single "Obsessed" as well as the video for "Obsessed" (official remix featuring Gucci Mane) and three other remixes. The packaging includes a 34-page Elle mini-magazine which takes an exclusive in-depth look at Carey's life and career. The mini-magazine is mixed in with lyrics and other traditional liner-note materials as well as upscale ads to cut the production costs of the booklet. The ad-supported booklets – available in a digital format for downloaders – appeared in the first one million US copies of the CD and the first 500,000 overseas.

It was also revealed that a limited edition collectors' version of the album would be released on October 20, 2009. It features the album and its bonus disc on both standard CDs and limited edition white vinyl LPs plus six rare lithographs, the limited edition Elle mini-magazine, a signature butterfly band and exclusively designed collector's box packaging.

== Composition and music ==
For Memoirs of an Imperfect Angel, Mariah Carey has collaborated primarily with the team of The-Dream and Tricky Stewart for songwriting and producing throughout the entire album. Mariel Concepcion of Billboard dubbed the album as a record for "big ballads and R&B tunes about love and heartbreak, while herself labelled it as "an R&B hip-hop album with a lot of slow jams." Lyrically, Sal Cinquemani of Slant Magazine described the album as a "breakup record," with Mariah "kicking all kinds of men to the curb (basically the whole album)." Jody Rosen of Rolling Stone saw the album as "a mix of love ballads and sassy breakup anthems," while Dan Gennoe wrote that the album's focus is on "sentimental simpering, bittersweet slow jams, tears, heartbreak and five octaves of love."

The album starts with "Betcha Gon' Know (The Prologue)", involving Mariah finding her man cheating on her with an unclothed woman and threatening to expose him on national television ("Oprah Winfrey whole segment, for real", she sings). The second track and album's lead-single "Obsessed" details anger and anxiety at being stalked, with a guy who is deceptively claiming he's had sex with her. Several critics believed that the "guy" in question was Eminem, who allegedly spread rumors about their involvement. "H.A.T.E.U." stands for "Having a Typical Emotional Upset", and it's a painfully slow track about the emotional torment of lovers being torn apart, while in "Candy Bling" she wishes she could relive happier times before cherished relationships ended. On "Ribbon," she sings, "You give my body chills/ … And boy I got your lovin' on my mind," while on "Inseparable", Mariah sings about true love alongside a thumbing bass. "It's a Wrap" has Mariah making sure a cheatin' ex knows it's over for good, while "Up Out My Face" shares lyrical similarities, with Mariah issuing a sassy kiss-off: "I thought we had something special/ That we had something good/ But I should've had another mechanic under my hood," she sings. The song's "reprise" follows, with a marching-band coda.

The track "More Than Just Friends" talks about reveling in the glory of love, with Mariah singing, "We can make love in Italy in the grotto," and poking fun at her own vocal signature (Love me down till I hit the top of my soprano," she coos). "The Impossible", which Mariah says is about her marriage to Nick Cannon, starts sweetly: "I looked in your heart/And saw all my dreams come true." It takes its cue from early-'90s group Jodeci's "Forever My Lady." She harbors hope for a broken relationship on "Angels Cry", with her staple high-pitched voice over piano and finger snaps, singing: "I'm willing to live and die for our love/Baby we can get back that shine". The album reaches its most painful moments in "Languishing", about being in a relationship with someone you still don't feel you know after many years. "Would you reach for me if you saw that I was languishing?," she wonders. The album closes with a cover of Foreigner's love-affirming, 1984 hit "I Want to Know What Love Is." Mariah's version features a gospel choir and whistle notes.

== Marketing and promotion ==
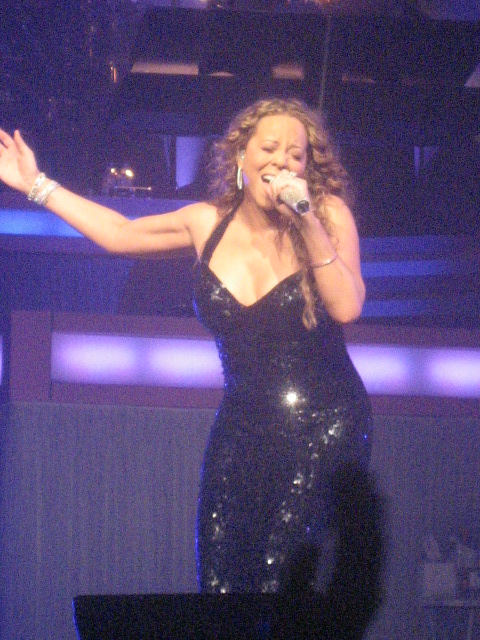
Carey (pictured) performing "We Belong Together" at the Angels Advocate Tour in 2010.

Carey first made a promotional appearance on August 2, 2009, on America's Got Talent, where she taped her performance of "Obsessed". The episode aired on August 5, 2009. The album was initially pushed back from August 25 to September 15 so that more recording in the studio could take place but it was then revealed that the album was to be pushed back once more to September 29, 2009, with all promotion being delayed so that Carey could put finishing touches to the album. As with most releases, the album was released several days earlier in international territories/markets. Since then the UK release was pushed back from August 24, to September 14, to October 5 and finally to November 16. British newspaper The Daily Mirror got a preview of six tracks on the album, these being "Obsessed", "Standing O", "Candy Bling", "H.A.T.E.U." (which stands for "Having A Typical Emotional Upset"), "Impossible" and a cover of Foreigner's "I Want to Know What Love Is". Media playbacks of these six tracks were held in Tokyo, Hong Kong, London and Berlin in August 2009.

Then in September, Carey began performing at her Live at the Pearl concerts in Las Vegas on September 10 and 11, where she sang several of her famous hits, the first two singles from Memoirs of an Imperfect Angel, "Obsessed" and "I Want to Know What Love Is" and premiering two other songs from the album, "Angels Cry" and "Up Out My Face". These were followed by appearing on The Oprah Winfrey Show on September 18, where Carey gave an interview with husband Nick Cannon and sang "I Want to Know What Love Is". On October 5, Carey performed a concert for select contest winners at the P.C. Richard Theater in TriBeCa, New York, where she sang "Obsessed", "H.A.T.E.U.", and "I Want to Know What Love Is" from the album. Also, she sang "Always Be My Baby" and "We Belong Together". Carey resumed her Las Vegas shows at Live at the Pearl concerts on October 9 and 10, this time changing the setlist and performing songs which she has either not sung live this millennium or debuting live performances of songs from previous albums. Carey also sang "H.A.T.E.U.", in order to promote it as her third single, in addition to "Obsessed" and "I Want To Know What Love Is".

Carey performed "I Want To Know What Love Is" on the Italian X Factor on November 11, 2009. and then her third single "H.A.T.E.U." on the Late Show with David Letterman on November 13, 2009. In the UK, she appeared on the Mariah Carey: T4 Special where she was interviewed, followed by a performance, on November 14, 2009, and then taped a performance of "I Want to Know What Love Is" which aired on November 22 on The X Factor. On November 19, 2009, she was interviewed and performed on the first show of the second series of Alan Carr's Chatty Man as well as switching on the Christmas lights at the Westfield shopping center in London. She then appeared on GMTV with Lorraine Kelly for an encore interview and performance of her album's UK lead single "I Want to Know What Love Is" and later in the week on daily entertainment show This Morning.

The Angels Advocate Tour in support of the album kicked off with a pre-tour show on December 31, 2009, at Madison Square Garden with Trey Songz before officially beginning on January 2, 2010, in Atlantic City, New Jersey. The tour is in support of Memoirs of an Imperfect Angel and will see Carey performing songs from past and present. The tour was speculated in November but not confirmed until December by Carey's official website.

=== Singles ===
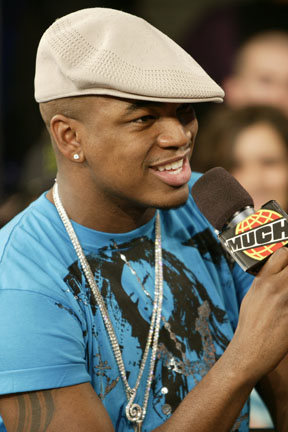
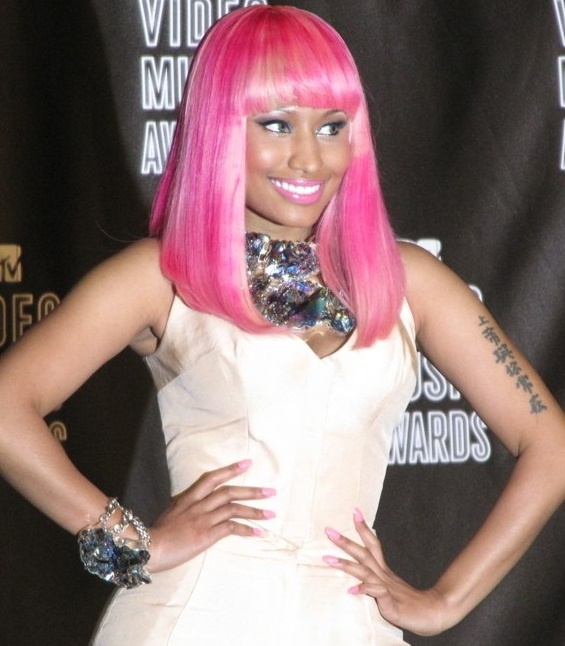
Ne-Yo (left) and Nicki Minaj (right) were featured on the remixes of "Angels Cry" and "Up Out My Face" respectively.

"Obsessed" was the album's lead single and premiered on June 16, 2009. It was released for digital download on July 6, 2009. The song debuted at number eleven on the Billboard Hot 100, making it Carey's highest debut on this chart since May 1998. It has since peaked at number seven giving Carey her 27th top ten hit in the US, the second among women (behind Madonna who has 38, the most for any artist) and the fifth among all.

"I Want to Know What Love Is", Carey's cover of Foreigner's hit, was announced as the album's second single. The song premiered to European radio on August 28, 2009 and US radio on September 14, 2009. It was released to US iTunes on September 22, 2009. The song failed to climb further than number 60 on the Billboard Hot 100 despite being successful on Adult Contemporary radio, reaching No. 10 on the AC chart. The song was more successful in Europe. It entered at number 6 in France and became the highest charting version of the song there, and reached number 16 on the European Hot 100. It also reached a peak of 3 in Japan and number 1 in Brazil for 27 consecutive weeks.

"H.A.T.E.U." was the third single from the album. It was only released in the US. It was made available for radio airplay on November 3, 2009. The song debuted at 76 on the Hot R&B/Hip-Hop Songs chart on October 22, 2009, over a week and a half before its official radio release.

"Up Out My Face" featuring Nicki Minaj was released to radio on January 26, 2010, with its video release a day later through Vevo. The single was released as a digital download in the US and Europe on February 16, 2010. It peaked at 152 in Korea, and charted in the US at 100 on the Billboard Hot 100. It fared better on the Hot R&B/Hip Hop Songs chart reaching 39.

"Angels Cry" featuring Ne-Yo was released to radio on January 26, 2010, and had its video release on January 27 on Vevo. It was released in the US, Australia, New Zealand and Japan on February 23, 2010. Despite being slated for release in the UK on March 29, 2010, it has not appeared on any of the major retailers' websites. It peaked at No. 72 in Korea, and No. 89 in Japan. It also reached #26 on the Adult Contemporary Songs and number No. 90 on the Hot R&B/Hip Hop Songs chart.

=== Angels Advocate ===
In October 2009, Tricky Stewart revealed to Rap Up magazine that there were plans for a Memoirs of an Imperfect Angel remix album to be titled Angels Advocate. Stewart described the album as a "features album" which was otherwise "the exact same album" as Memoirs of an Imperfect Angel. The album would include a Tricky Stewart remix of "I Want to Know What Love Is" as well as the remix to "Obsessed" which features Gucci Mane and a remix of "Inseparable" featuring Trey Songz. Jermaine Dupri was one of several new producers for the project and helmed the remix of "H.A.T.E.U." which samples Ghost Town DJs' "My Boo" and features rap verses from Big Boi (of Outkast), Gucci Mane, and OJ da Juiceman. It was first time since 2006's So So Def remix to "Say Somethin'" that Carey had recorded new vocals for a remix. New versions of the songs "Betcha Gon' Know (The Prologue)" and "Candy Bling" respectively featured R. Kelly and T-Pain. The latter also sampled a sped-up melody from Jamie Foxx's "Blame It". The single versions of "Up Out My Face" featuring Nicki Minaj and "Angels Cry" featuring Ne-Yo were slated to appear on the record.

The purpose of the album was to ensure that Memoirs appealed to a wider audience by putting guest artists on 90% of the songs. Carey was also planning to collaborate with Westlife, which would have been exclusive to the UK version of the album and a future single release. Throughout the development of the project, Carey regularly updated fans through her Twitter account. She stated that there were several previously unreleased tracks from Memoirs that would appear on the project, including one Dupri song and several Timbaland songs. Swizz Beatz was also linked to several productions for the project, whilst Yahoo! music linked Snoop Dogg and Fabolous to remixes. Finally, a press release also confirmed contributions from Mary J. Blige ("It's a Wrap"), The-Dream and Ludacris ("Ribbon"), Akon, K-Ci & JoJo.

Island Records announced on a press release that Angels Advocate would be released on March 30, 2010. However, Carey's manager Chris Lighty eventually confirmed the album's cancellation due to the underwhelming performance of the Memoirs of an Imperfect Angel album. It had been slated as an exclusive iTunes Store and Target release in the US before cancellation. The MC vs JS album, which was scheduled for release around the same time, was also subsequently cancelled. Two of the planned tracks for Angels Advocate were included on the deluxe edition of Carey's fourteenth studio album Me. I Am Mariah... The Elusive Chanteuse (2014) – a duet with R. Kelly on "Betcha Gon' Know" and the previously announced duet with Mary J. Blige on "It's a Wrap".

== Critical reception ==
Memoirs of an Imperfect Angel ratings
Aggregate scores
Source	Rating
AnyDecentMusic?	4.9/10
Metacritic	70/100
Review scores
Source	Rating
AllMusic	3.5/5 stars
The A.V. Club	B−
Entertainment Weekly	B
The Guardian	4/5 stars
Los Angeles Times	2.5/4 stars
Newsday	C
NME	5/10
Rolling Stone	3.5/4 stars
Slant Magazine	3/5 stars
The Sunday Times	1/5 stars

Memoirs of an Imperfect Angel received generally positive reviews from music critics. At Metacritic, which assigns a normalized rating out of 100 to reviews from music critics, the album received an average score of 70, based on 13 reviews, indicating generally favorable reviews. The score is higher than her previous albums The Emancipation of Mimi and E=MC^{2}.

AllMusic gave the album three and a half stars (out of five) and called it "her most interesting album in a decade", commenting that "Even if it doesn't smack of the confessional autobiography of the title, there's no denying that Memoirs is an album, not a collection of tracks, possessing its own flow and mood, which gives it a personality the slightly desperate E=MC2 lacked" though "it never manages to kick out a song that is all that distinctive on its own terms". Another critic pointed out that the album lacks "the pandering, heavy-handed sexuality Mariah has relied upon too heavily this decade – and in doing so, it feels age appropriate in a way she hasn't in a long time, despite a collection of silly, jumbled lyrics". The A.V. Club also gave the album a positive review with a grade of B−, commenting, "Their team-up with Carey is canny: Stewart and Nash loosen up the diva's sometimes overblown on-record persona, and in return she gives definition to some of their more meandering tunes and backdrops. Memoirs is Carey's least pyrotechnic album, its flow is as important as its tunes, and while Carey is still given to acrobatic vocal displays, her lattice of subtler vocal overdubs softens and strengthens those flights."

A mixed review came from Slant Magazine, in which music critic Sal Cinquemani called the album "one of her most sonically consistent". However, finding the album "soulless", he noted that the aural similarity of the tracks led to the production sounding "cheap and same-y, lacking the fullness of her best work". He continues, "Mariah is in fine voice throughout the album, and there are plenty of inspired moments to be found... Which makes it all the more disappointing that the album's final stretch devolves into a mess of old-school Mariah rehashes that should have been left in the past." Entertainment Weekly music critic Leah Greenblatt gave Memoirs of an Imperfect Angel a B, noting that the album neither impresses nor disappoints, but is merely satisfactory: "imperfections are nowhere to be found on Memoirs, but neither are many true revelations." Robert Christgau once again gave the album a "dud" score.

Jon Caramanica from The New York Times gave the album a mixed review, writing that the album "manages simplicity and clutter all at once". Caramanica also criticized Carey's vocal performances, decrying her overuse of her softer vocal registers at the expense of her more powerful lower and mid registers: "When exactly did Mariah Carey stop singing? Even when she began flirting aggressively with hip-hop in the mid-1990s she was happy to impose her titanic vocals atop even the scrappiest production... Of late though, Ms. Carey has been whispering, as if newly scared of grand gestures." A positive review came from Billboard music critic Mariel Concepcion, who wrote that "Mariah Carey is not only revisiting her past appearance-wise, but she's also taking her sound back to her R&B roots...Overall, Carey's throwback vibe on Memoirs is refreshing and much welcomed."

=== Year-end lists ===
Publication	Accolade	Rank	Ref.
Associated Press (Nekesa Mumbi Moody)	The Top 10 Albums of 2009	4	
Pitchfork (Christopher Owens)	The 10 Best Albums of 2009	10	
Shepherd Express	The Best R&B Albums of 2009	—N/a	

=== Accolades ===
Year	Region	Award	Category	Result
2010	United States	NAACP Image Awards	Outstanding Album	Nominated

== Commercial performance ==
The album debuted in the US at number three on the Billboard 200. It opened with first week sales of 168,000 units. The album was certified Gold on December 14, 2009, denoting shipments of 500,000 units, but it became Carey's lowest-selling album since Glitter in 2001. The album topped the R&B/Hip-Hop Albums chart. As of November 2018, the album has sold 555,000 copies in the US. It has since been certified platinum by the Recording Industry Association of America (RIAA), denoting sales and shipments equivalent to one million units. In Canada the album debuted at number 5 on the Canadian Albums Chart. The album reached #101 in the 2009 year-end Billboard 200 albums chart. In Japan the album reached #9. In the UK the album undersold expectations, peaking at number 23, in the Christmas season despite a performance on The X Factor and visiting various morning shows. Despite this, it received a Silver certification for shipments of 60,000. It peaked at number eight on the UK R&B Albums Chart.

== Track listing ==
All tracks are written by and produced by Mariah Carey, Christopher "Tricky" Stewart, and Terius "The-Dream" Nash, except where noted.

Memoirs of an Imperfect Angel – Standard edition
No.	Title	Writer(s)	Producer(s)	Length
1.	"Betcha Gon' Know (The Prologue)"	Carey; Stewart; Nash; Big Jim Wright	Carey; Stewart; Nash; Wright	4:00
2.	"Obsessed"			4:02
3.	"H.A.T.E.U."			4:28
4.	"Candy Bling"	Carey; Nash; Carlos McKinney; Ahmad Lewis; Stefan Gordy; John Klemmer	Carey; Nash; Los da Mystro	4:03
5.	"Ribbon"			4:21
6.	"Inseparable"	Carey; Stewart; Nash; Robert Hyman; Cyndi Lauper		3:34
7.	"Standing O"			4:00
8.	"It's a Wrap"	Carey; Barry White	Carey; Heatmyzer; Stewart; Wright	3:59
9.	"Up Out My Face"			3:41
10.	"Up Out My Face (The Reprise)"			0:51
11.	"More than Just Friends"	Carey; Stewart; Nash; Sean Combs; Chris Wallace; Rashad Smith; Mark DeBarge; Etterlene Jordan		3:37
12.	"The Impossible"	Carey; Stewart; Nash; Albert Brown; Donald DeGrate		4:00
13.	"The Impossible (The Reprise)"			2:26
14.	"Angel (The Prelude)"	Carey; Stewart; Wright	Carey; Stewart; Wright	1:04
15.	"Angels Cry"	Carey; Stewart; Crystal Johnson; Wright	Carey; Stewart; Wright	4:02
16.	"Languishing (The Interlude)"	Carey; Wright	Carey; Wright	2:34
17.	"I Want to Know What Love Is"	Mick Jones	Carey; Stewart; Wright; Randy Jackson (add.)	3:27
Total length:				58:01

Memoirs of an Imperfect Angel – CD and digital release (bonus disc)
No.	Title	Length
1.	"Obsessed" (Cahill Radio Mix)	3:21
2.	"Obsessed" (Seamus Haji & Paul Emanuel Radio Edit)	3:12
3.	"Obsessed" (Jump Smokers Radio Edit)	3:20
4.	"Obsessed" (Friscia and Lamboy Radio Mix)	4:11
Total length:		14:04

Memoirs of an Imperfect Angel – Enhanced CD and digital store edition (bonus videos)
No.	Title	Length
5.	"Obsessed" (video)	4:04
6.	"Obsessed" (video) (featuring Gucci Mane)	4:25

=== Sample credits ===
- "Candy Bling" contains a sample of "Back in the Day", written by Ahmad Lewis, Stefan Gordy and John Klemmer.
- "Inseparable" interpolates "Time After Time", written by Robert Hyman and Cyndi Lauper.
- "It's a Wrap" recreates elements of "I Belong to You" by The Love Unlimited Orchestra, written by Barry White.
- "More Than Just Friends" samples "One More Chance" / "Stay with Me (Remix)", written by Sean Combs, Chris Wallace, Rashad Smith, Mark DeBarge and Etterlene Jordan.
- "The Impossible" and "The Impossible (The Reprise)" contain interpolations of "Forever My Lady" written by Albert Brown and Donald DeGrate.

== Personnel ==
- Kristofer Buckle – make-up
- Mariah Carey – executive producer, vocal, producer
- Carol Corless – package production
- Jaycen-Joshua Fowler – mixing
- Brian Gardner – mastering (at Bernie Grundman Mastering, Los Angeles)
- Chris "Tek" O'Ryan – sound engineer
- Terius "The-Dream" Nash – producer
- Oribe – hair
- Dave Pensando – mixing
- Antonio "L.A." Reid – co-executive producer
- Garrett Schaeffer – product manager
- Christopher "Tricky Stewart" – producer, organ, keyboard
- Phil Tan – mixing
- Michael Thompson – design photography
- Andy West – art direction and design
- James "Big Jim" Wright – organ, keyboards, producer
- Kristen Yiengst – art and photography coordination

== Charts ==
=== Weekly charts ===
Memoirs of an Imperfect Angel weekly chart performance
Chart (2009–2010)	Peak position
Australian Albums (ARIA)	6
Austrian Albums (Ö3 Austria)	39
Belgian Albums (Ultratop Flanders)	44
Belgian Albums (Ultratop Wallonia)	24
Canadian Albums (Billboard)	5
Croatian International Albums (HDU)	20
Czech Albums (ČNS IFPI)	27
Danish Albums (Hitlisten)	5
Dutch Albums (Album Top 100)	26
European Albums (Top 100)	21
French Albums (SNEP)	10
German Albums (Offizielle Top 100)	27
Hungarian Albums (MAHASZ)	32
Irish Albums (IRMA)	80
Italian Albums (FIMI)	17
Japanese Albums (Oricon)	9
Mexican Albums (AMPROFON)	49
New Zealand Albums (RMNZ)	25
Scottish Albums (Official Charts)	44
South Korean International Albums (Circle)	79
Spanish Albums (Promusicae)	23
Swedish Albums (Sverigetopplistan)	44
Swiss Albums (Schweizer Hitparade)	18
Taiwanese Albums (Five Music)	2
UK Albums (Official Charts)	23
UK R&B Albums (Official Charts)	8
US Billboard 200	3
US Top R&B/Hip-Hop Albums (Billboard)	1

=== Year-end charts ===
Memoirs of an Imperfect Angel year-end chart performance
Chart (2009)	Position
US Billboard 200	101
US Top R&B/Hip-Hop Albums (Billboard)	44
Chart (2010)	Position
US Top R&B/Hip-Hop Albums (Billboard)	40

== Certifications and sales ==
Memoirs of an Imperfect Angel certifications
Region	Certification	Certified units/sales
Brazil (Pro-Música Brasil)	Gold	30,000^{*}
New Zealand (RMNZ)	Gold	7,500^{‡}
Singapore (RIAS)	Gold	5,000^{*}
United Kingdom (BPI)	Silver	80,308
United States (RIAA)	Platinum	1,000,000^{‡}
Summaries
Worldwide	—	2,000,000
^{*} Sales figures based on certification alone.^{‡} Sales+streaming figures based on certification alone.

== Release history ==
Memoirs of an Imperfect Angel release history
Region	Date	Format	Label	Catalogue	Ref.
Hong Kong	September 28, 2009	Standard edition (CD, digital)	Universal Music	2720462	
Philippines	September 28, 2009	Standard edition (CD, digital)	MCA Music	2720462	
United States	September 29, 2009	Standard edition (CD, digital)	Island	602527133652	
Canada	September 29, 2009	Standard edition (CD, digital)	Universal Music	B001322602	
Taiwan	September 29, 2009	Standard edition (CD, digital)	Universal Music	2720462	
Denmark	September 30, 2009	Standard edition (CD, digital)	Universal Music	060252720462	
Finland	September 30, 2009	Standard edition (CD, digital)	Universal Music	060252720462	
Sweden	September 30, 2009	Standard edition (CD, digital)	Universal Music	060252720462	
Netherlands	October 2, 2009	Standard edition (CD, digital)	Universal Music	060252720462	
Norway	October 2, 2009	Standard edition (CD, digital)	Universal Music	060252720462	
Germany	October 2, 2009	Standard edition (CD, digital)	Universal Music	060252720462	
Italy	October 2, 2009	Standard edition (CD, digital)	Universal Music	060252720462	
Australia	October 2, 2009	Standard edition (CD, digital)	Universal Music	060252720462	
Japan	October 3, 2009	Standard edition (CD, digital)	Universal Music	UICL9079	
France	October 5, 2009	Standard edition (CD, digital)	Universal Music	060252720462	
Brazil	October 24, 2009	Standard edition (CD, digital)	Universal Music	602527205489	
United States	October 27, 2009	Collectors edition (box set)	Island	602527142166	
Poland	November 3, 2009	Standard edition (CD, Digital)	Universal Music	060252720462	
United Kingdom	November 22, 2009	Standard edition (Digital)	Mercury Records	060252715927	
United Kingdom	November 23, 2009	Standard edition (CD)	Mercury Records	060252721461	
Ireland	November 23, 2009	Standard edition (CD)	Mercury Records	060252720462	

== See also ==
- List of most expensive albums
