= Obsessed (Mariah Carey song) =

2009 single by Mariah Carey

Single by Mariah Carey

from the album Memoirs of an Imperfect Angel
- Released: June 16, 2009
- Recorded: 2009
- Studio: Honeywest Studios (New York City); The Boom Boom Room (Burbank, California)
- Genre: Hip hop; R&B
- Length: 4:02
- Label: Island
- Songwriters: Mariah Carey; Christopher Stewart; Terius Nash
- Producers: Mariah Carey; Tricky Stewart; The-Dream

Mariah Carey singles chronology
| "My Love" (2009) | "Obsessed" (2009) | "I Want to Know What Love Is" (2009) |

Music videos
- "Obsessed" on YouTube; "Obsessed" (remix) on YouTube

"Obsessed" is a song by American singer-songwriter Mariah Carey from her twelfth studio album, Memoirs of an Imperfect Angel (2009). The song was written and produced by Carey, Tricky Stewart and The-Dream, and was released as the album's lead single on June 16, 2009, by Island Records. The song draws musical influences from contemporary R&B and hip hop, and is built around a thumping bassline. Additionally, the song is accentuated by hand claps, while Carey's voice is processed with Auto-Tune. Lyrically, the song describes Carey's dilemma regarding constant claims of a prior relationship from rapper Eminem, although he is not specifically mentioned.

The song received generally positive reception from music critics. Some praised the song itself, highlighting it as a stand-out track from Memoirs of an Imperfect Angel and complimenting its clever lyrics and strong beat while others criticized the usage of Auto-Tune on Carey's vocals. At the time of the song's release, "Obsessed" was the center of controversy, as critics and the media suggested Carey was aiming it at Eminem, who had negatively referenced her several times in his songs. Eminem released a song called "The Warning" in response.

"Obsessed" peaked at number seven on the US Billboard Hot 100, becoming Carey's 27th top ten hit, tying her with Janet Jackson and Elton John in the fifth place as the artists with the most top ten hits on the chart. Internationally, the song was not released throughout parts of Europe, as Island Records decided to give priority to the album's second single, Carey's cover of Foreigner's hit "I Want to Know What Love Is". "Obsessed" peaked within the top-ten in France and Italy; and in the top 20 in Australia, Belgium, Canada and Japan.

The accompanying music video for "Obsessed" was directed by Brett Ratner, who Carey has previously worked with on many of her videos. Throughout the video, Carey plays both herself and the character of the male stalker, dressed in a bellhop uniform, as well as a gray hoodie and sweatpants. Two videos were filmed for "Obsessed", one for the original version and one for the remixed version, which features rapper Gucci Mane. The video was shot predominantly at the Plaza Hotel and on the streets of New York City. After several photographs of Carey dressed as the stalker were leaked, tabloids immediately compared Carey's costume to Eminem's usual attire. Carey performed the song live on the fourth season of America's Got Talent, Today, and throughout her Angels Advocate Tour (2009–10). Both the song and video contain references to the 2004 film Mean Girls, starring Lindsay Lohan.

== Background ==
"The most anticipated is the Mariah project, and she just released a fire record in the building today. And we have been blasting it out all day. It's just fucking retarded. I don't think anybody is going to expect her to come out punching like she is going to come out. But she got a record. It's going to light the blogs up too because you don't know who she talking about, what she talking about, but she talking about something. And remember The-Dream told you first. So you can start that up right now. Mariah Carey has a record, and somebody's going to be very upset. I said that."

— The-Dream, discussing "Obsessed" prior to its release

In 2008, Carey had suddenly cancelled a concert tour supporting her eleventh studio album, E=MC². There was heavy speculation in the media that Carey had become pregnant, and had abandoned the plans for a tour as a result. The singer had later admitted that she was pregnant during that time period, and had suffered a miscarriage, leading to the cancellation of the tour.

Carey then opted to record a new album, that would be released during the summer of 2009. During the later stages of the project, Carey released the title, Memoirs of an Imperfect Angel, that would serve as the singer's twelfth studio album. She explained how plans for a ballad to be released were put on hold, because a new song she had written "needed to be heard". On June 9, 2009, she wrote on her official Twitter account: "Seriously, this is one of my favorite songs ever. I love the whole album. I'm completely immersed in it. I can't wait for you to hear it", and announced its title as "Obsessed". Later that week, The-Dream, who co-wrote the song with Carey, claimed that the song was definitely aimed at someone in particular, and that it would upset them greatly. The song was transmitted digitally to radio stations on June 16, 2009, for immediate airplay and made its debut on Chicago radio station B96 at 2:00 pm. An official remix of the song, featuring rapper Gucci Mane, premiered on the same day.

== Artwork ==
The single cover artwork for "Obsessed" features Carey leaning against a dirty concrete wall. She is shown wearing black underwear and a matching sheer top, with a black bra visible through the shirt. Carey's hair is featured in a long and wet style, cascading over her shoulders and right breast. The word "Obsessed" is written in large white letters over Carey's body. An anonymous writer for MTV described it as "wet and raunchy", while writing, "As you can see here the star has chosen a sexy shot to launch material from her next album. Mariah is shown busting out of a revealing black top and wearing black underwear."

== Controversy ==
=== Background ===
In 2001, Carey decided to venture into the film industry with her debut acting role, Glitter. It was a critical and commercial failure, which led to Carey's $100 million recording contract being bought out by Virgin Records, who paid her $49 million to part ways. Carey also had personal life conflicts and erratic behavior in public appearances, leading to the singer being hospitalized. During this period in Carey's personal life, American rapper Eminem claimed to date Carey for six months. After this Eminem referred to Carey in several of his songs in a negative light, feeling angered by her disowning their alleged relationship. The back-and-forth through songs continued with "Clown" on Carey's album Charmbracelet, her 2001 interview tapes being faked as voice recordings being played at Eminem's Anger Management Tour. After playing the excerpt, Eminem would pretend to be sick before launching into his song "Puke".

On May 15, 2009, Eminem released his sixth studio album, Relapse, which included a song titled "Bagpipes from Baghdad" in which he addresses Mariah's denial that their relationship ever happened. In the lyrics, Eminem expresses that he's not done talking about the subject: "I want another crack at ya" and "Nick Cannon better back the fuck up. I'm not playing, I want her back, you punk." After the song's release, Cannon went on his website, defending Carey and expressing his disgust at Eminem's comments. Following Cannon's comments, Eminem responded sarcastically. He clarified that the song was actually "wishing the couple the best", and that it was a misunderstanding. In an interview with BBC Radio, Eminem clarified that although contained a "harsh" line, he meant well. He later commented that he respected Cannon for his response, and that he expected him to stand up for his wife.

=== Aftermath ===
After Carey premiered "Obsessed" on June 16, 2009, the media frenzied and began speculating the song was targeting at Eminem, due to its lyrics and overall message. Following the song's accompanying music video, which featured Carey playing a role that resembled the rapper, critics considered it Carey's response to Eminem's "Bagpipes from Baghdad". Soon after both the song and video's release, the rapper released another song, titled "The Warning" on July 30, 2009, which he claimed to be a retaliation. The song's lyrics allude to his supposed relationship with the singer, the music video for "Obsessed", and pictures and proof he claims to have of the couple. The song begins "Only reason I dissed you in the first place is because you denied seeing me. Now I'm pissed off", before describing Carey's impersonation of him in her video, "Oh gee, is that supposed to be me in the video with the goatee?/ Wow Mariah, didn't expect ya to go balls out." Eminem continues describing a near-sexual encounter with the singer, threatening to release voice-mails and pictures he still has in his possession. Additionally, the song features a female's voice, unknown whether or not Carey's, where she calls herself Mary Poppins, as well as several intervals of her laughter. In the aftermath of the releases, Cannon was questioned regarding the inspiration of "Obsessed", and whether it was ever directed at Eminem:

She's Mariah Carey. She's not beefin', she's a vegetarian. People keep saying ['Obsessed'] was directed at certain people. To be completely honest, she did the record 'cause she's a huge fan of this movie Mean Girls, and there's a line in the movie where one of the girls is like, 'Why are you so obsessed with me?' She says that at the beginning of the song, and that's where the concept came from. But, you know, art imitates life.

== Composition ==
"Obsessed"
A sample of "Obsessed"; its built around a "thumping bass line", and features a "distorted wordless vocal hook". Additionally, the song is accentuated by hand claps, while Carey's voice is set with auto-tune.

"Obsessed" draws influences from the R&B and hip hop music genres. The song is built around a "thumping bass line", and features a "distorted wordless vocal hook" as its instrumentation. Additionally, the song is accentuated by hand claps, while Carey's voice is set with auto-tune. Joey Guerra of the Houston Chronicle described the song's production as "an auto-tune orgy of come-hither vocals and cutesy Mariah-isms." According to the sheet music published at Musicnotes.com by Sony/ATV Music Publishing, "Obsessed" is set in common time with a tempo of 84 beats per minute. It is composed in the key of C minor, the melody spanning from B♭_{3} to C_{5}, with Carey's harmonies stretching up to C_{7}. Written and produced by Carey, The-Dream and Tricky Stewart, the song's chord progression revolves around alternating A♭ major and C minor chords. Lyrically, the song describes the protagonists dilemma regarding a stalker, and finds her asking him regarding his obsession.

After the song's release, critics heavily compared its lyrics to Eminem, and suggested Carey alluded to him and his 'obsession' with her. "Obsessed" never mentions the rapper's name, although reviewers felt it to be very obvious. The song begins with "I was like, 'Why are you so obsessed with me?'", before the music begins. This line references the 2004 film Mean Girls. As the first verse begins, Carey describes the tracks' subjects constant lies: "All up in the blogs sayin' we met at a bar / When I don't even, know who you are / Sayin' you up in my house sayin' you up in my car / When you in L.A. and I'm at Jermaine's". Additionally, the song suggests the stalker is under the influence of drugs: It must be the weed, it must be the E / 'Cause you be poppin', heard you get it poppin'." During the chorus, Carey confronts her stalker, asking: Why are you so obsessed with me / Boy I wanna know / Lying that your sexing with me / When everybody knows/ It's clear that you're upset with me / Oh, Oh, Oh, finally found a girl that you couldn't impress / last man on the earth still couldn't get this." During the song's second verse, critics complimented Carey's lyrics, highlighting phrases such as: You're a mom & pop, I'm a corporation / I'm the press conference, you're a conversation", "suggesting the rapper isn't a worthy suitor". The super clean version of the song which has the same time length as the album version, have the words "E" and "weed" being omitted. Two individual garble sound effects were used for the removed lyrics.

== Critical reception ==
Professional ratings
Review scores
| Source | Rating |
|---|---|
| BBC Radio 1 | 3/5 stars |
| Digital Spy | 3/5 stars |
| Stereogum | 8/10 |

"Obsessed" received widespread acclaim from music critics upon release. While most reviewers complimented the song's lyrics and production, some criticized Carey for her usage of intentional auto-tune. Daniel Kreps from Rolling Stone stated that "the biting mid-tempo track is already more musically and lyrically engrossing than E=MC²'s singles." The A.V. Club's Michaelangelo Matos complimented the song's clever lyrics, and called it a "wicked diss of an unnamed Eminem for spreading rumors about their involvement." Though criticizing Memoirs of an Imperfect Angel for being full of mid-tempo numbers, James Reed from The Boston Globe felt "Obsessed" "stood out of the goo", due to its witty lyrics and strong beat production. Monica Herrera of Billboard gave the song a positive review, describing it as a "gem of a diss record that coasts, even over its sputtering moans and synth jabs." Additionally, Herrera complimented Carey's lyrics, calling them "bity and funny".

Entertainment Weekly's Leah Greenblatt described the track as a "brash synth kiss-off", while Alex Macpherson from The Guardian called it "jaunty" and "wisecracking". On "Obsessed", Sal Cinquemani from Slant Magazine felt the "attitude is sexy", while Jon Caramanica from The New York Times felt the song was a stand-out track from the album, which he felt was "dated". He described that although the entire album was produced by Carey, The-Dream and Tricky Stewart, which he described as "masters of compensation, helping elevate mediocre singers — like The-Dream himself or Rihanna, on 'Umbrella' — to something sublime", "Obsessed" sounded "Dr. Dre-esque, and felt it was a notable exception from the rest of Memoirs of an Imperfect Angel. Los Angeles Times's Ann Powers described it as an "aggressive track", while Lauren Carter of the Boston Herald wrote "Carey's musical stiff-arm ends with some vocal acrobatics to let us know she's still got it. Expect to get 'Obsessed' this summer."

MTV News rated the song as one of the contenders for the "best of the summer", writing "Mimi returns, this time with an Auto-Tuned kiss-off to wannabe lotharios (and Eminem?) that will probably be the soundtrack to a million summer hookups and just as many public-intoxication collars. Glossy, flossy and decidedly "urban", Mariah strikes back. Your radio has been warned. AllMusic critic Stephen Thomas Erlewine chose the song as a "top pick" from Memoirs of an Imperfect Angel, while Amos Barshad of The New York Times listed it as the fifth top song of the summer. In contrast, "Obsessed" received a mixed review from the Los Angeles Times writer, Todd Martens, who wrote that although "its feistier Mimi than [they]'re used to", she ultimately "has been molded to fit current trends" and that the single "again sells out the songbird to her producers." At the ASCAP 27th Annual Pop Music Awards, "Obsessed" won "Most Performed Song".

== Commercial performance ==
"Obsessed" debuted at number 11 on the Billboard Hot 100, with sales of 119,266 digital downloads, making it Carey's highest debut in over a decade, since "My All" (1998). This marked her 40th entry on the Hot 100, making her just the eighth woman in the chart's history to make 40 or more appearances. The song peaked at number seven on the Hot 100, becoming her 27th top ten hit, and her only one to miss the top five. The song stayed in the top 40 for 20 weeks, longer than her number-one hit "Touch My Body" (2008). In terms of total top 10 chart entries amongst all artists in the chart's history, Carey is now tied for fifth place with Janet Jackson and Elton John; she additionally tied with Jackson as the female artists with the second most top ten hits after Madonna. The song made an early debut at number 52 on the Hot R&B/Hip-Hop Songs chart and has since peaked at number 12, marking Carey's 40th chart entry and placing her in second place for most charted songs among women in the 1990s and 2000s (decade) (the first being Mary J. Blige). Carey made her 29th appearance on the Pop Songs/Mainstream Top 40 radio chart, with "Obsessed" debuting at number 39, and peaking at eight. The arrival extends her lead for the most overall chart entries in the tally's then 17-year history.

On August 11, 2009, it was announced that the single would be released as a CD single at Wal-Mart store locations in the United States, her first commercial single release physically since 2002 in the country. The CD single was released early at various Wal-Mart store locations, however selling enough copies an entire week before its release date to debut at number one on the Billboard Hot Singles Sales chart, where it remained for four consecutive weeks on the chart. On December 6, 2024, "Obsessed" was certified 4× Platinum by the Recording Industry Association of America (RIAA), denoting shipments of over 4,000,000 units. This marked Carey's 12th platinum single, more than any other female artist in history. According to Nielsen SoundScan, "Obsessed" has sold over 1,742,000 copies in the United States as of July 2013. On the Canadian Hot 100, the song peaked at number 20, and spent only four weeks within the singles chart.

Internationally, the song achieved moderate charting due to its limited release. It was not released commercially throughout Europe, in order to give way for the album's second single, Carey's cover of Foreigner's classic "I Want to Know What Love Is". On July 26, 2009, the song debuted at number 26 on the Australian Singles Chart. "Obsessed" peaked at number 13 in the following weeks, placing higher than "Touch My Body" (#17 in 2008), and spent a total of 13 weeks on the chart. "Obsessed" was certified Gold by the Australian Recording Industry Association (ARIA), denoting shipments of over 35,000 units. In France, "Obsessed" debuted at its peak position of number eight, during the week dated September 26, 2009. The song charted for a total of 23 weeks, before dropping out on February 27, 2010. Similarly, the song peaked at number six on the Italian Singles Chart on July 16, as well as number 61 on the Dutch Top 40 on September 5, 2009. On both the Japan Hot 100 and New Zealand Singles Chart, "Obsessed" peaked at numbers 16 and 21, while spending four weeks on both charts, respectively. In the United Kingdom, "Obsessed" was lined up to be released in August before the release of Memoirs of an Imperfect Angel, but was pushed back several times and was ultimately cancelled in October, despite receiving heavy radio and video airplay. After the album was released, the song peaked at number 52 from downloads alone.

== Remixes ==
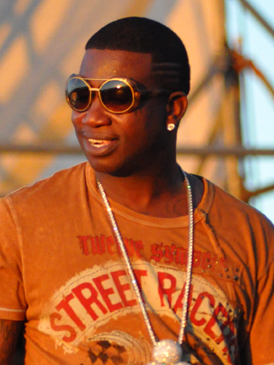
Gucci Mane (pictured) was featured on the remix of the song

On June 16, 2009, an accompanying remix featuring rapper Gucci Mane was released alongside the original. The song kept to its original arrangement and vocals, only adding ad libs throughout the song, as well as adding a new intro and replacing the bridge with another verse by Mane. Two days before the remix's release, Jasmine Dotiwala, Carey's longtime friend tweeted regarding it, saying "Listening to 'Obsessed' remix on repeat, -guest rapper-cant tell u who it is but he put the G in Ghetto! Sick combo-hotness." In an interview with MTV News, Mane described the remix as his "biggest collaboration yet":

Shout-out to Mariah Carey and her whole squad and my boy Chris Lighty. He got me and Mariah together. I appreciate it. He put me on there as well as her. Both of them are smart for doing that. The song came out hard. Mariah knew I wanted to do a song with her. It finally happened, and it turned out hard. I just flew up there to New York, went in the studio with her. I flew right out and went back on the road. When I do a song with people, I like to really get in the studio with them so I could feel they swag and they could feel mine. The music comes out better.

Gucci Mane mentioned in his book, The Autobiography of Gucci Mane, that Mariah Carey wanted him to fly out to New York City just to meet her, but when he got to the studio she wasn't there. Mane first thought that it was a waste of time and he could have easily done the song from Atlanta. He was ready to leave after finishing his verse on the song when Carey appeared and it seemed like she had been there the whole time waiting for him to finish. Carey loved Mane's verse and even asked for his advice on some of the other songs she had for her upcoming album.

Aside from the primary remix, Memoirs of an Imperfect Angel included four additional remixes that were released on a separate CD along with the original. It was packaged in a separate sleeve, and included the remix featuring Mane, and versions done by Jump Smokers, Cahill, Seamus Haji & Paul Emanuel and Friscia & Lamboy.

== Music video ==
=== Background and development ===
The song's music video was directed by Brett Ratner, who had previously worked with Carey on six other music videos, and was shot from June 28 to 29, 2009. The super clean version of the song was used in the first music video. Throughout the video, Carey plays herself and a male stalker, dressed as both a bellhop and a man wearing a gray hoodie and sweatpants. Two videos were shot for "Obsessed", one for the original version, and one for the remixed version, which features Gucci Mane. The video was shot predominantly at the Plaza Hotel, and on the streets of New York City. After several photographs of Carey dressed as the stalker were leaked, critics and bloggers immediately compared Carey's costume to Eminem's usual attire, and many wrote that aside from the goatee, the pair looked alike. Carey tweeted "I am not at any point in the video playing a specific person. I'm dressed as a 'stalker' in 3 different ensembles." Carey also revealed that the music video would reference several of her favorite films, such as Mean Girls (2004), with the line "Why are you so obsessed with me?", as well as The Devil Wears Prada (2006).

In an interview with MTV News, Carey described going under-cover as the stalker role: "Well, we had a lot of people outside. I'm walking up to the Plaza [Hotel], and when I was dressed as Mariah Carey, there were a lot of people just standing there taking pictures, and the street was closed down, and it was a whole rigmarole. It is what it is. So, basically, I went into costume as the stalker, and I told my bodyguard, 'I don't want you to walk with me.' So, a friend of mine was there, and I was like, 'Let's walk together.'" After reports continued to speculate regarding the video's subject, Ratner explained that the main inspiration behind the video was the 1983 film, The King of Comedy. On July 10, 2009, Carey announced through her Twitter account that the video would premiere on the talent competition program, America's Got Talent, which was hosted by Cannon. The full version premiered two days later on 106 & Park. Carey was present at the show and discussed the making of the video.

=== Synopsis ===
Carey is shown as the stalker waiting for the "real Carey" across the street. The inclusion of the stalker, as well as his attire, led to media uproar regarding the song's subject.

The video begins with Carey at a photoshoot in a private room at the Plaza Hotel, speaking the line, "And I was like, why are you so obsessed with me?" Next, a Rolls-Royce Phantom is shown pulling up to the hotel, with Carey stepping out of the vehicle. As she gets out of the car, Carey dressed as a bellhop, assists her to the ramp where she is walking and greeting fans. The next scene finds Carey walking into the hotel, and waving to everyone, with the camera zooming to the bellhop's face to reveal him intently staring at her. As the first verse begins, Carey is shown at the photo-shoot in the hotel, with a cameo by Patrick Demarchelier as the photographer. The bellhop, now dressed in a gray hoodie and sweatpants, is shown holding a hair-blower at Carey, apparently assisting with the shoot. As the shoot continues, scenes of the bellhop are shown in his room, where he has dolls of Carey on the wall, as well as quilts with the cover of her 2005 album, The Emancipation of Mimi.

The video progresses as Carey, now on the streets of New York, is walking towards the hotel. As she begins to notice the bellhop, dressed in the sweats, pursuing her, she turns around in haste and begins jolting back to the hotel while holding several shopping bags. Additionally, scenes of the stalker's home are shown again, this time more elaborately, with his walls covered with portraits of the singer, as well as album covers and lights around a large photo of her. As the video comes to an end, she waits for her limousine to arrive at the hotel. However, before she gets inside, she notices the stalker attempting to take a picture of her. She then looks directly into his camera and gives a smile. The stalker moves to take the picture but is struck down by a bus. Carey gasps in shock after witnessing the incident. The remix video for the song features the same story-line and footage, only showing inter-cut scenes of Carey dressed in a white ensemble, while laying on a vintage wooden table. As Gucci Mane stands next to her in a white suit, he pours her champagne and hands her the glass.

=== Reception ===
At the time of the video's release, several critics took notice of the similarities in Eminem's attire and Carey's stalker. Nick Levine from Digital Spy wrote: "It isn't quite as ridiculous as we were hoping, and Mariah's insisting the male stalker she plays isn't meant to be a 'specific person', but there's still plenty to enjoy in the 'Obsessed' video. There is a lot of MC cleavage, a not entirely convincing fake beard and a neat Mean Girls reference towards the end." Newsday's Corris Little described it as "genius!" and continued, "Move over Eminem, I'm officially obsessed with Mariah Carey. Who isn't? She can sing, she's pretty and she has really fun music videos." A writer from the Evening Standard called the video "shocking", and felt that Carey's disguise was so convincing, she should assume the role more often if she wants to travel incognito. The New York Post's Jarett Wieselman described it as "human butterfly embrac[ing] her macho side", and concluded his review with "I'm guessing the video involves Mariah's butch bellhop becoming a little infatuated with the singer, or something. Basically it's another way to give her double the screentime – much like that Mariah-on-Mariah fight in 'Heartbreaker'!" New York Daily News writer Chris Baud joked about Eminem going one step further, writing: "It's great that Mariah seems to be having fun with this whole 'Miminem' thing, but we're afraid of the conflict going any further, because no one wants to see the next step: Eminem in drag." Jennifer Armstrong from Entertainment Weekly complimented Carey for "going after" Eminem, and concluded "I like Mariah with a sense of humor, and I love the idea of her turning the tables on the king of celebrity-mocking videos."

== Live performances ==
Carey performed "Obsessed" on several televised appearances since its release. On August 5, 2009, Carey performed the song live for the first time on the fourth season of the talent competition, America's Got Talent. Carey, appearing in jeans and a black top, was accompanied by several male dancers and three back-up singers. As she performed the song, the dancers hoisted her into the air several times, and carried her to several areas on the stage. During the performance, several white lights flashed, while monitors behind the dancers showed images of Carey and the video. Breanne Heldman from E! Entertainment Television criticized several aspects of the performance. She described the lighting as "anxiety inducing", and wrote, "That said, no one is doubting the singer's impressive set of pipes, but—frighteningly jarring lighting and quick edits aside—did she actually utilize them on 'America's Got Talent' last night?" Aside from questioning the singers live vocals, she also felt Carey seemed "robotic", and didn't show effort or interest in the performance. A reviewer from Idolator also was critical on the performance, asking if there was "anything good about [it]". He claimed Carey was lip-syncing, and described it as "lackadaisical", and wrote, "the backup dancers' moves would have probably received a big red 'X' from at least one of the judges."

In the United States, on October 2, 2009, Carey began promotion of the album on Today, in the form of a four piece outdoor concert. Wearing a "black leather trench coat and accessorized with a glittery microphone", Carey performed "Obsessed", "I Want to Know What Love Is", "H.A.T.E.U." and her 1991 single, "Make It Happen". The performance of "Obsessed" featured similar choreography as on America's Got Talent, in which Carey was carried around by her dancers several times. Carey performed "Obsessed" live on Lopez Tonight on December 16, 2009, alongside another song from the album, "It's A Wrap". At the Fashion Rocks ceremony in 2009, Carey performed "Touch My Body" and "Obsessed", as well as the remix to her 1995 song "Fantasy". During the short set list, Carey was accompanied by six men in black tie and suits, who hoisted her into the air in front of over 6,000 people during "Obsessed", and rigorous dance routines throughout "Touch My Body". Following the release of Memoirs of an Imperfect Angel, she held four concerts at the Pearl Concert Theater, where she included the song on the set-list. Similar to the performance at the Fashion Rocks ceremony, Carey was hoisted into the air several times by four to six male dancers, each of whom circled her with intricate dancing throughout the song. Carey featured similar choreography for the song during her Angels Advocate Tour (2009–10), where it was included throughout the entire span of the tour.

== In popular culture ==
In the summer of 2019, the song became a viral TikTok challenge "which prompted endless comments, memes and even a response from Carey herself." In 2024, Megan Thee Stallion referenced Carey and "Obsessed" on her song "Hiss".

== Track listings and formats ==
Digital download

1. "Obsessed"

Digital download – remix

1. "Obsessed" (Remix feat. Gucci Mane)

US enhanced CD single

1. "Obsessed"
2. "Obsessed" (Remix feat. Gucci Mane)
3. "Obsessed" (Video)

European CD single

1. "Obsessed"
2. "Obsessed" (Cahill Radio Edit)

US 12-inch vinyl

1. "Obsessed"
2. "Obsessed" (Remix feat. Gucci Mane)
3. "Obsessed"
4. "Obsessed" (Remix feat. Gucci Mane)

Obsessed (The Remixes)

1. "Obsessed" (Cahill Radio Mix)
2. "Obsessed" (Seamus Haji & Paul Emanuel Radio Edit)
3. "Obsessed" (Friscia And Lamboy Radio Mix)
4. "Obsessed" (Jump Smokers Radio Edit)
5. "Obsessed" (Cahill Club Mix)
6. "Obsessed" (Seamus Haji & Paul Emanuel Club Mix)
7. "Obsessed" (Friscia And Lamboy Club Mix)
8. "Obsessed" (Cahill Dub)
9. "Obsessed" (Seamus Haji & Paul Emanuel Dub)
10. "Obsessed" (Friscia And Lamboy Piano Dub)

Memoirs of an Imperfect Angel bonus disc

1. "Obsessed" (Cahill Radio Mix)
2. "Obsessed" (Seamus Haji & Paul Emanuel Radio Edit)
3. "Obsessed" (Jump Smokers Radio Edit)
4. "Obsessed" (Friscia And Lamboy Radio Mix)
5. "Obsessed" (Video)
6. "Obsessed" (Remix feat. Gucci Mane)

== Credits and personnel ==
Adapted from the Memoirs of an Imperfect Angel liner notes.

- Mariah Carey – songwriting, producer, vocals
- Terius Nash – songwriting, producer
- Christopher Stewart – songwriting, producer
- Victor Alexander – producer
- Brian Garter – recording
- Brian Thomas – recording
- Jaysen-Joshua Fowler – audio mixing
- Dave Pensado – audio mixing
- Bernie Grundman – mastering

== Charts ==
=== Weekly charts ===
Weekly chart performance
| Chart (2009) | Peak position |
|---|---|
| Australia (ARIA) | 13 |
| Australia Urban (ARIA) | 3 |
| Belgium (Ultratip Bubbling Under Flanders) | 14 |
| Belgium (Ultratop 50 Wallonia) | 20 |
| Canada Hot 100 (Billboard) | 15 |
| Canada CHR/Top 40 (Billboard) | 17 |
| Canada Hot AC (Billboard) | 45 |
| Czech Republic Airplay (ČNS IFPI) | 11 |
| European Hot 100 Singles (Billboard) | 28 |
| France (SNEP) | 8 |
| Global Dance Songs (Billboard) | 9 |
| Italy (FIMI) | 6 |
| Japan (Japan Hot 100) | 16 |
| Netherlands (Dutch Top 40 Tipparade) | 3 |
| Netherlands (Single Top 100) | 61 |
| New Zealand (Recorded Music NZ) | 21 |
| New Zealand Urban Radio (RadioScope) | 4 |
| Romania TV Airplay (Media Forest) | 20 |
| Slovakia Airplay (ČNS IFPI) | 37 |
| Switzerland (Schweizer Hitparade) | 61 |
| UK Singles (Official Charts) | 52 |
| UK Hip Hop/R&B (Official Charts) | 15 |
| UK Club (Music Week) | 7 |
| UK Pop Club (Music Week) | 2 |
| UK Urban Club (Music Week) | 10 |
| US Billboard Hot 100 | 7 |
| US Dance Club Songs (Billboard) | 1 |
| US Dance Airplay (Billboard) | 1 |
| US Hot R&B/Hip-Hop Songs (Billboard) | 12 |
| US Pop Airplay (Billboard) | 8 |
| US Rhythmic Airplay (Billboard) | 2 |

=== Monthly charts ===
Monthly chart performance
| Chart (2009) | Peak position |
|---|---|
| Brazil (Brasil Hot 100 Airplay) | 23 |
| Brazil (Brasil Hot Pop Songs) | 12 |

=== Year-end charts ===
Year-end chart performance
| Chart (2009) | Position |
|---|---|
| Australia Urban (ARIA) | 39 |
| Brazil (Crowley) | 58 |
| Canada (Canadian Hot 100) | 94 |
| France (SNEP) | 71 |
| Japan Adult Contemporary (Billboard) | 41 |
| Taiwan (Yearly Singles Top 100) | 62 |
| US Billboard Hot 100 | 41 |
| US Hot R&B/Hip-Hop Songs (Billboard) | 63 |
| US Rhythmic (Billboard) | 14 |

== Certifications ==
Certifications
| Region | Certification | Certified units/sales |
|---|---|---|
| Australia (ARIA) | Gold | 35,000^{^} |
| Brazil (Pro-Música Brasil) | 3× Platinum | 180,000^{‡} |
| Denmark (IFPI Danmark) | Gold | 45,000^{‡} |
| New Zealand (RMNZ) | 2× Platinum | 60,000^{‡} |
| United Kingdom (BPI) | Platinum | 600,000^{‡} |
| United States (RIAA) | 4× Platinum | 4,000,000^{‡} |
^{^} Shipments figures based on certification alone.^{‡} Sales+streaming figures based on certification alone.

== Release history ==
Release dates and formats
| Region | Date | Format |
|---|---|---|
| United States | June 16, 2009 | Radio premiere |
| United States | June 22, 2009 | Rhythmic radio |
| Worldwide | July 7, 2009 | Digital download |
| United States | July 21, 2009 | Digital download – Gucci Mane Remix |
| United States | July 27, 2009 | Mainstream radio |
| United States | August 11, 2009 | CD single |
| France | September 21, 2009 | CD single |

== See also ==
- List of Billboard Hot Dance Club Play number ones of 2009
- List of number-one dance airplay hits of 2009 (U.S.)
