= Angels Cry (song) =

2010 single by Mariah Carey featuring Ne-Yo

Song by Mariah Carey

from the album Memoirs of an Imperfect Angel
- Released: September 29, 2009
- Recorded: 2009
- Studio: Boom Boom Room (Burbank, California); Honeywest (NYC, New York); Soapbox Studios (Atlanta, Georgia)
- Genre: R&B
- Length: 4:02
- Label: Island Def Jam
- Songwriters: Mariah Carey; Tricky Stewart; James "Big Jim" Wright; Crystal Johnson
- Producers: Carey; Stewart; Wright

Music video
- "Angels Cry" on YouTube

"Angels Cry" is a song by American singer-songwriter Mariah Carey from her twelfth studio album, Memoirs of an Imperfect Angel (2009). It was written and produced by Carey, Tricky Stewart and James "Big Jim" Wright, with additional songwriting from Crystal Johnson. On the album's track listing, "Angels Cry" is preceded by a one-minute, four second prelude called "Angel (The Prelude)", which consists of Carey performing purely in her whistle register. The prelude then leads into "Angels Cry", a song about trying to fix a broken relationship because true love only happens once.

== Background and release ==
"Angels Cry" was written and produced by Mariah Carey, Tricky Stewart and James "Big Jim" Wright, with additional songwriting from Crystal Johnson, for Carey's twelfth studio album Memoirs of an Imperfect Angel (2009). "Angels Cry" is preceded by a one-minute, four second prelude called "Angel (The Prelude)". The prelude was written and produced by Carey, Stewart and Wright. The prelude consists of Carey performing only whistle notes. Carey revealed that she intended to re-release Memoirs of an Imperfect Angel as a remix album in early 2010, titled Angels Advocate, consisting of remixes of the standard songs with new featured artists, including Mary J. Blige, Snoop Dogg, Trey Songz, R. Kelly, T-Pain, Gucci Mane and OJ da Juiceman. "Angels Cry" and "Up Out My Face" from Memoirs of an Imperfect Angel were released as remix singles with Ne-Yo featuring on the former and Nicki Minaj on the latter.

The remix version of "Angels Cry" featuring Ne-Yo was released to rhythmic contemporary and urban contemporary radio in the United States on January 26, 2010. It was made available for digital download on February 23, 2010, in Canada and the United States. A release date of February 23, 2010, for the album was slated, and then pushed back to March 9. It was then further pushed back to March 30. However, it was confirmed in March 2010 that production of Angels Advocate had halted and the project was shelved indefinitely. Island Def Jam stated that the singer was instead working on a new project and "new surprises". Metro revealed that Carey was possibly recording a Christmas album.

== Composition and reception ==
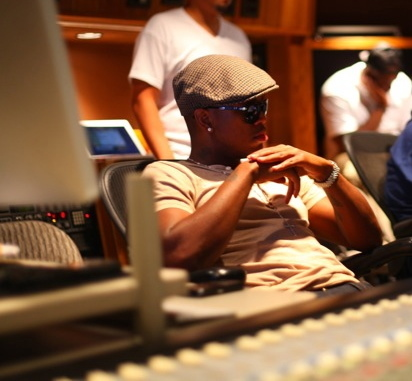
Ne-Yo was featured on the remix of "Angels Cry"

"Angels Cry" is an R&B song on which Carey uses her higher vocal register over an instrumental of a piano and hand clapping. Lyrically, the song is about maintaining hope that a fading relationship can be salvaged because true love only happens once. Carey sings "I’m willing to live and die for our love/Baby we can get back that shine." However, the lyrics "Super natural love conquers all" could also be interpreted as feeling God's love. Adam Holz of Plugged In (publication) thought that the lyrics were "depressing," while Lauren Murphy of Entertainment IE felt that the lyrics "When you and I say goodbye, I felt the angels cry" were too sentimental. Although Ann Powers of Los Angeles Times thought that the song had a "sad" tone, she praised its production.

Digital Spy's Robert Copsey praised the track. He wrote that it was one of the standouts on Memoirs of an Imperfect Angel and that "it's about as close to 'classic' Mariah as 'new' Mariah gets". He complimented Carey's "classy" and "effortless" vocals, and added that Ne-Yo gave the track an emotional "extra dimension". Copsey likened the song to one of Carey's previous singles, "We Belong Together" (2005): "It's a bit of a 'We Belong Together' retread, but it's a thoroughly pleasant 'We Belong Together' retread". A reviewer for DJ Booth commented that the song sounded as thought it could have been released in 1994. Bill Lamb of About.com placed "Angels Cry" in his list of the album's best tracks.

== Chart performance ==
In the United States, the remix peaked at number twenty-six on the Adult Contemporary chart, becoming her twenty-eighth career entry and Ne-Yo's first. It is the second song from Memoirs of an Imperfect Angel to enter the chart following Carey's single release cover of "I Want to Know What Love Is" which peaked at number ten; it is also the first time Carey had charted two songs on the Adult Contemporary chart from the same album since her sixth studio Butterfly, where its title track and "My All" peaked at numbers eleven and eighteen in 1997/98. The remix also peaked at number ninety on the Hot R&B/Hip-Hop Songs chart. Elsewhere, the track peaked at number eighty-nine in Japan and number ninety on the UK Singles Chart, but reached number twenty-eight on the UK R&B Chart. In South Korea, it peaked at number 72 on the main Digital Chart.

== Charts ==
=== Weekly charts ===
Solo version
| Chart (2010) | Peak position |
|---|---|
| South Korea International (Circle) | 77 |

Duet with Ne-Yo
| Chart (2010) | Peak position |
|---|---|
| Japan (Japan Hot 100) | 89 |
| South Korea (Circle) | 72 |
| UK Singles (Official Charts) | 81 |
| UK Hip Hop/R&B (Official Charts) | 28 |
| US Adult Contemporary (Billboard) | 26 |
| US Hot R&B/Hip-Hop Songs (Billboard) | 90 |

== Certifications and sales ==
Certifications and sales for "Angels Cry"
| Region | Certification | Certified units/sales |
|---|---|---|
| Brazil (Pro-Música Brasil) | Gold | 30,000^{‡} |
| South Korea Remix featuring Ne-Yo | — | 341,862 |
^{‡} Sales+streaming figures based on certification alone.

== Release history ==
| Country | Date | Format | Label |
|---|---|---|---|
| United States | January 26, 2010 | Rhythmic contemporary | Island Def Jam |
| United States | January 26, 2010 | Urban contemporary | Island Def Jam |
| Canada | February 23, 2010 | Digital download | Island Def Jam |
| United States | February 23, 2010 | Digital download | Island Def Jam |

== Ne-Yo remix ==
"Angels Cry"

Single by Mariah Carey featuring Ne-Yo
- Released: January 26, 2010
- Recorded: 2009
- Studio: Boom Boom Room (Burbank, California); Honeywest (NYC, New York); Soapbox Studios (Atlanta, Georgia)
- Genre: R&B
- Length: 3:54
- Label: Island Def Jam
- Songwriters: Mariah Carey; Tricky Stewart; James "Big Jim" Wright; Crystal Johnson
- Producers: Carey; Stewart; Wright

Mariah Carey singles chronology
| "Up Out My Face" (2010) | "Angels Cry" (2010) | "Oh Santa!" (2010) |

Ne-Yo singles chronology
| "Never Knew I Needed" (2009) | "Angels Cry" (2010) | "Super High" (2010) |

Music video
- "Angels Cry" on YouTube

Mariah Carey released "Angels Cry" as a remix single featuring Ne-Yo in January 2010 for a proposed Memoirs of an Imperfect Angel remix album called Angels Advocate, which was ultimately shelved.

=== Music video ===
The accompanying music video for the remix of "Angels Cry" was directed by Carey's then husband, Nick Cannon. In December 2009, Cannon spoke of the video's concept, saying "This video is going to be simplistically genius! No bells and whistles, just documenting history and brilliance. Two of the worlds [sic] greatest song writers in the studio crafting a masterpiece. I hope the world is ready to hear 'Angels Cry'". It premiered simultaneously with the video for "Up Out My Face" with Nicki Minaj on Vevo on January 28, 2010. The video shows Carey and Ne-Yo collaborating on the song together in a recording studio.

The video starts with Carey walking in the rain to meet Ne-Yo who is waiting for her in the studio. Clips of Carey singing in desperation in the rain are intercut with footage of her recording her vocals in the recording booth. For his scenes, Ne-Yo sings as he stands next to as well as plays the piano as Carey reminisces by herself, while other scenes show him in the booth with Carey as they sing their parts together. Ne-Yo’s ex-fiancée Monyetta Shaw can also be seen in the video, Carey is seen holding her fragrance and gives Shaw a sample on her neck which Ne-Yo proceeds to get a whiff of. At the video's climax, both singers are belt the final note in the booth, which is followed by them walking out of the studio where it has stopped raining and the sun is shining. Robbie Daw wrote that the video gave him "chills". He also commented on the use of product placement of Carey's perfume M and her own brand of champagne. Melinda Newman of HitFix thought that the video appeared to have a bigger production budget than that of the video for "Up Out My Face" with Minaj, but noted that it was still "low-key" for a Carey video. Newman further commented that while the singer appears to be wearing albeit little make-up, she looked more natural and "beautiful" than ever. Leonie Cooper thought that the video made the "bland" song more appealing: "the video, with a moist Mariah mithering in the rain, preposterous sequinned gold boots, a puppy in the studio, and shameless pimping of her latest perfume, kind of makes up for it."

=== Composition ===
Musically, the remix does not greatly differ from that of the original apart from a new second verse by Ne-Yo.

=== Critical reception ===
Leonie Cooper of The Guardian gave a mixed review of the remix. Although she did not express her dislike for the track, she felt that it was too similar to Carey previous material, writing that it is middle-of-the road "inoffensive semi-soul fodder we've had to come to expect from her." Cooper was, however, critical of the decision to include Ne-Yo and that his addition makes the song even more bland. Robbie Daw of Idolator also felt that the track was a "typically Mariah-esque ballad". Michael Cragg of musicOMH was critical of the song, writing that it is a "limp ballad" which he thought was trying too hard at recreating some of Carey's previous material, and concluded by writing that it "ultimately ends up making you want to hear the original version more than anything".
