= Angels Advocate Tour =

2009–10 concert tour by Mariah Carey

- Continental tour by Mariah Carey
- Promotional poster for the tour
- Location: North America
- Associated album: Memoirs of an Imperfect Angel
- Start date: December 31, 2009
- End date: February 27, 2010
- Legs: 4
- No. of shows: 23
- Box office: $9.1 million (North American Leg)

Mariah Carey concert chronology
- The Adventures of Mimi (2006); Angels Advocate Tour (2009–2010); Australian Tour 2013 (2013)

The Angels Advocate Tour was the seventh concert tour by American singer-songwriter Mariah Carey. The tour supported her twelfth studio album, Memoirs of an Imperfect Angel (2009). The tour played 23 shows, visiting the United States and Canada. It began December 31, 2009 in New York City, New York and concluded on February 27, 2010 in Las Vegas. The tour grossed $9.1 million, selling 88,930 tickets.

== Background ==
After performing a set of promotional shows at The Pearl Concert Theater, rumors circulated in the media of Carey's forthcoming arena tour. In December 2009, the tour was official announced by Carey's official website and Twitter page, under the title "Angels' Advocate Tour". The name is linked to a song from her recent album Memoirs of an Imperfect Angel, "Angels Cry" which has since been remixed to feature Ne-Yo and released while Carey was on tour. This was her first concert tour since her The Adventures of Mimi Tour in 2006. Dates were only slated for the U.S. and Canada.

== Critical reception ==
The tour’s reviews were generally positive, with most critics admiring Carey's live vocals. A review from The Palm Beach Post described Carey's vocals as being "strong, assured and, as usual, eerily effortless" a sentiment that was additionally reflected in Chris Azzopardi's review of the Detroit date for Pride Source that commented; "You attend a Mariah Carey concert to be in the dreamlike presence of a super-diva, not expecting to be wooed by artful razzle-dazzle or the singer's dexterous dance moves. Those aerobics are in her voice, a supreme many-octave instrument that worked for 95 minutes during her "Angels Advocate Tour" Monday at the Fox Theatre in Detroit." Lauren Carter of the Boston Herald also praised Carey's vocals, stating that "'My All,' the gospel-inspired 'Fly Like a Bird' and early career hit 'Emotions' were all powerhouse stunners, boasting the mix of smoky tones, soulful trills and high-octave whistles that have become her trademark." Critics praised Carey's ability to vocally deliver despite experiencing a cold on several dates with Jason Richards of Toronto Now's article aptly titled 'Mariah fights through cold for ACC performance' commenting that "Mariah Carey's cold was a running theme at the singer's Air Canada Centre show", before going on to say "It's a testament to her vocal talent, then, that Mariah still managed to flex her legendary five-octave range throughout the night."

The set design and choice of songs in the set list were also praised, in particular, the mix of "Love Hangover"/"Heartbreaker", and her performances of "We Belong Together" and "Hero". Carey's conversational banter with the crowd was also been the subject of much praise, with an MTV review commenting, "Throughout the night, her between-song banter felt light, honest and steadfastly lucid, in stark contrast to recent well-publicized bouts of public babbling. Her intimate connection with her fans was palpable from start to finish." A review from the Los Angeles Times stated "her transparent blend of vocal talent and goofy charisma seems appealingly old-fashioned." Sarah Rodman from The Boston Globe commented that the show was "precisely that mix of diva and daffiness that endears Carey to her fans and that worked to make the hour-and-40-minute show a captivating mix of sparkle, silliness, and vocal pyrotechnics."

=== Controversy ===
Carey displayed notable tardiness throughout the tour. She arrived on stage 40 minutes late in Ottawa, 60 minutes in Montreal, Toronto, and Grand Prairie, and 95 minutes late in Mashantucket, which resulted in “boos” from the crowd. Carey acknowledged her propensity for lateness during the first Los Angeles show (which began on-schedule), asking the crowd to confirm, "I'm usually much more late and people criticize me for that ... But tonight, in Los Angeles, was I on time?"

== Set list ==
The following set list is from the February 13, 2010, concert in Chicago. It is not intended to represent all dates throughout the tour.

1. "Butterfly" Intro / "Daydream Interlude (Fantasy Sweet Dub Mix)"
2. "Shake It Off"
3. "Touch My Body"
4. "Fly Like a Bird"
5. "Make It Happen"
6. "Angels Cry"
7. "Always Be My Baby"
8. "It's Like That"
9. "The Impossible"
10. "Love Hangover" / "Heartbreaker"
11. "Honey"
12. "My All"
13. "Emotions"
14. "Obsessed"
15. "We Belong Together"
16. "Hero" (Encore)

== Shows ==
List of concerts, showing date, city, country, venue, opening act, tickets sold, number of available tickets and amount of gross revenue
Date	City	Country	Venue	Opening act	Attendance / Tickets	Revenue (US$)
December 31, 2009	New York City	United States	Madison Square Garden	Trey Songz	11,534 / 11,831	$1,224,734
January 2, 2010	Atlantic City	United States	Borgata Events Center	RydazNrtisT	—N/a	—N/a
January 15, 2010	Mashantucket	United States	MGM Grand Theater	RydazNrtisT	—N/a	—N/a
January 16, 2010	Mashantucket	United States	MGM Grand Theater	RydazNrtisT	—N/a	—N/a
January 19, 2010	Atlanta	United States	Fox Theatre	RydazNrtisT	2,833 / 3,719	$305,940
January 21, 2010	Hollywood	United States	Hard Rock Live	RydazNrtisT	5,770 / 5,770	$527,640
January 25, 2010	Detroit	United States	Fox Theatre	RydazNrtisT	3,828 / 4,842	$284,642
January 27, 2010	Washington, D.C.	United States	DAR Constitution Hall	RydazNrtisT	2,430 / 3,166	$216,247
January 30, 2010	Boston	United States	Wang Theatre	RydazNrtisT	—N/a	—N/a
February 1, 2010	Upper Darby Township	United States	Tower Theater	RydazNrtisT	2,466 / 3,116	$216,675
February 4, 2010	Montreal	Canada	Bell Centre	RydazNrtisT	3,806 / 4,750	$400,275
February 6, 2010	Ottawa	Canada	Scotiabank Place	RydazNrtisT	2,443 / 3,100	$210,220
February 9, 2010	Toronto	Canada	Air Canada Centre	RydazNrtisT	6,250 / 8,000	$658,074
February 10, 2010	Columbus	United States	Value City Arena	RydazNrtisT	—N/a	—N/a
February 13, 2010	Chicago	United States	Chicago Theatre	RydazNrtisT	7,034 / 7,034	$726,591
February 14, 2010	Chicago	United States	Chicago Theatre	RydazNrtisT	7,034 / 7,034	$726,591
February 17, 2010	Houston	United States	Verizon Wireless Theater	RydazNrtisT	2,505 / 2,627	$247,668
February 18, 2010	Grand Prairie	United States	Nokia Live at Grand Prairie	RydazNrtisT	5,357 / 6,301	$347,544
February 20, 2010	Phoenix	United States	Dodge Theatre	RydazNrtisT	4,860 / 4,860	$319,355
February 23, 2010	Los Angeles	United States	Gibson Amphitheatre	RydazNrtisT	10,741 / 11,882	$1,107,515
February 24, 2010	Los Angeles	United States	Gibson Amphitheatre	RydazNrtisT	10,741 / 11,882	$1,107,515
February 26, 2010	Oakland	United States	Oracle Arena	RydazNrtisT	7,532 / 7,788	$702,953
February 27, 2010	Las Vegas	United States	The Colosseum at Caesars Palace	RydazNrtisT	4,053 / 4,053	$552,188

== Cancelled shows ==
List of cancelled concerts, showing date, city, country, venue and reason for cancellation
Date	City	Country	Venue	Reason
February 16, 2010	Minneapolis	United States	Northrop Auditorium	Unknown

== Personnel ==
- Eric Daniels – musical director, keyboards
- Peter Dyer – keyboards
- Lance Tolbert - bass
- Bennie Rodgers – drums
- Trey Lorenz – background vocals
- Mary Ann Tatum – background vocals
- Sherry Tatum - background vocals
- Takeytha Johnson – background vocals
