= My All =

1998 single by Mariah Carey

- Single artwork, omitting "Breakdown" on the front cover

Single by Mariah Carey

from the album Butterfly
- B-side: "Breakdown"
- Released: April 21, 1998
- Recorded: November 22–24, 1996; December 9, 1996; January 17, 1997
- Studio: Crave, The Hit Factory (New York City); WallyWorld (California, US)
- Genre: R&B; Latin
- Length: 3:51
- Label: Columbia
- Composers: Mariah Carey; Walter Afanasieff
- Lyricist: Mariah Carey
- Producers: Mariah Carey; Walter Afanasieff

Mariah Carey singles chronology
"The Roof (Back in Time)" (1998)	"My All" (1998)	"Sweetheart" (1998)

Music videos
- "My All" on YouTube; "My All/Stay Awhile" (So So Def remix) on YouTube

"My All" is a song by American singer-songwriter Mariah Carey from her sixth studio album, Butterfly (1997). It was released as the album's fifth and final single overall and second commercial single on April 21, 1998, by Columbia Records. The song was written and produced by Carey and Walter Afanasieff. "My All" is built around Latin guitar chord melodies, and makes subtle use of Latin percussion throughout the first chorus, before taking on a more conventional R&B-style beat. Carey was inspired to write the song and use Latin inspired melodies after a trip to Puerto Rico, where she was influenced by the culture. The song's lyrics tell of a lonely woman declaring she would give "her all" to have just one more night with her estranged lover. It is the first song Carey wrote for the Butterfly album.

The music video for the song was released in March 1998. It shows many scenes of Carey laying on a submerged vessel in a large body of water, while lamenting her lost lover. Towards the video's climax, Carey and her love interest climb atop a lighthouse and caress each other under the night's sky. "My All" was performed live on various occasions, including the 1998 World Music Awards and Blockbuster Entertainment Awards, Saturday Night Live, The Rosie O'Donnell Show and various European television and music chart programs. The song was also part of Carey's 1998 Butterfly World Tour, and was performed during many future tours and concerts. House music producer David Morales remixed the song, which was performed live as a medley with the original.

"My All" received acclaim from music critics and charted strongly throughout various music markets. In the United States, the song became Carey's thirteenth chart topper on the Billboard Hot 100, and was certified double-platinum by the Recording Industry Association of America (RIAA). Throughout Europe, the song performed moderately, peaking at number four in the United Kingdom and in the top ten in Belgium (Wallonia), France, Spain and Switzerland. In France, due to strong sales, the song was certified gold by the Syndicat National de l'Édition Phonographique (SNEP).

== Background ==
After the release of Daydream (1995), her fifth studio album on Columbia Records, American singer Mariah Carey entered couples therapy with her husband, Columbia executive Tommy Mottola. Carey was encouraged to have more independence after feeling personally and professionally stifled by Mottola, whom she feared due to his controlling nature and numerous associates in the entertainment industry. At a dinner party without Mottola, she met New York Yankees baseball player Derek Jeter and became romantic with him soon after. Due in part to Jeter's influence, Carey moved out of her New York mansion with Mottola in December 1996.

At a subsequent therapy session, Carey said she needed to visit Puerto Rico to relax and write. In reality, she had heard Jeter would be there and sought to continue their secret romance. After meeting Jeter at a club in San Juan, the couple spent the night at a villa. Carey immediately became enamored with him to the point where "desire became my reason for living, my all". She conceptualized the song "My All" on an airplane back to New York.

== Recording ==
Carey, who had begun working on her new album Butterfly (1997) before meeting Jeter, wrote "My All" with her longtime collaborator Walter Afanasieff at her mansion's Crave recording studio. While working with a new Korg Trinity synthesizer, he came across an effect for steel-string acoustic guitar that resembled the sound of a Spanish guitar. After playing different chord changes, Afanasieff settled on "an old-fashioned sort of Russian, Latin-Spanish chord progression melody" which was influenced by his exposure to that music as a child and by Carey's time in Puerto Rico.

Due to her belief that the song "was about life and death", Carey insisted that "My All" have a "strong and simple" composition that made her vocals prominent in the mix while avoiding overpowering music. This formed a broader pattern of taking more creative control with the creation of Butterfly, as she also began working with hip-hop producers Sean Combs and Stevie J on other songs. According to Afanasieff, Carey "felt that shutting her relationship with [Mottola] was also a cleansing of who she was. She felt that part of what she was dropping was the schmaltzy pop singer ballad stuff he was kind of adamant about". "My All" would ultimately become one of Carey's last collaborations with Afanasieff.

Carey recorded "My All" at Afanasieff's WallyWorld studio in San Francisco, and additional work occurred at Crave and The Hit Factory in New York City. Dana Jon Chappelle and Mike Scott engineered the song with assistance from Ian Dalsemer. Afanasieff played the keyboards and added synthesizers and programming to the composition, while Dan Shea contributed additional keyboards, drum and rhythm programming, and the sound design and computer programming. After Mick Guzauski mixed "My All" at Crave, Bob Ludwig conducted the mastering at Gateway in Portland, Maine. Though she believed "there would be hell to pay" because Mottola would think she was having sex with another man, Carey believed the song "was the realest, boldest, most passionate love song" of her career. Upon playing "My All" to Mottola for the first time, she felt "he knew it could never be about him".

== Composition ==
"My All"
A sample from the song's first bridge, featuring guitar arpeggios and drum beats. It also incorporates an intricate melodic phrasing.

"My All" is a slow-tempo ballad, that blends contemporary R&B beats and Latin guitar and chord melodies, making subtle use of Latin percussion in the first chorus. The song is described as having a "lush sound" and featured synthetic guitar arpeggios that were produced in the studio. "My All" was compared to Toni Braxton's music style, described as "slink, slow-jam R&B sounds." The song is set in signature common time and written in the key of G minor. It features a basic chord progression of Gm-Cm-D7-Gm. Carey's vocal range in the song spans from the low note of B_{2} to the high note of F_{5}, with the piano and guitar pieces range from G♭3 to G♭5. The track was very different than anything Carey had ever recorded, incorporating strong "Latin cultured background." The instrumentation and vocal arrangement used in the song was compared to Kenneth "Babyface" Edmonds' productions, due to its "soft R&B coos and guitar melodies."

== Critical reception ==
Professional ratings
Review scores
Source	Rating
AllMusic	2.5/5 stars
Entertainment Weekly	B+
Stereogum	6/10

"My All" received acclaim from music critics. Stephen Thomas Erlewine from AllMusic chose the song as one of the three "track choices" from the album. Daryl Easlea for BBC said it "encapsulates her more traditional, straight ballad approach with Latin overtones." Larry Flick from Billboard praised the song, calling it an "anthemic gem." He also described it as "sparkling with a house flavor that's mildly reminiscent of Toni Braxton's landmark 'Un-break My Heart'." While reviewing the album, Flick also reviewed the Morales remix, writing "Morales straddles the fence between underground aggression and pop-radio fluff with deceptive ease, crafting a track anchored with a muscular bassline and embellished with vibrant synths. It's 10 minutes of pure disco bliss." David Browne from Entertainment Weekly praised the song's instrumentation, noting "with its gently plucked guitars, is the best Babyface track Babyface never produced." Another editor, Mark Bautz, felt it stand up as one of "the best pop tunes of the '90s." In 2018, the magazine described it as a "let-the-candles-burn" ballad "put through a slow-burn flamenco filter and zhuzhed up with some serious sensuality and Spanish guitar." A reviewer from The Hartford Courant wrote that Carey's voice "flows like molasses, accompanied by a lead guitar in the sexy "My All"." Virginian Pilot described the song as Carey's trademark "lush pop ballad" that has been "tailor-made" for movie themes. Richard Harrington from The Washington Post felt it's "another yearning ballad with Babyface-style romantic extremism". At the 2nd Record Awards, "My All" won the award for Foreign Radio Hit of the Year.

== Chart performance ==
Although "My All" was the fifth single released from Butterfly, it was only the second commercial worldwide release. "My All" experienced commercial success in the United States. After being "deeply discounted" at retail outlets, the song debuted at number two on the Billboard Hot 100 chart behind Next's "Too Close" with sales of 122,000 units and 21 million radio airplay audience impressions. Two weeks later, the song became Carey's fifth in a row to top the chart and her thirteenth overall. She tied Michael Jackson as the artist with the third-most number one songs. "My All" also gave Afanasieff his third number one as a writer and sixth as producer. It spent one week atop the chart and, as of 2018, is Carey's fourteenth-best performing entry.

It was certified double-platinum by the Recording Industry Association of America (RIAA), denoting shipments of over two million units. "My All" peaked at number four on the Billboard Hot R&B/Hip-Hop Songs, and eighteen on the Adult Contemporary chart. It finished number seventeen on the Billboard end of year chart, and ninety-nine on the end of decade chart. In Canada, the song entered the Canadian RPM Chart at number 89 during the week of May 18, 1998. In its fifth week, the song peaked at number 28, spending 16 weeks in the chart before exiting the week of August 31.

"My All" performed weakly in Australia, peaking at number 39 while spending only two weeks on the ARIA Top-40. In Belgium (Wallonia), it peaked at number nine, and spent 14 weeks on the Ultratop singles chart. The song performed well in France, peaking at number six and spending 24 weeks fluctuating in the French singles chart. "My All" was certified silver by the Syndicat National de l'Édition Phonographique (SNEP), denoting shipments of 125,000 units throughout France. The song performed moderately in Ireland, peaking at number 21, and spending seven weeks on the Irish Singles Chart. In Norway and Sweden, it peaked at numbers 14 and 15, respectively. The song charted well in Switzerland, spending 21 weeks in the top-100, and peaking at number seven. In the United Kingdom, "My All" debuted and peaked at number four on the UK Singles Chart on June 13, 1998, the highest new entry of the week. The song spent eight weeks on the singles chart, until the week of August 1, 1998, where it dropped outside the top-100. Sales in the UK are estimated at 160,000 units.

== Remixes and other versions ==
"My All" features two remixes: the first is a contemporary R&B version titled, "My All/Stay Awhile" (So So Def Remix). Carey re-recorded her vocals for the song, while building it around a sample from the Loose Ends song "Stay a Little While, Child." Carey's vocal interpolation blends the first verse and chorus of "My All" with the verse and chorus of "Stay a Little While, Child." It was produced by Jermaine Dupri and features raps from Lord Tariq and Peter Gunz. The single also features a version without any rap verses. The second remix is a dance version mixed by David Morales. The dance remix is known as the Classic Club Mix; it was Carey's first collaboration with Morales that did not feature entirely new vocals. Consequently, the song is fairly close to the original chord progressions of the album version, though some new vocals were added. The remix was performed live as a medley with the original during many of Carey's live concert tours.

Carey recorded a Spanish version of "My All" titled, "Mi Todo." Unlike with "Hero" (1993) and "Open Arms" (1995), Carey recorded the Spanish version of the song in a different key from the original English version. The first line of the song had been mistranslated and was grammatically incorrect. Carey later mentioned on her website that she would no longer record Spanish versions of her songs until she could verify the correct lyrics and pronunciation. "Mi Todo" was remixed as well, however only being released as a promotional single in Mexico.

== Music videos ==
"My All" and the "My All/Stay Awhile" (So So Def Remix) featured different music videos. The video for "My All" was shot entirely in black and white in Puerto Rico, and was directed by fashion photographer Herb Ritts. The video begins with Carey lying on an overturned vessel on a beach, staring into the night sky, lamenting her estranged lover. As the scenes progress, Carey's love interest is seen atop a lighthouse in the middle of the ocean, searching for his lost companion. Further scenes show Carey laying on a large conch shell, wet and vulnerable. Soon after, she begins walking on a path of large white flowers, until she reaches the top of the lighthouse where she is rejoined with her lover. After the song's second verse, Carey and the man begin caressing each other, and embracing atop the lighthouse. After they share an intimate moment, Carey is shown walking back on the trail of white flowers, smiling and happy. The scenes of Carey lying in the shell and in front of the flowers were inspired by Sandro Botticelli's painting The Birth of Venus. According to author Chris Nickson, the snippets of Carey on the overturned vessel showed her vulnerability without her loved one, truly highlighting the yearning emphasized in the song. Sony Music Video released "My All" on VHS on April 21, 1998; it peaked at number six on the US Billboard Music Video Sales chart and sold 6,000 copies by June of that year according to Nielsen SoundScan.

A music video was also filmed for the So So Def remix. Directed by Diane Martel, it was shot in a grainy fashion to simulate a home video. The video features cameo appearances by Dupri, Tariq and Gunz. It begins with scenes of Carey and Dupri at a small in-home gathering, lounging and enjoying each other's company. As the video progresses, the other two featured hip-hop musicians appear at the house, alongside various other guests. They begin to dance to music, while sipping on cocktails by the pool. As the video reaches its climax, scenes of Carey singing in an outdoor garden are shown, while the others join her on the pool deck.

== Live performances ==
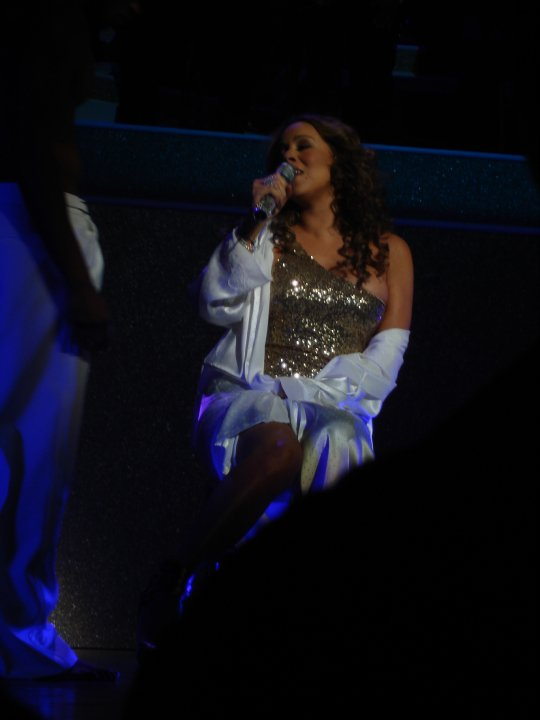
Carey performing "My All" during a concert in Las Vegas

"My All" was performed on several live television appearances, as well as most of Carey's tours following the song's release. Carey first sang "My All" on Saturday Night Live on November 15, 1997. Later, Carey performed the song at the 1998 World Music Awards, completing both the original and dance remix as a medley. The performance was via-satellite from Carey's tour at the time, which was broadcast onto a large screen. At the Blockbuster Entertainment Awards in 1998, Carey sang the original version of the song, featuring a full orchestra and live backup vocals.

Carey was one of the five featured performers at the 1998 VH1 Divas, where she sang "My All" as well as the dance remix. The song was performed on the British music chart program, Top of the Pops, where a live medley of the original and dance versions were performed. Carey also sang it on Des O'Connor Tonight. "My All" was performed during Carey's Butterfly World Tour in 1998. For the performances in Japan, Carey featured a Latin guitarist and backing vocals. The guitarist was present during the song's recital throughout the entire tour, replacing the orchestra used during her television appearances. For the shows, Carey wore a beige outfit, with varying hairstyles. Neither remix version was performed during the tour.

Carey sang "My All" as the second song at concerts during the Rainbow World Tour (2000). According to The Sun critic Michael Faucher, it was one of a few occasions during the show in which Carey focused on her vocal delivery. Carey performed the original version of the song, once again featuring the orchestra and live female background vocals. 2 years later on December 7, 2002, Carey performed the original version of "My All" in front of a crowd of 50,000 people, at the closing ceremony concert of the Mexican Teletón, which took place in the country's Azteca Stadium. Since the Charmbracelet World Tour in 2004, Carey has not performed the full version of the original, substituting it for the dance remix after the second verse. During the shows in the Adventures of Mimi tour, Carey donned a black bikini and matching cape, while featuring one male and two female background singers. On the Angels Advocate Tour (2010), she performed the original and dance remix versions, wearing a red outfit while performing the song seated. Again, the original and dance remix was performed as a medley, featuring the same backup from the previous tour. After completing the song, Carey was whisked away by a shirtless male dancer, and carried off the stage for a costume change, as the back-up continued into the dance version.

== Cover versions ==
On February 25, 2014, Alisa Kozhikina, the representative of Russia to the Junior Eurovision Song Contest 2014, won in the Grand Finals of Golos Deti, the Russian kids' edition of The Voice, performing a Russian version of the song called "Vsyo". In 2020, Australian singer Greg Gould recorded a Spanglish version as a duet with Emily Williams for his album 1998.

Carey is credited as a songwriter on Astrid Sonne's 2024 song "Give my all," which interpolates the lyrics of the earlier Carey track.

== Formats and track listings ==
- US CD single
1. "My All" – 3:51
2. "Breakdown" – 4:58
- US CD maxi single
1. "My All" (Album Version) – 3:51
2. "My All" (Classic Club Mix) – 9:06
3. "Breakdown" (The Mo Thugs Remix) – 4:58
4. "The Roof" (Remix With Mobb Deep) – 5:29
5. "Fly Away" (Fly Away Club Mix) – 9:50
- US CD and 12-inch maxi single
1. "My All/Stay Awhile" (So So Def Mix With Lord Tariq & Peter Gunz) – 4:33
2. "My All/Stay Awhile" (So So Def Mix Without Rap) – 3:46
3. "My All" (Morales My Club Mix) – 7:08
4. "My All" (Morales Def Club Mix) – 7:16
5. "The Roof" (Morales Funky Club Mix) – 8:28
- My All MC30 EP
1. "My All / Stay Awhile" (So So Def Remix) – 4:45
2. "My All / Stay Awhile" (So So Def Remix without Rap) – 3:34
3. "My All" (Full Crew Radio Mix) – 3:59
4. "My All" (Classic Radio Club Mix) – 4:17
5. "My All" (Morales "My" Club Mix) – 7:11
6. "My All" (Morales "Def" Club Mix) – 7:17
7. "My All" (Morales Classic Club Mix) – 9:15
8. "My All" (VH1 Divas Live) – 5:28
- Mariah en Español MC30 EP
1. "Héroe" – 4:17
2. "El Amor Que Soñé" – 3:29
3. "Mi Todo" – 3:51
4. "Mi Todo" (Versión Por Una Noche Más) – 3:25
5. "Mi Todo" (Versión Mi Fiesta) – 4:30
6. "Mi Todo" (Por Una Noche Más En Los Clubs) – 7:04
7. "Mi Todo" (Por Una Noche Más Instrumental) – 3:24
- European 2-track CD single
1. "My All" (Album Version) – 3:51
2. "My All" (Classic Radio Club Mix) – 4:15
- European CD maxi-single
1. "My All" (Album Version) – 3:51
2. "My All" (Morales Classic Radio Mix) – 4:21
3. "My All" (Morales Classic Club Mix) – 9:06
4. "The Roof" (Mobb Deep Edit) featuring Mobb Deep - 4:23
- My All / Stay Awhile European CD maxi-single
1. "My All / Stay Awhile" (So So Def Remix) featuring Lord Tariq & Peter Gunz – 4:43
2. "My All / Stay Awhile" (So So Def Remix Without Rap) – 3:49
3. "My All" (Morales "Def" Club Mix) – 7:16
4. "My All" (Full Crew Main Mix) - 4:38
- My All / The Roof European CD maxi-single
1. "My All" (Album Version) – 3:51
2. "The Roof" (Album Version) - 5:14
3. "My All" (Classic Radio Club Mix) – 4:15
- US 12-inch single
1. "My All" (Classic Club Mix) – 9:06
2. "The Roof" (Mobb Deep Mix) – 5:29
3. "Breakdown" (The Mo'Thugs Remix) – 4:58
4. "Fly Away" (Butterfly Reprise) (Fly Away Club Mix) – 9:50
- European 12-inch single
1. "My All" (Classic Club Mix) – 9:06
2. "My All" (My Club Mix) – 7:08
3. "My All" (Album Version) – 3:51
4. "My All" (Classic Radio Club Mix) – 4:15

== Credits and personnel ==
Credits and personnel are adapted from the Butterfly liner notes.

Recording

- Recorded at Crave Studios (New York City), WallyWorld (California) and The Hit Factory (New York City)
- Mixed at Crave Studios (New York City)
- Mastered at Gateway Mastering (Portland, Maine)

Management

- Published by Sony/ATV Songs LLC, Rye Songs (BMI)/Sony/ATV Tunes LLC and WallyWorld Music
- All rights administered by Sony/ATV Music Publishing

Personnel

- Mariah Carey – lyricist, vocals, songwriting, production, arrangement
- Walter Afanasieff – songwriting, production, arrangement, keyboards, synthesizers, programming
- Dan Shea – additional keyboards, drum, rhythm programming, sound design, computer programming
- Dana Jon Chappelle – engineer
- Lyndell Fraser – audio engineer
- Ian Dalsemer – assistant engineer
- Mick Guzauski – mixing
- Bob Ludwig – mastering

== Charts ==
=== Weekly charts ===
Weekly chart performance
Chart (1998)	Peak position
Australia (ARIA)	39
Austria (Ö3 Austria Top 40)	31
Belgium (Ultratop 50 Flanders)	38
Belgium (Ultratop 50 Wallonia)	9
Canada Singles (SoundScan)	12
Canada Top Singles (RPM)	28
Canada Adult Contemporary (RPM)	14
Canada Contemporary Hit Radio (BDS)	31
Croatia (HRT)	5
Europe (European Hot 100 Singles)	9
Europe Radio (Music & Media)	16
France (SNEP)	6
France Airplay (SNEP)	9
Germany (GfK)	30
Ireland (IRMA)	21
Netherlands (Dutch Top 40)	32
Netherlands (Single Top 100)	32
New Zealand (Recorded Music NZ)	21
Norway (VG-lista)	15
Quebec (ADISQ)	47
Scottish Singles Sales (Official Charts)	12
Spain (AFYVE)	9
Spain Airplay (Music & Media)	3
Sweden (Sverigetopplistan)	14
Switzerland (Schweizer Hitparade)	7
UK Singles (Official Charts)	4
UK Hip Hop/R&B (Official Charts)	2
UK Club (Music Week) David Morales mixes	1
UK Pop Club (Music Week)	23
UK Urban Club (Music Week)	1
UK Airplay (Music Control)	30
UK Dance Airplay (Music Control)	15
US Billboard Hot 100	1
US Adult Contemporary (Billboard)	18
US Crossover (Billboard)	16
US Dance Club Songs (Billboard)	5
US Dance Singles Sales (Billboard) with "Fly Away (Butterfly Reprise)"	1
US Hot R&B/Hip-Hop Songs (Billboard) with "Breakdown"	4
US Pop Airplay (Billboard)	18
US Rhythmic Airplay (Billboard)	8
US Adult Contemporary (Gavin Report)	5
US Hot AC (Gavin Report)	26
US Top 40 (Gavin Report)	12
US Adult Contemporary (Radio & Records)	12
US CHR/Pop (Radio & Records)	15
US CHR/Rhythmic (Radio & Records)	7
US NAC/Smooth Jazz (Radio & Records)	29
US Urban (Radio & Records)	13
US Urban AC (Radio & Records)	12

=== Year-end charts ===
1998 year-end chart performance
Chart (1998)	Position
Belgium (Ultratop 50 Wallonia)	59
Canada Singles (SoundScan)	42
Canada Adult Contemporary (RPM)	82
Europe (European Hot 100 Singles)	76
France (SNEP)	35
Sweden (Hitlistan)	78
Switzerland (Schweizer Hitparade)	41
UK Singles (OCC)	130
UK Urban Club (Music Week)	9
US Billboard Hot 100	17
US Hot R&B Singles (Billboard) with "Breakdown"	24
US Mainstream Top 40 (Billboard)	71
US Maxi-Singles Sales (Billboard) with "Fly Away (Butterfly Reprise)"	2
US Rhythmic Top 40 (Billboard)	39
US Adult Contemporary (Radio & Records)	47
US CHR/Pop (Radio & Records)	67
US CHR/Rhythmic (Radio & Records)	39
US NAC/Smooth Jazz (Radio & Records)	74
US Urban (Radio & Records)	75
US Urban AC (Radio & Records)	44

1999 year-end chart performance
Chart (1999)	Position
US Maxi-Singles Sales (Billboard) with "Fly Away (Butterfly Reprise)"	28

=== Decade-end charts ===
Decade-end chart performance
Chart (1990–1999)	Position
US Billboard Hot 100	99

== Certifications ==
Certifications and sales
Region	Certification	Certified units/sales
Australia (ARIA)	Gold	35,000^{‡}
France (SNEP)	Gold	250,000^{*}
New Zealand (RMNZ)	Gold	15,000^{‡}
United Kingdom (BPI)	Gold	400,000^{‡}
United States (RIAA)	2× Platinum	2,000,000^{‡}
^{*} Sales figures based on certification alone.^{‡} Sales+streaming figures based on certification alone.

== Release history ==
Release dates and formats
Region	Date	Format(s)	Version	Label(s)	Ref.
United States	March 24, 1998	Contemporary hit radio; rhythmic contemporary radio	Original	Columbia	
United States	April 6, 1998	Urban contemporary radio	Original	Columbia	
Canada	April 14, 1998	CD maxi single	Original, double A-side with "Breakdown"	Columbia	
United States	April 21, 1998	7-inch vinyl single; 12-inch vinyl single; cassette single; cassette maxi single; CD single; CD maxi single	Original, double A-side with "Breakdown"	Columbia	
Japan	May 30, 1998	Mini CD single	Original	Sony Music Japan	
United States	June 9, 1998	CD maxi single; 12-inch vinyl single	"My All/Stay Awhile"	Columbia	
United Kingdom	June 15, 1998	12-inch vinyl	Original	Columbia	
Canada	June 22, 1998	CD maxi single	"My All/Stay Awhile"	Columbia	
Belgium	August 3, 1998	CD maxi single	Original	Columbia	
Various	August 28, 2020	Digital download; streaming	MC30 "My All" EP	Columbia; Legacy	
Various	September 4, 2020	Digital download; streaming	MC30 Mariah en Español EP	Columbia; Legacy	

== See also ==
- List of Billboard Hot 100 number-one singles of 1998
