= Against All Odds (Take a Look at Me Now) (Mariah Carey recording) =

2000 single by Mariah Carey

Single by Mariah Carey

from the album Rainbow
- B-side: "Crybaby"
- Released: May 29, 2000
- Recorded: 1999
- Studio: Capri Digital (Capri); Flyte Tyme (Edina)
- Genre: Pop; R&B
- Length: 3:25
- Label: Columbia
- Songwriter: Phil Collins
- Producers: Mariah Carey; Jimmy Jam and Terry Lewis

Mariah Carey singles chronology
"Crybaby" (2000)	"Against All Odds (Take a Look at Me Now)" (2000)	"Against All Odds" (featuring Westlife) (2000)

Music video
- "Against All Odds (Take a Look at Me Now)" on YouTube

"Against All Odds (Take a Look at Me Now)" is a song recorded by American singer-songwriter Mariah Carey. It is a cover of the song of the same title written and recorded by Phil Collins. Carey co-produced the cover with Jimmy Jam and Terry Lewis for her seventh studio album Rainbow (1999). It was released on as the fifth and final single from Rainbow on May 29, 2000, by Columbia Records. It became her final single release with Sony Music, as she left the label in April 2001, until the release of "Infinity" in 2015.

"Against All Odds (Take a Look at Me Now)" was not released as a single in the United States but attained top-10 peaks in the Czech Republic, Norway, and Portugal. The song's accompanying music video, directed by Paul Misbehoven, consists of a montage of Carey performing the song throughout various Rainbow World Tour (2000) shows. Carey re-recorded the song as a duet with Irish boy band Westlife; the version was released as a single on September 18, 2000. A commercial success, the duet reached number one in Ireland and the United Kingdom, and the top five in Croatia, Denmark, Portugal, and Sweden.

== Critical reception ==
"Against All Odds (Take a Look at Me Now)" received positive reviews from music critics. Danyel Smith of Entertainment Weekly wrote: "Listeners with an eye on the tabloids could read her close, ringing interpretation of Phil Collins' 1984 hit, 'Against All Odds (Take a Look at Me Now)', as a postmortem on her bittersweet affair with Yankee shortstop Derek Jeter and a poignant evocation of the couple's shared mixed-race heritage ('You're the only one who really knew me at all')." Los Angeles Times' Elysa Gardner called this cover "surprisingly faithful, forthright" and "she resists her tendency to over-embellish notes and focuses on what really matters: the melody and lyrics".

MTV Asia editor Dara Cook wrote: "Mariah festoons herself in Phil Collins' 1980s melodic garb, appropriately pret a porter with overwrought emotion. She delicately ascends the sparely accompanied first verses—but alas, that damn drum roll soon sounds and the bouffant strings and vocal gymnastics ensue." Rolling Stone's Arion Berger was less laudatory, calling the recording a cover of a "drippy Eighties power-pop hit".

== Duet version ==
"Against All Odds"

Single by Mariah Carey featuring Westlife

from the album Coast to Coast and the reissue of Rainbow
- Released: September 18, 2000
- Recorded: 1999–2000
- Studio: Capri Digital (Capri); Flyte Tyme (Edina); Olympic (London); Parc (Orlando); Rokstone (London)
- Genre: Pop; R&B
- Length: 3:25
- Label: Columbia
- Songwriter: Phil Collins
- Producers: Mariah Carey; Steve Mac

Mariah Carey singles chronology
"Against All Odds (Take a Look at Me Now)" (2000)	"Against All Odds" (2000)	"Loverboy" (2001)

Westlife singles chronology
"Fool Again" (2000)	"Against All Odds" (2000)	"My Love" (2000)

Audio sample
- 20 second sample of Mariah Carey and Westlife's "Against All Odds": file; help

Music video
- "Against All Odds" on YouTube

Carey later released a duet version of the song, simply titled "Against All Odds", featuring newly recorded vocals by Irish boy band Westlife. The version was released as the lead single from Westlife's second album Coast to Coast (2000) on September 18, 2000, also being included on the reissue of Carey's Rainbow. Carey's vocals from the solo version were retained for the duet, though a new instrumental track was produced by Carey and Steve Mac, featuring a more organic sound with violins. The music video shows Carey and Westlife recording the song and exploring the island of Capri by boat.

"Against All Odds" debuted atop the UK Singles Chart, selling 112,000 copies. It remained at number one in its second week, selling a further 78,500 copies. The song became Carey's second non-consecutive and Westlife's sixth consecutive number-one single on the chart. "Against All Odds" also spent three weeks at number one in Ireland, and peaked at number three on the European Hot 100 Singles. Its chart success in European countries led to its inclusion on international editions of Carey's compilation albums Greatest Hits (2001) and #1 to Infinity (2015).

== Track listings and formats ==
European CD single

1. "Against All Odds (Take a Look at Me Now)" (album version) – 3:25
2. "Crybaby" – 5:19

European and South African maxi CD single

1. "Against All Odds (Take a Look at Me Now)" (album version) – 3:25
2. "Crybaby" – 5:19
3. "Thank God I Found You" (Stargate radio edit) – 4:21
4. "Can't Take That Away (Mariah's Theme)" (Morales club mix edit) – 3:57

UK maxi CD single 1

1. "Against All Odds" (featuring Westlife) – 3:21
2. "Against All Odds (Take a Look at Me Now)" (Pound Boys main mix) – 9:09
3. "Against All Odds" (Mariah only version) – 3:21
4. "Westlife Interview" (video)

UK maxi CD single 2

1. "Against All Odds" (featuring Westlife) – 3:21
2. "Against All Odds" (Westlife only version) – 3:21
3. "Against All Odds (Take a Look at Me Now)" (Pound Boys dub) – 6:48
4. "Against All Odds" (music video)

UK cassette single

1. "Against All Odds" (featuring Westlife) – 3:21
2. "Against All Odds (Take a Look at Me Now)" (Pound Boys radio edit) – 3:37

Japanese maxi CD single

1. "Against All Odds" (featuring Westlife) – 3:20
2. "Against All Odds (Take a Look at Me Now)" (album version) – 3:26
3. "Against All Odds (Take a Look at Me Now)" (Pound Boys radio edit) – 3:32
4. "Against All Odds" (instrumental) – 3:20

Australian maxi CD single

1. "Against All Odds" (featuring Westlife) – 3:20
2. "Against All Odds (Take a Look at Me Now)" (album version) – 3:26
3. "Against All Odds (Take a Look at Me Now)" (Pound Boys main mix) – 9:09

Digital EP

1. "Against All Odds" (featuring Westlife) – 3:21
2. "Against All Odds (Take a Look at Me Now)" (album version) – 3:25
3. "Against All Odds (Take a Look at Me Now)" (Pound Boys radio edit) – 3:37
4. "Against All Odds (Take a Look at Me Now)" (Pound Boys main mix) – 9:09
5. "Against All Odds (Take a Look at Me Now)" (Pound Boys deep dub) – 8:12
6. "Against All Odds (Take a Look at Me Now)" (Pound Boys dub) – 6:56

== Charts ==
=== Weekly charts ===
2000 weekly chart performance
Chart	Peak position
Belgium (Ultratop 50 Flanders)	26
Belgium (Ultratop 50 Wallonia)	15
Czech Republic (Rádio – Top 100)	10
European Hot 100 Singles (Music & Media)	36
France (SNEP)	18
Germany (GfK)	29
Italy (FIMI)	17
Netherlands (Dutch Top 40) with "Crybaby"	27
Netherlands (Single Top 100)	20
Norway (VG-lista)	2
Portugal (AFP)	9
Switzerland (Schweizer Hitparade)	20
US NAC/Smooth Jazz (Radio & Records)	28

2000 weekly chart performance for the duet version
Chart	Peak position
Australia (ARIA)	52
Belgium (Ultratop 50 Flanders)	50
Belgium (Ultratop 50 Wallonia)	31
Croatia (HRT)	2
Denmark (IFPI)	2
European Hot 100 Singles (Music & Media)	3
European Hit Radio (Music & Media)	29
Ireland (IRMA)	1
Japan (Oricon)	78
Netherlands (Dutch Top 40)	35
Netherlands (Single Top 100)	29
Poland Airplay (Music & Media)	16
Portugal (AFP)	4
Scottish Singles Sales (Official Charts)	1
Sweden (Sverigetopplistan)	3
UK Singles (Official Charts)	1
UK Airplay (Music Week)	10

=== Year-end charts ===
2000 year-end chart performance
Chart	Position
Belgium (Ultratop 50 Wallonia)	42
France (SNEP)	74
Netherlands (Dutch Top 40)	200
Switzerland (Schweizer Hitparade)	93

2000 year-end chart performance for the duet version
Chart	Position
Brazil (Crowley)	95
European Hot 100 Singles (Music & Media)	47
European Hit Radio (Music & Media)	34
Ireland (IRMA)	8
Sweden (Hitlistan)	47
UK Singles (Official Charts)	28

2001 year-end chart performance for the duet version
Chart	Position
Taiwan (Hito Radio)	58

== Certifications ==
Certifications and sales for the duet version
Region	Certification	Certified units/sales
Denmark (IFPI Danmark)	Gold	4,576
Sweden (GLF)	Gold	15,000^{^}
United Kingdom (BPI)	Platinum	600,000^{‡}
^{^} Shipments figures based on certification alone.^{‡} Sales+streaming figures based on certification alone.

== Release history ==
Release dates and formats
Region	Date	Format(s)	Version(s)	Label(s)	Ref.
Germany	May 29, 2000	CD; maxi CD	Original	Sony	
France	June 13, 2000	Maxi CD	Original	Columbia	
United Kingdom	September 18, 2000	Maxi CD	Original; duet	Columbia	
United Kingdom	September 18, 2000	Cassette; maxi CD	Duet	Columbia	
France	September 25, 2000	Maxi CD	Duet	Columbia	
Japan	September 27, 2000	Maxi CD	Original; duet	Sony Japan	
Australia	October 23, 2000	Maxi CD	Original; duet	Sony	
Various	October 9, 2020	Digital download; streaming (EP)	Original; duet; Pound Boys remixes	Columbia; Legacy	
