= Petals (Mariah Carey song) =

1999 song by Mariah Carey

Song by Mariah Carey

from the album Rainbow
- Studio: Capri Digital Studios (Capri, Italy); Flyte Tyme Studios (Edina, MN)
- Length: 4:23
- Label: Columbia
- Composers: Mariah Carey; James Harris III; Terry Lewis; James Wright
- Lyricist: Mariah Carey
- Producers: Jimmy Jam; Terry Lewis; Mariah Carey

Audio
- "Petals" on YouTube

"Petals" is a song by the American singer Mariah Carey from her seventh studio album, Rainbow (1999). Carey co-wrote and co-produced the song with James Wright and its other producers, Jimmy Jam and Terry Lewis. It became available as the album's twelfth track on November 2, 1999, when Rainbow was released by Columbia Records. "Petals" is often compared to other personal and introspective songs in Carey's catalog by music critics.

== Background ==
Carey and her husband, Sony Music executive Tommy Mottola, separated from their marriage in 1997. Carey's working relationship with Sony became complicated as a result. Two years later by spring season, Carey had started to create Rainbow, which would end up being the last one in her contract with Columbia Records. The complications between Carey and her label impacted her collaboration with Walter Afanasieff, who had served as a songwriting partner throughout the early years of her career. Carey began conducting sessions with several other songwriters and producers for the new album, also inviting Jimmy Jam and Terry Lewis, with whom Carey co-wrote and co-produced the song "Thank God I Found You". When Jam and Lewis first started working with Carey, they had not clearly gauged what Carey wanted them to do. In an interview with Fred Bronson, Jam and Lewis explained:

It wasn't like Janet [Jackson], where we all grew up together. Mariah had done her own thing and had been very involved with the arranging and production of her records, so we respected that and said, 'What can we do for you?' She would fly into town for five or six hours. She'd get on a plane and fly to whatever was the next thing she was doing.

Before Rainbow was recorded, Mariah and her sister, Alison Carey became estranged and faced difficulties in their relationship. Alison had received a positive HIV test at some point after she turned 27 in late 1988. Later, in 1994, when her second son was just 7 years old, he was taken away from her by Alison and Mariah's mother, Patricia Carey. She continued to call Mariah the reason for many of her problems and relationship problems during the following years. In 1990, when Mariah debuted with her first studio album, dedicating it to Alison, she began paying for Alison's continuous visits to drug rehabilitation. On February 6, 1995, in an interview with Nancy Glass from the news show American Journal, Alison stated that Mariah only dedicated the album to her to make herself look good, and that it was beneath contempt. Carey eventually created the song "Petals," which she believed showcased the most honest lyrics she had ever written.

== Composition ==
"Petals" is four minutes and 23 seconds long. Carey, Jam, and Lewis produced the song, with Jim Wright joining in arranging and composing. Wright played keyboards and Mike Scott played guitar. Dana Jon Chappelle, Manuel Forolfi, and Alessandro R. A. Benedetti provided engineering. Steve Hodge, Xavier Smith, and Brad Yost handled mixing, with Smith also helming drum programming. Nicki Richards provided background vocals.

While reviewing Rainbow, Dara Cook from MTV wrote that "the sparse 'Petals,' with its tidally rushing and receding drums, floats Mariah's surprisingly sincere lyrics and subtle phrasing: 'I gravitated towards a patriarch/So young predictably/I was resigned to spend my life/With a maze of misery.' "Hmm wonder who that is?" Danyel Smith from Entertainment Weekly surmised that "the whispery, heartbreaking 'Petals' alludes to Carey's shattered family life and marriage to Sony Music chief Tommy Mottola".

Carey described the song's intention in an interview, declaring that writing a personal song like it about an intimate situation provided her with an important outlet. She believed it captured complex emotions about people close to her and the personal impact of their actions. To match this emotional depth, she chose to sing in her lower register, adding a soft, breathy tone that complements the song's arrangement.

== Critical reception ==
Over the years, critics have kept comparing "Petals" to other Carey songs. Slant Magazine's Sal Cinquemani believed the song "Twister" from the 2001 Glitter soundtrack was autobiographical in the same vein as "Petals" and "Looking In" from her 1995 album Daydream. In 2014, Billboard's Andrew Hampp stated that Me. I Am Mariah... The Elusive Chanteuse (2014) showcased Carey's "intro-spective, 'morose' side" in a way similar to "Petals" and "Close My Eyes" from her 1997 album Butterfly. In 2015, Tshepo Mokoena even likened "All I Want for Christmas Is You" to "Petals", "Looking In", and "Outside", as songs that drew from the melancholy of her "difficult childhood".

Andrew Chan stated: "Take, for example, the sneering bridge of 'Petals,' a song from 1999: 'So many I considered closest to me / turned on a dime and sold me out dutifully.' We know now, from her memoir, that these lines refer to family members who benefited from her financial support without having her best interests at heart." He believed that, like "Looking In", "Petals" exposed "her resentments in diaristic fashion".

== Credits and personnel ==
Credits are adapted from the liner notes of Rainbow.

- Mariah Carey – producer, vocal, composer, background vocals, performer, lyricist, arranger
- Jimmy Jam – producer, arranger, composer, lyricist
- Terry Lewis – producer, composer, lyricist, arranger
- Jim Wright – arranger, composer, keyboards
- Mike Scott – guitar
- Dana Jon Chappelle – engineer
- Lee Blaske – arranger
- Steve Hodge – mixing
- Xavier Smith – mixing, drum programming
- Manuel Forolfi – engineer
- Brad Yost – mixing
- Alessandro R. A. Benedetti – engineer
- Nicki Richards – background vocals

== Works cited ==
- Bronson, Fred (2003), The Billboard Book of Number 1 Hits, New York: Billboard Books, ISBN 0-8230-7677-6
- Shapiro, Marc (2001), Mariah Carey: The Unauthorized Biography, Toronto: ECW Press, ISBN 1-55022-444-1
- Chan, Andrew (September 12, 2023). Why Mariah Carey Matters. University of Texas Press. ISBN 978-1477325070.
