= Can't Take That Away (Mariah's Theme) =

2000 single by Mariah Carey

- North American and Japanese editions cover

Single by Mariah Carey

from the album Rainbow
- A-side: "Crybaby"
- B-side: "Love Hangover"/"Heartbreaker"
- Released: April 17, 2000
- Recorded: 1999
- Studio: Capri Digital (Capri); Flyte Tyme (Edina); Record Plant (Los Angeles)
- Genre: Pop; R&B
- Length: 4:32
- Label: Columbia
- Songwriters: Mariah Carey; Diane Warren
- Producers: Mariah Carey; Jimmy Jam and Terry Lewis

Mariah Carey singles chronology
"Things That U Do" (2000)	"Can't Take That Away (Mariah's Theme)" (2000)	"Crybaby" (2000)

Music video
- "Can't Take That Away (Mariah's Theme)" on YouTube

"Can't Take That Away (Mariah's Theme)" is a song recorded by the American singer-songwriter Mariah Carey for her seventh studio album Rainbow (1999). It was written by Carey and Diane Warren, and produced by Carey and Jimmy Jam and Terry Lewis. The song is a pop-R&B ballad driven by an instrumentation comprising violin, piano and organ. Lyrically, the song encourages perseverance. It was released as the third single from Rainbow, as a double A-side single with "Crybaby", on April 17, 2000, by Columbia Records.

"Can't Take That Away (Mariah's Theme)" was well received by critics, many of whom complimented its lyricism and Carey's vocal performance. It was the center of a public dispute between Carey and her label Sony Music, based on what she perceived to be weak promotion of the single. Due to its limited release, it was ineligible to chart on the US Billboard Hot 100, though it managed to reach number six on the US Dance Club Songs.

Two music videos were filmed for "Can't Take That Away (Mariah's Theme)". Both feature personal videos left by five fans, retelling their stories of adversity and how the song had inspired them. Additionally, a large screen is shown next to Carey throughout the video, displaying inspirational stories from famous athletes. The ending differs in both videos, with one climaxing on the balcony overlooking the city, while the other by a large indoor window. Carey performed the song on programs such as Today and The View, as well as her Rainbow World Tour (2000), Charmbracelet World Tour (2002–2003), Australian Tour (2013), Caution World Tour (2019), and concert residency The Butterfly Returns (2018–2020).

== Background ==
According to Carey, writing "Can't Take That Away (Mariah's Theme)" helped her get through rough emotional moments with her label's management, and even times when she felt overwhelmed by others. During the early stages of the album, Carey said she felt pressured to complete the Rainbow album as quickly as possible, due to the fact that it was the last album under her contract with Columbia. During troubled times for the singer, as well as her divorce from record executive Tommy Mottola, she claimed writing and singing the song helped her get through troubled times and hoped her listeners would get the same message out of it. Carey wrote it to become an anthem for fans and listeners who were going through difficult times in their life and could relate to the song. Additionally, during the taping of the Mariah Carey Homecoming Special, Carey told audience members that after the Columbine High School massacre in 1999, she felt the song would help family members and friends of the victims during the tragedy, and hoped it would give them strength to get by the tragic event. For that reason, Carey included the song on the album, and campaigned for its radio release in mid-2000.

== Composition and lyrical content ==
"Can't Take That Away (Mariah's Theme)"
A 27-second sample of the song's chorus, featuring Carey's personal message left in the lyrics, including the melody composed with Warren.

"Can't Take That Away (Mariah's Theme)" is a slow tempo song that blends pop and R&B beats. Additionally, it incorporates its sound from several instruments including the violin, piano and organ. The ballad is set in the signature of common time, with a slowly tempo of 51 beats per minute. It is written in the key of A major, with Carey's vocals spanning almost three octaves, from the low note of A_{2} to the high note of F#_{5}. The song was written by Carey and Diane Warren. Although there were no conflicts during the recording process, the pair had minor disagreements during the songwriting stages: Carey said that Warren liked to repeat lyrical phrases often. The second song that Carey and Warren wrote together was "There for Me" which was released as a B-side to the "Never Too Far/Hero Medley" charity single Carey recorded in late 2001. The song's protagonist details the struggles of dealing with people who put you down, and how to overcome these struggles through faith, courage, and the power of God. Carey explains in the song's lyrics how although people can try to make her feel down and depressed, no matter what happens, she can't let them win: "There's a light in me that shines brightly. They can try but they can't take that away from me."

== Label dispute ==
As with Butterfly two years prior, Rainbow became the center of a conflict in between Carey and her label. After Carey's divorce with Sony record official and Columbia CEO Tommy Mottola, the working relationship with Carey and her label deteriorated. After the first two singles from Rainbow were released, Carey was gearing up for a third single to be released. She intended for "Can't Take That Away (Mariah's Theme)" to be the next single, as it held very personal lyrical content. However, after getting wind of her plan, Sony made it clear that the album needed a more up-beat and urban track to warm airwaves. These different opinions led to a very public feud in between them, as Carey began posting messages on her webpage during early and mid-2000, telling fans inside information on the scandal, as well as instructing them to request "Can't Take That Away (Mariah's Theme)" on radio stations. One of the messages Carey left on her page read:

"Basically, a lot of you know the political situation in my professional career is not positive. It's been really, really hard. I don't even know if this message is going to get to you because I don't know if they want you to hear this. I'm getting a lot of negative feedback from certain corporate people. But I am not willing to give up."

Carey's actions were given mixed reception, with critics and executives both commending her bold actions towards a song she felt needed to be heard, while others criticized her for publicizing the scandal further. Soon after, Sony involved themselves further, stripping Carey's webpage of any messages and began trying to reach an agreement with her. Fearing the loss of their label's highest seller, and the best-selling artist of the decade, Sony chose to release the song. Carey, initially content with the agreement, soon found out that the song had only been allowed a very limited and low-promotion release, not allowing the song to chart on the official US chart, and making international charting extremely difficult and unlikely.

== Critical reception ==
"Can't Take That Away (Mariah's Theme)" was generally commended by contemporary music critics. In his review for Rainbow, Stephen Thomas Erlewine from Allmusic named the song one of the album's top three picks. Danyel Smith from Entertainment Weekly called the song the "emotional center of the album" and wrote "There's a light in me/That shines brightly, she sings. The song (co-written with Diane Warren and co-produced with Jam and Lewis) resonates with new life experience—a kind of truth and uplift." Elysa Gardner, editor from the Los Angeles Times, called the song "earnestly passionate" and felt Carey sounded her "most impressive" on the song. Amy Linden from Vibe also reviewed the song positively, calling Carey's vocal performance in the song "emotional" and "graceful." Additionally, Linden wrote "It could very well be Carey's version of Nas' "Hate Me Now"; she makes it through all the trials and tribulations undaunted."

== Chart performance ==
The release of the song as a single was surrounded by conflict between Carey and Sony Music Entertainment. Due to Billboard rules at the time of the song's release, charting credit was not given to "Can't Take That Away (Mariah's Theme)" but to "Crybaby", the song it shared a double A-side with. The song managed to chart on the dance singles chart in the United States, reaching the top ten on the Hot Dance Club Play chart. Due to the song's weak promotional release, it was not released together with "Crybaby" outside the United States, where it performed poorly due to its radio-only premiere. It charted for one week in Belgium (Wallonia), where it peaked at number forty on the official singles chart. Similarly in the Netherlands, "Can't Take That Away (Mariah's Theme)" peaked at number sixty-five on the Dutch Singles Chart, however spending nine weeks fluctuating in the chart.

== Music videos and remixes ==
The second take of the video, featuring the alternate ending with Carey by the window, as the rainbow resolves her pain and hardship

Two music videos were shot for "Can't Take That Away," both directed by Sanaa Hamri in New York City. The creation of the video involved some of Carey's fans: two weeks prior to filming, they were invited via her website to send in video clips of themselves, telling her of the hardships in their lives and how the song had inspired them to look at life differently, and had given them strength. A contest was held, and video clips from five fans were chosen for inclusion in the video. The clips were featured in the video's introduction, where Carey reacts to her fan's struggles which included personal insecurities, the problems of being part of a racial or social minority, and being victimized by verbal harassment.

The original edit of the music video begins with a message to those fans that sent in their videos; "Thank you to all those who chose to share their stories with the world." Subsequently, a personal message left by Carey is shown, reading "After every storm, if you look hard enough, a rainbow appears..." Five testimonials from fans are shown, each telling of their own personal problems and hardships. In her testimonial, the third girl says "I am fourteen years old, I'm a high school student, there is not one day that goes by that people don't make fun of me about my race." The fifth girl says "Mariah's Theme, Can't Take That Away, is like, self-confident. Don't be afraid to dream." After the last girl reads her message, Carey is shown lying on pillows on the floor of her sparse living room, watching television. As she tearfully sings, she watches as different empowering messages and events are shown on the screen. Towards the end of the musical bridge, Carey stands up from the floor and exits onto a large balcony overlooking the city. Rain begins to fall as Carey waves her arms and cries out singing the song's climax. Her depression is resolved when the rain stops and a rainbow forms, prompting her to smile.

The video was quickly pulled after its release because it contained technical errors. The clips of the people on Carey's television had their struggles captioned in dark text on a dark background, making it difficult to read. There were also continuity errors during the rainy balcony scene, as Carey's shirt would alternate between being soaking wet and dry. Consequently, a new music video was completed, which retained the clips of Carey's fans at the beginning but fixed the captions and replaced most of the interior shots of Carey with new footage. At the beginning of the video, Carey is seen writing in her diary in a new and more furnished living room, with a large pair of windows aside a mural of large throw pillows and candle. Carey, after watching the messages in the original living room, goes upstairs into the new living room, where she finishes the song. As with the previous filming of the video, Carey's pain and sadness is resolved with a rainbow, shown at the end of the video.

Most remixes of "Can't Take That Away (Mariah's Theme)" were released in the US only, although few were found in certain territories. David Morales produced the Morales club mix, which uses the song's original vocals with similar chord progressions to those of the original, and the Morales Triumphant mix, which contains re-recorded vocals and new lyrics which transform the song into a jazz-like mix with harmonica sections. A spoken introduction was also added, featuring Carey's spoken voice before the first verse.

== Live performances ==
Although "Can't Take That Away (Mariah's Theme)" was never fully released as a single, Carey felt very strongly about the song and therefore promoted it through several live television and award show appearances. Carey's first live performance of the song was on The Today Show as part of a mini-concert which aired live on November 2, 1999, from Rockefeller Center in New York. Following the concert on The Today Show, Carey performed the song live at the 2000 Blockbuster Entertainment Awards, where she was presented as a featured performer. Carey further promoted "Can't Take That Away (Mariah's Theme)" with a performance on VH1 Divas 2000: A Tribute to Diana Ross, where she also performed a mashup of "Heartbreaker" with Ross's "Love Hangover" which was added as a track on the single release. After the release of "Against All Odds (Take a Look at Me Now)", the album's final single, Carey sang them both live on The View in mid-2000. On October 30, 1999, Carey filmed a private concert held at her old high school in Huntington, Long Island, where she taped a special for the Fox Broadcasting Company titled Mariah Carey Homecoming Special, which aired in December of that year. Aside from television performances, the song was part of the set-list on both the Rainbow World Tour, which coincided with the release and promotion of Rainbow, as well as the Charmbracelet World Tour in 2002–03. She has performed the song recently in her last two concerts in Marrakech, Morocco, and at the Mawazine Festival, and Monaco. The remix version was the opening number for her concerts in Australia during January 2013. Carey started performing the single for the first time after 5 years on her second concert residency placed in Las Vegas, The Butterfly Returns in 2018. She also performed it at her Caution World Tour in 2019, in its remixed version.

== Track listings and formats ==
US 7-inch vinyl

1. "Can't Take That Away (Mariah's Theme)" (album version) – 4:32
2. "Crybaby" (album version) (featuring Snoop Dogg) – 5:19

US 12-inch vinyl

1. "Can't Take That Away (Mariah's Theme)" (Morales club mix) – 7:46
2. "Can't Take That Away (Mariah's Theme)" (Morales instrumental) – 7:45
3. "Can't Take That Away (Mariah's Theme)" (album version) – 4:32
4. "Can't Take That Away (Mariah's Theme)" (Morales Revival Triumphant mix) – 10:30
5. "Crybaby" (album version) (featuring Snoop Dogg) – 5:19

US cassette single

1. "Can't Take That Away (Mariah's Theme)" (album version) – 4:32
2. "Love Hangover"/"Heartbreaker" (live at VH1 Divas 2000) – 5:15
3. "Crybaby" (album version) (featuring Snoop Dogg) – 5:19

US CD single

1. "Can't Take That Away (Mariah's Theme)" (album version) – 4:32
2. "Crybaby" (album version) (featuring Snoop Dogg) – 5:19
3. "Love Hangover"/"Heartbreak" (live at VH1 Divas 2000) – 5:15

North American and South African maxi CD single

1. "Can't Take That Away (Mariah's Theme)" (Morales Revival Triumphant mix) – 10:30
2. "Can't Take That Away (Mariah's Theme)" (Morales club mix) – 7:46
3. "Can't Take That Away (Mariah's Theme)" (Morales instrumental) – 7:45
4. "Crybaby" (album version) (featuring Snoop Dogg) – 5:19
5. "Can't Take That Away (Mariah's Theme)" (album version) – 4:32

Japanese CD single

1. "Can't Take That Away (Mariah's Theme)" (album version) – 4:32
2. "Can't Take That Away (Mariah's Theme)" (Morales club mix edit) – 3:59
3. "Love Hangover"/"Heartbreaker" (live at VH1 Divas 2000) – 5:15

European 12-inch vinyl

1. "Can't Take That Away (Mariah's Theme)" (Morales club mix) – 7:46
2. "Can't Take That Away (Mariah's Theme)" (Morales instrumental) – 7:45
3. "Can't Take That Away (Mariah's Theme)" (Morales Revival Triumphant mix) – 10:30
4. "Can't Take That Away (Mariah's Theme)" (Morales club mix edit) – 3:57

European CD single

1. "Can't Take That Away (Mariah's Theme)" (radio edit) – 4:01
2. "Can't Take That Away (Mariah's Theme)" (Morales club mix edit) – 3:57

European maxi CD single

1. "Can't Take That Away (Mariah's Theme)" (album version) – 4:32
2. "Can't Take That Away (Mariah's Theme)" (Morales club mix) – 7:46
3. "Can't Take That Away (Mariah's Theme)" (Morales instrumental) – 7:45
4. "Can't Take That Away (Mariah's Theme)" (Morales club mix edit) – 3:57

Digital EP

1. "Can't Take That Away (Mariah's Theme)" (radio edit) – 4:03
2. "Can't Take That Away (Mariah's Theme)" (Morales club mix edit) – 3:58
3. "Can't Take That Away (Mariah's Theme)" (Morales club mix) – 7:37
4. "Can't Take That Away (Mariah's Theme)" (Morales Revival Triumphant mix) – 10:27
5. "Can't Take That Away (Mariah's Theme)" (Morales instrumental) – 7:39

== Credits and personnel ==
Credits adapted from the Rainbow liner notes.

- Mariah Carey – co-production, songwriting, vocals
- Diane Warren – songwriting
- Jimmy Jam and Terry Lewis – co-production
- Shockley – drums
- Merilee Klemp – oboe
- Mike Scott – guitar
- Daryl Skobba – cello
- Joshua Koestenbaum – cello
- Alice Preves – viola
- Tamas Strasser – viola
- Brenda Mickens – violin
- David Mickens – violin
- Elizabeth Sobieski – violin
- Elsa Nilsson – violin
- James Riccardo – violin
- John Kennedy – violin
- Michal Sobieski – violin
- Thomas Kornacker – violin
- Steve Hodge – mixing
- Dana Jon Chappelle – engineer
- Bob Ludwig – mastering

== Charts ==
=== Weekly charts ===
2000 weekly chart performance
Chart	Peak position
Belgium (Ultratip Bubbling Under Flanders)	7
Belgium (Ultratop 50 Wallonia)	40
Italy (FIMI)	45
Netherlands (Dutch Top 40 Tipparade)	5
Netherlands (Single Top 100)	65
UK Club (Music Week) with "Crybaby"	40
UK Urban Club (Music Week) with "Crybaby"	19
US Dance Club Songs (Billboard)	6
US Dance Singles Sales (Billboard)	3
US Adult Contemporary (Radio & Records)	29

=== Year-end charts ===
2000 year-end chart performance
Chart	Position
US Adult Contemporary (Radio & Records)	93

== Release history ==
Release dates and formats (Note: released as a double A-side single with "Crybaby" in North America)
Region	Date	Format(s)	Label(s)	Ref.
Canada	April 17, 2000	Maxi CD	Sony	
United States	April 17, 2000	Adult contemporary radio; hot adult contemporary radio	Columbia	
United States	June 6, 2000	7-inch vinyl; 12-inch vinyl; cassette; CD; maxi CD	Columbia	
Japan	June 28, 2000	CD	Sony Japan	
France	October 24, 2000	Maxi CD	Columbia	
Various	October 9, 2020	Digital download; streaming (EP)	Legacy	
