= Rainbow World Tour =

2000 concert tour by Mariah Carey

- Tour by Mariah Carey
- Location: Asia; Europe; North America
- Associated album: Rainbow
- Start date: February 14, 2000
- End date: April 18, 2000
- Legs: 3
- No. of shows: 19
- Attendance: 234,541
- Box office: US $6.4 million ($11.97 million in 2025 dollars)

Mariah Carey concert chronology
- Butterfly World Tour (1998); Rainbow World Tour (2000); Charmbracelet World Tour (2003–04)

The Rainbow World Tour was the fourth concert tour in 2000 by American singer-songwriter Mariah Carey, and supported her seventh studio album, Rainbow (1999). The tour started in Europe on February 14, in Antwerp, Belgium, also an itinerary that included North America, and ended on April 18, in Toronto. The tour's nine-date North American leg grossed $7.1 million according to Billboard.

The Rainbow World Tour received mixed reviews, with some reviewers criticizing Carey's vocal decline and confusing staging, while others praised it as a lively celebration of her career. Despite the divided reception, many critics felt the tour marked a bold shift in her image and performance style.

== Background ==
The Rainbow World Tour was Carey's fourth headlining and third worldwide tour, consisting of nineteen shows across Europe, Asia, the United States, and Canada. While her previous two tours were limited to Europe and Asia following the lukewarm reception of her 1993 U.S. debut tour, the Music Box Tour, the overwhelming success of those international stops — marked by record-breaking ticket sales in Asia and rapid sellouts in Europe — gave Carey the confidence to return to her home country. The tour ultimately became her first U.S. trek in seven years, with tickets for the entire North American leg selling out within days. In addition to revisiting key international markets, Carey expanded her itinerary by performing in Singapore for the first time. The setlist blended songs from Rainbow with many of her earlier hits, offering fans a comprehensive showcase of her career. U.S. shows featured Missy Elliott and Da Brat as opening acts, while Trey Lorenz once again joined Carey as a backing vocalist. Notably, although Dallas, Texas, appeared on tour merchandise, the show was never scheduled.

The Toronto Star reported that the concert in Toronto was filmed for a future television special, but it never aired. Footage recorded from the tour was used for the music video for "Against All Odds (Take a Look at Me Now)".

== Critical response ==
The tour received generally mixed reviews. Some critics and fans reproached her of having a "tired and hoarse voice," while others commented on Carey's choice of wardrobe. Despite these criticisms, several critics and many concert-goers praised the tour, calling it an intense celebration of Carey's career.

Phil Gallo of Variety said: "Mariah Carey's show begs for either simplicity or coherency", and called the show a visual "mess". While reflecting that this was the first time Mariah was scantily clad touring, Jim DeRogatis from the Chicago Sun-Times said that Carey had "been transformed from a wannabe Whitney to a wannabe Britney", and called her approach to concert performance "difficult to fathom" considering she was "the only artist to have scored a No. 1 hit in every year of the '90s, selling some 125 million records worldwide."

== Set list ==
The following set list is from the February 17 concert in Milan. It is not intended to represent all dates throughout the tour.

1. "Mariah & Bianca" (Introduction) (contains elements of "Rainbow (Interlude)" and "Butterfly")
2. "Emotions"
3. "My All"
4. "Dreamlover"
5. "X-Girlfriend"
6. "Vulnerability" (Video interlude)
7. "Against All Odds (Take a Look at Me Now)"
8. "Without You"
9. "Make It Happen"
10. "Thank God I Found You" (performed with Trey Lorenz) (contains elements of the Make It Last Remix)
11. "Make You Happy" (Interlude) (performed by Trey Lorenz)
12. "Fantasy" (Bad Boy Remix)
13. "Always Be My Baby"
14. "Crybaby"
15. "Close My Eyes"
16. "Petals"
17. "Can't Take That Away (Mariah's Theme)"
18. "Money Ain't a Thang" (Dance Interlude)
19. "Heartbreaker" (contains elements of the Desert Storm Remix)
20. "Honey" (contains elements of the Bad Boy Remix)
21. "Vision of Love"
22. "Rainbow" (Interlude)
23. "Hero"
24. "Butterfly Reprise" (Outro)
Notes
- During the opening show in Antwerp, Carey performed "Sweetheart".
- "Make It Happen" was cut from the set list on February 23.
- Starting on February 29, "Without You" was no longer performed.
- "All I Want for Christmas Is You" was temporarily performed from March 4 to 9.
- The "Vulnerability" video interlude was cut from the set list on March 4.
- "Vision of Love" was not performed in Tokyo.
- Carey sang a snippet of Lauryn Hill's "Ex-Factor" in Singapore.
- Starting on March 13, "Always Be My Baby" was moved up earlier in the set list, being performed after "My All". Additionally, "Heartbreaker" was performed before "Dreamlover".
- A snippet of "Daydream Interlude (Fantasy Sweet Dub Mix)" was performed in Los Angeles, San Jose, Boston and Toronto.
- A snippet of "Vanishing" was performed in Las Vegas.
- A medley of "I Still Believe" and "Pure Imagination" was performed in Singapore and Los Angeles.
- A snippet of "Breakdown" was performed in Los Angeles and Chicago.
- "(You're Puttin') A Rush On Me" and "Slipping Away" were performed in Chicago. Additionally, 98 Degrees joined Carey onstage to perform "Thank God I Found You".

== Shows ==
List of concerts, showing date, city, country, venue, opening act, tickets sold, number of available tickets and amount of gross revenue
Date	City	Country	Venue	Attendance	Revenue
Europe
February 14, 2000	Antwerp	Belgium	Sportpaleis		
February 17, 2000	Milan	Italy	Fila Forum		
February 20, 2000	Cologne	Germany	Kölnarena		
February 23, 2000	Paris	France	Palais Omnisports de Paris-Bercy		
February 26, 2000	London	England	Wembley Arena		
February 29, 2000	Madrid	Spain	Palacio de Deportes		
Asia
March 4, 2000	Osaka	Japan	Osaka Dome	~35,000 - ~40,000 / ?	—N/a
March 7, 2000 (Note: The concerts of March 7 and March 9, 2000, were originally scheduled to take place at Tokyo Metropolitan Gymnasium.)	Tokyo	Japan	Tokyo Dome	100,000 / 100,000	—N/a
March 9, 2000	Tokyo	Japan	Tokyo Dome	100,000 / 100,000	—N/a
March 13, 2000	Singapore		National Stadium	—N/a	—N/a
North America
March 16, 2000	Los Angeles	United States	Staples Center	15,627 / 15,627	$990,648
March 18, 2000	Las Vegas	United States	Thomas & Mack Center	13,591 / 13,591	$681,068
March 21, 2000	San Jose	United States	San Jose Arena	13,999 / 13,999	$862,170
March 25, 2000	Chicago	United States	United Center	14,892 / 14,892	$848,156
March 29, 2000	Miami	United States	American Airlines Arena	12,008 / 12,008	$662,514
April 1, 2000	Atlanta	United States	Philips Arena	12,956 / 12,956	$664,229
April 11, 2000	New York City	United States	Madison Square Garden	14,870 / 14,870	$1,066,413
April 13, 2000 (Note: The April 13, 2000 concert in Boston, Massachusetts at the Fleet Center was originally planned to take place on April 4 but was rescheduled due to illness.)	Boston	United States	FleetCenter	—N/a	—N/a
April 18, 2000 (Note: The April 18, 2000 concert in Toronto, Ontario at the Air Canada Centre was originally planned to take place on April 7 but was rescheduled due to illness.)	Toronto	Canada	Air Canada Centre	13,598 / 13,598	$606,118
Total				234,541 / 234,541 (100%)	$6,381,316

== Personnel ==
- Randy Jackson – musical director
- Eric Daniels – keyboards
- Sam Sims - bass
- Vernon Black – guitar
- Gregory "Gigi" Gonoway – drums
- Marquinho Brasil – percussion
- Melonie Daniels – background vocals
- Mary Ann Tatum – background vocals
- Tracy Harris - background vocals
- Lloyd Smith – background vocals
- Trey Lorenz – vocals, background vocals
