= Rainbow (Mariah Carey album) =

Studio album by Mariah Carey
- Released: October 27, 1999
- Recorded: April–September 1999
- Studios: Avatar (New York); Capri Digital (Capri); Cello (Los Angeles); Chartmaker (Malibu); Flyte Tyme (Edina); KrossWire (Atlanta); O'Henry (Los Angeles); Quad (New York); Record One (Los Angeles); Record Plant (Los Angeles); Right Track (New York)
- Genres: Pop; hip hop; R&B
- Length: 55:45
- Label: Columbia
- Producers: Mariah Carey; Jimmy Jam and Terry Lewis; James Wright; David Foster; Jermaine Dupri; Bryan-Michael Cox; Damizza; Kevin "She'kspere" Briggs; DJ Clue; Steve Mac

Mariah Carey chronology
#1's (1998)	Rainbow (1999)	Glitter (2001)

Singles from Rainbow
- 1. "Heartbreaker" Released: August 23, 1999; 2. "Thank God I Found You" Released: November 15, 1999; 3. "Can't Take That Away (Mariah's Theme)" Released: April 17, 2000; 4. "Crybaby" Released: April 17, 2000; 5. "Against All Odds (Take a Look at Me Now)" Released: May 29, 2000

Rainbow is the seventh studio album by American singer-songwriter Mariah Carey. It was released on October 27, 1999, by Columbia Records. The album followed Butterfly (1997), on which she adopted a new image and fully transitioned into the urban contemporary market. Rainbow contains hip-hop–influenced R&B tracks and a variety of ballads. Carey produced the album mainly with Jimmy Jam & Terry Lewis, who replaced Walter Afanasieff, the main balladeer Carey worked with throughout the 1990s. As a result of her divorce from Sony Music CEO Tommy Mottola, Carey had more control over the musical style of Rainbow; she collaborated with several hip-hop artists such as Jay-Z, Snoop Dogg, Master P and Mystikal as well as female rappers Da Brat and Missy Elliott. Other collaborations include Joe, Usher and boy band 98 Degrees.

Continuing to push the horizons of her musical repertoire, Carey featured Jay-Z on Rainbow's lead single, "Heartbreaker"—the first time in her career that another artist was featured on one of her lead singles. Carey wrote ballads that were closer to R&B than pop for this album, and worked with Snoop Dogg and Usher on "Crybaby" and "How Much", respectively, both of which featured strong R&B beats and grooves. Several of the ballads that Carey wrote during this period, including "Thank God I Found You" (written with Terry Lewis) and "After Tonight" (written with Diane Warren), mirrored sentiments she experienced in her personal life.

Rainbow received generally positive reviews from music critics, who generally praised Carey's embrace of R&B and hip hop in her musical style. The album debuted at number two on the US Billboard 200, with first-week sales of 323,000, becoming her first non-holiday studio album since Emotions (1991) not to reach number one. However, within a month, Rainbow was certified triple platinum by the Recording Industry Association of America (RIAA), denoting shipments of three million copies in the United States. Internationally, the album peaked at number one in France and Greece, and charted within the top-five positions in Australia, Austria, Belgium, the Netherlands, Germany, Japan and Switzerland. Globally, Rainbow has sold an estimated eight million copies.

Rainbow spawned five singles, two of which became number-one hits on the US Billboard Hot 100, making Rainbow her seventh-consecutive studio album to produce one or more number-one hits. The album's lead single, "Heartbreaker", became Carey's fourteenth number-one hit on the Billboard Hot 100 and topped the record charts in Canada and New Zealand. "Thank God I Found You", featuring Joe and 98 Degrees, also topped the Billboard Hot 100, but achieved moderate international chart success. The next two singles, "Can't Take That Away (Mariah's Theme)" and "Crybaby" featuring Snoop Dogg, were released as a double A-side. The songs were at the center of a public feud in between Carey and Sony Music due to the label's alleged weak promotion of the singles. Carey's cover of Phil Collins' "Against All Odds (Take a Look at Me Now)" with Westlife peaked at number one in Ireland and the United Kingdom.

== Background ==
Since her debut in 1990, Carey's career was heavily calculated and controlled by her husband and Sony Music CEO, Tommy Mottola. For years, Carey's albums had consisted of slow and meaningful ballads, devoid of any guest appearances or hip hop-influenced melodies. In January 1995, as she recorded Daydream, Carey began taking more control over her musical style and genre influences. She enlisted the production skills and rap styles of Ol' Dirty Bastard, who was featured on the remix of her song "Fantasy." While Mottola was hesitant at first, Carey's persistence paid off when the song became an international chart topper, with critics calling the collaboration one of the pioneering songs of pop and R&B musical collaborations.

During the recording and production of Carey's Butterfly in 1997, she and Mottola separated, giving Carey an extended amount of control over the unfinished album. Following their separation, Carey began working with younger hip hop and R&B producers and songwriters, aside from her usual work with balladeers Walter Afanasieff and Kenneth Edmonds. While the album incorporated several different genres and components that were not present in Carey's previous releases, Butterfly also included a balance of her classic ballads and newer R&B-infused jams. While Sony accepted Carey's new collaborations with writers and producers such as P. Diddy and Bone Thugs-n-Harmony, they continued to focus their promotion on the ballads. After "Honey," the debut single from Butterfly, was released in August 1997, Sony halted the release of the succeeding R&B-influenced jams, and released the ballad "My All" as the second worldwide single. Rainbow followed in its predecessors' footsteps, featuring even more hip hop and R&B.

== Writing and recording ==
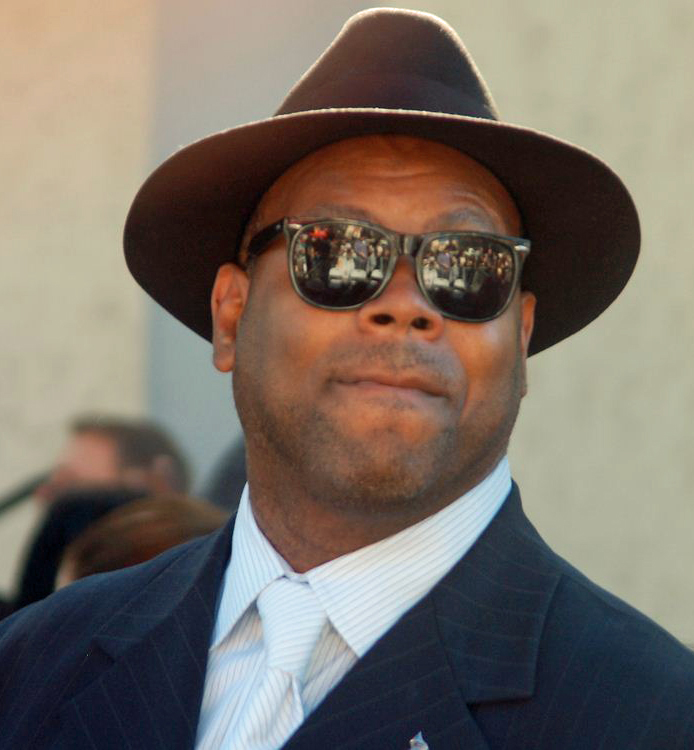
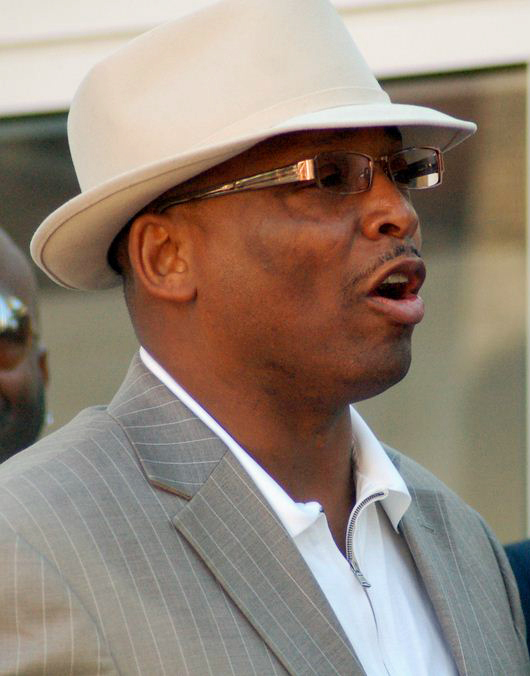
Jimmy Jam and Terry Lewis collaborated with Carey for the first time on the album, co-producing a total of six tracks.

During the spring of 1999, Carey began working on the final album of her record contract with Sony, her ex-husband's label. Carey's lover at the time, Luis Miguel, was in the midst of a European tour. In order to spend more time with him, she opted to record the album on the secluded island of Capri, Italy, figuring the seclusion would also help her complete the album sooner. During this time, Carey's strained relationship with Sony affected her work with writing partner Afanasieff, who had worked extensively with Carey throughout the first half of her career. Aside from their growing creative differences, Mottola had given Afanasieff more opportunities to work with other artists. She felt Mottola was trying to separate her from Afanasieff, in hopes of keeping their relationship permanently strained. Due to the pressure and the awkward relationship Carey had now developed with Sony, she completed the album in a period of three months in the summer of 1999, quicker than any of her other albums. In an interview with Blitz TV, Carey spoke of her decision to record the album in Capri:

I love New York. But if I'm there, I want to go out, friends come to the studio, the phone rings constantly. But in Capri, I am in a remote place, and there is no one I can run into. I felt that in Capri I would be able to effectively finish the album on a shorter schedule. And I did. I made it in three months, I was like 'Get me off this label!' I couldn't take it. The situation there [Sony] was becoming increasingly difficult.

Like her previous releases, Carey co-wrote and co-produced the album's material, working with several hip hop and R&B producers such as Jay-Z, Jimmy Jam and Terry Lewis, Usher, Snoop Dogg, Missy Elliott, Jermaine Dupri, and Bryan-Michael Cox. For the album's debut single release, Carey collaborated with Jay-Z and DJ Clue. During the spring of 1999, Carey began working with Clue on several hooks and melodies for the lead single. After a few hours, they decided to include a hip hop star on the track, which eventually led to Jay-Z. Carey's longtime friend and back-up vocalist Trey Lorenz, who was featured on her remake of the Jackson 5 song "I'll Be There," added "some soft male [back-up] vocals." Carey worked with Lewis and Jam on the ballad "Thank God I Found You." She had already been in the studio with the duo several times when she contacted them to meet her at the studio, where she told them that she had come up with the title, hook, and melody. Usually, when Carey was writing the songs for Rainbow, James "Big Jim" Wright would play the organ or piano and assist Carey to find the "right melody." However, since Wright was not present, Lewis played the organ while Carey directed him with her lower registers, providing the chord progression. They composed the song and recorded Carey's vocals. Knowing she wanted to introduce a male vocalist on the track, Lewis brought R&B singer Joe and pop group 98 Degrees into the studio. After a few hours, the group and Joe had recorded all their vocals and the song was complete. In an interview with Bronson, Lewis discussed the night Carey wrote "Thank God I Found You:"

It all happened that night. She told us the title of the song, the concept and sang us the melody. We usually have Big Jim Wright sit in on those kind of sessions to work out the chords. he wasn't there so I had to work on the chord myself. So I was playing and there was a part where I said 'Man, what chord am I supposed to do here?' and Mariah has such a good ear that she sang me the chord.

While the album was immersed further into mainstream R&B territory, Carey included some of her classic ballads and tender love songs on the album, working with writers and producers such as David Foster and Diane Warren. The idea to work with Warren was suggested by Foster, who thought that the two would be able to "hammer out one hell of a ballad" together. The two wrote and produced the song titled "After Tonight." Carey felt the song was a perfect metaphor for her relationship with Miguel, describing their romance in Capri. While the song was deemed a success by both parties, they described their working relationship with mixed feelings. According to Foster, who was involved in the writing session, Carey and Warren would not always agree on the lyrics and melodious structure of the song. He described it as a "give and take relationship"; Warren would offer lyrics and Carey would not like them; she wanted something more intricate and detailed. Carey would produce a hook or lyrics that Warren did not feel were a perfect fit. In the end, Foster felt that they worked "well together." After recording the song, Carey invited Miguel to record the song with her as a duet. However, after recording his verses several times, Foster and Carey realized that the song would not turn out the way they planned. Foster said the song's key was "too high for him"; the voices did not harmonize well. Carey did not have time to re-record her vocals in a lower key to accommodate Miguel's verses. Miguel, furious over the failed collaboration, later sent a cut-up tape of the demo to Foster. The incident was later dramatized in the third season of Luis Miguel: The Series (2021). Carey and Warren also wrote "Can't Take That Away (Mariah's Theme)," one of the other ballads featured on Rainbow.

== Music and lyrics ==
"It was from the standpoint of girls who keep going back to the same guy and they can't help themselves. They know they're going to get hurt. I've been one of those girls, so I know there's a lot of them out there."

— Carey, describing the lyrics of "Heartbreaker"

As with Butterfly, songs for Rainbow were chosen to solidify Carey's reputation as a multi-genre artist. Throughout the first phase of her career, Carey's albums predominantly consisted of pop and adult contemporary ballads. Rainbow mixed hip hop and R&B-flavored upbeat songs with softer and lyrically intense ballads resembling those that Carey had previously recorded. "Heartbreaker," Carey's first collaboration with Jay-Z, used a sample from "Attack of the Name Game," recorded by Stacy Lattisaw, as its hook. The loop originated from "The Name Game" by Shirley Ellis; Ellis and co-writer Lincoln Chase are credited as songwriters on the track. Carey incorporated the hook into the song's melody, and added instrumentation. Lyrically, the song chronicles the heartbreak the protagonist feels after learning of her lover's infidelity. "Thank God I Found You" features vocals from Joe and 98 Degrees, as well as songwriting and production from Carey and Lewis. According to Carey, the song reflects on events in her own life at the time, with the lyrics describing the completion the protagonist feels after "finding" their lover. Joe provides the main male vocal throughout each verse, and 98 Degrees sing the background vocals and the bridge.

Prior to the album's recording, Mariah and her sister Alison had a falling out in their relationship. Alison had tested positive for HIV sometime after she turned 27 in late-1988, and in late-1994, her second son Michael, who was then only 7 years old, was taken away from her by the sisters's mother, Patricia. She continued to blame Mariah for many of her problems and heartbreaks throughout the years. After releasing her self-titled debut album in 1990, which she dedicated to Alison, Mariah began paying for Alison's continuous visits to drug rehabilitation. On February 6, 1995, in an interview with Nancy Glass from the news show American Journal, Alison claimed that Mariah only dedicated the album to her to make herself look good, and that it was beneath contempt. Carey wrote a song in response titled "Petals", which she describes as the most honest lyrics she has ever written. The song tells of Carey's feelings for her sister, while illustrating the pain Alison's betrayal and suffering have caused. In an interview with Bronson, Carey described the meaning of the lyrics of "Petals":

It is a great outlet for me to go into the studio and write a song like 'Petals', which is one of my most personal songs and remains one of my favorites. I think [it had the most] honest lyrics I've ever written. The song chronicles a lot of past emotions I've felt to certain people close to me, and the way I feel towards them and how their actions have impacted me personally. For that reason, I sang in my lower registers, trying to add that breathy effect to go hand in hand with the song's composition.

"After Tonight" was a song Carey wrote with David Foster and Diane Warren. Carey had strong feelings about the song, as she wrote it about her relationship with Luis Miguel. The song was compared instrumentally to "My All" from Butterfly, which features traces of Latin and guitar instrumentation. In the lyrics, the protagonist asks her lover if he will still love her and come back to her "after tonight." Carey's cover of the Phil Collins song "Against All Odds (Take a Look at Me Now)" was originally intended to be a solo ballad. The song was re-done after the album was released, with music by the Irish band Westlife replacing the song's instrumental bridge. "Can't Take That Away (Mariah's Theme)" was one of the album's most uplifting ballads, lyrically serving as an anthem for fans and listeners. The message, Carey said, was a personal theme of hers growing up, of not letting others "bring her down" and not allowing them to take away the light inside her. "How Much" is a duet with Usher and features a sample from Tupac Shakur's "Me and My Girlfriend."

== Conflict with Sony ==
As with Butterfly two years earlier, Rainbow became the center of conflict between Carey and her label. After her divorce from Mottola, Carey's working relationship with the label deteriorated. She intended for "Can't Take That Away (Mariah's Theme)" to be the third single from Rainbow, as it held very personal lyrical content. However, Sony made it clear that they intended the third single should be a more upbeat and urban track. The difference in opinion led to a very public feud, as Carey began posting messages on her webpage in early and mid-2000, telling fans inside information on the dispute, as well as instructing them to request "Can't Take That Away (Mariah's Theme)" on radio stations. One of the messages Carey left on her page read:

Basically, a lot of you know the political situation in my professional career is not positive. It's been really, really hard. I don't even know if this message is going to get to you because I don't know if they want you to hear this. I'm getting a lot of negative feedback from certain corporate people. But I am not willing to give up.

Carey's actions were given mixed reception, with critics and executives commending her bold actions regarding a song she felt needed to be heard, while others criticized her for publicizing the dispute further. Soon after, Sony stripped Carey's webpage of messages and began negotiations. Fearing to lose their label's highest seller and the best-selling artist of the decade, Sony chose to release the song. Carey, initially content with the agreement, soon found out that the song had only been given a very limited and low-promotion release, which meant the song failed to chart on the official US chart, and made international charting extremely difficult and unlikely.

== Promotion ==
Prior to the album's release, Carey made an appearance on Pavarotti & Friends for Guatemala and Kosovo, performing "My All" and "Hero" alongside Luciano Pavarotti in a live duet. The concert benefit was filmed live in Modena, Italy, during the summer of 1999 and was released for sale on September 21, with funds being donated to relief efforts for natural disasters in Guatemala and Kosovo. Carey made several live television and award show appearances at this time, and recorded her own Fox Broadcasting Company special, titled The Mariah Carey Homecoming Special. A mini-concert filmed at Carey's old high school in Huntington, New York, the special aired on Fox on December 21, 1999. Carey performed "Heartbreaker" and its accompanying remix at the MTV European Music Awards, held on November 11, 1999, in Dublin, Ireland. Additionally, the song was performed on The Oprah Winfrey Show, the British music chart program Top of the Pops, and The Today Show, which included a performance of "Can't Take That Away (Mariah's Theme)" and "Hero." "Thank God I Found You was performed live at the 2000 American Music Awards as well as on several European programs, including Top of the Pops and Friday Night's All Wright in the United Kingdom, NRJ and Soulier d'Or in France, Wetten, dass..? in Germany, and Quelli che... il Calcio in Italy. The album's final two releases, "Can't Take That Away (Mariah's Theme)" and "Against All Odds (Take a Look at Me Now)," were performed on The View and at the 2000 Blockbuster Entertainment Awards. Carey further promoted Rainbow performing on VH1 Divas 2000: A Tribute to Diana Ross, where she opened the show with a mashup of "Heartbreaker" with Ross's "Love Hangover" and later performed "Can't Take That Away (Mariah's Theme)."

In order to promote Rainbow, Carey embarked on her fourth headlining and third worldwide tour. Titled the Rainbow World Tour, it included nineteen shows: six in Europe, four in Asia, eight in the United States, and one in Canada. For Carey's previous two tours, she had only visited Europe and Asia, due to the mixed reception of her debut stateside tour in 1993. However, after achieving record-breaking ticket sales throughout Asia and instant sellouts in Europe, Carey felt secure enough to once again tour her native country. The set list featured songs from most of Carey's previous studio albums, as well as some tracks from Rainbow. Missy Elliott and Da Brat served as opening acts for the US leg of the tour. Ticket sales were very strong; the entire US leg sold out in a matter of days. The Asian and European leg mirrored the commercial success of her previous two tours. Reviews for the tour varied from positive to mixed. Some critics and fans reproached her of having a "tired and hoarse voice," while others commented on Carey's choice of wardrobe. Several critics and many concert-goers praised the tour, calling it an intense celebration of Carey's career.

=== Singles ===
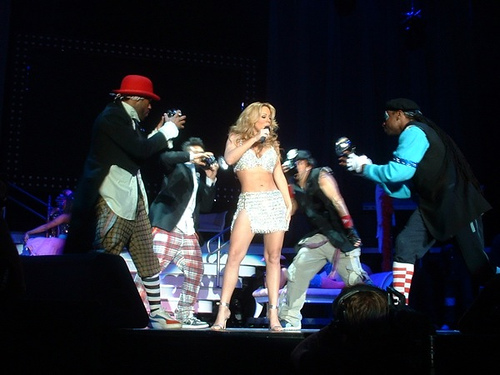
Carey performing the lead single "Heartbreaker" live on her Charmbracelet World Tour in 2003.

Five singles were released from Rainbow; two were worldwide international releases and three were more limited releases. "Heartbreaker," the album's first worldwide release, became Carey's fourteenth chart topper in the United States. Aside from staying atop the US chart for two weeks, the song reached the chart's summit in Canada and New Zealand. Elsewhere, "Heartbreaker" achieved high charting, peaking within the top five in France and the United Kingdom and within the top ten in Australia, Belgium, the Netherlands, Germany, and Switzerland. The song received mixed reviews from critics. Arion Berger from Rolling Stone called the song Carey's "most insinuating: nasal, silken, declarative, riding the percolating beat." However, while dismissing some of the song's vocals and the incorporation of the hook, he complimented its marriage of pop and hip hop through Jay-Z's verses. The song's music video became one of the most expensive music videos of all time, costing an estimated $2.5 million. The video features Carey visiting a movie theater with her friends, where she finds her lover with another woman. "Thank God I Found You" was released as the second worldwide single from the album. While becoming Carey's fifteenth chart topper in the US, the song achieved moderate chart success in Europe and other territories. Berger called it a "gospel soar" and complimented Carey's vocals, as well as the harmonies by 98 Degrees. The music video features footage from a live concert with Carey and the band performing the song.

"Crybaby" and "Can't Take That Away (Mariah's Theme)" were released simultaneously as a double A-side, with very limited promotion from Sony. These two songs, especially the latter, became the center of a very public controversy between Carey and her label, due to their alleged low promotion of the album. Carey and Snoop Dogg were featured in the music video for "Crybaby," with Carey playing an anxious woman who can't sleep at night due to her lover's infidelity. A music video for "Can't Take That Away" was released around the same time, which features Carey on a rooftop garden. Carey sings during a rain storm, and towards the video's conclusion, the sun arises, bring forth a "new day." The final single from Rainbow, "Against All Odds (Take a Look at Me Now)," was given a limited release as well. After performing moderately around the world, a new version of the song, featuring Westlife, was released in Europe and Australia. It reached number three on the European Hot 100 Singles chart and became Carey's second UK number-one single. The song's video features Carey and Westlife on a boat in Capri. Scenes of the group exploring the island are cut with scenes of them in the studio, though Carey never re-recorded her vocals from the original version.

=== 25th anniversary ===
On June 14, 2024, for the album's twenty-fifth anniversary, Carey released an expanded version of the album featuring a remaster of the original album and an extended version of the interlude "Rainbow" retitled "Rainbow's End" with David Morales. The new version also contained a solo version of "Thank God I Found You", live recordings, a cappella versions of songs such as "Bliss", various remixes and a previously unreleased song, "There For Me". A 2-LP rainbow picture disc set was also announced.

On revisiting the album, Carey noted that "listening to the record again brought [her] back to that time in a way that was extremely overwhelming". She described the album as a "brighter and more playful era" compared to Butterfly (1997) and added that she "did re-record some of the vocals" for "Rainbow's End".

== Critical reception ==
Professional ratings
Review scores
Source	Rating
AllMusic	3/5 stars
The Baltimore Sun	3.5/5 stars
Christgau's Consumer Guide	(2-star Honorable Mention)
Entertainment Weekly	B+
Los Angeles Times	3.5/4 stars
MTV Asia	7/10
Rolling Stone	3/5 stars
USA Today	3/4 stars
Under the Radar	6.5/10
The Harvard Crimson	D

Rainbow received mixed to positive reviews from critics, many of whom noted the new direction in Carey's music. In Entertainment Weekly, Danyel Smith wrote that "what began on Butterfly as a departure ends up on Rainbow a progression – perhaps the first compelling proof of Carey's true colors as an artist." Arion Berger from Rolling Stone viewed it as a genuine R&B and hip hop album, a "sterling chronicle of the state of accessible hip-hop balladeering at the close of 1999." Aside from calling some of the ballads "banal," Berger concluded his review that "Rainbow is at its best—and Carey at her most comfortable—when urbane hip-hop stylings and faux R&B coexist in smooth middle-of-the-road harmony." Elysa Gardner from the Los Angeles Times wrote in her review: "Exhibiting an emotional authority to match her technical prowess, Carey gives us a vision of love that's dynamic without being ostentatious." Steve Jones from USA Today deemed the record "colorful" and "some of her most compelling work." Village Voice critic Robert Christgau gave the album a two-star honorable mention, indicating a "likable effort consumers attuned to its overriding aesthetic or individual vision may well enjoy." He cited "Heartbreaker" and "Crybaby" as highlights while writing that Carey was "not a 'real' r&b thrush, but good enough to fake it."

Amy Linden from Vibe was less impressed by the album, particularly the songs on which Carey sings over hip hop samples or alongside guest rappers, deeming it a commonplace formula--"pairing a singing thrush with a rhyming thug." Stephen Thomas Erlewine from AllMusic said it was "the first Carey album where she's written personal lyrics, and allusions to her separation from Mottola." He called the lyrics "true" and "deep," but found the songs "ballad-heavy" and "repetitious," adding that the album followed the formula of Carey's previous records too precisely. In his opinion, "it would have been a more effective album if the heartbreak, sorrow, and joy that bubbles underneath the music were brought to the surface."

== Commercial performance ==
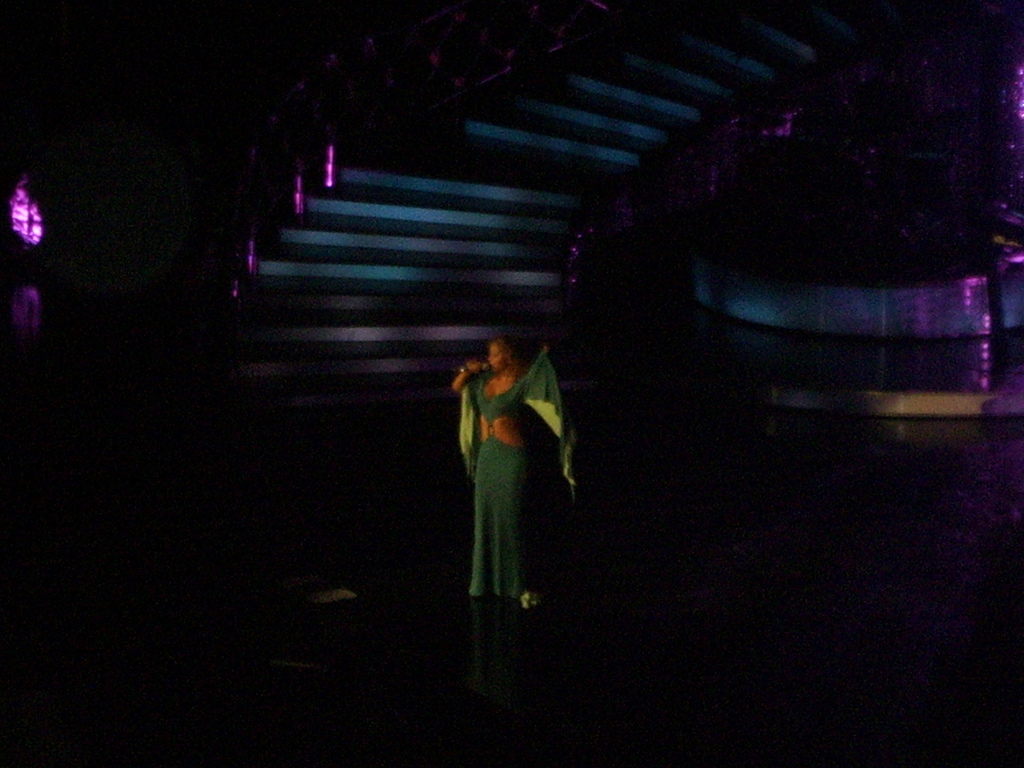
Carey performing the single "Thank God I Found You" during her Adventures of Mimi Tour in 2006.

Rainbow debuted at number two on the Billboard 200 chart with 323,000 units sold, the highest first-week sales of Carey's career at that time. In its first week, it was barred from the top by Rage Against the Machine's The Battle of Los Angeles. In its second week, the album stayed at number two, selling an additional 228,000 copies, barred from the top by Faith Hill's Breathe. In its eighth week, Rainbow experienced its highest weekly sales—during the Christmas week of 1999—selling 369,000 copies, while placing at number nine. It became Carey's first studio album since Merry Christmas (1994) to not reach the top position in the United States. In total, Rainbow stayed in the top twenty for ten weeks and on the chart for thirty-five, making one re-entry. It was certified triple-Platinum by the Recording Industry Association of America (RIAA), denoting shipments of three million copies throughout the United States. According to Nielsen SoundScan, the album's sales in the US are estimated at 3 million copies. In Canada, Rainbow debuted at number two on the Canadian Albums Chart, and was certified double-Platinum by the Canadian Recording Industry Association (CRIA). Sales in Canada are estimated at 300,000 units.

Rainbow debuted at number three on the Australian Albums Chart, staying within the chart for seven weeks. The album was certified Gold by the Australian Recording Industry Association (ARIA), denoting shipments of 35,000 copies. In France, the album experienced strong success, debuting at number four on the albums chart, rising to number one the following week, and remaining inside the top forty for thirty-four weeks. The album was certified Platinum by the Syndicat National de l'Édition Phonographique (SNEP), for sales of over 300,000 copies. In Germany, Rainbow peaked at number three, and received a Platinum certification from the Bundesverband Musikindustrie (BVMI), denoting shipments of 300,000 units. In the United Kingdom, Rainbow debuted at number eight with sales of 26,000 copies. It stayed within the top 100 for 20 weeks. Rainbow was certified Gold by the British Phonographic Industry (BPI), denoting shipments of 100,000 units. Additionally, Rainbow received Platinum certification in Brazil, with 250,000 copies, Platinum in New Zealand, Platinum in Spain, Gold in Argentina, Gold in Belgium, Gold in the Netherlands, and Gold in Switzerland. The album has sold an estimated eight million copies worldwide.

== Track listing ==
Rainbow
No.	Title	Writer(s)	Producer(s)	Length
1.	"Heartbreaker" (featuring Jay-Z)	Mariah Carey; Shawn Carter; Shirley Elliston; Lincoln Chase; Narada Michael Walden; Jeffrey Cohen	Carey; DJ Clue; Ken Ifill	4:46
2.	"Can't Take That Away (Mariah's Theme)"	Carey; Diane Warren	Carey; Jimmy Jam; Terry Lewis	4:33
3.	"Bliss"	Carey; James Harris III; Lewis; James Wright	Carey; Jam; Lewis; Wright^{[a]}	5:44
4.	"How Much" (featuring Usher)	Carey; Bryan-Michael Cox; Jermaine Dupri; Tupac Shakur; Darryl Harper; Tyrone Wrice; Ricky Rouse	Carey; Dupri; Cox^{[a]}	3:31
5.	"After Tonight"	Carey; Diane Warren; David Foster	Carey; Foster	4:16
6.	"X-Girlfriend"	Carey; Kandi; Kevin Briggs	Carey; Briggs	3:58
7.	"Heartbreaker" (Remix) (featuring Da Brat, Missy "Misdemeanor" Elliott, and DJ Clue)	Carey; Da Brat; Missy "Misdemeanor" Elliott; Ricardo Brown; Snoop Dogg; Warren Griffin III; Andre Young; Nathaniel Hale	Carey; DJ Clue; Ifill	4:32
8.	"Vulnerability" (Interlude)	Carey		1:12
9.	"Against All Odds (Take a Look at Me Now)"	Phil Collins	Carey; Jam; Lewis	3:25
10.	"Crybaby" (featuring Snoop Dogg)	Carey; Howie Hersh; Dogg; Trey Lorenz; Timothy Gatlin; Gene Griffin; Aaron Hall III; Teddy Riley	Carey; Damizza	5:20
11.	"Did I Do That?"	Carey; Craig Bazile; Tracey Waples; Joseph Smokey Johnson; Wardell Joseph Quezergue	Carey; Bazile; Master P	4:16
12.	"Petals"	Carey; Harris; Lewis; Wright	Carey; Jam; Lewis	4:23
13.	"Rainbow" (Interlude)	Carey; Harris; Lewis	Carey; Jam; Lewis	1:32
14.	"Thank God I Found You" (featuring Joe and 98°)	Carey; Harris; Lewis	Carey; Jam; Lewis	4:17
Total length:				55:45

French edition
No.	Title	Writer(s)	Producer(s)	Length
15.	"Theme from Mahogany (Do You Know Where You're Going To)"	Michael Masser; Gerald Goffin	Carey; Stevie Jordan; Mike Mason	3:47
Total length:				59:32

25th anniversary expanded edition
No.	Title	Writer(s)	Producer(s)	Length
15.	"Rainbow's End"	Carey; David Morales; Harris; Wright; Lewis	Carey; Morales	3:40
16.	"How Much" (So So Def Remix) (featuring Usher)	Carey; Cox; Dupri; Shakur; Harper; Wrice; Rouse	Carey; Dupri	3:28
17.	"Thank God I Found You" (Make It Last Remix) (featuring Joe and Nas)	Carey; Harris; Lewis; Riley; Keith Sweat	DJ Clue; Duro	5:08
18.	"Against All Odds (Take a Look at Me Now)" (featuring Westlife)	Collins	Carey; Steve Mac	3:20
19.	"There for Me"	Carey; Foster; Warren	Carey; Foster	4:14
20.	"Thank God I Found You" (solo version)	Carey; Harris; Lewis	Carey; Lewis; Jam	4:16
21.	"Love Hangover"/"Heartbreaker" (Live at VH1 Divas 2000)	Carey; Cohen; Chase; Carter; Ellis; Walden; Pam Sawyer; Marilyn McLeod		5:14
22.	"Can't Take That Away (Mariah's Theme)" (Live at VH1 Divas 2000)	Carey; Warren		4:35
23.	"Bliss" (Acapella)	Carey; Harris; Lewis	Carey; Lewis; Jam	5:27
24.	"There for Me" (Acapella)	Carey; Foster; Warren	Carey; Foster	3:49
25.	"Heartbreaker"/"If You Should Ever Be Lonely" (Junior's Heartbreaker Club Mix)	Carey; Val Young; Frederick Jenkins	Carey; Junior Vasquez	10:17
26.	"Can't Take That Away (Mariah's Theme)" (Morales Revival Triumphant Mix)	Carey; Morales; Warren	Morales	10:25
27.	"Against All Odds (Take a Look at Me Now)" (Pound Boys Main Mix)	Collins	Carey; Lewis; Jam	8:55
28.	"Rainbow's End" (extended mix)	Carey; Morales; Harris; Wright; Lewis	Carey; Morales	6:19
Total length:				134:52

=== Notes ===
- ^{^[a]} signifies a co-producer
- Track 18 originally appeared on Asian and UK reissue pressings.
- 25th anniversary edition vinyl pressings include tracks 15–18, 21, and 22.

Sample credits

- "Heartbreaker" contains a sample of Stacy Lattisaw's "Attack of the Name Game".
- "How Much" contains a sample of Makaveli's "Me and My Girlfriend".
- "Heartbreaker (Remix)" contains a sample of Snoop Dogg's "Ain't No Fun (If the Homies Can't Have None)".
- "Crybaby" contains samples of Guy's "Piece of My Love" and Toto's "Georgy Porgy".
- "Did I Do That?" contains a sample of Silkk the Shocker's "It Ain't My Fault 2".

== Personnel ==
Credits are adapted from the liner notes of Rainbow.

Personnel

- Mariah Carey – lead vocals, songwriting, background vocals
- David Foster – keyboard, songwriting
- Diane Warren – songwriting
- Narada Michael Walden – Drums, programming
- Bryan-Michael Cox – bass, keyboards
- Jermaine Dupri – programming, percussion
- James "Big Jim" Wright – keyboard, bass
- Corrado Sgandurra – guitar
- Terry Lewis – synthesizers, keyboards, rhythm programming
- James Harris III – synthesizers
- Trey Lorenz – backing vocals
- Cindy Mizelle – backing vocals
- Melonie Daniels – backing vocals
- Kelly Price – backing vocals
- Shanrae Price – backing vocals

Production

- Mariah Carey – arranger, producer
- David Foster – arranger, producer
- Diane Warren – arranger
- Jermaine Dupri – arranger, producer
- Narada Michael Walden – producer
- Terry Lewis – arranger, producer
- James Harris – producer
- Bryan-Michael Cox – producer
- Melissa Elliott – producer
- Calvin Broadus – producer
- Shawn Carter – producer
- DJ Clue – arranger, producer

== Charts ==
=== Weekly charts ===
1999–2000 weekly chart performance
Chart	Peak position
Australian Albums (ARIA)	4
Austrian Albums (Ö3 Austria)	4
Belgian Albums (Ultratop Flanders)	14
Belgian Albums (Ultratop Wallonia)	5
Brazilian Albums (NOPEM)	1
Canadian Albums (Billboard)	2
Canadian R&B Albums (Nielsen SoundScan)	1
Danish Albums (Hitlisten)	27
Dutch Albums (Album Top 100)	4
European Top 100 Albums (Music & Media)	1
Finnish Albums (Suomen virallinen lista)	32
French Albums (SNEP)	1
German Albums (Offizielle Top 100)	3
Greek Albums (IFPI)	1
Hungarian Albums (MAHASZ)	34
Icelandic Albums (Tónlist)	29
Irish Albums (IRMA)	65
Italian Albums (FIMI)	10
Japanese Albums (Oricon)	2
Malaysian Albums (RIM)	3
New Zealand Albums (RMNZ)	11
Norwegian Albums (VG-lista)	11
Scottish Albums (Official Charts)	55
Singapore Albums (SPVA)	3
Spanish Albums (PROMUSICAE)	7
Swedish Albums (Sverigetopplistan)	15
Swiss Albums (Schweizer Hitparade)	2
UK Albums (Official Charts)	8
UK R&B Albums (Official Charts)	2
US Billboard 200	2
US Top R&B/Hip-Hop Albums (Billboard)	2

2024 weekly chart performance
Chart	Peak position
Spanish Vinyl Albums (PROMUSICAE)	26
UK Album Downloads (Official Charts)	79
UK R&B Albums (Official Charts)	10
US Vinyl Albums (Billboard)	21

=== Monthly charts ===
2000 monthly chart performance
Chart	Peak position
South Korean International Albums (RIAK)	19

=== Year-end charts ===
1999 year-end chart performance
Chart	Position
Australian Albums (ARIA)	71
Belgian Albums (Ultratop Flanders)	85
Belgian Albums (Ultratop Wallonia)	48
Canada Top Albums/CDs (RPM)	58
Dutch Albums (MegaCharts)	97
European Top 100 Albums (Music & Media)	55
French Albums (SNEP)	25
German Albums (Offizielle Top 100)	90
Japanese Albums (Oricon)	62
UK Albums (OCC)	86
US Billboard 200	157

2000 year-end chart performance
Chart	Position
Belgian Albums (Ultratop Flanders)	89
Belgian Albums (Ultratop Wallonia)	51
French Albums (SNEP)	67
Swiss Albums (Schweizer Hitparade)	98
US Billboard 200	31
US Top R&B/Hip-Hop Albums (Billboard)	48

== Certifications ==
Certifications and sales
Region	Certification	Certified units/sales
Argentina (CAPIF)	Gold	30,000^{^}
Australia (ARIA)	Gold	35,000^{^}
Belgium (BRMA)	Gold	25,000^{*}
Brazil (Pro-Música Brasil)	Platinum	300,000
Canada (Music Canada)	2× Platinum	300,000
France (SNEP)	Platinum	300,000^{*}
Germany (BVMI)	Platinum	300,000^{^}
Hong Kong (IFPI Hong Kong)	Platinum	20,000^{*}
Japan (RIAJ)	4× Platinum	800,000^{^}
Netherlands (NVPI)	Gold	50,000^{^}
New Zealand (RMNZ)	Platinum	15,000^{^}
South Korea	—	87,159
Spain (Promusicae)	Platinum	100,000^{^}
Switzerland (IFPI Switzerland)	Gold	25,000^{^}
United Kingdom (BPI)	Gold	210,000
United States (RIAA)	3× Platinum	3,443,000
Summaries
Europe (IFPI)	Platinum	1,000,000^{*}
Worldwide	—	8,000,000
^{*} Sales figures based on certification alone.^{^} Shipments figures based on certification alone.

== Release history ==
Release dates and formats
Region	Date	Edition(s)	Format(s)	Label(s)	Ref.
France	October 27, 1999	Standard	CD	Columbia	
Japan	October 27, 1999	Standard	CD; MiniDisc	Sony Japan	
Australia	October 29, 1999	Standard	CD	Sony	
Germany	November 1, 1999	Standard	CD	Sony	
United Kingdom	November 1, 1999	Standard	Cassette; CD; MiniDisc; vinyl	Columbia	
Canada	November 2, 1999	Standard	CD	Sony	
United States	November 2, 1999	Standard	Cassette; CD; MiniDisc; vinyl	Columbia	
Argentina	November 4, 1999	Standard	CD	Sony	
United Kingdom	September 25, 2000	Reissue	CD	Columbia	
Various	June 14, 2024	25th anniversary	Digital download; streaming	Columbia	
Various	October 18, 2024	25th anniversary	Vinyl	Columbia; Legacy	
Japan	October 30, 2024	25th anniversary	Vinyl	Sony Japan	

== See also ==
- List of best-selling albums in Brazil
