= Crybaby (Mariah Carey song) =

2000 single by Mariah Carey

Single by Mariah Carey featuring Snoop Dogg

from the album Rainbow
- A-side: "Can't Take That Away (Mariah's Theme)"
- Released: April 17, 2000
- Recorded: June 1999
- Studio: Capri Digital Studios (Capri, Italy); Right Track Recording (New York City)
- Genre: R&B
- Length: 5:19 (album version); 4:31 (radio edit)
- Label: Columbia
- Songwriters: Mariah Carey; Cordozar Calvin Broadus Jr.; Teddy Riley; Aaron Hall; Timmy Gatling; Gene Griffin
- Producers: Mariah Carey; Damizza

Mariah Carey singles chronology
"Can't Take That Away (Mariah's Theme)" (2000)	"Crybaby" (2000)	"Against All Odds (Take a Look at Me Now)" (2000)

Snoop Dogg singles chronology
"Chin Check" (2000)	"Crybaby" (2000)	"Story to Tell" (2000)

Music video
- "Crybaby" on YouTube

"Crybaby" is a song by American singer-songwriter Mariah Carey featuring American rapper Snoop Dogg. It was released on April 17, 2000 by Columbia Records as a double A-side with "Can't Take That Away (Mariah's Theme)". It was written by Carey and Snoop Dogg, and produced by the former and Damizza for Carey's seventh studio album, Rainbow (1999). It serves as the album's fourth single. It features Snoop Dogg throughout the song's bridge and is built around a sample of the 1988 song "Piece of My Love," originally performed by Guy and written by Teddy Riley, Aaron Hall, Timmy Gatling and Gene Griffin. Throughout the song, the protagonist reveals the struggles of dealing with insomnia and thoughts of a past relationship during the night, as she spirals out of control and declares "I gotta get me some sleep."

The song was the center of a very public controversy between Carey and her label Sony Music Entertainment, due to their lack of promotion of it as a commercial single. It, alongside its A-side "Can't Take That Away (Mariah's Theme)" were not eligible to chart on the Billboard Hot 100, due to the chart's rules at the time of their release. Eventually, the song was able to attain a peak of twenty-eight, becoming Carey's first single to miss the top twenty. The song's music video features Carey spending a restless night in her apartment, throwing wine and cereal while trying to "get some sleep." Snoop Dogg makes an appearance in the video through a television monitor. Carey performed the song live during her Rainbow World Tour, in support of the album and its singles.

== Background and composition ==
"Crybaby" (2000)
A 30-second sample of the song, featuring the chorus and Carey singing of her insomnia.

"Crybaby" was recorded during the summer of 1999 in Capri, Italy. The song is composed in common time in the key of D minor and features instrumentation from the guitar and piano. The song moves at a tempo of 79 beats per minute. Carey's vocal range throughout the song ranges from the low note of B_{2} to the high note of F_{5}. "Crybaby" features a rap verse from Snoop Dogg, and incorporates heavy usage of background vocals. The song's lyrics find the protagonist struggling with insomnia due to thoughts of a past lover throughout the night, not allowing her to sleep. According to Carey, the song also has a more personal message, relating to the difficulty of getting rest with such a work-filled schedule. She claimed that through writing, recording, and producing her music, as well as all the promotional appearances, it became increasingly difficult for her to unwind and sleep at night. At one point in the song, Carey sings "I gotta get me some sleep," before finishing the final chorus.

== Reception ==
=== Critical reception ===
Critical reviews for "Crybaby" were positive. Danyel Smith from Entertainment Weekly called the song "sexy" and wrote "[Snoop Dogg]'s words tumble like dice across her velvety vocals." Editor from Rolling Stone, Arion Berger, also complimented "Crybaby," especially the way Snoop Dogg's verses blended with Carey's vocals. Berger called his rap verses "fittingly careless." Robert Christgau, an editor from The Village Voice, commented that the song was "not real R&B thrush," but wrote "its good enough to fake it." While reviewing Rainbow, Dara Cook from MTV wrote that "Mariah amazes," on the song also calling the collaboration "Snoop Dogg enhanced." Cook wrote further "Perhaps culled from remnant Derek Jeter-directed rage, a frenzied and fed-up Mariah aggravates herself into a soulful, improvisational tizzy."

=== Commercial performance ===
"Crybaby" was released as the third single from Rainbow in 2000, as a double A-side with "Can't Take That Away (Mariah's Theme)". "Can't Take That Away" was emphasized at Top 40 Mainstream radio stations and "Crybaby" at mainstream urban stations. It was intended that the former would chart on the US Billboard Hot 100 and the latter would focus on the R&B charts. The songs had very limited airplay, and because Billboard magazine rules at that time stipulated that the song from a double A-side with the most airplay (in this case, "Crybaby") would be credited only, "Crybaby" was eligible to chart. Double A-sided singles were credited together on the charts until 1998, when the Hot 100 changed from a "singles" chart to a "songs" chart, and consequently every song was credited individually. "Crybaby" did not appear on the Billboard Hot 100 Airplay chart. It debuted on the Hot 100 at number 28 following its release as a commercial single, but its minimal airplay prevented it from climbing higher. It remained in the top forty for two weeks and on the chart for seven weeks, becoming Carey's first single to miss the US top twenty.

== Music video ==
The song's music video was directed by Sanaa Hamri, who also directed the video for "Can't Take That Away (Mariah's Theme)." Both videos were shot back to back, and were released simultaneously to music programs and channels for immediate circulation. The video begins with Carey lying in her bed, as she receives a text message from Snoop Dogg reading "Yo what's happening? What you crying for? Now you know you look 2 damn good 2 be crying... Come here... Holla at a playa DPG style... Ya know," to which Carey responds "I can't sleep." As the video progresses as the lyrics continue, it appears to be 5 AM, and Carey is still unable to sleep. She lies in bed with the lamp on, pondering on thoughts of a past lover until she takes a bath. Afterwards, she makes her way to the kitchen, and begins pouring an abundant amount of cereal and milk into a bowl, spilling it over the counter in a restless rage. As the scene finishes, Snoop's face is seen on a small monitor, directing his verse to Carey in the video. As the last chorus plays, Carey becomes restless and tosses a champagne glass and bottle at a large window, shattering it and sending glass around the living room. The video ends with Carey lying down on the couch one more, attempting to sleep once more.

== Live performances ==
Carey performed "Crybaby" live on the 2000 Rainbow World Tour. For the song's performances, the stage was set with a large bed, while Carey sang it dressed in pajamas and Dogg appeared rapping through the video screen. The song was also performed on select nights of The Elusive Chanteuse Show tour in 2014. The most recent performance of the song however, was on Carey Vegas residency, The Butterfly Returns.

== Track listing and formats ==
- US CD Single
1. "Crybaby" (Radio Edit) – 4:31
2. "Crybaby" (Album Version) – 5:19

== Credits and personnel ==
Credits adapted from the Rainbow liner notes.

- Mariah Carey – songwriting, co-producer, vocals
- Snoop Dogg – songwriting, vocals
- Damizza – co-production
- Teddy Riley – songwriting
- Aaron Hall – songwriting
- Timmy Gatling – songwriting
- Gene Griffin – songwriting
- Nicki Richards – backing vocals
- Ronnie King – Moog
- Michael Scheshingen – mixer
- Ashburn Bernie Miller – engineer
- Brian Nolen – MIDI editor
- Jeff Burns – assistant engineer
- Pete Karem – assistant engineer
- Bod Ludwig – mastering

== Charts ==
Weekly chart performance for "Crybaby"
Chart (2000)	Peak position
Canada (Nielsen SoundScan)	4
Netherlands (Single Top 100) with "Against All Odds"	20
Netherlands (Dutch Top 40) with "Against All Odds"	27
UK Club (Music Week) with "Can't Take That Away (Mariah's Theme)"	40
UK Urban Club (Music Week) with "Can't Take That Away (Mariah's Theme)"	19
US Billboard Hot 100	28
US Crossover (Billboard)	39
US Hot R&B/Hip-Hop Songs (Billboard)	23
US CHR/Rhythmic (Radio & Records)	40
US Urban (Radio & Records)	31

== Release history ==
Release dates and formats for "Crybaby"
Region	Date	Format(s)	Label(s)	Ref.
Canada	April 17, 2000	CD maxi single (with "Can't Take That Away (Mariah's Theme)")	Columbia	
United States	April 18, 2000	Rhythmic contemporary radio	Columbia	
United States	June 6, 2000	7-inch vinyl; 12-inch vinyl; cassette single; CD single; CD maxi single (with "Can't Take That Away (Mariah's Theme)")	Columbia	
