= Heartbreaker (Mariah Carey song) =

1999 single by Mariah Carey

Single by Mariah Carey featuring Jay-Z

from the album Rainbow
- B-side: "If You Should Ever Be Lonely"
- Released: August 23, 1999
- Recorded: 1999
- Studio: Capri Digital Studios (Capri, Italy); O'Henry Sound Studios (Burbank, California); Quad Recording (New York City); Record One (Sherman Oaks, California); Right Track Recording (New York City); The Record Plant (Los Angeles, California)
- Genre: Pop; hip-hop; R&B
- Length: 4:47
- Label: Columbia
- Composers: Mariah Carey; Shawn Carter; Shirley Elliston; Lincoln Chase; Narada Michael Walden; Jeffrey Cohen
- Lyricists: Mariah Carey; Shawn Carter
- Producers: Mariah Carey; DJ Clue; Ken "Duro" Ifill

Mariah Carey singles chronology
"I Still Believe" (1999)	"Heartbreaker" (1999)	"Thank God I Found You" (1999)

Jay-Z singles chronology
"Girl's Best Friend" (1999)	"Heartbreaker" (1999)	"What You Think of That" (1999)

Music videos
- "Heartbreaker" on YouTube; "Heartbreaker" (Jay-Z version) on YouTube; "Heartbreaker" (remix) on YouTube

"Heartbreaker" is a song by American singer-songwriter Mariah Carey featuring American rapper Jay-Z for her seventh studio album Rainbow (1999). It was released on August 23, 1999, by Columbia Records as the lead single from Rainbow. The song was written by the artists and produced by Carey and DJ Clue, with additional writers being credited for the hook being built around a sample from "Attack of the Name Game" by Stacy Lattisaw. "Heartbreaker" pushed Carey even further into the R&B and hip hop market, becoming her second commercial single to feature a rapper. Lyrically, the song describes lovesickness towards an unfaithful partner.

"Heartbreaker" received mixed reviews from music critics, many of whom felt it was not original or innovative in terms of a creative step forward. Additionally, it was compared heavily to Carey's 1995 hit single "Fantasy", which also built its hook from a sampled beat. "Heartbreaker" topped the Canadian Singles Chart and the US Billboard Hot 100, becoming Carey's 14th US chart-topper. The single topped the New Zealand Singles Chart and was a top-five single in Croatia, France, Poland, Spain, and the United Kingdom.

Carey performed "Heartbreaker" live on several international television and award shows, as well as on her concert tours. The accompanying music video for "Heartbreaker", directed by Brett Ratner, is one of the most expensive ever made, costing over US$2.5 million. The video features Carey and her friends visiting a film theater and catching her boyfriend (played by Jerry O'Connell) on a date with another woman. Carey played herself and a brunette villainess named Bianca Storm, during a physical altercation scene between the two women. Due to contractual agreements at the time of its filming, Jay-Z was unable to make an appearance in the original music video, though he would appear in a recut version soon after. The video was inspired by several other films, including Grease, Scarface and Enter the Dragon.

== Background ==
With her sixth studio effort, Butterfly (1997), Carey started infusing hip hop elements in her songs, working with different, and younger, producers and songwriters. After the album's success and the release of her first compilation album #1's (1998), Carey began to work on her seventh album, Rainbow (1999). Her main focus on the album was to continue on the same path she began with on Butterfly, producing a subtle combination between inspirational ballads and hip hop beats. "Heartbreaker" marked the first time in Carey's career that a rapper was included on a lead single, following Ol' Dirty Bastard, who was featured on the Bad Boy remix of "Fantasy" in 1995. While recording the album in Capri, Italy, Carey claimed to have spent most of the time developing what she felt to be a strong lead single.

Originally, "Heartbreaker" was intended to be part of Carey's debut film soundtrack, Glitter, however, after the film's delay, it was included on her album Rainbow. Prior to the song's radio release, Carey spoke of it in an interview: "It's pretty much [in] the classic style of my up-tempo classics like 'Fantasy' or 'Dreamlover,' [...] But it's kind of fun and has a new edge to it, I think, and definitely having Jay-Z takes it to a whole 'nother level. And [DJ] Clue makes it really fun and stuff."

== Recording and lyrics ==
While developing Rainbow, Carey had different ideas for the lead single. After writing the song's core lyrics and producing the main idea and melody, DJ Clue, one of the earlier producers in the project, suggested to Carey the use and incorporation of the hook from "Attack of the Name Game" by Stacy Lattisaw. After agreeing to it, they incorporated Carey's lyrics and melody to the hook, and began recording the song. However, after completing "Heartbreaker", Carey felt it needed a strong male verse, hoping for a rising hip hop artist. She chose to work with Jay-Z and began re-arranging the song as he wrote out his verse. Jay-Z wrote his entire verse and helped produce some of the song's core instrumentals. In an interview with Fred Bronson, Carey spoke of her experience working with Jay-Z:

"It's fun when you can find someone that you can relate to and that you respect. Jay-Z is someone I admire as a writer and as an artist. We could be sitting in the studio, and he can freestyle a rhyme that would be incredible just off the top of his head. He doesn't need a pen and paper. I equate that to a singer who can pick up the mike and riff and ad-lib over a song and take you to a totally new place."

Aside from her work with Clue and Jay-Z, Carey's longtime friend and background singer Trey Lorenz also took part in the song's production. He provided the back-up vocals in the song, and took part in several small areas of the development of Rainbow. When interviewed by Bronson, Carey spoke highly of Lorenz, "He's an amazing writer and singer, he's so influenced by the old school stuff, yet he's so current. He's known me since before my first album, and he's a great, loyal friend." Aside from the use of the sample and Jay-Z's verses, "Heartbreaker" contains strong female-empowering lyrics, which Carey wrote as a sort of anthem, especially because she felt that she personally has been in a similar predicament in the past.

== Composition ==
"Heartbreaker"
A 28-second sample of the song, featuring Carey singing the chorus over the soft background.

"Heartbreaker" is a moderately slow, mid-tempo pop, hip hop/R&B track. According to the music sheet published at Musicnotes.com, the song is written in the key of D♭ major, while the beat is set in common time which moves at a moderate pace of 100 beats per minute. It has a sequence of D♭–B♭m–D♭ as its chord progression. Carey's vocals in the song span from the note of D_{3} to the high note of C_{7}. The song has a "percolating beat" over which Carey sings with nasal, silken and declarative vocals. The verses feature Carey's signature melismatic style, combined with rapid yet seamless transitions; for example, Carey starts the second verse already in mid-belt "It's a shame to be" while then going off into a whispering coo for "so euphoric and weak."

Aside from background vocal stylings from Lorenz and other women, Carey added her own lowered vocals into the song, giving the impression of a "doubled voice." "Heartbreaker" samples the 1982 song "Attack of the Name Game" by Stacy Lattisaw. The song's hook and loop were taken and incorporated into the melody of "Heartbreaker", as well as being used as its main instrumental components. The lyrics are constructed in the verse-pre-chorus-chorus form. Carey starts with the hook "Gimme your love, gimme your love," repeated eight times. Carey repeats the chorus four times, ending the song with a final "Gimme your love, gimme your love." Chuck Taylor from Billboard described its instrumentation as a "persistent guitar lick" and wrote "There's an identifiable chorus here, and some semblance of verses, but more than anything, this song comes across as a blur of jumbled voices in the background (à la Lauryn Hill), including Carey's own repetitive harmonies, which in this case sound more like a competition than a compliment."

== Remixes ==
The song's main remix, titled Desert Storm Remix, features female rappers Da Brat and Missy "Misdemeanor" Elliott. It is the first of Carey's remixes that was produced by Desert Storm Records producer and rapper DJ Clue, who makes an introduction on the remix. The remix contains lyrical interpolations and an instrumental sample from "Ain't No Fun (If the Homies Can't Have None)" by Snoop Dogg. In an interview with MTV News, Carey spoke of the song's remix before its official release in August 1999: "And then the remix. I'm so excited about the remix. It's also gonna go on the album, and it features Missy Elliott and Da Brat, and it's kinda like a girl-power answer record, and it's to the loop of Snoop [Dogg]'s 'Ain't No Fun.' They're not ready for that one!". A separate music video was filmed for the remix, shot in black and white and featuring a cameo appearance by Dogg. The Desert Storm Remix received mixed reviews from music critics. Stephen Thomas Erlewine chose the song as one of the top three cuts on Rainbow, alongside the original. Danyel Smith from Entertainment Weekly called it "[an] overblown [...] miscalculation" and wrote "Missy Elliott's and Da Brat's bad sexual politics sink the tired 'Heartbreaker [Remix].' Larry Flick from Billboard, called the remix "muscular" and "street-savvy" and wrote "Missy Elliott and Da Brat lace rhymes into the track, which is enhanced by the sample from Snoop Dogg's 'Ain't No Fun (If The Homies Can't Have None)'."

Additional remixes of "Heartbreaker" include a remix produced by Junior Vasquez that interpolates "If You Should Ever Be Lonely" by singer Val Young, as well as a live mashup of "Heartbreaker" and "Love Hangover" by Diana Ross, performed for VH1 Divas 2000: A Tribute to Diana Ross tribute for Ross. The latter remix was released for digital download and streaming in October 2020, when Carey released the "Heartbreaker" EP as part of her #MC30 EP series.

== Critical reception ==
Professional ratings
Review scores
Source	Rating
AllMusic	2/5 stars
Entertainment Weekly	F
Peterborough Herald & Post	2/5
Stereogum	7/10

"Heartbreaker" received mixed reviews from contemporary music critics, some of whom compared it heavily to Carey's previous lead singles. Dara Cook from MTV called the song an "airy ditty" and wrote "[On the song] Mariah exudes as much sentiment as hollowed-out driftwood." Cook continued onto the song's production, writing "By texturing it into the song, producers Jimmy Jam and Terry Lewis have finally found productive use (other than song closing spectacle) for Mariah's high octave shriek." AllMusic editor Stephen Thomas Erlewine named "Heartbreaker" as one of his top three choices from the album. Danyel Smith from Entertainment Weekly called the song a "delectable confection" and wrote "she smartly uses Jay-Z's droll rap about a bratty girlfriend as tart counterpoint to her creamy tones," however calling it a recycled version of Carey's previous songs "Dreamlover" (1993) and "Fantasy" (1995). Elysa Gardner from the Los Angeles Times called the song "breezy" and noted how Carey "brings a similarly light, sensuous touch" to "Heartbreaker". Additionally, Gardner complimented Jay-Z's rap verses, calling them "sly."

Editor from Rolling Stone Arion Berger, called it "nasal, silken and declarative" while "riding the percolating beat." Additionally, Berger also compared it to Carey's "Fantasy", for its similar usage of a sampled hook. Tom Sinclair from Entertainment Weekly reviewed the song individually, giving it an F. He called it a "rehash" of "Fantasy" and wrote "What self-respecting artist would have the gall to recycle the Tom Tom Club's 'Genius of Love' (the source of 'Fantasy') for a second time in four years? It's a given that pop will eat itself, but this sort of self-cannibalization should be illegal." However, the sample used in "Heartbreaker (feat. Jay Z)" was not the same sample as the one used in "Fantasy". Chuck Taylor from Billboard gave the song a mixed review, writing "Yes it's a hit, and her voice is in fine form, but 'Heartbreaker' is a disappointment in terms of what we know she's capable of writing."

== Chart performance ==
In the United States, "Heartbreaker" was released commercially on September 21, 1999. "Heartbreaker" entered the chart at number sixty. The song became Carey's fourteenth chart-topper in the US, spending two weeks atop the Billboard Hot 100. It extended Carey's lead as the female artist with the most number one singles in the country. The only acts still ahead of Carey were Elvis Presley with seventeen (a record she surpassed in 2008 with "Touch My Body" becoming her eighteenth number one single) and the Beatles with twenty. The song was certified Gold by the Recording Industry Association of America (RIAA). Additionally, "Heartbreaker" finished at number thirty-five on the Billboard Year-End of 1999. In Canada, the song peaked at number one on the Canadian Singles Chart, becoming Carey's tenth chart-topper in the country.

In Australia, it entered the Australian Singles Chart at number eleven, on the issue dated October 10, 1999. The next week, the song ascended to its peak of number ten, where it stayed for one week, before fluctuating inside the chart for a total of seventeen weeks. "Heartbreaker" was certified platinum by the Australian Recording Industry Association (ARIA), denoting shipments of over 70,000 units within the country. In New Zealand, "Heartbreaker" was met with strong success, debuting at number four on October 10, 1999, and topping the singles chart the following week. It spent a total of eleven weeks fluctuating in the singles chart, and was certified platinum by the Recording Industry Association of New Zealand (RIANZ), denoting shipments of over 15,000 units.

In Europe, the song charted throughout several markets. In Austria, it debuted at number thirty-seven on the singles chart, eventually peaking at number seventeen. In total, "Heartbreaker" spent twelve weeks on the Austrian chart. In the two Belgium territories, Wallonia and Flanders, the song peaked at numbers nine and twenty-seven, and spent nineteen and sixteen weeks on the chart, respectively. In France, the song entered the singles chart at number seventy-seven on October 9, 1999. Eventually, it peaked at number four, becoming Carey's highest-charting single there since "Without You" (1993), which peaked at number two. The song charted for twenty-five weeks, and was certified gold by the Syndicat National de l'Édition Phonographique (SNEP), denoting shipments of over 400,000 units. In Germany, "Heartbreaker" peaked at number nine, spending twenty weeks inside the singles chart. On October 2, 1999, it entered the Dutch Single Top 100 at number sixteen, eventually peaking at number seven, and spending a total of eighteen weeks in the chart. In Norway, the song's success was limited, only peaking at number fourteen and spending only four weeks charting in the countries chart. "Heartbreaker" entered the Swedish Singles Chart at number thirty, on the issue dated October 7, 1999. It charted for a total of fourteen weeks, and attained a peak of number eighteen. In Switzerland, it spent twenty-three consecutive weeks in the singles chart, attaining a peak position of number seven, where it stayed for two weeks. On the UK Singles Chart, "Heartbreaker" debuted at its peak position of number five, during the week of November 6, 1999. It spent a total of thirteen weeks charting inside the chart, exiting on January 9, 2000.

== Music video ==
In the still, a brunette version of Carey is shown. Carey, playing herself, is seen confronting her in the restroom.

The music video for "Heartbreaker" was filmed at the Los Angeles Theatre in Downtown Los Angeles from July 30 to August 1, 1999. Directed by Brett Ratner, the music video began airing on MTV on August 16, 1999, following its premiere on the network's Making the Video series. According to Carey, the goal for the video was to mirror the lyrical content of the song, as well as showing it from a female perspective. Additionally, the video was filmed in a comedic fashion, intended to remain something "fun and exciting." The video became one of the most expensive ever made, costing over $2.5 million. Due to its strong female empowering message and nature, the video remains "a fan favorite", according to MTV News. Carey claimed that two films were used as inspirations, Grease and Enter the Dragon. Prior to filming the video, it became clear that Jay-Z would be unable to appear in the video, due to a contractual agreement not allowing him to appear in a video for two weeks after he shot for "Girl's Best Friend", his track off the soundtrack to the film Blue Streak. Jay-Z and Carey managed to film a scene for the video, which was briefly documented on Making the Video, although the documentary edited Jay-Z out of the footage to focus on Carey in order to not violate the contractual agreement. Carey then thought of creating the animated section in the video, which was quickly drawn and animated by Ratner's team.

The video begins with a car driving up to a large film theater. Carey is riding in the passenger seat and was brought there by her female friends, who tell her that her boyfriend is inside cheating on her. She is reluctant, but backed by her friends' encouragement, agrees to confront him. After convincing her, they enter the theater and begin a series of small dance routines alongside some of the theater employees. As the second verse begins, Carey enters the film projection room. Carey and her friends sit behind her boyfriend (played by Jerry O'Connell) and the woman he is cheating with. She resembles Carey, sporting a short brown wig and red clothing. During this scene, Jay-Z's rap verse is played, while an animated clip of Carey is projected onto the film screen. During Jay-Z's verse, Carey's friends begin throwing popcorn and other candies at O'Connell, prompting a small food fight in between them.

After the rap verse, O'Connell's date leaves her seat and walks toward the bathroom, prompting Carey to follow her during a short interlude in the song. Upon running into each other by the restroom, Carey confronts the woman, but the latter tries to slap Carey and the two begin to fight. The fight ends off-camera, and Carey heads back toward the film room. Meanwhile, a scene plays in the theater where Carey and her friends, wearing oversized bob wigs, dance around in a bedroom. Carey's friends continue to heckle O'Connell until she returns; as they halt their attack on him, Carey walks toward O'Connell's seat and acts as though she was his date. After he realizes who it is, Carey spills a large soda on his lap and bids him farewell.

At the end of the animated movie during Jay-Z's verse, Carey is shown with a sign with an announcement of an alternate video including an appearance from Jay-Z. This version of the video was released two weeks after the original. In place of the animated film, Jay-Z is shown rapping his verse in a Jacuzzi while Carey and a security guard appear behind.

== Live performances ==
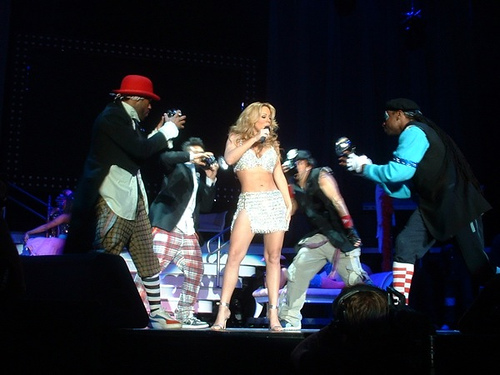
Carey and her dancers performing "Heartbreaker" on the Charmbracelet Tour in 2003

In order to promote "Heartbreaker", Carey performed the song live on several television and award show appearances, as well as recorded her own Fox Broadcasting Company special. Titled The Mariah Carey Homecoming Special, it was a mini-concert filmed at Carey's old high school in Huntington, New York. The special aired on Fox on December 21, 1999, and featured Jay-Z live on stage for his verses. Carey performed "Heartbreaker" and its accompanying remix at the MTV European Music Awards, held on November 11, 1999, in Dublin, Ireland. For the performance, Da Brat and Missy "Misdemeanor" Elliott both joined Carey on-stage. Additionally, the song was performed on The Oprah Winfrey Show, which again featured the female duo live on stage, British music chart program Top of the Pops, French program Vivement Dimanche, and The Today Show.

For Rainbow, Carey embarked on her fourth concert tour, titled the Rainbow World Tour (2000). Throughout it, Carey performed the song live during every show. The synopsis behind each performance was a wrestling match in between Carey and Storm, where Carey would sing the remix and original versions of the song throughout each small interlude of the fight. Carey was brought out with boxing gloves to the stage, performing the remix version of the song. After she began wrestling and boxing with Storm, she defeated her, prompting her to begin the original version of the song. "Heartbreaker" featured a very different set up for Carey's Charmbracelet World Tour: An Intimate Evening with Mariah Carey (2002–03). During the tour, Carey wore a sparkling, Swarovski bikini number, and performed both the remix and original versions back-to-back. Several male and female dancers were on stage during the performances, as well as different musicians and back-up vocalists. During Carey's following tour, The Adventures of Mimi Tour, "Heartbreaker" was once again performed at each of the shows. For the song's recital, Carey's donned a black bikini and matching silk cape, as well as Christian Louboutin platform pumps. Several male dancers were present on stage, wearing black overalls and jackets while performing heavy dance routines. For the show at Madison Square Garden in New York City, Carey was joined by both Da Brat and Jay-Z for the remix and original versions, respectively. During the Angels Advocate Tour, the song was paired with Love Hangover by Diana Ross, and performed in a mash-up, the same as she did in VH1 Divas in 2000. For the Caution World Tour, Carey performed both the remix and original versions of the song, albeit briefly interrupted by Storm attempting to pick a fight until being knocked out by Carey; with the backup dancers dragging her offstage.

== Track listings ==
US 7-inch vinyl single

1. "Heartbreaker" (album version) – 4:48
2. "Heartbreaker" (remix) – 4:37

US 12-inch vinyl single

1. "Heartbreaker" (album version) – 4:48
2. "Heartbreaker" (remix) – 4:37
3. "Heartbreaker / If You Should Ever Be Lonely" (Junior's Club Mix) – 10:18
4. "Heartbreaker / If You Should Ever Be Lonely" (Junior's Club Dub) – 10:12
5. "Heartbreaker / If You Should Ever Be Lonely" (Junior's Hard Mix) – 10:19

US & Benulux 2-track CD single

1. "Heartbreaker" (radio edit) – 4:18
2. "Heartbreaker" (remix) – 4:37

US & South African CD maxi-single

1. "Heartbreaker" (radio edit) – 4:18
2. "Heartbreaker" (remix) – 4:37
3. "Heartbreaker / If You Should Ever Be Lonely" (Junior's Club Mix) – 10:18
4. "Heartbreaker / If You Should Ever Be Lonely" (Junior's Club Dub) – 10:11
5. "Heartbreaker / If You Should Ever Be Lonely" (Junior's Hard Mix) – 10:20

European 12-inch vinyl single

A1. "Heartbreaker" (radio edit) – 4:18
A2. "Heartbreaker" (remix) – 4:36
B1. "Heartbreaker / If You Should Ever Be Lonely" (Junior's Club Mix) – 10:18
B2. "Heartbreaker / If You Should Ever Be Lonely" (Junior's Club Dub) – 10:11

Australian CD & European CD1 maxi-single

1. "Heartbreaker" (album version) – 4:48
2. "Heartbreaker" (remix) – 4:36
3. "Heartbreaker" (no rap version) – 3:20
4. "Heartbreaker / If You Should Ever Be Lonely" (Junior Heartbreaker Club Mix) – 10:14

European CD2 maxi-single

1. "Heartbreaker" (remix) – 4:36
2. "Heartbreaker / If You Should Ever Be Lonely" (Junior's Club Dub) – 10:12
3. "Heartbreaker / If You Should Ever Be Lonely" (Junior's Hard Mix) – 10:19

UK Enhanced CD1 maxi-single

1. "Heartbreaker" (radio edit) – 4:18
2. "Heartbreaker / If You Should Ever Be Lonely" (Junior's Club Mix) – 10:18
3. "Sweetheart" (Lil Jon Remix) – 3:55
4. "Heartbreaker" (video)

UK Limited CD2 maxi-single

1. "Heartbreaker" (no rap version) – 3:20
2. "Heartbreaker" (remix) – 4:36
3. "The Roof" (Mobb Deep Mix) - 5:29

French CD maxi-single

1. "Heartbreaker" (album version) – 4:48
2. "Heartbreaker" (remix) – 4:36
3. "Theme from Mahogany (Do You Know Where You're Going To?)" (Diana Ross cover) - 3:47

Japanese CD maxi-single

1. "Heartbreaker" (album version) – 4:48
2. "Heartbreaker" (no rap version) – 3:20
3. "Heartbreaker" (remix) – 4:36

Digital EP (Remixes)

1. "Heartbreaker" (album version)- 4:48
2. "Heartbreaker" (Remix) – 4:37
3. "Heartbreaker / If You Should Ever Be Lonely" (Junior's Heartbreaker Club Mix) – 10:18
4. "Heartbreaker / If You Should Ever Be Lonely" (Junior's Heartbreaker Club Dub) – 10:10
5. "Heartbreaker / If You Should Ever Be Lonely" (Junior's Heartbreaker Hard Mix) – 10:19

MC30 digital EP

1. "Heartbreaker" (Remix) – 4:37
2. "Heartbreaker" (No Rap Version) – 3:20
3. "Love Hangover / Heartbreaker" (Live) – 5:15
4. "Heartbreaker / If You Should Ever Be Lonely" (Junior's Heartbreaker Club Mix) – 10:19
5. "Heartbreaker / If You Should Ever Be Lonely" (Junior's Heartbreaker Club Dub) – 10:11
6. "Heartbreaker / If You Should Ever Be Lonely" (Junior's Heartbreaker Hard Mix) – 10:19

2023 12-inch vinyl single

A1. "Heartbreaker" (album version) – 4:46
B1. "Heartbreaker / If You Should Ever Be Lonely" (Junior's Heartbreaker Club Mix) – 10:19

The Junior Vasquez Mixes

1. "Heartbreaker" (Junior's Single Mix) – 4:15
2. "Heartbreaker" (Junior's Mixshow Mix) – 6:50
3. "Heartbreaker" (Junior's Vocal Club Mix) – 7:38
4. "Heartbreaker / If You Should Ever Be Lonely" (Junior's Club Mix Edit) – 6:57
5. "Heartbreaker / If You Should Ever Be Lonely" (Junior's Club Mix) – 10:19
6. "Heartbreaker / If You Should Ever Be Lonely" (Junior's Club Dub) – 10:13
7. "Heartbreaker / If You Should Ever Be Lonely" (Junior's Vocal Anthem) – 14:31
8. "Heartbreaker / If You Should Ever Be Lonely" (Junior's Hard Mix) – 10:20
9. "Heartbreaker / If You Should Ever Be Lonely" (Junior's Hard Dub) – 9:33

== Credits and personnel ==
Credits are adapted from the Rainbow liner notes.

- Mariah Carey – co-production, songwriting, vocals
- Shawn Carter – songwriting, vocals
- DJ Clue – co-production
- Shirley Elliston – songwriting
- Lincoln Chase – songwriting
- Michael Walden – songwriting
- Jeffrey Cohen – songwriting

== Charts ==
=== Weekly charts ===
Weekly chart performance
Chart (1999–2000)	Peak position
Australia (ARIA)	10
Austria (Ö3 Austria Top 40)	17
Belgium (Ultratop 50 Flanders)	27
Belgium (Ultratop 50 Wallonia)	9
Canada Singles (SoundScan)	1
Canada CHR/Top 40 (BDS)	6
Canada Top Singles (RPM)	5
Canada Adult Contemporary (RPM)	3
Canada Dance/Urban (RPM)	2
Croatia (HRT)	3
Denmark (IFPI)	8
Europe (Eurochart Hot 100)	4
Finland (Suomen virallinen lista)	14
France (SNEP)	4
France Airplay (SNEP)	1
Germany (GfK)	9
Greece (IFPI)	7
Iceland (Íslenski Listinn Topp 40)	6
Ireland (IRMA)	19
Italy (FIMI)	8
Italy Airplay (Music & Media)	1
Japan (Oricon)	37
Netherlands (Dutch Top 40)	7
Netherlands (Single Top 100)	7
Netherlands Airplay (Aircheck Nederland)	8
New Zealand (Recorded Music NZ)	1
Norway (VG-lista)	14
Poland Airplay (Music & Media)	2
Scottish Singles Sales (Official Charts)	11
Spain (Promusicae)	2
Spain Airplay (Music & Media)	9
Sweden (Sverigetopplistan)	18
Switzerland (Schweizer Hitparade)	7
UK Singles (Official Charts)	5
UK Hip Hop/R&B (Official Charts)	1
UK Club (Music Week)	29
UK Pop Club (Music Week)	3
UK Urban Club (Music Week)	1
UK Airplay (Music Control)	16
US Billboard Hot 100	1
US Crossover (Billboard)	4
US Dance Club Songs (Billboard)	2
US Dance Singles Sales (Billboard)	1
US Hot R&B/Hip-Hop Songs (Billboard)	1
US Pop Airplay (Billboard)	21
US Rhythmic Airplay (Billboard)	3
US Top 40 Tracks (Billboard)	16
US CHR/Pop (Radio & Records)	21
US CHR/Rhythmic (Radio & Records)	2
US Urban (Radio & Records)	5

=== Year-end charts ===
1999 year-end chart performance
Chart (1999)	Position
Australia (ARIA)	50
Belgium (Ultratop 50 Wallonia)	71
Canada Top Singles (RPM)	34
Canada Adult Contemporary (RPM)	26
Canada Dance/Urban (RPM)	24
Europe (Eurochart Hot 100)	34
Europe Airplay (Music & Media)	47
France (SNEP)	41
Germany (Media Control)	93
Netherlands (Dutch Top 40)	39
Netherlands (Single Top 100)	67
New Zealand (RIANZ)	7
UK Singles (OCC)	118
UK Urban (Music Week)	4
US Billboard Hot 100	35
US Dance Club Play (Billboard)	41
US Hot R&B/Hip-Hop Singles & Tracks (Billboard)	36
US Mainstream Top 40 (Billboard)	86
US Maxi-Singles Sales (Billboard)	6
US Rhythmic Top 40 (Billboard)	26
US CHR/Pop (Radio & Records)	86
US CHR/Rhythmic (Radio & Records)	22
US Urban (Radio & Records)	76

2000 year-end chart performance
Chart (2000)	Position
Brazil (Crowley)	41
US Rhythmic Top 40 (Billboard)	58
US CHR/Rhythmic (Radio & Records)	64

== Certifications ==
Certifications
Region	Certification	Certified units/sales
Australia (ARIA)	Platinum	70,000^{^}
France (SNEP)	Gold	250,000^{*}
New Zealand (RMNZ)	Platinum	30,000^{‡}
United Kingdom (BPI)	Gold	400,000^{‡}
United States (RIAA)	2× Platinum	2,000,000^{‡}
^{*} Sales figures based on certification alone.^{^} Shipments figures based on certification alone.^{‡} Sales+streaming figures based on certification alone.

== Release history ==
Release dates and formats
Region	Date	Format(s)	Label(s)	Ref(s).
United States	August 23, 1999	Adult contemporary radio; hot adult contemporary radio; modern adult contemporary radio	Columbia	
United States	August 24, 1999	Contemporary hit radio; rhythmic contemporary radio; urban contemporary radio	Columbia	
United States	September 21, 1999	7-inch vinyl; 12-inch vinyl; cassette; CD; maxi CD	Columbia	
Japan	September 22, 1999	Maxi CD	SME	
France	September 27, 1999	12-inch vinyl	Sony Music	
Germany	September 27, 1999	12-inch vinyl; CD; maxi CD	Sony Music	
Australia	October 4, 1999	Maxi CD	Sony Music	
France	October 4, 1999	Maxi CD	Sony Music	
France	October 12, 1999	CD	Sony Music	
United Kingdom	October 18, 1999	Cassette; maxi CD	Columbia	
Belgium	October 25, 1999	Maxi CD	Sony Music	
Various	October 9, 2020	Digital download; streaming (EP)	Legacy	
Canada; United States	February 17, 2023	12-inch vinyl (Urban Outfitters exclusive)	Sony Music	
