= Thank God I Found You =

1999 single by Mariah Carey

Single by Mariah Carey featuring Joe and 98 Degrees

from the album Rainbow
- B-side: "Babydoll"
- Released: November 15, 1999
- Recorded: September 1999
- Studio: Capri Digital (Capri); Avatar (New York City)
- Genre: Pop; R&B
- Length: 4:17
- Label: Columbia
- Composers: Mariah Carey; James Harris III; Terry Lewis
- Lyricist: Mariah Carey
- Producers: Mariah Carey; Jimmy Jam and Terry Lewis

Mariah Carey singles chronology
"Heartbreaker" (1999)	"Thank God I Found You" (1999)	"Things That U Do" (2000)

Joe singles chronology
"No One Else Comes Close" (1998)	"Thank God I Found You" (1999)	"I Wanna Know" (1999)

98 Degrees singles chronology
"This Gift" (1999)	"Thank God I Found You" (1999)	"Give Me Just One Night (Una Noche)" (2000)

Music videos
- "Thank God I Found You" on YouTube; "Thank God I Found You" (Make It Last Remix) on YouTube

"Thank God I Found You" is a song by American singer-songwriter Mariah Carey featuring fellow American singer-songwriter Joe and American boy band 98 Degrees. It was released on November 15, 1999, through Columbia Records, as the second single from her seventh studio album, Rainbow (1999). Written and produced by Carey alongside Jimmy Jam and Terry Lewis, the song is a soulful pop power ballad with lyrics depicting a powerful love relationship in which the protagonist tells her lover "thank God I found you", that was inspired by a relationship Carey was going through at the time.

"Thank God I Found You" received mixed reviews from contemporary music critics; some felt it was a great album closer while others deemed it "un-listenable" and "forgettable". Nevertheless, the song became Carey's fifteenth number-one single on the United States Billboard Hot 100 and remained her last chart-topping single until her 2005 comeback single "We Belong Together"; it remains the only chart-topper to date for 98 Degrees and was the first of only two for Joe. The single was later certified Gold by the Recording Industry Association of America (RIAA). Aside from its peak of number two in Canada, the song achieved moderate international charting, reaching the top-ten in Spain, Poland and the United Kingdom; and peaking within the top-thirty in Australia, Belgium (Wallonia), France, Germany, the Netherlands and Switzerland.

A DJ Clue-produced remix titled "Thank God I Found You (Make It Last Remix)" uses re-recorded vocals from Carey and features guest vocals from Joe and Carey's label-mate, rapper Nas. The remix is a remake of Keith Sweat's song "Make It Last Forever" (1988), transforming it into a slow groove R&B number, while incorporating a few verses from the original version of "Thank God I Found You".

A music video for "Thank God I Found You", directed by Brett Ratner, features Carey, Joe and 98 Degrees performing the song at an outdoor concert. The Make It Last Remix had its own video commissioned, which was shot in a grainy fashion in Hamburg, Germany, and shows Carey and the song's featured artists performing at a small club. Carey performed the song's original version and accompanying remix live at the 27th Annual American Music Awards. It appeared on the set-lists of the Rainbow World Tour (2000) and The Adventures of Mimi Tour (2006), with Trey Lorenz serving as the male vocalist.

In September 2000, US songwriters Seth Swirsky and Warryn Campbell filed a copyright infringement lawsuit against Carey claiming that "Thank God I Found You" borrowed heavily from the song "One of Those Love Songs" they composed for R&B group Xscape. Though initially the case was dismissed, in the precedent-setting Swirsky v. Carey decision, which clarified the standard for proving copyright infringement, the United States Court of Appeals for the Ninth Circuit overturned the initial 2002 dismissal of the case. The case was settled out of court in April 2006.

== Background and recording ==
Carey and her husband, Tommy Mottola, who was a Sony Music executive, separated in 1997. This resulted in a strained relationship with Sony. By the spring of 1999, Carey had begun work on her last album of her contract with Columbia Records, titled Rainbow. Her relationship with Sony had affected her collaboration with writing partner Walter Afanasieff, who had worked with her throughout the first half of her career. As a result, she worked extensively with many other songwriters and producers for the album, including the duo Jimmy Jam and Terry Lewis (known for their work with Janet Jackson), with whom Carey co-wrote and co-produced "Thank God I Found You". When Jam and Lewis first started working with Carey, they did not have a definite idea of what Carey expected from them. In an interview with Fred Bronson, Jam and Lewis explained:

It wasn't like Janet [Jackson], where we all grew up together. Mariah had done her own thing and had been very involved with the arranging and production of her records, so we respected that and said, 'What can we do for you?' She would fly into town for five or six hours. She'd get on a plane and fly to whatever was the next thing she was doing.

One night, Jam and Lewis received a call from Carey's assistant telling them that Carey had an idea for a song. She asked them to meet her at the studio later that night, and when they arrived, Carey sang the song's melody for them. Normally when Carey was composing songs, James "Big Jim" Wright would play the chords. He was not present at the studio that night, so Lewis played the chords for Carey. After composing the melody, Carey recorded her vocals. When Carey requested male singers to sing along with her on the track, Jam and Lewis recruited R&B singer Joe. Although Jam and Lewis wanted to feature K-Ci & JoJo on the song, they dropped the idea because they are signed to a different record label. About the recording, Joe said:

She [Carey] gave me a call, and she was like, "I would love to do a duet with you. Come by the studio." When I got there, she played the song for me. I didn't expect to record the song, but when I heard it, I said, "Man, there's no way I'm going to leave this studio without my voice being on that record." Everything just happened so fast. I didn't expect for it to be a single or a video. Everything was just great.

Jam and Lewis also asked the boy band 98 Degrees to join Carey and Joe on the track, as they wanted male harmonies. Carey talked about the collaboration in an interview with MTV. "It's like when I was writing 'One Sweet Day'. It really cried out for a group to be singing with me and for a strong male-female thing in terms of going back and forth, vocally. So you know, we just naturally came together." The vocals were recorded at Capri Digital Studios, Capri, Italy and Avatar Studios, New York City. The track was mixed by Supa Engineer Duo at Right Track Recording and mastered by Herb Powers.

== Composition ==
"Thank God I Found You" (2000)
A 25-second sample of "Thank God I Found You"'s bridge and the last chorus. The song is a love song which features vocals from Joe and 98 Degrees.

"Thank God I Found You" was produced by Jimmy Jam and Terry Lewis, and co-produced by Carey. The song is a moderately-paced R&B power ballad. Arion Berger of Rolling Stone noted that the song also exhibits influences of gospel music. The song carries an upbeat tone, backed by slow "manufactured pop beats". According to the sheet music published at Musicnotes.com by EMI Music Publishing, "Thank God I Found You" is written in the key of B♭ major. The beat is set in common time, and is set at a tempo of sixty-five beats per minute. The song follows the sequence of B♭–F/A–Gm_{7}–F–E♭–F as its chord progression. Carey's and Joe's vocals in the song span over two octaves, from the note of D♭_{4} to the high note of D_{6}. Composed in verse–chorus–bridge form, the chorus of "Thank God I Found You" is sung in the key of B♭ major; Carey also makes use of melisma in the song. The final chorus is set a minor 3rd higher in the key of D♭ major. The arrangement is similar to Carey's "One Sweet Day". Lyrically, the song is an inspirational love song, in which the protagonist thanks God for finding her the perfect partner. According to Carey, it was inspired by the relationship she was in with Latin singer Luis Miguel at that time. She stated that she was telling a story through the song.

=== Remixes ===
Carey re-recorded her vocals for the song's main remix titled "Thank God I Found You" (Make It Last Remix). The remix is a remake of Keith Sweat's "Make It Last Forever" (1988), and bears few lyrical similarities to the original version of the song. Carey wrote new lyrics for the song, preserving the chorus of the original song. Produced by DJ Clue of Desert Storm Records, the remix is a midtempo tune backed by "R&B-savvy rhythms" over a slow groove. It features vocals from Joe and rapped verses by Columbia Records label-mate Nas. The remix is included on Joe's third studio album My Name Is Joe (2000). Jose F. Promis of Allmusic wrote that he felt the remix seemed unfinished. He added that could have "simply covered the song and kept its integrity intact, instead of meshing it into a sort of half-"Thank God I Found You"/"Make It Last Forever" creation." However, while reviewing My Name Is Joe, Matt Diehl of Entertainment Weekly picked the track as the best from the album. He wrote "Nas' grit and Carey's expert emoting make Joe sing with unexpected feeling." Derek Ali of Dayton Daily News commended the collaboration, saying "it works out well." The "Make It Last" remix is featured on Carey's first remix album The Remixes (2003). The Norwegian production team Stargate produced the UK Stargate radio mix.

== Critical response ==
Professional ratings
Review scores
Source	Rating
AllMusic	2/5 stars
Stereogum	2/10
The Wichita Eagle	4/4 stars

"Thank God I Found You" garnered mixed reviews from music critics. Jose F. Promis of Allmusic wrote that the song is "[a] lush, classic Carey-styled adult contemporary ballad, with uplifting lyrics and a sea of soaring vocals." The Austin American-Statesman viewed the song as a "dramatic closer". Arion Berger of Rolling Stone praised the song's production and the harmony that 98 Degrees contributed. Chuck Campbell of The Daily News was also positive stating the song was a "grandiose" album-closer. Steve Jones of USA Today wrote that Carey excelled in the song. Melissa Ruggieri of the Richmond Times-Dispatch noted that Carey found solace in the song. Anthony Johnson, also of the Richmond Times-Dispatch wrote that the track is a "surefire winner". However, a few other critics deemed the song as forgettable. Dan DeLuca of The Philadelphia Inquirer dismissed the song as a "colorless quality romance". Robert Hilburn of Los Angeles Times was also negative in his review, calling it as an "overwrought ballad" and wrote it was un-listenable.

Dara Cook of MTV Southeast Asia named the song as "a big-production tragicomedy of hilarious histrionics and absurdly dramatic lyrics." While reviewing Carey's compilation The Ballads (2009), Chuck Campbell of The Press of Atlantic City wrote that at some point in Carey's career, the quality her songs got "iffier" and commented that "Thank God I Found You" is such an example. He went on to say that the song was a "trifle". In 2005 Andrew Unterberger of Stylus gave a negative review, writing the song was "a sub-par, extremely lazy example of an artist reaching the top spot almost solely on reputation." He wrote that the song would have been the end of Carey's career. At the 43rd Grammy Awards held in February 2001, the song was nominated in the category of the Best Pop Collaboration with Vocals, but lost to B.B. King and Dr. John for "Is You Is or Is You Ain't My Baby". At the First BMI Urban Awards, held in 2001, Jam, Lewis, and Carey received BMI's Urban Songwriter Award.

== Commercial performance ==
In the United States, Columbia released "Thank God I Found You" to radio stations as the second single from Rainbow in November 1999. A physical single was later released on January 25, 2000, in the US and on February 28, 2000, in the United Kingdom. The issue dated December 11, 1999, debuted at number eighty-two on the Billboard Hot 100—Carey's lowest debut at the time. On the week dated February 19, 2000, the song reached number-one on the US Billboard Hot 100 chart, becoming Carey's fifteenth number-one single and marking her eleventh consecutive year with a number-one song. It remained Carey's last number-one hit in the US until 2005's "We Belong Together" and, to date, remains 98 Degrees' only number-one song; Joe, meanwhile, would only receive one more number-one hit later in his career: 2001's "Stutter". It was certified Platinum by the Recording Industry Association of America (RIAA) in February 2000. By February 2001 the single had sold 687,000 copies in the US alone. In Canada, the single debuted and peaked at number two on the Canadian Singles Chart.

In Australia, it entered the Australian Singles Chart at its peak of number twenty-seven, on the week dated March 12, 2000. The next week it dropped to number forty-seven. In New Zealand, it debuted on the singles chart at a position of number thirty-four, the week dated April 2, 2000. The song went down to number thirty-five next week, before dropping to number forty-four. In Europe, "Thank God I Found You" charted in a few countries. In the United Kingdom, the single debuted and peaked at number ten on the UK Singles Chart on the week dated March 11, 2000. The single stayed on the chart for ten weeks, including one re-entry at number seventy-one on the week dated May 20, 2000. In the Flanders region of Belgium, the song debuted at number forty-seven and peaked at thirty-six. In the Wallonia region, it debuted at number thirty-five and peaked at number twenty-three three weeks after its debut. In France, the single entered the singles chart at number thirty-one, the week dated March 4, 2000. The next week it ascended to its peak of number twenty-eight. It stayed on the chart for fifteen weeks. In the Netherlands, "Thank God I Found You" entered the Single Top 100 at number fifty-five, before peaking at number twenty-three the next week. The song also peaked at number twenty-eight in Germany, forty-three in Sweden, thirty-one in Ireland, and at number seventeen in Switzerland.

== Music video ==
The music video for "Thank God I Found You" was filmed by Brett Ratner in Minneapolis. The video is a tape of the performance Carey, Joe and 98 Degrees gave at the Last Chance Summer Dance summer music concert, organized by 101.3 KDWB-FM. It premiered on October 14, 1999, on MTV's Total Request Live (TRL). The video opens with scenes of Carey and Joe in the studio. Carey is with her puppy and talking on a mobile phone. The video shows saturated blue skies and behind-the-scenes footage of Carey carousing with her dog Jack and writing lyrics on a notepad. As the song starts, Carey is shown lying on red sofa, writing the lyrics on the notepad. Then she performs the song on the stage, joined by Joe and 98 Degrees. Additionally, there is a video for the "Make It Last Remix" that features Carey with braids in a nightclub with Joe and Nas. Directed by Sanaa Hamri. The video is grainy; it was shot at Bar Rosso in Hamburg, Germany on October 16 and 17, 1999.

== Live performances ==
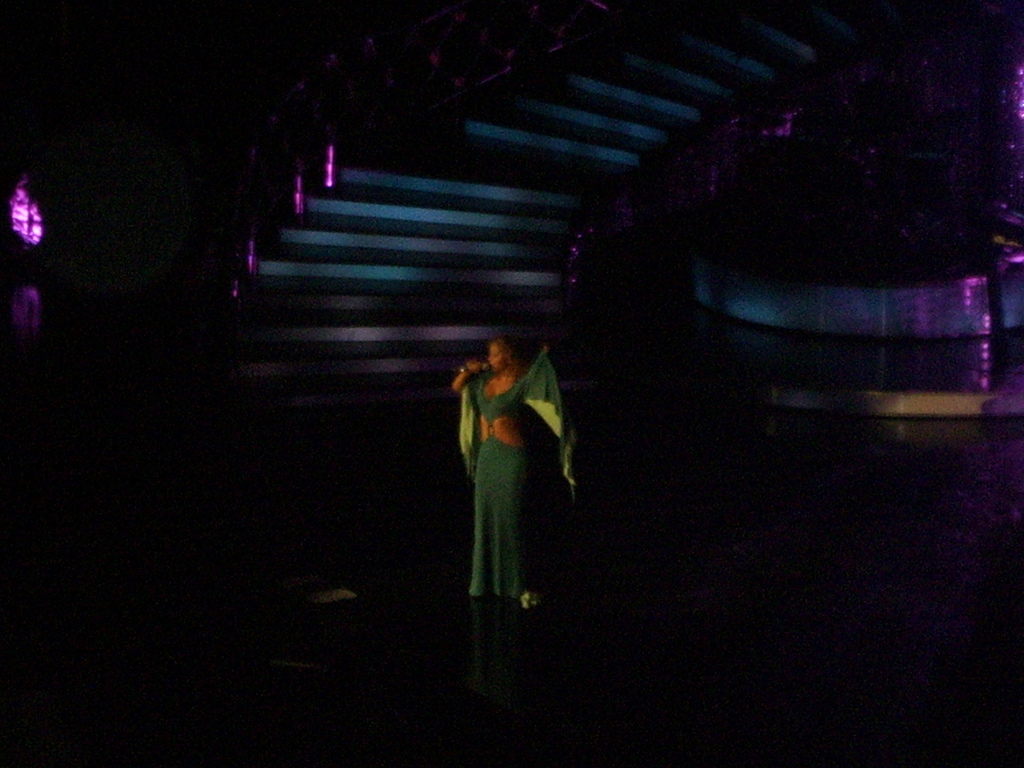
Mariah Carey performing "Thank God I Found You" on The Adventures of Mimi Tour. Her backup singer Trey Lorenz sang the verses of Joe on the tour.

"Thank God I Found You" was performed a number of times between 2000 and 2005. Carey opened the 27th Annual American Music Awards, held at the Shrine Auditorium, with a medley of the original and remix versions of the song. After Carey appeared on stage wearing a black skirt with a high slit and sporting a blond and straightened hairstyle, Joe joined her with several male and female back-up dancers, all of whom who wore black outfits. After performing the first verse and chorus, Nas joined the duo on stage for the Make It Last Remix. Later on in the show, she was honored with the "Award of Achievement" for earning a number one single in every year of the 1990s. Vibe commended the performance, writing that it "offered an insight into how a little girl from Long Island, New York became hip hop's answer to Celine Dion." In 2000, Carey performed the song on the Italian television show Quelli che... il Calcio.

Aside from the several televised and the award show performance, Carey included the song on the set-list of her concert tours, starting with the Rainbow World Tour. During the tour, Trey Lorenz, her only male background singer, replaced Joe as the song's main male vocalist. At the show at Madison Square Garden on April 11, 2000, Carey wore a long orange cocktail gown with a long cascading neck line. Lorenz, wearing a black leather sports jacket and matching pants, made another featured appearance on the tour, performing his song "Make You Happy" during an interval of costume changes following the performance. Following the release of her tenth studio effort The Emancipation of Mimi in 2005, Carey embarked on The Adventures of Mimi Tour in mid 2006. On several stops of the tour, Carey performed the song as part of the set-list, usually towards the end of the show. Similar to the Rainbow World Tour, Lorenz performed the song alongside Carey instead of Joe. Carey, wearing a midsection-baring turquoise evening gown, introduced the song to the audience by telling of its conception, concept and featured artists, followed by a performance of the song's remix.

== Lawsuit ==
On September 15, 2000, US songwriters Seth Swirsky and Warren Campbell filed a lawsuit against Carey at the 9th Circuit for copyright infringement, "reverse passing off" and false designation, claiming that "Thank God I Found You" borrowed heavily from a song they composed called "One of Those Love Songs". It was recorded by the R&B group Xscape in 1998 for their album Traces of My Lipstick. The lawsuit claimed that Carey wrongfully gave the songwriting credits to Jam and Lewis. Swirsky and Campbell had sold the rights of the song to So So Def Recordings in 1998. "I'm a fan of Mariah Carey; this is nothing personal against her. But I really do believe there's accountability, and it's very clear what happened here. I've never sued anybody before", Swirsky said. According to the district court, an expert witness (chair of the Musicology Department at UCLA) determined that the songs shared a "substantially similar chorus". The expert stated that although the lyrics and verse melodies of the two songs were different, the songs' choruses "shared a 'basic shape and pitch emphasis' in their melodies, which were played over 'highly similar basslines' and chord changes, at very nearly the same tempo and in the same generic style." He noted both the songs had their choruses sung in the key of B♭. The expert further remarked that "the emphasis on musical notes" on the two songs was the same, which "contribute[d] to the impression of similarity one hears when comparing the two songs." He presented a series of visual transcriptions of his observations. The transcriptions contained details about the pitch sequence of both the songs' chorus, melody, and bassline.

The district court labeled this evidence as insufficient to survive a motion for summary judgment. It noted the expert's methodology to be "flawed" and stated that through its own analysis, no instance of substantial similarity was found. The lawsuit was settled in favor of Carey by the US District Judge, who noted that there was no similarity in key, harmonic structure, tempo, or genre between the two songs.

However, this judgement was later reversed by a higher court. In the precedent-setting Swirsky v. Carey decision, which clarified the standard for proving copyright infringement, the United States Court of Appeals for the Ninth Circuit overturned the initial 2002 dismissal of the case, finding that Swirsky's expert did in fact adequately define the similarities between the two songs. The lawsuit was reinstated in 2004; Carey and Swirsky settled out of court in 2006.

== Track listing ==
- European maxi-CD single
1. "Thank God I Found You" – 4:17
2. "Thank God I Found You" (Celebratory Mix) – 4:19
3. "Thank God I Found You" (Make It Last Remix feat. Joe & Nas) – 5:10
4. "Thank God I Found You" (Make It Last Remix Instrumental) – 5:10
- UK 12-inch vinyl
1. "Thank God I Found You" (Make It Last Remix feat. Joe & Nas) – 5:10
2. "Thank God I Found You" (Make It Last Remix without Rap feat. Joe) – 5:10
3. "Thank God I Found You" (Make It Last Instrumental) – 5:10
4. "Thank God I Found You" (Celebratory Mix) – 4:19
- UK CD single 1
1. "Thank God I Found You" (Stargate Radio Edit) – 4:20
2. "Thank God I Found You" (Make It Last Remix) – 5:10
3. "Babydoll" – 5:06
- UK CD single 2 (limited edition)
1. "Thank God I Found You" (Celebratory Mix) – 4:19
2. "One Sweet Day" – 4:41
3. "I'll Be There" – 4:24
- US CD single and 7-inch vinyl single
1. "Thank God I Found You" – 4:17
2. "Thank God I Found You" (Celebratory Mix) – 4:19
- US maxi-CD single
1. "Thank God I Found You" (Make It Last Remix Edit feat. Nas & Joe) – 4:13
2. "Thank God I Found You" (Make It Last Remix without Rap feat. Joe) – 5:10
3. "Thank God I Found You" (Album Version) – 4:17
4. "Babydoll" – 5:06
- US 12-inch vinyl
1. "Thank God I Found You" (Make It Last Remix feat. Nas & Joe) – 5:09
2. "Thank God I Found You" (Make It Last Remix Instrumental) – 5:09
3. "Thank God I Found You" (Celebratory Mix feat. Joe & 98º) – 4:19
4. "Fantasy" (feat. O.D.B.) – 4:50
- Digital download (2020)
1. "Thank God I Found You" (Make It Last Remix) – 5:09
2. "Thank God I Found You" (Make It Last Remix Edit) – 4:12
3. "Thank God I Found You" (Make It Last Remix w/o Rap) – 5:09
4. "Thank God I Found You" (Make It Last Remix Instrumental) – 5:09
5. "Thank God I Found You" (Celebratory Mix) – 4:16
6. "Thank God I Found You" (StarGate Radio Edit) – 4:19

== Credits and personnel ==
Credits adapted from Rainbow liner notes.

- Jimmy Jam and Terry Lewis – writing, production
- Mariah Carey – writing, vocals, backing vocals, production
- Joe – vocals, backing vocals
- 98 Degrees – vocals, backing vocals
- Nicki Richards – backing vocals
- Trey Lorenz – backing vocals
- Melonie Daniels – backing vocals
- Daryl Skobba – cello
- Joshua Koestenbaum – cello
- Mike Scott – guitar
- Dana Jon Chappelle – engineering
- Pete Karem – engineering (98 Degrees' vocals)
- Steve Hodge – mixing
- Bob Ludwig – mastering

== Charts ==
=== Weekly charts ===
Weekly chart performance
Chart (2000)	Peak position
Australia (ARIA)	27
Belgium (Ultratop 50 Flanders)	36
Belgium (Ultratop 50 Wallonia)	23
Canada Singles (SoundScan)	2
European Hot 100 Singles (Music & Media)	17
Europe Radio (Music & Media)	8
France (SNEP)	28
Germany (GfK)	28
Ireland (IRMA)	31
Italy (FIMI)	21
Netherlands (Dutch Top 40)	24
Netherlands (Single Top 100)	23
New Zealand (Recorded Music NZ)	34
Poland Airplay (Music & Media)	10
Scottish Singles Sales (Official Charts)	28
Spain (Promusicae)	6
Sweden (Sverigetopplistan)	43
Switzerland (Schweizer Hitparade)	17
UK Singles (Official Charts)	10
UK Urban Club (Music Week)	1
UK Hip Hop/R&B (Official Charts)	3
US Billboard Hot 100	1
US Crossover (Billboard)	8
US Hot R&B/Hip-Hop Songs (Billboard)	1
US Pop Airplay (Billboard)	28
US Rhythmic Airplay (Billboard)	9
US Top 40 Tracks (Billboard)	21
US CHR/Pop (Radio & Records)	28
US CHR/Rhythmic (Radio & Records)	8
US Urban (Radio & Records)	6
US Urban AC (Radio & Records)	20

=== Year-end charts ===
Year-end chart performance
Chart (2000)	Position
Netherlands (Dutch Top 40)	172
UK Singles (OCC)	196
UK Urban (Music Week)	35
US Billboard Hot 100	45
US Hot R&B/Hip-Hop Songs (Billboard)	28
US Rhythmic (Billboard)	43
US CHR/Rhythmic (Radio & Records)	47
US Urban (Radio & Records)	58
US Urban AC (Radio & Records)	82

== Certifications ==
Certifications and sales
Region	Certification	Certified units/sales
United States (RIAA)	Platinum	687,000

== Release history ==
List of release dates and formats for "Thank God I Found You"
Region	Date	Format(s)	Label(s)	Ref.
United States	November 15, 1999	Adult contemporary radio; hot adult contemporary radio; modern adult contemporary radio	Columbia	
United States	November 16, 1999	Rhythmic contemporary radio; urban adult contemporary radio	Columbia	
United States	November 23, 1999	Urban contemporary radio	Columbia	
Japan	January 1, 2000	Maxi CD	Sony Music Japan	
United States	January 25, 2000	12-inch vinyl; cassette; CD; maxi CD	Columbia	
United Kingdom	February 28, 2000	Cassette; maxi CD	Columbia	
Various	October 9, 2020	Digital download; streaming (EP)	Legacy	

== See also ==
- List of Billboard Hot 100 number-one singles of 2000
- List of number-one R&B singles of 2000 (U.S.)

== Bibliography ==
- Bronson, Fred (2003), The Billboard Book of Number 1 Hits, New York: Billboard Books, ISBN 0-8230-7677-6
- Shapiro, Marc (2001), Mariah Carey: The Unauthorized Biography, Toronto: ECW Press, ISBN 1-55022-444-1
