= List of Mariah Carey live performances =

Mariah Carey live performances
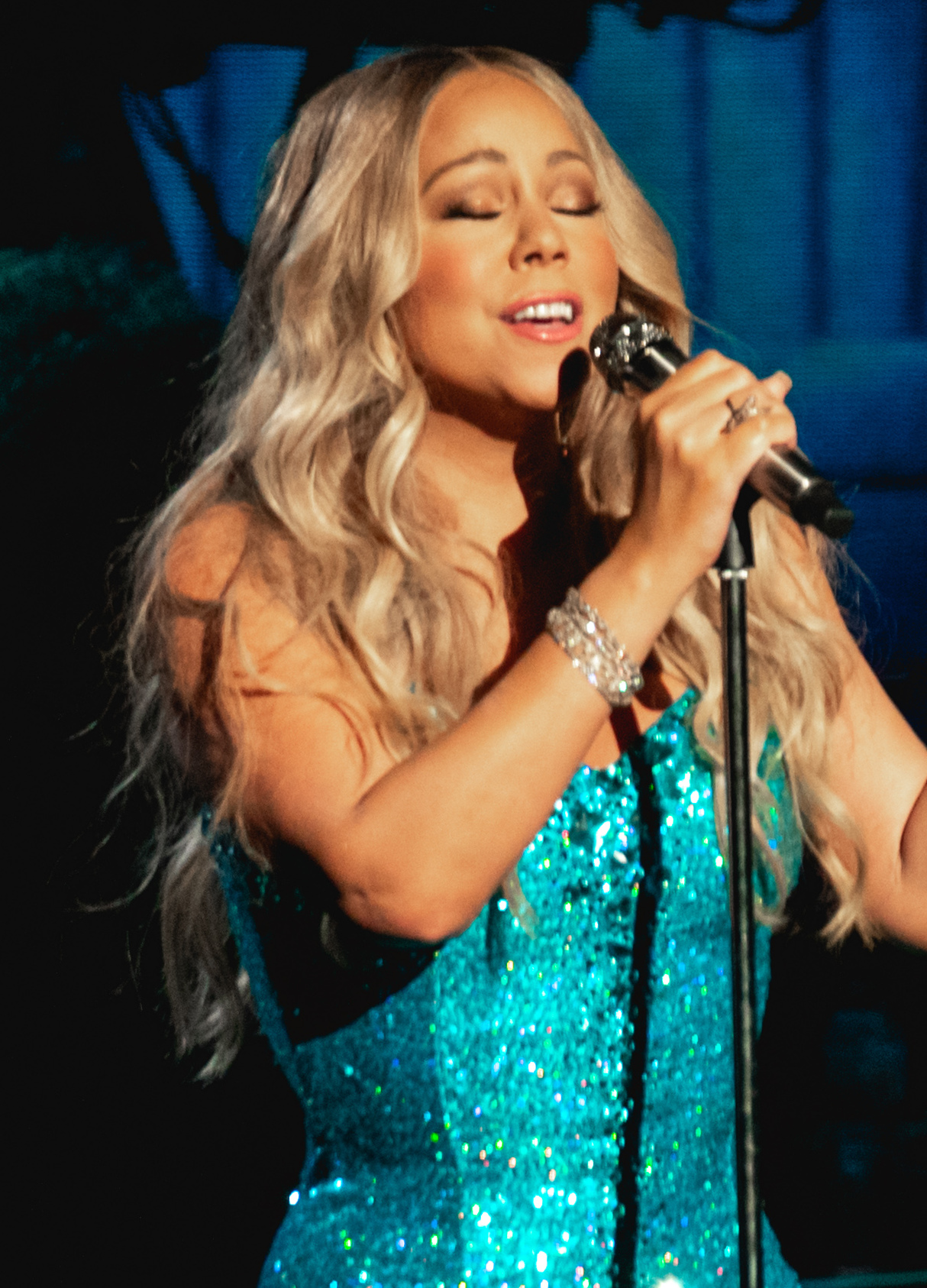
- Carey performing on the Caution World Tour in 2019.
- Concert tours: 15
- Concert residencies (including Christmas): 9

American singer-songwriter Mariah Carey has undergone fourteen tours, five residencies, along with numerous one-off concerts and televised performances. Carey did not do a significant amount of public performing in her early years in the music industry, partially due to stage fright. Despite this she still made appearances and performed at the 33rd Annual Grammy Awards and on Saturday Night Live. One of her first significant performances was at MTV Unplugged, which received positive reception as Carey silenced critics saying her vocals were studio-made. From 1993 to 2000, Carey toured for her albums: Music Box, Daydream, Butterfly and Rainbow.

In 2001, Carey did not tour for the soundtrack to her film Glitter due to being hospitalized for "extreme exhaustion". Her first performance after her 'breakdown' was a performance of "Hero" at America: A Tribute to Heroes. After the release of her ninth studio album Charmbracelet, Carey embarked another tour which targeted "arenas that typically house between 10,000 and 20,000 fans." She eventually toured for The Emancipation of Mimi, Memoirs of an Imperfect Angel, Me. I Am Mariah... The Elusive Chanteuse and Caution. She failed to tour for her eleventh studio album, E=MC², due to being pregnant at the time. She cancelled the tour but suffered a miscarriage two months later. Outside of promoting her albums, Carey has undergone an Australian Tour in 2013 to promote her single, "Triumphant (Get 'Em)". In 2016, she went on The Sweet Sweet Fantasy World Tour in Europe which was featured heavily in her reality show, Mariah's World. During the summer of the following year, Carey went on a joint tour with Lionel Richie. To kick off promotion for Caution, Carey embarked on an tour through Asia with the intent to also tour Oceania but was later cancelled due to scheduling conflicts.

Among tours, Carey has had and performed at five concert residencies. This included Live at the Pearl which was a four-evening promotional concert residency in 2009. Her first residency began in 2014 and was entitled All I Want for Christmas Is You: A Night of Joy and Festivity. The residency began on December 15, 2014, and continued through to December 15, 2019, after completing eight legs and fifty-six shows. In 2015, to support the release of her compilation album #1 to Infinity, Carey embarked on her second concert residency. The show featured all eighteen of Carey's US number-one singles at the time in chronological order. Carey's fourth residency, The Butterfly Returns, began in 2018 and continued until 2020. In 2022, Carey performed a four-day special concert, Mariah Carey: Merry Christmas To All! at Scotiabank Arena and Madison Square Garden from December 9 to 16.

Throughout her career, Carey has many notable live performances. At the 1990 NBA Finals, Carey performed "America the Beautiful" in which Rolling Stone writer, Brittany Spanos, stated the players were struck "with awe by the incredible talent of a burgeoning young star". In 2002, Carey performed "The Star-Spangled Banner" at the Super Bowl XXXVI which was called a "stunning rendition" by Billboard. She also performed "When You Believe" with Whitney Houston at the 71st Academy Awards which also went on to win the Academy Award for Best Original Song the same evening. Despite being called a "show stopper" and "the 1990s pop phenomenon", Carey's New Year's Eve performance in Times Square, New York City on December 31, 2016, received backlash after an "audio track malfunction" according to CNN. A year later in 2017, Carey took to the stage and "redeemed" herself according to Billboard, ABC and CNN with her performance being called "triumphant" and "far superior to her [previous] effort". In 2021 on Valentine's Day, Carey performed a remix of her song "We Belong Together" which NME called "a sultry Valentine's Day gift" and called Carey the "undisputed Queen of Holidays".

== Concert tours ==
Title	Date	Associated album(s)	Continent(s)	Shows	Ref.
Music Box Tour	November 3, 1993 – December 10, 1993	Music Box	North America	7	
Daydream World Tour	March 7, 1996 – June 23, 1996	Daydream	Asia; Europe	7	
Butterfly World Tour	January 11, 1998 – February 21, 1998	Butterfly	Asia; Oceania; North America	11	
Rainbow World Tour	February 14, 2000 – April 18, 2000	Rainbow	Europe; Asia; North America	19	
Charmbracelet World Tour	June 21, 2003 – February 26, 2004	Charmbracelet	Asia; North America; Europe	69	
The Adventures of Mimi	July 22, 2006 – October 25, 2006	The Emancipation of Mimi	Africa; North America; Asia	40	
Angels Advocate Tour	December 31, 2009 – February 27, 2010	Memoirs of an Imperfect Angel	North America	23	
Australian Tour 2013	January 1, 2013 – January 5, 2013	none	Oceania	3	
The Elusive Chanteuse Show	October 4, 2014 – November 16, 2014	Me. I Am Mariah... The Elusive Chanteuse	Asia; Oceania	20	
The Sweet Sweet Fantasy Tour	March 15, 2016 – November 26, 2016	none	Europe; Africa; North America	31	
All the Hits Tour (with Lionel Richie)	July 21, 2017 – September 5, 2017	none	North America	22	
Mariah Carey: Live in Concert	October 16, 2018 – November 9, 2018	none	Asia	12	
Caution World Tour	February 27, 2019 – August 31, 2019	Caution	North America; Europe	35	
Merry Christmas to All!	December 9 – December 16, 2022	Merry Christmas; Merry Christmas II You	North America	4	
Merry Christmas One and All!	November 15, 2023 – December 17, 2023	Merry Christmas; Merry Christmas II You	North America	16	
Mariah Carey's Christmas Time	November 6, 2024 – December 17, 2024	Merry Christmas; Merry Christmas II You	North America	18	

== Concert residencies ==
Title	Date	Associated album(s)	Continent(s)	Shows	Ref.
Live at the Pearl	September 11 – October 10, 2009	Memoirs of an Imperfect Angel	North America	4	
All I Want for Christmas Is You: A Night of Joy and Festivity	December 15, 2014 – December 15, 2019	Merry Christmas; Merry Christmas II You	North America; Europe	56	
#1 to Infinity	May 16, 2015 – July 18, 2017	#1 to Infinity	North America	50	
The Butterfly Returns	July 5, 2018 – February 29, 2020	none	North America	25	
The Celebration of Mimi	April 12, 2024 – November 2, 2025	The Emancipation of Mimi	North America; Asia; South America	24	

== Televised performances ==
Only performances in which dates are known are listed below.

=== Mariah Carey era (1990–91) ===
Air date	Network	Program	Location	Performed song(s)
June 1, 1990	Syndicated	The Arsenio Hall Show	Hollywood	"Vision of Love"
June 5, 1990	CBS	1990 NBA Finals	Auburn Hills	"America the Beautiful"
July 3, 1990	Veronica	Countdown	Amsterdam	"Love Takes Time" · "Vision of Love"
July 20, 1990	ABC	Good Morning America	New York City	"Vision of Love"
August 8, 1990	BBC One	Wogan	London	"Vision of Love"
September 5, 1990	TROS	Pop Formule	Hilversum	"Love Takes Time"
September 10, 1990	Syndicated	The Arsenio Hall Show	Hollywood	"Vision of Love" · "Love Takes Time"
October 5, 1990	Syndicated	It's Showtime at the Apollo	New York City	"Vision of Love" · "Love Takes Time"
October 27, 1990	NBC	Saturday Night Live	New York City	"Vision of Love" · "Vanishing"
November 10, 1990	SVT	Kulan	Stockholm	"Vision of Love" · "Love Takes Time"
November 11, 1990	DFF	Elf 99	Berlin	"Vision of Love"
November 20, 1990	NBC	The Tonight Show Starring Johnny Carson	Burbank	"Vision of Love" · "Love Takes Time"
November 21, 1990	ITV	Des O'Connor Tonight	London	"Love Takes Time"
January 28, 1991	ABC	18th Annual American Music Awards	New York City	"Someday"
February 9, 1991	TF1	Avis de recherche	Paris	"Vision of Love"
February 10, 1991	Antenne 2	Le monde est à vous	Paris	"Vision of Love"
February 20, 1991	CBS	33rd Annual Grammy Awards	New York City	"Vision of Love"

=== Emotions era (1991–92) ===
Air date	Network	Program	Location	Performed song(s)
September 5, 1991	MTV	1991 MTV Video Music Awards	Universal City	"Emotions"
September 23, 1991	Syndicated	The Arsenio Hall Show	Hollywood	"Emotions" · "Can't Let Go"
October 14, 1991	BBC One	Wogan	London	"Emotions" · "Vision of Love"
October 20, 1991	SVT	Söndagsöppet	Stockholm	"Emotions" · "Can't Let Go"
October 24, 1991	BBC One	Top of the Pops	London	"Emotions"
November 16, 1991	NBC	Saturday Night Live	New York City	"Can't Let Go" · "If It's Over"
December 23, 1991	ABC	Good Morning America	New York City	"Hark! The Herald Angels Sing"
January 23, 1992	BBC One	Top of the Pops	via satellite	"Can't Let Go"
January 24, 1992	ITV	Des O'Connor Tonight	London	"Can't Let Go"; "Emotions"
February 14, 1992	Syndicated	The Oprah Winfrey Show	Chicago	"Vision of Love" · "If It's Over"
February 15, 1992	Syndicated	Soul Train	Hollywood	"Emotions" · "Can't Let Go"
February 25, 1992	CBS	34th Annual Grammy Awards	New York City	"If It's Over"
March 16, 1992	MTV	MTV Unplugged	New York City	"Emotions" · "If It's Over" · "Someday" · "Vision of Love" · "Make It Happen" · "I'll Be There" (featuring Trey Lorenz) · "Can't Let Go"
April 27, 1992	BBC1	Wogan	London	"Make It Happen"
June 25, 1992	BBC One	Top of the Pops	London	"I'll Be There" (featuring Trey Lorenz)

=== Music Box era (1993–94) ===
Air date	Network	Program	Location	Performed song(s)
August 26, 1993	BBC One	Top of the Pops	London	"Dreamlover"
September 9, 1993	Syndicated	The Arsenio Hall Show	Hollywood	"Dreamlover" · "Hero"
September 26, 1993	SVT	Söndagsöppet	Stockholm	"Dreamlover" · "Hero"
September 29, 1993	AVRO	Grand Gala du Disc	Utrecht	"Dreamlover" · "Hero"
September 30, 1993	Antenne 2	Le monde est à vous	Paris	"Dreamlover"
October 10, 1993	TV Asahi	Music Station	Tokyo	"Dreamlover"
November 22, 1993	NBC	The Tonight Show with Jay Leno	Burbank	"Hero"
November 25, 1993 (Note: Recorded on July 18.)	NBC	Here Is Mariah Carey	Schenectady	"Emotions" · "Hero" · "Someday" · "Without You" · "Make It Happen" · "Dreamlover" · "Love Takes Time" · "Anytime You Need a Friend" · "Vision of Love" · "I'll Be There" (with Trey Lorenz)
January 9, 1994	Fuji TV	Music Fair	Tokyo	"Dreamlover" · "Without You"
February 3, 1994	BBC One	Top of the Pops	London	"Without You"
February 5, 1994	Das Erste	Verstehen Sie Spaß?	Offenburg	"Hero"
February 7, 1994	RTL 4	Ron's Jong Geluk Show	Hilversum	"Without You"
February 9, 1994	ITV	Des O'Connor Tonight	London	"Without You"
February 10, 1994	TF1	Sacrée Soirée	Paris	"Hero"
May 19, 1994	CBS	Late Show with David Letterman	New York City	"Anytime You Need a Friend"
May 30, 1994	TV Asahi	Music Station	via satellite	"Anytime You Need a Friend"
June 2, 1994	BBC One	Top of the Pops	London	"Anytime You Need a Friend"
June 3, 1994	Antena 3	Gran Gala de las Cincos Estaciones	Madrid	"Hero" · "Without You"
June 4, 1994	Das Erste	Flitterabend	Duisburg	"Without You"
June 11, 1994	Nine Network	Hey Hey It's Saturday	via satellite	"Anytime You Need a Friend" · "Hero"
September 15, 1994	BBC One	Top of the Pops	London	"Endless Love" (with Luther Vandross)
September 17, 1994	ZDF	Wetten, dass..?	Cologne	"Anytime You Need a Friend" · "Endless Love" (with Luther Vandross)
December 10, 1994	Telefe	Fer Play	via satellite	"Joy to the World"
December 25, 1994	BBC One	Top of the Pops Xmas	via satellite	"Without You"

=== Daydream era (1995–96) ===
Air date	Network	Program	Location	Performed song(s)
September 14, 1995	BBC One	Top of the Pops	via satellite	"Fantasy"
September 16, 1995	Nine Network	Hey Hey It's Saturday	via satellite	"Fantasy"
September 21, 1995	BBC One	Top of the Pops	via satellite	"Fantasy"
November 29, 1995 (Note: Recorded on October 10.)	Fox	Fantasy: Mariah Carey at Madison Square Garden	New York City	"Fantasy" · "Make It Happen" · "Open Arms" · "Dreamlover" · "One Sweet Day (with Boyz II Men) · "I'll Be There" (with Wanya Morris) · "Hero" · "Always Be My Baby" · "Forever" · "Vision of Love"
November 30, 1995	Antena 3	Lo que necesitas es amor	Madrid	"Open Arms"
December 7, 1995	BBC One	Top of the Pops	via satellite	"One Sweet Day" (with Boyz II Men)
December 9, 1995	TV4	The Stina Och Lennart Show	Stockholm	"Open Arms"
December 10, 1995	Rai Uno	Numero Uno	Turin	"Open Arms"
December 12, 1995	TF1	Sacrée Soirée	Paris	"Fantasy" · "Open Arms"
December 14, 1995	TROS	TV show	Hilversum	"Open Arms"
December 20, 1995	NHK	Pop Jam	via satellite	"Fantasy"
January 11, 1996	France 2	Le monde est à vous	Paris	"Fantasy" · "Open Arms"
January 13, 1996	ZDF	Wetten, dass..?	Bremerhaven	"Open Arms"
January 29, 1996	ABC	23rd Annual American Music Awards	Los Angeles	"Fantasy"
February 7, 1996	ITV	Des O'Connor Tonight	London	"Open Arms"
February 15, 1996	BBC One	Top of the Pops	London	"Open Arms"
February 28, 1996	CBS	38th Annual Grammy Awards	Los Angeles	"One Sweet Day" (with Boyz II Men)
March 11, 1996	TV Asahi	Music Station	Tokyo	"Open Arms"
March 12, 1996	Unknown	1996 Japan Gold Disc Awards	Tokyo	"Open Arms"
March 16, 1996	Rai Uno	Domenica in	Turin	"Open Arms"
March 18, 1996	RTL 4	De 5 Uur Show	Hilversum	"Open Arms"
May 15, 1996	C-SPAN	Police Officer's Memorial Service	Washington, D.C.	"Hero"
May 23, 1996 (Note: Recorded on October 10, 1995 and March 7–14, 1996.)	Fox	Mariah Carey: Daydream from New York to Tokyo	New York City and Tokyo	"Fantasy" / "Fantasy (Bad Boy Remix)" (featuring Ol' Dirty Bastard) · "Make It Happen" · "Underneath the Stars" · "Dreamlover" · "One Sweet Day" (with Boyz II Men) · "Forever" · "Always Be My Baby" · "Hero" · "Anytime You Need a Friend"
July 17, 1996	Nine Network	Hey Hey It's Saturday	via satellite	"Open Arms"

=== Butterfly era (1997–98) ===
Air date	Network	Program	Location	Performed song(s)
September 5, 1997	BBC One	Top of the Pops	London	"Honey (Bad Boy Remix)" (featuring Mase)
October 6, 1997	Fuji TV	Hey! Hey! Hey! Music Champ	Tokyo	"Honey"
October 27, 1997	CBS	Late Show with David Letterman	New York City	"Butterfly"
November 8, 1997	ZDF	Wetten, dass..?	Leipzig	"Butterfly"
November 12, 1997 (Note: Recorded on September 15.)	Syndicated	The Oprah Winfrey Show	Chicago	"Hero" · "Butterfly"
November 15, 1997	NBC	Saturday Night Live	New York City	"Butterfly" · "My All"
November 21, 1997	Syndicated	The Rosie O'Donnell Show	New York City	"My All"
December 6, 1997	BBC One	The National Lottery Draws	London	"Butterfly"
December 8, 1997	ITV	Talking Telephone Numbers	London	"Butterfly"
December 10, 1997	TNT	A Gift of Song: A Concert To Benefit The Children Of The World	New York City	"Butterfly"
December 11, 1997	Fox	1997 Nobel Peace Prize Concert	Oslo	"My All" · "Butterfly" · "One Sweet Day" (with Boyz II Men)
December 12, 1997	SVT	Söndagsöppet	Stockholm	"Butterfly"
December 13, 1997	M6	Hit Machine	Paris	"Butterfly" · "My All"
December 14, 1997	Canale 5	Stranamore	Milan	"My All"
January 26, 1998	ABC	25th Annual American Music Awards	via satellite	"My All"
February 25, 1998	ITV	Des O'Connor Tonight	London	"My All"
March 10, 1998	UPN	4th Annual Blockbuster Entertainment Awards	Los Angeles	"My All"
April 10, 1998	Fox	1998 Essence Awards	New York City	"If Only You Knew" / "Over the Rainbow"
April 14, 1998	VH1	VH1 Divas Live	New York City	"My All" · "Make It Happen" · "Chain of Fools" (with Aretha Franklin) · "(You Make Me Feel Like) A Natural Woman" / "Testimony" (with Aretha Franklin, Celine Dion, Gloria Estefan, Shania Twain and Carole King)
April 29, 1998	Syndicated	The Rosie O'Donnell Show	New York City	"Close My Eyes"
May 6, 1998	Unknown	1998 World Music Awards	Monaco	"My All" · "Honey (Bad Boy Remix)"
May 14, 1998	TROS	TV Show	Hilversum	"My All"
May 16, 1998	Das Erste	Einer wird gewinnen	Rotenburg an der Fulda	"My All"
May 17, 1998	Rai Uno	Domenica in	Turin	"My All"
May 19, 1998	La 1	Música sí	Madrid	"Butterfly" · "My All"
May 20, 1998	Telecinco	La llamada de la suerte	Madrid	"My All" · "Butterfly"
June 13, 1998	iHeartRadio	Wango Tango	Anaheim	"My All" / "My All" (Morales' Classic Radio Mix) · "Hero"
June 14, 1998	BBC One	Top of the Pops	London	"My All" / "My All" (Morales' Classic Radio Mix)
September 3, 1998	WGN	4th Annual Soul Train Lady of Soul Awards	Santa Monica	"My All/Stay Awhile (So So Def Remix)" (featuring Lord Tariq and Peter Gunz)
September 22, 1998	PBS	Live! One Night Only	New York City	"Got to Be Real" (with Patti LaBelle)

=== #1's era (1998–99) ===
Air date	Network	Program	Location	Performed song(s)
November 16, 1998	CBS	Late Show with David Letterman	New York City	"I Still Believe"
November 17, 1998	ABC	The View	New York City	"I Still Believe" · "Vision of Love"
November 25, 1998	Syndicated	The Oprah Winfrey Show	Chicago	"I Still Believe" · "When You Believe" (with Whitney Houston)
December 7, 1998	Fox	1998 Billboard Music Awards	Paradise	"I Still Believe"
December 9, 1998	NBC	The Tonight Show with Jay Leno	Burbank	"I Still Believe"
December 15, 1998 (Note: Recorded on January 11–February 2 and November 15.)	UPN	Mariah Carey: Around the World	Butterfly World Tour	Butterfly World Tour set list
February 11, 1999	Syndicated	The Rosie O'Donnell Show	New York City	"I Still Believe"
March 1, 1999	TROS	TV Show	Hilversum	"I Still Believe"
March 2, 1999	Telecinco	Miss España 1999	Jaén	"I Still Believe" · "My All"
March 4, 1999	BBC One	Top of the Pops	London	"Do You Know Where You're Going To"
March 5, 1999	RTL 2	The Dome	Stuttgart	"I Still Believe (Morales' Classic Club Mix Edit)" · "My All"
March 6, 1999	Das Erste	Die Lotto-Show	Bottrop	"I Still Believe"
March 8, 1999	RTÉ	Kenny Live	Dublin	"I Still Believe"
March 13, 1999	France 2	Tapis Rouge	Paris	"I Still Believe"
March 13, 1999	M6	Hit Machine	Paris	"I Still Believe"
March 21, 1999	ABC	71st Academy Awards	Los Angeles	"When You Believe" (with Whitney Houston)
April 2, 1999	BBC One	Top of the Pops	London	"I Still Believe (Morales' Classic Club Mix Edit)"
April 10, 1999	TF1	La Fureur	Paris	"I Still Believe"
June 1, 1999	Rai Uno	Pavarotti & Friends for Guatemala and Kosovo	Modena	"Hero" (with Luciano Pavarotti) · "My All" · "We Are the World" (with various artists)
June 25, 1999	SBS	MJ & Friends	Seoul	"I Still Believe" · "Hero"

=== Rainbow era (1999–2000) ===
Air date	Network	Program	Location	Performed song(s)
October 7, 1999	AVRO	1999 Golden Televizier Ring Gala	Amsterdam	"Heartbreaker"
October 12, 1999	Telecinco	Gala de la Hispandidad	Seville	"Heartbreaker" · "Against All Odds (Take a Look at Me Now)"
October 28, 1999	TV4	Sen kväll med Luuk	Stockholm	"Heartbreaker"
November 1, 1999	NBC	The Today Show	New York City	"Heartbreaker" · "Can't Take That Away (Mariah's Theme)" · "Hero"
November 2, 1999	ABC	The View	New York City	"Against All Odds (Take a Look at Me Now)" · "Can't Take That Away (Mariah's Theme)"
November 5, 1999	BBC One	Top of the Pops	London	"Heartbreaker"
November 10, 1999	M6	Hit Machine	Paris	"Heartbreaker"
November 11, 1999	MTV	1999 MTV Europe Music Awards	Dublin	"Heartbreaker (Remix)" (with Da Brat and Missy Elliott)
November 12, 1999	RTL	Top of the Pops Germany	Hürth	"Heartbreaker"
November 13, 1999	Rai Uno	Carràmba! Che fortuna	Rome	"Heartbreaker"
November 14, 1999	France 2	Vivement dimanche	Paris	"Heartbreaker"
November 19, 1999	ITV	Friday Night's All Wright	London	"Against All Odds (Take a Look at Me Now)" · "Thank God I Found You" (with Joe)
November 21, 1999	France 2	Tapis Rouge	Paris	"Heartbreaker"
November 28, 1999	Rede Globo	Domingão do Faustão	Rio de Janeiro	"Heartbreaker" · "Against All Odds (Take a Look at Me Now)" · "I Still Believe"
November 29, 1999	SBT	Hebe	São Paulo	"Against All Odds (Take a Look at Me Now)" · "My All" · "Heartbreaker"
November 30, 1999	Channel 13	Causa Común	Buenos Aires	"Against All Odds (Take a Look at Me Now)" · "Can't Take That Away (Mariah's Theme)"
November 30, 1999	Channel 13	TeleShow	Buenos Aires	"Heartbreaker" · "Rainbow (Interlude)" · "Against All Odds (Take a Look at Me Now)" · "Can't Take That Away (Mariah's Theme)" · "Hero"
December 7, 1999	Syndicated	The Oprah Winfrey Show	Chicago	"Heartbreaker (Remix)" (with Da Brat and Missy Elliott) · "Can't Take That Away (Mariah's Theme)"
December 14, 1999 (Note: Recorded on October 30.)	Fox	Mariah Carey Homecoming Special	Huntington	"Heartbreaker" / "Heartbreaker (Remix)" (with Da Brat and Jay-Z) · "Dreamlover" · "Against All Odds (Take a Look at Me Now)" · "Vision of Love" · "Fantasy (Bad Boy Remix)" · "Can't Take That Away (Mariah's Theme)" · "Rainbow (Interlude)" / "Hero"
January 8, 2000	France 2	Tapis Rouge	Paris	"Against All Odds (Take a Look at Me Now)" · "Thank God I Found You" (with Joe)
January 9, 2000	Fuji TV	Music Fair: Mariah Carey Special	Tokyo	"Heartbreaker" · "Hero"· "Thank God I Found You" (with Joe)· "Can't Take That Away (Mariah's Theme)"
January 17, 2000	ABC	27th Annual American Music Awards	Los Angeles	"Thank God I Found You" / "Thank God I Found You (Make It Last Remix)" (with Joe and Nas)
January 22, 2000	TF1	2nd NRJ Music Awards	Cannes	"Thank God I Found You" (with Joe)
January 26, 2000	VTM	1999 Golden Shoe Gala	Ostend	Thank God I Found You" (with Joe) · "Against All Odds (Take a Look at Me Now)"
January 27, 2000	La 1	Música sí	Madrid	"Against All Odds (Take a Look at Me Now)" · "Thank God I Found You" (with Joe)
January 29, 2000	ZDF	Wetten, dass..?	Leipzig	"Thank God I Found You" (with Joe)
January 29, 2000 (Note: Recorded on November 12, 1999.)	RTL	Top of the Pops Germany	Hürth	"Thank God I Found You" (with Joe)
January 30, 2000	Rai Due	Quelli che... il Calcio	Milan	"Against All Odds (Take a Look at Me Now)"
February 8, 2000	Syndicated	The Rosie O'Donnell Show	New York City	"Petals" / "Rainbow (Interlude)"
March 10, 2000	BBC One	Top of the Pops	London	"Thank God I Found You" (with Joe)
April 11, 2000 (Note: Recorded on April 9.)	VH1	VH1 Divas 2000: A Tribute To Diana Ross	New York City	"Love Hangover" / "Heartbreaker" · "Can't Take That Away (Mariah's Theme)" · "Baby Love" / "Stop! In the Name of Love" (with Diana Ross)
May 9, 2000	UPN	6th Blockbuster Entertainment Awards	Los Angeles	"Can't Take That Away (Mariah's Theme)"
May 27, 2000	Italia 1	Festivalbar 2000	Naples	"Against All Odds (Take a Look at Me Now)"
June 4, 2000 (Note: Recorded on May 26.)	RTL 2	The Dome	Stuttgart	"Against All Odds (Take a Look at Me Now)" · "Thank God I Found You" (with Trey Lorenz)
June 10, 2000 (Note: Recorded on May 25.)	RTL	Top of the Pops Germany	Hürth	"Against All Odds (Take a Look at Me Now)"
October 6, 2000 (Note: Recorded on March 10.)	BBC One	Top of the Pops	London	"Against All Odds (Take a Look at Me Now)"

=== Glitter era (2001–02) ===
Air date	Network	Program	Location	Performed song(s)
September 21, 2001	Simulcast	America: A Tribute to Heroes	Los Angeles	"Hero" · "America the Beautiful" (among Los-Angeles-based ensemble)
October 21, 2001	ABC	United We Stand: What More Can I Give	Washington, D.C.	"Never Too Far/Hero Medley" · "Last Night a DJ Saved My Life" (featuring Fabolous and DJ Clue?) · "What More Can I Give" (with rest of performers)
October 23, 2001	VH1	VH1/Vogue Fashion Awards 2001	New York City	"Last Night a DJ Saved My Life" (featuring Fabolous and DJ Clue?)
October 26, 2001	ABC	2001 Radio Music Awards	Paradise	"Never Too Far/Hero Medley"
November 22, 2001	VIVA	Interaktiv in the USA	New York City	"Never Too Far/Hero Medley" · "Without You"
November 23, 2001	Das Erste	Victoria 2001 Sports Gala	Munich	"Never Too Far/Hero Medley"
November 24, 2001	Rai Uno	Torno Sabato: La Lotteria	Benevento	"Never Too Far/Hero Medley"
November 25, 2001	Rai Uno	Domenica in	Rome	"Never Too Far/Hero Medley" · "Without You"
November 30, 2001	BBC One	2001 Top of the Pops Awards	Manchester	"Never Too Far/Hero Medley" (with Westlife)
December 1, 2001	ITV	CD:UK	London	"Never Too Far/Hero Medley"
December 2, 2001	Sat.1	Stars 2001 - Die AIDS-Gala	Berlin	"Never Too Far/Hero Medley"
December 8, 2001	M6	Hit Machine	Paris	"Last Night a DJ Saved My Life"
December 9, 2001 (Note: Recorded on December 1.)	RTL 2	The Dome	Kiel	"Never Too Far/Hero Medley" · "Without You"
December 15, 2001 (Note: Recorded on November 27.)	TV5	C'est Show!	Paris	"Last Night a DJ Saved My Life"
December 21, 2001 (Note: Recorded on November 3.)	CBS	A Home for the Holidays with Mariah Carey	Los Angeles	"Never Too Far/Hero Medley" · "Reflections (Care Enough)" · "I'll Be There" (with Trey Lorenz, Crenshaw High School Elite Choir and Susan Miller Dorsey High School Choir)
December 25, 2001 (Note: Recorded on December 18.)	BET	BET Christmas Remembrances Special	New York City	"Joy to the World" · "One Sweet Day" (with Boyz II Men)
December 30, 2001	TMF9	New York Concert	New York City	"My All" · "Never Too Far" · "Hero" · "Without You"
December 31, 2001 (Note: Recorded on November 27.)	France 2	Tapis Rouge	Paris	"Last Night a DJ Saved My Life" · "Without You"
December 31, 2001	BBC One	It's Your New Year's Eve Party	London	"Never Too Far/Hero Medley"
January 16, 2002	CBS	Muhammad Ali's 60th Birthday Celebration	Los Angeles	"Happy Birthday to You"
February 3, 2002	Fox	Super Bowl XXXVI national anthem	New Orleans	"The Star-Spangled Banner"

=== Charmbracelet era (2002–04) ===
Air date	Network	Program	Location	Performed song(s)
October 29, 2002 (Note: Recorded on October 19.)	BET	8th Annual BET Walk of Fame	Washington, D.C.	"You and I (We Can Conquer the World)"
October 30, 2002	TROS	TV Show	Hilversum	"Through the Rain"
November 2, 2002	RTL	Millionär gesucht! – Die SKL Show	Munich	"Through the Rain"
November 4, 2002	La 1	Operación Triunfo	Barcelona	"I Only Wanted" · "My All" · "Through the Rain"
November 8, 2002	BBC One	Fame Academy	London	"Through the Rain"
November 9, 2002	ITV	CD:UK	London	"Against All Odds (Take a Look at Me Now)" (with Westlife)
November 10, 2002 (Note: Recorded on November 6.)	ZDF	Das Goldene Lenkrad 2002	Berlin	"Through the Rain"
November 12, 2002	Canale 5	C'è Posta per Te	Rome	"Through the Rain"
November 13, 2002	M6	Hit Machine	Paris	"Through the Rain"
November 15, 2002	BBC One	BBC Children in Need 2002	London	"Through the Rain"
November 16, 2002	TF1	Star Academy	Saint-Denis	"Through the Rain"
November 23, 2002	ITV	CD:UK	London	"Through the Rain"
November 26, 2002	TV Asahi	Music Station	Tokyo	"Through the Rain"
November 29, 2002	BBC One	Top of the Pops	London	"Through the Rain"
December 3, 2002 (Note: Recorded on October 15.)	MTV	Shining Through The Rain	New York City	"Vision of Love" · "Boy (I Need You)" (featuring Cam'ron) · "Yours" · "The One" · "Heartbreaker (Remix)" / "Heartbreaker" (featuring Da Brat) · "Through the Rain" · "Make it Happen"
December 3, 2002 (Note: Recorded on November 21.)	Syndicated	The Oprah Winfrey Show	Chicago	"Through the Rain" · "My Saving Grace"
December 3, 2002	Rede Globo	Fantástico	Rio de Janeiro	"Through the Rain" · "I Only Wanted" · "My All"
December 7, 2002	Simulcast	Teletón	Mexico City	"My All" · "Bringin' On the Heartbreak" · "Through the Rain"
December 11, 2002	NBC	The Today Show	Bloomington	"Through the Rain" · "Boy (I Need You)" (featuring Cam'ron) · "Bringin' On the Heartbreak" · "Make It Happen"
December 17, 2002	ABC	The View	New York City	"I Only Wanted"
December 31, 2002 (Note: Recorded on December 3.)	Rede Globo	Show da Virada	Rio de Janeiro	"Through the Rain"
January 13, 2003	ABC	30th Annual American Music Awards	Los Angeles	"Through the Rain"
January 15, 2003	MTV Base	MTV Presents: Mariah Carey	London	"Yours" · "Through the Rain" · "Bringin' On the Heartbreak"
January 16, 2003	Kanal 5	NRJ Music Awards Sweden	Stockholm	"Through the Rain"
January 17, 2003	Unknown	La Legende des Voix	Paris	"Through the Rain"
January 18, 2003	TF1	5th NRJ Music Awards	Cannes	"Through the Rain"
February 9, 2003	TNT	2003 NBA All-Star Game halftime show	Atlanta	"Boy (I Need You)" · "My Saving Grace" · "Hero"
February 13, 2003	BET	106 & Park	New York City	"Boy (I Need You)" (with Cam'ron) · "Yours"
February 16, 2003	Fox	2003 Daytona 500 national anthem	Daytona Beach	"Through the Rain" · "The Star-Spangled Banner"
March 1, 2003	BET	2003 Soul Train Music Awards	Pasadena	"My Saving Grace"
March 22, 2003	ITV	Ant & Dec's Saturday Night Takeaway	London	"Boy (I Need You)"
March 23, 2003	BBC One	The National Lottery Live	London	"Bringin' On the Heartbreak"
March 26, 2003	M6	Hit Machine	Paris	"Boy (I Need You)"
March 28, 2003	Channel 4	V Graham Norton	London	"Boy (I Need You)" · "Through The Rain"
March 29, 2003	ITV	CD:UK	London	"Boy (I Need You)"
April 4, 2003	BBC One	Top of the Pops	London	"Boy (I Need You)"
April 5, 2003	RTL	Top of the Pops Germany	Hürth	"Boy (I Need You)"
June 1, 2003	NBC	The Today Show	New York City	"Yours" · "Bringin' On the Heartbreak" · "Dreamlover"
September 25, 2003	Unknown	2003 TEFI Awards	Moscow	"My All"
December 25, 2004	ABC	Walt Disney World Christmas Day Parade	Bay Lake	"Joy to the World" · "All I Want for Christmas Is You"

=== The Emancipation of Mimi era (2005–06) ===
Air date	Network	Program	Location	Performed song(s)
March 19, 2005	ZDF	Wetten, dass..?	Berlin	"It's Like That"
March 25, 2005	BBC One	Top of the Pops	London	"It's Like That"
March 26, 2005	ITV	Ant & Dec's Saturday Night Takeaway	London	"It's Like That"
March 31, 2005	Unknown	Roppongi Hills	Tokyo	"It's Like That" · "We Belong Together"
April 1, 2005	TV Asahi	Music Station	Tokyo	"We Belong Together"
April 2, 2005	Das Erste	Echo Awards	Berlin	"It's Like That"
April 2, 2005 (Note: Recorded on March 26.)	ITV	CD:UK	London	"It's Like That"
April 9, 2005	M6	Hit Machine	Paris	"It's Like That"
April 9, 2005	VH1	VH1 Save The Music	New York City	"It's Like That" (with Jermaine Dupri and Fatman Scoop) · "With You I'm Born Again" (with John Legend) · "I'll Be There" (with Trey Lorenz)
April 12, 2005	ABC	Good Morning America	New York City	"It's Like That" (with Jermaine Dupri and Fatman Scoop) · "We Belong Together" · "Make It Happen" · "Shake It Off"
April 13, 2005 (Note: Recorded on April 12.)	ABC	Good Morning America	New York City	"Fly Like a Bird"
April 13, 2005 (Note: Recorded on March 11.)	BET	BET Blueprint: The Return of the Voice	New York City	"It's Like That" (with Jermaine Dupri and Fatman Scoop) · "We Belong Together" · "Vision of Love" · "Shake It Off" (featuring Jermaine Dupri)
April 14, 2005	CBS	Late Show with David Letterman	New York City	"We Belong Together"
April 14, 2005	TBS	Utaban	Tokyo	"We Belong Together"
April 18, 2005	BET	106 & Park	New York City	"It's Like That" (featuring Fatman Scoop)
April 29, 2005	ABC	The View	New York City	"We Belong Together"
May 11, 2005	NBC	The Tonight Show with Jay Leno	Burbank	"We Belong Together"
May 13, 2005 (Note: Recorded on May 12.)	Syndicated	The Ellen DeGeneres Show	Burbank	"We Belong Together" · "It's Like That"
May 29, 2005	MTV Japan	2005 MTV Video Music Awards Japan	Urayasu	"We Belong Together"
June 4, 2005	MTV	2005 MTV Movie Awards	Los Angeles	"We Belong Together"
June 28, 2005	BET	2005 BET Awards	Los Angeles	"We Belong Together"
July 1, 2005	BBC One	Top of the Pops	London	"We Belong Together"
July 2, 2005	Simulcast	Live 8 London	London	"Make It Happen" (with African Children's Choir) · "Hero" (with African Children's Choir) · "We Belong Together"
July 4, 2005 (Note: Recorded on June 26.)	NBC	Macy's 4th of July Fireworks Spectacular	Jersey City	"America the Beautiful" · "We Belong Together" · "It's Like That"
July 19, 2005 (Note: Recorded on July 17.)	RTL 4	Staatsloterij	Amsterdam	"It's Like That" · "We Belong Together"
August 16, 2005 (Note: Recorded on July 17.)	RTL 4	Staatsloterij	Amsterdam	"Stay The Night"
August 28, 2005	MTV	2005 MTV Video Music Awards	Miami	"Shake It Off" (featuring Jermaine Dupri) · "We Belong Together Remix" (featuring Jadakiss and Styles P)
September 9, 2005	Simulcast	Shelter from the Storm: A Concert for the Gulf Coast	Los Angeles	"Fly Like a Bird"
September 13, 2005 (Note: Recorded on August 31.)	ABC	2005 World Music Awards	Los Angeles	"Shake It Off"
September 16, 2005	TF1	Star Academy	Saint-Denis	"Hero" (with Star Academy finalists) · "We Belong Together"
September 18, 2005	BBC One	Top of the Pops	London	"Get Your Number"
September 18, 2005	ITV	ASDA Tickled Pink	London	"Get Your Number" · "Shake It Off"
September 19, 2005 (Note: Recorded on August 31.)	ITV	The Paul O'Grady Show	London	"Get Your Number"
September 24, 2005 (Note: Recorded on September 17.)	ITV	CD:UK	London	"Shake It Off"
October 8, 2005 (Note: Recorded on September 17.)	ITV	CD:UK	London	"Get Your Number"
October 9, 2005 (Note: Recorded on September 18.)	BBC One	Top of the Pops	London	"Shake It Off"
October 17, 2005	Unknown	Swarovski Fashion Rocks 2005	Monaco	"We Belong Together" / "We Belong Together (Peter Rauhofer Remix)"
November 22, 2005	ABC	33rd Annual American Music Awards	Los Angeles	"Don't Forget About Us"
November 24, 2005	Fox	2005 NFL Thanksgiving Day (Lions vs. Falcons) halftime show	Detroit	"Shake It Off" · "Don't Forget About Us"
December 5, 2005	ITV	Today with Des and Mel	London	"We Belong Together" · "Don't Forget About Us"
December 15, 2005	TF1	Star Academy	Saint-Denis	"It's Like That" (with Magalie Vaé) · "Get Your Number"
December 31, 2005	ABC	Dick Clark's New Year's Rockin' Eve 2005	New York City	"It's Like That" · "Shake It Off" · "We Belong Together Remix"
February 8, 2006	CBS	48th Annual Grammy Awards	Los Angeles	"We Belong Together" · "Fly Like a Bird"

=== E=MC² era (2008–09) ===
Air date	Network	Program	Location	Performed song(s)
March 15, 2008	NBC	Saturday Night Live	New York City	"Touch My Body" · "Migrate" (with T-Pain)
March 24, 2008	MTV	The Hills Premiere Party	New York City	"Touch My Body" · "We Belong Together" · "I'm That Chick"
April 4, 2008 (Note: Recorded on April 2.)	Channel 4	The Paul O'Grady Show	London	"Touch My Body"
April 4, 2008 (Note: Recorded on April 3.)	Channel 4	The Friday Night Project	London	"Touch My Body"
April 5, 2008 (Note: Recorded on April 1.)	Channel 4	T4 Presents Mariah Carey	London	"Touch My Body" · "I'm That Chick" · "Bye Bye"
April 5, 2008	RTL	Deutschland sucht den Superstar	Cologne	"Touch My Body"
April 9, 2008 (Note: Recorded on April 6.)	Fox	Idol Gives Back 2008	Los Angeles	"Fly Like a Bird"
April 14, 2008	Syndicated	The Oprah Winfrey Show	Chicago	"Bye Bye"
April 16, 2008	BET	MC^{2}: The Relativity of Mariah	New York City	"Migrate" · "Touch My Body" · "Shake It Off" · "Love Story" · "We Belong Together"
April 16, 2008	Fox	American Idol	Los Angeles	"Bye Bye"
April 25, 2008	ABC	Good Morning America	New York City	"Touch My Body" · "I'm That Chick" · "Bye Bye"
May 30, 2008	TV Asahi	Music Station	Tokyo	"Touch My Body"
May 31, 2008	MTV Japan	2008 MTV Video Music Awards Japan	Saitama	"I'll Be Lovin' U Long Time"
June 2, 2008	Fuji TV	SMAP×SMAP	Tokyo	"Hero" (with SMAP) · "Touch My Body" (with SMAP)
June 9, 2008 (Note: Recorded on May 29.)	Fuji TV	Hey! Hey! Hey! Music Champ	Tokyo	"Touch My Body"
July 31, 2008	ABC	Jimmy Kimmel Live!	Los Angeles	"I'll Be Lovin' U Long Time" / "Touch My Body" · "Side Effects" (with Young Jeezy) · "I'm That Chick" · "Shake It Off" · "We Belong Together
August 4, 2008	Fox	2008 Teen Choice Awards	Universal City	"I'll Be Lovin' U Long Time" / "Touch My Body"
September 5, 2008	CBS	Condé Nast Fashion Rocks 2008	New York City	"I'm That Chick"
September 10, 2008	CTV	Canadian Idol	Toronto	"I'm That Chick" · "We Belong Together"
November 8, 2008	ITV	The X Factor	London	"I Stay in Love" · "Hero" (with The X Factor finalists)
November 23, 2008	ABC	36th Annual American Music Awards	Los Angeles	"I Stay in Love"
December 3, 2008	CBS	Grammy Nominations Concert 2008	Los Angeles	"Christmas (Baby Please Come Home)"
January 20, 2009	ABC	The Neighborhood Inaugural Ball (Obama Inauguration)	Washington, D.C.	"Hero"

=== Memoirs of an Imperfect Angel era (2009) ===
Air date	Network	Program	Location	Performed song(s)
July 7, 2009	Simulcast	Michael Jackson memorial service	Los Angeles	"I'll Be There" (with Trey Lorenz)
August 2, 2009	NBC	America's Got Talent	Los Angeles	"Obsessed"
September 18, 2009	Syndicated	The Oprah Winfrey Show	New York City	"I Want to Know What Love Is"
October 2, 2009	NBC	The Today Show	New York City	"Make It Happen" · "Obsessed" · "I Want to Know What Love Is" · "H.A.T.E.U."
October 2, 2009 (Note: Recorded on September 28.)	ABC	The View	New York City	"I Want to Know What Love Is"
October 14, 2009	MTV Korea	The Stage	Seoul	"I Want to Know What Love Is"
October 16, 2009	TV Asahi	Music Station	Tokyo	"I Want to Know What Love Is"
October 20, 2009 (Note: Recorded on October 5.)	iHeart Radio	Stripped	New York City	"H.A.T.E.U." · "I Want to Know What Love Is" · "Always Be My Baby" · "Obsessed" · "We Belong Together"
October 23, 2009 (Note: Recorded on October 14.)	KBS2	You Hee-yeol's Sketchbook	Seoul	"I Want to Know What Love Is" · "H.A.T.E.U."
October 24, 2009	Oi	Oi Fashion Rocks 2009	Rio de Janeiro	“Touch My Body” · "Obsessed" · “Fantasy (Def Club Mix)"
November 11, 2009	Rai 2	X Factor	Milan	"I Want to Know What Love Is"
November 13, 2009 (Note: Recorded on November 9.)	CBS	Late Show with David Letterman	New York City	"H.A.T.E.U."
November 19, 2009 (Note: Recorded on November 18.)	Channel 4	Alan Carr: Chatty Man	London	"I Want to Know What Love Is"
November 22, 2009	ITV	The X Factor	London	"I Want to Know What Love Is"
November 24, 2009	ITV	GMTV	London	"I Want to Know What Love Is"
November 26, 2009	ITV	This Morning	London	"I Want to Know What Love Is"
December 16, 2009	TBS	Lopez Tonight	Burbank	"Obsessed"
December 17, 2009 (Note: Recorded on December 16.)	TBS	Lopez Tonight	Burbank	"It's a Wrap"

=== Merry Christmas II You era (2010-12) ===
Air date	Network	Program	Location	Performed song(s)
November 30, 2010 (Note: Recorded on November 19.)	NBC	Christmas in Rockefeller Center	New York City	"Oh Santa!"
December 13, 2010 (Note: Recorded on November 6.)	ABC	Mariah Carey: Merry Christmas to You	Los Angeles	"Oh Santa!"; "When Christmas Comes"; "O Little Town of Bethlehem"/"Little Drummer Boy"; "Christmas Time Is in the Air Again"; "Here Comes Santa Claus (Right Down Santa Claus Lane)"/"Housetop Celebration; "O Holy Night"; "Joy to the World"; "Charlie Brown Christmas"/"Christmas Time Is Here"; "O Come, All Ye Faithful"/"Hallelujah Chorus (with Patricia Carey); "All I Want for Christmas Is You"
December 17, 2010 (Note: Recorded on December 12.)	TNT	Christmas in Washington	Washington, D.C.	"One Child"; "O Come, All Ye Faithful"
December 25, 2010 (Note: Recorded on December 3.)	ABC	Disney Parks Christmas Day Parade	Bay Lake	"Oh Santa!"; "All I Want for Christmas Is You"
September 5, 2012	NBC	NFL Kickoff Special	New York City	"Triumphant (Get 'Em)" (featuring Meek Mill and Rick Ross)
November 28, 2012 (Note: Recorded on November 27.)	NBC	Christmas in Rockefeller Center	New York City	"All I Want for Christmas Is You"; "Christmas Time Is in the Air Again"
December 4, 2012	NBC	Late Night with Jimmy Fallon	New York City	"All I Want for Christmas Is You" (with Jimmy Fallon and The Roots)

=== Me. I Am Mariah... The Elusive Chanteuse era (2013–14) ===
Air date	Network	Program	Location	Performed song(s)
May 16, 2013	Fox	American Idol	Los Angeles	"Vision of Love" / "Make It Happen" / "My All" / "Hero" / "We Belong Together" / "#Beautiful"
May 24, 2013	ABC	Good Morning America	New York City	"Always Be My Baby"; "We Belong Together"; "#Beautiful" (with Miguel)
June 30, 2013	BET	BET Awards 2013	Los Angeles	"#Beautiful (Remix)" (with Miguel and Jeezy)
July 4, 2013 (Note: Recorded on June 27.)	NBC	Macy's 4th of July Fireworks Spectacular	Jersey City	"America the Beautiful"; "#Beautiful" (with Miguel); "Hero"
November 12, 2013	NBC	The Tonight Show Starring Jimmy Fallon	New York City	"The Art of Letting Go"
December 4, 2013 (Note: Recorded on December 3.)	NBC	Christmas in Rockefeller Center	New York City	"Joy to the World"; "All I Want for Christmas Is You"
December 16, 2013 (Note: Recorded on December 6.)	Hallmark	91st Annual National Christmas Tree Lighting	Washington, D.C.	"All I Want for Christmas Is You"
December 18, 2013	NBC / CTV	Michael Bublé’s 3rd Annual Christmas Special	Vancouver	"All I Want for Christmas Is You" (with Michael Bublé); "Christmas Time Is in the Air Again"
December 31, 2013 (Note: Recorded on December 9.)	NBC	New Year's Eve with Carson Daly	New York City	"The Art of Letting Go"; "Auld Lang Syne" / "Fantasy" (Bad Boy Remix) / "Honey" / "#Beautiful" / "Emotions" / "Always Be My Baby" / "Touch My Body" / "We Belong Together"
February 24, 2014 (Note: Recorded on February 8.)	BET	2014 BET Honors	Washington, D.C.	"You're Mine (Eternal)"
May 16, 2014	NBC	The Today Show	New York City	"Always Be My Baby"; "Touch My Body"; "You Don't Know What to Do" (featuring Wale)
May 24, 2014	NBC	Mariah Carey: At Home in Concert With Matt Lauer	Los Angeles	"We Belong Together"; "Money ($ * / ...)" (featuring Fabolous); "Heavenly (No Ways Tired / Can't Give Up Now)"
May 27, 2014	4Music	2014 World Music Awards	Monaco	"Meteorite"
December 3, 2014	NBC	Christmas in Rockefeller Center	New York City	"All I Want for Christmas Is You"

=== #1 to Infinity era (2015–17) ===
Air date	Network	Program	Location	Performed song(s)
May 17, 2015	ABC	2015 Billboard Music Awards	Paradise	"Vision of Love" / "Infinity"
May 18, 2015	ABC	Jimmy Kimmel Live!	Los Angeles	"Vision of Love" / "Infinity"
May 22, 2015	ABC	Live with Kelly and Michael	Anaheim	"Vision of Love" / "Infinity"
December 19, 2015	Hallmark	Mariah Carey's Merriest Christmas	New York City	"God Rest You Merry, Gentlemen"; "Joy to the World"; "Here Comes Santa Claus (Right Down Santa Claus Lane)" / "Housetop Celebration"; "Hark! The Herald Angels Sing" / "Gloria (In Excelsis Deo)"; "Silent Night"; "Christmas Time Is in the Air Again" (with Babyface); "Oh Santa!"; "All I Want for Christmas Is You"
November 24, 2016	ABC	The Wonderful World of Disney: Magical Holiday Celebration	Anaheim	"All I Want For Christmas Is You"
December 5, 2016 (Note: Recorded on December 2.)	VH1	VH1 Divas Holiday: Unsilent Night	New York City	"All I Want For Christmas Is You"
December 25, 2016 (Note: Recorded on November 24.)	ABC	Disney Parks Magical Christmas Celebration	Anaheim	"All I Want For Christmas Is You"
December 31, 2016	ABC	Dick Clark's New Year's Rockin' Eve 2017	New York City	"Auld Lang Syne (The New Year's Anthem)" / "Emotions"; "We Belong Together"
February 15, 2017	ABC	Jimmy Kimmel Live!	Hollywood	"Vision of Love"; "I Don't" (featuring YG)
September 19, 2017 (Note: Recorded on September 18.)	VH1	2017 VH1 Hip Hop Honors	Hollywood	"Honey (So So Def Mix)" / "Honey (Bad Boy Remix)" (featuring Da Brat, Jermaine Dupri, Jadakiss, Styles P and Mase)
December 31, 2017	ABC	Dick Clark's New Year's Rockin' Eve 2018	New York City	"Vision of Love"; "Hero"

=== Caution era (2018–19) ===
Air date	Network	Program	Location	Performed song(s)
October 7, 2018 (Note: Recorded on September 21.)	The CW	2018 iHeartRadio Music Festival	Paradise	"It's Like That"; "Emotions"; "Honey" / "Shake It Off" / "Obsessed" / "#Beautiful" / "I Know What You Want" / "Fantasy" (Bad Boy Remix); "GTFO"'; "Always Be My Baby"; "We Belong Together"
October 9, 2018	ABC	46th Annual American Music Awards	Los Angeles	"With You"
November 10, 2018	KUKA	Tmall 11.11 Global Shopping Festival	Shanghai	"Emotions"; "Hero"
November 16, 2018	NBC	The Tonight Show Starring Jimmy Fallon	New York City	"The Distance" (featuring Ty Dolla Sign)
November 19, 2018	ABC	Good Morning America	New York City	"With You"
December 16, 2018	The CW	2018 iHeartRadio Jingle Ball	via satellite	"All I Want For Christmas Is You"
May 1, 2019	NBC	2019 Billboard Music Awards	Paradise	"A No No" / "Always Be My Baby" / "Emotions" / "We Belong Together" / "Hero"
October 20, 2019	Dubai TV	Dubai 1 Year To Go Expo 2020	Dubai	"A No No"
December 18, 2019	CBS	The Late Late Show with James Corden	Los Angeles	"Oh Santa!"
December 19, 2019	CBS	The Late Late Show with James Corden	Los Angeles	"Christmas Time Is in the Air Again"
December 20, 2019	CBS	The Late Late Show with James Corden	Los Angeles	"All I Want for Christmas Is You"

=== The Rarities era (2020–21) ===
Air date	Network	Program	Location	Performed song(s)
March 29, 2020	Simulcast	iHeart Living Room Concert for America	New York City	"Always Be My Baby"
April 10, 2020	YouTube	Live at Home Tribute	New York City	"Hero"
May 11, 2020	Simulcast	Rise Up New York!	New York City	"Through the Rain / Make It Happen"
August 19, 2020	ABC	Good Morning America	New York City	"Vision of Love"; "Close My Eyes"
December 1, 2020	Localish	Heroes of New York - A Robin Hood Special	New York City	"'Heroes'" / "Hero" / "Joy to the World"
February 13, 2021	WABC-TV	Live with Kelly and Ryan	New York City	"We Belong Together" (Note: Also dubbed as "Mimi's Late Night Valentine's Mix".)

=== "Big Energy" era (2022-23) ===
Air date	Network	Program	Location	Performed song(s)
June 26, 2022	BET	BET Awards 2022	Los Angeles	"Big Energy" (with Latto)
September 24, 2022	Simulcast	2022 Global Citizen Festival	New York City	"Big Energy" / "Obsessed" / "Honey / Heartbreaker" (mashup); "Always Be My Baby" (not broadcast); "We Belong Together (Remix)" (with Jadakiss and Styles P); "We Belong Together"; "Hero"
November 24, 2022	NBC	2022 Macy's Thanksgiving Day Parade	New York City	"All I Want for Christmas is You"
December 20, 2022 (Note: Recorded on December 13 and 16.)	CBS	Mariah Carey: Merry Christmas To All!	New York City	"Hark! The Herald Angels Sing / Gloria (In Excelsis Deo)"; "Joy to the World"; "Sleigh Ride"; "Christmas (Baby Please Come Home)"; "Silent Night"; "Away in a Manger" (with Monroe Cannon); "Christmas Time is in the Air Again"; "Miss You Most (At Christmas Time)"; "When Christmas Comes"; "O Holy Night"; "Oh Santa!"; "Here Comes Santa Claus (Right Down Santa Claus Lane) / Housetop Celebration" (with Jermaine Dupri and Slick Rick); "Big Energy (Remix)" / "Honey / Heartbreaker" / "My All" / "It's Like That" (with Jermaine Dupri) / "Emotions" / "Make It Happen" / "Fly Like a Bird"; "We Belong Together"; "Hero"; "All I Want for Christmas is You"
November 19, 2023	Billboard's website	2023 Billboard Music Awards	Los Angeles	"All I Want for Christmas Is You"

=== The Celebration of Mimi era (2024) ===
Air date	Network	Program	Location	Performed song(s)
September 22, 2024	Globo/Multishow	Rock In Rio 40 Anos	Rio de Janeiro	"Obsessed"; "Honey / Heartbreaker" (mashup); "Touch My Body"; "Can't Let Go / I'll Be There" (with Trey Lorenz); "Always Be My Baby"; "My All"; "Emotions"; "Dreamlover"; "Hero"; "Fantasy"; "It's Like That"; "Say Somethin'"; "I Know What You Want"; "Shake It Off"; "Don't Forget About Us"; "We Belong Together"; "Fly Like a Bird"; "I Want To Know What Love Is"
October 6, 2024	CBS	American Music Awards 50th Anniversary Special	Los Angeles	"We Belong Together"

=== Here for It All era (2025-26) ===
Air date	Network	Program	Location	Performed song(s)
June 9, 2025	BET	BET Awards 2025	Los Angeles	"Type Dangerous / It's Like That" (with Rakim and Anderson .Paak)
June 15, 2025	YouTube	Capital's Summertime Ball	London	"Fantasy" (Bad Boy Fantasy); "Emotions"; "Hero"; "Always Be My Baby"; "Honey" / "Heartbreaker" (mashup); "Type Dangerous"; "Touch My Body"; "It's Like That"; "We Belong Together"
September 7, 2025	CBS	2025 MTV Video Music Awards	Elmont	"Sugar Sweet" / "Fantasy" (Bad Boy Remix) / "Honey / Heartbreaker" (mashup) / "Obsessed" / "It's Like That / Type Dangerous" (mashup) / "We Belong Together"
September 13, 2025	Globo/Multishow	The Town	São Paulo	"Type Dangerous"; "Emotions"; "Vision of Love"; "Dreamlover"; "Hero"; "Without You"; "Fantasy"; "Always Be My Baby"; "My All"; "Honey / Heartbreaker" (mashup); "Obsessed"; "Touch My Body"; "Sugar Sweet"; "I Know What You Want"; "Shake It Off"; "It's Like That"; "Don't Forget About Us"; "We Belong Together"; "I Want to Know What Love Is"
September 17, 2025	Globo/Multishow	Amazônia Live Hoje e Sempre	Belém	"My All"; "Sugar Sweet"; "Honey" / "Heartbreaker"; "Emotions"; "Always Be My Baby"; "Type Dangerous"; "Touch My Body"; "Don't Forget About Us"; "We Belong Together"; "Hero"
September 20, 2025	Hulu	2025 iHeartRadio Music Festival	Paradise	"Fantasy" (Bad Boy Fantasy); "Honey" / "Heartbreaker" (mashup); "My All"; "Touch My Body"; "Type Dangerous"; "Obsessed"; "Always Be My Baby"; "Sugar Sweet"; "It's Like That"; "We Belong Together"
September 29, 2025	NBC	The Tonight Show Starring Jimmy Fallon	New York City	"Play This Song" (featuring Anderson .Paak)
December 13, 2025	Apple Music	Mariah Carey's Here for It All Holiday Special	Paradise	"Hark! The Herald Angels Sing / Gloria (In Excelsis Deo)"; "Oh Santa!"; "Sleigh Ride"; "Charlie Brown Christmas"; "Christmas (Baby Please Come Home)"; "Christmas Time is in the Air Again"; "Joy to the World"; "Silent Night"; "When Christmas Comes"; "Here Comes Santa Claus (Right Down Santa Claus Lane) / Housetop Celebration"; "Fall in Love at Christmas"; "Jesus I Do"; "In Your Feelings"; "Fantasy" (Bad Boy Fantasy) / "Honey / Heartbreaker" (mashup) / "Emotions" / "Make It Happen" / "Always Be My Baby" / "Hero"; "We Belong Together"; "All I Want for Christmas is You"
December 31, 2025	ABC	Dick Clark's New Year's Rockin' Eve 2026	Paradise	"Obsessed"; "In Your Feelings"; "It's Like That"
February 6, 2026	Simulcast	2026 Winter Olympics opening ceremony	Milan	"Nel blu, dipinto di blu / Nothing Is Impossible"
