= Mariah Carey albums discography =

Albums by American singer-songwriter

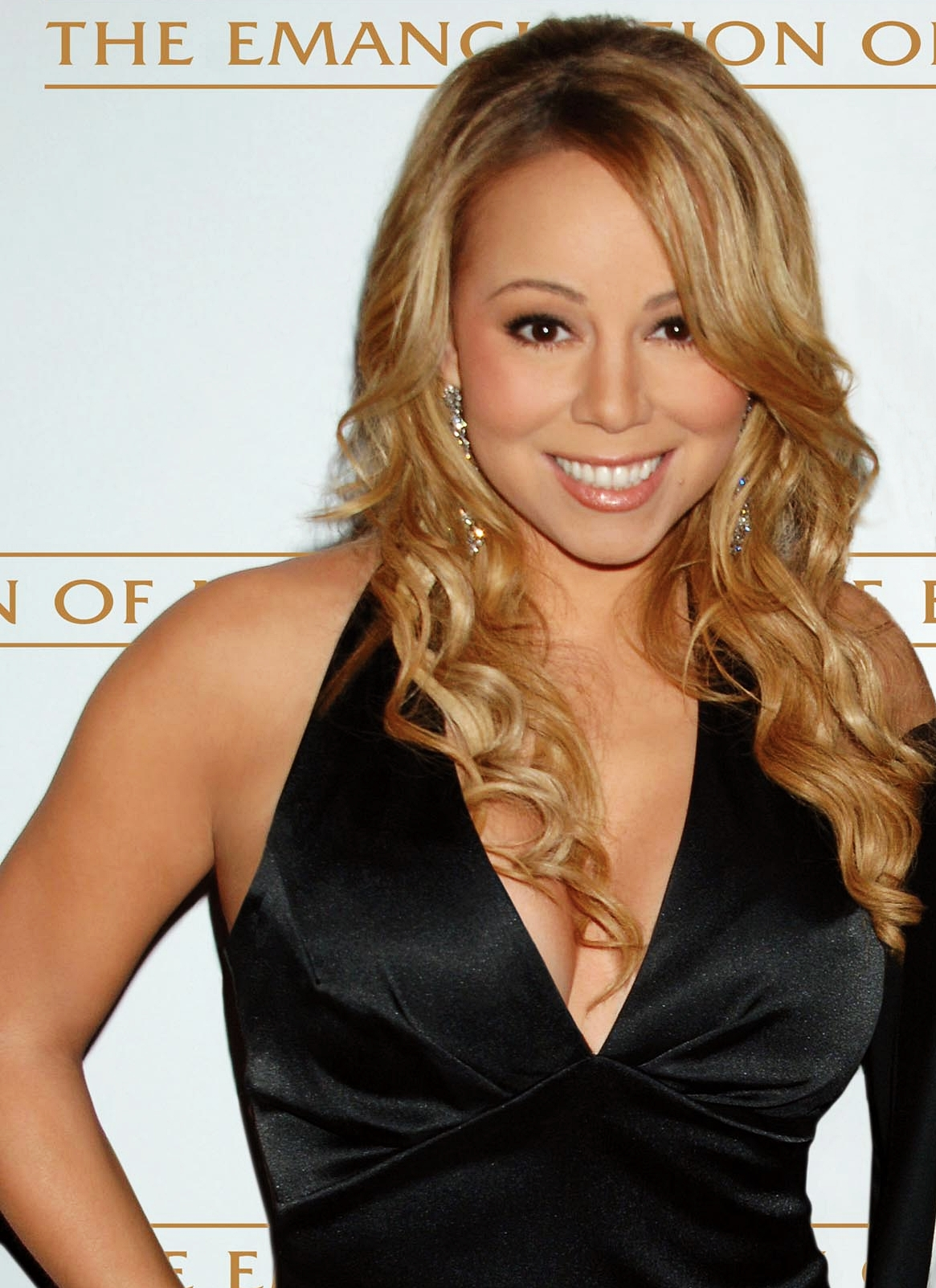
- Carey at the release party of her album The Emancipation of Mimi (2005)
- Studio albums: 16
- Extended plays: 3
- Soundtrack albums: 2
- Compilation albums: 7
- Remix albums: 1
- Anniversary albums: 6

American singer Mariah Carey has released sixteen studio albums, two soundtrack albums, seven compilation albums, three extended plays, one remix album, and six anniversary albums. Carey is one of the best-selling musical artists of all-time, having sold over 220 million records. (Note: As per sources cited by BBC News, amongst others.)

After signing with Columbia Records in the late 1980s, Carey began recording her eponymous debut album (1990). A critical and commercial success, it peaked atop the US Billboard 200 and has received nonupls platinum certification by the Recording Industry Association of America (RIAA). This was followed by Emotions (1991) and her first extended play, MTV Unplugged (1992), both of which peaked within the top four in the US. Carey then released her third studio album Music Box (1993), to commercial success; it topped the charts in multiple countries, went on to become one of the best-selling albums of all time, and was certified diamond by the RIAA. (Note: As per various sources.) This was followed by her first holiday album Merry Christmas (1994), which became one of the best selling holiday albums and was also certified diamond by the RIAA. Throughout the latter half of the 1990s, Carey went on to release a string of successful albums including the diamond certified album, Daydream (1995), the highly acclaimed Butterfly (1997), and her first compilation album, #1's (1998). The lattermost is the best-selling album in Japan by a non-Asian artist. (Note: As per Billboard.) In 1999, Carey released Rainbow which debuted at number two in the US and became her first studio album since 1994 to not reach the top position.

By 2000, Carey parted with Columbia and signed a five-album deal with Virgin Records, releasing her eighth studio album Glitter (2001), which also served as the soundtrack to the film of same name. Both the album and film were commercial and critical failures, primarily due to its controversies and setbacks. After being bought out of Virgin, Carey signed a new deal with Island Def Jam to release her next album, Charmbracelet (2002) to moderate success. During this time, both a second compilation, Greatest Hits (2001) and her first remix album, The Remixes (2003), was released as part of her contract with Columbia. After a musical hiatus, Carey made a comeback with the hip-hop and R&B-inspired album, The Emancipation of Mimi (2005) which received critical and commercial success, debuting atop the Billboard 200, and becoming both the best-selling album of 2005 in the US, and one of the best-selling albums of the 21st century. This was followed by E=MC² (2008) which also debuted atop the chart. She also released the compilation album The Ballads (2008) which debuted at number ten in the US. Carey went on to release Memoirs of an Imperfect Angel (2009), her second holiday album Merry Christmas II You (2010), and Me. I Am Mariah... The Elusive Chanteuse (2014) to varying commercial and critical success, but all debuting top four in the US.

In 2015, Carey signed with Epic Records, a subsidiary of Sony Music Entertainment. She released both the compilation album, #1 to Infinity (2015) and soundtrack to Mariah Carey's All I Want For Christmas Is You (2017). She released her fifteenth studio album, Caution (2018) to critical praise, with critics deeming it another mini-musical comeback following a period of moderate success. In 2020, she released a compilation album The Rarities (2020) featuring unreleased songs, B-sides and live performances. She also released an accompanying soundtrack to her Christmas special Mariah Carey's Magical Christmas Special (2020). During the 2020s, Carey released various anniversary editions for her albums including that for Butterfly, Music Box, Rainbow, Merry Christmas, The Emancipation of Mimi, Daydream and Glitter featuring remixes, demos, live performances and unreleased songs. By 2025, Carey had signed with the media company Gamma and released her sixteenth studio album, Here for It All (2025).

== Studio albums ==
Title	Album details	Peak chart positions										Sales	Certifications
Title	Album details	US	AUS	CAN	FRA	GER	JPN	NL	NZ	SWI	UK	Sales	Certifications
Mariah Carey	Released: June 12, 1990; Label: Columbia (#CK-45202); Formats: LP, cassette, CD	1	6	1	—	24	13	6	4	15	6	US: 6,000,000 (Note: United States sales figures for Mariah Carey as of May 2014.); JPN: 900,000 (Note: Japan sales figures for Mariah Carey as of June 2015.)	RIAA: 9× Platinum; ARIA: 5× Platinum; BPI: Platinum; IFPI SWI: Gold; MC: 7× Platinum; NVPI: Platinum; RIAJ: 3× Platinum; RMNZ: 4× Platinum
Emotions	Released: September 13, 1991 (EUR) (Note: Emotions was released on September 13, 1991, in Europe.); Label: Columbia (#CK-47980); Formats: LP, cassette, CD	4	8	6	—	46	3	9	6	15	4	US: 3,600,000 (Note: United States sales figures for Emotions as of December 2021.); JPN: 1,000,000 (Note: Japan sales figures for Emotions as of November 2002.)	RIAA: 4× Platinum; ARIA: Platinum; BPI: Platinum; IFPI SWI: Gold; MC: 4× Platinum; NVPI: Gold; RIAJ: 4× Platinum; RMNZ: Platinum; SNEP: Gold
Music Box	Released: August 31, 1993; Label: Columbia (#CK-53205); Formats: LP, cassette, CD, MiniDisc	1	1	2	1	1	2	1	2	1	1	US: 8,035,000 (Note: As of December 2021, Music Box has sold 7,300,000 copies in the United States according to Nielsen SoundScan, with an additional 735,000 sold at BMG Music Clubs. Unlike RIAA, Nielsen SoundScan does not count albums sold through clubs like the BMG Music Service, which were significantly popular in the 1990s.); CAN: 600,000 (Note: Canada sales figures for Music Box as of January 1995.); FRA: 1,294,700 (Note: France sales figures for Music Box as of December 2018.); GER: 1,400,000 (Note: Germany sales figures for Music Box as of October 1995.); JPN: 2,300,000 (Note: Japan sales figures for Music Box as of June 2015.); NL: 600,000 (Note: Netherlands sales figures for Music Box as of October 1995.); UK: 1,500,000 (Note: United Kingdom sales figures for Music Box as of 1994.)	RIAA: Diamond; ARIA: 12× Platinum; BPI: 5× Platinum; BVMI: 2× Platinum; IFPI SWI: 4× Platinum; MC: 7× Platinum; NVPI: 6× Platinum; RIAJ: Million; RMNZ: 5× Platinum; SNEP: Diamond
Merry Christmas	Released: October 28, 1994 (VAR); Label: Columbia (#CK-64222); Formats: LP, cassette, CD, MiniDisc	3	2	4	44	2	1	2	10	4	32	US: 5,800,000 (Note: United States sales figures for Merry Christmas as of December 2021.); CAN: 200,000 (Note: Canada sales figures for Merry Christmas as of January 1995.); JPN: 2,800,000 (Note: Japan sales figures for Merry Christmas as of November 2018.); UK: 311,000 (Note: United Kingdom sales figures for Merry Christmas since 2000.)	RIAA: Diamond; ARIA: 7× Platinum; BPI: Platinum; BVMI: Gold; IFPI SWI: Gold; MC: 3× Platinum; NVPI: Platinum; RIAJ: 2× Million; RMNZ: 2× Platinum
Daydream	Released: September 26, 1995; Label: Columbia; Formats: LP, cassette, CD, MiniDisc	1	1	2	2	1	1	1	1	1	1	US: 8,548,000 (Note: As of December 2021, Daydream has sold 7,700,000 copies in the United States according to Nielsen SoundScan, with an additional 848,000 sold at BMG Music Clubs. Unlike RIAA, Nielsen SoundScan does not count albums sold through clubs like the BMG Music Service, which were significantly popular in the 1990s.); FRA: 730,400 (Note: France sales figures for Daydream as of December 2018.); JPN: 2,200,000 (Note: Japan sales figures for Daydream as of June 2015.); UK: 649,000 (Note: United Kingdom sales figures for Daydream as of November 2018.)	RIAA: 11× Platinum (Diamond); ARIA: 5× Platinum; BPI: 2× Platinum; BVMI: Platinum; IFPI SWI: Gold; MC: 7× Platinum; NVPI: Platinum; RIAJ: Million; RMNZ: 5× Platinum; SNEP: 2× Platinum
Butterfly	Released: September 10, 1997; Label: Columbia; Formats: LP, cassette, cassette+CD, CD, MiniDisc	1	1	1	6	7	1	1	4	3	2	US: 3,849,000 (Note: United States sales figures for Butterfly as of December 2021.); JPN: 1,000,000 (Note: Japan sales figures for Butterfly as of September 1997.)	RIAA: 5× Platinum; ARIA: 2× Platinum; BPI: Platinum; IFPI SWI: Gold; MC: 2× Platinum; NVPI: Gold; RIAJ: Million; RMNZ: Platinum; SNEP: 2× Gold
Rainbow	Released: October 27, 1999 (VAR) (Note: Rainbow was released on October 27, 1999, in Australia, Brazil, Canada, Japan, and New Zealand.); Label: Columbia (#63800); Formats: LP, cassette, CD, MiniDisc	2	4	2	1	3	2	4	11	2	8	US: 3,443,000 (Note: As of December 2021, Rainbow has sold 3,000,000 copies in the United States according to Nielsen SoundScan, with an additional 443,000 sold at BMG Music Clubs. Unlike RIAA, Nielsen SoundScan does not count albums sold through clubs like the BMG Music Service, which were significantly popular in the 1990s.); CAN: 300,000 (Note: Canada sales figures for Rainbow as of February 2000.); FRA: 203,028 (Note: France sales figures for Rainbow as of December 2009.); JPN: 422,230 (Note: Japan sales figures for Rainbow as of November 1999.)	RIAA: 3× Platinum; ARIA: Gold; BPI: Gold; BVMI: Platinum; IFPI SWI: Gold; MC: 2× Platinum; NVPI: Gold; RIAJ: 4× Platinum; RMNZ: Platinum; SNEP: Platinum
Glitter	Released: August 18, 2001 (JPN); Label: Virgin; Formats: LP, cassette, CD	7	13	4	5	7	1	12	11	10	10	US: 666,000 (Note: United States sales figures for Glitter as of November 2018.); JPN: 261,900 (Note: Japan sales figures for Glitter as of November 2001.); UK: 55,080 (Note: United Kingdom sales figures for Glitter as of July 2014.)	RIAA: Platinum; RIAJ: Platinum; IFPI SWI: Gold; SNEP: Gold
Charmbracelet	Released: November 20, 2002 (JPN); Label: Island; Formats: LP, cassette, CD	3	42	30	12	32	4	30	—	9	52	US: 1,170,000 (Note: United States sales figures for Charmbracelet as of November 2018.); FRA: 193,587 (Note: France sales figures for Charmbracelet as of December 2009.); JPN: 240,440 (Note: Japan sales figures for Charmbracelet as of November 2003.); UK: 122,010 (Note: United Kingdom sales figures for Charmbracelet as of April 2008.)	RIAA: Platinum; BPI: Gold; IFPI SWI: Gold; MC: Gold; RIAJ: Platinum; SNEP: Gold
The Emancipation of Mimi	Released: March 30, 2005 (JPN); Label: Island; Formats: LP, CD, digital download	1	6	2	4	14	2	8	12	9	7	US: 6,100,000 (Note: United States sales figures for The Emancipation of Mimi as of December 2021.); FRA: 147,719 (Note: France sales figures for The Emancipation of Mimi as of December 2009.); JPN: 259,275 (Note: Japan sales figures for The Emancipation of Mimi as of November 2005.); UK: 671,000 (Note: United Kingdom sales figures for The Emancipation of Mimi as of November 2018.)	RIAA: 7× Platinum; ARIA: Platinum; BPI: 2× Platinum; BVMI: Gold; MC: 3× Platinum; RIAJ: Platinum; RMNZ: 2x Platinum; SNEP: Gold
E=MC²	Released: April 4, 2008 (ITA); Label: Island; Formats: LP, CD, digital download	1	2	1	6	7	7	11	10	5	3	US: 1,300,000 (Note: United States sales figures for this album as of November 2018.); JPN: 146,293 (Note: Japan sales figures for this album as of December 2008.); UK: 136,986 (Note: United Kingdom sales figures for this album as of November 2009.)	RIAA: Platinum; ARIA: Gold; BPI: Gold; MC: Platinum; RIAJ: Gold; RMNZ: Gold
Memoirs of an Imperfect Angel	Released: September 28, 2009 (VAR) (Note: Memoirs of an Imperfect Angel was released on September 22, 2009, in Australia, Brazil, Germany, Japan, and New Zealand.); Label: Island; Formats: LP, CD, digital download	3	6	5	10	27	9	26	25	18	23	US: 555,000 (Note: United States sales figures for Memoirs of an Imperfect Angel as of November 2018.); UK: 80,308 (Note: United Kingdom sales figures for Memoirs of an Imperfect Angel as of November 2010.)	RIAA: Platinum; BPI: Silver; RMNZ: Gold
Merry Christmas II You	Released: November 2, 2010; Label: Island; Formats: CD, digital download, LP	4	27	14	82	77	24	52	—	—	101	US: 587,000 (Note: United States sales figures for Merry Christmas II You as of November 2018.)	RIAA: Gold
Me. I Am Mariah... The Elusive Chanteuse	Released: May 6, 2014 (JPN); Label: Def Jam; Formats: CD, digital download, LP	3	5	8	26	27	25	14	11	16	14	US: 127,000 (Note: United States sales figures for Me. I Am Mariah... The Elusive Chanteuse as of November 2018.); FRA: ~3,700 (Note: France sales figures for Me. I Am Mariah... The Elusive Chanteuse, including its first week (2,600), second week (~700), and third week (~400).)	RMNZ: Gold
Caution	Released: November 16, 2018; Label: Epic; Formats: LP, cassette, CD, digital download	5	15	15	71	67	30	38	40	35	40	US: 43,000 (Note: United States first-week sales figures for Caution as of November 2018.)	
Here for It All	Released: September 26, 2025; Label: Gamma; Formats: LP, cassette, CD, digital download	7	19	—	50	37	33	53	—	18	31	US: 39,000 (Note: United States first-week sales figures for Here for It All as of October 2025.)	
"—" denotes releases that did not chart or was not released

== Extended plays ==
Title	Extended play details	Peak chart positions										Sales	Certifications
Title	Extended play details	US	AUS	CAN	FRA	GER	JPN	NL	NZ	SWI	UK	Sales	Certifications
MTV Unplugged	Released: June 2, 1992; Label: Columbia (#CK-52758); Formats: LP, CD, cassette, MiniDisc	3	7	6	22	30	13	1	1	19	3	US: 2,800,000 (Note: United States sales figures for MTV Unplugged as of December 2021.); JPN: 500,000 (Note: Japan sales figures for MTV Unplugged as of June 2015.)	RIAA: 4× Platinum; ARIA: 2× Platinum; BPI: Gold; IFPI SWI: Gold; MC: Platinum; RMNZ: 2× Platinum; SNEP: 2× Gold
Valentines	Released: January 28, 2000 (Walmart exclusive); Label: Columbia (#A31158); Formats: CD	—	—	—	—	—	—	—	—	—	—		
The Live Debut – 1990	Released: July 17, 2020; Label: Columbia; Formats: Digital download, streaming	— (Note: The Live Debut – 1990 did not enter the Billboard 200, but peaked at number 61 on the Top Current Album Sales chart.)	—	—	—	—	—	—	—	—	—		
"—" denotes releases that did not chart or was not released

== Soundtrack albums ==
Title	Soundtrack album details	Peak chart positions					
Title	Soundtrack album details	US	CAN	IRE	JPN	SWI	UK Dig.
Mariah Carey's All I Want For Christmas Is You (Original Motion Picture Soundtrack)	Released: November 22, 2017 (JPN); Label: Epic; Formats: CD, digital download	—	—	—	—	—	—
Mariah Carey's Magical Christmas Special	Released: December 4, 2020; Label: Legacy, Sony Music; Formats: Digital download, streaming	100	99	47	100	37	18
"—" denotes releases that did not chart or was not released

== Compilation albums ==
Title	Compilation album details	Peak chart positions										Sales	Certifications
Title	Compilation album details	US	AUS	CAN	FRA	GER	JPN	NL	NZ	SWI	UK	Sales	Certifications
#1's	Released: November 16, 1998; Label: Columbia; Formats: LP, cassette, CD, MiniDisc, Super Audio CD	4	6	6	2	10	1	15	13	3	10	US: 4,848,000 (Note: As of December 2021, #1's has sold 3,848,000 copies in the United States according to Nielsen SoundScan, with an additional 1,000,000 sold at BMG Music Clubs. Unlike RIAA, Nielsen SoundScan does not count albums sold through clubs like the BMG Music Service, which were significantly popular in the 1990s.); FRA: 732,400 (Note: France sales figures for #1's as of December 2018.); JPN: 3,600,000 (Note: Japan sales figures #1's as of November 2018.); UK: 768,000 (Note: United Kingdom sales figures for #1's as of November 2018.)	RIAA: 6× Platinum; ARIA: 2× Platinum; BPI: 2× Platinum; BVMI: Gold; MC: 3× Platinum; RIAJ: 3× Million; RMNZ: 2× Platinum; SNEP: 2× Platinum
Greatest Hits (Note: Reissued as The Essential Mariah Carey in 2011 (internationally) with the same tracklist and 2012 (in the United States) with various changes.)	Released: December 4, 2001; Label: Columbia / Virgin; Formats: CD, cassette, MiniDisc	52	47	27	3	36	3	37	11	17	7	US: 1,230,000 (Note: United States sales figures for Greatest Hits as of November 2018.); FRA: 104,350 (Note: France sales figures for Greatest Hits as of December 2009.); JPN: 217,890 (Note: Japan sales figures for Greatest Hits as of November 2002.); UK: 809,000 (Note: United Kingdom sales figures for Greatest Hits as of November 2018.)	RIAA: 2× Platinum; ARIA: 3× Platinum; BPI: 3× Platinum; RIAJ: Platinum; RMNZ: Platinum; SNEP: Gold
The Ballads	Released: October 17, 2008; Label: Columbia / Legacy / Virgin; Formats: CD, digital download	10	79	—	39	—	19	5	19	—	13	US: 395,000 (Note: United States sales figures for The Ballads as of November 2018.)	BPI: Gold
Playlist: The Very Best of Mariah Carey	Released: January 26, 2010; Label: Columbia / Legacy; Formats: CD, digital download	—	—	—	—	—	—	—	—	—	—		
#1 to Infinity	Released: May 15, 2015 (VAR) (Note: #1 to Infinity was released on May 15, 2015, in Australia, Brazil, Germany, Japan, and New Zealand.); Label: Columbia / Epic / Legacy; Formats: LP, CD, digital download	29	18	—	132	—	19	44	25	49	8	US: 86,000 (Note: United States sales figures for #1 to Infinity as of November 2018.)	BPI: Gold
Japan Best	Released: October 17, 2018; Label: Columbia / Legacy; Formats: CD, digital download	—	—	—	—	—	53	—	—	—	—		
The Rarities	Released: October 2, 2020; Label: Columbia / Legacy; Formats: CD, digital download	31	16	80	70	65	24	47	—	29	44		
"—" denotes releases that did not chart or was not released

== Remix albums ==
Title	Remix album details	Peak chart positions								Sales	Certifications
Title	Remix album details	US	AUS	FRA	JPN	NL	NZ	SWI	UK	Sales	Certifications
The Remixes	Released: June 25, 2003 (JPN); Label: Columbia; Formats: Cassette, CD	26	78	60	95	99	36	69	35	US: 289,000 (Note: United States sales figures for The Remixes as of November 2018.)	RIAA: Gold; RMNZ: Gold

== Anniversary albums ==
List of anniversary albums with selected details and chart positions
Title	Reissue details	Peak chart positions		
Title	Reissue details	JPN	SPN	AUS Vinyl
Merry Christmas (Anniversary Deluxe Edition)	Released: November 1, 2019; Label: Columbia; Formats: CD, digital download, streaming	—	—	—
Butterfly: 25th Anniversary Expanded Edition	Released: September 15, 2022; Label: Columbia; Formats: LP, digital download, streaming	—	—	—
Music Box: 30th Anniversary Edition	Released: September 8, 2023; Label: Columbia; Formats: CD, LP, digital download, streaming	45	42	14
Rainbow: 25th Anniversary Expanded Edition	Released: June 14, 2024; Label: Columbia; Formats: LP, digital download, streaming	—	—	—
Merry Christmas: 30th Anniversary Edition	Released: December 6, 2024; Label: Columbia; Formats: LP, digital download, streaming	—	—	—
The Emancipation of Mimi (20th Anniversary Edition)	Released: May 30, 2025; Label: UMG; Formats: LP, digital download, streaming	— (Note: The Emancipation of Mimi (20th Anniversary Edition) did not enter the Oricon Japanese Albums chart, but debuted at number 15 on the Japanese International Albums chart.)	—	—
Daydream (30th Anniversary Edition)	Released: July 17, 2026; Label: Columbia; Formats: CD, LP, digital download, streaming	49	— (Note: Daydream (30th Anniversary Edition) did not enter the Spanish Albums chart but peaked at number 46 on the Spanish Vinyl Albums chart.)	—
Glitter (Deluxe Edition) (Note: While the album is labelled a deluxe, it was marketed in promotion of the soundtrack's twenty fifth anniversary.)	Released: October 30, 2026; Label: Virgin; Formats: CD, LP, digital download, streaming	—	—	—
"—" denotes a recording that did not chart in that territory.

== Box sets ==
List of box sets, with details and notes
Title	Box set details	Notes
12s	Released: 1998 (UK); Label: Sony Urban Division / Columbia; Format: Vinyl	Limited edition 10 record box set of 12" remixes. It peaked at number 46 on the UK Record Mirror Club Chart.; Features "Someday", "There's Got to Be a Way", "Honey", "My All", "Fantasy", "Anytime You Need a Friend" and "Dreamlover".
Mariah Carey / Emotions / Music Box	Released: September 17, 2001; Label: Columbia; Format: CD	Box set of three CDs containing the standard editions of Mariah Carey, Emotions, and Music Box. Released in the US on October 16, 2001. Released in Australia on December 3, 2001. Reissued in the UK on October 14, 2002.
MTV Unplugged / Daydream / Butterfly	Released: September 17, 2001; Label: Columbia; Format: CD	Box set of three CDs containing the standard editions of MTV Unplugged and Daydream, and the Japanese edition of Butterfly. Released in Australia on December 3, 2001. Reissued in the UK on October 14, 2002.
Music Box / Rainbow	Released: September 27, 2004; Label: Sony; Format: CD	Box set of two CDs containing the Australian edition of Music Box and standard edition of Rainbow.
Daydream / Butterfly	Released: September 28, 2007; Label: Columbia; Format: CD	Box set of two CDs containing the standard edition of Daydream and Japanese edition of Butterfly. Released in Australia on October 1, 2007.
Music Box / Butterfly	Released: February 26, 2008; Label: Legacy; Format: CD	Box set of two CDs containing the standard editions of Music Box and Butterfly.
E=MC^{2} Adventure Box	Released: April 16, 2008; Label: Universal; Format: CD+CD-ROM+DVD	Box set of four discs containing an E=MC^{2} CD, an interactive CD-ROM, and two The Adventures of Mimi DVDs.
3CD Collector's Set	Released: September 15, 2009; Label: Island; Format: CD	Box set of three CDs containing the standard edition of Charmbracelet, Ultra Platinum Edition of The Emancipation of Mimi, standard edition of E=MC², and extra space for Memoirs of an Imperfect Angel. It peaked at number 87 on the US Billboard Top R&B/Hip-Hop Albums chart.
Daydream / Mariah Carey	Released: June 4, 2010; Label: Legacy; Format: CD	Box set of two CDs containing the standard editions of Daydream and Mariah Carey.
Emotions / Rainbow / Butterfly	Released: November 9, 2010; Label: SBME Special Markets; Format: CD	Box set of three CDs containing the standard editions of Emotions, Rainbow, and Butterfly.
Charmbracelet / The Emancipation of Mimi / E=MC^{2}	Released: June 22, 2011; Label: Island; Format: CD	Box set of three CDs containing the Japanese edition of Charmbracelet, Ultra Platinum Edition of The Emancipation of Mimi, and Japanese edition of E=MC^{2}.
Charmbracelet / The Emancipation of Mimi	Released: December 5, 2012; Label: Island; Format: CD	Box set of two CDs containing the Japanese edition of Charmbracelet and Ultra Platinum Edition of The Emancipation of Mimi.
E=MC^{2} / Memoirs of an Imperfect Angel	Released: December 5, 2012; Label: Island; Format: CD	Box set of two CDs containing the Japanese edition of E=MC^{2} with the "Touch My Body" music video and the digital edition of Memoirs of an Imperfect Angel.

== See also ==
- Mariah Carey singles discography
- List of best-selling music artists
- List of best-selling music artists in Japan
- List of Billboard Hot 100 chart achievements and milestones
- List of best-selling albums
- List of best-selling albums by women
- List of best-selling albums of the 21st century
- List of best-selling albums in Australia
- List of best-selling albums in Belgium
- List of best-selling albums in Japan
- List of best-selling albums in the United States

== Notes ==
Notes for sources

Notes for certifications and chart positions
