= Number 1 to Infinity (residency) =

2015–17 concert residency by Mariah Carey

#1 to Infinity
- Residency by Mariah Carey
- Location: Paradise, Nevada, U.S.
- Venue: The Colosseum at Caesars Palace
- Associated album: #1 to Infinity
- Start date: May 6, 2015
- End date: July 18, 2017
- Legs: 6
- No. of shows: 50
- Attendance: 177,586 (88%)
- Box office: $23,912,616
- Website: Official website

Mariah Carey concert chronology
- All I Want for Christmas Is You... (2014–19); #1 to Infinity (2015–17); The Sweet Sweet Fantasy Tour (2016)
Mariah Carey concert residency chronology
All I Want for Christmas Is You... (2014-19)	#1 to Infinity (2015–17)	The Butterfly Returns (2018–20)

#1 to Infinity was a concert residency by American singer-songwriter Mariah Carey at The Colosseum at Caesars Palace on the Las Vegas Strip in Paradise, Nevada. It began on May 6, 2015, and concluded on July 18, 2017. The show featured all eighteen of Carey’s US number-one singles in chronological order, closing with her then-new single “Infinity.” Several songs were presented in alternate arrangements, including hip-hop remix versions of “Fantasy,” “Honey,” “Heartbreaker,” and “Thank God I Found You,” while “Someday” was performed in a style closer to its MTV Unplugged rendition. Robin Leach of the Las Vegas Sun praised the opening performance, describing Carey as “the highest-pitched contemporary pop singer of the decade.”

== Background ==
Carey announced the residency during her interview on The Ellen DeGeneres Show. The announcement follows reports that Canadian singer Celine Dion would not be returning to the venue who postponed her shows so that she could continue to take care of her ill husband. Later that spring 2015 Celine announced that she will return to Caesars Palace on August 27, 2015. Speaking of the residency, Carey said "I'm going to do my first ever residency in Vegas at Caesars. This is a special event for me. And again, I have to hope that the fans will enjoy this cause I'm gonna be performing, which was kind of inspired by my album #1's, and this is now the updated version with eighteen of them. I've never done this before." Tickets went on sale January 15, 2015.

== Critical response ==
Robin Leach from the Las Vegas Sun praised the opening performance, writing the singer "is the highest-pitched contemporary pop singer of the decade."

== Set list ==
1. "Vision of Love"
2. "Love Takes Time"
3. "Someday" (with elements of "Ain't 2 Proud 2 Beg")
4. "I Don't Wanna Cry"
5. "Emotions"
6. "I'll Be There" (with Trey Lorenz)
7. "Dreamlover" (with elements from "Juicy")
8. "Hero"
9. "Fantasy" (Bad Boy Remix)
10. "One Sweet Day" (with Daniel Moore and Trey Lorenz)
11. "Always Be My Baby"
12. "Honey" (Bad Boy Remix)
13. "My All"
14. "Heartbreaker" (Desert Storm Remix)
15. "Thank God I Found You"
16. "We Belong Together"
17. "Don't Forget About Us"
18. "Touch My Body"
19. "Infinity"

Notes:

- Starting from September 3rd, "It's Like That" replaced "Infinity".

== Shows ==
Date	Attendance/Capacity	Revenue
Leg 1
May 6, 2015	30,936 / 32,597 (95%)	$4,596,125
May 9, 2015	30,936 / 32,597 (95%)	$4,596,125
May 10, 2015	30,936 / 32,597 (95%)	$4,596,125
May 16, 2015	30,936 / 32,597 (95%)	$4,596,125
May 17, 2015	30,936 / 32,597 (95%)	$4,596,125
May 20, 2015	30,936 / 32,597 (95%)	$4,596,125
May 23, 2015	30,936 / 32,597 (95%)	$4,596,125
May 24, 2015	30,936 / 32,597 (95%)	$4,596,125
Leg 2
July 8, 2015	34,499 / 35,846 (96%)	$5,300,365
July 11, 2015	34,499 / 35,846 (96%)	$5,300,365
July 12, 2015	34,499 / 35,846 (96%)	$5,300,365
July 15, 2015	34,499 / 35,846 (96%)	$5,300,365
July 18, 2015	34,499 / 35,846 (96%)	$5,300,365
July 19, 2015	34,499 / 35,846 (96%)	$5,300,365
July 22, 2015	34,499 / 35,846 (96%)	$5,300,365
July 25, 2015	34,499 / 35,846 (96%)	$5,300,365
July 26, 2015	34,499 / 35,846 (96%)	$5,300,365
Leg 3
February 2, 2016	31,038 / 35,349 (88%)	$4,532,760
February 5, 2016	31,038 / 35,349 (88%)	$4,532,760
February 6, 2016	31,038 / 35,349 (88%)	$4,532,760
February 10, 2016	31,038 / 35,349 (88%)	$4,532,760
February 13, 2016	31,038 / 35,349 (88%)	$4,532,760
February 14, 2016	31,038 / 35,349 (88%)	$4,532,760
February 17, 2016	31,038 / 35,349 (88%)	$4,532,760
February 19, 2016	31,038 / 35,349 (88%)	$4,532,760
February 20, 2016	31,038 / 35,349 (88%)	$4,532,760
Leg 4
June 7, 2016	30,319 / 38,660 (78%)	$3,069,710
June 10, 2016	30,319 / 38,660 (78%)	$3,069,710
June 11, 2016	30,319 / 38,660 (78%)	$3,069,710
June 14, 2016	30,319 / 38,660 (78%)	$3,069,710
June 17, 2016	30,319 / 38,660 (78%)	$3,069,710
June 18, 2016	30,319 / 38,660 (78%)	$3,069,710
June 21, 2016	30,319 / 38,660 (78%)	$3,069,710
June 24, 2016	30,319 / 38,660 (78%)	$3,069,710
June 25, 2016	30,319 / 38,660 (78%)	$3,069,710
Leg 5
August 24, 2016	30,570 / 35,157 (87%)	$3,986,795
August 27, 2016	30,570 / 35,157 (87%)	$3,986,795
August 28, 2016	30,570 / 35,157 (87%)	$3,986,795
August 31, 2016	30,570 / 35,157 (87%)	$3,986,795
September 3, 2016	30,570 / 35,157 (87%)	$3,986,795
September 4, 2016	30,570 / 35,157 (87%)	$3,986,795
September 7, 2016	30,570 / 35,157 (87%)	$3,986,795
September 10, 2016	30,570 / 35,157 (87%)	$3,986,795
September 11, 2016	30,570 / 35,157 (87%)	$3,986,795
Leg 6 (Note: The sixth leg was originally scheduled to run from April 26 to May 18, 2017, but was postponed due to Carey's upcoming joint tour with Lionel Richie.)
July 8, 2017	20,224 / 23,452 (86%)	$2,426,861
July 9, 2017	20,224 / 23,452 (86%)	$2,426,861
July 11, 2017	20,224 / 23,452 (86%)	$2,426,861
July 14, 2017	20,224 / 23,452 (86%)	$2,426,861
July 15, 2017	20,224 / 23,452 (86%)	$2,426,861
July 18, 2017	20,224 / 23,452 (86%)	$2,426,861
Total	177,586 / 201,079 (88%)	$23,912,616

== Cancelled shows ==
Date	Reason
May 13, 2015	Bronchitis

== Personnel ==
- Show director — Ken Ehrlich
- Creative director — Raj Kapoor
- Musical director — James Wright
- Guitar — Tim Stewart
- Drums — Josh Baker
- Bass — Lance Tolbert
- Keyboards — Daniel Moore & Derrieux Edgecombe
- Piano - James "Big Jim" Wright
- Backing vocalists — Trey Lorenz, Maryann Tatum, & Takeytha Johnson
- Choreographers — Tabitha and Napoleon D'umo
- Dancers — Bryan Tanaka, Shaun Walker, G. Madison IV, Joaquim de Santana, Anthony Burrell & Michael Silas
