= Australian Tour 2013 (Mariah Carey) =

2013 concert tour by Mariah Carey

- Promotional tour by Mariah Carey
- Location: Australia, Oceania
- Start date: January 1, 2013
- End date: January 5, 2013
- Legs: 1
- No. of shows: 3

Mariah Carey concert chronology
- Angels Advocate Tour (2009–10); Australian Tour 2013 (2013); The Elusive Chanteuse Show (2014)

Australian Tour 2013 (also known as the Triumphant Tour or the Triumphant Australian Tour by fans and in the media) was an Australian concert tour by American singer-songwriter Mariah Carey.

== Background ==
After the birth of her twins, Moroccan and Mornoe Cannon, with then-husband Nick Cannon in 2011, Carey decided to take a break from music and spend the next two years focused on other projects, such as being the spokesperson for American weight-loss company Jenny Craig and creating a second capsule collection for HSN. In 2012, inspired by the death of fellow singer Whitney Houston and Cannon's hospitalization due to kidney failure, Carey made her grand return to music with "Triumphant (Get 'Em)", featuring American rappers Rick Ross and Meek Mill, originally released as the lead single from her 14th studio album, Me. I Am Mariah... The Elusive Chanteuse, at the time titled The Art of Letting Go. However, negative reviews and low sales reflected on the song not being included in Carey's next effort and the song received very little promotion, as it was then considered as a mere buzz single before the release of "#Beautiful", the actual lead single of Carey's next album.

Still part of her return to music, Carey embarked on a three-date tour across Australia, a region she had not visited since her Butterfly World Tour in 1998. With shows on the Gold Coast, Sydney and Melbourne, the tour received positive reviews among the press and fans of the singer.

== Set list ==
The following set list is obtained from the January 3, 2013 show in Sydney. It is not intended to represent all dates throughout the tour.

1. "Can't Take That Away (Mariah's Theme)" (Triumphant Revival Remix)
2. "Touch My Body"
3. "Shake It Off"
4. "My All" (outro contains elements of the Classic Club Mix)
5. "Emotions"
6. "Always Be My Baby"
7. "I'll Be There" (with Trey Lorenz)
8. "Rock with You" / "Let's Go Crazy" (Interlude) (performed by Trey Lorenz)
9. "Obsessed"
10. "Can't Let Go" / "Love Takes Time"
11. "Don't Forget About Us"
12. "It's Like That" (With elements of "Hollis Crew" and "Sucker M.C.'s" by Run-DMC)
13. "Close My Eyes"
14. "Hero"
15. "Hero" (reprise interlude)

Encore

16. "We Belong Together" (outro contains elements of the Desert Storm Remix)
Notes
- During the Gold Coast concert, "All I Want for Christmas Is You" and "Auld Lang Syne (The New Year's Anthem)" were performed as the encore.
- "Can't Let Go" and "Love Takes Time" were only performed in Sydney.
- During the show in Melbourne, "Obsessed" was not performed and "Fly Like a Bird" replaced "Don't Forget About Us".

== Shows ==
List of concerts, showing date, city, country and venue
Date	City	State	Venue
Australia
January 1, 2013	Gold Coast	Queensland	Gold Coast Convention Centre
January 3, 2013	Sydney	New South Wales	Allphones Arena
January 5, 2013	Melbourne	Victoria	Etihad Stadium
