= Pavarotti & Friends for Guatemala and Kosovo =

Live album by Luciano Pavarotti and various artists
- Released: September 21, 1999
- Recorded: June 1, 1999
- Venue: Parco Novi Sad (Modena, Italy)
- Genre: pop, rock, blues, opera, classical, R&B
- Length: 87:00
- Label: Decca (USA)

Pavarotti & Friends for Guatemala and Kosovo is a live album by Italian opera singer Luciano Pavarotti and a variety guest artists, recorded at a benefit concert of the same name held in Parco Novi Sad, Modena, Italy on 1 June 1999. Each track features a different guest artist, usually singing a song they are associated with, in a duet with Pavarotti. The album is part of the Pavarotti & Friends benefit concert series. Among the attendees was 1992 Nobel Peace Prize winner Rigoberta Menchú Tum.

== Track listing ==
| No. | Title | Writer(s) | Length |
|---|---|---|---|
| 1. | "Hero" (Mariah Carey and Luciano Pavarotti) | Mariah Carey; Walter Afanasieff | 4:40 |
| 2. | "Mamma" (Ricky Martin and Luciano Pavarotti) | Cesare Andrea Bixio; Bruno Cherubini; Harold Barlow; Phil Brito | 2:57 |
| 3. | "Mi Tierra" (Gloria Estefan) | Estéfano; Gloria Estefan | 4:52 |
| 4. | "No Matter What" (Boyzone and Luciano Pavarotti) | Andrew Lloyd Webber; Jim Steinman | 4:51 |
| 5. | "Let the Good Times Roll" (B. B. King) | Sam Theard; Fleecie Moore | 3:40 |
| 6. | "The Magic of Love" (Lionel Richie and Luciano Pavarotti) | Alan Bergman; Lionel Richie; Marilyn Bergman; Walter Afanasieff | 4:41 |
| 7. | "Maria Mari" (Gianni Morandi and Luciano Pavarotti) | Eduardo di Capua; Alfredo Mazzucchi; Vincenzo Russo | 4:20 |
| 8. | "The Thrill Is Gone" (B. B. King and Luciano Pavarotti) | Rick Darnell; Roy Hawkins | 4:44 |
| 9. | "My All" (Mariah Carey) | Carey; Afanasieff | 5:20 |
| 10. | "Hey Man" (Zucchero and B. B. King) | Zucchero; Gino Paoli | 4:45 |
| 11. | "Fiorin Fiorello" (Gloria Estefan and Luciano Pavarotti) | Angelo Mascheroni; Fiorin Fiorello] | 2:12 |
| 12. | "You Can Leave Your Hat On" (Joe Cocker) | Randy Newman | 4:34 |
| 13. | "Il Cielo" (Renato Zero and Luciano Pavarotti) | Renato Zero | 4:17 |
| 14. | "You Needed Me" (Boyzone) | Randy Goodrum | 3:34 |
| 15. | "Tu Che M'Hai Preso Il Cuor" (Laura Pausini and Luciano Pavarotti) | Franz Lehár; Fritz Löhner-Beda; Ludwig Herzer | 3:37 |
| 16. | "You Are So Beautiful" (Joe Cocker, Luciano Pavarotti, and Alex Britti) | Billy Preston; Bruce Fisher | 2:48 |
| 17. | "All Night Long" (Lionel Richie) | Richie | 4:53 |
| 18. | "We Are the World" (all artists) | Richie; Michael Jackson | 5:50 |
| Total length: | | | 87 |

== Charts ==
Chart performance for Pavarotti & Friends for Guatemala and Kosovo
| Chart (1999) | Peak position |
|---|---|
| Australian Albums (ARIA) | 16 |
| Austrian Albums (Ö3 Austria) | 6 |
| Dutch Albums (Album Top 100) | 18 |
| French Albums (SNEP) | 63 |
| German Albums (Offizielle Top 100) | 23 |
| New Zealand Albums (RMNZ) | 30 |
| Swiss Albums (Schweizer Hitparade) | 39 |
