= Number 1 to Infinity =

#1 to Infinity

Greatest hits album by Mariah Carey
- Released: May 18, 2015
- Recorded: 1988–2007; 2015
- Genres: Pop; gospel; R&B
- Length: 79:39
- Labels: Columbia; Epic; Legacy
- Producers: Mariah Carey; Rhett Lawrence; Narada Michael Walden; Ric Wake; Walter Afanasieff; David Cole; Robert Clivillés; Dave Hall; Sean Combs; Stevie J; The Ummah; DJ Clue; Terry Lewis; Jermaine Dupri; Manuel Seal Jr.; Christopher Stewart; Eric Hudson

Mariah Carey chronology
Me. I Am Mariah... The Elusive Chanteuse (2014)	#1 to Infinity (2015)	Caution (2018)

Singles from #1 to Infinity
- 1. "Infinity" Released: April 27, 2015

#1 to Infinity is the second greatest hits album by American singer Mariah Carey. It was released on May 18, 2015 in the United States, by Sony Music. (Note: Released through the Sony-owned Columbia Records, Epic Records and Legacy Recordings labels.) The North American edition of the album compiles Carey's then eighteen US Billboard Hot 100 number-one singles, the highest for a solo artist, (Note: Previously tied with Elvis Presley at eighteen US number ones, Carey has since surpassed this record with her nineteenth number one in 2019.) while the international edition excludes some US number-ones in favor of international number-one hits. Also included in the album is one new recording, "Infinity", which was released as the album's only single on April 27, 2015.

In January 2015, the singer announced that she had signed a residency deal to perform at The Colosseum at the Caesars Palace hotel in Las Vegas in May and July 2015, (later extended into 2016 and 2017) and would perform all of her number ones. As a result, she decided to re-release her first compilation, 1998's #1's, with an updated list of subsequent chart toppers. Carey promoted the album with her #1 to Infinity residency and with live performances at the Billboard Music Awards, Jimmy Kimmel Live! and Live! with Kelly and Michael.

== Background ==
Following the release of Mariah Carey's fourteenth studio album, Me. I Am Mariah… The Elusive Chanteuse, in May 2014, she parted ways with her record label Def Jam Recordings, her publicist Cindi Berger and her manager Jermaine Dupri. She signed a new record contract with L.A. Reid at Epic Records (who co-executively produced Carey's tenth album The Emancipation of Mimi in 2005), sought a new publicist with Chris Chambers of the Chamber Group and hired new managers Stella Bulochnikov and Brian Sher. Writers Shirley Halperin and Andrew Hampp of Billboard attributed Carey's decision to seek a new label and management to the low sales of Me. I Am Mariah… The Elusive Chanteuse, which at a total of 117,000 units since its release, is Carey's lowest selling album in the United States. Carey secured a multi-album record deal with Epic in January 2015, a subsidiary of Sony Music; the lead single, "Infinity", is her first newly recorded material released through Sony since her 1999 studio album Rainbow.

Following the release of Rainbow, Carey left Sony and signed an $80 million, four-album contract with EMI's Virgin Records, wishing to sever all ties with Sony and its chairman, her former husband Tommy Mottola. Halperin and Hampp believe that following a prolonged period of absence from Sony and re-signing with them is a positive situation for Carey: "Doug Morris, current chairman/CEO of Sony Music, brought Carey to Island Def Jam in 2003 when he was running Universal Music Group. Reid, then head of Island Def Jam, oversaw her Mimi-powered 2005 comeback. Joey Arbagey, a collaborator of Carey's during the making of the six-times platinum The Emancipation of Mimi, is now executive vp A&R at Epic." Furthermore, Carey released seven studio albums, a live EP and four compilation albums with Sony, which have sold a total of 54 million units in the US combined. Although Halperin and Hampp note that "Carey's legacy is undisputed, her recent stumbles have not gone unnoticed," with regard to her divorce from Nick Cannon, the low sales of Me. I Am Mariah… The Elusive Chanteuse and its failure to garner a top-ten single on the Billboard Hot 100 and hiring and firing three managers: Dupri, Randy Jackson and Kevin Giles (the last of whom Carey has kept as a consultant). As a result, several record labels were reluctant to offer Carey a contract. According to Billboard, many other critics felt that reuniting with Reid is Carey's best chance of re-establishing herself on the charts.

== Development ==
In January 2015, Carey announced that she would re-release #1's (1998) with an updated selection of songs that had reached number one after #1's: "Heartbreaker" (1999), "Thank God I Found You" (2000), "We Belong Together" (2005), "Don't Forget About Us" (2005) and "Touch My Body" (2008). The North American track listing of #1 to Infinity features Carey's then eighteen US number-one singles on the Billboard Hot 100 and one new recording, "Infinity". Instead of the original studio version of her third number one "Someday", the live recording from her MTV Unplugged EP (1992) is included; Carey explains in the liner notes of #1 to Infinity that she felt the studio version was "overproduced". Also substituted was the original version of her ninth number one "Fantasy", with the Bad Boy Fantasy remix featuring Ol' Dirty Bastard; Carey describes the remix as a "turning point" in her career.

"Thank God I Found You" was omitted from the Japanese track listing, and replaced with "All I Want for Christmas Is You", which remains her best-selling single in the country. "Someday", "I Don't Wanna Cry" and "Thank God I Found You" were omitted from the international track listing, and were replaced with "Without You" (number one in New Zealand, the United Kingdom, and several European territories), "Endless Love" with Luther Vandross (number one in New Zealand) and "Against All Odds" featuring Westlife (number one in the United Kingdom). For the album artwork, Carey launched a social media campaign on April 12, 2015, whereby fans had to share a link to her website in order to reveal the cover which was concealed by a curtain. Using the hashtag "#RevealMariah", the more shares the link received, the quicker the cover was revealed. Fans unlocked the final image a day later on April 13.

== Release and promotion ==
On January 15, 2015, Carey appeared on The Ellen DeGeneres Show to announce that she signed a contract to take up residency at The Colosseum at the Caesars Palace hotel in Las Vegas in May and July 2015; it is called #1 to Infinity. During the interview, Carey confirmed "I'm going to do my first ever residency in Vegas at Caesars." "This is a special event for me. And again, I have to hope that the fans will enjoy this cause I'm gonna be performing, which was kind of inspired by my album #1's, and this is now the updated version with eighteen of them. Hopefully other people will enjoy this. I've never done this before." The confirmation of Carey's residency came after Canadian megastar Celine Dion announced that she had postponed dates of her residency at Caesars Palace to care for her husband, René Angélil, who was suffering from cancer. Aside from singing "Infinity" at her residency, Carey performed a medley of her 1990 debut single "Vision of Love" followed by "Infinity" at the Billboard Music Awards on May 17, 2015; it was her first performance at the ceremony in seventeen years. Andrew Hampp for Billboard described the performance as "octave-leaping" and one of the most memorable of the night. Other promotional appearances included Jimmy Kimmel Live! and Live! with Kelly and Michael. For the latter, Carey wore an Aurora-inspired dress from the Disney film Sleeping Beauty and performed on Main Street, U.S.A. in Disney World. Sony Music released #1 to Infinity on May 18, 2015 in the United States.

"Infinity" was released on April 27, 2015 as the album's only single, and was the only new recording to be included on the track list. It is a mid-tempo R&B song written by Carey, Eric Hudson, Priscilla Renea, Taylor Parks and Ilsey Juber. Lyrically, the song is about Carey freeing herself and emancipation, however many critics speculated that the lyrics were specifically about her separation from her second husband, Nick Cannon. In response, Carey said that the song was not a reflection of her personal life, but even if it was, she would not publicly confirm who it was written about. Critical response to the song was positive, with many critics praising Carey's vocals and her comical songwriting, specifically with regard to the reference about Fritos. "Infinity" reached number 82 on the Billboard Hot 100, becoming her forty-seventh entry since her debut in 1990.

== Reception ==
=== Critical reception ===
Jamieson Cox, from Time, wrote that "if you needed a reminder of just how thoroughly Mariah Carey dominated the 90s, or a refresher on the staggering force of the numbers she’s put up throughout her career, #1 To Infinity will do just fine", but also pointing out that most of the songs were released from 1990 to 1995, just 20% of Carey's entire recording career, as well as criticizing the lack of material released between 2005 and 2015. Nonetheless, he praised the compilation for highlighting "the sheer athleticism and skill that propelled Carey's early work. She took very simple songs—both in terms of arrangements and theme—rooted in pop, gospel, and R&B and turned them into feats of strength, granting them dynamism and drama with a voice that juggled power, clarity, and agility with ease". Andy Kellman of AllMusic gave a positive review of the album, and praised the new track "Infinity" as an "elaborate and mystifying set-up for a display of Carey's whistle range".

=== Commercial performance ===
#1 to Infinity debuted at number 29 on the US Billboard 200 chart on June 6, 2015, selling 15,000 copies in its first week, marking the ninth highest debut of the week and the twentieth best-selling album of the week. It became her twentieth album to make the chart. Her eponymous album had debuted at number 80 twenty-five years prior in 1990 and later became her first of six number-one albums in 1991. #1 to Infinity peaked at number 2 on the Top R&B/Hip-Hop Albums chart and R&B Albums chart, respectively. As of November 2018, the album has sold 86,000 copies in the United States. In the United Kingdom, the album debuted at number 8 on May 24, 2015, remaining on the chart for 5 weeks. On the UK R&B Albums Chart, the compilation reached number 1. Similarly, the album peaked at number 18 on the Australian Albums Chart, but reached number 2 on the Urban Albums Chart.

== Track listing ==
North American edition
No.	Title	Writer(s)	Original album	Length
1.	"Vision of Love"	Mariah Carey; Ben Margulies	Mariah Carey (1990)	3:29
2.	"Love Takes Time"	Carey; Margulies	Mariah Carey	3:49
3.	"Someday" (MTV Unplugged version)	Carey; Margulies	Mariah Carey and MTV Unplugged (1992)	4:01
4.	"I Don't Wanna Cry"	Carey; Narada Michael Walden	Mariah Carey	4:48
5.	"Emotions"	Carey; David Cole; Robert Clivillés	Emotions (1991)	4:08
6.	"I'll Be There" (featuring Trey Lorenz)	Berry Gordy; Bob West; Hal Davis; Willie Hutch	MTV Unplugged (1992)	4:24
7.	"Dreamlover"	Carey; Dave Hall	Music Box (1993)	3:53
8.	"Hero"	Carey; Walter Afanasieff	Music Box	4:17
9.	"Fantasy (Bad Boy Fantasy Remix)" (featuring Ol' Dirty Bastard)	Carey; Hall; Chris Frantz; Tina Weymouth; Adrian Belew; Steven Stanley	Daydream (1995)	4:53
10.	"One Sweet Day" (with Boyz II Men)	Carey; Afanasieff; Michael McCary; Nathan Morris; Wanya Morris; Shawn Stockman	Daydream	4:41
11.	"Always Be My Baby"	Carey; Jermaine Dupri; Manuel Seal Jr.	Daydream	4:18
12.	"Honey"	Carey; Combs; Kamaal Fareed; Steven Jordan; Stephen Hague; Bobby Robinson; Larry Price; Malcolm McLaren	Butterfly (1997)	4:59
13.	"My All"	Carey; Afanasieff	Butterfly	3:51
14.	"Heartbreaker" (featuring Jay-Z)	Carey; Walden; Shawn Carter; Shirley Ellis; Lincoln Chase; Jeffrey Cohen	Rainbow (1999)	4:46
15.	"Thank God I Found You" (featuring Joe and 98 Degrees)	Carey; James Harris III; Terry Lewis	Rainbow	4:17
16.	"We Belong Together"	Carey; Dupri; Seal; Johntá Austin; Darnell Bristol; Kenneth Edmonds; Sidney DeWayne; Bobby Womack; Patrick Moten; Sandra Sully	The Emancipation of Mimi (2005)	3:22
17.	"Don't Forget About Us"	Carey; Dupri; Austin; Bryan-Michael Cox	The Emancipation of Mimi: Ultra Platinum Edition (2005)	3:53
18.	"Touch My Body"	Carey; Crystal Johnson; Christopher "Tricky" Stewart; Terius "The-Dream" Nash	E=MC² (2008)	3:27
19.	"Infinity"	Carey; Eric Hudson; Priscilla Renea; Taylor Parks; Ilsey Juber	Previously unreleased	3:58
Total length:				79:39

Japanese edition
No.	Title	Writer(s)	Producer(s)	Length
15.	"We Belong Together"	Carey; Dupri; Seal; Austin; Bristol; Edmonds; DeWayne; Womack; Moten; Sully	The Emancipation of Mimi (2005)	3:22
16.	"Don't Forget About Us"	Carey; Dupri; Austin; Cox	The Emancipation of Mimi: Ultra Platinum Edition (2005)	3:53
17.	"Touch My Body"	Carey; Johnson; Stewart; Nash	E=MC² (2008)	3:27
18.	"All I Want for Christmas Is You"	Carey; Afanasieff	Merry Christmas (1994)	4:01
19.	"Infinity"	Carey; Hudson; Renea; Parks; Juber	Previously unreleased	3:58
Total length:				79:23

International edition
No.	Title	Writer(s)	Producer(s)	Length
1.	"Vision of Love"	Carey; Margulies	Mariah Carey (1990)	3:29
2.	"Love Takes Time"	Carey; Margulies	Mariah Carey	3:49
3.	"Emotions"	Carey; Cole; Clivillés	Emotions (1991)	4:08
4.	"I'll Be There" (featuring Trey Lorenz)	Gordy; West; Davis; Hutch	MTV Unplugged (1992)	4:24
5.	"Dreamlover"	Carey; Hall	Music Box (1993)	3:53
6.	"Hero"	Carey; Afanasieff	Music Box	4:17
7.	"Without You"	Pete Ham; Tom Evans	Music Box	3:36
8.	"Endless Love" (with Luther Vandross)	Lionel Richie	Songs (1994)	4:20
9.	"Fantasy (Bad Boy Fantasy Remix)" (featuring Ol' Dirty Bastard)	Carey; Hall; Frantz; Weymouth; Belew; Stanley	Daydream (1995)	4:53
10.	"One Sweet Day" (with Boyz II Men)	Carey; Afanasieff; McCary; Morris; Morris; Stockman	Daydream	4:41
11.	"Always Be My Baby"	Carey; Dupri; Seal	Daydream	4:18
12.	"Honey"	Carey; Combs; Fareed; Jordan; Hague; Robinson; Price; McLaren	Butterfly (1997)	4:59
13.	"My All"	Carey; Afanasieff	Butterfly	3:51
14.	"Heartbreaker" (featuring Jay-Z)	Carey; Walden; Carter; Ellis; Chase; Cohen	Rainbow (1999)	4:46
15.	"Against All Odds" (featuring Westlife)	Phil Collins	Rainbow and Coast to Coast (2000)	3:21
16.	"We Belong Together"	Carey; Dupri; Seal; Austin; Bristol; Edmonds; DeWayne; Womack; Moten; Sully	The Emancipation of Mimi (2005)	3:22
17.	"Don't Forget About Us"	Carey; Dupri; Austin; Cox	The Emancipation of Mimi: Ultra Platinum Edition (2005)	3:53
18.	"Touch My Body"	Carey; Johnson; Stewart; Nash	E=MC² (2008)	3:27
19.	"Infinity"	Carey; Hudson; Renea; Parks; Juber	Previously unreleased	3:58
Total length:				77:26

Notes

- "Someday" is included as the live performance version from MTV Unplugged, in place of the original studio recording
- "I'll Be There" featuring Trey Lorenz is a cover, originally performed by The Jackson 5
- "Without You" is a cover, originally performed by Badfinger
- "Endless Love" with Luther Vandross is a cover, originally performed by Lionel Richie and Diana Ross
- "Against All Odds" featuring Westlife is a cover, originally performed by Phil Collins

Sample credits

- "Fantasy"(Bad Boy Fantasy Remix) contains a sample of the Tom Tom Club's song "Genius of Love", written by Chris Frantz, Tina Weymouth, Adrian Belew and Steven Stanley
- "Honey" contains samples of "Hey DJ" performed by The World's Famous Supreme Team, written by Stephen Hague, and "The Body Rock" performed by the Treacherous Three, written by Bobby Robinson, Larry Price and Malcolm McLaren
- "Heartbreaker" contains a sample of "Attack of the Name Game" performed by Stacy Lattisaw, written by Shirley Ellis and Lincoln Chase
- "We Belong Together" contains samples of Bobby Womack's "If You Think You're Lonely Now", written by Bobby Womack, Patrick Moten and Sandra Sully, and The Deele's "Two Occasions", written by Darnell Bristol and Kenneth Edmonds

== Charts ==
=== Weekly charts ===
Chart (2015)	Peak position
Australian Albums (ARIA)	18
Australian Urban Albums (ARIA)	2
Belgian Albums (Ultratop Flanders)	57
Belgian Albums (Ultratop Wallonia)	56
Dutch Albums (Album Top 100)	44
French Albums (SNEP)	132
Greek Albums (IFPI)	12
Hungarian Albums (MAHASZ)	32
Irish Albums (IRMA)	52
Italian Albums (FIMI)	29
Japanese Albums (Oricon)	19
New Zealand Albums (RMNZ)	25
Scottish Albums (Official Charts)	21
South Korean Albums (Circle)	7
South Korean International Albums (Circle)	1
Spanish Albums (Promusicae)	21
Swiss Albums (Schweizer Hitparade)	49
Taiwanese Albums (Five Music)	1
UK Albums (Official Charts)	8
UK R&B Albums (Official Charts)	1
US Billboard 200	29
US Top R&B/Hip-Hop Albums (Billboard)	2

=== Year-end charts ===
Chart (2015)	Position
South Korean International Albums (Circle)	31
US Top R&B/Hip-Hop Albums (Billboard)	82

Chart (2019)	Position
Australian Urban Albums (ARIA)	99

Chart (2020)	Position
Australian Urban Albums (ARIA)	81

== Certifications and sales ==
Region	Certification	Certified units/sales
United Kingdom (BPI)	Gold	100,000^{‡}
United States	—	86,000
^{‡} Sales+streaming figures based on certification alone.

== Release history ==
Country	Date	Format	Label	Ref
Germany	May 15, 2015	CD; digital download	Sony	
United Kingdom	May 15, 2015	Digital download	Sony	
France	May 18, 2015	CD; digital download	Sony	
Spain	May 18, 2015	Digital download	Sony	
United Kingdom	May 18, 2015	CD	Sony	
United States	May 18, 2015	CD; digital download	Epic; Columbia; Legacy	
Italy	May 19, 2015	CD; digital download	Sony	
Spain	May 19, 2015	CD	Sony	
Australia	May 22, 2015	CD; digital download	Sony	
Japan	June 25, 2015	CD	Sony	
United States	August 28, 2015	Vinyl	Epic; Columbia; Legacy	
