= Infinity (Mariah Carey song) =

2015 song

Single by Mariah Carey

from the album #1 to Infinity
- Released: April 27, 2015
- Recorded: 2015
- Studio: Windmark Recording (Santa Monica, CA)
- Genre: R&B
- Length: 4:00
- Label: Epic
- Composer: Mariah Carey
- Lyricists: Mariah Carey; Priscilla Renea; Taylor Parks; Ilsey Juber
- Producers: Mariah Carey; Eric Hudson

Mariah Carey singles chronology
| "You Don't Know What to Do" (2014) | "Infinity" (2015) | "I Don't" (2017) |

Music video
- "Infinity" on YouTube

"Infinity" is a song by American singer Mariah Carey from her sixth compilation album, #1 to Infinity (2015). It was released by Epic Records on April 27, 2015, as the only single from the album. This marked Carey's first release with Sony Music in 15 years, after "Against All Odds (Take a Look at Me Now)" (2000). Carey wrote the song in collaboration with Eric Hudson, Priscilla Renea, Taylor Parks and Ilsey Juber. Carey and Hudson also produced the track. It is an R&B song; the lyrics are about Carey putting herself first and emancipation. However, many critics likened the content to the singer's separation from her then-husband, entertainer Nick Cannon.

Critical response to "Infinity" was positive, with Carey's vocals and humorous songwriting praised. Particular emphasis was placed on the reference to Fritos. In the United States, the song reached number eighty-two on the Billboard Hot 100, and charted on several R&B component charts. In Europe, it peaked at number twenty-seven on the UK R&B Chart, and made the top twenty in Spain and top thirty in Hungary. Carey performed a medley of her 1990 debut single "Vision of Love" with "Infinity" at the 2015 Billboard Music Awards, Live! with Kelly and Michael and Jimmy Kimmel Live!.

== Background ==
"Infinity" is the only new recording to be included on Carey's third greatest hits album, #1 to Infinity (2015). It was written and produced by Carey and Eric Hudson, with additional songwriting from Priscilla Renea, Taylor Parks and Ilsey Juber. Carey unveiled the single's artwork on April 24, 2015, via music identification service Shazam. Mike Wass for Idolator wrote that Carey exudes "overpowering glamor" and "looks typically ravishing in a cleavage-exposing, black ensemble, which she accentuates with huge diamond earrings and fabulous windswept hair."

== Composition and lyrical interpretation ==
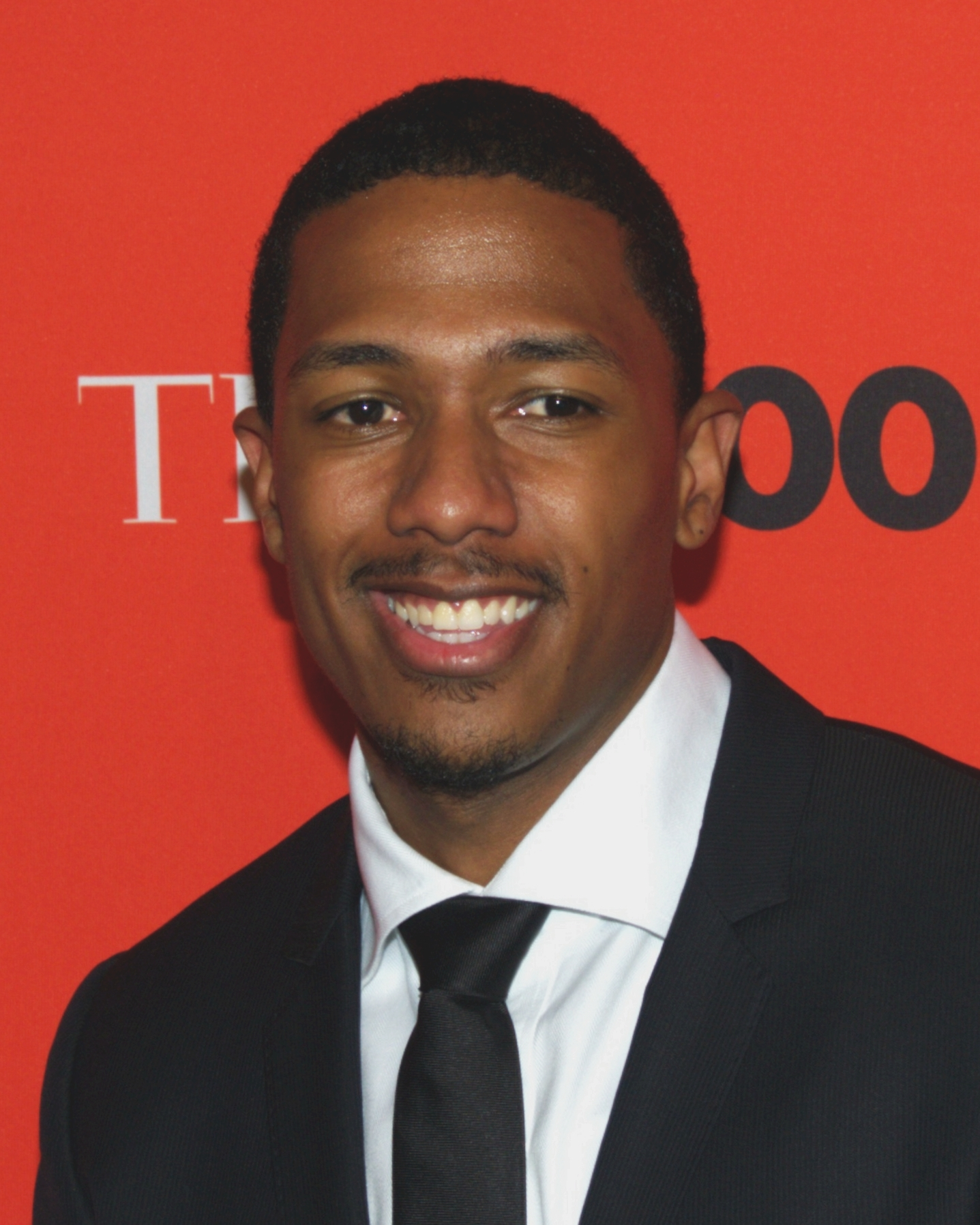
Several critics felt that "Infinity" is about Carey's estranged husband, Nick Cannon.

"Infinity" is a mid-tempo R&B ballad that lasts for a duration of four minutes. Carey belts the lines, "Close the door, lose the key, leave my heart on the mat for me. I was yours eternally, there's an end to infinity", while the songs hook consists of the singer "breathily cooing" the title repeatedly in a descending vocal run. Accompanied by an orchestral synth, string and brass instrumental, Alex Camp of Slant Magazine described "Infinity" as a "welcome throwback to Mariah's early ballads". Andrew Unterberger of Spin likened the intro to the work of Just Blaze, and noted that she finishes the song with a whistle note. According to its lyrics, Carey is putting herself first in order to emancipate herself. As described by Wass, "Infinity" is "distinctly unromantic" and "a kiss-off anthem", writing that it sits somewhere in between two of Carey's previous singles, "Obsessed" (2009) and "You're Mine (Eternal)" (2014).

According to the sheet music published at Musicnotes.com by Universal Music Publishing Group, the song is written in the key of D♭ major with a tempo of 67 beats per minute. The song is written in cut time and follows a chord progression of G♭maj7 – D♭/F – E♭m7, with Carey's vocals spanning three octaves, from D♭_{3} to D♭_{6}.

The lyric "Boy, you actin’ so corny like Fritos" generated a positive response from both critics and fans alike, with MTV News reporting that fans were "freaking" over it. Wass described the inclusion of Fritos as "hilarious", while Camp likened it to a form of product placement. Billboard highlighted the juxtaposition between the chorus, "Close the door/Lose the key/Leave my heart on the mat for me/I was yours eternally/There's an end to infinity" and one of the verses, "Name hold weight like kilos/Boy you actin' so corny like Fritos/Wouldn't have none of that without me, though/Ain't none of my business, it's tea though/Outta ammo, gotta reload/If life was a game you're a free throw/It's nothing that you don't already know," noting that the former is "almost sweet" compared to the latter.

The lyrics aroused suspicion amongst critics that it was referring to Carey's separation from her second husband, Nick Cannon. Daniel D’Addario of Time called "Infinity" a "kiss-off track" directed at Cannon, while Camp wrote that the song will be "better remembered" for its lyrical content aimed at Cannon. A reviewer for Billboard wrote that Carey was possibly "returning to form as the queen of post-heartbreak empowerment", but speculated that the lyrics were most likely about Cannon. Brian Mansfield of USA Today felt that "Infinity" is more of a "kiss-off" than "come-on" track. Unterberger documented that fans would "prognosticate" over whether or not the lyrics pertained to her marriage to Cannon. Emilee Linder for MTV News noticed that Carey appeared to refer to their separation and ongoing co-parenting of their twins, Moroccan and Monroe, in the line "Ain't no being friends/ Ain’t no false pretense/ Ain’t no make amends/ Ain’t no come agains [sic]/ That’s the story, ain’t no happy ends." However, Carey has denied that the lyrics are in any way related to her personal life. When Liz Hernandez of Access Hollywood asked if the lyrics were about her relationship with Cannon, Carey responded by saying that it is about putting herself first, and that even if the lyrics were directed at Cannon, she would not publicly confirm it:

I don't feel like it's my personal life. It's written for all the women, or men, or whoever's gone through any type of relationship. I'm looking at it as the mantra of 'Infinity' is love yourself… loving yourself first to infinity. Then you can love anybody or anything else – your career, your kids, your life, It's like someone emancipating themselves. It's like my re-emancipation of Mimi, I wanted everybody to be able to sing along with [me]. It's a big chorus. I tend to be more private about my personal life anyway, so even if the song were about someone in particular, I would never say that, because that would be like my own private thought.

== Music video ==
The song's accompanying music video was directed by Brett Ratner, a longtime friend of Carey's, and premiered on June 2, 2015. Clips of Carey performing "Infinity" at her Las Vegas residency are intercut with cameos by Tyson Beckford and Jussie Smollett.

== Remix ==
On July 30, 2015, Carey posted a photo on her Instagram account accompanied by Hudson, French Montana and Justin Bieber at recording studio Record Plant in Hollywood. It was reported by TMZ that Carey, Hudson and Montana were working on a remix to "Infinity", and that Bieber "decided to pop in". They played the remix to Bieber, who after expressing his admiration for Carey and the song, decided to contribute some vocals to it. With Carey only performing the hook to the original version of "Infinity", the theme of the remix is that she rejects each of the three featured artists proposals. The song begins with a "laconic rap" by Montana, followed by Carey singing the hook over a "synth-laden chorus", which has a heavier instrumental and bass compared to the original version.

Bieber begins his verse approximately one minute and forty-five seconds in, singing the new lyrics. A reviewer for the Inquisitor praised the collaboration, however Idolator's Christina Lee was critical of the remix, writing "Two of them don’t sound like grown men — and they get the longer verses. French’s loopy rapping and off-key warbling is incoherent. Justin’s attempts to sound pained just sounds whiny." It is the second time that Carey and Bieber have collaborated, the first being when the two re-recorded Carey's 1994 song "All I Want for Christmas Is You" for Bieber's 2011 Christmas album Under the Mistletoe.

== Critical reception ==
Professional ratings
Review scores
| Source | Rating |
|---|---|
| The Irish Times | 2/5 stars |

"Infinity" garnered a positive response from critics, many of whom complimented its throwback feel, as well as Carey's vocals and songwriting. Billboard was complimentary of the song, writing "The throwback-flavored track is a soaring break-up track, complete with sassy lines that shut down the guy she's singing about." Mansfield and Wass both complimented the non sequitur lyrical couplet of "Boy you so corny like Fritos" and "If life was a game you’re a free throw". Mansfield further noted that although "Infinity" does not "recapture the glory" of past singles "Dreamlover" (1993) and "Always Be My Baby" (1995), "it sure gets the sound right," while Wass wrote that "Infinity" showcases Carey's vocal range and "knack for writing hilarious one-liners." D’Addario echoed Wass's sentiment regarding the couplet, writing that the song is "full of Carey’s trademark askew wit". Unterberger concluded his review by writing that no other singer could perform "Infinity" as well as Carey. Although Camp wrote that "Infinity" delivers everything listeners have come to grow accustomed to hearing from Carey, such as whistle notes and "sudden shifts from chest to head voice", she disapproved of the drawn out "non-hook". She further criticised the song's melodic structure, writing that it appeared to cover up Carey's "ailing voice". Despite praising the song, several critics wrote that "Infinity" was unlikely to become her nineteenth number-one on the Billboard Hot 100. In 2020, Billboard ranked it as the 94th greatest song of Carey's career.

== Chart performance ==
In the United States, "Infinity" peaked at number eighty-two on the Billboard Hot 100, with first week sales figures of 26,000 downloads and 1.8 million streams. Her forty-seventh entry on the Hot 100 in twenty-five years following her debut in 1990, it places her ninth amongst artists with the most entries. It further peaked at number forty-five on the Digital Songs chart, number twenty-two on the Adult R&B songs chart, number eleven on both the R&B Songs and the R&B/Hip-Hop Digital Songs charts, and number twenty-eight on the Hot R&B/Hip-Hop Songs chart. In the United Kingdom, the song reached number twenty-seven on the UK R&B Chart, but missed the top one-hundred on the UK Singles Chart, peaking at one-hundred and fifty-four for only one week. In Europe, "Infinity" made the top twenty in Spain and the top thirty in Hungary. Elsewhere, the song peaked at number fifty-two in Sweden and eighty-five in France. The song originally peaked at number sixty-four, and later at forty-three, in Japan.

== Promotion ==
Carey performed a medley of her 1990 debut single "Vision of Love" with "Infinity" as part of its promotion, the first time being at the 2015 Billboard Music Awards on May 17, 2015, her first appearance at the awards show in seventeen years. A video tribute to the singer was shown prior to the singer entering the stage, who was wearing a "sheer and glittery" dress. Andrew Hampp for Billboard noted that it was an "Octave-leaping" performance and one of the most memorable of the night. However Carey's vocals, despite confirming that she had been suffering from bronchitis prior to the performance, garnered a mixed reaction from users on Twitter. D’Addario wrote that she sang "Vision of Love" with "evident confidence", but noted that the key had been lowered. The next day, Carey repeated the medley on Jimmy Kimmel Live!.

The singer performed the medley on Live! with Kelly and Michael on May 22, 2015, during their week-long Disney World take-over. On a platform above the road on Main Street, U.S.A., Carey wore a magenta dress inspired by the one which Disney character Aurora wears in Sleeping Beauty (1959). "Infinity" is included as the closing song on the set-list of her third headlining residency Mariah Carey Number 1's at The Colosseum at the Caesars Palace hotel in Las Vegas.

== Credits and personnel ==
The following credits were adapted from the liner notes of #1 to Infinity, Epic Records.

=== Recording locations ===
- Recording – Windmark Recording Studios, Santa Monica, CA.
- Mixing – Ninja Beat Club, Atlanta, GA.
- Mastering – Powers Mastering, Florida

=== Personnel ===
- Songwriting – Mariah Carey, Priscilla Renea, Taylor Parks, Ilsey Juber, Eric Hudson
- Production – Mariah Carey, Eric Hudson
- Recording – Brian Garten, Julian Prindle, Jordan Stilwell and Tito JustMusic
- Assistant recording – Tristan Bott, Brandon Wood, Matts E. Larson
- Mixing – Phil Tan
- Additional/assistant engineering – Daniela Rivera
- Mastering – Herb Powers
- Programming – Eric Hudson
- Drums – Lawrence Qualls
- Additional drum production – Andrew Clifton
- Live strings/violin – Peter Lee Johnson
- Guitar/Bass Guitar/Piano/Fender Rhodes – Eric Hudson
- Background vocals – Mariah Carey

== Charts ==
Chart performance for "Infinity"
| Chart (2015) | Peak position |
|---|---|
| France (SNEP) | 85 |
| Hong Kong (Metro Radio) | 2 |
| Hungary (Single Top 40) | 25 |
| Japan Hot 100 (Billboard) | 43 |
| South Korea International (Circle) | 12 |
| Spain (Promusicae) | 18 |
| Sweden (DigiListan) | 52 |
| UK Singles (OCC) | 154 |
| UK Hip Hop/R&B (Official Charts) | 27 |
| US Billboard Hot 100 | 82 |
| US Hot R&B/Hip-Hop Songs (Billboard) | 28 |
