= I'll Be There (Mariah Carey recording) =

Single by Mariah Carey featuring Trey Lorenz

from the album MTV Unplugged
- B-side: "So Blessed"; "Vanishing"; "All in Your Mind"; "If It's Over"
- Released: May 26, 1992
- Recorded: March 16, 1992
- Venue: Kaufman Astoria Studios
- Genre: Pop; R&B; soul
- Length: 4:42 (original album version); 4:24 (video edit)
- Label: Columbia
- Songwriters: Berry Gordy; Bob West; Willie Hutch; Hal Davis
- Producers: Mariah Carey; Walter Afanasieff

Mariah Carey singles chronology
| "Make It Happen" (1992) | "I'll Be There" (1992) | "If It's Over" (1992) |

Trey Lorenz singles chronology
| "I'll Be There" (1992) | "Someone to Hold" (1992) |

Live video
- "I'll Be There" on YouTube

"I'll Be There" is a song recorded by American singer-songwriter Mariah Carey. It is a cover of the original song, recorded by the Jackson 5. Carey included the song as a last-minute addition to her MTV Unplugged setlist, taped on March 16, 1992. It was released on May 26, 1992, as the lead single from Carey's live extended play MTV Unplugged. The recording is re-imagined as a romantic duet with Carey singing Michael Jackson's lines and her backing singer Trey Lorenz singing Jermaine Jackson's lines. The "I'll Be There" music video, directed by Larry Jordan, was compiled from footage of Carey's MTV Unplugged appearance.

Co-produced by Carey and Walter Afanasieff, "I'll Be There" reached number one on the US Billboard Hot 100, becoming Carey's sixth chart-topper. The song also became her most successful single internationally at the time, peaking at number one in Canada, the Netherlands and New Zealand, as well as reaching the top five in the United Kingdom and Ireland, the top ten in Australia, and the top twenty in most markets across Europe. "I'll Be There" received nominations for the Grammy Awards for Best R&B Performance by a Duo or Group with Vocals and Best R&B Song. Regularly, the song has been featured on Carey's catalog albums included on #1's (1998), Greatest Hits (2001), The Ballads (2008), The Essential Mariah Carey (2011), and #1 to Infinity (2015).

Wanya Morris of Boyz II Men performed the song with Carey in 1995 in the concert home video, Fantasy: Mariah Carey at Madison Square Garden. During Michael Jackson's memorial service on July 7, 2009, Carey and Lorenz sang their rendition of the song in tribute to Jackson 17 years after their first performance together.

== Release ==
Carey had included "I'll Be There" as a last-minute addition to her MTV Unplugged setlist, rehearsing it a few times before the night of the show, after she had been informed that most acts on the show commonly perform at least one cover. The recording were produced by Carey and Walter Afanasieff, who played the piano for the performance. The song is composed in common time and has a moderate tempo of 84 beats per minute. Carey's vocal range spans two octaves and three semitones from the low note of D_{3} to the high note of F_{5}. The MTV Unplugged special aired on May 20, 1992, and was a notable success. Carey's label, Columbia Records, received many requests to release "I'll Be There" as a single, which had not been planned. A radio edit of the song was created which removed dialogue portions of the performance, and "I'll Be There" was released as a single. In the US, the song was issued with "So Blessed" as a B-side; in the United Kingdom, the "I'll Be There" single included the live version of "Vision of Love", and the album versions of "If It's Over" and "All in Your Mind".

== Critical reception ==
Professional ratings
Review scores
| Source | Rating |
|---|---|
| Accrington Observer | 1/5 stars |
| Entertainment Weekly | B+ |
| Stereogum | 6/10 |

AllMusic editor Shawn M. Haney highlighted it and wrote, "...the power and esteem of these tales lift to new heights and remain at a peak with the breathtaking, moment-making performance of "I'll Be There"." Larry Flick from Billboard magazine stated that Carey "delivers an astonishingly restrained and soulful rendition". He added, "She is complemented by rich vocal support from Epic newcomer Trey Lorenz." An editor from Entertainment Weekly wrote that Mariah turned this song into a "killer duet." In 2018, the magazine called it a "revelation", noting that she "made it utterly her own."

== Chart performance ==
After the underperformance of "Make It Happen" compared to her previous singles, "I'll Be There" was a return to form for Carey: it became her sixth number-one on the US Billboard Hot 100 and allayed any concerns her record label had about her career in decline. "I'll Be There" was the number-one song on the Hot 100 for two weeks, from June 13, 1992, to June 27. It replaced "Jump" by Kris Kross, and was itself replaced by "Baby Got Back" by Sir Mix-a-Lot. It became number-one on the US Hot Adult Contemporary Tracks. It is the only single released from the MTV Unplugged series that hit number-one and remains as Carey's only single from her nineteen US chart-toppers not to be written by herself. It was also the eighth song in history to top the Billboard Hot 100 twice by different artists, as well as the eighth and, as of 2026, final live number-one song.

"I'll Be There" was Carey's breakthrough hit outside North America, becoming her most successful single in numerous markets. It topped the Canadian Singles Chart for two weeks, and became her first number-one single in the Netherlands for three weeks, and her second in New Zealand for five weeks. It also became her biggest hit at the time in the United Kingdom (where it hit number 2) and Australia (where it reached number 9). It peaked inside the top 20 in most markets across Europe, where Carey's success had previously been limited.

The song has sold a total of 345,000 copies in the UK.

== Track listing ==
- Worldwide CD single
1. "I'll Be There"
2. "So Blessed"
- European CD maxi-single
1. "I'll Be There"
2. "So Blessed"
3. "Vanishing"
- UK CD maxi-single
1. "I'll Be There"
2. "Can't Let Go"
3. "Love Takes Time"
4. "So Blessed"
- UK CD maxi-single (picture disc)
1. "I'll Be There"
2. "Vision of Love" (live)
3. "If It's Over"
4. "All in Your Mind"

== Charts ==
=== Weekly charts ===
| Chart (1992–1993) | Peak position |
|---|---|
| Australia (ARIA) | 9 |
| Belgium (Ultratop 50 Flanders) | 4 |
| Canada Retail Singles (The Record) | 1 |
| Canada Contemporary Hit Radio (The Record) | 1 |
| Canada Top Singles (RPM) | 1 |
| Canada Adult Contemporary (RPM) | 1 |
| Europe (Eurochart Hot 100) | 8 |
| Europe (European Dance Radio) | 5 |
| Europe (European Hit Radio) | 3 |
| France (SNEP) | 16 |
| Germany (GfK) | 33 |
| Iceland (Íslenski Listinn Topp 20) | 8 |
| Ireland (IRMA) | 3 |
| Israel (Israeli Singles Chart) | 10 |
| Netherlands (Dutch Top 40) | 1 |
| Netherlands (Single Top 100) | 1 |
| New Zealand (Recorded Music NZ) | 1 |
| Norway (VG-lista) | 10 |
| Panama (UPI) | 6 |
| South Africa Airplay (EMA) | 1 |
| Sweden (Sverigetopplistan) | 26 |
| Switzerland (Schweizer Hitparade) | 20 |
| UK Singles (Official Charts) | 2 |
| UK Singles (MRIB) | 1 |
| UK Airplay (Music Week) | 2 |
| US Hot 100 Singles (Billboard) | 1 |
| US Hot Adult Contemporary (Billboard) | 1 |
| US Hot R&B Singles (Billboard) | 11 |
| US Cash Box Top 100 | 1 |
| US Top 100 R&B Singles (Cash Box) | 1 |
| US Adult Contemporary (Gavin Report) | 1 |
| US Top 40 (Gavin Report) | 1 |
| US Top 40/Urban Crossover (Gavin Report) | 1 |
| US Urban Contemporary (Gavin Report) | 2 |
| US Adult Contemporary (Radio & Records) | 1 |
| US Contemporary Hit Radio (Radio & Records) | 1 |
| US Urban Contemporary (Radio & Records) | 4 |

| Chart (2002) | Peak position |
|---|---|
| US Hot Singles Sales (Billboard) | 54 |

=== Year-end charts ===
| Chart (1992) | Position |
|---|---|
| Australia (ARIA) | 37 |
| Belgium (Ultratop) | 25 |
| Brazil (Crowley) | 25 |
| Canada Retail Singles (The Record) | 27 |
| Canada Top Singles (RPM) | 7 |
| Canada Adult Contemporary (RPM) | 15 |
| Europe (Eurochart Hot 100) | 67 |
| Europe (European Hit Radio) | 15 |
| Netherlands (Dutch Top 40) | 12 |
| Netherlands (Single Top 100) | 10 |
| New Zealand (RIANZ) | 5 |
| UK Singles (OCC) | 40 |
| UK Singles (MRIB) | 28 |
| UK Airplay (Music Week) | 43 |
| US Billboard Hot 100 | 16 |
| US Adult Contemporary (Billboard) | 25 |
| US Cash Box Top 100 | 14 |
| US Adult Contemporary (Gavin Report) | 37 |
| US Adult Contemporary (Radio & Records) | 19 |
| US Contemporary Hit Radio (Radio & Records) | 4 |
| US Top 40 (Gavin Report) | 8 |
| US Urban (Radio & Records) | 87 |
| US Urban Contemporary (Gavin Report) | 58 |

=== Decade-end charts ===
| Chart (1990–1999) | Position |
|---|---|
| Canada (Nielsen SoundScan) | 86 |
| US Billboard Hot 100 | 96 |

== Certifications and sales ==
| Region | Certification | Certified units/sales |
|---|---|---|
| Australia (ARIA) | Platinum | 70,000^{‡} |
| New Zealand (RMNZ) | Gold | 5,000^{*} |
| United Kingdom | — | 345,000 |
| United States (RIAA) | Gold | 500,000^{‡} |
^{*} Sales figures based on certification alone.^{‡} Sales+streaming figures based on certification alone.

== Release history ==
Release dates and formats for "I'll Be There"
| Region | Date | Format(s) | Label(s) | Ref. |
|---|---|---|---|---|
| United States | May 26, 1992 | 7-inch vinyl; cassette | Columbia | |
| Japan | May 28, 1992 | Mini CD | Sony Music Japan | |
| United Kingdom | June 15, 1992 | 7-inch vinyl; cassette; CD | Columbia | |
