= Emotions (Mariah Carey album) =

1991 studio album by Mariah Carey

Studio album by Mariah Carey
- Released: September 17, 1991
- Recorded: 1991
- Studios: Skywalker Ranch (Marin County, California); The Plant (Sausalito, California); Right Track; Axis; Skyline; Battery; Electric Lady; Giant Recording (New York City)
- Genres: R&B; dance-pop
- Length: 47:02
- Label: Columbia
- Producers: Mariah Carey; Walter Afanasieff; David Cole; Robert Clivillés

Mariah Carey chronology
Mariah Carey (1990)	Emotions (1991)	MTV Unplugged (1992)

Singles from Emotions
- 1. "Emotions" Released: August 1991; 2. "Can't Let Go" Released: November 1991; 3. "Make It Happen" Released: February 1992

Emotions is the second studio album by American singer-songwriter Mariah Carey. It was released on September 17, 1991, through Columbia Records. Emotions is an R&B and dance-pop album with influences from soul, jazz, gospel, and disco music; drums, electric guitars, keyboards, piano, and synthesizers characterize the compositions. Ranging from upbeat dance tracks to slow, sentimental ballads, the songs explore love and heartbreak and, to a lesser extent, perseverance and grief.

Carey began work on Emotions in 1990 and wrote the lyrics to every track. She had greater control over the creative process compared to her debut studio album, Mariah Carey (1990), where seven out of eleven songs were co-composed with Ben Margulies. With Emotions, she was able to work with a larger variety of artists; she principally composed the ballads with Walter Afanasieff—with whom she had worked on Mariah Carey—and the dance tracks with David Cole and Robert Clivillés, who formed the production duo C+C Music Factory. Carey composed one song, "If It's Over", with Carole King.

Carey promoted Emotions through appearances on television and at award shows. It did not receive as much marketing as Mariah Carey. Three singles supported the album. The lead single, "Emotions", topped the Billboard Hot 100 for three weeks, making Carey the first artist whose first five singles reached number one. The subsequent singles "Can't Let Go" and "Make It Happen" broke the streak, respectively peaking at numbers two and five. The album reached the top ten of charts in Australia, Canada, Denmark, Japan, the Netherlands, New Zealand, Norway, the United Kingdom, and the United States.

Music critics were ambivalent towards Emotions on release. Some reviewers praised its production and Carey's vocals; others deemed her songwriting dull and felt she was overusing her whistle register. Retrospective reviews of Emotions have been more positive. At the 34th Annual Grammy Awards, the album earned Carey two nominations: Producer of the Year and Best Female Pop Vocal Performance for "Emotions". The album has been certified platinum or higher across the Americas, Europe, and the Asia–Pacific region; it has sold over eight million copies worldwide.

== Background ==
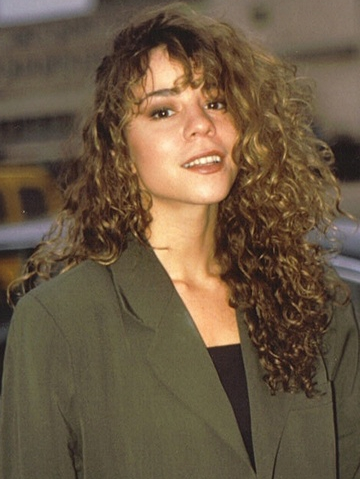
Carey in 1990

In 1988, Mariah Carey went to a recording industry gala where Tommy Mottola, the head of Columbia Records at the time, was in attendance. There, she handed him her demo tape, which he listened to on the drive home. Impressed by the music, Mottola returned to the party searching for Carey, only to learn she had already gone. After days of looking for her, he officially signed her to Columbia Records.

After signing to Columbia, Carey released her debut studio album, Mariah Carey, in 1990. Her vocals received widespread praise, but some critics felt the album lacked a distinct musical identity. The album topped the US Billboard 200 for eleven consecutive weeks and had sold over 15 million copies worldwide as of 2017. Its four singles eligible for the Billboard Hot 100 Singles chart—"Vision of Love", "Love Takes Time", "Someday", and "I Don't Wanna Cry"—made Carey the second act to top the chart with her first four releases. She also earned five nominations at the 33rd Annual Grammy Awards and won Best New Artist and Best Female Pop Vocal Performance for "Vision of Love".

By 1991, Carey had become a prominent figure in the music industry. Following the success of her debut album, fans speculated about a possible world tour. She was hesitant, believing the vocally demanding nature of her songs would prevent her from delivering a good performance. Instead, she chose to focus on creating her next album.

== Writing and recording ==
Carey began writing Emotions, her second studio album, after releasing "Vision of Love". Recording started after she finished the previous album. For Emotions, executives at Columbia granted her greater control over the creative process, compared to Mariah Carey where she had little sway. In between albums, she had a falling-out with collaborator Ben Margulies, with whom she composed seven of the eleven tracks on Mariah Carey. The conflict arose reportedly due to a contract she had signed with Margulies before joining Columbia. Their agreement entitled him to nearly half of the income Carey earned from Mariah Carey as a recording artist, rather than merely a share of the publishing royalties from the songs they had co-written. Due to the end of Margulies and Carey's work relationship, Carey was to recruit new songwriters and musicians for Emotions. President Don Ienner believed that she earned this artistic control, saying that she had a good sense of "what's right and wrong" when creating an album.

Carey continued to work with Walter Afanasieff, who produced "Love Takes Time" for Mariah Carey, because she felt serene and creative in his presence. They began writing for Emotions in late 1990, months before recording had begun. Their writing process usually involved Afanasieff first developing an idea, which he played on the keyboard as either a chord progression or a short instrumental line. This would inspire Carey to create vocal melodies or lyrics, and Afanasieff would play instruments along to what she was singing. These sessions took place during Afanasieff's free time, as he had also been working as a producer on Michael Bolton's Time, Love & Tenderness (1991). For Emotions, he would co-produce "And You Don't Remember", "Can't Let Go", "So Blessed", "Till the End of Time", "If It's Over", and "The Wind", and co-compose all but the latter two. "The Wind", the only track on the album not composed by Carey, was originally a jazz instrumental composed by pianist Russ Freeman in the 1950s. Afanasieff discovered it on a record by pianist Keith Jarrett, and Carey was inspired to create a song out of it.

Mottola suggested enlisting Robert Clivillés and David Cole of the dance music production duo C+C Music Factory, since combining slow ballads with uptempo dance tracks on albums proved successful in contemporary music at the time. They arrived at writing sessions with a collection of grooves, playing them for Carey to determine which could work as the base for songs. One decision Clivillés and Cole made early on was not to focus overly on Carey's upper vocal range. They acknowledged it would be difficult to ignore it completely, but wanted to focus on her vocal ability without risking criticism that her range was merely a gimmick. Their collaborations produced four songs: "Emotions", "Make It Happen", "You're So Cold", and "To Be Around You". Cole played the keyboards, and Clivillés handled the drums. All four songs were composed by Carey and Cole; Clivillés helped them compose "Emotions" and "Make It Happen".

Carey also worked with singer-songwriter Carole King for Emotions. Initially, King wanted Carey to record a rendition of Aretha Franklin's "(You Make Me Feel Like) A Natural Woman" (1967), co-written by King and Gerry Goffin. Carey declined, feeling that Franklin's version was "untouchable" and that there was nothing new she could add to it. Instead, what arose from Carey and King's time in the studio was the sentimental ballad "If It's Over", which Carey described as a "true collaboration". The two exchanged musical ideas and Carey conceived lyrics until they formed what both deemed a "wonderful" song. By March 1991, Carey had an array of songs that she and Afanasieff played for the Columbia executives to decide which ones would be included on Emotions.

== Composition ==
=== Music and themes ===
"Emotions"
The final chorus of "Emotions" features Carey's signature use of the whistle register.

"Can't Let Go"
"Can't Let Go" sees Carey singing in a lower register and with husky vocals.

Emotions is predominantly an R&B and dance-pop album that incorporates elements of soul, gospel, disco, and jazz. Carey wanted the album to draw heavily from Motown and gospel music, which her older sister and brother frequently played for her during her childhood. Compared to Mariah Carey, Emotions features a leaner production, eschewing the arrangements that some critics, and Carey herself, deemed overblown or overproduced. Most of the instrumentation on Emotions is synthesized; keyboards, drums, piano, and electric guitar feature prominently. It consists of two different styles of songs: slow, soulful ballads and upbeat dance tracks.

The songs on Emotions were made to be radio-friendly and commercially accessible. Love and romance are recurring themes; Carey explained that writing about love helps her connect with listeners and makes her emotions easier to convey, even if her inspiration stems from real-life experiences that are not always romantic. "Emotions", "To Be Around You", "So Blessed", and "Till the End of Time" explore the narrator's feelings of love and joy when she is with her partner. (Note: Cited to multiple sources:) "And You Don't Remember", "Can't Let Go", "You're So Cold", and "If It's Over" portray Carey as a heartbroken lover or explore the deterioration of a romantic relationship. Emotions also contains two songs that depart from these themes and were inspired by Carey's real-life experiences: "The Wind" reflects on the grief of losing a loved one, and "Make It Happen" focuses on perseverance and faith in the face of adversity.

Carey's vocals on Emotions were influenced by those of Aretha Franklin, Stevie Wonder, Minnie Riperton, and Gladys Knight. When recording the album, she and her collaborators focused more on her voice than on production, in contrast to Mariah Carey; Dennis Hunt noted in the Los Angeles Times that Emotions relies more on conventional singing and less on vocal "showboating" than on her debut album. On the title track, "Emotions", Carey sings in a high coloratura register and employs her whistle register extensively. She reaches a G_{7}—her highest recorded note. Music critic Phyllis T. Garland wrote that no singer since Minnie Riperton had been able to reach such high notes. Carey uses her whistle register at times on "Can't Let Go" and "If It's Over", but sings primarily in a lower register on those songs. (Note: Cited to multiple sources:)

=== Songs ===
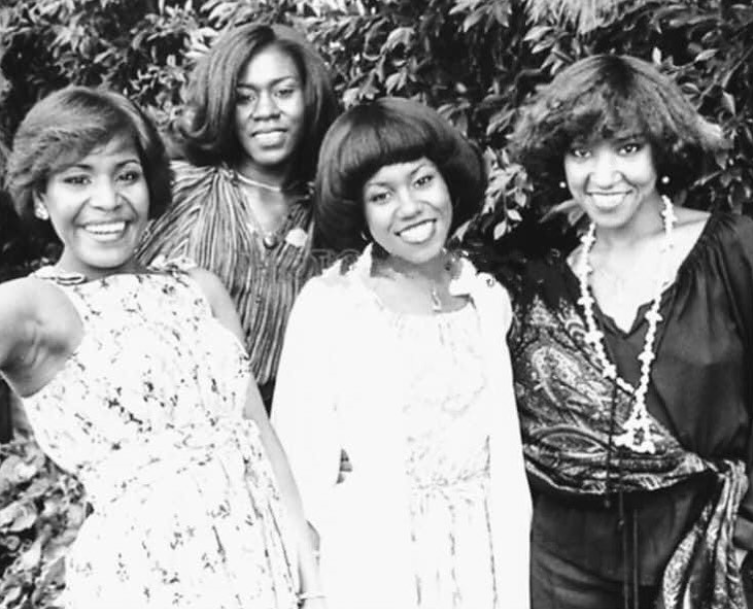
The album's title track pays homage to the Emotions, whose 1977 single "Best of My Love" was its musical inspiration.

The album opens with "Emotions", which has been described as a post-disco, R&B, and gospel song. Clivillés and Cole reworked the song into a house track for its club remix on the 12-inch vinyl single, incorporating an extended gospel-style introduction. "Emotions" describes the overwhelming feelings of love the narrator experiences when she is with her lover. Carey's vocal performance features melismatic runs and explores her lower register during the bridge before ascending into her whistle register. Near the end of the song, she performs a series of sustained whistle notes. "Emotions" was influenced by "Best of My Love", a 1977 single produced by Maurice White of Earth, Wind & Fire and performed by vocal group the Emotions, who also inspired the title of Carey's song.

"And You Don't Remember", the second track on Emotions, incorporates prominent gospel influences through its organ chord progression, minimal production, and soft church choir vocals. Biographer Chris Nickson stated that the song, along with "Emotions", was created to evoke the musical styles of the 1960s and 1970s. A soulful sentimental ballad, "And You Don't Remember" recounts the narrator's heartbreak after being deceived and abandoned by a former lover, who made empty promises before moving on to another relationship. Influenced by 1950s balladry, third track "Can't Let Go" is an R&B and pop slow jam that features synthesizers and drum programming. It opens with faint notes from Carey in the whistle register, and she remains in a low vocal register with a breathy delivery before concluding with a whistle note at the end of the song. In the lyrics, the narrator laments the end of a relationship.

Nickson compared the restrained dance beat of "Make It Happen" to Motown music. Its lyrics are autobiographical, addressing the struggles Carey faced before being signed to Columbia and how her faith in God kept her going through it all. Its chorus incorporates background vocals sung by Carey, Trey Lorenz and Patrique McMillan. The fifth track, "If It's Over", is a ballad infused with soul and gospel blues. It was influenced by 1960s gospel music and critics compared its sound to the music that brought Franklin great success. The song's backing vocals are similar to those of a church choir. The instrumentation includes both baritone and tenor saxophone, tambourine, electric organ, trombone, and trumpet. The song's lyrics see the narrator pleading with a lover to let her go if their romance has deteriorated.

"You're So Cold" is an upbeat dance track featuring piano that gives the song a house-influenced sound. It opens with a piano tremolo, followed by one of the lowest notes Carey recorded during her early career. Its lyrics depict the narrator questioning why she loves a man who treats her poorly and calling him out for being "so cold". "You're So Cold" was initially intended to be the lead single from Emotions, but was eventually swapped for the title track. "So Blessed", the album's seventh track, is a soft gospel-influenced torch song about love that evokes 1950s and 1960s pop balladry; Carey sings over layers of Hammond organ and synthesized strings. Her vocals are restrained and joyful. On "To Be Around You", an upbeat track that features house-driven keyboards, Carey adopts a more staccato vocal delivery. It pays homage to Cheryl Lynn's "Got to Be Real" (1978) and features spoken voices at the end. The lyrics are about an attentive lover whom the narrator enjoys being around.

The ninth track on Emotions, "Till the End of Time", is an atmospheric love ballad with a melody that Nickson likened to a lullaby. The song starts with hushed vocals that gradually become more impassioned as the song progresses, reaching a climax during the bridge. The album closes with "The Wind", an R&B and jazz ballad featuring a restrained vocal performance. It is based on a composition of the same name by pianist Russ Freeman; thus, he received credit as a composer. Inspired by the death of a friend in a drunk-driving accident, Carey described the song as "a reflection on a lot of the young people who are dying of different things today", citing AIDS and other tragedies as influences on its theme.

== Marketing ==
=== Artwork and release ===
Columbia Records issued Emotions in the United States on September 17, 1991, and in Japan on October 4. During this time, it was common practice for artists to release an album every two years. This would allow the first album to sell as many copies as possible and for fans of the follow-up album to search the artist's catalog and discover their earlier works. Carey's record label forwent this formula in favor of the 1960s method, in which acts would release an album or two yearly. Columbia's decision to release Emotions so soon was due to Carey "growing so much" from her debut album. The cover photograph features Carey's face illuminated while her body is largely obscured by shadow. She poses with her head tilted back and mouth open; her hands rest around her knees. Slant Magazine's Sal Cinquemani interpreted the composition as "suggesting a struggle between chastity and sexual liberation, confinement and freedom".

=== Live performances ===
Carey was reluctant to promote Emotions through public appearances, as was the case with Mariah Carey. Unlike its predecessor, however, Emotions received little marketing and promotional support. Columbia also scaled back its pre-release promotion, instead relying on the success and publicity of her previous album to generate interest. Furthermore, Carey did not embark on a tour for the album due to stage fright. Instead, Emotions was promoted through television and award-show appearances. She performed the title track for the first time at the 1991 MTV Video Music Awards in September. She promoted "Can't Let Go" and "If It's Over" on Saturday Night Live in November 1991, followed by performances of "Emotions" and "Can't Let Go" at the Soul Train Music Awards in March 1992.

In the United Kingdom, Carey performed "Emotions" live on Top of the Pops in October 1991, and "Can't Let Go" was featured via satellite in January 1992. Clips from the music videos for "Emotions" and "Make It Happen" also appeared as Top 40 Breaker clips in October 1991 and April 1992, respectively. In March 1992, Sony organized a live performance at Kaufman Astoria Studios in New York for MTV Unplugged. Broadcast on MTV, the special promoted Emotions with focus on Carey's singing; it was arranged as a response to critics who deemed her an industry plant. Alongside songs from Mariah Carey, she sang "Emotions", "If It's Over", "Make It Happen", and "Can't Let Go". Columbia subsequently released the performances as a live extended play on June 2.

=== Singles ===
Columbia released "Emotions" as the album's lead single in August 1991. In the United States, the song registered Carey's highest debut on the Billboard Hot 100 Singles chart at the time, entering at thirty-five. In its sixth week on the chart, it reached number one, where it remained for three weeks. "Emotions" became Carey's fifth consecutive number-one single on the Hot 100, extending a streak that began with her debut single, "Vision of Love". This made her the only artist to have her first five singles reach number one, breaking her tie with the Jackson 5. "Emotions" also topped the charts in Canada and reached the top five in Greece and New Zealand. The song's accompanying music video, directed by Jeff Preiss, depicts Carey driving through New York City, where she encounters friends, dancers, and gospel singers along the way.

"Can't Let Go" was issued as the second single from Emotions in November 1991. After debuting at number forty-two, it stalled at number two on the Hot 100 in its eleventh week; it was held off the top spot by Color Me Badd's "All 4 Love". The song's chart run was affected by Columbia's decision to withdraw the single from stores, thereby turning buyers' attention towards the album and thus boosting its sales. "Can't Let Go" peaked within the top ten on sales and airplay charts in Canada. Jim Sonzero directed the song's black-and-white music video, which depicts Carey looking despondent while wearing a black halter top with diamonds. She is situated in a house with flowers and letters.

"Make It Happen" was released as the third and final single from Emotions in February 1992. Entering the US Hot 100 at number seventy-four, the song peaked at number five in its eighth week on the chart. "Make It Happen" became Carey's lowest-charting single at the time. It also reached number seven on Canada's Top Singles chart. Marcus Nispel directed its music video, which was filmed in a dusty, deserted church. A benefit event inside, titled "Save Our Church", features Carey as the main performer, leading a choir in song as she sings to the constant cheering and applause of the crowd.

== Critical reception ==
=== Initial reviews ===
Professional ratings
Contemporaneous
Review scores
Source	Rating
Chicago Tribune	3/4 stars
Entertainment Weekly	C
Lancaster New Era	1.5/4 stars
Los Angeles Times	2/4 stars
Orlando Sentinel	1/5 stars
Rolling Stone (Note: From David Wild's review. Rob Tannenbaum gave the album two out of five stars.)	3/5 stars
Tampa Tribune	1.5/5 stars

On release, Emotions received mixed reviews. Several critics embraced the departures from Carey's debut and believed she was growing artistically, finding the production and songs to be welcome changes. Christian Wright of New York Newsday considered the simpler arrangements effective. (Note: Attributed to David Dishneau of the Associated Press, David Hiltbrand of People, and Christian Wright of New York Newsday) Multiple journalists agreed that Emotions dispelled concerns that Carey might be a one-album wonder and that she would suffer a sophomore slump. (Note: Attributed to Stephen Holden of The New York Times, Paul Willistein of The Morning Call, Neil Randall of Waterloo Region Record, Michael Corcoran of Chicago Sun-Times, and Steve Bloom of LNP.) The Winnipeg Sun writer John Kendle believed that, considering the significant success of her previous album, a sophomore slump was inevitable.

Many commentators found the album's lyrics dull. They panned its themes of love and heartbreak, deeming them trite or uninteresting. Stephen Holden of The New York Times wrote that the tracks were marred by "blunt, strung-together" pop clichés and little rhyming. Both Dennis Hunt from the Los Angeles Times and Entertainment Weekly's Arion Berger criticized the lyrics as resembling poor high school poetry; Hunt felt they lacked subtlety and irony. Favorable reviews about the lyrics came from a critic for Lancaster New Era and David Bauder of the Associated Press, who believed that Carey had improved as a songwriter. They opined that her lyrics had matured and said that Emotions proved she could write songs with emotional resonance. The Boston Globe's Steve Morse thought her lyricism was remarkable.

Carey's vocals were a recurring point of praise. Critics, including those who criticized her songwriting as substandard, praised Carey's control and range as technically impressive. Jim Farber, writing for the New York Daily News, described her vocal ability as "undeniably skillful" and likened her technique to Whitney Houston's during her rise to fame. Steve Bloom from LNP found her voice "otherworldly" and felt that listening to her upper register vocals made the album worth buying. Some critics felt that she was singing without feeling or was overusing her whistle register. Berger described Emotions as "gospel without soul, love songs without passion, [and] pop without buoyancy". Rob Tannenbaum of Rolling Stone wrote that her singing was more "impressive than expressive". Roger Catlin of the Hartford Courant and Gary Graff of the Detroit Free Press considered Carey's use of the whistle register unnecessary much of the time, although the latter acknowledged that it was "technically impressive".

=== Accolades and retrospective reviews ===
Professional ratings
Retrospective
Review scores
Source	Rating
AllMusic	4/5 stars
Christgau's Consumer Guide	(dud)
Encyclopedia of Popular Music	3/5 stars
The Rolling Stone Album Guide	3/5 stars

In 1992, Carey received nominations for Producer of the Year and Best Female Pop Vocal Performance for the title track of Emotions at the 34th Annual Grammy Awards. She lost in both categories.

The album has received retrospective assessments from music critics in the years since its release. AllMusic writer Ashley S. Battel wrote in the early 2010s that Emotions refuted any claims of a sophomore slump. Battell lauded the album for its dance, R&B, and gospel influences, which she believed could evoke a range of emotions in listeners. In 2025, Sal Cinquemani of Slant Magazine praised Carey's ability to "strike a balance of soul and pop" that was both technically impressive and emotionally sincere. In a separate article, published in 2023, Cinquemani described the album as an underrated entry in her discography. He noted that the autobiographical songs "Make It Happen" and "The Wind" foreshadowed, respectively, the inspirational anthems and confessional songs that became recurring features of her later albums.

In 1998, Nickson credited Emotions with showing Carey's "remarkable" consistency and said that there was more "finesse in everything" in terms of artistry, including the writing, arrangements, and singing. Meanwhile, Rolling Stone's Tim Chan wrote in 2025 that although Emotions was not a sophomore slump, it was nevertheless one of Carey's weaker albums. That year, Classic Pop's Jon O'Brien deemed Emotions Carey's "least essential listen" from her imperial phase. He added that it proved she "wasn't interested in resting on her laurels" and showed that, though often marketed as traditional pop, she had "her fingers firmly on the contemporary pulse". In 2023, HotNewHipHop's Barnell Anderson praised Emotions as being a good display of Carey's vocal abilities. "On rankings of Carey's albums, Cinquemani placed it at number two; Anderson ranked it at number seven; and Chan positioned it at number thirteen.

== Commercial performance ==
In the United States, Emotions sold 129,000 units in its first week and entered the Billboard 200 at number four. Guns N' Roses' Use Your Illusion II and Use Your Illusion I, as well as Garth Brooks's Ropin' the Wind, prevented it from topping the chart. Emotions spent fifty-four weeks on the Billboard 200 and was Carey's lowest-charting album there until Glitter (2001) peaked at number seven. On the Top 200 Pop Albums chart published by Cash Box, Emotions peaked at number three. The album is certified quadruple platinum by the Recording Industry Association of America, which denotes shipments of four million copies. By September 2021, the album had sold 3.61 million copies in the United States. In Canada, Emotions debuted at number fourteen on the albums chart published by RPM. It peaked at number six in its fourth week on the chart, where it remained for one week. Emotions reached number five on The Record's albums chart. The Canadian Recording Industry Association certified it quadruple platinum, which represents shipments of 400,000 units.

In the United Kingdom, Emotions opened at number ten on the country's albums chart. It reached number four in its seventeenth week, surpassing the number-six peak of Carey's debut album. Emotions remained on the chart for forty weeks. The album is certified platinum by the British Phonographic Industry, denoting shipments of 300,000 units. On the Dutch albums chart compiled by the Stichting Nederlandse Top 40, Emotions debuted at number forty-four. It reached its peak of number nine in its third week, where it remained for two weeks, and stayed on the chart for thirty-five weeks. The Nederlandse Vereniging van Producenten en Importeurs van beeld- en geluidsdragers awarded it a platinum certification, which denotes shipments of 100,000 units. On the Swedish albums chart, Emotions debuted at number twenty-six, peaked at number thirteen, and charted for five weeks. On the Swiss albums chart, it debuted at number sixteen, peaked at number fifteen, and charted for nine weeks. The International Federation of the Phonographic Industry certified it platinum in Sweden and gold in Switzerland, indicating shipments of 100,000 and 50,000 units, respectively, in those countries. It did not chart in France but was certified gold by the Syndicat National de l'Édition Phonographique, representing shipments of 100,000 units.

Emotions debuted at number twelve on the albums chart published by the Australian Recording Industry Association (ARIA), peaking at number eight in its fourth week. The ARIA certified it platinum, denoting shipments of 70,000 units. In New Zealand, the album debuted at its peak of number six and was certified platinum by the Recording Industry Association of New Zealand (now Recorded Music NZ), denoting shipments of 15,000 units in the country. In Japan, Emotions debuted at number three on the official Oricon chart, becoming Carey's first top-ten album in the country. The album has sold over one million units in the country, and the Recording Industry Association of Japan certified it quadruple platinum. Internationally, Emotions has sold over eight million copies.

== Track listing ==
All lyrics are written by Mariah Carey.

No.	Title	Music	Producer(s)	Length
1.	"Emotions"	Carey; David Cole; Robert Clivillés	Carey; Clivillés; Cole	4:09
2.	"And You Don't Remember"	Carey; Walter Afanasieff	Carey; Afanasieff	4:26
3.	"Can't Let Go"	Carey; Afanasieff	Carey; Afanasieff	4:27
4.	"Make It Happen"	Carey; Cole; Clivillés	Carey; Clivillés; Cole	5:07
5.	"If It's Over"	Carey; Carole King	Carey; Afanasieff	4:38
6.	"You're So Cold"	Carey; Cole	Carey; Clivillés; Cole	5:05
7.	"So Blessed"	Carey; Afanasieff	Carey; Afanasieff	4:13
8.	"To Be Around You"	Carey; Cole	Carey; Clivillés; Cole	4:37
9.	"Till the End of Time"	Carey; Afanasieff	Carey; Afanasieff	5:35
10.	"The Wind"	Russell Freeman	Carey; Afanasieff	4:41
Total length:				47:02

Sample credits

- "The Wind" contains a sample of "The Wind" by Chet Baker and Russell Freeman (1954).

== Personnel ==
Adapted from the album's liner notes

- Mariah Carey – producer, arranger, vocal arrangements, vocals
- David Cole – producer, arranger, vocal arrangements, drum programming, audio mixing
- Robert Clivillés – producer, arranger, drum programming, audio mixing
- Walter Afanasieff – producer, arranger, drums and percussion arrangements, horn arrangements, vocal arrangements, programming, Synclavier/Akai programming
- Alan Friedman – programming
- Gary Cirimelli – Synclavier/Macintosh programming
- Ren Klyce – Synclavier/Akai programming
- Lewis Delgatto – horn arrangements
- Acar S. Key – recording engineer
- Bruce Miller – recording engineer
- Dana Jon Chappelle – recording engineer, audio mixing
- John Mathias – recording engineer
- Tony Maserati – recording engineer
- Bruce Calder – assistant recording engineer
- Craig Silvey – assistant recording engineer
- Lolly Grodner – assistant recording engineer
- M. T. Silvia – assistant recording engineer
- Manny LaCarrubba – assistant recording engineer
- Bob Rosa – audio mixing
- Bob Ludwig – mastering
- Josephine DiDonato – art direction
- Phillip Dixion – photography
- Tommy Mottola – executive producer
- Horizon Entertainment Management Group Inc. – management

== Charts ==
=== Weekly charts ===
Weekly chart performance
Chart (1991–1992)	Peak position
Australian Albums (ARIA)	8
Austrian Albums (Ö3 Austria)	39
Canada Top Albums/CDs (RPM)	6
Canadian Albums (The Record)	5
Danish Albums (IFPI)	8
Dutch Albums (Album Top 100)	9
Dutch Albums (Stichting Nederlandse Top 40)	7
European Albums (Top 100)	12
Finnish Albums (Suomen virallinen lista)	12
German Albums (Offizielle Top 100)	46
Italian Albums (Musica e dischi)	16
Japanese Albums (Oricon)	3
New Zealand Albums (RMNZ)	6
Norwegian Albums (VG-lista)	8
Spanish Albums (PROMUSICAE)	38
Swedish Albums (Sverigetopplistan)	13
Swiss Albums (Schweizer Hitparade)	15
UK Albums (Official Charts)	4
UK Albums (MRIB)	5
UK Dance Albums (CIN)	1
US Billboard 200	4
US Top R&B/Hip-Hop Albums (Billboard)	6
US Top 200 Pop Albums (Cash Box)	3
US Top 75 R&B Albums (Cash Box)	6

1995–2023 weekly chart performance
Chart (1995–2023)	Peak position
Dutch Albums (Album Top 100)	59
Scottish Albums (Official Charts)	67
UK Albums Sales (OCC)	39
UK R&B Albums (Official Charts)	3
UK Record Store (OCC)	23

=== Year-end charts ===
1991 year-end chart performance
Chart (1991)	Position
Australian Albums (ARIA)	85
Canada Top Albums/CDs (RPM)	35
Dutch Albums (MegaCharts)	52
Swedish Albums (Sverigetopplistan)	78
Japanese Albums (Oricon)	80

1992 year-end chart performance
Chart (1992)	Position
Canada Top Albums/CDs (RPM)	95
Japanese Albums (Oricon)	83
UK Albums (OCC)	62
UK Albums (MRIB)	33
US Billboard 200	22
US Top R&B/Hip-Hop Albums (Billboard)	21

== Certifications and sales ==
Certifications and sales
Region	Certification	Certified units/sales
Australia (ARIA)	Platinum	70,000^{^}
Canada (Music Canada)	4× Platinum	400,000^{^}
France (SNEP)	Gold	100,000^{*}
Japan (RIAJ)	5× Platinum	1,000,000^{^}
Netherlands (NVPI)	Platinum	100,000^{^}
New Zealand (RMNZ)	Platinum	15,000^{^}
Sweden (GLF)	Platinum	100,000^{^}
Switzerland (IFPI Switzerland)	Gold	25,000^{^}
United Kingdom (BPI)	Platinum	300,000^{^}
United States (RIAA)	4× Platinum	3,610,000
Summaries
Worldwide	—	8,000,000
^{*} Sales figures based on certification alone.^{^} Shipments figures based on certification alone.

== Sources ==
- Cader, Michael, ed. (1994). Saturday Night Live: The First Twenty Years. Boston: Houghton Mifflin. ISBN 0-395-70895-8. OL 1106604M.
- Carey, Mariah; Davis, Michaela Angela (2020). The Meaning of Mariah Carey. New York: Andy Cohen Books. ISBN 978-1-250-16468-1.
- Chan, Andrew (2023). Why Mariah Carey Matters. Music Matters. University of Texas Press. ISBN 978-1-4773-2507-0.
- Lwin, Nanda (1999). Top 40 Hits: The Essential Chart Guide. Music Data Canada. ISBN 1-896594-13-1.
- Nickson, Chris (1998). Mariah Carey Revisited: Her Story. St. Martin's Press. ISBN 978-0-312-19512-0.
- Shapiro, Marc (2001). Mariah Carey: The Unauthorized Biography. ECW Press. ISBN 978-1-55022-444-3.
