= If It's Over =

1992 single by Mariah Carey

Song by Mariah Carey

from the album Emotions
- Released: September 17, 1991
- Recorded: 1991
- Studio: Right Track Recording (New York City; original version)
- Genre: Soul; gospel blues
- Length: 4:38
- Label: Columbia Records
- Composers: Carole King; Carey
- Lyricist: Mariah Carey
- Producers: Walter Afanasieff; Mariah Carey

Audio video
- "If It's Over" on YouTube

"If It's Over"

Single by Mariah Carey

from the album MTV Unplugged
- Released: August 28, 1992
- Recorded: March 16, 1992
- Studio: Kaufman Astoria Studios (New York City)
- Genre: Soul; gospel blues
- Length: 3:47
- Label: Columbia
- Composers: Carole King; Mariah Carey
- Lyricist: Mariah Carey
- Producers: Walter Afanasieff; Mariah Carey

Mariah Carey singles chronology
"I'll Be There" (1992)	"If It's Over" (1992)	"Dreamlover" (1993)

Live video
- "If It's Over" on YouTube

"If It's Over" is a song written by American singer-songwriters Mariah Carey and Carole King, with the former and Walter Afanasieff helming its production. It was originally released as an album track from Carey's second studio album, Emotions, which was issued September 17, 1991. Lyrically, the song tells of a romance that has withered, and finds the protagonist asking her lover, "if it's over, let me go". Several months after the release of Emotions, Carey performed the song during her appearance on the television show MTV Unplugged.

Following the release of the MTV Unplugged EP, the song's live version was used as the second single released from the EP in late 1992. The live single version omits the second verse and chorus, as the songs were shortened for the show. It received a very limited release, being featured as an airplay only single in certain territories. Its only peak was in the Netherlands, where it reached number eighty. Carey performed “If It's Over” live during the 34th annual Grammy Awards and on Saturday Night Live.

== Background and recording ==
During promotion for Carey's self-titled debut album (1990), she appeared on The Arsenio Hall Show to perform her first single, "Vision of Love". During the very much talked about performance, singer-songwriter Carole King had been watching Carey perform, taking interest in her and her material. One year later, during the recording sessions for Carey's second studio album, Emotions (1991), King contacted Carey, asking if she would be interested in covering "(You Make Me Feel Like) A Natural Woman", a song she had written alongside Gerry Goffin for Aretha Franklin. Carey declined, feeling uneasy about covering a song one of her musical influences executed so perfectly. Still determined to work with Carey, King flew out to New York City for one day, in hopes of writing and composing a ballad of some sort. Throughout the day, the two songwriters exchanged musical ideas and melodies on the piano until "If It's Over" came into conception. In an interview following the collaboration, King said the following regarding Carey: "I love her voice. She's very expressive. She gives a lot of meaning to what she sings."

== Composition ==
"If It's Over" is a downtempo ballad, which incorporates several genres and influences into its sound and instrumentation. Of them are R&B, soul and jazz, as well as drawing inspiration from 1950s and 1960s music and style. The song was written by Carey and Carole King, with both helming the song's production as well. Instrumentally, "If It's Over" features several musical melodies including baritone, tenor, alto and soprano saxophone notes, as well as the piano, trumpet, horn and bass. In the song, Carey makes brief use of the whistle register, prior to the last belted crescendo. According to author Chris Nickson, the song's instrumentation and basis was crucial to Carey's performance throughout the song. Additionally, he described its content and instrumentation:

"As a song full of gospel and soulful influences, it allowed Mariah to really tear loose and show what she could do – which in reality was far more than the vocal gymnastics that seemed to comprise her reputation so far. From a deep rumble to a high wail, she covered five octaves wonderfully, as the power of the tune built. The backing vocals – which once again had those churchy harmonies – filled out the spare melody, as did the stately horns, which entered towards the end. The song was truly a vocal showcase for Mariah."

== Live performances ==
Carey performed "If It's Over" on the 17th season of Saturday Night Live, alongside "Can't Let Go". During the performance, Carey appeared on stage wearing a black leather sports jacket, as well as matching black pants and boots. Walter Afanasieff played the piano, while Trey Lorenz, Patrique McMillan and Melonie Daniels provided the live background vocals. Additionally, five additional musicians were provided; Lew Delgado, baritone saxophone; Lenny Pickett, tenor saxophone; George Young, alto saxophone; Earl Gardner, trumpet; and Steve Turre, trombone. Additionally, Carey performed "If It's Over" at the 34th annual Grammy Awards, held on February 26, 1992. As the curtain was drawn, Carey walked on stage wearing a red and black evening gown, while sporting a golden-curly hairstyle. Behind a large red curtain held behind her, several back up singers were placed standing on a concealed elevated platform. On March 16, 1992, Carey performed the song live as part of a seven-piece set-list for MTV Unplugged. The show aired on MTV several times, and was eventually released as an EP titled, MTV Unplugged.

=== Release ===
Following the release of "I'll Be There" as the lead single from MTV Unplugged a month prior to the EP's public arrival, Carey's live version of "If It's Over" from MTV Unplugged was released as an airplay-only single in a few countries. It was released on CD and cassette as a commercial single in Australia on November 23, 1992. In Japan it was issued as a mini CD on December 21, 1992. Following its release, promotion for Carey's second studio effort Emotions was halted.

== Reception ==
Upon release, "If It's Over" garnered generally positive critical appreciation from contemporary music critics. Bill Lamb from About.com commented that the song "stands with Carey's best," and complimented its gospel infusion. AllMusic's Ashley S. Battel wrote "it will take you on a musical journey," while describing the song's vocals and instrumentation. Jan DeKnock from The Chicago Tribune compared it to "the style of the great soul ballads of the `60s." People Magazine stated that the singer "does bank her pyrotechnics" for the "sultry" song. Rob Tannenbaum from Rolling Stone gave it a mixed review, comparing it to the work of Aretha Franklin, but said it "translates into such excesses as the falsetto whoops." The song only managed to chart at number 80 in the Netherlands, lasting five weeks in the chart.

== Track listing ==
Netherlands/European CD single

1. "If It's Over" (Live) – 3:47
2. "If It's Over" – 4:38

European CD maxi-single

1. "If It's Over" (Live) – 3:47
2. "If It's Over" – 4:38
3. "Someday" (New 12" jackswing) – 4:13

Japanese CD single

1. "If It's Over" (Live) – 3:47
2. "Emotions" – 3:59

== Credits and personnel ==
Recording

- Recorded and mixed at Right Track Recording, NYC.

Personnel

- Lyrics – Mariah Carey
- Music – Mariah Carey, Carole King
- Production – Mariah Carey, Walter Afanasieff
- Recording and mixing – Dana Jon Chappelle
- Keyboards and Synthesizers, Hammond B-6 Organ, Synclavier Strings and Tambourine – Walter Afanasieff
- Guitar – Cornell Dupree
- Bass – Will Lee
- Trumpet – Earl Gardner
- Trombone – Keith O'Quinn
- Tenor Saxophones – George Young, Larry Feldman
- Baritone Saxophone – Lewis Delgatto
- Drums – Steve Smith
- Akai Programming – Ren Klyce
- Macintosh programming – Gary Cirmelli
- Assistant engineer – Bruce Calder
- Vocal arrangement – Mariah Carey
- Background vocals – Mariah Carey, Trey Lorenz, Patrique McMillan, Cindy Mizelle

Credits adapted from the liner notes of Emotions.

== Charts ==
Chart (1992)	Peak position
Australia (ARIA)	115
Netherlands (Single Top 100)	80
