= Can't Let Go (Mariah Carey song) =

1991 single by Mariah Carey

- US cassette cover

Single by Mariah Carey

from the album Emotions
- B-side: "To Be Around You"
- Released: November 1991
- Recorded: 1991
- Studio: Skywalker Sound (Marin County, California); The Plant (Sausalito, California); Right Track Recording (New York City)
- Genre: R&B; pop
- Length: 4:27 (album version); 3:49 (single/video version)
- Label: Columbia
- Composers: Mariah Carey; Walter Afanasieff
- Lyricist: Mariah Carey
- Producers: Mariah Carey; Walter Afanasieff

Mariah Carey singles chronology
"Emotions" (1991)	"Can't Let Go" (1991)	"Make It Happen" (1992)

Music video
- "Can't Let Go" on YouTube

"Can't Let Go" is a song recorded by American singer-songwriter Mariah Carey for her second studio album, Emotions (1991). Columbia Records released it as the album's second single in November 1991. Featuring synthesizers and drum programming, "Can't Let Go" is a breakup song in the form of an R&B and pop slow jam. The lyrics, written by Carey, are about post-breakup sadness. She composed the music and produced the song with Walter Afanasieff, who had previously worked on her 1990 single "Love Takes Time". Carey's vocal range spans more than three octaves; her delivery is predominately breathy and in a low register, with whistle notes in the song's introduction and ending.

Music critics considered "Can't Let Go" a vocal showcase for Carey but gave the composition mixed reviews. In the United States, it received significant airplay across adult contemporary, contemporary hit, and urban contemporary radio formats. "Can't Let Go" peaked at number two on the Billboard Hot 100 chart and ended her streak of five consecutive number one songs dating to her debut, "Vision of Love". It also became her lowest-charting single in Australia, New Zealand, and the Netherlands at the time. Elsewhere, "Can't Let Go" peaked within the top ten on sales and airplay charts in Canada and at number twenty in the United Kingdom. The Recording Industry Association of America certified it gold.

Jim Sonzero directed the black and white music video, which depicts Carey singing alone in an empty house. She performed "Can't Let Go" on several American and British television programs such as MTV Unplugged, Saturday Night Live, and Top of the Pops. Carey sang it during her 2006 concert tour The Adventures of Mimi and the Las Vegas residencies The Butterfly Returns and The Celebration of Mimi. "Can't Let Go" is featured on her compilation albums Greatest Hits (2001) and The Ballads (2008).

== Background and release ==
After its release in June 1990, American singer Mariah Carey's eponymous debut album, produced in part by Walter Afanasieff, sold over seven million copies and four of its singles reached number one on the US Billboard Hot 100 chart. She resumed work with Afanasieff in late 1990 for her second album Emotions (1991); he had produced the Mariah Carey single "Love Takes Time" earlier that year. One of their first collaborations, "Can't Let Go", was recorded in 1991 after a demo received approval from Columbia Records executives.

Columbia issued Emotions on September 17, 1991, with "Can't Let Go" as the third track. The song garnered unsolicited airplay from American urban contemporary radio stations after the album's release. Columbia released it as a single in the United States in November 1991. "Can't Let Go" was the second single from Emotions, following the title track "Emotions". Unlike the latter, "Can't Let Go" was only distributed as a cassette single and seven-inch vinyl single in the United States instead of additional maxi cassette, twelve-inch vinyl, and compact disc configurations. Sony Music Japan released a mini CD single on December 5, 1991. The B-side for most formats was dance track "To Be Around You", an album cut from Emotions. "Can't Let Go" was later included on Carey's compilation albums Greatest Hits (2001) and The Ballads (2008).

== Music and lyrics ==
Musically, "Can't Let Go" is an R&B and pop song in the form of a slow jam. Carey wrote the lyrics herself and composed the music with Afanasieff. The lyrics of "Can't Let Go", a breakup song, are about sadness after the end of a relationship: "Do you know the way it feels when all you have just dies?" Referring to the line "Every night I see you in my dreams", author Andrew Chan said the song is about "how the one who's been left behind turns the void into something graspable" and French professor Beverly J. Evans stated it is indirectly influenced by the dream vision in the medieval poem Roman de la Rose. According to John Martinucci of the Gavin Report, Carey evokes "feelings of a unity that's been cast away without resolution". Sociology professor Thomas J. Scheff said the lyrics "My world is gone" and "But still you remain on my mind" show that the relationship in the song is defined by how a lover thinks they lack a future without the other who has moved on.

"Can't Let Go" opens with a minute of synthesizer and guitar instrumentation interspersed with faint notes from Carey in the whistle register. Chan thought this conjured "a sensation of space and distance" and biographer Chris Nickson remarked it resembled a hymn. Carey uses a nasal vocal delivery for the first word of the phrase "There you are" in the opening verse. Music professor Richard Rischar identified this as an example of the unique timbre patterns typically heard in ballads by Black artists. Arranged in gospel-influenced harmonies, Carey's vocals span three octaves and seven semitones from the low note of F_{3} to the high note of C♯_{7}. She remains in a low vocal register with a breathy delivery before concluding with a whistle note at the end of the song.

The chorus of "Can't Let Go"
Mariah Carey uses a breathy vocal delivery complemented by synthesizers and drum programming on "Can't Let Go".

According to official sheet music published by Hal Leonard, "Can't Let Go" has a moderate tempo of 80 beats per minute. The album version lasts four minutes and twenty-seven seconds and the edited single is three minutes and forty-nine seconds long. Complemented by drum programming, synthesizers feature prominently throughout the track. Assisted by Bruce Calder, Craig Silvey, Manny LaCarrubba, M. T. Silvia, and Lolly Grodner, Dana Jon Chappelle engineered "Can't Let Go" at Skywalker Sound in Marin County, California; The Plant Recording Studios in Sausalito, California; and Right Track Recording in New York City. After Afanasieff and Carey produced the song, Chappelle conducted mixing at Right Track Recording and Bob Ludwig mastered it at New York City's Masterdisk. "Can't Let Go" features guitars played by Michael Landau, keyboards and synthesizers from Afanasieff, and programming by Afanasieff, Ren Klyce, and Gary Cirimelli.

Critics considered the composition moody and compared it to songs by other artists. Billboard contributor Sal Cinquemani viewed it as a rewrite of "Make It Last Forever", a 1987 track by Keith Sweat. Boston Phoenix writer Amy Linden said the production recalls "any '80s black pop song"; Nickson said the song "could easily have been written in any decade from the fifties onward". As with "Emotions" and "Make It Happen", the other singles from Emotions, "Can't Let Go" was the subject of a lawsuit. Songwriters Sharon Taber and Randy Gonzales filed a claim in the United States District Court for the Central District of California against Carey, Afanasieff, and several music businesses in March 1992. They alleged the composition of the chorus in "Can't Let Go" is the same as that in their 1990 song "Right Before My Eyes". The defendants rejected the accusation and the case was dropped in a 1996 confidential settlement ahead of an impending trial.

== Critical reception ==
Professional ratings
Review scores
Source	Rating
Accrington Observer	2/5 stars
Entertainment Weekly	B+
Stereogum	6/10

Carey's vocal performance was a topic of critical commentary. Tampa Tribune writer Wayne Garcia thought her breathy delivery helped make "Can't Let Go" worthwhile. According to Chuck Campbell of The Knoxville News-Sentinel, Carey "glides on the sweeping beauty" of the song. Writing in The Times, David Sinclair said the whistle notes showcased her vocal abilities successfully. Randy Clark and Bryan DeVaney from Cash Box commented: "Her voice still has that crystal-clear sound that has hypnotized listeners of all sorts." Parry Gettelman of the Orlando Sentinel and Rashod D. Ollison of The Baltimore Sun deemed her singing histrionic.

The composition received mixed reviews. Diane Rufer and Ron Fell of the Gavin Report said it depicts heartbreak effectively. The New York Times writer Jon Caramanica and Peter Piatkowski in PopMatters called the song beautiful. Billboard contributor Princess Gabbara cited it as an example of Carey and Afanasieff's musical chemistry. According to Entertainment Weekly's Whitney Pastorek, "something in the structure creates these places where it could jump off and go in a different direction, sprout another tune, but then it zigs where it seems like it should zag". Differing in The Washington Post, Mike Joyce called the track "tiresome and predictable". Chan considered the lyrics marred by clichés and Siân Pattenden of Smash Hits said it sounds suitable for an advertisement.

== Commercial performance ==
Carey's first five singles, from "Vision of Love" to "Emotions", topped the Billboard Hot 100 Singles chart in the United States. "Can't Let Go" ended the streak when it peaked at number two on January 25, 1992. As of 2018, it is Carey's sixteenth-best performing song on the Hot 100. On the comparative Top 100 Pop Singles chart published by Cash Box, "Can't Let Go" became Carey's sixth consecutive number one song. A success across multiple radio formats, "Can't Let Go" reached number one on each of the adult contemporary airplay charts published by Billboard, Gavin Report, and Radio & Records magazines; the pop airplay charts by Gavin Report and Radio & Records; and the urban contemporary airplay chart by Radio & Records. The Recording Industry Association of America awarded "Can't Let Go" a gold certification in 2022, which denotes 500,000 units based on digital downloads and on-demand streams.

"Can't Let Go" achieved less success outside the United States. In Canada, the single peaked at number three on the airplay chart produced by RPM and number seven on the sales chart published by The Record. It reached the top twenty in the United Kingdom (No. 20) and on national airplay charts in Sweden and Norway (Nos. 20 and 14, respectively). On the pan-European sales chart compiled by Music & Media, "Can't Let Go" achieved a top ranking of sixty-nine. With peak positions of number twenty-one in New Zealand and number sixty-three in Australia, the single became her lowest-charting in those countries at the time. This recurred in the Netherlands as "Can't Let Go" reached number seventy-seven on the Single Top 100.

== Music video and performances ==
Jim Sonzero directed the song's accompanying music video, his first work with Carey. Filmed in black and white and composed of fewer than one hundred shots, the video features Carey looking despondent while wearing a black halter top with diamonds. She is situated in a house with flowers and letters. Nickson considered this style effective given the breakup nature of the song. Christine Werthman of Billboard described the video as simple and KQED's Emmanuel Hapsis thought it was boring. Music journalist Rip Rense considered Carey's scenes "self-consciously artsy". Following its release in late 1991, the video was included on Carey's 1992 album MTV Unplugged +3.

Carey performed "Can't Let Go" on several occasions. In 1991 and 1992, she sang it on American television shows such as MTV Unplugged, Soul Train, and Saturday Night Live. Carey promoted the song to a British audience on Top of the Pops. She included "Can't Let Go" in the setlist of her 2006 The Adventures of Mimi tour as part of a ballad medley. Carey performed the track during her Las Vegas concert residencies The Butterfly Returns (2018–2020) and The Celebration of Mimi (2024–2025). She appeared on rapper Rick Ross's song "Can't Say No" on his 2015 album Black Market, which samples "Can't Let Go".

== Track listings ==
- 7-inch vinyl, cassette, CD, mini CD singles
1. "Can't Let Go" (edit)
2. "To Be Around You"
- 12-inch vinyl single, CD maxi single 1
1. "Can't Let Go" (edit)
2. "To Be Around You"
3. "Can't Let Go"
- CD maxi single 2
1. "Can't Let Go" (edit)
2. "To Be Around You"
3. "The Wind"
- CD maxi single 3
1. "Can't Let Go" (edit)
2. "I Don't Wanna Cry"
3. "All in Your Mind"

== Credits and personnel ==
Recording

- Recorded at Skywalker Sound, Marin Country, California; The Plant Recording Studios, Sausalito, California; Right Track Recording, New York City.
- Mixed at Right Track Recording, New York City.
- Mastered at Masterdisk, New York City.

Personnel

- Lyrics, background vocals – Mariah Carey
- Music – Mariah Carey, Walter Afanasieff
- Production, arrangement – Walter Afanasieff, Mariah Carey
- Keyboards, synthesizers, synthesizer bass, Synclavier acoustic guitar, drums and percussion arrangements and programming – Walter Afanasieff
- Guitars – Michael Landau
- Synclavier/Akai programming – Ren Klyce
- Synclavier/Macintosh programming – Gary Cirimelli
- Engineering, mixing – Dana Jon Chappelle
- Assistant engineering – Bruce Calder, Craig Silvey, Manny LaCarrubba, M. T. Silvia, Lolly Grodner
- Mastering – Bob Ludwig

== Charts and certifications ==
1991–1992 weekly chart performance
Chart (Publisher)	Peak position
Australia (ARIA)	63
Canada Retail Singles (The Record)	7
Canada Contemporary Hit Radio (The Record)	2
Canada Hit Tracks (RPM)	3
Canada Adult Contemporary (RPM)	3
Europe (Eurochart Hot 100)	69
Europe (European Dance Radio)	19
Europe (European Hit Radio)	16
Israel (Israeli Singles Chart)	17
Luxembourg (Radio Luxembourg)	17
Netherlands Single Top 100 (Dutch Charts)	77
New Zealand Singles (RIANZ)	21
Norway Airplay (Radio Topp 20)	14
Sweden Airplay (Airplay Sweden)	20
UK Singles (CIN)	20
UK Singles (MRIB)	18
UK Airplay (ERA)	19
US Hot 100 Singles (Billboard)	2
US Hot Adult Contemporary (Billboard)	1
US Hot R&B Singles (Billboard)	2
US Top 100 Pop Singles (Cash Box)	1
US Top 100 R&B Singles (Cash Box)	1
US Adult Contemporary (Gavin Report)	1
US Crossover (Gavin Report)	1
US Top 40 (Gavin Report)	1
US Urban Contemporary (Gavin Report)	2
US Adult Contemporary (Radio & Records)	1
US Contemporary Hit Radio (Radio & Records)	1
US Urban Contemporary (Radio & Records)	1

1992 year-end chart performance
Chart (Publisher)	Position
Canada Retail Singles (The Record)	46
Canada Hit Tracks (RPM)	47
Canada Adult Contemporary (RPM)	11
US Hot 100 Singles (Billboard)	23
US Hot Adult Contemporary (Billboard)	11
US Hot R&B Singles (Billboard)	24
US Top 100 Pop Singles (Cash Box)	23
US Adult Contemporary (Gavin Report)	82
US Top 40 (Gavin Report)	39
US Urban Contemporary (Gavin Report)	45
US Adult Contemporary (Radio & Records)	25
US Contemporary Hit Radio (Radio & Records)	34
US Urban (Radio & Records)	42

List of certifications
Region (Organization)	Units (Certification)
United States (RIAA)	500,000 (Gold)

== See also ==
- Billboard Year-End Hot 100 singles of 1992
- List of Hot Adult Contemporary number ones of 1992
- List of Cash Box Top 100 number-one singles of 1992
