= Emotions (Mariah Carey song) =

1991 single by Mariah Carey

- US CD/vinyl variant of the standard artwork

Single by Mariah Carey

from the album Emotions
- B-side: "Vanishing"; "Vision of Love"; "There's Got to Be a Way" (12" Mix)
- Released: August 14, 1991
- Recorded: March 1991
- Studio: Right Track Recording (New York City, NY); Axis Studios (New York City, NY)
- Genre: R&B; dance; post-disco; dance-pop; soul
- Length: 4:08
- Label: Columbia
- Composers: Mariah Carey; David Cole; Robert Clivillés
- Lyricist: Mariah Carey
- Producers: David Cole; Robert Clivillés; Mariah Carey

Mariah Carey singles chronology
"There's Got to Be a Way" (1991)	"Emotions" (1991)	"Can't Let Go" (1991)

Music video
- "Emotions" on YouTube

"Emotions" is a song recorded by American singer-songwriter Mariah Carey for her second studio album of the same name (1991). It was written and produced by Carey, Robert Clivillés, and David Cole of C+C Music Factory and released as the album's lead single on August 14, 1991, by Columbia Records. The song's lyrics has its protagonist going through a variety of emotions from high to low, up to the point where she declares, "You got me feeling emotions." Musically, it is a gospel and R&B song heavily influenced by 1970s disco music, specifically the song "Best of My Love" by The Emotions and showcases Carey's upper range and extensive use of the whistle register. Jeff Preiss directed the song's music video.

"Emotions" received positive reviews from music critics, who mainly praised Carey's vocal performance. The song became Carey's fifth consecutive number one song in the United States, topping the Billboard Hot 100 for three weeks, making her the only act to have their first five singles top the chart. Internationally, it was a moderate success, topping the Canadian Singles Chart, and reaching the top 10 in Greece, the Netherlands, New Zealand and Panama. It received a nomination for the Grammy Award for Best Female Pop Vocal Performance at the 34th Annual ceremony.

== Background ==
Carey was sent to work with the C+C Music Factory and they composed the song "You're So Cold", which became the first choice for the album's first single. However, a second session with the production team had them feeling in a lighter mood when "Emotions" was created and finally decided upon as the lead single.

== Composition ==
Emotions (1991)
20-second chorus of the song.

"Emotions" is a "new-disco" song with a "moderate dance tempo" of 116 beats per minute. Carey's vocal range spans five octaves and five semitones on the track, from B_{2} to G_{7}, with the highest note being sung with arpeggios.

It was later publicly revealed that the track borrowed from Maurice White's "Best of My Love", written for the band The Emotions. This situation led to an out-of-court settlement between both sides.

== Music videos and remixes ==
"Emotions" received a music video directed by Jeff Preiss, with production by Joanna Mattingly, and executive production by Debbie Samuelson. It was filmed in black and white and features Carey and friends with exotic animals while partying and having fun around town in New York City. The video was desaturated but still maintains various color tints, which change from brown to red to blue and so forth.

David Cole and Robert Clivillés created the main remix of "Emotions", known as "Emotions" (12" Club Mix). Although Carey did not re-record her vocals for it, she added a new gospel-style intro before the song's dance portion. This new intro was used when she performed "Emotions" on MTV Unplugged in 1992, as well as at some later concerts. A music video was created using the 12" club mix, but only slight changes in editing differentiate it from the video for the original version. The remix was later featured on Carey's 2003 remix album The Remixes.

Canadian rapper Drake sampled the song's 12" Club Mix version in the song "Emotionless" from his 2018 album Scorpion.

On July 31, 2020, along with the celebration of the 30th anniversary of her debut studio album Mariah Carey, as well as Carey celebrating 30 years in the music industry, she released the song as a five track extended play, titled Emotions EP, which contains some remixes from both the US and European CD maxi singles.

== Reception ==
=== Critical reception ===
Professional ratings
Review scores
Source	Rating
Entertainment Weekly	A−
The Reporter	1/5 stars
Stereogum	8/10

"Emotions" received positive reviews from critics. About.com's Bill Lamb called the high notes as the pros of the album itself and that it stands with Mariah's best. AllMusic editor Ashley S. Battel highlighted the song and wrote that it is upbeat and it serves to send the listener on a musical journey filled with varying emotions. Billboard magazine editor Larry Flick said, "Although the heat generated by her multiplatinum debut album has barely cooled, Carey previews her sophomore set with a dance /pop ditty that will remind some of the Emotions' "Best of my Love". Expect instant multiformat attention." Henderson and DeVaney from Cashbox described it as "a happy, perky soul/pop number bearing a resemblance to the music the group The Emotions embraced during the 1970s". Chicago Tribune editor Jan DeKnock wrote "just listen to those incredibly high notes on the title cut and current single 'Emotions.'"

A reviewer from Los Angeles Times wrote that this song's producers somewhat perk up this song but he noted that the song can't match the quality of any C+C material. Pan-European magazine Music & Media said it "is a good display of Carey's impressive vocal gymnastics. A fashionable co-production by Cole and Clivilles (C&C Music Factory) is paired to a gospel-tinged pop groove." Music Week's reviewer called it a "dynamic gospel/R&B-inflected house track". Rolling Stone writer Rob Tannenbaum also said, "they (producers) back Carey with pumping house keyboards and shamelessly recycle the chords of Cheryl Lynn's 'Got to Be Real' and the Emotions' 'Best of My Love' to construct the bubbly new-disco 'Emotions.'" Sun Sentinel magazine editor Deborah Wiler wrote that "the unimaginative first single, Emotions, sounds suspiciously like the `77 hit Best of My Love (by the Emotions)."

=== Accolades ===
"Emotions" was nominated for the 1992 Grammy Award for Best Pop Vocal Performance, Female, losing to "Something to Talk About" by Bonnie Raitt. It won a BMI R&B Award, continuing Carey's unbroken streak of wins for this award. Carey was also nominated for Producer of the Year (non-classical), becoming the second woman to achieve this honor. "Emotions" is used in "Percy Jackson and the Olympians" Season 2 (2025).

== Chart performance ==
On August 31, 1991, "Emotions" debuted at number 35 on the US Billboard Hot 100, becoming the highest debut of the week. It reached number one six weeks later, remaining at the top for three consecutive weeks, replacing "Good Vibrations" by Marky Mark and the Funky Bunch featuring Loleatta Holloway and replaced by Karyn White's "Romantic". "Emotions" became Carey's fifth single to reach number one in 15 months, and also gave her the distinction of being the first act to have their first five singles reach number one on the chart. It remained in the top 40 for 20 weeks and was one of four singles from Carey on the Hot 100's 1991 year-end chart, ranking 22. The song topped the Hot R&B/Hip-Hop Songs chart and became her second number one single on the Hot Dance Club Play chart. The Recording Industry Association of America (RIAA) eventually certified it Platinum on October 9, 2019.

Outside the United States, it was Carey's most successful single since "Vision of Love" (1990), the lead single from her debut album. It topped the charts in Canada, becoming Carey's third chart-topper in the country. It also reached the top-five in Greece and New Zealand, and became her second single to reach the United Kingdom top 20 since her debut after “Vision of Love” reached number 9 the previous year. It was a modest hit in Australia, where it just missed the top ten, but its success in Europe was limited.

== Live performances ==
Carey performed "Emotions" live for the first time at the 1991 MTV Video Music Awards, backed by several male and female back up vocalists. Following the award show appearance, she sang "Emotions" on The Arsenio Hall Show, airing on September 23, 1991. Carey opened every show with "Emotions" during her Music Box Tour in 1993, Daydream World Tour in 1996, Butterfly World Tour in 1998, and Rainbow World Tour in 2000. However, she omitted the second verse in it when performing the song during the Rainbow World Tour. On New Year's Eve 2009, Carey sang "Emotions" on the first night of her Angels Advocate Tour (2009–2010). It was the first time she had sung Emotions live in almost 10 years since the Rainbow World Tour (2000).

She sang "Emotions" on her The Elusive Chanteuse Show tour in 2014, as well as in her first annual Christmas show at the Beacon Theatre in New York City, All I Want For Christmas Is You, A Night of Joy & Festivity (2014). The song was also featured in Carey's Las Vegas residency, #1 to Infinity. For the performance, Carey entered the stage singing the MTV Unplugged version of the song, while Las Vegas showgirls danced on the stage.

On December 31, 2016, Carey attempted to sing "Emotions" during a live performance in Times Square for the television special Dick Clark's New Year's Rockin' Eve, but the performance was afflicted by technical issues that prevented her from hearing her backing track. Carey's management claimed that the producers of the program had refused to acknowledge the issue prior to her performance and had "set her up to fail," but these claims were denied by Dick Clark Productions. The song was also featured in Carey's Las Vegas residency, The Butterfly Returns. For the Caution World Tour in 2019, the song was part of a medley alongside "You Don't Know What To Do".

== Track listings ==
US 7" single – 38 73977
US Cassette single – 38T 73977
Europe CD single – 657403 1
UK Cassette single – 657403 4
UK 7" single – 657403 7

1. "Emotions" (LP version) – 4:08
2. "Vanishing" – 4:11

US 12" single – 44 74037
US Cassette maxi-single – 44T 74037

1. "Emotions" (12" Club Mix) – 5:57
2. "Emotions" (LP version) – 4:08
3. "Emotions" (12" Instrumental) – 5:03
4. "There's Got to Be a Way" (12" Mix) – 8:21

US CD maxi-single – 44K 74037

1. "Emotions" (12" Club Mix) – 5:57
2. "Emotions" (12" Instrumental) – 5:03
3. "Emotions" (LP version) – 4:08
4. "There's Got to Be a Way" (12" Mix) – 8:21
5. "There's Got to Be a Way" (Vocal Dub Mix) – 7:03

UK CD single – 657403 2
UK 12" single – 657403 6

1. "Emotions" (LP version) – 4:08
2. "Vanishing" – 4:11
3. "Vision of Love" – 3:28

Europe CD maxi-single – 657403 5
Europe 12" single – 657403 9

1. "Emotions" (C&C Club Mix) – 5:48
2. "Emotions" (C&C 12" Club No.1 Mix) – 7:42
3. "Emotions" (C&C Dub-Dub Mix) – 5:47

Emotions Digital EP

1. "Emotions" (Special Motion Edit) – 4:49
2. "Emotions" (12" Club Mix) – 5:51
3. "Emotions" (C&C 12" Club No. 1 Mix) – 7:44
4. "Emotions" (C&C Dub-Dub Mix) – 5:45
5. "Emotions" (12" Instrumental) – 5:05

== Credits and personnel ==
Credits adapted from the liner notes of Emotions.

Recording

- Recorded at Right Track Recording and Axis Studios, NYC.
- Mixed at Axis Studios, NYC.

Personnel

- Lyrics – Mariah Carey
- Music – Mariah Carey, David Cole, Robert Clivillés
- Production – David Cole, Robert Clivillés, Mariah Carey
- Programming – Alan Friedman (for YIPE!)
- Engineers – Acar S. Key, Bruce Miller
- Mixing – Bob Miller
- Keyboards – David Cole
- Drums – Robert Clivillés
- Vocal arrangement – Mariah Carey, David Cole
- Background vocals – Mariah Carey, Trey Lorenz, David Cole

== Charts ==
Weekly chart performance
Chart (1991)	Peak position
Australia (ARIA)	11
Belgium (Ultratop 50 Flanders)	49
Canada Top Singles (RPM)	1
Canada Adult Contemporary (RPM)	2
Canada Dance/Urban (RPM)	3
Canada Retail Singles (The Record)	3
Canada Contemporary Hit Radio (The Record)	1
Europe (Eurochart Hot 100)	32
Europe (European Dance Radio)	2
Europe (European Hit Radio)	2
Germany (GfK)	39
Germany Airplay (Media Control)	7
Greece (IFPI)	3
Iceland (Íslenski Listinn Topp 10)	1
Ireland (IRMA)	27
Israel (Israeli Singles Chart)	7
Japan (Oricon)	90
Luxembourg (Radio Luxembourg)	13
Netherlands (Dutch Top 40)	9
Netherlands (Single Top 100)	13
New Zealand (Recorded Music NZ)	3
Norway Airplay (Radio Topp 20)	3
Panama (UPI)	6
Sweden (Sverigetopplistan)	30
Sweden Airplay (Airplay Sweden)	4
Switzerland Airplay (Media Control)	6
UK Singles (Official Charts)	17
UK Dance (CIN)	17
UK Singles (MRIB)	16
UK Club (Music Week) Mixes	21
UK Airplay (ERA)	4
UK Airplay (Music & Media)	3
US Hot 100 Singles (Billboard)	1
US Hot Adult Contemporary (Billboard)	3
US Hot Dance Music Club Play (Billboard)	1
US Hot Dance Music 12-inch Singles Sales (Billboard)	4
US Hot R&B Singles (Billboard)	1
US Top 40 Radio Monitor (Billboard)	1
US Top POS Singles Sales (Billboard)	10
US Cash Box Top 100	1
US Top 100 R&B Singles (Cash Box)	2
US Top 30 Dance Singles (Cash Box)	7
US Adult Contemporary (Gavin Report)	3
US Top 40 (Gavin Report)	1
US Top 40/Urban Crossover (Gavin Report)	1
US Urban Contemporary (Gavin Report)	1
US Adult Contemporary (Radio & Records)	5
US Contemporary Hit Radio (Radio & Records)	1
US Urban Contemporary (Radio & Records)	1

Chart (2015)	Peak position
South Korea International Download (Gaon)	64

Year-end chart performance
Chart (1991)	Position
Australia (ARIA)	91
Brazil (Brazilian Radio Airplay)	7
Canada Top Singles (RPM)	19
Canada Adult Contemporary (RPM)	27
Canada Dance/Urban (RPM)	35
Canada Retail Singles (The Record)	23
Europe (European Hit Radio)	35
Israel (Israeli Singles Chart)	28
Netherlands (Dutch Top 40)	102
US Billboard Hot 100	22
US Adult Contemporary (Billboard)	45
US Cash Box Top 100	16
US Adult Contemporary (Gavin Report)	51
US Adult Contemporary (Radio & Records)	50
US Contemporary Hit Radio (Radio & Records)	12
US Hot R&B Singles (Billboard)	32
US Top 40 (Gavin Report)	16
US Urban (Radio & Records)	17
US Urban Contemporary (Gavin Report)	4

== Certifications ==
Certifications for "Emotions"
Region	Certification	Certified units/sales
Australia (ARIA)	Gold	35,000^{‡}
New Zealand (RMNZ)	Gold	15,000^{‡}
United Kingdom (BPI)	Silver	200,000^{‡}
United States (RIAA)	Platinum	1,000,000^{‡}
^{‡} Sales+streaming figures based on certification alone.

== Release history ==
Release dates and formats for "Emotions"
Region	Date	Format(s)	Label(s)	Ref.
United States	August 14, 1991	7-inch vinyl; cassette	Columbia	
Japan	September 12, 1991	Mini CD	Sony Music Japan	
Australia	September 16, 1991	CD; cassette	Sony Music Australia	
United Kingdom	September 23, 1991	7-inch vinyl; 12-inch vinyl; cassette; CD	Columbia	
United States	October 15, 1991	CD	Columbia	
United States	October 29, 1991	12-inch vinyl; maxi cassette	Columbia	
Australia	November 18, 1991	12-inch vinyl; CD; cassette	Sony Music Australia	
United States	March 5, 2002	CD (reissue)	Columbia	
Canada	March 4, 2003	CD (reissue)	Columbia	

== See also ==
- List of Billboard Hot 100 number-one singles of 1991
