= MTV Unplugged (Mariah Carey EP) =

1992 live EP by Mariah Carey

EP / live album by Mariah Carey
- Released: June 2, 1992
- Recorded: March 16, 1992
- Studios: Kaufman Astoria Studios (Astoria, New York)
- Genres: Gospel; soul; R&B
- Length: 28:45
- Label: Columbia
- Producers: Mariah Carey; Walter Afanasieff

Mariah Carey chronology
Emotions (1991)	MTV Unplugged (1992)	Music Box (1993)

Mariah Carey video chronology
The First Vision (1991)	MTV Unplugged +3 (1992)	Here Is Mariah Carey (1993)

Singles from MTV Unplugged
- 1. "I'll Be There" Released: May 26, 1992; 2. "If It's Over" Released: August 28, 1992

MTV Unplugged is a live extended play (EP) by American singer-songwriter Mariah Carey, released in the United States on June 2, 1992, by Columbia Records. Following the success of Carey's previous two albums and the growing critical commentary on her lack of concert tours and unsubstantial televised performances, Sony organized a live performance show at the Kaufman Astoria Studios, New York on March 16, 1992. The show, titled MTV Unplugged, originally aired on MTV to help promote Carey's second album Emotions, as well as help shun critics who deemed Carey a possible studio artist. However, after its success, the show was released to the public as an EP, with an accompanying VHS titled MTV Unplugged +3.

Upon release, the EP garnered generally positive reviews from music critics, many of whom complimented Carey's vocals. Commercially, the album was a success, peaking at number three on the US Billboard 200, and was certified 4× Platinum by the Recording Industry Association of America (RIAA), denoting shipments of two million copies within the United States. Additionally, the EP experienced strong success in several international markets, such as the Netherlands and New Zealand, where it reached number one and were certified 2× Platinum. MTV Unplugged peaked within the top-five in the United Kingdom, and in the-top ten in Australia and Canada.

"I'll Be There" was chosen as the lead single from the album. Due to its critical success until that point, it was released one month before its parent EP, eventually becoming Carey's sixth chart-topper in the United States, and one of the few songs to do so by two different acts. Globally, the song was successful, topping the charts in Canada, the Netherlands and New Zealand, as well as reaching the top-five in Ireland and the United Kingdom. After its success, "If It's Over", a song from Carey's second studio effort Emotions was released, due to its exposure on the show and EP.

== Background ==
After the release of Carey's second studio album, Emotions (1991), critics began wondering whether Carey would finally embark on a worldwide tour, having not toured to promote her self-titled debut album. Although Carey had done several sporadic award show appearances, as well as television program performances, critics began accusing Carey of being a studio artist, not capable of delivering or replicating the same quality vocals live, especially her whistle register. During several televised interviews, Carey addressed the accusations, claiming that she did not tour out of fear of the long travel times and distances, as well as the strain on her voice performing her songs back-to-back. However, in hopes of putting any claims of her being a manufactured artist to rest, Carey and Walter Afanasieff decided to book an appearance on MTV Unplugged, a television program aired by MTV. The show's purpose was to present name artists, and feature them "unplugged" or stripped of studio equipment. While live, the show allowed several musicians and back up vocalists, while recorded in an acoustic setting. The issues Carey faced once the show was booked was the content; she didn't know what material to present at the intimate concert. While Carey felt strongly of her more soulful and powerful songs, it was decided that her most popular content to that point would be included. Days prior to the show's taping, Carey and Afanasieff thought of adding a cover version of an older song, in order to provide something different and unexpected. They chose "I'll Be There", a song made popular by The Jackson 5 in 1970, rehearsing it few times before the night of the show.

== Synopsis ==
"I'll Be There"
A sample from the live performance of the song. It was released as a single, without being re-recorded at a studio. The snippet features Carey's second verse, which was originally sung by Michael Jackson in 1970.

Carey's performance was recorded on March 16, 1992, at Kaufman Astoria Studios in Queens, New York. The show featured a number of musicians, back-up vocalists and just a crew of ten, for filming and recording. Directed by Larry Jordan, who previously worked with Carey on the music video for "Someday". Dana Jon Chapelle was chosen as the sound mixer, having worked with Carey on her previous two studio albums.

The show began with the song "Emotions" Carey entered the studio dressed in a black jacket and matching pants and boots. Prior to the song's studio introduction, Carey opened the song with an impromptu gospel and a cappella number, eventually leading to the song's chorus led by David Cole. This is the only song from the performance that was filmed in two takes, since the first was not to Mariah's liking. After the song, Carey introduced the band and staff; to her left was a four-piece string section with Belinda Whitney Barnett, Cecilia Hobbs-Gardner, Wince Garvey and Laura Corcos, while San Shea played the harpsichord and harmonium. The show's rhythm section was led by Gigi Gonaway on the drums, Randy Jackson on bass, Vernon Black on guitar, and Sammy Figueroa and Ren Klyce, both percussionists. Additionally, Carey had ten background singers on stage, led by Trey Lorenz and Patrique McMillan.

The next song on the set-list was "If It's Over", a collaboration with Carole King. Walter Afanasieff replaced Cole on the piano, during which time a set of five male musicians were brought on stage. They were Lew Delgado, baritone saxophone; Lenny Pickett, tenor saxophone; George Young, alto saxophone; Earl Gardner, trumpet; and Steve Turre, trombone. They had been present during Carey's live performance of the song on Saturday Night Live a few months prior. As Carey introduced the song, she said "this next song I wrote with one of my idols, Carole King", beginning the performance shortly after.

For "Someday", Cole returned to the stage, replacing Afanasieff on the keyboard. During the song, Carey would often place her index finger over her left ear, especially while using the whistle register. She later explained to the audience that it would help her in hearing herself more precisely, something needed to properly execute a higher ranged note.

Once again, as Carey began "Vision of Love", her "first single ever", Afansieff swapped positions with Cole. The performance varied heavily from the studio version, as it was more low key and only used voices in a cappella form, without any heavy instrumentation. Prior to beginning the fifth song on the set-list, "Make It Happen", Afanasieff shared the organ with Cole, playing the bass while the latter handled the treble. After the song began, the back-up began "piling their vocals" over Carey's, according to author Chris Nickson, and allowed the song to attain a more "churchy feel". He felt the song was superior to the studio version, due to its stripped performance and vocals:

"The roughness of this version succeeded in a way the recorded version on 'Emotions' could never manage. In the sterile atmosphere of a studio, where perfection, technology, and overdubbing were the rules, spontaneity had no place. On the stage, it was valued, and this performance had it. Everyone pushed everyone just a little further, to create something wonderful, and judging by the response, the audience realized it, as did Mariah when the song was finished."

Soon after completing "Make It Happen", Carey eagerly presented the final song on the set list, "I'll Be There". The way the song was arranged, Carey took Michael Jackson's lead, while Trey Lorenz sang the second lead, originally sung by Jermaine Jackson. After performing the song alongside a very simple arrangement and minimal instrumentals, the back-up singers began humming to the tune of "Can't Let Go", leading Carey to present "another final" song for the show. Several days after the concert, Carey sat down with Melinda Newman from Billboard, telling her of the experience recording the show, as well as her view on it from a creative perspective. She said "Unplugged taught me a lot about myself because I tend to nitpick everything I do and make it a bit too perfect because I'm a perfectionist. I'll always go over the raw stuff, and now I've gotten to the point where I understand the raw stuff is usually better."

== Release ==
Originally, MTV planned to air the show several times during April 1992, it was normal for MTV Unplugged sessions to air around six times during the month of release, before being archived. Carey's version was met with critical acclaim and extended popularity, leading to it being shown more often than usual. Fans from around the United States made multiple requests for the show to be aired on television, and by the end of April 1992, Carey's episode of MTV Unplugged had aired over three-times as much as an average episode would. The concert's success tempted Sony officials to use it as some form of an album. However, Carey and Afansieff were already making headway on a new album set tentatively for release in 1993. This being so, Sony decided to release it as an EP, selling for a reduced price due to its shorter length. It became available for digital download on the iTunes Store on December 7, 2021.

=== Video ===
After the success of the EP's lead single "I'll Be There", Sony chose to release not only the EP, but a VHS accompaniment package; a video of the actual concert titled MTV Unplugged +3. Aside from featuring the seven song's performed at Kaufman Astoria Studios, it held three music videos; "Can't Let Go", "Make It Happen", and a rare remix version and video of "Emotions". The video peaked atop the Billboard video chart, and was certified Platinum by the RIAA, denoting shipments of 100,000 units throughout the United States.

MTV Unplugged +3 garnered generally positive reviews from music critics. Allmusic editor Shawn M. Haney gave the video three out of five stars, praising Carey's vocals as well as her cover of "I'll Be There". Haney wrote "Gradually, the power and esteem of these tales lift to new heights and remain at a peak with the breathtaking, moment-making performance of "I'll Be There," a charming song first cut by The Jackson 5." Writing for the St. Petersburg Times, Sabrina Miller called Carey an "artiste" and wrote "Programs like MTV Unplugged showcase talent like hers with an exclamation point." Journalist and writer from The New York Times Jon Pareles branded the performance "shrewd", and claimed Carey's cover of "I'll Be There" "set off fireworks". A writer for Entertainment Weekly called the show a "vocal Tour de force", and wrote "in addition to her breathtaking pipes, she has developed a commanding stage presence." Additionally, they felt Carey's performance of "I'll Be There" was "killer" and concluded their review with "In the process, this rare public appearance reminded us there was a big-league performer inside that party dress."

== Singles ==
After the decision to release the EP was made, Sony decided to release Carey's live version of "I'll Be There" as the only single, due to its critical success. The song debuted at number thirteen on the Billboard Hot 100, becoming Carey's highest debut on the chart at the time. After four weeks, the song topped the chart, becoming Carey's sixth number one song in the United States, and spending two weeks there. Its success across the globe was strong, peaking at number one in Canada, the Netherlands, and New Zealand; as well as reaching number two and three in the United Kingdom and Ireland, respectively; it also reached the top-ten in Australia, Belgium, Norway and Poland. "I'll Be There" was certified Gold by both the Australian Recording Industry Association and Recording Industry Association of New Zealand, denoting shipments of 35,000 and 7,500 units of the song in their respective countries. After its success, "If It's Over", a song from Carey's second studio effort Emotions was released, due to its exposure on the show and EP. It was given a very limited release, and only charted in Australia and the Netherlands, peaking at numbers 115 and 80, respectively.

== Critical reception ==
Professional ratings
Contemporaneous
Review scores
Source	Rating
Boston Herald	A−
The Buffalo News	4/5 stars
Fresno Bee	2/4 stars
Los Angeles Daily News	4/4 stars
Los Angeles Times	3/4 stars
The Philadelphia Inquirer	1/4 stars
Q	3/5 stars
The Record	3/4 stars
San Jose Mercury News	1.5/4 stars
St. Petersburg Times	4/5 stars

MTV Unplugged garnered generally positive reviews from music critics. AllMusic editor Shawn M. Haney gave the album three out of five stars, praising Carey's vocals as well as her cover of "I'll Be There". Haney wrote "Gradually, the power and esteem of these tales lift to new heights and remain at a peak with the breathtaking, moment-making performance of "I'll Be There," a charming song first cut by the Jackson 5." Writing for the St. Petersburg Times, Sabrina Miller called Carey an "artiste" and wrote "Programs like MTV Unplugged showcase talent like hers with an exclamation point." Journalist and writer from The New York Times Jon Pareles branded the performance "shrewd," and claimed Carey's cover of I'll be There" "set off fireworks." A writer for Entertainment Weekly called the show a "vocal Tour de force," and wrote "in addition to her breathtaking pipes, she has developed a commanding stage presence." Additionally, they felt Carey's performance of "I'll Be There" was "killer" and concluded their review with "In the process, this rare public appearance reminded us there was a big-league performer inside that party dress." MTV Unplugged was included at number 10 in the Pazz & Jop Critics Poll list for the best EP's of 1992 along Erasure's Abba-esque. Carey was nominated for a Grammy Award for Best Female Pop Vocal Performance for the album.

=== Retrospective ===
Professional ratings
Retrospective
Review scores
Source	Rating
AllMusic	3.5/5 stars
MusicHound	3.5/5

Writing for MusicHound, Eric Deggans said "though the 26-plus people appearing on this disc seem to believe the Unplugged ethic, Carey's vibrant live performance is nearly worth the heresy."

== Commercial performance ==
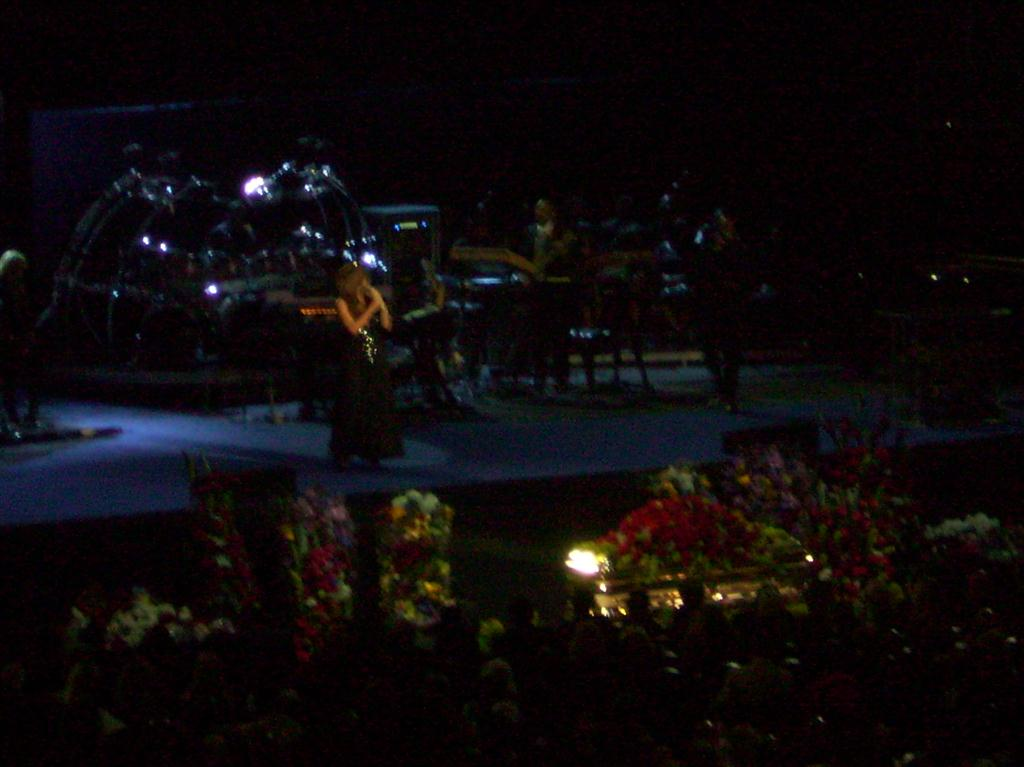
Carey alongside Lorenz, performing "I'll Be There" live during Michael Jackson's funeral reception in 2009.

=== North America ===
MTV Unplugged debuted at number eight on the US Billboard 200 with sales of 67,000 copies, on the week of June 20, 1992, becoming Carey's third consecutive top-ten album in the US. In its third week, the album peaked at number three, charting one spot higher than Emotions. In total, the album remained in the top-twenty for fourteen weeks, and on the chart for fifty-seven (making one re-entry). MTV Unplugged was certified four times Platinum by the Recording Industry Association of America (RIAA), denoting shipment of two million copies throughout the country. As of November 2018, Nielsen SoundScan estimates actual sales of the album at 2.8 million in the United States. On June 20, 1992, MTV Unplugged entered the Canadian RPM Singles Chart at number thirty-seven, eventually peaking at number six five weeks later, becoming also Carey's third consecutive top-ten album in Canada. During the week of November 22, 1992, the album spent its last week on the chart, exiting at number eighty-seven after spending twenty-four weeks on the album's chart. To date, the album has been certified Platinum by the Canadian Recording Industry Association (CRIA), denoting shipments of 70,000 units throughout the country.

=== Europe and Oceania ===
Outside the United States, the album experienced success in several European markets. In Austria, MTV Unplugged entered the albums chart at number thirty-nine, eventually peaking number twenty-one and spending a total of ten weeks on the chart. In France, the album peaked at number twenty-two, and was certified double-Gold by the Syndicat National de l'Édition Phonographique (SNEP), with estimated sales of 144,000 copies. In the Netherlands, the EP entered the MegaCharts at number sixty-six during the week of June 20, 1992. It eventually peaked at number one, staying there for three consecutive weeks, and a total of 116 weeks on the chart. The Nederlandse Vereniging van Producenten en Importeurs van beeld- en geluidsdragers (NVPI) certified the album double-Platinum, denoting shipments of 200,000 units throughout the country. On the Swiss Albums Chart dated September 13, 1992, the album reached its peak position of number nineteen. After only five weeks charting within the country, it was certified Gold by the International Federation of the Phonographic Industry (IFPI). In the United Kingdom, the album debuted and peaked at number three on the UK Albums Chart, during the week dated July 18, 1992. After spending ten weeks on the chart, the album was certified Gold by the British Phonographic Industry (BPI), denoting shipments of 100,000 units.

In Australia, the album debuted at number thirty-four on the ARIA Charts, during the week ending July 12, 1992. Weeks later, it peaked at number seven, where it remained for four consecutive weeks, and a total of twenty-five weeks in the top 50, and thiry-three weeks in the top 100. The album was certified Platinum by the Australian Recording Industry Association (ARIA), denoting shipments of 70,000 copies. MTV Unplugged entered the New Zealand Albums Chart at number four during the week of August 2, 1992. After spending three weeks at number one, and a total of nineteen in the chart, the album was certified double-Platinum by the Recording Industry Association of New Zealand (RIANZ).

== Track listing ==
MTV Unplugged
No.	Title	Writer(s)	Length
1.	"Emotions"	Mariah Carey; David Cole; Robert Clivillés	4:00
2.	"If It's Over"	Carey; Carole King	3:48
3.	"Someday"	Carey; Ben Margulies	3:57
4.	"Vision of Love"	Carey; Margulies	3:36
5.	"Make It Happen"	Carey; Cole	4:16
6.	"I'll Be There" (featuring Trey Lorenz)	Berry Gordy; Bob West; Hal Davis; Willie Hutch	4:42
7.	"Can't Let Go"	Carey; Walter Afanasieff	4:35
Total length:			28:45

MTV Unplugged +3 – Video release
No.	Title	Length
8.	"Make It Happen" (music video)	5:27
9.	"Can't Let Go" (music video)	3:49
10.	"Emotions" (12" club video edit)	4:58

== Personnel ==
Credits for MTV Unplugged adapted from AllMusic.

- Mariah Carey – arranger, producer, vocals
- Walter Afanasieff – arranger, piano, producer
- Vernon "Ice" Black – guitar
- Henry Casper – background vocals
- David Cole – piano
- Laura Corcos – strings
- Melonie Daniels – background vocals
- Lew Del Gatto – baritone saxophone
- Darryl Douglass Workshop Company – background vocals
- Sammy Figueroa – percussion
- Earl Gardner – trumpet
- Winterton Garvey – strings
- Greg "Gigi" Gonaway – Drums
- Peggy Harley – background vocals
- David Hewitt – engineer
- Cecilia Hobbs – strings
- Randy Jackson – bass
- Ren Klyce – bells, celeste, timpani
- Trey Lorenz – vocals
- Patrique McMillian – vocals
- Geno Morris – vocals
- Peter Moshay – production coordination
- Lenny Pickett – tenor saxophone
- Cheree Price – background vocals
- Kelly Price – background vocals
- Dan Shea – harmonium, harpsichord
- Liz Stewart – background vocals
- Steve Turre – trombone
- Spencer Washington – background vocals
- Belinda Whitney-Barratt – strings
- George Young – alto saxophone

== Charts ==
=== Weekly charts ===
Chart (1992–1993)	Peak position
Australian Albums (ARIA)	7
Austrian Albums (Ö3 Austria)	21
Canada Top Albums/CDs (RPM)	6
Canadian Albums (The Record)	11
Dutch Albums (Album Top 100)	1
Dutch Albums (Stichting Nederlandse Top 40)	1
European Top 100 Albums (Music & Media)	8
French Albums (SNEP)	22
German Albums (Offizielle Top 100)	31
Japanese Albums (Oricon)	13
New Zealand Albums (RMNZ)	1
Norwegian Albums (VG-lista)	18
Swedish Albums (Sverigetopplistan)	36
Swiss Albums (Schweizer Hitparade)	19
UK Albums (Official Charts)	3
UK Albums (MRIB)	2
US Billboard 200	3
US Top R&B/Hip-Hop Albums (Billboard)	16
US Top 200 Pop Albums (Cash Box)	1
US Top 75 R&B Albums (Cash Box)	5

Chart (1994–1995)	Peak position
German Albums (Offizielle Top 100)	30
Dutch Albums (Album Top 100)	21
UK R&B Albums (Official Charts)	22

Chart (2020–2022)	Peak position
Greek Albums (IFPI)	27
UK R&B Albums (Official Charts)	24
US Vinyl Albums (Billboard)	10

=== Year-end charts ===
Chart (1992)	Position
Australian Albums (ARIA)	25
Canada Top Albums/CDs (RPM)	34
Dutch Albums (MegaCharts)	10
European Top 100 Albums (Music & Media)	65
Japanese Albums (Oricon)	96
New Zealand (RMNZ)	34
US Billboard 200	35
US Top R&B/Hip-Hop Albums (Billboard)	76

Chart (1993)	Position
Dutch Albums (MegaCharts)	31

Chart (1994)	Position
Dutch Albums (MegaCharts)	26
German Albums (Offizielle Top 100)	80

Chart (1995)	Position
Dutch Albums (MegaCharts)	96

== Certifications and sales ==
Region	Certification	Certified units/sales
Australia (ARIA)	2× Platinum	140,000^{‡}
Canada (Music Canada)	Platinum	100,000^{^}
France (SNEP)	2× Gold	200,000^{*}
Japan (RIAJ)	2× Platinum	400,000^{^}
Netherlands (NVPI)	2× Platinum	200,000^{^}
New Zealand (RMNZ)	Gold	7,500^{^}
Switzerland (IFPI Switzerland)	Gold	25,000^{^}
United Kingdom (BPI)	Gold	100,000^{^}
United States (RIAA)	4× Platinum	2,800,000
United States (RIAA) Video	Platinum	100,000^{^}
Summaries
Worldwide	—	7,000,000
^{*} Sales figures based on certification alone.^{^} Shipments figures based on certification alone.^{‡} Sales+streaming figures based on certification alone.

== Works cited ==
- Larkin, Colin, ed. (2000). The Virgin Encyclopedia of Nineties Music. London: Virgin Books. ISBN 0-7535-0427-8. OL 10823303M.
- Nickson, Chris (1998). Mariah Carey Revisited: Her Story. New York: St. Martin's Griffin. ISBN 0-312-19512-5. OL 363685M.
- Deggans, Eric (1998). "Mariah Carey". In Graff, Gary; Freedom du Lac, Josh; McFarlin, Jim (eds.). MusicHound R&B: The Essential Album Guide. Detroit: Visible Ink Press. pp. 96–97. ISBN 1-57859-026-4. OL 690592M.
