= Gigi Gonaway =

American drummer and percussionist

Gregory Gigi Gonaway
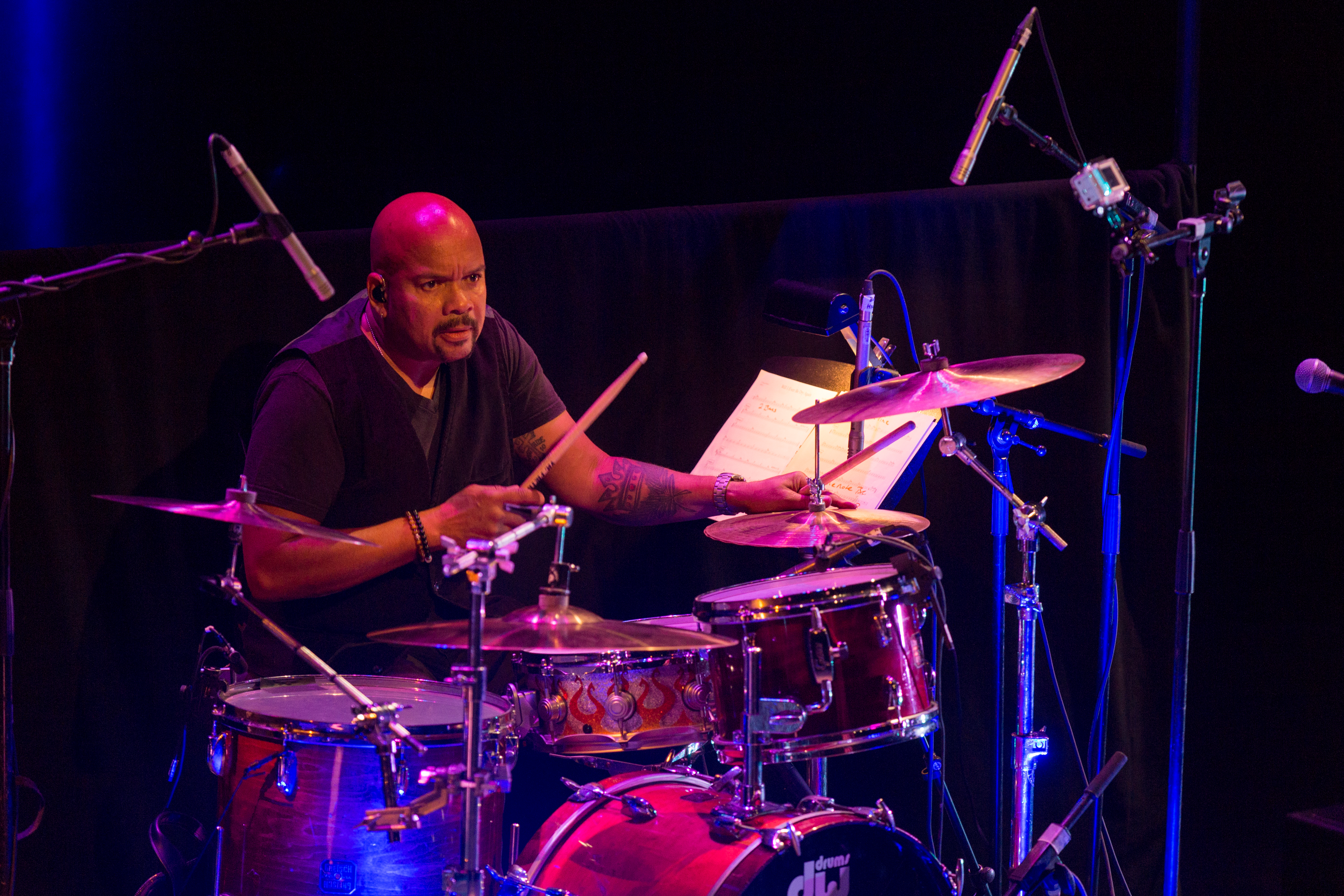
- Greg "Gigi" Gonaway at the Tempe Center for the Arts in 2015

Background information
- Born: Gregory Gonaway; Phoenix, Arizona, U.S.
- Genres: R&B; pop; soul; rock
- Instruments: Drums; percussion

Gregory "Gigi" Gonaway is an American drummer and percussionist, born in Phoenix, Arizona. He has been making music since the 1970s and has played drums on recordings with artists including Whitney Houston, Aretha Franklin, George Benson, Natalie Cole, and Steve Winwood. Gonaway has toured extensively with Mariah Carey and Clarence Clemons.

He was a protégé of Narada Michael Walden's in the 1980s and 1990s and worked at Tarpan recording studio with Walden on most of the major label acts he produced. Walden was an established music producer and drummer, and took Gonaway under his wing as he said he reminded him of himself when he was a young drummer just starting out. Gonaway attributes much of his success to Walden.

== Early years ==
Gonaway's father, Eldridge Gonaway, was an attorney and city developer. His mother, Lois (née Warrior), is a retired registered nurse.

Gonaway began playing drums at age ten. His parents relocated from Arizona to the San Francisco Bay Area in California, where he attended a Catholic high school, Saint Mary's College High School. There, he learned to read, write, and arrange music under the guidance of Bob Barrett. He also played in the school's jazz band.

Gonaway's first band was called Sapphire, which played the nightclub scene in Oakland. Later he formed the jazz fusion band Iz Kidz, which performed regularly in the San Francisco Bay Area.

While performing in Iz Kidz, in Oakland, California, Gonaway was introduced to Narada Michael Walden, who took an interest in his drumming skills. Shortly afterwards, Walden hired him at his recording studio. Walden would later open Tarpan studio in San Rafael, California. Part of Gonaway's job was running errands and providing transportation to recording artists to and from the recording studio. Before long, Walden was teaching him how to create beats on the drum machine and letting him play drum tracks on albums with Aretha Franklin and George Benson.

=== Session work and touring ===
Walden mentored Gonaway in many areas of his musicianship, including becoming a more diverse drummer, developing programming skills, and understanding the importance of production in the studio. Eventually, Gonaway was participating in Walden's recording projects for projects including recording artists Aretha Franklin, George Benson, Kenny G, and George Michael.

== Mariah Carey ==
In early 1990, Mariah Carey and producer Walter Afanasieff formed the original Mariah Carey band, which included Gonaway, Randy Jackson, Vernon Black, Ren Klyce, Dan Shea, Peter Michael Escovedo and engineer Dana John Chappelle. Gonaway's first televised performances with Carey were on The Arsenio Hall Show, and later her controversial appearance on The Oprah Winfrey Show, on which she discussed her racial makeup. Gonaway toured with Carey from 1990 to 2005.

== The Aaron Hendra Project ==
Gonaway began playing drums with singer-songwriter Aaron Hendra in 2009, in a group which would later be named the Aaron Hendra Project.

Hendra is married to reality TV actress Tiffany Hendra of The Real Housewives of Dallas. Tiffany organized a charitable event on at the House of Blues in Dallas, Texas, at which Gonaway performed with the Aaron Hendra Project at the Light Up Tomorrow event, to raise fundsto build state-of-the-art, off-grid solar farms in various East African orphanages, schools, and facilities. The project was built and managed by Sam Childers, the "machine gun preacher," through the Angels for East Africa organization. The live performance aired on Season 1, Episode 7 of The Real Housewives of Dallas.

Hendra and Gonaway also appeared in the romantic comedy film Slightly Single in L.A. in 2013, performing live as the Aaron Hendra Project.

== Film appearances ==
Gonaway appeared in the Whitney Houston music video for "I Get So Emotional", playing percussion in 1987, and in Mariah Carey's MTV Unplugged live recording as the drummer in 1992. Aaron Hendra and Gonaway appeared in the quirky romantic comedy Slightly Single in L.A. in 2013, and on Bravo's The Real Housewives of Dallas in 2016, performing live as the Aaron Hendra Project.

== Product endorsements ==
- Drum Workshop (DW)
- Remo Drumheads
- Vic Firth
- Paiste

== Discography ==
- 2017 - Scorpio - Blaine Long - drums
- 2016 - Elvis Monroe - Elvis Monroe - drums
- 2014 - Face the Music - Nils Lofgren - drums
- 2013- Octobersong - The Aaron Hendra Project - drums
- 2012 - Knew You Were Waiting: The Best of Aretha Franklin 1980-1998 - Aretha Franklin - percussion
- 2009 - The Collection 2009 - Whitney Houston - electronic percussion
- 2007 - Best When Lived (Life Is) - Greg Johnson - producer, drums, percussion
- 2006 - Destination You - Linda Imperial - drums, percussion
- 2005 - Favorites 1990-2005 - Nils Lofgren - drums
- 2004 - Kathi McDonald - Kathi McDonald - drums
- 2004 - Very Best of George Benson: The Greatest Hits of All - George Benson - drums, cymbals, and percussion
- 2003 - The Greatest Hits of All - George Benson - drums, cymbals, and percussion
- 2002 - Life and Love - Philip Bailey - drums, writer
- 2000 - The George Benson Anthology - George Benson - cymbals, electronic percussion
- 1998 - Best Kept Secret - Positive ID - drums, percussion
- 1998 - Phoenix Rising - The Temptations - cymbals
- 1998 - VH1 Divas Live - drums
- 1997 - Junction Seven - Steve Winwood - MIDI drums, percussion
- 1995 - Chill - Lenny Williams - producer, arranger, drums, percussion
- 1995 - The Best of George Benson (Warner Bros.) - George Benson - cymbals
- 1994 - Greatest Hits: 1980-1994 - Aretha Franklin - percussion
- 1992 - MTV_Unplugged - Mariah Carey - drums
- 1991 - Time, Love and Tenderness - Michael Bolton - timbales
- 1991 - Retrogroove Artifact - Rhythmtown Jive - percussion
- 1991 - Silver Lining - Nils Lofgren - drums
- 1990 - It's Supposed to Be Fun - Lou Rawls - percussion
- 1989 - Stay With Me - Regina Belle - drums - gold record
- 1989 - D'Atra Hicks - D'Atra Hicks - cymbals
- 1989 - Good to Be Back - Natalie Cole - cymbals
- 1989 - Night with Mr. C - Clarence Clemons - cymbals, percussion, performer, primary artist
- 1989 - So Happy - Eddie Murphy - percussion
- 1989 - Through the Storm - Aretha Franklin - percussion, cymbals
- 1989 - Pia Z - Pia Zadora - cymbals, percussion
- 1987 - Whitney - Whitney Houston - percussion
- 1986 - Aretha 1986 - Aretha Franklin - percussion, vocals (background)
- 1986 - Duotones - Kenny G - drums, percussion
- 1986 - Frantic Romantic - Jermaine Stewart - percussion, electronic drum fills
- 1986 - While the City Sleeps - George Benson - synthesizer, drums, cymbals, percussion, drum fills
- 1985 - Hero - Clarence Clemons & the Red Bank Rockers - percussion
- 1985 - Who's Zoomin' Who? - Aretha Franklin - percussion
- 1980 - Aretha 1980 - Aretha Franklin - percussion
- 1980 - Life Is Good - Jimmy Mac - drums
