= Jim Sonzero =

American film director

Jim Sonzero is an American music video and film director. He co-directed Mariah Carey's "Can't Let Go." His feature length directorial debut was Pulse, a horror film starring Kristen Bell. He was the cutscene director for Killzone 3 and Resident Evil 5.
