= Accrington Observer =

Weekly British newspaper in Accrington

- Type: Weekly newspaper
- Owner(s): Reach plc
- Circulation: 1,474 (as of 2023)
- Website: lancs.live/all-about/accrington

The Accrington Observer is a weekly paper featuring the town of Accrington and its surrounding areas. It is published by Reach plc.

The Accrington Observer is the sister paper of the Rossendale Free Press.
