= Vision of Love =

1990 single by Mariah Carey

- North American cassette cover (Note: US promotional CD single uses the same image but with different formatting, while international pressings feature Carey posing differently.)

Single by Mariah Carey

from the album Mariah Carey
- B-side: "Sent from Up Above"; "Prisoner"/"All in Your Mind"/"Someday" medley
- Released: May 15, 1990
- Recorded: 1989
- Studio: Skyline (New York City)
- Genre: Pop; soul; R&B
- Length: 3:29
- Label: Columbia
- Composers: Mariah Carey; Ben Margulies
- Lyricist: Mariah Carey
- Producers: Rhett Lawrence; Narada Michael Walden

Mariah Carey singles chronology
| "Vision of Love" (1990) | "Love Takes Time" (1990) |

Music video
- "Vision of Love" on YouTube

"Vision of Love" is the debut single by the American singer-songwriter Mariah Carey, released on May 15, 1990, for her first album Mariah Carey. It was written by Carey and Ben Margulies, and produced by Rhett Lawrence and Narada Michael Walden through Columbia Records. The slow dance song introduces her whistle register vocal embellishments. The lyrics of the song represent her past life filled with "alienation", and how she had dreamed of achieving her triumph over adversity up to the moment when it finally came to fruition as the "vision of love" that she had always believed in.

"Vision of Love" received universal acclaim from music critics, being praised for Carey's showy vocals and her wide singing range. It has been credited with popularizing the use of melisma in contemporary popular music and for inspiring several artists to pursue a music career. The New Yorker named "Vision of Love" the "Magna Carta of melisma" for it and Carey's influence on pop and R&B singers and American Idol contestants. Additionally, Rolling Stone said that "the fluttering strings of notes that decorate songs like 'Vision of Love', inspired the entire American Idol vocal school, for better or worse, and virtually every other female R&B singer since the nineties." The song became her first number-one single in Canada, New Zealand, and the United States.

The accompanying music video for "Vision of Love" was filmed in April 1990. It features Carey in a large cathedral, where she meditates and sings by a large picture window. "Vision of Love" was performed on several television and award show ceremonies, such as The Arsenio Hall Show, Good Morning America, Saturday Night Live, and the 33rd Annual Grammy Awards. It has been performed at almost every one of Carey's concerts and tours, and is featured on her live album MTV Unplugged (1992) and on many of Carey's compilation albums including #1's (1998), Greatest Hits (2001) and The Ballads (2008).

== Background and recording ==
Throughout 1986, Carey had already begun writing music while in high school. After composing a song with her friend Gavin Christopher (of "Once You Get Started" fame), Carey met drummer and songwriter Ben Margulies. After initially meeting and becoming friends, the pair began spending time in his father's old studio, writing material and composing new songs. The first song they compiled together was titled "Here We Go Around Again." As the year wore on, they had composed seven songs for Carey's demo tape; among them was the rough and unfinished version of "Vision of Love". In an interview with Fred Bronson, Carey described how she met and came to work with Margulies:

"We needed someone to play keyboards for a song I did with Gavin Christopher. We called someone and he couldn't come, so by accident we stumbled on Ben. Ben came to the session, and he can't really play keyboards very well—he's really more of a drummer—but after that day, we kept in touch, and we just sort of clicked as writers.

After meeting Brenda K. Starr and being introduced to Tommy Mottola, the future head of Sony Music Entertainment (as well as Carey's future husband), the song was re-done in a professional studio, with the assistance of two producers. Carey flew to Los Angeles to work with Rhett Lawrence, one of the album's main producers. After hearing the original version of the song, Lawrence described it as having a "'50s sort of shuffle". After Carey agreed to alter the song, Lawrence contemporized its tempo. "Vision of Love" was recorded at the Skyline Studios in New York, and featured Lawrence at the keyboard, Margulies on the drums, bassist Marcus Miller, drum programmer Ren Klyce and guitarist Jimmy Ripp. Lawrence took Carey's vocals from the original demo version, and used them as background vocals for the song's final version. After adding different instrumentation to the song, Lawrence and Narada Michael Walden produced "Vision of Love."

== Music and lyrics ==
"Vision of Love"
A 23-second sample from "Vision of Love," featuring Carey's extensive use of melisma in the song

"Vision of Love" is a pop and R&B love song with gospel and soul influences. It incorporates heavy backup vocals during the song's bridge and features usage of Carey's whistle register and melisma. Author Chris Nickson described the song and its vocals:

"['Vision of Love'] was the perfect introduction to her voice. With an ideal slow-dancing tempo, it still managed to swing, with Mariah's background vocals (herself multi-tracked) answering her lead. On the final chorus, her voice flew towards those trademark high notes before the instruments drop out, leaving Mariah to sing her way out to the tune's climax alone."

Sheet music for "Vision of Love" shows the key of C major (C mixolydian) in common time. Carey's vocal range spans from the low-note of E♭_{3} to the high whistle note of C_{7}. The song's lyrics and melody were written and composed by Carey, with Margulies, Miller, Klyce and Rip on the instrumentals. Lawrence and Walden produced the song, which heavily deviated from its original version on Carey's demo. Michael Slezak from Entertainment Weekly wrote regarding the song's instrumentation and vocals: "From those opening sci-fi-esque synths to that signature dog-whistle high note, Mariah's very first single is inspired: Even folks who object to her trademark vocal excesses are hard-pressed to fault this rousing, gospel-tinged song about finding 'the one that I needed.'"

The lyrics of "Vision of Love" have been subject to various interpretations and suggested relationships by critics. Some have noted the relationship between Carey and God, while others point out one with a lover. Carey has yielded to both, while connecting them to her childhood and to obstacles encountered while growing up. Michael Slezak wrote: "Though it's not clear if she's celebrating a secular love or her relationship with a higher power, this exuberant ballad is a near-religious listening experience." In an interview with Ebony in 1991, Carey spoke of the song's lyrics and success:

Consider the lyrics: Prayed through the nights / Felt so alone / Suffered from alienation / Carried the weight on my own / Had to be strong / So I believed / And now I know I've succeeded / In finding the place I conceived. Well, just because you are young doesn't mean that you haven't had a hard life. It's been difficult for me, moving around so much, having to grow up by myself, basically on my own, my parents divorced. And I always felt kind of different from everyone else in my neighborhoods. I was a different person – ethnically. And sometimes that can be a problem. If you look a certain way everybody goes, "White girl", and I'd go, "No, that's not what I am."

According to Nickson, Carey chose to express her innermost feelings in her songs rather than becoming depressed and bitter throughout the hardships in her life. "You really have to look inside yourself and find your own inner strength, and say, "I'm proud of what I am and who I am, and I'm just going to be myself."

== Critical reception ==
Professional ratings
Review scores
| Source | Rating |
|---|---|
| Entertainment Weekly | A |
| Stereogum | 8/10 |

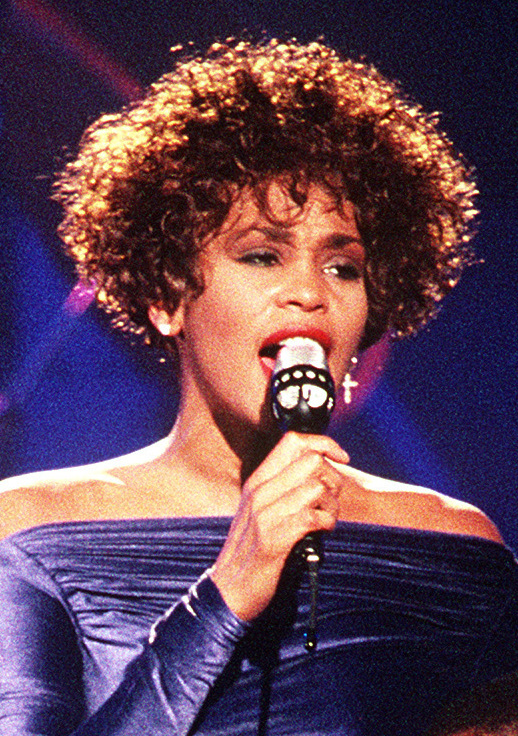
Critics positively compared Carey's stylistic use of melisma and wider range in the song to Whitney Houston.

"Vision of Love" received universal acclaim from music critics, who complimented its lyrical content as well as Carey's vocals and use of melisma. In 2019, Bill Lamb from About.com stated that "echoes of Whitney Houston's influence are evident, but the sheer power and swooping highs are all Mariah's own." He also named "Vision of Love" "one of the best songs" of the singer's recording career, and "simply one of the most stunning debut releases ever by a pop recording artist." Ashley S. Battel from AllMusic said that it is "memorable". Upon the release, J.D. Considine from The Baltimore Sun remarked the "stratospheric high notes" of the song. Billboard magazine described it as a "velvety stunner" and a "retro-flavored pop/R&B ballad". An editor, Bill Coleman, noted further that it "has all the elements necessary to propel newcomer to diva status: infectious melodies, lush instrumentation, and a vocal performance brimming with unbridled power and confidence." In a retrospective review on the album in 2005, Michael Slezak from Entertainment Weekly called the song "inspired" and complimented Carey's use of the whistle register. Pan-European magazine Music & Media described it as "a smouldering 'blue-eyed' soul ballad from a new artist with a strong voice." A reviewer from The Network Forty commented, "When this one comes on the air, you better stand clear of your speakers. Her voice will blow you away!"

In 2006, Sasha Frere-Jones from The New Yorker named the song "the Magna Carta of melisma" for both the song's and Carey's influence on pop and R&B singers and American Idol contestants. The Orlando Sentinel described it as a "1950s-styled ballad". People noted that Carey's "tone and clarity" makes it a "mesmerizing" song. Rolling Stone said that "the fluttering strings of notes that decorate songs like "Vision of Love", inspired the entire American Idol vocal school, for better or worse, and virtually every other female R&B singer since the nineties." Slant Magazine critic Rich Juzwiak wrote, "I think ["Vision of Love"] was a vision of the future world of American Idol." In a separate review from Slant, he wrote, "The last half of 'Vision Of Love' (starting with the belted bridge) is a series of crescendos that get so intense that another Mariah has to step in to keep up the momentum." Also Juzwiak complimented the usage of the whistle register in the song, "And then there's the whistle note. And then there's the final vocal run that's more like a roller-coaster track. If you think these aren't climaxes, she proves you wrong with her denouement, the way the last word, "be", sort of wanes into an "mm hmm hmm." Jonathan Bernstein from Spin declared it as a "remarkable" debut single, and "a song so unsingable that aspiring chanteuses the world over have respirators ready in case they fail to make it through to the other side of the bridge."

== Accolades ==
Awards and nominations for "Vision of Love"
| Year | Award | Category | Nominee(s) | Result | Ref. |
|---|---|---|---|---|---|
| 1991 | Grammy Award | Record of the Year | "Vision of Love" | Nominated | |
| 1991 | Grammy Award | Song of the Year | "Vision of Love" | Nominated | |
| 1991 | Grammy Award | Best Female Pop Vocal Performance | "Vision of Love" | Won | |
| 1991 | Soul Train Music Award | Best R&B/Soul Song of the Year | "Vision of Love" | Nominated | |
| 1991 | Soul Train Music Award | Best Female R&B/Soul Single | "Vision of Love" | Won | |
| 1991 | BMI Pop Award | Best Songwriter | Mariah Carey | Won | |

== Commercial performance ==
In the United States, "Vision of Love" entered the US Billboard Hot 100 chart at number 73 during the week of June 2, 1990, and reached the chart's summit nine weeks later. The song remained atop the chart for four consecutive weeks, and was ranked sixth on the Billboard Hot 100 year-end chart. After four weeks at number one, it fell to number eight, and spent seven weeks lingering within the top ten. It also topped the Hot R&B/Hip-Hop Songs for two weeks and Hot Adult Contemporary Tracks for three weeks. In October 2019, the Recording Industry Association of America (RIAA) certified the song platinum, denoting shipments of one million units. In Canada, "Vision of Love" entered the Canadian RPM Singles Chart at number 75, during the week of July 7, 1990. In its eighth week on the chart, the song reached number one, and remained on the chart for a total of 17 weeks. It finished eighth on the RPM year-end chart.

"Vision of Love" entered the Australian Singles Chart at number 67 during the week of August 5, 1990. It peaked at number nine, and spent a total of 19 weeks within the top 100. The Australian Recording Industry Association (ARIA) certified the single gold, denoting shipments of over 35,000 units. In New Zealand, the song spent two consecutive weeks atop the singles chart. After fluctuating within the chart for 24 weeks, it was certified gold by the Recording Industry Association of New Zealand (RIANZ), denoting shipments of over 7,500 units.

In the Netherlands, "Vision of Love" entered the Dutch Single Top 100 at number 99, during the week of July 14. It spent a total of 17 weeks on the chart, spending two weeks at its peak position of number eight. The song entered the French Singles Chart at number 39 on November 11. It peaked at number 25, spending two weeks at the position and a total of 14 on the chart. In Ireland, the song peaked at number ten, and spent six weeks charting. In the United Kingdom, the song entered the UK Singles Chart at number 74, during the week of August 4, 1990. It peaked at number nine in its seventh week, and spent a total of 12 weeks on the chart. According to the Official Charts Company (OCC), the single has sold over 198,000 units in the UK.

== Music video ==
=== Background ===
After completing the album, Sony hired Bojan Bazelli to direct the song's music video. After filming the video's first version, record label executives felt the result was sub-par in comparison to the quality of the music. They scrapped the first video and re-filmed it with director Andy Morahan, changing the plot, scenery and imagery. After word got out of the two videos, a Sony employee spoke to the press about Carey, saying how "the special treatment really upset" him. He felt they treated Carey differently from how they would another artist signed to the label, and that they viewed her as a higher priority. He also claimed that Carey was the reason they re-filmed, "they spend $200,000 on a video and Mariah doesn't like it. No big deal." Another employee estimated the figure of both videos at over $450,000. After the reports were made, Don Ienner, the president of Sony, refuted the claims, calling them "total bullshit" although admitting, "If we're going to take the time and effort that we did with Mariah, on every level, then we're going to image her the right way. If it costs a few extra dollars to make a splash in terms of the right imaging, you go ahead and do it."

=== Synopsis ===
The video takes place in a large cathedral-like room, with large winding staircases on each side. Throughout the video, the scenery changes several times from a cloudy and sunny day, to a glowing sunset. These time shifts are seen through a large carved window in the cathedral. The video begins with Carey's hair in long golden curls, and her wearing a skin-tight black jumper. She sits on the large ledge by the window, staring into the different colors in the sky. As the video progresses, Carey is joined by a small black cat, which accompanies her as she meditates on the large stairwell. After the song's second verse, a large microphone is seen in the middle of the room, where scenes of Carey singing and standing on the window's ledge interchange. The last scenes show Carey staring out into the meadow, smiling. According to author Chris Nickson, during the scenes of Carey by the large window, it is "obvious" that she is praying to God and connecting to her creator. He felt that alongside the song's lyrics of faith and prayer, the video's moments of meditation truly went "hand in hand."

== Live performances ==
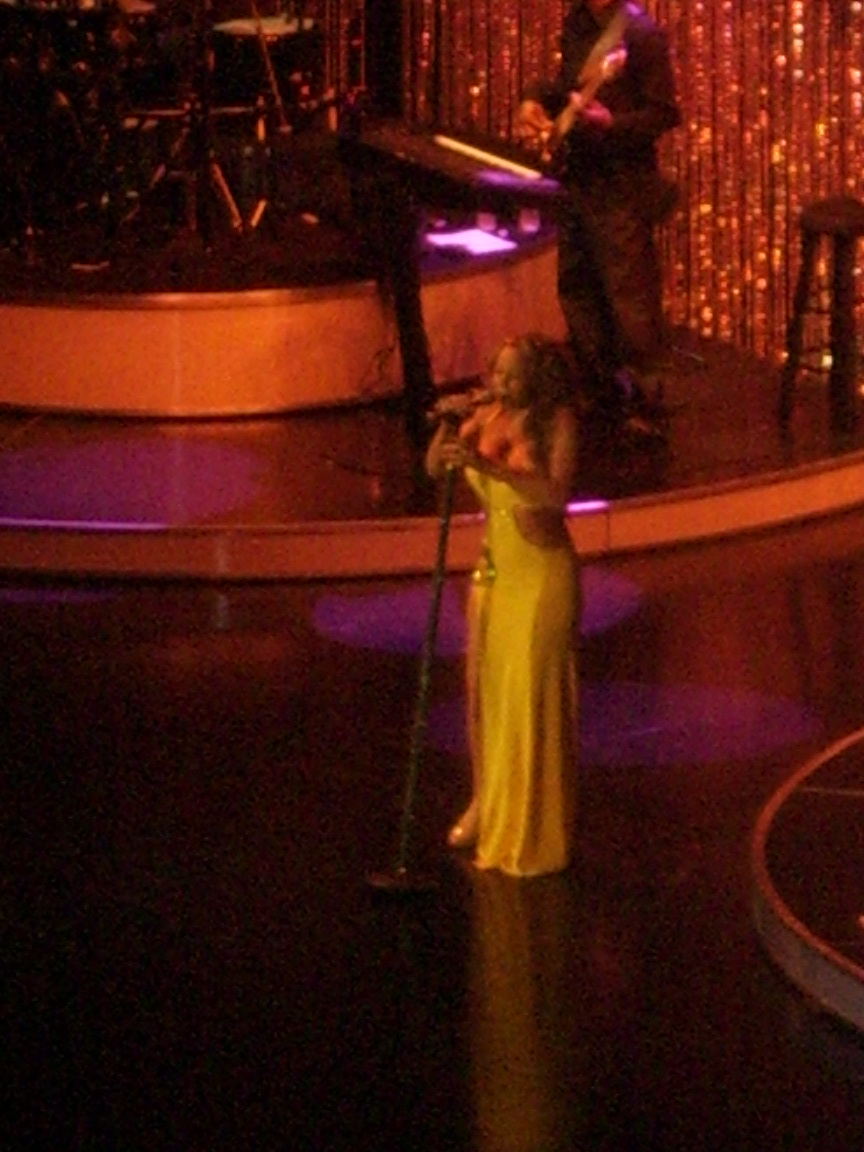
Carey performing "Vision of Love" during The Adventures of Mimi Tour

Serving as her debut single, Carey performed "Vision of Love" on several live television and award show appearances, both stateside and throughout Europe. Carey's first live performance of the song was on The Arsenio Hall Show, where she was joined on stage by the Billie T. Scott Ensemble, a trio of male background vocalists. Additionally, she sang it during a televised appearance at New York City's TATU Club, where she also gave a live rendition of Ben E. King's "Don't Play That Song (You Lied)". As part of a live segment and interview, Carey appeared on Good Morning America in July 1990, where she gave a live performance of the song. In the further months, Carey performed the song live on The Tonight Show Starring Johnny Carson, The Oprah Winfrey Show, the 33rd Annual Grammy Awards, and "Saturday Night Live". In Europe, Carey performed "Vision of Love" on Wogan in the United Kingdom, and Sacrée Soirée and Le Monde Est A Vous in France. In 1992, Carey performed the song on MTV Unplugged. It was released on her EP and home video that same year, as MTV Unplugged and MTV Unplugged +3 respectively. In July 1993, Carey recorded a live concert performance at Proctor's Theatre which included "Vision of Love". It was taped and released as Here Is Mariah Carey in December 1993. Additionally, the song was part of a four-song set-list on BET's Blueprint, where Carey performed in July 2005.

"Vision of Love" was performed on several of Carey's tours and concert shows. It was first featured on her Music Box Tour, her first full-length stateside tour. For the song's performances, Carey donned a large black trench coat, with matching pants and leather boots. She featured her signature curly locks, and was joined by Trey Lorenz, Melonie Daniels and Kelly Price. On her 1996 Daydream World Tour, Carey once again included the song on the tour's set-list. During her shows at the Tokyo Dome in Tokyo, Japan, Carey donned a long black gown, with teased up straightened hair and a matching head-band. For the European leg on the tour, Carey wore a long white gown, and was joined by additional background vocalists. Carey included the song on her set-list for her Butterfly World Tour (1998), where she once again featured the same trio of supporting singers. For the show's performances, she donned a sheer and beige mini-dress, with long and wavy golden hair. Additionally, she wore a cream-colored long-sleeve sheer sweater with matching high-heeled sandals. "Vision of Love" was included on Carey's Rainbow World Tour in 2000, as well as the Charmbracelet World Tour: An Intimate Evening with Mariah Carey (2002–03), The Elusive Chanteuse Show (2014) and Caution World Tour (2019). During The Adventures of Mimi Tour in 2006, Carey performed the song at select shows. For the performances of the song, she donned a long yellow cocktail gown and black Christian Louboutin pumps. Once again Lorenz was featured on stage, however with the addition of two different female back-up singers, MaryAnn and Sherry Tatum. Carey also performed the song at the 2015 Billboard Music Awards along with Infinity to promote her number 1 To Infinity album. Carey also included the song in her Las Vegas residency, Mariah Carey Number 1's, a chronicle of her 18 US number 1 hits. The song was first in the chronological setlist, and for the performance Carey donned a black sequined gown, and her signature curls. Carey also included the song during the first two legs of her Las Vegas residency, The Butterfly Returns (2018).

== Legacy ==
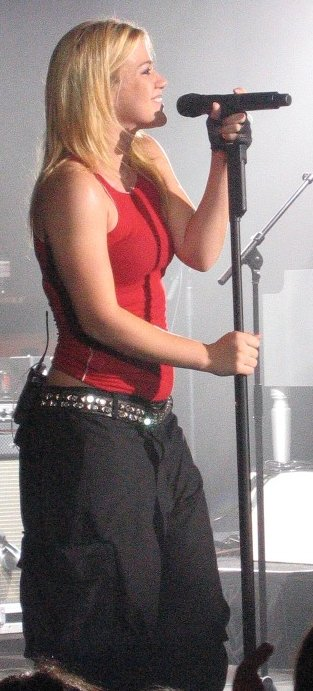
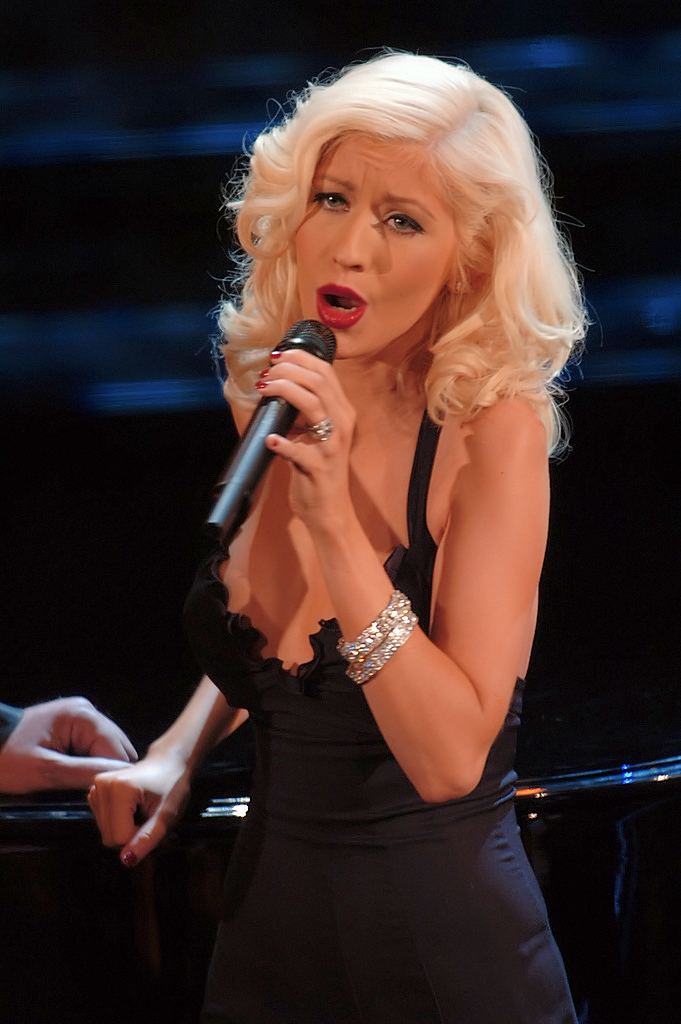
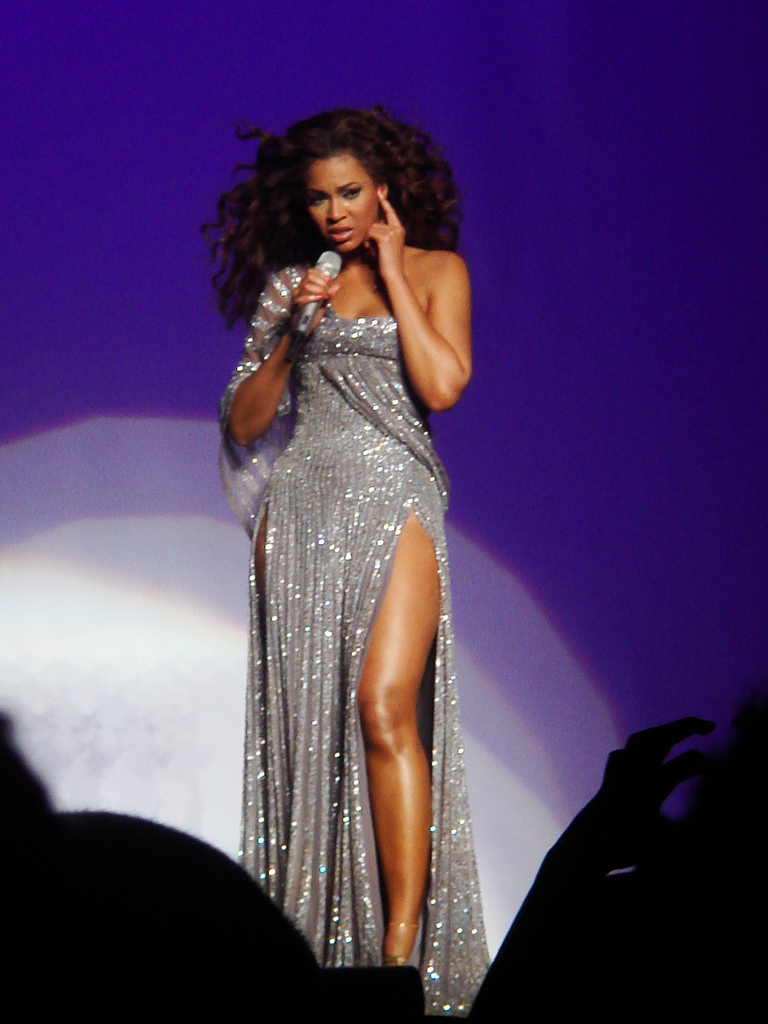
"Vision of Love" influenced many vocalists such as Kelly Clarkson (left), Christina Aguilera (middle) and Beyoncé (right).

"Vision of Love" was nominated for three Grammy Awards at the 33rd annual ceremony, held on February 20, 1991: Record of the Year, Song of the Year and Best Pop Vocal Performance, Female, winning the latter. Additionally, the song received the Soul Train Music Award for Best R&B/Soul Single, Female and a Song of the Year Award at the BMI Pop Awards. Devon Powers from Popmatters has stated during the release of Carey's Greatest Hits album that "Mariah's Greatest Hits moves chronologically through that remarkable career, beginning with "Vision of Love", the 1990 single that introduced the singer to instant stardom. Still, after so many years and songs, it's by far among her best, if not the best—a simple testament to the incredible pipes that gave her a permanent place in pop cultural memory." Powers added that "From its first moments, the song demands to be legendary—a gong crash smolders low as Mariah's gospel-inspired vocals hum confidently, grandly."

VH1 named "Vision of Love" the 14th greatest song of the 1990s. About.com ranked it fourth on its top ten pop hits of 1990 list and 28th on its top 100 pop songs of the 1990s list. Entertainment Weekly included it on their "10 Great (and 10 Grating) Karaoke Songs" list as a grating karaoke song, saying: "You cannot do this song. Seriously. Tackling this lung-crusher might seem like a fun challenge, but three minutes, five octaves, and one 10-second note later, you will realize that you did not conquer "Vision of Love." "Vision of Love" conquered you." USA Today critic Elysa Gardner picked "Vision of Love" as one of the most intriguing tracks, saying that it is still Mariah's best song. Stereogum writer Tom Breihan noted that the song, "pretty much set the stage for a whole decade of showy, pyrotechnic '90s R&B vocals. It also set the stage for the American Idol-style pageantry that followed more than a decade later. Carey created an environment where her disciples could flourish, and she did it by constructing "Vision Of Love" as a showcase for her voice".

R&B singer Beyoncé said that she began doing vocal "runs" after listening to "Vision of Love" for the first time. Similarly, pop singers Rihanna and Christina Aguilera cited the song and Carey as big influences on their singing careers. In an interview during the early stages of her career, Aguilera said "I've totally looked up to Mariah since 'Vision of Love' came out." Kelly Clarkson also cited "Vision of Love" as an influence on her singing career after performing the song on her first choir solo performance as a kid.

The song was featured in a late 1990 episode of the daytime soap opera All My Children as well as 1991 episodes of Santa Barbara and The Young and the Restless.

== Track listing and formats ==
- Worldwide cassette, 7-inch vinyl, CD and CD3 singles
1. "Vision of Love"
2. Special excerpts from the debut release "Prisoner / All in Your Mind / Someday"
- UK 12-inch vinyl and CD singles
1. "Vision of Love"
2. "Sent from Up Above"
3. Medley (featuring excerpts from "Prisoner / All in Your Mind / Someday")
- European 12-inch vinyl and maxi-CD singles
1. "Vision of Love"
2. "Prisoner / All in Your Mind / Someday"
3. "Sent from Up Above"
- Filipino 7-inch vinyl single
1. "Vision of Love"
2. "Someday"
- UK 7-inch vinyl and cassette singles
1. "Vision of Love"
2. "Sent from Up Above"
- Costa Rican 7-inch vinyl single
1. "Vision of Love"
2. "Love Takes Time"

== Credits and personnel ==
Credits adapted from the Mariah Carey liner notes.

- Songwriting – Mariah Carey, Ben Margulies
- Production – Rhett Lawrence, Narada Michael Walden
- Instruments and programming – Rhett Lawrence, Jimmy Ripp
- Recording – Rhett Lawrence
- Audio engineering – Narada Michael Walden
- All vocals – Mariah Carey
- Programming – Ben Margulies, Marcus Miller, Ren Klyce
- Mixing – Rhett Lawrence, Narada Michael Walden

== Charts ==
=== Weekly charts ===
Weekly chart performance
| Chart (1990) | Peak position |
|---|---|
| Australia (ARIA) | 9 |
| Belgium (Ultratop 50 Flanders) | 14 |
| Canada Retail Singles (The Record) | 1 |
| Canada Contemporary Hit Radio (The Record) | 1 |
| Canada Top Singles (RPM) | 1 |
| Canada Adult Contemporary (RPM) | 1 |
| Europe (European Hot 100 Singles) | 14 |
| Finland (Suomen virallinen lista) | 26 |
| France (SNEP) | 25 |
| Germany (GfK) | 17 |
| Iceland (Íslenski Listinn Topp 10) | 2 |
| Ireland (IRMA) | 10 |
| Israel (IBA) | 8 |
| Luxembourg (Radio Luxembourg) | 6 |
| Netherlands (Dutch Top 40) | 8 |
| Netherlands (Single Top 100) | 8 |
| New Zealand (Recorded Music NZ) | 1 |
| Spain Airplay (AFYVE) | 20 |
| Sweden (Sverigetopplistan) | 17 |
| Switzerland (Schweizer Hitparade) | 24 |
| UK Singles (Official Charts) | 9 |
| UK Singles (MRIB) | 8 |
| UK Dance Singles (Music Week) | 25 |
| US Hot 100 Singles (Billboard) | 1 |
| US Hot Adult Contemporary (Billboard) | 1 |
| US Hot Black Singles (Billboard) | 1 |
| US Crossover Radio Airplay – Top 40/Dance (Billboard) | 1 |
| US Cash Box Top 100 | 1 |
| US Top R&B Singles (Cash Box) | 1 |
| US Adult Contemporary (Gavin Report) | 1 |
| US Top 40 (Gavin Report) | 1 |
| US Urban Contemporary (Gavin Report) | 1 |
| US Adult Contemporary (Radio & Records) | 1 |
| US Contemporary Hit Radio (Radio & Records) | 1 |
| US Urban Contemporary (Radio & Records) | 1 |

=== Year-end charts ===
Year-end chart performance
| Chart (1990) | Position |
|---|---|
| Australia (ARIA) | 66 |
| Brazil (Brazilian Radio Airplay) | 1 |
| Canada Retail Singles (The Record) | 5 |
| Canada Top Singles (RPM) | 8 |
| Canada Adult Contemporary (RPM) | 4 |
| Europe Airplay (Music & Media) | 19 |
| Europe Adult Contemporary (Music & Media) | 7 |
| Netherlands (Dutch Top 40) | 52 |
| Netherlands (Single Top 100) | 72 |
| New Zealand (RIANZ) | 6 |
| Sweden (Topplistan) | 67 |
| US Billboard Hot 100 | 6 |
| US Adult Contemporary (Billboard) | 5 |
| US Hot R&B Singles (Billboard) | 5 |
| US B/C Singles (Cash Box) | 12 |
| US Pop Singles (Cash Box) | 16 |
| US Adult Contemporary (Radio & Records) | 5 |
| US Contemporary Hit Radio (Radio & Records) | 1 |
| US Urban (Radio & Records) | 15 |

=== Decade-end charts ===
Decade-end chart performance
| Chart (1990–1999) | Position |
|---|---|
| Canada (Nielsen SoundScan) | 74 |
| US Billboard Hot 100 | 91 |

== Certifications and sales ==
Certifications and sales
| Region | Certification | Certified units/sales |
|---|---|---|
| Australia (ARIA) | Gold | 35,000^{^} |
| New Zealand (RMNZ) | Gold | 5,000^{*} |
| United Kingdom | — | 198,000 |
| United States (RIAA) | Platinum | 1,000,000^{‡} |
^{*} Sales figures based on certification alone.^{^} Shipments figures based on certification alone.^{‡} Sales+streaming figures based on certification alone.

== Release history ==
Release dates and formats
| Region | Date | Format(s) | Label(s) | Ref. |
|---|---|---|---|---|
| United States | May 15, 1990 | 7-inch vinyl; cassette | Columbia | |
| Australia | July 2, 1990 | 7-inch vinyl; cassette | CBS | |
| United Kingdom | July 23, 1990 | 7-inch vinyl; 12-inch vinyl; maxi CD | CBS | |
| France | July 29, 1990 | 7-inch vinyl | CBS | |
| Japan | August 22, 1990 | Mini CD | Sony Music Japan | |
| Australia | September 24, 1990 | Maxi CD | CBS | |

== See also ==
- List of Billboard Hot 100 number-one singles of 1990
- List of number-one R&B singles of 1990 (U.S.)
- List of number-one adult contemporary singles of 1990 (U.S.)
- List of number-one singles of 1990 (Canada)
- List of number-one singles in 1990 (New Zealand)

== Bibliography ==
- Bronson, Fred (2003). The Billboard Book of Number 1 Hits. Billboard Books. ISBN 0-8230-7677-6.
- Nickson, Chris (1998). Mariah Carey revisited: her story. St. Martin's Press. ISBN 978-0-312-19512-0.
