= Media Research Information Bureau =

Defunct UK music chart research company

The Media Research Information Bureau (MRIB) was a music chart research company that operated in the United Kingdom from 1981 to 2008. It was best known for compiling the chart data for The Network Chart Show which was broadcast by many TV and radio shows, as well as being published in many music newspapers and magazines. MRIB also compiled other genre charts for the United Kingdom.

== History ==
=== Foundation ===
MRIB was founded in 1981, by Luke Crampton, and Dafydd Rees. In December 1984, data from MRIB showed that pirate radio station Laser 558 had an audience of nearly five million people.

=== The Network Chart ===
MRIB's Network Chart was a rival competitor to the "official" UK chart that was compiled by Gallup and that is now published by the Official Charts Company (OCC). MRIB's Network Chart was broadcast by more than 40 commercial and Independent Local Radio stations. It was reported in March 1991 that the Network Chart compiled by MRIB had a radio audience size that was gaining on the BBC Radio 1 chart show which broadcast the chart that was compiled by Gallup for the OCC (then CIN). Later that month Music & Media magazine reported that they were switching to publishing the MRIB charts for the UK which they would also use to compile the European Hot 100 Singles and European Top 100 Albums charts. There were sometimes public disputes over accuracy between Gallup and MRIB such as when the former placed Whitney Houston's single "I Wanna Dance with Somebody (Who Loves Me)" at number 10 while the latter placed it at number 2 in the same week. MRIB's Network Chart was published in music publications NME, Melody Maker, and Sounds, as well as on ITV's Teletext service. MRIB's Network Chart used sales data starting from different days of the week from those Gallup used for its Radio 1 chart. However, in July 1993 it was announced that the Top 10 of the Network Chart would use the same sales data as Gallup's chart for CIN and Radio 1, when Pepsi took over sponsorship from Nescafé, but that the lower 11-40 positions would still combine sales with radio airplay data. This new Network Chart was compiled by Spotlight Publications who beat MRIB to the contract. Although MRIB's chart was no longer broadcast on commercial and independent radio, it was still used in publications such as NME and Melody Maker. Although no longer used as the Network Chart, the UK MRIB chart was still published internationally in Jamaica's Kingston Gleaner.

=== Other charts ===
MRIB also compiled the UK Independent Singles and Albums Charts that were published in many newspapers and magazines such as Melody Maker. Alongside the Network Chart, they also compiled regional charts for ILR stations such as the London chart used on Alan Freeman's Pick of the Pops Take Two on Capital Radio and the North East England chart used on Metro Radio and published in the Newcastle Evening Chronicle. In the 1980s MRIB compiled the disco charts for the UK that were published in Record Business (which was later absorbed into Music Week and published as the Disco and Dance chart). From 1982 through the 1990s the UK rock charts that were published in Kerrang! magazine were also compiled by MRIB. In the early 90s, MRIB compiled BSkyb's UK Top 40 chart which was shown on Sky One. MRIB also provided the film box office charts that were published in NME in the 90s. Although MRIB's Network Chart was a direct rival to the chart that was compiled by Gallup for CIN/OCC and broadcast by BBC Radio 1, the same radio station announced in 1995 that it was launching the 1FM Artist Chart that combined album and singles sales and would be compiled by MRIB. This had apparently disappointed CIN, and the British Phonographic Industry as reported by Music Week on 14 January 1995. However, it was later reported on 29 April 1995 that CIN would be taking over compiling the chart from MRIB. From 1998 to 2001, MRIB also compiled the World Beat album chart show for CNN International. In 2002, Emap announced that they would be launching their own Smash Hits chart for its FM radio stations such as Kiss and that it would be compiled using sales data from MRIB.

=== Demise ===
MRIB closed in 2008, but the Network Chart was taken over by other companies and re-branded a number of times, until it was relaunched in January, 2019 as The Official Big Top 40, again as a rival to BBC Radio 1's The Official Chart that is compiled by OCC.
