= The First Vision =

1991 video album by Mariah Carey

- VHS cover

Video by Mariah Carey
- Released: January 22, 1991
- Length: 42:00
- Label: Sony Music Video

Mariah Carey chronology
The First Vision (1991)	MTV Unplugged +3 (1992)

The First Vision is the debut video album by American singer Mariah Carey, released by Sony Music Video on January 22, 1991. It is a collection of music videos, live performances, and film footage detailing the development and promotion of Carey's first studio album Mariah Carey (1990). Music videos of three Mariah Carey singles – "Vision of Love", "Love Takes Time", and "Someday" – are featured, as are snippets of the future singles "I Don't Wanna Cry" and "There's Got to Be a Way". The collection presents Carey performing at New York City's Club Tatou and behind-the-scenes footage of her rehearsing for appearances on Saturday Night Live and It's Showtime at the Apollo. During an interview segment, Carey answers questions about her life and music.

Critics focused on Carey's depiction in The First Vision. Some considered it insightful, while others opined that it sexually projected her. They praised Carey's live performances as an effective vocal showcase. The video peaked at numbers 2 and 24 on US and UK music video charts published by Billboard and the Official Charts Company, respectively. The Canadian Recording Industry Association certified it gold for shipments of 5,000 copies, and the Recording Industry Association of America certified it platinum for 100,000 units in the United States.

== Background and release ==
Columbia Records released Mariah Carey's first studio album, Mariah Carey, on June 12, 1990. To support the record, Carey performed live at New York City's Club Tatou, Studio 8H, and Apollo Theater. Her first three singles – "Vision of Love", "Love Takes Time", and "Someday" – reached number one on the US Billboard Hot 100 chart. Columbia commissioned music videos for the three songs, and all were released commercially as part of The First Vision.

Sony Music Video issued The First Vision on VHS in the United States on January 22, 1991, and in the United Kingdom on March 4. A LaserDisc edition followed on August 25, 1992, and a DVD was eventually released in Japan on November 17, 2004. Sony Pictures Entertainment made it available for digital download and rental in the United States on December 7, 2021. Club Tatou performances of "Don't Play That Song" and "Vanishing" are included on disc two of a 1991 Australian edition of Mariah Carey, and all were released for digital download and streaming as part of the 2020 extended play The Live Debut – 1990.

== Summary ==
The First Vision contains Carey's first three music videos, live performances, film footage, and her responses to interview questions. It opens with the "Vision of Love" music video. Carey explains that she began singing as a young girl and credits her mother as a musical inspiration. She describes how gospel music significantly influences her and is expressed in the lyrics and musical arrangements of her songs. In a live performance at Club Tatou on October 22, 1990, Carey performs "Vanishing", a track from Mariah Carey that was not released as a single. She is accompanied by a piano player and three background singers, Patrique, Billy, and Trey Lorenz. They rehearse for Carey's appearance on It's Showtime at the Apollo by singing "Who's Loving You". Carey states that she always dreamed of singing at the Apollo Theater because some of her idols, such as Aretha Franklin, had performed there. She reflects on working odd jobs before getting a record deal and recounts how "Love Takes Time" came to be included on her album. The music video is shown, after which Carey details her filming experience.

Carey prepares for her October 27, 1990, Saturday Night Live performance with her background singers and describes their close friendship. They rehearse by singing "All in Your Mind", another Mariah Carey track, on stage. Additional rehearsal footage is shown as the studio version of the song plays in the background. Back at Club Tatou, Carey covers Franklin's "Don't Play That Song". She answers further questions about how success makes her feel and says she looks forward to completing the writing process for her second album, Emotions (1991). Footage of Carey performing "I Don't Wanna Cry" is then shown. As The First Vision preceded the filming of that song's music video, an alternative preview is provided with Carey singing amid red-orange lights on an empty stage. She describes the lyrical inspiration for "Someday" and collaborating with its video director. After the clip is shown, Carey expresses gratitude for the opportunity to share her music with the world. "There's Got to Be a Way" plays in the background as the credits roll. In subsequent non-VHS releases, her performances of "Love Takes Time" and "Vision of Love" at Club Tatou are provided.

== Critical reception ==
Professional ratings
Review scores
Source	Rating
AllMusic	2/5 stars
Chicago Sun-Times	3/4 stars
Los Angeles Times	2.5/5 stars
Select	3/5 medals
Yorkshire Evening Press	4/4

The video's overall effectiveness received reviews. According to AllMusic writer Ashley S. Battel, The First Vision was a compelling prelude to Carey's stardom. Forrest Spencer of AllMovie believed it provided insights into her early career that fans would appreciate. Martin Aston called it "as good a compilation as you could hope for" in Music Week.

Critics commented on the video's depiction of Carey. Los Angeles Times critic Dennis Hunt found the interview segment the weakest portion because Carey "offers no in-depth answers to basic questions". Writing for Select, Chris Marlowe said she was "carefully scripted to convey a sense of charming casualness". Rolling Stone contributor Jim Farber likened the video to an advertisement for a phone sex line owing to Carey's "saucerlike eyes, serpentine hair, and maul-me expressions". Hunt remarked the camera's focus on her resembled production choices typically seen in a Playboy video.

Carey's live recordings received positive reviews. In his biography of Carey, author Chris Nickson considered them the best part of the video. Hunt felt they provided Carey ample opportunity to showcase her vocal abilities. According to Marlowe, "her voice can make up for nearly anything". Jornal do Brasil writer Marcus Veras considered the rehearsals a highlight. People's Ralph Novak complimented the cover of "Don't Play That Song" as he felt its lyrics allowed Carey's voice to come across more powerfully than in her self-written material. Lynn Voedisch of the Chicago Sun-Times said she exuded emotion when singing it. Reviewing in 2020, NME writer Eddy Lim described Carey's rendition of "Vision of Love" as extraordinary and Jon Caramanica of The New York Times thought they all showcased "her voice in its full, pure, almost unfathomable luster".

== Commercial performance ==
The First Vision debuted at number six on the US Billboard Top Music Videos chart in the March 2, 1991, issue. It peaked at number two a month later and remained on the chart for the next 44 weeks. According to Billboard, it was the fifth best-performing music video of 1991 in the United States. The Recording Industry Association of America certified it platinum for shipments of 100,000 copies and the Canadian Recording Industry Association (CRIA) certified it gold for 5,000 units. When the CRIA retired video certifications in 2021, it remained Carey's only certified video in that country.

In the United Kingdom, the video reached number 29 on the Chart Information Network (CIN) music video chart dated March 23, 1991. Three years later amid Carey's simultaneous number ones on the albums (Music Box), singles ("Without You"), and music video charts (Here Is Mariah Carey), The First Vision entered at number 37 on the Official Charts Company's music videos chart dated April 2, 1994. It peaked at number 24 for the week ending June 11, 1994, and appeared on the chart as late as July 1995.

== Track listing ==
All tracks are written by Mariah Carey and Ben Margulies, except where noted. Although track listings vary between releases, the only video difference is the addition of "Love Takes Time" (live) and "Vision of Love" (live) in non-VHS editions.

VHS edition 1 (42 minutes)

- 1. "Vision of Love"
- 2. "Vanishing" (live)
- 3. "Love Takes Time"
- 4. "Don't Play That Song" (live; Ahmet Ertegün, Betty Nelson)
- 5. "I Don't Wanna Cry" (Mariah Carey, Narada Michael Walden)
- 6. "Someday" (extended version)

VHS edition 2 (42 minutes)

- 3. "Who's Loving You" (a capella; Smokey Robinson)
- 4. "Love Takes Time"
- 5. "All in Your Mind" (a capella)
- 6. "Don't Play That Song" (live; Ertegün, Nelson)
- 7. "I Don't Wanna Cry" (Carey, Walden)
- 8. "Someday" (extended version)
- 9. "There's Got to Be a Way" (Carey, Ric Wake)

LaserDisc edition (49 minutes)

- 4. "All in Your Mind" (a capella)
- 5. "Don't Play That Song" (live; Ertegün, Nelson)
- 6. "I Don't Wanna Cry" (Carey, Walden)
- 7. "Someday" (extended version)
- 8. "Love Takes Time" (live)
- 9. "Vision of Love" (live)

DVD edition (49 minutes)

- 7. "Love Takes Time" (live)
- 8. "Vision of Love" (live)

== Credits ==
Personnel adapted from the closing credits.

The First Vision

- Jeb Brien – producer, director, segment director
- Judy Minot – editor

=== Music videos ===
"Love Takes Time"

- Bojan Bazelli – director of photography
- Sean Fullan – editor
- Ron Kay – producer
- Wayne Maser – co-director

"Someday"

- Lexi Godfrey – producer
- Larry Jordan – director
- Judy Minot – editor
- Daniel Pearl – director of photography

"Vision of Love"

- Bojan Bazelli – director of photography
- Ron Kay – producer
- Tom Muldoon – editor

=== Additional footage ===
Club Tatou performances

- Jeb Brien – producer
- David Greenwald – editor
- Jim Gucciardo – producer
- Ed Stephenson – director of photography

"I Don't Wanna Cry"

- Michael B. Borofsky – producer

Interview segment

- David Hewitt – on-site recording
- Kevin Moy – assistant editor
- RVI/Rutt Videos Inc. – post-production
- Tim Smith – camera, lighting
- Sync Sound – audio post-production
- Deb Turco – assistant editor

Saturday Night Live and Apollo segments

- Goochinetti Productions – producer
- Ed Stephenson – camera

== Charts and certifications ==
1991 chart performance
Chart (Publisher)	Weekly peak position	Year-end position
UK Music Videos (CIN)	29	—
US Music Videos (Video Insider)	1	—
US Top Music Videos (Billboard)	2	5 (Note: According to Billboard, the "Final year-end chart positioning is based on a point system. Points are given to each title for each week on the chart. The Year-End Charts Positions reflect the accumulation of all points – based on the number of weeks on the chart, plus positions attained – that each title has received." It is based on Billboard issues from November 24, 1990, to November 23, 1991.)
US Top Video Sales (Billboard)	20	69

1994 chart performance
Chart (Publisher)	Weekly peak position
UK Music Videos (OCC)	24

List of certifications
Country (Organization)	Units (Certification)
Canada (CRIA)	5,000 (Gold)
United States (RIAA)	100,000 (Platinum) (Note: As of March 26, 1991)
