= Make It Happen (Mariah Carey song) =

1992 single by Mariah Carey

- Single cover (Note: The 5 mixes version & 12" single uses the image above, featuring Mariah Carey in warm backlight, with a red logo at the top right.)

Single by Mariah Carey

from the album Emotions
- B-side: "Emotions" (Special Motion Edit)
- Released: February 1992
- Recorded: 1991
- Studio: Skyline Studios (New York City); Electric Lady Studios (New York City); Axis Studios (New York City)
- Genre: House; dance; R&B; gospel
- Length: 5:08 (album version); 4:05 (edit)
- Label: Columbia
- Composers: Mariah Carey; David Cole; Robert Clivillés
- Lyricist: Mariah Carey
- Producers: Mariah Carey; Robert Clivillés; David Cole

Mariah Carey singles chronology
"Can't Let Go" (1991)	"Make It Happen" (1992)	"I'll Be There" (1992)

Music video
- "Make It Happen" on YouTube

"Make It Happen" is a song by American singer-songwriter Mariah Carey. Written and produced by Carey and C+C Music Factory's David Cole and Robert Clivillés, it was released in February 1992, by Columbia Records as the third and final single from her second studio album, Emotions (1991). The pop-, R&B-, and dance-influenced track incorporates traces of gospel in its bridge and crescendo. It tells of her personal struggles prior to her rise to fame, and how her faith in God helped sustain her.

The song was praised by music critics, many of whom applauded Carey's incorporation of several musical genres, as well as the song's personalized lyrical content. Aside from its critical acceptance, "Make It Happen" was successful in the United States, but charted weakly internationally compared to her previous singles. It peaked at number five on the Billboard Hot 100 and finished at number 42 on Billboard's Year-End Chart. The song reached number seven in Canada and the top 40 in the United Kingdom and Australia, but did not reach the top 50 in the Netherlands and Germany.

The song's music video, directed by Marcus Nispel, was filmed in a cathedral-like church. A benefit event inside, titled "Save Our Church", features Carey as the main performer, leading a choir in song as she sings to the constant cheering and applause of the crowd. Aside from the video's message of prayer and religion, the video features men and women of different backgrounds. Carey included the song on the set lists of all of her concert tours throughout her career, and the track was included on her compilation albums Greatest Hits (2001), Playlist: The Very Best of Mariah Carey (2010), and The Essential Mariah Carey (2012).

On July 31, 2020, along with the celebration of the 30th-anniversary of her debut studio album Mariah Carey, as well as Carey celebrating 30 years in the music industry, she released the song as a six-track extended play, titled Make It Happen EP, which contains some remixes from the U.S. CD maxi-single, as well as live renditions, including her performances at Fantasy: Mariah Carey at Madison Square Garden in 1995 and VH1 Divas Live in 1998.

== Background ==
As a child, Carey lived with her mother Patricia in a small apartment on Long Island, New York. They were poor and had to move several times as Patricia found different jobs. As a result, Carey frequently transferred into different schools, and at the age of seventeen, she moved into a small Manhattan studio with other young women to pursue a career in music. She had already begun working on her demo tape with Ben Margulies, a classmate at her school in Huntington, Long Island. During this period, she lived a lifestyle of poverty, often sharing a box of spaghetti with her five roommates and wearing torn shoes. She held several jobs, while juggling school, writing, and recording music.

After graduating from high school, Carey invested more time into her music while working sporadically at different jobs. She began working for Puerto Rican singer Brenda K. Starr as a background singer, hoping to find new opportunities and meet important record executives along the way. At a gala for Sony executives, Starr gave a copy of Carey's demo tape to Tommy Mottola, CEO of Columbia Records. Mottola was sufficiently impressed with the tape to sign Carey to the label. Two years later in 1991, Carey was well under way writing and recording material for her second studio album, Emotions (1991). During the months spent conceptualizing the album, Carey decided to write a song that would illustrate her lifestyle prior to her success. She felt listeners' hearing her rags-to-riches story might inspire them to pursue their dreams. As a result, Carey wrote what was described by author Chris Nickson as her "most inspirational song" (up until "Hero"), titled "Make It Happen".

== Composition ==
"Make It Happen"
A 30-second sample of "Make It Happen", featuring vocal growling, a gospel arrangement and churchy overtones. Critics compared the song's climax to a prayer and complimented its "jazzy feel".

Following the success of her self-titled debut album, Carey desired to pen her personal struggles prior to her signing with Columbia. She hoped to give her fans an idea of what her life was like two years prior and to instill relief or inspiration in them. In the song, Carey sings "Not more than three short years ago / I was abandoned and alone / Without a penny to my name / So very young and so afraid / No proper shoes upon my feet / Sometimes I couldn't even eat / I often cried myself to sleep." Later in the song, Carey sings "But still I had to keep on going / I struggled and I prayed / And finally found my way," retelling how her faith helped guide her until her career blossomed and expressing to listeners the importance of finding and connecting with God. Author Chris wrote the following regarding the song, its lyrics and composition:

That wasn't just a faith in herself and her talent, but also the ability to let herself go, to pray to God, and to trust in what would happen. These were, by far, her most inspiring words to date, letting others know that no matter what they were doing, no matter how difficult things were, with help they would win through. Musically, the piece had a restrained dance beat, very Mowtownish, that owed a little more to gospel, with a chorus – sung by Mariah, Trey and Patrique – that rose gloriously from the verse to repeat and drive and its very positive message home.

"Make It Happen" is a dance track that draws influence from pop, R&B, gospel, and dance-pop genres; its tempo is 108 beats per minute. The song was written and produced by Carey and C+C Music Factory's David Cole and Robert Clivillés, and it was released as the third and final single from her second studio album, Emotions. It employs several musical instruments, including the piano, guitar, bass, organ, and tambourine. Additionally, Carey incorporated a church choir into the track's bridge, which, according to Nickson, helped the song become even more of an anthem. The song is set in common time and is composed in the key of D minor. Carey's vocal range spans from the low-note of C_{3} to the high-note of G_{5}, while the song's chorus follows a chord progression of G_{sus2}–G–G/F♯–Em_{7}–G/D–C–G/B–Am_{7}.

== Reception ==
=== Critical response ===
"Make It Happen" has received acclaim from music critics, many of whom complimented its uplifting lyrical content. AllMusic critic Stephen Thomas Erlewine named the song one of his top two picks from Emotions, while Jon Pareles from The New York Times called it an "uplifting pop-gospel homily". Steve Morse of The Boston Globe wrote: "[Its] positive message also soars through a gospel rearrangement. After hearing it, we understand why [Carey named] gospel star Shirley Caesar ... such a strong influence". In a different review of the album, Morse called "Make It Happen" "glorious" and described it as "a clear slice of spiritual autobiography". Larry Flick from Billboard magazine stated that here, Carey "tones down the vocal acrobatics slightly and delivers her most appealing and affecting single to date." He added, "Infectious pop/house musical context is slick enough to keep radio fires burning, but tough enough to further develop her club profile. Spiritually uplifting lyrics are a bonus." Cashbox commented, "The overall sound of the single is quite different from her previous fast-paced cuts and should pick up with little or no promotion." Gavin Report said it is "a brightly lit pop n' soul single with hit written all over it."

Pan-European magazine Music & Media noted, "Dryly thumping beats, trebly rhythm guitar and dabs of synthesized violins make for a song with Chic-like feel. With its '70s dance influenced production aiming for the feet instead of the emotions, Carey stands a fair chance of having an uptempo dance/EHR hit on her hands." In a review for Carey's Greatest Hits in December 2001, Devon Powers from PopMatters called the song's lyrics "power through prayer" and described some of its vocals as having "churchy overtones". Rob Tannenbaum from Rolling Stone described the track as "a teary tale of how she kept her religious faith despite hard times", while complimenting its "overheated [vocal] growling." Chicago Tribune editor Jan DeKnock called it "upbeat" and "inspirational", while Mellisa A. Jacque from the St. Petersburg Times wrote "Carey evokes a deep-felt strength and love for life, and the music has a jazzy feel in its sparsity". Chicago Sun-Times critic Michael Corcoran called it a "so-so composition" and described it as a "zombie dance-pop" production, though he said the song was salvaged by Carey's "stunning vocals". In 2025, Billboard magazine ranked "Make It Happen" number 83 in their list of "The 100 Greatest LGBTQ+ Anthems of All Time".

=== Copyright lawsuit ===
Carey, Cole, Clivillés and Sony Music Entertainment were sued in June 1994 by songwriter Kevin McCord, who accused the party of incorporating significant musical elements from his 1979 song, "I Want to Thank You", into "Make It Happen", the former which went onto become a hit song for singer Alicia Myers in 1981. McCord said, "If you listen to the chords at the beginning of the song, the similarity is obvious. It's the exact same chords in a different key"; he also noted lyrical similarities. Carey's side initially claimed McCord had no standing to sue, but McCord's attorney showed the song's copyright owners had transferred their legal interest in "I Want to Thank You" to McCord "in an effort to adjudicate their claims". Though a Carey spokesperson maintained the copyright infringement allegations were false, McCord said he had turned down settlement offers from Carey's camp. McCord eventually accepted a settlement offer of about US$500,000.

== Chart performance ==
Carey's debut album sold over 15 million copies globally and produced four chart-topping singles on the US Billboard Hot 100. Although "Emotions" became Carey's fifth chart-topping single in the US, sales for the album, Emotions, stalled. As sales of Emotions continued to plummet, Columbia released "Make It Happen" as the third worldwide single from the album. Following a strong promotional boost for the song, it only peaked at number five on the Hot 100, becoming Carey's lowest charting US single to that point. It remained in the top 40 for 16 weeks and was ranked at number 42 on Billboard's 1992 Year-End Chart. On the February 22, 1992, issue of RPM, "Make It Happen" debuted at number 97 on the Canadian singles chart. On May 16, the song reached its peak position of number seven, staying in the singles chart for 19 weeks.

The song's charting throughout Australia and Europe was weak in comparison to Carey's previous singles (the single was not released in New Zealand, despite Carey's popularity in that country at the time). On the May 10, 1992, Australian Singles Chart, "Make It Happen" debuted at number 45. The following week, it rose to its peak of number 35, and spent five weeks within the chart. Similarly, in the Netherlands, the song attained a peak of 59 and spent only five weeks in the Dutch Top 100. The song entered the UK Singles Chart at number 20 on the week ending April 18, 1992. The following week, the song rose three spots to its peak position and charted for five weeks. "Make It Happen" was awarded a BMI Pop Award in 1992.

== Music video ==
Still of the music video. Chris Nickson noted many races are represented and all are working towards the common goal of saving the church.

The music video for "Make It Happen" was directed by German director Marcus Nispel and features Carey performing at a closing church. Alisa Reyes, best known from Nickelodeon's All That appears on stage with Mariah. A benefit being depicted within, titled "Save Our Church", involves several other churchgoers who have congregated there to raise money through song. As the video begins, inspectors enter the building, searching the premises prior to its closing. Soon after, however, Carey makes her way to the stage with a few background singers and is soon joined inside the edifice by swarming groups of religious individuals. As she begins playing the song, an additional choir forms on the small stage with several small children on the upper tiers. Several musicians enter the room as the video progresses.

Towards the video's climax, the crowd cheers Carey and begin clapping and chanting praises. Nispel said he added additional raw sounds, such as cheers, praises, and shouts, into the video in order make it feel like a "real, live experience". In his biography of Carey, Nickson noted the inclusion of men, women, and children of different races and ages: "The video tried to incorporate and further the song's image of religious belief and racial equality. The audience, as they filled into the dusty and deserted building, was made up of the widest cross section possible: old and young (with a strong emphasis on the children), abled and disabled, all races and color."

== Live performances ==
Carey has performed "Make It Happen" on live television, during charity appearances, and on numerous concert tours. Her first live performance of the song was an acoustic version on the television show MTV Unplugged in 1992, which was later released on the EP entitled MTV Unplugged (1992). Carey's performance was recorded on March 16, 1992, at Kaufman Astoria Studios in Queens, New York. The show featured several musicians, back-up vocalists, and a crew of ten just for the filming and recording. The show was directed by Larry Jordan, who had previously worked with Carey on the music video set for "Someday". Nickson felt the song was superior to the studio version, due to its stripped performance and vocals:

The roughness of this version succeeded in a way the recorded version on 'Emotions' could never manage. In the sterile atmosphere of a studio, where perfection, technology, and overdubbing were the rules, spontaneity had no place. On the stage, it was valued, and this performance had it. Everyone pushed everyone just a little further, to create something wonderful, and judging by the response, the audience realized it, as did Mariah when the song was finished. It was a rare moment, one that true performers strive for and don't find often enough to satisfy themselves.

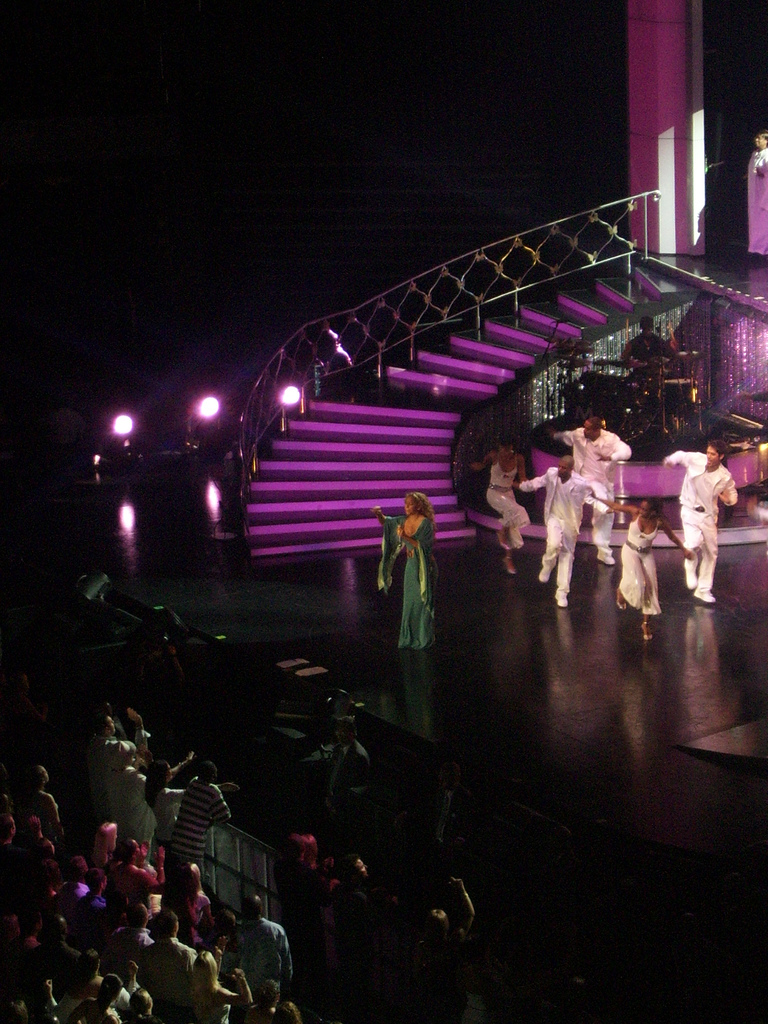
Carey performing "Make It Happen" in Florida, during her Adventures of Mimi Tour

Carey performed "Make It Happen" at an intimate concert at Proctor Theatre in New York on July 15, 1993. The concert was released as the home video Here Is Mariah Carey (1993). At the VH1 Divas taping in 1998, Carey was the opening performer of the event, and after "My All", her single at the time, she followed with "Make It Happen". As during the usual live performances of the song, a gospel choir accompanied her. On July 2, 2005, a benefit concert was held in Hyde Park, London, titled Live 8. The televised event was watched by over 9.6 million Britons and attended by over 200,000. Carey performed a three-song set list, opening with "Make It Happen" followed by "Hero" and "We Belong Together", featuring a live choir of African children during the first two songs. On April 12, 2005, Carey performed the song as part of a three-song concert for Good Morning America, drawing the biggest crowd in Times Square since December 2004. Following a live rendition of "It's Like That" with Jermaine Dupri, Carey was joined on stage by several male and female vocalists, all wearing white gowns and serving as a gospel choir. Similarly, on October 2, 2009, Carey played a four-song set list at Rockefeller Center for a taping of The Today Show. "Make It Happen" was performed with a church choir and children's quartet.

Aside from the televised appearances and charity events, "Make It Happen" was featured on the set lists of several of Carey's world tours. The song was routinely performed on the Music Box Tour and the Daydream World Tour in 1993 and early-mid 1996, respectively. During her first show at Japan's Tokyo Dome on March 7, 1996, Carey performed the song alongside a twenty-five person choir and several additional musicians and background vocalists. "Make It Happen" was featured on Carey's Butterfly World Tour in early 1998, during which she was joined on stage by several choir members and musicians. Similarly, two years later, the song was placed as the ninth song on the set list during select dates of her Rainbow World Tour. Similar set-ups were featured for her following Charmbracelet World Tour and The Adventures of Mimi Tour, where church choirs were brought out for the song, in addition to additional background vocalists and musicians. In the Angels Advocate Tour, the song served as a dancer's interlude; Carey entered during the bridge of the song. On September 26, 2010, during the song's performance in a show in Singapore for that tour, Carey slipped on stage, and the small slip was blamed on Carey's US$10,000 heels. She asked her assistant to remove them and completed the concert barefoot. Carey started performing the single for the first time since November 2014 on her second concert residency placed in Las Vegas, The Butterfly Returns (2018).

== Track listings ==
- US CD maxi-single
1. "Make It Happen" (Extended Version) – 6:15
2. "Make It Happen" (Dub Version) – 7:27
3. "Make It Happen" (C+C Classic Version) – 5:22
4. "Make It Happen" (Radio Edit) – 4:52
5. "Make It Happen" (LP Version) – 5:07
6. "Emotions" (Special Motion Edit) – 4:45
- US 12" single, UK 12" single and UK cassette single
1. "Make It Happen" (Extended Version) – 6:15
2. "Make It Happen" (Dub Version) – 7:27
3. "Make It Happen" (C+C Classic Version) – 5:22
4. "Make It Happen" (LP Version) – 5:07
- US 7" single and * * UK 7" single
1. "Make It Happen" (Edit) – 4:05
2. "Emotions" (Special Motion Edit) – 4:45
- UK CD maxi-single
1. "Make It Happen" (Radio Edit) – 4:08
2. "Make It Happen" (Extended Version) – 6:15
3. "Make It Happen" (Dub Version) – 7:27
4. "Make It Happen" (C+C Classic Version) – 5:22
5. "Make It Happen" (LP Version) – 5:07
- Make It Happen EP
1. "Make It Happen" (Radio Edit) – 4:08
2. "Make It Happen" (C&C Classic Version) – 5:22
3. "Make It Happen" (Extended Version) – 6:15
4. "Make It Happen" (Dub Version) – 7:27
5. "Make It Happen" (Live at Madison Square Garden) – 4:45
6. "Make It Happen" (VH1 Divas Live) – 5:22

== Credits and personnel ==
Recording

- Recorded at Skyline Studios, Electric Lady Studios and Axis Studios, NYC.
- Mixed at Axis Studios, NYC.

Personnel

- Lyrics – Mariah Carey
- Music – Mariah Carey, David Cole, Robert Clivillés
- Production – Mariah Carey, David Cole, Robert Clivillés
- Programming – Alan Friedman (for YIPE!)
- Mixing – Bob Rosa
- Engineers – Acar S. Key, John Mathias
- Keyboards – David Cole
- Guitar – Paul Pesco
- Drum programming – David Cole, Robert Clivillés
- Vocal arrangement – Mariah Carey, David Cole
- Background vocals – Mariah Carey, Trey Lorenz, Patrique McMillan

Credits adapted from the liner notes of Emotions.

== Charts ==
Weekly chart performance
Chart (1992)	Peak position
Australia (ARIA)	35
Canada Top Singles (RPM)	7
Canada Retail Singles (The Record)	16
Canada Contemporary Hit Radio (The Record)	1
Europe (Eurochart Hot 100)	44
Europe (European Dance Radio)	8
Europe (European Hit Radio)	22
Germany (GfK)	74
Israel (IBA)	10
Netherlands (Dutch Top 40 Tipparade)	7
Netherlands (Single Top 100)	59
UK Singles (Official Charts)	17
UK Singles (MRIB)	12
UK Club Chart (Music Week) Mixes	14
UK Dance (Music Week)	13
UK Airplay (ERA)	24
UK Airplay (Music & Media)	20
US Hot 100 Singles (Billboard)	5
US Hot Adult Contemporary (Billboard)	13
US Hot Dance Music Club Play (Billboard)	16
US Hot Dance Music 12-inch Singles Sales (Billboard)	22
US Hot R&B Singles (Billboard)	7
US Cash Box Top 100	3
US Top 100 R&B Singles (Cash Box)	4
US Top 30 Dance Singles (Cash Box)	12
US Adult Contemporary (Gavin Report)	11
US Top 40 (Gavin Report)	1
US Top 40/Urban Crossover (Gavin Report)	1
US Urban Contemporary (Gavin Report)	1
US Adult Contemporary (Radio & Records)	14
US Contemporary Hit Radio (Radio & Records)	1
US Urban Contemporary (Radio & Records)	4

Year-end chart performance
Chart (1992)	Position
Canada Top Singles (RPM)	43
Canada Retail Singles (The Record)	94
US Billboard Hot 100	42
US Hot R&B Singles (Billboard)	80
US Cash Box Top 100	32
US Adult Contemporary (Gavin Report)	75
US Top 40 (Gavin Report)	14
US Urban Contemporary (Gavin Report)	38
US Adult Contemporary (Radio & Records)	71
US Contemporary Hit Radio (Radio & Records)	13
US Urban (Radio & Records)	57

== Release history ==
Release dates and formats for "Emotions"
Region	Date	Format(s)	Label(s)	Ref.
United States	February 1992	7-inch vinyl; cassette	Columbia	
Japan	March 19, 1992	Mini CD	Sony Music Japan	
United States	April 1992	12-inch vinyl; CD; maxi cassette	Columbia	
United Kingdom	April 6, 1992	7-inch vinyl; 12-inch vinyl; cassette; CD	Columbia	
United States	June 1992	Maxi CD	Columbia	
