= Here Is Mariah Carey =

Video by Mariah Carey
- Released: November 30, 1993
- Recorded: July 14–16, 1993 (performances)
- Venues: Proctor's Theatre, Schenectady, New York, U.S.
- Length: ~60:00
- Label: Columbia Music Video
- Director: Lawrence Jordan

Mariah Carey chronology
MTV Unplugged +3 (1992)	Here Is Mariah Carey (1993)	Fantasy: Mariah Carey at Madison Square Garden (1996)

Here Is Mariah Carey, also known as Mariah Carey or This Is Mariah Carey, (Note: While the title on the video cover is Mariah Carey, the Recording Industry Association of America and the British Phonographic Industry refer to it as Here Is Mariah Carey, and the Syndicat National de l'Édition Phonographique indicates This Is Mariah Carey. The video was officially broadcast on NBC under the title Mariah Carey, two months after being changed from This Is Mariah Carey. Secondary sources use any one of the three names.) is the third video album by American singer Mariah Carey. It presents Carey performing live at Proctor's Theatre in Schenectady, New York, in July 1993, and also includes non-concert footage. Carey performs ten songs during the video; four are from her third studio album Music Box (1993), which Columbia Records commissioned Here Is Mariah Carey to promote. She is sporadically accompanied by a band, choir, dancers, and string musicians. In creating the stage for the performance, production designers sought inspiration from works by Boris Aronson and Josep Maria Jujol. Lawrence Jordan, who collaborated with Carey on previous occasions, directed the hour-long video.

Approximately 4,500 people attended tapings at Proctor's Theater, and 19 million watched it on television network NBC during its original broadcast on November 25, 1993. Columbia Music Video released it on VHS five days later to generally positive reviews from critics. Although they complimented Carey's voice, many felt the non-concert scenes were redundant. Here Is Mariah Carey peaked at number four on the United States video album chart published by Billboard. Earning a Platinum certification from the Recording Industry Association of America, it was one of the best-selling video albums of 1994 and 1995 in that country. The video also spent six weeks at number one on the Official Charts Company's music videos chart in the United Kingdom.

== Background ==
In March 1992, following the release of her first and second studio albums Mariah Carey (1990) and Emotions (1991), Mariah Carey performed a concert on the American television program MTV Unplugged. As she had not toured, Carey sought to establish herself as a capable live performer and disprove notions by critics that her voice was manufactured in a studio. After the concert was well received by her fans and critics alike, Carey's record label—Columbia—released it as an extended play, MTV Unplugged. Its first single, "I'll Be There", became her sixth number-one song on the United States Billboard Hot 100 chart.

By the second quarter of 1993, Carey completed recording material for her third album, Music Box. Before its release later that year, her management team negotiated a deal with NBC for a one-hour television special, Here Is Mariah Carey, to promote the album. The show would allow Carey to warm up for her forthcoming Music Box Tour, reach an audience unable to see her on a tour date, and give Columbia the ability to release it as a video album in time for the 1993 Christmas shopping season. To select a venue for the taping, a Sony Music production crew evaluated almost two dozen theaters in four U.S. states. They chose the 2,700-seat Proctor's Theatre in Schenectady, New York, for its grand architecture, strong acoustics, and proximity to Carey's house with newlywed husband Tommy Mottola. In a chapter from her 2020 memoir The Meaning of Mariah Carey, Carey states that she disagreed with the choice: "Even though it was a beautiful, classic theater, it was not the setting I would have chosen, to be sure; nor would most twenty-year-olds in the early 1990s."

== Production ==
Boris Aronson's sculpture in The Firstborn (1958)

Theatrical scenery in Here Is Mariah Carey (1993)

Rather than being sold, 4,500 tickets for the event were distributed by Carey's fan club, local radio stations, and those with connections to the production. Several rows closest to the stage were reserved for fan club members, and two rows in the middle section were removed for a camera dolly. Most of the filming at Proctor's occurred over two nights on July 15 and 16, 1993, with nine cameras using 35mm film. Carey performed the same set list on each night, and performances from both were used for the video. Her performance of "I'll Be There" with 40 children from the Albany Police Athletic League on stage took place beforehand on July 14. Non-concert footage was primarily filmed at Carey's New York estate. Lawrence Jordan—who directed Carey's MTV Unplugged performance and music videos for "Someday" and "I Don't Wanna Cry"—also directed Here Is Mariah Carey. Due to her fans' presence, Carey considers the video's production the first time she realized her level of fame.

Two set designs which are meant to create an operatic yet funky atmosphere adorn the stage for the concert. The first act features monolithic abstract shapes inspired by Boris Aronson's sculptures in the 1958 Broadway production of The Firstborn that are colored blue-gray to complement Carey's skin tone, and the second features several fabrics and drapery. Both include openings that allow light to protrude while a painted cyclorama acts as a background. Platforms of varying heights and wrought iron railings inspired by those of Josep Maria Jujol are also present. An earlier set design plan which called for a revolving stage that would mechanically rotate between the two acts was changed due to camera and budget limitations. The band—which has a near-identical composition to the one in Carey's MTV Unplugged performance—is situated on the left side of the stage while the background singers are on the right, standing in front of the string players.

== Summary ==
Here Is Mariah Carey switches between scenes of Carey singing in Proctor's Theater and those outside of it. The video begins with Carey telling children from the Albany Police Athletic League to believe in themselves to achieve their dreams. After entering the theater's stage, Carey opens with performances of "Emotions" and "Hero". Her background singers discuss working with her while sitting on a park bench, then Carey sings "Someday" and "Without You". After reminiscing about singing as a child with her mother on the front porch of a building, Carey performs "Make It Happen". In the countryside, she rides a horse and explains her love of nature. Back at the theater, Carey sings "Dreamlover" accompanied by three background dancers, and then "Love Takes Time". While in her house, she cooks pizza with two friends, and they get in a food fight. Afterward, Carey sings "Anytime You Need a Friend" backed by the Refreshing Springs Church Choir. With her friends outside, she discusses her experiences trying to enter the music industry. Carey performs "Vision of Love" and then "I'll Be There" with Trey Lorenz and members of the Albany Police Athletic League on stage. Near the production's wrap party in a grassy field, the band talks about working with her, and Carey and her songwriting partners Walter Afanasieff, David Cole, and Robert Clivillés explain how they collaborate. After Carey discusses the making of the "Dreamlover" music video, it is shown in full.

== Broadcast and release ==
Here Is Mariah Carey was first shown on November 25, 1993, on NBC. As it aired in the November sweeps period, during which Nielsen ratings are used to determine advertisement prices for subsequent months, Richard Huff of the New York Daily News thought this suggested NBC believed it would draw a large audience. Here Is Mariah Carey received 19 million viewers and a rating and share of 11.0/21, meaning 11 percent of American households with a television watched the program, and 21 percent with one in use were tuned in to the special. Out of the primetime network programs, it ranked third for the night, 34th for the week, and fifth among entertainment specials aired during November sweeps. Sales of Music Box resulting from the broadcast caused the album to reach number one on the Billboard 200 chart for the first time. Outside the United States, the special was broadcast in Australia, Canada, and the United Kingdom.

Columbia Music Video issued Here Is Mariah Carey on VHS in the United States on November 30, 1993. It marked Carey's third video release, following The First Vision (1991) and MTV Unplugged +3 (1992). A week later, the video was released in Canada. Releases in the United Kingdom and France followed in February 1994, Hong Kong in December 1996, and a DVD in 2006. Sony Pictures Entertainment released it for digital download and rental worldwide on December 7, 2021. The video is approximately one hour long and includes more non-concert footage plus the "Dreamlover" music video, which were not shown on the NBC broadcast.

Performances from the concert received releases independent of the Here Is Mariah Carey video. In 1993, Columbia released a CD maxi single of "Hero" which includes audio of Carey's Proctor's Theater performance of the song as the second track. The following year, the label released it as a standalone promotional CD single. In 1994, that of "Dreamlover" was included on certain CD singles and twelve-inch singles alongside "Without You" and "Never Forget You". It was later included on a digital maxi single with other versions of the song. Carey's performances of "Hero" and "Without You" are the songs' music videos.

In 2023, for the 30th anniversary of Music Box, Carey released the audio of the performance as the third disc of the deluxe edition for the album.

== Critical reception ==
Professional ratings
Review scores
Source	Rating
Detroit Free Press	3/4 stars
The Indianapolis Star	2.5/4 stars
New Straits Times	3.5/5 stars
Vox	6/10

Here Is Mariah Carey received positive reviews from critics. Steve Holsey of the Michigan Chronicle considered her vocals impressive, the Lansing State Journal's Mike Hughes felt her voice had "moments of luminous beauty", and Steve Morse of The Boston Globe thought she "sings like a songbird". Toronto Star television critic Greg Quill wrote that the performance "affirms her extraordinary vocal abilities". Elaine Lim in the New Straits Times and Roger Catlin in the Hartford Courant agreed that Carey proved she could sing just as well live as in a studio. Morse and Mike Duffy of the Detroit Free Press viewed Carey's rendition of "Without You" as the musical highlight. The latter derided Carey's original songs as dull and derivative, as did Vox's Fred Dellar. Holsey felt Carey lacked the charisma of Whitney Houston or Tina Turner on stage, and author Chris Nickson said she failed to match the versatility Barbra Streisand had in her 1960s television specials.

As well as Carey's performance, critics reviewed the video's production. Hughes thought the concert was perfectly filmed; Quill and Duffy described it as glossy. Tony Squires of The Sydney Morning Herald praised the presentation for omitting cameras in shots despite filming occurring from multiple angles. According to Catlin, the number of filming angles and high quality of the audio "make the delivery sound a little artificial". Quill wrote that it lacked a sense of humanity because it was "dominated by technology". Nickson complimented the sound for being "as clear as a studio recording". He and Variety's Adam Sandler viewed the dancers in the "Dreamlover" performance as out of place.

Carey's depiction received critical commentary. Morse found her life as presented in the home movie footage to be an unlikely reality, and Duffy felt the background singers' comments about her were hard to believe. Several viewed the non-concert segments as unrevealing and unimportant. Though she considered them insignificant, Lim felt they added a sense of warmth to Carey. Steve Hall of The Indianapolis Star thought they projected a girl next door image, and Hughes said the scenes made her seem youthful. According to American Songwriter contributor Jacob Uitti, "her sweet voice and sweetness during this show showcase both her power and potential."

== Commercial performance ==
Here Is Mariah Carey debuted at number 10 on the Billboard Top Music Videos chart for the week ending December 18, 1993. It peaked at number four three weeks later and spent two years on the chart, becoming her longest-charting video. Here Is Mariah Carey was the 10th best-selling video album of 1994 in the United States and ranked at number 27 in 1995. In the United Kingdom, the video debuted at number two on the Official Charts Company's Music Videos chart for the week ending February 26, 1994. It rose to number one the following week, and spent six consecutive weeks atop the chart. Here Is Mariah Carey is certified platinum by the Recording Industry Association of America in the United States, and Gold in the United Kingdom and France by the British Phonographic Industry and the Syndicat National de l'Édition Phonographique, respectively.

== Track listing ==
Credits adapted from VHS inner cover.

No.	Title	Writer(s)	Length
1.	"Emotions"	Mariah Carey; David Cole; Robert Clivillés	3:50
2.	"Hero"	Carey; Walter Afanasieff	3:53
3.	"Someday"	Carey; Ben Margulies	3:38
4.	"Without You"	Pete Ham; Tom Evans	3:43
5.	"Make It Happen"	Carey; Cole; Clivillés	4:20
6.	"Dreamlover"	Carey; Dave Hall	3:51
7.	"Love Takes Time"	Carey; Margulies	3:45
8.	"Anytime You Need a Friend"	Carey; Afanasieff	3:41
9.	"Vision of Love"	Carey; Margulies	3:42
10.	"I'll Be There"	Hal Davis; Berry Gordy; Bob West; Willie Hutch	4:19
11.	"Dreamlover" (music video)	Carey; Hall	3:57

== Credits ==
Personnel adapted from DVD closing credits except where noted.

=== Production ===
- Lawrence Jordan – director
- Mariah Carey – executive producer
- Randy Hoffman – producer
- Al Smith – producer
- Walter Afanasieff – music producer
- Jack Gulick – co-producer
- Daniel Pearl – cinematography
- Cabot McMullen – production design
- Steve Cohen – lighting design
- Diane Martel – choreography, director (track 11), home movie footage
- Emilio "Stretch" Austin Jr. – choreography (track 11)
- Patty Lamagna – associate producer
- Judy Minot – editing
- Michael Maloy – editing
- John Alberts – audio post production
- Mike Guzauski – remix engineer
- Mike Scott – assistant remix engineer
- Vinnie Violandi – colorist
- Wyatt Smith – assistant editor
- John Lowe – assistant director
- Kevin Mazur – photography
- Billy B – make-up for Carey
- Sid Curry – hair for Carey
- Basia Zamorska – stylist

=== Instruments ===
- Walter Afanasieff – keyboards
- Dan Shea – keyboards
- Ren Klyce – keyboards
- Vernon Black – guitar
- Randy Jackson – bass guitar
- Gigi Gonaway – drums
- Peter Michael – percussion
- Gary Cirimelli – MIDI keyboard tech
- Laurie Bishop – strings
- Melanie Evans – strings
- Elaine Gervais – strings
- Linda Hanley – strings
- Margaret Hickey – strings
- Karen Russell – strings
- Paula Shaw – strings
- Martha Vivona – strings

=== Performers ===
- Cindy Mizelle – background vocals
- Deborah Cooper – background vocals
- Melonie Daniels – background vocals
- Kelly Price – background vocals
- Shanrae Price – background vocals
- Trey Lorenz – guest vocals
- Refreshing Springs Church Choir – choir
- Emilio "Stretch" Austin Jr. – dancer
- Henry "Link" McMillan – dancer
- Jamel "Loose Joint" Byrd Brown – dancer

== Charts ==
Weekly chart performance for Here Is Mariah Carey
Chart (1993–1996)	Peak position
UK Music Videos (OCC)	1
UK Videos (OCC)	10
US Top Music Videos (Billboard)	4
US Top Video Sales (Billboard)	14

Year-end chart performance for Here Is Mariah Carey
Chart (1994)	Position
UK Music Video (MRIB)	13
US Top Music Videos (Billboard) (Note: According to Billboard, "the year-end rankings for Top Music Videos are based on accumulated unit sales for each week that a title appeared on the 40 position chart, including the weeks that the chart is not published." It is based on Billboard issues from December 4, 1993, to November 26, 1994.)	10
US Top Video Sales (Billboard) (Note: According to Billboard, the year-end rankings for Top Video Sales are "based on a point system, with points awarded to each title for each week spent on the published charts. The year-end rankings reflect the accumulation of points—based on the number of weeks on the chart, plus positions attained—that each title received during the tracking period." It is based on Billboard issues from December 4, 1993, to November 26, 1994.)	89

Chart (1995)	Position
US Top Music Videos (Billboard) (Note: According to Billboard, "the year-end rankings for Top Music Videos are based on accumulated unit sales for each week that a title appeared on the 40-position chart, including the weeks that the chart is not published." It is based on Billboard issues from December 3, 1994, to November 25, 1995.)	27

== Certifications ==
Region	Certification	Certified units
France (SNEP)	Gold	10,000*
United Kingdom (BPI)	Gold	25,000^
United States (RIAA)	Platinum	100,000^
* Certified units based on sales.^ Certified units based on shipments.
