= Vanishing (song) =

1990 song by Mariah Carey

Song by Mariah Carey

from the album Mariah Carey
- A-side: "Love Takes Time": "Emotions"
- Released: June 12, 1990
- Studio: Power Station: The Hit Factory; (New York City)
- Genre: Traditional pop; gospel; R&B
- Length: 4:11
- Label: Columbia
- Songwriters: Mariah Carey; Ben Margulies
- Producer: Mariah Carey

Audio
- "Vanishing" on YouTube

"Vanishing" is a song recorded and produced by American singer-songwriter Mariah Carey for her debut studio album, Mariah Carey (1990). Carey wrote the torch song with drummer Ben Margulies before signing her 1988 recording contract with Columbia Records. In describing the demise of a romantic relationship, the lyrics detail how a lover is slowly disappearing from the other's life. Categorized in the gospel and traditional pop music genres, "Vanishing" is a ballad with a blues-inspired composition in which Carey's vocals are accompanied solely by an acoustic piano played by Richard Tee.

Upon the release of Mariah Carey, music critics compared "Vanishing" to other tracks on the album and several named it the record's best. Regarded as one of Carey's premier works from her career, the song has received a positive reception in retrospective reviews. After performing "Vanishing" live at a New York City club and on American television program Saturday Night Live in 1990, she included it in the set list of her 1993 Music Box Tour. American singers Syesha Mercado and Kelly Clarkson performed live cover versions.

== Background and release ==
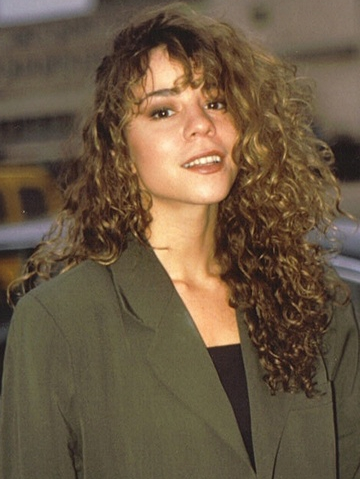
Mariah Carey (pictured in 1990) wrote "Vanishing" with Ben Margulies before she had signed with Columbia Records.

As a teenager in the mid- to late 1980s, American singer Mariah Carey began a songwriting partnership with drummer Ben Margulies. One of their songs, "Vanishing", was present on Carey's demo tape that prompted Columbia Records to offer her a recording contract in 1988. The pair wrote most of the songs on her debut studio album Mariah Carey, which Columbia released on June 12, 1990. Situated as the fifth song, following production-heavy "Someday", "Vanishing" has a sparer sound compared to the other tracks. It was the first song Carey produced by herself and the only one she did so for the album.

Carey described "Vanishing" as her favorite track on the album: "I enjoyed doing that because it gave me more freedom to sing and it was the most personal song to me." Rather than releasing it as a single, Columbia issued "Vanishing" as the B-side to Carey's songs "Love Takes Time" (1990) and "Emotions" (1991). It was also present on the 1992 "I'll Be There" maxi single. In 2010, Columbia and Legacy Recordings included "Vanishing" on two compilation albums: The Essential Mariah Carey and Playlist: The Very Best of Mariah Carey. Relatively unknown among the general public, the song is a deep cut favored by Carey's fans.

== Composition ==
A blues-inspired gospel and "traditional" pop and R&B number, "Vanishing" is a torch song in the form of a ballad. Its lyrics are about one's anguish amid the gradual end of a romantic relationship: "Searching for spirits of the past / Just a trace of your existence to grasp." According to Andrew Chan, author of Why Mariah Carey Matters, the song "conveys romantic loss through metaphors of physical disappearance and occluded perception". The music, composed by Carey and Margulies, has a slow tempo and a melody that oscillates. Its composition lasts for four minutes and eleven seconds; an acoustic piano played by Richard Tee is the sole instrumentation. Carey considered bolstering it with other sounds such as drums to make it more commercially viable but opted to "preserve the integrity of the song – leave it really simple".

The track was engineered and mixed by Patrick Dillett at Power Station and The Hit Factory studios in New York City. It was mastered by Bob Ludwig at New York's Masterdisk. Jill Warren of The Indianapolis Star considered the composition haunting and Melissa A. Jacques of the St. Petersburg Times said it evoked "spine-tingling emotion and spirituality".

"Vanishing"
"Vanishing" features Carey's vocals accompanied by an acoustic piano.

Carey's voice ranges from muted whispering to high-pitched whistle tones. She does not use her full vocal range during the first two verses; the styles of melisma and riffing appear in the song's latter half. Her first use of belting, a full-throated sound, occurs during the bridge. Carey concludes with a crescendo at the end of the song. Her vocal performance received comparisons to the vocals of American singers Aretha Franklin, Tramaine Hawkins, and Suzanne Vega.

== Critical reception ==
"Vanishing" received limited critical commentary upon the release of Mariah Carey. Music writers contrasted it with other songs on the album; several named it the best track. According to Stephen Holden of The New York Times, it exhibited Carey's reverence for gospel music more than others. Many praised Carey's singing for showing restraint and prowess. Similarly positive sentiments regarding Carey's vocal performance and artistry on the song recurred in retrospective album reviews.

Critics have viewed "Vanishing" as an underrated and standout track in Carey's discography. Courier-Post contributor Jeff Hall considered the song her best work in 1993 and Vincent Stephens named it one of Carey's finest album tracks in a 2000 review for academic journal Popular Music and Society. In 2020, Billboard staff as a whole ranked it as the seventh-best song of Carey's career. According to Chan, "Vanishing" is the most beautiful ballad among her early recordings and its lyrics are unusually advanced compared to others in this period such as "Can't Let Go" (1991).

== Live performances ==
Carey performed "Vanishing" while promoting Mariah Carey in 1990. On October 22 that year, she sang it at the Tatou club in New York City and received positive retrospective reviews. Footage of the performance was included on 1991 video album The First Vision and its audio was later released on The Live Debut – 1990, a 2020 digital extended play. Carey reprised the song on October 29, 1990, at American television program Saturday Night Live, following "Vision of Love". Rolling Stone writer Christopher R. Weingarten ranked it at number 19 on a 2017 list of the best musical performances in the show's history. Carey later sang "Vanishing" during the 1993 Music Box Tour as a dedication to Tee, who died before the shows began. Several critics described it as one of the concert's better performances.

Other artists have performed live cover versions of "Vanishing". Several critics praised the vocal performance of American singer Syesha Mercado, who sang it as a contestant on the seventh season of television program American Idol in 2008. Rodney Ho of The Atlanta Journal-Constitution remarked the rendition was "controlled yet emotional, lovely". In 2020, American singer Kelly Clarkson sang "Vanishing" a cappella at her home during the COVID-19 pandemic.

== Credits and personnel ==
- Recorded and mixed at Power Station and The Hit Factory (New York City)
- Mastered at Masterdisk (New York)

- Mariah Carey – songwriter, producer, arranger, lead vocals, background vocals
- Ben Margulies – songwriter, arranger
- Patrick Dillett – engineering, mixing
- Richard Tee – piano
- Bob Ludwig – mastering
