= Music Box Tour =

1993 concert tour by Mariah Carey

- National tour by Mariah Carey
- Tour program cover
- Location: North America
- Associated album: Music Box
- Start date: October 29, 1993
- End date: December 10, 1993
- Legs: 1
- No. of shows: 7

Mariah Carey concert chronology
- Music Box Tour (1993); Daydream World Tour (1996)

The Music Box Tour was the debut concert tour in 1993 by American singer-songwriter Mariah Carey, in supporting her Diamond-certified third studio album, Music Box (1993). It was Carey's first headlining tour, visiting six cities in the United States. The tour lasted seven shows, beginning on November 3 in Miami (Florida) and ending on December 10 in New York City (New York).

== Background ==
American singer Mariah Carey experienced commercial success with her 1990 debut album on Columbia Records; four of its singles topped the US Billboard Hot 100 chart. Citing the possibility of career overexposure and stress on her voice, she declined to participate in a concert tour and instead recorded her second album, Emotions (1991). Executives at Columbia, including its head Tommy Mottola, agreed with an emphasis on recording rather than live performance for financial reasons. They also sought to keep Carey and her public image sheltered from potential negative press coverage. Carey later recalled: "If I went out after the first album, [critics] would have said, 'She doesn't look comfortable.'"

As with Mariah Carey, no concerts were scheduled to accompany Emotions. Despite Columbia's encouragement of Carey to boost the album's comparatively lower sales by touring, she remained disinclined due to her preference for the studio. Both albums were largely promoted by Carey with occasional performances at television programs and awards shows. These events marked her first experiences in a live setting; unlike many artists, Carey never sang at small venues before signing with Columbia because she "just wanted to do my demos and do other odd jobs and keep the music separate".

By 1992, Carey faced growing aspersions from critics that she was unable to sing as well live compared to her studio recordings. To counter these claims while reaching her fans and a broader audience in lieu of touring, Carey performed on the television program MTV Unplugged in March that year. While her songs largely eschewed live instrumentation, 30-minute MTV Unplugged concerts were distinguished by an acoustic format. Broadcast to positive critical reception, the event helped present Carey as a capable live performer and gave her the confidence to tour. With her first full-length concert, Here Is Mariah Carey (1993), she came to realize performing was not an issue because she could be herself on stage.

Columbia released Carey's third album, Music Box, in August 1993. Before its release, the label began organizing plans for Carey to promote the record with a series of concerts. Criticisms for not touring continued to percolate her public image at the time. In September, it was announced that Carey would visit up to six cities in the United States for her first concerts, entitled the Music Box Tour. To ensure she could maintain a healthy voice while touring, a limited number of shows were scheduled on non-consecutive days. Further dates in 1994 were planned in the United States, Europe, and Japan, if the initial tour was successful.

== Concert synopsis ==
The performers took the stage to the recorded music of "They Call the Wind Mariah" from the musical Paint Your Wagon. The show featured Carey's main collaborator at the time Walter Afanasieff on keyboards along with a band. A gospel choir appeared on a few numbers, a practice that Carey would revive on some future tours. Dancers were present on stage, but Carey did not dance with them, an avoidance she would maintain until doing a little bit of dancing in her 1996 Daydream World Tour. Unlike her future tours, however, Carey kept costume changes to a minimum, with at most one before an encore. The show was about 80 minutes long.

The shows' set list was focused on her hits, with occasional non-singles from her studio albums mixed in. The one new song she introduced was her rendition of The SOS Band's 1983 R&B hit "Just Be Good to Me", which she introduced as "one of my favorite 'old school' songs."

== Reception ==
Carey's opening concert at the Miami Arena before 15,000 people drew national media attention. Carey later related that "I was OK until I had to walk up this ramp on to the stage and I heard this deafening scream and it was kinda like everything in my life, this whole incredible whirlwind I'd been going through, it had all been leading up to that insane moment and there I was.... And then they killed me. Not the audience – they knew it was my first show, they were very supportive. I got really bad reviews, though. Well, there were a lot of critics out to get me: this girl's sold all these albums, she's never toured, let's get her. So they did. I turned on the TV in bed that night and the CNN guy was saying, 'The reviews are in and it's bad news for Mariah Carey.' It really hurt me a lot."

Carey expressed that she used her anger to improve her next performance at the Worcester Centrum, and got "rave reviews" as a result. The Boston Globe called it "a spectacular performance [which] bowled over the crowd with a confidence that grew before their very eyes", after Carey "shook off her nervousness at the start." Further, her highest-visibility performance in the tour closer at Madison Square Garden in New York City got a very positive review from Jon Pareles of The New York Times, although The Bergen Record gave mixed notices to the sold-out show. But overall the impression was, especially framed by the opening night, that most critics gave negative reviews to the Music Box Tour. In response, Carey said, "As soon as you have a big success, a lot of people don't like that. There's nothing I can do about it. All I can do is make music I believe in."

Carey would avoid North America on her next two tours, the 1996 Daydream World Tour and the 1998 Butterfly World Tour, and would not tour the continental United States again until seven years later during the 2000 Rainbow World Tour.

== Set list ==
1. "They Call the Wind Mariah" (Introduction)
2. "Emotions"
3. "Love Takes Time"
4. "Now That I Know"
5. "Without You"
6. "Dreamlover"
7. "Someday"
8. "I Don't Wanna Cry"
9. "Vanishing"
10. "Make It Happen"
11. "Hero"
12. "All in Your Mind"
13. "Just Be Good to Me"
14. "Good Times (Theme Song)" (Interlude)
15. "Anytime You Need a Friend"
16. "I'll Be There" (With Trey Lorenz)
17. "Vision of Love"
18. "Emotions Reprise" (Outro)

Notes:

- "Santa Claus Is Comin' to Town" and "Dreamlover (David Morales Remix)" were performed in New York City.

== Shows ==
List of concerts, showing date, city, country, venue, tickets sold, and number of available tickets
| Date | City | Country | Venue | Attendance |
|---|---|---|---|---|
| October 29, 1993 | Amherst | United States | Mullins Center | —N/a |
| November 3, 1993 | Miami | United States | Miami Arena | 9,600 / 15,000 |
| November 9, 1993 | Worcester | United States | Worcester Centrum | 11,046 / 11,500 |
| November 17, 1993 | Rosemont | United States | Rosemont Horizon | 9,438 / 9,438 |
| November 23, 1993 | Los Angeles | United States | Universal Amphitheatre | —N/a |
| December 2, 1993 | Philadelphia | United States | The Spectrum | 12,000 / 12,000 |
| December 10, 1993 | New York City | United States | Madison Square Garden | 15,050 / 15,627 |
| Total | | | | 57,134 / 63,565 (89%) |

== Personnel ==
- Walter Afanasieff – musical director, piano, organ
- Randy Jackson – bass
- Ren Klyce – keyboards
- Dan Shea – keyboards
- Vernon Black – guitar
- Gregory "Gigi" Gonoway – drums
- Peter Michael – percussion
- Melonie Daniels – background vocals
- Kelly Price – background vocals
- Cheree Price – background vocals
- Deborah Cooper – background vocals
- Katreese Barnes - background vocals
- Trey Lorenz – special guest vocalist
