= List of Billboard 200 number-one albums of 1991 =

The album chart name changed from "Top Pop Albums" to "Billboard 200 Top Albums" on September 7, 1991. The highest-selling albums and EPs in the United States are ranked in the Billboard 200, which is published by Billboard magazine. In 1991, a total of 14 albums claimed the top of the chart. One of which, American rapper Vanilla Ice's To the Extreme started its peak on the issue dated November 10, 1990, and spent 8 weeks atop the chart in 1991.

Mariah Carey's self-titled debut album was the longest running number-one album of the year, spending 11 consecutive weeks atop the chart and was the best-selling album of 1991. Starting in 1991, Billboard began using Nielsen Soundscan data for its album chart, which provided more precise and accurate sales figures. The first date to use this methodology was the June 1, 1991 dated chart when the number one album was Out of Time by R.E.M., which topped the chart with sales of 89,000.

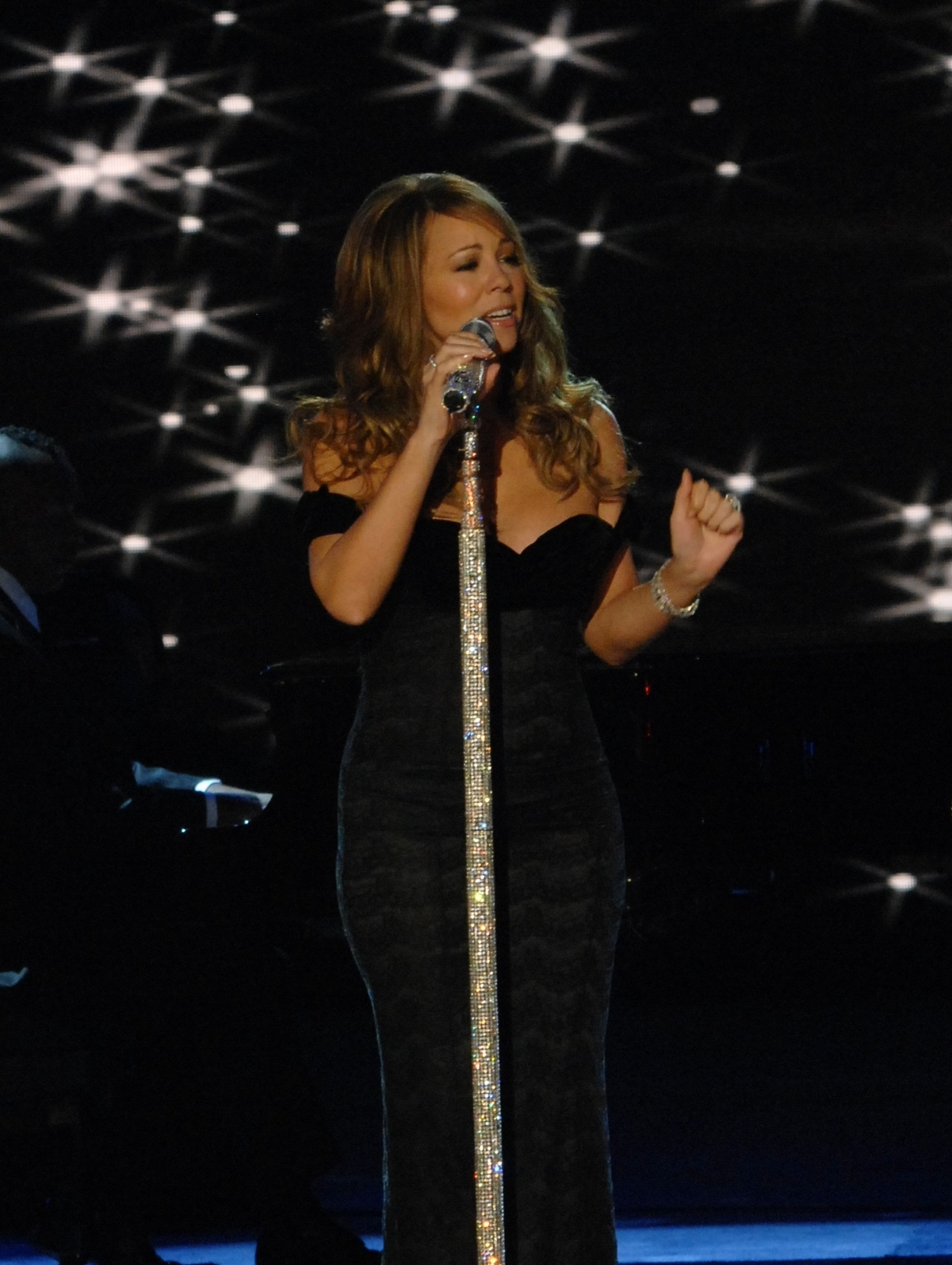
Mariah Carey topped the chart with her self-titled album Mariah Carey; it stayed in its position for 11 weeks.

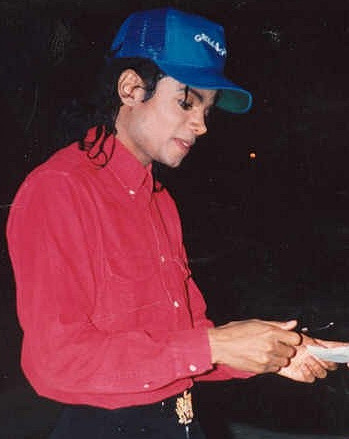
Michael Jackson's Dangerous was his third straight album to top the Billboard 200.

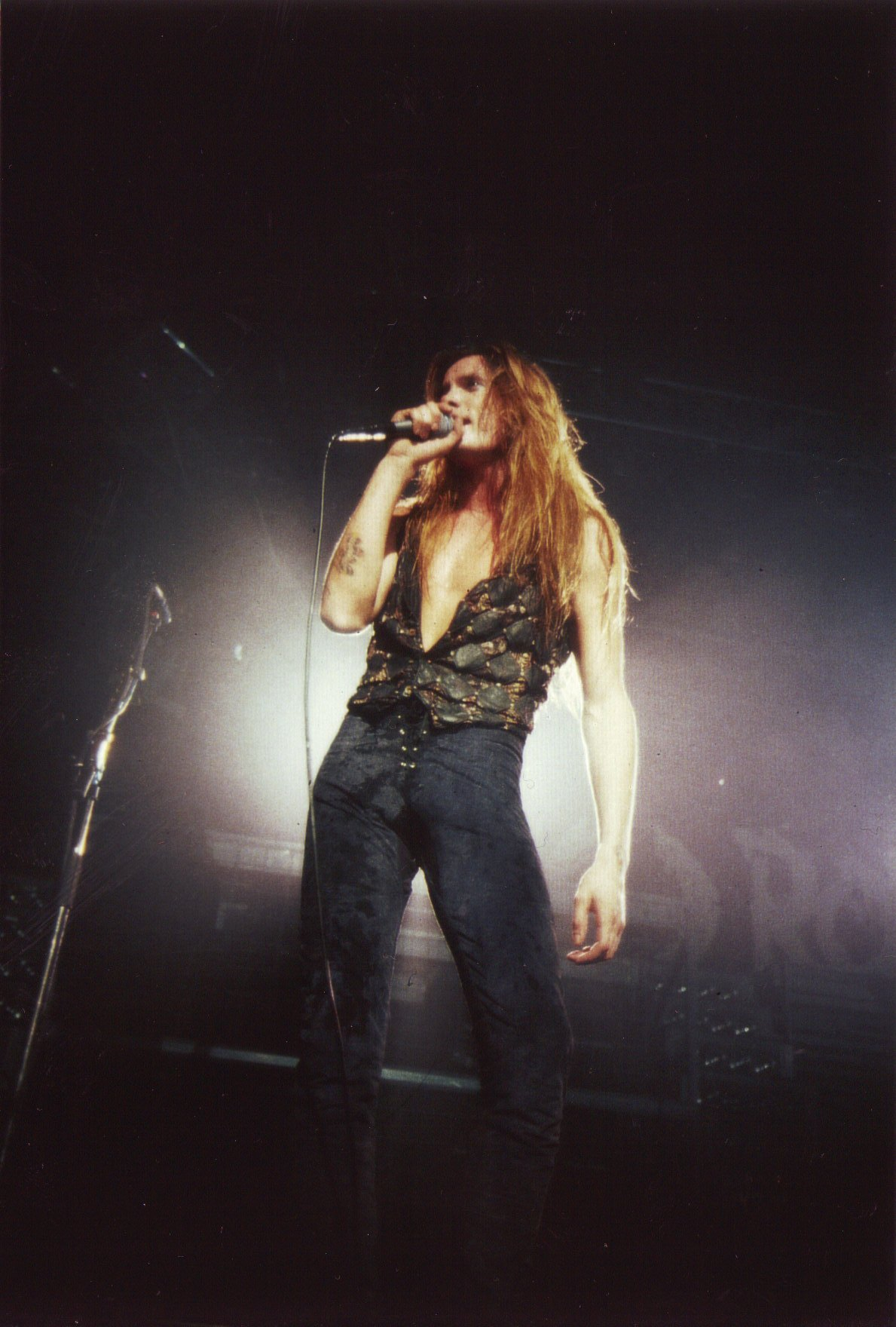
Slave to the Grind by Skid Row (singer Sebastian Bach pictured) was the first album to debut at number one in the Soundscan era.

== Chart history ==
Key
†	Indicates best performing album of 1991
	Indicates #1 album before Nielsen SoundScan tracked sales

Issue date	Album	Artist(s)	Sales	Ref.
January 5	To the Extreme	Vanilla Ice		
January 12	To the Extreme	Vanilla Ice		
January 19	To the Extreme	Vanilla Ice		
January 26	To the Extreme	Vanilla Ice		
February 2	To the Extreme	Vanilla Ice		
February 9	To the Extreme	Vanilla Ice		
February 16	To the Extreme	Vanilla Ice		
February 23	To the Extreme	Vanilla Ice		
March 2	Mariah Carey †	Mariah Carey		
March 9	Mariah Carey †	Mariah Carey		
March 16	Mariah Carey †	Mariah Carey		
March 23	Mariah Carey †	Mariah Carey		
March 30	Mariah Carey †	Mariah Carey		
April 6	Mariah Carey †	Mariah Carey		
April 13	Mariah Carey †	Mariah Carey		
April 20	Mariah Carey †	Mariah Carey		
April 27	Mariah Carey †	Mariah Carey		
May 4	Mariah Carey †	Mariah Carey		
May 11	Mariah Carey †	Mariah Carey		
May 18	Out of Time	R.E.M.		
May 25	Time, Love & Tenderness	Michael Bolton		
June 1	Out of Time	R.E.M.	89,000	
June 8	Spellbound	Paula Abdul	88,000	
June 15	Spellbound	Paula Abdul	89,000	
June 22	Niggaz4Life	N.W.A	154,000	
June 29	Slave to the Grind	Skid Row	134,000	
July 6	For Unlawful Carnal Knowledge	Van Halen	243,000	
July 13	For Unlawful Carnal Knowledge	Van Halen	195,000	
July 20	For Unlawful Carnal Knowledge	Van Halen	142,000	
July 27	Unforgettable... with Love	Natalie Cole	517,000	
August 3	Unforgettable... with Love	Natalie Cole	329,000	
August 10	Unforgettable... with Love	Natalie Cole	287,000	
August 17	Unforgettable... with Love	Natalie Cole	211,000	
August 24	Unforgettable... with Love	Natalie Cole	170,000	
August 31	Metallica	Metallica	598,000	
September 7	Metallica	Metallica	290,000	
September 14	Metallica	Metallica	213,000	
September 21	Metallica	Metallica	171,500	
September 28	Ropin' the Wind	Garth Brooks	300,000	
October 5	Use Your Illusion II	Guns N' Roses	770,000	
October 12	Use Your Illusion II	Guns N' Roses	340,000	
October 19	Ropin' the Wind	Garth Brooks	254,000	
October 26	Ropin' the Wind	Garth Brooks	270,000	
November 2	Ropin' the Wind	Garth Brooks	230,000	
November 9	Ropin' the Wind	Garth Brooks	220,000	
November 16	Ropin' the Wind	Garth Brooks	190,000	
November 23	Ropin' the Wind	Garth Brooks	175,000	
November 30	Ropin' the Wind	Garth Brooks	167,000	
December 7	Achtung Baby	U2	295,000	
December 14	Dangerous	Michael Jackson	326,500	
December 21	Dangerous	Michael Jackson	378,000	
December 28	Dangerous	Michael Jackson	370,000	

== See also ==
- 1991 in music
- List of number-one albums (United States)
