= There's Got to Be a Way =

1991 single by Mariah Carey

Single by Mariah Carey

from the album Mariah Carey
- Released: May 20, 1991
- Recorded: February 1990
- Studio: Cove City Sound; Power Station, New York City
- Genre: Pop; gospel; R&B
- Length: 4:52
- Label: Columbia
- Songwriters: Mariah Carey; Ric Wake
- Producers: Ric Wake; Narada Michael Walden

Mariah Carey singles chronology
"I Don't Wanna Cry" (1991)	"There's Got to Be a Way" (1991)	"Emotions" (1991)

Music video
- "There's Got to Be a Way" on YouTube

"There's Got to Be a Way" is a song recorded by American singer-songwriter Mariah Carey for her eponymous debut studio album (1990). Columbia Records released it as the fifth and final single from the album in the United Kingdom and several European countries on May 20, 1991. The song did not perform well on the charts of those countries. A five-track digital extended play containing remixes of the song was released in July 2020 as part of the 30th-anniversary celebrations of her debut album and career.

"There's Got to Be a Way" is a pop, gospel, and R&B song. Its lyrics denounce the existence of poverty, racism and war in the world that gradually becomes more aspirational and hopeful. Music critics felt it was too political. Also at this time, although Carey had some success in a few countries worldwide, she did not have an extremely large following outside of the United States. Her international profile on the music scene would begin to rise somewhat with the release of her third album, Music Box (1993). An accompanying music video for the song highlights social injustices. In May 2020, Carey performed a snippet of the song in a video posted online in response to the murder of George Floyd.

== Background and release ==
"There's Got to Be a Way" was composed by Mariah Carey and Ric Wake for Carey's self-titled debut studio album (1990); the lyrics were written by Carey, while she and Wake composed the music. It was written during Carey and Wake's first recording session together. They composed four songs, but only "There's Got to Be a Way" was chosen for the final track listing. Co-produced by Wake and Narada Michael Walden, it appears as the second of eleven songs on the track listing.

The track was recorded in February 1990 and engineered by Bob Cadway at Cove City Sound Studios and The Power Station, both located in New York City; he was assisted by Dana Jon Chappelle. It was mixed by David Frazer at Tarpan Studios in San Rafael. The keyboards, bass and rhythm engineering was carried out by Louis Biancaniello, while Joe Franco performed the percussion, Vernon "Ice" Black played the guitar, and Rich Tancredo also performing on the keyboards. Walter Afanasieff played the synth horns. Carey provided her own background vocals along with Billy T. Scott, Jamiliah Muhammed and The Billy T. Scott Ensemble. The song was released in the United Kingdom as the fifth and final single on May 20, 1991.

On July 24, 2020, Carey released a five-track digital extended play of the song as part of her 30th-anniversary celebrations of her debut album Mariah Carey. Titled There's Got to Be a Way EP and released in tandem with an eight-track EP of "Someday", it contains "hard-to-find and unreleased makeovers" of the original album track, including both the 7-inch and 12-inch versions (the latter of which was previously only available on vinyl), the "Vocal Dub Mix" and "Alt. Vocal Dub Mix", as well as the "Sample Dub Mix", with the third and fifth being previously unreleased. Gil Kaufman of Billboard called its release a "revelation" for fans in the United States, owing to "There's Got to Be a Way" originally released only in the United Kingdom.

== Composition ==
"There's Got to Be a Way" is an R&B-pop and gospel song lasting for a duration for four minutes and 52 seconds. The song begins with Carey publicly decrying the existence of war, poverty and racism in the world, and she uses the bridge to shift the lyrics towards an uplifting and aspirational tone. A "peaceful, political anthem," the theme of social activism can be heard in the lyrics "There's got to be a way/ To connect this world today/ Come together to relieve the pain/ There's got to be a way/ To unite this human race/ And together we'll bring on a change." Carey goes on to suggest that we should be more tolerant of each other and not resort so readily to war in the lyrics "Couldn't we accept each other / Can't we make ourselves aware."

== Critical reception ==
The song was released in the UK and several other European countries, but did not become a major hit in any territory. However, upon the album's release, J.D. Considine from The Baltimore Sun named it one of the album's better songs, describing it as "gloriously engaging". However, music critic Robert Christgau felt that Carey was coming off as too political. Ralph Novak, David Hiltbrand, and David Grogan of People gave overall mixed reviews, writing that "she does so much with so little." However, they gave positive remarks to Carey's clarity. To mark twenty-five years since the release of the album Mariah Carey in June 1990, Billboard writer Trevor Anderson wrote a track-by-track review of the album in June 2015. He noted that "There's Got to Be a Way" follows the same melodic tone as the album's opener "Vision of Love", but highlighted their stark lyrical differences, as the former is about social activism and the latter is about love. Although he praised Carey's vocals, he felt that "the aim for broad appeal comes at the expense of memorable lyrics."

Similarly in December 2015, Kelsey McKinney of the G/O Media owned Splinter News compiled a selection of reviews of how Carey and her debut album were received in 1990; "There's Got to Be a Way" was mentioned in Alan Niester's review for the Canadian publication The Globe and Mail where he writes Carey tries to emulate Whitney Houston and fails. He commented that Carey's vocals were reminiscent of already established female singers such as Houston and Lisa Stansfield, with Houston especially influencing Carey on songs such as "Alone in Love". He also writes that Carey has vocal ability "worth watching," but what she is singing vocally is more interesting than what she is singing lyrically.

== Music video ==
The accompanying music video for "There's Got to Be a Way" begins with a shot of an empty street, followed by clips of disadvantaged and poorer members of society going about their daily activities. Two men play dominoes on a wooden crate outside a building, a gang make fun of an elderly man hanging newspapers outside his store and an obese woman walks down the street. Clips of Carey leaning against a wall and sitting on some steps looking on at what is happening are shown. As the first chorus begins, everyone starts to dance joyfully in the street and help those in need. A gospel choir comes out of one of the buildings as the street becomes more crowded with people of all ages and backgrounds rejoicing and getting along with each other. One of the shops in the background has a neon light outside the entrance which says "Jesus Saves." At the end of the video, a crowd gathers around Carey as she sings the final lyrics to the song. The crowd includes a young Tahj Mowry.

== Live performance ==
Carey performed a couple of lines of the song for the first time in a short video on May 30, 2020, in response to the murder of George Floyd, an African American man killed during his arrest by Derek Chauvin, a White American police officer, in Minneapolis on May 25. Carey posted the video clip online, singing the lyrics "I don't understand how there can be regulated bigotry. There's got to be a way to connect this world today," focusing on its lyrics denouncing racism. She captioned the video with "I wrote this song for my first album. Still looking for answers today. We have to make a change. We can't be silent," followed by the hashtag Black Lives Matter and an encouragement to her fans to donate to the Color of Change campaign to prohibit the officers involved from working in law enforcement in the future and to be prosecuted for Floyd's murder.

== Formats and track listings ==
- European 12"
1. "There's Got to Be a Way" (12" Remix) – 8:21
2. "There's Got to Be a Way" (Alt. Vocal Dub Mix) – 6:44
3. "There's Got to Be a Way" (7" Remix) – 4:50
- European Maxi CD
1. "There's Got to Be a Way" – 4:52
2. "I Don't Wanna Cry" – 4:47
3. "There's Got to Be a Way" (12" Remix) – 8:21
- UK Cassette Single
1. "There's Got to Be a Way" (Album Version) – 4:51
2. "There's Got to Be a Way" (7" Remix) – 4:50
- UK Maxi CD
1. "There's Got to Be a Way" – 4:51
2. "There's Got to Be a Way" (12" Remix) – 8:21
3. "There's Got to Be a Way" (Alt. Vocal Dub Mix) – 6:44

- UK Picture Disc Maxi CD
1. "There's Got to Be a Way" – 4:51
2. "There's Got to Be a Way" (7" Remix) – 4:50
3. "Someday" (7" Jackswing Mix) – 4:40
4. "Vision of Love" – 3:28
- UK 12" promo
1. "There's Got To Be a Way" (12" Remix) – 8:21
2. "There's Got To Be a Way" (Alt. Vocal Dub Mix) – 6:44
3. "There's Got To Be a Way" (Sample Dub Mix) – 6:00
4. "There's Got To Be a Way" (7" Remix) – 4:50
- There's Got to Be a Way EP
1. "There's Got to Be a Way" (7" Remix) – 4:53
2. "There's Got to Be a Way" (12" Remix) – 8:21
3. "There's Got to Be a Way" (Vocal Dub Mix) – 7:06
4. "There's Got to Be a Way" (Alt. Vocal Dub Mix) – 6:46
5. "There's Got to Be a Way" (Sample Dub Mix) – 6:04

== Charts ==
Weekly chart performance for "There's Got to Be a Way"
Chart (1991)	Peak position
Europe Airplay (Music & Media)	48
Sweden Airplay (Airplay Sweden)	13
UK Singles (OCC)	54
UK Singles (MRIB)	42
UK Club (Music Week) 12" Remix	76
UK Airplay (ERA)	21
UK Airplay (Music & Media)	18

== Release history ==
Release dates and formats for "There's Got to Be a Way"
Region	Date	Format(s)	Label(s)	Ref.
United Kingdom	May 20, 1991	7-inch vinyl; 12-inch vinyl; cassette; CD; picture disc CD	Columbia	
Various	July 24, 2020	Digital download; streaming (EP)	Legacy	
