= Love Takes Time =

1990 single by Mariah Carey

Single by Mariah Carey

from the album Mariah Carey
- B-side: "Sent from Up Above"; "Vanishing"; "You Need Me"
- Released: August 21, 1990
- Recorded: May 1990
- Studio: The Plant (Sausalito, California); The Hit Factory (New York City)
- Genre: Pop; R&B
- Length: 3:49
- Label: Columbia
- Composers: Mariah Carey; Ben Margulies
- Lyricist: Mariah Carey
- Producer: Walter Afanasieff

Mariah Carey singles chronology
"Vision of Love" (1990)	"Love Takes Time" (1990)	"Someday" (1990)

Music video
- "Love Takes Time" on YouTube

"Love Takes Time" is a song recorded by American singer Mariah Carey for her eponymous debut studio album (1990). Written by Carey and Ben Margulies, while produced by Walter Afanasieff, the song was released as the second single from the album on August 21, 1990, by Columbia Records. An adult contemporary-influenced ballad, the song follows its protagonist lamenting the loss of a lover and confesses that "love takes time" to heal and that her feelings for her ex-lover remain.

Carey quickly recorded "Love Takes Time" at the last minute when the album was already considered complete and being processed for release. She played the song's demo to former Columbia CEO Don Ienner while on an airplane. Ienner and other officials wanted the song to be included on her upcoming album, even though the album was already going through final stages of completion and Carey wanted to save it for her sophomore effort. The song made it on to the album as the closing track, however, due to its late addition, it was not listed on the earliest pressings of the album, an issue that was corrected on subsequent pressings.

"Love Takes Time" was well received by music critics and went to become another success from the album in North America. It was Carey's second number-one single in the United States, attaining the position for three weeks. However, the song did not replicate the success of its predecessor, "Vision of Love", globally. A music video was provided for the song, filmed in black and white at a beach. "Love Takes Time" has been included on Carey's compilation album Greatest Hits (2001), as well as #1 to Infinity (2015). "Love Takes Time" was performed live on shows such as The Arsenio Hall Show, Mariah's Thanksgiving NBC Special and The Des O'Connor Show. Since its release, the song has been included on set lists of Carey's concert tours and residencies.

== Writing and recording ==
Carey's debut album was completed and being mastered when she wrote the song with Ben Margulies. Margulies said: "It was sort of a gospelish thing I was improvising, then we began working on it. It was on a work tape that we had...and we recorded a very quick demo. It was just a piano vocal demo - I played live piano, and she sang it." Carey was on a mini-tour of ten states promote her debut single "Vision of Love", playing acoustically with a piano player and three back-up singers. While on a company plane, she played the demo of "Love Takes Time" for Columbia Records president Don Ienner. "All the important guys were on the plane," Margulies said. "Tommy Mottola, Ienner, and Bobby Colomby." Carey was told the song was a "career-maker" and that it had to go on the first album. She protested, as her album was already being mastered and she intended the ballad for her next release.

The demo was sent to producer Walter Afanasieff. When Carey flew west to work with Narada Michael Walden on some tracks for her first album, Tommy Mottola and Don Ienner were impressed with Afanasieff's work and gave him an executive staff producer job with the label. Afanasieff recalled: "I guess to see if he made the right choice, [Mottola] called me up one day. He said, 'We've got this Mariah Carey album done, but there's a song that she and Ben Margulies wrote that is phenomenal, and I want to try everything we can to put it on the album.' I said, 'What do you want me to do?' and he said, 'You only have a couple of days, but are you ready to cut it?' I couldn't believe the opportunity that it was. I'd never produced anything by myself up until that time."

The demo was very close to what Mottola wanted the finished product to be, according to Afanasieff: "We cut the song and the music and the basics in about a day - and the only reason is this deadline. It was do it or we were gonna miss out on the whole thing. We got the tape and recorded everything and we got on the plane and went to New York [and] did her vocals. She did all the backgrounds, practically sang all night...We came back to the studio that afternoon, and we had to fix one line very quickly, and then [engineer] Dana Jon Chappelle and I got back on the plane with the tape, went back to the studio in Sausalito, and mixed it. So it was a three-day process: a day and a half for music, kind of like a day for vocals, and a day for mixing."

Afanasieff heard from Columbia executives as soon as they received the mix. They wanted Carey's vocal a little louder, so a remix was quickly completed. The producer asked if the song would still make the debut album, and was told: "We're going to do our best." When the album was released, "Love Takes Time" was not listed on neither cassette nor CD pressings. Margulies said: "And so the song's on there, but it doesn't say that it's on there. It was a song that actually was strong enough to stop the pressing...I don't know if they had to throw away a few hundred copies."

== Composition ==
"Love Takes Time" is performed in the key of B Major in common time with a slow tempo of 63 beats per minute. Carey's vocals span three octaves and five semitones from D♯_{3} to G♯_{6} in the song.

The lyrics have received scholarly analysis regarding femininity. Dorothy Marcic categorized "Love Takes Time" as a "compliant victim song" in which the narrator "struggles with feeling incomplete and losing her mind since he left". According to Lanice R. Avery et al., the song represents hegemonic femininity through the expression of emotion, which is conveyed through lyrics such as "Love takes time / To heal when you're hurting so much / Couldn't see that I was blind / To let you go / I can't escape the pain / Inside." For Julija Vaitonytė and Julija Korostenskienė, the 1990s pop song metaphor "love is a unity (of two complementary parts)" is present in the lyrics "Losing my mind / From this hollow in my heart / Suddenly I'm so incomplete", suggesting that "losing a loved one implies losing a part of oneself".

== Critical reception ==
Professional ratings
Review scores
Source	Rating
Entertainment Weekly (2006)	A
Entertainment Weekly (2012)	B
Stereogum	7/10

"Love Takes Time" garnered a positive reception upon its release. Many music critics described the song as beautiful or emotional. Diane Rufer and Ron Fell of the Gavin Report called it "an awesome ballad of heroic proportions" and Billboard said Carey surpassed expectations. According to Cash Box, "Carey keeps things simmering at a low heat, slowly unveiling the power and beauty of her voice." Record Mirror critic Robin Smith called it "very pretty, very nice, but strangely soulless and cold."

Entertainment Weekly wrote, "With just the softest synthesizer tinkle, a touch of percussion, and what may well have been a borrowed pair of back-porch wind chimes, she made every last listener feel the utter despair of a breakup: "Losing my mind/From this hollow in my heart/Suddenly I’m so incomplete."" In 2015, Est 1997 writer Mario stated that it was an ″Adult Contemporary ballad″ and that it was "arguably some of the strongest melodies and bridge in Mariah’s catalog." He continued by saying that ″Her vocals are so pure and passionate that every emotion filters through the music and just reaches and warms the heart. It’s the realisation of a universal truth by a young woman who’s still learning to deal with feelings. There’s almost a sense of naivety in the lyrics but, at the same time, the song sounds mature and it’s relatable. That’s a constant in Mariah’s catalog, something that has marked her strength and endurance as a writer."

During a review of her 2001 Greatest Hits album in May 2002, Devon Powers of PopMatters praised the song along with "I Don't Wanna Cry", calling it "stupendous" and said that ″Her lyrics were exactly what you wanted them to be: simple, memorable, and absolutely true." Stephen Filippelli from Review Stream called the song decent, but mainly criticized the music video for the song. Amanda Dobbins and Lindsay Weber of Vulture listed "Love Takes Time" at number-nineteen on their list of "Mariah Carey’s 25 Best Singles". OO Cities called the song a "beautiful ballad".

== Accolades ==
"Love Takes Time" won a BMI R&B Award for Song of the Year and Songwriter Award. The song also won Carey the 1991 Soul Train Music Award for Best R&B/Urban Contemporary New Artist.

== Commercial performance ==
In the United States, "Love Takes Time" debuted at number 73 on Hot 100 Singles in the Billboard issue dated September 15, 1990. It peaked at number one for three weeks in November 1990. Following "Vision of Love", which previously spent four weeks atop the chart, this made Carey the thirteenth artist to have two number one songs from a debut album. She also became the thirteenth artist (Note: And second solo woman) to reach number one with their first two chart entries, and the second artist to do so with both entries lasting at least three weeks at number one, after the Four Seasons in 1962. "Love Takes Time" spent a total of 26 weeks on the Hot 100; it remained Carey's third best-performing song on the chart as of 2018. It also topped Hot Adult Contemporary and Hot R&B Singles, giving Carey her second consecutive number one on both charts. The Recording Industry Association of America certified the single gold in 1990 and platinum in 2023.

Internationally, "Love Takes Time" failed to emulate its US success in any other market except Canada, where it reached number two on the Canadian RPM Top Singles chart. It did reach the top ten in Iceland and New Zealand, but did not make much of an impact elsewhere, becoming a moderate top-20 hit in Australia, and a top-40 hit in the United Kingdom and the Netherlands. It failed to reach the top 40 in Germany, peaking at number 57.

== Music video ==
The single's video was filmed on July 24, 1990 and directed by Jeb Brien and Walter Maser. It features Carey walking around a beach after a man walks away with luggage in Venice, Los Angeles. The video was not included on Carey's video compilation #1's (1999) and was replaced with a live performance of the song, filmed at Proctor's Theatre in Schenectady, New York in 1993. (Note: The performance video for "Love Takes Time" was originally released as part of Carey's third video album Here Is Mariah Carey (1993).)

== Live performances ==
Carey performed the song at The Arsenio Hall Show, later she performed the song at shows like Des O'Connor Tonight, It's Showtime At The Apollo and The Tonight Show with Johnny Carson. Three years later, in 1993, she performed the song in the special Here Is Mariah Carey, filmed at Proctor's Theatre. Carey performed the song on several concert tours, including the Music Box Tour (1993), Australian Tour 2013, and Caution World Tour (2019). She included in the set list of her Las Vegas concert residency #1 to Infinity and a 2019 standalone concert at King Abdullah Economic City in Saudi Arabia.

== Track listing and formats ==
- European 12-inch vinyl and maxi-CD singles
1. "Love Takes Time"
2. "Sent from Up Above"
3. "Vanishing"
- UK 12-inch vinyl
1. "Love Takes Time"
2. "You Need Me"
3. "Vanishing"
- Worldwide 7-inch vinyl, CD and Japanese CD3 singles
1. "Love Takes Time"
2. "Sent from Up Above"
- UK 7-inch vinyl and cassette singles
1. "Love Takes Time"
2. "Vanishing"
- UK CD single
1. "Love Takes Time"
2. "Vanishing"
3. "You Need Me"
- UK limited edition picture disc CD single
1. "Love Takes Time"
2. "Vanishing"
3. "You Need Me"
4. "Vision of Love"

== Credits and personnel ==
- Recorded at The Plant Studios (Sausalito, California) and The Hit Factory (New York City)
- Mixed at The Plant Studios (Sausalito, California)
- Mastered at Masterdisk (New York)
- Mariah Carey – songwriter, vocal arranger, lead vocals, background vocals
- Ben Margulies – songwriter
- Walter Afanasieff – producer, arranger, keyboards, synthesizer, synthesizer bass and drums
- Dana Jon Chappelle – engineering, mixing
- Manny LaCarrubba – additional engineering
- David Frazer – mixing
- Louis Biancaniello – programming
- Ren Klyce – programming
- Howie Weinburg – mastering

== Charts ==
=== Weekly charts ===
Weekly chart performance for "Love Takes Time"
Chart (1990–1991)	Peak position
Australia (ARIA)	14
Belgium (Ultratop 50 Flanders)	38
Canada Retail Singles (The Record)	1
Canada Contemporary Hit Radio (The Record)	2
Canada Top Singles (RPM)	2
Canada Adult Contemporary (RPM)	1
Europe (European Hot 100 Singles)	75
Germany (GfK)	57
Iceland (Íslenski Listinn Topp 10)	9
Israel (IBA)	8
Italy Airplay (Musica e dischi)	13
Netherlands (Dutch Top 40)	24
Netherlands (Single Top 100)	24
New Zealand (Recorded Music NZ)	9
Switzerland Airplay (Schweizer Hitparade)	15
UK Singles (Official Charts)	37
UK Singles (MRIB)	42
UK Airplay (Music Week)	17
US Hot 100 Singles (Billboard)	1
US Hot Adult Contemporary (Billboard)	1
US Hot R&B Singles (Billboard)	1
US Top 40/Dance (Billboard)	1
US Top 40 Radio Monitor (Billboard)	1
US Cash Box Top 100	1
US Top R&B Singles (Cash Box)	1
US Adult Contemporary (Gavin Report)	2
US Top 40 (Gavin Report)	1
US Urban Contemporary (Gavin Report)	1
US Adult Contemporary (Radio & Records)	1
US Contemporary Hit Radio (Radio & Records)	1
US Urban Contemporary (Radio & Records)	1

=== Year-end charts ===
Year-end chart performance for "Love Takes Time"
Chart (1990)	Position
Canada Top Singles (RPM)	24
Canada Adult Contemporary (RPM)	19
US Billboard Hot 100	76
US Hot R&B Singles (Billboard)	75
US Adult Contemporary (Radio & Records)	24
US Contemporary Hit Radio (Radio & Records)	20
US Urban (Radio & Records)	20

Year-end chart performance for "Love Takes Time"
Chart (1991)	Position
Australia (ARIA)	83
Canada Retail Singles (The Record)	3
US Billboard Hot 100	69
US Adult Contemporary (Billboard)	24

=== Decade-end charts ===
Decade-end chart performance for "Love Takes Time"
Chart (1990–1999)	Position
Canada (Nielsen SoundScan)	93

=== All-time charts ===
All-time chart performance for "Love Takes Time"
Chart (1958–2018)	Position
US Billboard Hot 100	199

== Certifications ==
Certifications and sales for "Love Takes Time"
Region	Certification	Certified units/sales
Australia (ARIA)	Gold	35,000^{‡}
United States (RIAA)	Platinum	1,000,000^{‡}
^{‡} Sales+streaming figures based on certification alone.

== Release history ==
Release dates and formats for "Love Takes Time"
Region	Date	Format(s)	Label(s)	Ref.
United States	August 21, 1990	7-inch vinyl; cassette	Columbia	
Japan	October 21, 1990	Mini CD	Sony Music Japan	
United Kingdom	October 29, 1990	7-inch vinyl; 12-inch vinyl; cassette; CD	CBS	

== See also ==
- List of Billboard Hot 100 number-one singles of 1990
- List of number-one adult contemporary singles of 1990 (U.S.)
- List of number-one R&B singles of 1990 (U.S.)

== Bibliography ==
- Avery, Lanice R.; Ward, L. Monique; Moss, Lolita; Üsküp, Dilara (2017). "Turning Gender: Representations of Femininity and Masculinity in Popular Music by Black Artists". Journal of Black Psychology. 43 (2): 159–191. doi:10.1177/0095798415627917.
- Downey, Pat; Albert, George; Hoffman, Frank (1994). Cash Box Pop Singles Charts 1950–1993. Libraries Unlimited. ISBN 1-56308-316-7. OL 1105653M.
- Hoffman, Frank (2016) [2008]. Chronology of American Popular Music, 1900–2000. New York: Routledge. ISBN 978-0-415-97715-9.
- Lwin, Nanda (1997). Canada's Top Hits of the Year 1975–1996. Music Data Canada. p. 106. ISBN 1-896594-10-7.
- Lwin, Nanda (2000). Top 40 Hits: The Essential Chart Guide. Music Data Canada. ISBN 1-896594-13-1.
- Marcic, Dorothy (2002). Respect: Women and Popular Music. New York: Texere. ISBN 1-58799-083-0. OL 3956472M.
- Nickson, Chris (1998). Mariah Carey Revisited: An Unauthorised Biography. St. Martin's Press. ISBN 0312195125.
- Ryan, Gavin (2011). Australia's Music Charts 1988-2010. Mt. Martha, VIC, Australia: Moonlight Publishing.
- Vaitonytė, Julija; Korostenskienė, Julija (2015). "Feminine Imagery in Contemporary American Pop Songs: A Contrastive Analysis". Sustainable Multilingualism (6): 109–131. doi:10.1177/0095798415627917.
