= Mariah Carey (album) =

Studio album by Mariah Carey
- Released: June 12, 1990
- Recorded: December 1988 – May 1990
- Studios: Skyline Recording Studios (New York City, New York); Cove City Sound Studios (Glen Cove, New York); Power Station (New York City, New York); Tarpan Studios (San Rafael, California); The Plant Studios (Sausalito, California); The Hit Factory (New York City, New York); Oakshire Recorders (Los Angeles, California); Shakedown Studios (New York City, New York)
- Genres: Pop; R&B; soul
- Length: 46:44
- Label: Columbia
- Producers: Walter Afanasieff; Rhett Lawrence; Ben Margulies; Ric Wake; Mariah Carey; Narada Michael Walden

Mariah Carey chronology
Mariah Carey (1990)	Emotions (1991)

Singles from Mariah Carey
- 1. "Vision of Love" Released: May 15, 1990; 2. "Love Takes Time" Released: August 22, 1990; 3. "Someday" Released: November 28, 1990; 4. "I Don't Wanna Cry" Released: March 1991; 5. "There's Got to Be a Way" Released: May 20, 1991

Mariah Carey is the debut studio album by American singer Mariah Carey. It was released on June 12, 1990, by Columbia Records. Its music incorporates a range of genres with a mix of slow ballads and up-tempo tracks. Originally, she wrote four songs with Ben Margulies, which solely constituted her demo tape. After Carey was signed to Columbia, all four songs, after being altered and partially re-recorded, made the final cut for the album. Aside from Margulies, Carey worked with a range of professional writers and producers, including Rhett Lawrence, Ric Wake and Narada Michael Walden, all of whom were hired by then-Columbia Chief executive officer (CEO), Tommy Mottola.

Mariah Carey received generally positive reviews, with critics praising Carey's vocal performance and technique, but were ambivalent towards the songwriting. It became a commercial success, topping the US Billboard 200 for eleven consecutive weeks. Mariah Carey was certified nine-times platinum by the Recording Industry Association of America (RIAA), denoting shipments of nine million copies in the US. The album experienced similar success in Canada, where it topped the charts and was certified seven-times platinum. Mariah Carey fared well in other worldwide territories, reaching the top ten of charts in Australia, the Netherlands, New Zealand, Norway, Sweden and the UK. Worldwide, the album has sold more than 15 million copies.

Five singles were released from the album, four of which reached number-one on the US Billboard Hot 100. Her debut single, "Vision of Love" was chosen as the album's lead single, topping the charts in Canada, New Zealand and the US. The song was critically lauded, and is regarded as one of the greatest debut singles by a female artist. With the following three singles, "Love Takes Time", "Someday" and "I Don't Wanna Cry" reaching number one in the US, Carey became the first artist since the Jackson 5 to have their first four singles top the charts in the United States.

== Background ==
"For this particular time, she is my number one priority. We don't look at her as a dance-pop artist. We look at her as a franchise."

— Don Ienner, president of Columbia Records, on his plans for working with Carey

In 1988, a 19-year-old Mariah Carey moved out of her mother's house in Long Island, and into a small apartment on New York City's Manhattan Island. She had a demo tape consisting of four songs, which she had written during her high school years with Ben Margulies. As 1988 unfolded, Carey still had no record deal, and struggled to draw the attention of record executives in New York. While working several jobs, she continued writing and producing music with Margulies, making changes and additions to the demo. After months of difficulty, Carey met with singer Brenda K. Starr, and soon began singing back-up for her. Eventually, Starr began hearing what she described as "glimpses" of Carey's voice throughout sessions, and noticed her "gifted voice". She realized Carey was capable of achieving success, but only needed help to break through into mainstream music.

One night, Starr took Carey to a record industry gala, attempting to convince a record label executive to listen to her demo. Jerry L. Greenberg, president of Atlantic Records took notice of her. As Carey handed him the record, Tommy Mottola quickly grabbed the tape, insisting that he would deal with "the project". As Mottola got into his limousine later that evening, he played Carey's demo and quickly realized the talent that he had just discovered. He quickly returned to the event, but a discouraged Carey had already left.

After a week of tracking her down through Starr's management, Mottola got in touch with Carey and brought her over to Columbia Records. After meeting with Carey and her mother Patricia for the first time, Mottola said, "When I heard and saw Mariah, there was absolutely no doubt that she was in every way destined for super-stardom." After a few brief meetings, Carey was signed to Columbia in December 1988.

Mottola had assumed the top position at Sony, the parent label of Columbia, and began taking the company through various stages of change. He believed it was very important for the label's success to discover a young and very talented female vocalist, to rival Whitney Houston from Arista Records, or a pop star to match Madonna, who was signed to Sire Records at the time. Mottola felt that Carey represented both. His confidence in Carey led him to hire a range of talented and well-known musicians and songwriters to assist with Carey's demo, as well as to create new material. Among them were Ric Wake, Narada Michael Walden, and Rhett Lawrence.

== Recording and composition ==
"When we met she was 17 years old and I was 24. We worked together for a three-year period developing most of the songs on the first album. She had the ability just to hear things in the air and to start developing songs out of them. Often I would sit down and start playing something, and from the feel of a chord, she would start singing melody lines and coming up with a concept."

— Ben Margulies, about his collaboration with Carey

Carey and Ben Margulies began writing prior to Carey's signing, and had composed over fourteen songs; seven of which earned a place on the album. Originally, Carey and Margulies planned to produce the entire album as well, an idea her label did not permit. On the album, Carey worked with a range of producers and writers, including from Ben Margulies, Rhett Lawrence, Narada Michael Walden, Ric Wake and Walter Afanasieff; the latter would continue working extensively with Carey on future projects. Mottola asked L.A. Reid and Babyface to work on the album, but the duo declined due to wanting to exclusively produce for artists signed to their own LaFace Records.

As production for the album began, Carey worked with Walden in New York, where they produced "I Don't Wanna Cry". While he described Carey as "very shy", he noted how professional she was for someone her age. Additionally, Carey wrote "There's Got to Be a Way" during her first recording session with Wake. During the session, they wrote four songs, but they only produced the latter song for the album. After flying to New York and working with Carey, Walden was astonished by her voice. Together, they collaborated on transforming many of the demo's songs into more commercial recordings, which took place in Tarpan Studios in San Rafael, California. For her work with Lawrence, Carey traveled to New York once again. In the studio, she presented him with the demo of "Vision of Love" which she had written with Margulies years prior. Lawrence saw "potential" in the song, but he did not think much of it in its early stages. He described the song's sound as having a "fifties sort of shuffle". According to Lawrence, Carey needed a more contemporary sound, so they met in the studio alongside Margulies and producer Chris Toland. They added a new arrangement to the original chord progression, while Carey changed the song's melody and key. Afterwards, Margulies added few drum notes to the arrangement, including additional guitar and bass notes.

"I was using my upper register...what happened was at the end of it, I did these vocal flips. When I was doing it, my voice split and went into a harmony. If you hear it, it splits. I was saying, 'Get rid of that,' but everyone was saying 'No way, we're keeping that'."

— Carey, on the high notes she hit while experimenting with her voice in the studio

Carey worked with Walden on several songs including "I Don't Wanna Cry". Together, they decided to "slow down the tempo" and create a "crying type of ballad", one which according to him, featured a direct inspiration from gospel genres. After they completed the song, Lawrence noted how much of a perfectionist Carey was. He said that after finishing the song, she returned to the studio the following week, all in order to correct "one line" that troubled her. As one of the four original songs she gave to Mottola, "Someday" became Wake's favorite from the start, "I loved that song right from the beginning...Then Mariah called me one day and said 'I'd love to do it if you want to do it.' It was great, I'm glad she called me." During its recording, Carey revealed how the song came into existence. She had been working on the demo with Margulies in his studio. As he began playing different notes on the electric keyboard, Carey directed him on the chord changes, while providing the chorus, lyrics and melody. In "All in Your Mind", Carey does a great vocal performance, doing staccatos up to F7. According to the artist, her voice "split" while doing those ornaments. While she thought to remove it from the song's recording, Wake and Walden were very impressed by the vocal flips, claiming that it would fit in perfectly.

By May 1990, the debut album was being mastered when Carey wrote "Love Takes Time" with Ben Margulies. Margulies said, "It was sort of a gospelish thing ... and we recorded a very quick demo. It was just a piano vocal demo – I played live piano, and she sang it." Carey was on a mini-tour of ten states to promote "Vision of Love", playing acoustically with a piano player and three back-up singers. While on a company plane, she played the demo of "Love Takes Time" for Columbia Records president Don Ienner. "All the important guys were on the plane," Margulies said. "Tommy Mottola, Ienner, and Bobby Colomby." Carey was told the song was a "career-maker", and that it had to go on the first album. She protested – her album was already being mastered, and she intended this ballad for her next release.

The demo was sent to producer Afanasieff. When Carey flew west to work with Narada Michael Walden on some tracks for her first album, Tommy Mottola and Don Ienner were impressed with Afanasieff's work and gave him an executive staff producer job with the label. "I guess to see if he made the right choice, (Tommy) called me up one day," remembers Afanasieff. "He said, 'We've got this Mariah Carey album done, but there's a song that she and Ben Margulies wrote that is phenomenal, and I want to try everything we can to put it on the album.' I said, 'What do you want me to do?' and he said, 'You only have a couple of days, but are you ready to cut it?' I couldn't believe the opportunity that it was. I'd never produced anything by myself up until that time." The demo was very close to what Mottola wanted the finished product to be, according to Afanasieff. "We cut the song and the music and the basics in about a day – and the only reason is this deadline. It was do it or we were gonna miss out on the whole thing. We got the tape and recorded everything and we got on the plane and went to New York (and) did her vocals. She did all the backgrounds, practically sang all night...We came back to the studio that afternoon, and we had to fix one line very quickly, and then (engineer) Dana (Jon Chapelle) and I got back on the plane with the tape, went back to the studio in Sausalito, and mixed it. So it was a three-day process: a day and a half for music, kind of like a day for vocals, and a day for mixing."

Afanasieff heard from Columbia executives as soon as they received the mix. They wanted Carey's vocal a little louder, so a remix was quickly completed. The producer asked if the song would still make the debut album, and was told, "We're going to do our best." On the first copies of the album that were printed, "Love Takes Time" was not listed on the cassette or compact disc liner notes, even though the song was on the cassette or CD itself. "(On) some of the original first copies of the record, they didn't have time to print the name of the song," Margulies laughs. "And so the song's on there, but it doesn't say that it's on there. It was a song that actually was strong enough to stop the pressing...I don't know if they had to throw away a few hundred copies."

== Promotion ==
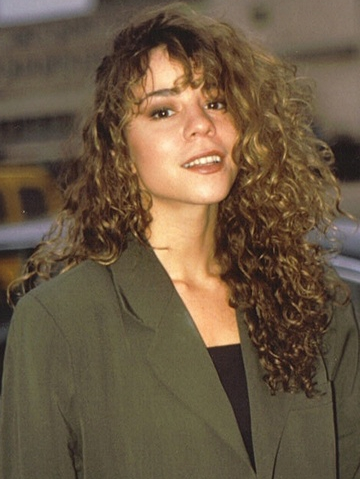
Carey (pictured in 1990) promoting "Vision of Love" on The Wogan Show

Aside from the heavy marketing and promotional campaign held by Sony Music, Carey performed on several television programs and award ceremonies, stateside and throughout Europe. Carey's first televised appearance was at The Arsenio Hall Show, where she sang "Vision of Love" for the first time, on June 1, 1990. Four days after the performance, she appeared at the 1990 NBA Playoffs where she sang "America the Beautiful". Soon after, she performed "Vision of Love" back-to-back on both The Tonight Show and her second appearance at The Arsenio Hall Show. In September 1990, Carey appeared on Good Morning America where she performed an a cappella version of "Vision of Love", alongside the Billy T. Scott Ensemble. "Vision of Love" was performed on various other American television shows such as Saturday Night Live, Showtime at the Apollo, The Oprah Winfrey Show and the 1991 Grammy Awards, as well as European programs such as The Veronica Countdown (the Netherlands), Le monde est la vous (France), Kulan (Sweden) and Wogan (United Kingdom). Carey has performed "Vision of Love" on most of her tours, except her Angels Advocate Tour in 2010, where it was absent from the setlist.

Promotion for the album continued with Carey's follow-up singles. "Love Takes Time" was performed on The Arsenio Hall Show, Showtime at the Apollo and The Tonight Show Starring Johnny Carson, as well as Carey's debut showcase at The Tattoo Club. In Europe, "Love Takes Time" was also performed in Pop Formule (the Netherlands), Kulan (Sweden) and Des O'Connor Tonight (United Kingdom). The third single from Mariah Carey, "Someday", was performed at the 1991 American Music Awards which helped it reach number one in the United States. Carey's fourth single "I Don't Wanna Cry", reached the top of the Hot 100 without any immediate promotion, as Carey had not performed the song until her Music Box Tour in 1993. As promotion for Mariah Carey ended, Sony released a fifth single "There's Got to Be a Way", in the UK. Most of the album's singles were performed live throughout Carey's short Music Box Tour. Both "Vision of Love" and "I Don't Wanna Cry" were performed on Carey's Asian and European Daydream World Tour (1996).

=== Singles ===
"Vision of Love" was the first single released from the album and became one of the most popular and critically praised songs of Carey's career. Additionally, "Vision of Love" is credited with bringing the use of melisma to the 1990s and inspiring various future talents. "Vision of Love" was nominated for three 1991 Grammy Awards: Best Female Pop Vocal Performance (which it won), Record of the Year and Song of the Year. The song received the Soul Train Music Award for Best R&B/Soul Single, Female and a Songwriter Award at the BMI Pop Awards. In the United States, it peaked at number one on the Billboard Hot 100, during the week of August 2, 1990, staying atop the chart for four consecutive weeks. "Vision of Love" reached number one in Canada and New Zealand as well, and appeared within the top ten in Australia, Ireland, the Netherlands and the United Kingdom. Aside from its chart success, the song was lauded by music critics. In a retrospective review on the album in 2005, Entertainment Weekly called the song "inspired" and complimented Carey's use of the whistle register in the song. Additionally, Rolling Stone said that "the fluttering strings of notes that decorate songs like 'Vision of Love', inspired the entire American Idol vocal school, for better or worse, and virtually every other female R&B singer since the nineties." Bill Lamb from About.com said that "'Vision of Love' is one of the best songs of Mariah's recording career [...] It is simply one of the most stunning debut releases ever by a pop recording artist."

"Love Takes Time" served as the album's second single, released on August 22, 1990. The song became Carey's second single to top the Billboard Hot 100. While the song achieved strong success stateside, "Love Takes Time" peaked at number two in Canada, it barely charted inside the top ten in New Zealand and outside the top 20 in Germany, the Netherlands and the United Kingdom. "Someday" (the album's third single) followed a similar pattern as "Love Takes Time", reaching number one in the US and Canada. In Australia, it peaked outside the top 40, and hit number 38 in France and the UK. "I Don't Wanna Cry", the album's fourth single, also topped the charts in the United States. The song became Carey's fourth chart topper in the US, finishing number 25 on Billboard's year-end chart. Aside from peaking at number two in Canada, it charted at number 49 in Australia. A fifth single, "There's Got to Be a Way", was released in Europe but only charted in the United Kingdom, where it peaked at number fifty-four.

== Critical reception ==
=== Initial ===
Professional ratings
Review scores
Source	Rating
Boston Herald	B+
Chatelaine	2/4 stars
Chicago Tribune	3.5/4 stars
Entertainment Weekly	B−
The Knoxville News-Sentinel	5/5 stars
New Straits Times	2.5/5 stars
The Philadelphia Inquirer	2/4 stars
Smash Hits	7/10
South China Morning Post	4/5 stars
The Village Voice	C

Mariah Carey received mixed reviews. Upon release, music critics universally praised Carey's vocal ability. However, reviewers were more critical of the album's lyrics and production, reporting that her material lacked a distinct musical identity.

In a 1990 review, Entertainment Weekly wrote that Carey possessed an "astonishing vocal range and high ideals", but criticized the album's lyrical content. Robert Christgau was more critical in The Village Voice, unenthusiastically touching on the opera roots of Carey's mother while finding much of the material clueless about its love themes. Jan DeKnock from the Chicago Tribune was more impressed by the album, finding it abundant with "sparkling tracks" that showcase Carey's songwriting and production talents, particularly "Vanishing". Among the more mixed reviews, some critics found she was "all voice, no substance".

Mariah Carey was nominated for the 1991 Grammy Award for Album of the Year, while "Vision of Love" received nominations in the categories of Song of the Year, Record of the Year and Best Female Pop Vocal Performance. Carey won for Best Female Pop Vocal Performance and also received the award for Best New Artist.

=== Retrospective ===
Professional ratings
Review scores
Source	Rating
AllMusic	4/5 stars
MusicHound	3.5/5
Q	4/5 stars
The New Rolling Stone Album Guide	3/5 stars
The Rolling Stone Album Guide	3/5 stars
The Encyclopedia of Popular Music	3/5 stars

In The Rolling Stone Album Guide (2004), Arion Berger later wrote that "Carey debuted with an album of uplifting dance pop and R&B ballads, each song's composition co-credited to Carey and each providing an opportunity to unleash her wide vocal range." Ashley S. Battel from AllMusic found the record "extremely impressive" and described the songs as "smooth-sounding ballads and uplifting dance/R&B cuts" on an album that served "as a springboard for future successes". "Carey establishes a strong standard of comparison for other breakthrough artists of this genre", Battel concluded. Billboard's Trevor Anderson found the album more concerned with producing hits than "introducing the world to the woman behind the seismic scales and piercing high notes", it achieves the former "to a remarkable degree".

=== Accolades ===
Accolades for Mariah Carey
Publication	Accolade	Rank	Ref.
Complex	The Best R&B Albums of '90s	50	

== Commercial performance ==
Mariah Carey entered the US Billboard 200 at number 80, and reached the top 20 in its fourth week. The album topped the chart in its 36th week, due to the success of "Someday" and then later Carey's exposure at the 33rd Annual Grammy Awards, and stayed there for 11 consecutive weeks; to date, it is the longest stay at number one in Carey's career. It remained in the top 20 for 65 weeks and on the Billboard 200 for 113 weeks. Mariah Carey was certified nine-times Platinum by the RIAA on December 15, 1999. The album has sold 4,885,000 copies in the United States, according to Nielsen SoundScan, which began counting sales after January 1, 1991. It became the best-selling album of 1991 in the United States. In Canada, the album peaked at number one on the Canadian RPM Albums Chart during the week of April 20, 1991. To date, Mariah Carey is certified seven-times Platinum by the Canadian Recording Industry Association (CRIA), denoting shipments of 700,000 copies.

During the week of September 15, 1990, Mariah Carey entered the UK Albums Chart at its peak of number six. After spending 40 weeks fluctuating in the chart, the album was certified Platinum by the British Phonographic Industry (BPI), denoting shipments of 300,000 copies. In Sweden, the album debuted at number 29 during the week of August 1, 1990, before peaking at number eight on its fourth week, spending 16 weeks on the charts, and eventually being certified Platinum in the country. In the Netherlands, the album debuted at number 91 during the week of July 21, 1990, eventually peaking at number 6 on its tenth week, spending a total of 46 weeks on the charts and being certified Platinum. In Norway, the album debuted at number 19, and reached its peak at number four on its seventh week. Elsewhere in Europe, Mariah Carey reached the top-twenty in Switzerland; the top-thirty in Germany and Finland; and the top-forty in Hungary and Spain.

The album peaked at number six in Australia, where it went 5× Platinum and finished sixth on the ARIA Charts year-end top 50 albums chart of 1991. In New Zealand, the album debuted at number 12 during the week of September 2, 1990, before peaking at number four two weeks later, spending a total of 57 weeks on the charts and being certified 4× Platinum in the country, where it finished 12th on the Recorded Music NZ year-end chart of 1991. Worldwide sales of the album stand at 15 million copies.

== Legacy ==
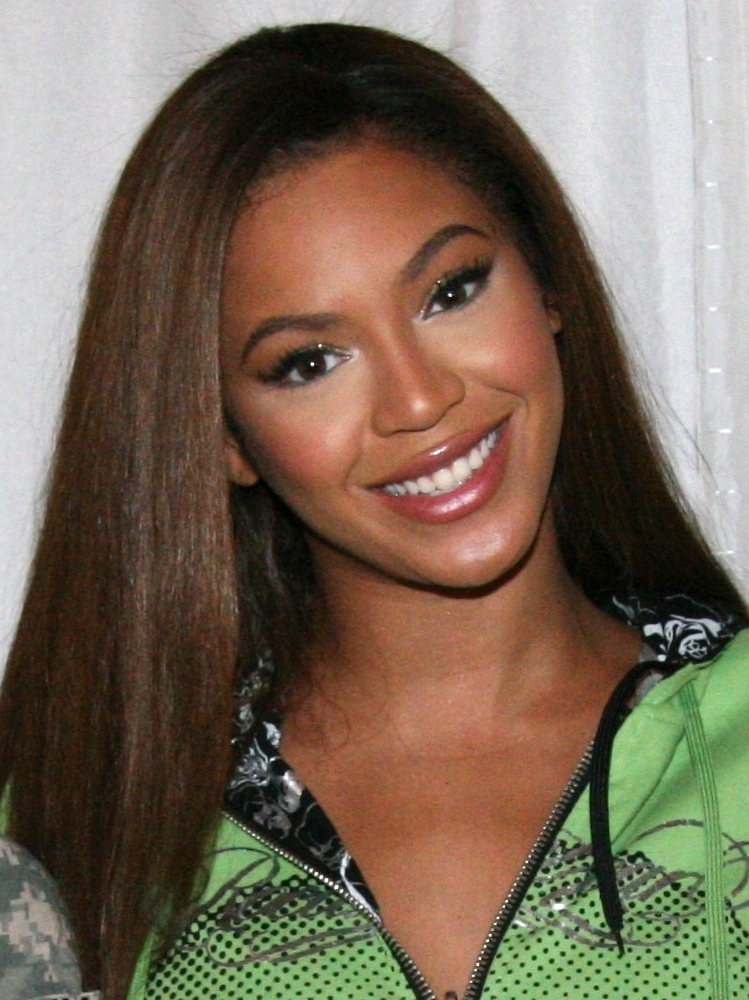
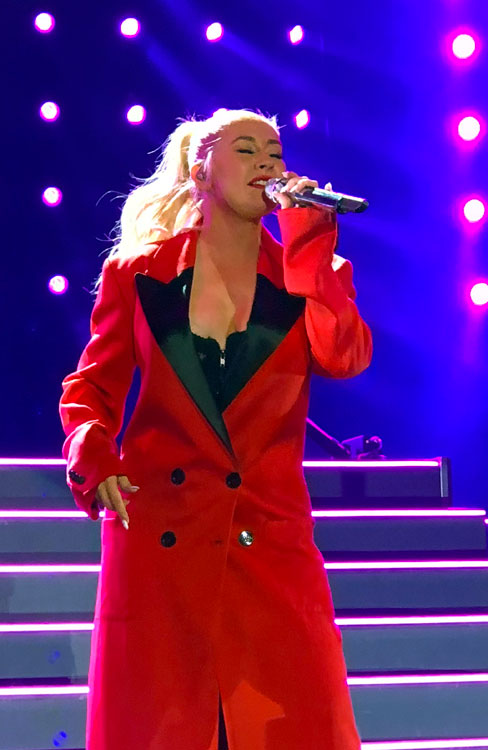
Beyoncé (left) and Christina Aguilera (right) have credited Mariah Carey as an influence.

Since its release, Mariah Carey has been hailed as a pop and R&B classic, with Trevor Anderson of Billboard describing it as jumpstarting "one of the most successful stories in pop music history". Anderson noted that the album propelled Carey to the forefront of a saturated female popstar market, which included Whitney Houston, Janet Jackson, and Madonna.

The widespread influence of Carey's vocal delivery on the album, particularly "Vision of Love", has also been noted by critics. According to Chloe Sarmiento of Grammy.com, Carey's vocal performance on the album set a new high standard for artists across multiple genres in the music industry. Writing for Complex, Elena Bergeron described the record as "the album that launched a million runs", stating that it "gave an entire generation of would-be divas something to sing into their hairbrushes". Beyoncé said that she began doing vocal "runs" after listening to "Vision of Love" for the first time, stating that it inspired her to follow a path into the music industry. Christina Aguilera has also stated how Carey's album had the biggest influence on her vocal stylings and delivery. According to the Pier Dominguez, author of Christina Aguilera: A Star is Made, Carey's carefully choreographed image of a grown woman struck a chord with Aguilera, whose influence also stemmed from the fact that both were of mixed heritage.

Carey's two wins at the 33rd Annual Grammy Awards was also commented upon by critics, particularly in regards to the lip-syncing controversy surrounding Milli Vanilli the prior year. Speaking to the press after winning Best New Artist, Carey stated: "With all the controversy surrounding this award, I hope to bring it back to a real singer-songwriter category, where everyone else following me can be as proud as I am to receive this honor". The singer's performance of "Vision of Love" at the ceremony has consistently been ranked as one of the greatest award show performances of all time. Andrew Unterberger of Billboard described it as showcasing Carey "in full beast mode, tracing her unprecedented vocal runs with her hands and occasionally running out of room in the process; not excessively showy but unafraid of demonstrating". Unterberger further commented on Carey's exposure to the wider pop landscape following her debut at the award show, commenting on how "Mariah's self-titled debut LP shot to the top of the Billboard 200 and stayed there for 11 weeks" in the wake of her appearance.

The singer's outspokenness about her own multi-racial heritage at the time of her debut's release has also been commented upon by both music critics and sociologists alike. As noted by Professor Michael Eric Dyson in his book, Between God and Gangsta Rap: Bearing Witness to Black Culture, Carey's "refusal to bow to public pressure" surrounding the nature of her ethnicity exposed "the messy, sometimes arbitrary, politics of definition and categorisation" and "the racial contradictions at the centre of contemporary pop music" at the time. Sika Dagbovie-Mullins of Florida Atlantic University further credited Carey for breaking down existent racial barriers between pop and R&B, hailing her being a "multiracial heroine" for generations of mixed-race singers and songwriters.

== Track listing ==
All music is composed by Mariah Carey and Ben Margulies, except where noted.

Standard edition
No.	Title	Writer(s)	Producer(s)	Length
1.	"Vision of Love"		Rhett Lawrence; Narada Michael Walden^{[a]}	3:29
2.	"There's Got to Be a Way"	Carey; Ric Wake	Walden; Wake	4:53
3.	"I Don't Wanna Cry"	Carey; Walden	Walden	4:48
4.	"Someday"		Wake	4:06
5.	"Vanishing"		Carey	4:12
6.	"All in Your Mind"		Margulies; Wake	4:44
7.	"Alone in Love"		Lawrence	4:12
8.	"You Need Me"	Carey; Lawrence	Lawrence	3:51
9.	"Sent from Up Above"	Carey; Lawrence	Lawrence	4:05
10.	"Prisoner"		Wake	4:24
11.	"Love Takes Time"		Walter Afanasieff	3:49
Total length:				46:44

Notes

- ^{^[a]} signifies an additional producer
- ^{^[b]} Credits adapted from the album's liner notes.
- The original pressings of Mariah Carey either do not list "Love Takes Time" on the back cover while it is included, mistakenly list it as included on the promotional messaging when it is not included, or do not include the song at all, with no mentioning of its exclusion. This is due to the track being considered for the album, with the mastering and finalization process beginning for the song, only after album pressings had started worldwide.

== Personnel ==
- Mariah Carey – vocals, background vocals, arranger, vocal arrangements
- Ben Margulies – drums, keyboards, programming, arranger
- Narada Michael Walden – drums, arranger, additional production, rhythm arrangement
- Ren Klyce – Linn drums, Fairlight programming
- Joe Franco – drums, percussion, drum programming
- Ric Wake – drum programming, additional arrangement
- Omar Hakim – drums
- Jimmy Rip – guitars
- Chris Camozzi – acoustic guitar, electric guitar
- David Williams – guitars
- Michael Landau – guitars
- Vernon Reid – guitars
- Nile Rodgers – guitar on "You Need Me"
- Rhett Lawrence – keyboards, recording, mixing, arranger
- Louis Biancaniello – keyboards, bass, programming, rhythm programming
- Richard Tee – piano on "Vanishing"
- Marcus Miller – Fretless bass
- Walter Afanasieff – synth horns, keyboards, synthesizers, synth bass, arranger
- Billy T. Scott – background vocals
- The Billy T. Scott Ensemble – background vocals
- Fonzie Thornton – background vocals
- Chris Toland – arranger, additional engineering
- Rich Tancredi – additional arrangement, additional keyboards
- Patrick Dillett – engineer, recording, mixing
- Bob Cadway – engineer, recording, mixing
- Dana Jon Chappelle – engineer, mixing, additional engineering
- Manny LaCarrubba – additional engineering
- Larry Alexander – mixing
- Bob Ludwig – mastering, (at Masterdisk)
- Howie Weinburg – mastering (at Masterdisk)
- Tommy Mottola – executive producer

== Charts ==
=== Weekly charts ===
Weekly chart performance for Mariah Carey
Chart (1990–1991)	Peak position
Australian Albums (ARIA)	6
Canada Top Albums/CDs (RPM)	1
Canadian Albums (The Record)	1
Dutch Albums (Album Top 100)	6
European Top 100 Albums (Music & Media)	12
Finnish Albums (Suomen virallinen lista)	13
German Albums (Offizielle Top 100)	24
Hungarian Albums (MAHASZ)	35
Italian Albums (Musica e dischi)	24
Japanese Albums (Oricon)	13
New Zealand Albums (RMNZ)	4
Norwegian Albums (VG-lista)	4
Spanish Albums (PROMUSICAE)	35
Swedish Albums (Sverigetopplistan)	8
Swiss Albums (Schweizer Hitparade)	15
UK Albums (Official Charts)	6
UK Albums (MRIB)	5
UK Dance Albums (Music Week)	2
US Top Pop Albums (Billboard)	1
US Top Black Albums (Billboard)	3
US Top 200 Albums (Cash Box)	1
US R&B Albums (Cash Box)	2

Weekly chart performance for Mariah Carey (catalog)
Chart (1994–2022)	Peak position
Dutch Albums (Album Top 100)	53
South Korean International Albums (Circle)	77
Swedish Albums (Sverigetopplistan)	43
Scottish Albums (Official Charts)	46
UK Albums (Official Charts)	45
UK R&B Albums (Official Charts)	3
US Top Catalog Albums (Billboard)	30
US Vinyl Albums (Billboard)	21

=== Year-end charts ===
Year-end chart performance for Mariah Carey
Chart (1990)	Position
Australian Albums (ARIA)	53
Canada Top Albums/CDs (RPM)	13
Dutch Albums (MegaCharts)	40
European Top 100 Albums (Music & Media)	79
Japanese Albums (Oricon)	87
New Zealand (RMNZ)	28
Norwegian Summer Period Albums (VG-lista)	5
Swedish Albums (Sverigetopplistan)	26
US Billboard 200	32
US Top R&B/Hip-Hop Albums (Billboard)	30

Chart (1991)	Position
Australian Albums (ARIA)	6
Canada Top Albums/CDs (RPM)	4
Dutch Albums (MegaCharts)	88
New Zealand (RMNZ)	12
US Billboard 200	1
US Top R&B/Hip-Hop Albums (Billboard)	6

=== Decade-end charts ===
Decade-end chart performance for Mariah Carey
Chart (1990–1999)	Position
US Billboard 200	27

=== All-time charts ===
All-time chart performance for Mariah Carey
Chart	Position
US Billboard 200	50
US Billboard 200 (Women)	18

== Certifications ==
Certifications and sales for Mariah Carey
Region	Certification	Certified units/sales
Australia (ARIA)	5× Platinum	350,000^{‡}
Canada (Music Canada)	7× Platinum	700,000^{^}
Japan (RIAJ)	3× Platinum	600,000^{^}
Netherlands (NVPI)	Platinum	100,000^{^}
New Zealand (RMNZ)	Platinum	15,000^{^}
Spain (Promusicae)	Gold	50,000^{^}
Sweden (GLF)	Platinum	100,000^{^}
Switzerland (IFPI Switzerland)	Gold	25,000^{^}
United Kingdom (BPI)	Platinum	300,000^{^}
United States (RIAA)	9× Platinum	9,000,000^{^}
Summaries
Worldwide	—	15,000,000
^{^} Shipments figures based on certification alone.^{‡} Sales+streaming figures based on certification alone.

== Release history ==
Release dates and formats for Mariah Carey
Region	Date	Format(s)	Label(s)	Ref.
United States	June 12, 1990	LP; cassette; CD	Columbia	
Canada	June 28, 1990	CD	Columbia	
Japan	August 22, 1990	CD	CBS/Sony Records	
United Kingdom	September 3, 1990	LP; cassette; CD	CBS	

== See also ==
- List of Billboard 200 number-one albums of 1991
- List of best-selling albums by women
- List of Billboard Year-End number-one albums and singles
