= Ben Margulies =

American songwriter, musician, and producer

Ben Margulies is an American songwriter and record producer as well as a drummer, guitarist, pianist, and singer. He is best known for co-writing seven of the eleven songs on Mariah Carey's self-titled debut album with her, including the number-one hits "Vision of Love", "Love Takes Time", and "Someday". The album was nominated for multiple Grammys and has sold over twenty million records worldwide. "Love Takes Time" also won Song of the Year at the 1992 BMI Pop Awards.

== Career ==
At the age of seventeen, Margulies moved to New York City and was hired to play drums for the Comateens' European tour supporting their album Pictures on a String.

Margulies is a prolific songwriter/producer. He has written and/or worked with artists and writers across all genres, including Lisa Lavie, Chaka Khan, Kenny Loggins, Mac Davis, Paul Overstreet, Steve Cropper, Dennis Morgan, Billy Burnette, Jeffrey Steele, Dallas Davidson, Lari White, Oliver Leiber, David Tolliver, Chad Warrix, Kristen Kelly, Shawn Camp (musician), Dallas Austin, Bekka Bramlett, Marti Frederiksen, Danny Myrick, Delta Goodrem, The Smeezingtons (Bruno Mars), Jack Tempchin, Cristy Lee Cook, John Edwards, Troy Olsen, Nash Overstreet, Chris Gelbuda, and Jacob Durrett. He has also written and produced songs for film and had his songs featured on television shows.

Margulies owns a recording studio, Secret Garden Recording Studios, in Santa Barbara, California, where he works with writers and artists from all over the world. The Chris Pelonis-designed room was featured as one of Mix magazine's "Class of 2001 Studios". In 2014, Katy Perry, working with producers Dr. Luke and Max Martin, recorded much of her chart-topping album Prism at Secret Garden, including the hits "Dark Horse" and "Roar".

== Mariah Carey/Ben Margulies co-written songs ==
- "Vision of Love"
- "Love Takes Time"
- "Someday"
- "Vanishing"
- "All in Your Mind"
- "Alone in Love"
- "Prisoner"
- "Here We Go Around Again"
