= Someday (Mariah Carey song) =

1990 single by Mariah Carey

Single by Mariah Carey

from the album Mariah Carey
- B-side: "Alone in Love"
- Released: November 28, 1990
- Recorded: 1988
- Studio: Power Station, New York City
- Genre: Dance; dance-pop; new jack swing; R&B; soul
- Length: 4:06 (album version); 4:19 (7” Straight); 4:30 (video version)
- Label: Columbia
- Composers: Mariah Carey; Ben Margulies
- Lyricist: Mariah Carey
- Producer: Ric Wake

Mariah Carey singles chronology
"Love Takes Time" (1990)	"Someday" (1990)	"I Don't Wanna Cry" (1991)

Music video
- "Someday" on YouTube

"Someday" is a song by American singer-songwriter Mariah Carey from her self-titled debut studio album (1990). It is a dance-pop, new jack swing and R&B song. Prior to Carey signing a record contract, she and producer Ben Margulies had written and produced a four-track demo which included "Someday". After signing a contract with Columbia Records, Carey began work on her debut album and she reached out to Ric Wake to ask if he would produce the song, to which he agreed. The composition of the demo recording was changed during the recording process, most notably replacing the horns with a guitar, which Carey disapproved of.

"Someday" was released as the album's third single on November 28, 1990. The song was a critical and commercial success, being described as an album highlight and becoming Carey's third consecutive number-one single on the US Billboard Hot 100. "Someday" was subsequently included on many of Carey's compilation albums and greatest hits releases, including #1's (1998), Greatest Hits (2001), The Essential Mariah Carey (2011) and #1 to Infinity (2015). It was certified Gold by the RIAA.

== Background ==
In 1988, a 19-year-old Mariah Carey moved out from her mother's house in Long Island and into an apartment in Manhattan. She had composed a four-track demo tape with her writing partner Ben Margulies while she was attending high school. As 1988 progressed, Carey struggled to impress record executives with the tape and had failed in securing a record deal. She worked several jobs, including as a waitress and coat-checker, in order to pay for studio sessions with Margulies to make changes to the demo. After several months, Carey befriended singer Brenda K. Starr, and soon became one of her back-up vocalists. During recording sessions and rehearsals, Starr began to notice "glimpses" of Carey's "gifted" vocals. She thought that Carey was capable of achieving mainstream success and that she needed some guidance to break into the industry.

One evening, Starr took Carey to a record industry gala with hope of convincing a record executive to listen to Carey's demo. Jerry L. Greenberg, the president of Atlantic Records, was interested in Carey; as she handed him the tape, Columbia Records executive Tommy Mottola grabbed it from him, and said that he would tend to "the project". Mottola left the event later that evening, and got into his limousine and listened to the tape. He quickly realized that he had found a talented vocalist, turned the car around and returned to the party to find Carey, but she had already left. After a week of tracking her down through Starr's management, Mottola got in touch with Carey and invited her to go to Columbia Records. After meeting with Carey and her mother Patricia for the first time, Mottola said, "When I heard and saw Mariah, there was absolutely no doubt that she was in every way destined for super-stardom." After a few brief meetings, Carey was signed to Columbia in December 1988.

== Recording ==
Prior to Carey signing her record deal with Columbia, she and Margulies had written and produced fourteen songs over a three-year period, seven of which made the final track listing of her self-titled debut studio album (1990), including "Someday". "Someday" was one of the four songs which were on the demo tape handed to Mottola prior to her signing the contract. Carey explained the process behind the song's conception, saying that Margulies would play different notes on an electric keyboard with Carey directing him on chord changes, and provided the lyrics, chorus and melody. Producer Ric Wake later recalled that "Someday" was his favorite song from the beginning of recording sessions for the album, saying "I loved that song right from the beginning...Then Mariah called me one day and said 'I'd love to do it if you want to do it.' It was great, I'm glad she called me."

"Someday" was recorded and mixed by Bob Cadway at The Power Station in New York City. In addition to be written by Carey and Margulies, they also arranged the song with Chris Toland. In addition to producing the track, Wake also carried out additional arrangement with Rich Tancredi. The drum programming was performed by Wake and Joe Franco, while Cadway played the guitars and Tancredi the keyboards. Carey performed all of her own background vocals. Carey later revealed that "Someday" was one of her favorite songs on the demo and that she would "listen to it over and over again on the subway after the studio sessions". However, Carey later expressed her disapproval of some of the new elements added during the production of Mariah Carey, such as the replacement of the horns on the demo in favor of an electric guitar.

== Composition ==
"Someday"
A 20-second sample of the song’s outro, featuring Carey's upbeat vocals and transition to the whistle register.

The fourth song on the track list of Mariah Carey, "Someday" is the album's first up-tempo track. It is a dance-pop, new jack swing and R&B song, which lasts for a duration of four minutes, six seconds. "Someday" is set in common time and in the key of E major. Lyrically, it is about how Carey is "gleefully" waiting for bad karma to come to her ex-boyfriend who "dumped" her, which can be heard in the lyrics "Cause I know you'll soon discover / you're needing me in spite of all the others."

Record Mirror critic Gary Crossing thought Carey's vocals sounded like those of American singer Madonna on the latter's 1989 song "Like a Prayer".

== Critical reception ==
Professional ratings
Review scores
Source	Rating
Entertainment Weekly	B
Stereogum	8/10

AllMusic writer Ashley S. Battel said it is "energetic". Pan-European magazine Music & Media described the song as "upbeat dance pop with a prominent role for Carey's joyous and confident vocals." To mark twenty-five years since the release of Mariah Carey in June 1990, Billboard writer Trevor Anderson wrote a track-by-track review of the album in June 2015. He noted that, being the fourth track on the track listing, it is the album's first up-tempo song and that is "beats new life" into it as a result. However, he felt that some of the rhythmic arrangements and the electric guitar solo during the bridge prevented "Someday" from sounding timeless. Another editor, Larry Flick commented, "One of the front-running pop divas of the '90s picks up the pace with this contagious, new jack-inflected popper that has already proven irresistible at pop radio." Record Mirror critic Robin Smith wrote: "It's all very nice and very pretty, but Mariah still sounds like a Bobby Davro impression of Whitney Houston."

== Release and remixes ==
Included on the maxi single are the 'New 7" Jackswing,' the 'New 7" Straight', the 'New 12" Jackswing' and the 'Pianopercapella – New' mix, all of which were produced by Shep Pettibone, while "Alone in Love" was included as the B-side. "Alone in Love" was also written by Carey and Margulies, and produced by Rhett Lawrence. "Someday" has been included on many of Carey's compilation albums and greatest hits releases, including #1's (1998), Greatest Hits (2001), The Essential Mariah Carey (2011), and #1 to Infinity (2015).

The English electronic group Rezonance Q released a remix which peaked at number 29 on the UK Singles Chart in early 2003.

On July 24, 2020, along with the celebration of the 30th-anniversary of her album Mariah Carey, she released the song as an extended play, titled Someday EP, which contains the remixes from the US maxi single, as well as previously unreleased remixes, including the 'House Dub Version', the 'New Jack Dub Version' and the 'New Jack Bonus Beats'.

=== MTV Unplugged version ===
"Someday (Live at MTV Unplugged)"
A sample of the live performance recorded at the Kaufman Astoria Studios, featuring lighter instrumental accompaniment.

Despite having released two highly successful albums, Mariah Carey and Emotions (1991), the singer had yet to embark on world tour because of stage-fright and the possible negative effects of singing vocally strenuous songs every night. Many critics were unconvinced with her reasoning, and accused her of manipulating her vocals in the studio. In response, Carey appeared on MTV Unplugged to perform a small selection of her songs live in 1992. For her rendition of "Someday", she altered the arrangement and stripped it back to give it a rawer sound. This version was produced by Carey and Afanasieff and recorded live at the Kaufman Astoria Studios in New York City on March 16, 1992. In the liner notes of #1 to Infinity, Carey expressed her dislike toward the original studio version on Mariah Carey and stated that she wished she could "delete some of the overproduction," which is why she decided to include the MTV Unplugged version on the compilation instead. Another arrangement of the song was also included on the set-list of Carey's Las Vegas residency show, #1 to Infinity (2015–17).

== Chart performance ==
In the United States, "Someday" became Carey's third consecutive number-one single on the Billboard Hot 100 following "Vision of Love" and "Love Takes Time". "Someday" became her first song to top the Dance Club Songs chart on March 16, 1991, and her second chart topper on the Radio Songs chart. The track peaked at number three on the Hot R&B/Hip-Hop Songs chart and number five on the Adult Contemporary chart. After three months of release, the Recording Industry Association of America (RIAA) certified the song gold, denoting shipments of more than 500,000 copies. In 2015, Billboard writer Gary Trust compiled a list of Carey's twenty-five best performing songs based on their weekly performance; "Someday" ranks as the singer's eighth best performing track of her career on the Hot 100. Trust also noted that Carey "proved her way" by releasing a club song which reached number-one following two chart-topping ballads. In Canada, "Someday" reached at number five on the main chart, but peaked at number one on both the Top Singles and Adult Contemporary charts. It also reached a peak of number four on the Dance chart. Outside of North America, "Someday" reached the top-five in Iceland, the top-fifteen in New Zealand, the top-forty in France and the United Kingdom, and the top-fifty in Australian and Belgium.

== Music video ==
The accompanying music video for "Someday" begins with Carey, revisiting her youth, wandering a high school corridor and standing inside a classroom of schoolchildren playing various musical instruments with inter-cutting clips of men playing on drums. Clips of a schoolgirl playing Carey are also shown, with Carey shadowing her movements, and her efforts to catch a schoolboy's attention who in turn persistently ignores her, choosing to mess about in the classroom and corridors with his friends instead. Towards the end of the video, groups of schoolchildren are shown dancing in the corridor as the boy she liked, now an adult, is following Carey around the school and trying to flirt with her, but Carey brushes him off.

The extended version of the video was included on The First Vision 1991 VHS and its subsequent DVD reissue, in which Carey stated that she loved watching the kids dancing and getting to interact with them and that she had fun during the video shoot.

In 2015, to coincide with the release of #1 to Infinity Carey released videos of herself talking about the videos to songs on the compilation. For "Someday", Carey stated that she "hates" the video, mainly because of the "tomfoolery" scenes of the kids. She said that she would have kept only the closeups and that the girl playing the younger version of herself was cute.

== Formats and track listings ==
- 12-inch vinyl and cassette single
1. "Someday" (New 12" House) – 6:50
2. "Someday" (Pianoapercaloopapella) – 4:14
3. "Someday" (New 12" Jackswing) – 6:55
4. "Someday" (New 7" Straight) – 4:16
5. "Alone in Love" – 4:11
- 7-inch vinyl and cassette singles
1. "Someday" (7" Jackswing Mix) – 4:40
2. "Alone in Love" – 4:11
- Worldwide 12-inch vinyl, maxi-CD, CD3 and cassette singles
1. "Someday" (New 12" House) – 6:50
2. "Someday" (New 12" Jackswing) – 6:56
3. "Someday" (Pianoapercaloopapella) – 4:14
- European 7-inch, CD and cassette singles
1. "Someday" (New 7" Straight) – 4:16
2. "Someday" (New 7" Jackswing) – 4:40
- Maxi-CD single
1. "Someday" (New 7" Jackswing) – 4:40
2. "Someday" (New 7" Straight) – 4:16
3. "Someday" (New 12" Jackswing) – 6:55
4. "Someday" (Pianoapercapella – New) – 4:17
5. "Alone in Love" – 4:11
- UK CD single
1. "Someday" (7" Jackswing Mix) – 4:40
2. "Someday" (12" Jackswing Mix) – 6:55
3. "Someday" (12" House Mix) – 6:50
- UK limited edition picture disc CD single
1. "Someday" – 4:40
2. "Vision of Love" – 3:28
3. "Love Takes Time" – 3:48
4. "Alone in Love" – 4:11
- Someday EP
1. "Someday" (New 7" Straight) – 4:18
2. "Someday" (7" Jack Swing Mix) – 4:41
3. "Someday" (New 12" House) – 6:52
4. "Someday" (New 12" Jackswing) – 6:58
5. "Someday" (Pianoapercaloopapella) – 4:15
6. "Someday" (House Dub Version) – 5:11
7. "Someday" (New Jack Dub Version) – 4:23
8. "Someday" (New Jack Bonus Beats) – 4:31

== Credits and personnel ==
=== A-side: "Someday" ===
Recording

- Recorded at The Power Station, New York City
- Mixed at The Power Station, New York City

Vocals

- All by Carey

Personnel

- Songwriting – Mariah Carey, Ben Margulies
- Production – Ric Wake
- Arrangement – Mariah Carey, Ben Marguilles, Chris Toland
- Additional arrangement – Ric Wake, Rich Tancredi
- Mixing – Bob Cadway
- Drum programming – Ric Wake, Joe Franco
- Guitar – Bob Cadway
- Keyboards – Joe Franco

=== B-side: "Alone in Love" ===
Recording

- Recorded at Skyline Studios, New York City; The Hit Factory, New York City; Oakshire Recorders, Los Angeles
- Mixed at Skyline Studios, New York City

Vocals

- Lead vocals – Mariah Carey
- Background vocals – Mariah Carey

Personnel

- Songwriting – Mariah Carey, Ben Margulies
- Production – Rhett Lawrence
- Arrangement – Mariah Carey, Ben Marguilles, Chris Toland
- Mixing and recording – Patrick Dillett, Rhett Lawrence
- Guitar – Michael Landau, David Williams
- Keyboards – Rhett Lawrence

Credits adapted from the liner notes of Mariah Carey. "Someday" remixes and alternate versions co-produced by Shep Pettibone with Ric Wake.

== Charts and certifications ==
Weekly chart performance
Chart (1991)	Peak position
Australia (ARIA)	44
Austria Airplay (Ö3 Austria)	6
Belgium (Ultratop 50 Flanders)	44
Canada Top Singles (RPM)	1
Canada Adult Contemporary (RPM)	1
Canada Dance (RPM)	4
Canada Retail Singles (The Record)	5
Canada Contemporary Hit Radio (The Record)	1
Europe (Eurochart Hot 100)	75
Europe (European Hit Radio)	6
Finland (Suomen virallinen lista)	14
France (SNEP)	38
Iceland (Íslenski Listinn Topp 10)	3
Israel (IBA)	2
Italy Airplay (Musica e dischi)	12
Japan Albums (Oricon) Maxi CD	48
Netherlands (Dutch Top 40)	29
Netherlands (Single Top 100)	21
New Zealand (Recorded Music NZ)	14
UK Singles (Official Charts)	38
UK Dance (CIN)	23
UK Singles (MRIB)	35
UK Club (Record Mirror) 12" Jackswing Mix/12" House Mix	26
UK Airplay (Spotlight Research)	19
US Hot 100 Singles (Billboard)	1
US Hot Adult Contemporary (Billboard)	5
US Hot Dance Music – Club Play (Billboard)	1
US Hot Dance Music – 12-inch Singles Sales (Billboard)	7
US Hot R&B Singles (Billboard)	3
US Top 40 Radio Monitor (Billboard)	1
US Cash Box Top 100	1
US Top R&B Singles (Cash Box)	3
US Adult Contemporary (Gavin Report)	7
US Top 40 (Gavin Report)	1
US Urban Contemporary (Gavin Report)	3
US Adult Contemporary (Radio & Records)	4
US Contemporary Hit Radio (Radio & Records)	1
US Urban Contemporary (Radio & Records)	2

Year-end chart performance
Chart (1991)	Position
Canada Top Singles (RPM)	7
Canada Adult Contemporary (RPM)	20
Canada Dance (RPM)	20
Canada Retail Singles (The Record)	31
Europe (European Hit Radio)	62
US Billboard Hot 100	13
US Adult Contemporary (Billboard)	36
US Dance Club Songs (Billboard)	26
US Hot R&B/Hip-Hop Songs (Billboard)	61
US Cash Box Top 100	11
US R&B Singles (Cash Box)	18
US Adult Contemporary (Gavin Report)	48
US Top 40 (Gavin Report)	3
US Urban Contemporary (Gavin Report)	26
US Adult Contemporary (Radio & Records)	32
US Contemporary Hit Radio (Radio & Records)	4
US Urban (Radio & Records)	32

Certifications and sales
Region	Certification	Certified units/sales
United States (RIAA)	Gold	500,000^{^}
^{^} Shipments figures based on certification alone.

== Release history ==
Release dates and formats for "Someday"
Region	Date	Format(s)	Label(s)	Ref.
United States	November 28, 1990	7-inch vinyl; 12-inch vinyl; cassette; maxi cassette; CD	Columbia	
United Kingdom	December 31, 1990	7-inch vinyl; 12-inch vinyl; cassette; CD	CBS	
Japan	January 21, 1991	Mini CD	Sony Music Japan	
Australia	February 18, 1991	7-inch vinyl; 12-inch vinyl; cassette; CD	CBS	
Japan	February 21, 1991	Maxi CD	Sony Music Japan	
Various	July 24, 2020	Digital download; streaming (EP)	Legacy	

== See also ==
- List of Billboard Hot 100 number-one singles of 1991
- List of number-one dance singles of 1991 (U.S.)
- Artists with the most number-ones on the U.S. Dance Club Songs chart
