= List of Billboard Hot 100 top-ten singles in 1991 =

This is a list of singles that have peaked in the Top 10 of the Billboard Hot 100 during 1991.

A total of 111 singles reached the top ten in 1991, with 102 singles that peaked that year while the remaining nine peaked in 1990 or 1992. This was also the final year that the Billboard Hot 100 used the old methodology for determining sales and airplay figures from a survey of retailers and radio stations. Beginning with the chart dated November 30, 1991, sales data was now gathered by Soundscan via a collection of the number of barcode scans a record received while airplay was to be compiled by Broadcast Data Systems, which continuously monitored what songs were being played on radio.

27 songs reached number one that year, while 10 songs reached a peak of number two.

Mariah Carey scored four top ten hits during the year with "Someday", "I Don't Wanna Cry", "Emotions", and "Can't Let Go", the most among all other artists.

== Top-ten singles ==
- (#) – 1991 Year-end top 10 single position and rank

List of Billboard Hot 100 top ten singles which peaked in 1991
Top ten entry date	Single	Artist(s)	Peak	Peak date	Weeks in top ten
Singles from 1990
December 8	"Justify My Love"	Madonna	1	January 5	8
December 15	"High Enough"	Damn Yankees	3	January 12	8
December 22	"Sensitivity"	Ralph Tresvant	4	January 26	8
Singles from 1991
January 5	"Love Will Never Do (Without You)"	Janet Jackson	1	January 19	7
January 5	"The First Time" (#9)	Surface	1	January 26	8
January 12	"Gonna Make You Sweat (Everybody Dance Now)" (#3)	C+C Music Factory featuring Freedom Williams	1	February 9	9
January 19	"Play That Funky Music"	Vanilla Ice	4	February 9	5
January 19	"After the Rain"	Nelson	6	February 2	4
January 26	"I'm Not in Love"	Will to Power	7	February 2	3
January 26	"Just Another Dream"	Cathy Dennis	9	February 2	2
February 2	"All the Man That I Need"	Whitney Houston	1	February 23	7
February 9	"One More Try" (#5)	Timmy T	1	March 23	9
February 9	"I'll Give All My Love to You"	Keith Sweat	7	February 16	3
February 16	"Someday"	Mariah Carey	1	March 9	7
February 16	"Where Does My Heart Beat Now"	Celine Dion	4	March 2	5
February 16	"Disappear"	INXS	8	February 16	2
February 23	"Wicked Game"	Chris Isaak	6	March 2	3
February 23	"I Saw Red"	Warrant	10	February 23	1
March 2	"Show Me the Way"	Styx	3	March 16	3
March 2	"All This Time"	Sting	5	March 16	3
March 2	"Around the Way Girl"	LL Cool J	9	March 2	1
March 2	"Coming Out of the Dark"	Gloria Estefan	1	March 30	7
March 9	"This House"	Tracie Spencer	3	March 30	5
March 16	"Get Here"	Oleta Adams	5	March 23	3
March 16	"Hold You Tight"	Tara Kemp	3	April 13	7
March 23	"You're in Love"	Wilson Phillips	1	April 20	7
March 23	"I've Been Thinking About You"	Londonbeat	1	April 13	6
March 23	"Rescue Me"	Madonna	9	March 23	1
March 23	"Sadeness (Part I)"	Enigma	5	April 6	5
March 30	"Signs"	Tesla	8	April 6	3
April 6	"Baby Baby" (#10)	Amy Grant	1	April 27	7
April 6	"Iesha"	Another Bad Creation	9	April 13	2
April 13	"Joyride"	Roxette	1	May 11	6
April 13	"Rico Suave"	Gerardo	7	April 13	2
April 20	"I Like the Way (The Kissing Game)" (#8)	Hi-Five	1	May 18	9
April 20	"Cry for Help"	Rick Astley	7	April 27	4
April 20	"Here We Go (Let's Rock & Roll)"	C+C Music Factory	3	May 18	6
April 27	"Touch Me (All Night Long)"	Cathy Dennis	2	May 18	6
April 27	"I Touch Myself"	Divinyls	4	May 18	5
May 4	"Rhythm of My Heart"	Rod Stewart	5	May 18	5
May 4	"I Don't Wanna Cry"	Mariah Carey	1	May 25	8
May 11	"More Than Words" (#7)	Extreme	1	June 8	9
May 18	"I Wanna Sex You Up" (#2)	Color Me Badd	2	June 8	10
May 25	"Love Is a Wonderful Thing"	Michael Bolton	4	June 1	6
May 25	"Silent Lucidity"	Queensrÿche	9	June 1	2
June 1	"Rush Rush" (#4)	Paula Abdul	1	June 15	9
June 1	"Losing My Religion"	R.E.M.	4	June 22	6
June 8	"Unbelievable" (#6)	EMF	1	July 20	9
June 8	"Miracle"	Whitney Houston	9	June 8	1
June 8	"Power of Love/Love Power"	Luther Vandross	4	June 29	6
June 15	"Strike It Up"	Black Box	8	June 22	3
June 22	"Right Here, Right Now"	Jesus Jones	2	July 27	8
June 29	"Playground"	Another Bad Creation	10	June 29	1
July 6	"Place in this World"	Michael W. Smith	6	July 13	3
July 6	"Gypsy Woman (She's Homeless)"	Crystal Waters	8	July 6	2
July 6	"Here I Am (Come and Take Me)"	UB40	7	July 13	3
July 13	"Piece of My Heart"	Tara Kemp	7	July 20	3
July 13	"P.A.S.S.I.O.N."	Rythm Syndicate	2	August 3	6
July 20	"(Everything I Do) I Do It for You" (#1)	Bryan Adams	1	July 27	10
July 20	"Summertime"	DJ Jazzy Jeff & The Fresh Prince	4	August 3	6
July 27	"Every Heartbeat"	Amy Grant	2	August 17	6
July 27	"It Ain't Over 'til It's Over"	Lenny Kravitz	2	August 24	6
July 27	"Temptation"	Corina	6	August 10	5
August 3	"Fading Like a Flower (Every Time You Leave)"	Roxette	2	August 31	5
August 3	"I'll Be There"	The Escape Club	8	August 10	3
August 10	"Wind of Change"	Scorpions	4	August 31	5
August 17	"3 a.m. Eternal"	The KLF	5	September 7	5
August 24	"The Promise of a New Day"	Paula Abdul	1	September 14	5
August 24	"I Can't Wait Another Minute"	Hi-Five	8	August 31	3
August 31	"Motownphilly"	Boyz II Men	3	September 7	7
August 31	"Things That Make You Go Hmmm..."	C+C Music Factory	4	September 7	5
September 7	"I Adore Mi Amor"	Color Me Badd	1	September 21	7
September 7	"Crazy"	Seal	7	September 7	2
September 7	"Time, Love and Tenderness"	Michael Bolton	7	September 14	4
September 14	"Good Vibrations"	Marky Mark and the Funky Bunch featuring Loleatta Holloway	1	October 5	7
September 14	"Too Many Walls"	Cathy Dennis	8	September 21	2
September 21	"Love of a Lifetime"	FireHouse	5	September 28	4
September 21	"The Motown Song"	Rod Stewart featuring The Temptations	10	September 21	1
September 28	"Emotions"	Mariah Carey	1	October 12	7
September 28	"Do Anything"	Natural Selection	2	October 19	8
September 28	"Something to Talk About"	Bonnie Raitt	5	October 19	5
September 28	"Shiny Happy People"	R.E.M.	10	September 28	2
October 5	"Romantic"	Karyn White	1	November 2	7
October 5	"Hole Hearted"	Extreme	4	October 19	5
October 12	"Everybody Plays the Fool"	Aaron Neville	8	October 19	2
October 19	"Can't Stop This Thing We Started"	Bryan Adams	2	November 16	7
October 19	"Love... Thy Will Be Done"	Martika	10	October 19	1
October 26	"Cream"	Prince and the New Power Generation	1	November 9	7
October 26	"Real Real Real"	Jesus Jones	4	November 9	3
October 26	"O.P.P."	Naughty by Nature	6	November 9	6
November 2	"Don't Want to Be a Fool"	Luther Vandross	9	November 2	1
November 2	"The One and Only"	Chesney Hawkes	10	November 2	1
November 9	"When a Man Loves a Woman"	Michael Bolton	1	November 23	9
November 9	"It's So Hard to Say Goodbye to Yesterday"	Boyz II Men	2	December 14	11
November 9	"Set the Night to Music"	Roberta Flack with Maxi Priest	6	November 16	3
November 16	"Set Adrift on Memory Bliss"	P.M. Dawn	1	November 30	8
November 16	"That's What Love Is For"	Amy Grant	7	November 23	4
November 16	"Don't Cry"	Guns N' Roses	10	November 16	2
November 23	"Blowing Kisses in the Wind"	Paula Abdul	6	November 30	7
November 23	"I Wonder Why"	Curtis Stigers	9	November 23	1
November 30	"Black or White"	Michael Jackson	1	December 7	10
December 14	"Wildside"	Marky Mark and the Funky Bunch	10	December 14	5

=== 1990 peaks ===
List of Billboard Hot 100 top ten singles in 1991 which peaked in 1990
Top ten entry date	Single	Artist(s)	Peak	Peak date	Weeks in top ten
November 17	"Because I Love You (The Postman Song)"	Stevie B	1	December 8	10
November 17	"From a Distance"	Bette Midler	2	December 15	10
November 17	"I'm Your Baby Tonight"	Whitney Houston	1	December 1	8
December 1	"Impulsive"	Wilson Phillips	4	December 22	7
December 8	"Tom's Diner"	DNA featuring Suzanne Vega	5	December 22	6

=== 1992 peaks ===
List of Billboard Hot 100 top ten singles in 1991 which peaked in 1992
Top ten entry date	Single	Artist(s)	Peak	Peak date	Weeks in top ten
November 30	"All 4 Love"	Color Me Badd	1	January 25	14
December 7	"Can't Let Go"	Mariah Carey	2	January 25	11
December 14	"Finally"	CeCe Peniston	5	January 18	10
December 21	"2 Legit 2 Quit"	MC Hammer	5	January 11	4

== See also ==
- 1991 in music
- List of Billboard Hot 100 number ones of 1991
- Billboard Year-End Hot 100 singles of 1991
