= Billboard Year-End Hot 100 singles of 1991 =

Ranking of recorded music

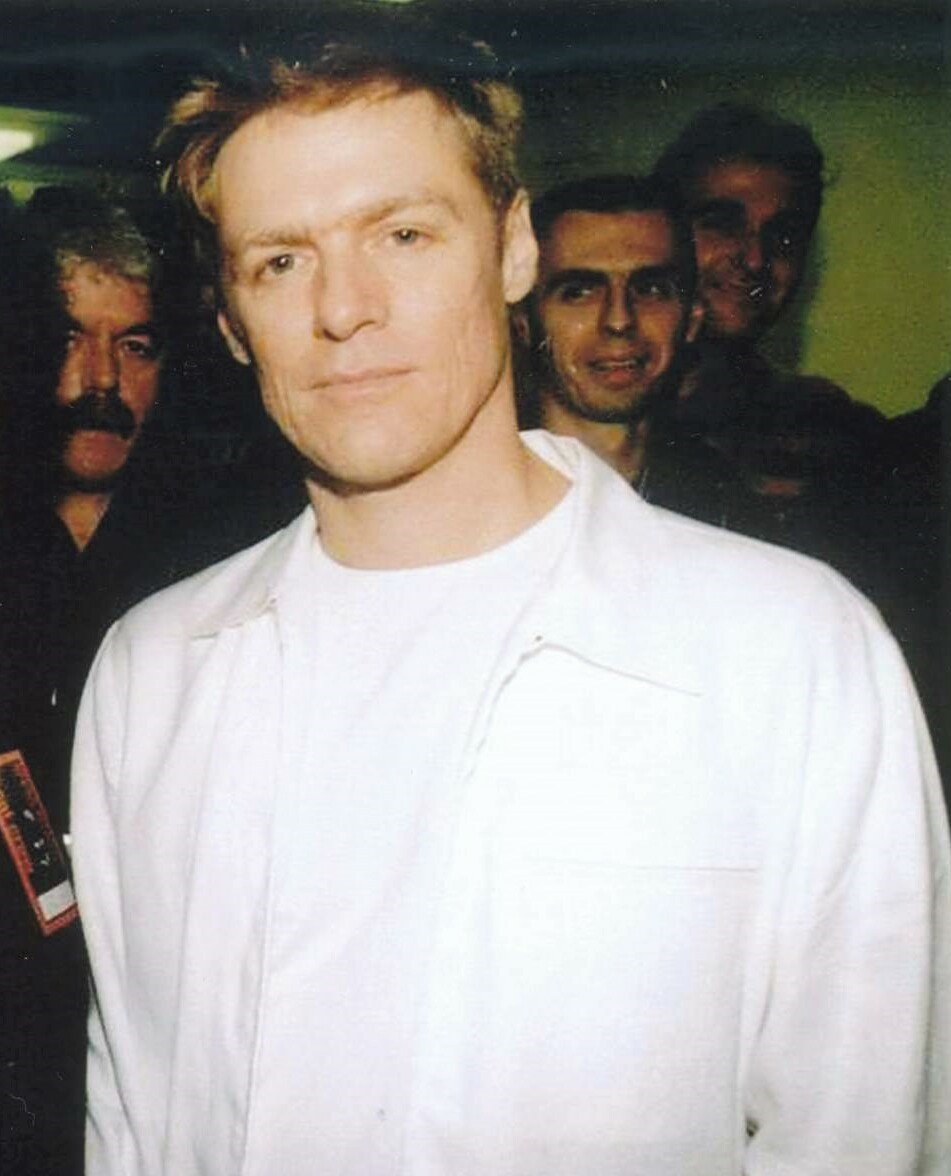
Bryan Adams (pictured) had two songs on the Year-End Hot 100, "(Everything I Do) I Do It for You" at number one and "Can't Stop This Thing We Started" at number 59.

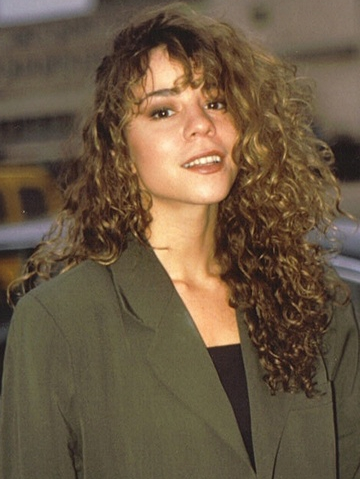
Mariah Carey (pictured) had four songs on the Year-End Hot 100, the most of any artist in 1991.

This is a list of Billboard magazine's Top Hot 100 songs of 1991.

No.	Title	Artist(s)
1	"(Everything I Do) I Do It for You"	Bryan Adams
2	"I Wanna Sex You Up"	Color Me Badd
3	"Gonna Make You Sweat (Everybody Dance Now)"	C+C Music Factory
4	"Rush Rush"	Paula Abdul
5	"One More Try"	Timmy T
6	"Unbelievable"	EMF
7	"More Than Words"	Extreme
8	"I Like the Way (The Kissing Game)"	Hi-Five
9	"The First Time"	Surface
10	"Baby Baby"	Amy Grant
11	"Motownphilly"	Boyz II Men
12	"Because I Love You (The Postman Song)"	Stevie B
13	"Someday"	Mariah Carey
14	"High Enough"	Damn Yankees
15	"From a Distance"	Bette Midler
16	"All the Man That I Need"	Whitney Houston
17	"Right Here, Right Now"	Jesus Jones
18	"I Adore Mi Amor"	Color Me Badd
19	"Love Will Never Do (Without You)"	Janet Jackson
20	"Good Vibrations"	Marky Mark and the Funky Bunch featuring Loleatta Holloway
21	"Justify My Love"	Madonna
22	"Emotions"	Mariah Carey
23	"Joyride"	Roxette
24	"Romantic"	Karyn White
25	"Hold You Tight"	Tara Kemp
26	"I Don't Wanna Cry"	Mariah Carey
27	"You're in Love"	Wilson Phillips
28	"Every Heartbeat"	Amy Grant
29	"Sensitivity"	Ralph Tresvant
30	"Touch Me (All Night Long)"	Cathy Dennis
31	"I've Been Thinking About You"	Londonbeat
32	"Do Anything"	Natural Selection
33	"Losing My Religion"	R.E.M.
34	"Coming Out of the Dark"	Gloria Estefan
35	"It Ain't Over 'til It's Over"	Lenny Kravitz
36	"Here We Go"	C+C Music Factory
37	"Where Does My Heart Beat Now"	Celine Dion
38	"Summertime"	DJ Jazzy Jeff & The Fresh Prince
39	"Wind of Change"	Scorpions
40	"P.A.S.S.I.O.N."	Rythm Syndicate
41	"The Promise of a New Day"	Paula Abdul
42	"I'm Your Baby Tonight"	Whitney Houston
43	"Love of a Lifetime"	FireHouse
44	"Fading Like a Flower (Every Time You Leave)"	Roxette
45	"This House"	Tracie Spencer
46	"Hole Hearted"	Extreme
47	"Power of Love/Love Power"	Luther Vandross
48	"Impulsive"	Wilson Phillips
49	"Love Is a Wonderful Thing"	Michael Bolton
50	"Rhythm of My Heart"	Rod Stewart
51	"Things That Make You Go Hmmm..."	C+C Music Factory
52	"I Touch Myself"	Divinyls
53	"Tom's Diner"	DNA featuring Suzanne Vega
54	"Iesha"	Another Bad Creation
55	"Something to Talk About"	Bonnie Raitt
56	"After the Rain"	Nelson
57	"Play That Funky Music"	Vanilla Ice
58	"Temptation"	Corina
59	"Can't Stop This Thing We Started"	Bryan Adams
60	"I Can't Wait Another Minute"	Hi-Five
61	"3 a.m. Eternal"	The KLF
62	"Time, Love and Tenderness"	Michael Bolton
63	"Sadeness (Part I)"	Enigma
64	"Around the Way Girl"	LL Cool J
65	"I'll Be There"	The Escape Club
66	"Cream"	Prince and The New Power Generation
67	"Now That We Found Love"	Heavy D & the Boyz
68	"Show Me the Way"	Styx
69	"Love Takes Time"	Mariah Carey
70	"Cry for Help"	Rick Astley
71	"The Way You Do the Things You Do"	UB40
72	"Here I Am (Come and Take Me)"	UB40
73	"Signs"	Tesla
74	"Too Many Walls"	Cathy Dennis
75	"Crazy"	Seal
76	"I'll Give All My Love to You"	Keith Sweat
77	"Place in this World"	Michael W. Smith
78	"Something to Believe In"	Poison
79	"Wicked Game"	Chris Isaak
80	"Get Here"	Oleta Adams
81	"Round and Round"	Tevin Campbell
82	"Silent Lucidity"	Queensrÿche
83	"I'm Not in Love"	Will to Power
84	"Piece of My Heart"	Tara Kemp
85	"Real Real Real"	Jesus Jones
86	"Everybody Plays the Fool"	Aaron Neville
87	"Just Another Dream"	Cathy Dennis
88	"Strike It Up"	Black Box
89	"Rico Suave"	Gerardo
90	"Disappear"	INXS
91	"Groove Is in the Heart"	Deee-Lite
92	"All This Time"	Sting
93	"The One and Only"	Chesney Hawkes
94	"O.P.P."	Naughty by Nature
95	"Freedom! '90"	George Michael
96	"I Saw Red"	Warrant
97	"Miles Away"	Winger
98	"Do You Want Me"	Salt-n-Pepa
99	"The Motown Song"	Rod Stewart
100	"Shiny Happy People"	R.E.M.

== See also ==
- 1991 in music
- List of Billboard Hot 100 number-one singles of 1991
- List of Billboard Hot 100 top-ten singles in 1991
- Billboard Year-End Hot Rap Singles of 1991
- Billboard Year-End Hot R&B Singles of 1991
