= List of Billboard Hot 100 number-one singles of the 1990s =

The Billboard Hot 100 is the main song chart of the American music industry and is updated every week by the Billboard magazine. During the 1990s the chart was based collectively on each single's weekly physical sales figures and airplay on American radio stations.

The methodology for determining sales and airplay figures drastically changed with the chart dated November 30, 1991. Instead of surveying retail stores and radio stations, sales data was now gathered by Soundscan via a collection of the number of barcode scans a record received while airplay was to be compiled by Broadcast Data Systems, which continuously monitored what songs were being played on radio. As the decade progressed, a growing trend in the music industry was to promote songs to radio without the release of a commercially available singles in an attempt by record companies to boost albums sales. Because such a release was required to chart on the Hot 100, many popular songs that were hits on top 40 radio never made it onto the chart. Beginning December 5, 1998, the Hot 100 changed from being a "singles" chart to a "songs" chart. Not only did Billboard start allowing airplay-only tracks to chart, it broadened its radio panel to include "R&B, adult R&B, mainstream rock, triple-A rock, and country outlets", which was formerly "confined to the mainstream top 40, rhythmic top 40, adult top 40, adult contemporary, and modern rock formats."

"Another Day in Paradise" by Phil Collins began the 1990s in the number-one position, spending the first two weeks of the decade on top, but its first week at number one was on the chart dated December 23, 1989. Santana's "Smooth" featuring Rob Thomas finished the decade and began the next with a 12-week run atop the Hot 100.

== Number ones ==
Key
♪ – Number-one single of the year

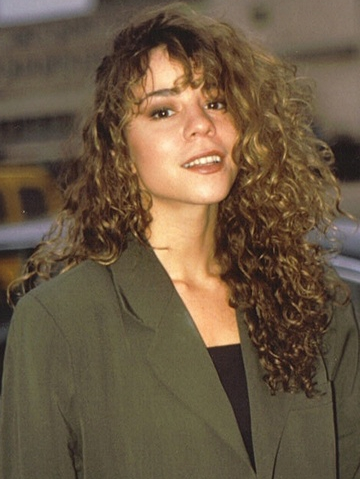
Mariah Carey amassed the most number-one hits (14 songs) and had the longest cumulative run atop the Billboard Hot 100 chart (60 weeks) during the 1990s. Carey is also the only artist to spend at least one week at the summit of the chart in each year of the decade.

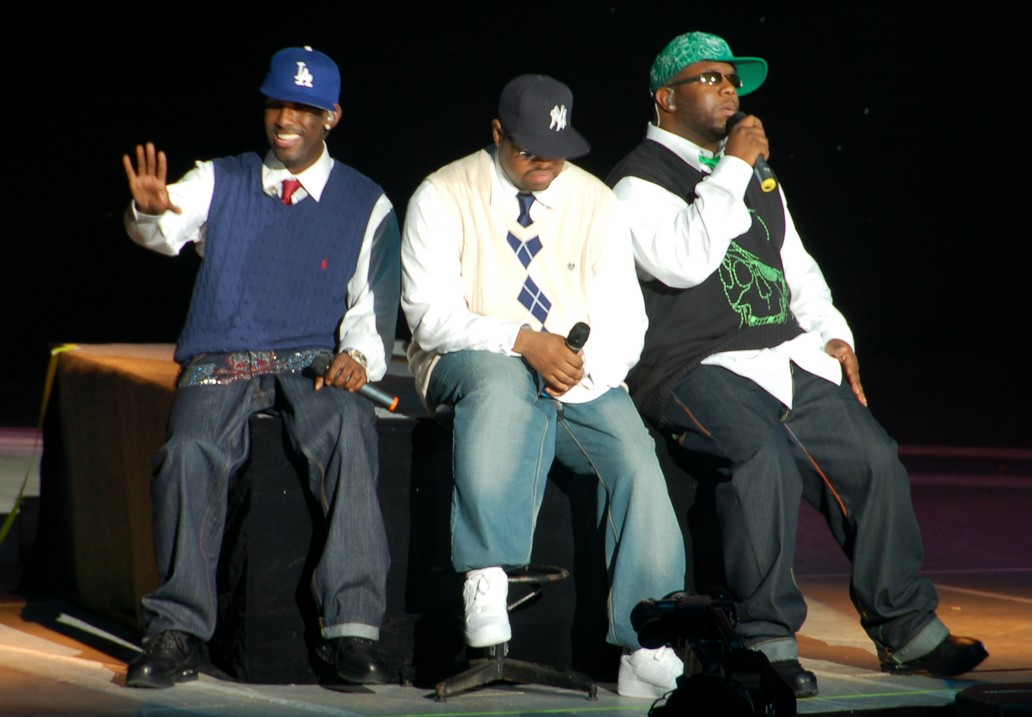
Boyz II Men remained at the top of the Billboard Hot 100 chart for 50 weeks during the 1990s. They scored five number-one songs, with three of them spending over 10 weeks atop the chart.

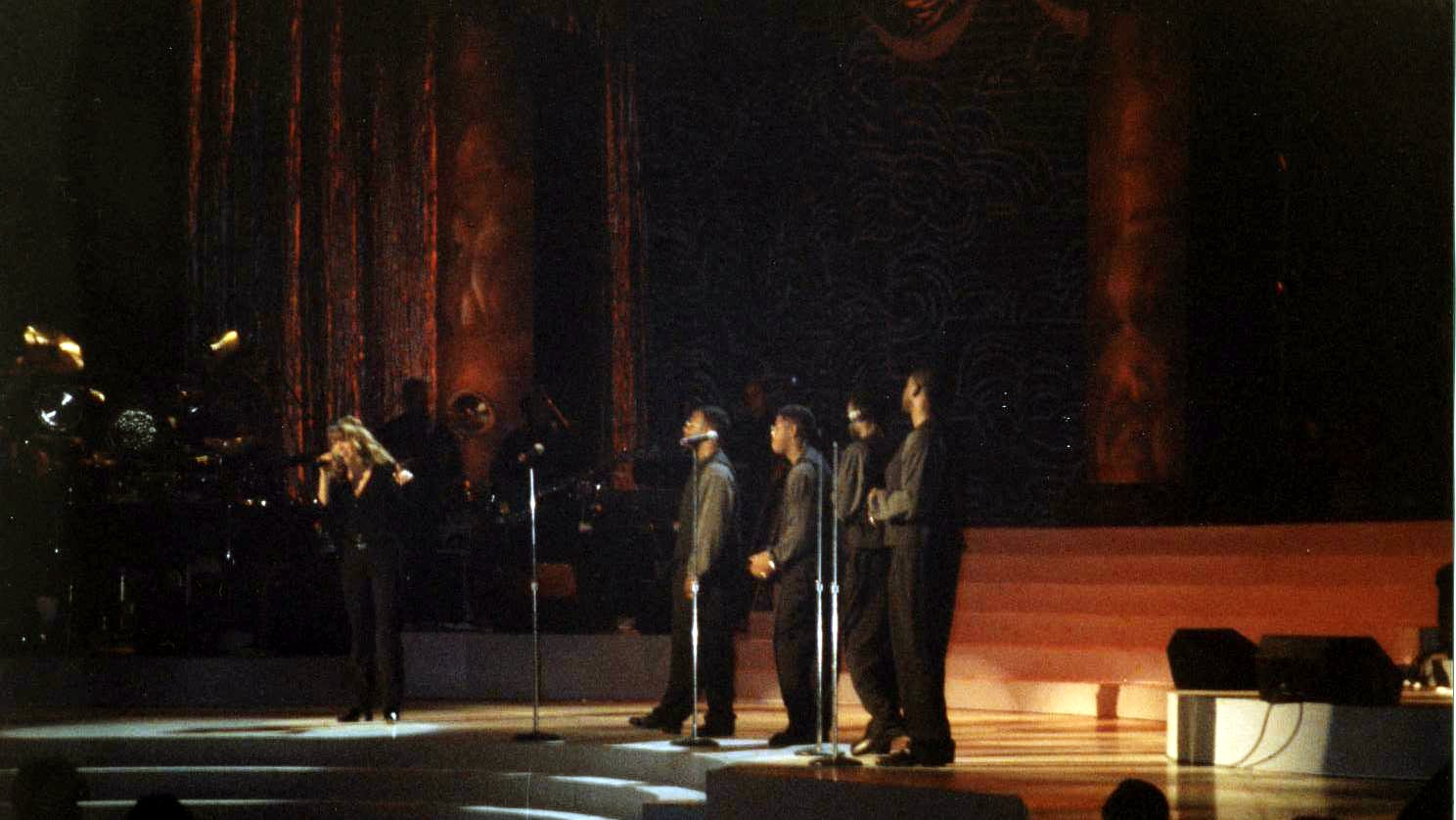
The song "One Sweet Day", performed by Mariah Carey and Boyz II Men, spent 16 weeks on top of the chart and became the longest-running number-one song in history, until surpassed in 2019 by "Old Town Road".

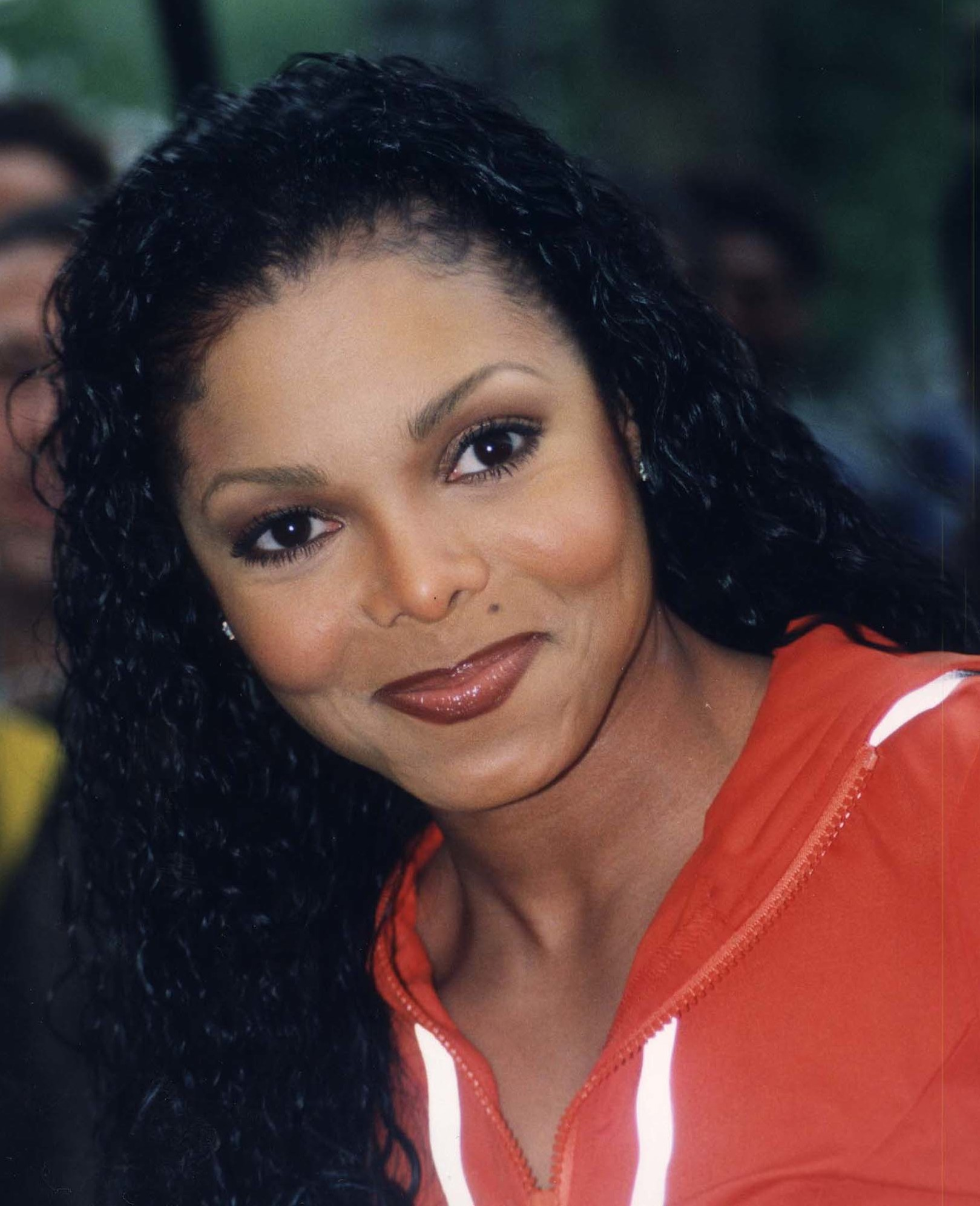
Janet Jackson earned six number-one songs on the Billboard Hot 100 chart during the 1990s.

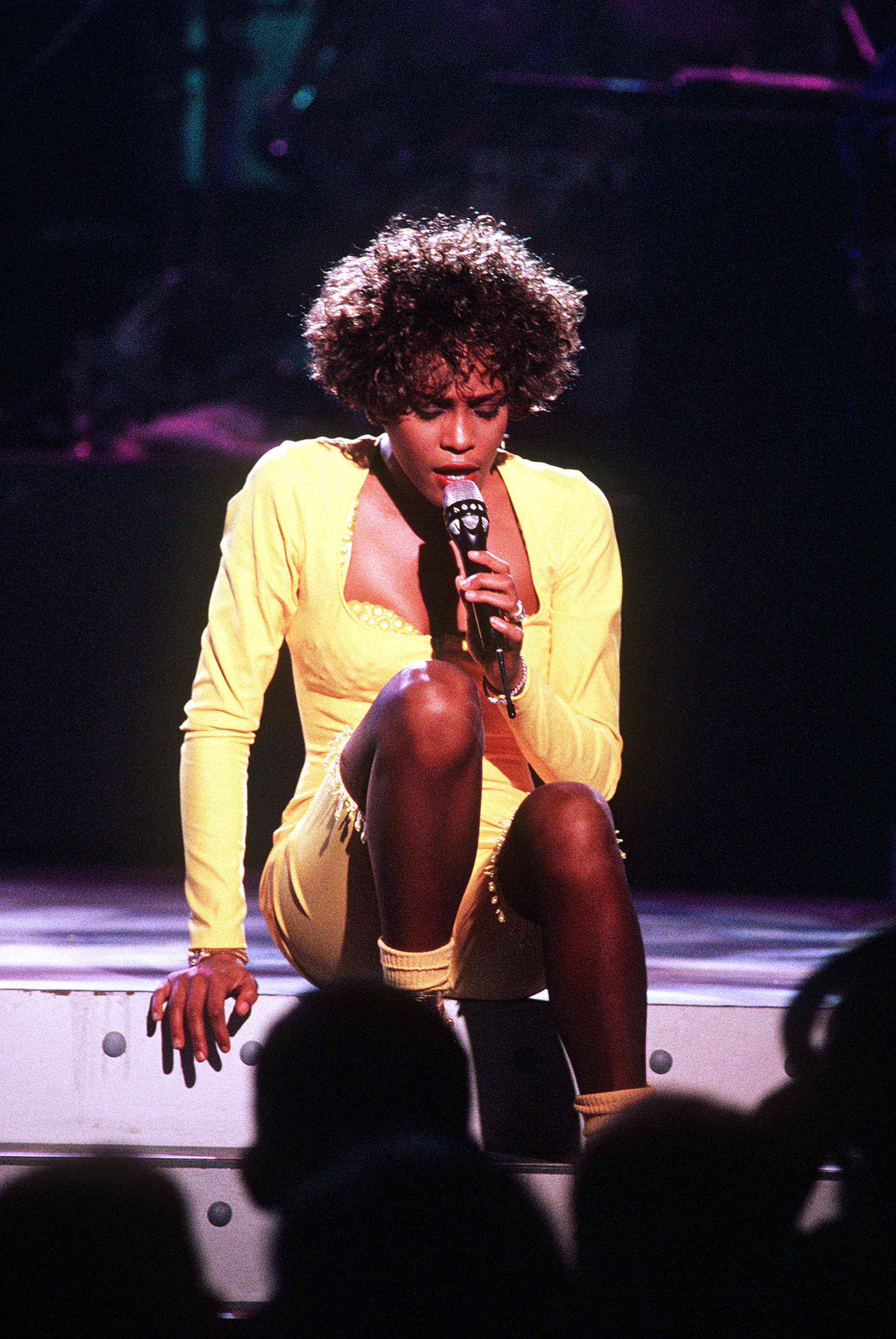
Whitney Houston's cover of "I Will Always Love You" spent 14 weeks at the top of the Billboard Hot 100, which at the time was a record.

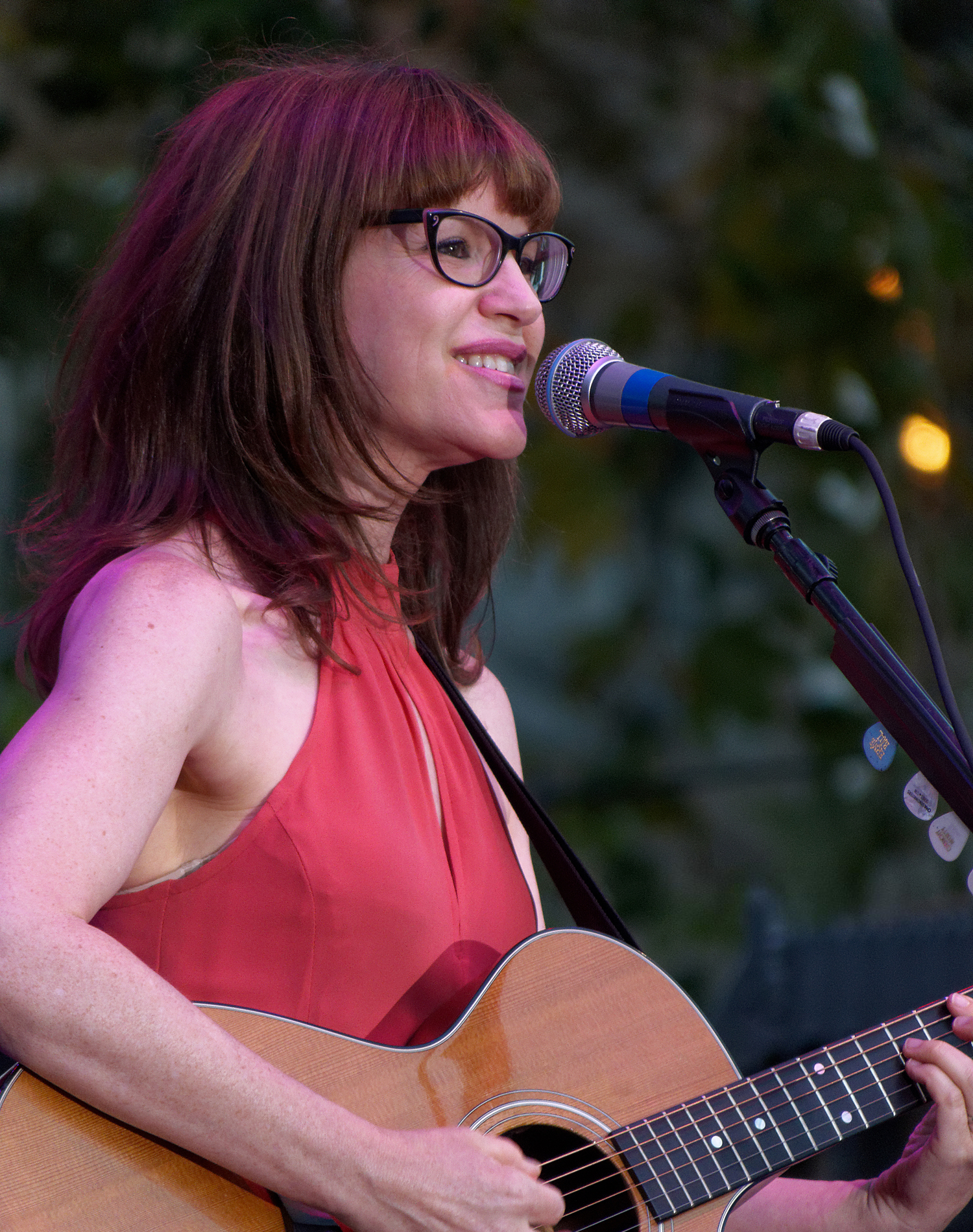
Lisa Loeb became the first artist to score a #1 hit before signing to any record label, with "Stay (I Missed You)".

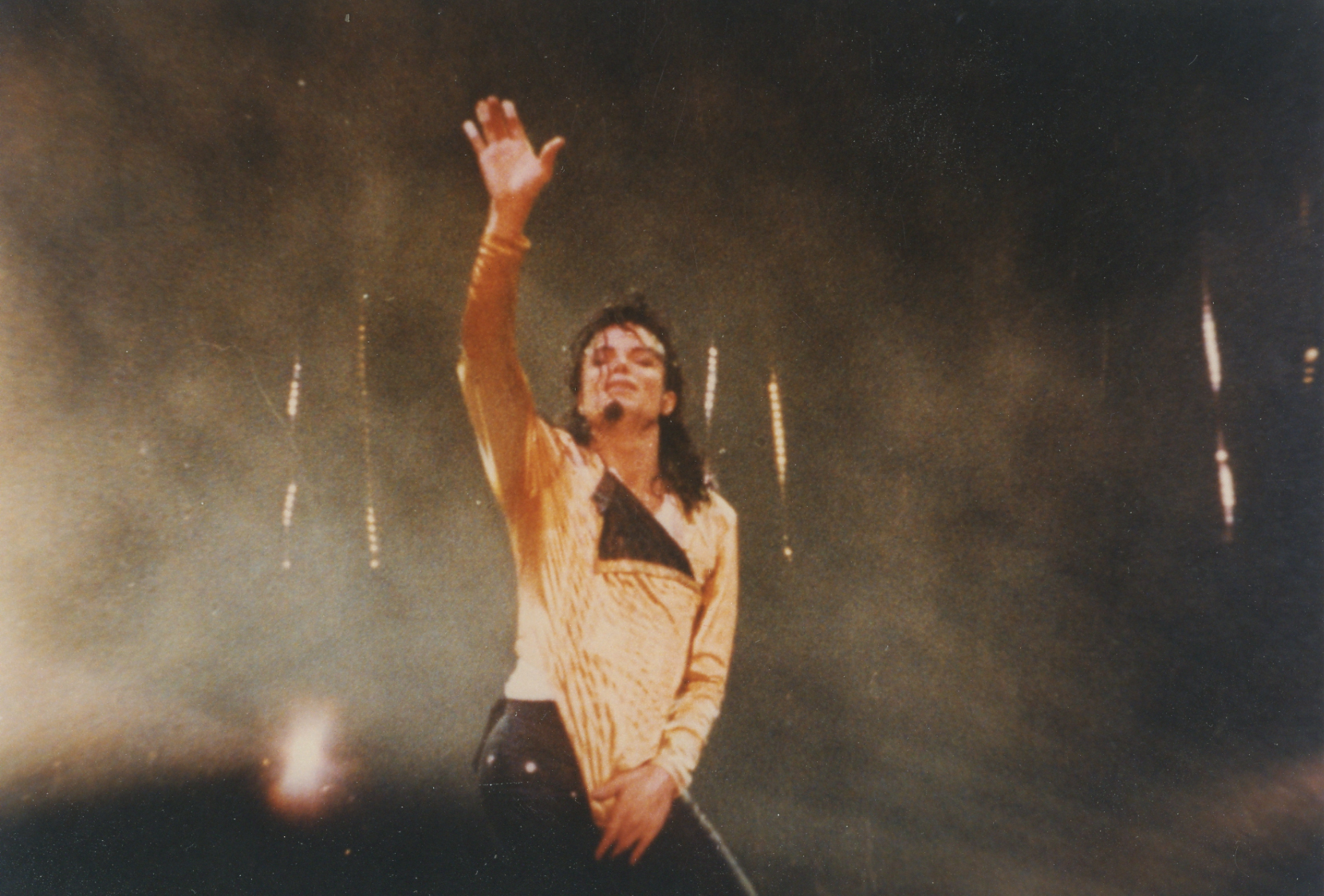
Michael Jackson became the first artist to debut at #1 with "You Are Not Alone". His song "Black or White" also spent seven weeks at number one during 1991 and 1992.

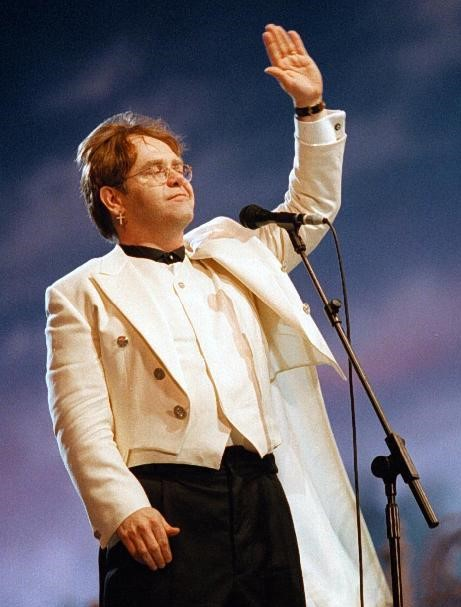
"Candle in the Wind 1997" by Elton John topped the Billboard Hot 100 for 14 weeks. It is the best-selling single in the chart's history.

#	Reached number one	Artist(s)	Single	Record label	Weeks at number one	Ref
1990
711	January 20, 1990	Michael Bolton	"How Am I Supposed to Live Without You"	Columbia	3	
712	February 10, 1990	Paula Abdul & The Wild Pair	"Opposites Attract"	Virgin	3	
713	March 3, 1990	Janet Jackson	"Escapade"	A&M	3	
714	March 24, 1990	Alannah Myles	"Black Velvet"	Atlantic	2	
715	April 7, 1990	Taylor Dayne	"Love Will Lead You Back"	Arista	1	
716	April 14, 1990	Tommy Page	"I'll Be Your Everything"	Warner Bros.	1	
717	April 21, 1990	Sinéad O'Connor	"Nothing Compares 2 U"	EMI	4	
718	May 19, 1990	Madonna	"Vogue"	Warner Bros.	3	
719	June 9, 1990	Wilson Phillips	"Hold On"♪ (1990)	EMI	1	
720	June 16, 1990	Roxette	"It Must Have Been Love"	EMI	2	
721	June 30, 1990	New Kids on the Block	"Step By Step"	Columbia	3	
722	July 21, 1990	Glenn Medeiros featuring Bobby Brown	"She Ain't Worth It"	MCA	2	
723	August 4, 1990	Mariah Carey	"Vision of Love"	Columbia	4	
724	September 1, 1990	Sweet Sensation	"If Wishes Came True"	EEG	1	
725	September 8, 1990	Jon Bon Jovi	"Blaze Of Glory"	IDJMG	1	
726	September 15, 1990	Wilson Phillips	"Release Me"	EMI	2	
727	September 29, 1990	Nelson	"(Can't Live Without Your) Love And Affection"	DGC	1	
728	October 6, 1990	Maxi Priest	"Close To You"	Charisma	1	
729	October 13, 1990	George Michael	"Praying for Time"	Columbia	1	
730	October 20, 1990	James Ingram	"I Don't Have the Heart"	Warner Bros.	1	
731	October 27, 1990	Janet Jackson	"Black Cat"	A&M	1	
732	November 3, 1990	Vanilla Ice	"Ice Ice Baby"	EMI	1	
733	November 10, 1990	Mariah Carey	"Love Takes Time"	Columbia	3	
734	December 1, 1990	Whitney Houston	"I'm Your Baby Tonight"	Arista	1	
735	December 8, 1990	Stevie B	"Because I Love You (The Postman Song)"	RCA	4	
1991
736	January 5, 1991	Madonna	"Justify My Love"	Warner Bros.	2	
737	January 19, 1991	Janet Jackson	"Love Will Never Do (Without You)"	A&M	1	
738	January 26, 1991	Surface	"The First Time"	Columbia	2	
739	February 9, 1991	C+C Music Factory featuring Freedom Williams	"Gonna Make You Sweat (Everybody Dance Now)"	Columbia	2	
740	February 23, 1991	Whitney Houston	"All the Man That I Need"	Arista	2	
741	March 9, 1991	Mariah Carey	"Someday"	Columbia	2	
742	March 23, 1991	Timmy T	"One More Try"	Quality	1	
743	March 30, 1991	Gloria Estefan	"Coming Out of the Dark"	Epic	2	
744	April 13, 1991	Londonbeat	"I've Been Thinking About You"	MCA	1	
745	April 20, 1991	Wilson Phillips	"You're in Love"	EMI	1	
746	April 27, 1991	Amy Grant	"Baby Baby"	A&M	2	
747	May 11, 1991	Roxette	"Joyride"	EMI	1	
748	May 18, 1991	Hi-Five	"I Like the Way (The Kissing Game)"	RCA	1	
749	May 25, 1991	Mariah Carey	"I Don't Wanna Cry"	Columbia	2	
750	June 8, 1991	Extreme	"More Than Words"	A&M	1	
751	June 15, 1991	Paula Abdul	"Rush Rush"	Virgin	5	
752	July 20, 1991	EMF	"Unbelievable"	EMI	1	
753	July 27, 1991	Bryan Adams	"(Everything I Do) I Do It for You"♪ (1991)	A&M	7	
754	September 14, 1991	Paula Abdul	"The Promise of a New Day"	Virgin	1	
755	September 21, 1991	Color Me Badd	"I Adore Mi Amor"	Giant	2	
756	October 5, 1991	Marky Mark and the Funky Bunch featuring Loleatta Holloway	"Good Vibrations"	EEG	1	
757	October 12, 1991	Mariah Carey	"Emotions"	Columbia	3	
758	November 2, 1991	Karyn White	"Romantic"	Warner Bros.	1	
759	November 9, 1991	Prince & The New Power Generation	"Cream"	Warner Bros.	2	
760	November 23, 1991	Michael Bolton	"When A Man Loves A Woman"	Columbia	1	
761	November 30, 1991	P.M. Dawn	"Set Adrift on Memory Bliss"	IDJMG	1	
762	December 7, 1991	Michael Jackson	"Black or White"	Epic	7	
1992
763	January 25, 1992	Color Me Badd	"All 4 Love"	Giant	1	
764	February 1, 1992	George Michael & Elton John	"Don't Let The Sun Go Down On Me"	Columbia	1	
765	February 8, 1992	Right Said Fred	"I'm Too Sexy"	Charisma	3	
766	February 29, 1992	Mr. Big	"To Be With You"	Atlantic	3	
767	March 21, 1992	Vanessa Williams	"Save the Best for Last"	IDJMG	5	
768	April 25, 1992	Kris Kross	"Jump"	Columbia	8	
769	June 20, 1992	Mariah Carey	"I'll Be There"	Columbia	2	
770	July 4, 1992	Sir Mix-A-Lot	"Baby Got Back"	Reprise	5	
771	August 8, 1992	Madonna	"This Used To Be My Playground"	Warner Bros.	1	
772	August 15, 1992	Boyz II Men	"End of the Road"♪ (1992)	Motown	13	
773	November 14, 1992	The Heights	"How Do You Talk To An Angel"	Capitol	2	
774	November 28, 1992	Whitney Houston	"I Will Always Love You"♪ (1993)	Arista	14	
1993
775	March 6, 1993	Peabo Bryson & Regina Belle	"A Whole New World"	Columbia	1	
776	March 13, 1993	Snow	"Informer"	EEG	7	
777	May 1, 1993	Silk	"Freak Me"	EEG	2	
778	May 15, 1993	Janet Jackson	"That's The Way Love Goes"	Virgin	8	
779	July 10, 1993	SWV	"Weak"	RCA	2	
780	July 24, 1993	UB40	"(I Can't Help) Falling in Love with You"	Virgin	7	
781	September 11, 1993	Mariah Carey	"Dreamlover"	Columbia	8	
782	November 6, 1993	Meat Loaf	"I'd Do Anything for Love (But I Won't Do That)"	MCA	5	
783	December 11, 1993	Janet Jackson	"Again"	Virgin	2	
784	December 25, 1993	Mariah Carey	"Hero"	Columbia	4	
1994
785	January 22, 1994	Bryan Adams, Rod Stewart & Sting	"All For Love"	A&M	3	
786	February 12, 1994	Céline Dion	"The Power Of Love"	550 Music	4	
787	March 12, 1994	Ace of Base	"The Sign" ♪ (1994)	Arista	6	
788	April 9, 1994	R. Kelly	"Bump n' Grind"	Jive	4	
789	May 21, 1994	All-4-One	"I Swear"	Atlantic	11	
790	August 6, 1994	Lisa Loeb & Nine Stories	"Stay (I Missed You)"	RCA	3	
791	August 27, 1994	Boyz II Men	"I'll Make Love to You"	Motown	14	
792	December 3, 1994	Boyz II Men	"On Bended Knee"	Motown	6	
793	December 17, 1994	Ini Kamoze	"Here Comes the Hotstepper"	Columbia	2	
1995
794	January 28, 1995	TLC	"Creep"	Arista	4	
795	February 25, 1995	Madonna	"Take A Bow"	Warner Bros.	7	
796	April 15, 1995	Montell Jordan	"This Is How We Do It"	IDJMG	7	
797	June 3, 1995	Bryan Adams	"Have You Ever Really Loved A Woman"	A&M	5	
798	July 8, 1995	TLC	"Waterfalls"	Arista	7	
799	August 26, 1995	Seal	"Kiss from a Rose"	Warner Bros.	1	
800	September 2, 1995	Michael Jackson	"You Are Not Alone"	Epic	1	
801	September 9, 1995	Coolio featuring L.V.	"Gangsta's Paradise"♪ (1995)	MCA	3	
802	September 30, 1995	Mariah Carey	"Fantasy"	Columbia	8	
803	November 25, 1995	Whitney Houston	"Exhale (Shoop Shoop)"	Arista	1	
804	December 2, 1995	Mariah Carey & Boyz II Men	"One Sweet Day"	Columbia	16	
1996
805	March 23, 1996	Céline Dion	"Because You Loved Me"	550 Music	6	
806	May 4, 1996	Mariah Carey	"Always Be My Baby"	Columbia	2	
807	May 18, 1996	Bone Thugs-N-Harmony	"Tha Crossroads"	Relativity	8	
808	July 13, 1996	2Pac featuring K-Ci & JoJo / Dr. Dre and Roger Troutman	"How Do U Want It" / "California Love"	Interscope	2	
809	July 27, 1996	Toni Braxton	"You're Makin' Me High" / "Let It Flow"	Arista	1	
810	August 3, 1996	Los Del Rio	"Macarena (Bayside Boys Mix)"♪ (1996)	RCA	14	
811	November 9, 1996	Blackstreet featuring Dr. Dre	"No Diggity"	Interscope	4	
812	December 7, 1996	Toni Braxton	"Un-Break My Heart"	Arista	11	
1997
813	February 22, 1997	Spice Girls	"Wannabe"	Virgin	4	
814	March 22, 1997	Puff Daddy featuring Mase	"Can't Nobody Hold Me Down"	Arista	6	
815	May 3, 1997	The Notorious B.I.G.	"Hypnotize"	Arista	3	
816	May 24, 1997	Hanson	"MMMBop"	IDJMG	3	
817	June 14, 1997	Puff Daddy & Faith Evans featuring 112	"I'll Be Missing You"	Arista	11	
818	August 30, 1997	The Notorious B.I.G. featuring Puff Daddy & Mase	"Mo Money Mo Problems"	Arista	2	
819	September 13, 1997	Mariah Carey	"Honey"	Columbia	3	
820	October 4, 1997	Boyz II Men	"4 Seasons of Loneliness"	Motown	1	
821	October 11, 1997	Elton John	"Candle in the Wind '97" / "Something About the Way You Look Tonight"♪ (1997)	A&M	14	
1998
822	January 17, 1998	Savage Garden	"Truly Madly Deeply"	Columbia	2	
823	January 31, 1998	Janet Jackson	"Together Again"	Virgin	2	
824	February 14, 1998	Usher	"Nice & Slow"	Arista	2	
825	February 28, 1998	Céline Dion	"My Heart Will Go On"	550 Music	2	
826	March 14, 1998	Will Smith	"Gettin' Jiggy Wit It"	Columbia	3	
827	April 4, 1998	K-Ci & JoJo	"All My Life"	MCA	3	
828	April 25, 1998	Next	"Too Close"♪(1998)	Arista	5	
829	May 23, 1998	Mariah Carey	"My All"	Columbia	1	
830	June 6, 1998	Brandy & Monica	"The Boy Is Mine"	Atlantic	13	
831	September 5, 1998	Aerosmith	"I Don't Want to Miss a Thing"	Columbia	4	
832	October 3, 1998	Monica	"The First Night"	Arista	5	
833	October 17, 1998	Barenaked Ladies	"One Week"	Reprise	1	
834	November 14, 1998	Lauryn Hill	"Doo Wop (That Thing)"	Columbia	2	
835	November 28, 1998	Divine	"Lately"	Red Ant	1	
836	December 5, 1998	R. Kelly & Céline Dion	"I'm Your Angel"	Jive	6	
1999
837	January 16, 1999	Brandy	"Have You Ever"	Atlantic	2	
838	January 30, 1999	Britney Spears	"…Baby One More Time"	Jive	2	
839	February 13, 1999	Monica	"Angel of Mine"	Arista	4	
840	March 13, 1999	Cher	"Believe"♪ (1999)	Warner Bros.	4	
841	April 10, 1999	TLC	"No Scrubs"	Arista	4	
842	May 8, 1999	Ricky Martin	"Livin' la Vida Loca"	Columbia	5	
843	June 12, 1999	Jennifer Lopez	"If You Had My Love"	Work Records	5	
844	July 17, 1999	Destiny's Child	"Bills, Bills, Bills"	Columbia	1	
845	July 24, 1999	Will Smith featuring Dru Hill & Kool Moe Dee	"Wild Wild West"	Columbia	1	
846	July 31, 1999	Christina Aguilera	"Genie in a Bottle"	RCA	5	
847	September 4, 1999	Enrique Iglesias	"Bailamos"	Interscope	2	
848	September 18, 1999	TLC	"Unpretty"	Arista	3	
849	October 9, 1999	Mariah Carey featuring Jay-Z	"Heartbreaker"	Columbia	2	
850	October 23, 1999	Santana featuring Rob Thomas	"Smooth"	Arista	12	

== Statistics by decade ==
=== Artists by total number-one singles ===
The following artists achieved three or more number-one hits during the 1990s. A number of artists had number-one singles on their own as well as part of a collaboration.

Artist	Number-one hits
Mariah Carey	14
Janet Jackson	6
Boyz II Men	5
Madonna	4
Whitney Houston	4
Celine Dion	4
TLC	4
Wilson Phillips	3
Paula Abdul	3
Bryan Adams	3
Puff Daddy	3
Monica	3

=== Artists by total number of weeks at number-one ===
The following artists were featured in top of the chart for the highest total number of weeks during the 1990s.

Artist	Weeks at number-one
Mariah Carey	60
Boyz II Men	50
Monica	22
Puff Daddy	19
TLC	18
Whitney Houston	18
Janet Jackson	17
Céline Dion	17
Brandy	15
Bryan Adams	15
Elton John	15

=== Songs by total number of weeks at number-one ===
The following songs were featured in top of the chart for the highest total number of weeks during the 1990s.

Weeks at number one	Song	Artist(s)
16	"One Sweet Day"	Mariah Carey & Boyz II Men
14	"I Will Always Love You"	Whitney Houston
14	"I'll Make Love To You"	Boyz II Men
14	"Macarena (Bayside Boys Mix)"	Los Del Rio
14	"Candle in the Wind 1997 / Something About the Way You Look Tonight"	Elton John
13	"End of the Road"	Boyz II Men
13	"The Boy Is Mine"	Brandy & Monica
11	"I Swear"	All-4-One
11	"Un-Break My Heart"	Toni Braxton
11	"I'll Be Missing You"	Puff Daddy & Faith Evans ft. 112

- "Smooth" by Santana featuring Rob Thomas spent 12 consecutive weeks at number one, on the charts dated from October 23, 1999, to January 8, 2000. Its reign at the top of the Hot 100 extended into the 2000s by two weeks, so only 10 of its weeks occurred in the 1990s, making it fall short of the 10 longest running number-ones in the 1990s if going strictly by its weeks at number one during the decade.

== See also ==
- List of UK Singles Chart number ones of the 1990s
- List of number-one hits (United States)
- 1990s in music
