= List of Cash Box Top 100 number-one singles of 1991 =

This is a list of singles that reached number one on the Cash Box Top 100 Singles chart in 1991, presented in chronological order.

Key
†	Indicates best-performing single of 1991

Issue date	Song	Artist
January 5	"Justify My Love"	Madonna
January 12	"Justify My Love"	Madonna
January 19	"Justify My Love"	Madonna
January 26	"Love Will Never Do (Without You)"	Janet Jackson
February 2	"The First Time"	Surface
February 9	"Gonna Make You Sweat (Everybody Dance Now)"	C+C Music Factory featuring Freedom Williams
February 16	"Gonna Make You Sweat (Everybody Dance Now)"	C+C Music Factory featuring Freedom Williams
February 23	"All the Man That I Need"	Whitney Houston
March 2	"All the Man That I Need"	Whitney Houston
March 9	"One More Try"	Timmy T
March 16	"Someday"	Mariah Carey
March 23	"Someday"	Mariah Carey
March 30	"Coming Out of the Dark"	Gloria Estefan
April 6	"Coming Out of the Dark"	Gloria Estefan
April 13	"I've Been Thinking About You"	Londonbeat
April 20	"Baby Baby"	Amy Grant
April 27	"Baby Baby"	Amy Grant
May 4	"Baby Baby"	Amy Grant
May 11	"Joyride"	Roxette
May 18	"Here We Go"	C + C Music Factory Featuring Freedom Williams & Zelma Davis
May 25	"Rhythm of My Heart"	Rod Stewart
June 1	"I Don't Wanna Cry"	Mariah Carey
June 8	"More Than Words"	Extreme
June 15	"More Than Words"	Extreme
June 22	"Rush Rush"	Paula Abdul
June 29	"Rush Rush"	Paula Abdul
July 6	"Rush Rush"	Paula Abdul
July 13	"Unbelievable"	EMF
July 20	"Unbelievable"	EMF
July 27	"Right Here, Right Now"	Jesus Jones
August 3	"(Everything I Do) I Do It for You" †	Bryan Adams
August 10	"(Everything I Do) I Do It for You" †	Bryan Adams
August 17	"(Everything I Do) I Do It for You" †	Bryan Adams
August 24	"(Everything I Do) I Do It for You" †	Bryan Adams
August 31	"(Everything I Do) I Do It for You" †	Bryan Adams
September 7	"(Everything I Do) I Do It for You" †	Bryan Adams
September 14	"The Promise of a New Day"	Paula Abdul
September 21	"The Promise of a New Day"	Paula Abdul
September 28	"I Adore Mi Amor"	Color Me Badd
October 5	"I Adore Mi Amor"	Color Me Badd
October 12	"Emotions"	Mariah Carey
October 19	"Emotions"	Mariah Carey
October 26	"Romantic"	Karyn White
November 2	"Romantic"	Karyn White
November 9	"Can't Stop This Thing We Started"	Bryan Adams
November 16	"Cream"	Prince and the New Power Generation
November 23	"Cream"	Prince and the New Power Generation
November 30	"When a Man Loves a Woman"	Michael Bolton
December 7	"When a Man Loves a Woman"	Michael Bolton
December 14	"It's So Hard to Say Goodbye to Yesterday"	Boyz II Men
December 21	"It's So Hard to Say Goodbye to Yesterday"	Boyz II Men
December 28	"Black or White"	Michael Jackson

== See also ==
- 1991 in music
- List of Hot 100 number-one singles of 1991 (U.S.)
