= List of Dutch Top 40 number-one singles of 1991 =

These hits topped the Dutch Top 40 in 1991.

Issue Date	Song	Artist(s)	Reference
5 January	"Ice Ice Baby"	Vanilla Ice	
12 January	"Ice Ice Baby"	Vanilla Ice	
19 January	"Ice Ice Baby"	Vanilla Ice	
26 January	"Ice Ice Baby"	Vanilla Ice	
2 February	"Ice Ice Baby"	Vanilla Ice	
9 February	"Knockin' Boots"	Candyman	
16 February	"Knockin' Boots"	Candyman	
23 February	"Crazy"	Seal	
2 March	"Crazy"	Seal	
9 March	"Crazy"	Seal	
16 March	"Liefde voor muziek"	Raymond van het Groenewoud	
23 March	"Liefde voor muziek"	Raymond van het Groenewoud	
30 March	"Liefde voor muziek"	Raymond van het Groenewoud	
6 April	"Unfinished Sympathy"	Massive Attack	
13 April	"Joyride"	Roxette	
20 April	"Joyride"	Roxette	
27 April	"Losing My Religion"	R.E.M.	
4 May	"Losing My Religion"	R.E.M.	
11 May	"Losing My Religion"	R.E.M.	
18 May	"One More Try"	Timmy T	
25 May	"One More Try"	Timmy T	
1 June	"Wind of Change"	Scorpions	
8 June	"Wind of Change"	Scorpions	
15 June	"Wind of Change"	Scorpions	
22 June	"Gypsy Woman (La Da Dee La Da Da)"	Crystal Waters	
29 June	"Gypsy Woman (La Da Dee La Da Da)"	Crystal Waters	
6 July	"Gypsy Woman (La Da Dee La Da Da)"	Crystal Waters	
13 July	"More Than Words"	Extreme	
20 July	"Driver's Seat"	Sniff 'n' the Tears	
27 July	"Driver's Seat"	Sniff 'n' the Tears	
3 August	"Driver's Seat"	Sniff 'n' the Tears	
10 August	"(Everything I Do) I Do It for You"	Bryan Adams	
17 August	"(Everything I Do) I Do It for You"	Bryan Adams	
24 August	"(Everything I Do) I Do It for You"	Bryan Adams	
31 August	"(Everything I Do) I Do It for You"	Bryan Adams	
7 September	"(Everything I Do) I Do It for You"	Bryan Adams	
14 September	"(Everything I Do) I Do It for You"	Bryan Adams	
21 September	"(Everything I Do) I Do It for You"	Bryan Adams	
28 September	"(Everything I Do) I Do It for You"	Bryan Adams	
5 October	"(Everything I Do) I Do It for You"	Bryan Adams	
12 October	"(Everything I Do) I Do It for You"	Bryan Adams	
19 October	"(Everything I Do) I Do It for You"	Bryan Adams	
26 October	"James Brown Is Dead"	L.A. Style	
2 November	"James Brown Is Dead"	L.A. Style	
9 November	"Let's Talk About Sex"	Salt-N-Pepa	
16 November	"Let's Talk About Sex"	Salt-N-Pepa	
23 November	"Let's Talk About Sex"	Salt-N-Pepa	
30 November	"Kon ik maar even bij je zijn"	Gordon	
7 December	"Kon ik maar even bij je zijn"	Gordon	
14 December	"Kon ik maar even bij je zijn"	Gordon	
21 December	"Kon ik maar even bij je zijn"	Gordon	
28 December	"Kon ik maar even bij je zijn"	Gordon	

== See also ==
- 1991 in music
