= VRT Top 30 number-one hits of 1991 =

These hits topped the Ultratop 50 in the Flanders region of Belgium in 1991.

Date	Artist	Title
January 5	Enigma	Sadeness Part I
January 12	Enigma	Sadeness Part I
January 19	Enigma	Sadeness Part I
January 26	Vanilla Ice	Ice Ice Baby
February 2	Vanilla Ice	Ice Ice Baby
February 9	Vanilla Ice	Ice Ice Baby
February 16	Vanilla Ice	Ice Ice Baby
February 23	Chris Isaak	Wicked Game
March 2	Chris Isaak	Wicked Game
March 9	Chris Isaak	Wicked Game
March 16	Seal	Crazy
March 23	Seal	Crazy
March 30	Seal	Crazy
April 6	Raymond van het Groenewoud	Liefde voor muziek
April 13	Raymond van het Groenewoud	Liefde voor muziek
April 20	Roxette	Joyride
April 27	Roxette	Joyride
May 4	Roxette	Joyride
May 11	Roxette	Joyride
May 18	Roxette	Joyride
May 25	R.E.M	Losing My Religion
June 1	R.E.M	Losing My Religion
June 8	Stef & Bob	Breek de stilte
June 15	Stef & Bob	Breek de stilte
June 22	Zucchero and Paul Young	Senza una donna
June 29	Zucchero and Paul Young	Senza una donna
July 6	Crystal Waters	Gypsy Woman (She's Homeless)
July 13	Crystal Waters	Gypsy Woman (She's Homeless)
July 20	Crystal Waters	Gypsy Woman (She's Homeless)
July 27	Crystal Waters	Gypsy Woman (She's Homeless)
August 3	Crystal Waters	Gypsy Woman (She's Homeless)
August 10	Extreme	More Than Words
August 17	Bryan Adams	(Everything I Do) I Do It for You
August 24	Bryan Adams	(Everything I Do) I Do It for You
August 31	Bryan Adams	(Everything I Do) I Do It for You
September 7	Bryan Adams	(Everything I Do) I Do It for You
September 14	Bryan Adams	(Everything I Do) I Do It for You
September 21	Bryan Adams	(Everything I Do) I Do It for You
September 28	Bryan Adams	(Everything I Do) I Do It for You
October 5	Bryan Adams	(Everything I Do) I Do It for You
October 12	Bryan Adams	(Everything I Do) I Do It for You
October 19	L.A. Style	James Brown Is Dead
October 26	L.A. Style	James Brown Is Dead
November 2	L.A. Style	James Brown Is Dead
November 9	Army of Lovers	Crucified
November 16	Army of Lovers	Crucified
November 23	Army of Lovers	Crucified
November 30	Salt-n-Pepa	Let's Talk About Sex
December 7	Salt-n-Pepa	Let's Talk About Sex
December 14	Salt-n-Pepa	Let's Talk About Sex
December 21	Michael Jackson	Black or White
December 28	Michael Jackson	Black or White

== See also ==
- 1991 in music
