= All for Love (Timmy T album) =

Studio album by Timmy T
- Released: March 24, 1992
- Genre: Pop
- Label: Quality
- Producer: John Ryan

Timmy T chronology
Time After Time (1990)	All for Love (1992)

All for Love is the second studio album from American singer Timmy T, released on March 24, 1992, by Quality Records label. The albums created three singles, "Over You", "Cry a Million Tears" and "Boats Against the Current", none of which achieved any success, although "Over You" was included in the soundtrack to the 1994 film The Raffle.

The song "Boats Against the Current" is a cover of the song by Eric Carmen.

== Track listing ==
No.	Title	Length
1.	"Over You"	3:55
2.	"Boats Against the Current" (Duet with Preska)	4:23
3.	"Lonely Without You"	3:51
4.	"All for Love"	3:00
5.	"Face to Face"	4:21
6.	"Cry a Million Tears"	4:04
7.	"Angel"	3:08
8.	"You're the One That I Love"	3:33
9.	"Don't Be Afraid of Love"	3:27
10.	"The More I See You"	3:23
11.	"One More Try"	3:15

== Personnel ==
- Arranged By – Carl King (tracks: 10), Louis Aielli (tracks: 4)
- Backing Vocals – Angel Rogers (tracks: 4), Carl King (tracks: 7), Chorale (3) (tracks: 5), Cristi Black (tracks: 3, 4, 7), *James DeBarge (tracks: 3, 8, 9), Janice Staub (tracks: 3, 6), Lisa Taylor (tracks: 4), Rickey Grundy (tracks: 5), Satchwell (tracks: 3, 5, 6, 9), Timmy T (tracks: 8)
- Bass – Nate Watts* (tracks: 1, 2, 4)
- Guitar – Charles Fearing (tracks: 1, 2, 9), Jason Roberts (tracks: 3), Kevin Chalkin (tracks: 5, 6, 7, 10)
- Keyboards – Bobby Lyle (tracks: 4, 5), Carl King (tracks: 10)
- Keyboards, Arranged By [Keyboards] – Brad Buxer (tracks: 1, 2), Carl King (tracks: 7, 8), Louis Aielli (tracks: 3, 5, 6, 9)
- Percussion – Timbali* (tracks: 1, 3, 4, 5, 6, 7, 8, 9)
- Piano – Timmy T (tracks: 11)
- Producer – John Ryan
- Programmed By [Additional] – Jason Roberts (tracks: 6)
- Saxophone [Solo] – Brandon Fields (tracks: 2)
- Soloist – Brad Buxer (tracks: 5), Carl King (tracks: 10)
