= Time After Time (Timmy T album) =

Studio album by Timmy T
- Released: June 20, 1990
- Genre: Pop, dance-pop, electronic
- Length: 33:31
- Label: Quality
- Producer: John Ryan, Timmy T

Timmy T chronology
Time After Time (1990)	All for Love (1992)

Professional ratings
Review scores
Source	Rating
AllMusic	2/5 stars

Time After Time is the debut album by freestyle singer Timmy T. It was released on June 20, 1990, by Quality Records. It peaked at No. 46 on the Billboard 200 albums chart.

Six singles were released from the album. "One More Try", the most successful single, reached number one on the Billboard Hot 100 chart in the United States. "Over and Over", "Time After Time", and "What Will I Do" also cracked the Hot 100.

== Track listing ==
All tracks are written by Timmy T, except where noted.

No.	Title	Length
1.	"Time After Time"	3:53
2.	"One More Try"	3:29
3.	"My Exceptional Girl"	3:19
4.	"What Will I Do"	4:07
5.	"Too Young to Love You"	2:41
6.	"Paradise" (Carl King)	5:07
7.	"Over and Over" (Carl King)	3:29
8.	"You're the Only One" (Carl King)	4:04
9.	"Please Don't Go" (Harry Wayne Casey, Richard Finch)	3:18

Japanese Edition

No.	Title	Length
10.	"One More Try" (Original Version)	5:14

1991 Edition

No.	Title	Length
10.	"Over and Over" (Dance Remix)	5:32
11.	"Paradise" (Jazz Remix)	6:45

== Chart positions ==
Chart (1991)	Peak position
Canada RPM Top Albums	27
US Billboard 200	46
Japan Oricon Albums Chart	73
Sweden Sverigetopplistan	48

Singles

Year	Single	Chart	Position
1990	"Time After Time"	The Billboard Hot 100	40
1990	"Time After Time"	Hot Dance Music/Maxi-Singles Sales	23
1990	"What Will I Do"	The Billboard Hot 100	96
1990	"What Will I Do"	Hot Dance Music/Maxi-Singles Sales	35
1991	"One More Try"	The Billboard Hot 100	1
1991	"One More Try"	Adult Contemporary	4
1991	"Over and Over"	The Billboard Hot 100	63
1991	"Paradise"	Netherlands MegaCharts	18
