= Corina (album) =

Studio album by Corina
- Released: August 6, 1991
- Genre: Latin freestyle
- Length: 47:53
- Label: Cutting Records/ATCO
- Producer: Aldo Marin, Carlos Berrios, Albert Cabrera, Carlos Rodgers, Andy Hernandez, Pepper, Guillermo Martinez, Luis "Capri" Duprey, Glen Friscia, Nicky Kalliongis

Singles from Corina
- 1. "Temptation" Released: April 8, 1991; 2. "Whispers" Released: 1991; 3. "Now That You're Gone" Released: March 4, 1992

Professional ratings
Review scores
Source	Rating
Allmusic	2/5 stars

Corina is the name of the only studio album by the freestyle singer Corina. It was released on August 6, 1991, by Cutting Records, in conjunction with ATCO.

== Track listing ==
No.	Title	Writer(s)	Length
1.	"Temptation"	Aida Ayala, Carlos Berrios, Frank Reyes, Luis Duprey	4:01
2.	"Now That You're Gone"	Ayala, Andy Hernandez, Guillermo Martinez	4:33
3.	"If You Believe"	Jonathon Hanser	4:50
4.	"Searching"	Albert Cabrera, Joey Moskowitz, Randy Ramos	5:03
5.	"Whispers"	Peter Zizzo	4:48
6.	"No Excuses"	Ayala, Negron, Duprey	5:30
7.	"It's My Life"	Zizzo	4:42
8.	"I've Got It in for You (Boy/Love)"	Gordon Grody, Marylee Kortes, Nicky Kalliongis	4:25
9.	"When I Miss You"	Ayala, Hernandez, Martinez	5:02
10.	"Don't Walk Away"	Zizzo	4:57
11.	"Give Me Back My Heart" (Special Extended Club Mix; Bonus Track)	George Anthony Mauro, Gus Rodriguez	6:58

== Personnel / production ==
- Track 1 Arranged, Produced & Edited by Carlos "After Dark" Berrios. Recording Engineer: Richard Joseph. Mixed by Carlos Berrios & Butch Jones. Carlos Berrios: Keyboards, Bass, Drums, Percussion
- Tracks 2 & 9 Arranged & Produced by Aldo Marin, Andy Hernandez & Guillermo Martinez. Recording Engineer: Gary Filadelfo; assistance on track 2 by Craig Marcus, Derek Lategan & Eddie Sancho. Mixed by Aldo Marin, Frankie Cutlass & Kieran Walsh; Track 9 mixed by Mike Rogers. Andy Hernandez: Keyboards; Joey Moskowitz: Piano Solo, Additional Keyboards; Frankie Cutlass: Electric Bass, Drums, Percussion, Additional Keyboards
- Track 3 Produced by Aldo Marin. Arranged & Mixed by Aldo Marin & Merv DePeyer. Recording Engineers: Mike Rogers & Eddie Sancho. David P. Scott: All Guitars; Merv DePeyer: Keyboards, Drums, Percussion; Aldo Marin: Drums, Percussion
- Track 4 Arranged & Produced by Albert Cabrera. Recording Engineer: Rick Sparks. Mixed by Aldo Marin & Mike Sparks. Joey Moskowitz: Keyboards; Albert Cabrera: Drums, Percussion; Loriana Goldstein: Vocal Backing
- Tracks 5, 7 & 10 Arranged & Produced by Carlos Rodgers, with arrangements on all three tracks by Peter Zizzo. Tracks 5 & 7 Recorded by Bart Hartglass, Carlos Rodgers & Gary Filadelfo. Track 10 Recorded by Carlos Rodgers, Craig Marcus, Kieran Walsh, Leticia Daragoza, Louie Cruz, Tommy Uzzo; recording assistance on track 5 by Louie Cruz. All 3 Tracks Mixed by Aldo Marin & Carlos Rodgers. Peter Zizzo: Guitars, Keyboards, Vocal Backing on tracks 5 & 10; Mike Lorello: Keyboards on tracks 5 & 10; James "Jimmy G." Greco: Drums, Percussion; Lorine Bang, Tina Shafer: Vocal Backing on track 5; Carlos Rodgers, Nikki Gregoroff, "Pepper", Robert Torres, Tina Shafer: Vocal Backing on track 10
- Track 6 Arranged & Produced by Luis "Capri" Duprey & "Pepper", with additional production by Aldo Marin. Recording Engineer: David Kumen. Mixed By Aldo Marin & Mike Rogers. David Kumen: Guitars; Luis Duprey, "Pepper": Keyboards, Drums, Percussion
- Track 8 Arranged & Produced by Aldo Marin, Glen Friscia & Nicky Kalliongis. Recording Engineers: Bobby Gordon & Eddie Sancho. Mixed by Mike Rogers. Alec Shantzis & Johan Brunkvist: Keyboards

== Publishing ==
- Track 1 Published by Corina Starr Sound/King Reyes Music/Berrios Publishing/Cutting Records Music (ASCAP)
- Track 2 Published by Corina Starr Sound/Swindle Pop/Synaptic Music/Cutting Records Music (ASCAP)
- Track 3 Published by Jonhans Music/It's Time Music (BMI)
- Track 4 Published by One Rascal Music/Box Of Rain Music/It's Time Music (BMI
- Tracks 5, 7 & 10 Published by PEZ Music (BMI)/Mister Rodgers (BMI)/It's Time Music (BMI)
- Track 6 Published by Corina Starr Sound/Purple Peppermint Sounds/Cutting Records Music (ASCAP)
- Track 8 Published by HTG Music/Grohdaphus Music, Inc./Magda Lane Music/Cutting Records Music (ASCAP)
- Track 9 Published by Corina Starr Sound/Swindle Pop/Synaptic Pop/Cutting Records Music (ASCAP)

== Charts ==
Album

Chart performance for Corina
Chart (1996)	Peak position
Australian Albums (ARIA)	163

Singles - Billboard (North America)

Year	Single	Chart	Position
1991	"Temptation"	Hot Dance Music/Club Play	22
1991	"Temptation"	Hot Dance Music/Maxi-Singles Sales	1
1991	"Temptation"	The Billboard Hot 100	6
1991	"Whispers"	Hot Dance Music/Maxi-Singles Sales	17
1991	"Whispers"	The Billboard Hot 100	51
1992	"Now That You're Gone"	Hot Dance Music/Club Play	28
