= Too Much (Tara Kemp song) =

Single by Tara Kemp

from the album Tara Kemp
- B-side: "Be My Lover"
- Released: 1991
- Recorded: 1990
- Genre: R&B
- Length: 4:56
- Label: Giant
- Songwriter(s): Jake Smith; Tuhin Roy
- Producer(s): Jake Smith; Tuhin Roy

Tara Kemp singles chronology
"Piece of My Heart" (1991)	"Too Much" (1991)	"Come Correct" (1994)

"Too Much" is a song performed by American contemporary R&B singer Tara Kemp, issued as the third and final single from her eponymous debut album. It was her most recent single to chart on the Billboard Hot 100, peaking at #95 in 1991.

== Chart positions ==
Chart (1991)	Peak position
US Billboard Hot 100	95
