= Whispers (Corina song) =

Single by Corina

from the album Corina
- Released: 1991
- Genre: Freestyle
- Length: 4:47 (album version)
- Label: Cutting/ATCO
- Songwriter: Peter Zizzo
- Producer: Carlos Rodgers

Corina singles chronology
"Temptation" (1991)	"Whispers" (1991)	"Now That You're Gone" (1992)

"Whispers" is the second single from American freestyle singer Corina's debut and only album, Corina (1991). Originally recorded by Rianna Paige intended for her album, however Sleeping Bag Records folded and the song was then submitted to Corina. It was the last song added on the Corina album. Junior Vasquez also did a mash-up in early 2000 with No Doubt's "It's My Life."

== Track listing ==
US 12" single

No.	Title	Length
1.	"Whispers" (Club Version)	6:37
2.	"Whispers" (Radio Edit)	4:00
3.	"Whispers" (Scream For "D" Dub)	6:36
4.	"Whispers" (AIM Apella)	4:04
5.	"Whispers" (Bonus Beats)	2:56

== Charts ==
Chart (1991)	Peak Position
Australia (ARIA)	160
US Billboard Hot 100	51
US Hot Dance Music/Maxi-Singles Sales (Billboard)	17
US Cash Box Top 100	59
