= List of Billboard Hot 100 number ones of 1991 =

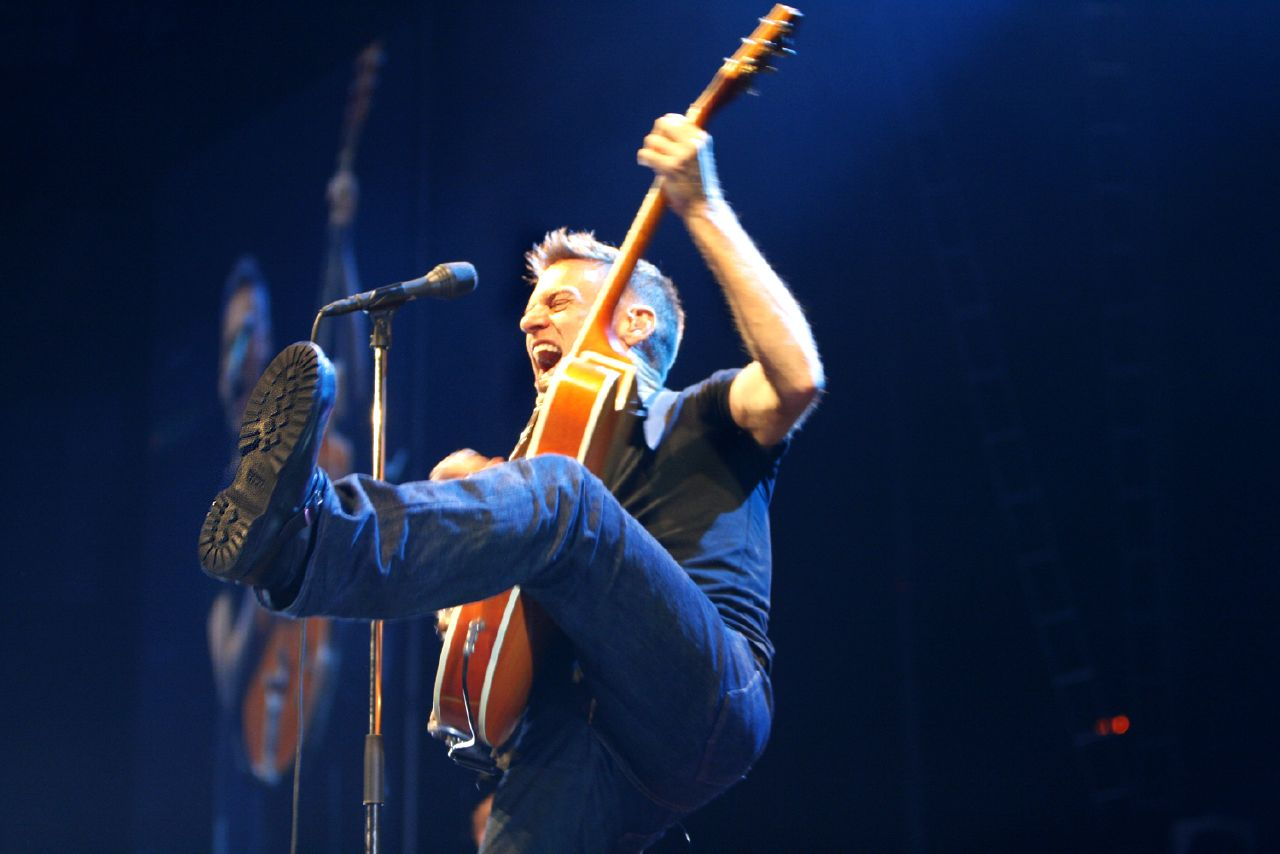
Bryan Adams (pictured) earned his second Hot 100 number-one single with "(Everything I Do) I Do It for You", which stayed at the top position for seven straight weeks.

This is a list of the U.S. Billboard magazine Hot 100 number-ones of 1991. The longest running number-one single of 1991 is "(Everything I Do) I Do It for You" by Bryan Adams, which attained seven weeks at number-one. ("Black or White" by Michael Jackson would also spend a total of seven weeks at #1, but only four of those weeks were in the 1991 calendar year.)

That year, 14 acts earn their first number one song, such as Surface, C+C Music Factory, Freedom Williams, Timmy T, Londonbeat, Hi-Five, Extreme, EMF, Color Me Badd, Marky Mark and the Funky Bunch, Loleatta Holloway, Karyn White, The New Power Generation, and P.M. Dawn. Mariah Carey and Paula Abdul were the only acts to hit number one more than once, with Mariah Carey having the most with three and Paula Abdul having two.

The November 30 chart ("Set Adrift on Memory Bliss") was the first Hot 100 to be compiled with Soundscan data. The final published issue of Billboard in 1991 was December 21, a double issue that marked the last time that the Hot 100 was "frozen" for the week off. While Billboard continued the double issues beyond 1991, the charts themselves were still compiled, available through their electronic and online services.

== Chart history ==
Key
†	Indicates best-performing single of 1991

No.	Issue date	Song	Artist(s)	Ref.
736	January 5	"Justify My Love"	Madonna	
736	January 12	"Justify My Love"	Madonna	
737	January 19	"Love Will Never Do (Without You)"	Janet Jackson	
738	January 26	"The First Time"	Surface	
738	February 2	"The First Time"	Surface	
739	February 9	"Gonna Make You Sweat (Everybody Dance Now)"	C+C Music Factory featuring Freedom Williams	
739	February 16	"Gonna Make You Sweat (Everybody Dance Now)"	C+C Music Factory featuring Freedom Williams	
740	February 23	"All the Man That I Need"	Whitney Houston	
740	March 2	"All the Man That I Need"	Whitney Houston	
741	March 9	"Someday"	Mariah Carey	
741	March 16	"Someday"	Mariah Carey	
742	March 23	"One More Try"	Timmy T	
743	March 30	"Coming Out of the Dark"	Gloria Estefan	
743	April 6	"Coming Out of the Dark"	Gloria Estefan	
744	April 13	"I've Been Thinking About You"	Londonbeat	
745	April 20	"You're in Love"	Wilson Phillips	
746	April 27	"Baby Baby"	Amy Grant	
746	May 4	"Baby Baby"	Amy Grant	
747	May 11	"Joyride"	Roxette	
748	May 18	"I Like the Way (The Kissing Game)"	Hi-Five	
749	May 25	"I Don't Wanna Cry"	Mariah Carey	
749	June 1	"I Don't Wanna Cry"	Mariah Carey	
750	June 8	"More Than Words"	Extreme	
751	June 15	"Rush Rush"	Paula Abdul	
751	June 22	"Rush Rush"	Paula Abdul	
751	June 29	"Rush Rush"	Paula Abdul	
751	July 6	"Rush Rush"	Paula Abdul	
751	July 13	"Rush Rush"	Paula Abdul	
752	July 20	"Unbelievable"	EMF	
753	July 27	"(Everything I Do) I Do It for You"†	Bryan Adams	
753	August 3	"(Everything I Do) I Do It for You"†	Bryan Adams	
753	August 10	"(Everything I Do) I Do It for You"†	Bryan Adams	
753	August 17	"(Everything I Do) I Do It for You"†	Bryan Adams	
753	August 24	"(Everything I Do) I Do It for You"†	Bryan Adams	
753	August 31	"(Everything I Do) I Do It for You"†	Bryan Adams	
753	September 7	"(Everything I Do) I Do It for You"†	Bryan Adams	
754	September 14	"The Promise of a New Day"	Paula Abdul	
755	September 21	"I Adore Mi Amor"	Color Me Badd	
755	September 28	"I Adore Mi Amor"	Color Me Badd	
756	October 5	"Good Vibrations"	Marky Mark and the Funky Bunch featuring Loleatta Holloway	
757	October 12	"Emotions"	Mariah Carey	
757	October 19	"Emotions"	Mariah Carey	
757	October 26	"Emotions"	Mariah Carey	
758	November 2	"Romantic"	Karyn White	
759	November 9	"Cream"	Prince and the New Power Generation	
759	November 16	"Cream"	Prince and the New Power Generation	
760	November 23	"When a Man Loves a Woman"	Michael Bolton	
Beginning with the next week, Billboard used sales data from Nielsen SoundScan and radio airplay from BDS to compile the Hot 100.
761	November 30	"Set Adrift on Memory Bliss"	P.M. Dawn	
762	December 7	"Black or White"	Michael Jackson	
762	December 14	"Black or White"	Michael Jackson	
762	December 21	"Black or White"	Michael Jackson	
762	December 28 (Note: This was an unpublished week, due to a special double issue that Billboard published in print the previous week, for the year-end charts, and covered two weeks; all Billboard weekly charts were "frozen" during the break.)	"Black or White"	Michael Jackson	

== Number-one artists ==
List of number-one artists by total weeks at number one
Position	Artist	Weeks at No. 1
1	Mariah Carey	7
1	Bryan Adams	7
3	Paula Abdul	6
4	Michael Jackson	4
5	Madonna	2
5	Surface	2
5	C+C Music Factory	2
5	Freedom Williams	2
5	Whitney Houston	2
5	Gloria Estefan	2
5	Amy Grant	2
5	Color Me Badd	2
5	Prince and the New Power Generation	2
14	Janet Jackson	1
14	Timmy T	1
14	Londonbeat	1
14	Wilson Phillips	1
14	Roxette	1
14	Hi-Five	1
14	Extreme	1
14	EMF	1
14	Marky Mark and the Funky Bunch	1
14	Loleatta Holloway	1
14	Karyn White	1
14	Michael Bolton	1
14	P.M. Dawn	1

== See also ==
- 1991 in music
- List of Cash Box Top 100 number-one singles of 1991
- List of Billboard number-one singles
- List of Billboard Hot 100 number-one singles of the 1990s

== Additional sources ==
- Fred Bronson's Billboard Book of Number 1 Hits, 5th Edition (ISBN 0-8230-7677-6)
- Joel Whitburn's Top Pop Singles 1955-2008, 12 Edition (ISBN 0-89820-180-2)
- Joel Whitburn Presents the Billboard Hot 100 Charts: The Nineties (ISBN 0-89820-137-3)
- Additional information obtained can be verified within Billboard's online archive services and print editions of the magazine.
