= Now That You're Gone (Corina song) =

Single by Corina

from the album Corina
- Released: March 4, 1992
- Genre: Freestyle
- Length: 4:33 (album version)
- Label: Cutting/ATCO
- Songwriters: Corina, Andy Hernandez, Guillermo Martinez
- Producers: Aldo Marin, Frankie Cutlass, Andy Hernandez, Guillermo Martinez

Corina singles chronology
"Whispers" (1991)	"Now That You're Gone" (1992)	"Summertime Summertime" (1997)

"Now That You're Gone" is the third single from freestyle singer Corina's debut album Corina.

== Track listing ==
US 12" single

No.	Title	Length
1.	"Now That You're Gone" (The K.O. Club Mix)	5:48
2.	"Now That You're Gone" (Hudson St. Dub)	5:45
3.	"Now That You're Gone" (Komix Instrumental)	4:06
4.	"Now That You're Gone" (Club Radio Version)	3:54
5.	"Now That You're Gone" (Album Version)	4:30

CD Maxi single

No.	Title	Length
1.	"Now That You're Gone" (AIM Radio Edit)	3:46
2.	"Now That You're Gone" (K.O. Radio Edit)	3:59
3.	"Now That You're Gone" (The K.O. Club Mix)	5:46

== Charts ==
Chart (1992)	Peak Position
U.S. Billboard Hot Dance Music/Club Play	28
