= Tara Kemp (album) =

Studio album by Tara Kemp
- Released: January 16, 1991
- Recorded: 1990
- Genre: Pop; R&B
- Length: 47:41
- Label: Giant/Warner Bros.
- Producer: Jake Smith and Tuhin Roy for One Two Productions

Singles from Tara Kemp
- 1. "Hold You Tight" Released: January 10, 1991; 2. "Piece of My Heart" Released: May 13, 1991

Professional ratings
Review scores
Source	Rating
Allmusic	3/5 stars
Entertainment Weekly	D

Tara Kemp is the debut studio album by U.S. singer/songwriter Tara Kemp. It was released on January 16, 1991, by Warner Bros. Records/Giant Records. It spawned two Top 10 singles on the U.S. Billboard Hot 100 chart, "Hold You Tight" (No. 3, 1991) and "Piece of My Heart" (No. 7, 1991). A third single, "Too Much", peaked at No. 95. Both of the album's Top 10 singles appeared on Billboard's Year-End chart for 1991: "Hold You Tight" at No. 25, "Piece of My Heart" at No. 84.

== Track listing ==
1. "Prologue" 0:57
2. "Hold You Tight" (Jake Smith, Tuhin Roy, William Hammond) 4:44
3. "Be My Lover" (Jake Smith, Tuhin Roy) 5:05
4. "Too Much" (Jake Smith, Tuhin Roy) 4:57
5. "One Love" (Tara Kemp, William Hammond) 4:38
6. "Tara By The Way" (Hosh Gurelli, John London) 4:03
7. "Piece of My Heart" (Jake Smith, Tara Kemp, Tuhin Roy) 4:51
8. "Together" (Jake Smith, Tara Kemp, Tuhin Roy, William Hammond) 5:07
9. "The Way You Make Me Feel" (Jennifer Jones) 4:21
10. "Something To Groove To" (Jake Smith, Tuhin Roy) 2:50
11. "Monday Love" (Jake Smith, Tara Kemp, Tuhin Roy, William Hammond) 5:04
12. "Epilogue" 1:08

== Singles ==
1. Hold You Tight January 10, 1991
2. Piece of My Heart May 13, 1991
