= Tara Kemp =

American singer

- Born: Tara Leslye Kemp; May 11, 1964 (age 62)
- Origin: Livermore, California
- Genres: R&B; new jack swing
- Occupation: Singer
- Years active: 1991 – 1994; 2013 – present
- Labels: Giant; Warner Bros. Records

Tara Leslye Kemp (born May 11, 1964), is an American singer best known for her two Billboard Hot 100 hit singles in 1991: "Hold You Tight" and "Piece of My Heart."

== Career ==
Kemp signed to Giant Records in 1990, a new sublabel of the Warner Brothers music label. In January 1991, her self-titled album and debut single "Hold You Tight" were released. "Hold You Tight" became a hit, peaking at No. 3 on the Billboard Hot 100 chart; the song was certified gold by the RIAA and ranked as the twenty-fifth most successful single of 1991. The song also peaked at No. 69 in the UK Singles Chart. In May, Kemp released her second single "Piece of My Heart," which reached No. 7 on the Hot 100 in July and came in at No. 84 for the year. A third single, the ballad "Too Much," was released and peaked at No. 95.

Subsequent to the release of her debut album, Giant began to interfere with Kemp's recording of her sophomore album. Wanting to sign to Atlantic Records – where most of the people who had signed her to Giant had moved to – Kemp asked to be released from her contract. However, Atlantic did not sign her. Kemp released two more songs: in 1993, "Action Speaks Louder Than Words" was featured on the soundtrack for the Fox television series, Beverly Hills, 90210; and "Come Correct", which was released independently in 1994. Owing to issues in her personal life, she left the music industry soon after.

In 2013, Kemp launched a Facebook page and YouTube channel containing new photography, uploads of vintage material, and teasers to a new track called "Water." In 2014 and 2015, Kemp revealed in interviews that she was working on new material. In April 2016, Kemp released "Paris in Spring" (featuring D'wayne Wiggins), her first single in 22 years, as a charity single to benefit victims of the November 2015 Paris attacks.

In January 2021, Kemp revealed plans to independently release her shelved sophomore album and remastered versions of her 1991 singles. She is working with New York City-based Shakir Entertainment Management. Tara released two Christmas songs in December 2024.

== Discography ==
=== Studio albums ===
Year	Album details	Peak positions		
Year	Album details	US	US R&B	AUS
1991	Tara Kemp: Release date: January 16, 1991; Label: Giant Records	109	34	140
2025	Come Correct: Release date: January 29, 2025; Label: Shakir Entertainment Management	-	-	-

=== Singles ===
Year	Title	Peak chart positions							Certifications	Album
Year	Title	US	US R&B	US Dan	AUS	CAN	NZ	UK	Certifications	Album
1991	"Hold You Tight"	3	4	15	68	24	19	69	RIAA: Gold	Tara Kemp
1991	"Piece of My Heart"	7	47	—	156	81	—	92		Tara Kemp
1991	"Too Much"	95	—	—	—	—	—	—		Tara Kemp
1993	"Come Correct"	—	—	—	—	—	—	—		Non-album singles
2016	"Paris in Spring" (featuring D'Wayne Wiggins)	—	—	—	—	—	—	—		Non-album singles
"—" denotes a recording that did not chart or was not released in that territory.
