= I Don't Wanna Cry =

1991 single by Mariah Carey

- US cassette cover

Single by Mariah Carey

from the album Mariah Carey
- B-side: "You Need Me"
- Released: March 1991
- Studio: Tarpan (San Rafael, California); The Plant (Los Angeles, California)
- Genre: Pop
- Length: 4:47 (album); 4:25 (edit)
- Label: Columbia
- Songwriters: Mariah Carey; Narada Michael Walden
- Producer: Narada Michael Walden

Mariah Carey singles chronology
"Someday" (1990)	"I Don't Wanna Cry" (1991)	"There's Got to Be a Way" (1991)

Music video
- "I Don't Wanna Cry" on YouTube

"I Don't Wanna Cry" is a song recorded by American singer Mariah Carey for her first album Mariah Carey (1990). Written by Carey and producer Narada Michael Walden, it was released by Columbia Records as the album's fourth single in March 1991. A Latin soul–influenced pop ballad, the torch song describes the end of romance. It features drums, guitars, digital synthesizers, and a classic song structure with highly delineated section roles. Modulations occur between these segments that emphasize the singer's emotions. Varying from whispering to belting, Carey's vocal range spans more than two octaves.

Critics viewed "I Don't Wanna Cry" as a standout track from Mariah Carey and complimented the dynamic between Carey's vocals and Walden's production. The song received high airplay across American adult contemporary, urban contemporary, and contemporary hit radio stations. It became Carey's fourth consecutive number one on the US Billboard Hot 100 Singles chart, making her the second act to have their first four entries reach number one. The Recording Industry Association of America certified it Gold. Internationally, "I Don't Wanna Cry" reached the top ten on sales and airplay charts in Canada and the top twenty in New Zealand.

Larry Jordan directed the accompanying music video, which shows Carey and a male model brooding over their tainted relationship. His director's cut version includes scenes that Columbia thought projected a sexualized image of Carey. She performed "I Don't Wanna Cry" during the 1993 Music Box Tour, the 1996 Daydream World Tour, and the 2015 concert residency #1 to Infinity. Carey's former husband and head of Columbia at the time of the song's production, Tommy Mottola, considers her lack of creative control during the process a factor in the demise of their relationship.

== Background ==
Then-backup singer Mariah Carey accompanied Brenda K. Starr to a record industry party in late 1988. Tommy Mottola, president of CBS Records Group, obtained Carey's demo tape at the gala and was immediately impressed by her voice. He signed Carey within a month to establish her as Columbia Records's answer to Whitney Houston of Arista Records. Mottola persuaded Arista promoter Don Ienner—who had been part of the marketing strategy that made Houston a household name—to join Columbia.

Although Carey requested to work on her debut album Mariah Carey (1990) with longtime co-writer Ben Margulies rather than well-known producers, Mottola felt it required further influences. To broaden the album's music, Ienner suggested they hire Houston producer Narada Michael Walden. (Note: Walden had produced songs for Houston in the late 1980s such as "I Wanna Dance with Somebody (Who Loves Me)", "So Emotional", and "Where Do Broken Hearts Go") This aligned with their view of Carey as "a franchise" with marketability to multiple demographics as Walden's work appealed to both pop and R&B audiences.

== Recording ==
Mottola phoned Walden personally to request that he write a successful song with Carey in New York. She was apprehensive and feared that her music would become "too schmaltzy" like his work with Houston. After meeting each other, the pair held a writing session at the city's Hit Factory studio where Walden heard Carey's voice for the first time. While working on some uptempo songs, he believed she needed one that was slower and melodramatic. Influenced by recordings such as Chuck Jackson's "I Don't Want to Cry", Walden began singing a concept to Carey. They composed the melody and wrote the chorus to "I Don't Wanna Cry", after which Carey completed the remaining lyrics.

"I Don't Wanna Cry" was recorded at Tarpan Studios (Note: Tarpan is Walden's personal recording studio) and The Plant Studios in California. Carey sought to redo licks multiple times during the process, and Walden agreed. After she recorded more vocals, Walden refused to incorporate them because he felt the song was complete. Mottola encouraged Carey to follow his advice but acknowledged her discontent. She never collaborated with Walden after Mariah Carey, stating, "The label was very excited for me to work with him because of his collaborations with hugely successful vocalists ... it was very important for me to keep my identity as a songwriter." Carey married Mottola in 1993 and they later divorced due to his controlling nature. Retrospectively, he considers Carey's experiences with Walden how "her whole issue of feeling controlled" came into being.

== Composition and lyrics ==
"I Don't Wanna Cry"
A pop ballad, "I Don't Wanna Cry" features Carey's singing complemented by drums, guitars, and synthesizers.

"I Don't Wanna Cry" is a torch song in the form of a Latin soul-influenced pop ballad. Like many recordings, it references the act of crying. The lyrics are simple and concern the demise of a romance: "Though I've given you my heart and soul / I must find a way of letting go / 'Cause baby, I don't wanna cry." According to David T. Farr of the Sturgis Journal, they introduce an element of vulnerability to Carey's image. Scholar Dorothy Marcic views them as an example of the progression of women's societal role as they showcase a sense of inner strength rather than victimhood like songs from previous decades.

With an introduction, verse, pre-chorus, chorus, post-chorus, bridge, and outro, "I Don't Wanna Cry" features a prototypical song structure. It is organized in compound AABA form. Set in common time, the music is played "tenderly" at a tempo of 66 beats per minute according to sheet music published by Hal Leonard. It is written in the key of F♯ minor until the first chorus when modulation to the relative key of A major occurs. The key reverts to F-sharp minor for the next verse. Upon the climax at the final chorus, a key change to B♭ major takes place. The song concludes in the relative key of G minor. This alternation constructs prosody; lyrics about breaking up ("Only emptiness inside us") are in minor key while those about moving on ("I must find a way of letting go") are in major key.

Carey engages in riffing during the song's introduction. She uses a low register during verses and an upper register for the chorus. Her vocal range spans two octaves and six semitones from the low note of C♯3 to the high note of G5. Carey's timbre varies between whispering, cooing, belting with bravura, and "raspy grit". Aside from producing, Walden plays the drums heard in "I Don't Wanna Cry". The song features an electric guitar and an acoustic guitar played by Chris Camozzi. They evoke the sound of a Spanish guitar, which was a vogue production choice at the time. The guitars are soft-sounding and play the melody while programmed keyboards are heard in the background. Walter Afanasieff worked with the keys and synth bass electronically; Ren Klyce used the Fairlight CMI digital synthesizer for rhythm programming. As with most Mariah Carey tracks, Bob Ludwig conducted mastering at Masterdisk in New York. The album edition of "I Don't Wanna Cry" is four minutes and forty-seven seconds long and an edited version lasts four minutes and twenty-five seconds.

== Release ==
"I Don't Wanna Cry" is the third track on Mariah Carey, which Columbia released on June 12, 1990. It forms the record's mass market appeal along with other ballads such as "Vision of Love" and "Love Takes Time". By early 1991, the first three singles had reached number one on the US Billboard Hot 100 Singles chart (Note: Namely "Vision of Love", "Love Takes Time", and "Someday") and the album was in the midst of an 11-week run at number one on the Billboard 200 following Carey's Best New Artist win at the 33rd Annual Grammy Awards.

Columbia issued "I Don't Wanna Cry" as the fourth single from Mariah Carey. The label distributed cassettes and 7-inch vinyls to retail in March 1991 with the album track "You Need Me" as a B-side. The latter song has a similar relationship separation theme, this time incorporating funk and rock music. A promotional CD includes a radio edit version. In Japan, Sony Music released "I Don't Wanna Cry" as a mini CD on May 2, 1991. It is featured on Carey's compilation albums #1's (1998), Greatest Hits (2001), and #1 to Infinity (2015).

== Critical reception ==
Critics judged "I Don't Wanna Cry" to be one of the best songs from Mariah Carey. (Note: Specifically Ivan Brunet of the Nanaimo Daily Free Press, J. D. Considine of The Baltimore Sun, David Hinckley of the New York Daily News, Rob Tannenbaum of Rolling Stone, and Devon Powers of PopMatters) Aside from Carey's work, it received comparisons to other ballads about relationships such as George Michael's "Careless Whisper" and Chris Isaak's "Wicked Game". Commentators considered "I Don't Wanna Cry" conventional (Note: Specifically Trevor Anderson of Billboard, Tom Breihan of Stereogum, Jon Pareles of The New York Times, and Troy L. Smith of Cleveland.com) and thought that Carey's vocal performance elevates the song's orthodoxy. (Note: Specifically Tom Breihan of Stereogum, Jon Caramanica of The New York Times, Glenn Gamboa of Newsday, Mitch Potter of the Toronto Star, and Troy L. Smith of Cleveland.com) Glenn Gamboa of Newsday regarded it as perhaps "the surest sign from her debut that [Carey]'s powerful voice could turn an average song into a hit" and Cleveland.com's Troy L. Smith reckoned although it might have generic production, that "doesn't stop Carey from rescuing the song with an amazing vocal".

Critics felt that Carey's vocals and the composition complement each other (Note: Specifically Billboard, Ivan Brunet of the Nanaimo Daily Free Press, David Hinckley of the New York Daily News, and Rob Tannenbaum of Rolling Stone) and resonate emotion. (Note: Specifically Brenton Blanchet of Spin, Pamela Bustios of Billboard, Entertainment Weekly, Barbara Jaeger of The Record, author Chris Nickson, and Julianne Shepherd of Vibe) According to Billboard, "Walden's grand production suits her acrobatic vocal style". Rob Tannenbaum of Rolling Stone thought that Carey's "downcast whispers animated the song's luxurious sorrow" and Vibe's Julianne Shepherd said "she strikes a perfect balance between vocal ability and emotional rawness." Reviewing retrospectively, Leah Greenblatt of Entertainment Weekly graded "I Don't Wanna Cry" a B+ and Stereogum's Tom Breihan scored it a 5 out of 10.

== Commercial performance ==
In the United States, "I Don't Wanna Cry" debuted at number 50 on the Billboard Hot 100 Singles chart dated April 6, 1991, as Carey's "Someday" departed the top 10. It rose from number eight to number one in the May 25, 1991, issue and replaced "I Like the Way (The Kissing Game)" by Hi-Five. The song's jump to number one was the biggest since Meco's "Star Wars Theme/Cantina Band" did the same in 1977, a feat British publication Music Week deemed "unprecedented". (Note: Billboard attributed the jump to the previous week's top eight songs all experiencing similar levels of success.) "I Don't Wanna Cry" became Carey's fourth consecutive number one on the Hot 100. This made her the second act after the Jackson 5 in 1970 to have their first four singles reach number one and the second female artist after Paula Abdul to have four number-one songs from a debut album. "I Don't Wanna Cry" spent two weeks at number one and nineteen total on the chart. As of 2018, it is Carey's 11th-best performing song on the Hot 100 and Walden's final number one as a producer.

"I Don't Wanna Cry" experienced success across multiple radio formats in the United States. The song topped at least one of the adult contemporary, urban contemporary, and contemporary hit radio charts published by Billboard, Gavin Report, or Radio & Records magazines. It received citations from performance rights organizations ASCAP and BMI for being one of the most-played songs on American radio and television stations in 1991. The Recording Industry Association of America certified it Gold in 2022, which denotes 500,000 units based on digital downloads and on-demand streams.

Outside of the United States, the song performed well in Canada. It reached the top 10 on the sales-based singles chart published by The Record (No. 7) and the airplay-based chart produced by RPM (No. 2). Elsewhere, "I Don't Wanna Cry" peaked at number 13 on the New Zealand singles chart and number 49 on the Australian singles chart.

== Music video and performances ==
The video for "I Don't Wanna Cry" shows Carey and a male model despondent about their relationship.

Carey's video album The First Vision (1991) presents a preview of the song's music video. The clip captures her singing amid red-orange lighting on an empty stage. Larry Jordan directed the official video for "I Don't Wanna Cry", which Columbia released in April 1991. (Note: The video was produced by Kim Turner and Lexi Godfrey of KRT Productions.) He had previously done so for "Someday". The sepia-toned video features Carey and a male model in a dark Midwestern United States home surrounded by candles and empty picture frames. After brooding over their tainted relationship, she enters a wheat field and cries.

The video received critical commentary. According to KQED's Emmanuel Hapsis, Carey's performance foreshadows her strong acting ability in Precious (2009). People writer Drew Mackie thought her walking barefoot appears seductive. Carey disavowed the video later in her career. As Columbia reshot scenes due to the appearance of her dress and the male model, she prefers the director's cut. (Note: Columbia's marketing strategy at the time was to present "Carey as the most agreeable young singer imaginable".) This version premiered on MTV in November 1998 and is included on her 1999 video compilation #1's.

"I Don't Wanna Cry" is not one of Carey's fondest compositions; she has seldom performed it live. The song is noticeably absent from her 1993 high-profile Here Is Mariah Carey concert. Carey sang "I Don't Wanna Cry" during the 1993 Music Box Tour and the 1996 Daydream World Tour. Her performance of the song at the Tokyo Dome during the latter is included on her compilation album The Rarities. In 2015, Carey resumed singing "I Don't Wanna Cry" for her Las Vegas concert residency #1 to Infinity.

== Credits and personnel ==
Credits adapted from the liner notes of Mariah Carey.

=== A-side: "I Don't Wanna Cry" ===
Locations

- Recorded and mixed at Tarpan Studios (San Rafael, California) and The Plant Studios (Los Angeles, California)
- Mastered at Masterdisk (New York)

Personnel

- Walter Afanasieff – keys/synths, synth bass and rhythm programming
- Chris Camozzi – acoustic guitar, electric guitar
- Mariah Carey – background vocals, lead vocals, songwriter
- Ren Klyce – Fairlight rhythm programming
- Bob Ludwig – mastering
- Narada Michael Walden – arranger, drums, producer, songwriter

Publishing

- Vision of Love Songs, Inc. (BMI)
- Gratitude Sky Music (ASCAP)

=== B-side: "You Need Me" ===
Locations

- Recorded and mixed at Skyline Studios (New York), The Hit Factory (New York), and Oakshire Recorders (Los Angeles, California)
- Mastered at Masterdisk (New York)

Personnel

- Mariah Carey – background vocals, lead vocals, songwriter
- Pat Dillett – engineering, mixing
- Omar Hakim – drums
- Rhett Lawrence – arranger, keyboards/Fairlight, producer, songwriter
- Bob Ludwig – mastering
- Nile Rodgers – guitar
- David Williams – guitar

Publishing

- Vision of Love Songs, Inc. (BMI)
- Rhettrhyme Music and BMG Songs, Inc. (ASCAP)

== Charts and certifications ==
1991 weekly chart performance
Region – Chart (Publisher)	Peak position
Australia – Singles (ARIA)	49
Canada – Retail Singles (The Record)	7
Canada – Contemporary Hit Radio (The Record)	2
Canada – Hit Tracks (RPM)	2
Canada – Adult Contemporary (RPM)	2
Cuba – Airplay (UPI)	3
Israel - Singles (IBA)	11
New Zealand – Singles (RIANZ)	13
US – Hot 100 Singles (Billboard)	1
US – Hot Adult Contemporary (Billboard)	1
US – Hot R&B Singles (Billboard)	2
US – Top 40 Radio Monitor (Billboard)	4
US – Top 100 Singles (Cash Box)	1
US – Top R&B Singles (Cash Box)	4
US – Adult Contemporary (Gavin Report)	2
US – Top 40 (Gavin Report)	1
US – Top 40/Urban Crossover (Gavin Report)	1
US – Urban Contemporary (Gavin Report)	3
US – Adult Contemporary (Radio & Records)	1
US – Contemporary Hit Radio (Radio & Records)	1
US – Urban Contemporary (Radio & Records)	1

1991 year-end chart performance
Region – Chart (Publisher)	Position
Canada – Retail Singles (The Record)	58
Canada – Hit Tracks (RPM)	21
Canada – Adult Contemporary (RPM)	15
US – Hot 100 Singles (Billboard)	26
US – Hot Adult Contemporary (Billboard)	10
US – Hot R&B Singles (Billboard)	72
US – Top 100 Singles (Cash Box)	14
US – Top R&B Singles (Cash Box)	37
US – Adult Contemporary (Gavin Report)	15
US – Top 40 (Gavin Report)	7
US – Urban Contemporary (Gavin Report)	33
US – Adult Contemporary (Radio & Records)	8
US – Contemporary Hit Radio (Radio & Records)	7
US – Urban (Radio & Records)	31

List of certifications
Region (Organization)	Units (Certification)
United States (RIAA)	500,000 (Gold)

== See also ==
- Billboard Year-End Hot 100 singles of 1991
- List of Billboard Hot 100 number-one singles of 1991
- List of Cash Box Top 100 number-one singles of 1991
- List of Hot Adult Contemporary number ones of 1991
