= Hold You Tight (song) =

1991 single by Tara Kemp

Single by Tara Kemp

from the album Tara Kemp
- Released: January 10, 1991
- Studio: Prime Cuts (New York City)
- Length: 4:44
- Label: Giant
- Songwriters: Jake Smith; Tuhin Roy; William Hammond
- Producers: Jake Smith; Tuhin Roy

Tara Kemp singles chronology
"Hold You Tight" (1991)	"Piece of My Heart" (1991)

Music video
- "Hold You Tight" on YouTube

"Hold You Tight" is a song performed by American contemporary R&B singer Tara Kemp, issued as the lead single from her eponymous debut album (1991) by Giant Records. The song contains samples of "Think (About It)" by Lyn Collins and "Kissing My Love" by Bill Withers.

"Hold You Tight" was Kemp's biggest hit on the US Billboard Hot 100, peaking at number three in April 1991. It also peaked at number one on the Billboard 12-inch Singles Sales chart and reached the top 30 in Canada and New Zealand. The single was certified gold by the Recording Industry Association of America (RIAA) on June 7, 1991.

== Track listings ==
- US 7-inch and cassette single
- Australian cassette single
- Japanese mini-CD single
1. "Hold You Tight" (radio edit) – 3:46
2. "Hold You Tight" (All Night extended mix) – 6:44
- US 12-inch and maxi-cassette single

A1. "Hold You Tight" (All Night radio mix) – 4:33
A2. "Hold You Tight" (All Night extended mix) – 6:45
A3. "Hold You Tight" (All Night instrumental mix) – 4:33
B1. "Hold You Tight" (Shaw & Jones remix) – 6:20
B2. "Hold You Tight" (Sisters Gonna Work It Out mix) – 5:15
B3. "Hold You Tight" (acapella) – 1:20

- UK 7-inch and cassette single
1. "Hold You Tight" (radio edit)
2. "Hold You Tight" (7-inch mix)
- UK 12-inch and CD single
- Australian 12-inch single
1. "Hold You Tight" (All Night extended version)
2. "Hold You Tight" (Tight mix)
3. "Hold You Tight" (Hold It Now Hit It mix)

== Charts ==
=== Weekly charts ===
Chart (1991)	Peak position
Australia (ARIA)	68
Canada Top Singles (RPM)	24
New Zealand (Recorded Music NZ)	19
UK Singles (Official Charts)	69
UK Dance (Music Week)	9
US Billboard Hot 100	3
US 12-inch Singles Sales (Billboard)	1
US Dance Club Play (Billboard)	15
US Hot R&B Singles (Billboard)	4
US Cash Box Top 100	3

=== Year-end charts ===
Chart (1991)	Position
UK Club Chart (Record Mirror)	99
US Billboard Hot 100	25
US 12-inch Singles Singles (Billboard)	36
US Hot R&B Singles (Billboard)	63
US Cash Box Top 100	24

== Certifications ==
Region	Certification	Certified units/sales
United States (RIAA)	Gold	500,000^{^}
^{^} Shipments figures based on certification alone.

== Release history ==
Region	Date	Format(s)	Label(s)	Ref.
United States	January 10, 1991	7-inch vinyl; 12-inch vinyl; cassette	Giant	
Australia	March 18, 1991	Cassette	Reprise	
United Kingdom	March 18, 1991	7-inch vinyl; 12-inch vinyl; CD; cassette	Giant	
Australia	April 15, 1991	12-inch vinyl	Reprise	
Japan	April 10, 1991	Mini-CD	Giant	
