= Corina (American singer) =

American singer

- Born: Corina Katt Ayala
- Origin: Manhattan, New York, U.S.
- Genres: Latin hip-hop, freestyle
- Occupations: Singer; actress
- Instrument: Vocals
- Years active: 1989–present
- Labels: Cutting Records; Atco Records
- Website: www.corinakattayala.com

Corina Katt Ayala, known mononymously as Corina, is an American singer and actress. She released her self-titled album on Atco Records in 1991, and charted a string of dance hits in the U.S. between 1989 and 1997. The highest charting of these was the summer 1991 hit "Temptation", which peaked at No. 6 on the U.S. Billboard Hot 100.

== Biography ==
=== Early life ===
Corina Katt Ayala was born to Puerto Rican parents in Spanish Harlem, New York and raised in South Bronx. In her teens, she became Miss Hispanic America and became runner-up for Miss Puerto Rico. Ayala spent years of formal training in ballet, voice, and theatre before landing a contract with Cutting Records, going under the name "Corina".

=== Music career ===
Corina released her debut single "Out of Control" in 1987. A year later, her second single "Give Me Back My Heart" peaked at No. 26 on the Billboard Hot Dance Music/Club Play charts. In 1991, Corina released her self-titled debut album through Atco Records. The lead single, "Temptation" became her biggest hit, peaking at No. 6 on the U.S. Billboard Hot 100. Corina toured the U.S. as a support act for Ice Cube, Boyz II Men, and Marky Mark and the Funky Bunch.

=== Acting career ===
Corina made some guest starring roles on All My Children, One Life to Live, As the World Turns, New York Undercover, and Cosby. She also starred alongside Marc Anthony in the 1990 film East Side Story. She was selected by director Tim Robbins to portray Frida Kahlo in the 1999 film Cradle Will Rock.

Corina also wrote, produced, and starred in the one-woman shows Fear & All of Me and Voices in My Head. She also wrote, directed, and starred in the sitcom pilot Latin in America. More recently, Corina created the web series Lupita Says on her YouTube channel.

== Discography ==
=== Studio albums ===
| Year | Album details |
|---|---|
| 1991 | Corina: Released: August 6, 1991; Label: Cutting/Atco; Formats: LP, CD, cassette |

| Year | Album details |
|---|---|
| 2024 | Spanglish: Released: July 28, 2024; Label: KattBox Records; Formats: LP, Digital; Executive Producers: Corina Katt Ayala & Joaquin Rosa Dennis; Engineer: Jimmy Greco; Mix Engineer: Carlos Berrios; Mastering Engineer: Mat Leffler-Schulman |

=== Singles ===
| Year | Single | Positions | | | | | Album |
| Year | Single | AUS | CAN | Billboard Hot 100 | Hot Dance Music/Club Play | Maxi Single Sales | Album |
|---|---|---|---|---|---|---|---|
| 1987 | "Out of Control" | — | — | — | — | — | Non-album singles |
| 1988 | "Give Me Back My Heart" | — | — | — | 26 | 25 | Non-album singles |
| 1990 | "Loving You Like Crazy" | — | — | — | — | 31 | Non-album singles |
| 1991 | "Temptation" | 57 | 36 | 6 | 22 | 1 | Corina |
| 1991 | "Whispers" | 160 | — | 51 | — | 17 | Corina |
| 1992 | "Now That You're Gone" | — | — | — | 28 | — | Corina |
| 1997 | "Summertime Summertime" | — | — | 86 | — | 21 | So So Def Bass All Stars: Volume II |
| 2005 | "Master and Servant" | — | — | — | — | — | Non-album singles |
| 2009 | "Run Away" | — | — | — | — | — | Non-album singles |
| 2011 | "Aunque Me Duela" | — | — | — | — | — | Non-album singles |
| 2022 | "Take Me Away" Produced by Corina, Mixed by Mike "Tweekin" Rogers, Mastered by Mat Leffler-Schulman | — | — | — | — | — | Non-album singles |
