= Piece of My Heart (Tara Kemp song) =

1991 single by Tara Kemp

Single by Tara Kemp

from the album Tara Kemp
- Released: May 13, 1991
- Recorded: 1990
- Genre: R&B; pop; new jack swing
- Length: 4:49 (album version); 3:52 (single version)
- Label: Giant
- Songwriters: Tara Kemp; Jake Smith; Tuhin Roy
- Producers: Jake Smith; Tuhin Roy

Tara Kemp singles chronology
"Hold You Tight" (1991)	"Piece of My Heart" (1991)	"Too Much" (1991)

"Piece of My Heart" is a song co-written and performed by American contemporary R&B singer Tara Kemp, issued as the second single from her eponymous debut album. The song was her second consecutive Top 10 hit on the Billboard Hot 100, peaking at #7 in 1991. The song features a rap by One Take Jake.

== Chart positions ==
=== Weekly charts ===
Chart (1991)	Peak position
UK Dance (Music Week)	19
US Billboard Hot 100	7
US Hot Dance Music/Maxi-Singles Sales (Billboard)	26
US Hot R&B/Hip-Hop Singles & Tracks (Billboard)	47

=== Year-end charts ===
Chart (1991)	Position
US Billboard Hot 100	84
