= Temptation (Corina song) =

1991 single by Corina

Single by Corina

from the album Corina
- B-side: "Loving You Like Crazy"
- Released: April 8, 1991
- Genre: Freestyle
- Length: 3:55 (radio version)
- Label: Cutting
- Songwriters: Carlos Berrios; Corina; Franc Reyes; Luis Capri Duprey
- Producer: Carlos "After Dark" Berrios

Corina singles chronology
"Loving You Like Crazy" (1990)	"Temptation" (1991)	"Whispers" (1991)

Music video
- "Temptation" on YouTube

"Temptation" is a song by American singer-songwriter Corina, released on April 8, 1991, by Cutting Records as the lead single of her debut album, Corina (1991). Co-written by Corina with Carlos Berrios, Franc Reyes and Luis Capri Duprey, the single became her biggest hit, peaking at number six on the US Billboard Hot 100 as well as number one on the Billboard 12-inch Singles Sales chart. In 2022, Rolling Stone ranked "Temptation" at number 87 in their list of the "200 Greatest Dance Songs of All Time".

== Track listings ==
All tracks are written by Carlos Berrios, Corina, Franc Reyes, and Luis Capri Duprey, except where indicated.

US 12-inch single
No.	Title	Length
1.	"Temptation" (New School Freestyle)	5:25
2.	"Temptation" (Radio version)	3:55
3.	"Temptation" (After Dark Love mix)	5:16
4.	"Temptation" (Synth Apella)	4:16
5.	"Temptation" (Dark Beats)	3:30
Total length:		22:22

US cassette maxi-single
No.	Title	Length
1.	"Temptation" (New School Freestyle)	5:25
2.	"Temptation" (Radio version)	3:55
3.	"Temptation" (After Dark Love mix)	5:16
4.	"Temptation" (Synth Apella)	4:16

US and Canadian cassette single; UK 7-inch single
No.	Title	Writer(s)	Length
1.	"Temptation" (Radio version)
2.	"Loving You Like Crazy" (radio version)	Berrios; Corina; Reyes; Jonathan Hanser; Duprey

UK 12-inch single
No.	Title	Length
1.	"Temptation" (The Lucifer mix)	6:10
2.	"Temptation" (The Hellfire mix)	5:51
3.	"Temptation" (dub mix)	6:08

UK CD single
No.	Title	Writer(s)	Length
1.	"Temptation" (Radio version)		4:00
2.	"Temptation" (The Lucifer mix)		6:14
3.	"Loving You Like Crazy" (radio version)	Berrios; Corina; Reyes; Hanser; Duprey	4:05

== Personnel ==
- Corina – lead and backing vocals
- Carlos Berrios – keyboards, bass, drums

== Charts ==
=== Weekly charts ===
Chart (1991)	Peak position
Australia (ARIA)	57
Canada Top Singles (RPM)	36
Canada Dance/Urban (RPM)	7
US Billboard Hot 100	6
US 12-inch Singles Sales (Billboard)	1
US Dance Club Play (Billboard)	22
US Cash Box Top 100	5

=== Year-end charts ===
Chart (1991)	Position
US Billboard Hot 100	58
US 12-inch Singles Sales (Billboard)	6
US Cash Box Top 100	49

== Release history ==
Region	Date	Format(s)	Label(s)	Ref.
United States	April 8, 1991	—N/a	Cutting	
Australia	August 12, 1991	Cassette	ATCO	
Australia	September 30, 1991	12-inch vinyl; CD	ATCO	
