= One More Try (Timmy T song) =

1990 single by Timmy T

- US retail cassette single; the US CD format was promo-only

Single by Timmy T

from the album Time After Time
- B-side: "What Will I Do"
- Released: October 24, 1990
- Genre: Pop; freestyle
- Length: 3:29
- Label: Quality; Pump
- Songwriter: Timothy Torres
- Producer: Timothy Torres

Timmy T singles chronology
"What Will I Do" (1990)	"One More Try" (1990)	"Over and Over" (1991)

"One More Try" is a song by American musician Timmy T, who both wrote and produced the song. He was inspired to create the song after breaking up with a girlfriend. Released in October 1990, by Pump and Quality Records, it topped the US Billboard Hot 100 on March 23, 1991, and entered the top 10 in Belgium, Canada, Germany, the Netherlands (where it reached number one), and Sweden. It was the first single to top the Hot 100 on an independent record label since Lionel Richie's "Truly" in 1982. The accompanying music video was directed by Alan Calzatti and was shot at Venice, Hollywood, Santa Monica, California.

== Track listings ==
US 7-inch and cassette single
No.	Title	Length
1.	"One More Try" (radio version)	3:28
2.	"One More Try" (original version)	5:18

US 12-inch single (A)
No.	Title	Length
1.	"One More Try" (radio version)	3:28
2.	"One More Try" (instrumental version)	4:17
3.	"One More Try" (original version)	5:18

US 12-inch single (B)
No.	Title	Length
1.	"One More Try"
2.	"What Will I Do"
3.	"One More Try" (slow version)

European 7-inch and cassette single
No.	Title	Length
1.	"One More Try"	3:28
2.	"What Will I Do"	3:36

European 12-inch single
No.	Title	Length
1.	"One More Try" (slow version)
2.	"One More Try"
3.	"What Will I Do"

Japanese mini-CD single
No.	Title	Length
1.	"One More Try"	3:29
2.	"My Exceptional Girl"	3:19

== Charts ==
=== Weekly charts ===
Weekly chart performance for "One More Try"
Chart (1991)	Peak position
Australia (ARIA)	36
Austria (Ö3 Austria Top 40)	12
Belgium (Ultratop 50 Flanders)	3
Canada Top Singles (RPM)	7
Canada Adult Contemporary (RPM)	4
Europe (Eurochart Hot 100)	11
Germany (GfK)	8
Japan (Oricon)	73
Netherlands (Dutch Top 40)	1
Netherlands (Single Top 100)	2
New Zealand (Recorded Music NZ)	32
Sweden (Sverigetopplistan)	5
Switzerland (Schweizer Hitparade)	16
UK Singles (Official Charts)	97
UK Airplay (Music Week)	58
US Billboard Hot 100	1
US Adult Contemporary (Billboard)	4
US Cash Box Top 100	1

=== Year-end charts ===
Year-end chart performance for "One More Try"
Chart (1991)	Position
Belgium (Ultratop)	19
Canada Top Singles (RPM)	66
Canada Adult Contemporary (RPM)	45
Europe (Eurochart Hot 100)	78
Germany (Media Control)	40
Netherlands (Dutch Top 40)	10
Netherlands (Single Top 100)	13
Sweden (Topplistan)	36
US Billboard Hot 100	5
US Adult Contemporary (Billboard)	42
US Cash Box Top 100	4

== Certifications ==
Certifications and sales for "One More Try"
Region	Certification	Certified units/sales
United States (RIAA)	Platinum	1,000,000^{^}
^{^} Shipments figures based on certification alone.

== Release history ==
Release dates and formats for "One More Try"
Region	Date	Format(s)	Label(s)	Ref.
United States	October 24, 1990	7-inch vinyl; 12-inch vinyl; cassette	Quality; Pump	
United Kingdom	February 18, 1991	7-inch vinyl; 12-inch vinyl; CD; cassette	Pump	
Australia	March 18, 1991	Cassette	Possum	
Japan	April 12, 1991	Mini-CD	DJ:	
Australia	May 6, 1991	CD	Possum	

== See also ==
- List of Billboard Hot 100 number-one singles of 1991
- Billboard Year-End Hot 100 singles of 1991
