= Joyride (Roxette song) =

1991 single by Roxette

Single by Roxette

from the album Joyride
- B-side: "Come Back (Before You Leave)"
- Released: 25 February 1991
- Recorded: July 1990
- Studio: EMI (Stockholm, Sweden)
- Genre: Pop rock
- Length: 4:24 (album version); 3:58 (7-inch single)
- Label: EMI
- Songwriter: Per Gessle
- Producer: Clarence Öfwerman

Roxette singles chronology
"It Must Have Been Love" (1990)	"Joyride" (1991)	"Fading Like a Flower (Every Time You Leave)" (1991)

Music videos
- "Joyride" on YouTube
- "Joyride [Remastered]" on YouTube

"Joyride" is a song by Swedish pop rock duo Roxette. Written by Per Gessle and produced by Clarence Öfwerman, it was released on 25 February 1991 by EMI Records as the lead single from their third studio album, Joyride (1991). It became one of Roxette's biggest hits and was one of the most successful singles of 1991, topping multiple record charts across Europe, as well as in Australia, Canada, and the United States. The song's accompanying music video, directed by Doug Freel, received heavy rotation on MTV Europe.

== Recording and release ==
Per Gessle has said that the opening line of the song was inspired by a note his girlfriend (now wife) left on his piano, which read: "Hej, din tok, jag älskar dig" ("Hello, you fool, I love you"). Its title was derived from an interview in which Paul McCartney compared writing songs with John Lennon to "a long joyride". Roxette's former tour manager Dave Edwards is credited with narration on the song.

== Critical reception ==
AllMusic editor Bryan Buss described the song as a "chanting carnival" in his review of the Joyride album. Larry Flick from Billboard magazine named it a "playful pop/rock ditty with a catchy chorus that is destined to make a quick sprint up the charts." Jim Farber from Entertainment Weekly noted that "they blithely toss a bit of whistling into 'Joyride', next to some psychedelic Beatles-like flourishes." Dave Sholin from the Gavin Report wrote, "Plenty of reason for joy in Top 40 land as Per Gessle and Marie Fredriksson deliver the first of a new batch of songs. Wisely, the Swedish duo retain "Look Sharp" producer Clarence Ofwerman, and, once again it's clear all three understand the way to a pop music fan's heart. Roxette has re-applied that happy, feelgood formula to making mass appeal records, and it's earned them instant recognition and remarkable chart success. This title track from their new album is certain to not only meet everyone's expectations, but surpass them." Pan-European magazine Music & Media complimented the song as "a perfect example of their pop sensibilities."

Brendon Veevers from Renowned for Sound commented, "There isn't a soul alive who cannot say they don’t love this track – Roxette fan or not. It's pop at its finest and the video is equally as memorable; the band speeding down a U.S highway, playing guitar on top of a red Corvette." Rolling Stones J.D. Considine said that the song is "decked out in a glossy, Sgt. Pepper-style arrangement". Mark Frith from Smash Hits labeled it as a "over-the-top" pop song, "with catchy choruses that remind you slightly of those other musical Swedes, ABBA." A writer for Cleveland.com ranked "Joyride" the 46th best Billboard Hot 100 number one of the 1990s, saying: "Even more so than the group's biggest hit, 'It Must Have Been Love', 'Joyride' showed off Per Gessle's ability to craft fantastic pop-rock songs. The song's pop spirit and rock swagger mesh seamlessly."

== Commercial performance ==
The song became one of the duo's biggest hits and was one of the most successful singles of 1991. It was their first number one single in their home country and their first platinum-certified single there. It also topped the charts in numerous other territories, including Austria, the Netherlands, Norway, Spain and Switzerland. The song spent eight weeks at number one in Germany, where it was certified gold by the Bundesverband Musikindustrie for sales in excess of 250,000 copies. "Joyride" peaked at number four on the UK Singles Chart, their second-highest chart placing there—behind top three hit "It Must Have Been Love".

The song spent three weeks atop the Australian Singles Chart, and was certified platinum by the Australian Recording Industry Association for shipments in excess of 70,000 units. It went on to remain one of the top ten-best selling singles of the year in that country. It was their fourth and last number one single on the US Billboard Hot 100 chart. It also topped the national RPM singles chart in Canada, where it was certified gold by Music Canada (formerly the Canadian Recording Industry Association) for shipments in excess of 50,000 units, and nominated for a Juno Award in 1992 for Best Selling Single by a Foreign Artist.

== Music video ==
The music video for "Joyride" was directed by Doug Freel. It was made as a playful and spectacular video, where Fredriksson and Gessle, among other things, sat on a car while a driver laying down, being invisible to the camera took care of the gas and brake. The video received heavy rotation on MTV Europe in March 1991. To celebrate the 30th anniversary of the song reaching #1 on the US Billboard Hot 100 on 11 May 1991, the video was restored and premiered in 4K on YouTube in 2021. Gessle told about the restoring process, "Some so-called “green screen” scenes have been removed, because they were very difficult to recreate. Instead, we've found other goodies in the raw material. In the long run, however, we plan to restore the video completely – and perhaps also other Roxette videos – in 4K resolution." By February 2024, "Joyride" had generated more than 14 million views.

== In popular culture ==
During the 1994 Stanley Cup playoffs, the song was used as the intro music of the Vancouver Canucks as they took to the ice before each game.

The 2024 Roxette jukebox musical is titled Joyride the Musical.

== Formats and track listings ==
All songs were written and composed by Per Gessle.

- Cassette and 7-inch single (Sweden 1364002 · UK TCEM177 · US 4JM-50342)
1. "Joyride" (7-inch version) – 3:58
2. "Come Back (Before You Leave)" – 4:34
- 12-inch single (Sweden 1364006 · Germany 1C-060-1364006)
1. "Joyride" (12-inch version / magicfriendmix) – 6:08
2. "Joyride" (7-inch version) – 3:58
3. "Come Back (Before You Leave)" – 4:34
- CD single (Sweden 1364002 · UK CDEM177)
1. "Joyride" (7-inch version) – 3:58
2. "Come Back (Before You Leave)" – 4:34
3. "Joyride" (12-inch version / magicfriendmix) – 6:08
4. "Joyride" (US remix) – 4:04

== Personnel ==
Credits are adapted from the liner notes of The Rox Box/Roxette 86–06.

Studios

- Recorded in July 1990 at EMI Studios (Stockholm, Sweden)
- Mixed at EMI Studios

Musicians

- Marie Fredriksson – vocals
- Per Gessle – vocals, whistling, mixing
- Anders Herrlin – programming and engineering
- Jonas Isacsson – guitars
- Clarence Öfwerman – keyboards, programming, production, mixing
- Alar Suurna – mixing, engineering
- Dave Edwards – narration

== Charts ==
=== Weekly charts ===
Chart (1991)	Peak position
Australia (ARIA)	1
Austria (Ö3 Austria Top 40)	1
Belgium (Ultratop 50 Flanders)	1
Canada Retail Singles (The Record)	1
Canada Top Singles (RPM)	1
Canada Adult Contemporary (RPM)	12
Denmark (IFPI)	1
Europe (European Hot 100)	1
Europe (European Hit Radio)	1
Finland (Suomen virallinen lista)	2
France (SNEP)	39
Germany (GfK)	1
Greece (IFPI)	7
Ireland (IRMA)	9
Italy (Musica e dischi)	3
Luxembourg (Radio Luxembourg)	1
Netherlands (Dutch Top 40)	1
Netherlands (Single Top 100)	1
New Zealand (Recorded Music NZ)	3
Norway (VG-lista)	1
Portugal (AFP)	1
Sweden (Sverigetopplistan)	1
Switzerland (Schweizer Hitparade)	1
UK Singles (Official Charts)	4
UK Airplay (Music Week)	4
Uruguay (UPI)	7
US Billboard Hot 100	1
US Adult Contemporary (Billboard)	21
US Cash Box Top 100	1
Zimbabwe (ZIMA)	1

=== Year-end charts ===
Chart (1991)	Position
Australia (ARIA)	9
Austria (Ö3 Austria Top 40)	6
Belgium (Ultratop 50 Flanders)	7
Canada Top Singles (RPM)	6
Canada Adult Contemporary (RPM)	95
Europe (European Hot 100)	4
Europe (European Hit Radio)	3
Germany (Media Control)	4
Ireland (IRMA)	3
Netherlands (Dutch Top 40)	11
Netherlands (Single Top 100)	12
New Zealand (RIANZ)	37
Norway Russetid Period (VG-lista)	1
Sweden (Topplistan)	3
Switzerland (Schweizer Hitparade)	2
UK Singles (OCC)	47
US Billboard Hot 100	23
US Cash Box Top 100	33

=== Decade-end charts ===
Chart (1990–1999)	Position
Austria (Ö3 Austria Top 40)	86
Canada (Nielsen SoundScan)	42

== Certifications ==
Region	Certification	Certified units/sales
Australia (ARIA)	Platinum	70,000^{^}
Austria (IFPI Austria)	Gold	25,000^{*}
Canada (Music Canada)	Gold	50,000^{^}
Germany (BVMI)	Gold	250,000^{^}
New Zealand (RMNZ)	Gold	15,000^{‡}
Sweden (GLF)	Platinum	50,000^{^}
^{*} Sales figures based on certification alone.^{^} Shipments figures based on certification alone.^{‡} Sales+streaming figures based on certification alone.

== Release history ==
Region	Date	Format(s)	Label(s)	Ref.
United States	February 1991	—N/a	EMI USA	
Australia	25 February 1991	7-inch vinyl; cassette	EMI	
Europe	25 February 1991	7-inch vinyl; CD	EMI	
United Kingdom	25 February 1991	7-inch vinyl; 12-inch vinyl; CD; cassette	EMI	
Japan	27 February 1991	Mini-CD	EMI	
Australia	11 March 1991	12-inch vinyl	EMI	

== See also ==
- List of European number-one airplay songs of the 1990s
- List of number-one hits in Australia
- List of number-one hits in Austria
- List of number-one hits in Belgium (Flanders)
- List of number-one hits in Germany
- List of number-one hits in the Netherlands
- List of number-one hits in Norway
- List of number-one hits in Switzerland
- List of number-one hits on the Billboard Hot 100
