= Timmy T =

American singer

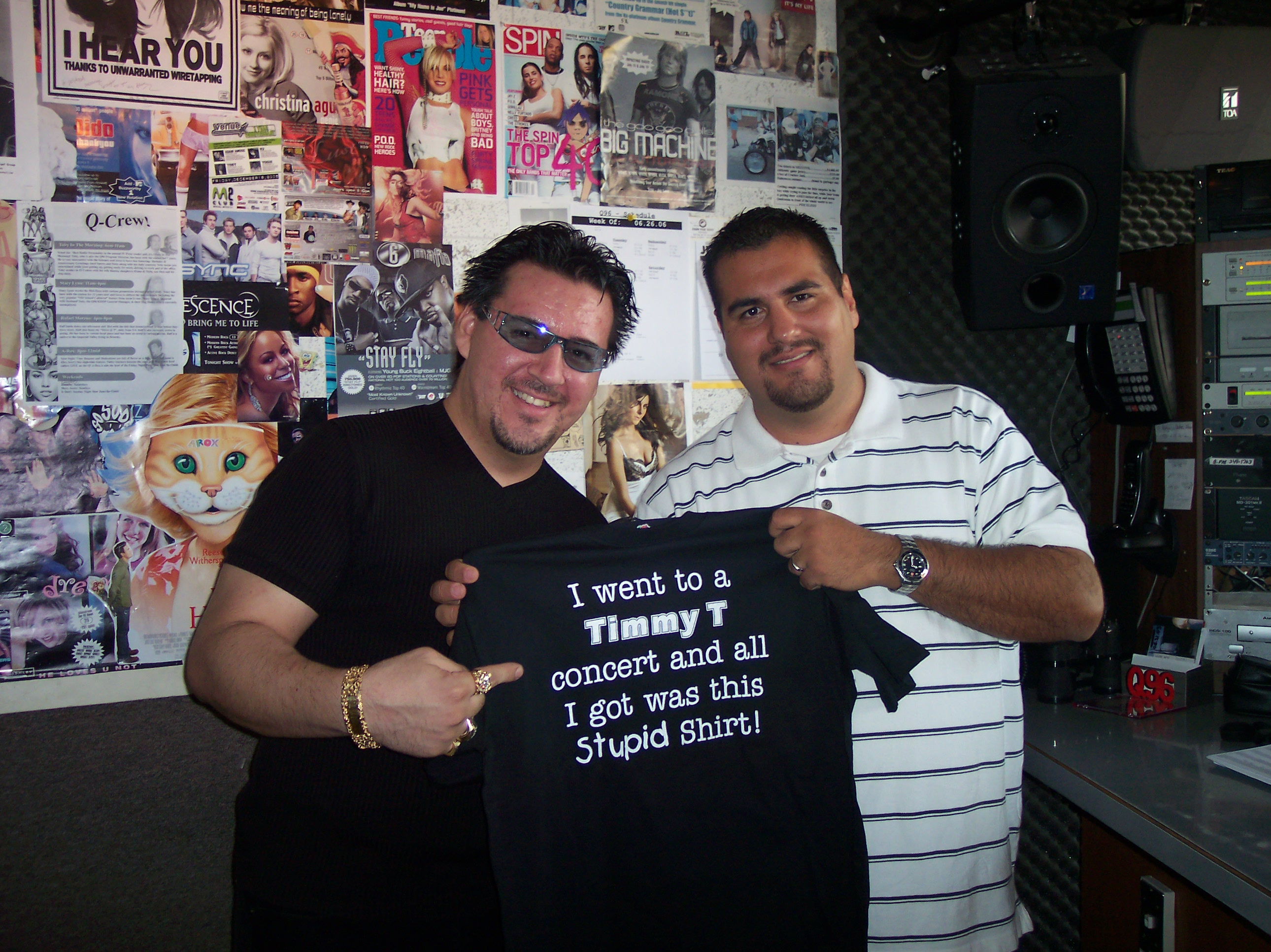
- Timmy T (left) co-hosts with Morning personality DJ Toby on KSIQ-FM in 2006

Background information
- Born: Timothy Torres; September 21, 1967 (age 59); Fresno, California
- Genres: Pop, freestyle
- Occupations: Actor, musician
- Years active: 1989–present

Timmy Torres (born September 21, 1967), professionally known as Timmy T, is an American freestyle performer and musician. In 1991, Torres topped the Billboard Hot 100 with "One More Try."

== Career ==
Torres started his career in the 1980s in small rap groups in Fresno, but he soon realised that he preferred dance music. He purchased a Moog synthesizer and a Roland TR-808 drum machine at a pawn shop, and recorded his first single, "Time After Time", in his garage. He originally recorded the song for his girlfriend who enjoyed the song, and he decided to get the single pressed on vinyl. He visited a local Fresno radio station to ask them to play his song, and after it was played, people called in to ask who performed it. The DJ recommended that Torres take his record to radio stations in Los Angeles for more exposure. After Los Angeles pop station Power 106 played the record, it received airplay from several more stations throughout the country including Hot 97 in New York. Timmy got a record deal with Quality Records, and "Time After Time" went on to peak at #40 on the Billboard Hot 100 singles chart.

His next single "What Will I Do", peaked at #96 on the Billboard Hot 100 singles chart.

He released another single at the end of 1990, the ballad "One More Try", which proved to be much more successful than his first single, selling over a million copies and climbing to the top of the Billboard charts the following year. The success of the single drove the album, called Time After Time, to the #46 spot on the Billboard 200 albums chart. the album featured the title track (his first single), "What Will I Do", "One More Try", and "Over and Over".

None of the singles from his second album, All For Love, reached the charts, however his song "Over You" was featured in the motion picture The Raffle in the company of Elton John. The other singles of the second album were "Cry a Million Tears" and a cover of the song originally by Eric Carmen "Boats Against the Current". A year after the release of his second album, he distanced himself from the spotlight to focus on the birth of his son.

In 2018 he appeared on the Tosh.0 "Web Redemption Reunion Spectacular", singing "One More Try".

As of 2019, Timmy T was still performing along with other freestyle acts from the late 80s and early 90s.

== Discography ==
=== Studio albums ===
List of studio albums, with selected details and chart positions
Title	Album details	Peak chart positions			
Title	Album details	CAN	US	JPN	SWE
Time After Time	Released: June 20, 1990; Label: Quality	27	46	73	48
All for Love	Released: March 24, 1992; Label: Quality	—	—	—	—
"-" denotes a release that did not make the stop.

=== Compilation albums ===
List of compilation albums, with selected details
Title	Album details
One More Try: The Collection	Released: April 3, 2006; Label: ZYX Music

=== Singles ===
List of singles, with selected chart positions
Title	Year	Peak chart positions				Album
Title	Year	US	AUS	NED	GER	Album
"Time After Time"	1990	40	—	—	—	Time After Time
"What Will I Do"	1990	96	—	—	—	Time After Time
"One More Try"	1991	1	36	2	8	Time After Time
"Over and Over"	1991	63	—	—	—	Time After Time
"Paradise"	1991	—	—	18	—	Time After Time
"Too Young to Love You"	1991	—	—	—	—	Time After Time
"Over You"	1992	—	—	—	—	All for Love
"Cry a Million Tears"	1992	—	—	—	—	All for Love
"Boats Against the Current"	1992	—	—	—	—	All for Love

== Music videos ==
Year	Single
1990	"Time After Time"
1991	"One More Try"
1991	"Over and Over"
1991	"Paradise"
1991	"Too Young to Love You"
1992	"Over You"

== See also ==
- List of artists who reached number one in the United States
