= Dreamlover =

1993 single by Mariah Carey

Single by Mariah Carey

from the album Music Box
- B-side: "Do You Think of Me"
- Released: July 27, 1993
- Recorded: 1993
- Studio: Right Track (New York City)
- Genre: Pop; R&B; dance
- Length: 3:53
- Label: Columbia
- Composers: Mariah Carey; Dave Hall
- Lyricist: Mariah Carey
- Producers: Mariah Carey; Dave Hall; Walter Afanasieff

Mariah Carey singles chronology
"If It's Over" (1992)	"Dreamlover" (1993)	"Hero" (1993)

Music video
- "Dreamlover" on YouTube

"Dreamlover" is a song recorded by American singer-songwriter Mariah Carey for her third studio album, Music Box (1993). Columbia Records issued it as the album's lead single on July 27, 1993. The lyrics, written by Carey, describe the narrator's yearning for an ideal lover who will not disappoint her as others have before. Carey and Dave Hall composed the music; they produced the song with Walter Afanasieff. A pop, R&B, and dance track with new jack swing and hip-hop influences, "Dreamlover" features keyboards, synthesizers, programmed drums, and electric organ. Its melody and instrumentation feature a sample of the hook from "Blind Alley" (1971) by the Emotions.

Music critics deemed "Dreamlover" a highlight from Music Box and praised its production. Carey's lyricism and restrained vocals garnered more mixed reviews. The single received a nomination for Best Female Pop Vocal Performance at the 36th Annual Grammy Awards. It accumulated significant airplay across American adult contemporary, urban contemporary, and contemporary hit radio stations and broke the record for the largest airplay audience in a single week. "Dreamlover" topped the Billboard Hot 100 Singles chart for eight consecutive weeks, becoming Carey's seventh US number-one single. The Recording Industry Association of America certified it platinum. It also topped the charts in Canada and Panama and reached the top ten in Australia, New Zealand, Portugal, and the United Kingdom.

Diane Martel directed the music video for "Dreamlover", which depicts Carey dancing in a field, swimming in a pond, and riding a hot air balloon. American music video channels heavily rotated it, while critics embraced its lighthearted nature. Carey has performed the song on televised programs—such as The Arsenio Hall Show and Top of the Pops—and on many of her concert tours and residencies, including the Music Box Tour (1993). Often ranked high on retrospective lists of her best songs, "Dreamlover" is featured on the compilation albums #1's (1998), Greatest Hits (2001), and #1 to Infinity (2015). David Morales and Brian Alexander Morgan altered the track's composition for remixes.

== Background ==
Columbia Records released Mariah Carey's second studio album, Emotions, in 1991. Its singles—"Emotions", "Can't Let Go", and "Make It Happen"—were successful in the United States. Her label gave her creative control over the production of Emotions, which she lacked on her debut studio album, Mariah Carey (1990). Carey had even more control over her music following the release of her first extended play, MTV Unplugged (1992). For her third studio album, Music Box (1993), she chose to continue collaborating with Walter Afanasieff, David Cole, and Robert Clivillés, and began new working relationships with Babyface and Dave Hall. Her label wanted the record to be more pop-oriented than her previous work to broaden her appeal to a wider audience.

Carey decided to collaborate with Hall for the lead single to Music Box because she liked the work he was doing for Mary J. Blige at the time. She wanted the track to be joyful; although Hall was not accustomed to making such songs, he agreed. The song, titled "Dreamlover", marked the second time Carey incorporated a sampled loop from an older song after "Emotions" (1991). She and Hall listened to several loops before settling on "Blind Alley" (1971) by the Emotions. After the pair had created an instrumental, Carey formulated lyrics over the beat they created. Tommy Mottola, the chief executive officer of Columbia and Carey's fiancé at the time, enjoyed the track that the two had made, but felt that it did not have enough widespread appeal. He consulted producer Walter Afanasieff, who believed that their version of "Dreamlover" was "missing a lot of stuff" and that, although the "spirit was up", it was not "hitting hard enough". Afanasieff reworked the drums, organ and keyboards.

== Composition ==
=== Music and lyrics ===
"Dreamlover" is a pop, R&B, and dance track with new jack swing and hip-hop influences. It derives its groove and drum pattern from the sample of "Blind Alley". Critics said that the sample and Hammond B-3 organ gave the track a vintage sound. Author Tim Chan felt that "Dreamlover" had a stronger "vintage flavor" than Hall's other works of the 1990s. Biographer Marc Shapiro described its production as evoking a 1950s style. Tom Breihan of Stereogum viewed the organ as a 1960s "soul touch" and the drums as drawn from a 1970s soul record. Critics considered it a radio-friendly composition. David Morales (Note: For more information about his remixes, see § "Dreamlover" (Def Club Mix).) and Brian Alexander Morgan altered the composition of "Dreamlover" for remixes.

"Dreamlover"
Critics regarded Carey's vocal performance on "Dreamlover" as subdued.

The lyrics portray the narrator as longing for an ideal partner who can offer her lasting love: "Dreamlover, come rescue me / Take me up, take me down / Take me anywhere you want to baby now". Commentators interpreted the song as her tribute to Mottola. In the second verse, she references past failed relationships and hopes that her ideal partner will not disappoint her: "I don't want another pretender to disillusion me one more time / Whispering words of forever, playing with my mind". PC Muñoz, writing for PopMatters, interpreted the lines as a "mix of innocence and very grown-up cynicism and world-weariness".

According to official sheet music published by Hal Leonard, "Dreamlover" has a moderate tempo of 100 beats per minute. It is structured in verse–chorus form and built on a repeating Fmaj_{7}–Gm_{7}–Fmaj_{7}–Gm_{7} chord progression. The track runs for three minutes and fifty-three seconds. Bob Ross, Jim Caruana, Kirk Yano, and Dana Jon Chappelle engineered the song at Right Track Recording in New York City; Chappelle handled lead-vocal engineering. It was mixed by Mick Guzauski in Sony Music Studios in New York City and mastered by Bob Ludwig at Gateway in Portland, Maine. "Dreamlover" features synthesizer and rhythm programming by Hall, additional keyboards, synthesizer, rhythm programming, and organ by Afanasieff, and programming by Gary Cirimelli and Ren Klyce.

Carey's vocal range on "Dreamlover" spans three octaves and seven semitones, from the low note of F_{3} to the high note of C_{7}. Her vocals are multitracked feature and delivered via cooing. She employs her whistle register to introduce the first verse of "Dreamlover" and reprises it to whistle the melody near the song's conclusion. Writing for The Village Voice, Chuck Eddy compared these notes and the track's wordless, repeated "doo" hook to Minnie Riperton's 1974 song "Lovin' You". The song ends with an a cappella tagline. Critics described her vocal performance as subdued. Shapiro described her voice as sounding "perpetually happy" and likened it to that of a little girl; Newsday's Wayne Robbins thought that it evoked the Motown and Philadelphia soul singing styles Carey heard while growing up.

=== "Dreamlover" (Def Club Mix) ===
The original "Dreamlover": It's cute, it's like, "Hold my hand and then let's take a walk in the park" [...] Now, with the remix, you really hear her emotions of what's going on because she's more naked in the track.

— David Morales, who remixed "Dreamlover" (Def Club Mix)

Ten minutes and forty-three seconds in length, "Dreamlover" (Def Club Mix) is a dance, pop, house, and gospel reworking of the original. Morales and Carey remixed the track; Morales provided its percussion and Alec Shantzis and Eric Kupper programmed the keyboards. Carey re-recorded her vocals for the track—an uncommon practice for pop remixes at the time, when it was more common to speed up the original lead vocals. Her falsetto vocals are huskier and lower-pitched than on the original. Commentators regarded the Def Club Mix as effectively a new song, in which the original's girlishness was substituted for a more sensual tone; (Note: Attributed to Cliff Joannou of Rolling Stone, Tom Breihan of Stereogum, Tim Chan in Why Mariah Carey Matters (2023), and Sal Cinquemani of Slant Magazine.) Chan described it as Carey reimagining herself as a femme fatale.

"Dreamlover" (Def Club Mix) opens with echoing electronic beats accompanied by syncopated ad-libs that shift in pitch. About six minutes in, Morales introduces a series of sound effects resembling explosions, after which the arrangement develops into a slower section. It then moves toward a gospel–house breakdown, which is led by Carey's whistle register. Carey's backing vocalists Kelly Price, Melonie Daniels, and Shanrae Price join her nine minutes into the track.

== Release ==
Columbia Records issued "Dreamlover" as the lead single from Music Box on July 27, 1993. It was first distributed to retailers as a 7-inch vinyl single, cassette single, and CD single, with "Do You Think of Me" as the B-side. The latter is a sentimental ballad in which the narrator wonders whether her former lover still thinks of her at night. Carey did not include "Do You Think of Me" on an album until its appearance on The Rarities (2020). The Gavin Report reported on July 30 that Columbia sent a 28-second teaser of "Dreamlover" to radio programmers. The full-length recording was quickly distributed to some stations after it leaked to radio. The label officially serviced the single to adult contemporary, urban contemporary, and contemporary hit radio stations on August 2.

Columbia released "Dreamlover" in cassette maxi, maxi CD, and 12-inch vinyl formats in August. The label issued Music Box on August 31, 1993; "Dreamlover" is the opener of the ten-track album. In Japan, Sony Music Japan sold the single as a mini CD from September 9, 1993, again including "Do You Think of Me". As well as "Do You Think of Me", European maxi-single and UK single editions of "Dreamlover" also feature a live recording of "Someday" from her 1992 extended play, MTV Unplugged. "Dreamlover" has been included on three of Carey's compilation albums: #1's (1998), Greatest Hits (2001), and #1 to Infinity (2015). Columbia and Legacy Recordings released a digital extended play as part of the MC30 promotional campaign marking three decades of Carey's career on August 7, 2020.

== Critical reception ==
Professional ratings
Review scores
Source	Rating
AllMusic	3/5 stars
Stereogum	8/10
Sunday Sun	7/10

Music critics gave "Dreamlover" mostly positive reviews. They considered it the best (Note: Attributed to Rick de Yampert of The Daytona Beach News-Journal and Andrew Hampp of Billboard) or one of the best tracks on Music Box (Note: Attributed to People, Roger Catlin of the Hartford Courant, Steve Fordan of The Florida Times-Union, and Karla Price of the Springfield News-Leader) and regarded it as a standout from most of the album's other tracks, which they judged to be weak. (Note: Attributed to Rick de Yampert of The Daytona Beach News-Journal, People, Roger Catlin of the Hartford Courant, and Karla Price of the Springfield News-Leader) The song has been ranked highly in retrospective rankings of Carey's work. On lists of her best singles, "Dreamlover" was placed number seven (The Guardian), number six (Cleveland.com), and number two (Vulture); Billboard ranked it eighth among her best songs.

Critics were divided over Carey's restrained vocals on "Dreamlover". Cash Box called them seductive and Music Week felt that they demonstrated that sometimes "less is more". David Browne argued in Entertainment Weekly that they left Carey merely singing on the track, "los[ing] herself". Breihan suggested the style was deliberate, as the song was not "specifically built to showcase [her] voice". Carey's songwriting attracted mixed opinions as well, some critics deeming it simple or formulaic. (Note: Attributed to Sal Cinquemani of Slant Magazine, David Browne of Entertainment Weekly, and Mike Duffy of New York Daily News) Cinquemani thought that this was due to Carey's limited creative control at the time. Browne remarked that its lyricism made "Hallmark verses seem like Proust". Joel Selvin of the San Francisco Chronicle and Barbara Jaeger of The Record opined that "Dreamlover" demonstrated Carey's improving songwriting ability.

Reviewers enjoyed the song's production. They regarded "Dreamlover" as a breezy, fun, and "girlish" composition and praised both the song and its hook as catchy. (Note: Attributed to Lynn Saxberg of The Ottawa Citizen, Mike Joyce of The Washington Post, PC Muñoz of PopMatters, and Andrew Hampp of Billboard) Tom Moon of The Philadelphia Inquirer judged it to be more adventurous than Carey's previous works and Ashley Carter of The Times believed it could appeal to older listeners. Biographer Chris Nickson regarded the composition as one of Carey's best and thought it was reminiscent of "Groovin'" (1967) by the Young Rascals. In Newsday, Wayne Robbins opined that the electric-organ riffs contrasted effectively with the synthesizers; Kim Willis of the Clarion-Ledger felt that the organ did not stand out well from the other instruments. Nominated for Best Female Pop Vocal Performance at the 36th Annual Grammy Awards, it lost to Whitney Houston's "I Will Always Love You".

Music critics gave "Dreamlover" (Def Club Mix) positive reviews. Joannou wrote in Rolling Stone that it redefined the concept of a dance remix and foreshadowed the trajectory of Carey's career that began with "Honey" (1997). Chan believed that "Dreamlover" (Def Club Mix) established Morales as someone who could "bring out a hint of the surreal" in Carey. Breihan said that it displayed that she could have been an "absolute monster of a house diva". It placed second on Slant Magazine's list of Carey's best remixes.

== Commercial performance ==
After only a partial week of airplay, "Dreamlover" entered the Billboard Hot 100 Singles chart dated August 7, 1993, at number 40. It was the week's highest debut and Carey's fourth single to debut in the top 40. The following week, the single registered the chart's largest increase, rising to number thirteen. In its sixth week on the Hot 100, "Dreamlover" became Carey's seventh US number-one single after replacing UB40's "Can't Help Falling in Love" on the chart dated September 11, 1993. Billboard predicted that it would have a lengthy run atop the Hot 100 because none of the other top-ten songs considered potential challengers had comparable airplay. The song spent eight consecutive weeks at number one on the chart and was displaced by Meat Loaf's "I'd Do Anything for Love (But I Won't Do That)". "Dreamlover" remained on the Hot 100 for twenty-nine weeks and was Carey's seventh best-performing song on the chart as of 2018. The song ranked eighth on the year-end Hot 100 chart of 1993.

"Dreamlover" experienced success across multiple radio formats in the United States. It topped the contemporary hit radio charts published by Billboard, the Gavin Report, and Radio & Records; the urban contemporary charts issued by the Gavin Report and Radio & Records; and the adult contemporary chart distributed by Radio & Records. (Note: Cited to multiple sources:) The single broke the record for the biggest airplay audience in a single week, surpassing Whitney Houston's "I Will Always Love You" (1992). It reached an estimated audience of 89 million at its weekly peak in late September 1993, as measured by Billboard's Broadcast Data Systems. "Dreamlover" held the record for three years until it was surpassed by Donna Lewis's "I Love You Always Forever" in 1996. It became Carey's first song to be awarded a platinum certification from the Recording Industry Association of America, which denotes one million certified units. One of her best-selling physical singles, "Dreamlover" sold over 935,000 units domestically as of 2014.

In Canada, "Dreamlover" topped both RPM's airplay-based singles chart and The Record's sales-based singles chart. The single also reached number one on The Record's contemporary hit radio chart, and number two and six on RPM's adult contemporary and dance/urban radio charts, respectively. In Oceania, it peaked at numbers two and seven on the respective singles charts of New Zealand and Australia. The Australian Recording Industry Association awarded "Dreamlover" a six-times platinum certification, and the Recording Industry Association of New Zealand and Music Canada both certified it gold. In Europe, the song reached number two in Portugal; numbers eight and nine on the Netherlands' Top 40 all-format chart and its Top 100 physical singles chart, respectively; and number nine in the United Kingdom, where it became one of Carey's best-selling singles. It also charted in Finland, France, Germany, Iceland, Ireland, Lithuania, Sweden, and Switzerland. (Note: Cited to multiple sources:)

== Music video and live performances ==
Diane Martel directed the music video for "Dreamlover", the first of multiple collaborations between her and Carey. The video was filmed in Copake, New York, in June 1993. It depicts Carey swimming in a pool by a waterfall with her dog Jack, lying in a field of wildflowers, and singing in front of a group of hip-hop dancers and from a hot air balloon. Chan described her outfit in the video as evoking a girl-next-door persona; she wears a black-and-white flannel shirt tied above her midriff. The video received heavy rotation on several music video channels in the United States. As measured by Broadcast Data Systems, it topped the weekly airplay charts published by the television channels VH1 and BET and reached the top ten on MTV. Critics embraced the video's lighthearted nature and felt it reflected the song's bliss. (Note: Attributed to Tom Breihan of Stereogum, Andrew Chan in Why Mariah Carey Matters, and Chris Nickson in Mariah Carey Revisited: Her Story)

Carey has performed "Dreamlover" on several occasions. (Note: This is not a exhaustive list of her performances, only those reported by reliable sources; others may be included in List of Mariah Carey live performances § Televised performances.) In 1993, she promoted it through The Arsenio Hall Show; Rolling Stone writers felt that the performance was an example of her voice resonating more when conveying infatuation. That same year, she performed "Dreamlover"—alongside other songs from Music Box and some of her older songs—at New York's Proctor's Theatre in July 1993, captured in the one-hour television special Here Is Mariah Carey. Carey promoted the song to a British audience through Top of the Pops in August 1993. In October 1995, she performed "Dreamlover" during a concert at Madison Square Garden in New York City. It was included on her video album Fantasy: Mariah Carey at Madison Square Garden in 1996. In December 1999, she filmed The Mariah Carey Homecoming Special at her former high school in Huntington, New York, to promote her album Rainbow; the special included a performance of "Dreamlover".

"Dreamlover" became a staple of Carey's concert tours. She has sung it on most of her world tours: the Music Box Tour (1993), Daydream World Tour (1996), Butterfly World Tour (1998), Rainbow World Tour (2000), Charmbracelet World Tour (2003–2004), Adventures of Mimi (2006), and Caution World Tour (2019). Her performance of the song at the Tokyo Dome during the Daydream World Tour is included on her compilation album The Rarities (2020). Carey has performed the song for two of her concert residencies in Las Vegas, #1 to Infinity (2015–2017) and the Celebration of Mimi (2024–2025).

== Track listing and formats ==
- CD single 1, cassette single 1, 7-inch single, mini CD single
- 1. "Dreamlover" – 3:53
- 2. "Do You Think of Me" – 4:46
- CD single 2, CD maxi-single 1

3. "Someday" – 3:57

- CD maxi-single 2
- 2. "Dreamlover" (Def Club Mix) – 10:43
- 3. "Dreamlover" (Eclipse Dub) – 4:52
- CD maxi-single 3
- 2. "Dreamlover" (Def Club Mix) – 10:43
- 3. "Dreamlover" (Def Instrumental) – 6:20
- 4. "Dreamlover" (USA Love Dub) – 7:10
- 5. "Dreamlover" (Eclipse Dub) – 4:52
- 6. "Dreamlover" (Def Tribal Mix) – 6:41
- Cassette single 2
- A1. "Dreamlover" (Theo's Club Joint) – 3:53
- A2. "Dreamlover" (Bam Jam Soul) – 4:27
- A3. "Dreamlover" (Def Club Mix Edit) – 4:04
- A4. "Dreamlover" (LP Version) – 3:55
- B1. "Dreamlover" (Theo's Club Joint) – 3:53
- B2. "Dreamlover" (Bam Jam Soul) – 4:27
- B3. "Dreamlover" (Def Club Mix Edit) – 4:04
- B4. "Dreamlover" (LP Version) – 3:55
- 12-inch single 1
- A1. "Dreamlover" (Def Club Mix) – 10:43
- A2. "Dreamlover" (Eclipse Dub) – 4:52
- B1. "Dreamlover" – 3:53
- B2. "Do You Think of Me" – 4:46
- 12-inch single 2, cassette maxi single
- A2. "Dreamlover" (Def Instrumental) – 6:20
- B1. "Dreamlover" (USA Love Dub) – 7:10
- B2. "Dreamlover" (Eclipse Dub) – 4:52
- B3. "Dreamlover" (Def Tribal Mix) – 6:41
- Digital EP
- 1. "Dreamlover" (Def Club Mix Edit) – 4:04
- 2. "Dreamlover" (Def Club Mix) – 10:46
- 3. "Dreamlover" (Def Club Mix Edit 2005) – 4:23
- 4. "Dreamlover" (Def Tribal Mix) – 6:42
- 5. "Dreamlover" (Eclipse Dub) – 4:53
- 6. "Dreamlover" (USA Love Dub) – 7:11
- 7. "Dreamlover" (Theo's Joint Club) – 4:35
- 8. "Dreamlover" (Bam Jam Soul) – 4:27
- 9. "Dreamlover" (Def Instrumental) – 6:22
- 10. "Dreamlover" (Live at Madison Square Garden – October 1995) – 3:54
- 11. "Dreamlover" (Live at Proctor's Theater, NY – 1993) – 3:57

== Credits and personnel ==
Credits adapted from the Music Box liner notes

Locations

- Recorded at Right Track Studios (New York City)
- Mixed at Sony Music Studios (New York City)

Personnel

- Mariah Carey – arranger, lead vocals, lyrics, music, producer
- Dave Hall – music, producer, programming, synthesizer
- Walter Afanasieff – music, organ, producer, lyrics
- Bob Ross – engineering
- Ren Klyce – programming
- Mick Guzauski – mixing
- Bob Ludwig – mastering

== Charts ==
=== Weekly charts ===
Chart (1993)	Peak position
Australia (ARIA)	7
Belgium (Ultratop 50 Flanders)	20
Canada Retail Singles (The Record)	1
Canada Contemporary Hit Radio (The Record)	1
Canada Top Singles (RPM)	1
Canada Adult Contemporary (RPM)	2
Canada Dance/Urban (RPM)	6
Europe (Eurochart Hot 100)	15
Europe (European AC Radio)	2
Europe (European Dance Radio)	1
Europe (European Hit Radio)	1
Finland (Suomen virallinen lista)	25
France (SNEP)	49
Germany (GfK)	39
Iceland (Íslenski Listinn Topp 40)	17
Ireland (IRMA)	24
Israel (Israeli Singles Chart)	7
Lithuania (M-1)	17
Netherlands (Dutch Top 40)	8
Netherlands (Single Top 100)	9
New Zealand (Recorded Music NZ)	2
Panama (UPI)	1
Portugal (AFP)	2
Sweden (Sverigetopplistan)	31
Switzerland (Schweizer Hitparade)	13
UK Singles (Official Charts)	9
UK Airplay (Music Week)	2
UK Dance (Music Week) Import-only single	37
UK Club Chart (Music Week) Morales Remix	7
US Hot 100 Singles (Billboard)	1
US Hot Adult Contemporary (Billboard)	2
US Hot Dance Music Club Play (Billboard)	1
US Hot Dance Music Maxi-Singles Sales (Billboard)	3
US Hot R&B Singles (Billboard)	2
US Top 40/Mainstream (Billboard)	1
US Top 40/Rhythm-Crossover (Billboard)	1
US Cash Box Top 100	1
US Top 100 R&B Singles (Cash Box)	1
US Adult Contemporary (Gavin Report)	2
US Top 40 (Gavin Report)	1
US Urban (Gavin Report)	1
US Adult Contemporary (Radio & Records)	1
US Contemporary Hit Radio (Radio & Records)	1
US Urban Contemporary (Radio & Records)	1

Chart (2006)	Peak position
UK Dance (Official Charts)	28

=== Year-end charts ===
Chart (1993)	Position
Australia (ARIA)	42
Brazil (Brazilian Radio Airplay)	3
Canada Retail Singles (The Record)	3
Canada Top Singles (RPM)	2
Canada Adult Contemporary (RPM)	12
Canada Dance/Urban (RPM)	43
Europe (European Dance Radio)	2
Europe (European Hit Radio)	7
Netherlands (Dutch Top 40)	45
Netherlands (Single Top 100)	69
New Zealand (RIANZ)	13
UK Singles (OCC)	71
UK Airplay (Music Week)	14
UK Club Chart (Music Week)	89
US Billboard Hot 100	8
US Adult Contemporary (Billboard)	16
US Hot R&B Singles (Billboard)	20
US Maxi-Singles Sales (Billboard)	9
US Cash Box Top 100	15
US Adult Contemporary (Radio & Records)	20
US Contemporary Hit Radio (Radio & Records)	1
US Urban (Radio & Records)	35

Chart (1994)	Position
US Adult Contemporary (Billboard)	37

=== Decade-end charts ===
Chart (1990–1999)	Position
Canada (Nielsen SoundScan)	53
US Billboard Hot 100	20

== Certifications and sales ==
Region	Certification	Certified units/sales
Australia (ARIA)	6× Platinum	420,000^{‡}
Canada (Music Canada)	Gold	40,000^{‡}
New Zealand (RMNZ)	Gold	15,000^{‡}
United Kingdom	—	150,000 (Note: UK sales as of c. 2010–2011)
United States (RIAA)	Platinum	935,000 (Note: US sales as of February 2014)
^{‡} Sales+streaming figures based on certification alone.

== Release history ==
Release dates and formats for "Dreamlover"
Region	Date	Format(s)	Label(s)	Ref.
United States	July 27, 1993	7-inch vinyl; cassette; CD	Columbia	
United States	August 2, 1993	Radio airplay	Columbia	
Australia	August 9, 1993	Cassette; CD	Columbia	
United Kingdom	August 9, 1993	12-inch vinyl; cassette; CD	Columbia	
Japan	August 21, 1993	Mini CD	Sony Music Japan	
Canada	September 21, 1993	Maxi CD	Columbia	
Various	August 7, 2020	EP	Columbia; Legacy	

== Sources ==
- Anon. (2007). Mariah Carey Anthology (EPUB ed.). Hal Leonard. ISBN 9781458464415.
- Bronson, Fred (2003). The Billboard Book of Number 1 Hits. Billboard Books. ISBN 0-8230-7677-6.
- Carey, Mariah (2020). The Meaning of Mariah Carey. Pan Macmillan. ISBN 978-1-76098-208-9.
- Chan, Andrew (2023). Why Mariah Carey Matters. Music Matters. University of Texas Press. ISBN 978-1-4773-2507-0.
- Nickson, Chris (1998). Mariah Carey Revisited: Her Story. St. Martin's Press. ISBN 978-0-312-19512-0.
- Shapiro, Marc (2001). Mariah Carey: The Unauthorized Biography. ECW Press. ISBN 1-55490-444-7.
