= Without You (Mariah Carey recording) =

- Standard cover art; most non-UK European releases omit "Never Forget You" on the front cover

Single by Mariah Carey

from the album Music Box
- A-side: "Never Forget You" (double A-side)
- Released: January 21, 1994
- Studio: Right Track Recording (New York City); Record Plant (Sausalito, California)
- Genre: Pop; R&B
- Length: 3:36
- Label: Columbia
- Songwriters: Pete Ham; Tom Evans
- Producers: Mariah Carey; Walter Afanasieff

Mariah Carey singles chronology
| "Hero" (1993) | "Without You" (1994) | "Never Forget You" (1994) |

Music video
- "Without You" on YouTube

"Without You" is a song recorded by American singer-songwriter Mariah Carey. It is a cover of the Badfinger song based on the version by Harry Nilsson and was released as the third single from her third studio album Music Box (1993) in the first quarter of 1994, with its US release date of January 21, 1994 by Columbia Records falling a week after Nilsson died of a heart attack on January 15. While she had heard Nilsson's version as a very young girl, Carey decided to remake his hit based on a chance hearing it in the midst of recording Music Box: "I heard that song in a restaurant and just knew it would be a huge international hit" recalls Carey.

In the United States, "Without You" was promoted as a double A-side with "Never Forget You". The song eventually peaked at number three on the US Billboard Hot 100, becoming Carey's eleventh top-ten single. "Without You" had particular success in Europe, where it reached the top of the singles charts in over ten countries, including the United Kingdom. Due to its popularity overseas, "Without You" was later included on some non-US pressings of her compilation albums #1's (1998) and #1 to Infinity (2015), and her 2001 compilation, Greatest Hits. "Without You" was also included on her 2008 compilation The Ballads.

== Release ==
"Without You" was released on January 21, 1994 in the United States, where Columbia distributed seven-inch vinyls, twelve-inch vinyls, cassettes, maxi cassettes, CDs, and maxi CD singles. The label issued it in the United Kingdom on February 7 as a seven-inch vinyl, cassette, and CD. RCA re-released Nilsson's version on the same day. Columbia issued a second UK CD a week later. Sony Music Japan released a mini CD in that country on February 21.

== Critical reception ==
Professional ratings
Review scores
| Source | Rating |
|---|---|
| Entertainment Weekly | B+ |
| Stereogum | 5/10 |

Scottish Aberdeen Press and Journal described the song as "inspirational". Larry Flick from Billboard magazine wrote, "Carey offers a faithful rendition of the eternally sweet pop ballad", adding that the "song's arrangement is infused with all the romance and drama it requires, with Carey rising above the mix with a vocal that is more heartfelt and gutsy than note-scaling and acrobatic." Troy J. Augusto from Cash Box named it Pick of the Week, stating that "Carey has thankfully learned the important difference between dynamic control and sonic overkill, never more evident than here. Her recent short concert tour revealed Mariah to be an anxious, under-confident live performer, but this song, with its accompanying tale of her own childhood loneliness made "Without You" the show's climax. Expect a long chart life."

David Browne of Entertainment Weekly called Carey's cover a "by-the-numbers remake of Nilsson's melodramatic 1972 hit." John Kilgo from The Network Forty concluded that "exhibiting her dynamic vocal range with powerful emotion, Mariah scores again with her rendition of Harry Nilsson's chart topper." A reviewer from People Magazine noted that "she takes on a sensuality—in a lower register—that is often sacrificed for her "look Ma, no hands" vocal fireworks." In a 2015 retrospective review, Pop Rescue stated that "Without You" gives the singer "a ton of space to really let her vocals reach wherever they want to", adding it as "an epic track, and a fantastic showcase of her vocals." Stephen Holden of Rolling Stone called it the "likeliest contender" for ballads like "I Will Always Love You", praising how Carey "dips into her lower register and is accompanied by backup singers (including herself) magnified to sound like a mighty gospel chorus." Mike Joyce from The Washington Post stated, "Unlike Nilsson, Carey has the pipes to pull off this anguished pop aria".

== Chart performance ==
"Without You" reached number three on the US Billboard Hot 100 for six weeks, remaining in the top 40 for 21 weeks and on the chart for 23 weeks. It was certified platinum by the Recording Industry Association of America (RIAA) and sold 600,000 copies domestically. It was ranked 16 on the Hot 100 1994 year-end charts. In Canada, it peaked at number four.

"Without You" became at the time Carey's biggest hit across Europe. In the United Kingdom, where Carey had yet to score a number one hit, "Without You" made its UK chart debut at number one where it remained for four weeks in total, and later ended as the 7th best-selling single of 1994 in the United Kingdom. Additionally, Carey achieved a "Chart Double" in the UK, with both "Without You" and the album Music Box holding the top spot at the same time. In the UK, "Without You" was Carey's only number-one solo hit (seven years later, she topped the charts with her collaboration with Westlife: "Against All Odds" in 2000), until Carey scored a second number-one solo hit with "All I Want for Christmas Is You" in 2020. "Without You" was certified platinum in the UK with combined sales and streams of 600,000. It was a runaway success across Europe, in which it topped the European Hot 100 Singles chart for two weeks. "Without You" reached number one for ten weeks in Switzerland; eight weeks in Austria and Sweden; seven weeks in Belgium; five weeks in Ireland and the Netherlands; four weeks in Germany and Iceland; and two weeks in Scotland, where Carey's success had previously been limited. The song also peaked at number two in France and Denmark; at number three in Norway; and at number four in Lithuania. "Without You" was certified platinum in Germany and Austria by International Federation of the Phonographic Industry (IFPI) and gold in France by the Syndicat National de l'Édition Phonographique (SNEP). "Without You" also found success in Latin America, peaking at number two in Panama; and at number seven in Chile.

Being a number-three hit for Carey in Australia, "Without You" topped the charts in New Zealand for one week. It was certified 2× platinum in Australia by Australian Recording Industry Association (ARIA) and gold in New Zealand by Recording Industry Association of New Zealand (RIANZ).

== Track listing ==
- Worldwide CD single
1. "Without You" – 3:38
2. "Never Forget You" – 3:45
- European maxi-CD single #1
1. "Without You" – 3:38
2. "Never Forget You" – 3:45
3. "Dreamlover (live from Here Is Mariah Carey)" – 4:09
- European maxi-CD single #2
1. "Without You" – 3:38
2. "Vision of Love" – 3:28
3. "I'll Be There" (Featuring Trey Lorenz) – 4:28
4. "Love Takes Time" – 3:48

== Credits ==
Credits adapted from the liner notes of Music Box.

Locations

- Recorded at Right Track Recording (New York City); additional recording at Record Plant (Sausalito, California)
- Mixed at Sony Music Studios (New York City)
- Mastered at Gateway Mastering Studios (Portland, Maine)

Personnel

- Walter Afanasieff – arranger, keyboards, producer, rhythm programming, Synclavier acoustic guitar, synthesizers, synth bass
- Mariah Carey – arranger, background vocals, lead vocals, producer
- Jim Caruana – second engineering
- Dana Jon Chappelle – engineering
- Gary Cirimelli – Macintosh programming, Synclavier programming
- Melonie Daniels – background vocals
- Tom Evans – songwriter
- Pete Ham – songwriter
- Ren Klyce – Akai programming, Synclavier programming
- Manny LaCarrubba – assistant engineering
- Bob Ludwig – mastering
- Kent Matcke – second engineering
- Kelly Price – background vocals
- Shanrae Price – background vocals

== Charts ==
=== Weekly charts ===
| Chart (1994) | Peak position |
|---|---|
| Australia (ARIA) | 3 |
| Austria (Ö3 Austria Top 40) | 1 |
| Belgium (Ultratop 50 Flanders) | 1 |
| Canada Top Singles (RPM) | 4 |
| Canada Adult Contemporary (RPM) | 3 |
| Canada Retail Singles (The Record) | 2 |
| Canada Contemporary Hit Radio (The Record) | 3 |
| Canada Pop Adult (The Record) | 1 |
| Chile (UPI) | 7 |
| Denmark (Tracklisten) | 2 |
| Europe (Eurochart Hot 100) | 1 |
| Europe (European AC Top 25) | 3 |
| Europe (European Hit Radio) | 2 |
| Finland (Suomen virallinen lista) | 17 |
| France (SNEP) | 2 |
| Germany (GfK) | 1 |
| Iceland (Íslenski Listinn Topp 40) | 1 |
| Ireland (IRMA) | 1 |
| Israel (Israeli Singles Chart) | 1 |
| Lithuania (M-1) | 4 |
| Netherlands (Dutch Top 40) | 1 |
| Netherlands (Single Top 100) | 1 |
| New Zealand (Recorded Music NZ) | 1 |
| Norway (VG-lista) | 3 |
| Panama (UPI) | 2 |
| Scottish Singles Sales (Official Charts) | 1 |
| Sweden (Sverigetopplistan) | 1 |
| Switzerland (Schweizer Hitparade) | 1 |
| UK Singles (Official Charts) | 1 |
| UK Airplay (Music Week) | 1 |
| US Hot 100 Singles (Billboard) with "Never Forget You" | 3 |
| US Hot Adult Contemporary (Billboard) | 4 |
| US Hot R&B Singles (Billboard) with "Never Forget You" | 7 |
| US Top 40/Mainstream (Billboard) | 2 |
| US Top 40/Rhythm-Crossover (Billboard) | 9 |
| US Cash Box Top 100 | 1 |
| US Adult Contemporary (Gavin Report) | 1 |
| US Top 40 (Gavin Report) | 1 |
| US Adult Contemporary (Radio & Records) | 1 |
| US Contemporary Hit Radio (Radio & Records) | 2 |

| Chart (2010–2012) | Peak position |
|---|---|
| France (SNEP) | 113 |
| South Korea International (Gaon) | 83 |

=== Year-end charts ===
| Chart (1994) | Position |
|---|---|
| Australia (ARIA) | 16 |
| Austria (Ö3 Austria Top 40) | 1 |
| Belgium (Ultratop) | 3 |
| Brazil (Brazilian Radio Airplay) | 10 |
| Canada Top Singles (RPM) | 27 |
| Canada Adult Contemporary (RPM) | 31 |
| Canada Retail Singles (The Record) | 10 |
| Europe (Eurochart Hot 100) | 2 |
| Europe (European AC Top 25) | 8 |
| Europe (European Hit Radio) | 10 |
| France (SNEP) | 8 |
| Germany (Media Control) | 1 |
| Iceland (Íslenski Listinn Topp 40) | 3 |
| Israel (Israeli Singles Chart) | 2 |
| Netherlands (Dutch Top 40) | 3 |
| Netherlands (Single Top 100) | 6 |
| New Zealand (RIANZ) | 21 |
| Norway Spring Period (VG-lista) | 6 |
| Sweden (Topplistan) | 4 |
| Switzerland (Schweizer Hitparade) | 1 |
| UK Singles (OCC) | 7 |
| UK Airplay (Music Week) | 16 |
| US Billboard Hot 100 with "Never Forget You" | 16 |
| US Adult Contemporary (Billboard) | 16 |
| US Hot R&B Singles (Billboard) with "Never Forget You" | 61 |
| US Cash Box Top 100 | 15 |
| US Adult Contemporary (Radio & Records) | 10 |
| US Contemporary Hit Radio (Radio & Records) | 17 |

=== Decade-end charts ===
| Chart (1990–1999) | Position |
|---|---|
| Austria (Ö3 Austria Top 40) | 23 |
| Belgium (Ultratop 50 Flanders) | 4 |
| France (SNEP) | 114 |
| Netherlands (Dutch Top 40) | 36 |

=== All-time charts ===
| Chart | Position |
|---|---|
| Belgium (Ultratop 50 Flanders) | 26 |

== Certifications and sales ==
Certifications and sales for "Without You"
| Region | Certification | Certified units/sales |
|---|---|---|
| Australia (ARIA) | 2× Platinum | 140,000^{‡} |
| Austria (IFPI Austria) | Platinum | 50,000^{*} |
| Canada (Music Canada) | Gold | 40,000^{‡} |
| Denmark (IFPI Danmark) | Gold | 45,000^{‡} |
| France (SNEP) | Gold | 250,000^{*} |
| Germany (BVMI) | Platinum | 500,000^{^} |
| Netherlands (NVPI) | Platinum | 75,000^{^} |
| New Zealand (RMNZ) | Gold | 15,000^{‡} |
| South Korea (Gaon) | — | 197,166 |
| Spain (Promusicae) | Gold | 30,000^{‡} |
| Switzerland (IFPI Switzerland) | Gold | 25,000^{^} |
| United Kingdom (BPI) | Platinum | 600,000^{‡} |
| United States (RIAA) | Platinum | 1,000,000^{‡} |
^{*} Sales figures based on certification alone.^{^} Shipments figures based on certification alone.^{‡} Sales+streaming figures based on certification alone.

== Release history ==
Release history
| Region | Date | Label | Format | Cat. No. | Ref. |
|---|---|---|---|---|---|
| United Kingdom | February 7, 1994 | Columbia | 7-inch; Cassette; CD1 | 6599197; 6599194; 6599192 | |
| United Kingdom | February 14, 1994 | Columbia | CD2 | 6599195 | |
