= Anytime You Need a Friend =

Single by Mariah Carey

from the album Music Box
- B-side: "Music Box"
- Released: May 24, 1994
- Studio: Right Track Studios (New York City, New York)
- Genre: Gospel; pop; R&B
- Length: 4:26
- Label: Columbia
- Composers: Mariah Carey; Walter Afanasieff
- Lyricist: Mariah Carey
- Producers: Mariah Carey; Walter Afanasieff

Mariah Carey singles chronology
"Never Forget You" (1994)	"Anytime You Need a Friend" (1994)	"Endless Love" (1994)

Music video
- "Anytime You Need a Friend" on YouTube

"Anytime You Need a Friend" is a song by American singer-songwriter Mariah Carey. She and Walter Afanasieff wrote and produced the track for her third studio album, Music Box (1993). It was released on May 24, 1994, through Columbia Records, as the fifth and final single from the album. The song is influenced by pop, R&B and gospel genres. While the album focused heavily on pop oriented and radio friendly material, "Anytime You Need a Friend" deviated from the formula, finishing as the only gospel-infused song on Music Box. Lyrically, the song's protagonist tells her love interest that anytime he may need a friend, she will be there unconditionally for him. Throughout the song's bridge and climax, critics noted the lyrics altering from those of a friend, to those of a lover.

The song received acclaim from music critics, many of whom praised Carey's large spanning vocal range, as well as its gospel influence which they felt was missing on most of Music Box. "Anytime You Need a Friend" achieved strong worldwide chart positions, topping the charts in Finland and Israel, and reaching the top-ten in Canada, Iceland, the Netherlands, New Zealand, Panama, and the United Kingdom. It also charted within the top 20 in Australia, Belgium, France, Ireland, New Zealand, Scotland, and Switzerland. In the United States, it became her lowest-charting single on the Billboard Hot 100, peaking at number 12.

Carey performed "Anytime You Need a Friend" live on several televised talk and award shows around the world, including the Late Show with David Letterman, the British music chart program Top of the Pops and German entertainment show Wetten, dass..? Additionally, the song served as a closing number on Carey's Music Box Tour and Daydream World Tour, and was featured on her compilation albums, Greatest Hits (2001) and The Ballads (2008). Although several remixes were commissioned for the song, the C+C remix became the most notable, being produced by C+C Music Factory's David Cole and Robert Clivillés, and the first of Carey's remixes to feature her on production credits.

The song's music video was filmed by Danielle Federici, in New York during the summer of 1994. The video was filmed in black-and-white fashion, and features Carey's first image makeover, where she appears with a straightened hairstyle for the first time in her career. Additionally, the music video showcases scenes of Carey singing by a large church choir in a foyer, as well as several people, ranging from a small child to an elderly man, who are alone and depressed. As the video progresses, the child and man are befriended after brief interludes and prayers to God. The song's C+C remix also features its own music video, displaying behind the scenes footage of Carey and her staff enjoying themselves during the original video's filming.

== Background and recording ==
For her third studio effort, Columbia Records decided to market Carey in a similar fashion to that of her debut, only having her produce a more commercial and radio-friendly album. Their plans were to tone down Carey's vocals, and soften the album's production, leaving a more contemporary pop record. Agreeing to the change, Carey and Afanasieff began writing and recording material for her third studio effort, Music Box (1993). On the album's first track "Dreamlover", Carey worked with Dave Hall throughout the song's entire production. To help with some of the song's arrangements, Mottola enrolled the help of Walter Afanasieff, who took on the completed track and transformed it into a more commercial hit. Music Box received mixed critical response from critics, who suggested that in lowering Carey's vocal bombast, her energy level decreased and felt the album had an "absence of passion." The only song that was not subject to the common criticism was "Anytime You Need a Friend," which some called the album's only real glimpse of Carey's upper vocal registers, and one of the only passionate and gospel moments on Music Box. In an interview, Carey described that although the album's main goal was to be more commercial and radio-friendly than her previous release, she felt the need to include at least one song that featured a church choir and traces of the music that influenced her growing up as a child.

== Composition ==
"Anytime You Need a Friend" is a mid-tempo song that draws influence from pop, R&B and gospel musical genres. It has a "moderately slow" tempo of 69 beats per minute. The song was written by Carey and Afanasieff, with production helmed by the pair as well. After the song's bridge, a church choir is introduced and featured throughout its final chorus and climax. Carey's vocals are layered over the background gospel-styled vocals on the final chorus, after which she uses the whistle register to close the song. The song's lyrics describe a relationship the protagonist has with another individual, telling them that anytime they need a friend, she will be there unconditionally.

Throughout the song, the lyrics seemingly show the evolving relationship between the couple. Carey sings Anytime you need a friend / I will be here / You'll never be alone again / So don't you fear / Even if you're miles away / I'm by your side / So don't you ever be lonely / Love will make it alright, which hints at a current friendship where more still uncovered emotions are present. Author Chris Nickson explains on the song's switch in relationship, as the lyrics change to If you just believe in me / I will love you endlessly / Take my hand / Take me into your heart / I'll be there forever baby / I won't let go / I'll never let go. The protagonist is willing to accept the relationship as only a friend, but tells her partner that no matter his feelings for her, she loves him and still wishes to be loved by him, something she will never forget or "let go".

== Critical reception ==
"Anytime You Need a Friend" received acclaim from music critics, many of whom praised the song's gospel influence as well as Carey's vocal range. Following the mixed reception to its parent album, Music Box, it was deemed a strong contrast to the album's pop influence. Critics agreed that through lowering Carey's vocal bombast, the album suffered due to lowered passion and energy levels. The song however, was considered the only standout from the album, altering heavily from the pop oriented formula of Music Box. A writer from The Atlanta Journal-Constitution branded it as "the center of the album." J.D. Considine from The Baltimore Sun wrote, "Where another singer might have been tempted to turn 'Anytime You Need a Friend' into a full-blown sanctified sing-out, Carey and producer Walter Afanasieff use the gospel harmonies on the chorus as contrast for Carey's pop soul vocal." Larry Flick from Billboard described the song as "a sweet and spiritual vow of support woven into a melodic pop ballad." He added, "Displaying soulful finesse and earnest warmth, Carey continues to prove her growth as a vocalist, soaring over a grand gospel choir with ease." Troy J. Augusto from Cash Box declared it as "a potent mix of spirituality and faith (long-running themes for Mariah, of course) and radio-driven pop." In 2003, Daily Record named it one of the "World's Greatest First Dance Songs."

While calling it "undeniably strong", David Browne from Entertainment Weekly gave the song a mixed review, writing "'Anytime You Need a Friend' feature gospel-inflected choirs seemingly intended to demonstrate that Carey has soul — which she doesn't — but they're beautifully arranged, and they serve as a nice counterpoint to Carey's own lapses into show-offy vocal gymnastics." In an article from the Fort Worth Star-Telegram, a writer commented that her vocal range in the song sounds as if it is from a "glass-shattering dimension" and complimented the singer's incorporation of the gospel genre and church choir into the song's climax. Gavin Report stated that "with its serious gospel overtones", it is Carey's "most powerful track to-date." Music & Media wrote, "Her last two singles were both ballads, and with this new one the triptych is fulfilled. She kicks of slowly, then a gospel choir joins in and together they take it to a grand finale." People Magazine noted that she "shines on the gospel-tinged testimonial". Pop Rescue said the gospel choir "works perfectly in contrast to Mariah’s vocals, allowing her to focus on hitting some incredibly high notes with the strength of the choir behind her." A writer from Portland Press Herald called the song one of Carey's "original classics", and felt it earned a place on her compilation album #1's, even though it did not top the Billboard Hot 100. Suraya Attas from The Straits Times described the singer's voice as husky, and felt it "exploited her vocal range to the fullest." Christopher John Farley from Time noted the song as "gospel flavored" and wrote that it "demonstrates Carey's vocal power, although too fleetingly." USA Today critic John T. Jones called it "inspirational", while "Anytime You Need A Friend" won a Broadcast Music, Inc. (BMI) Pop Award and an American Society of Composers, Authors and Publishers (ASCAP) Pop Music Award for the Songwriter Award in 1995.

== Chart performance ==
On the US Billboard Hot 100, "Anytime You Need a Friend" debuted at number 45 on the chart and eventually peaked at number 12, remaining in the top-40 for 18 weeks and on the chart for 21. It was popular on US radio and was ranked number forty-seven on the 1994 Year-End Charts, giving Carey three singles in the top half of the chart. On the Year-End Hot Adult Contemporary Tracks, "Anytime You Need a Friend" finished at number 21 and number 39 on the Hot Dance Music Club Play Singles Year-End Chart. In Canada, the song debuted at number 82 on the Canadian RPM Singles Chart during the week of May 23, 1994. Seven weeks later, the song reached its peak of number five on the singles chart, spending three consecutive weeks at the position and a total of 20 weeks on the chart. On the RPM Year-End Charts, "Anytime You Need a Friend" finished at number 39. On the week dated June 19, 1994, on the Australian Singles Chart, the song entered at number 48. Weeks later, it ascended to its peak position of number 12, where it stayed for one week, and a total of 17 weeks fluctuating inside the singles chart. "Anytime You Need a Friend" was certified gold by the Australian Recording Industry Association (ARIA), denoting shipments of over 35,000 units. On the Dutch Top 40 chart, "Anytime You Need a Friend" reached the number ten position on the singles chart.

In France, the single entered the chart at number 43 during the week of October 29, 1994. After spending one week at its peak position of number 12, the song fluctuated inside the singles chart for a total of 16 weeks. In Germany and Ireland, "Anytime You Need a Friend" reached numbers 31 and 16 on their respective singles charts. On the New Zealand Singles Chart dated June 26, 1994, the song entered the chart at number nine. After spending two weeks at its peak position of number five, and a total of 14 weeks in the singles chart, the song was certified gold by the Recording Industry Association of New Zealand (RIANZ), denoting shipments of over 7,500 units. In Switzerland, "Anytime You Need a Friend" peaked at number 15, however spending 17 weeks fluctuating in the Swiss Singles Chart. On the UK Singles Chart week dated June 18, 1994, the song debuted at number nine. The following week, it reached its peak position of number eight, spending a total of ten weeks in the singles chart. Following a live performance of the song by Eoghan Quigg on the fifth series of the British talent show The X Factor, "Anytime You Need a Friend" re-surged onto the singles chart at number 96 on November 22, 2008. As of 2010, MTV estimates sales of the song in the United Kingdom to be at 100,000 units.

== Remixes ==
"Anytime You Need a Friend" was remixed by David Cole and Robert Clivillés of C+C Music Factory. Although over fifteen various edits and extended mixes were created, for the most part they are based on the "C+C Club Mix." Other variations, extended mixes, and edits include but are not limited to the "All That and More Mix," "Dave's Empty Pass," and the "Boriqua Tribe Mix". Cory Rooney and Mark Morales created a "Soul Convention Mix" and a stringapella for the song. Because of the large number of remixes, two maxi singles were released in the US Carey was given co-producing credit for both the C&C mixes and the Soul Convention/Stringapella, the first time that she had been given producing credit on remixes of her songs. Gregg Shapiro from the Windy City Times complimented the remix, writing "the presence of each improves on the original. They have something new to say; even with the songs that began as dance tracks." Jose F. Promis praises the re-recorded vocals for the C+C remix, writing how the remix found Carey "getting quite gritty and earthy." He concluded his review with "It made for a topnotch dancefloor number, and stands as an excellent example of early- to mid-'90s dance music, not to mention being one of the singer's most compelling, underrated, and forgotten efforts."

On August 7, 2020, along with the celebration of the 30th-anniversary of her debut studio album Mariah Carey (1990), as well as Carey celebrating 30 years of music career, the song was released as a thirteen-track extended play, titled Anytime You Need a Friend EP, which contains the remixes from the US and European CD maxi-singles, as well as previously unreleased remixes, including 'C+C Extended Mix', 'C+C Dub', 'Boriqua Tribe Mix', 'All That And More Mix', 'Anytime Edit' and 'Video Edit'. The EP was released in tandem with two another extended plays, including an eleven-track EP of "Dreamlover" and a three-track EP of "Never Forget You".

== Music videos ==
In the still, Carey is seen singing. Behind her stand the choir, perched on the large stairwell. Critics noted the inclusions of God and religion in the video, during moments such as this when prayer to God is imminent.

The accompanying music video for "Anytime You Need a Friend" was directed by Danielle Federici and filmed during the early summer of 1994. It was filmed in black-and-white, and features Carey walking along the streets of New York, watching several people, ranging from a small child to an elderly man, lonely and in need of a friend. Additionally, aside from several scenes of Carey and a large church choir in a large antechamber, the video is known as the first video in which Carey appears with straightened hair. Throughout her career up until that point, Carey had famously sported long, auburn curls. However, the video presented Carey's first image makeover, where she appears with bangs and a long straightened hairstyle. The video begins with scenes of Carey walking down a long New York street, with the addition of close ups of Carey's face. As she stares down the road, she witnesses a small girl, sitting alone in an alley corner, glaring into the sky. As the first chorus begins, Carey enters a large foyer, with a choir dressed in black singing perched atop a large staircase. During the second verse, she similarly witnesses an older man, who is sitting on a withered stoop.

Consecutively, during the song's bridge, Carey watches as the small child's mother carries her to a nearby playground where her friends are frolicking and playing. Similarly, the elderly man is met with some other elderly citizens, who accompany him to another building nearby. During the song's climax, Carey joins the choir, flailing her hands wildly towards the sky, and smiling and gazing into the cloudy morning. Renee Graham from The Boston Globe gave the video two out of four stars. She complimented on the fact that the video captured the song's lyrical essence and how it managed to portray it in a clear and concise way. Although calling it "simple," Graham commented that "Videos have never really been Mariah Carey's thing, and frankly, they've never had to be. Carey has a killer voice, so the last thing she'd want to do is overshadow her singing with a lot of choreography, complicated story lines or explosions." Author Chris Nickson compared several parts of the video to religion and belief in God. During such scenes when Carey appears with the choir, he felt it seemed as though they were both channeling a common entity through music; God. Additionally, he claimed it was more evident with each passing scene of the video, as each of the lonely people in the video gaze up into the skies, possibly praying or searching for an answer to their loneliness. A video was commissioned for the C+C club mix of the song. Known as the C+C video edit, it was also directed by Danielle Federici and serves as a behind the scenes addendum to the main music video. It is also filmed in black and white, and is composed of clips of Carey and her friends during filming of the video, where they chat, laugh and enjoy time with each other. Carey's husband at the time Tommy Mottola made a cameo appearance in the video, appearing alongside Carey during the second verse. The remix video was later included on the 1995 home video release, Fantasy: Mariah Carey at Madison Square Garden.

In March of the year 2020, Entertainment Tonight released behind the scenes footage from a scrapped version of the original music video on their YouTube channel. This version has Carey in a floor-length gown with her hair styled into her signature curls and was to feature a medieval structure as well as a gospel choir. In the video posted by Entertainment Tonight, Carey talks about the concept of the video with director Diane Martel, shows Entertainment Tonight around the set and performs a short a cappella rendition of her song "Now That I Know" from her album, Music Box. Carey also has moments where she gets her hair and makeup retouched during the filming. This version of the music video was ultimately shelved and remains unreleased to this day.

== Live performances ==
Carey promoted "Anytime You Need a Friend" on several live televised performances throughout the United States, Europe and Asia. Carey's performance of the song at an intimate concert at Proctor's Theatre on July 15, 1993, was filmed and released as the VHS Here Is Mariah Carey. Carey performed the song during a live appearance on the Late Show with David Letterman, which was followed by an interview regarding the album. During the performance, a live band and several male and female background vocalists were featured. Promotion through Europe included a visit and performance on the British music chart program Top of the Pops, German entertainment show Wetten, dass..?, Hey Hey It's Saturday in Australia, and the 1993 Japanese Music Fair. Aside from the several televised appearances, Carey performed the song throughout her Music Box Tour (1993) and Daydream World Tour (1996). During the shows in 1993, Carey featured the song as the fifteenth song on the set-list, and was performed in a similar fashion as on her televised appearances.

Prior to beginning the song, Carey urged the crowd to "never be lonely" and "always try and find that special person in your life." Following the show in Chicago, Chicago Tribune critic Greg Kot felt that her performance of the song truly "demonstrated that her multi-octave voice is no studio fabrication." During her shows at the Tokyo Dome during 1996, Carey sported a long and wavy hairstyle, while wearing a long black gown. She sang the original version of the song, up until halfway through the last chorus, until merging into the C+C remix. Several background vocalists were once again featured on stage, all donning black garbs. However, once the remix began, six male dancers made their way to the right and left sides of the stage, performing heavy dance routines as Carey walked around the stage. Once the remix began, the lighting was altered. Aside from the usual fluorescent lighting that was used throughout the show, additional pink and purple lighting was added for the number, as it served for the shows closing and final song. During her succeeding shows in Europe, Carey's outfits altered as well as her hairstyle. She wore a long, white strapless gown and sported her hair in a straightened ponytail style. From 1996 to 2019, Carey has not performed the song live on television or on her tours.

Carey started performing the song for the first time in 23 years on Caution World Tour in 2019.

== Other versions ==
In a review done by Digital Spy for Leona Lewis' debut album, Spirit, Nick Levine felt the song "Footprints in the Sand" borrowed heavily from Carey's track, writing "'Footprints In The Sand' seems hellbent on revisiting Mariah Carey's schlock-pop masterwork 'Anytime You Need A Friend.'" "Anytime You Need a Friend" was covered on several occasions on a variety of reality and talent competitions. Some became heavily popularized by the media due to the nature of the performance or performer. On the fifth season of the British talent program The X Factor, contestant Eoghan Quigg performed a live cover of the song during a "Mariah Carey" themed week. The song was chosen by Simon Cowell, who felt it would fit his younger vocals. Following the performance, he received acclaim from all three judges. Following the show's end, Quigg embarked on a live tour throughout 2009 alongside the other finalists, performing the song at each show alongside fellow contestant, Diana Vickers. Similarly, on the fourth season of the reality talent show America's Got Talent, a trio of children named Michael, Avery and Nadia, together forming "The Voices of Glory," performed a live rendition of the song. Their performance was well received by the judges, with David Hasselhoff exclaiming "Wonderful, wonderful, wonderful job."

== Track listings ==
- 7-inch vinyl single
1. "Anytime You Need a Friend" (album version) – 4:26
2. "Music Box" – 4:57
- Austrian CD maxi-single
1. "Anytime You Need a Friend" (album version) – 4:36
2. "Anytime You Need a Friend" (Soul Convention Remix) – 4:51
- European CD maxi-single
1. "Anytime You Need a Friend" (album version) – 4:36
2. "Anytime You Need a Friend" (C+C radio mix) – 4:14
3. "Anytime You Need a Friend" (Soul Convention Remix) – 4:51
4. "Anytime You Need a Friend" (C+C club version) – 10:53
5. "Anytime You Need a Friend" (Dave's Empty Pass) – 10:54
- Canadian and US CD maxi-single 1
1. "Anytime You Need a Friend" (Soul Convention Remix) – 4:51
2. "Anytime You Need a Friend" (Stringapella) – 4:49
3. "Anytime You Need a Friend" (album version) – 4:36
4. "Music Box" – 4:57
- Canadian and US CD maxi-single 2
1. "Anytime You Need a Friend" (C+C club version) – 10:53
2. "Anytime You Need a Friend" (Ministry of Sound Mix) – 9:45
3. "Anytime You Need a Friend" (Dave's Empty Pass) – 10:54
4. "Anytime You Need a Friend" (7-inch mix) – 6:59
- Anytime You Need a Friend EP
1. "Anytime You Need a Friend" (C+C radio mix) – 4:14
2. "Anytime You Need a Friend" (C+C club version) – 10:53
3. "Anytime You Need a Friend" (C+C extended mix) – 8:18
4. "Anytime You Need a Friend" (C+C dub) – 10:19
5. "Anytime You Need a Friend" (Boriqua Tribe Mix) – 9:16
6. "Anytime You Need a Friend" (All That and More Mix) – 10:54
7. "Anytime You Need a Friend" (Soul Convention Remix) – 4:51
8. "Anytime You Need a Friend" (Ministry of Sound Mix) – 9:45
9. "Anytime You Need a Friend" (7-inch mix) – 6:59
10. "Anytime You Need a Friend" (Dave's Empty Pass) – 10:54
11. "Anytime You Need a Friend" (Anytime edit) – 4:45
12. "Anytime You Need a Friend" (video edit) – 6:10
13. "Anytime You Need a Friend" (Stringapella) – 4:49

== Credits and personnel ==
These credits were adapted from the Music Box liner notes.

"Anytime You Need a Friend" was recorded at Right Track Studios, New York, and mixed at Sony Music Studios, New York.

- Mariah Carey – co-producing, songwriting, lyricist, vocals
- Walter Afanasieff – co-producing, songwriting, keyboards, synthesizer, organ
- Michael Landau – guitar
- Cindy Mizelle – backing vocals
- Kelly Price – backing vocals
- Mark C. Rooney – backing vocals
- Melonie Daniels – backing vocals
- Shanrae Price – backing vocals
- Ren Klyce – programming
- Dana Jon Chappelle – engineering
- Bob Ludwig – mastering
- Mick Guzauski – mixing

== Charts ==
=== Weekly charts ===
Chart (1994)	Peak position
Australia (ARIA)	12
Austria (Ö3 Austria Top 40)	25
Belgium (Ultratop 50 Flanders)	13
Canada Contemporary Hit Radio (The Record)	7
Canada Dance Tracks (The Record)	12
Canada Pop Adult (The Record)	3
Canada Top Singles (RPM)	5
Canada Adult Contemporary (RPM)	3
Europe (Eurochart Hot 100)	19
Europe (European AC Top 25)	4
Europe (European Hit Radio)	4
Finland (Suomen virallinen lista)	1
France (SNEP)	12
Germany (GfK)	41
Iceland (Íslenski Listinn Topp 40)	9
Ireland (IRMA)	16
Israel (Israeli Singles Chart)	1
Japan (Oricon)	34
Netherlands (Dutch Top 40)	10
Netherlands (Single Top 100)	11
New Zealand (Recorded Music NZ)	5
Panama (UPI)	7
Scottish Singles Sales (Official Charts)	12
Switzerland (Schweizer Hitparade)	15
UK Singles (Official Charts)	8
UK Club (Music Week) C+C Music Factory/Soul Convention remixes	5
UK Dance (Music Week)	7
UK Airplay (Music Week)	4
US Hot 100 Singles (Billboard)	12
US Hot Adult Contemporary (Billboard)	5
US Hot Dance Music Club Play (Billboard)	1
US Hot Dance Music Maxi-Singles Sales (Billboard)	8
US Hot R&B Singles (Billboard)	22
US Top 40/Mainstream (Billboard)	5
US Top 40/Rhythm-Crossover (Billboard)	14
US Cash Box Top 100	4
US Top 100 R&B Singles (Cash Box)	12
US Adult Contemporary (Gavin Report)	2
US Top 40 (Gavin Report)	3
US Urban (Gavin Report)	14
US Adult Contemporary (Radio & Records)	3
US CHR/Top 40 (Radio & Records)	7
US Hot AC/Adult CHR (Radio & Records)	7
US Urban Contemporary (Radio & Records)	26

Chart (2008)	Peak position
UK Singles (Official Charts)	96

=== Year-end charts ===
Chart (1994)	Position
Canada Top Singles (RPM)	39
Canada Adult Contemporary (RPM)	23
Europe (European Hit Radio)	17
Iceland (Íslenski Listinn Topp 40)	79
Israel (Israeli Singles Chart)	21
Netherlands (Dutch Top 40)	121
New Zealand (Recorded Music NZ)	39
UK Singles (OCC)	103
UK Airplay (Music Week)	25
UK Club (Music Week)	96
US Billboard Hot 100	47
US Adult Contemporary (Billboard)	21
US Adult Contemporary (Radio & Records)	11
US Cash Box Top 100	24
US Contemporary Hit Radio (Radio & Records)	26
US Hot Dance Club Play (Billboard)	39

== Certifications and sales ==
Region	Certification	Certified units/sales
Australia (ARIA)	Gold	35,000^{‡}
Japan (RIAJ)	Gold	50,000^{^}
New Zealand (RMNZ)	Gold	5,000^{*}
United Kingdom (BPI)	Silver	200,000^{‡}
United States (RIAA)	Gold	500,000^{‡}
^{*} Sales figures based on certification alone.^{^} Shipments figures based on certification alone.^{‡} Sales+streaming figures based on certification alone.

== Release history ==
Release dates and formats for "Anytime You Need a Friend"
Region	Date	Format	Label	Ref.
Canada	May 24, 1994	CD maxi single 1; CD maxi single 2	Columbia	
Australia	June 6, 1994	CD single; cassette single	Columbia	
United Kingdom	June 6, 1994	7-inch single; cassette single; CD single	Columbia	
United States	June 14, 1994	CD maxi single 1	Columbia	
United States	June 21, 1994	CD maxi single 2	Columbia	
Australia	July 4, 1994	CD single; cassette single (remixes)	Columbia	
Japan	July 21, 1994	Mini CD single	Sony Music Japan	
Japan	August 21, 1994	CD maxi single	Sony Music Japan	

== See also ==
- List of number-one dance singles of 1994 (U.S.)
