= Never Forget You (Mariah Carey song) =

1994 single by Mariah Carey

Single by Mariah Carey

from the album Music Box
- A-side: "Without You" (double A-side)
- Released: January 21, 1994
- Studio: Right Track Recording (New York City)
- Genre: Pop; R&B
- Length: 3:45
- Label: Columbia
- Songwriters: Mariah Carey; Kenneth Edmonds
- Producers: Mariah Carey; Babyface; Daryl Simmons

Mariah Carey singles chronology
"Without You" (1994)	"Never Forget You" (1994)	"Anytime You Need a Friend" (1994)

Audio video
- "Never Forget You" on YouTube

"Never Forget You" is a song recorded by American singer-songwriter Mariah Carey for her third studio album, Music Box (1993). Carey co-wrote the slow jam with Babyface and the pair produced it with Daryl Simmons. Columbia Records released the song on January 21, 1994, as the B-side to "Without You" and promoted it to American urban contemporary radio stations as the album's fourth single. The lyrics lament the end of a romance. Strings, synthesizers, and percussion characterize the composition; Jermaine Dupri altered them for remixes.

Music critics deemed "Never Forget You" unremarkable and derivative. The song's level of emotion and Carey's vocal performance were further topics of commentary. "Never Forget You" peaked at numbers one and three on the US urban contemporary radio charts published by Radio & Records and Gavin Report, respectively. It also reached number three on Billboard Hot 100 Singles and number seven on Billboard Hot R&B Singles. Combined with "Without You", the single sold 600,000 copies in the US throughout 1994.

== Background and release ==
After the 1992 release of her first extended play, MTV Unplugged, Mariah Carey began to work on her third studio album, Music Box (1993). She resumed recording with previous collaborators Walter Afanasieff, David Cole, and Robert Clivillés, and began new relationships with producers Dave Hall and Babyface. The latter was known for his traditional ballad productions. According to author Marc Shapiro, this aligned with the album's intended musical identity of "leaning toward the basic R&B feel while not forgetting the orchestration and polish".

Columbia Records released Music Box on August 31, 1993. The label promoted the sixth track, Carey–Babyface collaboration "Never Forget You", as the album's fourth single and provided it to American urban contemporary radio stations in January 1994. It is also the B-side to the third single, "Without You", which was released on January 21, 1994. Columbia issued the song in several formats: 7-inch vinyl, 12-inch vinyl, cassette, maxi cassette, CD, and maxi CD. "Never Forget You" is Carey's first single without a music video. Billboard writer Andrew Hampp thought this indicates the release was inconsequential to her and Columbia.

== Composition and lyrics ==
"Never Forget You"
"Never Forget You" features background vocals from Carey and Babyface in a composition characterized by strings, synthesizers, and percussion.

"Never Forget You" is a pop and R&B slow jam. Carey and Babyface wrote the lyrics in which the narrator softly laments the end of a romance: "No, I'll never forget you / I'll never let you out of my heart / You will always be here with me / I'll hold on to your memories, baby." The pair composed the music and then produced the song with Daryl Simmons. It features strings, synthesizers, and percussion prominently. Babyface plays the drums and keyboards and Koyo performs the bass. Carey and Babyface provide background vocals; the former's are overdubbed in the chorus.

Jim Zumpano, Dana Jon Chappelle, and Jim Caruana engineered the track at Right Track Recording in New York City, after which Mick Guzauski mixed it in Sony Music Studios. Like every song on Music Box, "Never Forget You" was mastered by Bob Ludwig at Gateway in Portland, Maine. According to sheet music published by Hal Leonard, the song is composed in 6/8 time signature with a "moderately slow" tempo. It has a swung rhythm every sixteenth note and lasts for three minutes and 45 seconds. Carey biographer Chris Nickson felt that the waltz time evokes "an air of partners gliding around the dancefloor in memories".

Jermaine Dupri produced remixes of "Never Forget You" at KrossWire Studio in Atlanta, Georgia. Carey had wanted to collaborate with him after hearing his work on the 1992 Kris Kross single "Jump". Phil Tan and Jamie Seyberth engineered the tracks and Dupri and Tan mixed them at Hollywood's Larrabee Sound Studios.

== Critical reception ==
Music critics deemed "Never Forget You" forgettable (Note: Attributed to David Browne of Entertainment Weekly, Chuck Campbell of The Knoxville News-Sentinel, Gary Graff of the Detroit Free Press, Leah Greeblatt of Entertainment Weekly, Andrew Hampp of Billboard, Craig Roberts of the Gay and Lesbian Times, and Paul Willistein of The Morning Call) and unoriginal. (Note: Attributed to Parry Gettelman of the Orlando Sentinel, Mike Joyce of The Washington Post, Dave Larsen of the Dayton Daily News, and Troy L. Smith of Cleveland.com) They compared it to Babyface's other compositions such as Boyz II Men's "End of the Road" (1992). David Browne of Entertainment Weekly said "Never Forget You" squanders Babyface's abilities. New York Times writer Deborah Frost suggested it "seems designed to showcase his skills as a pop charmer rather than [Carey's]".

Critics evaluated the song's level of emotion; several described it as genuine. (Note: Attributed to Billboard, Keith Loria of the Associated Press, and Lynn Norment of Ebony) Bill Speed and John Martinucci from the Gavin Report called it "a ballad that puts you into a sentimental mood before you can say 'I like this'". Toledo Blade writer Stewart Walker thought it showcased "Carey as one of those rare artists who can actually convey her feelings to her listeners". In contrast, Dayton Daily News critic Dave Larsen derided "Never Forget You" as overblown and Mike Joyce of The Washington Post felt that "even Aretha Franklin would be hard pressed to make an emotional statement" given the lyrics.

Carey's vocal performance was another topic of commentary. Cleveland.com's Troy L. Smith considered it the song's highlight. Richmond Times-Dispatch writer Patrick McCarty said she "spirals to unnerving heights with volume and shrieks to spare"; Fort Worth Star-Telegram writer Dave Ferman reckoned her voice was more restrained than on songs from her previous albums. Billboard writers Andrew Hampp and Princess Gabbara complimented Carey's harmonies with Babyface. According to Julianne Shepherd of Vibe, "her piercing vocals amplify [his] signature indelible melodies".

== Chart performance ==
"Never Forget You" is one of the best-performing songs produced by Babyface in the 1990s. Combined with "Without You", the single sold 600,000 copies in the United States throughout 1994. An urban radio success, "Never Forget You" peaked at numbers one and three on charts published by Radio & Records and Gavin Report, respectively.

At the time of the single's release, Billboard allowed an A-side and B-side to chart together if both received radio airplay. (Note: The magazine determined its collective position by combining airplay data for each side with sales and listed the side with more airplay first; this was an uncommon occurrence.) "Never Forget You" received some spins from pop radio stations and charted with "Without You" on Hot 100 Singles beginning February 12, 1994. The single peaked at number three in the week ending March 19, 1994. It is Carey's 13th-best performing title on the chart as of 2018 and remains her sole double-sided appearance.

On Hot R&B Singles, "Never Forget You" debuted at number 94 in the February 5, 1994, Billboard issue. "Without You" was listed with it from March 12, 1994, and the pair reached number seven in the week ending April 9, 1994. (Note: On the comparative Cash Box R&B chart, "Never Forget You" reached number five.) The peaks on both the Hot R&B and Hot 100 charts were the second lowest of Carey's career at the time, respectively behind "I'll Be There" and "Make It Happen".

== Charts ==
1994 weekly chart performance
Chart	Peak position
Iceland (Íslenski Listinn Topp 40)	8
US Hot 100 Singles (Billboard) with "Without You"	3
US Hot R&B Singles (Billboard) with "Without You"	7
US Top 100 R&B Singles (Cash Box)	5
US Urban (Gavin Report)	3
US Urban (Radio & Records)	1

1994 year-end chart performance
Chart	Position
US Hot 100 Singles (Billboard) with "Without You"	16
US Hot R&B Singles (Billboard) with "Without You"	61
US Top 100 R&B Singles (Cash Box)	35
US Urban (Radio & Records)	39

== Track listings ==
- 1994 US maxi cassette/maxi CD single
1. "Never Forget You" (Radio Edit) – 3:35
2. "Never Forget You" (Extended) – 5:17
3. "Never Forget You" (Album Version) – 3:45
4. "Never Forget You" (Instrumental) – 3:34
5. "Without You" (Album Version) – 3:34
- 1994 US 12-inch vinyl single

A1. "Never Forget You" (Extended) – 5:17
A2. "Never Forget You" (Radio Edit) – 3:35
A3. "Never Forget You" (Instrumental) – 3:34
B1. "Never Forget You" (Album Version) – 3:45
B2. "Without You" (Album Version) – 3:34

- 2020 MC30 digital EP
1. "Never Forget You" (Radio Edit) – 3:35
2. "Never Forget You" (Extended) – 5:17
3. "Never Forget You" (Instrumental) – 3:34

== Credits ==
=== Album version ===
Locations

- Recorded at Right Track Recording (New York City)
- Mixed at Sony Music Studios (New York City)
- Mastered at Gateway Mastering Studios (Portland, Maine)

Personnel

- Babyface – arranger, background vocals, drums, keyboards, producer
- Mariah Carey – arranger, background vocals, lead vocals, producer
- Jim Caruana – second engineering
- Dana Jon Chappelle – vocal engineering
- Mick Guzauski – mixing
- Koyo – bass
- Bob Ludwig – mastering
- Daryl Simmons – arranger, producer
- Jim Zumpano – engineering

=== Dupri remixes ===
Locations

- Produced at KrossWire Studio (Atlanta, Georgia)
- Mixed at Larrabee Sound Studios (Hollywood, California)

Personnel

- Jermaine Dupri – mixing, producer
- Jamie Seyberth – assistant engineering
- Phil Tan – engineering, mixing
