= Music Box (album) =

1993 studio album by Mariah Carey

Studio album by Mariah Carey
- Released: August 31, 1993
- Recorded: October 1992 – May 1993
- Studios: Axis; Electric Lady; House of Sound; Right Track (New York City); Criteria (Miami); The Plant (Sausalito); Record Plant (Los Angeles)
- Genres: Pop; R&B
- Length: 41:55
- Label: Columbia
- Producers: Mariah Carey; Dave Hall; Walter Afanasieff; David Cole; Robert Clivillés; Babyface; Daryl Simmons

Mariah Carey chronology
MTV Unplugged (1992)	Music Box (1993)	Merry Christmas (1994)

Singles from Music Box
- 1. "Dreamlover" Released: July 27, 1993; 2. "Hero" Released: October 18, 1993; 3. "Without You" Released: January 21, 1994; 4. "Never Forget You" Released: January 21, 1994; 5. "Anytime You Need a Friend" Released: May 24, 1994

Music Box is the third studio album by American singer-songwriter Mariah Carey. It was released on August 31, 1993, by Columbia Records. In an attempt to appeal to a wider audience, Carey sought a radio-friendly approach for Music Box.

Music Box saw Carey working with both new and returning producers and songwriters, including Babyface, Robert Clivillés, Walter Afanasieff, David Cole, and Daryl Simmons. It is a pop and R&B album infused with soul, gospel, dance, and jazz. Music Box consists mainly of pop ballads and uptempo dance tracks. Despite the involvement of multiple producers, most of the songwriting was handled by Carey and Afanasieff, who had previously collaborated on Emotions (1991), continuing a partnership that would conclude with Butterfly (1997). She also experimented with different production techniques, including a more live-oriented sound and a more restrained use of her upper register.

Carey promoted Music Box with the North American Music Box Tour—her debut concert tour—and five singles. The first two, "Dreamlover" and "Hero", spent eight and four consecutive weeks at number one on the US Billboard Hot 100, respectively. They were nominated for Best Female Pop Vocal Performance at the 36th (1994) and 37th (1995) Annual Grammy Awards, respectively. The international third and fourth singles, "Without You" and "Anytime You Need a Friend", were commercially successful worldwide; "Without You" became her most successful song globally. In the US, "Without You" and "Never Forget You" were issued as a double A-side single that reached the top three of the Hot 100. (Note: "Never Forget You" was issued as a double A-side single with "Without You" exclusively in the United States, and not released as a single anywhere else; the international success of "Without You" occurred independently of "Never Forget You". Consequently, "Anytime You Need a Friend" was the fifth single from Music Box in the United States, but the fourth internationally.)

On release, Music Box received generally mixed reviews from music critics, who praised Carey's vocal performance and some of the songs but criticized its mellow, formulaic, and subdued lyricism. Retrospective reviews have been more positive; journalists consider it to be the album that sent Carey to global superstardom. It topped the charts in 17 countries, including Australia, France, Germany, and the United Kingdom. In the United States, it topped the Billboard 200 for eight non-consecutive weeks and was certified diamond by the Recording Industry Association of America. Music Box remains Carey's bestseller and one of the best-selling albums of all time, with over 30 million copies sold worldwide.

== Background and recording ==
In 1988, American singer-songwriter Mariah Carey was discovered by Tommy Mottola, chief executive officer of Columbia Records, and was promptly signed to the label. The creative process of her debut studio album, Mariah Carey (1990), primarily involved re-recording and reworking songs she had written with Ben Margulies. Incorporating elements of pop and R&B, the record received generally positive reviews from critics, who praised her vocal abilities. Mariah Carey was commercially successful, selling approximately fifteen million copies worldwide. Emotions (1991), her second album, combined gospel, R&B, and soul. Although some critics viewed the album as more mature, it did not match the critical or commercial success of her debut and had much lower sales.

Carey had gained increased control over her music following the release of her live extended play, MTV Unplugged (1992), allowing her greater freedom to pursue her own artistic preferences. After her marriage to Mottola in June 1993, there was public speculation that her third studio effort would be a more pop-oriented album with polished production and lighthearted themes. As work on the album began, Carey described it as a more "subtle progression", with elements of soul, jazz, and gospel, alongside some uptempo tracks and a more restrained use of her upper vocal range. Music Box saw Carey working with producers from Emotions, including Walter Afanasieff, Robert Clivillés, and David Cole, and new producers Kenneth "Babyface" Edmonds and Dave Hall. Biographer Marc Shapiro thought that the success of Emotions and MTV Unplugged inspired Carey to conceive her third album with a blend of styles, combining R&B elements with the "orchestration and polish[ed]" production of her self-titled 1990 debut.

One of the earliest songs developed during the recording sessions was "Dreamlover", an upbeat pop track that Carey wrote alongside Hall. After hearing the track, Mottola suggested that it should be made more commercially oriented. He then approached Afanasieff, who reworked the keyboards and drums, which Nickson said gave the song "more swing and more drive". While working on Music Box, Afanasieff was simultaneously involved in scoring the film Hero (1992). As part of this, he and Carey began writing a theme song intended for Gloria Estefan. After completing the song, both felt it exceeded their expectations. When Mottola heard the track, he encouraged Carey to keep it for herself rather than contribute it to the film. Following this, Carey and Afanasieff revised the lyrics, shaping them into the more personal ballad "Hero". Afanasieff helped co-write four other tracks: "Anytime You Need a Friend", "All I've Ever Wanted", "Just to Hold You Once Again", and "Music Box". Clivillés and Cole contributed to writing, performing, and producing two of the album's dance-oriented songs, "Now That I Know" and "I've Been Thinking About You".

== Composition ==
=== Music and lyrics ===
Primarily consisting of ballads, Music Box is a pop and R&B album with elements of soul, gospel, dance, and jazz. Nickson observed that the record featured gospel and soul elements to a lesser extent than Carey's previous albums, attributing the shift to her need to evolve and make gradual changes in her sound. Critics have noted that the album showcased two different types of songs: romantic, emotive ballads like "Never Forget You" and "Just to Hold You Once Again", and pop–dance tracks like "Dreamlover" and "Now That I Know". Carey sought to balance her preference for layered studio production with a more open, live-oriented sound on the album. While she continued to employ multitracked backing vocals and contemporary studio technology, including synthesizers and drum machines, the arrangements were more restrained. The overall production placed greater emphasis on clarity and space within the mixes.

The Morning Call wrote that Carey's singing on Music Box was "noticeably subdued", suggesting that criticism of her "stunt-singing" on Emotions may have pushed her toward a more restrained approach. According to Shapiro, the album showed signs of her lyrical and vocal maturity, and represented an album she was truly proud of. Unlike her previous albums, Music Box featured limited use of Carey's upper register. She said that she approached the album by singing "from the heart" in her natural voice, adding that her speaking voice is low and that her lower register felt more comfortable. Music Box was designed to appeal to a wider audience through radio-friendly songs. The album explores a range of lyrical themes, including hopeless romance and longing in "Just to Hold You Once Again" and "All I've Ever Wanted", as well as self-sufficiency in "Hero"; other tracks, such as "Dreamlover", address devotion. Some critics observed that the lyrics of several songs relied on pop and soul clichés.

=== Songs ===
Music Box opens with "Dreamlover", a mid-tempo pop song with some R&B influences. Lyrically, it describes a longing for an idealized romantic partner—a mythic "Dreamlover"—who will rescue and take her away, providing genuine love and safety instead of past pretenders who disillusioned her with false promises. Carey employs her upper-octave vocals on the track; Shapiro described her voice as sounding "perpetually happy", likening it to that of a little girl. The song incorporates a sample of the hook from "Blind Alley" by the Emotions—previously used in "Ain't No Half-Steppin'" (1988) by Big Daddy Kane—into its melody and instrumentation. Critics have viewed "Dreamlover" as Carey's first attempt at R&B, a style she would further develop later with albums like Daydream (1995) and Butterfly (1997).

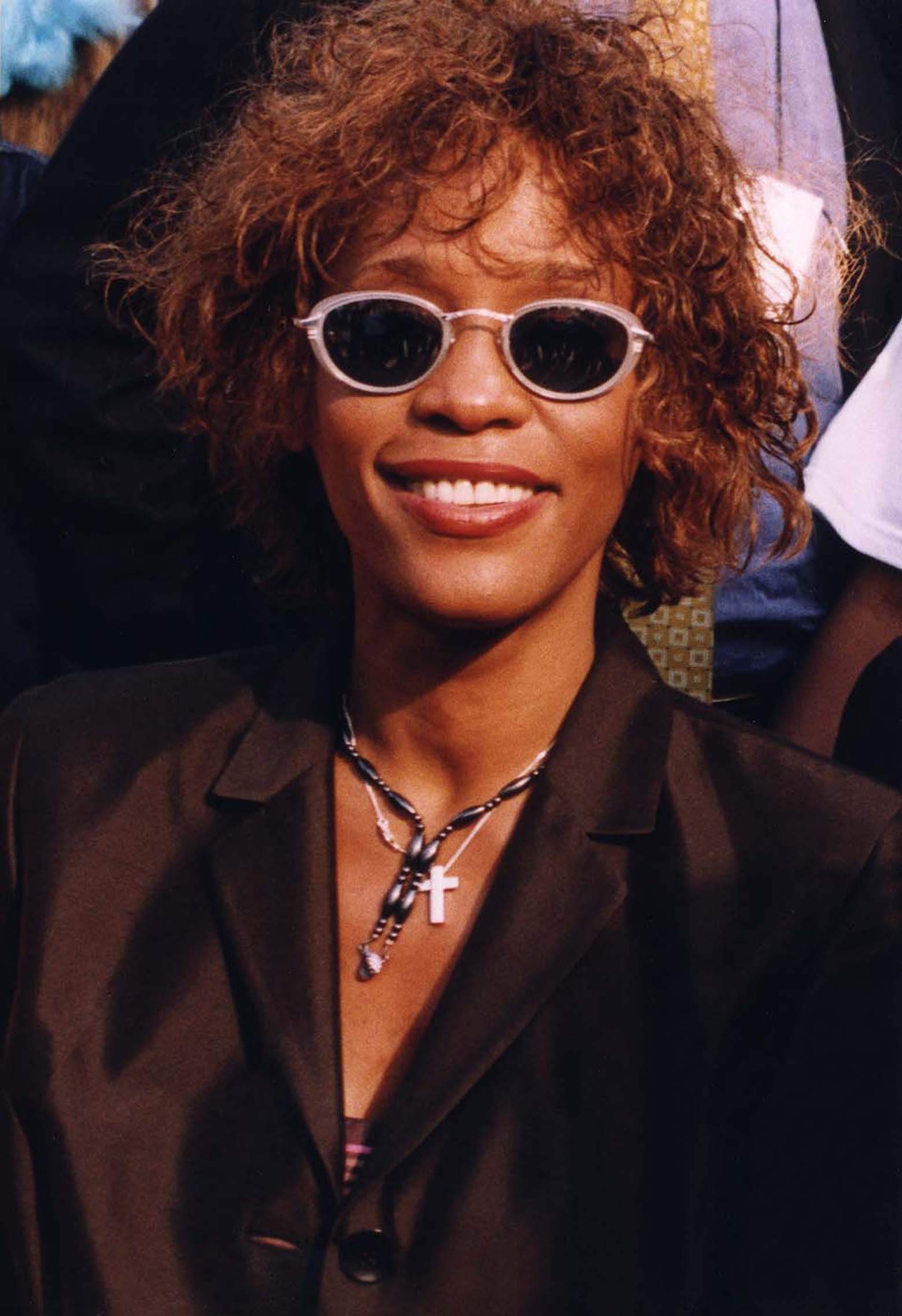
Critics observed similarities between songs on Music Box and other tracks, such as "Hero" resembling Whitney Houston's "Greatest Love of All" (1986).

The second track, "Hero", is a sentimental ballad in which Carey employs her lower alto register. One of the album's more emotional songs, the song gradually builds with each verse, growing in intensity until it finally breaks through, both in the lyrics—realizing one's inner power—and in its production, as it lifts from a minor key into a more triumphant one. Its overarching theme is recognizing that every individual can be their own hero. Some critics noticed similarities between "Hero" and Whitney Houston's "Greatest Love of All" (1986). "Anytime You Need a Friend", the third track, is a pop ballad in which Carey allows her voice to "roam free". The song includes lower, rougher vocal tones. Like most tracks on Music Box, its lyrics convey a positive message, and it is the only song on the album that incorporates elements of gospel-style vocals in the chorus.

The fourth track, "Music Box", was described by Carey as the most difficult song on the album to perform, mainly due to its use of legato, a singing technique that involves maintaining a smooth, connected tone at a soft volume. Nickson wrote that the track required a great amount of control to maintain the song's "softness and sweetness", without having to resort to volume. He described her vocals on the track as "soft and controlled", maintaining a balance that allowed them to move smoothly over the keyboard and subtle guitar. Lyrically, the song speaks of commitment and promise, in combination with a "tinkling" music box–like synthesizer motif. One of two songs on Music Box produced by Clivillés and Cole, "Now That I Know" is a dance track with soul influences.

"Never Forget You", the sixth track on Music Box, is an R&B slow jam. Carey and Babyface contribute background vocals, with the former's parts layered in the chorus through overdubbing. The lyrics lament a romantic relationship. Nickson thought of it as a standout track, one that could have easily become a hit single, "with an appeal that would have easily transcended generational barriers". "Without You", a melodramatic ballad, is a cover of the Badfinger song based on the version by Harry Nilsson. In the rendition, Carey explores her lower vocal register and is supported by layered background vocals—including her own—arranged to create the effect of a powerful, gospel-style chorus. The eighth track "Just to Hold You Once Again" features elements such as a gospel choir, and, with its climactic progression, a key change near the end. The song is about the confusion following a breakup, with the narrator questioning the separation.

"I've Been Thinking About You" is the other dance track on the album, and samples Melvin Bliss's "Synthetic Substitution" (1973) and Slave's "Just a Touch of Love" (1979). Lyrically about unexpectedly falling in love with a friend, "I've Been Thinking About You" was the last song Carey, Clivillés, and Cole had worked on before Cole's death in 1995. Music Box concludes with "All I've Ever Wanted", a ballad-style love song. Its lyrics, dedicated to Mottola, express a desire to ignite a romance with a longtime love interest. "Everything Fades Away", which incorporates elements of R&B and new jack swing, was released as a B-side to "Hero" and included as a bonus track on international editions of the Music Box.

== Release and promotion ==
For if Emotions had demonstrated her quick advancement from the material on Mariah Carey, then Music Box stood as a quantum leap forward.

— Nickson, writing in Mariah Carey Revisited: Her Story (1998)

Music Box was released on August 31, 1993, in both the United States and the United Kingdom, followed by releases in Hong Kong on September 8 and Japan on September 11. To promote the album, Carey launched her first headlining concert tour, the Music Box Tour. Overcoming her stage fright—which had prevented her from touring for prior albums—she agreed to the tour at Mottola's urging amid the album's success, scheduling just six shows with rest periods to protect her voice. Before the tour, she performed at New York's Proctor's Theatre in July 1993, captured in the one-hour television special, Here Is Mariah Carey. There, she performed four songs from Music Box: "Dreamlover", "Hero", "Without You", and "Anytime You Need a Friend". On December 10, 1993, Carey performed "Hero" at Madison Square Garden, announcing that all proceeds from the performance would be donated to the families of the victims of the Long Island Rail Road shooting.

The Music Box Tour began on November 3, 1993, in Miami, Florida, and ended on December 10 in New York City. Tickets for the concerts sold steadily upon release, without immediate sell-outs. The opening night at Miami Arena drew about two-thirds capacity, causing concern for Carey's management, though she began the show with enthusiasm. While opening night at Miami Arena drew mixed reviews and partial attendance, subsequent sold-out dates earned praise. In addition to the Music Box Tour, Carey promoted the album through appearances on American and European television, where she performed its singles. Her 1993 performances included "Dreamlover" on The Arsenio Hall Show and "Hero" on The Jay Leno Show. In the United Kingdom, she made multiple appearances on Top of the Pops between 1993 and 1994, performing "Dreamlover" live and promoting "Hero", "Without You", and "Anytime You Need a Friend" through both live performances and music video broadcasts.

A three-disc deluxe edition of Music Box to mark its 30th anniversary, featuring unreleased tracks, remixes, live recordings, and remastered audio, was released digitally on September 8, 2023. Disc one contains the original album and the bonus track "Everything Fades Away". The second disc includes an extended version of "All I Live For" and the original version of "Do You Think of Me", both of which were previously released in 2020 on The Rarities, and Carey's duet with Luther Vandross, "Endless Love". It also contains various remixes, two previously unreleased tracks—"Workin' Hard" and "My Prayer", the latter a cover of a song written by Georges Boulanger—the 2009 re-recorded version of "Hero" from The Ballads, an a cappella version of "Music Box", an extended version of "Anytime You Need a Friend", and two live performances from Top of the Pops. Disc three presents her full 1993 concert at Proctor's Theatre, previously featured in Here Is Mariah Carey.

=== Singles ===
Music Box was promoted with five singles. The lead single, "Dreamlover", was released on July 27, 1993. On the US Billboard Hot 100, the song entered the chart at number forty. It reached number one in its sixth week and stayed atop the chart for eight consecutive weeks. It marked Carey's seventh number-one on the Hot 100. "Dreamlover" was certified platinum by the Recording Industry Association of America (RIAA), denoting shipments of one million copies. Elsewhere, it topped the charts in Canada, and became a top-ten hit in Australia, the Netherlands, New Zealand, Portugal and the United Kingdom. Critics responded positively to the song, with Larry Flick of Billboard describing the production as "elegant" and her vocals as "openhearted". By the time "Dreamlover" began its descent from the Hot 100, the second single, "Hero", was already ascending towards the top.

"Hero" was released as a single on October 19, 1993, in the US. It entered the Hot 100 at number seventy-one and reached number one in its tenth week, giving Carey her eighth US chart-topping single. The song spent four consecutive weeks at the top spot of the chart. The proceeds from the song were donated to the families of the victims of the Long Island Rail Road shooting. It earned a three-times platinum certification from the RIAA, denoting shipments of over three million copies. Outside the United States, "Hero" reached the top five on charts in Canada, France, Ireland, New Zealand, and Norway, as well as the top ten in Australia and the United Kingdom. (Note: Cited to multiple sources:) Flick called it an "inspirational winner with a sure, dignified message", while J. D. Considine for The Baltimore Sun called the lyrics "uplifting" and chorus "soaring".

"Without You" was released as the third single on January 21, 1994. It became a global commercial success, topping the charts of countries such as Austria, Belgium, Canada, Ireland, Netherlands, New Zealand, Scotland, Sweden, Switzerland, and the United Kingdom. In the US, "Without You" and "Never Forget You" were issued as a double A-side single, entering the Hot 100 at number fifty-three before peaking at number three. "Never Forget You" was promoted as the album's fourth single exclusively in the US. Carey's rendition of "Without You" brought renewed popularity to the song, ranking among the year's fifty most-played tracks and ultimately outselling Harry Nilsson's version. "Anytime You Need a Friend", the album's fourth worldwide single and fifth in the US, was released on May 24, 1994. It reached the top ten in Canada, New Zealand, and the United Kingdom. (Note: Cited to multiple sources:) It peaked at number twelve on the Hot 100, following its four-week climb from number forty-five.

== Critical reception ==
=== Contemporaneous ===
Professional ratings
Contemporaneous
Review scores
Source	Rating
The Detroit News	1/4 stars
Entertainment Weekly	C+
Los Angeles Times	1.5/4 stars
The Philadelphia Inquirer	2/4 stars
Regina Leader-Post	2/5 stars
Rolling Stone	3/5 stars

Music Box received mixed reviews from music critics upon release. While they praised Carey's vocal ability as the album's main strength, many found the lyrics lacking in emotional depth and substance.

Stephen Holden, writing for Rolling Stone, described Music Box as "so precisely calculated to be a blockbuster", stating it made Carey sound "a little more like a wailing street kid and a little less like [Whitney] Houston". He called the effect liberating but pointed to the lyrics as the album's main weakness, consisting entirely of pop and soul clichés. Time's Christopher John Farley argued that Music Box favored formulaic, mainstream pop over showcasing her vocal ability and criticized the album's repetitive themes and lack of passion. While praising tracks like "Anytime You Need a Friend", "Music Box", and "Without You", he concluded it was a missed opportunity for artistic growth. In the Arizona Daily Sun, Keith Loria wrote that Music Box did not offer anything new to the singer's fans and relied on the same formula as her albums Mariah Carey and Emotions.

In a positive review, Troy J. Augusto of Cash Box said that the album contained "warmer" and "more accessible" sounds than her previous albums. David Browne of Entertainment Weekly wrote that on Music Box, Carey's voice "drip[s] over [the ballads] like syrup instead of overpowering them; she lets the melodies speak for themselves". Although he highlighted "Dreamlover" and "Anytime You Need a Friend", Browne deemed the album's lyrics "absurdly generic" and argued that its "catchy" but familiar material and lack of authenticity ultimately limited its artistic impact. In the Los Angeles Times, Dennis Hunt said that Carey reduced her vocal "showboating" on Music Box, but criticized the album for lacking emotional depth. Hunt suggested its pop–soul sound was tailored to a mainstream audience that prefers "soul whitewashed and in small doses". The Detroit News critic Susan Whitall wrote that it did not contain "even a scintilla of honest emotion" and said that it was "all technique — a gospel turn" rather than genuine feeling.

People criticized Music Box as a mismatch between Carey's vocal ability and the material, describing it as "great pipes, lame songs". While praising "Dreamlover", "Anytime You Need a Friend", and "Without You", the critic found much of the album "weak", with "limp and formless" melodies. Parry Gettelman of the Orlando Sentinel opined that although Music Box showed Carey using greater vocal restraint and a more controlled style, she lacked an "original aesthetic sensibility", with songwriting that felt "banal". Gettelman lauded her improved lower-register vocals and a more measured production method. Patrick Davitt, a writer for the Regina Leader-Post, described the album as "as personal as a modern airplane" and said that Music Box "isn't an album; it's an engineering project". However, he praised Carey's vocals as better than those of most in the music industry.

=== Retrospective ===
Professional ratings
Retrospective
Review scores
Source	Rating
AllMusic	4/5 stars
Billboard	4/5 stars
Christgau's Consumer Guide	(dud)
The Rolling Stone Album Guide	2/5 stars

Retrospectively, critics have underscored the significance of the album in Carey's career. Rolling Stone's Tim Chan wrote that with Music Box, Carey became the "people's pop princess, ruling radio with hit after hit, while soundtracking weddings, proms and parties alike". While describing the album as "unchallenging" and "easy to swallow"—qualities the source suggested aligned with Sony's expectations for Carey—Slant Magazine also considered Music Box the release that made her as a "bona fide superstar". Stereogum's Tom Breihan wrote that while her earlier achievements had made her a "mere" pop superstar, her label wanted to make her "the pop superstar". With Music Box, Breihan suggested she had achieved the latter. Paste deemed it one of the greatest albums of all time.

Other retrospective reviews of the album have been more positive. Clash described Music Box as one of Carey's most "formidable achievements", writing that the album signalled the emergence of her as a "pop savant". Writing for Billboard, Andrew Hampp rated the album 80 out of 100 and opined that it is one of the "strongest albums in her catalog", with the best hits-to-filler ratio of any other pop album. Chan wrote that opined that it showed off "the power of Carey's now-instantly recognizable voice as she belted her way through ballads". Complex ranked Music Box as the twenty-ninth best R&B album of the 1990s, writing that tracks such as "Dreamlover" and "I've Been Thinking About You" started her shift away from her earlier ballad-driven style and helped evolve her sound. Writing for AllMusic, Ron Wynn observed that Carey deliberately toned down her vocal intensity on Music Box, saying she "trimmed the volume" to showcase a softer style. He called it "partly successful" and believed it was smart of Carey to explore her vocal approach differently.

Others have maintained the negative assessments that characterized the album's initial reception. In a less positive retrospective review, The Village Voice critic Robert Christgau labeled it a "dud", indicating "a bad record whose details rarely merit further thought". Wynn found much of the album felt "detached," with the restraint often resulting in "an absence of passion". Hampp also mentioned that the album includes a few ballads that feel "dated and soggy" and that it showed signs of her "uncomfortable marriage" to Mottola, questioning why a "happily married woman" would start her album with the plea, "Dreamlover, come rescue me". According to Nickson, Music Box was a significant artistic development for Carey, combining more sophisticated and subtle musical arrangements with lyrics that created a "very personal statement". He argued that the songwriting that some critics dismissed as "hackneyed high-school poetry" actually explored themes of faith, particularly "in love as a reason to carry on and as an inspiration".

== Commercial performance ==
In the United States, Music Box debuted at number two on the Billboard 200 with first-week sales of 174,000 copies. In its fifteenth week—on the chart dated December 25, 1993—the album reached number one, selling 295,000 copies in its first week at the top, 395,000 the following week, and a peak of 505,000 copies in its third consecutive week at the top. After being displaced by Doggystyle by Snoop Doggy Dogg for a week, it returned to number one for three consecutive weeks, for a total of six weeks at number one. Four weeks later, the album again reached number one, remaining there for an additional two consecutive weeks, for a total of eight non-consecutive weeks at the top. Music Box spent 128 weeks on the chart, including 31 weeks in the top ten. It spent two weeks atop the Top R&B/Hip-Hop Albums chart. In the US, it was the second best-selling album of 1994, ranking behind The Sign by Ace of Base. Music Box was Carey's first album to earn diamond certification from the RIAA, indicating shipments of 10 million copies. According to Billboard, the success of the album—as well as its follow-up, Daydream (1995)—helped Carey become the best-selling artist of the 1990s in the US.

Music Box saw immense success outside of the US. In Canada, it reached number two on the Top Albums chart and was certified septuple platinum by the Canadian Recording Industry Association. In Europe, Music Box topped 13 national charts. (Note: See § Charts for which record charts the album peaked at number one.) It topped the UK Albums Chart for six non-consecutive weeks and earned quintuple platinum certification from the British Phonographic Industry, making it her best-selling album in the United Kingdom. Music Box spent eighty weeks on the German Albums Chart, including eleven weeks at number one, and was certified double platinum by the Bundesverband Musikindustrie for over one million shipped copies, with total sales reaching 1.4 million. Music Box became a million-selling album in France, earning diamond certification and topping the French Albums Chart. It achieved six-times platinum status in the Netherlands and spent ninety-one weeks on the Dutch Album Top 100, including twelve non-consecutive weeks at number one. The album was the best-selling of 1994 in Europe, with six million copies that year and another million by 1995.

Music Box topped the albums charts in Australia for eighteen non-consecutive weeks and earned a twelve-times platinum certification from the Australian Recording Industry Association for 840,000 shipped copies. It finished as the number-one album on the 1994 end-of-year chart. In Asia, it sold 2.6 million copies in Japan, making it one of the country's best-selling albums of 1994. Sony reported good sales elsewhere: 320,000 in Taiwan, 110,000 in Singapore, and 80,000 in Hong Kong by July 1994. It has moved over one million copies in South Korea, making it one of the best-selling albums in the country. The album is one of only two albums by Western artists to sell more than one million copies in the country alongside The Bodyguard soundtrack by Whitney Houston. As of September 2023, Music Box has sold over 30 million copies worldwide, making it Carey's best-selling album and one of the best-selling albums of all time.

== Track listing ==
All lyrics are written by Mariah Carey, except where noted; all music is composed by Carey and Afanasieff, except where noted; all tracks are produced by Afanasieff and Mariah Carey, except where noted.

Standard track listing
No.	Title	Lyrics	Music	Producers	Length
1.	"Dreamlover"		Carey; Dave Hall	Carey; Hall; Afanasieff	3:54
2.	"Hero"				4:19
3.	"Anytime You Need a Friend"				4:26
4.	"Music Box"				4:57
5.	"Now That I Know"		Carey; Robert Clivillés; David Cole	Clivillés; Cole; Carey	4:19
6.	"Never Forget You"	Carey; Babyface	Carey; Babyface	Babyface; Carey; Daryl Simmons	3:46
7.	"Without You"	Pete Ham; Tom Evans	Ham; Evans	Afanasieff; Carey	3:36
8.	"Just to Hold You Once Again"				3:59
9.	"I've Been Thinking About You"	Carey; Cole	Carey; Clivillés; Cole	Clivillés; Cole; Carey	4:48
10.	"All I've Ever Wanted"				3:51
Total length:					41:55

International and 2023 edition bonus track
No.	Title	Length
11.	"Everything Fades Away"	5:25
Total length:		47:20

30th anniversary edition disc two: bonus tracks
No.	Title	Writer(s)	Producers	Length
1.	"All I Live for" (extended version)			4:28
2.	"Endless Love" (with Luther Vandross)	Lionel Richie	Afanasieff	4:20
3.	"Do You Think of Me"	Carey; Mark C. Rooney; Mark Morales; Afanasieff	Carey; Morales; Afanasieff	4:46
4.	"Workin' Hard"	Carey; Clivillés; Cole	Carey; Clivillés; Cole	3:29
5.	"My Prayer"	Georges Boulanger; Jimmy Kennedy		2:50
6.	"Hero" (2009 version)			4:18
7.	"Anytime You Need a Friend" (extended mix)			5:21
8.	"Music Box" (acapella)			4:42
9.	"Dreamlover" (live from Top of the Pops)	Carey; Dave Hall		3:04
10.	"Without You" (live from Top of the Pops)	Ham; Evans		2:52
11.	"Dreamlover" (Def Club Mix)	Carey; Hall	Carey; Afanasieff; Hall	10:44
12.	"Anytime You Need a Friend" (C&C Club version)		Carey; Clivillés; Cole; Afanasieff	10:53
13.	"Anytime You Need a Friend" (Soul Convention remix)			4:51
14.	"I've Been Thinking About You" (Terry Hunter remix)	Carey; Clivillés; Cole	Carey; Clivillés; Cole; Terry Hunter	6:30
15.	"Workin' Hard" (Terry Hunter remix)	Carey; Clivillés; Cole	Carey; Clivillés; Cole; Hunter	6:35
Total length:				79:43

30th anniversary edition disc three: Live at Proctor's Theatre, NY - 1993
No.	Title	Writer(s)	Length
1.	"Emotions"	Carey; Cole; Clivillés	4:18
2.	"Hero"		4:17
3.	"Someday"	Carey; Ben Margulies	3:58
4.	"Without You"	Ham; Evans	4:21
5.	"Make It Happen"	Carey; Cole; Clivillés	4:31
6.	"Dreamlover"	Carey; Hall	4:03
7.	"Love Takes Time"	Carey; Margulies	3:55
8.	"Anytime You Need a Friend"		3:51
9.	"Vision of Love"	Carey; Margulies	4:00
10.	"I'll Be There"	Berry Gordy; Bob West; Willie Hutch; Hal Davis	4:26
Total length:			41:40

30th anniversary Japanese edition disc four: bonus DVD
No.	Title	Writer(s)	Length
1.	"This Is Mariah Carey"		58:47
2.	"Special Interview (1993)"		8:52
3.	"Hero" (music video)		4:24
4.	"Dreamlover" (music video)	Carey; Hall	4:05
5.	"Without You" (music video)	Ham; Evans	4:23
6.	"Anytime You Need a Friend" (music video)		4:23
7.	"Hero" (live at Tokyo Dome)		4:25
Total length:			89:19

=== Notes ===
- "Without You" is a Badfinger cover (1970).
- "Endless Love" is a Diana Ross and Lionel Richie cover (1981).
- "My Prayer" is a The Platters cover (1956).
- The Latin American edition includes the bonus track bonus track Héroe.

=== Sample credits ===
- "Dreamlover" contains a sample of The Emotions's "Blind Alley" (1972).
- "I've Been Thinking About You" contains a sample of Melvin Bliss's "Synthetic Substitution" (1973) and Slave's "Just a Touch of Love" (1979).

== Personnel ==
Adapted from its liner notes

=== Musicians ===
- Mariah Carey – lead vocals, background vocals
- Walter Afanasieff – keyboards, additional keyboards, synthesizers
- Dave Hall – synthesizers, keyboards, rhythm programming
- David Cole – keyboards
- Babyface – keyboards, percussion, background vocals
- Ren Klyce – Akai and Roland programming
- Gary Cirimelli – MacIntosh and synthesizer programming
- Ricky Crespo – programming
- Shawn Lucas – programming
- James T. Alfano – programming
- Michael Landau – guitars
- Kayo – bass
- Robert Clivillés – drums, percussion
- Mark C. Rooney – background vocals
- Cindy Mizelle – background vocals
- Melonie Daniels – background vocals
- Kelly Price – background vocals
- Shanrae Price – background vocals

=== Production ===
- Mariah Carey – arranger
- Dave Hall – arranger
- Walter Afanasieff – arranger
- Robert Clivilles – arranger
- David Cole – arranger
- Babyface – arranger
- Bob Rosa – engineer, mix engineer
- David Gleeson – engineer
- Dana Jon Chappelle – engineer, vocal engineering
- Acar Key – engineer
- Frank Filipetti – engineer
- Jim Zumpano – engineer
- Jim Caruana – 2nd engineer
- Jen Monnar – 2nd engineer
- Kent Matcke – 2nd engineer
- Mark Krieg – 2nd engineer
- Kirk Yano – additional tracking engineer
- Mick Guzauski – mixing
- Bob Ludwig – mastering, Gateway Master Studios

== Charts ==
=== Weekly charts ===
Weekly chart performance
Chart (1993–1996)	Peak position
Argentine Albums (CAPIF)	7
Australian Albums (ARIA)	1
Austrian Albums (Ö3 Austria)	1
Belgian Albums (IFPI Belgium)	1
Brazilian Albums (ABPD)	9
Canada Top Albums/CDs (RPM)	2
Canadian Albums (The Record)	5
Danish Albums (Hitlisten)	1
Dutch Albums (Album Top 100)	1
Dutch Albums (Stichting Nederlandse Top 40)	1
Estonian Albums (Eesti Top 10)	2
European Top 100 Albums (Music & Media)	1
Finnish Albums (Suomen virallinen lista)	1
French Albums (SNEP)	1
German Albums (Offizielle Top 100)	1
Hong Kong Albums (IFPI)	5
Hungarian Albums (MAHASZ)	4
Icelandic Albums (Tónlist)	1
Irish Albums (IRMA)	1
Italian Albums (Musica e dischi)	3
Japanese Albums (Oricon)	2
New Zealand Albums (RMNZ)	2
Norwegian Albums (VG-lista)	2
Portuguese Albums (AFP)	1
Scottish Albums (Official Charts)	1
South African Albums (IFPI)	2
Spanish Albums (PROMUSICAE)	2
Swedish Albums (Sverigetopplistan)	3
Swiss Albums (Schweizer Hitparade)	1
UK Albums (Official Charts)	1
UK R&B Albums (Official Charts)	1
UK Albums (MRIB)	1
US Billboard 200	1
US Top R&B/Hip-Hop Albums (Billboard)	1
US Top 100 Pop Albums (Cash Box)	1
US Top 75 R&B Albums (Cash Box)	1
Zimbabwean Albums (ZIMA)	1

Weekly chart performance
Chart (2020–2024)	Peak position
Belgian Albums (Ultratop Wallonia)	120
Greek Albums (IFPI)	37
Japan Hot Albums (Billboard Japan)	53
Scottish Albums (OCC)	53
UK Album Downloads (Official Charts)	45
UK R&B Albums (Official Charts)	2
US Top Album Sales (Billboard)	41

Weekly chart performance for the 30th anniversary edition
Chart (2024)	Peak position
Australian Vinyl Albums (ARIA)	14
Japanese Albums (Oricon)	45
Spanish Albums (PROMUSICAE)	42

=== Year-end charts ===
Year-end chart performance
Chart (1993)	Position
Australian Albums (ARIA)	33
Canada Top Albums/CDs (RPM)	21
Dutch Albums (Album Top 100)	18
Japanese Albums (Oricon)	23
New Zealand Albums (RMNZ)	30
Norwegian Christmas Period Albums (VG-lista)	7
UK Albums (OCC)	10
UK Albums (MRIB)	17
US Billboard 200	40
US Top R&B/Hip-Hop Albums (Billboard)	33

Year-end chart performance
Chart (1994)	Position
Australian Albums (ARIA)	1
Austrian Albums (Ö3 Austria)	1
Canada Top Albums/CDs (RPM)	10
Dutch Albums (Album Top 100)	1
European Top 100 Albums (Music & Media)	1
French Albums (SNEP)	3
German Albums (Offizielle Top 100)	1
Icelandic Albums (Tónlist)	1
Japanese Albums (Oricon)	12
New Zealand Albums (RMNZ)	2
Norwegian Winter Period Albums (VG-lista)	2
Swedish Albums (Sverigetopplistan)	10
Swiss Albums (Schweizer Hitparade)	1
UK Albums (OCC)	3
UK Albums (MRIB)	2
US Billboard 200	2
US Top R&B/Hip-Hop Albums (Billboard)	8

Year-end chart performance
Chart (1995)	Position
Australian Albums (ARIA)	88
Belgian Albums (Ultratop Wallonia)	60
Dutch Albums (Album Top 100)	53
European Top 100 Albums (Music & Media)	66
US Billboard 200	124

=== Decade-end charts ===
Decade-end chart performance
Chart (1990–1999)	Position
US Billboard 200	26

=== All-time charts ===
All-time chart performance
Chart	Position
US Billboard 200	87
US Billboard 200 (Women)	27

== Certifications and sales ==
Certifications and sales
Region	Certification	Certified units/sales
Argentina	—	95,284
Australia (ARIA)	12× Platinum	860,000
Austria (IFPI Austria)	2× Platinum	100,000^{*}
Belgium (BRMA)	2× Platinum	100,000^{*}
Brazil (Pro-Música Brasil)	Platinum	250,000^{‡}
Canada (Music Canada)	7× Platinum	700,000^{^}
Finland (Musiikkituottajat)	Gold	47,382
France (SNEP)	Diamond	1,000,000^{*}
Germany (BVMI)	2× Platinum	1,400,000
Hong Kong	—	80,000
Japan (RIAJ)	Million	2,600,000
Netherlands (NVPI)	6× Platinum	600,000^{^}
New Zealand (RMNZ)	Platinum	15,000^{^}
Norway (IFPI Norway)	8× Platinum	160,000^{‡}
Singapore (RIAS)	Platinum	110,000
South Korea	—	1,000,000
Spain (Promusicae)	4× Platinum	400,000^{^}
Sweden (GLF)	Platinum	100,000^{^}
Switzerland (IFPI Switzerland)	4× Platinum	200,000^{^}
Taiwan	—	320,000
United Kingdom (BPI)	5× Platinum	1,500,000^{^}
United States (RIAA)	Diamond	7,100,000 (Note: US sales as of November 2018)
Summaries
Europe (Music & Media) sales	8× Platinum	8,000,000
Latin America	—	500,000
Worldwide	—	30,000,000
^{*} Sales figures based on certification alone.^{^} Shipments figures based on certification alone.^{‡} Sales+streaming figures based on certification alone.

== See also ==
- List of best-selling albums
- List of best-selling albums by women
- List of best-selling albums in the United States
- List of Billboard 200 number-one albums of 1993
- List of Billboard 200 number-one albums of 1994
- List of Billboard number-one R&B albums of 1993
- List of top 25 albums for 1994 in Australia
- List of European number-one hits of 1994
