= List of European number-one hits of 1994 =

This is a list of the European Music & Media magazine's European Hot 100 Singles and European Top 100 Albums number-ones of 1994.

Issue date	Song	Artist	Album	Artist
1 January	"I'd Do Anything For Love (But I Won't Do That)"	Meat Loaf	So Far So Good	Bryan Adams
8 January	"I'd Do Anything For Love (But I Won't Do That)"	Meat Loaf	So Far So Good	Bryan Adams
15 January	"I'd Do Anything For Love (But I Won't Do That)"	Meat Loaf	So Far So Good	Bryan Adams
22 January	"I'd Do Anything For Love (But I Won't Do That)"	Meat Loaf	So Far So Good	Bryan Adams
29 January	"All for Love"	Bryan Adams, Rod Stewart & Sting	So Far So Good	Bryan Adams
5 February	"All for Love"	Bryan Adams, Rod Stewart & Sting	So Far So Good	Bryan Adams
12 February	"All for Love"	Bryan Adams, Rod Stewart & Sting	So Far So Good	Bryan Adams
19 February	"All for Love"	Bryan Adams, Rod Stewart & Sting	So Far So Good	Bryan Adams
26 February	"All for Love"	Bryan Adams, Rod Stewart & Sting	So Far So Good	Bryan Adams
5 March	"All for Love"	Bryan Adams, Rod Stewart & Sting	So Far So Good	Bryan Adams
12 March	"All for Love"	Bryan Adams, Rod Stewart & Sting	So Far So Good	Bryan Adams
19 March	"All for Love"	Bryan Adams, Rod Stewart & Sting	So Far So Good	Bryan Adams
26 March	"Move on Baby"	Cappella	Music Box	Mariah Carey
2 April	"Streets of Philadelphia"	Bruce Springsteen	Music Box	Mariah Carey
9 April	"Streets of Philadelphia"	Bruce Springsteen	Music Box	Mariah Carey
16 April	"Streets of Philadelphia"	Bruce Springsteen	Music Box	Mariah Carey
23 April	"Streets of Philadelphia"	Bruce Springsteen	The Division Bell	Pink Floyd
30 April	"Streets of Philadelphia"	Bruce Springsteen	The Division Bell	Pink Floyd
7 May	"Streets of Philadelphia"	Bruce Springsteen	The Division Bell	Pink Floyd
14 May	"Streets of Philadelphia"	Bruce Springsteen	The Division Bell	Pink Floyd
21 May	"Streets of Philadelphia"	Bruce Springsteen	The Division Bell	Pink Floyd
28 May	"Without You"	Mariah Carey	The Division Bell	Pink Floyd
4 June	"Without You"	Mariah Carey	The Division Bell	Pink Floyd
11 June	"The Real Thing"	2 Unlimited	Music Box	Mariah Carey
18 June	"The Real Thing"	2 Unlimited	Music Box	Mariah Carey
25 June	"The Real Thing"	2 Unlimited	Music Box	Mariah Carey
2 July	"Baby, I Love Your Way"	Big Mountain	Music Box	Mariah Carey
9 July	"Love Is All Around"	Wet Wet Wet	Music Box	Mariah Carey
16 July	"Love Is All Around"	Wet Wet Wet	Music Box	Mariah Carey
23 July	"Love Is All Around"	Wet Wet Wet	Music Box	Mariah Carey
30 July	"Love Is All Around"	Wet Wet Wet	Voodoo Lounge	Rolling Stones
6 August	"Love Is All Around"	Wet Wet Wet	Voodoo Lounge	Rolling Stones
13 August	"Love Is All Around"	Wet Wet Wet	Voodoo Lounge	Rolling Stones
20 August	"Love Is All Around"	Wet Wet Wet	Voodoo Lounge	Rolling Stones
27 August	"Love Is All Around"	Wet Wet Wet	Voodoo Lounge	Rolling Stones
3 September	"Love Is All Around"	Wet Wet Wet	Voodoo Lounge	Rolling Stones
10 September	"Love Is All Around"	Wet Wet Wet	End of Part One: Their Greatest Hits	Wet Wet Wet
17 September	"Love Is All Around"	Wet Wet Wet	End of Part One: Their Greatest Hits	Wet Wet Wet
24 September	"Love Is All Around"	Wet Wet Wet	The 3 Tenors In Concert 1994	Carreras/Domingo/Pavarotti with Mehta
1 October	"Love Is All Around"	Wet Wet Wet	The 3 Tenors In Concert 1994	Carreras/Domingo/Pavarotti with Mehta
8 October	"Love Is All Around"	Wet Wet Wet	The 3 Tenors In Concert 1994	Carreras/Domingo/Pavarotti with Mehta
15 October	"Love Is All Around"	Wet Wet Wet	The 3 Tenors In Concert 1994	Carreras/Domingo/Pavarotti with Mehta
22 October	"Saturday Night"	Whigfield	Monster	R.E.M.
29 October	"Saturday Night"	Whigfield	Monster	R.E.M.
5 November	"Always"	Bon Jovi	Monster	R.E.M.
12 November	"Always"	Bon Jovi	Cross Road	Bon Jovi
19 November	"Always"	Bon Jovi	Cross Road	Bon Jovi
26 November	"Always"	Bon Jovi	Cross Road	Bon Jovi
3 December	"Always"	Bon Jovi	Cross Road	Bon Jovi
10 December	"Cotton Eye Joe"	Rednex	Cross Road	Bon Jovi
17 December	"Cotton Eye Joe"	Rednex	Cross Road	Bon Jovi
24 December	"Cotton Eye Joe"	Rednex	Cross Road	Bon Jovi
31 December	"Cotton Eye Joe"	Rednex	Cross Road	Bon Jovi

== See also ==
- 1994 in music
- List of number-one hits in Europe
