= Mariah Carey: Her Story =

Book by the British writer Chris Nickson

- Author: Chris Nickson
- Language: English
- Publisher: St. Martin's Griffin
- Publication date: June 1995
- Publication place: United States
- Pages: 153
- ISBN: 0-312-13121-6
- Dewey Decimal: 782.42164092
- LC Class: ML420.C2555 N5 1995
- Followed by: Mariah Carey Revisited: Her Story

Mariah Carey: Her Story is a book by the British writer Chris Nickson about the life and career of American singer Mariah Carey. St. Martin's Griffin first published it in June 1995. A sequel, Mariah Carey Revisited: Her Story, was released in October 1998.

== Critical reception ==
The 1995 edition received somewhat unfavorable reviews. Writing for Kliatt, librarian Elizabeth M. Mellett considered the book superficial. Andrew Hirst of the Huddersfield Daily Examiner called it "shallower than a child's paddling pool in a drought." According to Booklist's Mike Tribby, it is suitable for readers "interested in how she came to be but don’t want the distractions of a lot of deep, boring stuff".

The 1998 edition also attracted critical commentary. In Emerge, Lauren Adams De Leon said it "seems to rehash events of her short life, which have been covered ad nauseam". Publishers Weekly wrote: "Nickson's adoring prose makes clear that this is a book for fans only." Michael Ross of Vibe also viewed the book as favorable to Carey but felt it characterized her rise to fame adequately.
