= Why Mariah Carey Matters =

Book written by Andrew Chan

- Author: Andrew Chan
- Language: English
- Series: Music Matters
- Publisher: University of Texas Press
- Publication date: September 12, 2023
- Publication place: United States
- Pages: 145
- ISBN: 978-1-250-16468-1
- Dewey Decimal: 782.42164092 B
- LC Class: ML420.C2555 C53 2023

Why Mariah Carey Matters is a book written by Andrew Chan about the cultural impact of American singer Mariah Carey. University of Texas Press published it on September 12, 2023, as part of the Music Matters series.

== Critical reception ==
Why Mariah Carey Matters received positive reviews. Grouping it among three books essential for Carey's fans, Lorie Liebig of American Songwriter considered it "an entertaining and enlightening read". Library Journal reviewer Jessica Durham described the book as "an excellent look at a great artist." Similarly, Publishers Weekly viewed it as "a satisfying tribute to a dynamic and influential singer".

Chan's perspective was a topic of commentary. Publishers Weekly thought he showed reverence for Carey. Xtra Magazine's Daniel Lourenco said he offered a rational analysis despite being a fan of hers. Writing for The Millions, Jeromiah Taylor thought Chan crafted "an elegant balance of tone and writing as a critic, a reporter, and a memoirist all at once".

Critics commented on Chan's writing style about Carey. Taylor compared his "rigorous close-readings of her lyrics, voice, and performances" to the prose in Mythologies, a 1957 book by Roland Barthes. Durham favored the way his "beautiful descriptions of Carey's songs, lyrics, and performances aid in the difficult task of bringing sound to life solely through words". Citing the sentence "I like to picture her voice as a kind of cosmic seeker, stretching its tentacles into weird little pockets of sound", Publishers Weekly felt Chan's writing was occasionally overblown.

The amount of content in the book received reviews. Taylor considered Why Mariah Carey Matters short and Liebieg said it offered a comprehensive analysis of Carey's career. Durham likened it to an accessible version of a doctoral thesis. For Lourenco, the 145-page length "makes it almost impossible to fully assess a career as massive as" Carey's.
