= PC Muñoz =

American recording artist, drummer, producer, and writer

PC Muñoz is an American recording artist, drummer, producer, and writer based in the San Francisco Bay Area, primarily working in the contemporary classical, funk, pop, and avant-garde jazz genres.

== Career ==
Following a stint in the '90s band Alfred with cellist Zoë Keating, Muñoz's first commercial releases as a leader were The Trouble I’d Bring You (Beevine, 1998) and two albums with his band PC Muñoz and the Amen Corner: A Good Deed in a Weary World (Beevine, 2002) and California (Beevine, 2004), the latter featuring Rock and Roll Hall of Famer Jackson Browne on the title track. His first multimedia release, Twenty Haiku (Beevine Records / Talking House Productions, 2005), included Bay Area musicians Scott Amendola, Tammy Hall, Anthony Brown, and Blevin Blectum. In 2005 he also contributed a cover of Flesh for Lulu’s 1980s hit “I Go Crazy” to the album High School Reunion - A Tribute to Those Great 80's Films on American Laundromat Records.

In 2005 Muñoz co-founded the San Francisco audio production company and record label Talking House Productions with several music industry colleagues. While with Talking House, Muñoz produced the Grammy-nominated Strange Toys (Talking House Records, 2008) by composer/cellist Joan Jeanrenaud (formerly of Kronos Quartet) and released the solo album Grab Bag (Talking House Records, 2008) featuring Ingrid Chavez, Joan Jeanrenaud, and Doctor Fink. He also co-produced the EP Sweet Water Soul (Talking House Records, 2008) by the R&B artist FEMI. Muñoz again joined Jeanrenaud for Pop-Pop (Deconet, 2010), a duo album consisting entirely of cello and drums, and co-produced and played drums on Jeanrenaud's 4th solo album, Visual Music (Deconet, 2016).

In 2013 Muñoz created the touring performance project Half-Breed, an exploration of multiracial identity, during a fellowship with The Loft Literary Center in Minneapolis, Minnesota.

Muñoz released the digital album Physical Science (featuring Kyle Bruckmann and Bryan Dyer) along with the companion chapbook Inside Pocket of a Houndstooth Blazer in 2018. His writings have appeared in/on DRUM! Magazine, Seagate Creative, Scientific Learning, Grammy.com, Electronic Musician, and the anthology Indigenous Literatures from Micronesia (University of Hawai’i Press, 2019).

Muñoz annually programs live concerts for the Berkeley Art Museum and Pacific Film Archive (BAMPFA), including a live “re-imagination” of Carole King’s Tapestry album in 2018, and composes for film and dance, including several collaborations with San Francisco choreographer Robert Moses.
