= Chris Nickson =

British biographer, music critic (born 1954)

Chris Nickson (born 1954) is a British writer, novelist, music journalist, and biographer.

== Biography ==
Nickson was born in Leeds, West Yorkshire, but lived in the United States from the age of 21, returning to the UK in 2005. As a music journalist, he specialised in world and roots music. For several years he wrote a regular column for Global Rhythm magazine, and wrote The NPR Curious Listener's Guide to World Music. He contributes interviews and reviews to several music magazines and websites. He has written biographies of celebrities including Emma Thompson, Ewan McGregor, Mariah Carey, Soundgarden, Ozzy Osbourne, David Duchovny and Christopher Reeve. His biography of the late singer-songwriter John Martyn, Solid Air, published in 2006 was published as an ebook and as a paperback in June 2011.

In 2010, Nickson published his first novel, The Broken Token, set in Leeds in 1731. The next novel in the series, Cold Cruel Winter was published in the UK in May 2011 (September in the US), with the third, The Constant Lovers, published in 2012. All are part of the now longer Richard Nottingham series in the historical fiction/mystery genre. In May 2018, the Richard Nottingham series consisted of eight books, with Free from All Danger the most recent (published in February 2018).

Two books take place in Leeds in the 1950s: Dark Briggate Blues (2015) and its sequel, The New Eastgate Swing (2016); both feature private investigator Dan Markham.

Nickson's DI Tom Harper series which takes place in Leeds in the 1890s, now includes six books, with Tin God the most recent (published March 2018). According to Kirkus Reviews, this is "an excellent character-driven [police] procedural". The end of the Tom Harper series was marked by a special exhibition in Leeds. Both series are published by Severn House.

The Chesterfield series, published by The History Press, which takes place in England of the 1360s, consisted of three books. Another series, featuring WPC Lottie Armstrong in Leeds of the 20th Century, includes two books, Modern Crimes, published in September 2017 and The Year of the Gun, in February 2018 by The History Press.

Nickson's Web site discusses two other books published by The History Press, The Dead on Leave which takes place in England in 1936 and features war veteran Detective Sergeant Urban Raven and The Hanging Psalm, the first in a new series, featuring Simon Westow, a thief-taker in Leeds in 1820. Nickson also mentions the Seattle Mysteries, Emerald City and West Seattle Blues, featuring music journalist Laura Benton, available as audio books and e-books.

Most of Nickson's novels are set in and around Leeds. In 2015, he completed Leeds, the Biography: A History of Leeds in Short Stories which was published by Armley Press.

== Bibliography ==
=== Biographies ===
- Soundgarden: New Metal Crown (1995), St. Martin's Griffin, ISBN 978-0-312-13607-9
- Mariah Carey: Her Story (1995), St. Martin's Griffin, ISBN 978-0-312-13121-0
- Brad Pitt (1995), St. Martin's Paper, ISBN 978-0-312-95727-8
- Go, Ricki! (1996), Avon Books, ISBN 978-0-380-78473-8
- Keanu Reeves (1996), St. Martin's Paper, ISBN 978-0-312-95885-5
- Denzel Washington (1996), St. Martin's Paper, ISBN 978-0-312-96043-8
- The X-Factor: The Unauthorized Biography of X-Files Superstar David Duchovny (1996), Avon Books, ISBN 978-0-380-78851-4
- Emma: The Many Faces of Emma Thompson (1997), Taylor Publishing, ISBN 978-0-87833-965-5
- Melissa Etheridge (1997), St. Martin's Griffin, ISBN 978-0-312-15171-3
- Mariah Carey Revisited: The Unauthorized Biography (1998), St. Martin's Griffin, ISBN 978-0-312-19512-0
- Superhero: A Biography of Christopher Reeve (1999), Macmillan, ISBN 978-0-312-96980-6
- Ewan McGregor: An Unauthorized Biography (1999), Perigee, ISBN 978-0-312-96910-3
- Will Smith (1999), St. Martin's Paper, ISBN 978-0-312-96722-2
- Lauryn Hill: She's Got That Thing (1999), St. Martin's Paper, ISBN 978-0-312-97210-3
- David Boreanaz: An Unauthorized Biography (1999), St. Martin's Paper, ISBN 978-0-312-97361-2
- Matt Damon: An Unauthorized Biography (1999), Renaissance Books, ISBN 978-1-58063-072-6
- Ozzy Knows Best: The Amazing Story of Ozzy Osbourne (2002), St. Martin's Griffin, ISBN 978-0-312-31141-4
- Hey Ya!: The Unauthorized Biography of Outkast (2004), St. Martin's Griffin, ISBN 978-0-312-33735-3
- Usher: The Godson of Soul (2005), Simon Spotlight, ISBN 978-1-4169-0922-4
- Solid Air: The Life of John Martyn (2011), Liaison Music, Ltd., ISBN 978-0-615-53485-5

=== Music ===
- The NPR Curious Reader's Guide to World Music (2004), Macmillan, ISBN 978-0-399-53032-6
- Emerald City (Audible Audio Edition) (2013), Creative Content Ltd., ASIN B00C3VAMY8
- West Seattle Blues (Audible Audio Edition) (2014), Creative Content Ltd.
- Emerald City (eBook Edition) (2013), Creative Content Ltd., ISBN 978-1-908-807-083
- West Seattle Blues (eBook Edition) (2014), Creative Content Ltd. ISBN 978-1-908-807-250

=== Historical Mysteries ===
- The Crooked Spire (2013), The History Press, ISBN 978-0-7524-9917-8

The following works are set in 1730s Leeds and feature Richard Nottingham, Constable of the city.

- The Broken Token (2010), Creme de la Crime, ISBN 978-0-9560566-1-0
- Cold Cruel Winter (2011), Creme de la Crime, ISBN 978-1-78029-005-8
- The Constant Lovers (2012), Creme de la Crime, ISBN 978-1-78029-518-3
- Come the Fear (2012), Creme de la Crime, ISBN 978-1-78029-030-0
- At the Dying of the Year (2013), Creme de la Crime, ISBN 978-1-78029-042-3
- Convalescence (Kindle Edition) (2013), Amazon Digital Services, ASIN B00E0F9JJ4
- Fair and Tender Ladies (2014), Creme de la Crime, ISBN 978-1-78029-055-3
