= Mariah Carey videography =

Videos and media by American singer-songwriter

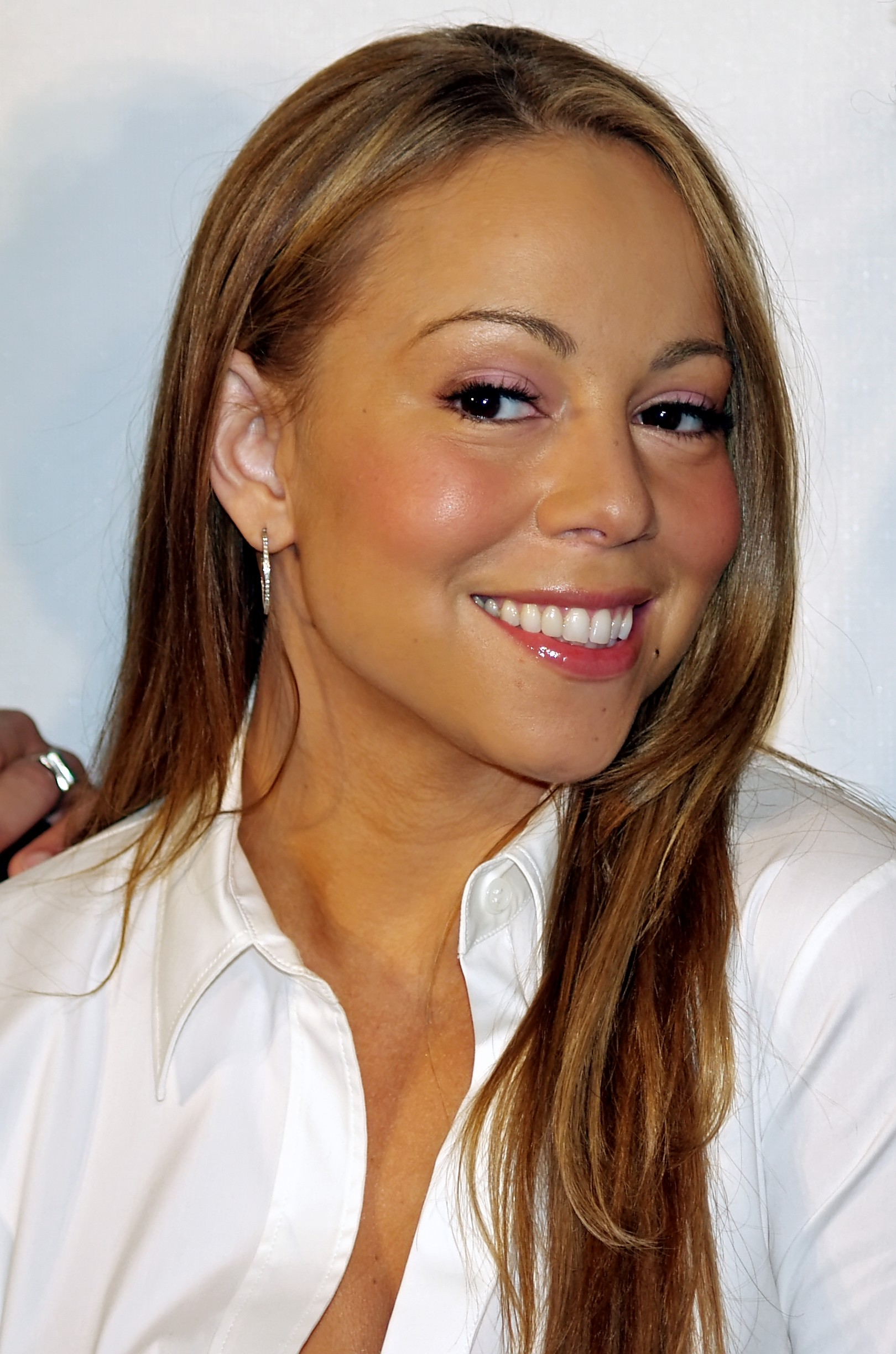
- Carey attending the premiere of Tennessee at the 2008 Tribeca Film Festival.
- Music videos: 133 (Note: Includes remix, alternate, director-cut and live videos.)
- Lyric videos: 6
- Home videos: 8
- Film appearances: 17
- Television appearances: 9 (Note: Saturday Night Live is counted as one appearance despite Carey making four appearances on the show in the years 1990–2008.)

American singer Mariah Carey has had an extensive career in film and television throughout her career including multiple music videos, starring in feature films, and several television appearances. After filming and directing multiple music videos for well-acclaimed songs throughout the 1990s, such as "Fantasy", Carey made her big-screen debut in the rom-com, The Bachelor (1999). In 2001, Carey starred in Glitter which followed the story of Billie Frank, a young woman rising to fame as a pop-star, and was released on September 21, 2001. It was a major commercial failure and critical flop being ranked number 21 on IMDb's Bottom 100 Movies of All Time. Despite her initial start, she went on to appear in films WiseGirls (2002), State Property 2 (2005) and Tennessee (2008) with supporting roles. The latter film received higher praise with Carey's role as Krystal, an aspiring young singer, being called "surprisingly effective". Despite the film's mixed reviews, Carey's performance as Raychel in WiseGirls was also given favourable reviews in comparison to her role as Billie Frank in Glitter.

In 2009, Carey starred in Lee Daniels' film Precious as Ms. Weiss, a social worker, which earned her multiple awards and nominations including a win for the Palm Springs International Film Festival Breakthrough Performance Award. Precious was deemed by some to be Carey's comeback and "return to acting". Daniels enlisted her again for his historical drama film, The Butler (2013) which earned her a second nomination for Screen Actors Guild Award for Outstanding Performance by a Cast in a Motion Picture. That same year, she appeared as a judge on the twelfth season of the singing competition television series American Idol alongside Nicki Minaj, Randy Jackson and Keith Urban. In 2018, she also appeared as a key advisor on fifteenth season of The Voice.

In December 2016, Carey starred in her first docu-series, Mariah's World which premiered on the E! cable network. The show followed Carey's Sweet Sweet Fantasy Tour around Europe and her then-plans to get married. The series struggled with ratings and was cancelled after one season. Since 2015, Carey has gone on to reinvent her image as the "de facto Christmas-time hostess" with multiple Christmas specials including Hallmark Channel's A Christmas Melody (2015) which marked her directorial debut, and Apple TV's Mariah Carey's Magical Christmas Special (2020).

Carey has also lent her voice to many animated films, most notably The Star (2017) and The Lego Batman Movie (2017). She has also made cameo appearances in numerous films, her first being in Death of a Dynasty (2003) and later on in Girls Trip (2017) among several others. Carey has also recorded theme music for different films and shows such as "When You Believe" from The Prince of Egypt (1998) soundtrack with Whitney Houston, "Almost Home" from Oz the Great and Powerful (2013), "In the Mix" from Mixed-ish (2019), and "The Star from the 2017 film of the same name which was nominated for the Best Original Song at the 75th Golden Globe Awards.

Having worked with numerous artists throughout her career such as Ol' Dirty Bastard, Justin Bieber, Nicki Minaj, Boyz II Men and Ariana Grande, Carey has accumulated over one billion views on her Vevo account. Her music videos have been given high praise with Vogue stating that "since bursting onto the scene in the 1990s, [Carey] has evolved from the American girl next door (jeans and a T-shirt were her staples) to a sultrier, more glamorous aesthetic, complete with a wind machine blowing at all times". Carey has been nominated three times for an MTV Video Music Award for Best Female Video, for the videos "Honey (Bad Boy Remix)", "We Belong Together" and "Touch My Body". In 2021, Carey was honoured at the African American Film Critics Association with a Special Achievement Innovator Award for her "visual storytelling in her music videos and specials".

== Music videos ==
=== 1990s ===
Key
•	Denotes music videos directed or co-directed by Mariah Carey

List of music videos, showing associated album, premiere date, other artists credited, director(s), producer(s), and description
Associated album	Title	Premiere date	Other artist(s)	Director(s)	Producer(s)	Description	Ref.
Mariah Carey	"Vision of Love"	July 1990	None	Bojan Bazelli	Ron Kay		
Mariah Carey	"Vision of Love" (Channel 4 Version)	1990	None	Unknown	Unknown		
Mariah Carey	"Love Takes Time"	October 1990	None	Jeb Brien; Wayne Maser	Ron Kay		
Mariah Carey	"Someday"	February 1991	None	Larry Jordan	Lexi Godfrey		
Mariah Carey	"Someday" (New 12" Jackswing)	1991	None	Unknown	Unknown		
Mariah Carey	"I Don't Wanna Cry"	May 1991	None	Larry Jordan	Kim Turner		
Mariah Carey	"I Don't Wanna Cry" (Alternative Version)	—N/a	None	Unknown	Unknown		
Mariah Carey	"I Don't Wanna Cry" (Director's Cut)	—N/a	None	Unknown	Unknown	Carey stated in 2015 that because there was a "hot guy" in the video and her dressing was very provocative, they made her reshoot many scenes.	
Mariah Carey	"There's Got to Be a Way"	May 1991	None	Larry Jordan	Unknown		
Emotions	"Emotions"	September 1991	None	Jeff Preiss	Debbie Samuelson		
Emotions	"Emotions" (12" Club Mix)	1991	None	Jeff Preiss	Unknown		
Emotions	"Can't Let Go"	December 1991	None	Jim Sonzero	David Ramser		
Emotions	"Make It Happen"	March 1992	None	Marcus Nispel	Anouk Frankel		
MTV Unplugged	"I'll Be There" (Live Video)	June 1992	Trey Lorenz	Larry Jordan	Unknown		
MTV Unplugged	"If It's Over" (Live Video)	July 1992	None	Larry Jordan	Unknown		
Music Box	"Dreamlover"	August 1993	None	Diane Martel	Gina Harrell		
Music Box	"Hero" (Live Video)	November 1993	None	Larry Jordan	Patti Lamanga		
Music Box	"Without You" (Live Video)	February 1994	None	Larry Jordan	Al Smith; Jack Gulick; Randy Hoffman		
Music Box	"Anytime You Need a Friend"	May 1994	None	Daniela Federici	Unknown		
Music Box	"Anytime You Need a Friend" (C+C Radio Mix)	1994	None	Daniela Federici	Unknown		
"Anytime You Need a Friend" – EP	"Anytime You Need a Friend" (Soul Convention Mix)	August 7, 2020	None	Mariah Carey	Unknown	Previously Unreleased but later released for #MC30 in 2020.	
Songs	"Endless Love"	1994	Luther Vandross	Unknown	Unknown		
Songs	"Endless Love" (Live Video)	1994	Luther Vandross	Unknown	Unknown		
Merry Christmas	"All I Want For Christmas Is You"	November 28, 1994	None	Diane Martel	Unknown		
Merry Christmas	"All I Want For Christmas Is You" (Alternative Version)	December 14, 1994	None	Unknown	Unknown		
Merry Christmas	"Miss You Most (At Christmas Time)"	1994	None	Diane Martel	Unknown		
Merry Christmas	"Joy to the World" (Live Video)	1994	None	Unknown	Unknown		
Daydream	"Fantasy" •	September 7, 1995	None	Mariah Carey	Unknown		
Daydream	"Fantasy" (Bad Boy Remix) •	October 1995	O.D.B	Mariah Carey	Unknown		
Daydream	"One Sweet Day"	November 1995	Boyz II Men	Larry Jordan	Tom Case		
Merry Christmas	"Joy to the World" (Celebration Mix)	December 1995	None	Unknown	Unknown		
Daydream	"Open Arms" (Live Video)	1996	None	Larry Jordan	Unknown		
Daydream	"El Amor Que Soñé" (Live Video)	1996	None	Larry Jordan	Unknown		
Daydream	"Always Be My Baby" •	March 1996	None	Mariah Carey	Ethan Wolvek		
Daydream	"Always Be My Baby" (Mr. Dupri Mix) •	May 1996	Da Brat; Xscape	Mariah Carey	Unknown		
Daydream	"Forever" (Live Video)	October 1996	None	Larry Jordan	Unknown		
Daydream	"Underneath the Stars"	November 13, 2020	None	Unknown	Unknown	Previously Unreleased (Released for #MC30)	
Butterfly	"Honey"	September 1997	None	Paul Hunter	Rubin Mendoza		
Butterfly	"Honey" (Bad Boy Remix)	September 1997	Mase; The Lox	Unknown	Unknown		
Butterfly	"Butterfly" •	October 1997	None	Daniel Pearl; Mariah Carey	Warren Hewlett; Dan Shea		
Butterfly	"Breakdown" •	February 1998	Krayzie Bone; Wish Bone	Mariah Carey; Diane Martel	Jack Gulick		
Butterfly	"The Roof (Back in Time)" •	March 1998	None	Mariah Carey; Diane Martel	Jack Gulick		
Butterfly	"My All"	1998	None	Herb Ritts	Debbie Kennard		
Butterfly	"My All/Stay Awhile" (So So Def Remix)	June 1998	Lord Tariq and Peter Gunz	Diane Martel	Unknown		
Butterfly	"Whenever You Call" (Live Video)	1998	none	Unknown	Unknown		
#1's	"Sweetheart"	October 1998	Jermaine Dupri	Hype Williams	Unknown		
#1's	"When You Believe"	November 16, 1998	Whitney Houston	Phil Joanou	Unknown		
#1's	"When You Believe" (Alternative Version)	December 13, 1998	Whitney Houston	Mary Lambert	Unknown		
#1's	"I Still Believe"	January 12, 1999	None	Brett Ratner	Erin Williams		
#1's	"I Still Believe/Pure Imagination" (Damizza Reemix) •	February 1999	Krayzie Bone; Da Brat	Mariah Carey	Unknown		
Rainbow	"Heartbreaker"	August 16, 1999	None	Brett Ratner	Unknown		
Rainbow	"Heartbreaker"	August 30, 1999	Jay-Z	Brett Ratner	Unknown		
Rainbow	"Heartbreaker" (Remix)	October 12, 1999	Da Brat; Missy Elliott; DJ Clue?	Diane Martel	Unknown		
Rainbow	"Thank God I Found You"	October 14, 1999	Joe; 98 Degrees	Brett Ratner	Steve Woroniecki; John Marshall		
Rainbow	"Thank God I Found You" (Make It Last Remix)	November 1999	Joe; Nas	Sanaa Hamri	Unknown		
Rainbow	"Thank God I Found You" (Alternative Version)	December 14, 1999	Joe; 98 Degrees	Unknown	Unknown		

=== 2000s ===
Key
•	Denotes music videos directed or co-directed by Mariah Carey

List of music videos, showing associated album, premiere date, other artists credited, director(s), producer(s), and description
Associated album	Title	Premiere date	Other artist(s)	Director(s)	Producer(s)	Description	Ref.
Rainbow	"Crybaby"	April 2000	Snoop Dogg	Sanaa Hamri	Unknown		
Rainbow	"Can't Take That Away (Mariah's Theme)"	April 2000	None	Sanaa Hamri	Unknown		
Rainbow	"Can't Take That Away (Mariah's Theme)" (Alternate Version)	2000	None	Sanaa Hamri	Unknown		
Rainbow	"Against All Odds (Take a Look at Me Now)" (Live Video)	2000	None	Unknown	Unknown		
Coast to Coast	"Against All Odds (Take a Look at Me Now)"	September 2000	Westlife	Unknown	Unknown	The music video features both Carey and Westlife and was shot around the island of Capri. It has an "in the recording studio" theme with shots of a lyric sheet and a mixing console alongside a cassette tape with the word "rough" written in red uppercase. After departing the studio, Carey listens to the cassette on a nearby yacht.	
Merry Christmas	"O Holy Night"	December 11, 2000	None	Sanaa Hamri	Unknown		
Greatest Hits	"All I Want for Christmas Is You" (So So Def Remix) (Animated Video)	December 18, 2000	Jermaine Dupri; Lil' Bow Wow	Unknown	Unknown		
Glitter	"Loverboy"	June 8, 2001	None	David LaChapelle	Unknown		
Glitter	"Loverboy" (Remix)	2001	Da Brat; Ludacris; Twenty II; Shawnna	David LaChapelle	Unknown		
Glitter	"Never Too Far"	August 17, 2001	None	Vondie Curtis Hall	Unknown	The music video is an excerpt from the film Glitter.	
Glitter	"Don't Stop (Funkin' 4 Jamaica)"	October 18, 2001	Mystikal	Sanaa Hamri	Steve Woroniecki		
Glitter	"Last Night a DJ Saved My Life"	2001	Busta Rhymes; Fabolous; DJ Clue?	Sanaa Hamri	Unknown		
Charmbracelet	"Through the Rain"	October 19, 2002	None	Dave Meyers	Craig Fanning; Ron Mohrhoff		
Charmbracelet	"Boy (I Need You)"	January 21, 2003	Cam'ron	Joseph Kahn	Greg Tharp		
It Ain't Safe; No More...	"I Know What You Want"	April 2, 2003	Busta Rhymes; Flipmode Squad	Chris Robinson	Unknown		
Charmbracelet	"Bringin' On the Heartbreak"	July 17, 2003	None	Sanaa Hamri	Unknown		
Kiss of Death	"U Make Me Wanna"	October 2004	Jadakiss	Sanaa Hamri	Haley Moffett		
The; Emancipation of Mimi	"It's Like That"	March 4, 2005	Jermaine Dupri; Fatman Scoop	Brett Ratner	Ron Mohrhoff		
The; Emancipation of Mimi	"We Belong Together"	April 11, 2005	None	Brett Ratner	Ron Mohrhoff		
The; Emancipation of Mimi	"Shake It Off"	July 26, 2005	None	Jake Nava	Ron Mohrhoff; Scott Kalvert		
The; Emancipation of Mimi	"Get Your Number"	October 5, 2005	Jermaine Dupri	Jaka Nava	Tom Fanning; Craig Fanning		
The; Emancipation of Mimi	"Don't Forget About Us"	November 1, 2005	None	Paul Hunter	Ron Mohrhoff; Rebecca Skinner		
Merry Christmas (2005 DualDisc)	"Santa Claus Is Comin' to Town 2005" (Claymation Video)	December 2, 2005	None	Mark Gravas	Unknown		
The; Emancipation of Mimi	"Say Somethin'"	April 10, 2006	Snoop Dogg	Paul Hunter	Rebecca Skinner; Ron Mohrhoff		
Fidel Cashflow 2006	"Don't Forget About Us" (Desert Storm Remix)	December 2006	DJ Clue? Fabolous; Styles P	Unknown	Unknown		
Strength & Loyalty	"Lil' L.O.V.E."	July 5, 2007	Bone Thugs-n-Harmony; Bow Wow	Chris Robinson	Meredith Welsch		
E=MC²	"Touch My Body"	February 27, 2008	None	Brett Ratner	Ron Mohrhoff; Rebecca Skinner		
E=MC²	"Bye Bye"	May 6, 2008	None	Justin Francis	Coleen Haynes; John Winter		
E=MC²	"I'll Be Lovin' U Long Time" (iTunes Solo Version)	July 3, 2008	None	Chris Applebaum	Tomer DeVito; John Hardin		
E=MC²	"I'll Be Lovin' U Long Time" (Remix)	July 3, 2008	T.I.	Chris Applebaum	Tomer DeVito; John Hardin		
E=MC²	"I Stay in Love"	October 27, 2008	None	Nick Cannon	Roger Ubina		
non-album video	"Right to Dream"	December 8, 2008	None	Aaron Woodley	Unknown		
The Ballads	"Hero 2009"	January 5, 2009	None	Unknown	Unknown	The video shows Carey recording the song in the studio. Scenes of New York City at night are also featured.	
E=MC²	"Love Story" •	February 8, 2009	None	Mariah Carey; Nick Cannon	Roger Ubina	The video stars both Carey and Cannon and commemorates their first wedding anniversary. They are featured together on a couch, in a swimming pool, and on an airplane. The video begins with the words "This is the love story of Nick and Mariah," and ends with "Happy anniversary, Nick and Mariah."	
Love vs. Money	"My Love"	March 9, 2009	The-Dream	Nick Cannon	Roger Ubina	The video depicts The-Dream as a superstar rapper and Carey as his love interest. She has braided hair and wears Air Jordans.	
Memoirs of an Imperfect Angel	"Obsessed"	July 14, 2009	None	Brett Ratner	Victor Alexander; Ron Mohrhoff	Shot in and around the Plaza Hotel in New York City, the video shows Carey dressed as herself as well as her own stalker—allegedly Eminem. At the end of the video, the stalker is struck by a bus. Cameo appearance by Patrick Demarchelier.	
Memoirs of an Imperfect Angel	"Obsessed" (Remix)	July 23, 2009	Gucci Mane	Brett Ratner	Ron Mohrhoff	In addition to scenes from the original music video, the remix shows Carey lounging on a wooden table while Gucci Mane stands next to her pouring champagne.	
Memoirs of an Imperfect Angel	"I Want to Know What Love Is"	November 16, 2009	None	Hype Williams	Tony McGarry; Hype Williams; Cisco Newman	Carey sings in the center of the field of a CGI Yankee Stadium while spectators look on. Towards the songs's climax, a gospel choir accompanies Carey on the field.	
Memoirs of an Imperfect Angel	"H.A.T.E.U."	December 8, 2009	None	Brett Ratner	Unknown	Shot on a beach in Malibu, the slow-motion music video shows an emotional Carey in various bathing suits.	

=== 2010s ===
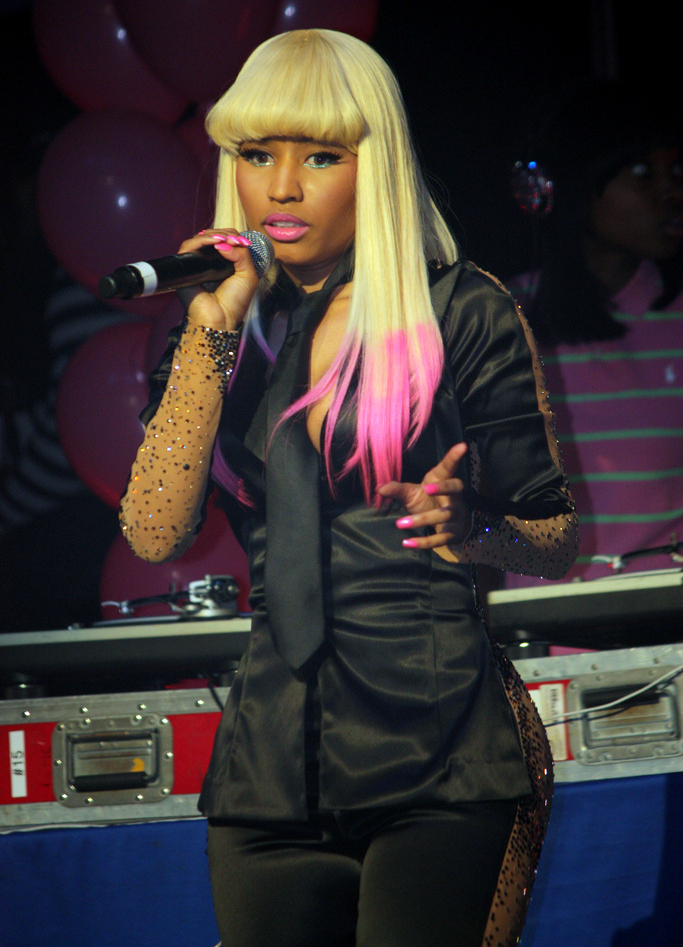
Nicki Minaj appears in the "Up Out My Face" (Remix) video.

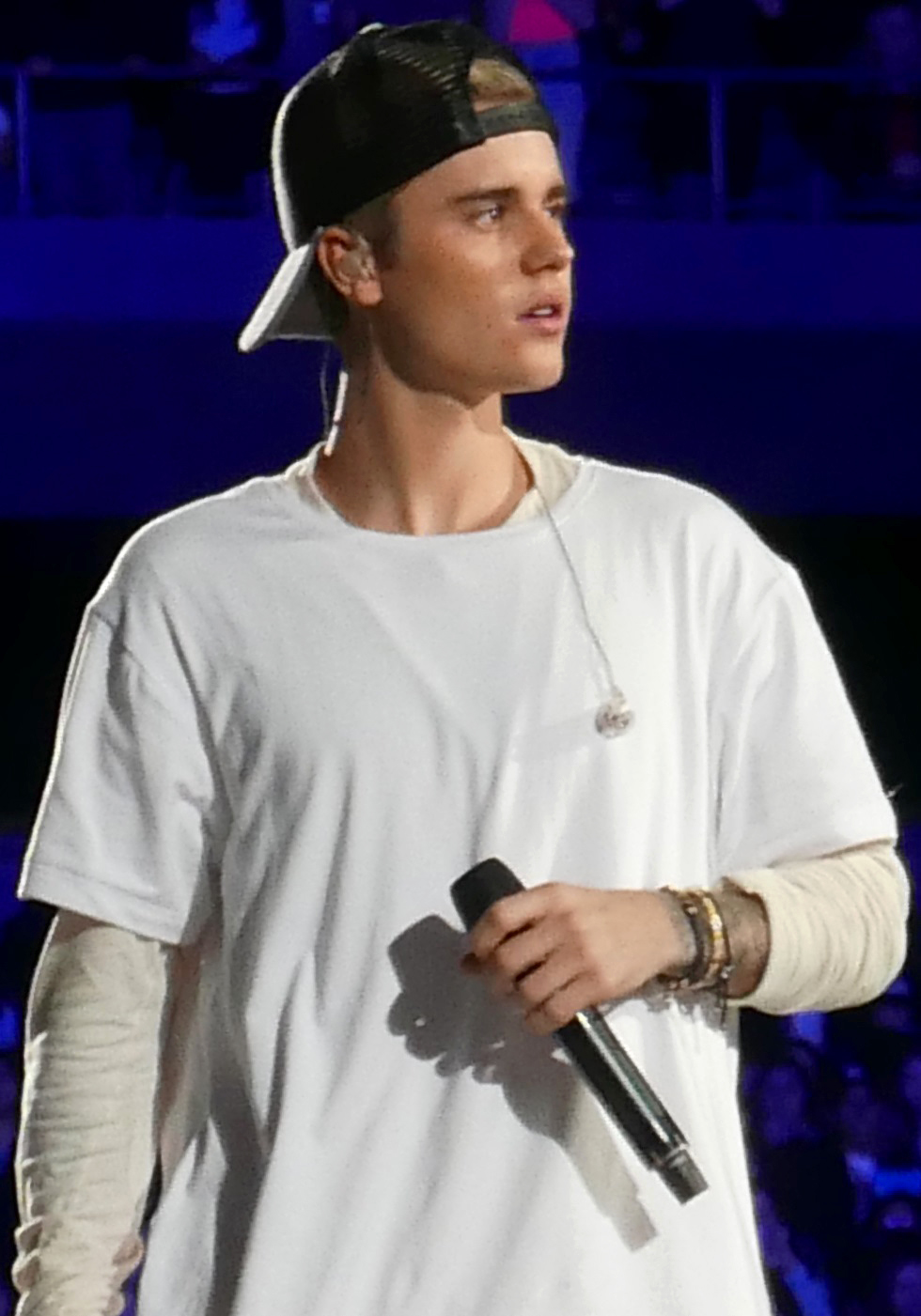
Justin Bieber joins Carey in the "All I Want for Christmas Is You (SuperFestive!)" video.

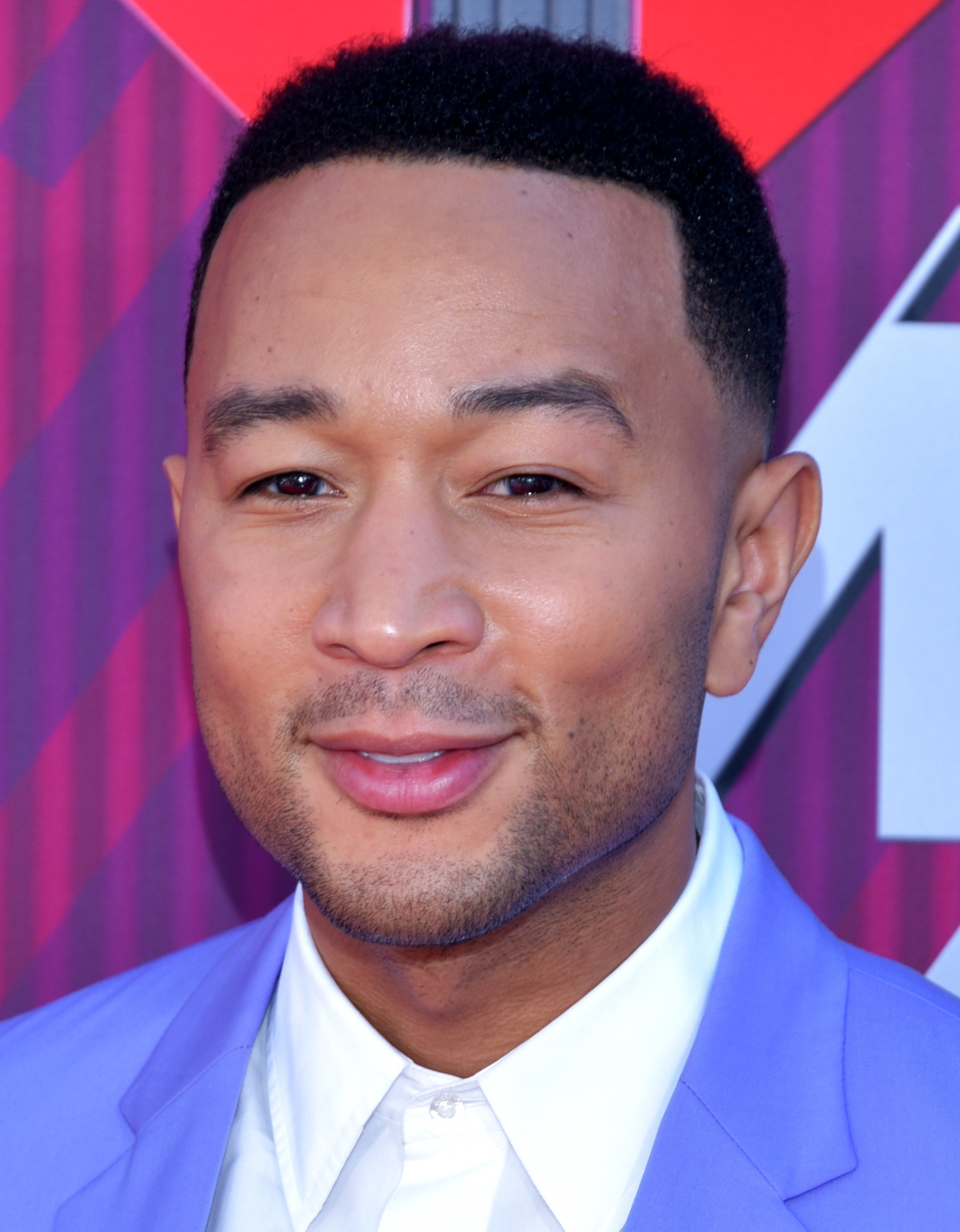
John Legend appears alongside Carey in the "When Christmas Comes" music video.

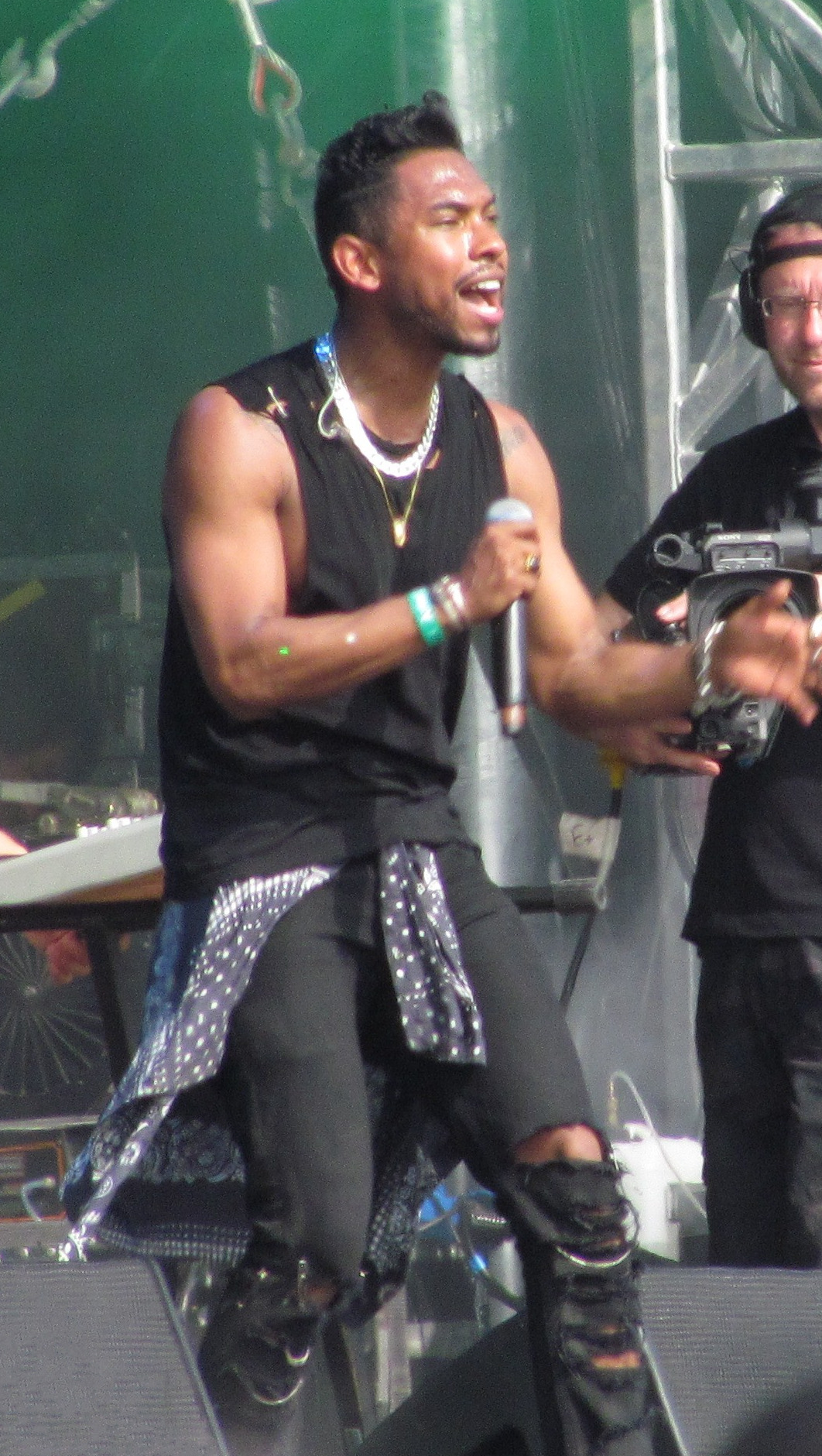
Miguel appears with Carey in the music videos for "#Beautiful" and the Spanglish remix "#Hermosa.

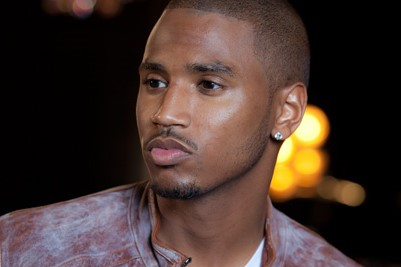
Trey Songz makes a cameo appearance in the video for "You're Mine (Eternal)" and appears alongside Carey in the video for the song's remix.

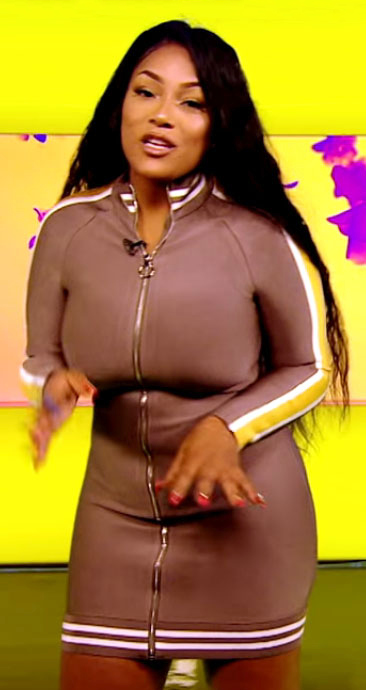
Stefflon Don is featured in the first "A No No" (Remix) music video.

Key
•	Denotes music videos directed or co-directed by Mariah Carey

List of music videos, showing associated album, premiere date, other artists credited, director(s), producer(s), and description
Associated album	Title	Premiere date	Other artist(s)	Director(s)	Producer(s)	Description	Ref.
Angels Advocate (unreleased)	"Up Out My Face" (Remix)	January 28, 2010	Nicki Minaj	Nick Cannon	Unknown	The video has a red and white color scheme. Carey and Minaj play different characters, including Barbie dolls who escape from their boxes. Carey's doll box has "She sings" written on the front, while Minaj's says "She raps." Cannon makes a cameo appearance.	
Angels Advocate (unreleased)	"Angels Cry" (Remix)	January 28, 2010	Ne-Yo	Nick Cannon	Unknown	The music video shows Carey and Ne-Yo in the studio recording the song. Scenes of Carey in an alley with pouring rain are also featured.	
AT&T Team USA Soundtrack	"100%" (Live Video)	February 20, 2010	None	Unknown	Unknown		
non-album video	"Everybody Hurts" (as part of Helping Haiti)	March 7, 2010	Helping Haiti	Joseph Kahn	Unknown	On January 12, 2010, a massive earthquke hit the island of Haiti, causing unimaginable suffering and desvastation for its people. Some of the biggest names in UK and American music have joined forces to record an emotive cover of the REM classic 'Everybody Hurts', to raise money for charities supporting the relief efforts in Haiti. The line up of featured artists is; Leona Lewis, Mariah Carey, Jon Bon Jovi, Robbie Williams, Kylie, Rod Stewart, Alexandra Burke, Miley Cyrus, Take That, Joe McElderry, Cheryl Cole, JLS, Mika, Michael Bublé, James Blunt, James Morrison, Susan Boyle, and Westlife.	
Merry Christmas II You	"Oh Santa!"	November 2, 2010	None	Ethan Lader	Roger Ubina	The video portrays Carey as a performer on a fictional 1950s Christmas television show. She is backed by a band, dancers, cheerleaders, and other singers.	
Merry Christmas II You	"O Come All Ye Faithful/Hallelujah Chorus" •	November 29, 2010	Patricia Carey	Mariah Carey	Unknown	Carey and her mother sing in a Christmas-decorated studio. Footage of Carey's past holidays are also featured. Nick Cannon makes a cameo appearance.	
Merry Christmas II You	"Auld Lang Syne (The New Year's Anthem)" • (Fireworks Version)	December 15, 2010	None	Mariah Carey	Unknown	Carey is dressed in a black dress and has diamond jewelry on. She sings the song in front of a green screen with fireworks exploding.	
Under the Mistletoe	"All I Want for Christmas Is You (SuperFestive!)" (Shazam Version)	November 30, 2011	Justin Bieber	Sanaa Hamri	Nicole Acacio	Filmed in Macy's Herald Square, the video features Carey singing the song in a Santa suit while Bieber stuffs items into shopping carts. At the end of the video, they hand out presents to fans.	
Merry Christmas II You	"When Christmas Comes"	December 13, 2011	John Legend	Sanaa Hamri	Unknown	Carey and Legend throw a celebratory Christmas party in her Beverly Hills home. Nick Cannon and Carey's children make cameo appearances. Excerpts from A Charlie Brown Christmas also appear.	
Merry Christmas II You	"Charlie Brown Christmas"	December 24, 2011	None	Unknown	Unknown		
non-album video	"Triumphant (Get 'Em)"	August 21, 2012	Rick Ross; Meek Mill	Nick Cannon	Nick Cannon	The video takes place in a boxing ring in which Carey is the ring girl. Mill plays the role of the boxer while Ross is a part of his entourage. DJ Khaled makes a cameo appearance.	
Merry Christmas II You	"Christmas Time Is in the Air Again" (Lyric Video)	December 14, 2012	None	Danielle Charles	Unknown		
non-album video	"Almost Home"	March 8, 2013	None	David LaChapelle	Kim Dellara; Ron Mohrhoff	The video combines clips of Carey singing in a black gown and scenes from the film Oz the Great and Powerful.	
Me. I Am Mariah... The Elusive Chanteuse	"#Beautiful"	May 9, 2013	Miguel	Joseph Kahn	Ron Mohrhoff; Kim Dellara	Carey and Miguel ride on a motorcycle while she runs her hands through the air. Afterwards, she dances in a chandelier-filled barn while Miguel watches from the front seat of a red Porsche Speedster.	
Me. I Am Mariah... The Elusive Chanteuse	"#Beautiful" (Explicit Version)	May 29, 2013	Miguel	Joseph Kahn	Ron Mohrhoff	The explicit version video features scenes of Carey dancing in a yellow dress inside of a chandelier-filled barn. Miguel watches from the front seat of a red Porsche Speedster.	
Me. I Am Mariah... The Elusive Chanteuse	"#Hermosa" •	July 1, 2013	Miguel	Mariah Carey	Unknown	The vintage-style video features Carey walking in Capri and visiting the Blue Grotto with Miguel.	
Me. I Am Mariah... The Elusive Chanteuse	"#Beautiful" (Remix)	Unreleased	Jeezy	Nick Cannon	Unknown	Editing of the video was completed on July 23, 2013, but the video was never released.	
Me. I Am Mariah... The Elusive Chanteuse	"You're Mine (Eternal)"	February 12, 2014	None	Indrani	Unknown	The video features a glitter-covered Carey singing in the El Yunque National Forest in Puerto Rico. Trey Songz makes a cameo appearance as her love interest.	
Me. I Am Mariah... The Elusive Chanteuse	"You're Mine (Eternal)" (Remix)	February 14, 2014	Trey Songz	Indrani	GK Reid	Carey sings in the El Yunque National Forest in Puerto Rico. Trey Songz lies in a bed and models for the camera.	
#1 to Infinity	"Infinity" (Lyric Video)	April 26, 2015	None	Lorraine Campo; Samantha Lecca	Alex Peacock	An animated lyric video featuring butterflies flying in the sky forming an infinity symbol.	
#1 to Infinity	"Infinity"	June 2, 2015	None	Brett Ratner	Unknown	Carey swipes through selections on Match.com while lounging on a couch. Clips from her performance of the song during her #1 to Infinity residency in Las Vegas are also shown. Tyson Beckford and Jussie Smollett make cameo appearances.	
Empire: Original Soundtrack, Season 3	"Infamous"	October 5, 2016	Jussie Smollett	Unknown	Unknown		
non-album video	"I Don't" •	February 3, 2017	YG	Mariah Carey	Stella Bulochnikov; Mariah Carey; Adam Paul	The video shows Carey in suggestive outfits, on top of a car, giving the middle finger, and burning a wedding dress.	
The Star (Original; Motion Picture Soundtrack)	"The Star"	November 16, 2017	None	Unknown	Unknown	Carey sings cheerfully front of an animated moonlit sky and sunny desert. Excerpts from The Star also appear.	
Mariah Carey's; All I Want for Christmas Is You (Original Soundtrack)	"Lil Snowman"	December 8, 2017	None	Unknown	Unknown		
Caution	"GTFO"	September 13, 2018	None	Sarah McColgan	Unknown	Carey struts around a house in lingerie while drinking wine.	
Caution	"With You"	October 10, 2018	None	Sarah McColgan	Unknown	A black-and-white video showing Carey posing, walking, and driving in Los Angeles.	
Caution	"The Distance" (Lyric Video)	November 16, 2018	None	Unknown	Unknown		
Caution	"A No No" (Lyric Video)	December 4, 2018	None	Unknown	Unknown	An animated collage featuring scissors, snakes, and fire, among others.	
Caution	"A No No"	March 8, 2019	None	Sarah McColgan	Unknown	The music video takes place inside a moving graffiti-covered New York City subway car with Caution album covers visible as advertisements. Carey sings the song while passengers of diverse backgrounds join her on the train for an impromptu dance party with neon pink and blue lighting. Carey's children make a cameo appearance. There are whistle notes near the end of the music video that are not present on the studio version of the song.	
Caution	"A No No" (Remix)	March 22, 2019	Stefflon Don	Sarah McColgan	Unknown	The video features alternative subway car scenes in addition to those present in the original video. Stefflon Don raps on a subway platform with graffiti on its tile walls while diverse dancers freestyle on the platform until the subway car Carey is riding on passes by. Cameo appearance by Carey's children.	
Caution	"A No No" (Remix)	April 5, 2019	Shawni	Sarah McColgan	Unknown	In addition to those present in the original video, the second remix video features subway car scenes in which both Carey and Shawni are featured. Shawni raps alongside Carey during which they interact with each other while the train moves. Carey's children make a cameo appearance. There are whistle notes near the end of the video that are not present on the studio version of the song.	
non-album video	"In the Mix"	September 17, 2019	none	Unknown	Unknown		
Merry Christmas (Deluxe; Anniversary Edition)	"All I Want for Christmas Is You" (Unreleased Video Footage Version)	November 1, 2019	none	Unknown	Unknown		
Merry Christmas (Deluxe; Anniversary Edition)	"All I Want for Christmas Is You" (Make My Wish Come True Version)	December 20, 2019	none	Joseph Kahn	Unknown		

=== 2020s ===
Key
•	Denotes music videos directed or co-directed by Mariah Carey

List of music videos, showing associated album, premiere date, other artists credited, director(s), producer(s), and description
Associated album	Title	Premiere date	Other artist(s)	Director(s)	Producer(s)	Description	Ref.
The Rarities	"Save the Day"	September 12, 2020	Lauryn Hill	Unknown	Unknown	Recorded at the Billie Jean King National Tennis Center.	
The Rarities	"Out Here on My Own" (Lyric Video)	September 18, 2020	none	Unknown	Unknown		
Mariah Carey's Magical Christmas Special (Apple TV+ Original Soundtrack)	"Oh Santa!"	December 4, 2020	Ariana Grande; Jennifer Hudson	Hamish Hamilton; Roman Coppola	Unknown		
Mariah Carey's Magical Christmas Special (Apple TV+ Original Soundtrack)	"Oh Santa!" (Lyric Video)	December 9, 2020	Ariana Grande; Jennifer Hudson	Unknown	Unknown		
non-album video	"Fall in Love at Christmas"	November 5, 2020	Khalid; Kirk Franklin	Mariah Carey; Bryan Tanaka	Unknown		

== Video albums ==
List of video albums
Title	Release details	Peak chart positions							Certifications
Title	Release details	US Video	US Music Video	AUS Music DVD	JPN DVD	Spain Music DVD	UK Video	UK Music Video	Certifications
The First Vision	Released: January 22, 1991; Label: Sony Music Video; Format: VHS, LaserDisc, DVD	20	2	—	—	—	—	24	US: Platinum; CAN: Gold
MTV Unplugged +3	Released: May 26, 1992; Label: Sony Music Video; Format: VHS, VCD, DVD	9	1	—	—	—	—	1	US: Platinum
Here Is Mariah Carey	Released: November 30, 1993; Label: Columbia Music Video; Format: VHS, VCD, DVD	14	4	—	—	—	10	1	US: Platinum; FRA: Gold; UK: Gold
Fantasy: Mariah Carey at Madison Square Garden	Released: February 9, 1996; Label: Columbia Music Video; Format: VHS, DVD	9	1	—	—	—	40	2	US: Platinum; FRA: Gold; UK: Gold
Around the World	Released: April 27, 1999; Label: Columbia Music Video; Format: VHS, VCD, DVD	6	3	—	29	—	97	2	US: Platinum; BRA: Gold; UK: Gold
#1's	Released: December 7, 1999; Label: Columbia Music Video; Format: VHS, VCD, DVD	14	15	—	16	—	— (Note: #1's did not enter the UK Video chart, but peaked at number 87 on the DVD chart.)	17	US: Platinum; AUS: Platinum; FRA: Platinum; UK: Gold
The Adventures of Mimi	Released: November 16, 2007; Label: Universal Music DVD Video; Format: 2× DVD, 3× DVD, 2× Blu-Ray	—	1	26	75	8	—	10	US: Platinum; BRA: 2× Platinum
DVD Collection	Released: 2008; Label: Sony BMG Music Entertainment; Format: 2× DVD (box set) (Note: Fantasy: Mariah Carey at Madison Square Garden and #1's)	—	—	—	—	—	—	38	

== Video singles ==
List of video singles
Title	Release details	Peak chart positions	
Title	Release details	US Video	US Music Video
"My All"	Released: April 21, 1998; Label: Columbia Music Video; Format: VHS	31	6

== Filmography ==
Year	Title	Role	Notes
1999	The Bachelor	Ilana	Acting debut
2001	Glitter	Billie Frank	2001 Golden Raspberry Award for Worst Actress; Nominated – Golden Raspberry Award for Worst Screen Combo
2002	WiseGirls	Raychel	
2003	Death of a Dynasty	Herself	Cameo appearance
2005	State Property 2	Dame's Wifey	
2008	Tennessee	Krystal	
2008	You Don't Mess with the Zohan	Herself	Cameo appearance
2009	Precious	Mrs. Weiss	Palm Springs International Film Festival Breakthrough Performance Award; Capri Hollywood International Film Festival Award for Supporting Actress of the Year; Black Reel Award for Best Ensemble; Boston Society of Film Critics Award for Best Ensemble Cast; Nominated – Black Reel Award for Best Supporting Actress; Nominated – NAACP Image Award for Outstanding Supporting Actress in a Motion Picture; Nominated – Screen Actors Guild Award for Outstanding Performance by a Cast in a Motion Picture; Nominated – Broadcast Film Critics Association Award for Best Cast
2013	The Butler	Hattie Pearl	Nominated – Screen Actors Guild Award for Outstanding Performance by a Cast in a Motion Picture
2015	A Christmas Melody	Melissa	Carey also directed the film
2016	Popstar: Never Stop Never Stopping	Herself	Cameo appearance
2016	The Keys of Christmas	Herself	Cameo appearance
2017	The Lego Batman Movie	Mayor McCaskill	Voice
2017	Girls Trip	Herself	Cameo appearance
2017	The Star	Rebecca the hen	Voice
2017	Mariah Carey's All I Want for Christmas Is You	Herself / narrator	Voice; Executive Producer
2020	Mariah Carey's Magical Christmas Special	Herself	Executive Producer
2021	Mariah's Christmas: The Magic Continues	Herself	Executive Producer
2022	Mariah Carey: Merry Christmas to All!	Herself	Executive Producer

== Television ==
Year	Title	Role	Notes	Source(s)
1990–2008	Saturday Night Live	Musical Guest	"Patrick Swayze/Mariah Carey" (Season 16, Episode 4) "Linda Hamilton/Mariah Carey" (Season 17, Episode 6) "Claire Danes/Mariah Carey" (Season 23, Episode 6) "Jonah Hill/Mariah Carey" (Season 33, Episode 8)	
2002	Ally McBeal	Candy Cushnip	"Playing with Matches" (Season 5, Episode 8)	
2003	I Love the '80s Strikes Back	Herself	Miniseries, commentator	
2003	Amici di Maria De Filippi	Herself	Italian talent show, guest	
2004	The Proud Family	Herself (voice)	"Monkey Business" (Season 3, Episode 1)	
2013	American Idol	Judge	Season 12	
2013	American Dad!	Gina's Replacement Waitress (voice)	"Max Jets" (Season 9, Episode 11)	
2013	American Dad!	Laura (voice)	"Kung Pao Turkey" (Season 10, Episode 5)	
2016	Empire	Kitty	"What Remains Is Bestial" (Season 3, Episode 3)	
2016	Mariah's World	Herself		
2018	The Voice	Herself	Key Advisor in the fifteenth season.	
2026	The Proud Family: Louder and Prouder	Herself (voice)		
