= Caution (Mariah Carey album) =

Studio album by Mariah Carey
- Released: November 16, 2018
- Recorded: January–August 2018
- Studios: Cha Cha (Beverly Hills); Chalice (Los Angeles); Electric Lady (New York City); Murray Soundlab (Kennesaw); Sanctuary (Albany, Bahamas); Studio at the Palms (Las Vegas); Westlake (Los Angeles)
- Genres: R&B; pop; hip hop
- Length: 38:26
- Label: Epic
- Producers: Fred Ball; Mariah Carey; Dev Hynes; Angel Lopez; Lido; Daniel Moore II; Mustard; Nineteen85; No I.D.; Luca Polizzi; Poo Bear; Skrillex; SLMN; The Stereotypes; Shea Taylor; Timbaland; WondaGurl

Mariah Carey chronology
#1 to Infinity (2015)	Caution (2018)	The Rarities (2020)

Singles from Caution
- 1. "With You" Released: October 4, 2018; 2. "A No No" Released: March 4, 2019

Caution is the fifteenth studio album by American singer Mariah Carey. It was released on November 16, 2018, by Epic Records, her only studio album released by the label. Her first studio album in four years, Carey collaborated with Ty Dolla Sign, Slick Rick, Blood Orange, and Gunna on the album's songs and worked with a variety of producers. Musically, Caution is a R&B, pop and hip hop record. The album was supported by the singles "With You" and "A No No", as well as several promotional singles.

The album debuted at number five on the US Billboard 200, with 51,000 album-equivalent units in its first week, but performed moderately elsewhere, reaching the top-forty in Australia, Canada, Italy, Japan, and the United Kingdom. The album received critical acclaim, with many critics calling it Carey's most cohesive work in over a decade, and appeared on several year-end music lists of 2018. Carey embarked on the Caution World Tour in support of the album.

== Background ==
After the release of her fourteenth studio album, Me. I Am Mariah... The Elusive Chanteuse, Carey departed Def Jam Records and secured a multi-album record deal with Epic in January 2015, a subsidiary of Sony Music Entertainment. She subsequently came out with her sixth compilation album, #1 to Infinity, which includes the single "Infinity" and a residency deal to perform at The Colosseum at the Caesars Palace hotel in Las Vegas. In 2017, Carey released the single "I Don't", featuring American rapper YG, which peaked at number 89 on the US Billboard Hot 100. Carey also released the song "The Star", from the soundtrack for the movie of the same name, and was nominated in the Best Original Song category at the 75th Golden Globe Awards.

In January 2018, Carey confirmed that she had begun work on a new album. Carey finished the album in August 2018 when she recorded the title track "Caution". The track inspired Carey to change the record's original title Portrait to its official title Caution.

== Music and lyrics ==
Sure there are love songs and moments of inward reflection, but the majority of the tracks are kiss-offs aimed at those who have doubted her or left her scorned... While big, emotional ballads were the groundwork of Carey’s early years, there is only one truly heavy moment on the album: final song "Portrait." Following the lyrical curves, R&B coos and stellar production, it’s a starkly heavy moment that feels like a throwback to a bygone era of power ballads for vocalists of her calibre.

— Brittany Spanos, Rolling Stone

Consisting of 10 songs and two additional tracks featured exclusively on its Japanese issue, Caution is an R&B, hip hop and pop record that incorporates elements of EDM, psychedelia and Latin pop. Jumi Akinfenwa from Clash Magazine views the album as a "homage to the sounds prevalent at different stages of her [Mariah's] career". Mike Wass from Idolator hailed it as being "the new blueprint for legacy acts" such as Carey.

Writing for NOW Magazine, Kevin Hegge remarked that "despite the variety of styles, the most notable element of the album was its succinctness". Hegge further juxtaposed Carey's "collaborations with a handful of hot artists and producers" with the fact that she wasn't "pandering to trends" in her music. Similarly, Andrew Unterberger from Billboard summarized Caution as being "a resolutely mid tempo album", praising the production for being "uniform but not stagnant" in its "lush chillness and steady trending". Within his review, Unterberger took note of the "incredible roster of producers" credited on the album, describing them as "bending their trademark sonics" to fit into Carey's "pop-n-B comfort zone". Winston Cook-Wilson from Spin described the album's production as being the apotheosis of "trends in contemporary R&B music, absent its glitchier, experimental tendencies"; he did cite the track "Giving Me Life" as a notable exception to this rule.

Thematically, Caution has been described as "a concept album about relationships", featuring "songs about them falling apart, bops about new love and others that celebrate something more lasting". Leah Greenblatt of Entertainment Weekly similarly interpreted the album as being "a study in various degrees of incline". Nick Smith from MusicOMH felt that Carey was "at her most ethereal and reflective" on Caution, commenting that its overall narrative focused on the relationship the singer has with herself.

== Composition ==
The album opens with "GTFO", described as a "ghostly, tender record with a magnetic rhythm". Its EDM-influenced instrumentation is based around a sample of "Goodbye to a World" by Porter Robinson. In the song, Carey focuses on the aftermath of "a doomed relationship", her vocal delivery adding "a gratifying edge to the song’s delightful kiss-off hook". As noted by the critic Sal Cinquemani in a review for Slant Magazine, "beneath Mariah’s nonchalant delivery and kitschy patois... belies a heaviness that's perhaps informed by the song's apocalyptic source material". "With You" is a "velvety" classic R&B/soul ballad "built from little more than gospel piano and booming 808s". Its lyrics tell the story of a woman seeking safety and security in her potential partner's promises of unconditional love, with Carey viewing "romance with an open-eyed caginess".

The title-track "Caution" is a "sleek, pop-R&B hybrid", presenting Carey "on the amber traffic light; vulnerable and tentative, yet honest and hopeful about embarking on a new journey". Within the song, she considers the ephemerality of her current relationship before warning her lover to "proceed with caution", conflating the triviality of factors such as "material possessions" with her desire for her lover to "commit" to being her "everything". "A No No" is a "jagged, jazzy" hip hop track which "channels the spirit...and cadences...of TLC's "No Scrubs" while Carey exterminates "snakes in the grass" before musing on "the fact that no is the same across languages" in the song's bridge. The track itself notably contains a sample from "Rain Dance" by the Jeff Lorber Fusion, and "Crush on You" by Lil' Kim featuring The Notorious B.I.G. and Lil Cease. "The Distance" featuring Ty Dolla Sign is described as being "sleek, slow funk", with Carey speaking out against the detractors who doubted her relationship with her lover would "go the distance", setting the song during the "warm days" and "cold nights" of "late October".

"Giving Me Life", featuring Slick Rick and Blood Orange, is a psychedelia-inspired track that sees Carey admit that "a summertime love has her thinking back to being 17 and "feeling myself like I'm Norma Jeane". Lasting six minutes and 8 seconds, "she entices a lover to follow her "on another tangent" within a "big, dusky [musical] landscape" which eventually "dissolves into woozy, guitar-laced spaciousness" towards the end of the song. "One Mo' Gen" is a "bedroom anthem" that "evokes 90's R&B without sounding dated"; it sees Carey "throb with desire" over her and her lover's sexual chemistry. The Timbaland-produced "8th Grade" is an "old-school R&B" song where Carey "coos over crisp digital fingersnaps and mentholated synths", expressing an angst towards her lover's motivations.

The Gunna-assisted "Stay Long Love You" weaves "retro influences into a modern sound palette" containing heavy trap inflections, with Carey expressing desire through "a slightly quicker tempo and party vibe". Album-closer "Portrait" has been described as a "slow burning and vintage Mariah ballad". It sees the singer reveal "the inner emotional tension of having her own crosses to bear but wanting to keep them hidden from the world".

== Promotion ==
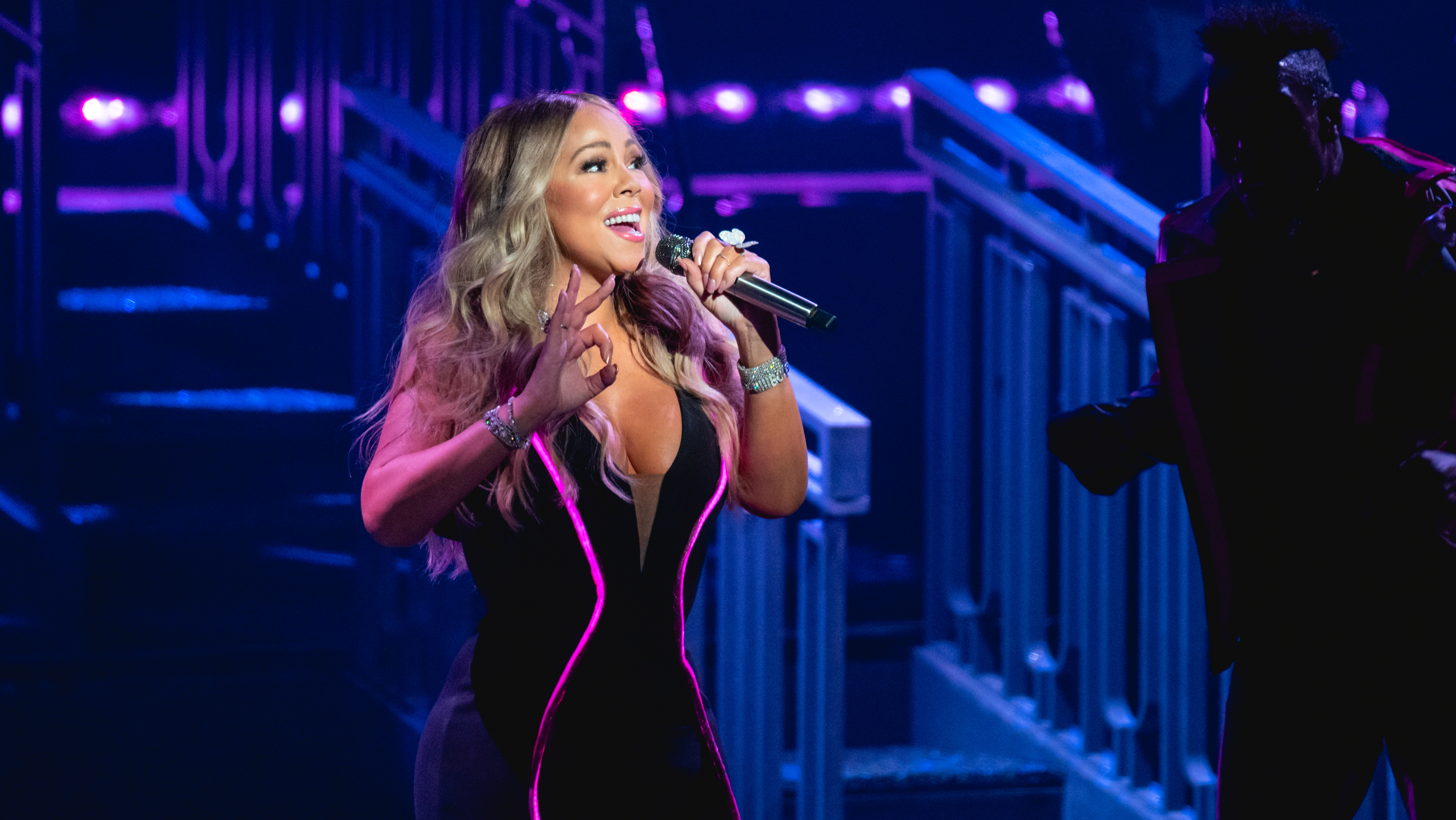
Carey during her Caution World Tour in Amsterdam, June 2019

Carey performed "GTFO" for the first time when she headlined the 2018 iHeartRadio Music Festival on September 21, 2018. Later, she performed the album's lead single "With You" at the 2018 American Music Awards on October 9, 2018. On November 16, 2018, Carey and American singer Ty Dolla Sign performed "The Distance" on The Tonight Show with Jimmy Fallon. On November 19, 2018, Carey also performed "With You" on Good Morning America. On May 1, 2019, Carey performed the album's second single "A No No" at the 2019 Billboard Music Awards along with a medley of "Always Be My Baby", "Emotions", "We Belong Together" and "Hero".

To promote the album, Carey embarked on the 35-date Caution World Tour, visiting Europe, North America, Asia, and South America.

=== Singles ===
"With You" was released as the album's lead single on October 4, 2018. Its music video, directed by Sarah McColgan, premiered on October 10, 2018, on her YouTube account. The song reached number seven on the US Adult Contemporary chart, becoming her 23rd top-ten hit on the chart. "A No No", initially released as a promotional single on November 1, 2018, was serviced to rhythmic contemporary and urban contemporary radio as the album's second single on March 4, 2019. Its music video, also directed by McColgan, premiered on March 8, 2019, and featured cameos from Carey's children and her then-boyfriend Bryan Tanaka. The song charted at number 17 on the US R&B Digital Songs chart.

==== Promotional singles ====
"GTFO" was released as the album's first promotional single from on September 13, 2018. It peaked at number four on the US R&B Digital Songs chart. "The Distance", which features American singer Ty Dolla Sign, succeeded it as the second promotional single from the album on October 18, 2018. It peaked at number thirteen on the US R&B Digital Songs chart.

"Portrait" was released as the album's second promotional single on May 24, 2024, as a four-track extended play, which includes a 16-minute remix of the song subtitled the "Hopeful Child Remix", after speaking about the songwriting process of the song for an episode of Audible Words + Music. The song's "Hopeful Child Remix" debuted at number 44 on the US Hot Dance/Electronic Songs chart, becoming her first appearance on the chart.

==== Other songs ====
"Runway", initially only available on the Japanese edition of the album, was released worldwide on June 24, 2022, for its digital re-release.

== Critical reception ==
Professional ratings
Aggregate scores
Source	Rating
AnyDecentMusic?	7.5/10
Metacritic	82/100
Review scores
Source	Rating
AllMusic	4/5 stars
Clash	8/10
Consequence of Sound	B−
Entertainment Weekly	B+
musicOMH	5/5 stars
Pitchfork	7.5/10
Rolling Stone	4/5 stars
Slant Magazine	3.5/5 stars
Sputnikmusic	3.5/5
The Sydney Morning Herald	4.5/5 stars

Caution was highly acclaimed by critics. At Metacritic, which assigns a normalized rating out of 100 to reviews from mainstream publications, Caution received an average score of 82, based on nine reviews, indicating "universal acclaim", which became the highest Metascore for any of Carey's albums. Maura Johnston from Pitchfork felt that the record represented a "celebration of the ultimate-diva status" of Carey's brand of music. Brittany Spanos from Rolling Stone summarised the record as being "pure hip-hop-leaning pop bliss", praising Carey's ability to deliver "an honest album, full of truths" through a "slow-burning R&B sound". Reviewing the album for AllMusic, Andy Kellman wrote that Carey's [themes of] "flirtatious enticement, celebration, reminiscence, perseverance, rejection" were "highly energized". MusicOMH gave it a score of all five stars and stated: "[Carey] is vulnerable and tentative, yet honest and hopeful about embarking on a new journey". Spencer Kornhaber from The Atlantic stated that the album "shores up the idea of Carey the wit, the craftswoman, and the game player".

The album also appeared on several year-end lists. Bianca Gracie from Billboard stated that the record signposted Carey as "a crafty songwriter and inimitable singer". Ranking atop Paper magazine's year-end list, Michael Love Michael commented on the significance of Caution's "tales of passion and peace" in a "politically fraught 2018", describing its ability to "resonate with women everywhere" through "the graceful pain of lived experience" as "a quiet, but nonetheless radical beauty". At the end of 2019, Caution appeared on Rated R&B's "50 Best R&B Albums of The Decade (2010s)" list.

=== Accolades ===
A summary of accolades by publication and rank
Publication	Accolade	Rank	Ref.
Billboard	The 50 Best Albums of 2018: Critics' Picks	39	
City Pages	The 5 Best Albums of 2018	5	
Complex	The Best Albums of 2018	48	
Fact	The 50 Best Albums of 2018	50	
Jenesaispop	The 50 Best Albums of 2018	49	
Paper	The 20 Best Albums of 2018	1	
Rolling Stone	The 20 Best Pop Albums of 2018	8	
Slant	The 25 Best Albums of 2018	12	
Slant	The 100 Best Albums of the 2010s	91	
Spin	The 51 Best Albums of 2018	12	

== Commercial performance ==
Caution opened at number five on the US Billboard 200 with 51,000 album-equivalent units, which included 43,000 pure album sales, becoming Carey's eighteenth top-ten album in the United States, but garnered her lowest first-week sales for a studio album to date. Additionally, Caution debuted at number one on the US Top R&B/Hip-Hop Albums chart, her eighth number-one album on the chart. It also debuted at number one on the US Top R&B Albums chart, becoming her second number-one album on the chart, with her first being Me. I Am Mariah... The Elusive Chanteuse (2014). Carey became the first artist in history to replace herself at number one on the Top R&B Albums chart, with Caution placing at number eight on the chart and her holiday album, Merry Christmas, reaching the top spot.

Outside the US, the album debuted and peaked at number 40 on the UK Albums Chart. The album became Carey's tenth number-one album on the UK R&B Albums chart, debuting at the top spot of the chart, replacing Eminem's Kamikaze for one week, and being replaced by that album on its second week. On Australia's ARIA Albums Chart, it entered and peaked at number 15, and peaked inside the top-twenty in Canada, Croatia, and Spain; the top-thirty in Japan, Greece and Portugal; and the top-forty in Belgium, Italy, the Netherlands, New Zealand, and Switzerland.

== Track listing ==
Caution – Standard edition
No.	Title	Lyrics	Music	Producer(s)	Length
1.	"GTFO"	Mariah Carey; Bibi Bourelly	Carey; Paul Jeffries; Jordan Manswell; Porter Robinson	Carey; Robinson; Nineteen85; Manswell^{[a]}	3:27
2.	"With You"	Carey; Charles Hinshaw	Carey; Greg Lawary; Dijon McFarlane	Carey; Mustard	3:47
3.	"Caution"	Carey; Hinshaw	Carey; Ernest Wilson; Mohamed Sulaiman; Luca Polizzi	Carey; No ID; SLMN; Luca	3:15
4.	"A No No"	Carey; Priscilla Hamilton	Carey; Hamilton; Robert Shea Taylor; Jeff Lorber; Kimberly Jones; Christopher Wallace; Mason Betha; Cameron Giles; Andreao Heard	Carey; Shea Taylor; Jermaine Dupri^{[b]}	3:07
5.	"The Distance" (featuring Ty Dolla Sign)	Carey; Tyrone Griffin Jr.	Carey; Griffin Jr.; Sonny Moore; Peder Losnegård; Jason Boyd	Carey; Skrillex; Lido; Poo Bear	3:27
6.	"Giving Me Life" (featuring Slick Rick and Blood Orange)	Carey; Ricky M.L. Walters	Carey; Devonté Hynes	Carey; Hynes	6:08
7.	"One Mo' Gen"	Carey	Carey; Frederick Ball; Ebony Oshunrinde; Boyd	Carey; Ball; WondaGurl; Boyd	3:25
8.	"8th Grade"	Carey	Carey; Timothy Mosley; Angel Lopez; Federico Vindver; Larrance Dopson; Boyd	Carey; Boyd; Timbaland; Lopez^{[a]}; Vindver^{[a]}; Dopson^{[a]}	4:48
9.	"Stay Long Love You" (featuring Gunna)	Carey; Sergio Kitchens	Carey; Jonathan Yip; Ray Romulus; Jeremy Reeves; Ray Charles McCollough II	Carey; The Stereotypes	3:01
10.	"Portrait"	Carey	Carey; Daniel Moore II	Carey; Moore	4:01
Total length:					38:26

Caution – Japanese edition and 2022 digital re-release (bonus track)
No.	Title	Lyrics	Music	Producer(s)	Length
11.	"Runway"	Carey; Hamilton	Carey; Moore; Losnegård	Carey; Skrillex; Lido	3:41
Total length:					42:07

Caution – Japanese digital edition (bonus track)
No.	Title	Lyrics	Music	Producer(s)	Length
12.	"Runway" (featuring Kohh)	Carey; Hamilton; Kohh	Carey; Moore; Losnegård	Carey; Skrillex	3:41
Total length:					45:48

Notes

- ^a signifies a co-producer
- ^b signifies additional production

Sample credits

- "GTFO" contains a sample of "Goodbye to a World" by Porter Robinson.
- "A No No" contains a sample from "Rain Dance" by the Jeff Lorber Fusion, and "Crush on You" by Lil' Kim featuring The Notorious B.I.G. and Lil Cease.
- "Giving Me Life" contains dialogue from the film Trading Places, performed by Eddie Murphy and James D. Turner.
- "Runway" contains a sample from "Butterfly" and an interpolation of "We Belong Together", both by Carey.

== Personnel ==
Credits adapted from Tidal.

Performance

- Mariah Carey – vocals, strings (track 10), executive production, songwriting (all tracks), production (all tracks)
- Ty Dolla Sign – featured vocals (track 5)
- Dev Hynes – featured vocals (as Blood Orange) (track 6), production (track 6)
- Slick Rick – featured vocals (track 6)
- Gunna – featured vocals (track 9)
- KOHH – featured vocals (track 12)
- Mary Ann Tatum – background vocals (track 4)
- Priscilla Renea – background vocals (track 4)
- Timbaland – background vocals (track 8), production (track 8)
- Ray Romulus – additional vocals (track 9)

Instrumentation

- Devonté Hynes – all instruments (track 6)
- Larrance Dopson – keyboards (tracks 7 and 8), co-production (track 8)
- Angel Lopez – keyboards (track 8), co-production (track 8), programming (track 8), recording (track 8)
- Federico Vindver – keyboards (track 8), co-production (track 8), programming (track 8), recording (track 8)
- Ray McCullough II – bass (track 9)
- Ray Romulus – drums (track 9)
- Jeremy Reeves – percussion (track 9)
- Jonathan Yip – synthesizer (track 9)
- Daniel Moore II – piano (track 10)
- Josh Baker – percussion (track 10)
- Serena McKinney Göransson – strings (track 10), violin (track 10)

Production

- Nineteen85 – production (track 1)
- DJ Mustard – production (track 2)
- Luca – production (track 3)
- No I.D. – production (track 3)
- SLMN – production (track 3)
- Shea Taylor – production (track 4)
- Lido – production (tracks 5, 11, and 12), programming (track 5)
- Poo Bear – production (track 5), additional production (tracks 7 and 8)
- Skrillex – production (tracks 5, 11, and 12), mixing (track 5)
- Fred Ball – production (track 7)
- WondaGurl – production (track 7)
- The Stereotypes – production (track 9), programming (track 9)
- Daniel Moore II – production (track 10)
- Jermaine Dupri – additional production (tracks 4 and 7)
- Jordan Manswell – co-production (track 1)

Technical

- Brian Garten – mixing (tracks 1–3, and 10), recording (tracks 1–11 (bonus))
- Phil Tan – mixing (tracks 1–4)
- Chris Gehringer – mixing (track 2), mastering (tracks 2–7, 9, and 10)
- Jaycen Joshua – mixing (tracks 5, 7, and 9)
- Tom Norris – mixing (track 5)
- Mikaelin Bluespruce – mixing (track 6)
- Chris Galland – mixing (track 8)
- Manny Marroquin – mixing (track 8)
- James Royo – recording (track 5)
- Bill Zimmerman – engineering assistance (tracks 1–4)
- Jeremy Nichols – engineering assistance (tracks 1, 2, 4–11 (bonus))
- Will Quinnell – engineering assistance (tracks 2–7, 9, and 10)
- Brendan Morwaski – engineering assistance (track 3)
- Richard Evatt – engineering assistance (track 3)
- Jacob Richards – engineering assistance (tracks 5, 7, and 9)
- Mike Seaberg – engineering assistance (tracks 5, 7, and 9)
- Rashawn McLean – engineering assistance (tracks 5, 7, and 9)
- Zach Brown – engineering assistance (track 6)
- Jason Patterson – engineering assistance (track 8)
- Matt Anthony – engineering assistance (track 8)
- Robin Florent – engineering assistance (track 8)
- Scott Desmarais – engineering assistance (track 8)
- Jered Schuerman – engineering assistance (track 10)
- Kevin "KD" Davis – mixing (track 11 (bonus))
- Colin Leonard – mastering (track 1)

Artwork

- Anita Marisa Boriboon – art direction and design
- An Le – photography

== Charts ==
=== Weekly charts ===
Chart (2018)	Peak position
Australian Albums (ARIA)	15
Australian Urban Albums (ARIA)	2
Austrian Albums (Ö3 Austria)	54
Belgian Albums (Ultratop Flanders)	38
Belgian Albums (Ultratop Wallonia)	37
Canadian Albums (Billboard)	15
Croatian International Albums (HDU)	16
Czech Albums (ČNS IFPI)	55
Dutch Albums (Album Top 100)	38
French Albums (SNEP)	71
German Albums (Offizielle Top 100)	67
Greek Albums (IFPI)	25
Irish Albums (IRMA)	63
Italian Albums (FIMI)	35
Japanese Albums (Oricon)	30
Japan Hot Albums (Billboard Japan)	24
Lithuanian Albums (AGATA)	77
New Zealand Albums (RMNZ)	40
Portuguese Albums (AFP)	22
Scottish Albums (Official Charts)	55
Slovak Albums (ČNS IFPI)	55
Spanish Albums (Promusicae)	19
Swiss Albums (Schweizer Hitparade)	35
Taiwanese Albums (Five Music)	1
UK Albums (Official Charts)	40
UK R&B Albums (Official Charts)	1
US Billboard 200	5
US Top R&B/Hip-Hop Albums (Billboard)	1

=== Year-end charts ===
Chart (2019)	Position
US Top Current Album Sales (Billboard)	68

== See also ==
- List of Billboard number-one R&B/hip-hop albums of 2018
- List of UK R&B Albums Chart number ones of 2018
