= Adam Rothenberg =

American actor (born 1975)

- Born: June 20, 1975 (age 51); Tenafly, New Jersey, U.S.
- Occupations: Actor, producer
- Years active: 1999–present
- Spouse: Charlene McKenna (m. 2021)
- Children: 1

Adam Rothenberg (born June 20, 1975) is an American actor, best known for his role as Capt. Homer Jackson in the BBC One drama mystery series Ripper Street (2012–16). In film, he has starred in Mad Money (2008) as Bob Truman, Tennessee (2008) as Carter, and The Immigrant (2013) as Officer DeKeiffer.

== Early life ==
Rothenberg was born to Gillian and Kenneth Rothenberg in Tenafly, New Jersey on June 20, 1975, and graduated from Tenafly High School in 1998. He is of Jewish ancestry on his father's side and has two brothers and three sisters. In 2008, he revealed to People that, before turning to acting, he was a garbage man, a fact-checker for Mademoiselle, and a security guard. Rothenberg trained as an actor at The Acting Studio - New York under James Price in New York City; while there, he performed numerous roles with Chelsea Repertory Company & LAB. From 1996 to 1997, he served in the United States Army, based in Germany.

== Career ==
Rothenberg has performed on television, in film and in theatre. In New York, Rothenberg has starred in many Off-Broadway productions. These include the lead in Second Stage Theatre's revival of Danny and the Deep Blue Sea (2004), as well as his critically acclaimed role in The Women's Project's Birdy (2003). In 2006, Rothenberg played the Scottish storyteller Chimney Bosch in the MCC Theater's The Wooden Breeks, directed by Trip Cullman. Outside of New York, Rothenberg starred opposite Patricia Clarkson as Stanley Kowalski in A Streetcar Named Desire at the Kennedy Center's Tennessee Williams Festival (2004).

At the Williamstown Theatre Festival, he starred as Doug in Alexandra Gersten-Vassilaros's Mother of Invention (2003), directed by Nicholas Martin, and as Lord Darlington in Lady Windermere's Fan (2005), directed by Moisés Kaufman. In 2011, he starred as Nils Krogstad in A Doll's House. Rothenberg then starred in the Mark Taper Forum's 2011 production of Burn This. Other theatre performances include Finder's Fee at the Edinburgh Fringe Festival, A Steady Rain, The Center of Gravity, Mad Forest, I'm Really Here and Almost Like Being.

In his television work, Rothenberg filmed one of the lead roles, Evan Wexler, in Fox's unaired television pilot Damages, and was also one of the leads, Eddie Caprio, in the comedy series Misconceptions, which also did not air. In 2008, he appeared as David "Augie" Augustine in the comedy-drama series The Ex List. Since 2012, he has had a starring role in the BBC One drama mystery television series Ripper Street, portraying Capt. Homer Jackson. In 2015, he was cast in the pilot of ABC's crime drama series Wicked City as Detective Jack Roth, an officer searching for a serial killer on the Sunset Strip. His role was recast in July 2015 after the show received its ABC airdate, and the role was instead given to Jeremy Sisto.

== Personal life ==
Rothenberg married actress Charlene McKenna in January 2021 at Castle Leslie, Glaslough.

== Filmography ==
=== Film ===
Year	Title	Role	Notes
1999	Modern Young Man	Unknown	Short film
2001	Cruise Control	Flapjax Patron	Short film
2003	Coyote Beach	The Man	Short film; also producer
2008	Mad Money	Bob Truman	
2008	Tennessee	Carter	
2009	Under New Management	Mark Boyd	
2011	The Dish & the Spoon	Rose's Husband	
2013	The Immigrant	Officer DeKeiffer	
2017	Dark Ascension	Keith	
2021	The Mauritanian	Santiago	

=== Television ===
Year	Title	Role	Notes
2003	Hack	Greg	Episode: "To Have and Have Not"
2004	The Jury	Chris Benini	Episode: "Three Boys and a Gun"
2006	Misconceptions	Eddie Caprio	Unaired; 7 episodes
2006	Conviction	Jay Patterson	2 episodes
2006	Damages	Evan Wexler	Unaired pilot episode
2008	Law & Order	Marty Vance	Episode: "Submission"
2008	The Ex-List	David Augustine	13 episodes
2010	House	Taylor	Episode: "Private Lives"
2010	Law & Order: Criminal Intent	Henry Di Piano	Episode: "The Mobster Will See You Now"
2011	Person of Interest	Andrew Benton	Episode: "Cura Te Ipsum"
2012	Alcatraz	Johnny McKee	Episode: "Johnny McKee"
2012	Elementary	Liam Danow	Episode: "You Do It to Yourself"
2012–16	Ripper Street	Capt. Homer Jackson/Matthew Judge	36 episodes
2014	The Divide	Danny	7 episodes
2018	Dietland	Dominic O'Shea	10 episodes
2018	Castle Rock	Reverend Matthew Deaver	5 episodes
2020	The Serpent	Gilbert Redland	3 episodes
2022	Ozark	Mel Sattem	Series regular, Season 4

=== Theatre ===
Year	Title	Role	Venue	Ref
2003	Mother of Invention	Doug	Williamstown Theatre Festival, Williamstown, United States	
2003	Birdy	Sergeant Al Columbato	WP Theater, New York City, United States	
2004	A Streetcar Named Desire	Stanley Kowalski	John F. Kennedy Center for the Performing Arts, Washington, D.C., United States	
2004	Danny and the Deep Blue Sea	Danny	Second Stage Theater, New York City, United States	
2005	Lady Windermere's Fan	Lord Darlington	Williamstown Theatre Festival, Williamstown, United States	
2009	The Retributionists	Jascha	Playwrights Horizons, New York City, United States	
2010	There Are No More Big Secrets	Gabe	Rattlestick Playwrights Theater, New York City, United States	
2011	Burn This	Pale	Mark Taper Forum, Los Angeles, United States	
2011	A Doll's House	Nils Krogstad	Williamstown Theatre Festival, Williamstown, United States	
2016	Fool for Love	Eddie	Found 111, London, United Kingdom	
