= With You (Mariah Carey song) =

2018 single by Mariah Carey

Single by Mariah Carey

from the album Caution
- Released: October 4, 2018
- Studio: Cha Cha Studios (Beverly Hills, CA); Westlake Recording Studios (Hollywood, CA)
- Genre: R&B; soul
- Length: 3:47
- Label: Epic
- Songwriters: Mariah Carey; Charles Hinshaw; Dijon McFarlane; Greg Lawary
- Producers: Carey; DJ Mustard

Mariah Carey singles chronology
"I Don't" (2017)	"With You" (2018)	"A No No" (2019)

Music video
- "With You" on YouTube

"With You" is a song by American singer-songwriter Mariah Carey from her fifteenth studio album, Caution (2018). On October 4, 2018, Epic Records released it as the album's lead single. The song was written by Carey, Charles Hinshaw, Dijon McFarlane and Greg Lawary, with Carey and DJ Mustard also producing it. The song was announced on October 2, along with its single artwork. A "velvety" ballad with a finger-snap beat and warm piano, its lyrics center around a woman seeking safety and security and her partner promising his love.

"With You" found success in Hungary, charting at number 8 there. It also peaked at number seven on the US Adult Contemporary chart, becoming her highest-charting song on the latter in several years. Elsewhere, the song reached at number 30 on the Physical/Digital component chart in Spain and number 38 on Belgium's Urban chart.

An accompanying music video, directed by Sarah McColgan, was released on October 10, 2018. Its black and white visuals feature Carey posing in different locations around Los Angeles. Carey performed the song at the 2018 American Music Awards and on Good Morning America.

== Background and composition ==
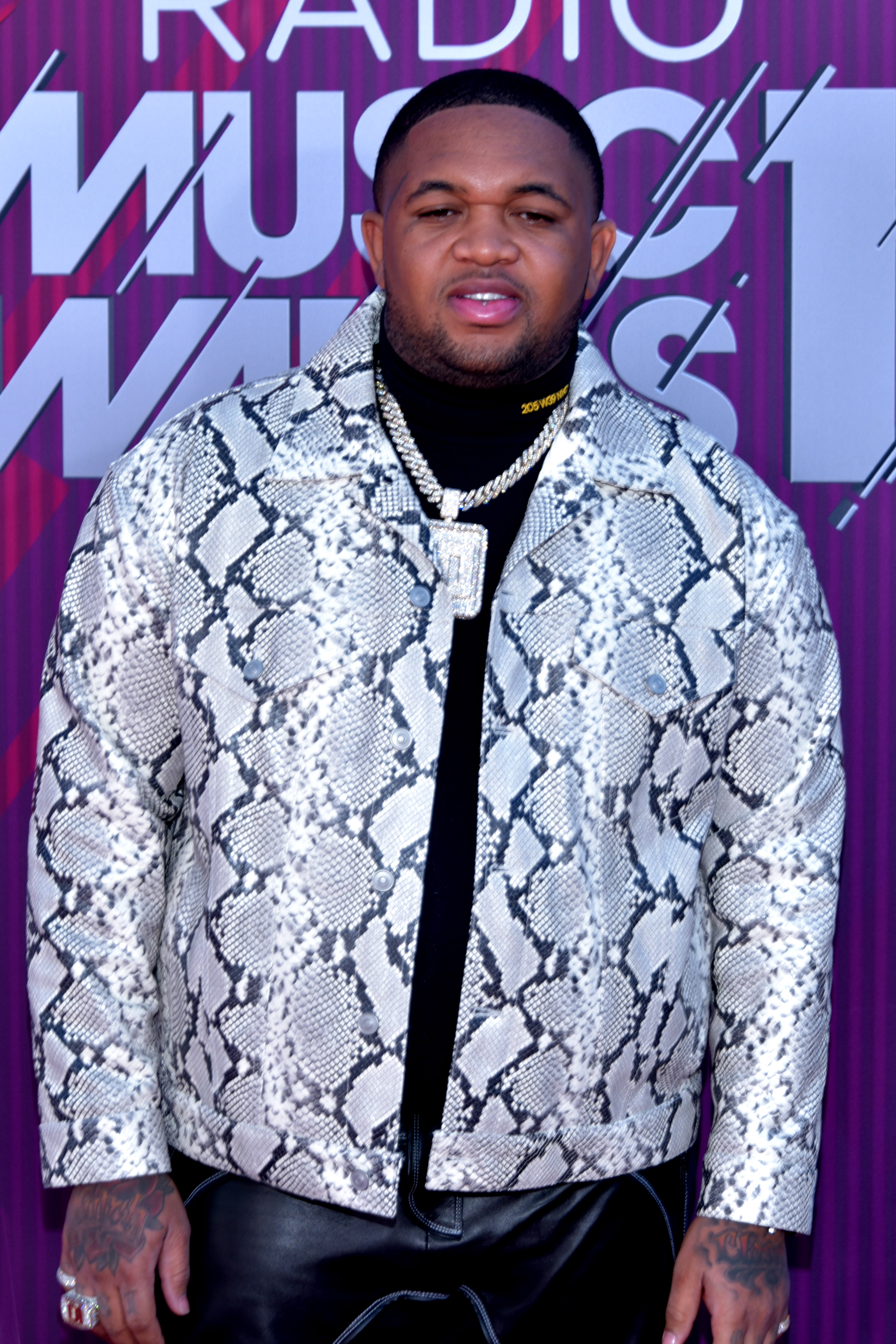
DJ Mustard contributed to both the production and writing of "With You".

DJ Mustard and Mariah Carey produced "With You" and co-wrote it with Charles Hinshaw and Greg Lawary over a two day period at Westlake Recording Studios, Los Angeles. In reference to working with the singer, Lawary stated "When I saw my name among Mariah Carey and DJ Mustard, I teared up. She's such a legend. It's like working with Michael Jackson and Whitney Houston. She's done so much for music". The song was announced on October 2, 2018, along with its single artwork. It was released two days later. "With You" served as the second single from Carey's fifteenth studio album Caution, and was preceded by the promotional single "GTFO".

The song is a "velvety" ballad with a finger-snap beat and warm piano. It features lyrics about a woman seeking safety and security and her partner promising his love. The song's outro features one of Carey's signature high-tone whistle notes. "With You" is centered around Carey telling someone she "fucks with" them in a romantic capacity. It includes a reference to her 1998 single "Breakdown" featuring Bone Thugs-n-Harmony, with her singing "Ever since that Bone Thugs song, you ain't gotta break down, you're too strong". Some critics viewed the song as reminiscent of Carey's earlier work, including the songs: "I Stay in Love", "Bye Bye", and "Angels Cry".

== Critical reception ==
"With You" received positive reviews from critics. The Atlantic's Spencer Kornhaber praised "With You", stating that he "can’t stop playing" it, and opined that Carey "regards romance with open-eyed caginess". Writing for Rolling Stone, Brittany Spanos called the song a "shchmaltzy slow jam", and made note of the singer's use of the whistle register. Chris DeVille of Stereogum described it as "a different sort of ballad: warm, organic, built from little more than gospel piano and booming 808s", adding "When she leans into the hook, [...], you feel that too". Critics for Jezebel wrote "she will have you know that she is Mariah the star", but added that it is "not super exciting stuff". The song, and its follow-up single " A No No", failed to chart on the US Hot 100 or any major music chart internationally. Its parent album Caution would become Carey's lowest selling studio album, selling approximately 80,000 copies globally in its first week. Epic Records would depart ways with Carey after the release of this album.

=== Lists ===
Critical rankings for "With You"
Year	Publication	Accolade	Rank	Ref.
2023	Teen Vogue	51 Best Love Songs of All Time	47	

== Commercial performance ==
"With You" failed to chart on the US Billboard Hot 100, but was successful on the Adult Contemporary chart, where it reached a peak of number seven. It peaked at number three on the Adult R&B Songs chart. It obtained number 33 on the Adult Top 40 chart, and number 21 on the R&B/Hip-Hop Airplay chart. Outside the US, the song reached number 125 on the France Downloads chart and number 30 on Spain's Physical/Digital chart, respectively. It reached number eight on Hungary's Single Top 40 chart.

== Music video ==
The accompanying music video for "With You" was directed by Sarah McColgan. Its release was announced by Carey a day prior to the premiere via her YouTube channel on October 10, 2018. The video is set in black and white and features Carey posing in different spots across Los Angeles. The outfit worn by Carey consists of a fur coat and sunglasses.

== Live performances ==
Carey performed "With You" for the first time at the American Music Awards of 2018. During the performance, she wore a hot pink gown, and was surrounded by shirtless male dancers who performed intricate choreography. While performing, Carey was raised on a pink platform which appeared to be part of her gown. The singer stood in one place throughout the entire performance while dancers mimicking a flower executed choreography around her, and she concluded it by blowing a kiss to the audience. Carey later performed the song on selected dates of her Live in Concert tour. On November 19, 2018, Carey performed "With You" on Good Morning America. It was included in the setlist for her Caution World Tour (2019), serving as part of the encore.

== Credits and personnel ==
Credits are referenced from the album's liner notes.

- Mariah Carey – songwriting, lead vocals, production
- DJ Mustard – songwriting, production
- Greg Lawary – songwriting
- Charles Hinshaw – songwriting
- Chris Gehringer – mastering
- Brian Garten – mixing, recording
- Phil Tan – mixing
- Bill Zimmerman – engineering
- Will Quinnell – engineering
- Jeremy Nichols – engineering

== Track listings and formats ==
Digital download

1. "With You" – 3:47

Promotional CD single

1. "With You" (Radio Edit) – 3:47
2. "With You" (Clean) – 3:47
3. "With You" (Main) – 3:47
4. "With You" (Instrumental) – 3:47

== Charts ==
=== Weekly charts ===
Chart (2018–2019)	Peak position
Belgium Urban (Ultratop Flanders)	38
France Downloads (SNEP)	125
Hungary (Single Top 40)	8
Spain Physical/Digital (PROMUSICAE)	30
US Adult Contemporary (Billboard)	7
US Adult Pop Airplay (Billboard)	33
US R&B/Hip-Hop Airplay (Billboard)	21
US R&B/Hip-Hop Digital Songs (Billboard)	22

=== Year-end charts ===
Chart (2019)	Position
US Adult Contemporary (Billboard)	31
US Adult R&B Songs (Billboard)	25

== Release history ==
Region	Date	Format	Label	Ref.
Various	October 4, 2018	Digital download	Epic	
United States	October 15, 2018	Hot adult contemporary	Epic	
United States	October 16, 2018	Contemporary hit radio	Epic	
