= The Distance (Mariah Carey song) =

2018 song by Mariah Carey

Promotional single by Mariah Carey featuring Ty Dolla $ign

from the album Caution
- Released: October 18, 2018
- Studio: Cha Cha Studios (Beverly Hills, CA); Westlake Recording Studios (Hollywood, CA); Chalice Recording Studios (Los Angeles, CA)
- Genre: R&B
- Length: 3:47
- Label: Epic
- Songwriter(s): Mariah Carey; Tyrone Griffin Jr.; Sonny Moore; Peder Losnegård; Jason Boyd
- Producer(s): Carey; Skrillex; Lido; Poo Bear

"The Distance" is a song by American singer-songwriter Mariah Carey featuring fellow American singer-songwriter Ty Dolla $ign. It was released by Epic Records on October 18, 2018, as the second promotional single from Carey's fifteenth studio album Caution. It was included with the pre-order of the record. A lyric video was released on November 16, 2018, along with its parent album's release. "The Distance" was written by the artists alongside Skrillex, Poo Bear, and Lido, with the latter three producing the song with Carey.

The song is described as being "sleek, slow funk", with Carey speaking out against the detractors who doubted her relationship with her lover would "go the distance", setting the song during the "warm days" and "cold nights" of "late October". The song received positive reviews from critics and charted at number 13 on the US R&B Digital Songs chart.

== Critical reception ==
Slant Magazine called the song "the album’s most radio-friendly offering so far". Rolling Stone mentioned that the song "boasts a triumphant R&B vibe". In 2020, Billboard ranked it as the 92nd greatest song of Carey's career.

== Background and release ==
The song was announced along with the pre-order of Caution. Carey and Ty Dolla Sign performed the song on The Tonight Show Starring Jimmy Fallon on November 16, 2018. She also performed the song on the seventh leg (or second European leg) of Carey's All I Want for Christmas Is You concert residency in December 2018.

== Charts ==
=== Weekly charts ===
Chart (2018)	Peak position
US R&B Digital Songs (Billboard)	13

== Release history ==
Region	Date	Format	Label	Ref
Worldwide	October 18, 2018	Digital download; streaming	Epic	
