= Caution World Tour =

2019 concert tour by Mariah Carey

- Tour by Mariah Carey
- Location: North America; Europe; Asia; South America
- Associated album: Caution
- Start date: February 27, 2019
- End date: October 20, 2019
- Legs: 5
- No. of shows: 23 in North America; 10 in Europe; 1 in South America; 1 in Asia; 35 total
- Box office: $7,421,819 (18 reported shows)

Mariah Carey concert chronology
- Mariah Carey: Live in Concert (2018); Caution World Tour (2019); Merry Christmas to All! Tour (2022)

Caution World Tour was the eleventh concert tour by American singer-songwriter Mariah Carey, in support of her fifteenth studio album, Caution. The tour consisted of 35 dates, including shows in North America, Europe and the Caribbean, at a mix of small and mid-size venues and arenas.

The tour received widespread acclaim, with critics praising Mariah Carey’s powerful vocals, commanding stage presence, and a setlist that blended new material with career-spanning hits. Several noted the inclusion of songs from Glitter in a dedicated act of the show, following the "#JusticeForGlitter" campaign on social media that started in 2018, as well the presence of club and hip-hop remixes, fan favorites, and classics on the setlist, which many felt showcased her enduring artistry and legacy.

== Background and development ==
Carey's fifteenth studio album, titled Caution, was released on November 16, 2018 and received universal acclaim from critics. The album was described as a "fine-tuning" of Carey's previous work, and was praised for its freshness which made it "pleasingly defiant", with some critics hailing it as being "the new blueprint for legacy acts" of Carey's stature. By December 2018, the album had been featured on several year-end lists. Prior to the album's release, dates were announced for both the North American and European leg of the tour, teasing it as being her "most intimate tour yet".

The opening leg of the tour was performed in small, theatre-based and mid-sized venues across North America. It kicked off on February 27, 2019 in Irving, Texas and concluded on April 6 in Bethlehem, Pennsylvania. The European leg of the tour was mainly arena-based, with Carey opening on May 22 in Dublin and finishing on June 13 in Amsterdam.

Following this, Carey performed at several festivals including the Festival d'été de Québec at the Plains of Abraham, Canada, and the Curaçao North Sea Jazz Festival.

== Set list ==
This set list is representative of the February 27, 2019, show in Irving, Texas. It may not represent all dates of the tour.

"M" (intro)

Act I

1. "A No No"
2. "Dreamlover"
3. "You Don't Know What to Do / Emotions"
4. "Anytime You Need a Friend" (contains elements of the "C&C Club Version")

Act II

5. "Can't Take That Away (Mariah's Theme)" (Morales Revival Triumphant Mix) / "Fantasy" (Def Club Mix / Bad Boy Fantasy)
6. "Always Be My Baby" (contains elements of the "Mr. Dupri Mix")
7. "Caution"
8. "GTFO"
9. "8th Grade"
10. "Stay Long Love You"

Act III

Guitar interlude

11. "My All"
12. "Portrait"
13. "Vision of Love"

"#JusticeForGlitter" (video interlude)

14. Medley:
  1. "Never Too Far"
  2. "Last Night a DJ Saved My Life"
  3. "Loverboy"
  4. "Didn't Mean to Turn You On" (followed by band introductions)

Act IV

"Mariah & Bianca" (video interlude)

15. "Heartbreaker" (contains elements of the remix)
16. "Touch My Body"
17. "We Belong Together" (followed by remix outro)

Encore

18. "With You"
19. "Hero" (with extended outro)

=== Notes ===
- In Atlanta, Da Brat joined Carey onstage during the performance of "Heartbreaker".
- During the show in Wallingford, “Underneath the Stars” was performed.

== Critical reception ==
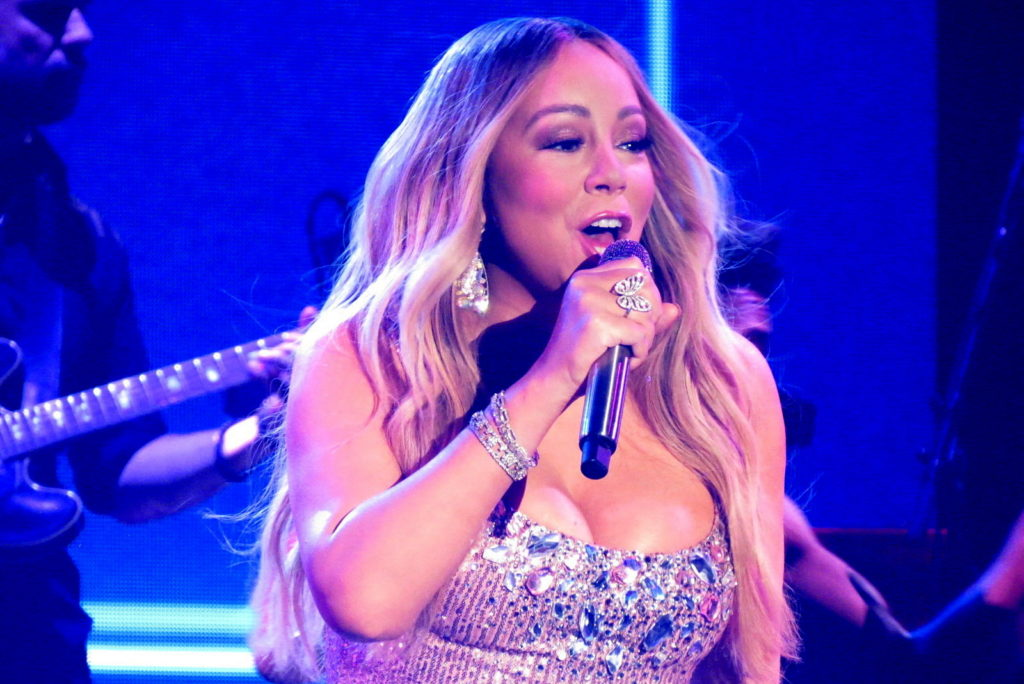
Carey, during the Caution World Tour show at the Ziggo Dome, Amsterdam, Netherlands, June 2019

The tour garnered acclaim from critics, many of whom commended the quality of Carey's voice and the singer's stage presence. In a review for the Atlanta-Journal Constitution, Melissa Ruggieri concluded that Carey had ”resumed her live prowess”, describing it as being ”a commendable feat nearly 30 years into a career and one worth cheering”. Similarly, Stefan Kyriazis from Express gave the show 5 stars, stating: "She was hitting the high trills, the low growls, and all those iconic whistle notes were popping off all over the stage..."

Carey had a three-day residency at the Royal Albert Hall in London. She was praised both for her vocal ability and overall stage presence. Michael Cragg from The Guardian described Carey's "incredible, playful performances" as a testament to her status as a "gold-plated pop diva". Similarly, Kate Solomon from The Daily Telegraph stated the shows were "a surreal but wildly enjoyable showcase of a brighter, more fun side of the pop icon". In a review for The Arts Desk, Sebastian Scotney stated Carey "delivers and the audience delivers back". During her concert in Dublin, Louise Bruton from The Irish Times stated: "She takes us through three decades of hits, from soul-searching ballads to chart-topping songs that bring in pop hooks, hip-hop beats, R&B melodies that show off every side of the singer that we’ve come to know over the years". Rosa Diaz from 20 minutos also gave a positive review of her concert in Barcelona, citing Carey's "powerful presence, who reviewed her greatest hits alternated with some songs from her new album, showing her vocal ability and knowing how to be on stage".

== Tour dates ==
List of concerts, showing date, city, country, venue, opening acts, tickets sold, number of available tickets, and gross revenue
Date	City	Country	Venue	Opening acts	Attendance	Revenue
North America
February 27, 2019	Irving	United States	Toyota Music Factory	DJ Suss One	—	—
March 1, 2019	Sugar Land	United States	Smart Financial Centre	DJ Suss One	5,581 / 6,554	$631,986
March 2, 2019	Biloxi	United States	Beau Rivage Theatre	DJ Suss One	—	—
March 5, 2019	Atlanta	United States	Fox Theatre	DJ Suss One	3,348 / 4,101	$424,908
March 6, 2019	Louisville	United States	The Louisville Palace	DJ Suss One	2,452 / 2,597	$343,823
March 8, 2019	Detroit	United States	Fox Theatre	DJ Suss One	4,531 / 4,751	$440,768
March 9, 2019	Indianapolis	United States	Murat Theatre	DJ Suss One	2,425 / 2,515	$301,184
March 11, 2019	Chicago	United States	Chicago Theatre	DJ Suss One	3,551 / 3,551	$434,548
March 13, 2019	Minneapolis	United States	State Theatre	DJ Suss One	2,106 / 2,133	$295,814
March 15, 2019	Milwaukee	United States	Miller High Life Theatre	DJ Suss One	3,503 / 3,503	$331,319
March 16, 2019	St. Louis	United States	Stifel Theatre	DJ Suss One	2,940 / 3,038	$302,781
March 18, 2019	Pittsburgh	United States	Benedum Center	DJ Suss One	2,508 / 2,825	$339,167
March 20, 2019	Toronto	Canada	Sony Centre for the Performing Arts	DJ Suss One	3,140 / 3,191	$412,001
March 21, 2019	Orillia	Canada	Casino Rama Entertainment Centre	DJ Suss One	—	—
March 23, 2019	Buffalo	United States	Shea's Performing Arts Center	DJ Suss One	2,811 / 3,049	$352,281
March 25, 2019	New York City	United States	Radio City Music Hall	DJ Suss One	5,943 / 5,943	$941,320
March 30, 2019	Atlantic City	United States	Hard Rock Live	DJ Suss One	—	—
March 31, 2019	Oxon Hill	United States	MGM National Harbor Theater	DJ Suss One	2,763 / 2,763	$494,534
April 2, 2019	Boston	United States	Wang Theatre	DJ Suss One	3,092 / 3,223	$357,446
April 3, 2019	Philadelphia	United States	The Met Philadelphia	DJ Suss One	3,155 / 3,155	$290,194
April 5, 2019	Wallingford	United States	Toyota Oakdale Theatre	DJ Suss One	4,150 / 4,384	$316,063
April 6, 2019	Bethlehem	United States	Sands Bethlehem Event Center	DJ Suss One	—	—
Europe
May 22, 2019	Dublin	Ireland	3Arena	—N/a	5,023 / 5,023	$411,682
May 25, 2019	London	England	Royal Albert Hall	—N/a	—	—
May 26, 2019	London	England	Royal Albert Hall	—N/a	—	—
May 27, 2019	London	England	Royal Albert Hall	—N/a	—	—
June 1, 2019	Paris	France	Grand Amphitheatre	—N/a	—N/a	—N/a
June 2, 2019	Hamburg	Germany	Barclaycard Arena	—N/a	—	—N/a
June 4, 2019	Aalborg	Denmark	Aalborghallen	—N/a	—	—N/a
June 10, 2019 (Note: The June 10, 2019 concert in Barcelona, Spain at Palau Reial de Padralbes was a part of the Festival Jardins Pedralbes.)	Barcelona	Spain	Palau Reial de Pedralbes	—N/a	—	—N/a
June 11, 2019	Bordeaux	France	Arkéa Arena	—N/a	—	—N/a
June 13, 2019	Amsterdam	Netherlands	Ziggo Dome	—N/a	—	—
North America
July 11, 2019 (Note: The July 11, 2019 concert in Quebec City, Canada at Plains of Abraham was a part of the Festival d'été de Québec.)	Quebec City	Canada	Plains of Abraham	Daniel Caesar		
South America
August 31, 2019 (Note: The August 31, 2019 concert in Willemstad, Curaçao at World Trade Center Piscadera Bay was a part of the Curaçao North Sea Jazz Festival.)	Willemstad	Curaçao	World Trade Center Piscadera Bay	—N/a	—	—
Asia
October 20, 2019 (Note: The October 20, 2019 concert in Dubai, United Arab Emirates at Burj Park was a part of the 365-day countdown to Expo 2020.)	Dubai	United Arab Emirates	Burj Park	—N/a	—	—
Total					62,842 / 66,299 (95%)	$7,421,819

=== Cancelled shows ===
List of cancelled concerts, showing date, city, country, venue and reason for cancellation
Date	City	Country	Venue	Reason
June 8, 2019 (Note: The July 8, 2019 concert in Florence, Italy at Stadio Artemio Franchi was a part of the cancelled Florence4Ever.)	Florence	Italy	Stadio Artemio Franchi	Festival cancellation
