= A No No =

- Stefflon Don remix single cover

Single by Mariah Carey

from the album Caution
- Released: March 4, 2019
- Recorded: 2018
- Studio: Cha Cha (Beverly Hills, California); Westlake (Los Angeles, California); Callanwolde (Atlanta, Georgia)
- Genre: Hip hop; R&B
- Length: 3:07
- Label: Epic
- Songwriters: Mariah Carey; Robert "Shea" Taylor; Priscilla Hamilton; Jeff Lorber; Kimberly Jones; Christopher Wallace; Mason Betha; Nigel Bond; Cameron Giles; Andreao Heard
- Producers: Mariah Carey; Shea Taylor

Mariah Carey singles chronology
"With You" (2018)	"A No No" (2019)	"In the Mix" (2019)

Music video
- "A No No" on YouTube

"A No No" is a song by American singer-songwriter Mariah Carey from her fifteenth studio album, Caution (2018). The song was written by Carey, Robert "Shea" Taylor, Priscilla Hamilton, Mason Betha and Camron Giles, and produced by Carey and Taylor. Since the track samples Lil' Kim's "Crush on You" (1997), songwriting credits were added for a total of nine. Digitally released as a promotional single in November 2018, Epic Records serviced it to rhythmic contemporary and urban contemporary radio as the second single from the album on March 4, 2019 and was her last release under the label.

"A No No" is a hip hop and R&B song with a blithely dismissive chorus and frisky beat. The song features lyrics that taunt a former acquaintance who could not handle the singer's expectations. It was positively received by music critics. The music video was released on March 8, 2019. It starts with the singer riding a neon pink and blue train. As the video progresses, Carey is joined by other passengers in an impromptu party where she sings and they dance. "A No No" was supported by remixes featuring Stefflon Don and Shawni, each accompanied by a music video. The original version of the song charted at number 17 on the US R&B Digital Songs chart. It was included as the opening track in the setlist for the Caution World Tour (2019).

== Background and composition ==
"A No No" was initially written by Mariah Carey, Robert "Shea" Taylor, Priscilla Hamilton, Mason Betha and Camron Giles, with production from Carey, Taylor and additional production from Jermaine Dupri. Since the song samples American rapper Lil' Kim's 1997 single "Crush on You", she received writing credits with Christopher Wallace and Andreao Heard. "Crush on You" had sampled "Rain Dance" by the Jeff Lorber Fusion (written by Jeff Lorber) from his 1979 album, Water Sign, so Lorber was added as a songwriter.

"A No No" is a hip hop and R&B song with a blithely dismissive chorus and frisky beat, making use of a sped-up version of the instrumental and the Notorious B.I.G.'s refrain "He's a slut, he's a ho, he's a freak/ Got a different girl every day of the week." It features lyrics that taunt a former acquaintance who could not handle the singer's expectations. It has been described as a "propulsive banger". It sees Carey rejecting a lover despite what they had in the past. The song has a "catchy" chorus, and features the singer rejecting a past lover who has "wronged [her] for the last time". The lyrics include a shout out to Carey's lawyer Ed Shapiro, and a comparison between her and the character Gilligan from the 1960s American sitcom Gilligan's Island. She concludes the song by saying "no" in a variety of languages, including Spanish, French, Portuguese and Japanese.

== Release and remixes ==
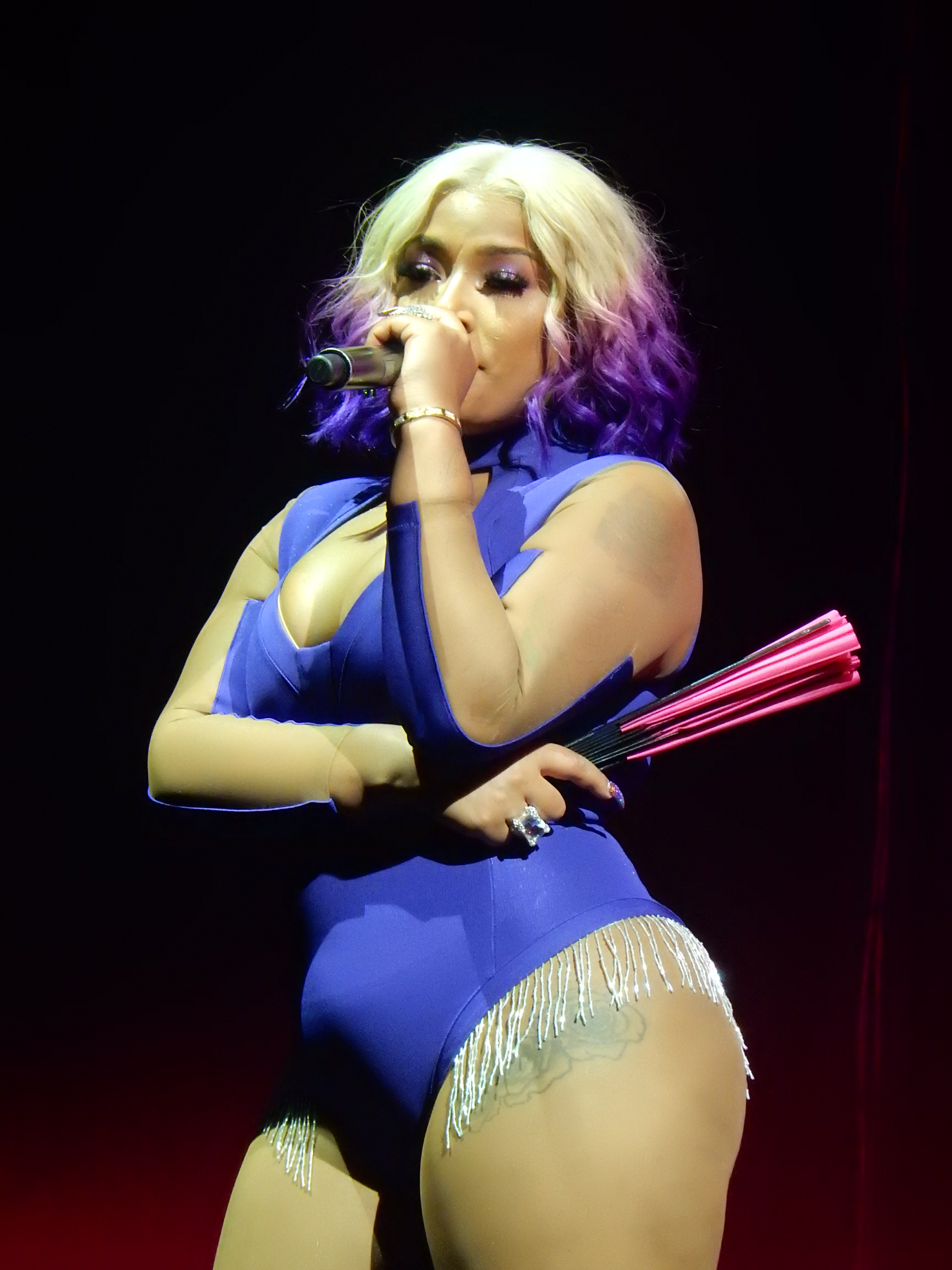
Stefflon Don (pictured) was featured on one of the remixes for the song.

Following its digital release as a promotional single on November 1, 2018, it was serviced to mainstream R&B/Hip-hop and rhythmic contemporary radio on March 4, 2019, as the second single from Caution. During her appearance on Watch What Happens Live with Andy Cohen in November 2018, Carey revealed that she hoped to remix "A No No" with Lil' Kim and Cardi B. Later that month, the song's producer Jermaine Dupri began teasing the remix and Missy Elliott's involvement on social media. However, on March 15, 2019, a remix featuring Stefflon Don was released instead. The remix was positively received by music critics. Billboard's Michael Saponara wrote "Steff fires off several warning shots at those speaking on her name throughout the explosive verse". Writing for Vibe, a critic stated that Don "was the perfect addition to the track", and added that she "provides her infectious rhymes and flow" to it. Chantilly Post of HotNewHipHop wrote "Stefflon makes her presence known at the top of the beat and then comes in for the second verse spitting her British/patois bars".

On April 5, 2019, a second remix featuring Shawni was released. The rapper added two verses to the song, with an interpolation of Lauryn Hill's song "Ex-Factor" (1998) and lyrics including "So all my exes need to tell you that I'm sorry, That I didn't leave you sooner. I'm sorry I gave you more time than I shoulda."

== Reception ==
"A No No" was positively received by some music critics. The Fader writer Myles Tanzer called Carey's vocals on the song "undeniable", and the lyrics "quick as hell", but felt that the album version of the song left room for a rap feature. Idolator's Mike Wass opined that "A No No" was the most instant track from its parent album, and speculated that it was an ode to her ex-manager Stella Bulochnikov. Brittany Spanos of Rolling Stone wrote that with the song, Carey shows "that she can translate her quick wit into pop gold", and "spells out extremely over this person she is, delivering insults in acrobatically sung runs". It was included at number 78 on The Fader's list of the 100 best songs of 2018, and at number 15 on Idolator's list of the 100 best singles of 2018. In 2020, The Guardian ranked the song as the ninth greatest Mariah Carey single, and Billboard ranked it as the 21st greatest song of her career, that same year. "A No No" charted at number 17 on the US R&B Digital Songs chart.

== Music videos ==
A lyric video was released on December 4, 2018. It displays the lyrics in white, black and pink fonts, and features animated pictures of snakes, scissors, islands and jewelry. Carey teased the music video two days prior to its premiere through her YouTube channel on March 8, 2019. The music video features cameos from Carey's children and then boyfriend Bryan Tanaka. It starts with the singer riding a neon pink and blue train. As the video progresses, Carey is joined by other passengers in an impromptu party where she sings and they dance. The music video features additional vocalizations which do not appear on the album version, sung by Carey in a whistle register. According to a critic, they "slap an exclamation point on her sentiment".

A revamped version of the original music video was released to support the Stefflon Don remix on March 22, 2019, with added scenes of Don rapping her verse on a subway platform. On April 4, 2019, another version of the video was released to support the Shawni remix. In it, the "chicly dressed" duo transform a pedestrian subway commute into a "banging party".

== Live performances ==
"A No No" was included as the opening track in the setlist for the Caution World Tour (2019). Carey also performed the song as part of a medley, including "Always Be My Baby" (1995), "Emotions" (1991), "We Belong Together" (2005) and "Hero" (1993), at the 2019 Billboard Music Awards where she received the Icon Award. Rolling Stone's Althea Legaspi and Daniel Kreps wrote that she "seemed to battle monitor and pitch issues at times", but "still showcased her astounding range during the elegant set, which featured backing from tux-clad dancers, gospel singers and an orchestra". "A No No" was later performed as part of its "Car Ride" medley during the final leg of her concert residency The Butterfly Returns in 2020; it was also performed during her Merry Christmas One and All! holiday tour in 2023.

== Credits and personnel ==
Credits are adapted from the liner notes of Caution.

- Mariah Carey – songwriting, lead vocals, production
- Robert "Shea" Taylor – songwriting, production
- Priscilla Hamilton – songwriting, background vocals
- Jeff Lorber – songwriting
- Kimberly Jones – songwriting
- Christopher Wallace – songwriting
- Mason Betha – songwriting
- Camron Giles – songwriting
- Andreao Heard – songwriting
- Jermaine Dupri – additional production
- Mary Ann Tatum – background vocals
- Bryan Garten – recording engineer
- Jeremy Nichols – recording engineer assistance
- Phil Tan – mixing engineer
- Bill Zimmerman – mixing engineer assistance
- Chris Gehringer – mastering engineer
- Will Quinnell – mastering engineer assisntance

== Charts ==
=== Weekly charts ===
Chart (2019)	Peak position
US R&B Digital Songs (Billboard)	17

== Release history ==
=== Promotional release ===
Region	Date	Format	Version	Label	Ref
Various	November 1, 2018	Digital download; streaming	Original	Epic	

=== Single release ===
Region	Date	Format	Version	Label	Ref
United States	March 4, 2019	Rhythmic contemporary	Original	Unknown	
United States	March 4, 2019	Urban contemporary	Original	Unknown	
Various	March 15, 2019	Digital download; streaming	Stefflon Don remix	Epic	
Various	April 5, 2019	Digital download; streaming	Shawni remix	Epic	
