= Right to Dream =

Single by Mariah Carey
- Released: October 20, 2008
- Recorded: 2008
- Genre: Country; acoustic
- Length: 3:32
- Label: Island Def Jam
- Songwriters: Mariah Carey; Willie Nelson

Mariah Carey singles chronology
"I'll Be Lovin' U Long Time" (2008)	"Right to Dream" (2008)	"I Stay in Love" (2008)

Audio video
- "Right to Dream" on YouTube

"Right to Dream" is a song from the film Tennessee. It was written by Mariah Carey and Willie Nelson, and released as a single on October 20, 2008 by Island Def Jam. On digital platforms, Carey is the only credited writer.

== Background ==
Deconstructing her songwriting process, Carey explains: "It was a different experience from an album project. I was very close to the story and in particular my character's struggle, so it made it easier for me as a writer. I just began channeling Krystal's pain and hope." "The song is basically a three-act play and chronicles the evolution of Krystal," says Carey. "I was humming different melodies while I was on the set and stuff," Carey says. "I was just thinking that Willie Nelson would be somebody fabulous to collaborate with. I reached out to him, and we met after one of his concerts."

The song, says Carey, is from the perspective of her Tennessee character Krystal, an aspiring singer. "The song has its own arc," Carey said. "She begins by telling us where she started, like she lays in bed and wonders where she left herself. A lot of people go through that sort of thing. It's kind of about empowerment."

== Release ==
The song was released to Adult Contemporary radio on October 20, 2008. It was digitally released in the United States on December 2, 2008.

== Critical reception ==
When the Los Angeles Times named "Right to Dream" as a contender for the Academy Award for Best Original Song the paper described the song as "restrained elegance, with some light, finger-picked guitar flourishes and a dash of late-night soul." Forty-nine songs from eligible feature-length motion pictures contended for nominations in the Original Song category for the 81st Academy Awards. "Right to Dream" was on the list, but did not make the final nominations.

== Music video ==
A music video was shot and released to promote the single and the film. It premiered on December 8, 2008. The video features clips from the movie as well as shots of Carey in the studio recording the song.

== Charts ==
Chart (2008–2009)	Peak position
US Adult Contemporary (Billboard)	24
