= The Sweet Sweet Fantasy Tour =

2016 concert tour by Mariah Carey

- Tour by Mariah Carey
- Location: Africa; Europe; North America
- Start date: March 15, 2016
- End date: November 26, 2016
- Legs: 4
- No. of shows: 31
- Box office: $6,768,754 (10 reported shows)

Mariah Carey concert chronology
- #1 to Infinity (2015–17); The Sweet Sweet Fantasy Tour (2016); All the Hits Tour (2017)

The Sweet Sweet Fantasy Tour was the ninth concert tour by American singer-songwriter Mariah Carey. The tour was featured prominently in the singer's docu-series Mariah's World.

The tour kicked off with a show at The SSE Hydro in Glasgow, Scotland, on March 15, 2016, and concluded with a show at the Neal S. Blaisdell Center in Honolulu, Hawaii, on November 26, 2016. The tour saw Carey play six venues across Great Britain and various others across Europe, as well as several dates in Africa. The Sweet Sweet Fantasy Tour is Carey's first tour to visit the European region in 13 years, the last being the Charmbracelet World Tour in 2003. It is also her first tour to visit Hawaii in almost two decades.

The tour's set list was noted by fans for including songs rarely or never before performed by Carey, such as "Loverboy", "Against All Odds (Take a Look at Me Now)" and "When You Believe".

== Set list ==
1. "Fantasy" (contains elements of the Def Club Mix and Bad Boy Fantasy remix)
2. "Emotions"
3. "My All" (Classic Club Mix)
4. "Always Be My Baby"
5. "I'll Be There" (with Trey Lorenz)
6. "Rock With You" (Interlude) (performed by Trey Lorenz)
7. "Touch My Body"
8. "I Know What You Want" / "Obsessed" / "It's Like That" / "Shake It Off" / "Loverboy" (dubbed the Car Ride Medley)
9. "Heartbreaker" (Desert Storm Remix)
10. "Against All Odds (Take a Look at Me Now)"
11. "One Sweet Day" (with Daniel Moore II and Trey Lorenz)
12. "When You Believe"
13. "Hero"
14. "We Belong Together"
15. "Without You"
16. "Butterfly Reprise" (Outro)

=== Notes ===
- "Against All Odds (Take a Look at Me Now)" was not performed on select dates.
- "One Sweet Day" was not performed in Luxembourg and Munich. It was eventually cut from the set list on November 8.
- "Rainbow" was performed in Oslo.
- "Can't Let Go" was performed in Kraków.
- In Cape Town, Carey performed "Fly Like a Bird" in place of "Against All Odds (Take a Look at Me Now)".
- During shows in Durban and Johannesburg, "Don't Forget About Us" replaced "Against All Odds (Take a Look at Me Now)". It was later permanently done for shows in Honolulu.
- On November 8, "Breakdown" and "Honey" were added to the set list.
- During shows in Mexico, "Babydoll" and "I Still Believe" were performed.
- Starting on November 23, "Vision of Love", "Infamous", and "#Beautiful" were added to the set list; the latter two being performed with Jussie Smollett. Additionally, "I'll Be There" and "Without You" were no longer performed.
- During the final show in Honolulu, "All I Want for Christmas Is You" was played as the outro.

== Shows ==
Date	City	Country	Venue
Leg 1 — Europe
March 15, 2016	Glasgow	Scotland	SSE Hydro
March 17, 2016	Leeds	England	First Direct Arena
March 18, 2016	Manchester	England	Manchester Arena
March 20, 2016	Birmingham	England	Barclaycard Arena
March 21, 2016	Cardiff	Wales	Motorpoint Arena
March 23, 2016	London	England	The O_{2} Arena
March 26, 2016	Esch-sur-Alzette	Luxembourg	Rockhal
March 29, 2016	Copenhagen	Denmark	Forum Copenhagen
March 31, 2016	Oslo	Norway	Oslo Spektrum
April 2, 2016	Stockholm	Sweden	Ericsson Globe
April 4, 2016	Helsinki	Finland	Hartwall Arena
April 6, 2016	Tallinn	Estonia	Saku Suurhall
April 7, 2016	Riga	Latvia	Arēna Rīga
April 9, 2016	Kaunas	Lithuania	Žalgiris Arena
April 11, 2016	Kraków	Poland	Tauron Arena
April 13, 2016	Cologne	Germany	Lanxess Arena
April 14, 2016	Munich	Germany	Olympiahalle
April 16, 2016	Milan	Italy	Mediolanum Forum
April 18, 2016	Zürich	Switzerland	Hallenstadion
April 19, 2016	Vienna	Austria	Wiener Stadthalle
April 21, 2016	Paris	France	AccorHotels Arena
April 23, 2016	Amsterdam	Netherlands	Ziggo Dome
Leg 2 — Africa
April 26, 2016	Cape Town	South Africa	Cape Town Stadium
April 29, 2016	Durban	South Africa	Moses Mabhida Stadium
May 1, 2016	Johannesburg	South Africa	Ticketpro Dome
May 2, 2016	Johannesburg	South Africa	Ticketpro Dome
Leg 3 — North America
November 8, 2016	Mexico City	Mexico	Mexico City Arena
November 9, 2016	Monterrey	Mexico	Arena Monterrey
November 23, 2016	Honolulu	United States	Neal S. Blaisdell Arena
November 25, 2016	Honolulu	United States	Neal S. Blaisdell Arena
November 26, 2016	Honolulu	United States	Neal S. Blaisdell Arena

== Cancelled shows ==
List of cancelled concerts, showing date, city, country, venue and reason of cancellation
Date	City	Country	Venue	Reason
March 27, 2016	Brussels	Belgium	Forest National	2016 Brussels bombings
October 28, 2016	Buenos Aires	Argentina	GEBA Jorge Newbery	"Promoter negligence"
October 30, 2016	Santiago	Chile	Movistar Arena	"Promoter negligence"
November 1, 2016	São Paulo	Brazil	Allianz Parque	"Promoter negligence"
November 4, 2016	Curitiba	Brazil	Pedreira Paulo Leminski	"Promoter negligence"
November 5, 2016	Porto Alegre	Brazil	Estádio Beira-Rio	"Promoter negligence"

== Box office score data ==
List of concerts, showing venue, city, tickets sold, number of available tickets and amount of gross revenue
Venue	City	Attendance / Capacity	Revenue
SSE Hydro	Glasgow	3,506 / 3,835	$311,091
Manchester Arena	Manchester	9,055 / 9,960	$843,966
Barclaycard Arena	Birmingham	8,470 / 9,458	$764,454
The O_{2} Arena	London	15,189 / 16,076	$1,412,500
Rockhal	Esch-sur-Alzette	4,500 / 6,500	
Mediolanum Forum	Milan	5,393 / 5,393	$471,929
Hallenstadion	Zürich	4,007 / 9,500	$284,757
AccorHotels Arena	Paris	9,458 / 11,612	$866,591
Cape Town Stadium	Cape Town	14,420 / 15,817	$518,723
Moses Mabhida Stadium	Durban	18,403 / 19,135	$570,866
Ticketpro Dome	Johannesburg	20,014 / 21,203	$1,195,806
Arena Ciudad de Mexico	Mexico City	11,054 / 11,054	$331,489
Total		130,469 / 147,543 (88%)	$7,572,172

== Personnel ==
- James "Big Jim" Wright – musical director
- Daniel Moore II – keyboards
- Derrieuz Edgecombe – keyboards
- Lance Tolbert – bass
- Joshua Baker – drums
- Trey Lorenz – background vocals
- Mary Ann Tatum – background vocals
- Takeytha Johnson – background vocals
