= The Star (Mariah Carey song) =

Promotional single by Mariah Carey

from the album The Star (Original Motion Picture Soundtrack)
- Released: October 19, 2017
- Genre: Christmas
- Length: 4:01
- Label: Epic
- Songwriters: Mariah Carey; Marc Shaiman
- Producers: Mariah Carey; Marc Shaiman

Mariah Carey singles chronology
"Unforgettable (Remix)" (2017)	"The Star" (2017)	"GTFO" (2018)

Music video
- "The Star" on YouTube

"The Star" is a song performed by American singer-songwriter Mariah Carey. It was released on October 19, 2017, as the first release from the soundtrack of the film of the same name. The song was nominated for the Best Original Song at the 75th Golden Globe Awards.

== Composition ==
The song is performed in the key of B major with a tempo of 118 beats per minute. The first half of the final chorus is in the key of D♭ major with the last half and outro of the song set in E♭ major. Carey's vocals span from F♯_{3} to D♭_{5}.

== Music video ==
The music video for the song was released on November 16, 2017. It features scenes of Carey in a white gown interlaced with clips from the film. Carey's twins, Moroccan and Monroe Cannon, are present at the end of the video singing the hook, "follow your heart; it's Christmas".

== Critical reception ==
Hugh McIntyre from Fuse felt that the record "was made for a 90's Disney animated film", mentioning that "Carey doesn't push herself on the ballad, keeping things simple and sweet instead". Mikey Fresh from Vibe writes that Mariah "uses her signature vocals to capture the X-mas spirit on the animated movie's title track." Reviewing the song, Lucas Villa from AXS states that "Piano and twinkling production back Mariah recounting the magical night Jesus was born." Victoria Messina from PopSugar wrote that "this brand-new jam just might give 'All I Want for Christmas Is You' a run for its money."

== Commercial performance ==
The song ranked at No. 6 on the Billboard US Holiday Digital Song Sales in 2017.

== Charts ==
Chart (2017)	Peak position
US Adult Contemporary (Billboard)	28
US Christian Airplay (Billboard)	49
US Holiday Digital Song Sales (Billboard)	6
US Kid Digital Song Sales (Billboard)	9
