= In the Mix (Mariah Carey song) =

Single by Mariah Carey
- Released: September 17, 2019
- Recorded: July–August 2019
- Genre: R&B
- Length: 2:55
- Label: Mariah Carey; ABC Studios
- Songwriters: Carey; Moore II
- Producers: Carey; Daniel Moore II

Mariah Carey singles chronology
"A No No" (2019)	"In the Mix" (2019)	"Save the Day" (2020)

Music video
- "In the Mix" on YouTube

"In the Mix" is a song by American singer-songwriter Mariah Carey. It was released on September 17, 2019 as the official theme song of the American TV series Mixed-ish, that premiered on September 24, 2019 on ABC. The song's music was composed by Carey along with songwriter-producer Daniel Moore II, and the lyrics and melody were written by Carey. It was also co-produced by Carey and Moore. The accompanying music video was released the same day as the single's release, featuring clips from Mixed-ish, as well as footage of Carey and her children in the recording studio.

== Background and release ==
As a biracial woman in the entertainment industry, there was no way I did not want to be a part of mixed-ish, especially after seeing the pilot, which I loved.

— Carey in an interview for Entertainment Tonight.

On August 5, 2019, Carey confirmed that she will release "In the Mix", serving as the series' theme song. Carey's children, Moroccan and Monroe, provided some background vocals on the song. Her musical director at the time, songwriter-producer Daniel Moore II, produced the song along with Carey.

On September 17, 2019, Carey debuted the song to partygoers at the "Embrace Your Ish" premiere event at Goya Studios in Los Angeles, alongside Mixed-ish creators Kenya Barris and Tracee Ellis Ross.

== Critical reception ==
Althea Legaspi from Rolling Stone called the chorus “uplifting”, and described Carey’s whistle register as “tingly”.

== Music video ==
On September 17, 2019, the accompanying music video was released on ABC's YouTube channel and features clips from the show, as well as footage of Carey and her children recording the song in the studio.

== Charts ==
=== Weekly charts ===
Chart (2019)	Peak position
Hungary (Single Top 40)	20
US R&B Digital Songs (Billboard)	9
