= I Don't (Mariah Carey song) =

2017 single by Mariah Carey and YG

Single by Mariah Carey featuring YG
- Released: February 3, 2017
- Genre: Trap; R&B
- Length: 4:16
- Label: Epic
- Songwriters: Mariah Carey; Keenon Jackson; Johntá Austin; Crystal Nicole Pompey; Donell Jones; Kyle West
- Producers: Jermaine Dupri; Bryan-Michael Cox

Mariah Carey singles chronology
"Infinity" (2015)	"I Don't" (2017)	"With You" (2018)

YG singles chronology
"One Time Comin'" (2016)	"I Don't" (2017)	"Childish" (2017)

Music video
- "I Don't" on YouTube

"I Don't" is a song by American singer Mariah Carey featuring American rapper YG. The song was written by Carey, YG, Johntá Austin, Crystal Nicole Pompey, Donell Jones, and Kyle West and produced by Jermaine Dupri and Bryan-Michael Cox. Carey previewed the track during the final episode of her E! docuseries, Mariah's World, on January 29, 2017. Epic Records released it as a single five days later on February 3. The song samples Jones's song "Where I Wanna Be".

== Production and release ==
He was very focused in the studio. He wrote his rhyme and then out of nowhere, he came up with the "I know you love me" part and I loved that [singing] section. I feel like he was a perfect collaboration because he really focuses on what he's doing.

— Carey on working with YG.

Carey debuted "I Don't" during an episode of her E! docuseries, Mariah's World, on January 29, 2017. Footage of Carey recording a snippet of the song in a studio booth was broadcast during the episode, which Hugh McIntyre of Forbes described as "perfect timing as far as promotion goes". Two days later on January 31, the cover art was revealed by Carey via her official Twitter; it shows the singer in the backseat of a white car with red leathers and accompanied by the track's featured rapper, YG, riding shotgun. Epic Records subsequently released the track for download on February 3, 2017. On March 24, 2017, a remix featuring Remy Ma was released.

== Critical reception ==
Mike Wiss of Idolator described the song as being as "legendary" as the artwork: "Mariah Carey has had a really tough year. She literally rang in 2017 with one of the worst (not-quite) live performances of all time and endured the various humiliations of Mariah's World. He added: "Happily, everything else is spot on. Mariah's voice is in fine form and the decision to interpolate Donnell Jones' "Where I Wanna Be" is inspired." Hugh McIntyre from Forbes wrote that the song "doesn’t see the pop star stepping too far out of the comfort zone she’s created over the past decade, opting for a laid back vibe that may please her true devotees, but which might not be uptempo enough to catch the attention of fairweather fans".

== Music video ==
The music video for the song premiered via Carey's Vevo channel on February 3, 2017. It depicts Carey forlorn by her breakup, wearing a wedding dress only to eventually burn it. She moves in and out of a car in various outfits, from latex to lace. At one point, Carey wears an engagement ring on her middle finger, before pointing it at the camera. Carey directed the video herself and executive-produced the video with her former manager, Stella Bulochnikov.

== Live performances ==
Carey and YG performed "I Don't" live on Jimmy Kimmel Live! on February 15, 2017. A few days later, she performed the song live at Dubai Jazz Festival.

== Track listing ==
Digital download
No.	Title	Length
1.	"I Don't" (featuring YG)	4:16

Remix – Digital download
No.	Title	Length
1.	"I Don't" (featuring Remy Ma and YG)	3:42

== Charts ==
Chart performance for "I Don't"
Chart (2017)	Peak position
Australia Urban (ARIA)	17
Canada Hot 100 (Billboard)	96
France (SNEP)	102
Hungary (Single Top 40)	10
UK Singles Downloads (Official Charts)	60
US Billboard Hot 100	89
US Hot R&B/Hip-Hop Songs (Billboard)	35

== Release history ==
Release history and formats for "I Don't"
Region	Date	Format	Label	Ref
United States	February 3, 2017	Digital download	Epic	
United Kingdom	February 3, 2017	Digital download	Epic	
United States	March 24, 2017	Remix – Digital download	Epic	
United Kingdom	March 24, 2017	Remix – Digital download	Epic	
