= Tennessee (film) =

- DVD cover
- Directed by: Aaron Woodley
- Written by: Russell Schaumberg
- Produced by: Lee Daniels
- Starring: Ethan Peck; Adam Rothenberg; Mariah Carey
- Cinematography: David Greene
- Edited by: Steve Edwards
- Music by: Mariah Carey; Mario Grigorov
- Production company: Lee Daniels Entertainment
- Distributed by: Vivendi Entertainment
- Release dates: April 26, 2008 (Tribeca Film Festival); June 5, 2009
- Running time: 100 minutes
- Country: United States
- Language: English
- Box office: $16,100

Tennessee is a 2008 American road drama film directed by Aaron Woodley, produced by Lee Daniels, and starring Ethan Peck, Adam Rothenberg, and Mariah Carey. The film was distributed through Lee Daniels Entertainment, before the rights were acquired by Vivendi Entertainment.

The film follows Carter (Rothenberg) and his younger brother, Ellis (Peck). as they return to Tennessee to find their father, a potential donor match for Ellis's leukemia. Along the way, they befriend an aspiring singer, Krystal (Carey) and escape her abusive husband, Frank (Lance Reddick). The film premiered at the 2008 Tribeca Film Festival and received generally mixed reviews. Carey also co-wrote the film's theme song, "Right to Dream" with American singer Willie Nelson.

== Plot ==
In 1993, Carter leaves his girlfriend, Laurel, in Tennessee with his mom and younger brother Ellis, to escape his abusive dad. In 2007, a grown up Carter discovers that his brother Ellis has acute leukemia. Ellis tells Carter that they need to go back to Tennessee to find their dad who will have a donor match for Ellis' bone marrow transplant since Carter is not and their mother is already deceased.

On their way to Tennessee, their car breaks down and they stop at a local diner. They meet and become acquainted with Krystal, a waitress who dreams of becoming a singer-songwriter. She gives the boys a ride to her house, saying they can stay the night, much to the dismay of her abusive husband Frank, who is also the town's sheriff. Krystal, wanting to get away from Frank, decides to leave with Carter and Ellis to Tennessee and stay with a friend. The trio stop at a bar where Carter gets drunk and into an altercation. Meanwhile, Frank reports Krystal as having been kidnapped by Carter and Ellis, and tracks them using the plate number of her car, to which Krystal trades with another one. Despite this, Frank finds and chases them on the road. The three of them escape on a nearby train headed to Tennessee.

Arriving at Tennessee, Carter, Ellis and Krystal have run out of money. Krystal attempts to pawn her guitar but Carter stops her after seeing a flyer for a singing contest in a bar, suggesting that she compete instead for the $500 prize. Frank, having followed them, arrives at the bar and sees a girl being abused by her boyfriend. He reflects on his own relationship, watches her perform, and decides to not pursue her anymore. After winning, Krystal splits the prize money with Carter and Ellis and they split ways. While on the bus, Ellis passes out and is rushed to a hospital. After waking up, Ellis asks Carter for a picture of a mountain near the local school. Carter later finds out that his ex-girlfriend Laurel is there working as a teacher. Carter also heads to his old house to find his father, but discovers that he does not live there anymore.

With the company of both Carter and Krystal, Ellis eventually succumbs to his leukemia. The two scatter his ashes on the top of the mountain. Krystal heads off to pursue her music dream in Nashville and Carter tells her that he will be waiting for her big break as a singer. Carter visits his father's grave and the pastor at the local church gives him a package. Carter finds out that the package was made by Ellis which contains a letter saying that he knew about their father's death all along and decided to plan a trip to Tennessee in order for Carter to face his fear of returning home to Tennessee. He also said that the picture he made him take was for him to find out that Laurel was still there and to take this chance to talk to her again. Later, Carter approaches Laurel.

== Cast ==
- Ethan Peck as Ellis Armstrong
- Adam Rothenberg as Carter Armstrong
  - Ryan Lynn as young Carter
- Mariah Carey as Krystal
- Lance Reddick as Frank
- Michele Harris as Karen Armstrong
- Bill Sage as Roy Armstrong
- Melissa Benoist as Laurel

== Music ==
Mariah Carey co-wrote "Right to Dream" with Willie Nelson and performed it with Nelson's harmonica player, Mickey Raphael, for the movie's soundtrack.

In May 2010, Carey's cover of Kris Kristofferson's "Help Me Make It Through the Night," was leaked online. It was originally supposed to appear on the Tennessee soundtrack.

== Release ==
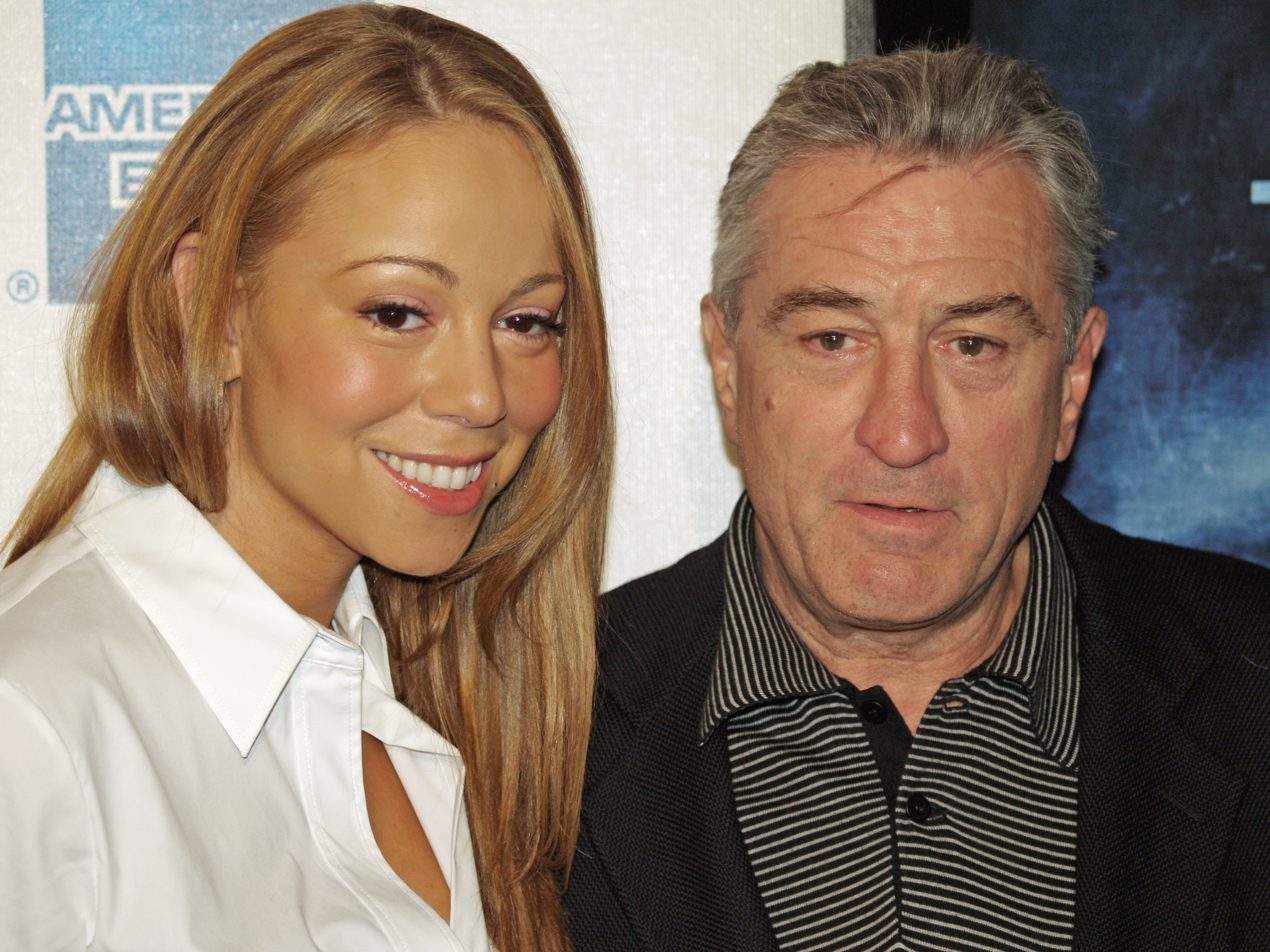
Carey with Robert De Niro at the 2008 Tribeca Film Festival, where the film had its premiere.

The premiere of Tennessee took place at the Tribeca Film Festival on April 26, 2008. Tennessee was released to 15 theaters on June 5, 2009. Playing in limited release, Tennessee has grossed $9,438 from 15 theaters for a per-screen average of $629 in its opening weekend. As of June 24, it grossed a total of $16,100.

=== Home media ===
The DVD, initially scheduled for release on September 1, 2009, was released on January 26, 2010, in accordance with the film's official promotional site. A Blu-ray version of the film has yet to be released in the US, instead getting released in Canada. The disc is presented in the original theatrical aspect ratio in HD but with only lossy audio, no subtitles, and no special features.

== Critical reception ==
Critical response for the film was generally mixed, with Metacritic calculating an average rating of 42% based on 8 reviews. Based on 20 reviews collected by Rotten Tomatoes, Tennessee had an average rating of 35% with an average score of 4.5/10. Its consensus says "Despite some beautiful scenery, Tennessee can't extend its simple premise beyond typical independent road trip movie tropes." The Hollywood Reporter said that the pacing is off and that the movie meanders until it reaches its unexpectedly powerful conclusion.
