= Mariah's World =

Reality show

- Genre: Reality docuseries
- Starring: Mariah Carey
- Country of origin: United States
- Original language: English
- No. of seasons: 1
- No. of episodes: 8

Production
- Executive producers: Mariah Carey; Stella Bulochnikov
- Camera setup: Multiple
- Running time: 42 minutes
- Production companies: Bunim/Murray Productions; Magic Carpet Productions

Original release
- Network: E!
- Release: December 4, 2016 – January 29, 2017

Mariah's World is an American reality show that premiered on December 4, 2016 on the E! cable network. Announced in March 2016, the eight-episode series follows the life of singer Mariah Carey as she begins her The Sweet Sweet Fantasy Tour around Europe and plans to get married. "I refuse to call it a reality show," said Carey in an interview with The New York Times. She further commented that the goal of the series is for her fans to get to know her personality better and not to show that, "Here I am, getting my nails done."

== Episodes ==
No.	Title	Original release date	U.S. viewers (millions)
1	"For Love of the Tour"	December 4, 2016	2.2
2	"Bone of Contention"	December 11, 2016	0.81
3	"Crossing Borders"	December 18, 2016	0.73
4	"Mimi's Anniversary"	January 1, 2017	0.54
5	"Catching Feelings"	January 8, 2017	0.55
6	"The Show Must Go On"	January 15, 2017	0.61
7	"Got Me Feeling Emotions"	January 22, 2017	0.51
8	"We Belong Together"	January 29, 2017	0.51

== Reception ==
Mariah's World has received generally mixed-to-negative reviews from television critics. Rotten Tomatoes accumulated a 44% "rotten" rating. Similarly, review aggregator website Metacritic calculated a mean average rating of 51 out of 100, indicating "mixed or average reviews".

== Broadcast ==
Internationally, the series has aired in Australia and New Zealand on the local version of E! in simulcast with the American premiere.

The series has aired in the UK, Ireland and France on the local version of E! on December 16, 2016.
