= GTFO (Mariah Carey song) =

2018 single by Mariah Carey

Promotional single by Mariah Carey

from the album Caution
- Released: September 13, 2018
- Recorded: 2018
- Studio: Cha Cha Studios (Beverly Hills, CA); Westlake Recording Studios (Hollywood, CA)
- Genre: R&B; soul
- Length: 3:27
- Label: Epic
- Songwriters: Mariah Carey; Bibi Bourelly; Porter Robinson; Jordon Manswell; Paul "Nineteen85" Jeffries
- Producers: Mariah Carey; Porter Robinson; Nineteen85; Jordon Manswell

Music video
- "GTFO" on YouTube

"GTFO" (an abbreviation for "Get the fuck out") is a song by American singer-songwriter Mariah Carey. On September 13, 2018, Epic Records released the song as a promotional single from Carey's fifteenth studio album Caution. "GTFO" was written by Carey, Bibi Bourelly, Porter Robinson, Paul "Nineteen85" Jeffries and Jordon Manswell, with the latter two also producing the song. It samples Porter Robinson's 2014 song "Goodbye to a World".

== Release ==
I wanted to give my fans and everyone a first listen that wasn't so serious. I've had so much fun making this album, and I wanted the first moment to reflect that light-hearted spirit.

— Carey on releasing "GTFO" as a promotional single.

Carey announced "GTFO" would be the first promotional single from her then upcoming fifteenth studio album with the release via press release.

== Critical reception ==
Israel Daramola from Spin was positive, calling it a "ghostly, tender record with a magnetic rhythm". Randall Colburn from Consequence of Sound praised Carey's vocal performance and the song's instrumentation, noting "the song's dreamy flow clashes compellingly." R. Eric Thomas of Elle was also positive stating the track was "[a] sultry mid-tempo addition", noted that song "enters a grand tradition of songs about being told to get out." Billboard editor Gil Kaufman described the song's production as "spiky". It was included at number 59 on Idolator's list of the 100 best singles of 2018, and at number 92 on NPR's list of the 100 best songs of 2018.

== Music video ==
The music video for the song was directed by Sarah McColgan. It was premiered via Carey's Vevo channel on September 14, 2018.

== Live performances ==
Mariah Carey performed "GTFO" for the first time at the 2018 iHeartRadio Music Festival. It was also performed at her 2019 Caution World Tour.

== Track listing ==
Digital download

1. "GTFO" – 3:27

== Charts ==
Chart (2018)	Peak position
France Downloads (SNEP)	98
Greece Digital Songs (Billboard)	5
Hungary (Single Top 40)	13
Spain Physical/Digital (PROMUSICAE)	6
UK Singles Downloads (Official Charts)	74
US Hot R&B Songs (Billboard)	23
US R&B/Hip-Hop Digital Songs (Billboard)	19

== Release history ==
Region	Date	Format	Label	Ref
United States	September 13, 2018	Digital download	Epic	
