= Side Effects (Mariah Carey song) =

2008 song by Mariah Carey

Song by Mariah Carey featuring Young Jeezy

from the album E=MC²
- Studio: Honeysouth Studios (Miami, FL)
- Genre: R&B
- Length: 4:22
- Label: Island Def Jam
- Songwriters: Mariah Carey; Scott Storch; Jay Jenkins; Crystal Johnson
- Producers: Carey; Storch

"Side Effects" is a song by American singer Mariah Carey from her eleventh studio album, E=MC² (2008). It was written by Carey, Scott Storch, Crystal Johnson and the song's featured artist, Young Jeezy. It was inspired by Carey's marriage to record executive Tommy Mottola and his controlling nature over her and her career. Carey discusses how she still deals with the side effects of the experiences that she encountered during the relationship. Critical response to the song was positive, with many critics highlighting it as an album standout, praising its candid lyrics and honesty. It charted at number 93 on the US Billboard Pop 100 chart.

== Background ==
Tommy was a deeply controlling husband who left Carey feeling confined to the house (where she obsessively over-decorated). He aggressively dictated every aspect of her career, from the music to her sexless clothes to her holographic public persona, taught as she was 'to say as little as possible, don't be yourself'."
—Silvia Patterson, The Daily Telegraph.

In 1988, Carey moved to Manhattan, New York to pursue a career in music. After working as a background singer for rising pop singer Brenda K. Starr, Carey was introduced to Tommy Mottola, head of Columbia Records, at a record executives gala. Accompanied by Starr, Carey handed Mottola her demo tape, featuring four of the eleven songs that would eventually comprise her debut studio album.

In what has been largely described as a "Cinderella-like story", Mottola heard the tape in his Limousine ride home, and quickly returned to the event to find the girl with the "elusive voice". When he arrived, Carey had already left early, disappointed in the events of the evening. In what became a search, Mottola began to track Carey down through Star's management and eventually signed her to Columbia's roster of artists. After the release of her self-titled debut album (1990), Carey rose to fame, with the album selling over 15 million units globally. During the recording of Carey's third album, Music Box (1993), the pair became romantically involved, and wed by August 1993, only one month short of the album's release. The couple moved into a large 12-bedroom mansion in upstate New York, a home Carey would later come to be described as a "private prison" and "golden cage".

Referring to Columbia, Carey said in an interview "That company, made a billion dollars from the raggedy girl he met at that party." Throughout the marriage, Mottola, both Carey's husband and boss, carefully manipulated and controlled her career, crafting her into the adult contemporary/pop singer he sought her to be. With each album, Carey's genre influences and production styles evolved, leading her farther into R&B and hip-hop territory. By 1994, Carey was already the best-selling artist of the 1990s, and the labels best-selling act. Due to her continued success, Carey was able to take more creative control over subsequent projects.

During the recording sessions for her fifth album Daydream (1995), the couple had already begun "fighting at the drop of a feather", due to his controlling nature over their personal life and her career. They separated in 1997, and divorced the following year. Carey described her sixth album Butterfly (1997) as her magnum opus, and her greatest and most personal work, due to its personal and emotional background. On the album's title track – written by Carey for Mottola – Carey reached out to him, asking to allow her to be free like a 'butterfly', and if the two were 'meant to be', then the butterfly 'would return'. In an interview with Interview magazine, Carey described the importance the song held for her, as well as its meaning:

It was '97 and I was leaving my marriage [to Tommy Mottola]. which encompassed my life. I was writing the song 'Butterfly' wishing that that's what he would say to me. There's a part that goes, 'I have learned that beauty/has to flourish in the light/wild horses run unbridled/or their spirit dies/you have given me the courage/to be all that I can/and I truly feel ...[sings] and I truly feel your heart will lead you back to me when you're ready to land.' At that point I really believed that I was going to go back to the marriage – I didn't think I was going to leave forever. But then the things that happened to me during that time caused me to not go back. Had it been, 'Go be yourself, you've been with me since you were a kid, let's separate for a while,' I probably would've."

"Butterfly" became what Carey later described as her "favorite and most heartfelt ballad." Its lyrics were very personal, linking to her personal life and relationship with Mottola. Carey wrote "Butterfly" for Mottola, hoping he would say its contents to her, and choose to do what was best for her. She described it as "the best ballad she had ever written" and credited it as the epitome of Butterfly.

== Production and composition ==
"Side Effects" was written by Carey, Scott Storch, Crystal Johnson and featured artist Young Jeezy. It is an R&B song with elements of electro. Lyrically, Carey is recounting a past relationship which fell into "violent times", and how she still deals with the effects of what she experienced. Carey begins with the line "I was a girl/ You were ‘the man'/ I was too young to understand/ I was naïve /Believing everything you told me." Although Carey never mentions Mottola's name, many critics believed that she was addressing him directly in the lines "Shining like a chandelier/ That decorated every room inside/ The private hell we built", "Sleeping with the enemy, aware that he was smothering every last part of me" and "Said you were strong/ Protecting me/ Then I found out that you were weak/ Keepin' me there, under your thumb/ Cause you were scared that I'd become much/ More than you could handle." After confessing that she would "[wake] up scared some nights, still dreaming about the violent times," Carey decides to walk away from the relationship, and declares "but I still live with the side effects".

J. Freedom De Luc of The Washington Post likened the "echoing" repetition of "Side Effects" to that of Rihanna's on her 2007 single "Umbrella". In an interview with Jennifer Vineyard of MTV News, Carey explained why she felt compelled to write the song:

"I wrote it because it was necessary for me to write it. You know what? I’ve been through too much at this point, I want happiness and I want pure and real love, but the side effects of what other relationships have put me through cause me to be kind of on the defensive a lot of the time. And if somebody isn’t mature or caring and loving and open-hearted enough to understand that, then it’s tough, but this is a song for people who need that."

== Reception ==
The Guardian's Alex Macpherson praised the song, writing "the magnificent Side Effects finds Carey at the height of her powers. Over synths as slow as molasses, she intones some of the darkest lyrics of her career, a meditation on the long-term effects of an abusive relationship. Verbose to the point of opulence, she crams syllables into the verses, races against her own emotions and perfectly conveys the song's claustrophobic intensity." Joey Guerra from the Houston Chronicle singled out "Side Effects" as "an electro-tinged standout" in his review of the album. He praised Storch and Young Jeezy for giving the song a "menacing mood". Writing for Fox News, Roger Friedman described Carey's vocals performance as "gorgeous", Jeezy's rap verse as "cool" and the hook as having Top 40 appeal. He continued to write that Mottola would most likely do a spit-take upon hearing the lyrics.

Describing the song as "a not-so-thinly-veiled swipe" at Mottola, Evan Sawdey of PopMatters thought that the lyrical content would "raise some eyebrows". The New York Times writer Ben Ratliff labeled the track as a "drama bomb" which recounts how Carey lived under the spell of Mottola during their marriage. The Washington Post's J. Freedom De Luc thought that "Side Effects" was one of the album's highlights along with "Touch My Body" and "I Wish You Well", and continued to write that Carey appears to be unloading onto her ex-husband. Nick Levine from Digital Spy described the song as Carey's revenge on Mottola, and "her rawest, most personal track in years". Jayanthi Daniels of The New York Sun was critical of "Side Effects" as well as "I'm That Chick", describing them as "throwaway pop tracks" on a hip-hop album.

== Live performances ==
On July 31, 2008, Carey performed a free concert at the Hollywood and Highland Center shopping mall in Los Angeles, California, for 2,000 people. Young Jeezy joined Carey on stage to perform "Side Effects"; Todd Martens of the LA Times said of the performance that his "gruff intonations providing a surprisingly effective counterbalance to Carey's pleasantly light phrasing". Carey also performed "We Belong Together", "Shake It Off" and a medley of "Touch My Body/I'll Be Lovin' U Long Time". The concert was filmed and presented on Jimmy Kimmel Live!, as part of Samsung AT&T Summer Krush concert series. The production cost of the concert was estimated to be $250,000; according to Kimmel's music booker Scott Igoe. He confirmed that the cost was not incurred by Kimmel, and that Samsung made a contribution because "Carey doesn't come cheap".

== Charts ==
Chart (2008)	Peak position
US Pop 100 (Billboard)	93

== Sources ==
- Nickson, Chris (1998). Mariah Carey revisited: her story. St. Martin's Press. ISBN 978-0-312-19512-0.
- Shapiro, Marc (2001). Mariah Carey: The Unauthorized Biography. ECW Press. ISBN 978-1-55022-444-3.
