= Mariah Carey: Live in Concert =

2018 concert tour by Mariah Carey

- Continental tour by Mariah Carey
- Location: Asia
- Start date: October 16, 2018
- End date: November 9, 2018
- Legs: 1
- No. of shows: 12

Mariah Carey concert chronology
- The Butterfly Returns (2018–20); Mariah Carey: Live in Concert (2018); Caution World Tour (2019)

Mariah Carey: Live in Concert was an Asian concert tour by American singer-songwriter Mariah Carey.

== Background ==
Originally due to take place in February 2018 with tour dates in Australia and New Zealand, Carey rescheduled the tour to October 2018. In a statement issued by promoter MJR Group, the reason for the change was "due to a necessary realignment of her international engagements for 2018." The revised schedule also meant changes to some venues and the cancellation of the Perth show. Concert dates for the Asian leg of the tour were later added in the spring, however it was announced in August 2018 that rescheduled Oceania leg of the tour was cancelled due to scheduling conflicts.

== Set list ==
Fly Away (Butterfly Reprise)" (intro)

Act I

1. "Honey"
2. "Shake It Off"
3. "Make It Happen"

"Make It Happen" / "Sweetheart" / "Say Somethin'" / "Loverboy" / "Dreamlover" (background singers interlude)

Act II

4. "Fantasy" (Bad Boy Fantasy)
5. "Always Be My Baby"
6. "Vision of Love"
7. "Emotions" (followed by band introductions)

Act III

"Migrate" (dancer introductions)

8. "#Beautiful" (with Daniel Moore II)
9. "One Sweet Day" (with Daniel Moore II and Trey Lorenz)
10. "Can't Let Go"
11. "With You"
12. "My All"

Act IV

"I'm That Chick" (dancers interlude)

13. "It's Like That" (contains elements of "Sucker M.C.'s" and "Here We Go" by Run-DMC)
14. "Love Hangover / Heartbreaker"
15. "Touch My Body"
16. "We Belong Together"
17. "Hero" (with extended outro)

=== Notes ===
- "Love Hangover / Heartbreaker" was not performed in Kuala Lumpur, Osaka, Tokyo and Bangkok.
- The "I'm That Chick" interlude was replaced by "Rock with You" performed by Trey Lorenz in Kuala Lumpur.
- "With You" was replaced by "Love Takes Time" in Kuala Lumpur, Shenzhen and Shanghai.
- In Macau, Mariah's children Moroccan and Monroe joined her on stage during the performance of "Hero".
- "#Beautiful" was replaced by "Don’t Forget About Us" in Shenzhen.
- The "Hero Reprise" outro was replaced by "Butterfly Reprise" in Kuala Lumpur, Taipei, Macau and Shenzhen.
- "All I Want for Christmas Is You" was performed as an encore in Osaka and Tokyo.
- "Can't Let Go" was replaced by "The Distance" in Tokyo, Singapore, Magelang and Bangkok.
- "Vision of Love" was replaced by "Love Takes Time" in Singapore and Magelang.
- An a cappella snippet of "Through the Rain" was performed in Magelang.
- "With You" was replaced by "I Don't Wanna Cry" in Magelang.
- "Touch My Body" was replaced by "Don't Forget About Us" in Magelang.
- "Vision of Love" was replaced by "Fly Like a Bird" in Bangkok.
- "One Sweet Day" was not performed in Bangkok.

== Shows ==
List of concerts, showing date, city, country, venue, opening acts, tickets sold, number of available tickets and amount of gross revenue
Date	City	Country	Venue	Attendance
Asia
October 16, 2018	Kuala Lumpur	Malaysia	Plenary Hall	—N/a
October 18, 2018	Taoyuan (Note: Promoted as Taipei.)	Taiwan	NTSU Arena	—N/a
October 20, 2018	Macau		Cotai Arena	—N/a
October 22, 2018	Shenzhen	China	Shenzhen Bay Sports Center	13,000 / 13,000
October 24, 2018	Shanghai	China	Mercedes-Benz Arena	18,000 / 18,000
October 26, 2018	Quezon City	Philippines	Smart Araneta Coliseum	—N/a
October 29, 2018	Osaka	Japan	Osaka Municipal Central Gymnasium	10,000 / 10,000 (Note: Estimated attendance.)
October 31, 2018	Tokyo	Japan	Nippon Budokan	20,000 / 20,000
November 1, 2018	Tokyo	Japan	Nippon Budokan	20,000 / 20,000
November 3, 2018	Singapore		The Star Performing Arts Centre	—N/a
November 6, 2018	Magelang	Indonesia	Borobudur Temple	—N/a
November 9, 2018	Bangkok	Thailand	Bitec Hall 106	—N/a
Total				61,000 / 61,000 (100%)

== Cancelled shows ==
List of cancelled concerts, showing date, city, country, venue, reason for cancellation
Date	City	Country	Venue	Reason
October 5, 2018	Perth	Australia	Perth Arena	Scheduling conflicts
October 7, 2018	Auckland	New Zealand	Spark Arena	Scheduling conflicts
October 10, 2018	Melbourne	Australia	Rod Laver Arena	Scheduling conflicts
October 12, 2018	Sydney	Australia	Qudos Bank Arena	Scheduling conflicts
October 14, 2018	Brisbane	Australia	Sandstone Point	Scheduling conflicts
