= The Butterfly Returns =

2018–20 concert residency by Mariah Carey

- Residency by Mariah Carey
- Location: Paradise, Nevada, U.S.
- Venue: The Colosseum at Caesars Palace
- Start date: July 5, 2018
- End date: February 29, 2020
- Legs: 4
- No. of shows: 25

Mariah Carey concert chronology
- All the Hits Tour (2017); The Butterfly Returns (2018–20); Mariah Carey: Live in Concert (2018)
Mariah Carey concert residency chronology
#1 to Infinity (2015-17)	The Butterfly Returns (2018–20)	The Celebration of Mimi (2024–25)

The Butterfly Returns was a concert residency by American singer-songwriter Mariah Carey at Caesars Palace on the Las Vegas Strip in Paradise, Nevada. It began on July 5, 2018 and concluded on February 29, 2020. This was Carey's second concert residency placed in Las Vegas since #1 to Infinity (2015–17).

== Background ==
Carey announced the residency on April 30, 2018 on Twitter, marking her fourth concert residency. The show's set list was arranged by Carey, according to fans' demands on Twitter and polls. This set list differed from the one of her previous residency, #1 to Infinity, as it included lesser-known songs by the singer that did not reach number-one on the Billboard Hot 100. For shows in 2018, the set list consisted of eighteen songs, including duets with frequent collaborators Daniel Moore and Trey Lorenz, with the 2019 leg seeing slight changes to the set. During the residency, Carey completed two concert tours and another residency. She returned to Vegas in February 2020, with a new set list, featuring a "Car Ride" medley, consisting of eight songs, and new tracks from her fifteenth studio album, Caution.

== Set list ==
=== 2018 ===
The following set list is obtained from the July 5, 2018 concert.

Fly Away (Butterfly Reprise)" (intro)

Act I

1. "Honey"
2. "Shake It Off"
3. "Make It Happen"

"Make It Happen" / "Sweetheart" / "Say Somethin'" / "Loverboy" / "Dreamlover" (background singers interlude)

Act II

4. "Fantasy" (Bad Boy Fantasy)
5. "Always Be My Baby"
6. "Vision of Love"
7. "Emotions"

"Emotionless" (band introductions)

Act III

"Obsessed" (instrumental interlude)

8. "#Beautiful" (with Daniel Moore II)
9. "I'll Be There" (with Trey Lorenz)
10. "One Sweet Day" (with Daniel Moore II and Trey Lorenz)
11. "Can't Let Go"
12. "Can't Take That Away (Mariah's Theme)"
13. "My All"

Act IV

"I'll Be Lovin' U Long Time" (instrumental interlude)

14. "It's Like That" (contains elements of "Sucker M.C.'s" and "Here We Go" by Run-DMC)
15. "Love Hangover / Heartbreaker"
16. "Touch My Body"
17. "We Belong Together"
18. "Hero" (followed by "Butterfly Reprise" outro)

=== 2019 ===
The following set list is obtained from the February 13, 2019 concert.

Fly Away (Butterfly Reprise)" (intro)

Act I

1. "Honey"
2. "Shake It Off"
3. "Make It Happen"

"Make It Happen" / "Sweetheart" / "Say Somethin'" / "Loverboy" / "Dreamlover" (background singers interlude)

Act II

4. "Fantasy" (Bad Boy Fantasy)
5. "Always Be My Baby"
6. "Love Takes Time"
7. "Emotions" (followed by band introductions)

"Migrate" (dancer introductions)

Act III

8. "#Beautiful" (with Daniel Moore II)
9. "One Sweet Day" (with Daniel Moore II and Trey Lorenz)
10. "Can't Let Go"
11. "With You"
12. "My All"

Act IV

"I'll Be Lovin' U Long Time" (instrumental interlude)

13. "It's Like That" (contains elements of "Sucker M.C.'s" and "Here We Go" by Run-DMC)
14. "Love Hangover / Heartbreaker"
15. "Touch My Body"
16. "We Belong Together"
17. "Hero" (followed by "Butterfly Reprise" outro)

=== 2020 ===
The following set list is obtained from the February 15, 2020 concert.

Fly Away (Butterfly Reprise)" (intro)

Act I

1. "Emotions"
2. "Shake It Off"
3. "Make It Happen"

"Make It Happen" / "Sweetheart" / "Loverboy" / "Dreamlover" (background singers interlude)

Act II

4. "Fantasy" (Bad Boy Fantasy)
5. "Obsessed"
6. "Love Takes Time"
7. "Always Be My Baby"

"Always Be My Baby" (Mr. Dupri Mix) (band introductions)

Act III

"Migrate" (dancer introductions)

8. "#Beautiful" (with Daniel Moore II)
9. "I'll Be There" (with Trey Lorenz)
10. "Endless Love" (with Trey Lorenz)
11. "My All"

Act IV

"I'll Be Lovin' U Long Time" (instrumental interlude)

12. "It's Like That" (contains elements of "Sucker M.C.'s" and "Here We Go" by Run-DMC)
13. Car Ride Medley:
  1. "A No No"
  2. "Honey"
  3. "I'm That Chick"
  4. "Heartbreaker"
  5. "Crybaby"
  6. "Breakdown"
  7. "Say Somethin'"
  8. "I Know What You Want"
14. "Touch My Body"
15. "We Belong Together" (followed by remix outro)

Encore

16. "Hero" (with extended outro)

=== Notes ===
- "I'll Be There" was only performed on July 5, 2018 and from February 14 to 19, 2020.
- On July 10, 2018, "Close My Eyes" and "I Still Believe" were performed; the latter replacing "Can't Take That Away (Mariah's Theme)".
- Aside from its inclusion to the set list in 2019 and 2020, "Love Takes Time" was performed on July 14 and September 2, 2018.
- Starting on July 15, 2018, "Can't Take That Away (Mariah's Theme)" was cut from the set list.
- "Crybaby" was performed from August 31 and September 1 and 5, 2018. It was eventually added to the 2020 set list.
- "Fly Like a Bird" was only performed on September 9 and 10, 2018, and February 13, 2019.
- Carey performed a snippet of "Outside" on September 10, 2018.
- On February 15 and 21, 2019, "I Don't Wanna Cry" replaced "Fly Like a Bird".
- "Can't Let Go" was performed on February 16 and 19, 2019, and February 19 and 21, 2020.
- "Vision of Love" was performed on February 14, 2020, but was ultimately replaced by "Love Takes Time".
- Starting on February 19, 2020, "Endless Love" was cut from the set list.
- "Slipping Away" replaced "Vision of Love" during the show on February 26, 2020.
- On February 28, 2020, "Melt Away" replaced "Love Takes Time".
- "Everything Fades Away" was performed during the final night on February 29, 2020, replacing "Love Takes Time".

== Shows ==
Date	Attendance	Revenue
Leg 1
July 5, 2018	—	—
July 7, 2018	—	—
July 8, 2018	—	—
July 10, 2018	—	—
July 14, 2018	—	—
July 15, 2018	—	—
Leg 2
August 31, 2018	—	—
September 1, 2018	—	—
September 2, 2018	—	—
September 5, 2018	—	—
September 9, 2018	—	—
September 10, 2018	—	—
Leg 3
February 13, 2019	—	—
February 15, 2019	—	—
February 16, 2019	—	—
February 19, 2019	—	—
February 21, 2019	—	—
Leg 4
February 14, 2020	—	—
February 15, 2020	—	—
February 19, 2020	—	—
February 21, 2020	—	—
February 22, 2020	—	—
February 26, 2020	—	—
February 28, 2020	—	—
February 29, 2020	—	—
Total		
