= I Stay in Love =

Single by Mariah Carey

from the album E=MC²
- Released: October 28, 2008
- Recorded: 2007
- Studio: Stone Groove Studios, Lake County, Illinois
- Genre: R&B
- Length: 3:31
- Label: Island
- Songwriters: Mariah Carey; Bryan-Michael Cox; Adonis Shropshire; Kendrick Dean
- Producers: Mariah Carey; Bryan-Michael Cox

Mariah Carey singles chronology
"Right to Dream" (2008)	"I Stay in Love" (2008)	"My Love" (2009)

Music video
- "I Stay in Love" on YouTube

"I Stay in Love" is a song by American singer-songwriter Mariah Carey, taken from her eleventh studio album, E=MC² (2008). It was written by Carey, Bryan-Michael Cox, Adonis Shropshire and Kendrick Dean, and produced by the former two. "I Stay in Love" was released through Island Records on October 28, 2008, as the fourth and final single from the album. Drawing influence from the R&B and soul music genre, the song features a piano and keyboard-driven melody, and a strong accompanying drum-beat. Lyrically, the song finds Carey getting "her cry on with the connect-the-dots break-up track." She describes the old time she shared with her love interest. She narrates that even though they said let go, and that she is aware that there is nothing left in their relationship, she still "stays in love with him".

"I Stay in Love" received generally positive reviews from music critics, with many considering the song a strong ballad and a highlight from the album, while complimenting its production and piano-driven melody, despite criticizing the similarities to Carey's previous single, "We Belong Together" (2005). The song performed weak commercially, becoming Carey's first single from the album not to chart on the US Billboard Hot 100, although it peaked at number 81 on the Hot R&B/Hip-Hop Songs chart, and became Carey's 14th number one on the Hot Dance Club Play chart. In the United Kingdom, the song debuted and peaked at number 95, and spent only one week on the UK Singles Chart.

Carey performed "I Stay in Love" live on two high-profile televised events. First, on November 8, 2008, she was featured as a guest judge and musical performer of the fifth season of the popular British talent competition, The X Factor. Additionally, Carey performed it live at the American Music Awards, held on November 23, 2008. The song's accompanying music video was filmed by Carey's husband, Nick Cannon, and features Carey as a dancer in a Las Vegas show at the Bellagio Hotel and Casino Resort. Additionally, during the show and its preparations, Carey realizes that her ex-lover has found love with one of her fellow dancers, leading her to blow up the car he gave her, as well as its accompaniments in the Mojave Desert.

== Background and composition ==
"I Stay in Love" was written and produced by Mariah Carey and Bryan-Michael Cox, with additional songwriting from Adonis Shropshire and Kendrick Dean, for Carey's eleventh studio album, E=MC² (2008). In an interview with Ed Lover for the radio station Power 105 in New York City, Carey revealed that the song was one of her favorites from the album and that she recorded her vocals within a day. Following the commercial underperformance of the album's third single, "I'll Be Lovin' U Long Time", "I Stay in Love" was released as the fourth single from E=MC². In the United States, it was serviced to mainstream, rhythmic and urban radio stations on October 28, 2008. A four-track EP consisting of remixes by Jody den Broeder and Ralphi Rosario was released in the United States on December 16, 2008.

"I Stay in Love" is a "beat-driven" and "piano-laced" ballad, that is influenced by pop and R&B music genres. The song's instrumentation is derived from a piano melody, and is backed by a strong computerized drum-beat. It is composed in the key of D♭ major, with Carey's vocals spanning from the low note of D♭_{3} to the high note of G♭_{5}. The song moves at a slow tempo of 65 beats per minute in cut time, and it follows a chord progression of D♭–B♭m7–G♭–A♭. The song features a "double voice" effect during its final chorus, where Carey's normal singing tone throughout the rest of the song is combined with her raised pitch. She raises the pitch one octave, and layers it over her normal tone. Lyrically, the song finds Carey getting "her cry on with the connect-the-dots break-up track." She describes the old time she shared with her lover. She also admits that even though they did attempt to save their relationship, and that she knows that it is definitely over, she still "stays in love with him".

On the United States' Billboard Dance Club Songs chart, "I Stay in Love" became Carey's fourteenth number-one song on February 14, 2009. The track peaked at thirty-seven on the Rhythmic chart, number eighty-one on the Hot R&B/Hip-Hop Songs chart, and number ninety-five on the Pop 100 chart. The track reached number ninety-five on the UK Singles Chart.

== Critical reception ==
"I Stay in Love" garnered generally positive reviews from music critics. Many complimented the song's piano-driven melody, as well as Carey's vocals, while some felt it was too similar to her previous single, "We Belong Together" (2005). In his review of E=MC², Kevin O'Hare of The Republican wrote that Carey "shines" on the song, while Fox News' Roger Friedman described it as "a killer ballad." People's Chuck Arnold named it the best ballad on the album, calling it "pretty". The Houston Chronicle's writer Joey Guerra described the single as a "gently grooving ballad that Janet Jackson should be recording instead of wasting her time on tired sex clichés", while commenting, "It's doubtful, however, that Jackson could reach the notes Carey effortlessly hits at the end of the song". Richard Cromelin from the Los Angeles Times highlighted Carey's raw form of singing on the track, writing, "its unadorned, and her voice is almost leathery in the lower notes. It's not flattering, but it rings true emotionally." Nick Levine of Digital Spy called "I Stay in Love" a "fairly modern Mariah track" and that although he believed it was a "retread" of one of Carey's previous singles "We Belong Together" (2005), it is not an "unpleasant retread".

Michael Slezak from Entertainment Weekly wrote that the song is "a slower, less addictive variation" of "We Belong Together". Newsday critic, Glenn Gamboa, also called it a "We Belong Together-sh ballad". In separate reviews of the song, both David Balls and Nick Levine of Digital Spy also compared the song to Carey's "We Belong Together"; the former rated "I Stay in Love" three out of five stars, and wrote, "It may not be the most original of songs, but Carey's emotion-packed vocals make this a pleasant treat after some vacuous recent offerings." Freedom De Luc from The Washington Post described the song as an "emotive ballad", while Nekesa Mumbi Moody from Foster's Daily Democrat noted "it could have been recorded in her early '90s heyday — except it's not as saccharine as some of her early work". However, Evan Sawdey of PopMatters described it as one of the album's "worst songs".

== Music video ==
=== Background ===
Directed by Carey's then-husband Nick Cannon, the music video for "I Stay in Love" was filmed in Las Vegas, Nevada, using a story line that Cannon and Carey co-wrote. Carey filmed at the Bellagio Hotel and Casino Resort on October 5, 2008 and in the Mojave Desert on October 6. In an interview with Ryan Seacrest, Cannon said that Carey was "very easy to work with". Cannon further spoke about a scene where Carey is in bed with another man, played by Andrew Karelis, jokingly saying that: "It was one of those situations where I wasn't intimidated but I could've knocked him out at any point." The music video for "I Stay In Love" was featured on BET's Access Granted for a behind-the-scenes look and a world premiere on October 27, 2008. The music video peaked at No. 16 on the Billboard Hot Videoclip Tracks chart.

=== Synopsis ===
In the image, Carey is seen dressed in white garments and large feathers. She is featured as a dancer in Las Vegas, and is where she discovers her ex-lover has moved on.

The video, black-and-white, begins with Carey parking her antique automobile in desert. She gets out, with customized black boots with an 'M' on them, and as, she walks towards the camera, the vehicle explodes. As the music begins and the scene shifts to another where Carey applying her eye make-up and earrings. As a form of product placement, her fragrance is shown on a dresser in her Boudoir. As Carey finishes getting ready, scenery of Las Vegas is shown, before shifting to Carey, now dressed as a Vegas performer. As she walks down a runway dressed in white garments ad feathers, she catches the attention of a man. He turns out to be Carey's ex-lover, who in turn came to the show to meet with one of Carey's fellow dancers. As he caresses the female in the dressing room, Carey sees them, and walks by them, bumping into him purposely. Additional scenes are shown of Carey laying alone on the dark runway, apparently after the show has finished, as well as preparing herself for the show. During the second verse, the video then shows Carey driving down a highway in the desert, and as she drives, past memories of the pair are shown, holding each other intimately in a bed. She then pushes old gifts he had given her into the passengers seat, and pulls over the car, continuing the scene from the beginning of the video. After the car explodes, Carey tears off her necklace in despair, and begins to flail her arms in desperation. The video ends with Carey back at the show in Vegas during the finale, as glitter drops from the top of the stage. Carey, now back in the desert, looks for another ride, and gets into a black Cadillac Escalade driven by Nick Cannon.

=== Reception and Luscious Pink commercial ===
Nick Levine from Digital Spy complimented the video, commenting that it managed "to be both ridiculous and a little bit moving – quite an achievement." Entertainment Weekly writer Michael Slezak described Carey's boots as "hot", and considered the cinematography of the music video "gorgeous". He also complimented several aspects of the video, saying, "Mariah’s bod looks totally smokin’, even if her entire wardrobe should be donated to a charity benefiting teenage strumpets and/or truck-stop hookers. Also: That Wentworth Miller 2.0 ain’t hard on the eyes, either (in reference to the man who played her love interest in "We Belong Together").

The commercial for Carey's Luscious Pink fragrance uses part of the "I Stay in Love" music video, with a clip of the song used as audio. The short clip shows Carey getting ready for the Vegas show, by applying her make-up and lipstick, and also applying the fragrance on her neck and cleavage. The release published on Carey's official website described the concept of the commercial as "a combination of Mariah's two passions – music and fragrance."

== Live performances ==
Due to promotion for E=MC² and the single, Carey was featured as a guest judge and musical act on the fifth series of the popular British talent competition, The X Factor. During that week, all the contestants would have to sing songs from Carey's catalog. Prior to her arrival, one of the show's judges Dannii Minogue said "Could it get any more nerve-wracking for the contestants?", due to the general strenuous nature of Carey's songs. Before any of the performances by the finalists, Carey performed "I Stay in Love", accompanied by three background vocalists. She received a standing ovation from the audience and judges, and continued backstage for a taped session with the contestants. At the end of the program, she performed her classic "Hero" (1993), and was eventually joined by the finalists for the finale of the song. "Hero" was re-recorded by the 2008 UK X Factor finalists and released as a single, becoming the second best-selling single of 2008 in the United Kingdom. According to reports, the episode gained a large increase in viewers due to Carey's presence, and was able to surpass its long-time rival program, Strictly Come Dancing, in the ratings. Carey also made an appearance at the American Music Awards of 2008 on November 23, at the Nokia Theatre. Wearing a long black gown, she performed the song after receiving an honorary award for her achievements in music. Chris Harris from MTV News described it as a "riveting performance".

== Formats ==
Remix EP

1. "I Stay in Love" (Jody den Broeder Radio Edit) – 4:08
2. "I Stay in Love" (Ralph Rosario Melodic Radio Edit) – 3:50
3. "I Stay in Love" (Jody den Broeder House Mix) – 8:29
4. "I Stay in Love" (Ralph Rosario Big Vocal) – 8:12

I Stay in Love – EP

1. "I Stay in Love" (Jody den Broeder House Mix) – 8:29
2. "I Stay in Love" (Jody den Broeder Radio Mix) – 4:08
3. "I Stay in Love" (Jody den Broeder Dub) – 7:32
4. "I Stay in Love" (Ralphi Rosario's Big Vocal Mix) – 8:12
5. "I Stay In Love" (Ralphi Rosario's Melodic Club Vox Mix) - 9:28
6. "I Stay in Love" (Ralphi Rosario's Melodic Radio Edit) – 3:50
7. "I Stay in Love" (Ralphi Rosario's Bar Dub Mix) – 8:15

== Charts ==
=== Weekly charts ===
Chart (2008–09)	Peak position
Global Dance Songs (Billboard)	21
UK Singles (Official Charts)	95
US Dance Club Songs (Billboard)	1
US Dance Singles Sales (Billboard)	2
US Pop 100 (Billboard)	95
US Hot R&B/Hip-Hop Songs (Billboard)	81
US Rhythmic Airplay (Billboard)	37

=== Year-end charts ===
Chart (2009)	Position
US Dance Club Songs (Billboard)	48

== Release history ==
Release dates and formats for "I Stay in Love"
Region	Date	Format	Label(s)	Ref.
United States	October 28, 2008	Mainstream airplay	Island	
United Kingdom	December 22, 2008		Island	

== See also ==
- List of number-one dance singles of 2009 (U.S.)
- Artists with the most number-ones on the U.S. dance chart
