= E=MC² (Mariah Carey album) =

Studio album by Mariah Carey
- Released: April 11, 2008
- Recorded: 2007–2008
- Studios: Roc the Mic Studios (New York, NY); Honeysouth Studios (North Miami, FL); Circle House Studios (North Miami, FL); Legacy Recording Studios (New York, NY); Triangle Sound Studios (Atlanta, GA); Southside Studios (Atlanta, GA); Stone Groove Studios (Lake County, Illinois); Soundtrap (Atlanta, GA); Exclusivity Studios (Anguilla)
- Genres: R&B; pop; hip hop
- Length: 52:14
- Labels: Island Def Jam; Island; Def Jam
- Producers: Mariah Carey; Bryan-Michael Cox; Nathaniel "Danja" Hills; DJ Toomp; Jermaine Dupri; James Poyser; Kaseem "Swizz Beats" Dean; Terius "The-Dream" Nash; Christopher "Tricky" Stewart; Scott Storch; Stargate; Will "will.i.am" Adams

Mariah Carey chronology
The Emancipation of Mimi (2005)	E=MC² (2008)	The Ballads (2008)

Singles from E=MC²
- 1. "Touch My Body" Released: February 12, 2008; 2. "Bye Bye" Released: April 15, 2008; 3. "I'll Be Lovin' U Long Time" Released: July 1, 2008; 4. "I Stay in Love" Released: October 28, 2008

E=MC² is the eleventh studio album by American singer-songwriter Mariah Carey, released on April 11, 2008, by Island Records, Def Jam Recordings and the Island Def Jam Music Group. The singer began recording the album in 2007 in Anguilla, after writing and composing most of its material during and after her 2006 Adventures of Mimi Tour. Carey worked with various songwriters and producers on the project, including Jermaine Dupri, Bryan-Michael Cox, Stargate, The-Dream, Tricky Stewart, Scott Storch and Danja.

The album revealed a more personal side of the singer, illustrated in its declarative theme of emancipation from her previous marriage, and from her personal and professional setbacks. It was meant to be a continuation, or a second part of her tenth studio album, The Emancipation of Mimi (2005). Although it shared similar vocal production as well as an inclination to her signature pop and R&B ballads, the album also encompassed a variety of dance-oriented and uptempo styles. Carey collaborated with a number of artists on the album, including T-Pain, Damian Marley and Young Jeezy. Though considered by critics very similar to the formula its predecessor had been built on, E=MC² included other genres she had never explored, such as reggae, and her continued recording of gospel-influenced hymns.

E=MC² was generally well received by music critics, with many complimenting the record's broad genre influences, and musical and production styles. Some critics, however, felt that the album was too similar to The Emancipation of Mimi. The album debuted at number one on the US Billboard 200 with opening week sales of 463,000 copies; the highest first-week sales of Carey's career. It also debuted at number one in Canada, and opened inside the top-five in Australia, Switzerland and the United Kingdom.

Four singles were released to promote the album. The album's lead single, "Touch My Body", became Carey's eighteenth chart-topper on the Billboard Hot 100, tying her with Elvis Presley as the solo artist with the most number one singles in United States history, a record she has since surpassed. Additionally, it gave Carey her 79th week atop the chart, tying Presley for most weeks at number one. It achieved strong worldwide charting, peaking within the top five of the singles charts in Italy, Japan, New Zealand, Switzerland and the United Kingdom. "Bye Bye" served as the album's second release. Although hailed by critics, and expected to have achieved large commercial success, the song stalled at number nineteen on the Hot 100, and managed to chart weakly internationally. The third single, "I'll Be Lovin' U Long Time" failed to garner major success in any prominent music market. The fourth and final single "I Stay in Love" became her fourteenth chart topper on the Dance Club Songs chart.

== Background and recording ==
In 2002, Mariah Carey signed a new record deal with Island Records and in 2005 she released her tenth studio album, The Emancipation of Mimi. It became the best-selling album of 2005 in the United States, and the second best-seller around the world, with over 12 million units sold. It earned a myriad of music industry awards, and brought Carey back to the top of pop music following her commercial decline in 2001. After completing The Adventures of Mimi Tour, she began working on material for her eleventh studio effort, the yet untitled E=MC². E=MC² was hailed as one of the most anticipated albums of 2008, with many critics weighing their opinions on whether Carey would be able to deliver significant success, following her achievements with The Emancipation of Mimi. Throughout 2007, Carey recorded the album in a studio built into her private villa in Anguilla, in the Caribbean. She described E=MC² as one of her most expressive albums, and one that she felt free on, and able to express herself through her music. In an interview with The Bryan Times, Carey spoke of her sentiments on the album "It's hard for me to sit here and talk about it without sounding like if I'm bragging if I'm in love with it, but I am I love with this album. I think that having the success with the last record allowed me to have more freedom...and just make records that I like. It's kind of a really fun record".

== Delays and release ==
The album was supposed to be released in late 2007, but Carey spoke about reason the album got delayed: "You can't really put records out in December if you want the whole world to have a chance to actually hear it, [and] my fans all over the world are very important to me", adding that she also wants to put out a pair of singles before the album drops. In a separate interview, she elaborated further: "This happened to me with The Emancipation of Mimi, I started writing more songs, I was like okay let me get these done, then I wrote four more songs and you know how it goes, so now I'm like 22 songs in and clearly I have to cut some of those down". It was then reported that the album will be released in February 2008. However, the release was later pushed back yet again to April 2008.

Prior to its release, the album's working title had been That Chick, which was also the working title of a song on the album that would eventually be titled, "I'm That Chick". As the release date drew near, the title was changed to E=MC², in reference to Carey's previous album, The Emancipation of Mimi (2005). The title signifies "(E) Emancipation (=) of (MC) Mariah Carey (²) to the second power". It is a word play on Albert Einstein's famous mass–energy equivalence formula and has been dubbed as the sequel and improved counterpart to The Emancipation of Mimi. In his review of the album, Alex Macpherson from The Guardian described his thoughts on its title, as well as its meaning:

It is worth pondering what the title of Mariah Carey's eleventh studio album could refer to. Emancipation, maybe, in a nod to her 2005 comeback album, The Emancipation of Mimi; or perhaps the energy of the original equation, a statement that Carey still has what it takes to party all night at the age of 37, even as she describes herself as "eternally 12". Then again, she could just be identifying herself alongside Einstein as a fellow genius. Either way, 'E=MC²' finds Carey loopier than ever, embracing her own larger-than-life image with gusto: Mariah Carey Squared indeed.

Carey expressed how she considered Mimi the "main course", and felt that the new album would be treated as "dessert". In an interview with NME, the singer described her choice on the album's title: "Basically, I'm freer on this album than I've ever been. Some of the songs on the last album were cool but maybe not quite as neat as this album." When questioned if the title represented Carey's interest in physics, she jokingly added "Einstein's theory? Physics? Me? Hello! I even failed remedial math. I could not pass seventh grade math even in the lowest class with the worst kids." The album's similarity to its predecessor is not only found in the title and music, but also in its artwork. In the album's cover art, she holds almost the exact pose as from her last album, only with different lighting and wardrobe. It features a black backdrop, with Carey completely naked, except for a large feathered shawl covering her body. Only her first name appears in large pink letters on the cover, with 'E=MC²' appearing in small white letters on the top. In describing the cover, Macpherson wrote "Carey is naked but for the world's largest feather boa, an accessory for which flocks of birds have surely given their lives."

== Composition ==
=== Style and structure ===
Music critics compared E=MC² heavily to Carey's previous album, The Emancipation of Mimi, and felt it followed the same formula of ballads and dance-able tracks. Freedom De Luc of The Washington Post felt that after experiencing strong success for the first time in the 2000s with Mimi, Carey tried to create E=MC² with the same formula, although possibly a little improved: "Having found that winning formula of coquettish club bangers, emotional ballads and frisky, mid-tempo coos, the diva with the golden tone has eschewed radical experimentalism here for stasis. 'E=MC²' is mostly more of the same, then, with the '2' representing something sequential rather than exponential. Meet the new Mariah, almost exactly the same as the old ... 'Mimi'!"

=== Songs and lyrics ===
The first song on the album's track list is "Migrate", a song Carey wrote and co-produced alongside Danja, and features a rap verse from T-Pain. The song features the inclusion of Auto-Tune and several vocal manipulators, which are used heavily on both Carey and T-Pain's vocals. Lyrically, the song finds the singer during a night out, migrating from several locations: from the car to the club, from the bar to the V.I.P, from the party to the after-party, and finally to the hotel. According to Brian Hiatt from VH1, she "hops from my car into the club ... from the bar to VIP ... from the party to the after-party ... afterparty to hotel" with T-Pain, who urges her to "bounce, bounce, bounce."

The album's lead single, "Touch My Body", was written and produced by Carey, Tricky Stewart and Terius "The Dream" Nash. The song's hook is built around a piano melody and "circular keyboard line", and features "a stuttering mid-tempo beat that's accented by finger snaps and electronic synthesizers" as its instrumentation. Lyrically, the song describes the protagonist revealing several bedroom fantasies in which she would like to engage in, asking her lover playfully to "touch her body". According to Ben Ratliff from The New York Times, it's a "questionably sexy striptease: a goofy-sleazy tryst vignette", with Carey singing "If there's a camera up in here then I best not catch this flick on YouTube."

"Cruise Control", featuring reggae artist Damian Marley, is influenced by R&B and reggae, and finds her adapting to the genre by imitating Jamaican phrases, accents and styles of singing. "I Stay in Love" was released as the fourth and final single from the album. Written by Carey and Bryan-Michael Cox, is a mid-tempo "beat-driven" and "piano-laced" ballad, that is influenced by pop and R&B music genres. The song's instrumentation is derived from a piano melody, and is backed by a strong computerized drum-beat. Its lyrics find Carey as her most vulnerable; she describes old times she shared with her lover, and that even though "we said let go", and "inside she knows it's over", she still "stays in love with him". Featuring American rapper Young Jeezy, "Side Effects" describes Carey's abusive relationship with Tommy Mottola, her ex-husband. During the first verse, she discusses the pair's background, and how she was young and naive, and believed everything he preached to her. The lyrics read "Keepin' me there, under your thumb / Cause you were scared that I'd become much / More than you could handle," she confesses, and refers to herself as "Shining like a chandelier / That decorated every room inside / The private hell we built / And I dealt with it / Like a kid I wished / I could fly away." Sarah Rodman from The Boston Globe described it as "another look at her fractious marriage to Mottola", and wrote "Although the union ended in 1998, Carey is still suffering, including dreams of the 'violent times' and 'sleeping with the enemy'. Interestingly, her vocal approach here is almost emo, as she hits her rock-solid middle register and refuses to be held captive by the demons of her past." MTV News writer Jennifer Vineyard described the song in detail:

[It] finally reveals a side of Mariah we don't see that often — her true self. The Mariah we usually see and hear is a glossy one. Psychologists might say her affect is 'off' — meaning her gestures and facial expressions don't match her mood. There's a reason for that, as she explains on 'Side Effects', which is the emotional abuse she says she suffered during her marriage to music mogul Tommy Mottola. Mariah, who is usually quite guarded, has alluded to the subject in songs like 'Petals', but never has she gone into such detail as she does on 'Side Effects', in which she refers to the marriage as a 'private hell that we built'. Even though it's been 11 years since they split up, she sings in a lower register that she's still 'wakin' up scared some nights ... dreaming about the violent times'. Her emotional scars left her 'a little protective ... a little defensive ... a little depressed', which makes her 'fake a smile' as she 'deal[s] with the side effects'. Even though it features Young Jeezy, it sounds like a rock power ballad.

"I'm That Chick" is a song Carey wrote alongside Norwegian duo, Stargate. It is a fast-paced song, which features a "care-free feel", and is influenced by soul, pop and disco music genres. The song incorporates a sample from Michael Jackson's "Off the Wall", and features a strong thumping bass-line and hand claps. Evan Sawdey of PopMatters described it as a "late-night disco-bass groove", and highlighted its production as the album's finest. "I'll Be Lovin' U Long Time", the album's eventual third single, was written and produced by Carey and DJ Toomp. The song was described as a "mid-tempo", "party jam", that is influenced by pop, R&B and soul genres. Critics elaborated on the song's "soul" influence, with Melissa Ruggieri from The News & Advance describing it as a "soul-thumper", while Digital Spy's Nick Levine called it a "nod towards classic soul". The song's title is derived from the popular line, "me love you long time", from the 1987 war film, Full Metal Jacket. Additionally, its hook and instrumentation is derived from sampling Mark DeBarge's Stay With Me. Critics also noted how "I'll Be Lovin' U Long Time" "recalls" the melody riff and chord progression of the Hill Street Blues's theme song. The song's main source of production comes from its "lush keyboard work", and her usage of the "double voice", which she uses throughout the song's bridge. Carey described the effect as "layering her voice", so that the bridge would sound like a "swooning bank of a hundred Mariahs".

"Bye Bye" served as the album's thirteenth track, and also composed by Carey and Stargate. It is influenced by R&B and pop music genres. The song is built on an understated and simple piano-driven melody, that is decorated with a soft bass-line. Lyrically, the song was described by critics as a "larger than life anthem", and an "inspirational lighter-in-the-air ballad", and finds Carey remembering both her father, as well as any lost loved ones. While the verses are dedicated to him, the chorus was written in a third-person point of view, for her fans: "This is for my peoples who just lost somebody / Your best friend, your baby, your man or your lady / Put your hand way up high / We will never say bye / Mamas, daddies, sisters, brothers, friends and cousins / This is for my peoples who lost their grandmothers / Lift your hands to the sky / Because we won't ever say bye bye". While listing several forms of loss, Carey encourages to never let go, and always live with their memory, and put their hands up if they ever lost someone, 'cause we won't ever say bye bye'. Serving as the album's closing number, "I Wish You Well" was compared to the closing number on Mimi, "Fly Like a Bird". Similarly, "I Wish You Well" incorporates gospel influence into its melody of "rousing piano waltz", that "extends forgiveness to those who have wronged her in the past and is pretty much interchangeable with its predecessors." Extensively making use of the whistle register, she references Mottola in another light than "Side Effects": "'I Wish You Well's' message to Mottola is similarly striking. Accompanied by a piano and some multi-tracked backing vocals, Carey sings: "Still bruised, still walk on eggshells / Same frightened child, hide to protect myself / But you can't manipulate me like before." She then prescribes Bible study and says, "I wish you well."

== Promotion ==
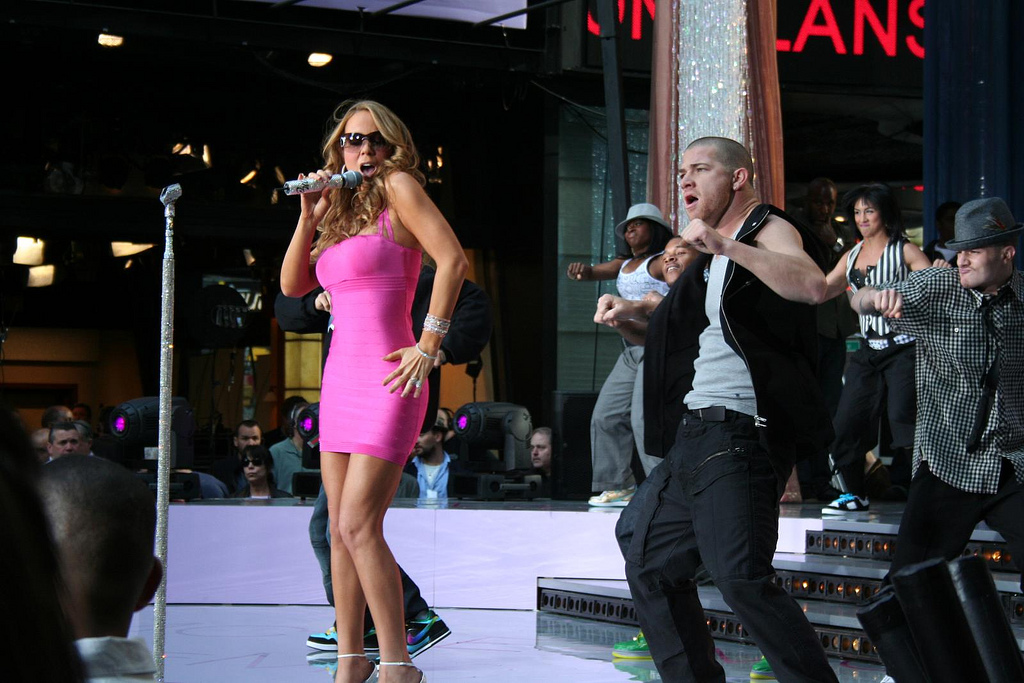
Carey and her dancers performing "Touch My Body" on Good Morning America on April 25, 2008

Carey performed on the March 15, 2008 episode of Saturday Night Live, hosted by Jonah Hill, replacing Janet Jackson who caught the flu and was unable to perform. She performed "Touch My Body" and "Migrate", this one alongside T-Pain. Ten days later, she was featured as the special guest performer at The Hills season premiere party, an event marking the start of a span of ten episodes airing in between season three and four, performing "Touch My Body", "I'm That Chick" and "We Belong Together". On April 12, 2008, Carey made an appearance on The Oprah Winfrey Show, where she was interviewed and performed a live rendition of "Bye Bye" for the audience, with three background vocalists assisting her. Kevin Johnson from St. Louis Post-Dispatch described the performance as "touching", and complimented the song's appeal.

On the seventh season of American Idol, Carey was featured as a mentor for the top-seven week. Titled "Mariah Carey Week" and airing live on April 14, 2008, the contestants were to perform a song from the singer's catalog. After all seven contestants sang their individual songs, they all came together for a live rendition of Carey's 1996 collaboration with Boyz II Men, "One Sweet Day". Following their joint performance, Carey emerged onto the stage and performed "Bye Bye" live, while backed by a trio of supporting vocalists. Tamara Jones of The Washington Post jokingly commented on Carey's flailing hand movements during the performance, writing how she was "waving like a malevolent homecoming queen". Gil Kaufman from MTV News complimented Carey's performance, commenting on her "barely there micro-dress" and writing how she "serenaded the audience with her homage to lost ones." On April 25, 2008, Carey opened the Good Morning America "Summer Concert Series" with a live performance in Times Square. She began the set with "Touch My Body" in front of thousands of fans. During the song, her backing vocals began to malfunction, causing it to repeat phrases and play during her main vocal moments. In order to let the sound engineer know of the problem, she substituted part of the lyrics for "stop singing my part now baby", and completed the final chorus. She continued on with "I'm That Chick", and completed the three-song set-list with her follow-up single, "Bye Bye".

After marking the album's stateside launch with her appearance on Good Morning America, Carey took to Europe to perform on several programs. In England, she performed "Touch My Body" on both The Sunday Night Project and The Paul O'Grady Show, travelling to Germany where she performed the song on the talent show Deutschland sucht den Superstar. On August 8, 2008, Carey performed on the Teen Choice Awards a mash-up consisting of "I'll Be Lovin' U Long Time", "Touch My Body" and "Bye Bye". At the Fashion Rocks ceremony in 2009, she performed "Touch My Body" and her then-current single "Obsessed", as well as the remix to her 1995 song "Fantasy". During the set-list, Carey was accompanied by six men in black ties, who hoisted her into the air in front of over 6,000 people during "Obsessed", and rigorous dance routines throughout "Touch My Body".

Similarly to American Idol, Carey was featured as a guest judge and musical act on the fifth season of the British talent competition, The X Factor. During that week, all the contestants would have to sing songs from her catalog. After several performances by the finalists, Carey performed "I Stay in Love", accompanied by three background vocalists and, at the end of the program, she performed "Hero" (1993), being joined by the finalists for the finale of the song. "Hero" was re-recorded by the 2008 UK X Factor finalists and released as a single, which became the best-selling single of the year in the region. According to reports, the episode gained a large increase in viewers due to Carey's presence, and was able to surpass its long-time rival program, Strictly Come Dancing, in the ratings. Carey made an appearance at the 2008 American Music Awards, held on November 23, 2008, at the Nokia Theatre. Wearing a long black gown, she performed "I Stay in Love" after receiving an honorary award for her achievements in music. Chris Harris from MTV News described it as a "riveting performance".

=== Singles ===
"Touch My Body" was released as the lead single from the album on February 12, 2008. The song received generally positive reviews from music critics, who complimented its hook and production, as well as its playful lyrics. "Touch My Body" became Carey's eighteenth number-one on the Billboard Hot 100 and made her the solo artist with the most number one singles in United States history, surpassing the record held by Elvis Presley. Additionally, it gave Carey her 79th week atop the Hot 100, tying her with Presley as the artist with the most weeks at number one in the Billboard chart history. Its tally of 286,000 digital downloads also helped it to break the record for best-selling digital song in a week at the time, surpassing Rihanna's "Umbrella" (2007), which sold 277,000 units. Internationally, the song peaked within the top five on the charts in Italy, Japan, New Zealand, Switzerland and the United Kingdom. Its music video, directed by film-maker Brett Ratner, follows around a story revolving around a computer employees fantasy as he visits Carey's home. As he fixes her computer, he enters a fantasy in which the pair perform several activities together, all while showing off Carey's figure in several revealing outfits.

"Bye Bye" was announced as the second single from the album on April 15, 2008. Despite being heavily speculated to have become her 19th number-one single on the Billboard Hot 100, it only managed to reach a peak position of number nineteen on the Billboard Hot 100. Throughout other countries where it found release, the song peaked within the top ten in New Zealand, and in the top-fifty in Canada, Ireland, Slovakia, and the United Kingdom. The song's accompanying music video was directed by Justin Francis on the island of Antigua in the Caribbean. It features behind-the-scenes footage of the couple, Carey promoting the album in the United Kingdom, as well as photos of several of Carey's close friends, family and past collaborators such as Luciano Pavarotti and Luther Vandross. Notably, Carey and Cannon began dating during their trip to the island, and later wed on April 30, 2008.

The album's third single, "I'll Be Lovin' U Long Time", was released on June 1, 2008. In the United States, the song peaked at number fifty-eight, and at number twenty-seven in Japan. On the UK Singles Chart, "I'll Be Lovin' U Long Time" peaked at number eighty-four, and spent only one week in the chart. Its accompanying music video was shot over a three-day interval in Hawaii, and makes usage of the islands scenery, as well as shots of Carey in several bikinis, while swimming with a dolphin.

"I Stay in Love" was released as the fourth and final single from the album on October 28, 2008. The song failed to chart on the Hot 100, though became Carey's fourteenth chart topper on the Hot Dance Club Play. Additionally, it peaked at number ninety-five on the UK Singles Chart. The song's accompanying music video was filmed by Carey's then-husband, Nick Cannon, and features her as a dancer in a Las Vegas show at the Bellagio Hotel and Casino Resort. During the show and its preparations, Carey realizes that her ex-lover has found love with one of her fellow dancers, leading her to blow up the car he gave her, as well as its accompaniments in the Mojave Desert.

=== Canceled tour ===
Since the album's release in early April, Carey had said publicly that she planned on embarking on a large worldwide tour in support of E=MC². In an interview with Billboard on March 28, 2008, she explained "It's come up, and I'm probably going to do it, but I don't know exactly how we're going to do it or when. I'm thinking probably September. But I think it's important to tour with this album, because there are so many songs that I really want to sing live, that I really enjoy." Months later, in an interview with MTV News in July, she further addressed her plans of a tour: "We're looking at November right now. Please don't hold me accountable if it turns out to be December 5 or December 7 or January 18!" When asked to describe the tour's theme, Carey explained "I'm thinking elaborate. I like elaborate. We only do substantial. That's what my jeweler says. I haven't gotten the looks in mind just yet, but we're going to figure it out soon enough." Despite continued plans for a tour, and announcements made on The X Factor UK in November, the tour was suddenly cancelled by early December. Tabloids and critics began heavily speculating that Carey had become pregnant, and had abandoned plans for a tour as a result. Though Carey had eventually announced that she was pregnant with twins on November 28, 2010, over two years later, she admitted she had indeed been pregnant during that time period, and suffered a miscarriage. For that reason, she cancelled the tour, and lost the child only two months later.

== Critical reception ==
Professional ratings
Aggregate scores
Source	Rating
Metacritic	64/100
Review scores
Source	Rating
AllMusic	3/5 stars
Blender	4/5 stars
Entertainment Weekly	A−
The Guardian	4/5 stars
Houston Chronicle	3/4 stars
Los Angeles Times	2/4 stars
The Observer	4/5 stars
PopMatters	4/10
Rolling Stone	3/5 stars
Slant Magazine	3/5 stars

E=MC² received generally positive reviews from music critics. At review aggregator Metacritic, which assigns a normalized rating out of 100 to reviews from professional publications, the album received a weighted average score of 64 based on 19 reviews, indicating "generally favorable reviews".

Stephen Thomas Erlewine, senior editor of AllMusic, rated the album three out of five stars, and wrote "it's misleading to judge Mariah based on her new record of possessing the most number one singles, as she's not about longevity, she's about being permanently transient, a characteristic 'E=MC²' captures all too well." Billboard's Gary Trust felt that on the album, Carey was in "pristine form", stating, "She's proclaimed emancipation before, but Mariah Carey's never sounded as free as she does on her 10th album. Carey's made a pop album with equal parts levity and gravity." Writing for Entertainment Weekly, Margeaux Watson graded E=MC² an 'A−', and described how the album's goal was to prove "her comeback was no fluke". She continued complimenting the album's several collaborations, and wrote "the result is a largely enjoyable mix of flirtatious club jams, midtempo love songs, and emotional ballads anchored by hip-hop beats that handsomely showcase the singer's powerful vocal chops." Though Carey's voice had been criticized since her 2002 release, Charmbracelet, for not being able to deliver the "gravity defying vocals" from the 1990s, blogger Roger Friedman from Fox News wrote "Her infamous eight-octave range has suffered a little wear and tear over the years, but Carey still can flutter from great highs to mellow lows like no one else." Alex Macpherson from The Guardian gave the album four out of five stars, heavily describing the singer's vocal state throughout the album: "Carey's voice has been mocked, bizarrely, as being a triumph of technique over soul – an argument that fails to comprehend that technique and soul are intertwined, that technique primarily exists as a means to convey emotion – but she is on fine vocal form throughout 'E=MC²', whether belting out massive ballads, or layering her voice into a swooning bank of a hundred Mariahs." Macpherson concluded his review with, "When she sings elsewhere, "Them other regularities, they can't compare with MC," "it is hard not to agree", referencing a lyric on "For the Record".

The Houston Chronicle's Joey Guerra felt all of the album's tracks were strong, and wrote "Every track plays like a potential hit single, and that's exactly what fans will love about 'E=MC²'. Expect it to soundtrack much of the summer and beyond." Los Angeles Times staff writer, Richard Cromelin, gave the album two out of four stars, noting its "alternatives to the glass-shattering flamboyance of her early '90s youth." He concluded in his mixed review of the album, "Of course, consistency isn't so important when an album is assembled as a series of singles rather than a cohesive work. Fortunately for Carey, the tabloid-tailored real-life back story on one side and the producer's craft on the other matter more than the art of singing in this particular fairy tale." Ben Ratliff of The New York Times felt the album didn't level up to par with Carey's previous release, writing "Much of the record sounds like urban-radio imitations, without the peculiarities and effective hooks of 'Mimi'. Maybe emancipation isn't a continuing procedure; maybe it only comes once." Writing for PopMatters, Evan Sawdey rated E=MC² four out of ten discs, describing it as a "shallow imitation of its predecessor". Sawdey concluded his review on a mixed note, stating " the second act of Mariah's comeback doesn't wisely expand her sound: it instead succumbs to the blueprint so carefully laid out by its predecessor, a pointless remake that exists only because it has to. If you ever had a doubt as to its formulaic nature, you need to look no further than its title. Long live the Diva." Caryn Ganz from Rolling Stone questioned why she limited her vocal abilities throughout the record, "nearly every song confines Carey to four-note verses, offering little room for her glorious range." Journalist Eric Henderson, writing for Slant Magazine, graded the album three out of five stars, and concluding with, "Such are the rewards of an album like 'E=MC²', in which one does reach a solution, but not before Mariah bends over backward to show her work." The album finished in the top-ten of several "best of 2008" lists, ending at number four on an official poll held by Billboard, eight by The Detroit News, and number ten by The San Diego Union-Tribune. Robert Christgau picked out one song from the album, "Touch My Body", as a "choice cut".

=== Year-end lists ===
Publication	Accolade	Rank	Ref.
Pitchfork (Tom Ewing)	The 50 Best Albums of 2008	14	
Pitchfork (David Raposa)	The 50 Best Albums of 2008	21	

== Commercial performance ==
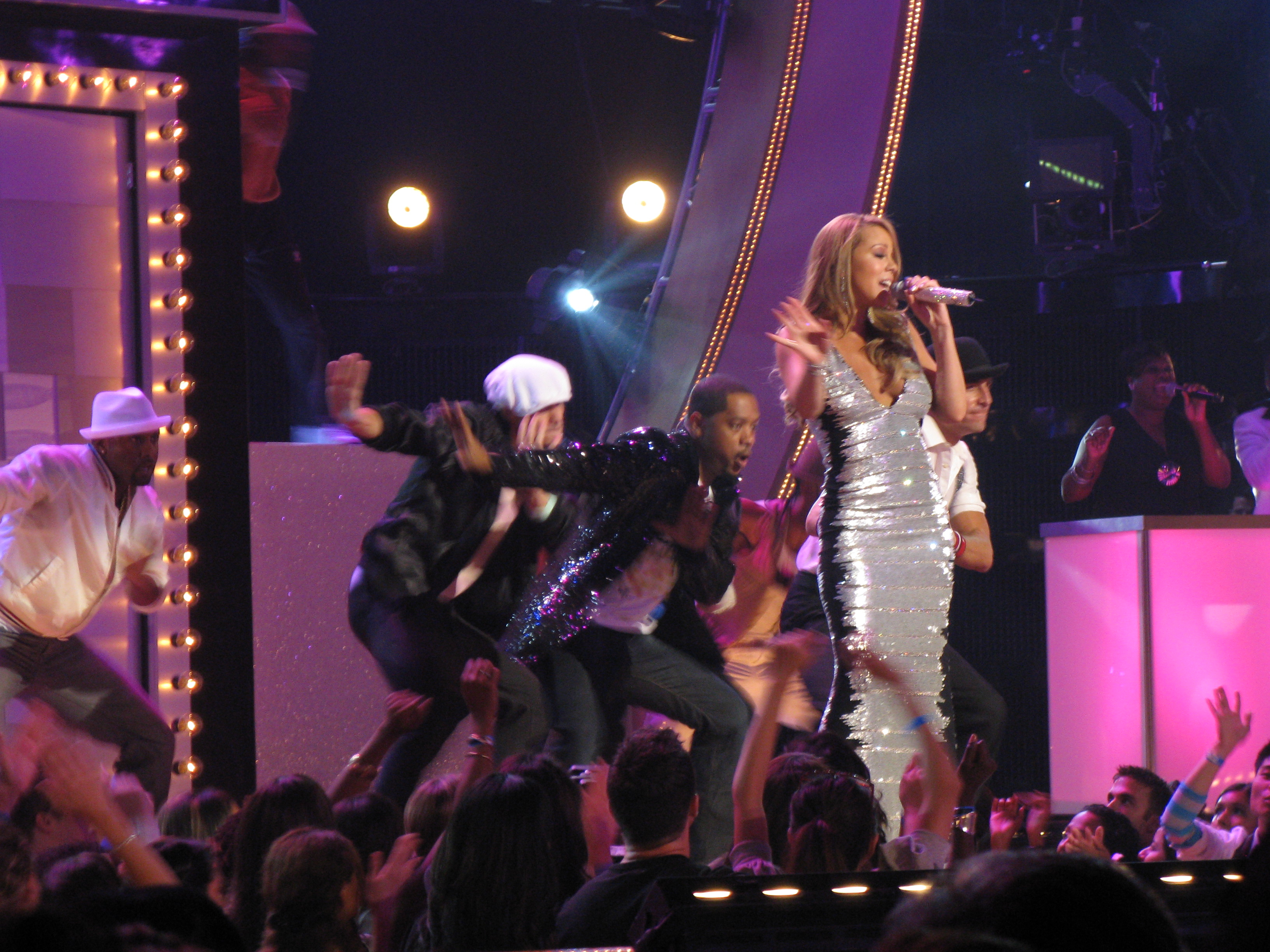
Carey opening the 2008 Fashion Rocks ceremony with a live performance of "I'm That Chick".

E=MC² debuted at number one on the Billboard 200 with 463,000 copies sold, making it the biggest opening week sales of Carey's career, and also the fourth biggest opening album in 2008 for a female artist, before matched by Beyoncé's I Am... Sasha Fierce, Britney Spears' Circus and Taylor Swift's Fearless in November. With six number one albums, Carey became tied with Spears and Beyoncé in the United States for the third most number one albums for a female artist, behind Janet Jackson with seven, Madonna with eight and Barbra Streisand's nine chart toppers. In its second week, the album remained at number one on the albums chart, with 182,000 copies sold. E=MC² became Carey's first album to spend two straight weeks at number one since 1995's Daydream, although The Emancipation of Mimi (2005) spent two non-consecutive weeks at the top spot. On Billboard's Top R&B/Hip-Hop Albums chart, E=MC² debuted at number one, and spent forty-seven weeks fluctuating within the top 100. The album was certified Platinum by the Recording Industry Association of America (RIAA) on July 8, 2008, denoting shipments of one million units. According to Nielsen SoundScan, stateside sales of the album stand at 1,289,000 copies as of April 2013. In total, E=MC² spent twenty-seven weeks within the Billboard 200, and finished at number twenty-two on the Year-End chart. On the same day the album was released, Mayor Antonio Villaraigosa proclaimed April 15 officially as "Mariah Carey day" in Los Angeles. It was in part of celebrating her eighteenth number one single, "Touch My Body". Also, from April 25 through April 27, 2008, the Empire State Building was lit up in Carey's motif colors—lavender, pink, and white — in celebration of her achievements in the world of music. On the Canadian Albums Chart, during the week dated May 3, 2008, E=MC² debuted at number one, with first-week sales of 19,000 copies. It became her first number one album in Canada since Butterfly, as Rainbow and The Emancipation of Mimi both opened at number two. The album spent seven weeks within the album's chart, and was eventually certified Platinum by the Canadian Recording Industry Association (CRIA), denoting shipments of 100,000 units.

E=MC² entered the Australian Albums Chart on April 5, 2008, at number two. The album spent eight weeks in the albums chart, and was certified Gold by the Australian Recording Industry Association (ARIA), denoting shipments of 35,000 units. In France, the album debuted at its peak position of number six during the week dated April 19, 2008. E=MC² spent twenty weeks on the albums chart, and ended its run on August 30, 2008. On the Dutch Albums Chart, it debuted at its peak position of number eleven on April 19, 2008. The album ended its eight-week chart run on June 7, 2008. During the week dated April 28, 2008, E=MC² debuted at number ten on the New Zealand Albums Chart, starting a ten-week run on the chart. The album peaked within the top ten in several European countries, such as number five in Switzerland, seven in Germany and Ireland, eight in Austria and number nine in Italy. On the UK Albums Chart, the album debuted at number three, selling 34,800 copies. This was her highest peak position in the United Kingdom since Butterfly (1997), which peaked at number two. After thirteen weeks on the chart, the album was certified Gold by the British Phonographic Industry (BPI), denoting shipments of 100,000 copies. In Japan, the album peaked at number seven on the Oricon Overall Chart, and was certified Gold by the Recording Industry Association of Japan (RIAJ) for shipments of 100,000 copies. After only eight days of release, E=MC² was certified Gold in the Philippines, denoting shipments of 15,000 units. The album was the 26th best-selling album worldwide in 2008, according to International Federation of the Phonographic Industry (IFPI). As of September 19, 2009, the album has sold 2.5 million copies worldwide.

In April 2020, the album had a resurgence in popularity. This led to it reaching number one on the iTunes albums charts in several countries including the United States, and top 10 in several countries worldwide.

== Track listing ==
E=MC² – Standard edition
No.	Title	Writer(s)	Producer(s)	Length
1.	"Migrate" (featuring T-Pain)	Mariah Carey; Nathaniel Hills; Balewa Muhammad; Faheem Najm	Carey; Danja	4:17
2.	"Touch My Body"	Carey; Crystal Johnson; Terius Nash; Christopher Stewart	Carey; Stewart; Nash	3:24
3.	"Cruise Control" (featuring Damian Marley)	Carey; Johnson; Jermaine Dupri; Damian Marley; Manuel Seal	Carey; Dupri; Seal (co)	3:32
4.	"I Stay in Love"	Carey; Bryan-Michael Cox; Adonis Shropshire; Kendrick Dean	Carey; Cox	3:32
5.	"Side Effects" (featuring Young Jeezy)	Carey; Jay Jenkins; Johnson; Scott Storch	Carey; Storch	4:22
6.	"I'm That Chick"	Carey; Johntá Austin; Mikkel S. Eriksen; Tor E. Hermansen; Rod Temperton	Carey; Stargate	3:31
7.	"Love Story"	Carey; Austin; Dupri; Seal	Carey; Dupri; Seal (co)	3:56
8.	"I'll Be Lovin' U Long Time"	Carey; Aldrin Davis; Johnson; Mark DeBarge; Etterlene Jordan	Carey; DJ Toomp	3:01
9.	"Last Kiss"	Carey; Austin; Dupri; Seal	Carey; Dupri; Seal (co)	3:36
10.	"Thanx 4 Nothin'"	Carey; Dupri; Seal	Carey; Dupri; Seal (co)	3:05
11.	"O.O.C."	Carey; Kasseem Dean; Shawntae Harris	Carey; Swizz Beatz	3:26
12.	"For the Record"	Carey; Cox; Shropshire	Carey; Cox	3:26
13.	"Bye Bye"	Carey; Austin; Eriksen; Hermansen	Carey; Stargate	4:27
14.	"I Wish You Well"	Carey; James Poyser; Mary Ann Tatum	Carey; Poyser	4:35
Total length:				52:14

E=MC² – International special digital edition (bonus track)
No.	Title	Writer(s)	Producer(s)	Length
15.	"Touch My Body" (Remix featuring Rick Ross and The-Dream)	Carey; Johnson; Nash; Stewart	Carey; Stewart; Mozartt; Sean Hall	4:22
Total length:				56:36

E=MC² – International edition (bonus track)
No.	Title	Writer(s)	Producer(s)	Length
15.	"Heat"	Carey; Johnson; William James Adams; Keith Harris; Jalil Hutchins; John Fletcher; Lawrence Smith; Randolph Muller	Carey; will.i.am	3:34
Total length:				55:48

E=MC² – United Kingdom digital Nokia edition (bonus track)
No.	Title	Writer(s)	Producer(s)	Length
16.	"Touch My Body" (Remix featuring Rick Ross and The-Dream)	Carey; Johnson; Nash; Stewart	Carey; Tricky	4:22
Total length:				60:10

E=MC² – French, Japanese editions and 2021 digital deluxe edition (bonus tracks)
No.	Title	Writer(s)	Producer(s)	Length
16.	"4real4real" (featuring Da Brat)	Carey; Shropshire; Cox	Carey; Cox	4:13
Total length:				60:01

== Personnel ==
Credits for E=MC² adapted from the album's liner notes.

- Mariah Carey – producer (All Tracks), executive producer, lead vocals (All Tracks), background vocals (All Tracks)
- Marcella Araica – audio mixing (Track 1)
- Miguel Bustamante – audio mixing assistant (Track 1)
- Bryan-Michael Cox – producer, instruments (Tracks 4, 12)
- Aldrin Davis – producer (Track 8)
- Kasseem Daoud Dean – producer (Track 11)
- Jermaine Dupri – producer, audio mixing (Tracks 3, 7, 9–10)
- Mikkel S. Eriksen – producer, recording engineer, instruments (Tracks 6, 13)
- Brian Gartner – recording engineer (All Tracks), audio mixing (Track 14)
- Shawntae Harris – background vocals (Track 11)
- Tor E. Hermansen – producer, instruments (Tracks 6, 13)
- Floyd Nathaniel Hills – producer (Track 1)
- John Horesco IV – recording engineer (Tracks 3, 7, 9–10)
- Josh Houghkirk – audio mixing assistant (Tracks 3, 6–10, 13)
- Jay Wayne Jenkins – rap vocals (Track 5)
- Crystal Johnson – background vocals (Tracks 3, 5–6, 8)
- Jaycen Joshua – audio mixing (Tracks 2, 12)
- Damian Marley – vocals (Track 3)
- Faheem Rasheed Najm – vocals (Track 1)
- Terius Youngdell Nash – producer (Track 2)
- Dave Pensado – audio mixing (Tracks 2, 12)
- James Poyser – producer (Track 14)
- Derrick Selby – recording engineer (Track 8)
- Kelly Sheehan – additional recording engineer (Track 2)
- Manuel Seal – producer (Tracks 3, 7, 9–10)
- Christopher Stewart – producer (Track 2)
- Scott Storch – producer (Track 5)
- Phil Tan – audio mixing (Tracks 3–4, 6–10, 13)
- Maryann Tatum – background vocals (Tracks 1, 6, 11, 13–14)

== Charts ==
=== Weekly charts ===
Chart (2008)	Peak position
Argentine Albums (CAPIF)	10
Australian Albums (ARIA)	2
Australian Urban Albums (ARIA)	1
Austrian Albums (Ö3 Austria)	8
Belgian Albums (Ultratop Flanders)	17
Belgian Albums (Ultratop Wallonia)	25
Canadian Albums (Billboard)	1
Canadian R&B Albums (Nielsen SoundScan)	1
Czech Albums (ČNS IFPI)	39
Danish Albums (Hitlisten)	18
Dutch Albums (Album Top 100)	11
European Albums (Top 100)	3
French Albums (SNEP)	6
German Albums (Offizielle Top 100)	7
Greek Albums (IFPI)	2
Irish Albums (IRMA)	7
Italian Albums (FIMI)	9
Japanese Albums (Oricon)	7
Japanese International Albums (Oricon)	1
Mexican Albums (AMPROFON)	43
New Zealand Albums (RMNZ)	10
Norwegian Albums (VG-lista)	20
Polish Albums (ZPAV)	33
Portuguese Albums (AFP)	15
Scottish Albums (Official Charts)	9
South African Albums (RISA)	18
Spanish Albums (Promusicae)	16
South Korean Albums (RIAK)	1
Swedish Albums (Sverigetopplistan)	22
Swiss Albums (Schweizer Hitparade)	5
Taiwanese Albums (Five Music)	1
UK Albums (Official Charts)	3
UK R&B Albums (Official Charts)	1
US Billboard 200	1
US Top R&B/Hip-Hop Albums (Billboard)	1

=== Year-end charts ===
Chart (2008)	Position
Australian Urban Albums (ARIA)	18
French Albums (SNEP)	156
UK Albums (OCC)	134
US Billboard 200	22
US Top R&B/Hip-Hop Albums (Billboard)	9
Worldwide Albums (IFPI)	26

== Certifications and sales ==
Region	Certification	Certified units/sales
Australia (ARIA)	Gold	35,000^{^}
Brazil (Pro-Música Brasil)	Gold	30,000^{*}
Canada (Music Canada)	Platinum	80,000^{^}
Japan (RIAJ)	Gold	100,000^{^}
New Zealand (RMNZ)	Gold	7,500^{‡}
Philippines (PARI)	Gold	15,000
South Korea	—	7,532
Russia (NFPF)	Gold	10,000^{*}
United Kingdom (BPI)	Gold	136,986
United States (RIAA)	Platinum	1,300,000
Summaries
Worldwide	—	2,500,000
^{*} Sales figures based on certification alone.^{^} Shipments figures based on certification alone.^{‡} Sales+streaming figures based on certification alone.

== Release history ==
Country	Release (standard edition)	Format	Label
Austria	April 11, 2008	CD, digital download	The Island Def Jam Music Group
Italy	April 11, 2008	CD, digital download	The Island Def Jam Music Group
Belgium	April 11, 2008	CD, digital download	The Island Def Jam Music Group
Germany	April 11, 2008	CD, digital download	Universal Music Group
Ireland	April 11, 2008	CD, digital download	The Island Def Jam Music Group
Norway	April 11, 2008	CD, digital download	The Island Def Jam Music Group
Australia	April 14, 2008	CD, digital download	The Island Def Jam Music Group
France	April 14, 2008	CD, digital download	The Island Def Jam Music Group
New Zealand	April 14, 2008	CD, digital download	The Island Def Jam Music Group
United Kingdom	April 14, 2008	CD, digital download	Mercury Records
Canada	April 15, 2008	CD, digital download	Universal Music Group
Japan	April 15, 2008	CD, digital download	The Island Def Jam Music Group
Mexico	April 15, 2008	CD, digital download	The Island Def Jam Music Group
United States	April 15, 2008	CD, digital download	The Island Def Jam Music Group
