= The Elusive Chanteuse Show =

2014 concert tour by Mariah Carey

- Tour by Mariah Carey
- Location: Asia; Australia; New Zealand
- Associated album: Me. I Am Mariah... The Elusive Chanteuse
- Start date: October 4, 2014
- End date: November 16, 2014
- Legs: 2
- No. of shows: 20

Mariah Carey concert chronology
- Australian Tour 2013 (2013); The Elusive Chanteuse Show (2014); All I Want for Christmas Is You... (2014–19)

The Elusive Chanteuse Show was the eighth headlining concert tour by American singer-songwriter Mariah Carey. It was launched in support of her fourteenth studio album, Me. I Am Mariah... The Elusive Chanteuse (2014). The tour began in Tokyo, Japan on October 4, 2014 and concluded in Brisbane, Australia on November 16, 2014.

== Background and development ==
In December 2012, Carey's manager Randy Jackson confirmed that the singer would embark on a world tour following the release of her fourteenth studio album in 2013. Following her departure as a judge on the U.S. singing competition show American Idol in May 2013, Carey's management confirmed that the singer was busy "putting the finishing touches" on the untitled album, performing at the Macy's 4th of July Fireworks and appearing in Lee Daniels film The Butler. In the same statement, in announced plans for a world tour to begin in Asia in October that year.

In an official announcement via the singer's website, Carey wrote the following in regards to her feelings and expectations on the tour: "I want to experience the spontaneity and emotion that I put into this album on stage with my fans," says Carey. "I can't stop writing songs so don't be surprised if you hear a brand new song that I just wrote the night before the show in your city!". The tour was finally announced to begin from October 4, 2014, at the Makuhari Messe Arena and subsequent dates throughout China, Japan and Philippines. Further dates were added for an Australian and New Zealand leg, starting from November.

Mariah Carey became the first western artist to sell out five stadiums in China on a single tour.

== Synopsis ==
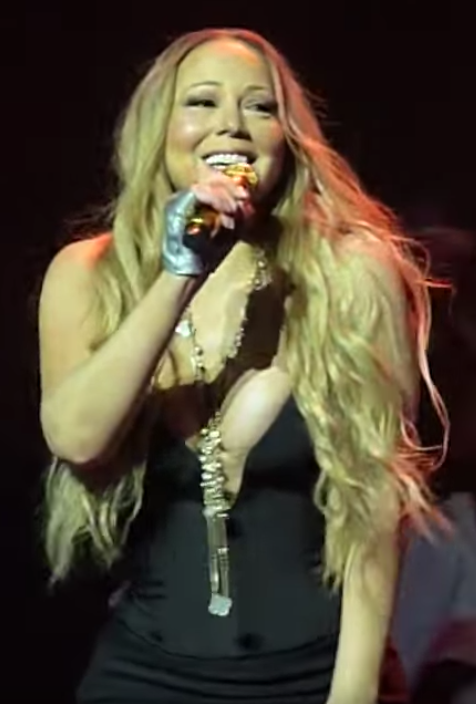
Carey performing in Adelaide during the tour

The main stage was a one level affair, with a large screen backing the singer, which would play exclusive clips, and footage from old video clips from the singers catalogue. The 'cartoon Mariah' from the Heartbreaker video clip was reintroduced, and played for I'm That Chick and Heartbreaker. During Carey's first show of the tour, she was using a signature 'butterfly' microphone, however, it broke on the first night and was not continued in other shows. In select shows, Carey brought her kids, Moroccan and Monroe out on stage during 'Supernatural', which was written about the two. Like always, dancers were used on the tour, with Carey often joining in the dancing.

During some shows, Carey sang All I Want for Christmas Is You and wore a 'Mrs. Claus' outfit. During her song, Thirsty, Carey would make trips around the audience with security guards, allowing the performer to be closer to the audience than ever before. Carey's costumes varied each show, usually staying somewhat similar.

During the shows in Kuala Lumpur, Singapore, Taipei, Adelaide and Melbourne, Carey sang a rendition of "Lullaby of Birdland"; one of these live performances was included in her 2020 compilation The Rarities.

== Critical response ==
Kenneth Chaw from The Star praised the performance in Kuala Lumpur writing that "it was clear the vocalist remains a master of her trade." Natasha Ann Zachariah from The Straits Times gave a positive review for the performance in Singapore, writing the singer "hit those delicious high octaves with ease, giving goosebumps, of the good kind." Alexa Villano from the Rappler wrote the singer's performance in Manila "gave Filipino fans a show they wouldn't soon forget at the Mall of Asia Arena." Candice Barnes from The Sydney Morning Herald gave the performance in Perth three stars writing the singer "seemed to enjoy making fun of herself, something well-received by the crowd, but delivered a few passive aggressive rants which hinted at her diva reputation."

Matt Gilbertson from The Advertiser gave a positive review of the performance in Adelaide writing "the voice that we all came to adore throughout the ‘90s was back. She even hit those famous, piercingly high ‘whistle notes’ during "Emotions". Shuk-Wah Chung from The Guardian gave the performance in Sydney four out of five stars writing Carey "instantly redeemed herself with a trill here, a whispery vocal there and a gentle caress of those signature curves." Joanna Hunkin from The New Zealand Herald gave a positive review for the performance in Auckland writing Carey hit "the supersonic high notes" and "performed those signature vocal gymnastics with relative ease." Suzanne Simonot from The Daily Telegraph praised the performance in Brisbane writing the singer "hasn't just got it, she flaunts it.".

== Set list ==
1. "Across 110th Street" (Introduction)
2. "Fantasy" (Bad Boy Remix)
3. "Touch My Body"
4. "Shake It Off"
5. "Emotions"
6. "Cry."
7. "Fly Like a Bird"
8. "My All"
9. "Heartbreaker (contains elements from "Desert Storm Remix")
10. "#Beautiful"
11. "I'm That Chick"
12. "Honey" (So So Def Remix)
13. "Thirsty"
14. "Meteorite"
15. "Supernatural"
16. "Hero"
17. "Always Be My Baby"
18. "Butterfly Reprise" (Interlude)
19. "We Belong Together" (outro contains elements of Desert Storm Remix)

=== Notes ===
- "Don't Forget About Us" replaced "Touch My Body" in Chiba, Beijing and Chengdu.
- "Fly Like a Bird" was not performed in Chiba, Yokohama, Seoul, Chongqing, Tianjin and Shanghai.
- "Vision of Love" was performed in Chiba, Yokohama and Chengdu.
- "Don't Explain" was performed in Chiba, Seoul and Chongqing.
- "Breakdown" and "I Know What You Want" were performed in Chiba, Yokohama, Seoul, Bangkok, Adelaide, Melbourne, Sydney, Auckland and Brisbane.
- Starting on October 10, "Babydoll" was cut from the set list.
- "The Roof (Back in Time)" was performed in Chiba, Yokohama, Seoul, Bangkok, Melbourne, Sydney and Auckland.
- "I'll Be There" was performed in Chiba, Yokohama, Shanghai, Kuala Lumpur, Singapore, Taipei and Manila.
- During the show in Seoul, Carey performed a medley "Petals" and "Rainbow (Interlude)". Additionally "Cry." and "Hero" were not performed.
- "All I Want for Christmas Is You" was performed in Seoul, Chongqing, Bangkok and Adelaide.
- During shows in China, he "Across 110th Street" video introduction was replaced by a video of Carey's career achievements.
- "Obsessed" performed in Beijing, Bangkok, Adelaide, Melbourne, Sydney and Auckland.
- "Without You" was performed in Beijing.
- "Can't Let Go" was performed in Chengdu.
- "Lullaby of Birdland" was performed in Kuala Lumpur, Singapore, Taipei, Adelaide and Melbourne.
- "Fantasy" was not performed in Bangkok.
- "Crybaby" was performed in Bangkok, Adelaide, Melbourne, Sydney and Auckland.
- "It's Like That" was performed in Bangkok, Adelaide, Melbourne, Sydney, Auckland and Brisbane.
- "Don't Forget About Us" was performed in Bangkok, Sydney, Auckland and Brisbane.
- "Always Be My Baby" was not performed in Perth and Sydney.
- "Heartbreaker" and "#Beautiful" were not performed in Perth and Yarra Valley.
- "Meteorite" was not performed in Perth, Sydney and Brisbane.
- "One Sweet Day" was performed in Melbourne.
- During the show in Brisbane, "Make it Happen" was added to the set list. Additionally, "Thirsty" and"Supernatural" were not performed.

== Shows ==
Date	City	Country	Venue	Opening act
Asia
October 4, 2014	Chiba	Japan	Makuhari Messe	—N/a
October 6, 2014	Yokohama	Japan	Yokohama Arena	—N/a
October 8, 2014	Seoul	South Korea	Olympic Gymnastics Arena	—N/a
October 10, 2014	Beijing	China	Workers' Stadium	—N/a
October 12, 2014	Chengdu	China	Chengdu Sports Center	—N/a
October 15, 2014	Chongqing	China	Chongqing Olympic Sports Center	—N/a
October 17, 2014	Tianjin	China	Tianjin Olympic Center	—N/a
October 19, 2014	Shanghai	China	Hongkou Football Stadium	—N/a
October 22, 2014	Kuala Lumpur	Malaysia	Stadium Merdeka	—N/a
October 24, 2014	Singapore		Singapore National Stadium	—N/a
October 26, 2014	Taipei	Taiwan	TWTC Nangang Exhibition Hall	—N/a
October 28, 2014	Pasay	Philippines	Mall of Asia Arena	—N/a
October 30, 2014	Bangkok	Thailand	Impact Arena	—N/a
Oceania
November 2, 2014	Perth	Australia	Sandalford Estate Swan Valley	—N/a
November 5, 2014	Adelaide	Australia	Adelaide Entertainment Centre	—N/a
November 7, 2014	Melbourne	Australia	Rod Laver Arena	Nathaniel
November 8, 2014	Yarra Valley	Australia	Rochford Wines	—N/a
November 10, 2014	Sydney	Australia	Sydney Entertainment Centre	Nathaniel
November 13, 2014	Auckland	New Zealand	Vector Arena	Titanium
November 16, 2014	Brisbane	Australia	Sirromet Wines	—N/a

== Box office score data ==
List of concerts, showing date, venue, city, tickets sold, number of available tickets and amount of gross revenue
Date	Venue	City	Attendance / Capacity	Revenue
October 10, 2014	Workers' Stadium	Beijing	38,000 / 38,000	—N/a
October 26, 2014	TWTC Nangang Exhibition Hall	Taipei	>13,000 / 15,000	—N/a
November 7, 2014	Rod Laver Arena	Melbourne	6,744 / 6,847	$642,148
November 8, 2014	Rochford Wines	Yarra Valley	4,509 / 12,000	$324,481
November 10, 2014	Sydney Entertainment Centre	Sydney	7,523 / 7,772	$994,219
November 16, 2014	Sirromet Wines	Brisbane	6,071 / 11,000	$605,781
Total			24,847 / 37,619 (66%)	$2,566,629

== Personnel ==
- James "Big Jim" Wright – musical director
- Daniel Moore II - keyboards
- Derrieux Edgecombe – keyboards
- Lance Tolbert - bass
- Joshua Baker – drums
- Trey Lorenz – background vocals
- Mary Ann Tatum – background vocals
- Takeytha Johnson – background vocals
