= Bye Bye (Mariah Carey song) =

Single by Mariah Carey

from the album E=MC²
- Released: April 22, 2008
- Recorded: 2007
- Studio: Roc the Mic Studios (New York, NY)
- Genre: R&B; pop
- Length: 4:26
- Label: Island
- Songwriters: Mariah Carey; Mikkel S. Eriksen; Tor Erik Hermansen; Johntá Austin
- Producers: Stargate; Mariah Carey

Mariah Carey singles chronology
"Touch My Body" (2008)	"Bye Bye" (2008)	"I'll Be Lovin' U Long Time" (2008)

Music video
- "Bye Bye" on YouTube

"Bye Bye" is a song recorded by American singer-songwriter Mariah Carey for her eleventh studio album E=MC² (2008). She co-wrote the song with its producers Mikkel S. Eriksen, Tor Erik Hermansen and Johntá Austin. The pop and R&B track features a piano and keyboard-driven melody. Lyrically, it is a dialogue in between Carey and her deceased father throughout the verses, and a universal salute to departed loved ones on the chorus. The song was released as the second single from E=MC² on April 22, 2008, by Island Records.

"Bye Bye" received generally positive reviews, with many critics considering it a highlight from the album. It peaked at number 19 on the US Billboard Hot 100. In other countries, the song achieved relatively weak charting, and reaching the top-ten in New Zealand; and the top-fifty in Canada, Ireland, Slovakia, and the United Kingdom.

"Bye Bye" was performed on few live televised appearances, in comparison to the large promotional boost given to "Touch My Body". Carey first performed the song on T4, followed by Good Morning America and The Oprah Winfrey Show. Carey performed "Bye Bye" for the final time on the seventh season of American Idol, where she was featured as a mentor for the top-seven week. The song's accompanying music video was directed by Justin Francis on the island of Antigua in the Caribbean. The video features behind-the-scenes footage of Carey and her then fiancé Nick Cannon, the singer promoting the album in the United Kingdom, as well as photos of several of Carey's close friends, family and past collaborators.

== Background ==
'Bye Bye', appears to be about her late father, Alfred Roy, who died of cancer in 2002. Mariah reminisces about the too-little time she shared with her mostly absent father and regrets how as a child, she didn't understand why he failed to show up sometimes to see her after he and her mother divorced when she was 3. But mostly Mariah regrets that he 'never got a chance to see how good I've done / And you never got to see me back at #1'. This confessional moment doesn't last long, since she extends this song about death to be for anybody "who just lost somebody."
—Jennifer Vineyard, MTV News.

During the conception of her ninth studio album Charmbracelet in 2002, Carey's father, Alfred Roy, was diagnosed with cancer. After divorcing from Patricia, Carey's mother, when the singer was only three, he kept only limited contact with her throughout the years, as Patricia continuously moved due to their poverty. During this period of Carey's life, when she was just recovering from a breakdown and career slouch, she began reconnecting with her father during his short time in hospital care. In a song titled "Sunflowers for Alfred Roy", present on Charmbracelet, Carey refers to a moment she shared with him on his death-bed. Critics described the song as "the album's most lyrically personal song" and appreciated its simple piano accompaniment, while Carey retells of a visit she shared with her father in his hospital room, "Strange to feel that proud, strong man / Grip tightly to my hand."

After the release of Charmbracelet and its succeeding album, The Emancipation of Mimi (2005), Carey began working on material for her eleventh studio effort, the yet untitled E=MC² (2008). It was one of the most anticipated albums of 2008, with many critics weighing their opinions on whether Carey would be able to deliver significant success, following her achievements with The Emancipation of Mimi. "Bye Bye" was released as the album's second single, following "Touch My Body", in April 2008. Upon its release, Carey recalled in an interview with MTV:

"Sometimes when I'm writing a song, it does come from such a raw place that I'm actually crying while writing it," Mariah admitted. Her second single, a tribute to her late father, is also meant to reach anyone else who has suffered a loss of a loved one. "Sometimes I hear it and feel that this is going to touch a lot of people, and that's why it's important that no matter what's ever happened to me over my career, that I stay the course and continue to write and try and reach people who need." Anyone who manages to do the reverse, and touch Mariah with one of their songs, "I'm indebted to them forever."

== Composition ==
"Bye Bye"
A 28-second sample of "Bye Bye", illustrating the piano and keyboard-driven melody, and Carey's double vocals during the song's final chorus.

"Bye Bye" is a slow-tempo "inspirational power ballad", which is influenced by R&B and pop music genres. The song is built on an understated and simple piano-driven melody, that is decorated with a soft bass-line. Written by Carey, Mikkel S. Eriksen, Tor Erik Hermansen and Johntá Austin, and produced by the former three, the song drew comparisons to several of Carey's previous musical arrangements featured in both "We Belong Together" and "Don't Forget About Us". According to the sheet music published at Musicnotes.com by Sony/ATV Music Publishing, "Bye Bye" is set in common time with a tempo of 68 beats per minute. It is composed in the key of B-flat major, with Carey's vocal range spanning from the low-note of F_{3} to the high-note of F_{6} in whistle register, and F_{5} in chest voice. The song follows in the chord progression of Bm_{7}–Am_{7}–Gmaj_{7}.

Lyrically, the song was described by critics as a "larger than life anthem", and an "inspirational lighter-in-the-air ballad", where Carey remembers both her father, as well as any lost loved ones. "Bye Bye" begins with an understated chorus, then working into the first verse, in which Carey retells her childhood, and her relationship with her father years ago: "As a child there were them times / I didn't get it, but you kept me alive / I didn't know why you didn't show up sometimes / And its more than saying 'I miss you' / But I'm glad we talked through / All them grown full things separation brings / You never let me know it, you never let it show". Then, the pre-chorus continues describing Carey's emotions in the present, "And everyday life goes on / I wish I could talk to you for a while", and how the loss of her father still affects her day-to-day life.

While the verses are dedicated to him, the chorus was written in a third-person point of view, for her fans: "This is for my peoples who just lost somebody / Your best friend, your baby, your man or your lady / Put your hand way up high / We will never say bye / Mamas, daddies, sisters, brothers, friends and cousins / This is for my peoples who lost their grandmothers / Lift your hands to the sky / Because we won't ever say bye bye". As Carey sings the second chorus, she reverts to the singular conversation with her deceased father, however now revisiting 2005, "And you never got a chance to see how good I've done / And you never got to see me back at No. 1", referencing her return to the top of music with The Emancipation of Mimi. The song does not feature a bridge, instead repeating the chorus twice, once in the same key as the rest of the song, while the other in a raised octave. During the last chorus, Carey's voice is doubled, with her regular tone voice singing softly over the piano chords, while her more prominent and higher pitched vocals are laid over it.

== Critical reception ==
Professional ratings
Review scores
Source	Rating
BBC Radio 1	4/5 stars
Blender	2/5 stars
Blues & Soul	8/10
Digital Spy	2/5 stars

"Bye Bye" received mostly positive reviews from music critics, and was heavily speculated to have become Carey's 19th number-one single on the Billboard Hot 100. Many reviewers complimented its simple and understated musical arrangement and personalized lyrics, while some felt the song was too simple for an artist of Carey's stature. Jeffrey Mitchell from The Hollywood Reporter described it as a "high point" on the album, and wrote "Mariah softly and sweetly lamenting the loss of any kind of loved one on the truly touching 'Bye Bye'. Mitchell concluded his review put stock in the song's success, and ended with "Thankfully, it looks like we won’t be saying “bye” to Mariah for a long time." An anonymous journalist writing in for MTV UK called "Bye Bye" a "tear jerking ode to people who have passed away", and assumed it would "have reality pop contestants singing away for decades to come!" The Houston Chronicle's Goey Guerra highlighted the song as "truly trademark Mimi", and described it as "a lighters-and-hands-in-the-air tribute to deceased loved ones". Dan Hinkley of Daily News branded it "the album's most potentially personal song", and assured it would become Carey's 19th chart-topping single in the United States. The song received positive response from both Rolling Stone's Christian Hoard and Yahoo! Music writer Dann Gennoe, who describes the track as a "piano-based big-voiced" and "lighter-friendly" ballad. In his review of E=MC², a writer from the Los Angeles Times described the song's lyrics and production in detail:

When Carey tries to open up a bit more, her sentiments are the equivalent of a Hallmark Precious Moments figurine. In a ballad 'Bye Bye', Carey isn't taking chances, designing the lyrics for mass appeal by dedicating them to anyone who ever lost somebody, be it 'your best friend, your baby, your man or your lady'. But Carey gracefully pulls off the universality of the lyrics, and the tune will likely be a massive hit.

A columnist from the British newspaper New! described "Bye Bye" as their "favorite track" and wrote, "the delicious 'Bye Bye' is a classic slushy Mariah ballad, with a swoonsome chorus." Jonathan Reyes from Rap-Up felt the track would get listeners "teary eyed", and due to it being a "song everyone can relate too", assure it would become Carey's next number-one single. While ABC News writer, Steve Jones, described how "Bye Bye" packed the bum with "an emotional wallop", The Washington Post's Freedom De Luc compared it heavily to "Don't Forget About Us", Carey's 2005 single. De Luc wrote how both shared similar piano instrumentation, however different lyrical settings; "Don't Forget About Us" finds Carey playing a "broken-hearted lover", while "Bye Bye" an "inspirational song that comes with its own set of suggested demographics and instructions." Some reviewers felt the song was a sub-par effort from an artist of Carey's stature, with many describing it as unoriginal and not a good follow-up single to "Touch My Body". Entertainment Weekly's Margeaux Watsman felt "Bye Bye" was an "odd choice" for a second single, and called it "somber edgy". Nick Levine from Digital Spy described the track as a "shmaltzy ballad", while an anonymous VH1 critic wrote "with the “We Belong Together” sonic template and lyrics tailored appeal to everyone on such a basic level seems like too easy of a combination for someone as established as Mimi. This one's like insurance – in case nothing else is a hit, here's a sure-shot. But ultimately, it turns out that the album is too good for that."

== Chart performance ==
"Bye Bye" served as the second single from the album E=MC². Though released in the United States, the United Kingdom, Australia and other select parts of Europe, the song was not sent to radio stations in countries like the Netherlands, France, Norway and Switzerland, where "I'll Be Lovin' U Long Time", the album's third official single, was released instead. "Bye Bye" debuted at number twenty-three on the Billboard Hot 100 as the "Hot Shot Debut", selling 60,000 downloads. Following her performance of the song on American Idol and The Oprah Winfrey Show, it eventually peaked at number nineteen on the Hot 100, and at number thirty-three on the Billboard Hot R&B/Hip-Hop Songs. The track eventually peaked at number thirty-four on the Canadian Hot 100, and stayed within the chart for a total of twelve weeks. As of February 2014, "Bye Bye" had sold 598,000 copies in the United States.

On the main chart in Europe, "Bye Bye" peaked at number eighty-four on the European Hot 100. It debuted and peaked at number seventy in Germany, and debuted at number eighty-eight on the UK Singles Chart. Six weeks later, on July 5, 2008, the song peaked at number thirty, due to the release of the song's music video. In Asia, "Bye Bye" charted on the Japan Hot 100, peaking at number seventy-three. In New Zealand, reached number seven in its third week. After a total of eight weeks, the song dropped out of the top 40. The song achieved relatively low peaks throughout other countries where it charted, including number forty-three in Australia, forty in Ireland and number fifty in Slovakia.

== Remixes ==
The main official remix, the "So So Def Remix", produced by Carey and Jermaine Dupri, features a verse by Jay-Z (Carey provided new background vocals on his verse) and Jermaine Dupri on background vocals. In an interview with MTV News, Dupri described the remix as "crazy", and said "Young Hov and Mariah crank it up, and myself, JD — a.k.a. Barry Bonds — cleans up." When asked if it would sound awkward due to the song's melancholy nature, he answered "we'll forget about the sad sentiments". A writer from Rap-Up gave the remix a positive review, calling it "FIRE!". An additional remix was released, titled the "R&B Remix", and features vocals from Akon, and an under-stated rap from Lil Wayne.

== Music video ==
The music video was directed by Justin Francis, and co-directed by Nick Cannon on the island of Eleuthera in the Bahamas. The video became notable for the pair, due to the fact that it was during its conception and recording that they began dating, and eventually wed two months later. The video was shot in early April 2008, but was delayed until May, with several critics suggesting it because of the couples engagement. In an interview with People, Cannon spoke of his feelings when first speaking with Carey regarding the video: "From the first time we sat down to discuss the video at the Beverly Hills Hotel, we connected. We had so much in common spiritually, and we laugh at the same things. I didn't have to put on my Mac Daddy suave mode. I was able to be myself with her. We are both eternally 12 years old." The couple stayed on the island for over two weeks after the nuptials for their honeymoon, which is why the video was delayed until mid-May, so Carey would be able to promote it in time.

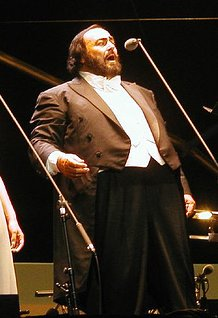
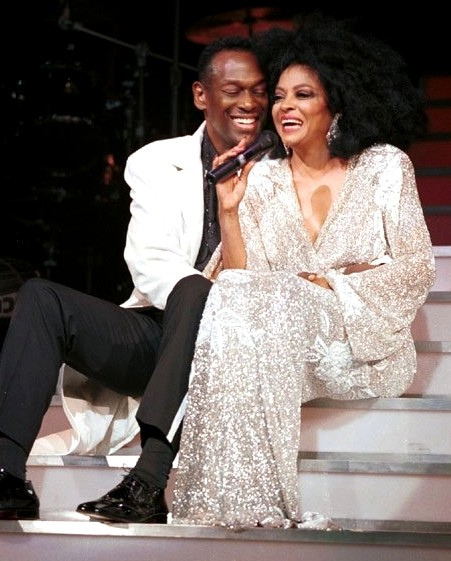
Carey's inclusion of the photographs with Luciano Pavarotti and Luther Vandross (both pictured) garnered praise from critics, who felt it was the singer's way of honoring her past collaborators memories.

The video consists of multiple scenes with Carey and (now ex-husband) Cannon, who plays her love interest. This is shown along with various behind-the-scenes footage of Carey at various promotional events in the United Kingdom. The video begins with grainy footage of a plane landing in the Bahamas, with Carey and Cannon exiting the aircraft with her dog. Throughout the video, scenes of Carey laying on a sofa, writing lyrics and tearing, as well as the singer in a darkened stage are shown. Several behind-the-scenes clips of Carey promoting the album in the United Kingdom are shown, as she arrives at a CD signing, and connects with fans. Following the signing, Carey is shown at a fashion show, as well as modelling in several outfits. Other scenes that intermingle are of Carey looking out of her hotel suite window in London, as well as candles being put out. During the second verse, the couple is seen spending time together on the island, spending time with friends at a small gathering at the pool, as well as moments of Carey modeling for her bikini photo shoot for the June issue of Vibe. The video's final segment is of Carey performing the song at a concert in a large theatre, while several photos are sporadically shown. Photographs of several of Carey's deceased friends and family members are shown, including her dog, Jack, her father Alfred Roy, her grandmother Addie, David Cole, Luciano Pavarotti, Ol' Dirty Bastard, and Luther Vandross, all of whom Carey had collaborated with during her career. Critics complimented the inclusion of the photos with both Pavarotti and Vandross, and considered it Carey's way of honoring them. The music video peaked at #4 on Billboard's Hot Videoclip Tracks chart.

== Live performances ==
On the seventh season of the popular talent competition American Idol, Carey was featured as a mentor for the top-seven week. Titled "Mariah Carey Week" and airing live on April 14, 2008, the contestants were to perform a song from Carey's catalog. After all seven contestants sang their individual songs, they all came together for a live rendition of Carey's 1996 collaboration with Boyz II Men, "One Sweet Day". Overall, critics noted how a Carey themed week would be extremely difficult for the performers, due to their vocally strenuous nature. Following their joint performance, Carey emerged onto the stage in a black mini-dress, and performed "Bye Bye" live, while backed by a trio of supporting vocalists. Tamara Jones of The Washington Post jokingly commented on Carey's flailing hand movements during the performance, writing how she was "waving like a malevolent homecoming queen". Gil Kaufman from MTV News complimented Carey's performance, commenting on her "barely there micro-dress" and writing how she "serenaded the audience with her homage to lost ones." The Calgary Sun's Lindsey Ward described it as a "less-than-fab performance", although complimenting on Carey's leaner figure, "Oh, who am I kidding? She would look hot in a paper bag."

On April 25, 2008, Carey opened the Good Morning America "Summer Concert Series" with a live performance in Times Square. She completed a three-song set-list with her follow-up single, "Bye Bye". After marking the album's stateside launch with her appearance on Good Morning America, Carey took to Europe to perform on several programs, one of which included a live rendition of "Bye Bye". She began with an interview on the British radio station, BBC Radio 1, and continued onto a live performance of the song on T4. On April 12, 2008, Carey made an appearance on The Oprah Winfrey Show. Winfrey interviewed the singer on her weight loss, E=MC², and even showed footage of Carey in her New York apartment, showing off her lingerie closet. Following the interview, Carey, dressed in a purple and black ensemble, performed a live rendition of "Bye Bye" for the audience, with three background vocalists assisting her. Kevin Johnson from St. Louis Post-Dispatch described the performance as "touching", and complimented the song's appeal.

== Track listings and formats ==
- International CD single
1. "Bye Bye" – 4:26
2. "Bye Bye" (So So Def Remix feat. Jay-Z) – 3:57
- International enhanced CD single
1. "Bye Bye" – 4:29
2. "Touch My Body" (Subkulcha Radio Edit) – 4:35
3. "We Belong Together" (Remix feat. Jadakiss & Styles P.) – 4:30
4. "Bye Bye" (Video)

== Credits and personnel ==
Credits for E=MC² adapted from the album's liner notes.

- Mariah Carey – songwriting, producer, vocals, background vocals
- Mikkel S. Eriksen – songwriting, producer
- Tor Erik Hermansen – songwriting, producer
- Christopher Stewart – songwriting, producer
- Johntá Austin – songwriting
- Josh Houghkirk – audio mixing
- Bernie Grundman – mastering
- Maryann Tatum – background vocals

== Charts ==
=== Weekly charts ===
Weekly chart performance for "Bye Bye"
Chart (2008–2011)	Peak position
Australia (ARIA)	53
Australian Urban (ARIA)	18
Belgium (Ultratip Bubbling Under Flanders)	15
Belgium (Ultratip Bubbling Under Wallonia)	18
Canada Hot 100 (Billboard)	34
Canada CHR/Top 40 (Billboard)	15
Canada Hot AC (Billboard)	44
Germany (GfK)	70
Ireland (IRMA)	40
Japan (Japan Hot 100)	73
New Zealand (Recorded Music NZ)	7
New Zealand Pop Radio (RadioScope)	36
New Zealand Urban Radio (RadioScope)	5
Romania (Romanian Top 100)	86
Scottish Singles Sales (Official Charts)	17
Slovakia Airplay (ČNS IFPI)	50
South Korea International (Gaon)	73
Turkey (Türkiye Top 20)	14
UK Singles (Official Charts)	30
UK Hip Hop/R&B (Official Charts)	2
US Billboard Hot 100	19
US Hot R&B/Hip-Hop Songs (Billboard)	33
US Latin Rhythm Airplay (Billboard)	35
US Pop Airplay (Billboard)	18
US Pop 100 (Billboard)	20
US Rhythmic Airplay (Billboard)	9
US Rhythmic (Mediabase)	9
US Top 40 (Mediabase)	17
US Urban (Mediabase)	19
Venezuela Anglo (Record Report)	11

=== Year-end charts ===
Year-end chart performance for "Bye Bye"
Chart (2008)	Position
Brazil (Crowley)	54
US Mainstream Top 40 (Billboard)	86
US Rhythmic (Billboard)	63

== Certifications ==
Certifications and sales for "Bye Bye"
Region	Certification	Certified units/sales
Brazil (Pro-Música Brasil)	Gold	30,000^{‡}
New Zealand (RMNZ)	Gold	15,000^{‡}
United States (RIAA)	Platinum	1,000,000^{‡}
^{‡} Sales+streaming figures based on certification alone.

== Release history ==
Release dates and formats for "Bye Bye"
Region	Date	Format(s)	Label(s)	Ref.
United States	April 22, 2008	Contemporary hit radio; rhythmic contemporary radio	Island	
United States	May 27, 2008	Digital download	Island	
United Kingdom	June 16, 2008	CD; maxi CD	Mercury	
Belgium	June 24, 2008	CD	Universal Music	
Taiwan	June 27, 2008	Maxi CD	Universal Music	
Australia	July 14, 2008	Maxi CD	Universal Music	
Germany	July 18, 2008	Maxi CD	Universal Music	
