= I'm That Chick =

Song by Mariah Carey

- "#MC30" EP artwork

Song by Mariah Carey

from the album E=MC²
- Studio: Roc the Mic Studios, New York City; Honeysouth Studios, Miami
- Genre: Disco
- Length: 3:31
- Label: Island Def Jam
- Songwriters: Mariah Carey; Mikkel S. Eriksen; Tor E. Hermansen; Johntá Austin; Rod Temperton
- Producers: Carey; Stargate

"I'm That Chick" is a song by American singer Mariah Carey from her eleventh studio album, E=MC² (2008). A disco track with influences of R&B, it was written by Carey, Johntá Austin and production duo Stargate (Mikkel S. Eriksen and Tor E. Hermansen). It contains elements of "Off the Wall" by Michael Jackson. Rod Temperton, the song's composer, received a songwriting credit for "I'm That Chick" as result.

The track was positively received amongst most music critics, many of whom called it the best song on the album and praised its disco composition. Carey performed "I'm That Chick" on The Hills season premiere party, the 2008 Fashion Rocks, Canadian Idol, and included it on the set-list of her eighth concert tour, The Elusive Chanteuse Show (2014), as also first co-headlining tour with Lionel Richie, All The Hits Tour (2017). It peaked at number 82 on the US Billboard Hot R&B/Hip-Hop Songs chart.

== Recording and composition ==
"I'm That Chick" is a disco song with R&B influences The Guardian's Alex Macpherson noted that the R&B element borrowed from 2008 trend in the genre of using a time signature of 4/4. He thought that the disco style of the song was reminiscent of some of Carey's compositions in the beginning of her career, and believed that it was not a coincidence that Carey's album shares its name with one released by Giorgio Moroder, a disco and EDM DJ and producer, 1979. Carey employs a "gritty" but "effortless" "feathery vocal approach" on the track, similar to that of Jackson's on "Off the Wall".

== Reception ==
Sarah Rodman of The Boston Globe declared "I'm That Chick" as the best track on the album. PopMatters writer Evan Sawdey wrote "the few times that she is handed a truly effortless stunner on E=MC2, she absolutely knocks it out of the park" with regard to "I'm That Chick" and "Side Effects". He continued to write that the former "could very well be the disc’s highlight", but felt that Carey sounded like an unknown popstar. However, Jayanthi Daniels of The New York Sun was critical of "I'm That Chick" as well as "Side Effects", describing them as "throwaway pop tracks" on a hip-hop album. The Advocate's Sara Levy called described the track as "irresistible" and a "coy surprise", while Nick Levine of Digital Spy similarly wrote that it is "irresistible disco candy." Joey Guerra from the Houston Chronicle felt that the "Off the Wall" sample "breathed life" into the track, writing that the only things which are missing are "roller skates and short-shorts". Eric Henderson of Slant Magazine gave a detailed evaluation of the song's composition, comparing it to Carey's 2001 soundtrack album Glitter and to Janet Jackson's 2008 song "Feedback":

'I'm That Chick' is a retro treatsicle in the best, most Glitter-iest sense. It's pinker than Pepto-Bismol and just as soothing, and for whatever reason, Mariah's fudged enunciation on the chorus turns 'I'm that chick you like' into 'I'll have chicken, lite.' The triumph of the song is that, when all of our dance-floor divas these days seem to throw one disco-descendant banger on their otherwise hip-hop-hybrid LPs almost out of obligation, 'I'm That Chick' doesn't feel even as tokenistic as Janet's 'Feedback' (which I like more, but only out of context).

== Live performances ==
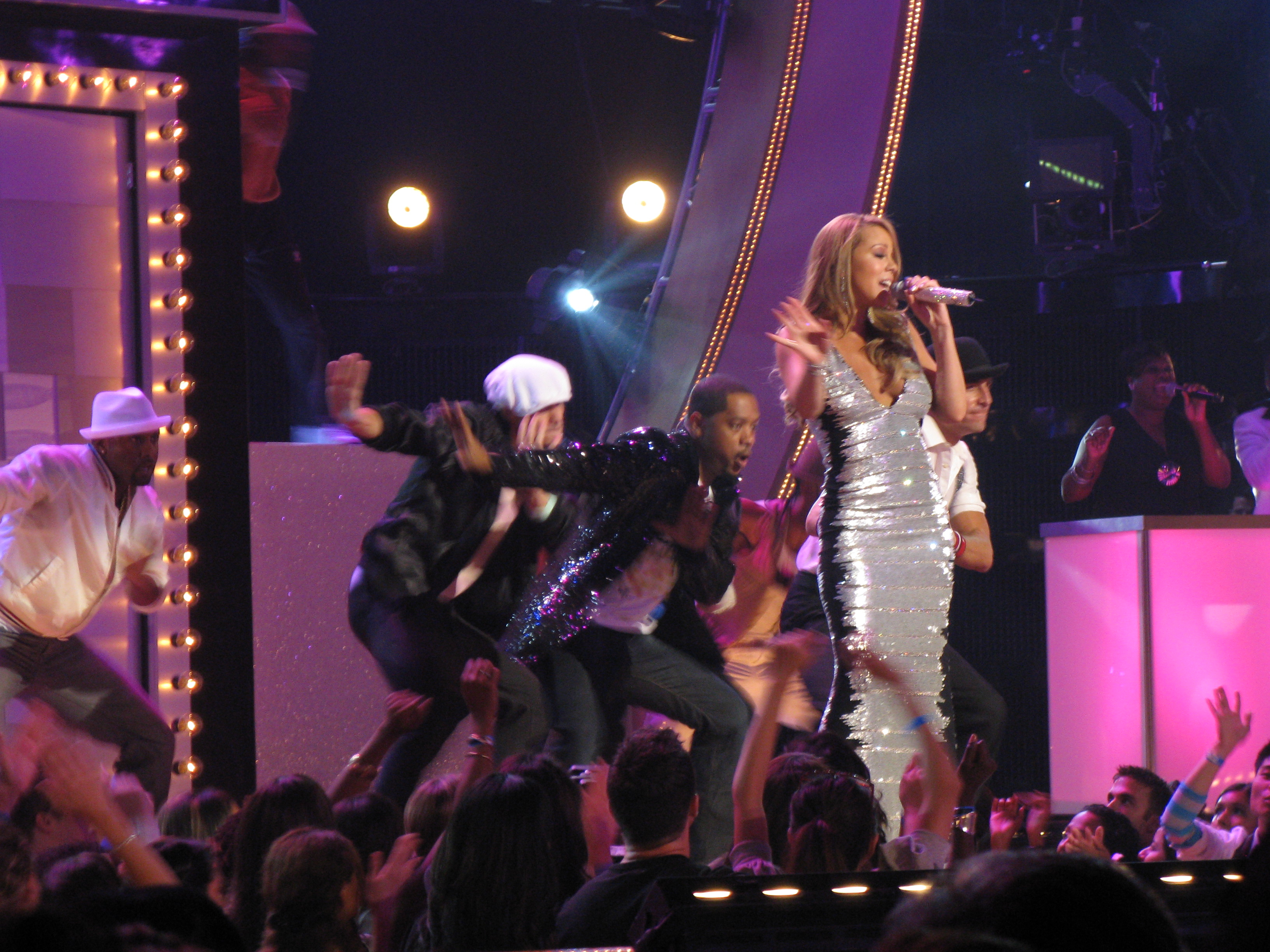
Carey opening the 2008 Fashion Rocks ceremony with a live performance of "I'm That Chick".

On March 25, 2008, Carey was featured as the special guest performer at The Hills season premiere party, an event marking the start of a span of ten episodes airing in between season three and four. Carey performed "Touch My Body", "I'm That Chick" and "We Belong Together". After the performance, Carey received strong praise from the program's cast members, with Lauren Conrad saying "I've always been a huge Mariah fan, and she's just so beautiful and talented', while Whitney Port and Audrina Patridge referred to Carey as "an amazing singer", while claiming to have listened to her music from a young age.

On July 22, 2008, Carey was announced as one of the performers at the 2008 Fashion Rocks ceremony. At the event on September 6, 2008, the event opened with a live performance of "Just Stand Up!", a charity single in which Carey partook alongside other female artists including Carrie Underwood. Carey later performed "I'm That Chick" alongside several male dancers, opening the song with a spontaneous a cappella of the track's chorus to positive critical response. A writer from Marie Claire complimented the performance, describing the rendition as "true glamtastic Mariah style". A few days later, Carey reprised her performance of "I'm That Chick" on Canadian Idol, along with "We Belong Together". The track was included on the set-list Carey's The Elusive Chanteuse Show in 2014 and All the Hits Tour in 2017. It was also included in the setlist of the fourth leg of The Butterfly Returns in 2020 as part of the "Car Ride Medley".

== Track listing ==
I'm That Chick – EP

1. "I'm That Chick" (Subkulcha Club Mix) — 6:54
2. "I'm That Chick" (Subkulcha Radio Mix) — 4:00

== Charts ==
Chart (2008)	Peak position
US Hot R&B/Hip-Hop Songs (Billboard)	82
