= Migrate (song) =

Song by Mariah Carey featuring T-Pain

from the album E=MC²
- Released: April 11, 2008
- Studio: Roc the Mic (New York City): Honeysouth (North Miami); Circle House (Miami)
- Genre: Hip hop; club; crunk; dance; hip pop; R&B
- Length: 4:17
- Label: Island Def Jam
- Songwriters: Mariah Carey; Nate Hills; Balewa Muhammad; T-Pain
- Producers: Nate "Danja" Hills; Mariah Carey

"Migrate" is a song by American singer-songwriter Mariah Carey from her eleventh studio album, E=MC² (2008). It was written and produced by Carey and Danja, with additional songwriting from The Clutch and the track's featured artist, T-Pain. An up-tempo hip hop club track, it is about Carey's movement on a girls' night out, ranging from the club, the bar, the VIP lounge, the after party and the hotel. Critical response to the song was mixed, with many critics disapproving of Carey's decision to use Auto-Tune on her vocals. Despite not being a single, in the United States, "Migrate" peaked at number ninety-two on the Billboard Hot 100 chart, ninety-five on the Hot R&B/Hip-Hop Songs chart and sixty-nine on the Pop 100 chart. Carey and T-Pain performed the song on Saturday Night Live.

== Background and composition ==
American singer-songwriter Mariah Carey experienced great commercial success with her tenth studio album, The Emancipation of Mimi (2005). While conceptualizing its follow-up, E=MC² (2008), she was encouraged by American rapper Jay Z to utilize slang as one of the record's elements. Based on her use of the word "migrate" in everyday life, such as when moving between rooms in her house, Carey conceived the song "Migrate" for the album. After writing the lyrics and music with Nate "Danja" Hills, Balewa Muhammad, and T-Pain, Carey produced "Migrate" with Danja. Brian Garten recorded it with the aid of James "Scrappy" Stassen at Roc the Mic Studios in New York City; Honeysouth Studios in North Miami, Florida; and Circle House Studios in Miami. Marcella "Ms. Lago" Araica handled the mixing with assistance from Miguel Bustamente at The Hit Factory in Miami, and Bernie Grundman completed the mastering in Los Angeles.

Lyrically, "Migrate" details the events of a fast-paced girls' night out. Described by Carey as "about migrating from one place to another", she documents moving between car, club, bar, VIP lounge, party, afterparty, and hotel. Carey sings: "Once again nothin' jumpin' up in your place / Sick of your Berry buzzin' all in my face." Seeking the best club, she hears the DJ playing her favorite song and is given free drinks to boost the venue's reputation. Carey describes the intoxicating effects of sipping pinot grigio wine and tells of her penchant for particular men: "If you're inked-up thuggin', that's what I like." In his verse, T-Pain raps about the attractiveness of a woman's body, namechecks Carey, and encourages her not to wait for him to buy her a drink. References to brands such as the liquor Patrón and the automobiles Lamborghini and Chevrolet are incorporated in the song. According to Jennifer Vineyard of MTV News, Carey represents herself "in full diva mode". It was described as a party anthem and about living the high life.

Many music critics categorized "Migrate" as a hip hop or club track. Others described it as crunk, dance, hip pop, "high-tech R&B", or "future funk". It contains elements of exotica and reggae. It received comparisons to Carey's 2005 song "It's Like That", the 1979 Kool & the Gang song "Ladies' Night", and music by Brandy Norwood and Rodney Jerkins. The composition was variously described as booming, bouncy, bristling, disorienting, flirty, funky, hard-hitting, hypnotic, sinister, sleek, slow-burning, seductive, sensual, and thumping.

"Migrate"
"Migrate" begins with a capella vocals by Carey processed using Auto-Tune, which either imitate or are used as the basis for the loop that follows.

Carey's and T-Pain's voices are distorted with the Auto-Tune audio technology throughout "Migrate". The Star-Ledger critic Jay Lustig described them as "processed, almost inhuman-sounding". Carey adopts T-Pain's style by using the device; he had popularized it in the years prior to the song's recording. "Migrate" begins a cappella, with Carey singing a riff in staccato using her famous high-pitched whistle register. Some writers thought this trill mimics, perhaps in a form of self-mockery, a keyboard's flute-sounding "descending echo-synth" loop which immediately follows and acts as the composition's backbone. Others stated that the loop was a warped sample of her arpeggio opening vocals. Aside from the song's beginning and conclusion, Carey's voice is largely situated in the middle of her vocal range. Her delivery was compared to those of American singers R. Kelly and Tori Amos.

== Critical reception ==
"Migrate" received mixed reviews from music writers upon the release of E=MC². Several described it as a highlight from the album, or as an effective album opener. Others were critical of the song and viewed it as lazy, dull, or unconvincing. Some considered "Migrate" in alignment with musical trends, while others thought it was generic. Disagreement recurred regarding the performance of T-Pain, with some arguing he overshadowed Carey and others stating her presence remained strong.

Carey's vocals were another topic of commentary; some critics felt they aligned with the song's production. The use of Auto-Tune was largely viewed negatively and as unbecoming of her vocal ability. For Slate writer Jody Rosen, it was "an act of vocal self-sabotage that once would have been unthinkable". AllMusic editor Stephen Thomas Erlewine was more amenable, arguing the processing was "a little odd ... but it not only makes Mariah modern, it also camouflages her slightly diminishing range, so it does have a dual purpose".

Retrospectively, critics have considered "Migrate" a high point in Carey's discography. Andrew Chan, author of Why Mariah Carey Matters (2023), called it "one of her funniest" songs. For The National's Alex Macpherson, "Migrate" is one of Carey's tracks that warrants greater attention. Adam White of The Independent grouped it among Carey's "career classics" and Princess Gabbara argued in Vibe that it demonstrates her musical competency across a range of styles. The Gay Times ranked "Migrate" as the 14th-best song of Carey's career on a 2019 list and Billboard placed it at number 17 in their 2020 compilation of her 100 best tracks.

== Release and commercial performance ==
Previewed at multiple private listening parties before the album's release, "Migrate" is the first song on E=MC², which Island Records issued on April 11, 2008. After Chicago radio station WBBM-FM had premiered the track to a public audience ten days earlier, Rap-Up suggested the label release it as a single. Both Vibe and Entertainment Weekly predicted "Migrate" could become successful to the point of recognition as the song of the summer in the United States. It ultimately spent one week at number 92 on the Billboard Hot 100 chart in the magazine issue dated May 3, 2008. "Migrate" also entered the genre-specific Pop 100 chart at number 69 and Hot R&B/Hip-Hop Songs at number 95. Elsewhere, the song reached number 70 on the Billboard digital downloads chart in Canada.

In later years, commentary about "Migrate" referred to an unrealized commercial viability. The Washington Post critic Chris Richards gauged the song as "shoulda-been-ginormous" in a 2009 article. Writers Tim Chan from Rolling Stone and Alexis Petridis from The Guardian faulted its lack of release as a single. According to Macpherson, "Migrate" could have helped E=MC² achieve its sales potential had the song been selected as the album's second single in lieu of "Bye Bye" which he felt "prematurely sank the campaign". In 2015, Carey described "Migrate" as one of her favorite tracks and expressed disappointment that the song was never issued as a single. It has since become appreciated by her fans as a deep cut.

== Live performances ==
Carey debuted "Migrate" on the March 15, 2008, episode of the American late-night television program Saturday Night Live. Accompanied by T-Pain, Carey substituted for Janet Jackson as a musical guest due to the latter's sickness. She then sang it for the BET television special, MC^{2}: The Relativity of Mariah, broadcast on April 16, 2008. The next year, Carey performed "Migrate" at the first date of the 2009–2010 Angels Advocate Tour on December 31, 2009, at Madison Square Garden in New York City.

== Credits and personnel ==
Credits are adapted from the liner notes of E=MC².

=== Recording ===
- Recorded at Roc the Mic Studios (New York, New York), Honeysouth Studios (North Miami, Florida), Circle House Studios (Miami, Florida)
- Mixed at The Hit Factory (Miami, Florida)
- Mastered at Bernie Grundman Mastering (Los Angeles, California)

=== Personnel ===
- Mariah Carey – writer, producer, background vocals
- Nate "Danja" Hills – writer, producer
- Balewa Muhammad – writer
- T-Pain – writer
- Brian Garten – engineering
- James "Scrappy" Stassen – additional engineering
- Marcella "Ms. Lago" Araica – mixing
- Miguel Bustamante – assistant mixing
- Maryann Tatum – background vocals
- Bernie Grundman – mastering

== Charts ==
Chart (2008)	Peak position
Canada Digital Song Sales (Billboard)	70
US Billboard Hot 100	92
US Hot R&B/Hip-Hop Songs (Billboard)	95
US Pop 100 (Billboard)	69
