= I'll Be Lovin' U Long Time =

2008 single by Mariah Carey

Single by Mariah Carey

from the album E=MC²
- Released: July 1, 2008
- Recorded: 2007
- Studio: Honeysouth Studios (North Miami, FL); Soundtrap (Atlanta, GA)
- Genre: R&B; hip hop; pop
- Length: 3:01 (album version); 3:50 (remix)
- Label: Island
- Songwriters: Mariah Carey; Aldrin Davis; Crystal Johnson; Clifford Harris; Mark DeBarge; Etterlene Jordan
- Producers: Mariah Carey; DJ Toomp

Mariah Carey singles chronology
"Bye Bye" (2008)	"I'll Be Lovin' U Long Time" (2008)	"Right to Dream" (2008)

T.I. singles chronology
"No Matter What" (2008)	"I'll Be Lovin' U Long Time" (remix) (2008)	"Whatever You Like" (2008)

Alternative cover
- Remix single cover

Music video
- "I'll Be Loving U Long Time" (remix) on YouTube

"I'll Be Lovin' U Long Time" is a song recorded by American singer-songwriter Mariah Carey for her eleventh studio album E=MC² (2008). It was produced by Carey, Aldrin Davis, who wrote it alongside Crystal Johnson and Clifford Harris. As the song's hook and instrumentation is derived from sampling DeBarge's "Stay with Me", Mark DeBarge and Etterlene Jordan also share songwriting credits. Lyrically, the song demonstrates the lengths the protagonist will go for her lover. It was released as the third single from E=MC² on July 1, 2008, by Island Records; its remix featuring T.I. was simultaneously released.

Music critics gave "I'll Be Lovin' U Long Time" generally favorable reviews, with many citing it as the album's standout track. Some reviewers criticized it for being too simple for an artist of Carey's caliber, while others praised its production and deft interpolation of the DeBarge sample. Though expected by critics to become a hit, the song only managed to peak at number 58 on the US Billboard Hot 100.

Carey performed "I'll Be Lovin' U Long Time" on several live televised appearances, including the 2008 MTV Video Music Awards Japan, Jimmy Kimmel Live!, and the 2008 Teen Choice Awards. Additionally, the song was featured on the final scene of You Don't Mess with the Zohan (2008), in which Carey made a cameo appearance. The song's accompanying music video was shot over a three-day interval in Hawaii, and makes usage of the islands scenery, as well as shots of Carey in several bikinis, while swimming with a dolphin.

== Background ==
Throughout 2004, Carey began conceptualizing and working on a new project, eventually titled The Emancipation of Mimi, her tenth studio effort. The album became the best-selling album in the United States of 2005, and the second best-seller around the world, with over 12 million units sold. It earned a myriad of music industry awards, and brought Carey back to the top of pop music following her decline in 2001. After completing The Adventures of Mimi Tour, Carey began working on material for her eleventh studio effort, the yet untitled E=MC² (2008). E=MC² was hailed as one of the most anticipated albums of 2008, with many critics weighing their opinions on whether Carey would be able to deliver significant success, following her achievements with The Emancipation of Mimi. "Touch My Body" was eventually chosen as the lead single through a vote in between the record executives at Island Records, with the final choices being the former and "I'm That Chick" (titled "I'm That Chick You Like" at that point). After choosing the former, the song was sent to radio stations worldwide on February 12, 2008, and to digital outlets on March 24, 2008.

"Touch My Body" experiences strong commercial success, becoming Carey's eighteenth chart-topping single on the Billboard Hot 100, as well as placing within the top-five in several European countries. As a result, E=MC² debuted at number one in Canada and the United States, with the highest first-week sales of Carey's career, and in the top three in Australia and the United Kingdom. Following in a similar formula as her last album, Carey chose a ballad to be the follow-up single, "Bye Bye". Though receiving praise from music critics, and strong speculation that it would become another worldwide hit for Carey, the song stalled at number nineteen on the Hot 100, and achieved weak international charting. Subsequently, Carey's label, Island Records, decided to release an up-tempo and dance-able number that would be easily a "summer hit". They chose "I'll Be Lovin' U Long Time", and released it to US radio stations on July 1, 2008, and to several European markets throughout August.

== Composition ==
"I'll Be Lovin' U Long Time"
A sample of "I'll Be Lovin' U Long Time", featuring the keyboard-driven melody, as well as the double voice throughout the bridge. Lyrically, the song finds Carey describing her love and devotion for her lover, and how she will 'love him long time'.

"I'll Be Lovin' U Long Time" is a "mid-tempo", "party jam", that draws influence from pop, R&B and soul music genres. Critics elaborated on the song's "soul" influence, with Melissa Ruggieri from The News & Advance described it as a "soul-thumper", while Digital Spy's Nick Levine called it a "nod towards classic soul". The song's title is derived from the popular line, "me love you long time", from the 1987 war film, Full Metal Jacket. Additionally, its hook and instrumentation is derived from sampling DeBarge's "Stay with Me". Critics also noted how "I'll Be Lovin' U Long Time" "recalls" the melody riff and chord progression of the Hill Street Blues's theme song. The song's main source of production comes from its "lush keyboard work", and Carey's usage of the "double voice", which she uses throughout the song's bridge. Carey described the effect as "layering her voice", so that the bridge would sound like a "swooning bank of a hundred Mariahs". The song was written by Carey, Aldrin Davis, Crystal Johnson and Clifford Harris, and features Mark DeBarge and Etterlene Jordan on the songwriting credits, due to the inclusion of the samples. "I'll Be Lovin' U Long Time" was produced by Carey and Davis (DJ Toomp), and is arranged in the key of D-flat major, with Carey's vocal range spanning from the low-note of A_{3} to the high-note of D_{5}.

Lyrically, the song tells of the protagonist's devotion to her lover, proclaiming that while she knows "you've got me", she'll be "lovin' him long time". The first verse begins with "You ain't even got to worry / About a thing, I've got you babe / And ain't nobody takin' me away / Its not a game I'm here to stay", describing her strong emotional attachment to him. As the verse continues, Carey makes references and comparisons to their love and drugs powerful effect over the body and its senses. Carey describes the limits of her love during the chorus, singing "As long as I can breathe" and "Eternally". During the second verse, she sings how no matter what others say about their relationship, they will continue being together, and describing a private moment they shared, their "Little spot where no one knows".

=== Lyrical controversy ===
At the time of its release, "I'll Be Lovin' U Long Time" was the subject of controversy with the Asian community, as well as comedian Margaret Cho. In the film Full Metal Jacket, an Asian prostitute approaches US troops and offers to engage in lewd conduct in exchange for money. She uses terms such as "Me so horny" and "me love you long time", which were heavily parodied and popularized. Accordingly, those terms have been used as humor at the expense of Asian people, and have been described as "racial slurs" by Cho. Other female acts have been known to use the phrase, such as Fergie on her track "London Bridge" (2006), and Nelly Furtado in "Maneater" (2006). In an interview with MTV News, Cho retracted her earlier comments, and expressed how if used in song, and by a female then it wouldn't be offensive: "I don't mind it when it's used in songs, like when women use it," Cho continued. "Fergie uses it, that doesn't bother me. But when it's shouted in the street and they don't wait to hear the response? What if I was actually going to go, 'Oh, OK'? They never stick around to hear the answer."

== Critical reception ==
Professional ratings
Review scores
Source	Rating
BBC Radio 1	3/5 stars
Blender	4/5 stars
The Irish Times	3/5 stars

"Pure and utter joy is this one, which is most reminiscent of the lovely 'Mimi' outtake 'When I Feel It'. Except this one’s, like, 10 times better. The chorus of DeBarge's 'Stay With Me' is the foundation of this track (as opposed to the verses, which provided the foundation for the single remix of Biggie's 'One More Chance' and Ashanti's 'Foolish', among tracks). However, the sample sounds more weathered, and overall, the track comes off as a '60s throwback rather than an '80s one. One hundred percent feel-good and packing in a killer breakdown and conclusion that’s a wall of Mariah voices, this was the first song that felt like the work of unstoppable pop genius."

— Brian Hiatt, VH1.

"I'll Be Lovin' U Long Time" received generally positive reviews from music critics. Many complimented the song's production and incorporation of the "Stay with Me" sample, while others were unimpressed with the chorus in general. Chuck Taylor of Billboard assured the song would endure strong success and radio appeal, and complimented its overall production, as well as Carey's voice: "[It's] a playful, beach-befitting groove, featuring a bright sample from DeBarge's "Stay With Me," lushly woven vocals and Carey's highs doting on fans with her sonic signature." The Republican's Kevin O'Hare claimed the song would be "destined for hits-ville", while Jennifer Vineyard from MTV News described it as a "joyful romp". Similarly, the song was described as a "party jam" by Julien Bittencourt from The Day, and "a fun, flirty tease" from Foster's Daily Democrat's Nekesa Mumbi Moody. Cathy Rose A. Garcia from The Korea Times complimented the song's "laid back R&B vibe", and felt the song was easily one of the album's best cuts. Digital Spy's Nick Levine called "I'll Be Lovin' U Long Time" a "safe-but-classy number", while aside from an "unfortunate title and chorus", Gregg Shapiro of Bay Area Reporter said it "virtually glows".

In a separate review for the song, Levine rated it three out of five stars, and wrote "in spite of its predictability, 'I'll Be Lovin' U Long Time' still makes for a satisfying listen, sounding classy, effortless and as summery as a glass of rosé in the garden after a work." Journalist for the Norwegian Broadcasting Corporation (NRK), Svein Terje Torvik described the song as "One of the album's best cuts", while Fox News blogger Roger Friedman wrote "its just enough of a new twist to create the most elusive thing of all: a radio smash. Allmusic critic Stephen Thomas Erlewine chose the song as one of his "top picks" from E=MC², and wrote "it has a lightness that so much of the album lacks." Richard Cromelin from the Los Angeles Times highlighted Carey's unadorned and raw form of singing in the song, writing "her singing is so direct, understated and unglamorous it's almost shocking -- like seeing a diva without makeup." Margeauz Watsman from Entertainment Weekly called the song a "dance-floor anthem", while PopMatters Evan Sawdey described it as "certainly worthy of some greatest-hits canonization". Slant Magazine editor Sal Cinquemani felt "I'll Be Lovin' U Long Time" was a "stroke of genius", and wrote "[It] sounds like a hyperventilating cross between a graduation anthem and an early-'80s family sitcom theme song. Listening to it, I felt face to face with a couple of silver spoons: one heroin, the other grape jelly."

== Commercial performance ==
"I'll Be Lovin' U Long Time" debuted at number 90 on the Billboard Hot 100 on July 18, 2008. In its second week, the song leapt twenty-one places, coming in at number sixty-nine, before eventually peaking at number fifty-eight. The song debuted at number sixty-two on the Billboard Hot R&B/Hip-Hop Songs, Carey's 45th career entry on that chart, and has since peaked at number thirty-six. Similarly, it peaked at number thirty-seven on the Hot R&B/Hip-Hop Airplay chart. The song peaked at number forty-three on the Hot 100 Airplay. "I'll Be Lovin' U Long Time" debuted at number eighty-seven on the Canadian Hot 100, rising to number sixty-nine in its second week and eventually peaking at 22. The song remained on the chart for a total of fourteen weeks.

Though not charting on the main single chart, the song managed to peak at number forty-one on the New Zealand Airplay Chart during the week of August 3, 2008. On the Japan Hot 100, the song peaked at number twenty-seven, and stayed only six weeks within the chart. On the Slovak Singles Chart, "I'll Be Lovin' U Long Time" charted for a total of eight weeks, and peaked at number thirty-nine. The song debuted at number eighty-four on the UK Singles Chart due to digital sales, since it was only released as a promo single.

== Remix ==
The songs' official remix features American rapper T.I. The remix was produced by Carey and DJ Toomp, and was released for digital download on July 1, 2008, the same day as the original version of the song. T.I. has one verse in the song, that is found after Carey's second chorus, prior to the song's bridge. On July 11, 2008, it was announced that the song would be featured in a remix contest, set to begin on July 15, 2008. Indaba Music said that the song's music stems would be available on its website for remixers to use; the winner would receive $5,000 as prize with the chance for the remix to be officially released. Carey's manager Mark Sudack described the point of the competition, "Mariah is the queen of the remix, this contest is a way for her to continue being a pioneer in the remix world, potentially finding a new sound, a new power, a new energy in the online space, as opposed to just the go-to producers of the moment." The competition received over 1,200 entries, with the winners being The Progressions from Riverside, California.

== Music video ==
After her promotional activities ended in Japan, Carey flew to Hawaii for a three-day music video shoot from June 8–10, 2008. The video was directed by Chris Applebaum and premiered on BET's 106 & Park on July 3, 2008, at 6:00pm ET/PT and on Yahoo! Music at midnight on the same day. It later appeared on Total Request Live (TRL) on July 7, 2008. Aside from the video's original version, the remix also featured an accompanying video, with some additional scenes from T.I. Some of the scenes were filmed on the beaches of Hawaii, while some of the smaller parts were shot in Sea life park. According to several reports, Carey was seriously injured on the set of the video during shooting on June 9. Carey's representative quickly denied the allegation, and said "She was so excited to be shooting in Hawaii. She wanted all her friends to come down and be a part of the shoot."

The music video begins with several scenes interspersing, starting with Carey underwater, while holding onto a dolphins fin, as well as Carey lying on a beach at night in a bikini. As the song's introduction plays, scenes of the Hawaii beaches are shown, as well as close-up glimpses of T.I. Carey then is shown inside a small cabana, singing to the camera and enjoying herself at a small party. Similar scenes of Carey in a gold bikini are shown, as well as more scenes of Hawaiian landscape. By the second verse, Carey, now in a black bikini, is shown at the bottom of a ravine by the beach staring at the sun, then altering to scenes of the party once more. As T.I.'s verse starts, he's shown behind a waterfall, in the midst of shrubbery outside, where Mariah then appears sitting in a large body of clear water with golden sand. She then lies in the water, as the scene then switches to her underwater with the dolphin again.

== Live performances ==
Following the song's release in Japan, Carey performed "I'll Be Lovin' U Long Time" live at the 2008 MTV Video Music Awards Japan on June 2. The song was also the theme song for the telecast of the Japanese baseball match Carey attended on May 28, 2008. On July 31, 2008, Carey performed a free concert at the Hollywood and Highland Center shopping mall in Los Angeles, California in front of over 5,000 fans. The concert was filmed and presented on Jimmy Kimmel Live!, as part of Samsung AT&T Summer Krush concert series. She performed five songs, beginning with "I'll Be Lovin' U Long Time" as a mash-up with "Touch My Body", and her previous songs, "Shake It Off" and "We Belong Together" from The Emancipation of Mimi (2005). As the last song on the short set-list, Carey was joined on stage by Jeezy for a live rendition of "Side Effects". On August 8, 2008, Carey performed a mash-up of the song at the 2008 Teen Choice Awards. She began with "I'll Be Lovin' U Long Time", and worked into the bridge of "Touch My Body", before reverting to the former song. The performance garnered a standing ovation from the audience and several notable celebrities, notably Will Smith, Fergie, Chris Brown and Jerry O'Connell. During the final scene of You Don't Mess with the Zohan, a film in which Carey was featured as a cameo appearance, the song was played and included on the film's soundtrack.

== Formats and track listings ==
European 12" Single

1. "I'll Be Lovin' U Long Time" (Album Version) — 3:09
2. "I'll Be Lovin' U Long Time" (Remix feat. T.I.) — 3:50
3. "I'll Be Lovin' U Long Time" (Instrumental) — 3:09

European Promo Single

1. "I'll Be Lovin' U Long Time" (Album Version) — 3:09
2. "I'll Be Lovin' U Long Time" (Remix feat. T.I.) — 3:50
3. "I'll Be Lovin' U Long Time" (Instrumental) — 3:09

UK Promo single

1. "I'll Be Lovin' U Long Time" (Album Version) — 3:09

US 12" Single

1. "I'll Be Lovin' U Long Time" (Remix feat. T.I.) — 3:50
2. "I'll Be Lovin' U Long Time" (Album Version) — 3:09
3. "I'll Be Lovin' U Long Time" (Instrumental) — 3:09

== Credits and personnel ==
Credits for E=MC² adapted from the album's liner notes.

- Mariah Carey – songwriting, producer, vocals, background vocals
- Aldrin Davis – songwriting, producer
- Crystal Johnson – songwriting, background vocals
- Clifford Harris – songwriting
- Mark DeBarge – songwriting
- Etterlene Jordan – songwriting
- Phil Tan – audio mixing
- Josh Houghkirk – audio mixing
- Bernie Grundman – mastering

== Charts ==
=== Weekly charts ===
Weekly chart performance for "I'll Be Lovin' U Long Time"
Chart (2008)	Peak position
Canada Hot 100 (Billboard)	69
Canada CHR/Top 40 (Billboard)	24
Canada Hot AC (Billboard)	43
Japan (Japan Hot 100)	27
Netherlands (Dutch Top 40 Tipparade)	9
New Zealand Urban Radio (RadioScope) featuring T.I.	5
Slovakia Airplay (ČNS IFPI)	39
UK Singles (Official Charts)	84
UK Pop Club (Music Week)	6
UK Urban Club (Music Week)	5
US Billboard Hot 100	58
US Hot R&B/Hip-Hop Songs (Billboard)	36
US Pop Airplay (Billboard)	27
US Pop 100 (Billboard)	50
US Rhythmic Airplay (Billboard)	16
Venezuela Anglo (Record Report)	14

=== Year-end charts ===
Year-end chart performance for "I'll Be Lovin' U Long Time"
Chart (2008)	Position
US Rhythmic (Billboard)	88

== Release history ==
Release dates and formats for "I'll Be Lovin' U Long Time"
Region	Date	Format(s)	Version(s)	Label(s)	Ref.
United States	July 1, 2008	Contemporary hit radio	Original	Island	
United States	July 1, 2008	Digital download; rhythmic contemporary radio	Remix	Island	
United States	August 12, 2008	12-inch vinyl	Original; remix	Island	
Various	February 5, 2021	Digital download; streaming (EP)	Various	Universal Music	
