= Roger Friedman =

American journalist

Roger Dattyres Friedman
- Born: June 11, 1957 (age 69)
- Occupations: Journalist and gossip blogger

Roger Dattyres Friedman (born June 11, 1957) is an American journalist and gossip blogger. Friedman wrote the FOX411 news column on Fox News between 1999 and 2009. He now writes Showbiz411, an entertainment news and film review blog.

== Early life and career ==
Friedman is the son of Arthur and Rosalind Friedman. He attended Trumbull High School in Connecticut.

Friedman wrote the "Intelligencer" column at New York magazine in 1994 and edited the short-lived Fame, where he wrote cover stories on various stars. His articles have appeared in numerous other publications, including The New York Times, the Daily News, the New York Post, Vogue, Details, The Washington Post, and the Miami Herald.

With D. A. Pennebaker and Chris Hegedus, Friedman co-produced Only the Strong Survive, a 2002 documentary film about Memphis soul musicians, in which he also appeared. The film was shown in the Directors' Fortnight in parallel to the Cannes Film Festival. Reviewing the documentary, James Sullivan wrote for the San Francisco Chronicle: "With Friedman, the narrator and emissary, tossing questions as squishy as Jell-O and heaping praise on the performers for their unexceptional appearances on the oldies circuit, it's a wasted opportunity."

== Fox News; termination ==
Friedman worked for Fox News as a freelance gossip blogger from 1999 until he was fired in 2009. In 2002, he was criticized by Mica Rosenberg of the Jewish Telegraphic Agency for writing a review of a film [Wolverine] even though he had never seen it, but only read an advance copy of the screenplay. In 2004, New York Times reporter Sharon Waxman, whom he attacked repeatedly in his writing, opined about Friedman: "If he spent half as much time checking his facts as he did complaining about people stealing from him, there wouldn't be so many errors in his reporting!" She added, referring to Fox: "Do they hold him to journalistic standards, or does he just get to slander people with impunity?" The New York Observer reported:

Mr. Friedman ... has been a controversial figure for negative things he's written. But more often than not, he's been criticized for the positive. In the book Down and Dirty Pictures: Miramax, Sundance, and the Rise of Independent Film, Peter Biskind quoted former Miramax SVP and co-head of publicity Dennis Higgins as saying, "There's no one in the pocket like Roger. It's almost, ‘Whaddya want him to write?'"

In April 2009, Friedman was fired by Fox News after he reviewed the unfinished film X-Men Origins: Wolverine based on viewing a bootlegged copy of the movie online. The parent company of Fox News issued a statement that said:

Roger Friedman's views in no way reflect the views of News Corp ... When we advised Fox News of the facts they took immediate action, removed the post and promptly terminated Mr. Friedman ... This behavior is reprehensible and we condemn this act categorically.

When contacted, Friedman said, in contrast: "There was no action taken against me." (Friedman later told Gawker that he had not downloaded the film, but had streamed it after finding a link to it online.) Friedman's column was perceived as an endorsement of film piracy and illegal file sharing, particularly by the film's distributor, 20th Century Fox, which was then a unit of News Corporation alongside Fox News. His review of Wolverine was very favorable, including comments such as "I doubt anyone else has seen this film ... I am, in fact, amazed about how great 'Wolverine' turned out." Friedman's article was removed by Fox News.

Bruce Simmons wrote in Screen Rant: "What was Friedman thinking?" Not only was it foolish for him to review the movie, but then "he bragged" about how easy it was to find and download the pirated version. "When you work for the bank, you should not brag that you stole their money!"

In June 2009, Friedman filed a lawsuit against Fox News Network, NewsCorp America, Twentieth Century Fox, and Rupert Murdoch, claiming wrongful termination, tortious interference with his employment contract, and defamation based on statements Fox News and 20th Century Fox made after his firing. John Cook wrote in Gawker: "When you sue someone for breach of contract, aren't you supposed to actually quote from the contract? Just asking! ... [T]he complaint] ... doesn't even quote from the contract, or lay out what, precisely, it obligated Fox to do or not do relative to Friedman. Which doesn't bode well for a breach of contract claim, does it?"

== The Hollywood Reporter ==
Friedman joined The Hollywood Reporter as a senior correspondent in May 2009. Business Insider described it as a surprising and risky move. Editor Matt Goldberg at Collider questioned the hiring, writing: "You know, when you act badly at one place and everyone learns about it, I don't believe its common practice to hire you to do the same job at another place. If there's a news story about you dipping your balls in the Frosty mix at Wendy's, you don't get to work at Steak n' Shake."

In March 2010, after Friedman alleged a link between her Organic Liaison weight-loss system and the Church of Scientology, Kirstie Alley accused him of libelous statements about her company. In addition, Friedman alleged that the Organic Liaison weight loss system was a sham. That month, Friedman's employment agreement was not renewed by The Hollywood Reporter.

== Showbiz 411 ==
Showbiz 411 is Friedman's entertainment news and film review blog.

Friedman is a close friend of director Woody Allen, and is a defendant of Allen from his prior allegations. Friedman has regular annual interviews with Allen posted on his website.

On September 20, 2026, Friedman who is the founder and owner of the online tabloid, published a Showbiz411 article about rapper Macklemore following his removal from the remaining dates of Ed Sheeran's U.S. tour. Friedman characterized Macklemore as the "ultimate loser" of the controversy, declared that his "ten minutes of fame is over", and wrote that the rapper was returning to "obscurity".

Despite Friedman's declaration of Macklemore's return to obscurity, the article itself focused on the rapper's renewed chart activity. Friedman reported that Macklemore's 2024 protest song "Hind's Hall" had recently reached No. 3 on the iTunes chart before falling to No. 67, while several of his older recordings had also temporarily returned to the charts. The song was released in 2024 in support of pro-Palestinian demonstrations and was named for Hind Rajab, a five-year-old Palestinian girl killed in Gaza.

Friedman also questioned Macklemore's pledge to donate $1 million to Palestinian humanitarian organizations, writing, "which we'll believe when we see the check." The pledge had separately been reported by the Associated Press, which identified six intended recipient organizations, including Medical Aid for Palestinians, the Palestine Children's Relief Fund and UNRWA USA.
