= You're Mine (Eternal) =

Single by Mariah Carey

from the album Me. I Am Mariah... The Elusive Chanteuse
- Released: February 12, 2014
- Studio: Rapture Studios; Metrocity Studios; Jungle City Studios; Studio at the Palms
- Genre: R&B
- Length: 3:44
- Label: Def Jam
- Songwriters: Mariah Carey; Rodney "Darkchild" Jerkins
- Producers: Mariah Carey; Jerkins

Mariah Carey singles chronology
"The Art of Letting Go" (2013)	"You're Mine (Eternal)" (2014)	"You Don't Know What to Do" (2014)

Music video
- "You're Mine (Eternal)" on YouTube

"You're Mine (Eternal)" is a song by American singer-songwriter Mariah Carey included on her fourteenth studio album, Me. I Am Mariah... The Elusive Chanteuse (2014). It premiered on February 12, 2014, as the third single from the album. It was written and produced by Carey with Rodney Jerkins. An R&B song, the lyrics revolve around the singer reminiscing about a past lover. Critical response to the song was positive: Carey's breathy vocal style and use of the whistle register at the climax earned praise from critics. It also drew several comparisons to one of Carey's previous singles, "We Belong Together" (2005).

In the United States, "You're Mine (Eternal)" reached number 88 on the Billboard Hot 100 chart, but it experienced greater success on the Dance Club Songs chart, becoming her seventeenth number-one song. Elsewhere, it reached the top 20 in Hungary and on the UK R&B Chart and the top 30 in Spain.

Carey co-directed the music video with photographer Indrani, which depicted the singer as a mermaid swimming around the lakes at the El Yunque National Forest in Puerto Rico. R&B singer Trey Songz appears as a love interest in the video, and is featured on the official remix of the song, which received its own separate music video. Carey has performed the song at the BET Honors and during a performance at the Empire State Building.

== Background and release ==
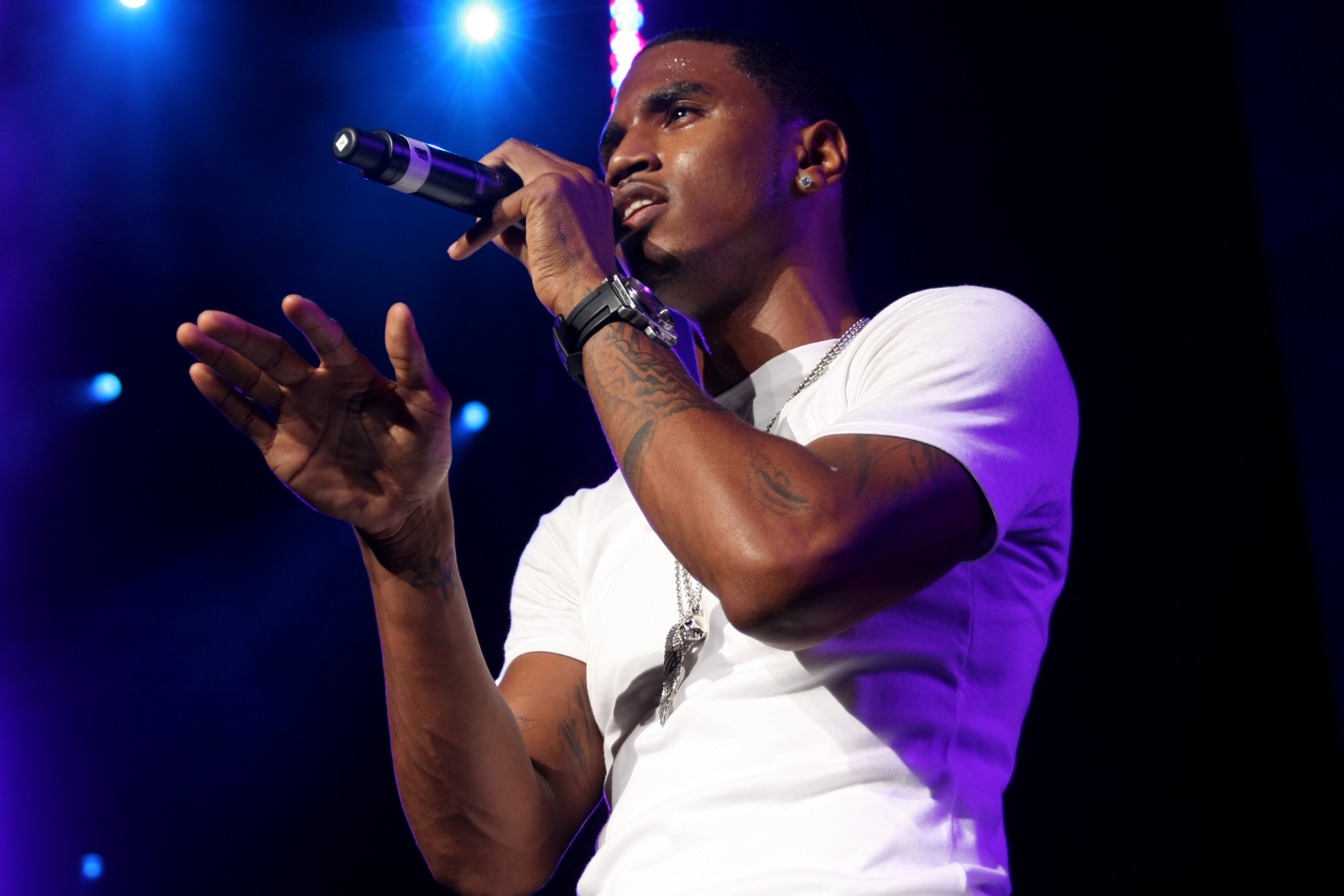
Trey Songz is featured on the urban remix version "You're Mine (Eternal)".

On December 31, 2013, Carey appeared on NBC's New Year's Eve with Carson Daly show to perform some songs. Before giving the audience some advice on love for 2014 and prior to singing "The Art of Letting Go" from Me. I Am Mariah... The Elusive Chanteuse, the singer announced that she would be releasing a new single on February 14, 2014, to coincide with Valentine's Day. On February 12, Carey released "You're Mine (Eternal)" as the album's third single. The single's artwork consists of Sweethearts, a brand of sugar candies.

In the United States, the song was released to contemporary, rhythmic, and urban adult contemporary radio stations around the country on February 18. An urban remix featuring vocals by American recording artist Trey Songz was also made available to download digitally on February 13. In an interview with MTV News, Carey praised Songz vocal ability, saying that most artists are not able to sing and rap while maintaining "a sound that's current yet also classic". Carey further released multiple dances remixes of "You're Mine (Eternal)", including the Jump Smokers Radio Remix, Jump Smokers Extended Remix, and Jermaine Dupri X Kurd Maverick Germany To Southside Remix. Additional remixes by Fedde le Grand, Gregor Salto and Funkin Matt, and Chus and Ceballos were released on March 15.

== Composition ==
"You're Mine (Eternal)" is an R&B love song written and produced by Carey and Rodney Jerkins. The song is composed in the key of D major using common time and a moderately slow feel of 75 beats per minute. Carey employs a breathy vocal style as she sings the lyric "I can't seem to live without your love". Lyrically, Carey reminisces about a past lover, singing "I can't seem to live without your love/ Suffocating here by myself/ Dying for your touch". Instrumentation consists of hypnotic, "smooth, steady" piano beat, which slowly builds to a climax with Carey hitting a whistle note for a sustained period of time at the end of the song. Music Times writer Carolyn Menyes described the "up-and-down" melodic structure as "captivating", which causes the listener to be drawn "deep into Carey's musical abyss". The urban remix featuring Songz incorporates an enhanced pop feel compared to the original, with additional drums and Auto-Tune on Songz vocals. "You're Mine" garnered comparisons to one of Carey's previous singles "We Belong Together" (2005). While Christina Garibaldi of MTV News and Jamieson Cox of Time simply highlighted that they have similar melodic structures and vocals styles, Alexa Camp of Slant Magazine was critical of the likeness between the two songs, writing that she was disappointed to hear a "retread" of "We Belong Together" following the positively received "retro" first and second singles "#Beautiful" featuring Miguel and "The Art of Letting Go", respectively.

== Critical reception ==
"You're Mine (Eternal)" garnered a generally positive response amongst music critics. Christina Garibaldi of MTV News was complimentary of the song, praising Carey's "impressive" vocal range and specifically drawing attention to the high note that she ends the song with. Garibaldi stated that "You're Mine (Eternal)" serves as a reminder as to why Carey is "still the fiercest diva in the game". Writing for Billboard, Jason Lipshutz noted that the slow structure for the majority of the song could have made it a "sleepy" R&B song, but noted that the "inevitable" high note saves it from becoming so. Jamieson Cox of Time echoed Garibaldi's sentiments, writing "It's a gaseous, fluffy ballad that feels like a direct descendant of the song that rang in her mid-career renaissance, 2005's mega-hit 'We Belong Together': plinking piano melodies, a typically fluttering Carey vocal take, and a very similar beat. Only time will tell if 'You're Mine (Eternal)' can duplicate that song's record-breaking success".

Melinda Newman of HitFix questioned if Carey could have achieve success with the song, describing it as "breathless" and too reliant on the singer's "vocal pyrotechnics". She continued to write that the song would most probably not achieve any success on the Billboard Hot 100, but would find "some love" on the adult contemporary and R&B radio stations. Jeff Benjamin of Fuse compared the production of the song to Carey's previous singles "Always Be My Baby" (1995) and "Touch My Body" (2008). He also wrote that the "drawn-out whistle" at the end of the song was "impressive". Carolyn Menyes for Music Times felt that Songz overshadowed Carey with his vocals on the urban remix. Slant Magazine writer Alexa Camp thought that while Carey's voice sounded good, Darkchild's production was "utterly trivial". She concluded by expressing that the remix featuring Songz was "slightly more interesting".

== Chart performance ==
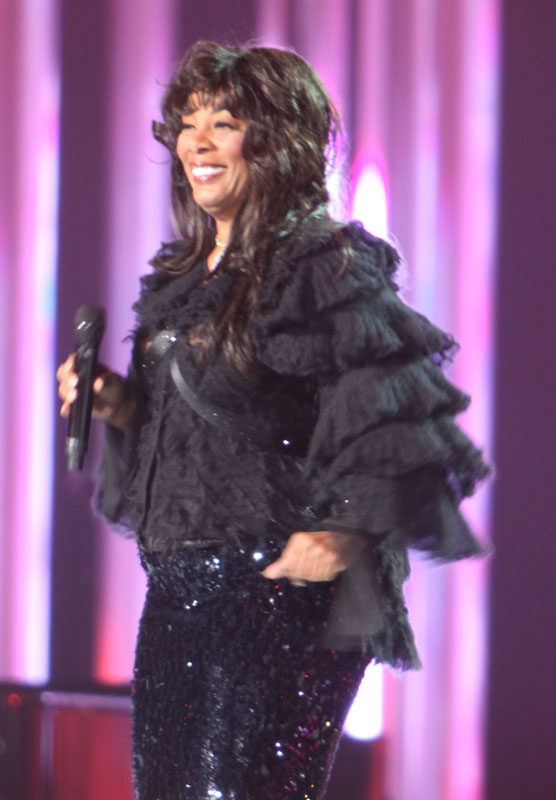
"You're Mine (Eternal)" became Carey's 17th number one on the U.S. Hot Dance Club Songs chart, tying her with Donna Summer for fifth most chart toppers.

In the United Kingdom, "You're Mine (Eternal)" spent one week on the UK Singles Chart, debuting at number 87 on February 16, 2014, just four days after being released. It fared better on the UK R&B Chart, spending one week at number 16. In Hungary, the song reached the top twenty, peaking at number 14, and the top 30 in Spain, reaching number 21. In the Flanders region of Belgium and in France, the song only managed peaked at number 49 and 96, respectively. On the Belgium Urban chart, it peaked at number 29. In Japan, "You're Mine (Eternal)" reached number 91.

In the United States, the song peaked at number 88 on the Billboard Hot 100 chart, with 32,000 digital downloads accounting for 62% of its charting points. It became Carey's 46th chart entry since her debut in 1990; it was also her first song since "Obsessed" in 2009 to chart on the Hot 100 which was neither a festive/holiday song nor a collaboration nor a cover song. "You're Mine (Eternal)" became her seventeenth number-one song on the Dance Club Songs chart since her 1991 single "Someday" topped the chart, placing her in joint fifth place with Donna Summer for artist with the most number-one songs. At the time, only Janet Jackson, Beyoncé (19 each), Rihanna (22) and Madonna (43) had achieved more. On the R&B charts, it peaked at number 24 on Hot R&B/Hip-Hop Songs chart, number 12 on the R&B/Hip-Hop Digital Songs chart, number 41 on the R&B/Hip-Hop Airplay chart, number 15 on the Hot R&B Songs chart. and number 20 on the Adult R&B Songs chart. On the pop charts, it reached number 26 on the Adult Contemporary chart, number 36 on the Mainstream Top 40 (Pop Songs) chart. and number 35 on the Rhythmic chart. According to Nielsen SoundScan, the song has sold 56,000 digital downloads as of April 2014. The song garnered 245 plays across all radio stations in its first day of release.

== Music video ==
Carey co-directed the music video for "You're Mine (Eternal)" with Indo-Canadian photographer Indrani at the El Yunque National Forest in Puerto Rico. The video premiered on MTV on February 12, 2014. Carey explained how she created the concept for the video and the decided to being in Ingrain to direct specific scenes in a radio interview:

I would say it was a directorial collaborative effort. We went to the rainforest and that was interesting. Part of the reason was [because] I love Puerto Rico[–it's] one of my favorite places ever and I did one of my favorite videos, 'Honey', in Puerto Rico at the El Conquistador hotel. I was involved every step of the way ... I like[d] a lot of the shots in the video ... There was a moment where I had to do an additional water sequence with no director, just myself and a camera man with an underwater camera. I was looking at the take at 5 in the morning, [they're] ready to kill me. But if we didn't have those shots there wouldn't be anything to cut away to, except me.

Scenes of the music video include Carey sitting beside a river in the forest covered in gold glitter, sitting in front of waterfalls and tropical wildlife, and imitating a mermaid by swimming underwater while wearing an evening gown. The remix video with Songz premiered two days later on Valentine's Day on BET's 106 & Park. Songz appears in both versions of the video, whereby he is seen modelling shirtless at a photoshoot, but only performs his verses in the remix video. Carey praised Songz for bringing something artistically different to the videos.

== Live performances ==
Carey performed "You're Mine (Eternal)" at the BET Honors in Washington, D.C., on February 8, 2014; the performance aired on February 24. On February 13, 2014, Carey performed at the lighting up of the Empire State Building in pink and red; she appeared with three couples who won a contest that gave them the opportunity to get married at the top of the building on Valentine's Day.

== Formats and versions ==
Digital Download

1. "You're Mine (Eternal)" – 3:44

Digital Download - Urban Remix

1. "You're Mine (Eternal)" [featuring Trey Songz] – 4:15

Streaming - Dance Remixes

1. "You're Mine (Eternal)" [Jermaine Dupri × Kurd Maverick Germany To Southside Remix] – 5:25
2. "You're Mine (Eternal)" [Jermaine Dupri × Kurd Maverick Germany To Southside Remix Edit] – 3:27
3. "You're Mine (Eternal)" [Jump Smokers Extended Remix] – 4:07
4. "You're Mine (Eternal)" [Jump Smokers Radio Edit] – 3:39
5. "You're Mine (Eternal)" [Fedde le Grand Main Mix] – 5:39
6. "You're Mine (Eternal)" [Gregor Salto and Funkin' Matt Main Mix] – 4:34
7. "You're Mine (Eternal)" [Chus & Ceballos Remix] – 7:01

== Credits and personnel ==
Recording

- Recorded at Rapture Studios, Bel Air, CA; Metrocity Studios, New York, NY; Jungle City Studios, New York, NY; Studio at the Palms, Las Vegas, NV.
- Mixed at Ninja Beat Club, Atlanta, GA

Personnel

- Songwriting – Mariah Carey, Rodney Jerkins
- Production – Mariah Carey, Rodney "Darkchild" Jerkins
- Recording – Brian Garten, Matt Champlin, Greg Morgan
- Assistant recording – Keith Parry, Rob Katz
- Mixing – Phil Tan
- Assistant mixing – Daniela Rivera
- Background vocals – Mariah Carey

Credits adapted from the liner notes of Me. I Am Mariah... The Elusive Chanteuse.

== Charts ==
=== Weekly charts ===
Chart (2014)	Peak position
Belgium (Ultratip Flanders)	49
Belgium Urban (Ultratop Flanders)	29
France (SNEP)	96
Hong Kong (Metro Radio)	14
Italy (FIMI)	67
Japan Hot 100 (Billboard)	91
Hungary (MAHASZ)	14
South Korea International (Circle)	91
South Korea International (Circle) Remix with Trey Songz	32
Spain (PROMUSICAE)	21
Sweden (DigiListan)	50
UK Singles (Official Charts)	87
UK R&B (OCC)	16
UK Urban Club (Music Week)	2
US Billboard Hot 100	88
US Adult Contemporary (Billboard)	26
US Dance Club Songs (Billboard)	1
US Hot R&B/Hip-Hop Songs (Billboard)	24
US Pop Airplay (Billboard)	36
US Rhythmic Airplay (Billboard)	35

=== Year-end charts ===
Chart (2014)	Position
Taiwan (Hito Radio)	54
US Dance Club Songs (Billboard)	25

== See also ==
- List of number-one dance singles of 2014 (U.S.)
- Artists with the most number-ones on the U.S. dance chart
