= You Don't Know What to Do =

Single by Mariah Carey featuring Wale

from the album Me. I Am Mariah... The Elusive Chanteuse
- Released: June 30, 2014
- Studio: Rapture Studios; Metrocity Studios; Studio at the Palms; Capital Studios
- Genre: Disco
- Length: 4:46
- Label: Def Jam
- Songwriters: Mariah Carey; Jermaine Dupri; Bryan-Michael Cox; Olubowale Akintimehin; Patrick Adams; Terri Gonzalez
- Producers: Carey; Dupri; Cox

Mariah Carey singles chronology
"You're Mine (Eternal)" (2014)	"You Don't Know What to Do" (2014)	"Infinity" (2015)

Wale singles chronology
"Clappers" (2013)	"You Don't Know What to Do" (2014)	"Don't Shoot" (2014)

Audio video
- "You Don't Know What to Do" on YouTube

"You Don't Know What to Do" is a song by American singer-songwriter Mariah Carey included on her fourteenth studio album, Me. I Am Mariah... The Elusive Chanteuse (2014), and features rapper Wale. The track was released on June 30, 2014, as the fourth and final single from the album, becoming Carey's final single with her then-label Def Jam, and its parent company Universal Music Group to which she signed in 2002, before returning to Sony Music the following year. It was written by Wale, Carey, Jermaine Dupri and Bryan-Michael Cox, with production helmed by the latter two. The song contains an interpolation of "I'm Caught Up in a One Night Affair" written by Patrick Adams and Terri Gonzalez, both of whom received songwriting credits as a result. The single's artwork caused controversy when the media criticised Carey for photoshopping and re-using images of herself. Carey herself later expressed her discontent on the matter, stating that she had no knowledge of the single's artwork until it was released.

A disco revival song, the lyrics are about Carey being dissatisfied by her lover's failed attempts at romancing her. Despite being serviced to urban and rhythmic radio, the song failed to enter any US charts; Belgium, Russia and South Korea were the only territories where the song charted, peaking at number 14 on its Ultratip chart in the Wallonian region, and numbers 73 and 152 in South Korea and Russia, respectively. "You Don't Know What to Do" garnered critical acclaim amongst music critics: many complimented the disco revival and throwback style, calling it the best track on the album, and compared it to the works of Jocelyn Brown, Daft Punk, Chic and post-revivalist songs produced Pharrell Williams. Carey and Wale performed the song for the first time on the Today show in the United States.

== Background and release ==
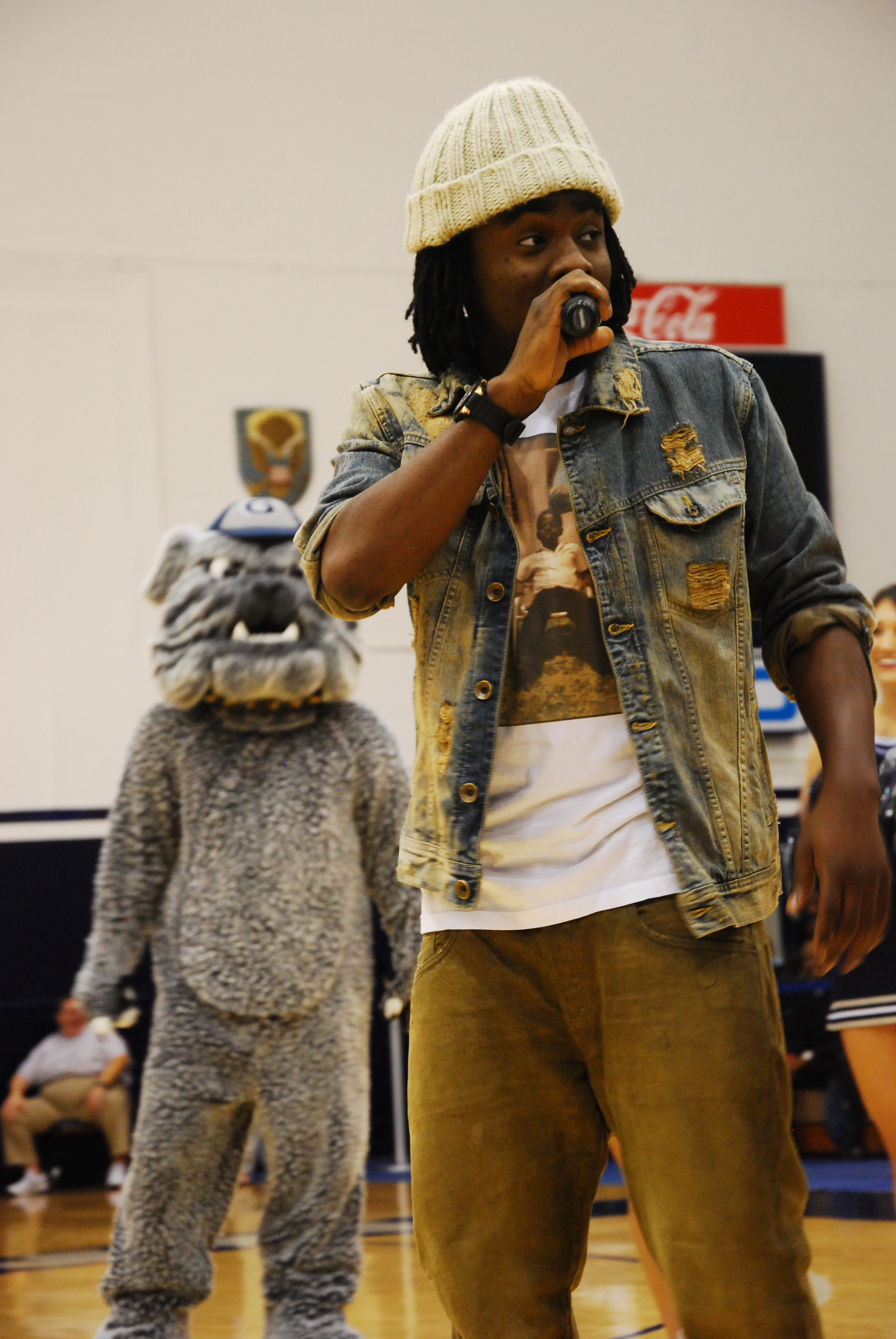
American rapper Wale features on "You Don't Know What to Do".

"You Don't Know What to Do" was written by Carey, Jermaine Dupri and Bryan-Michael Cox, with featured artist Wale. The song interpolates a song called "I'm Caught Up in a One Night Affair", written by Patrick Adams and Terri Gonzalez and originally performed by Inner Life in 1979. Adams and Gonzalez are credited as songwriters as a result. In August 2012, Cox revealed that he, Carey and Dupri had started working on Carey's then untitled fourteenth studio album, later revealed to be Me. I Am Mariah... The Elusive Chanteuse, before the singer became pregnant with twins in 2010, and then resumed working on the project after she gave birth in 2011. "She was committed to making it before she got pregnant. Then she got pregnant and she took the time off. Then after she came back, we started really vibing again and we picked up right where we left off. I just feel like between Jermaine, myself and her, we came up with a few things that [are] really, really a solid body of work".

In August 2013, Wale revealed that he had been in the studio with Carey, posting the message "Mariah x Wale x JD = coming soon" on his Twitter account. Then, on May 16, 2014, Carey and Wale premiered their collaboration, revealed to be called "You Don't Know What to Do", live during a mini-concert for Today held by Carey. Following the performance, Carey premiered the studio version on May 19 on The Russ Parr Morning Show radio show. A solo version which omits Wale's rap verses was later released in June 2014. The song was serviced to urban contemporary radio on June 30, 2014, and rhythmic contemporary radio on July 1, 2014, as the third single to be released from the album.

=== Artwork controversy ===
When Carey released "You Don't Know What to Do" as single fans noticed that its accompanying single artwork looked odd. It was later revealed that the single artwork was a cropped version of the album cover for Me. I Am Mariah... The Elusive Chanteuse, whereby her head had been swapped for another image in favor of one which was forward-facing, as well as an edited background. Various media outlets criticized Carey for continuing to heavily airbrush and "recycle" images of herself. In response, Carey expressed her discontent on Twitter, stating she had nothing to do with the selection of the single's artwork and in turn asked for fans to send in their artwork designs as alternatives, ending the message with "'cause at this point IDKWTD!", an abbreviation of the song's title.

== Composition and lyrics ==
"You Don't Know What to Do" is a disco revival song with elements of gospel, pop and R&B styles. It lasts for a duration of four minutes and 46 seconds. Several critics highlighted the track as following in the recent disco revivalism footsteps of Daft Punk, Justin Timberlake and posthumous Michael Jackson material. The song begins with Carey singing about how she is in a dilemma as to whether or not she wishes to stay in a relationship with her lover, as he is no longer capable of romancing her. In response, Wale raps about how he is trying to woo her and is asking for a second chance. Carey then decides that it has been too long that Wale has not loved her for, and feels liberated for letting him go. Kenneth Partridge of Billboard likened the string arrangement to Chic's 1979 single "Good Times". Pitchfork Media writer Jordan Sargent compared "You Don't Know What to Do" to Carey's previous singles "Fantasy" (1995) and "Heartbreaker" (1999), but noted that it felt like a "logical extension of post-Pharrell disco revivalism". Christina Lee for Idolator thought that the 70s disco feel embodied Daft Punk's 2013 single, "Get Lucky".

== Reception ==
=== Critical reception ===
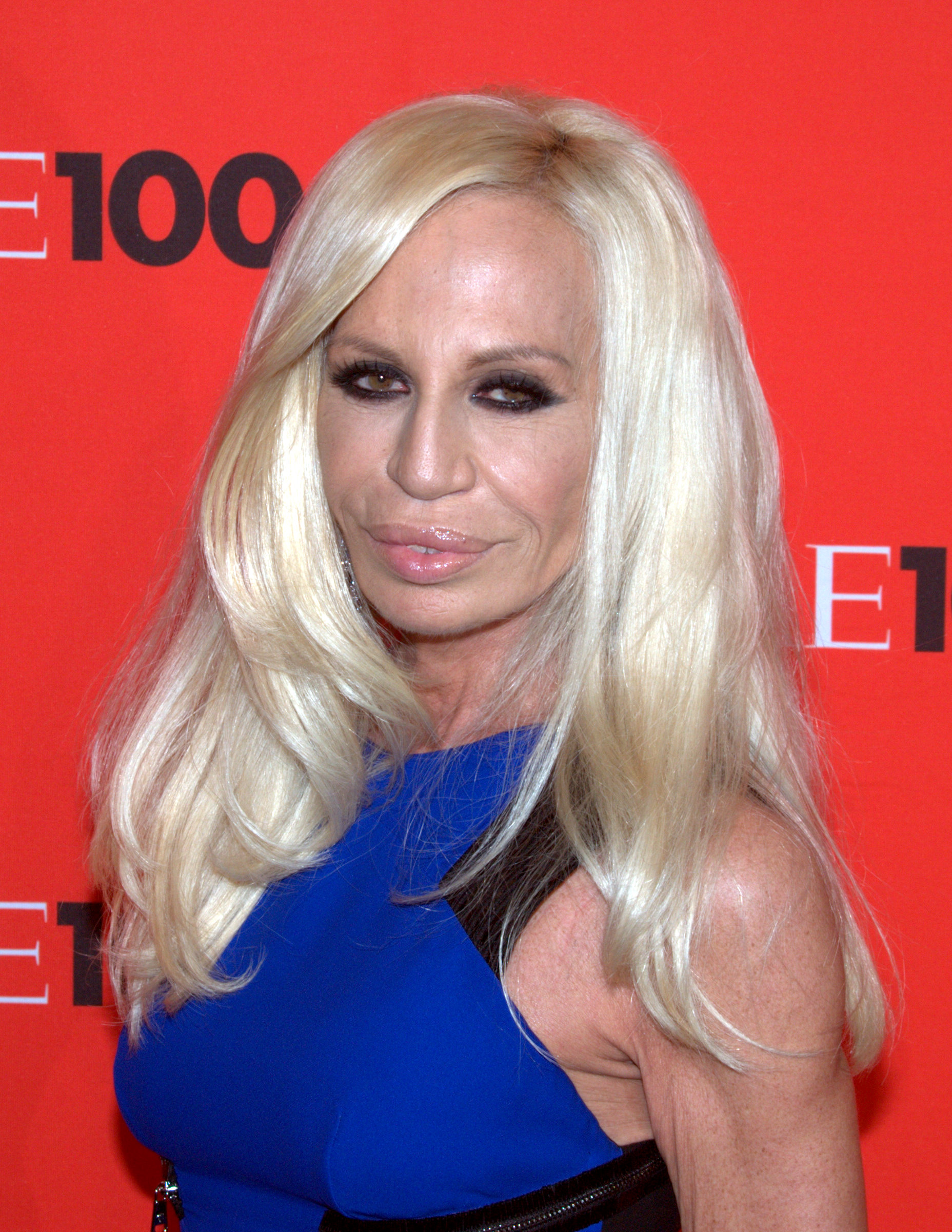
Fashion designer Donatella Versace described Carey and Wale's collaboration as "poetry".

PopMatters writer Devone Jones described the song as "the most energetic track" on the album, and continued to write that the "skillful" lyrics allow Carey to perform "genuine harmonies" which are reminiscent of seventies dance songs. Both Andy Kellman of AllMusic and Eric Henderson for Slant Magazine noted that Carey appeared to be channeling American dance singer Jocelyn Brown, with the former writer that she sounded like Brown more prominently in the intro, while the latter described "You Don't Know What to Do" as a "stunning" tribute to Brown's 1984 single "Somebody Else's Guy". Henderson continued to write that "You Don't Know What to Do", along with another album track called "Meteorite", are two of Carey's "most serious-minded performances" on the album, further describing them as "galaxies away" from her 2008 single "I'll Be Lovin' U Long Time".

Billboard writer Kenneth Partridge complimented the song for its dance appeal, adding that the only thing missing was a cameo from Nile Rodgers. Melinda Newman of HitFix praised the song's "playful" sentiment, writing that it was the best song that had been released from Me. I Am Mariah... The Elusive Chanteuse so far. Entertainment Weekly writer Melissa Maerz complimented the interpolation of "I'm Caught Up in a One Night Affair", describing it as "nostalgic", and further stated that Carey embodies the "bravado" of American singer Jennifer Holliday in the broadway musical Dreamgirls. Digital Spy's Lewis Corner praised Dupri for producing a piano "disco stormer" with throwback appeal. Mike Wass of Idolator thought that "You Don't Know What to Do" would have been worthy of being recorded by American disco singer Donna Summer.

Jordan Sargent of Pitchfork Media praised its composition and noted that the disco and gospel genres are where middle-aged woman can "thrive", whereby Carey "fits in unsurprisingly well". He was, however, critical of the decision to include Wale on the song. Similarly, Aisha Harris of Slate Magazine praised the song's production and Carey's vocals too, but also thought that Wale's rap verses were not required. Conversely, fashion designer Donatella Versace, a friend of Carey's, told Vogue that she thought Carey's singing and Wale's rapping complimented each other on the song, describing it as "poetry", and that it made her want to get up and dance "all summer".

=== Chart performance ===
"You Don't Know What to Do" was a commercial failure and failed to enter any US chart. However, it did manage to debut at number 45 on the Belgium chart, in the region of Wallonia on August 2, 2014, but failed to enter the main Ultratop 50 chart. The song broke into the top 40 the following week, charting at number 36. It peaked at number 14 on September 6, spending six weeks on the chart in total. The song also debuted at number 73 in South Korea, on the main Digital Chart, for the week ending May 31, 2014. It also debuted at number two on the International Download Chart, with sales of 32,945 units. In its second week, the song fell to number seven with sales of 11,991 units, and again to number 11 in its third week with sales of 7,326 units. It also charted in Russia, peaking at number 152.

== Live performance ==
Carey and Wale performed "You Don't Know What to Do" on the Today show on May 16, 2014. The performance also included renditions of Carey's previous singles "Always Be My Baby" (1996) and "Touch My Body" (2008).

Carey started performing the song for the first time after 5 years on Caution World Tour in 2019.

== Credits and personnel ==
Credits adapted from the liner notes of Me. I Am Mariah... The Elusive Chanteuse.

Recording

- Recorded at Rapture Studios, Bel Air, CA; Metrocity Studios, New York, NY; Studio at the Palms, Las Vegas, NV; Capital Studios, Hollywood, CA.

Sampling credits

- Contains an interpolation of "I'm Caught Up in a One Night Love Affair", written by Patrick Adams and Terri Gonzalez.

Personnel

- Songwriting – Mariah Carey, Jermaine Dupri, Bryan-Michael Cox, Olubowale Akintimehin, Patrick Adams, Terri Gonzalez
- Production – Mariah Carey, Jermaine Dupri, Bryan-Michael Cox
- Recording – Brian Garten, John Horesco, Jess Sutcliffe
- Assistant recording – Daniela Rivera
- Background vocals – Mariah Carey
- String arrangement and conduction – Larry Gold
- Violins – Joel Derouin, Mario Deleon, Tammy Hatwan, Marisa Kuney, Songa Lee, Serena McKinney, Grace Oh, Bob Peterson, Kathleen Sloan, Jenny Takamatsu, Ina Veli, Josefina Vegara
- Violas – Caroline Buckman, Lauren Chipman, Kaila Potts, Mike Whitson
- Cellos – Vanessa Freebairn-Smith, Julie Jung, Giovanna Clayton

== Charts ==
=== Weekly charts ===
Chart (2014)	Peak position
Belgium (Ultratip Bubbling Under Wallonia)	14
CIS Airplay (TopHit)	152
South Korea (Circle)	73

== Release history ==
Country	Date	Format	Label
United States	June 30, 2014	Urban contemporary radio	Def Jam
United States	July 1, 2014	Rhythmic contemporary radio	Def Jam
