= The Art of Letting Go =

Single by Mariah Carey

from the album Me. I Am Mariah... The Elusive Chanteuse (Deluxe)
- Released: November 11, 2013
- Studio: Capitol Studios (Los Angeles, CA); Jungle City Studios (New York, NY); Metrocity Studios (New York, NY); Pon de Islands Studios (Antigua and Barbuda); Rapture Studios (Bel Air, CA); RMS Studios (Los Angeles, CA); Sunset Sound (Hollywood, CA)
- Genre: R&B; gospel
- Length: 3:44
- Label: Island; Def Jam
- Songwriters: Mariah Carey; Rodney "Darkchild" Jerkins
- Producers: Mariah Carey; Rodney Jerkins

Mariah Carey singles chronology
"#Beautiful" (2013)	"The Art of Letting Go" (2013)	"You're Mine (Eternal)" (2014)

Audio video
- "The Art of Letting Go" on YouTube

"The Art of Letting Go" is a song by American singer-songwriter Mariah Carey for the deluxe version of her fourteenth studio album, Me. I Am Mariah... The Elusive Chanteuse (2014). It was written and produced by Carey and Rodney "Darkchild" Jerkins, and premiered via Facebook on November 11, 2013, as the second single from the album, following a digital release the same day worldwide. Jermaine Dupri, Carey's longtime collaborator and her then-manager, had the idea to premiere the song via Facebook to attract her die hard fans, however, Carey faced problems when an unmastered version of the song was uploaded in place of its final mix, leading the singer to premiere the intended version hours later with an apology and explanation.

"The Art of Letting Go" is an orchestral old-school R&B song, with influences of gospel music, having piano, strings and guitar as its main instrumentation. Lyrically, the song talks about the art and the power of letting go of people and things that are not good in our lives, which can be hurtful and difficult, but extremely necessary. The song received largely positive reviews from music critics, who compared the song to her debut single, "Vision of Love" (1990), while also praising its minimalistic production and her vocals towards the end of the song. It failed to impact the charts, reaching the low regions of the countries it charted.

== Background and release ==
"The Art of Letting Go" was originally the title for Carey's fourteenth studio album, which was scheduled to be released during the spring of 2014, as well as being the second single, following statements that she wasn't ready to release the album in 2013 since she didn't want to "exclude meaningful songs", as well as sustaining an injury to her shoulder while recording the music video for the remix of "#Beautiful", which led her to spend time in recovery. On October 28, 2013, Carey uploaded the single artwork on her Instagram, also revealing that the song was going to premiere first on Facebook. The artwork shows Carey kneeling down on a beach in front of a sunset. Sam Lanksy on Idolator commanded the sexiness of Carey's emancipated body, commenting: [...]" Wearing a swimsuit thing on a beach against a golden sunset, sporting tousled waves, her body is emancipated — just like her spirit".

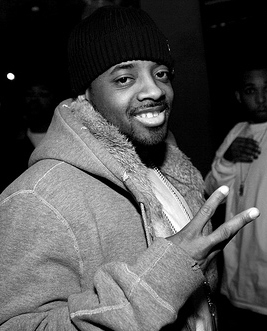
Carey's then-manager and longtime friend Jermaine Dupri had the idea of release the song on Facebook.

On November 11, 2013, "The Art of Letting Go" was premiered via Carey's Facebook account. The decision to release it on the social networking was done by Carey's longtime collaborator, friend, and then-new manager, Jermaine Dupri. According to Dupri, "Most artists upload their music to Facebook using SoundCloud, YouTube and Vevo, but we are the first that are giving the music through the Facebook player." He claimed that the release was not to be considered "a ploy against traditional distribution routes", but "an exercise to do something that none of those other outlets can do, basically." He also explained that many fans of the singer are old school and that they "need to be exposed to the song on radio first to want to support her, so while the Facebook premiere will attract a lot of die hard fans, many more fans will only be exposed to Mariah by airplay and that is what will drive up her iTunes position."

Carey stated that she wanted to share the song on Facebook since the music industry is taking advantage of the social media where the fans can globally listen to the song at once despite the time difference. She further added: "The global aspect and the immediate access and ability to interact with my fans during the song premiere are the main reasons we're doing this. The fact that Facebook is global, that is super important to me." She later extended her explanation, stating:

"Facebook is global, and I always have to keep in mind that my fans are all over the world. I wanted to make sure everybody was able to hear the song at the same time. To interact with the fans while they're listening to the song for the first time, it makes me happy. I like to see what my true fans are feeling. ... And I know this is a song that is from my heart, completely.

After its release on Facebook, Carey faced problems with the uploaded version of the song. An unmastered, old mix of "The Art of Letting Go" was premiered instead of the proper and mastered version, which led the singer to explain on the social media: "A mistake was made by a brand new sound engineer whose only task was to press the space bar and upload the song to Facebook, while [we] partied while listening to the properly mixed & mastered version of ‘The Art of Letting Go’ on repeat from my iPod on my home speakers, [...] [t]here was no reason for me to wonder if the final mix we were listening to in that room together was different than what you were listening to!" She also went on to explain that both versions were not crucially different, noting: "Like I always say, I am involved with every record I make, from the inception to the completion of the song. Every nuance of the beat or vocal matters to me. Even if the differences may seem slight to you, I had put time, effort and emotions into ‘The Art of Letting Go’ and the real mix is how I intended for you to hear the song."

== Composition and lyrical interpretation ==
"As a songwriter, I never like to be too totally specific, because I like people to be able to make it about their own life experiences. [But] there is an art to learning how to let go of things in your life, people in your life, things that are not good for you. Whatever the case may be."

— Mariah Carey explaining "The Art of Letting Go" lyrical meaning.

"The Art of Letting Go" was written and produced by Mariah Carey and Rodney Jerkins. It is an empowering, slow-burning, classic R&B and gospel ballad. Its main instrumentation consists in the use of the piano, strings, and guitar. It opens with a "demo-style loop" with a faux vinyl surface noise. As the song progresses, "small electronic drum keeps time as a piano riff plays alongside an orchestral string arrangement," with "small influences of jazz in the instrumentation, as the piano shuffles along to the beat," as noted by Music Times's Carolyn Menyes. It also features "a bolero-like crescendo with organ and strings," noted Brian Mansfield of USA Today. Its final chorus is "backed by a gospel choir," with the track "closing out with a long, impressive belted note." Tara Nicodemo, writing for Ryan Seacrest website, explained that "[t]he song structure is different than Mariah usually offers, but has similar qualities to her 1990 ballad, 'Vision of Love,' which gives [it] a nostalgic touch." Dupri echoed the same sentiment, describing it as "the 2014 version of 'Vision of Love', with Carey also stating, "it's certainly not an exact replica of 'Vision of Love,' [but] it has the similar starkness and not-overproduced feel of the demo of [it]."

Lyrically, "The Art of Letting Go" talks about "the ability to let go of things, people, emotions, situations, anything that has bogged you down for a long time." It offers comforting words to anyone struggling to rid themselves of a bad relationship or friend. In the beginning, she sings about "someone who once kept her in his trap before she discovered herself and broke free", with the verses: "I'm making a statement of my own opinion / Just a brief little reminder to make myself remember / I no longer live in your dominion / No." Carey stated that the lines "I hope you don’t get no ideas ’bout re-uniting baby 'cause that’s the last thing I truly need / Your audacity is too much to be believed, so go to MiMi on your contacts, press delete" were especially important for fans to pay attention to. While further discussing over its theme, Carey claimed the lyrics are extremely personal, remarking: "I wrote the lyrics so that anyone and everyone could relate to them and hopefully release anything that they need to let go of that's holding them back or bringing them down." She admitted:

"I would like to have people apply that to their lives in any way they see fit. And that's why I wrote it. It was an organic moment that happened to also be timely and very real. There couldn't be a more real moment in my life for that line on this actual day — for reasons we won't get into. But to sum it up, it's about helping someone else get through their moment, while I'm getting through mine as the writer and the performer."

The song is written in the key of D♭ major with a 12/8 time signature and a tempo of 75 beats per minute. It follows a chord progression of D♭–F–B♭m–G♭, and Carey's vocals span from B♭_{2} to A♭_{5} in the song.

== Critical reception ==
Upon its release, "The Art of Letting Go" was met with general acclaim from contemporary music critics. Mike Ayers of Rolling Stone complimented the song's overall production for "exploring loss over a smooth, orchestral production," while also commending her vocal performance, noting that "just when you think that it might be one of Carey's more controlled performances in years, she brings it home with classic Carey high notes." Erika Ramirez of Billboard complimented lyrical content describing Carey as singing after a heartbreak and she commended Carey for the vocal belts towards the end. Kyle Anderson of Entertainment Weekly compared the song as a nice throwback of "Vision of Love" as well as commending the hooked lyrics and the use of the line "Go to Mimi on your contact, press delete". Website Rap-Up acclaimed the song and the personal direction of the single, writing that "Carey soars once again with her new single." Kevin Fallon of The Daily Beast hailed the simplicity of the ballad and commended that overall synthesized production of the song, writing that "'The Art of Letting Go', is a much-needed lesson that great pop music is composed of the most basic group of ingredients—a stellar voice and straightforward orchestrations—even if it’s admittedly not the most explosive track that Carey has ever produced." Brian Mansfield of USA Today wrote the song is a "proof that Carey "could, indeed, sound captivating singing the phone book." However, he noted that "'The Art of Letting Go' is a vent disguised as a gospel ballad and has lyrics that often sound rushed and awkward."

Robert Copsey of Digital Spy awarded the song four stars out of five, commending the single title and describing it as "[a]n orchestral R&B ballad packed with Mariah-isms ('Go to Mimi on your contacts... press delete') and no major hook [that']s never going to set the charts alight, but something tells us Carey is more than aware of this." Copsey also praised her for "adopt[ing] a welcomely serene approach and stripped it back to the core basics of her earlier work: old-school soul that culminates in a stunning finale that only Mariah knows how." Both Jeff Benjamin of Fuse and Carolyn Menyes of Music Times complimented Carey's vocals, with Benjamin noting that the song has "a full-out showcase of Mariah's legendary vocals," while Menyes noted that her vocals " are high up in the mix, allowing her one-of-a-kind voice to penetrate the listener's ear." Alexa Camp of Slant Magazine noted that during the song "she shows off her less-fêted lower range throughout and takes it to church in the song's final minute. And though the lack of a discernable hook means it's unlikely to rehabilitate Mariah's former chart glory, this one was clearly intended for the lambs." Bill Lamb of About.com gave the song a rating of 4.5 out of 5 stars, praised the song's "meaningful, resonant lyrics", Carey's "powerful mid-range vocal performance" and its "simple arrangement", also noting that the song "resonates with real emotion", while also "[not] forget[ting] to include a touch of self-referential humor along the way."

== Chart performance ==
In the United States, "The Art of Letting Go" failed to enter the Billboard Hot 100 chart, but it did peak at number 46 on the Hot R&B/Hip-Hop Songs chart. It also reached number 13 on the Hot R&B Songs chart and number 15 on the Hot R&B/Hip-Hop Digital Songs chart. "The Art of Letting Go" has sold 32,000 digital downloads in the country as of February 2014.

In Australia, it peaked at number 82 on the singles chart, but fared better on the urban chart, reaching number eight. In Europe, the song performed best in Spain, reaching number 29, but charted on the lower regions of the singles charts in France and the United Kingdom, at numbers 84 and 90, respectively. In South Korea, it debuted at number 66 with digital download sales of 3,198 units upon the release of the album in May 2014.

== Live performance ==
Carey performed "The Art of Letting Go" for the second time live on NBC's New Year's Eve with Carson Daly on December 31, 2013.

== Credits and personnel ==
Recording

- Recorded at Rapture Studios, Bel Air, CA; Metrocity Studios, New York, NY; Pon de Islands Studios, Antigua; Jungle City Studios, New York City, NY; Capital Recording Studios, Hollywood, CA; Sunset Studios, Hollywood, CA; RMS Studios, Los Angeles, CA.
- Mixed at Ninja Beat Club, Atlanta, GA

Personnel

- Songwriting – Mariah Carey, Rodney Jerkins
- Production – Mariah Carey, Rodney "Darkchild" Jerkins
- Recording – Brian Garten, Matt Champlin, Greg Morgan, Gabe Veltri, Brandon Caddell, Jess Sutcliffe
- Assistant recording – Keith Parry, Chandler Harrod, Geoff Neal
- Mixing – Phil Tan
- Additional/assistant engineering – Daniela Rivera
- Background vocals – Mariah Carey, Takeytha Johnson, MaryAnn Tatum
- String arrangement and conduction – Larry Gold
- Drum programming – Rodney Jerkins
- Piano – Rodney Jerkins, Steve Undsey
- Bass – Artie Reynolds III
- Keyboards – John Flip Wilson
- Guitar – Tim Stewart
- Percussion – Matt Champlin
- Violins – Joel Derouin, Mario Deleon, Tammy Hatwan, Marisa Kuney, Songa Lee, Serena McKinney, Grace Oh, Bob Peterson, Kathleen Sloan, Jenny Takamatsu, Ina Veli, Josefina Vegara
- Violas – Caroline Buckman, Lauren Chipman, Kaila Potts, Mike Whitson
- Cellos – Vanessa Freebairn-Smith, Julie Jung, Giovanna Clayton

Credits adapted from the liner notes of Me. I Am Mariah... The Elusive Chanteuse.

== Charts ==
Chart (2013–2014)	Peak position
Australia (ARIA)	82
Australia Urban (ARIA)	8
France (SNEP)	84
Ireland (IRMA)	96
Italy (FIMI)	63
South Korea International (Circle)	7
Spain (Promusicae)	29
Sweden (DigiListan)	46
UK Singles (Official Charts)	90
US Bubbling Under Hot 100 (Billboard)	19
US Hot R&B/Hip-Hop Songs (Billboard)	46

== Release history ==
Region	Date	Format	Label
Worldwide	November 11, 2013	Facebook premiere	Island Records (US); Virgin EMI (UK); Universal Music (elsewhere)
United States	November 11, 2013	Digital download	Island Records (US); Virgin EMI (UK); Universal Music (elsewhere)
