= Betcha Gon' Know (The Prologue) =

Song by Mariah Carey

from the album Memoirs of an Imperfect Angel
- Released: 2009
- Studio: The Boom Boom Room (Burbank, California); Studio at the Palms (Las Vegas, Nevada); Honeywest Studios (New York City)
- Length: 4:00
- Label: Island
- Songwriters: Mariah Carey, Christopher Stewart, Terius Nash, James Wright
- Producers: Mariah Carey, Christopher "Tricky" Stewart, The-Dream, James "Big Jim" Wright

"Betcha Gon' Know (The Prologue)" is a song by American singer Mariah Carey from her twelfth studio album Memoirs of an Imperfect Angel (2009). It was co-written and co-produced by Carey, Christopher "Tricky" Stewart, James "Big Jim" Wright and The-Dream. The song was recorded at several recording locations, including The Boom Boom Room in Burbank, California, the Studio at the Palms in Las Vegas, Nevada and at Honeywest Studios in New York City. The lyrics revolve around the idea of outing a cheating boyfriend publicly on television, and Carey makes a reference to Oprah Winfrey and her chat show.

"Betcha Gon' Know (The Prologue)" garnered mixed responses from music critics. Sal Cinqeumani for Slant Magazine wrote that the song was "promising," however, Jon Caramanica for The New York Times criticized the song's lackluster arrangement and Carey's vocal execution. Upon the release of Memoirs of an Imperfect Angel, the song peaked at number 66 on the US Hot Digital Songs chart in October 2009, and remained on the chart for a total of two weeks.

== Background ==
After Carey finished her The Adventures of Mimi Tour (2006) in support of her tenth studio album The Emancipation of Mimi (2005), she began to work on material for her eleventh studio effort, the yet untitled E=MC² (2008). E=MC² was hailed as one of the most anticipated albums to be released in 2008, with many critics weighing their opinions on whether Carey would be able to deliver significant success, following her achievements with The Emancipation of Mimi. After the release and success of "Touch My Body", the project's lead single, subsequent singles of the album failed to garner airplay or significant charting, Island Records halted promotion of the album. Since the album's release, Carey had planned to embark on an extensive tour in support of E=MC², describing its production and direction in several interviews. When asked to describe the tour's theme, Carey explained "I'm thinking elaborate. I like elaborate. We only do substantial. That's what my jeweler says. I haven't gotten the looks in mind just yet, but we're going to figure it out soon enough." Although plans for a tour were underway, and Carey's announcement for a tour during her promotional appearance on The X Factor in the United Kingdom in November 2008, the tour was suddenly cancelled in the following month.

Because of the tour's cancellation, various media outlets circulated speculation that Carey had become pregnant, and had abandoned her plans for a tour as a result. Many reports were made claiming that Carey had been visiting a famed gynecologist's office in Los Angeles. Carey did not address those rumours until two years later on October 28, 2010, which was the same day she announced her new pregnancy; she admitted that she had indeed been pregnant during that time period in late 2008, and suffered a miscarriage. For that reason, she cancelled the tour, and lost the child only two months later. Carey later opted to record a new album, that would be released during the summer of 2009. During the later stages of the project, Carey released the title, Memoirs of an Imperfect Angel, that would serve as the singer's twelfth studio album.

== Production ==
"Betcha Gon' Know (The Prologue)" was co-written by Carey, Christopher Stewart, James Wright and Terius Nash. It was also produced by the foursome, with Stewart credited as Christopher "Tricky" Stewart, Wright as James "Big Jim" Wright and Nash as The-Dream. It is the opening song on the album, and lasts for a duration of 4 minutes exactly. As the album's opening track, Carey sing's "Welcome to a day of my life" as the first line of the song, as she begins to sing about the downfalls and shortcomings of love. According to Sal Cinqeumani for Slant Magazine, Carey sings in a taunting, schoolyard nature when she performs the lyrics "I'm gon' la-la-la-la-la-laugh."

The song's lyrical content revolves around the protagonist getting a their own back to their estranged and cheating lover publicly on TV, as Carey sings "Oprah Winfrey whole segment, for real." Becky Bain for Idolator interpretation of the lyrics were that it is from a female perspective who sings about an adulterous man. The remix featuring R. Kelly leaked in July 2011, and draws influence from R&B. In 2014, Carey announced that the remix would appear on her fourteenth studio album, Me. I Am Mariah... The Elusive Chanteuse, as a deluxe edition bonus track.

== Critical reception ==
"Betcha Gon' Know (The Prologue)" garnered mixed responses from music critics. Sal Cinquemani for Slant Magazine wrote that "Betcha Gon' Know (The Prologue)" is a "promising" song. James Reed for the Boston Globe was complimentary of the song because he felt that the first half of the track list better represented Carey, writing "halfway in, 'Memoirs' starts to sag under its own weight, and the sweetness that initially was so irresistible starts to get a little too sticky." Jon Caramanica for The New York Times was critical of the song, noting that her collaborators of choice on the album have delivered "largely listless arrangements", writing that Carey is "mumbling" on "Betcha Gon' Know (The Prologue)". He likened her singing style on the song to other tracks on the album "Ribbon" and "Insepareable", writing that "talk-singing" is usually "the preserve of far worse singers." When the "Betcha Gon' Know (The Prologue)" remix featuring R. Kelly surfaced online, Becky Bain for Idolator wrote that the "stream-of-consciousness, the various voices for multiple players, the cheating plotline" is a reworking of his series of songs entitled Trapped in the Closet (2005).

== Credits and personnel ==
Recording

- Recorded at The Boom Boom Room, Burbank, California; Studio at the Palms, Las Vegas, Nevada and Honeywest Studios, New York City.
- Mixed at Larrabee Studios in Universal City, California.

Personnel

- Songwriting – Mariah Carey, Christopher Stewart, James Wright and Terius Nash
- Production – Mariah Carey, Christopher "Tricky" Stewart, James "Big Jim" Wright and The-Dream
- Recording – Brian Garten and Brian "B-Luv" Thomas
- Recording assistant – Luis Navarro
- Mixing – Jaycen-Joshua Fowler and Dave Pencado
- Assistant mixing – Giancarlo Lino
- Keys and Hammond B3 – "Big Jim" and "Tricky" Stewart

Credits adapted from the liner notes of Memoirs of an Imperfect Angel.

== Charts ==
Upon the release of Memoirs of an Imperfect Angel, "Betcha Gon' Know (The Prologue)" debuted and peaked at number 66 on the US Hot Digital Songs chart on October 17, 2009. The song spent two weeks on the chart in total. It debuted at number three and peaked at number one on the US Bubbling Under Hot 100 Singles chart.

| Chart (2009) | Peak position |
|---|---|
| US Bubbling Under Hot 100 Singles (Billboard) | 1 |
| US Hot Digital Songs (Billboard) | 66 |

== Remix ==
Following the announcement of plans for the Angels Advocate Tour in support of Memoirs of an Imperfect Angel, Carey revealed that she was going to release a remix album of the standard edition, including new featured artists and songs from the album's recording sessions which did not make the final cut. American singer and songwriter R. Kelly was confirmed to be the featured artist on the remix of "Betcha Gon' Know (The Prologue)". Angels Advocate had been planned to be released in March 2010, but for unknown reasons was cancelled. The remix featuring R. Kelly, with the shortened title of "Betcha Gon' Know", was included as a deluxe edition bonus track on her fourteenth studio album Me. I Am Mariah... The Elusive Chanteuse, which was released on May 27, 2014. Upon the release of the album, "Betcha Gon' Know'" debuted on the South Korean International Gaon Single Chart at number 67 for the week ending May 31, 2014.
