= Me. I Am Mariah... The Elusive Chanteuse =

2014 studio album by Mariah Carey

- Standard cover

Studio album by Mariah Carey
- Released: May 27, 2014
- Recorded: 2011–2014
- Studio: See full list
- Genre: R&B
- Length: 62:42
- Label: Def Jam
- Producers: Darhyl "Hey DJ" Camper; Mariah Carey; Bryan-Michael Cox; Jermaine Dupri; Heatmyzer; Hit-Boy; Rodney "Darkchild" Jerkins; Miguel; Mike Will Made-It; Terius "The-Dream" Nash; Q-Tip; C. "Tricky" Stewart; James "Big Jim" Wright

Mariah Carey chronology
Merry Christmas II You (2010)	Me. I Am Mariah... The Elusive Chanteuse (2014)	#1 to Infinity (2015)

Singles from Me. I Am Mariah... The Elusive Chanteuse
- 1. "#Beautiful" Released: May 7, 2013; 2. "The Art of Letting Go" Released: November 11, 2013; 3. "You're Mine (Eternal)" Released: February 12, 2014; 4. "You Don't Know What to Do" Released: June 30, 2014

Me. I Am Mariah... The Elusive Chanteuse is the fourteenth studio album by American singer-songwriter Mariah Carey. The album was released on May 27, 2014, through Def Jam Recordings marking her last studio effort with the label. It features guest appearances from Nas, Miguel, Wale, and Fabolous. The deluxe edition of the album also saw appearances from Mary J. Blige and R. Kelly. Carey, Bryan Michael Cox and Jermaine Dupri served as executive producers on the album. The first half of the album's title derived from a self-portrait Carey drew as a young girl that she captioned "Me. I Am Mariah", while the latter half of the title is derived from a nickname.

Having been in development since 2011, Carey originally scheduled the album for release in 2012 under the title The Art of Letting Go. However, following the commercial failure of the single, "Triumphant (Get 'Em)", and the album's title leaking, the album was reworked and Carey recorded additional songs causing the release date to be pushed back multiple times throughout 2013 and early 2014.

Upon release, the album received generally positive reviews, and debuted at number three on the US Billboard 200, becoming her seventeenth top-ten album in the country. It also topped the US Top R&B/Hip-Hop Albums chart, and reached top 15 in various countries including the UK, Spain, Canada, Italy, Australia and New Zealand. Carey promoted the album with several media appearances alongside The Elusive Chanteuse Show. Four singles were released from the album including "#Beautiful", "The Art of Letting Go", "You're Mine (Eternal)", and "You Don't Know What to Do".

== Development ==
=== Background and recording ===
Following her thirteenth studio album Merry Christmas II You (2010) and the birth of her children in 2011, Billboard announced that Carey had begun work on a full-length fourteenth studio album. In March 2011, Carey's representative stated that Carey was going to donate royalties for an unreleased song titled "Save the Day", which she had written for her upcoming studio album, to charities that create awareness for human-rights issues. Her then-husband Nick Cannon told Billboard in May that year, that Carey had already completed a good amount of recording for the new album, teasing a new single, and confirming that the album would be inspired by her debut self-titled album and its follow-up, Emotions. In September, Carey's producer and friend Jermaine Dupri took to his social network Global14 to reveal that he was back in the studio with her working on new music.

In the April 2012 issue of Shape magazine, Carey stated: "I've started writing songs for a new album, which I hope will come out in 2012. Getting back in the studio and making music again-which I truly love doing-is the best way to end this crazy year". In August 2012, producer Bryan Michael Cox said that he had worked with Carey on the album, praising her commitment "to making it before she got pregnant", and added that after the pregnancy, "we started really vibing again and we picked up right where we left off". In September 2012, Carey was in the studio with R. Kelly. Carey also worked with DJ Clue?, Randy Jackson, Q-Tip, R. Kelly, David Morales, Loris Holland, Stevie J, James Fauntleroy, Ray Angry, Jermaine Dupri, Bryan-Michael Cox, James "Big Jim" Wright, Hit-Boy, The-Dream, Da Brat, and Rodney Jerkins. In mid-2013, she was seen in the studio on separate occasions with Mike Will Made It and Young Jeezy, Wale, and Nas. Carey stated that "I'm collaborating with a lot of my favorite people but the main thing is [that] I'm not trying to follow any particular trend, I want it to be well received. I want to stay true to myself and the music that I love and make the fans happy".

While both "Save the Day" and a cover of the jazz standard "Lullaby of Birdland" were originally set to be included on the album, Carey later released them for her compilation album of unreleased songs, The Rarities (2020).

=== Delays and release ===
In August 2012, Carey's then-manager Randy Jackson told Billboard that the album was set for release in March 2013. Carey told Ryan Seacrest in September of that year, "I want[ed] [it] to [be released] sooner, but I guess it wouldn't be ready until around January 2013, somewhere around there. I wanted to put another single out, a ballad. I love it, but I'm still writing, I'm still working. So, you never know what it's going to end up being". On August 3, 2012, Carey released the single "Triumphant (Get 'Em)", a collaboration with rappers Rick Ross and Meek Mill, which was originally intended to be the lead single for the album. The single garnered low impact both critically and commercially, and was eventually scrapped as the lead single.

In February 2013, Carey stated that she wanted to release the album as soon as possible. The album was delayed to May 2013, which soon changed to July 23, 2013. However the album was announced to be delayed again and set for release on May 6, 2014. In an interview in February 2014, Carey added that there would be songs on the album about her husband, as well as songs that she wrote specifically for her twin children. That same month, Carey announced to MTV News that she had added three new songs to the track list, one extra Hitboy record and two new remixes, and stated that she was in the process of choosing a new title for the album following it being leaked online.

In April 2014, The Island Def Jam Music Group was shuttered by Universal Music Group; Island Records and Def Jam Recordings went on to operate as separate entities, with Carey being transferred from Island to Def Jam. That same month, Carey discussed issues around the failed singles and push backs during an interview with Billboard saying that she wanted fans to hear the album as a full body of work and thus performance of individual singles was less important. Carey considered a "Beyoncé-style surprise digital release" – in reference to Beyoncé's self-titled album released to the iTunes Store in December 2013 without any prior warning – but Def Jam confirmed that Carey's album would receive a traditional release with pre-orders starting May 1, 2014, a pre-announced album cover, track listing and a final confirmed release date for May 27, 2014. The album also was released early to stream via USA iTunes 'First Play' on May 20, 2014. The album served as Carey's final release under her deal with Def Jam.

== Title and artwork ==
On June 16, 2013, Walmart put the album up for pre-order and revealed its title as The Art of Letting Go. The following day, producer Jermaine Dupri confirmed that Walmart was correct and that the album would be called The Art of Letting Go. In February 2014, Carey expressed dismay that the album's title had leaked and confirmed that a new title would now be chosen. The album was retitled Me. I Am Mariah... The Elusive Chanteuse, a two-part title taking its name from two things personal to Carey. The first part is the caption from Carey's "first and only self-portrait", a drawing she drew as a child which is included as part of the album's back cover, while the second half is a nickname she adopted.

Summarizing the title and album's concept, Carey said "This album is a reflection of some of the peaks and valleys that made me who I am today. I've always known me. I am Mariah." Carl Williot from Idolator called the album title both "absurd" and "insane". He also lambasted Carey for including "annoying" punctuation in the track listing, including a hashtag (#) for the song "#Beautiful", a period (.) for the song "Cry." and appending characters to the song "Money ($ * / ...)". Time's Dan Macsai called it the "greatest, most over-the-top album title of all time."

On the standard edition cover, Carey poses with her arms behind her head, while wearing a nude-colored crocheted swimsuit. The deluxe edition features a close-up of Carey's face, on the same sun-kissed background. Jeremy Blacklow from Yahoo! Music commented that some fans felt that the album covers "look retouched to the extreme".

== Composition ==
=== Genre and themes ===
The music reacts to Carey's fallow years in most every way it should. It returns her to the type of grand balladry, and formal melodies, that first made her a star. It's her most melodic, least-trendy album in memory — both moves that greatly flatter her.

— Jim Farber, New York Daily News

Consisting of fifteen songs and four deluxe songs Me. I Am Mariah... The Elusive Chanteuse is an R&B album with a diverse musical style that incorporates hip hop, hip hop soul, soul and elements of disco and gospel. Mike Wass of Idolator described the album as being a concept album that journeys through the eras of R&B, from Motown to the '90s, disco and early hip-hop. Describing the album, Carey noted that "there are a lot more raw ballads than people might expect [...] and there are also uptempo and signature-type songs that represent [my] different facets as an artist".

Writing for The Boston Globe, Sarah Rodman said "Me. I Am Mariah... offers up rhythmic hip-hop pop, gospel-inflected power ballads, old-school soul, and straight-up disco fantasias"; Rodman described the album's production as being built over a "pulsating atmosphere" and "fidgety rhythmic tracks." Jim Farber of New York Daily News said the album as a return to form after Memoirs of an Imperfect Angel (2009), which Fader described as a "disastrous". He noted the album's musical content as containing "grand balladry, and formal melodies."

Melissa Maerz of Entertainment Weekly, noted "nostalgia" to be a big and recurring theme both lyrically and musically, continuing to comment on this saying the "arrangements that borrow from Inner Life's disco rave-up 'I'm Caught Up (In a One Night Love Affair)' and the O'Jays' Philly-soul classic 'Let Me Make Love to You'." Eric Henderson of Slant Magazine noted the album's lyrics to be "personal, crazy. Crazy personal," Henderson continued calling the album's lyrical content an "deliberately confusing innocence with insight, obliviousness with bliss." Carey's voice on the album was described by Elysa Gardner of USA Today, as "artful melisma, robust belting and decorative high notes." Gardner continued, noting Mariah's use of her "supple middle and lower registers to convey feeling simply and directly."

=== Content and songs ===
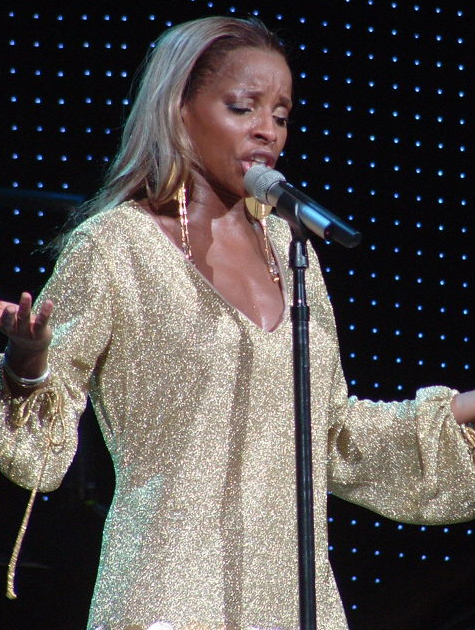
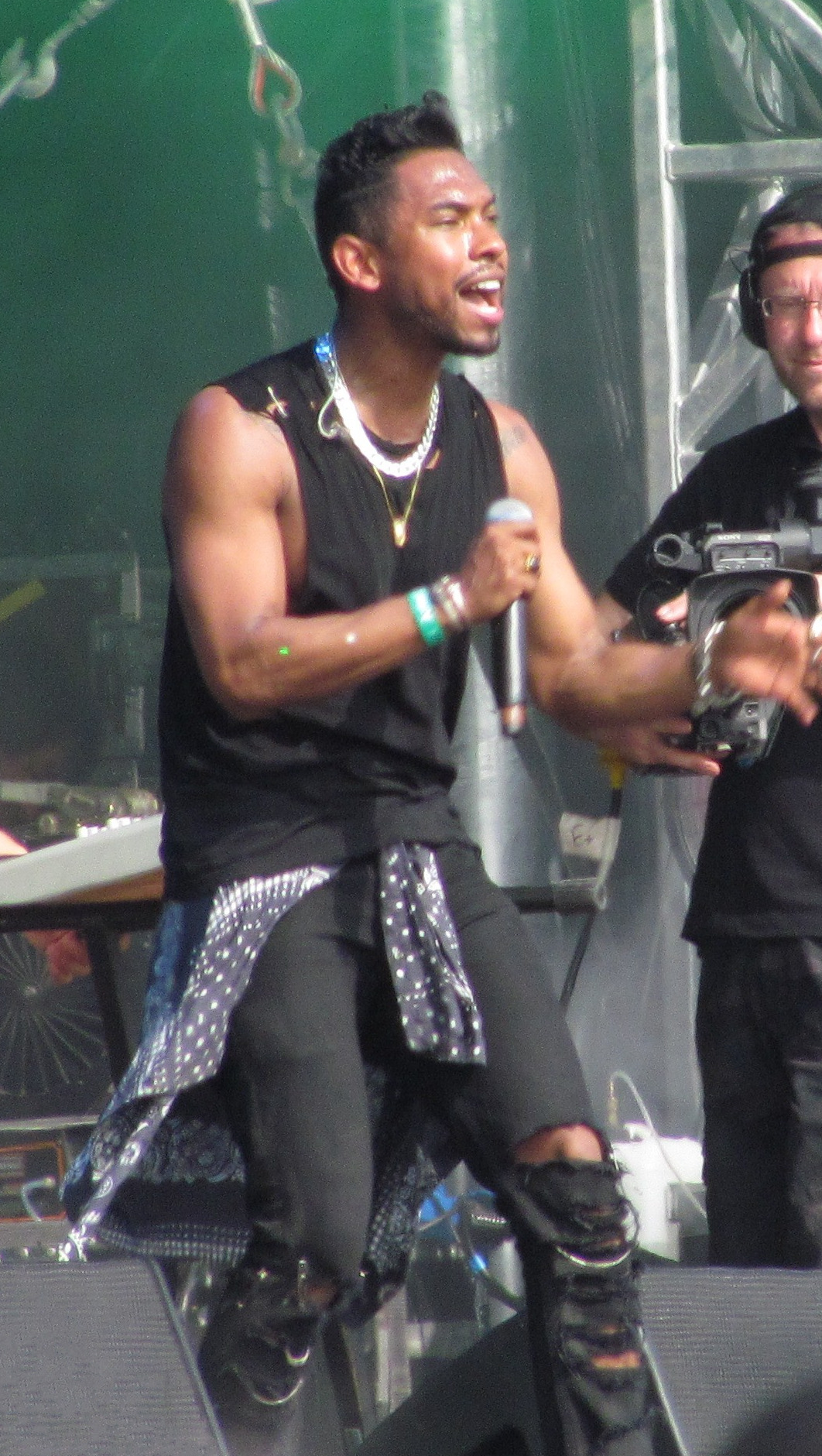
Mary J. Blige (left) and Miguel (right) were featured on the songs "It's a Wrap" and "#Beautiful" respectively.

The album opens with "Cry", a gospel song built over a piano, "simmering vocals and full-bodied runs" containing "swirling organs and scaling ad-lib." Described by Billboard magazine as being one of the album's most "heaviest moments," lyrically the song discusses Carey's desire to hold a lover until they both start "bawling." "Faded" is a "luscious" R&B song produced by Mike Will Made It, the song and Carey's vocals feature "climaxes" with the song taking influence from R&B hip-hop and pop genres. "Dedicated" features American rapper Nas, the song contains a sample from "Da Mystery of Chessboxin'" as performed by Wu-Tang Clan and lyrically discusses nostalgia, with Mariah and Nas looking back at their past relationships and how they have shaped their lives.

"#Beautiful" is a mid-tempo and stripped down R&B and soul music song. Carey's "big vocals" combined with Miguel's "signature eclectic rock and roll sound" results in "#Beautiful" having an old school vibe to it reminiscent of the Stax Records/Motown Records era, according to a reviewer for The Honesty Hour. "Thirsty" is a "club-friendly" hip hop and R&B song, which lasts for a duration of three minutes and 26 seconds. "Thirsty" is about how Carey's lover has a thirst for fame which causes her to drown in her own misery. American rapper Rich Homie Quan performs background chants on "Thirsty", although he is not credited on the album track list. He does, however, appear as a featured artist on a shortened alternate version of the song, and performs one rap verse.

"Make It Look Good" features Stevie Wonder on harmonica, and lyrically talks about "getting played" by a man yet she is deciding "to just go with it," the song is built over a "skipping '80's" beat that contains interpolations of "Let Me Make Love to You", written by Walter "Bunny" Sigler and Allan Felder. "You're Mine (Eternal)" is a love song which lasts for a duration of three minutes and forty-two seconds. The song utilizes a hypnotic and "smooth, steady" beat, which slowly but gradually builds to a sudden climax at the end. Lyrically, the track features Carey reminiscing about a past lover.

"You Don't Know What to Do" features American rapper Wale and contains interpolations of "I'm Caught Up in a One Night Love Affair", written by Patrick Adams and Terri Gonzalez. The song is a disco inspired track containing a "bumping" beat compared to music of 1977. "Supernatural" is a "sappy cut" featuring Carey's children credited as "Dem Babies". "Meteorite" is built over a "disco beat", lyrically the song is a running "commentary on celebrity culture", and contains a sample from "Goin' Up in Smoke", performed by Eddie Kendricks. "Camouflage" is a piano ballad, followed by "Money" featuring rapper Fabulous and features a sample from "Alabeke", performed by Dan Snatch, and "Rapper Dapper Snapper" performed by Edwin Birdsong. "Money" is an R&B song built over a "thumping" beat produced by Hit-Boy with lyrics that revolve around money not being important.

"One More Try" is a cover of George Michael's 1988 single of the same name, with an "'80s taste" and a "schmaltzy" production. "Heavenly (No Ways Tired / Can't Give Up Now)" is a gospel song with a choir that is dedicated as a tribute to the late Reverend James Cleveland. It contains an excerpt from the Reverend's sermon "God's Promise" performed by James Cleveland. The song also contains a sample of "Can't Give Up Now" performed by Mary Mary, "I Don't Feel No Ways Tired" performed by James Cleveland and "Good Ole Music" performed by Funkadelic.

The deluxe album consists of three extra songs; the opening track "It's A Wrap" features American singer Mary J. Blige. The song contains a sample of "I Belong to You" by Barry White, performed by the Love Unlimited Orchestra. "Betcha Gon' Know" was originally recorded and included on Carey's 2009 album Memoirs of an Imperfect Angel, the remix featuring R. Kelly leaked in July 2011, and draws influence from R&B. Carey announced that the remix would appear the album as a deluxe edition bonus track. "The Art of Letting Go" is an empowering gospel and classic R&B ballad with use of the piano, strings, and guitar. The song was originally the inspiration to also call the album The Art of Letting Go however, during an interview with MTV in February 2014, Carey revealed that she was frustrated that the album title leaked as she had not intended for the public to know about it just yet, and as a result she would be retitling the album.

== Promotion ==
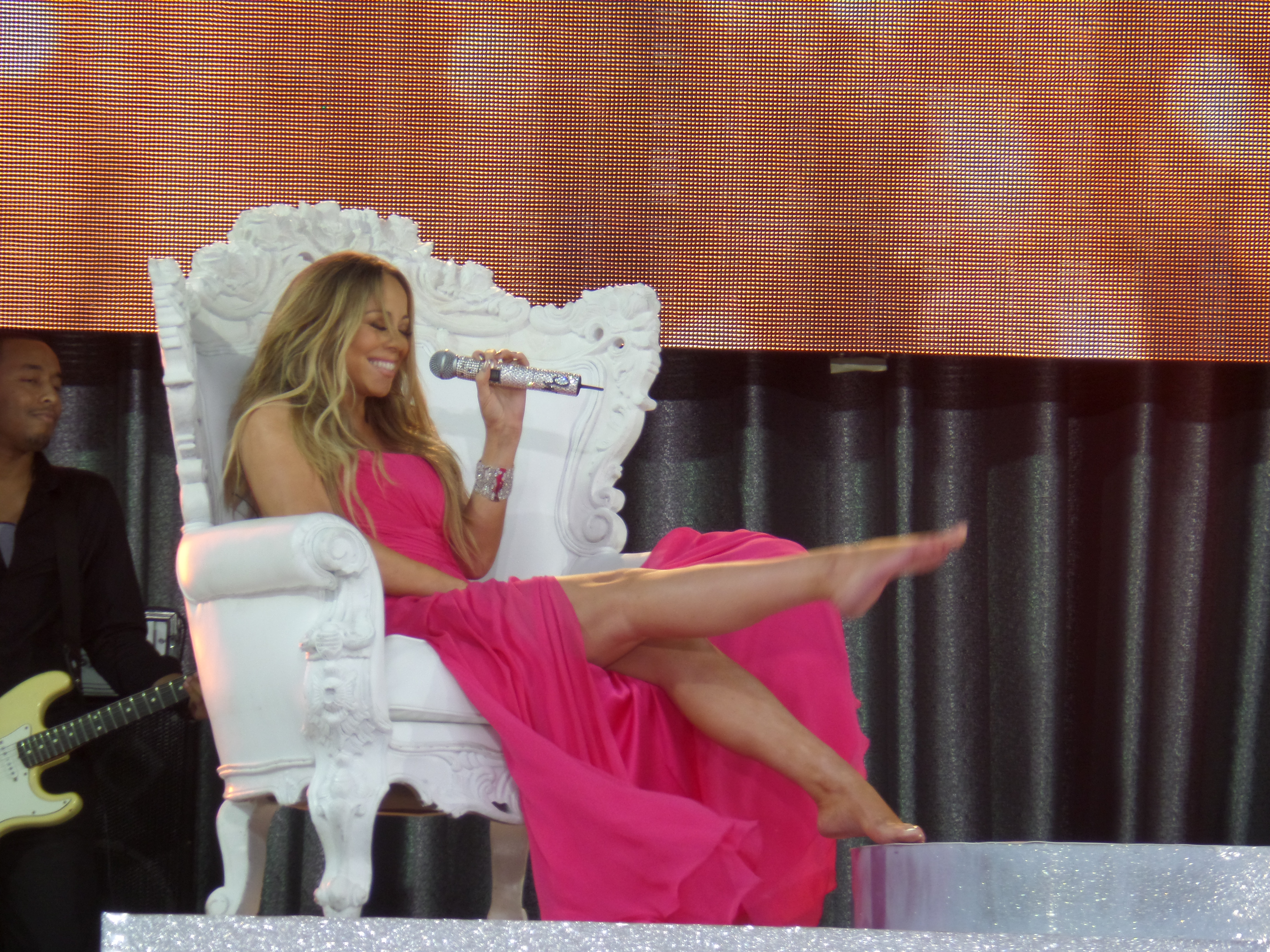
Carey singing "#Beautiful" live on Good Morning America, May 24, 2013

Carey taped a performance of "#Beautiful" along with a medley of her greatest hits on May 15, 2013. The medley included Carey's debut "Vision of Love", as well as other songs such as "Make it Happen", "We Belong Together", "My All", and "Hero". The taping aired the following day (May 16) during the American Idol season 12 finale episode. Carey performed "#Beautiful" with Miguel on June 2, 2013, at Hot 97's Summer Jam XX festival. She performed the remix of the song with Young Jeezy and Miguel on June 30, 2013, at the BET Awards.

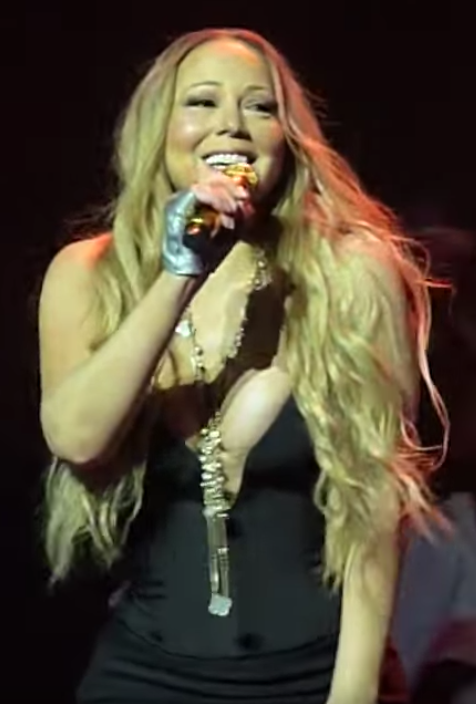
Carey (pictured) in 2014, performing at The Elusive Chanteuse Show in support of the album

The singer taped a performance of "The Art of Letting Go", along with a medley of "Auld Lang Syne", "Fantasy", "Honey", "#Beautiful", "Emotions", "Always Be My Baby", "Touch My Body" and "We Belong Together", for Dick Clark's New Year's Rockin' Eve, which aired on December 31, 2013. Carey performed "You're Mine (Eternal)" for the first time at the BET Honors on February 8, 2014, and the show premiered on TV Monday February 24, 2014. On February 13, 2014, Carey performed the song live while lighting up the Empire State Building. To promote the album further, Carey went on a two-legged headlining concert tour entitled, The Elusive Chanteuse Show.

=== Singles ===
"#Beautiful" was released as the album's lead single on May 7, 2013. "#Beautiful" made its debut on the Billboard Hot 100 chart at number 24, the highest debut of the week. It has since peaked at 15, becoming Carey's 33rd Top 20 Hit, and being one of only 5 to miss the Top 10. It also gave Miguel his 3rd Top 20 hit, after "Power Trip" (2013) and "Adorn" (2012). According to Nielsen SoundScan, "#Beautiful" had sold 1.2 million copies in the United States as of April 2014. Internationally, the song reached the top-ten position in Australia, Croatia, Denmark, New Zealand, South Africa, and South Korea. The music video for "#Beautiful" was directed by Joseph Kahn. It was filmed on April 21 and 22, 2013. The video was supposed to have its world premiere on American Idol on May 8, 2013, however, the release date was pushed back to May 9, 2013, instead. It was made available to view on Vevo and YouTube immediately after its television debut.

"The Art of Letting Go" had its world premiere via Facebook on November 11, 2013. It was commercially unsuccessful, peaking at number 19 on the Billboard Bubbling Under Hot 100 Singles. "Thirsty" was released as second promotional single in May 2014.

"You're Mine (Eternal)" was released as the third single on February 12, 2014. Commercially, the song has had limited success, charting inside the top 40 in Hungary, Korea, and Spain. In the United States, the song peaked at number 88 on the Hot 100, but became Carey's 17th number-one single on the Hot Dance Club Songs chart, placing her in fifth position as the artist with most number-one songs on that chart. "You Don't Know What to Do" impacted urban contemporary radio on June 30, 2014, and rhythmic contemporary radio on July 1, 2014, but failed to chart.

== Critical reception ==
Professional ratings
Aggregate scores
Source	Rating
AnyDecentMusic?	5.8/10
Metacritic	67/100
Review scores
Source	Rating
AllMusic	3.5/5 stars
Entertainment Weekly	B
Fact	2.5/5 stars
The Guardian	3/5 stars
Los Angeles Times	2.5/4 stars
New York Daily News	4/5 stars
Pitchfork	7.7/10
Rolling Stone	3/5 stars
Slant Magazine	3/5 stars
USA Today	3.5/4 stars

Upon release, Me. I Am Mariah... The Elusive Chanteuse received generally positive reviews. The review aggregator website Metacritic gives a weighted average rating to an album based upon the selected independent mainstream reviews it utilizes, and the album has a Metascore of a 67 out of 100 based on 15 reviews.

At AllMusic, Andy Kellman rated the album three-and-a-half stars out of five, saying how Mariah has abandoned the brevity of her earlier releases, but says the songstress is "still capable of delivering 40 minutes of strong, supremely voiced R&B when she's up for it.". He also stated that the standard edition of the album could have worked better without the clumpy and jumbled "Money", the oddly cheap sounding "One More Try", and the stiff/empty "Thirsty". Kenneth Partridge of Billboard rated the album a 77 out of 100, writing how Mariah has found her musical niche that her fans have come to expect that is a "mix of pop-classicist balladry and hip-hop-tinged summer jamming". At Entertainment Weekly, Melissa Maerz graded the album a B, saying how the release proves that her voice has been put through its paces, which she writes when Mariah is "trying to power through a note where it sounds like digital technology might be holding her up by the straps of that crocheted swimsuit." According to Gardner however, Mariah's vocal is "relaxed and confident". Also, Sargent notes that Mariah has "rarely sounded as comfortable."

Jim Farber of New York Daily News rated the album four stars out of five, writing how the title is not indicative of the release as a whole because he says Mariah is not "elusive" in the least on an album where she "made her talent more clear." At USA Today, Elysa Gardner rated the album three-and-a-half stars out of four, remarking whether "Elusive or not, this chanteuse is a survivor, and that's a rare thing in today's fickle, polarized pop landscape." Glenn Gamboa of Newsday graded the album an A−, commenting how Mariah has "nailed it" because she "goes for timeless [sounding music], with grand results." At The Plain Dealer, Troy L. Smith graded the album a B, indicating how the music meanders towards the latter stages of the album, yet noting that Mariah still picks the correct collaborators to work with on the release. According to Maher however, the collaborations serve no purpose just showing how Mariah is "desperate[ly] skirting around for identity" that "leaves this album feeling underwhelming." At Los Angeles Times, August Brown rated the album two-and-a-half stars out of four, indicating how Mariah vocally reined herself in on the album where she showcases her continued relevance. Kevin Ritchie of Now rated the album four N's out of five, finding out that "Carey's back to adding her sparkly touch to summer-ready pop tunes." At Pitchfork, Jordan Sargent rated the album a 7.7 out of ten, giving her credit for not sounding "desperate" because the tonality is "defiantly like Mariah, acknowledging her place in the pop ecosystem both implicitly and explicitly without chomping at the bit."

Nick Murray of Rolling Stone rated the album three stars out five, observing how "stylistic cohesion is as elusive as the chanteuse herself." At The Guardian, Caroline Sullivan rated the album three stars out of five, indicating how the release contains "a good deal of clutter", however, Mariah is "also at her most soulful and melodic" on a release she calls "a welcome return." Eric Henderson of Slant Magazine rated the album three stars out of five, observing how the release is chalked full of Undisciplined R&B pastiches." At The Boston Globe, Sarah Rodman gave a mixed review of the album, commenting on how even the good moments are "sabotaged", and the release as a whole is highly predictable with "a clutch of interchangeable slow-to-midtempo tunes long on pulsating atmosphere—several with distractingly fidgety rhythmic tracks—but short on melody or verve." Aimee Cliff of Fact rated the album two-and-a-half discs out of five, comparing the album unfavorably to Beyoncé's self-titled writing that "the record just doesn’t have the same candid, bold edge that characterised Beyonce's huge statement." At musicOMH, Amelia Maher rated the album two-and-a-half stars out of five, stating how Mariah's vocal range is undoubtedly robust, but this time around on the release she "falls short." On Rolling Stone's 20 Best R&B Albums of 2014, Me. I Am Mariah... The Elusive Chanteuse ranked at number 18.

=== Year-end lists ===
Publication	Accolade	Rank	Ref.
Rolling Stone	The Top 20 Best R&B Albums of 2014	18	
The Daytona Beach News-Journal	The Best Albums of 2014	—N/a	
The Quietus	The 10 R&B Albums of 2014	5	
Vibe	The Best 46 Albums of 2014	5	

== Commercial performance ==
In the United States, Me. I Am Mariah…The Elusive Chanteuse debuted at number three on the Billboard 200 albums chart with sales of 58,000 copies. It was her 17th top-ten album in the US since Nielsen SoundScan started tracking sales in 1991. It was present on the US Billboard 200 for a total of eight weeks, becoming her album with the shortest chart run to that point. As of April 2015, Me. I Am Mariah...The Elusive Chanteuse had sold 122,000 copies in the United States, making it her lowest-selling album at the time. Billboard speculated that its initial ratio of first-week sales to its sharp decline in sales thereafter suggested that interest in the album came primarily from a decreasing group of die-hard fans.

Meanwhile, in the United Kingdom, the album peaked at number fourteen on the UK Albums Chart, with sales of 6,547 copies. In its second week, the album dropped forty places to number 54, before completely falling out of the top 100 in its third week.

== Track listing ==
All lyrics are written by Mariah Carey, except where noted.

Standard edition
No.	Title	Lyrics	Music	Producer(s)	Length
1.	"Cry."		James "Big Jim" Wright; Mariah Carey	Carey; Wright	4:49
2.	"Faded"	Carey; Denisia “Blu June” Andrews	Mike Williams; Carey	Carey; Mike Will Made-It	3:39
3.	"Dedicated" (featuring Nas)	Carey; James Fauntleroy; Nasir Jones	Chauncey Hollis; Carey; Dennis Coles; Robert Diggs; Gary Grice; Lamont Hawkins; Jason Hunter; Russell Jones; Clifford Smith; Corey Woods	Carey; Hit-Boy; Darhyl "Hey DJ" Camper; Hazebanga^{[a]}	4:13
4.	"#Beautiful" (featuring Miguel)	Miguel Pimentel; Carey	Miguel; Carey; Nathan Perez; Brook "D'Leau" Davis; Mac Robinson; Brian Keith Warfield	Miguel; Carey; Happy Perez^{[b]}; Davis^{[a]}	3:20
5.	"Thirsty"	Carey; Andrews	Maryann Tatum; Carey	Carey; Hit-Boy; Rey Reel^{[b]}	3:26
6.	"Make It Look Good"		Jermaine Dupri; Carey; Bryan-Michael Cox; Walter "Bunny" Sigler; Allan Felder	Carey; Dupri; Cox	3:23
7.	"You're Mine (Eternal)"		Rodney "Darkchild" Jerkins; Carey	Carey; Jerkins	3:44
8.	"You Don't Know What to Do" (featuring Wale)	Carey; Olubowale Akintimehin	Dupri; Carey; Cox; Patrick Adams; Terri Gonzalez	Carey; Dupri; Cox	4:47
9.	"Supernatural"		Carey; Dupri; Cox	Carey; Dupri; Cox	4:38
10.	"Meteorite"		Carey; Kamaal Fareed; Felder; Norman Harris; Ron Tyson	Carey; Q-Tip	3:51
11.	"Camouflage"		Wright; Carey	Carey; Wright	4:49
12.	"Money ($ * / ...)" (featuring Fabolous)	Carey; John Jackson	Carey; Hollis; Dan Satch; Edwin Birdsong	Carey; Hit-Boy	4:55
13.	"One More Try"	George Michael	Michael	Carey; Dupri; Cox	6:17
14.	"Heavenly (No Ways Tired / Can't Give Up Now)"		Curtis Burrell; George Clinton; Carey	Carey; Dupri; Cox	5:39
15.	"Me. I Am Mariah... The Elusive Chanteuse" (digital-only bonus track)				1:12
Total length:					62:42

Deluxe edition
No.	Title	Lyrics	Music	Producer(s)	Length
15.	"It's a Wrap" (featuring Mary J. Blige)		Barry White; Carey	Carey; Heatmyzer; C. "Tricky" Stewart; Wright	4:04
16.	"Betcha Gon' Know" (featuring R. Kelly)	Carey; Kelly	Terius "The-Dream" Nash; Carey; Stewart; Wright; Kelly	Carey; Stewart; Nash; Wright	3:54
17.	"The Art of Letting Go"		Jerkins; Carey	Carey; Jerkins	3:44
18.	"Me. I Am Mariah... The Elusive Chanteuse" (digital-only bonus track)				1:12

Target and Japanese edition
No.	Title	Writer(s)	Producer(s)	Length
18.	"America the Beautiful"	Katharine Lee Bates; Samuel A. Ward	Carey; Wright	1:58

=== Notes ===
- ^{^[a]} signifies an additional producer.
- ^{^[b]} signifies co-producer.
- "Supernatural" is subtitled "(with special guest stars "Dembabies" a.k.a. Ms. Monroe & Mr. Moroccan Scott Cannon a.k.a. Roc 'N Roe)" on physical editions of the album.
- "It's a Wrap" and "Betcha Gon' Know" are remixes of "It's a Wrap" and "Betcha Gon' Know (The Prologue)" from Memoirs of an Imperfect Angel respectively.
- The title track is only included on digital editions of the album; it is not included on physical editions, as it is Mariah reading what is printed beneath the disc tray of the jewel case.

=== Sample credits ===
Sample credits were taken from the album notes.

- "Dedicated" contains a sample from "Da Mystery of Chessboxin'" by Wu-Tang Clan.
- "Make It Look Good" contains interpolations of "Let Me Make Love to You", written by Walter "Bunny" Sigler and Allan Felder.
- "You Don't Know What to Do" contains interpolations of "I'm Caught Up in a One Night Love Affair", written by Patrick Adams and Terri Gonzalez.
- "Meteorite" contains a sample from "Goin' Up in Smoke" by Eddie Kendricks.
- "Money ($ * / ...)" features a sample from "Alabeke" by Dan Satch and "Rapper Dapper Snapper" by Edwin Birdsong.
- "Heavenly (No Ways Tired/Can't Give Up Now)" is dedicated as a tribute to the late Reverend James Cleveland. It contains an excerpt from the Reverend's sermon "God's Promise" performed by James Cleveland. The song also contains a sample of "Can't Give Up Now" by Mary Mary, "I Don't Feel No Ways Tired" by James Cleveland and "Good Ole Music" by Funkadelic.
- "It's a Wrap" contains a sample of "I Belong to You" by Barry White & The Love Unlimited Orchestra.

== Credits and personnel ==
Credits were adapted from the liner notes and AllMusic.

=== Locations ===
- Jungle City Studios (New York, NY)
- Metrocity Studios (New York, NY)
- PatchWerk Recording Studios (Atlanta, GA)
- Rapture Studios (Bel Air, CA)
- Eardrumma Studios (Atlanta, GA)
- Beach House Studios (Eleuthera, Bahamas)
- Emagen Studios (Los Angeles, CA)
- Henson Recording Studios (Hollywood, CA)
- Studio at the Dunes (New York, NY)
- Pon de Islands Studios (Antigua and Barbuda)
- MJP Studios (Los Angeles, CA)
- Capitol Studios (Los Angeles, CA)
- Studio at the Palms (Las Vegas, NV)
- Ab Lab (Englewood, NJ)
- House of Hit Studios (Tarzana, CA)
- Germano Studios (New York, NY)
- Honeywest Studios (New York, NY)
- The Boom Boom Room (Burbank, CA)
- RMS Studios (Los Angeles, CA)
- Sunset Sound (Hollywood, CA)

=== Musicians and technical ===
- Mariah Carey – executive producer, liner notes, primary artist, producer, vocal arrangement, vocals, background vocals
- Ray Angry – keyboards
- Cindi Berger – public relations
- Stacey Laverne Berry – choir/chorus
- Nakiba Bonds – choir/chorus
- Delbert Bowers – assistant
- Troy Bright – choir/chorus
- Kristofer Buckle – make-up
- Caroline Buckman – viola
- Darhyl "DJ" Camper – producer
- Mr. Moroccan a.k.a. Moroccan Scott Cannon – featured artist
- Dembabies a.k.a. Ms. Monroe – featured artist
- Louis Cato – bass
- Matt Champlin – engineer
- Lauren Chipman – viola
- Jeremy Cimino – assistant
- Giovanna Clayton – cello
- Bryan-Michael Cox – producer, background vocals
- Brook Davis – additional production, drum programming
- Joel Derouin – concert master, violin
- Jermaine Dupri – management, mixing, producer, background vocals
- Jnyflower Choe – management
- Nico Essig – assistant
- Fabolous – featured artist,
- James Fauntleroy – background vocals
- Allan Felder –
- Connie Filippelo – public relations
- Vanessa Freebairn-Smith – cello
- Chris Galland – assistant
- Brian Garten – engineer, mixing, vocal mixing
- Ayana George – choir/chorus
- Larry Gold – conductor, string arrangements
- Ajanee Hambrick – choir/chorus
- Chandler Harrod – assistant
- Tamara Hatwan – violin
- Haze Banga – additional production, engineer, mixing, vocals
- Hit-Boy – producer
- Melinda Michelle Holder-Dawkins – choir/chorus
- John Horesco – engineer
- Stephen Hybicki – engineer
- Jaycen Joshua – mixing
- Rodney "Darkchild" Jerkins – producer
- Takeytha Johnson – background vocals
- Nasir "Nas" Jones – featured artist
- R. Kelly – featured artist
- Julie Jung – cello
- Rob Katz – assistant
- Ryan Kaul – assistant
- Marisa Kuney – violin
- Latasha Jordan – choir/chorus
- Songa Lee – violin
- Mario de León – violin
- Melanie Lesley – choir/chorus
- Manny Marroquin – mixing
- Kevin Matela – assistant
- Sherry McGhee – choir/chorus, background vocals
- Erin McGlover – choir/chorus
- Serena McKinney – violin
- Louise McNally – management
- Rachel MacIntosh – Assistant to Mariah Carey
- Melanie Rochford – choir/chorus
- Angelina Mendez – choir/chorus
- Miguel Pimentel – drum programming, featured artist, guitar, producer, vocals
- Mike Will Made It – producer
- Greg Morgan – engineer
- Tiffany Morriar – choir/chorus
- Oresa Napper-Williams – choir/chorus
- Melodie Nicholson – choir/chorus
- Barnell Norman – choir/chorus
- Serge Normant – hair stylist
- Grace Oh – violin
- Keith Parry – assistant
- Ilani Patterson – choir/chorus
- Happy Perez – guitar, co-producer
- Bob Peterson – violin
- Jackie Phillips – choir/chorus
- Chris Plata – engineer
- Kaila Potts – viola
- Herb Powers Jr. – mastering
- Andy Proctor – package production
- Q-Tip – keyboards, producer
- Rey Reel – co-producer
- Daniela Rivera – assistant
- Dave Rowland – assistant
- Zane Shoemake – assistant
- Chris Sholar – guitar
- Kathleen Sloan – violin
- Katrina Spence – choir/chorus
- Malik Spence – choir/chorus
- Steve Stoute – vocals
- Rob Suchecki – assistant
- Brian Sumner – engineer
- Jess Sutcliffe – engineer
- Shari Sutcliffe – contracting, production coordination
- Jenny Takamatsu – violin
- Phil Tan – mixing
- Kaylana Tatum – background vocals
- Mary Ann Tatum – vocal arrangement, vocal producer, background vocals
- Julio Whitaker – background vocals
- Eric Turner – choir/chorus
- Ina Veli – violin
- Josefina Vergara – violin
- Wale – featured artist,
- Andre Washington – choir/chorus
- Matt Weber – assistant
- Karla Welch – stylist
- Blair Wells – engineer
- Andy West – design
- Thomas Whiteside – photography
- Mike Whitson – viola
- Stevie Wonder – harmonica, soloist
- Eric Wong – marketing
- James "Big Jim" Wright – producer
- Kristen Yiengst – artwork, photo production
- Kenta Yonesaka – assistant, engineer
- Gabriel Zardes – assistant

== Charts ==
=== Weekly charts ===
Chart (2014)	Peak position
Australian Albums (ARIA)	5
Australian Urban Albums (ARIA)	2
Austrian Albums (Ö3 Austria)	38
Belgian Albums (Ultratop Flanders)	41
Belgian Albums (Ultratop Wallonia)	23
Canadian Albums (Billboard)	8
Chinese Albums (Sino)	4
Croatian International Albums (HDU)	10
Czech Albums (ČNS IFPI)	15
Danish Albums (Hitlisten)	13
Dutch Albums (Album Top 100)	14
French Albums (SNEP)	26
German Albums (Offizielle Top 100)	27
Greek Albums (IFPI)	10
Irish Albums (IRMA)	19
Italian Albums (FIMI)	15
Japanese Albums (Oricon)	25
Mexican Albums (Top 100 Mexico)	47
New Zealand Albums (RMNZ)	11
Scottish Albums (Official Charts)	32
South Korean Albums (Circle) Deluxe Version	12
Spanish Albums (Promusicae)	10
Swiss Albums (Schweizer Hitparade)	16
Taiwanese Albums (G-Music)	2
UK Albums (Official Charts)	14
UK R&B Albums (Official Charts)	2
US Billboard 200	3
US Top R&B/Hip-Hop Albums (Billboard)	1

=== Year-end charts ===
Chart (2014)	Position
Australian Urban Albums (ARIA)	42
South Korean International Albums (Gaon)	61
US Top R&B/Hip-Hop Albums (Billboard)	39

== Certifications and sales ==
Certifications and sales
Region	Certification	Certified units/sales
New Zealand (RMNZ)	Gold	7,500^{‡}
South Korea (Gaon)	—	1,647
United States	—	127,000
^{‡} Sales+streaming figures based on certification alone.

== Release history ==
Release dates and formats
Country	Date	Edition	Format	Label	Ref.
Australia	May 23, 2014	Standard; deluxe	CD; Digital download	Universal Music	
Germany	May 23, 2014	Standard; deluxe	CD; Digital download	Universal Music	
United Kingdom	May 26, 2014	Standard; deluxe	CD; Digital download	Virgin EMI	
Canada	May 27, 2014	Standard; deluxe	CD; digital download	Universal Music	
United States	May 27, 2014	Standard; deluxe	CD; digital download	Def Jam	
Japan	May 28, 2014	Standard; deluxe	Digital download	Universal Music Japan	
Japan	June 4, 2014	Japan CD edition	CD	Universal Music Japan	
Various	January, 2021	Standard edition	Vinyl (2LP)	Def Jam Recordings	

== See also ==
- List of Billboard number-one R&B/Hip-Hop albums of 2014
