= Meteorite (Mariah Carey song) =

Song by Mariah Carey

from the album Me. I Am Mariah... The Elusive Chanteuse
- Released: May 23, 2014
- Studio: Rapture Studios; Metrocity Studios; Jungle City Studios; Pon de Islands Studio
- Genre: Disco
- Length: 3:59
- Label: Def Jam
- Composers: Mariah Carey; Kamaal Fareed
- Lyricists: Carey; Fareed; Allan Felder; Norman Harris; Ron Tyson
- Producers: Carey; Q-Tip

"Meteorite" is a song by the American singer Mariah Carey from her fourteenth studio album, Me. I Am Mariah... The Elusive Chanteuse (2014). It was composed by Carey and Q-Tip. A disco track, it contains a sample of the recording "Goin' Up in Smoke" written by Allan Felder, Norman Harris, and Ron Tyson, all of whom received songwriting credits for "Meteorite" as a result. It also quotes an observation by Andy Warhol that everyone will achieve 15 minutes of fame.

"Meteorite" garnered mostly positive reviews from music critics, many of whom praised the disco influence and highlighted it as one of the album's best tracks. The song peaked at number 70 on the international download chart in South Korea. Carey performed "Meteorite" at the 2014 World Music Awards and included it on the set list of her 2014 tour, The Elusive Chanteuse Show.

== Production and composition ==
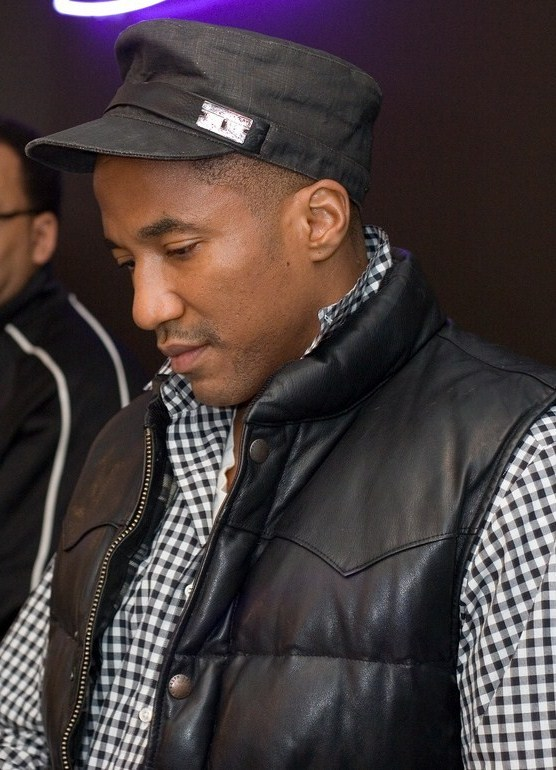
"Meteorite" was the first time Carey and Q-Tip had worked together since "Honey".

In an interview with Fuse in August 2012, Q-Tip confirmed that he was working with Carey on material for her fourteenth studio album. In April 2014, Carey confirmed that she and Q-Tip had worked together on a song which was yet to be mixed in an interview with Radio.com. Of the collaboration, Carey said "He's angry with me because he thinks that I didn't allow him to do his mix, but really it's okay. He loves me, we're going to make this work. And that's good because it's one of my favorite songs. I'm going to call him soon ... I think we need to get that ready." She also stated that it was the first time they had worked together since composing "Honey" for Carey's sixth studio album, Butterfly (1997).

"Meteorite" was written and produced by Carey and Q-Tip. It was recorded by Brian Garten and Blair Wells at several locations, including Rapture Studios in Bel Air, Metrocity Studios and Jungle City Studios in New York City, and Pon de Islands Studio in Antigua. Rob Sucheck served as the assistant during the recording sessions. Manny Marroquin mixed the song at Larrabee Studios in Universal City, and was assisted by Chris Galland and Delbert Bowers. "Meteorite" is a disco song with influences of dance music and 1980s style pop music, which lasts for a duration of three minutes and 59 seconds. Mike Wass of Idolator noted that Carey has dabbled with disco music since the release of "Fantasy" in 1995, but "never as faithfully" as she does on "Meteorite" and "You Don't Know What to Do" on Me. I Am Mariah... The Elusive Chanteuse. The song begins with an observation by Andy Warhol that everyone will achieve 15 minutes of fame which is followed by a rocket launch blast off sound effect.

Instrumentation consists of bass performed by Louis Cato, keyboards by Ray Angry and Q-Tip, and Chris Sholar on guitar. Lewis Corner for Digital Spy noted that is also makes use of a "rattling" percussion and a 1970s style "cosmic" synth line. Carey provided her own background vocals. Courtesy of permission granted by Motown Records, the song incorporates a sample of Eddie Kendricks' 1976 song "Goin' Up in Smoke", written by Allan Felder, Norman Harris and Ron Tyson; all three received songwriting credits for "Meteorite" as a result. Me. I Am Mariah... The Elusive Chanteuse was available to stream for free on iTunes prior to its release. During this time, an alternate version of the song called the "Meteorite Q-Tip Remix" was released by Q-Tip on May 23, 2014, to stream on Spotify. It features a different arrangement and mix to that of the version included on the album, and has a "galloping beat" according to Rap-Up.

== Critical reception ==
"Meteorite" received mostly positive reviews from contemporary music critics. Eric Henderson for Slant Magazine noted that "Meteorite", along with "You Don't Know What to Do", are two of Carey's "most serious-minded performances" on the album, describing them as "galaxies away" from her 2008 single "I'll Be Lovin' U Long Time". Of "Meteorite", he wrote "The chugging midnight soul train to gorgeous 'Meteorite' burns bright on the still-potent embers of Eddie Kendricks's urgent masterpiece 'Goin' Up in Smoke'". PopMatters writer Devone Jones complimented Carey taking "a brave step into untouched territory" in recording a 1980s style song. Labeling the track a "breezy banger" and an album highlight, Corner wrote that the song embodies an "oddly other-worldly" feel.

Fashion designer Donatella Versace and friend of Carey's told Vogue that "Meteorite" is "upbeat" and "has the power to lift your mood". Jim Farber of New York Daily News complimented the track, writing that the disco beat and the Warhol quote was reminiscent of Studio 54. John Sargent for Pitchfork Media was less impressed with the song, simply commenting that the song "is a gloopy scoop of Cher schmaltz". AXS writer John Shetler was critical of "Meteorite" and included it on his four worst songs list from the album, writing "'Meteorite' gets bonus points for opening with an Andy Warhol quote, but that's not enough to save the non-descript dance track with a grating, repetitive chorus and unimaginative lyrics about shooting stars and burning up the night sky."

== Live performances ==
Carey opened the 2014 World Music Awards with "Meteorite" in May 2014. In addition to performing, she was attending the event to collect a Pop Icon award for having sold 200 million records worldwide and for having the most number one songs for a solo artist in the United States. Carey was criticized for arriving at the ceremony over an hour late and delaying the show. Carey performed underneath disco balls while dancers skated around her on roller skates. Both Rap-Up and Vibe described the performance as "dazzling", with the former writing that "Carey [lit] up the stage". The show was due to air on NBC and was later cancelled by the network, though the ceremony later aired on August 3 through 4Music. "Meteorite" was included on Carey's 2014 tour, The Elusive Chanteuse Show.

== Charts ==
"Meteorite" debuted at number 70 on the South Korea International Download Singles Chart for the week ending May 31, 2014, with sales of 3,088 units.

Chart (2014)	Peak position
South Korea International Download (Gaon)	70
