= Funkin Matt =

- Also known as: Funkin Matt
- Born: Mats Ronander; 27 December 1986 (age 39); Tønsberg, Norway
- Genres: house; future house
- Occupations: Musician; DJ; remixer; record producer
- Years active: 2007–present
- Labels: Spinnin Records; Mad Decent; Fool's Gold; Dim Mak; Ultra Records; Musical Freedom; Fjordin; HELDEEP Records; Flashover Recordings
- Website: www.facebook.com/FunkinMattNO/

Mats Ronander (born 27 December 1986), better known by his stage name Funkin Matt, is a Norwegian record producer, remixer and DJ.

Ronander is best known for his remix of Mariah Carey's "You're Mine (Eternal)", with fellow producer Gregor Salto, which reached #1 on Billboards Dance Club Chart in 2014.

== Career ==
In 2007 Ronander released his first EP "Shake It Don't Break It" on Sidney Samson's label Samsobeats. In 2012 Funkin Matt came in touch with Fool's Gold Records boss A-Trak and went on to releasing "I Wish" on the Brooklyn based label. This caught the attention of Tiesto which reached out to Ronander, prompting him to later release the "Alive" EP on Tiesto's Musical Freedom.

Later in 2012, Ronander started working with US label Mad Decent, run by Diplo. He went on to release "Rapture" and "MAD" on the same label, the latter of which was featured in Ubisofts video game "The Crew". He also did guest mixes for both Diplo and Tiesto on their respective BBC Radio 1 radio shows.

In 2017 he signed tracks to Spinnin' Records, and released the tracks "Phoenix" on Spinnin' Deep and "Aurora" on Oliver Heldens' sub label Heldeep Records.

== Discography ==
=== Singles and extended plays ===
Year	Title	Label
2007	"Shake It Don't Break It"	Samsobeats
2008	"Doubles"	Samsobeats
2008	"House Buzz"	Samsobeats
2008	"Sweat"	Samsobeats
2008	"What You Wanna Do"	Samsobeats
2009	"Zee!"	Samsobeats
2009	"No More Lies"	Samsobeats
2010	"Jim Dandy"	Fjordin
2010	"You Bring Me Joy"	Fjordin
2011	"Get Loose" (featuring Teki Latex)	Fjordin
2011	"Tazer"	Fjordin
2011	"Love"	Fjordin
2011	"Monk"	Fjordin
2011	"In or Out"	Fjordin
2012	"I Wish"	Fool's Gold
2012	"Jaguar"	Fjordin
2012	"Burgundy"	Fjordin
2012	"Toasty Nutty Bass"	Fjordin
2013	"MAD"	Mad Decent
2013	"We Are Electric"	Fool's Gold
2013	"Arcade Machine"	Fjordin
2013	"Elevate"	Fjordin
2013	"Colossus"	Fjordin
2013	"Foxy" (with Gregor Salto)	Mixmash Records
2014	"Faraday"	Fjordin
2014	"Raise The Roof"	Ones To Watch
2014	"Alive"	Musical Freedom
2014	"America"	Fool's Gold
2014	"Let's Go Deep" (featuring Chris Lie)	Fjordin
2014	"My Love" (featuring Chris Lie)	Ultra
2015	"Rapture"	Mad Decent
2015	"Flux"	Dim Mak
2015	"Elephant"	Fjordin
2016	"Aero" (featuring Chris Lie)	Dim Mak
2016	"Elastic"	Fjordin
2016	"Mastic"	Fjordin
2016	"There Is Another Place"	Fjordin
2017	"Phoenix"	Spinnin' Deep
2017	"From The Ashes"	Fjordin
2017	"Aurora"	Heldeep
2018	"AEON"	Armada Zouk
2018	"Coda"	Armada Trice
2018	"Concrete"	Armada Deep
2019	"Feel So" (with Zeds Dead featuring Fiora)	Spinnin' Records
2020	"Somebody" (with Oliver Heldens featuring Bright Sparks)	Heldeep Records
2021	"Everything" (with 3lau)	Blume Music
2021	"Joi"	Heldeep Records
2021	"Hope" (featuring Tom Breeze)	Hexagon
2021	"Hypno"	Heldeep Records
2023	"Memento Mori"	Flashover Recordings

=== Remixes ===
List of remixes, showing year released and original artists
Year	Title	Original artists
2013	"Disco Nap" (Funkin Matt Remix)	A-Trak featuring Oliver
2013	"Wallpaper" (Funkin Matt Remix)	Staygold featuring Style of Eye & Pow
2014	"You're Mine (Eternal)" (Gregor Salto & Funkin Matt Remix)	Mariah Carey
2014	"High" (Funkin Matt Remix)	Peking Duk
2014	"Fem Fine Frøkner" (Funkin Matt Remix)	Gabrielle
2015	"Get Me Outta Here" (Funkin Matt Remix)	Steve Aoki & Flux Pavilion
2015	"Hold Me Back" (Funkin Matt Remix)	OMVR
2016	"Light Years" (Funkin Matt Remix)	Steve Aoki featuring Rivers Cuomo
2016	"Let's Get Lost" (Funkin Matt Remix)	G-Eazy
2017	"Scared to Be Lonely" (Funkin Matt Remix)	Martin Garrix & Dua Lipa
