= Beautiful (Mariah Carey song) =

2013 single by Mariah Carey ft. Miguel

"#Beautiful"

Single by Mariah Carey featuring Miguel

from the album Me. I Am Mariah... The Elusive Chanteuse
- Released: May 6, 2013
- Recorded: 2013
- Studio: Rapture, Bel Air; Metrocity, New York; Pon de Islands, Antigua; MJP, Los Angeles; Henson Recording, Los Angeles
- Genre: R&B
- Length: 3:22
- Label: Island Def Jam
- Songwriters: Mariah Carey; Miguel Pimentel; Nathan Perez; Brook Davis; Mac Robinson; Brian Keith Warfield
- Producers: Mariah Carey; Miguel; Happy Perez; Brook Davis

Mariah Carey singles chronology
"Almost Home" (2013)	"#Beautiful" (2013)	"The Art of Letting Go" (2013)

Miguel singles chronology
"How Many Drinks?" (2013)	"#Beautiful" (2013)	"PrimeTime" (2013)

Music video
- "#Beautiful" on YouTube

"#Beautiful" is a song recorded by American singers Mariah Carey and Miguel. It was released as the lead single from Carey's fourteenth studio album, Me. I Am Mariah... The Elusive Chanteuse (2014). "#Beautiful" was written by Carey, Miguel, Nathan Perez, Brooke Davis, Mac Robinson, and Brian Keith Warfield, with Carey, Miguel and Perez producing the song. Released on May 6, 2013, Carey and Miguel did not reveal that they had collaborated on the song, until April 25, 2013, when Carey revealed the title in a 25-second teaser video during season twelve of American Idol. It was also on Idol, on May 9, that Carey premiered the official music video for "#Beautiful", before uploading an alternative edit to her VEVO account, that is set to the explicit version of the song.

"#Beautiful" is a mid-tempo and stripped down R&B track. It was well-received by music critics, many of whom were complimentary of Carey and Miguel's chemistry as well as the song's summery nature. After garnering an audience impression of 31 million in its first two days of radio airplay, the song debuted at number 44 on the US Radio Songs chart. Carey taped a performance of the song along with a medley of her greatest hits on May 15, 2013; the taping aired the following day on the Season 12 finale episode of American Idol.

"#Beautiful" peaked at number 15 on the Billboard Hot 100 chart and at number three on the Hot R&B/Hip-Hop Songs chart in the United States. It received a double Platinum certification from the Recording Industry Association of America and is her thirteenth single which shipped over a million copies. It also peaked at number six on the Australian Singles Chart and has also received a platinum certification by the Australian Recording Industry Association and gold certification from Recorded Music NZ.

== Background and release ==
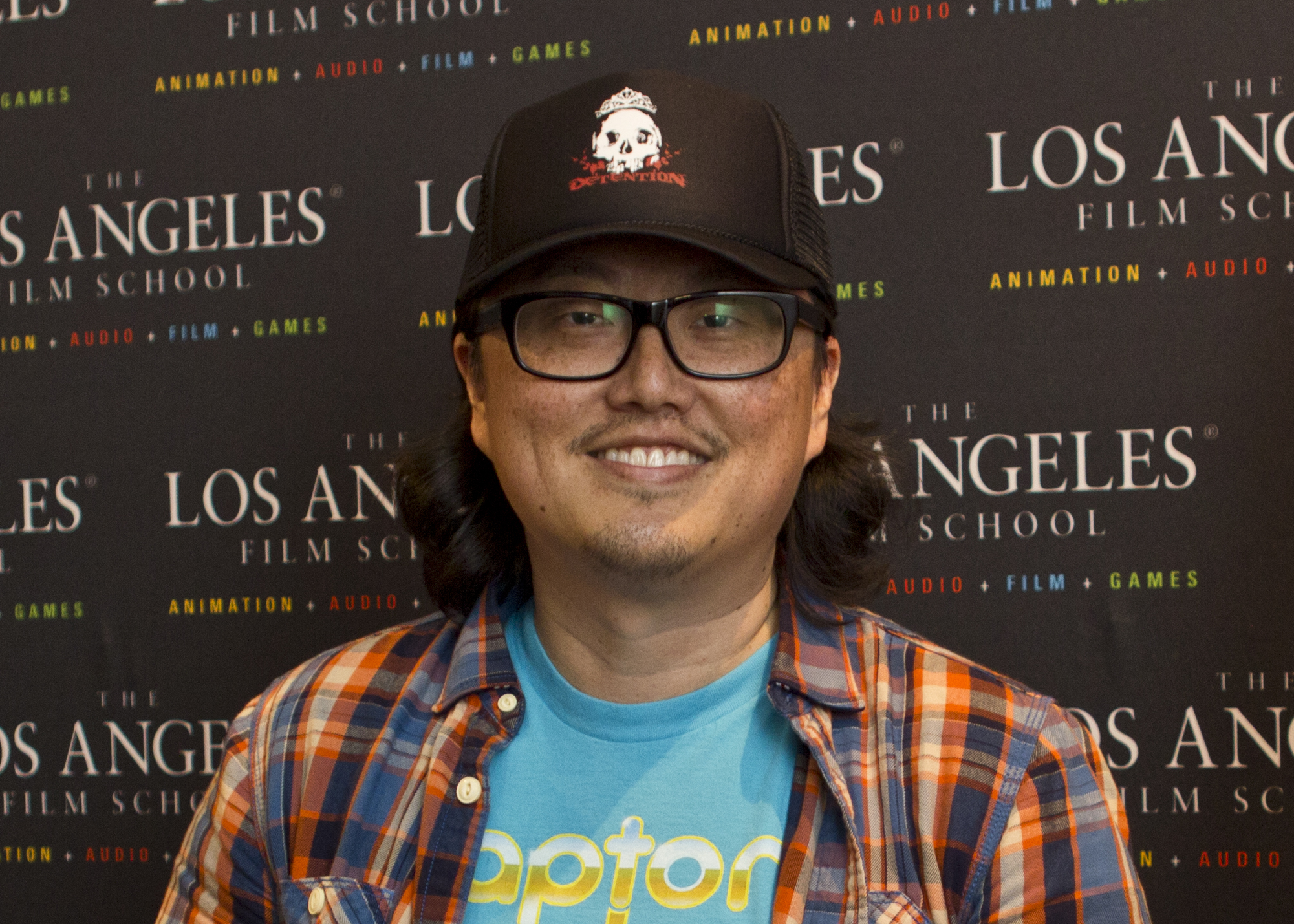
Sound mixer Fletcher Allison tweeted that he had been on the set of a Mariah Carey and Miguel music video, and that Joseph Kahn (pictured) had directed it, which led to speculation that the singers had collaborated on her album's lead single.

"#Beautiful" was written and produced by Mariah Carey and Miguel. Rumors that Carey and Miguel had collaborated on a song together began when the pair were tweeting to each other on April 3, 2013, when Carey tweeted to Miguel praising his Saturday Night Live performance. She also revealed that they had crossed paths in a recording studio. On April 18, 2013, Carey revealed that she had finished mixing the lead single from her upcoming fourteenth studio album. On April 21, 2013, sound mixer Fletcher Allison revealed that he had been on set of a music video directed by Joseph Kahn which involved Carey and Miguel; the tweet was later deleted. The deleted tweet read "Working on a Mariah Carey and Miguel video for the man Joseph Kahn ... Wouldn't trade this for 1,000 Coachellas". Miguel refused to confirm if the collaboration between himself and Carey was true or not. When asked by an interviewer what he thought a collaboration with Carey would sound like, if the rumors were true, he responded with "I think it would sound beautiful. I think it's a great juxtaposition". He continued to reveal that he has admired Carey for a very long time and admired her as an artist, saying "I mean I fell in love with Mariah Carey when she walked out of the pool in [the 'Honey' video in 1997]. That 'Honey' video, that was it. And I've had a huge crush on her ever since. And, so, if we ever do have a chance, you know all respect to [Carey's husband] Nick [Cannon], all love. I think I have a huge crush more on her as a musician, and I think it would be really great".

"I'm always looking for something that I haven't seen before," he told Billboard. "[Also] something that's going to make an impact [by] using simple elements but creatively so it makes people think a bit."

—Miguel on collaborating with Mariah Carey to Billboard (2013).

On April 25, 2013, Carey premiered a 25-second teaser video on American Idol. Over a guitar lick, the video revealed that Miguel would appear as a featured artist and that the song would be called "#Beautiful", accompanied by a message which read "The new era begins". Other aspects of the teaser showed a motorbike and Carey giggling. The song premiered on May 6, 2013, and was released for digital download on the US iTunes store the next day. It officially impacted US Mainstream and Rhythmic radio on May 7, 2013. On the day of its premiere on May 6, 2013, Clear Channel Media and Entertainment launched the single with a day-long world premiere event across more than 230 Clear Channel radio stations nationwide. Beginning 7am, "#Beautiful" played at the top of each hour until 11pm on Top 40, Rhythmic, AC, Hot AC and Urban stations.

== Artwork ==
The artwork for "#Beautiful" was released on May 3, 2013. It features Carey stroking her face with her eyes closed and Miguel peering back over his shoulder at her through Aviator sunglasses. Sam Lansky for Idolator wrote that the release of the artwork confirmed that the song truly is called "#Beautiful" (hashtag beautiful), not "Beautiful", which is #dark (hashtag dark) and #depressing (hashtag depressing)." He expressed disappointment at how the pictures of Carey and Miguel are from the music video teaser and is not something new or different, writing that is displays Carey running her hands up her neck and messing about with her hair. Lansky was also critical of the artwork's font, writing "And the same old font that she's been using for a decade? And a butterfly icon replacing an ampersand? No. No, Mariah. Branding is one thing, but you are due for an upgrade". He concluded his review of the artwork by saying that the bar is set low because of one of Carey's previous single, "Triumphant (Get 'Em)", failing to achieve commercial success, and that if "#Beautiful" was revealed to be a good song, he would forgive her.

== Composition and lyrical interpretation ==
"#Beautiful"
A 21-second sample of "#Beautiful" where Carey singing the song's verse and hook.

"#Beautiful" is a mid-tempo and stripped down pop, R&B and soul music song which lasts for a duration of three minutes and 22 seconds. Carey's "big vocals" combined with Miguel's "signature eclectic rock and roll sound" results in "#Beautiful" having an old school vibe to it reminiscent of the Stax Records/Motown Records era, according to a reviewer for The Honesty Hour. The instrumental of the song begins with a "simple, twangy guitar lick"; Brian Mansfield for USA Today compared the opening to something that Steve Cropper may have created for American singer Carla Thomas "back in the day". It features a prominent an "immediately embeddable" and "creeping" guitar line with "cracking" percussion and bass line which "screams" Motown, according to Jason Lipshutz for Billboard.

The song opens with a verse performed by Miguel, which begins with the lyrics "Hop on the back of my bike, let the cool wind blow through your hair". At first, it does not appear to sound as though it is a song by Carey, as Miguel performs the first 90 seconds. Carey and Miguel embark on a motorbike cruise at sunset, as he sings about her beauty in the lyrics "let the moonlight kiss your skin". After the first 90 seconds, Carey assumes the lead artist role and performs the rest of "#Beautiful". Carey responds with "I like when you run red lights, don't stop till you thrill me", which Randall Roberts for Los Angeles Times thought would alarm mothers and police officers. After Carey sings the line "Take me anywhere", she releases a little giggle. "#Beautiful" ends with a textured layering of both Carey's and Miguel's vocals which gradually fade as the song draws to a close.

== Critical reception ==
'"#Beautiful" received positive reviews from music critics. Randall Roberts for the Los Angeles Times wrote that when he read that another music critic Maura Johnston had declared "#Beautiful" as 2013's "song of the summer" on the day its premiere, he was dismissive of the claim, and did not feel it was necessary to rush to listen to the song. He expressed "skepticism and dread" at the thought, as he felt that a song with a hashtag in the title, the song being called "#Beautiful", which he feels is an over used word, Roberts branded the song as "Silly, trendy and typical" before listening to it. He further wrote that when he put his headphones into his computer, he was worried that Carey would sing the word "hashtag" in the lyrics, but after listening to the song in its entirety, he proclaimed it as a "perfect pop song". He was complimentary of the songs instrumental and production, and described it as "seductive". Roberts also wrote that although Carey does not enter the song until a third of the way through, she matches Miguel's "glorious tone with the confidence of someone who knows she can lift her verse to equal whatever comes her way" with a "glorious tone". A reviewer for Rap-Up wrote that "#Beautiful" is perfect for the summer.

Jenna Hally Rubenstein for MTV Buzzworthy wrote that the song features "Miguel's soothing R&B pipes and Mariah's 1991-sounding ethereal vocals" and continued to compliment the songs overall appeal. Brian Mansfield for USA Today felt that the Stax/Motown influence is what makes "#Beautiful" "such a winner", as it represents Carey's return to form in an altogether unexpected way. Jordan Sargent for Spin praised the song, writing that "#Beautiful" is what summer is made of. A reviewer for Idolator called the song a "nod to old-school R&B" and wrote that Carey takes advantage of Twitter and the appeal of it by including a hashtag in the song's title. Carrie Battan for Pitchfork Media was critical of the use of the hashtag in the song's title, but applauded it for featuring Miguel, and said that the song had "the finger-snapping R&B throwback charm that sounds primed for repeat play through the summer". Aisha Harris of Slate also said "#Beautiful" could be one of the hits of the summer, calling it "a breezy duet" that "is pure pop, and it sounds great." At the 2013 Teen Choice Awards, "#Beautiful" was nominated in the category of Best R&B Hip/Hip Song.

== Versions and remixes ==
Carey stated that there are 5 official remixes for "#Beautiful". The first remix has a new guest verse by rapper A$AP Rocky. The second remix is in spanglish and is titled "#Hermosa". The third remix is a dance remix by Louie Vega. The fourth remix features Young Jeezy. It has a reworked beat by DJ Mustard and features brand new re-recorded vocals by Carey. The fifth and final remix is another dance remix, this time by Sidney Samson. On July 23, 2013, Carey played a snippet of a 6th remix of the song, stating: "I re-sang new vocals for a hot new dance remix that is coming your way very very soon, and I wanted to play a little snippet, which is for laughs, very old school moments, here we go!".

== Chart performance ==
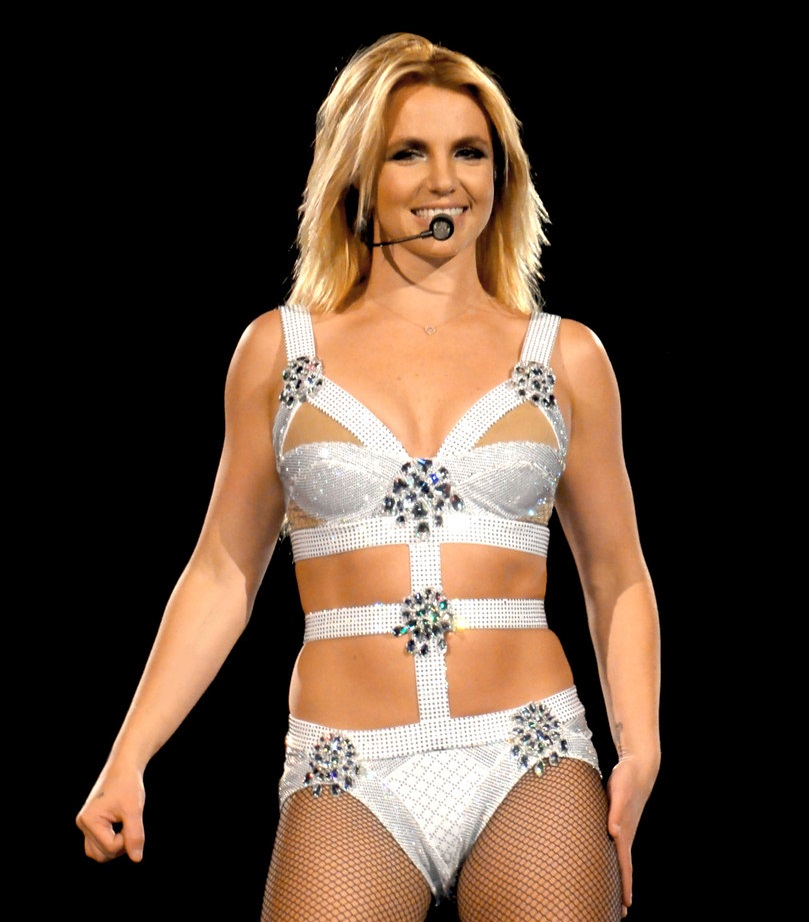
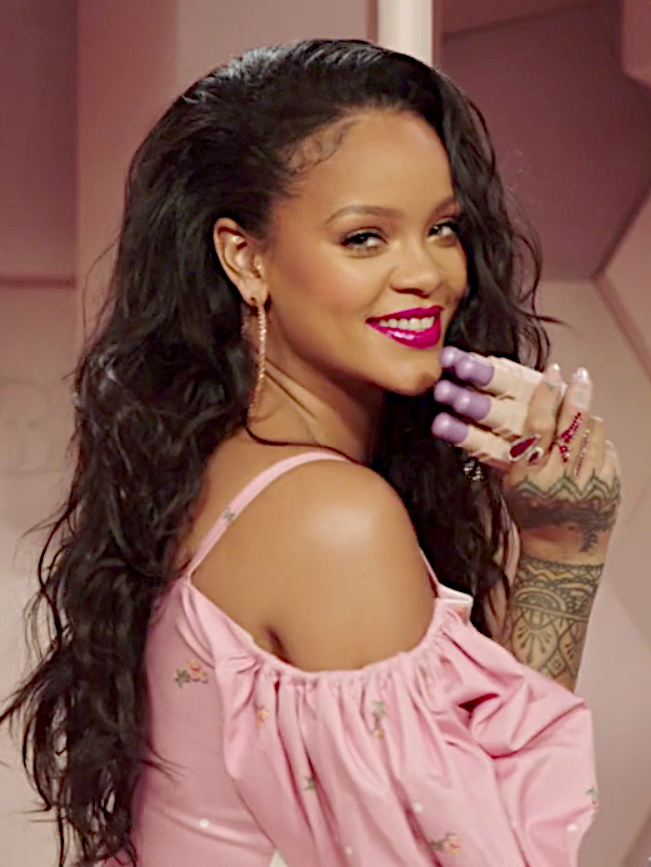
At the time, Carey upped her tally to 30 entries with "#Beautiful"'s debut on the US Pop Songs chart. She is tied in second place with Britney Spears (left); only Rihanna (right) has more entries with 35.

"#Beautiful" debuted at number four on the US Bubbling Under Hot 100 chart on Thursday May 9, 2013. The following week, after airplay and digital sales were counted from the previous week, "#Beautiful" made its debut on the Billboard Hot 100 chart at number 24, the highest debut of the week. It has since peaked at 15, becoming Carey's 33rd Top 20 Hit, and being one of only 5 to miss the Top 10. It also gave Miguel his 3rd Top 20 hit, after Power Trip (2013) and Adorn (2012). "#Beautiful" debuted on the Adult Contemporary chart at number 23 and on the Adult Pop Songs chart at number 35. On the Hot Digital Songs chart, "#Beautiful" debuted at number 10 with first week digital download sales of 114,000. It is Carey's eighth top 10 single on the chart, and is her first song to do so since her 2009 single "Obsessed", which peaked at number seven. According to Nielsen SoundScan, "#Beautiful" had sold 1.5 million copies in the United States as of July 2017.

On the R&B charts, it debuted at number 39 on the Hot R&B/Hip-Hop Songs chart for the week ending May 18, 2013, due to strong airplay in its first two days of release. and jumped to number seven the following week. On the R&B Songs chart, "#Beautiful" debuted at number 16 for the week ending May 18, 2013, and rose to number two the following week, barred by Justin Timberlake's and Jay-Z's song "Suit & Tie". It also debuted at number two on the Hot R&B/Hip-Hop Digital Songs chart, being held off of the top spot by Macklemore and Ryan Lewis' song "Can't Hold Us", featuring Ray Dalton. It debuted at number 22 on the Pop Songs chart. It is Carey's third-highest debut on the chart, behind "Dreamlover", which holds the record for the highest debut at number 12, and "Endless Love" at number 20. With this, Carey ups her tally to 30 entries on the chart and is tied in second place with Britney Spears; only Rihanna has more entries with 35. It is the second chart entry for Miguel, whose first song on the chart, "Adorn", peaked at number 35 in December 2012. "#Beautiful" entered the Rhythmic Top 40 at number 22. Carey extends her record for the most chart entries with 37; Rihanna is in second place with 35.

In Europe, the song debuted in Ireland, where it entered the singles chart at number 86 on May 9, 2013. On May 11, 2013, "#Beautiful" debuted at number 68 in the Netherlands. In the United Kingdom, the song debuted at number nine on the UK R&B Chart on May 12, 2013, and rose to number four the following week. It remained at number four in its third week. It debuted at number 39 on the UK Singles Chart on May 12, 2013, and climbed to number 27 the following week. In its third week, it rose three positions to number 24. It has peaked at number 23 on the UK Digital Chart. In New Zealand the song has reached the top ten and peaked at number 10 on the New Zealand Singles Chart.

== Music videos ==
=== Original ===
The music video for "#Beautiful" was directed by Joseph Kahn, who previously directed the music video for Carey's "Boy (I Need You)" (2003). It was filmed on April 21 and 22, 2013. The video was supposed to have its world premiere on American Idol on May 8, 2013, however, the release date was pushed back to May 9, 2013, instead. It was made available to view on Vevo and YouTube immediately after its television debut. The video has a simple production and it lasts for 3 minutes and 22 seconds where Carey appears wearing a short yellow dress with a jump read shoe line done by the French designer Christian Louboutin. Shortly before its launch, Khan posted on his Twitter: "The video is really simple. Had not much time to produce it. But Mariah is beautiful. Taste of simplicity." In May 2013, Carey released the video with images of the backstage and by May 27 Carey uploaded the explicit version of the song through her VEVO account titled "#Beautiful (Explicit Version)".

The video starts with Carey riding on the back of Miguel's bike as he asks her through the lyrics of the song to hop on the back of your bike. Images are interspersed with scenes of Carey running her hands through the air while she and Miguel ride into the sunset. Carey makes various movements with her body around a barn, while Miguel sits in a red convertible. Mariah is then illuminated by the headlights, and Miguel is dazzled by her beauty.

Sam Lansky of Idolator commented that "the clip is not complicated, it's basically an opportunity for Mariah look amazing, what she does! Her body is sexy and she seems to have about half her age in a superior culture". Malachi of The Honesty Hour commented on the work: "Carey felt all over herself for most of the video" and "Miguel seemed very soft in his biker gear, too. still said that video is a great addition to the single". Jason Lipshutz of Billboard described the clip as "flirtatious", noting that it only provides a platform different from Mimi to be a diva, "Carey rotates with a short yellow dress for him [Miguel], the brightness of the headlights provide a spotlight for the singer improvised. James Robertson of the British newspaper Daily Mirror commented that "the song could have been written about stuffed animals or how cement – Mariah Carey would have still found a way to make the music video sexy.

=== Other versions ===
A brand new video for the Spanglish version of the song, "#Hermosa", was filmed on June 17, 2013, in Capri, Italy. It was released on July 1, 2013, via Carey's official VEVO account. On July 7, 2013, Carey filmed a third video, this time for the song's remix featuring Young Jeezy. It was directed by Nick Cannon in New York City. While on set, Carey had an injury. In an interview, Cannon stated: "She was in this nice, beautiful gown, heels on and everything, and was kind of on this platform and reached and slipped and fell on her whole side, It was pretty serious. Not only did she dislocate her shoulder, she actually cracked a rib, and chipped her shoulder bone......She's such a trooper, like I was gonna rush her to the hospital, [but] she was like "you get back in there and finish the video"....and then after they put the shoulder back in place and bandaged her all up, she came back to the [set] early in the morning and finished out everything....So, she was like this better be a good video after all this pain I went through". On July 23, 2013, Carey stated: "We finished editing the #Beautiful remix video with Jeezy". Carey's physical therapist Samantha also gave an insight on Carey's condition: "When I started working with MC about two weeks ago, I was actually really surprised that she had even done the Central Park show because of how serious these injuries are. I was amazed that she actually went on stage. If people could actually see it, they'd understand the severity of what's going on. Despite that, she's been recovering nicely and we're focusing on helping her recover as quickly as possible. But if any of you know what an injury is, it's a long road to recovery. We're dealing right now with a dislocated shoulder, fractured rib, nerve injury...But MC's a navy seal, like I told her, she's a navy seal and she's really good at smiling through the pain... Like anyone else, it's gonna take some time to heal but she's strong and she will be back. She will be back!".

== Live performances ==
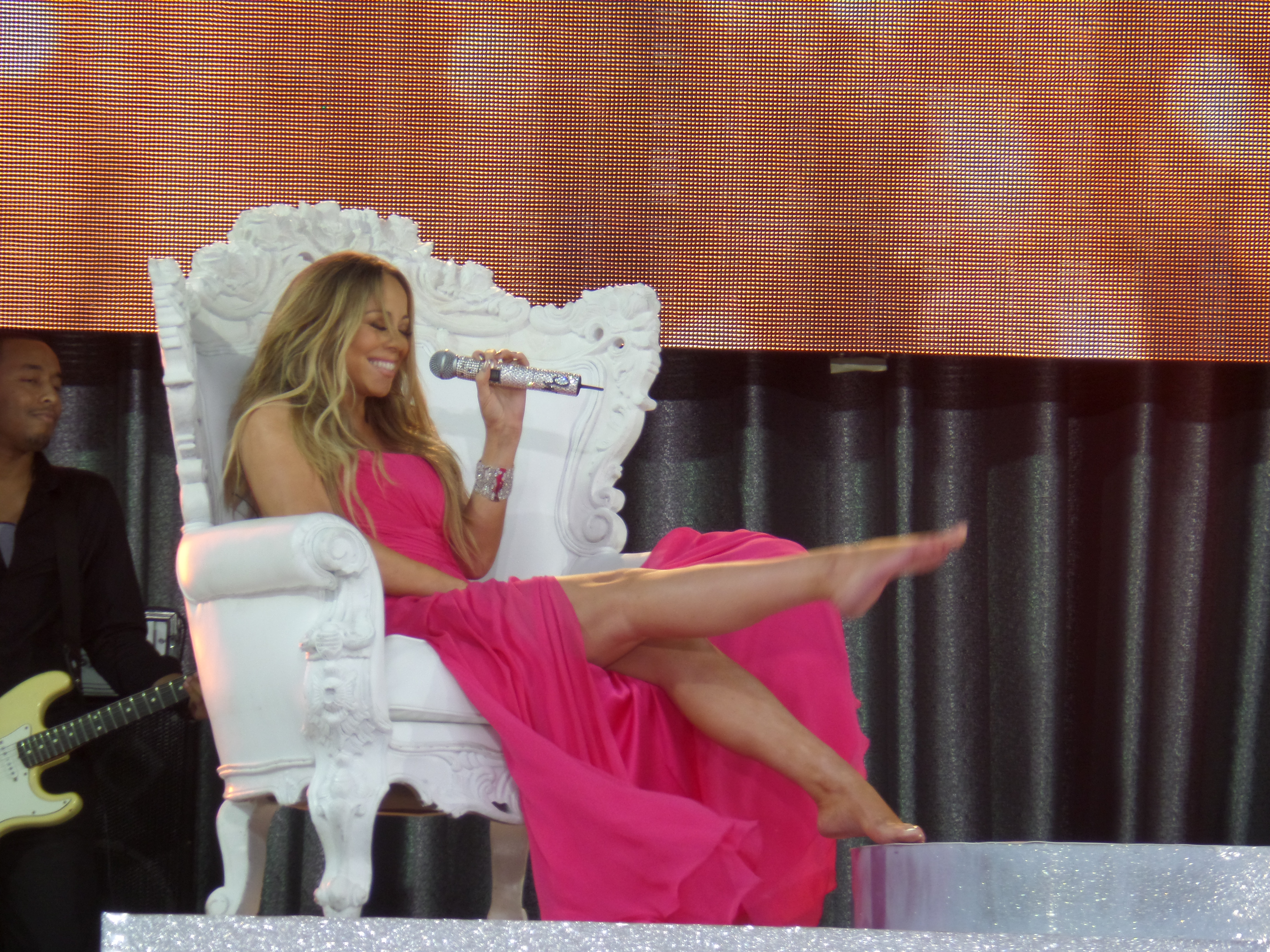
Carey singing "#Beautiful" live on Good Morning America, May 24, 2013.

Carey taped a performance of "#Beautiful" along with a medley of her greatest hits on May 15, 2013. The medley included Carey's debut "Vision of Love", as well as other songs such as "Make it Happen", "We Belong Together", "My All", and "Hero". The taping aired the following day (May 16) during the American Idol Season 12 finale episode. Many critics commented on Carey's vocal performance on the finale of the American Idol season. Lisa Timmons of Idolator said he had a good authority from a credible source who attended the performance of Carey, who undoubtedly was live. A writer from People magazine said that "it was a vibration and yes, the vocal acrobatics of singer and current judge reality show was pre-recorded. Carey also opened the 2013 Good Morning America Summer Concert Series on May 24, 2013, where she performed "#Beautiful" as part of her set list along with number-one hits "Always Be My Baby" and "We Belong Together".

Carey performed the song with Miguel on June 2, 2013, at Hot 97's Summer Jam XX festival. She performed the remix of the song with Young Jeezy and Miguel on June 30, 2013, at the BET Awards. The singer pre-taped her performance of the song along with "Hero" and "America The Beautiful" on June 27, 2013, for the Macy's Fourth of July Spectacular, which aired on NBC on July 4. On July 13, 2013, Carey performed "#Beautiful" at the Major League Baseball All-Star Charity concert for Sandy Relief at Central Park in New York City. The other songs that Carey performed were "Hero", "My All", and "Looking In", a song from her fifth studio album released in 1995, Daydream, which she had never sung live before. Carey had to drop "We Belong Together" from the setlist due to painful breathing and fractured ribs, result of an accident a few days back. Additionally, due to her dislocated shoulder, the singer wore three bedazzled, fur-and feather-draped slings, two that matched her white outfit, and one that matched her black outfit; the slings were designed by Gucci.

== Track listing ==
- Digital download
1. "#Beautiful" (featuring Miguel) – 3:22
- Digital download – Spanglish Remix
1. "#Hermosa" (Spanglish Version, featuring Miguel) – 3:21
- Digital download – Remix
1. "#Beautiful" (Remix, featuring Miguel and ASAP Rocky) – 3:21
2. "#Beautiful" (Remix, featuring Miguel and Young Jeezy) – 3:23
- Streaming – Dance Remix
1. "#Beautiful" (Louie Vega EOL Remix) – 2:59
2. "#Beautiful" (Sidney Samson Remix) – 6:21

== Credits and personnel ==
Credits adapted from the liner notes of Me. I Am Mariah... The Elusive Chanteuse.

Recording

- Recorded at Rapture Studios, Bel Air, CA; Metrocity Studios, New York, NY; Pon de Islands Studios, Antigua; MJP Studios, Los Angeles, CA; Henson Recording Studios, Los Angeles, CA.
- Mixed at Larrabee Studios.

Personnel

- Mariah Carey – vocals, songwriting, production
- Miguel – songwriting, production, drum programming, guitars
- Mac Robinson – songwriting
- Brian Keith Warfield – songwriting
- Brian Garten – recording
- Chris Plata – recording
- Manny Marroquin – mixing
- Chris Galland – mix assistant
- Delbert Bowers – mix assistant
- Happy Perez – guitars, co-production, songwriting
- Brook "D'Leau" Davis – additional drum programming and production, songwriting

== Charts ==
=== Weekly charts ===
Chart (2013)	Peak position
Australia (ARIA)	6
Australia Urban (ARIA)	2
Belgium (Ultratip Bubbling Under Flanders)	50
Belgium (Ultratip Bubbling Under Wallonia)	37
Belgium Urban (Ultratop Flanders)	23
Brazil (Brasil Hot 100 Airplay)	42
Canada Hot 100 (Billboard)	27
Canada CHR/Top 40 (Billboard)	22
Canada Hot AC (Billboard)	27
Denmark (Tracklisten)	9
France (SNEP)	41
Hong Kong (Metro Radio)	13
Ireland (IRMA)	86
Italy (FIMI)	74
Japan (Japan Hot 100)	77
Japan (Adult Contemporary)	20
Netherlands (Dutch Top 40 Tipparade)	20
Netherlands (Single Top 100)	68
New Zealand (Recorded Music NZ)	10
Scottish Singles Sales (Official Charts)	27
Slovakia Airplay (ČNS IFPI)	65
South Africa (EMA)	5
South Korea International (Circle)	5
Spain (Promusicae)	22
Sweden (DigiListan)	12
UK Singles (Official Charts)	22
UK Hip Hop/R&B (Official Charts)	4
UK Urban Club (Music Week)	1
US Billboard Hot 100	15
US Adult Contemporary (Billboard)	23
US Adult Pop Airplay (Billboard)	30
US Hot R&B/Hip-Hop Songs (Billboard)	3
US Pop Airplay (Billboard)	15
US Rhythmic Airplay (Billboard)	10

=== Year-end charts ===
Chart (2013)	Position
Australia (ARIA)	81
Australia (ARIA Urban)	13
UK Singles (OCC)	116
US Billboard Hot 100	81
US Hot R&B/Hip Hop Songs (Billboard)	22

== Certifications ==
Region	Certification	Certified units/sales
Australia (ARIA)	Platinum	70,000^{^}
New Zealand (RMNZ)	2× Platinum	60,000^{‡}
United Kingdom (BPI)	Silver	200,000^{‡}
United States (RIAA)	2× Platinum	2,000,000^{‡}
Streaming
Denmark (IFPI Danmark)	Gold	900,000^{†}
^{^} Shipments figures based on certification alone.^{‡} Sales+streaming figures based on certification alone.^{†} Streaming-only figures based on certification alone.

== Radio and release history ==
Country	Date	Format	Version	Label
United States	May 7, 2013	Digital download	Original	Island; Universal
United States	May 7, 2013	Rhythmic radio	Original	Island; Universal
United States	May 20, 2013	Digital download	Explicit	Island; Universal
United States	May 21, 2013	Mainstream radio	Original	Island; Universal
United States	June 27, 2013	Digital download	Remix featuring ASAP Rocky	Island; Universal
United States	July 1, 2013	Digital download	Remix featuring Young Jeezy	Island; Universal
United States	July 1, 2013	Digital download	"#Hermosa" – Spanglish version	Island; Universal
