= Mariah Carey singles discography =

Singles by American singer-songwriter

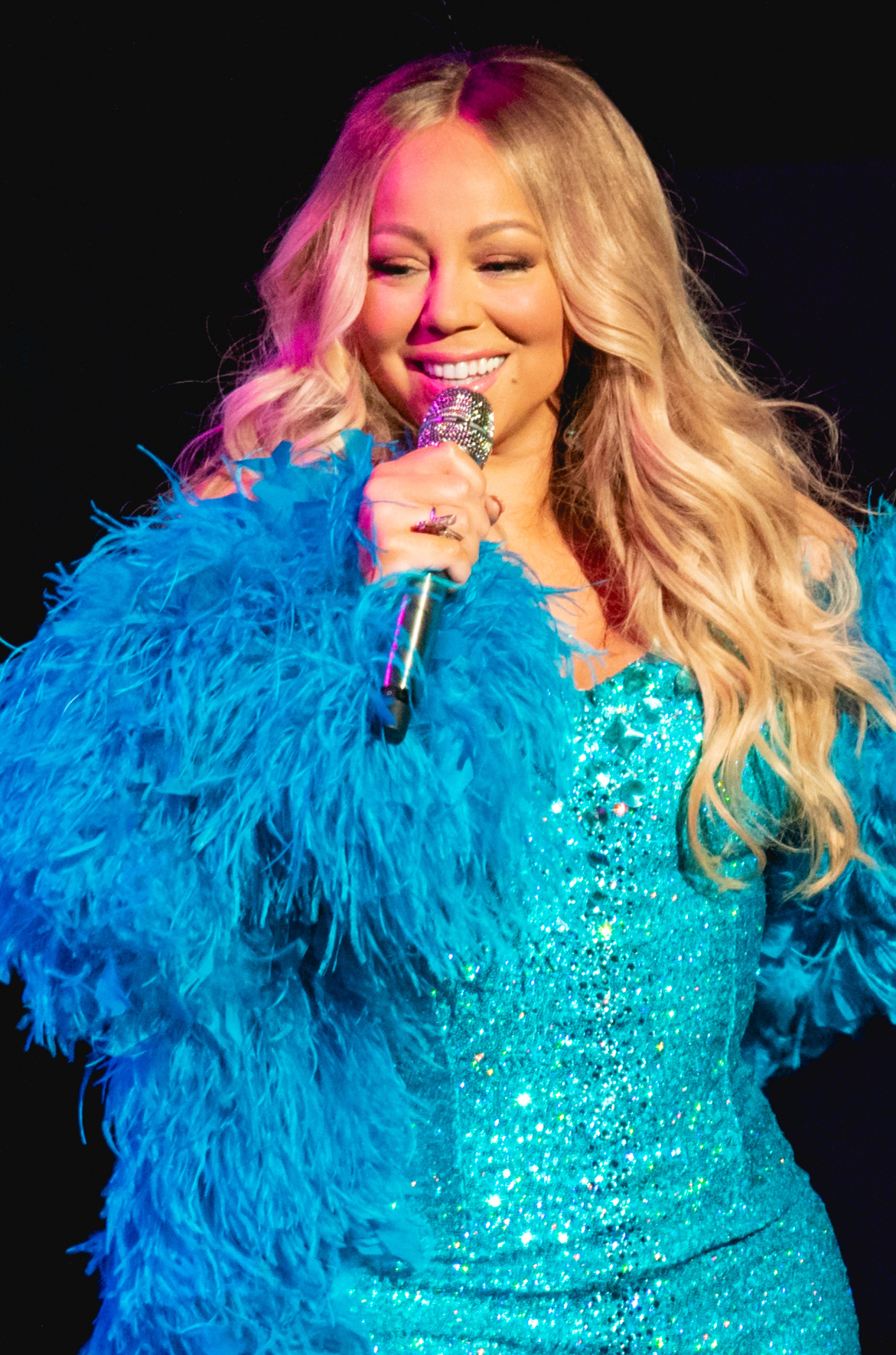
- Carey performing songs from Glitter on her Caution World Tour in 2019
- Singles: 88
- Promotional singles: 25

American singer-songwriter Mariah Carey has released 90 official singles, 25 promotional singles, and has made 30 guest appearances. Throughout her career, she has earned 19 number-one singles on the Billboard Hot 100, the most among soloists, with the songs "Vision of Love", "Love Takes Time", "Someday", "I Don't Wanna Cry", "Emotions", "I'll Be There", "Dreamlover", "Hero", "Fantasy", "One Sweet Day", "Always Be My Baby", "Honey", "My All", "Heartbreaker", "Thank God I Found You", "We Belong Together", "Don't Forget About Us", "Touch My Body" and "All I Want for Christmas Is You". In 2009, it was reported that Carey has sold 17.2 million physical singles and 13.8 million digital tracks in the United States. (Note: As per reports from Nielsen SoundScan.)

From 1990 to 1991, Carey became the first and only artist to have their first five singles reach number-one on the Hot 100, losing the streak with her song "Can't Let Go" which peaked at number two. In 1993, Carey found international success after her cover of Harry Nilsson's "Without You", became her first number-one single in several countries across Europe. In 1994, she released her first Christmas album which produced Carey's perennial yule-tide classic "All I Want for Christmas Is You". The song is one of the best-selling singles of all time, and topped the Hot 100 during the Christmas seasons from 2019 to 2025. In 1995, Carey released the number-one single "One Sweet Day" with Boyz II Men. The single found commercial success spending sixteen weeks atop the Hot 100, and held the record for the most weeks at number-one until 2019. (Note: Surpassed by "Old Town Road" by Lil Nas X and Billy Ray Cyrus, and attributed to Billboard.)

In following years, Carey released various singles including "Against All Odds (Take a Look at Me Now)" with Westlife in 1999 which became her second chart-topping single in the UK. Following a tumultuous period in the singer's personal life, her ensuing soundtrack and album, Glitter (2001) and Charmbracelet (2002) respectively, failed to gain significant commercial traction, and led to a series of mildly-successful singles. Her highest peak during this time was with the Glitter single "Loverboy", which peaked at number two on the Hot 100. In 2005 Carey released a come-back album, The Emancipation of Mimi, which saw her earn multiple successful singles including "We Belong Together" which became her strongest international showing in years, topping the Hot 100 for 14 weeks, and breaking several radio airplay records. The song was also listed as the most successful song of the 2000s decade. In the 2010s and 2020s, Carey's singles have seen some success with "#Beautiful" peaking at number 15 and "Oh Santa!" at number 75 in their respective decades. She also featured on various singles including Ariana Grande's "Yes, And?" and Latto's "Big Energy". In 2025, she released the single "Type Dangerous" which became her 50th entry on the Hot 100. (Note: As per Billboard.)

== As lead artist ==
=== 1990s ===
List of singles as lead artist, with selected chart positions and certifications, showing year released and album name
Title	Year	Peak chart positions										Sales (Note: Pure sales and not equivalent units (streaming and song downloads).)	Certifications	Album
Title	Year	US	US AC	US R&B /HH	AUS	CAN	FRA	GER	NLD	NZ	UK	Sales	Certifications	Album
"Vision of Love"	1990	1	1	1	9	1	25	17	8	1	9	US: 500,000+ (Note: United States sales figures for "Vision of Love" as of August 1990.); UK: 198,000 (Note: United Kingdom sales figures for "Vision of Love" as of November 2018.)	RIAA: Platinum; ARIA: Gold; RMNZ: Gold	Mariah Carey
"Love Takes Time"	1990	1	1	1	14	2	—	57	24	9	37	US: 500,000+ (Note: United States sales figures for "Love Takes Time" as of November 1990.)	RIAA: Platinum; ARIA: Gold	Mariah Carey
"Someday"	1991	1	5	3	44	1	38	—	21	14	38	US: 500,000+ (Note: United States sales figures for "Someday" as of March 1991.)	RIAA: Gold	Mariah Carey
"I Don't Wanna Cry"	1991	1	1	2	49	2	—	—	—	13	—		RIAA: Gold	Mariah Carey
"There's Got to Be a Way" (Note: "There's Got to Be a Way" was only released as a single in the UK and NLD.)	1991	—	—	—	—	—	—	—	—	—	54			Mariah Carey
"Emotions"	1991	1	3	1	11	1	—	39	13	3	17	UK: 137,000 (Note: United Kingdom sales figures for "Emotions" as of November 2018.)	RIAA: Platinum; ARIA: Gold; BPI: Silver; RMNZ: Gold	Emotions
"Can't Let Go"	1991	2	1	2	63	3	—	—	77	21	20		RIAA: Gold	Emotions
"Make It Happen"	1992	5	13	7	35	7	—	74	59	—	17			Emotions
"I'll Be There" (featuring Trey Lorenz)	1992	1	1	11	9	1	16	33	1	1	2	FRA: 50,000 (Note: France sales figures for "I'll Be There" as of 1993.); UK: 345,000 (Note: United Kingdom sales figures for "I'll Be There" as of April 2010.)	RIAA: Gold; ARIA: Platinum; RMNZ: Gold	MTV Unplugged
"If It's Over"	1992	—	—	—	115	—	—	—	80	—	—			MTV Unplugged
"Dreamlover"	1993	1	2	2	7	1	49	39	9	2	9	US: 935,000 (Note: United States sales figures for "Dreamlover" as of February 2014.); UK: 150,000 (Note: United Kingdom sales figures for "Dreamlover" as of April 2010.)	RIAA: Platinum; ARIA: 6× Platinum; MC: Gold; RMNZ: Gold	Music Box
"Hero"	1993	1	2	5	7	3	5	41	13	2	7	US: 1,813,000 (Note: United States sales figures for "Hero" as of February 2014.); FRA: 150,000 (Note: France sales figures for "Hero" as of 1994.); UK: 270,000 (Note: United Kingdom sales figures for "Hero" as of April 2010.)	RIAA: 3× Platinum; ARIA: 2× Platinum; BPI: Gold; MC: Platinum; RMNZ: Platinum; SNEP: Gold	Music Box
"Without You"	1994	3	4	7	3	4	2	1	1	1	1	US: 600,000 (Note: United States sales figures for "Without You/Never Forget You" as of January 1995.); FRA: 250,000 (Note: France sales figures for "Without You" as of 1994.); UK: 548,000 (Note: United Kingdom sales figures for "Without You" as of November 2018.)	RIAA: Platinum; ARIA: 2× Platinum; BPI: Platinum; BVMI: Platinum; MC: Gold; NVPI: Platinum; RMNZ: Gold; SNEP: Gold	Music Box
"Never Forget You"	1994	3	—	7	—	—	—	—	—	—	—	US: 600,000 (Note: United States sales figures for "Without You/Never Forget You" as of January 1995.)		Music Box
"Anytime You Need a Friend"	1994	12	5	22	12	5	12	41	11	5	8	FRA: 50,000 (Note: France sales figures for "Anytime You Need a Friend" as of 1994.); UK: 100,000 (Note: United Kingdom sales figures for "Anytime You Need a Friend" as of April 2010.)	ARIA: Gold; BPI: Silver; RMNZ: Gold; RIAA: Gold	Music Box
"Endless Love" (with Luther Vandross)	1994	2	11	7	2	6	12	14	6	1	3	FRA: 50,000 (Note: France sales figures for "Endless Love" as of 1994.); UK: 230,000 (Note: United Kingdom sales figures for "Endless Love" as of April 2010.)	RIAA: Platinum; ARIA: Platinum; BPI: Gold; RMNZ: Platinum	Songs
"All I Want for Christmas Is You"	1994	1	6	— (Note: "All I Want for Christmas is You" did not enter the Hot R&B/Hip-Hop Songs chart, but peaked at number 4 on the R&B/Hip-Hop Digital Song Sales chart.)	1	1	1	1	1	1	1	US: 3,700,000 (Note: United States sales figures for "All I Want for Christmas Is You" as of December 2021.); UK: 1,240,000 (Note: United Kingdom sales figures for "All I Want for Christmas Is You" as of December 2020.)	RIAA: 18× Platinum; ARIA: 13× Platinum; BPI: 10× Platinum; BVMI: 7× Gold; MC: Diamond; RMNZ: 6× Platinum	Merry Christmas
"Miss You Most (At Christmas Time)"	1994	—	—	—	—	—	—	—	—	—	—			Merry Christmas
"Fantasy"	1995	1	8	1	1	1	5	17	10	1	4	US: 2,245,000 (Note: United States sales figures for "Fantasy" as of February 2014.); FRA: 150,000 (Note: France sales figures for "Fantasy" as of 1995.); UK: 479,000 (Note: United Kingdom sales figures for "Fantasy" as of November 2018.)	RIAA: 8× Platinum; ARIA: 3× Platinum; BPI: 2× Platinum; RMNZ: 4× Platinum; SNEP: Gold	Daydream
"One Sweet Day" (with Boyz II Men)	1995	1	1	2	2	1	5	25	2	1	6	US: 2,335,000 (Note: United States sales figures for "One Sweet Day" as of February 2014.); FRA: 200,000 (Note: France sales figures for "One Sweet Day" as of 1996.); UK: 255,000 (Note: United Kingdom sales figures for "One Sweet Day" as of April 2010.)	RIAA: 4× Platinum; ARIA: 3× Platinum; BPI: Gold; RMNZ: Platinum; SNEP: Gold	Daydream
"Joy to the World"	1995	—	—	—	33	—	—	—	—	—	—			Merry Christmas
"Open Arms"	1995	—	—	—	27	—	29	65	15	8	4	UK: 105,000 (Note: United Kingdom sales figures for "Open Arms" as of April 2010.)		Daydream
"Always Be My Baby"	1996	1	2	1	17	1	—	76	27	5	3	US: 2,144,000 (Note: United States sales figures for "Always Be My Baby" as of February 2014.); UK: 220,000 (Note: United Kingdom sales figures for "Always Be My Baby" as of April 2010.)	RIAA: 7× Platinum; ARIA: 2× Platinum; BPI: Platinum; RMNZ: 3× Platinum	Daydream
"Forever"	1996	— (Note: "Forever" was ineligible to enter the Billboard Hot 100, but peaked at number 9 on the Radio Songs chart.)	2	—	77	11	—	—	47	40	—			Daydream
"Honey"	1997	1	—	2	8	1	39	38	15	3	3	US: 1,276,000 (Note: United States sales figures for "Honey" as of February 2014.); UK: 165,000 (Note: United Kingdom sales figures for "Honey" as of April 2010.)	RIAA: 2× Platinum; ARIA: Platinum; BPI: Silver; MC: Gold; RMNZ: Gold	Butterfly
"Butterfly"	1997	— (Note: "Butterfly" was ineligible to enter the Billboard Hot 100, but peaked at number 16 on the Radio Songs chart.)	11	— (Note: "Butterfly" did not enter the Hot R&B/Hip-Hop Songs chart, but peaked at number 27 on the R&B/Hip-Hop Airplay chart.)	27	22	43	76	52	15	22			Butterfly
"The Roof (Back in Time)"	1998	—	—	—	—	—	—	—	63	—	87			Butterfly
"Breakdown" (featuring Krayzie Bone and Wish Bone)	1998	— (Note: "Breakdown" was ineligible to enter the Billboard Hot 100, but peaked at number 53 on the Radio Songs chart.)	—	4	38	—	—	—	—	4	98		RIAA: Gold; RMNZ: Gold	Butterfly
"My All"	1998	1	18	4	39	28	6	30	32	21	4	US: 1,484,000 (Note: United States sales figures for "My All" as of February 2014.); UK: 160,000 (Note: United Kingdom sales figures for "My All" as of April 2010.)	RIAA: 2× Platinum; ARIA: Gold; BPI: Gold; SNEP: Gold; RMNZ: Gold	Butterfly
"Sweetheart" (with JD)	1998	— (Note: "Sweetheart" did not enter the Billboard Hot 100, but peaked at number 25 on the Bubbling Under Hot 100 Singles chart.)	—	— (Note: "Sweetheart" did not enter the Hot R&B/Hip-Hop Songs chart, but peaked at number 45 on the R&B/Hip-Hop Airplay chart.)	—	—	—	15	22	—	—			Life in 1472 and #1's
"When You Believe" (with Whitney Houston)	1998	15	3	33	13	20	5	8	4	8	4	UK: 260,000 (Note: United Kingdom sales figures for "When You Believe" as of April 2010.)	RIAA: Platinum; ARIA: Gold; BPI: Platinum; BVMI: Gold; RMNZ: Gold; SNEP: Gold	#1's
"I Still Believe"	1999	4	8	3	54	21	33	58	51	24	16	US: 860,000 (Note: United States sales figures for "I Still Believe" as of February 2014.)	RIAA: Platinum	#1's
"Heartbreaker" (featuring Jay-Z)	1999	1	—	1	10	5	4	9	7	1	5	US: 855,000 (Note: United States sales figures for "Heartbreaker" as of February 2014.); FRA: 41,309 (Note: France sales figures for "Heartbreaker" as of December 2009.); UK: 190,000 (Note: United Kingdom sales figures for "Heartbreaker" as of April 2010.)	RIAA: 2× Platinum; ARIA: Platinum; BPI: Gold; RMNZ: Platinum; SNEP: Gold	Rainbow
"Thank God I Found You" (featuring Joe and 98 Degrees)	1999	1	—	1	27	—	28	28	23	34	10	US: 687,000 (Note: United States sales figures for "Thank God I Found You" as of February 2014.); FRA: 40,871 (Note: France sales figures for "Thank God I Found You" as of December 2009.); UK: 75,000 (Note: United Kingdom sales figures for "Thank God I Found You" as of 2000.)	RIAA: Platinum	Rainbow
"—" denotes releases that did not chart in that territory.

=== 2000s ===
List of singles as lead artist, with selected chart positions and certifications, showing year released and album name
Title	Year	Peak chart positions										Sales	Certifications	Album
Title	Year	US	US Dance	US R&B /HH	AUS	CAN	FRA	GER	NLD	NZ	UK	Sales	Certifications	Album
"Crybaby" (featuring Snoop Dogg)	2000	28	—	23	—	—	—	—	—	—	—	US: 54,000 (Note: United States first week sales figures for "Crybaby".)		Rainbow
"Can't Take That Away (Mariah's Theme)"	2000	—	6	—	—	—	—	—	65	—	—			Rainbow
"Against All Odds (Take a Look at Me Now)" (solo or featuring Westlife)	2000	—	—	—	52	—	18	29	20	—	1	FRA: 59,052 (Note: France sales figures for "Against All Odds (Take a Look at Me Now)" as of December 2009.); UK: 507,000 (Note: United Kingdom sales figures for "Against All Odds (Take a Look at Me Now)" as of November 2021.)	BPI: Platinum	Rainbow
"Loverboy" (featuring Cameo)	2001	2	45	1	7	3	54	57	34	—	12	US: 571,000 (Note: United States sales figures for "Loverboy" as of December 2001.)	RIAA: Gold; ARIA: Gold	Glitter
"Reflections (Care Enough)"	2001	—	—	—	—	—	—	—	—	—	—			Glitter
"Never Too Far"	2001	— (Note: "Never Too Far" did not enter the Billboard Hot 100, but peaked at number 5 on the Bubbling Under Hot 100 Singles chart.)	—	—	36	—	—	97	67	—	32			Glitter
"Don't Stop (Funkin' 4 Jamaica)" (featuring Mystikal)	2001	— (Note: "Don't Stop (Funkin' 4 Jamaica)" did not enter the Billboard Hot 100, but peaked at number 23 on the Bubbling Under Hot 100 Singles chart.)	—	42	36	—	—	97	67	—	32			Glitter
"Never Too Far/Hero Medley"	2001	81	—	66	—	—	—	—	—	—	—			Greatest Hits
"Through the Rain"	2002	81	1	69	15	5	22	36	9	37	8	FRA: 113,254 (Note: France sales figures for "Through the Rain" as of December 2009.)	MC: Gold	Charmbracelet
"Boy (I Need You)" (featuring Cam'ron)	2002	— (Note: "Boy (I Need You)" did not enter the Billboard Hot 100, but peaked at number 57 on the Hot 100 Singles Sales chart.)	—	68	29	—	51	73	35	45	17			Charmbracelet
"I Know What You Want" (with Busta Rhymes featuring The Flipmode Squad)	2003	3	—	2	3	5	25	9	4	7	3	FRA: 26,130 (Note: France sales figures for "I Know What You Want" as of December 2009.); UK: 175,000 (Note: United Kingdom sales figures for "I Know What You Want" as of April 2010.)	RIAA: Platinum; ARIA: Platinum; BPI: Platinum; BVMI: Gold; RMNZ: 2× Platinum	It Ain't Safe No More
"Bringin' On the Heartbreak"	2003	—	5	—	—	—	—	—	—	—	—			Charmbracelet
"It's Like That"	2005	16	1	17	9	—	16	14	13	21	4	FRA: 28,635 (Note: France sales figures for "It's Like That" as of December 2009.)	RIAA: Platinum; ARIA: Gold; BPI: Silver; RMNZ: Gold	The Emancipation of Mimi
"We Belong Together"	2005	1	1	1	1	—	12	11	3	2	2	US: 1,679,000 (Note: United States sales figures for "We Belong Together" as of February 2014.); FRA: 50,064 (Note: France sales figures for "We Belong Together" as of December 2009.); UK: 474,000 (Note: United Kingdom sales figures for "We Belong Together" as of November 2018.)	RIAA: 7× Platinum; ARIA: Platinum; BPI: 2× Platinum; RMNZ: 4× Platinum	The Emancipation of Mimi
"Shake It Off"	2005	2	23	2	6	—	—	—	—	5	9	US: 829,000 (Note: United States sales figures for "Shake It Off" as of February 2014.)	RIAA: 2× Platinum; ARIA: Gold; RMNZ: Platinum	The Emancipation of Mimi
"Get Your Number" (featuring Jermaine Dupri)	2005	—	—	—	19	—	—	27	10	14	9			The Emancipation of Mimi
"Don't Forget About Us"	2005	1	1	1	12	—	—	41	27	12	11		RIAA: Platinum	The Emancipation of Mimi
"Fly Like a Bird"	2006	— (Note: "Fly Like a Bird" did not enter the Billboard Hot 100, but peaked at number 4 on the Bubbling Under Hot 100 Singles chart.)	—	19	—	—	—	—	—	—	—			The Emancipation of Mimi
"Say Somethin'" (featuring Snoop Dogg)	2006	79	1	—	26	—	—	63	—	—	27			The Emancipation of Mimi
"Touch My Body"	2008	1	1	2	17	2	16	7	20	3	5	US: 1,622,000 (Note: United States sales figures for "Touch My Body" as of February 2014.); FRA: 14,380 (Note: France sales figures for "Touch My Body" as of December 2009.); UK: 120,000 (Note: United Kingdom sales figures for "Touch My Body" as of April 2010.)	RIAA: 3× Platinum; BPI: Gold; RMNZ: 2× Platinum	E=MC²
"Bye Bye"	2008	19	—	33	53	34	—	70	—	7	30	US: 598,000 (Note: United States sales figures for "Bye Bye" as of February 2014.)	RIAA: Platinum; RMNZ: Gold	E=MC²
"I'll Be Lovin' U Long Time"	2008	58	—	36	—	69	—	—	—	—	84			E=MC²
"Right to Dream"	2008	—	—	—	—	—	—	—	—	—	—			Non-album single
"I Stay in Love"	2008	—	1	81	—	—	—	—	—	—	95			E=MC²
"Obsessed"	2009	7	1	12	13	15	8	—	61	21	52	US: 1,764,000 (Note: United States sales figures for "Obsessed" as of February 2014.); FRA: 26,503 (Note: France sales figures for "Obsessed" as of December 2009.)	RIAA: 4× Platinum; ARIA: Gold; BPI: Platinum; RMNZ: 2× Platinum	Memoirs of an Imperfect Angel
"I Want to Know What Love Is"	2009	60	2	40	45	57	6	37	—	—	19	FRA: 40,856 (Note: France sales figures for "I Want to Know What Love Is" as of December 2009.)		Memoirs of an Imperfect Angel
"H.A.T.E.U."	2009	—	—	72	—	—	—	—	—	—	—			Memoirs of an Imperfect Angel
"—" denotes releases that did not chart in that territory.

=== 2010s ===
List of singles as lead artist, with selected chart positions and certifications, showing year released and album name
Title	Year	Peak chart positions										Sales	Certifications	Album
Title	Year	US	US AC	US R&B /HH	AUS	CAN	FRA	JPN	NZ	SPA	UK	Sales	Certifications	Album
"Up Out My Face" (featuring Nicki Minaj)	2010	100	—	39	—	—	—	—	—	—	—		RIAA: Gold	Memoirs of an Imperfect Angel
"Angels Cry" (featuring Ne-Yo)	2010	—	26	90	—	—	—	89	—	—	81			Memoirs of an Imperfect Angel
"Oh Santa!"	2010	100	1	— (Note: "Oh Santa!" did not enter the Hot R&B/Hip-Hop Songs chart, but peaked at number 40 on the R&B/Hip-Hop Digital Song Sales chart.)	—	73	—	26	—	—	—			Merry Christmas II You
"Auld Lang Syne (The New Year's Anthem)"	2010	—	—	— (Note: "Auld Lang Syne (The New Year's Anthem)" did not enter the Hot R&B/Hip-Hop Songs chart, but peaked at number 7 on the Hot R&B/Hip-Hop Singles Sales chart.)	—	—	—	—	—	—	—			Merry Christmas II You
"When Christmas Comes" (with John Legend)	2011	—	—	59	—	—	—	57	—	—	—			Merry Christmas II You
"All I Want for Christmas Is You (SuperFestive!)" (with Justin Bieber)	2011	86	3	— (Note: "All I Want for Christmas Is You (SuperFestive!)" did not enter the Hot R&B/Hip-Hop Songs chart, but peaked at number 15 on the R&B/Hip-Hop Digital Song Sales chart.)	—	61	—	19	—	34	148		RIAA: Gold; ARIA: Gold	Under the Mistletoe
"Triumphant (Get 'Em)" (featuring Rick Ross and Meek Mill)	2012	— (Note: "Triumphant (Get 'Em)" did not enter the Billboard Hot 100, but peaked at number 15 on the Bubbling Under Hot 100 Singles chart.)	—	53	—	—	—	48	—	36	144	US: 71,000 (Note: United States sales figures for "Triumphant (Get 'Em)" as of February 2014.)		Non-album singles
"Almost Home"	2013	—	20	— (Note: "Almost Home" did not enter the Hot R&B/Hip-Hop Songs chart, but peaked at number 1 on the Bubbling Under R&B/Hip-Hop Songs chart.)	—	—	185	59	—	41	—	US: 48,000 (Note: United States sales figures for "Almost Home" as of February 2014.)		Non-album singles
"#Beautiful" (featuring Miguel)	2013	15	23	3	6	27	41	77	10	22	22	US: 1,185,000 (Note: United States sales figures for "#Beautiful" as of February 2014.)	RIAA: 2× Platinum; ARIA: Platinum; BPI: Silver; RMNZ: 2× Platinum	Me. I Am Mariah… The Elusive Chanteuse
"The Art of Letting Go"	2013	— (Note: "The Art of Letting Go" did not enter the Billboard Hot 100, but peaked at number 19 on the Bubbling Under Hot 100 Singles chart.)	—	46	82	—	84	—	—	29	90	US: 32,000 (Note: United States sales figures for "The Art of Letting Go" as of February 2014.)		Me. I Am Mariah… The Elusive Chanteuse
"You're Mine (Eternal)"	2014	88	26	24	—	—	96	91	—	21	87	US: 56,000 (Note: United States sales figures for "You're Mine (Eternal)" as of April 2014.)		Me. I Am Mariah… The Elusive Chanteuse
"You Don't Know What to Do" (featuring Wale)	2014	—	—	—	—	—	—	—	—	—	—			Me. I Am Mariah… The Elusive Chanteuse
"Infinity"	2015	82	—	28	—	—	85	43	—	18	154	US: 26,000 (Note: United States first week sales figures for "Infinity".)		#1 to Infinity
"I Don't" (featuring YG)	2017	89	—	35	—	96	102	—	—	—	— (Note: "I Don't" did not enter the UK Singles Chart, but peaked at number 60 on the UK Singles Downloads Chart.)			Non-album single
"With You"	2018	—	7	— (Note: "With You" did not enter the Hot R&B/Hip-Hop Songs chart, but peaked at number 22 on the R&B/Hip-Hop Digital Song Sales chart.)	—	—	— (Note: "With You" did not enter the Top Singles (Downloads+Streaming), but peaked at number 125 on the Downloads chart.)	—	—	—	—			Caution
"A No No"	2019	—	—	—	—	—	—	—	—	—	—			Caution
"In the Mix"	2019	—	—	—	—	—	—	—	—	—	—			Non-album single
"—" denotes releases that did not chart in that territory.

=== 2020s ===
List of singles as lead artist, with selected chart positions and certifications, showing year released and album name
Title	Year	Peak chart positions										Certifications	Album
Title	Year	US	US R&B /HH	AUS	CAN	GER	HUN	IRE	JPN Over.	NZ Hot	UK	Certifications	Album
"Save the Day" (with Lauryn Hill)	2020	— (Note: "Save the Day" did not enter the Billboard Hot 100, but peaked at number 15 on the Digital Song Sales chart.)	— (Note: "Save The Day" did not enter the Hot R&B/Hip-Hop Songs chart, but peaked at number 15 on the R&B/Hip-Hop Digital Song Sales chart.)	—	—	—	23	—	—	—	— (Note: "Save the Day" did not enter the UK Singles Chart, but peaked at number 36 on the UK Singles Downloads Chart.)		The Rarities
"Out Here on My Own"	2020	—	—	—	—	—	—	—	—	—	—		The Rarities
"Oh Santa!" (featuring Ariana Grande and Jennifer Hudson)	2020	76	20	—	60	53	—	70	8	—	50		Mariah Carey's Magical Christmas Special
"Fall in Love at Christmas" (with Khalid and Kirk Franklin)	2021	— (Note: "Fall in Love at Christmas" did not enter the Billboard Hot 100, but peaked at number 24 on the Digital Song Sales chart.)	— (Note: "Fall in Love at Christmas" did not enter the Hot R&B/Hip-Hop Songs chart, but peaked at number 5 on the R&B/Hip-Hop Digital Song Sales chart.)	—	—	—	19	—	9	—	— (Note: "Fall in Love at Christmas" did not enter the UK Singles Chart, but peaked at number 57 on the UK Singles Downloads Chart.)		Non-album single
"Big Energy" (remix) (with Latto featuring DJ Khaled)	2022	— (Note: "Big Energy (remix)" did not enter the Billboard Hot 100, but peaked at number one on the Digital Song Sales chart.)	—	6	—	—	—	20	—	20	21	ARIA: 3× Platinum; BPI: Platinum	777
"Yes, And?" (remix) (with Ariana Grande)	2024	—	—	—	—	—	—	—	3	10	—		Eternal Sunshine (Slightly Deluxe)
"Type Dangerous"	2025	95	24	— (Note: "Type Dangerous" did not enter the ARIA Chart, but debuted at number 4 on the ARIA Digital Track Chart.)	—	— (Note: "Type Dangerous" did not enter the German Top 100 Singles chart, but peaked at number 1 on the Deutsche Urban Charts.)	—	—	12	15	— (Note: "Type Dangerous" did not enter the UK Singles Chart, but debuted at number 8 on the UK Singles Downloads Chart, and at number 9 on the UK Singles Sales Chart.)		Here for It All
"Sugar Sweet" (featuring Shenseea and Kehlani)	2025	—	— (Note: "Sugar Sweet" did not enter the Hot R&B/Hip-Hop Songs chart, but peaked at number 2 on the R&B/Hip-Hop Digital Song Sales chart and number 23 on the R&B/Hip-Hop Airplay chart.)	— (Note: "Sugar Sweet" did not enter the ARIA Chart, but debuted at number 49 on the ARIA Digital Track Chart.)	—	—	—	—	17	16	— (Note: "Sugar Sweet" did not enter the UK Singles Chart Top 100, but debuted at number 41 on the UK Singles Sales Chart, and at number 38 on the UK Singles Downloads Chart, on August 1, 2025.)		Here for It All
"Play This Song" (featuring Anderson .Paak)	2025	—	— (Note: "Play This Song" did not enter the Hot R&B/Hip-Hop Songs chart, but peaked at number 11 on the US Hot R&B Songs chart and number 12 on the R&B/Hip-Hop Digital Song Sales chart.)	—	—	— (Note: "Play This Song" did not enter the German Top 100 Singles chart, but peaked at number 2 on the Deutsche Urban Charts.)	—	—	5	36	—		Here for It All
"Nothing Is Impossible"	2026	—	—	—	—	—	—	—	—	—	—		Here for It All
"In Your Feelings"	2026	—	— (Note: "In Your Feelings" did not enter the Hot R&B/Hip-Hop Songs chart, but peaked at number 12 on the R&B/Hip-Hop Airplay chart and number 21 on the Hot R&B Songs chart.)	—	—	—	—	—	—	—	—		Here for It All
"Jesus I Do" (featuring the Clark Sisters)	2026	—	—	—	—	—	—	—	—	—	—		Here for It All
"—" denotes releases that did not chart in that territory.

== As featured artist ==
List of singles as featured artist, with selected chart positions, showing year released and album name
Title	Year	Peak chart positions					Album
Title	Year	US	US R&B /HH	US Adult R&B	FRA	NZ	Album
"Things That U Do" (Jay-Z featuring Mariah Carey)	2000	—	— (Note: "Things That U Do" did not enter the Hot R&B/Hip-Hop Songs chart, but peaked at number 20 on the Bubbling Under R&B/Hip-Hop Songs chart.)	—	—	—	Vol. 3... Life and Times of S. Carter
"U Make Me Wanna" (Jadakiss featuring Mariah Carey)	2004	21	8	—	55	—	Kiss of Death
"So Lonely" (Twista featuring Mariah Carey)	2006	— (Note: "So Lonely" did not enter the Billboard Hot 100, but peaked at number 14 on the Bubbling Under Hot 100 Singles chart.)	65	—	—		The Day After
"Lil' L.O.V.E." (Bone Thugs-n-Harmony featuring Mariah Carey and Bow Wow)	2007	— (Note: "Lil' L.O.V.E." did not enter the Billboard Hot 100, but peaked at number 17 on the Bubbling Under Hot 100 Singles chart.)	66	—	—	6	Strength & Loyalty
"My Love" (The-Dream featuring Mariah Carey)	2009	82	36	—	—	—	Love vs. Money
"Where I Belong" (Busta Rhymes featuring Mariah Carey)	2021	—	—	—	—	—	Extinction Level Event 2: The Wrath of God
"Somewhat Loved" (Jam & Lewis featuring Mariah Carey)	2021	—	—	9	—	—	Jam & Lewis: Volume One
"Circles" (e-lie featuring Mariah Carey)	2023	—	—	—	—	—	Non-album single
"—" denotes releases that did not chart in that territory.

== As part of a group ==
List of singles as part of a group, with selected chart positions, showing year released and album name
Title	Year	Peak chart positions							Album
Title	Year	US	US R&B /HH	AUS	CAN	NZ	SWI	UK	Album
"(You Make Me Feel Like) A Natural Woman" (as part of The Divas)	1998	—	—	—	—	—	—	—	VH1 Divas Live
"What More Can I Give" (as part of The All Stars with Michael Jackson)	2001	—	—	—	—	—	—	—	Non-album singles
"Just Stand Up!" (as part of Artists Stand Up to Cancer)	2008	11	27	39	10	19	—	26	Non-album singles
"Everybody Hurts" (as part of Helping Haiti)	2010	— (Note: "Everybody Hurts" did not enter the Billboard Hot 100, but peaked at number 21 on the Bubbling Under Hot 100 Singles chart.)	—	28	59	17	16	1	Non-album singles
"—" denotes releases that did not chart in that territory.

== Promotional singles ==
List of promotional singles, with selected chart positions, showing year released and album name
Title	Year	Peak chart positions										Certifications	Album
Title	Year	US Dig.	US AC	US Dance	US Holiday	US R&B /HH	CAN Dig.	FRA	ICE	ITA	KOR	Certifications	Album
"Till the End of Time"	1991	—	—	—	—	—	—	—	—	—	—		Emotions
"Jesus Born on This Day"	1994	—	—	—	—	—	—	—	—	—	—		Merry Christmas
"I Am Free"	1995	—	—	—	—	—	—	—	—	—	—		Daydream
"Underneath the Stars"	1996	—	—	—	—	— (Note: "Underneath the Stars" did not enter the Hot R&B/Hip-Hop Songs chart, but peaked at number 69 on the R&B/Hip-Hop Airplay chart.)	—	—	—	—	—		Daydream
"O Holy Night"	1996	—	—	—	70	—	—	42	19	28	— (Note: "O Holy Night" did not enter the South Korean main singles chart, but peaked at number 84 on the international singles chart.)	RIAA: Platinum; FIMI: Gold; MC: Platinum; RMNZ: Gold	Merry Christmas
"Do You Know Where You're Going To (Theme from Mahogany)"	1998	—	—	—	—	—	—	— (Note: "Do You Know Where You're Going To (Theme from Mahogany)" did not enter the France main singles chart, but peaked at number 10 on the airplay chart.)	—	—	—		#1's
"Last Night a DJ Saved My Life"	2001	—	—	—	—	—	—	— (Note: "Last Night a DJ Saved My Life" did not enter the France main singles chart, but peaked at number 10 on the airplay chart.)	—	—	—		Glitter
"Lead the Way"	2001	—	—	—	—	—	—	—	—	—	—		Glitter
"Yours"	2002	—	—	—	—	—	—	—	—	—	—		Charmbracelet
"My Saving Grace"	2002	—	—	—	—	—	—	—	—	—	—		Charmbracelet
"The One"	2002	—	—	—	—	—	—	—	—	—	—		Charmbracelet
"U Like This" (Megamix)	2003	—	—	38	—	—	—	—	—	—	—		Non-album single
"100%"	2010	—	—	—	—	—	—	—	—	—	—		AT&T Team USA
"One Child"	2010	—	—	—	—	—	—	—	—	—	— (Note: "One Child" did not enter the South Korean main singles chart, but peaked at number 98 on the international singles chart.)		Merry Christmas II You
"All I Want for Christmas Is You (Extra Festive)"	2010	35	—	—	80	—	30	—	—	—	82		Merry Christmas II You
"Christmas Time Is in the Air Again"	2012	—	—	—	— (Note: "Christmas Time Is in the Air Again" did not enter the Holiday 100, but peaked at number 50 on the Holiday Digital Song Sales chart.)	—	—	—	—	—	— (Note: "Christmas Time Is in the Air Again" did not enter the South Korean main singles chart, but peaked at number 57 on the international singles chart.)		Merry Christmas II You
"Thirsty"	2014	—	—	—	—	—	—	—	—	—	— (Note: "Thirsty" did not enter the South Korean main singles chart, but peaked at number 78 on the international singles chart.)		Me. I Am Mariah... The Elusive Chanteuse
"Infamous" (with Jussie Smollett)	2017	—	—	—	—	— (Note: "Infamous" did not enter the Hot R&B/Hip-Hop Songs chart, but peaked at number 23 on the R&B/Hip-Hop Digital Song Sales chart.)	—	—	—	—	—		Empire 3
"The Star"	2017	—	23	—	— (Note: "The Star" did not enter the Holiday 100, but peaked at number 6 on the Holiday Digital Song Sales chart.)	—	—	—	—	—	—		The Star: Original Motion Picture Soundtrack
"Lil Snowman"	2017	—	—	—	—	—	—	—	—	—	—		All I Want for Christmas Is You
"GTFO"	2018	—	—	—	—	— (Note: "GTFO" did not enter the Hot R&B/Hip-Hop Songs chart, but peaked at number 19 on the R&B/Hip-Hop Digital Song Sales chart.)	—	— (Note: "GTFO" did not enter the Top Singles (Downloads+Streaming), but peaked at number 98 on the Downloads chart.)	—	—	—		Caution
"The Distance" (featuring Ty Dolla $ign)	2018	—	—	—	—	—	—	—	—	—	—		Caution
"Here We Go Around Again"	2021	—	—	—	—	—	—	—	—	—	—		The Rarities
"It's a Wrap" (solo or featuring Mary J. Blige)	2023	—	—	—	—	— (Note: "It's a Wrap" did not enter the Hot R&B/Hip-Hop Songs chart, but peaked at number 22 on the R&B/Hip-Hop Digital Songs chart.)	—	—	—	—	— (Note: "It's a Wrap" did not enter the South Korean main singles chart, but peaked at number 100 on the international singles chart.)	RMNZ: Gold	Memoirs of an Imperfect Angel
"Portrait"	2024	—	—	—	—	—	—	—	—	—	—		Caution
"Didn't Mean To Turn You On" (solo or with Rochelle Jordan)	2026	—	—	—	—	—	—	—	—	—	—		Glitter (Deluxe Edition)
"—" denotes releases that did not chart in that territory.

== Other charted songs ==
List of songs with selected chart positions, showing year released and album name
Title	Year	Peak chart positions										Certifications	Album
Title	Year	US	US Dance	US Holiday	US Pop	US R&B /HH	HUN	KOR	NLD	SWI	UK	Certifications	Album
"Now That I Know"	1993	—	—	—	—	—	—	—	—	—	— (Note: "Now That I Know" did not enter the main UK singles chart, but peaked at number 86 on the UK airplay chart.)		Music Box
"Silent Night"	1994	— (Note: "Silent Night" did not enter the Billboard Hot 100, but peaked at number 67 on the Digital Songs chart.)	—	—	—	—	—	—	95	—	—	MC: Gold	Merry Christmas
"Christmas (Baby Please Come Home)"	1994	—	—	20	—	— (Note: "Christmas (Baby Please Come Home)" did not enter the Hot R&B/Hip-Hop Songs chart, but peaked at number 5 on the R&B/Hip-Hop Digital Songs chart and number 18 on the R&B/Hip-Hop Streaming Songs chart.)	— (Note: "Christmas (Baby Please Come Home)" did not enter the Single Top 40, but peaked at number 24 on the Stream Top 40 chart.)	— (Note: "Christmas (Baby Please Come Home)" did not enter the South Korean main singles chart, but peaked at number 83 on the International singles chart.)	21	50	58	RIAA: Platinum; ARIA: Gold; BPI: Gold; MC: 2× Platinum; RMNZ: Gold	Merry Christmas
"Santa Claus Is Comin' to Town"	1994	—	—	45	—	—	26	142	— (Note: "Santa Claus Is Comin' to Town" did not enter the Single Top 100, but peaked at number 9 on the Single Tip chart.)	—	—	RIAA: Gold; ARIA: Gold; MC: Gold	Merry Christmas
"Hark! The Herald Angels Sing" / "Gloria (In Excelsis Deo)"	1994	—	—	54	—	—	—	—	—	—	—	RIAA: Platinum	Merry Christmas
"When I Saw You"	1995	—	—	—	—	—	—	— (Note: "When I Saw You" did not enter the South Korean main singles chart, but peaked at number 57 on the International singles chart.)	—	—	—		Daydream
"Fly Away (Butterfly Reprise)"	1997	—	13	—	—	—	—	—	—	—	—		Butterfly
"Irresistible (Westside Connection)" (featuring Westside Connection)	2002	—	—	—	—	81	—	—	—	—	—		Charmbracelet
"What Would You Do" (Note: "What Would You Do" is an alternative version of "If We", included on Glitter.) (with Shade Sheist and Nate Dogg)	2003	—	—	—	—	57	—	—	—	—	—		Non-album song
"Mine Again"	2005	—	—	—	—	73	—	—	—	—	—		The Emancipation of Mimi
"Migrate" (featuring T-Pain)	2008	92	—	—	69	95	—	—	—	—	—		E=MC²
"Side Effects"	2008	—	—	—	93	—	—	—	—	—	—		E=MC²
"I'm That Chick"	2008	—	—	—	—	82	—	—	—	—	—		E=MC²
"Betcha Gon' Know (The Prologue)"	2009	— (Note: "Betcha Gon' Know (The Prologue)" did not enter the Billboard Hot 100, but peaked at number 1 on the Bubbling Under Hot 100 Singles chart.)	—	—	—	—	—	—	—	—	—		Memoirs of an Imperfect Angel
"Candy Bling"	2009	—	—	—	—	— (Note: "Candy Bling" did not enter the Hot R&B/Hip-Hop Songs chart, but peaked at number 1 on the Bubbling Under R&B/Hip-Hop Songs chart.)	—	—	—	—	—		Memoirs of an Imperfect Angel
"Angel (The Prelude)"	2009	—	—	—	—	— (Note: "Angel (The Prelude)" did not enter the Hot R&B/Hip-Hop Songs chart, but peaked at number 8 on the R&B/Hip-Hop Digital Song Sales chart.)	—	—	—	—	— (Note: "Angel (The Prelude)" did not enter the UK Singles Chart, but peaked at number 51 on the UK Singles Sales Chart.)		Memoirs of an Imperfect Angel
"Santa Claus Is Coming to Town" (Intro)	2010	—	—	—	—	—	—	— (Note: "Santa Claus Is Coming to Town" (Intro) did not enter the South Korean main singles chart, but peaked at number 52 on the international singles chart.)	—	—	—		Merry Christmas II You
"O Little Town of Bethlehem" / "Little Drummer Boy"	2010	—	—	— (Note: "O Little Town of Bethlehem" / "Little Drummer Boy" did not enter the Holiday 100, but peaked at number 44 on the Holiday Digital Song Sales chart.)	—	—	—	— (Note: "O Little Town of Bethlehem" / "Little Drummer Boy" did not enter the South Korean main singles chart, but peaked at number 70 on the international singles chart.)	—	—	—		Merry Christmas II You
"The First Noel" / "Born Is the King" (Interlude)	2010	—	—	— (Note: "The First Noel" / "Born Is the King" (Interlude) did not enter the Holiday 100, but peaked at number 29 on the Holiday Digital Song Sales chart.)	—	—	—	— (Note: "The First Noel" / "Born Is the King" (Interlude) did not enter the South Korean main singles chart, but peaked at number 62 on the international singles chart.)	—	—	—		Merry Christmas II You
"Here Comes Santa Claus (Right Down Santa Claus Lane)" / "Housetop Celebration"	2010	—	—	—	—	—	—	— (Note: "Here Comes Santa Claus (Right Down Santa Claus Lane)" / "Housetop Celebration" did not enter the South Korean main singles chart, but peaked at number 66 on the international singles chart.)	—	—	—		Merry Christmas II You
"Charlie Brown Christmas"	2010	—	—	— (Note: "Charlie Brown Christmas" did not enter the Holiday 100, but peaked at number 9 on the Holiday Digital Song Sales chart.)	—	—	—	— (Note: "Charlie Brown Christmas" did not enter the South Korean main singles chart, but peaked at number 86 on the international singles chart.)	—	—	—		Merry Christmas II You
"O Come, All Ye Faithful" / "Hallelujah Chorus" (featuring Patricia Carey)	2010	—	—	— (Note: "O Come, All Ye Faithful" / "Hallelujah Chorus" did not enter the Holiday 100, but peaked at number 13 on the Holiday Digital Songs chart.)	—	— (Note: "O Come, All Ye Faithful" / "Hallelujah Chorus" did not enter the Hot R&B/Hip-Hop Songs chart, but peaked at number 7 on the Bubbling Under R&B/Hip-Hop Songs chart.)	—	— (Note: "O Come, All Ye Faithful" / "Hallelujah Chorus" did not enter the South Korean main singles chart, but peaked at number 93 on the international singles chart.)	—	—	—		Merry Christmas II You
"Cry."	2014	—	—	—	—	—	—	— (Note: "Cry." did not enter the South Korean main singles chart, but peaked at number 50 on the international singles chart.)	—	—	—		Me. I Am Mariah... The Elusive Chanteuse
"Faded"	2014	—	—	—	—	—	—	— (Note: "Faded" did not enter the South Korean main singles chart, but peaked at number 63 on the international singles chart.)	—	—	—		Me. I Am Mariah... The Elusive Chanteuse
"Dedicated" (featuring Nas)	2014	—	—	—	—	—	—	— (Note: "Dedicated" did not enter the South Korean main singles chart, but peaked at number 60 on the international singles chart.)	—	—	—		Me. I Am Mariah... The Elusive Chanteuse
"Money ($ * / ...)" (featuring Fabolous)	2014	—	—	—	—	—	—	— (Note: "Money ($ * / ...)" did not enter the South Korean main singles chart, but peaked at number 99 on the international singles chart.)	—	—	—		Me. I Am Mariah... The Elusive Chanteuse
"One More Try"	2014	—	—	—	—	—	—	— (Note: "One More Try" did not enter the South Korean main singles chart, but peaked at number 90 on the international singles chart.)	—	—	—		Me. I Am Mariah... The Elusive Chanteuse
"Betcha Gon' Know" (featuring R. Kelly)	2014	—	—	—	—	—	—	— (Note: "Betcha Gon' Know" did not enter the South Korean main singles chart, but peaked at number 67 on the international singles chart.)	—	—	—		Me. I Am Mariah... The Elusive Chanteuse
"All I Want for Christmas Is You" (Live at the Tokyo Dome)	2020	—	—	— (Note: "All I Want for Christmas Is You (Live at the Tokyo Dome)" did not enter the Holiday 100, but peaked at number 18 on the Holiday Digital Song Sales chart.)	—	—	—	—	—	—	—		The Rarities
"All I Want for Christmas Is You" (Magical Christmas Mix)	2020	—	—	— (Note: "All I Want for Christmas Is You (Magical Christmas Mix)" did not enter the Holiday 100, but peaked at number 25 on the Holiday Digital Song chart.)	—	—	—	—	—	—	—		Mariah Carey's Magical Christmas Special: Apple TV+ Original Soundtrack
"Sleigh Ride"	2020	—	—	—	—	— (Note: "Sleigh Ride" did not enter the Hot R&B/Hip-Hop Songs chart, but peaked at number 25 on the R&B/Hip-Hop Digital Songs chart.)	25	—	—	—	—		Mariah Carey's Magical Christmas Special: Apple TV+ Original Soundtrack
"We Belong Together" (Mimi's Late Night Valentine's Mix)	2021	— (Note: "We Belong Together (Mimi's Late Night Valentine's Mix)" did not enter the Billboard Hot 100, but peaked at number 45 on the Digital Songs chart.)	—	—	—	— (Note: "We Belong Together (Mimi's Late Night Valentine's Mix)" did not enter the Hot R&B/Hip-Hop Songs chart, but peaked at number 19 on the R&B/Hip-Hop Digital Songs chart.)	—	—	—	—	—		Non-album songs
"Made for Me" (remix) (with Muni Long)	2024	—	—	—	—	—	—	—	—	—	— (Note: "Made for Me" (remix) did not enter the UK Singles Chart, but peaked at number 95 on the UK Singles Downloads Chart.)		Non-album songs
"Portrait" (Hopeful Child remix)	2024	—	44	—	—	—	—	—	—	—	—		Non-album songs
"Here for It All"	2025	—	—	—	—	— (Note: "Here for It All" did not enter the Hot R&B/Hip-Hop Songs chart, but peaked at number 9 on the R&B Digital Song Sales chart.)	—	—	—	—	—		Here For It All
"—" denotes releases that did not chart in that territory.

== See also ==
- List of best-selling singles
- List of artists who reached number one in the United States
- List of artists who reached number one on the U.S. dance chart
- List of Billboard Hot 100 chart achievements and milestones
- List of best-selling singles in Japan
- List of artists who reached number one on the UK Singles Chart

== Notes ==
Notes for sources

Notes for songs

Notes for certifications and chart positions
