= Here We Go Around Again =

Promotional single by Mariah Carey

from the album The Rarities
- B-side: "Loverboy" (Firecracker – original version)
- Released: December 11, 2020
- Recorded: 1989
- Studio: Sanctuary Studios, Albany, NY
- Length: 3:55
- Label: Columbia; Legacy
- Songwriter(s): Mariah Carey; Ben Margulies
- Producer(s): Mariah Carey; Ben Margulies

Audio video
- "Here We Go Around Again" on YouTube

"Here We Go Around Again" (listed as "Here We Go Round Again" on Carey's demo tape) is a song recorded by American singer Mariah Carey. It was released in Japan on December 11, 2020, as a promotional single from her eighth compilation album, The Rarities (2020) by Columbia and Legacy Records as a cassette single with "Loverboy (Firecracker – Original Version)". The song was written and produced by Carey and Ben Margulies. According to Carey, the song was the first track on her demo tape.

== Background and release ==
"Here We Go Around Again" was recorded by Dana Jon Chappelle and mixed by Brian Garten. According to the album's liner notes, Carey "[had] always liked it and did want it to be included on my first album. I don't remember why it wasn't, except we felt that we never quite captured the magic of that first demo. This recording is as close as we got." In an interview with Fred Bronson, Margulies revealed that their first collaboration, “Here We Go Around Again,” was recorded in the back of his father's cabinetry factory in Chelsea, New York City: "It was this real Motown thing. She wrote all the verses out. We were very excited because she sounded incredible. That was the beginning of the collaborating."

"Here We Go Around Again" was first teased on August 21, 2020, on a Zoom chat with reporters, influencers and fans to promote "Save the Day". On November 19, 2020, it was announced that the song would be paired with "Loverboy (Firecracker – Original Version)" and released as a limited edition cassette single in Japan, set to be officially released on December 11, 2020. The next day, however, the cassette was made available worldwide on Carey's official online store, included in bundles with clothing items and accessories.

== Critical reception ==
Billboard writer Joe Lynch described the first teaser of "Here We Go Around Again" which was premiered on Carey's Zoom chat for "Save the Day" as "a snippet of a Jackson 5-esque song that dates back to her 1990 debut". Idolator writer Mike Wass stated was "hard to understand how something this effortlessly charming and catchy didn’t make the tracklist of Mariah’s debut album." Carey channeled The Jackson 5 on this "buoyant bop from 1990, sounding so innocent that she can barely contain the sheer joy of relishing in her own melismatic powers." Los Angeles Times pop-music critic Mikael Wood praised the song stating that her vocals were "precise as always" and praised her writing style saying that it was "already in a tune whose darting melody evokes the comings and goings of a guy who can’t make up his mind about her."

== Track listings and formats ==
- Japanese limited edition cassette single
1. "Here We Go Around Again" – 3:55
2. "Loverboy" (Firecracker – original version) – 3:17

== Charts ==
Chart (2020)	Peak position
Japan (Oricon)	56
