= Los Angeles County Raceway =

Motorsport facility in Palmdale, California, United States

Coordinates: 34.542674°N 118.009577°W

LACR, the "Ice Rink", Palmdale Dragstrip
- Location: Palmdale, California, United States
- Opened: 1964
- Closed: 2007
- Website: http://www.lacr.net

Drag Strip
- Surface: Asphalt and Concrete
- Length: 0.25 mi (0.40 km)

Los Angeles County Raceway (or "LACR") was a motorsport facility in Palmdale, California, United States. LACR's main feature was its 1/4-mile (1320 feet, 402 m) dragstrip, which first opened in 1964. LACR held its final event on July 29, 2007. The land under the track is owned by Granite Construction, Inc.

== General information ==
Los Angeles County Raceway (LACR) was an NHRA-sanctioned quarter-mile drag strip located near East Avenue T and 70th Street east in Palmdale, California.

LACR was home to many racing organizations such as SCEDA, NMRA, DHRA, ANRA, and practically every NHRA racing category. LACR was home to the annual Hangover Nationals, Fox Hunt, Rat Fink Party, and Toys for Tots. LACR was open every Wednesday and Friday night to any racer ranging from dragsters to street cars.

In 1980, the LACR was taken over by Bernie and Anne Longjohn. By 1993, the LACR was hosting 100 races a year, drawing 200,000 spectators.

LACR held its final race on the last weekend of July 2007 after Granite Construction exercised its rights to reclaim leased portions of the property for mining operations.

== Closing of LACR ==
LACR ceased operations on July 29, 2007. After 43 years, the mining company next door Granite Construction, who leased the mineral rights to the property that was leased to LACR, shut down LACR in order for mining. Within 3 months of LACR closing its doors, every building on the property had been demolished, more than half the parking lot was mined, and no pavement remained.

== In popular culture ==
- Los Angeles County Raceway has been seen in numerous movies and television shows. Hollywood movies featuring LACR include The Fast and the Furious and Ocean's Eleven.
- The Mariah Carey music video "Loverboy" was filmed at LACR.
- Mass media corporation Primedia has many of its automotive magazines based in their Los Angeles branch. Because of LACR's proximity to Los Angeles, many of these publications used Los Angeles County Raceway to perform comparison tests and to record performance data. Some of the magazines that frequented LACR were: Hot Rod Magazine; Four Wheeler, Sport Truck, Turbo, Car Craft Magazine; Chevy High Performance; 5.0 Mustang Magazine; Mustang Monthly Magazine; and Motorcyclist Magazine (all of their 1/4-mile data are recorded at LACR). Car and Driver magazine also staged many of its comparison tests at Los Angeles County Raceway (acceleration data).
