= The Rarities (Mariah Carey album) =

2020 compilation album by Mariah Carey

Compilation album by Mariah Carey
- Released: October 2, 2020
- Recorded: 1989–2020
- Venue: Tokyo Dome
- Studios: Beach House Studios (Bahamas); Conway Recording Studios (California); Crave Studios (New York); Electric Lady Studios (New York City); Germano Studios (New York); Hit Factory (New York); The Mermaid Room (New York); Plant Studios (Sausalito, California); Record Plant (Los Angeles); Right Track Studio (New York); Sanctuary Studios (Albany, New York); Southside Studios (California); Summertime Studio (New York)
- Genres: R&B; soul
- Length: 136:25
- Labels: Columbia; Legacy
- Producers: Mariah Carey; Ben Margulies; Walter Afanasieff; Cory Rooney; Mark Morales; Jermaine Dupri; Dave Hall; Clark Kent; Kenneth Crouch; Manuel Seal; Loris Holland; Randy Jackson

Mariah Carey chronology
| Caution (2018) | The Rarities (2020) | Mariah Carey's Magical Christmas Special (2020) |

Singles from The Rarities
- 1. "Save the Day" Released: August 21, 2020; 2. "Out Here on My Own" Released: September 18, 2020

The Rarities is the seventh compilation album by American R&B singer Mariah Carey, released on October 2, 2020, by Columbia Records and Legacy Recordings. The album coincided with Carey's 2020 memoir The Meaning of Mariah Carey, which discussed various songs on the albums, their meanings and stories. The album was released as a part of "#MC30", a promotional marking campaign which marked the 30th anniversary of Carey's self-titled debut album.

Supported by the singles "Save the Day", "Out Here on My Own" and the promotional single "Here We Go Around Again", the first of two discs on the album featured a mix of b-sides and previously unreleased material from Carey's discography. The second disc included audio from her live performance at the Tokyo Dome on March 7, 1996, during her Daydream World Tour. A Blu-ray disc featuring enhanced video footage from the concert was released exclusively in Japan. Upon release, the album received positive reviews and debuted at number 31 on the Billboard 200, while reaching the top 20 in Australia and Spain, and the top 40 in Croatia, Japan, Poland, Scotland, Switzerland and Wallonia.

== Background ==
To celebrate and promote the 30th anniversary of her self-titled debut studio album, Mariah Carey and her memoir The Meaning of Mariah Carey, Carey announced the release of her eighth compilation album. Carey stated on Good Morning America that,

"Basically, I found stuff in my vault that I had either started to work on a long time ago and never released or that I wanted to finish mixing or do whatever. But they're songs that have previously not been released."

== Music and content ==
The album consists of a two-disc track collection of unreleased songs, B-sides, demos and live performances. The album begins with "Here We Go Around Again" in which Idolator writer Mike Wass stated was "hard to understand how something this effortlessly charming and catchy didn’t make the tracklist of Mariah’s debut album." Carey channeled the Jackson 5 on this "buoyant bop from 1990, sounding so innocent that she can barely contain the sheer joy of relishing in her own melismatic powers." "Can You Hear Me" was described as "a stunning ballad, and was originally penned for Emotions (1991)". Carey has stated that the song was also written for Barbra Streisand. The previously released B-side songs include "Do You Think of Me" which was featured on the B-side of Carey's "Dreamlover", "Slipping Away" on the B-side of "Always Be My Baby" and "Everything Fades Away" on the B-side of "Hero" and also included as a bonus track on international editions of Carey's third studio album, Music Box (1993). The three B-sides were described as "legendary within The Lambily for good reason".

"All I Live For", a Music Box reject, was described as "90s R&B-lite". An extended version of the song was later released on the 30th anniversary edition of Music Box. Carey's work on "One Night" was also an "urban groove that probably scared the execs at Columbia at the time" and was "one of Mariah’s first collaborations with Jermaine Dupri, a creative relationship that would bear a lot of fruit in coming years." Carey's cover of Irene Cara’s "Out Here on My Own" was described as being "heaven-sent and, thematically, it makes complete sense for [Carey]." The song is a piano ballad. "Loverboy" was previously released on Carey's Glitter soundtrack in 2001 and The Rarities features an original mix of the song which samples the 1978 Yellow Magic Orchestra song "Firecracker", which is said to have sparked the feud between Carey and Jennifer Lopez. "I Pray" was described by The New York Post writer Chuck Arnold, as "one of the most straight-up spiritual things Carey has ever done, with a choir helping her to take it all the way to church." "Cool On You" continues the R&B sound and "stems from E=MC² era and finds [Carey] in full club mode [...] It's light and feathery fun that gets stuck in your head after the very first listen." "Mesmerized" is a "curiously sedate mid-tempo that was supposed to appear in The Paperboy."

The album also features a live rendition of the jazz ballad, "Lullaby of Birdland", in which Carey performed live at The Elusive Chanteuse Show in 2014 and was originally meant to feature on her album, Me. I Am Mariah... The Elusive Chanteuse (2014) which was then titled The Art of Letting Go. The lead single "Save the Day" with Ms. Lauryn Hill was "as timely as a song that was written in 2011 can be" and met with mixed reviews. One of the higher praised songs on the album was a 2020 re-recording of Carey's "Close My Eyes" from her album Butterfly (1997) which was described as a "real jewel in the crown" and that "few songs capture the power of the superstar’s voice and pen as well as this."

The second disc of the album features a live recording of Carey's Daydream World Tour concert at the Tokyo Dome, recorded in March 1996, and includes "Emotions", "Fantasy", "One Sweet Day", "Vision of Love", "Hero" and "All I Want for Christmas Is You".

== Promotion ==
"This year, [Carey has] been taking something of a victory lap with a celebration she’s calling "MC30", opening the vaults on never-before-seen video footage and an album of unreleased songs and demos called The Rarities, and she’s finally put all that legendary shade to paper with a memoir, The Meaning of Mariah Carey."

— Vulture author, Allison P. Davis.

On August 19, 2020, Carey announced the pre-order of The Rarities on her social media platforms, along with its release date of October 2, 2020. She performed "Vision of Love" and "Close My Eyes" during the Good Morning America concert series. On September 12, 2020, a music video was released for "Save the Day" to commemorate female tennis players. Upon release of the album, Carey released her full concert at the Tokyo Dome on her Vevo channel. On October 23, 2020, to further promote "Save the Day", Carey released a lyric video for the song which encouraged viewers to vote as well as paying tribute to "Breonna Taylor, Congressman John Lewis, trans activist and writer Raquel Willis, Sojourner Truth, Frederick Douglass, and essential workers on the frontlines of the pandemic, with portraits drawn by artist Molly Crabapple."

=== #MC30 ===
In the weeks leading up to the album, Carey released "digital EPs, remixes, bonus cuts, rare tracks, a cappella renditions and live performances" from her discography under the coined hashtag "#MC30". Her first release was on July 17, 2020, where she released a digital-only EP, The Live Debut – 1990, which featured a live performance from Carey's debut showcase at New York City's Club Tatou on October 22, 1990.

To further promote her 30th anniversary and the release of The Rarities, Carey released EP remixes of her songs: "There's Got to Be a Way", "Someday", "Emotions", "Make It Happen", "Dreamlover", "Never Forget You", "Anytime You Need a Friend", "Fantasy", "One Sweet Day", "Always Be My Baby", "Underneath the Stars", "Honey", "Butterfly", "The Roof", "Breakdown", "My All", "Sweetheart", "I Still Believe" and "Theme from Mahogany (Do You Know Where You're Going To)". She also released a Spanish EP titled Mariah en Español featuring Spanish versions of her songs "My All", "Open Arms" and "Hero". After the release of the album, Carey picked up at where she left off on her "#MC30" campaign and released EP remixes for "Heartbreaker", "Can't Take That Away (Mariah's Theme)", "Thank God I Found You" and "Against All Odds (Take a Look at Me Now)".

Among music releases, Carey has also released her live video performances on her Vevo channel from BBC One's Top of the Pops along with what Billboard described as "spruced-up" versions of her album discography in vinyl format. On November 13, 2020, Carey released an unreleased music video for "Underneath the Stars" filmed in 1996 and teased months earlier for "#MC30" on Carey's Instagram. In 2021, she resumed "#MC30" releases with EP's for the songs "Through the Rain", "Boy (I Need You)", "I Only Wanted", "The One", "Bringin' On the Heartbreak", "It's Like That", "We Belong Together", "Shake It Off", "Don't Forget About Us", "Say Somethin'", "Your Girl", "Touch My Body", "I Stay in Love", "I'll Be Lovin' U Long Time", "I'm That Chick" and "Joy to the World".

=== Singles ===
The album's lead single, "Save the Day", was released on August 21, 2020. The song charted at number 12 on Billboard's US Hot R&B Songs. "Out Here on My Own" was released as the second single on September 18, 2020. The album's promotional single, a limited edition cassette for "Here We Go Around Again" with "Loverboy (Firecracker – Original Version)" as a B-side was released in Japan on December 11, 2020. The double-sided single charted at number 59 in Japan for a week on December 21, 2020.

== Critical reception ==
Professional ratings
Aggregate scores
| Source | Rating |
|---|---|
| Metacritic | 74/100 |
Review scores
| Source | Rating |
| The Line of Best Fit | 8.5/10 |
| AllMusic | 3.5/5 stars |
| NME | 3/5 stars |
| Slant Magazine | 3/5 stars |

Upon release, the compilation album received generally positive reviews. On the review aggregator website Metacritic the album has a score of a 74 out of 100 based on reviews from 6 critics. Variety writer Jeremy Helligar gave the album high praise stating that, "unlike many of the pop queens that followed her up the charts, Carey can craft a hit without a cast of millions [...] and even as she switches up her emphasis from crossover pop to hip hop to adult soul, there’s a common thread of Mariah-ness running through everything." He gave praise to Carey's 2020 rendition of her classic, "Close My Eyes" from her sixth studio album Butterfly stating that, "Her vocals [...] are lovely and understated, even when she’s hitting her legendary whistle notes. He went on to say negatively that, "there are a few clunkers like her messy live take on the jazz classic "Lullaby of Birdland" [...] there should be a method to the madness. Unfortunately, Mariah's take on jazz chanteuse is more madness than method; suffice it to say she's no Sarah Vaughan." He also criticized "Save the Day" stating that "Ms. Lauryn Hill’s vocals have been cleverly interpolated" but called it a "rare lyrical misstep" saying that "what the world needs now is something more probing and specific than another string of peace homilies."

Los Angeles Times pop-music critic Mikael Wood also praised the album stating that the only negative aspect was that it did not "include anything from the out-of-print [...] alt-rock album that Carey secretly made in 1995 under the band name Chick." He praised the song "Here We Go Around Again" stating that her vocals were "precise as always" and praised her writing style saying that it was "already in a tune whose darting melody evokes the comings and goings of a guy who can’t make up his mind about her." Idolator writer Mike Wass also praised the album saying that "a collection of unreleased songs and B-Sides has no right being this good". He stated that "The Rarities is obviously essential listening for fans, but well worth diving into for general music lovers. After all, this is an important piece of pop history." NME writer Nick Levine, gave the album three out of five stars stating that the album "goes heavier on Carey's ballads than her edgier, hip-hop-influenced material of the late '90s onwards, but there's a delicious sense of revenge being served cold in the inclusion of "Loverboy" with its original sample." Rated R&B writer, Keithan Samuels, gave the album honourable mention on the publication's 30 Best R&B Albums of 2020 list. He stated, "Since her introduction, Carey has released songs that have shifted culture and have been the soundtrack to many of our lives [...] With The Rarities, Carey flips the script and allows the world to access the secret soundtrack that she has been curating unobtrusively." In describing the album, The Cavalier Daily writer Darryle Aldridge stated that it "lets fans and critics into a glimpse of [Carey's] true self, particularly the R&B siren that masqueraded as a tight-laced girl-next-door during her reign in the ‘90s." He went on to say that the album "is prime Mariah without the glitz, glamour or melodramatic flairs that shot her to fame."

== Commercial performance ==
In the United States, The Rarities debuted and peaked at number 31 on the Billboard 200 chart with 21,000 album equivalent units, 14,800 units are pure album sales. The album also debuted on Billboard's Top R&B/Hip-Hop Albums at number 15. On the UK Albums chart, the album debuted at number 44. The album also debuted and peaked inside the top-twenty in Australia and Spain, the top-thirty in Japan, Scotland and Switzerland, and the top-forty in Belgium, Croatia and Poland.

== Track listing ==
Credits from the album's liner notes.

Disc 1: The Rarities
| No. | Title | Writer(s) | Producer(s) | Length |
|---|---|---|---|---|
| 1. | "Here We Go Around Again" (1990; from the Mariah Carey sessions) | Mariah Carey; Ben Margulies | Carey; Margulies | 3:55 |
| 2. | "Can You Hear Me" (1991; from the Emotions sessions) | Carey; Barry Mann | Carey | 4:06 |
| 3. | "Do You Think of Me" (1993; B-side to "Dreamlover" CD single) | Carey; Walter Afanasieff; Mark C. Rooney; Mark Morales | Carey; Afanasieff; Rooney; Morales | 4:48 |
| 4. | "Everything Fades Away" (1993; B-side to "Hero" CD single) | Carey; Afanasieff | Carey; Afanasieff | 5:25 |
| 5. | "All I Live For" (1993; from the Music Box sessions) | Carey; Afanasieff | Carey; Afanasieff | 3:22 |
| 6. | "One Night" (1995; from the Daydream sessions) | Carey; Jermaine Dupri | Carey; Dupri | 4:41 |
| 7. | "Slipping Away" (1996; B-side to "Always Be My Baby" CD single) | Carey; Dave "Jam" Hall | Carey; Hall | 4:31 |
| 8. | "Out Here on My Own" (2000; from the Glitter sessions) | Lesley Gore; Michael Gore | Carey | 3:16 |
| 9. | "Loverboy" (Firecracker – Original Version) (2001; from the Glitter sessions) | Carey; Martin Denny | Carey; Clark Kent^{[a]} | 3:14 |
| 10. | "I Pray" (2005) | Carey; Kenneth Crouch | Carey; Crouch^{[a]} | 2:53 |
| 11. | "Cool on You" (2007; from the E=MC² sessions) | Carey; Dupri; Manuel Seal Jr.; Johntá Austin | Carey; Dupri^{[a]}; Seal^{[a]} | 3:11 |
| 12. | "Mesmerized" (2012; originally recorded for The Paperboy soundtrack) | Carey; Loris Holland | Carey; Holland^{[a]}; Randy Jackson^{[a]} | 3:22 |
| 13. | "Lullaby of Birdland" (Live) (2014; from the Me. I Am Mariah... The Elusive Chanteuse sessions) | George Shearing; George David Weiss | Carey; James "Big Jim" Wright^{[b]} | 3:18 |
| 14. | "Save the Day" (with Ms. Lauryn Hill) (2020) | Carey; Dupri; Wright; Charles Fox; Norman Gimbel | Carey; Dupri^{[a]} | 3:48 |
| 15. | "Close My Eyes" (Acoustic) (2020) | Carey; Afanasieff | Carey | 3:18 |
| Total length: | | | | 57:08 |

Disc 2 / Japanese video edition bonus Blu-ray Disc 3: Live at the Tokyo Dome
| No. | Title | Writer(s) | Length |
|---|---|---|---|
| 1. | "Daydream Interlude" (Fantasy Sweet Dub Mix) | Carey; Hall; Christopher Frantz; Tina Weymouth; Adrian Belew; Steven Stanley | 1:31 |
| 2. | "Emotions" | Carey; David Cole; Robert Clivillés | 4:06 |
| 3. | "Open Arms" | Stephen Perry; Jonathan Cain | 3:46 |
| 4. | "Forever" | Carey; Afanasieff | 4:46 |
| 5. | "I Don't Wanna Cry" | Carey; Narada Michael Walden | 5:54 |
| 6. | "Fantasy" | Carey; Hall; Frantz; Weymouth; Belew; Stanley | 5:25 |
| 7. | "Always Be My Baby" | Carey; Dupri; Seal | 4:38 |
| 8. | "One Sweet Day" | Carey; Afanasieff; Michael McCary; Nathan Morris; Wanya Morris; Shawn Stockman | 5:20 |
| 9. | "Underneath the Stars" | Carey; Afanasieff | 4:07 |
| 10. | "Without You" | William Peter Ham; Tom Evans | 4:19 |
| 11. | "Make It Happen" | Carey; Cole; Clivillés | 5:03 |
| 12. | "Just Be Good to Me" | James Harris III; Terry Lewis | 6:37 |
| 13. | "Dreamlover" | Carey; Hall | 3:58 |
| 14. | "Vision of Love" | Carey; Margulies | 3:46 |
| 15. | "Hero" | Carey; Afanasieff | 4:59 |
| 16. | "Anytime You Need a Friend" | Carey; Afanasieff | 5:58 |
| 17. | "All I Want for Christmas Is You" | Carey; Afanasieff | 5:04 |
| Total length: | | | 79:17 |

Notes

- ^{^[a]}signifies a co-producer
- ^{^[b]}signifies a musical director

Sample credits

- "Loverboy" contains a sample of "Firecracker" by the Yellow Magic Orchestra (1978).
- "Save the Day" contains elements of "Killing Me Softly" by the Fugees (1996).
- "Fantasy" contains a sample and interpolation of "Genius of Love" by Tom Tom Club (1981).
- "Dreamlover" contains a sample of "Blind Alley" by The Emotions (1972).

== Charts ==
=== Weekly charts ===
Chart performance of The Rarities
| Chart (2020) | Peak position |
|---|---|
| Australian Albums (ARIA) | 16 |
| Australian Urban Albums (ARIA) | 6 |
| Belgian Albums (Ultratop Flanders) | 53 |
| Belgian Albums (Ultratop Wallonia) | 32 |
| Canadian Albums (Billboard) | 80 |
| Croatian International Albums (HDU) | 31 |
| Dutch Albums (Album Top 100) | 47 |
| French Albums (SNEP) | 70 |
| German Albums (Offizielle Top 100) | 65 |
| Italian Albums (FIMI) | 50 |
| Japanese Albums (Oricon) | 24 |
| Japan Hot Albums (Billboard Japan) | 29 |
| Polish Albums (ZPAV) | 39 |
| Scottish Albums (Official Charts) | 30 |
| South Korean Albums (Circle) | 98 |
| Spanish Albums (Promusicae) | 12 |
| Swiss Albums (Schweizer Hitparade) | 29 |
| Taiwanese Albums (Five Music) | 1 |
| UK Albums (Official Charts) | 44 |
| US Billboard 200 | 31 |
| US Top R&B/Hip-Hop Albums (Billboard) | 15 |

| Chart (2023) | Peak position |
|---|---|
| Spanish Vinyl Albums (PROMUSICAE) | 17 |

=== Year-end charts ===
| Chart (2020) | Position |
|---|---|
| US Top Current Albums (Billboard) | 193 |
