= Loverboy (Mariah Carey song) =

2001 single by Mariah Carey

Single by Mariah Carey featuring Cameo

from the album Glitter
- B-side: "Never Too Far"
- Released: June 19, 2001
- Recorded: 2000
- Studio: Right Track (New York City); Quad (New York City); Sheffield Audio Truck; Marvin's Room (Los Angeles); Larrabee West (California); The Record Plant (California)
- Genre: R&B; pop-funk
- Length: 3:50
- Label: Virgin
- Songwriters: Mariah Carey; Larry Blackmon; Thomas Jenkins
- Producers: Clark Kent; Mariah Carey

Mariah Carey singles chronology
"Against All Odds" (2000)	"Loverboy" (2001)	"Never Too Far" (2001)

Cameo singles chronology
"You Are My Love" (1995)	"Loverboy" (2001)	"El Passo" (2019)

Music videos
- "Loverboy" on YouTube; "Loverboy" (remix) on YouTube

"Loverboy" is a song by American singer-songwriter Mariah Carey. It was released on June 19, 2001, by Virgin Records America as the lead single from her eighth studio album Glitter, the soundtrack to the 2001 film of the same name. Written and produced by Carey, Larry Blackmon, Thomas Jenkins and Clark Kent, "Loverboy" is built around a sample from "Candy" by the funk band Cameo, who are also featured on the track. Lyrically, the song finds Carey fantasizing about her loverboy, a man that will fulfill her physical and sexual desires. The recording was accompanied by an official remix, titled "Loverboy Remix", featuring guest artists Ludacris, Da Brat, Shawnna and Twenty II.

The track was subject to controversy, following confirmed reports that Carey's ex-husband Tommy Mottola stole the idea of sampling the singer's original planned sample, Yellow Magic Orchestra's "Firecracker", in favor of Jennifer Lopez over a month after Carey had signed for it. Since Carey's Glitter was to be released over a month after Lopez's album J.Lo, she changed the song's melody to sample from "Candy" instead. Further controversy ensued following its release, as Carey was hospitalized for severe mental and physical exhaustion, following poorly received television appearances involving both the song and album.

After the song's release in the United States, "Loverboy" stalled on the Billboard Hot 100 due to weak radio airplay. The single jumped 58 spots to number two on the Billboard Hot 100 for the week ending August 4, 2001, with sales driven by a Virgin promotion offering the CD for a bargain-priced 49 cents. "Loverboy" only spent 14 weeks on the chart. It also became Carey's first lead single to not reach number one. Though it peaked at number one in Croatia and reached the top 10 in Australia and Canada, the song failed to garner strong charting elsewhere, reaching the top 20 in Portugal, Italy and the United Kingdom.

"Loverboy" received generally mixed reviews from music critics; many called the song unoriginal and dated while others felt that the featured artists (primarily on the remix version) overpowered Carey and made the song disorganized. A music video, directed by David LaChapelle, was shot for both versions of the song. The first version features Carey as a scantily-clad car girl, waving a flag as her loverboy finishes a race. The video for the remix version features similar footage, only including shots of the song's guests in race-cars during their verses. She performed "Loverboy" live on The Sweet Sweet Fantasy Tour in 2016, as well as her Caution World Tour in 2019.

In 2020, the original "Firecracker"-sampled version of "Loverboy" was included on Carey's eighth compilation album The Rarities and was released as a limited edition double A-side Japanese single in December 2020.

== Background and release ==
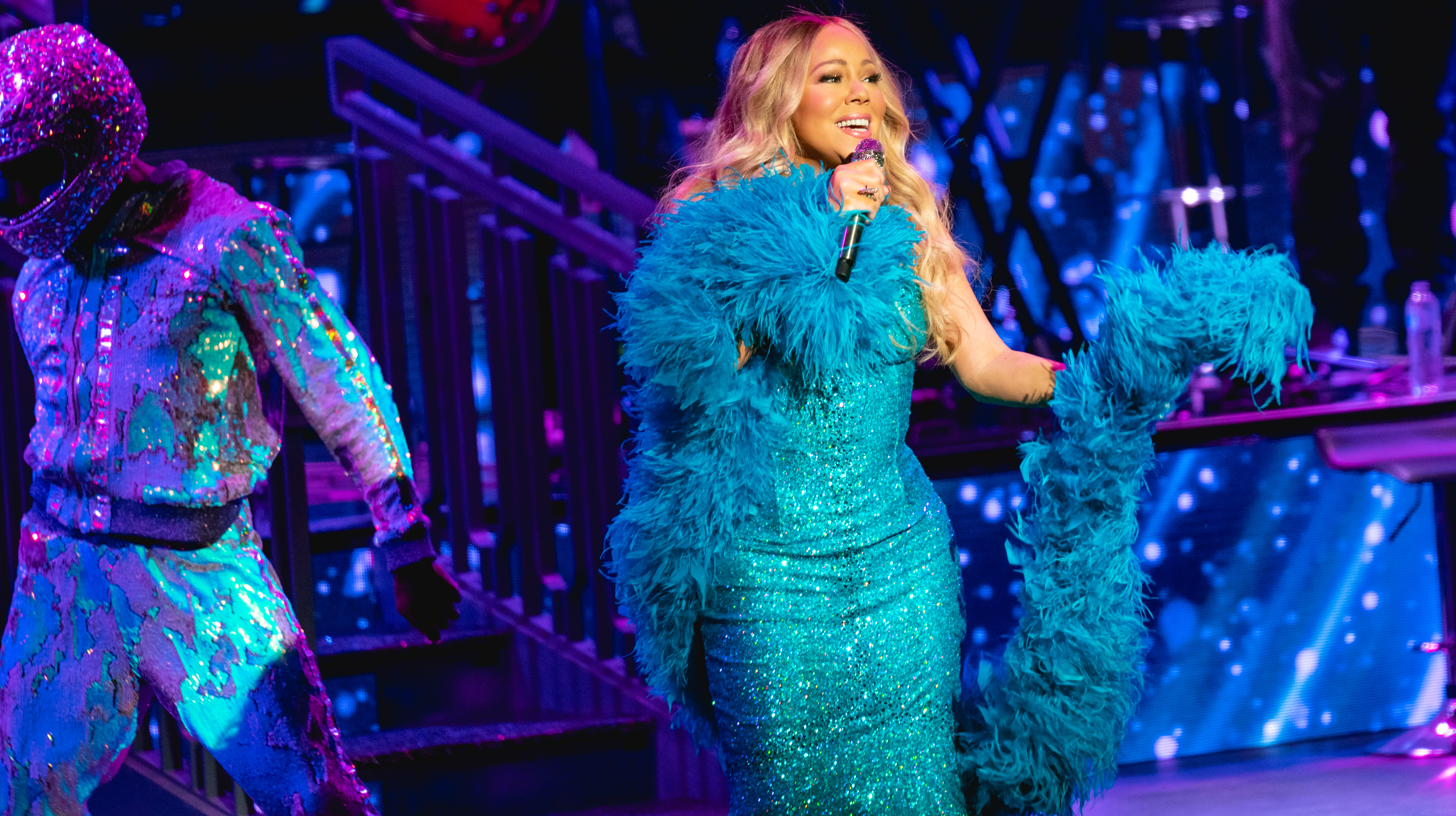
Carey performing "Loverboy" as part of the #JusticeForGlitter medley of her Caution World Tour (2019)

Originally planned to be released at a later date, "Loverboy" was leaked to radio on June 1, 2001. As a result, Virgin Records pushed the release date in order to control the leak. Following the release of "Loverboy", Carey embarked on a short promotional campaign for the song. On July 18, 2001, Virgin scheduled Carey to do a day of interviews with radio stations. After she called in an hour late to Q100 in Atlanta at 9:00 a.m. and the hosts informed Carey that she was late, the rest of the day's interviews were canceled. The next day, Carey made a surprise appearance on the MTV program Total Request Live (TRL). As the show's host Carson Daly began taping following a commercial break, Carey came out onto the filming stage, pushing an ice cream cart while wearing a large men's shirt. Seemingly anxious and exhilarated, Carey began giving out individual bars of ice cream to fans and guests on the program, while waving to the crowd down below on Times Square, while diverging into a rambling monologue regarding therapy. Carey then walked to Daly's platform and began a striptease, in which she shed her shirt to reveal a tight yellow and green ensemble, leading him to exclaim "Mariah Carey has lost her mind!". While she later revealed that Daly was aware of her presence in the building prior to her appearance, she admitted that he was meant to act surprised in order to provide a more dramatic effect for the program.

Carey's appearance on TRL garnered strong media attention, with many critics and newspapers citing her behavior as "troubled" and "erratic". In the days following her appearance on TRL, Carey had begun displaying "erratic behavior" during a public record signing for the single at Tower Records in New York. As the appearance was filmed, she began rambling on several points, leading her to discuss radio-host Howard Stern and how his form of humor on his program bothered her greatly. At that point, Carey's publicist Cindi Berger grabbed the microphone from her hand and ordered the cameras to stop filming. A few days later, Carey began posting irregular voice notes and messages on her official website:

I'm trying to understand things in life right now and so I really don't feel that I should be doing music right now. What I'd like to do is just a take a little break or at least get one night of sleep without someone popping up about a video. All I really want is [to] just be me and that's what I should have done in the first place ... I don't say this much but guess what, I don't take care of myself.

After the removal of the messages, Berger commented that Carey had been "obviously exhausted and not thinking clearly" when she posted the letters. Two days later on July 26, she was suddenly hospitalized, citing "extreme exhaustion" and a "physical and emotional breakdown". Following the heavy media coverage surrounding Carey's publicized breakdown and hospitalization, Virgin Records and 20th Century Fox delayed the release of both the film's soundtrack and the film itself for three weeks: from August 21 to September 11 and from August 31 to September 21, respectively.

Following Carey's absence from the public eye, as well as her abandonment of promotional appearances for the film and soundtrack, her unprecedented $100 million five-album record deal with Virgin Records (EMI Records) was bought out for $50 million. The decision was brought out due to the low sales of the project, as well as the negative publicity surrounding her breakdown. Soon after, Carey flew to Capri, Italy for a period of five months, in which she began writing material for her new album, stemming from all the personal experiences she had endured throughout the past year. Additionally, she founded her own label modelled after her initials, MonarC Entertainment and signed a new three-album record deal with Island Records, valued at over $23 million.

In 2020, the original and previously unreleased version of "Loverboy" that sampled "Firecracker" was included on Carey's compilation album The Rarities as part of the "#MC30" initiative. The latter was a campaign marking the 30th anniversary of Carey's self-titled debut studio album, Mariah Carey (1990), and coincides with her memoir The Meaning of Mariah Carey (2020). "Loverboy" (Firecracker – Original Version) was released as a limited edition double A-side single with "Here We Go Around Again", another song taken from The Rarities.

== Composition ==
"Loverboy"
A sample of "Loverboy", showing Carey's incorporation of the "Candy" sample, as well as its racy and sexually suggestive lyrics.

"Loverboy" 's hook is built around a sample of "Candy", by Cameo. Aside from borrowing from the melody, "Loverboy" features the members of Cameo, including group leader Larry Blackmon, as vocalists on the track. According to Chuck Taylor from Billboard, "Loverboy" is reminiscent of several of Carey's previous lead singles, as they too were predominantly built around samples of older songs. He described some of its background flourishes as "swirling harmonies overtop" and noted the inclusion of many shouts and ad-libs from Carey and Cameo. The song's repeated "woo!" background vocal sample is original audio recorded by actress and model Pamela Anderson.

Due to the song's heavy usage of the "Candy" sample and the heavy blend of instrumentation and vocals, Taylor said that to his bewilderment, the song was "devoid of a standard hook". NME's Elios Therepio felt the idea of sampling "Candy" was genius "on paper", but once it was recorded, it suffered from various miscalculations. He felt it did not match the success Carey's previous single, "Fantasy" (which also recalled its melody from an older song), and criticized the inclusion of several over-the-top "keyboard and synth arrangements". Regarding Carey's voice, aside from describing it as "obscured", Therepio expressed his difficulty in understanding her lyrical phrases, claiming it was weakened from "no-everyone-can-understand-what-you're-saying'-itis". Gil Kaufman from MTV News noted the inclusion of "bouncing funky bass [and] rock guitars", while Roger Caitlin of the Hartford Courant described how Carey was often reduced to "breathy background vocals" on "Loverboy".

Lyrically, the song finds Carey looking for her "loverboy" and a sugar-daddy who is going to "love her right". Therepio found it ironic how Carey was crooning for a sugar-daddy, when she had just left one (referring to her older ex-husband Tommy Mottola). Additionally, he felt Carey was molding her image from that of a balladeer, to a "pin-up image" of a pop star. The song's lyrics are racy and feature the protagonist asking for her "loverboy" to fulfill her sexual desires: "Loverboy come on and love me / Give me more".

=== Sampling controversy ===
"Firecracker"
A sample of "Firecracker" from the 1978 album Yellow Magic Orchestra by the band of the same name. This song was sampled in the original version of "Loverboy".

"Loverboy" (original version)
The original version of "Loverboy", which samples "Firecracker" and was included in The Rarities (2020).

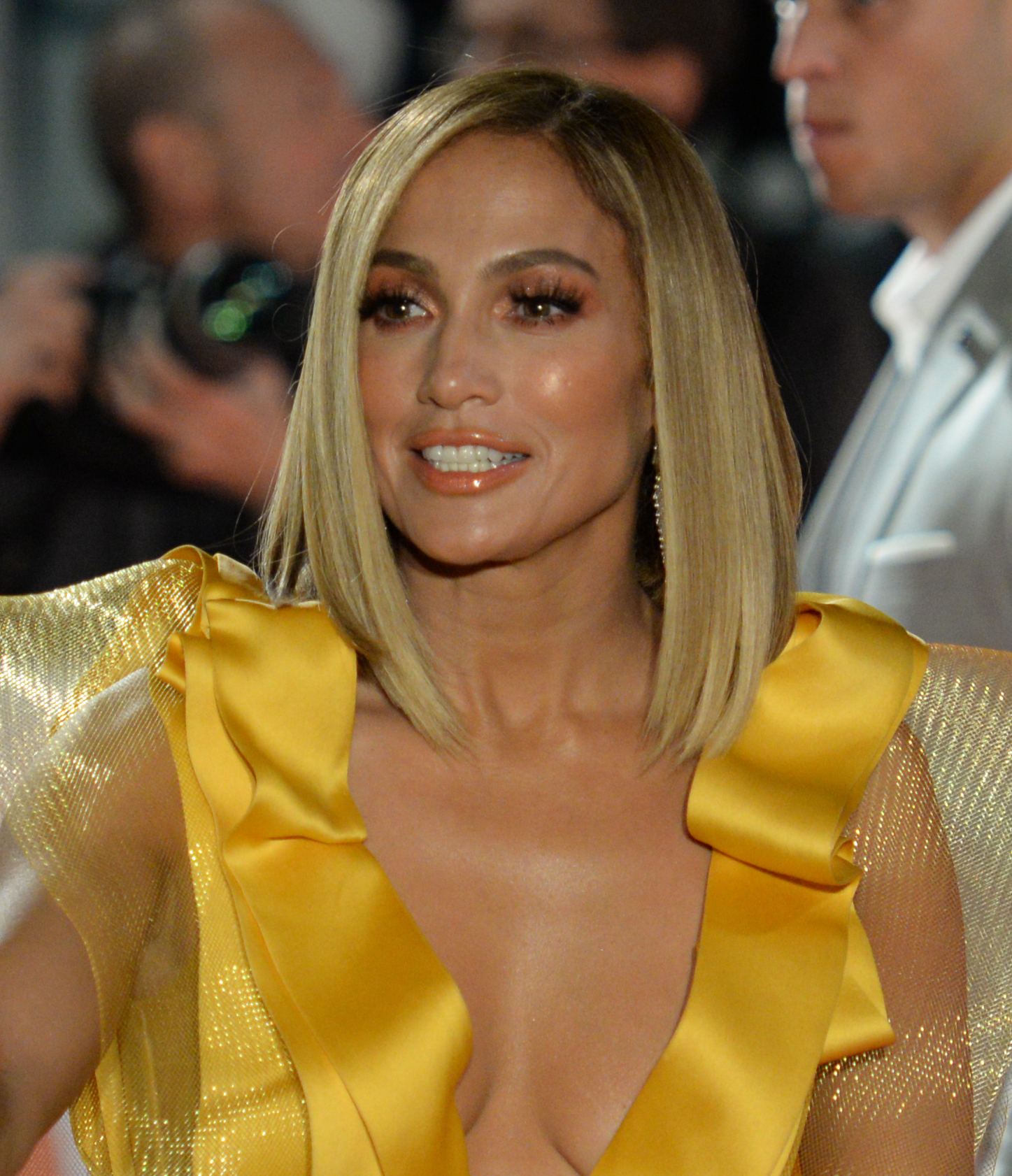
Jennifer Lopez was accused of stealing the idea of sampling "Firecracker".

Throughout 2000, Carey had already been writing and recording material for Glitter. During this period, she developed the concept for the album's lead single, "Loverboy". Originally, Carey had sampled the melody and hook from the 1978 Yellow Magic Orchestra song "Firecracker", using an interpolation of it throughout the chorus and introduction. In early theatrical trailers for Glitter, the original version of "Loverboy" was still featured. As Carey had ended her contract with Columbia Records, Jennifer Lopez was signed by Tommy Mottola and had begun recording material for her album, J.Lo (2001). According to The Inc.'s Irv Gotti, Mottola, head of Columbia and Carey's ex-husband, knew of Carey's usage of the "Firecracker" sample and attempted to have Lopez use the same sample before her. At the time, Carey had become increasingly paranoid over outside executives being informed about Glitter, especially following news of Mottola's "theft" of the song.

When the music publishers for "Firecracker" were questioned, they confirmed that Carey had licensed usage of the sample first, and Lopez's team had signed for it over one month later, under Mottola's arrangement. Following the scandal, Carey was not able to use the original sample, as Lopez's album was to be released far earlier than Glitter. She subsequently changed the composition of "Loverboy" and incorporated a new sample, "Candy" by Cameo. The "Firecracker" sample ended up being used by Lopez on her song "I'm Real", from her album J.Lo, while the original version of Carey's "Loverboy" with the "Firecracker" sample was later included on her compilation album The Rarities (2020).

== Critical reception ==
Professional ratings
Review scores
Source	Rating
AllMusic	2.5/5 stars
Belfast News-Letter	0/5 stars
Dotmusic	0.5/5
Entertainment Weekly	C−
The Irish Times	1/5 stars
NME	6/10
North Wales Weekly News	2/10
Pontefract & Castleford Express	3/5 stars
Richmond Times-Dispatch	D
Stereogum	4/10

"Loverboy" was met with generally mixed reviews from music critics; many were not impressed with the incorporation of the sample and felt the song did not lead Carey into any newer ground or innovation. Additionally, several reviewers were not impressed with Carey's concealed vocals and the song's complex production. Sarah Rodman of the Boston Herald described the song's production as a "traffic-jam" and wrote "'Loverboy' is another in an increasingly long line of glitzy, candy-coated, creatively stunted song." Writing for the Los Angeles Times, Natalie Nichols felt "Loverboy" was "predictable" and presented nothing new for Carey's audience. USA Today's Edna Gunderson wrote the song off as "skimpy", while Glenn Gamboa from Newsday described its overall reception as "lukewarm".

Harry Guerin from Raidió Teilifís Éireann outed the song as one of Carey's "finest moments" on Glitter and disagreed with criticism regarding the "overly-populated" musical background". Allmusic editor Stephen Thomas Erlewine listed the song as the only "recommended" song from Glitter, while Gil Kaufman of MTV News called it a "fun, uptempo dance number". Craig Seymour from Entertainment Weekly rated "Loverboy" a C−, criticizing its lyrical content and production. An anonymous writer from The Guardian felt the song had "no decipherable tune", due to the inclusion of electronic musical instruments and background shouts and ad-libs. Billboard's Chuck Taylor described the song as "self-sabotage" and felt Carey was gambling her longevity. He described the production as a "mumbo jumbo of disparate elements" and wrote "the mighty may have fallen here".

== Chart performance ==
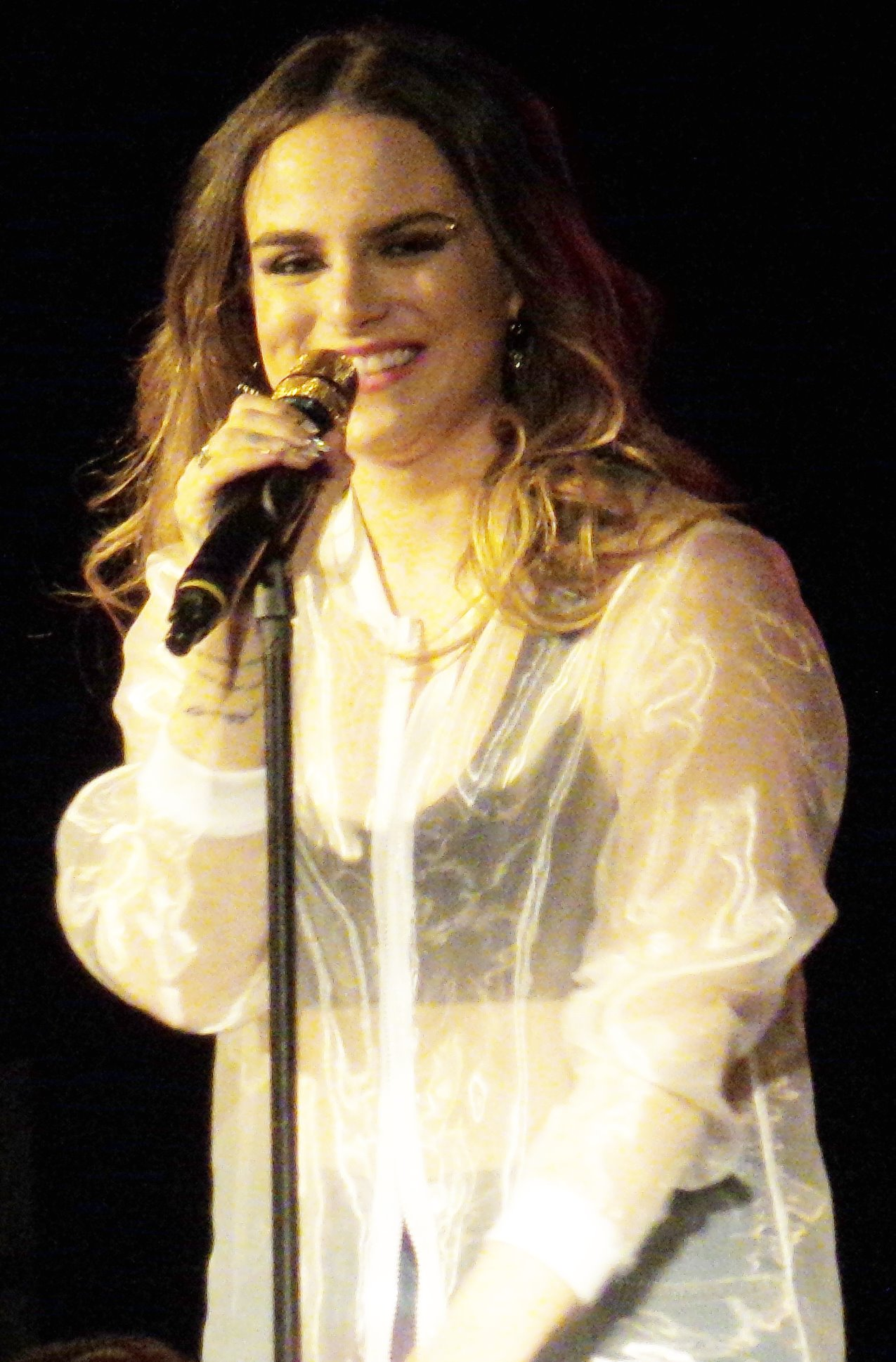
"Loverboy" set a record for the biggest jump on the Billboard Hot 100; this was later broken by JoJo (pictured) in 2006.

In the United States, "Loverboy" became Carey's second-lowest debut of her career on the Billboard Hot 100 chart at number 79. On the week of August 4, 2001, the song jumped from number 60 to number two on the chart, as a result of Carey's publicized hospitalization, as well as Virgin's price reduction on the single, becoming the largest jump into the top-three spot in Billboard history; this record was later broken by American singer JoJo for her song "Too Little Too Late" (2006). It was blocked from the top spot by Destiny's Child's "Bootylicious", whose price was also reduced to 49 cents as a result of Columbia Records'—the girl group's record label and Carey's ex-label owned by her former husband, Tommy Mottola—want to block Carey. Its poor radio airplay throughout the United States was given as the reason as to why it did not reach number one. It also peaked atop the Billboard's Hot Singles Sales chart for four consecutive weeks. "Loverboy" finished as the best-selling single of 2001 in the United States, with sales of 571,000 units, falling short of the previous year's best-seller, which accumulated sales upwards of one million copies. The Recording Industry Association of America (RIAA) certified the song Gold. In Canada, "Loverboy" peaked at number three on the singles chart and charted for a total of thirteen weeks.

Throughout Australasia and Europe, the song peaked outside the top 20 in most countries. "Loverboy" debuted at its peak position of number seven on the Australian Singles Chart, during the week of July 29, 2001. The following week, the song began its decline and experienced a total chart trajectory of seven weeks. The song was certified Gold by the Australian Recording Industry Association (ARIA), denoting shipments of over 35,000 units. On July 29, 2001, "Loverboy" debuted at number 65 on the Ö3 Austria Top 40 chart, spending a total of three weeks in the chart. The song achieved relatively weak charting in both the Flemish and Wallonian territories in Belgium, peaking at numbers 49 and 34, respectively. Making its debut at its peak position of number 54, "Loverboy" charted for a total of nine weeks in France, before falling out on November 3, 2001. On the Dutch Top 40 chart, the song made its debut at number 68. The following week the song peaked at number 34, before dropping outside the top 40 three weeks later, ending its five-week run. On July 26, 2001, "Loverboy" debuted at number 49 on the Swedish Singles Chart and reached a peak of number 44. Similarly in Switzerland, the song peaked at number 66 and spent only four weeks fluctuating inside the chart. On the UK Singles Chart, the song debuted at its peak of number 12. The following week, the song dropped to number 29 on the chart, before dropping outside the top 40 two weeks later.

== Remix ==
Aside from the regular version of the song, an official remix of "Loverboy" was included on Glitter. The song's main remix, titled "Loverboy Remix", uses the same sample as the album version and retains most of Carey's original vocals. It has a different introduction, the singing and spoken parts of Cameo are greatly reduced (and are not credited), and additional raps are included by Da Brat, Ludacris, Shawnna, and Twenty II. Jim Farber from Daily News criticized Brat's verse, writing how it "cut right through" the production. The Morning Call's Len Righi described the remix as "cloddish", while Jim Abbott from the Orlando Sentinel felt the song's guests "upstaged" Carey.

== Music video ==
In the still, Carey is shown portraying a cheer-leader by a racing event. Music reviewers criticized her image, consisting of a lighter hair color and double-handkerchief bra, which they felt cheapened the singer.

The music video was directed by David LaChapelle and filmed from May 15 to 18, 2001 in Van Nuys, California and in Palmdale, California at Los Angeles County Raceway. The video premiered on Total Request Live on June 8, 2001, and segments of the filming were screened through Making the Video during the week leading up to the release. The video introduced a less demure image of Carey, one that received negative backlash from critics. She appears in the video with a lighter hair color than she had sported in the past and wearing a series of revealing ensembles. Reviewers disregarded Carey's newer image, primarily her double-handkerchief bra, and likened her to younger pop singers such as Britney Spears, which they felt cheapened the singer.

The video begins with Cameo members Larry Blackmon and Tomi Jenkins driving down a dragstrip, while Carey, dressed in revealing clothing, is shown singing in various "car girl" positions at the track on a hot summer day. She flags down cars as the "flag girl" and dances as a "tire girl" in a kaleidoscope-inspired sequence. Several other scenes of Carey in a pink jumpsuit while riding on top of a modified Buick Regal are shown, during which Ludacris and Shawnna in a 1932 Ford Victoria are seen racing against Da Brat and Twenty II in a more modern car without a hood.

An alternate edit of the music video was made for the remix, which retains most of the shots of the original but emphasizes the rap verses from Ludacris, Shawnna, Da Brat and Twenty II, before showing Carey jumping out of a pop out cake as a trophy girl to the roars of the crowd below, declaring Da Brat and Twenty II the winners of the race.

Professional ratings
Review scores
Source	Rating
Herald Sun	2/5 stars
The Salt Lake Tribune	D−
The Wichita Eagle	2.5/4 stars

The music video for "Loverboy" received generally negative reviews from critics, many of whom felt Carey was portrayed in an overtly sexual manner. A writer from The Guardian criticized the video, calling it "wacky" and describing Carey's choreography as "running amok". Slant Magazine's Sal Cinquemani felt the video was "brilliantly over-the-top", while an anonymous columnist from NME commented that it would cause male viewers to "play with themselves" after watching. In a countdown of "The 5 Least Sexiest Music Videos", Priya Elan from NME included the video at number three, writing how the singer "spins with the mad-eyed grace of someone who hasn't been to sleep for 72 hours" (referring to Carey's mention of insomnia as a reason for her breakdown). Japiya Burns of The Michigan Daily was critical of Carey's portrayal in the video, primarily her double-handkerchief bra. He felt that in doing so, Carey was cheapening herself and her image to resemble younger pop singers such as Britney Spears.

On October 16, 2026, Carey re-released the remix version of the song's music video on her official YouTube channel and streaming platforms for the 25th anniversary edition of Glitter, after it had been officially unavailable since its initial release in 2001. The video was remastered in 4K resolution and re-colored. Two weeks later, on October 30, 2026, the original version featuring Cameo was also re-released in 4K.

== Live performances ==
At the time of its release, Carey did not perform "Loverboy" live. The first performance of the song came 5 months later at a private special concert for the US troops at Camp Bondsteele in Kosovo. Carey also performed her single at the time "Never Too Far / Hero Medley", "My All", a snippet of "Santa Claus Is Comin' to Town" and "All I Want for Christmas Is You". 15 years later, it was performed again on Carey's Sweet Sweet Fantasy Tour in 2016, this time as part of the Car Ride medley. Three years later, it was also performed as part of the #JusticeForGlitter medley of Carey's Caution World Tour.

== Formats and track listings ==
US, Canadian, Benelux, French and Japanese 2-track CD single

1. "Loverboy" (featuring Cameo) - 3:50
2. "Loverboy" (Remix featuring Da Brat, Ludacris, Twenty II and Shawnna) - 4:32

UK and European CD maxi-single

1. "Loverboy" (featuring Cameo) - 3:50
2. "Loverboy" (MJ Cole Remix) - 5:54
3. "Loverboy" (Club of Love Remix) - 9:05
4. "Loverboy" (Video) - 3:48

Australian, South African, Taiwanese, Thai and European 6-track CD maxi-single

1. "Loverboy" (featuring Cameo) - 3:50
2. "Loverboy" (Remix featuring Da Brat, Ludacris, Twenty II and Shawnna) - 4:32
3. "Loverboy" (Club of Love Remix) - 9:05
4. "Loverboy" (MJ Cole Remix) - 5:54
5. "Loverboy" (Dub of Love Remix) - 8:13
6. "Loverboy" (Video) - 3:48

US CD maxi-single

1. "Loverboy" (featuring Cameo) - 3:50
2. "Loverboy" (Remix featuring Da Brat, Ludacris, Twenty II and Shawnna) - 4:32
3. "Loverboy" (MJ Cole Remix) - 5:54
4. "Loverboy" (MJ Cole Instrumental) - 5:54
5. "Loverboy" (MJ Cole London Dub Mix) - 6:04
6. "Loverboy" (Club of Love Remix) - 9:05
7. "Loverboy" (Dub of Love Remix) - 8:13
8. "Loverboy" (Drums of Love) - 6:36

US cassette single

1. "Loverboy" (featuring Cameo) - 3:50
2. "Loverboy" (Remix featuring Da Brat, Ludacris, Twenty II and Shawnna) - 4:32

UK cassette single

1. "Loverboy" (featuring Cameo) - 3:50
2. "Loverboy" (MJ Cole Remix) - 5:54
3. "Loverboy" (Club of Love Remix) - 9:05

UK 12-inch vinyl single

1. "Loverboy" (Remix featuring Da Brat, Ludacris, Twenty II and Shawnna) - 4:32
2. "Loverboy" (MJ Cole Remix) - 5:54
3. "Loverboy" (Club of Love Remix) - 9:05

UK and Italian 12-inch vinyl single (remixes)

1. "Loverboy" (Drums of Love) - 6:36
2. "Loverboy" (Dub of Love Remix) - 8:13
3. "Loverboy" (MJ Cole London Dub Mix) - 6:04

US 12-inch vinyl single

1. "Loverboy" (Remix featuring Da Brat, Ludacris, Twenty II and Shawnna) - 4:32
2. "Loverboy" (Remix Instrumental) - 4:49
3. "Loverboy" (featuring Cameo) - 3:50
4. "Loverboy" (Instrumental) - 3:44

US double 12-inch vinyl single (remixes)

1. "Loverboy" (MJ Cole Remix) - 5:54
2. "Loverboy" (MJ Cole Instrumental) - 5:54
3. "Loverboy" (MJ Cole London Dub Mix) - 6:04
4. "Loverboy" (MJ Cole Radio Edit) - 4:19
5. "Loverboy" (Club of Love Remix) - 9:05
6. "Loverboy" (Dub of Love Remix) - 8:13
7. "Loverboy" (Drums of Love) - 6:36

Japanese limited edition 2020 cassette single

1. "Here We Go Around Again" - 3:52
2. "Loverboy" (Firecracker – Original Version) - 3:13

== Credits and personnel ==
Credits are adapted from the liner notes of Glitter.

=== Recording ===
- Recorded at Right Track Studios (New York City), Quad Studio (New York City), Sheffield Audio Truck, Marvin's Room (Los Angeles), Larrabee Studios West (California), The Record Plant (California)
- Mastered at Gateway Mastering and DVD (Portland, Maine)

=== Personnel ===
- Vocals – Mariah Carey, Cameo
- Songwriting – Mariah Carey, Larry Blackmon, Thomas Jenkins
- Producer – Clark Kent, Mariah Carey
- Background vocals – Mariah Carey, Mary Ann Tatum
- Percussion – Carl "Butch" Smallz
- Engineering – Dana Jon Chappelle
- Assistant engineering – Andrew Fellus, Ann Mincieli, Patrick Webber, John Nettlesbey, Kelly Hibbert, Brian Paluralski, Peter Novak, Jason Schweitzer, Ryan Smith, Anthony Kilhoffer, Elliot Blakely
- Mixing – Dana Jon Chappelle
- Additional mixing – Michael "Mikizza" Schlesinger
- Pro Tools – Florian Ammon, Dana Jon Chapelle, Andrew Fellus
- Mastering – Bob Ludwig

== Charts ==
Weekly chart performance for "Loverboy"
Chart (2001)	Peak position
Australia (ARIA)	7
Australian Urban (ARIA)	4
Austria (Ö3 Austria Top 40)	65
Belgium (Ultratop 50 Flanders)	49
Belgium (Ultratop 50 Wallonia)	34
Canada (Nielsen SoundScan)	3
Croatia International Airplay (HRT)	1
Eurochart Hot 100 (Music & Media)	28
France (SNEP)	54
Germany (GfK)	57
Ireland (IRMA)	50
Italy (FIMI)	13
Japan (Oricon)	52
Netherlands (Dutch Top 40)	35
Netherlands (Single Top 100)	34
Poland (Nielsen Music Control)	6
Scottish Singles Sales (Official Charts)	23
South Africa (RISA)	50
Spain Airplay (Music & Media)	7
Sweden (Sverigetopplistan)	44
Switzerland (Schweizer Hitparade)	66
UK Singles (Official Charts)	12
UK Dance (Official Charts)	4
UK Hip Hop/R&B (Official Charts)	5
UK Club (Music Week)	9
UK Urban Club (Music Week)	3
UK Airplay (Music Control)	49
US Billboard Hot 100	2
US Dance Club Songs (Billboard)	45
US Dance Singles Sales (Billboard)	3
US Hot R&B/Hip-Hop Songs (Billboard) featuring Da Brat and Ludacris	1
US Pop Airplay (Billboard)	37
US Rhythmic Airplay (Billboard)	21
US Top 40 Tracks (Billboard)	40
US CHR/Pop (Radio & Records)	35
US CHR/Rhythmic (Radio & Records)	19
US Mix Show (Radio & Records)	23
US Urban (Radio & Records)	19

Year-end chart performance for "Loverboy"
Chart (2001)	Position
Canada (Nielsen SoundScan)	43
US Billboard Hot 100	80
US Hot R&B/Hip-Hop Singles & Tracks (Billboard) featuring Da Brat and Ludacris	58

Decade-end chart performance for "Loverboy"
Chart (2000–2009)	Position
US Hot Singles Sales (Billboard)	21

== Certifications and sales ==
Certifications and sales for "Loverboy"
Region	Certification	Certified units/sales
Australia (ARIA)	Gold	35,000^{^}
South Africa (RISA)	Gold	25,000
United States (RIAA)	Gold	571,000
^{^} Shipments figures based on certification alone.

== Release history ==
Release dates and formats for "Loverboy"
Region	Date	Format(s)	Label(s)	Ref.
United States	June 19, 2001	Contemporary hit radio; rhythmic contemporary radio	Virgin	
Italy	July 1, 2001	Digital download	EMI	
Europe	July 9, 2001	CD; maxi CD	EMI	
Australia	July 16, 2001	CD	EMI	
United Kingdom	July 16, 2001	12-inch vinyl; CD; cassette	Virgin	
United States	July 17, 2001	12-inch vinyl; CD; maxi CD; cassette	Virgin	
Japan	July 18, 2001	CD	Sony Music Japan	

== See also ==
- List of number-one R&B singles of 2001 (U.S.)
- List of best-selling singles in the United States
