= Save the Day (Mariah Carey song) =

2020 single by Mariah Carey featuring Ms. Lauryn Hill

Single by Mariah Carey and Ms. Lauryn Hill

from the album The Rarities
- Released: August 21, 2020
- Recorded: 2020
- Studio: The Mermaid Room (New York, NY)
- Genre: R&B
- Length: 3:48
- Label: Columbia; Legacy
- Songwriters: Mariah Carey; Jermaine Dupri; James "Big Jim" Wright; Charles Fox; Norman Gimbel
- Producers: Mariah Carey; Jermaine Dupri

Mariah Carey singles chronology
"In the Mix" (2019)	"Save the Day" (2020)	"Out Here on My Own" (2020)

Lauryn Hill singles chronology
"We Got Love" (2020)	"Save the Day" (2020)

Audio video
- "Save the Day" on YouTube

"Save the Day" is a song recorded by American singer-songwriter Mariah Carey. It was released on August 21, 2020 as the lead single from her eighth compilation album, The Rarities (2020) by Columbia and Legacy Records. The music was composed by Carey, and the lyrics and melody were written by Carey, Jermaine Dupri, James "Big Jim" Wright, Charles Fox, and Norman Gimbel. Carey and Dupri produced it.

The song samples vocals from American singer and rapper Lauryn Hill on the song "Killing Me Softly" (1996) by the Fugees, therefore Hill is credited as a featured artist. In 2020, The Guardian ranked the song as the 30th greatest Mariah Carey single, and Billboard ranked it as the 60th greatest song of her career, that same year.

== Background ==
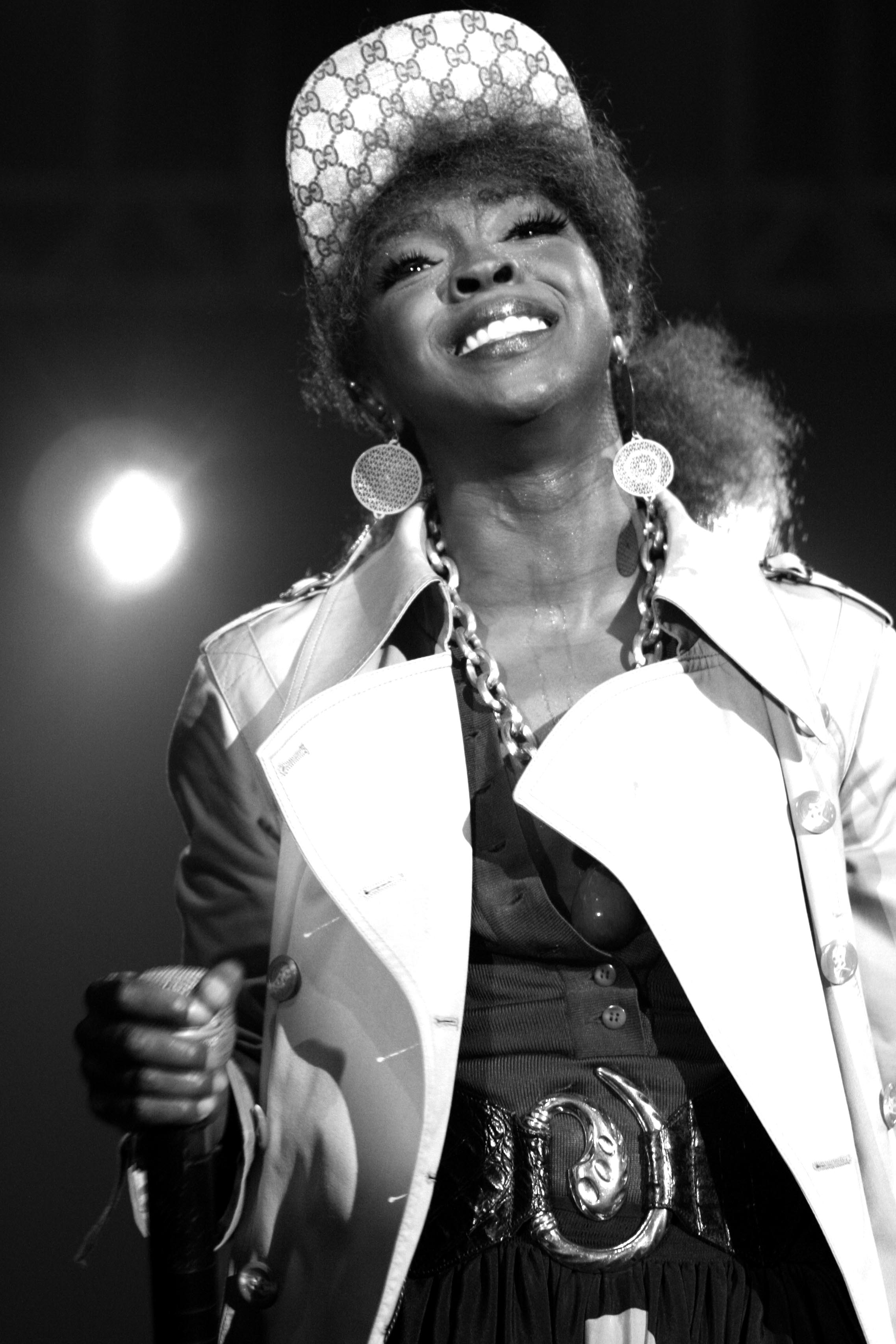
The song was praised for the interpolation of Ms. Lauryn Hill's (pictured) vocals.

Carey and longtime collaborator Jermaine Dupri began working on the song in February 2011. Originally, the idea was to reunite a variety of musicians to conceive the song as a charity single. The inspiration for the song comes from Points of Light Institute. In March 2011, Carey's representative Cindi Berger stated that royalties for "Save The Day", which was originally written for Carey's fourteenth studio album, Me. I Am Mariah... The Elusive Chanteuse (2014), would be donated to charities that bring awareness to human rights issues. Berger also said that "Mariah has and continues to donate her time, money and countless hours of personal service to many organizations both here and abroad".

On February 11, 2012, Carey stated on her Twitter account that the song was "in a holding pattern for a very special reason, to be revealed at a later date". Prior to the song release in 2020, Carey and Dupri believed that it was an appropriate time to release the song, with the former commenting, "the lyrics are so apropos to this exact moment".

== Promotion and release ==
On August 19, 2020, Carey announced that "Save the Day" would be released as the lead single from her eighth compilation album The Rarities. A day before the song's release, Carey premiered the song during a Zoom virtual private listening party. The song was released on August 21, 2020.

== Music video ==
On September 13, 2020, Carey delivered a debut television performance of "Save the Day" as part of the U.S. Open Women's Final broadcast. The video featured clips of female tennis stars like Venus and Serena Williams, Billie Jean King, Naomi Osaka, Coco Gauff, and more. Carey tweeted in response saying that she "couldn’t be more honored and moved to share the message of the song with these incredible female champions." The video was filmed outside the Billie Jean King National Tennis Center. Carey spoke on the video in an Oprah Conversation interview saying,

"Our country is at a critical moment in history, and I felt compelled to do what I could using my platform of music to encourage us all to take action ... My hope is that the "Save the Day" video will serve as an inspiring message and spark meaningful dialogue and action across the country, for each of us to do our part to save the day. The lyrics of this song are all about doing your part to make a difference and highlighting the impact that each of us can make. Whether you're an essential worker, a protester, a student, a young parent making it work, or a first-time voter, we each have a duty to support our communities".

On October 23, 2020, to further promote the song, Carey released a lyric video for the song which encouraged viewers to vote as well as paying tribute to "Breonna Taylor, Congressman John Lewis, trans activist and writer Raquel Willis, Sojourner Truth, Frederick Douglass, and essential workers on the frontlines of the pandemic, with portraits drawn by artist Molly Crabapple."

== Critical reception ==
The song has received mixed-to-positive reviews. Joe Lynch of Billboard stated that "if you combine the powers of Mariah Carey and Ms. Lauryn Hill, you're off to a strong start. He went on to say that "With heartfelt, affecting vocals delivering a timely message, [...] a few classic Mariah high notes and a sick beat drop courtesy Jermaine Dupri that accompanies the entrance of Ms. Lauryn Hill's voice" and that the song is "pure MC goodness." Rachel Hunt of Showbiz stated that although fans were disappointed that Lauryn Hill "did not add anything new to the recording" it is still a "towering achievement." Chris Murphy of Vulture called both Carey and Hill the "90's Queens" and that the song sees both "at the height of their powers, saving the day, and channeling the ’90s while they’re at it". He went on to say that Carey "breaks out the whistle tone, while Lauryn raps and interpolates her classic." In a negative review, Jeremy Helligar writer for Variety, stated the song was a "rare lyrical misstep" which "contains a timely sentiment, but what the world needs now is something more probing and specific than another string of peace homilies."

== Charts ==
Chart (2020)	Peak position
Belgium (Ultratip Bubbling Under Wallonia)	38
Hungary (Single Top 40)	23
Scottish Singles Sales (Official Charts)	46
UK Singles Downloads (Official Charts)	36
US Digital Song Sales (Billboard)	15
US Hot R&B Songs (Billboard)	12
