= Miho Nakayama discography =

- Studio albums: 22
- Live albums: 2
- Compilation albums: 17
- Singles: 39
- Video albums: 17 (Note: This includes the music video compilation albums and concert DVDs.)
- Remix albums: 4
- Box sets: 3 (Note: This includes the video box sets.)

The discography of the Japanese singer/actress Miho Nakayama consists of 22 studio albums, 17 compilation albums, and 39 singles released since 1985.

== Albums ==
=== Studio albums ===
Year	Information	Oricon weekly peak position	Sales	RIAJ certification
1985	C: Released: August 21, 1985; Label: King Records; Formats: LP, CD, cassette	11	90,000	
1985	After School: Released: December 18, 1985; Label: King Records; Formats: LP, CD, cassette	13	95,000	
1986	Summer Breeze: Released: July 1, 1986; Label: King Records; Formats: LP, CD, cassette	8	77,000	
1986	Exotique: Released: December 18, 1986; Label: King Records; Formats: LP, CD, cassette	6	206,000	
1987	One and Only: Released: July 15, 1987; Label: King Records; Formats: LP, CD, cassette	3	153,000	
1988	Catch the Nite: Released: February 10, 1988; Label: King Records; Formats: LP, CD, cassette	1	349,000	
1988	Mind Game: Released: July 11, 1988; Label: King Records; Formats: LP, CD, cassette	2	252,000	
1988	Angel Hearts: Released: December 5, 1988; Label: King Records; Formats: LP, CD, cassette	3	250,000	
1989	Hide 'n' Seek: Released: September 5, 1989; Label: King Records; Formats: LP, CD, cassette	1	190,000	Gold
1989	Merry Merry: Released: December 5, 1989; Label: King Records; Formats: CD, cassette	9	111,000	
1990	All for You: Released: March 16, 1990; Label: King Records; Formats: CD, cassette	3	124,000	Gold
1990	Jeweluna: Released: July 18, 1990; Label: King Records; Formats: CD, cassette	3	112,000	
1991	Dé eaya: Released: March 15, 1991; Label: King Records; Formats: CD, cassette	2	125,000	
1992	Mellow: Released: June 10, 1992; Label: King Records; Formats: CD, cassette	3	140,000	Gold
1993	Wagamama na Actress: Released: June 23, 1993; Label: King Records; Formats: CD, cassette	4	145,000	Gold
1994	Pure White: Released: June 8, 1994; Label: King Records; Formats: CD, cassette	3	112,000	
1995	Mid Blue: Released: September 30, 1995; Label: King Records; Formats: CD, cassette	7	145,000	
1996	Deep Lip French: Released: June 1, 1996; Label: King Records; Formats: CD, cassette	13	80,000	
1997	Groovin' Blue: Released: June 21, 1997; Label: King Records; Formats: CD, cassette	28	22,000	
1998	Olive: Released: June 10, 1998; Label: King Records; Formats: CD, cassette	9	34,000	
1999	Manifesto: Released: September 16, 1999; Label: King Records; Formats: CD, cassette	29	12,000	
2019	Neuf Neuf: Released: December 4, 2019; Label: King Records; Formats: CD, digital	28		

=== Live albums ===
Year	Information	Oricon weekly peak position	Sales	RIAJ certification
1986	Virgin Flight '86: Miho Nakayama First Concert: Released: August 1, 1986; Label: King Records; Formats: LP, CD, cassette	19	48,000	
1994	Pure White Live '94: Released: November 23, 1994; Label: King Records; Formats: CD, cassette	18	84,000	

=== Compilations ===
Year	Information	Oricon weekly peak position	Sales	RIAJ certification
1987	Collection: Released: November 15, 1987; Label: King Records; Formats: LP, CD, cassette	1	542,000	
1989	Ballads: Released: March 20, 1989; Label: King Records; Formats: LP, CD, cassette	2	195,000	Gold
1990	Collection II: Released: November 21, 1990; Label: King Records; Formats: CD, cassette	2	392,000	Platinum
1991	Miho's Select: Released: December 24, 1991; Label: King Records; Formats: CD, cassette	3	332,000	Platinum
1993	Dramatic Songs: Released: January 20, 1993; Label: King Records; Formats: CD, cassette	2	435,000	Platinum
1993	Blanket Privacy: Released: November 26, 1993; Label: King Records; Formats: CD, cassette	9	89,000	Gold
1995	Collection III: Released: March 1, 1995; Label: King Records; Formats: CD, cassette	3	590,000	Platinum
1996	Ballads II: Released: December 18, 1996; Label: King Records; Formats: CD, cassette	25	41,000	
1997	Treasury: Released: April 7, 1997; Label: King Records; Formats: CD, cassette	3	333,000	Gold
2001	Your Selection 1: Released: March 7, 2001; Label: King Records; Formats: Enhanced CD	28	9,000	
2001	Your Selection 2: Released: March 7, 2001; Label: King Records; Formats: Enhanced CD	62	5,000	
2001	Your Selection 3: Released: March 7, 2001; Label: King Records; Formats: Enhanced CD	67	4,000	
2001	Your Selection 4: Released: March 7, 2001; Label: King Records; Formats: Enhanced CD	68	4,000	
2006	Collection IV: Released: February 1, 2006; Label: King Records; Formats: CD	>300		
2010	Miho Nakayama Perfect Best: Released: July 7, 2010; Label: King Records; Formats: 2CD, digital	105		
2013	Miho Nakayama Perfect Best 2: Released: October 2, 2013; Label: King Records; Formats: CD, digital	133		
2020	All Time Best: Released: December 23, 2020; Label: King Records; Formats: 3CD, 3CD + Blu-ray, digital	29		

=== Box sets ===
Year	Information	Oricon weekly peak position	Sales	RIAJ certification
2006	Complete Singles Box: Released: March 1, 2006; Label: King Records; Formats: 10CD + DVD	147		
2015	30th Anniversary: The Perfect Singles Box: Released: July 22, 2015; Label: King Records; Formats: 40CD + DVD	169		

=== Remix albums ===
Year	Information	Oricon weekly peak position	Sales	RIAJ certification
1988	Makin' Dancin': Released: October 21, 1988; Label: King Records; Formats: LP, CD, cassette	2	183,000	
1991	Dance Box: Released: July 25, 1991; Label: King Records; Formats: CD, cassette	3	138,000	
1997	The Remixes: Miho Nakayama Meets New York Groove: Released: December 3, 1997; Label: King Records; Formats: EP, CD, cassette	57	5,000	
1998	The Remixes: Miho Nakayama Meets Los Angeles Groove: Released: January 9, 1998; Label: King Records; Formats: EP, CD, cassette	80	4,000	

== Singles ==
=== Regular singles ===
List of singles, with selected chart positions
Title	Date	Peak chart positions	Sales (JPN)	RIAJ certification	Album
Title	Date	Oricon Singles Charts	Sales (JPN)	RIAJ certification	Album
"C"	June 21, 1985	12	170,000		C
"Namaiki"	October 1, 1985	8	114,000		After School
"Be-Bop High School"	December 5, 1985	4	179,000		Collection
"Iro White Blend"	February 5, 1986	5	223,000		Collection
"Close Up"	May 16, 1986	4	128,000		Summer Breeze
"Jingi Aishite Moraimasu"	July 15, 1986	4	138,000		Collection
"Tsuiteru ne Notteru ne"	August 21, 1986	3	192,000		Collection
"Waku Waku Sasete"	November 21, 1986	3	237,000		Exotique
"Hade!!!"	March 18, 1987	2	205,000		Collection
"50/50"	July 7, 1987	2	211,000		Collection
"Catch Me"	October 7, 1987	1	218,000		Catch the Nite
"You're My Only Shinin' Star"	February 17, 1988	1	293,000		Ballads
"Mermaid"	July 11, 1988	1	365,000		Collection II
"Witches"	November 14, 1988	1	314,000		Angel Hearts
"Rosécolor"	February 21, 1989	1	277,000	Gold	Collection II
"Virgin Eyes"	July 12, 1989	2	254,000	Gold	Hide 'n' Seek
"Midnight Taxi"	January 15, 1990	1	181,000	Gold	All for You
"Semi-sweet Magic"	March 21, 1990	3	122,000		All for You
"Megamitachi no Bōken"	July 11, 1990	3	119,000		Jeweluna
"Aishiterutte Iwanai!"	October 22, 1990	3	361,000	Gold	Collection II
"Kore kara no I Love You"	February 12, 1991	3	145,000		Jeweluna
"Rosa"	July 16, 1991	3	362,000	Gold	Miho's Select
"Tōi Machi no Doko ka de..."	November 1, 1991	3	673,000	Platinum	Miho's Select
"Mellow"	April 1, 1992	3	169,000	Gold	Mellow
"Sekaijū no Dare Yori Kitto" (Miho Nakayama & Wands)	October 28, 1992	1	1,833,000	4× Platinum	Dramatic Songs
"Shiawase ni Naru Tame ni"	April 21, 1993	4	414,000	Platinum	Blanket Privacy
"Anata ni Nara..."	July 7, 1993	8	280,000	Gold	Blanket Privacy
"Tada Nakitaku Naru no"	February 9, 1994	1	1,048,000	3× Platinum	Collection III
"Sea Paradise (OL no Hanran)"	June 8, 1994	9	154,000	Gold	Pure White
"Hero"	December 14, 1994	8	474,000	Platinum	Collection III
"Cheers for You"	May 17, 1995	17	127,000	Gold	Collection IV
"Hurt to Heart (Itami no Yukue)"	July 21, 1995	10	319,000	Gold	Mid Blue
"Thinking About You (Anata no Yoru wo Tsutsumitai)"	February 16, 1996	13	107,000		Deep Lip French
"True Romance"	June 7, 1996	37	38,000		Deep Lip French
"Mirai e no Present" (Miho Nakayama with Mayo)	November 1, 1996	6	409,000	Platinum	Treasury
"March Color"	June 4, 1997	29	25,000		Groovin' Blue
"Love Clover"	April 8, 1998	14	38,000	Gold	Your Selection 1
"A Place Under the Sun"	May 19, 1999	40	10,000		Your Selection 1
"Adore"	September 16, 1999	35	11,000		Collection IV
"—" denotes releases that did not chart.

=== Digital-only singles ===
List of singles
Title	Date	Notes
"Stardust"	July 7, 2000	Originally released exclusively on Nakayama's online fan club.
"Lagrimas Negras"	October 20, 2000	Originally released exclusively on Nakayama's online fan club.
"Kimi ga Iru kara"	December 16, 2000	Originally released exclusively on Nakayama's online fan club.
"I Am with You (Tōku Hanare Tete mo)"	March 20, 2011	Written by Nakayama and Hitonari Tsuji and released online to support the victims of the 2011 Tōhoku earthquake and tsunami.

== Other recordings ==
As a featured artist

List of singles
Title	Artist	Date	Notes
"Ninna Nanna"	Night Tempo	September 5, 2023	Fifth single from Night Tempo's second studio album Neo Standard. Lyrics by Nakayama.

== Videography ==
=== Music video and image albums ===
List of media, with selected chart positions
Title	Album details	Peak positions		Sales (Oricon)
Title	Album details	JPN DVD	JPN Blu-ray	Sales (Oricon)
Na-ma-i-ki	Released: November 21, 1985; Label: King Records; Formats: LD, VHS	—	—	N/A
Kokoro no Yoake: L'Aube de mon cœur	Released: December 21, 1988; Label: King Records; Formats: LD, VHS	—	—	N/A
Bi Fantasy: Nakayama Miho Oshare no Subete	Released: September 10, 1990; Label: King Records; Formats: LD, VHS	—	—	N/A
Love Supreme: Miho Selection '90	Released: December 5, 1990; Label: King Records; Formats: LD, VHS	—	—	N/A
Destiny	Released: December 21, 1990; Label: King Records; Formats: LD, VHS	—	—	N/A
Mellow	Released: July 4, 1992; Label: King Records; Formats: LD, VHS	—	—	N/A

=== Live video albums ===
List of media, with selected chart positions
Title	Album details	Peak positions		Sales (Oricon)
Title	Album details	JPN DVD	JPN Blu-ray	Sales (Oricon)
Virgin Flight '86: Miho Nakayama First Concert	Released: July 21, 1986; Label: King Records; Formats: LD, VHS	—	—	N/A
Catch Me: Miho Nakayama Live '88	Released: April 5, 1988; Label: King Records; Formats: LD, VHS	—	—	N/A
Whuu! Natural Live at Budokan '89	Released: July 5, 1989; Label: King Records; Formats: LD, VHS	—	—	N/A
Miho Nakayama Concert Tour '91: Miho the Future, Miho the Nature	Released: July 21, 1991; Label: King Records; Formats: LD, VHS	—	—	N/A
Live in Mellow: Miho Nakayama Concert Tour '92	Released: December 4, 1992; Label: King Records; Formats: LD, VHS	—	—	N/A
Miho Nakayama Concert Tour '93: On My Mind	Released: December 10, 1993; Label: King Records; Formats: LD, VHS	—	—	N/A
Miho Nakayama Concert Tour '95: F	Released: March 16, 1996; Label: King Records; Formats: LD, VHS	—	—	N/A
Miho Nakayama Concert Tour '96: Sound of Lip	Released: December 21, 1996; Label: King Records; Formats: LD, VHS	—	—	N/A
Miho Nakayama Tour '98: Live O Live	Released: December 23, 1998; Label: King Records; Formats: LD, VHS	—	—	N/A
Miho Nakayama 38th Anniversary Concert: Trois	Released: November 22, 2023; Label: King Records; Formats: Blu-ray	—	—	N/A
Miho Nakayama Concert Tour 2024: Deux	Released: November 27, 2024; Label: King Records; Formats: Blu-ray	—	20	N/A

=== Video box sets ===
List of media, with selected chart positions
Title	Album details	Peak positions		Sales (Oricon)
Title	Album details	JPN DVD	JPN Blu-ray	Sales (Oricon)
Miho Nakayama Complete DVD Box	Released: July 24, 2003; Label: King Records; Formats: DVD	—	—	N/A
Miho Nakayama 40th Anniversary: The Best Ten	Released: March 19, 2025; Label: King Records; Formats: Blu-ray	—	4	N/A

== Video games ==
List of video games
Title	Platform(s)	Game details
Nakayama Miho no Tokimeki High School	Famicom Disk System	Released: December 1, 1987; Publisher: Nintendo

== See also ==
- List of best-selling music artists in Japan
