= 30th Anniversary: The Perfect Singles Box =

Box set by Miho Nakayama
- Released: July 22, 2015
- Recorded: 1985–2000
- Genres: J-pop; kayōkyoku; dance-pop; teen pop; city pop; pop rock; R&B
- Languages: Japanese; English; Spanish
- Label: King Records

Miho Nakayama chronology
Perfect Best 2 (2013)	30th Anniversary: The Perfect Singles Box (2015)	Neuf Neuf (2019)

30th Anniversary: The Perfect Singles Box is a box set by Japanese entertainer Miho Nakayama. Released through King Records on July 22, 2015, to commemorate Nakayama's 30th anniversary, the box set compiles all of Nakayama's singles from 1985 to 2000 in 40 CDs. Each CD is packaged in a reprint of the single's original vinyl cover; singles originally released on mini CD only have been given new vinyl-style covers. Also included is a DVD containing live clips of the singles.

The box set peaked at No. 169 on Oricon's albums chart.

== Track listing ==
Disc 1: C
No.	Title	Lyrics	Music	Arrangement	Length
1.	"C"	Takashi Matsumoto	Kyōhei Tsutsumi	Mitsuo Hagita
2.	"Speed Way" (Supīdo Uei (スピード・ウェイ))	Matsumoto	Tetsuji Hayashi	Hagita
3.	"C" (Album Version)
4.	"Speed Way" (Album Version)
5.	"Dance with C [Ultimix Part 2]" (from Makin' Dancin')
6.	"C" (Original Karaoke)
7.	"Speed Way" (Original Karaoke)

Disc 2: Namaiki
No.	Title	Lyrics	Music	Arrangement	Length
1.	"Namaiki" ((生意気; "Saucy"))	Matsumoto	Tsutsumi	Motoki Funayama
2.	"U"	Yūho Iwasato	Mio Iwasato	Hagita
3.	"Namaiki" (Original Karaoke)
4.	"U" (Original Karaoke)

Disc 3: Be-Bop High School
No.	Title	Lyrics	Music	Arrangement	Length
1.	"Be-Bop High School"	Matsumoto	Tsutsumi	Hagita
2.	"Hōkago" ((放課後; "After School"))	Matsumoto	Tsutsumi	Hiroshi Shinkawa
3.	"From Be-Bop High School" (from Dance Box)
4.	"Be-Bop High School" (Original Karaoke)
5.	"Hōkago" (Original Karaoke)

Disc 4: Iro White Blend
No.	Title	Lyrics	Music	Arrangement	Length
1.	"Iro White Blend" (Iro Howaito Burendo (色・ホワイトブレンド; "Colored White Blend"))	Mariya Takeuchi	Takeuchi	Nobuyuki Shimizu
2.	"Tokimeki no Season" (Tokimeki no Shīzun (ときめきの季節（シーズン）; "Crush Season"))	Takeuchi	Takeuchi	Shimizu
3.	"Iro White Blend" (Original Karaoke)
4.	"Tokimeki no Season" (Original Karaoke)

Disc 5: Close Up
No.	Title	Lyrics	Music	Arrangement	Length
1.	"Close Up" (Kurōzu Appu (クローズ・アップ))	Matsumoto	Kazuo Zaitsu	Masaaki Ōmura
2.	"Hitomi no Kageri" ((瞳のかげり; "Shadow of the Eyes"))	Matsumoto	Zaitsu	Tatsumi Yano
3.	"Close Up" (Album Version)
4.	"Close Up" (Original Karaoke)
5.	"Hitomi no Kageri" (Original Karaoke)

Disc 6: Jingi Aishite Moraimasu
No.	Title	Lyrics	Music	Arrangement	Length
1.	"Jingi Aishite Moraimasu" ((JINGI・愛してもらいます; "Jingi, I Want You to Love Me"))	Matsumoto	Tetsuya Komuro	Ōmura
2.	"Rising Love"	Toshiki Kadomatsu	Kadomatsu	Kadomatsu
3.	"Jingi Aishite Moraimasu" (Original Karaoke)
4.	"Rising Love" (Original Karaoke)

Disc 7: Tsuiteru ne Notteru ne
No.	Title	Lyrics	Music	Arrangement	Length
1.	"Tsuiteru ne Notteru ne" ((ツイてるねノッてるね; "It's Crazy, It's Knocking"))	Matsumoto	Tsutsumi	Ōmura; Funayama
2.	"Nakanai wa" ((放課後; "I Won't Cry"))	Matsumoto	Tsutsumi	Ōmura
3.	"Tsuiteru ne Notteru ne" (Album Version)
4.	"Tsuiteru ne Notteru ne" (Original Karaoke)
5.	"Nakanai wa" (Original Karaoke)

Disc 8: Waku Waku Sasete
No.	Title	Lyrics	Music	Arrangement	Length
1.	"Waku Waku Sasete" ((WAKU WAKUさせて; "Excite Me More"))	Matsumoto	Tsutsumi	Funayama
2.	"Heart no Switch wo Oshite" (Hāto no Suitchi wo Oshite (ハートのスイッチを押して; "Press the Heart Switch"))	Matsumoto	Tsutsumi	Funayama
3.	"Waku Waku Sasete" (Party Version)
4.	"Waku Waku Sasete" (Party Version Instrumental)
5.	"From Waku Waku Sasete" (from Dance Box)			ATOM
6.	"Switch On" (from Miho's Select)
7.	"Waku Waku Sasete" (Original Karaoke)
8.	"Heart no Switch wo Oshite" (Original Karaoke)

Disc 9: Hade!!!
No.	Title	Lyrics	Music	Arrangement	Length
1.	"Hade!!!" ((「派手!!!」; "Flashy!!!"))	Matsumoto	Tsutsumi	Funayama
2.	"Jealousy" (Jerashī (ジェラシー))	Matsumoto	Tsutsumi	Funayama
3.	"Hade!!!" (Original Karaoke)
4.	"Jealousy" (Original Karaoke)

Disc 10: 50/50
No.	Title	Lyrics	Music	Arrangement	Length
1.	"50/50"	Shun Taguchi	Komuro	Funayama
2.	"Nanamena Ai wo Yurushite" ((斜めな愛を許して; "Forgive the Diagonal Love"))	Mami Ayukawa	Ayukawa	Shirō Sagisu
3.	"50/50" (Original Karaoke)
4.	"Nanamena Ai wo Yurushite" (Original Karaoke)

Disc 11: Catch Me
No.	Title	Lyrics	Music	Arrangement	Length
1.	"Catch Me"	Kadomatsu	Kadomatsu	Kadomatsu
2.	"Bad Boy"	Taguchi	HALNEN	Sagisu
3.	"Catch Me" (Album Version)
4.	"Bad Boy" (Another Version)
5.	"Catch Me in Euro [Ultimix Part 1]" (from Makin' Dancin')	Kadomatsu; Takeuchi; Matsumoto	Kadomatsu; Takeuchi; Tsutsumi
6.	"From Catch Me" (from Dance Box)			ATOM
7.	"Catch Me" (Original Karaoke)
8.	"Bad Boy" (Original Karaoke)

Disc 12: You're My Only Shinin' Star
No.	Title	Lyrics	Music	Arrangement	Length
1.	"You're My Only Shinin' Star"	Kadomatsu	Kadomatsu	Kadomatsu; Kazuo Ōtani (strings); Shin Kazuhara (brass)
2.	"Sherry"	Kadomatsu	Kadomatsu	Kadomatsu
3.	"You're My Only Shinin' Star" (Album Version)
4.	"You're My Only Shinin' Star (Present from Miho)" (from Hide 'n' Seek)			Kazuo Ōtani
5.	"'91 You're My Only Shinin' Star" (from Miho's Select)			Hiroshi Narumi
6.	"You're My Only Shinin' Star '93" (from Blanket Privacy)			ATOM
7.	"You're My Only Shinin' Star [Remix]" (from The Remixes: Miho Nakayama Meets New York Groove)
8.	"You're My Only Shinin' Star" (Original Karaoke)
9.	"Sherry" (Original Karaoke)

Disc 13: Mermaid
No.	Title	Lyrics	Music	Arrangement	Length
1.	"Mermaid" (Māmeido (人魚姫 mermaid))	Chinfa Kan	Cindy	Rod Antoon
2.	"In the Morning"	Masumi Kawamura	Toshinobu Kubota	Takao Sugiyama
3.	"Funky Mermaid [M.I.D. Dance Mix]" (from Makin' Dancin')	Kan; Taguchi; Matsumoto	Cindy; Komuro; Zaitsu; Tsutsumi
4.	"From Mermaid" (from Dance Box)			ATOM
5.	"In the Morning" (Album Version)
6.	"Mermaid" (Original Karaoke)
7.	"In the Morning" (Original Karaoke)

Disc 14: Witches
No.	Title	Lyrics	Music	Arrangement	Length
1.	"Witches"	Kan	Cindy	Yūji Toriyama
2.	"Chikai wo Yabutte" ((誓いを破って; "Break the Vow"))	Kan	Cindy	Kunio Muramatsu
3.	"Witches" (Album Version)
4.	"Witches" (Original Karaoke)
5.	"Chikai wo Yabutte" (Original Karaoke)

Disc 15: Rosécolor
No.	Title	Lyrics	Music	Arrangement	Length
1.	"Rosécolor"	Kan	Cindy	Toriyama
2.	"You and I"	Cindy	Greg Moore	Toriyama
3.	"Rosécolor" (Original Karaoke)
4.	"You and I" (Original Karaoke)

Disc 16: Virgin Eyes
No.	Title	Lyrics	Music	Arrangement	Length
1.	"Virgin Eyes"	Yumi Yoshimoto	Anri	Yasuharu Ogura
2.	"Sanctuary" (Sankuchuari (サンクチュアリ〜Sanctuary〜))	Yoshimoto	Anri	Ogura; Kazuo Ōtani (strings)
3.	"Virgin Eyes [Soundtrack Version]" (from the Who Do I Choose? soundtrack)
4.	"Virgin Eyes [Edit Version]" (from Hide 'n' Seek)
5.	"Virgin Eyes" (Original Karaoke)
6.	"Sanctuary" (Original Karaoke)

Disc 17: Midnight Taxi
No.	Title	Lyrics	Music	Arrangement	Length
1.	"Midnight Taxi"	Ryō Asuka	Asuka	Tomoji Sogawa
2.	"Honki Demo..." ((本気でも…; "Seriously..."))	Asuka	Asuka	Sogawa
3.	"Midnight Taxi" (Album Version)
4.	"Midnight Taxi ['93 Album Version]" (from Blanket Privacy)
5.	"Midnight Taxi" (Original Karaoke)
6.	"Honki Demo..." (Original Karaoke)

Disc 18: Semi-sweet Magic
No.	Title	Lyrics	Music	Arrangement	Length
1.	"Semi-sweet Magic" (Semisūīto no Mahō (セミスウィートの魔法))	Gorō Matsui	Cindy	Antoon; Cindy (chorus)
2.	"Save Your Love"	Miho Nakayama	Cindy	Toriyama
3.	"Semi-sweet Magic" (Album Version)
4.	"Semi-sweet Magic" (Original Karaoke)
5.	"Save Your Love" (Original Karaoke)

Disc 19: Megamitachi no Bōken
No.	Title	Lyrics	Music	Arrangement	Length
1.	"Megamitachi no Bōken" ((女神たちの冒険; "The Adventures of the Goddesses"))	Matsui	Hideo Saitō	Saitō
2.	"Too Fast, Too Close [Dance Version]"	Cindy	Cindy	Toriyama
3.	"Megamitachi no Bōken" (Album Version)
4.	"Too Fast, Too Close" (Album Version)
5.	"Megamitachi no Bōken" (Original Karaoke)
6.	"Too Fast, Too Close [Dance Version]" (Original Karaoke)

Disc 20: Aishiterutte Iwanai!
No.	Title	Lyrics	Music	Arrangement	Length
1.	"Aishiterutte Iwanai!" ((愛してるっていわない!; "I Don't Love You!"))	Yoshihiko Andō	Hitoshi Haba	Nobuhiko Kashiwara
2.	"Without You"	Mizuho Kitayama	Kazuo Ōtani	Ōtani
3.	"Aishiterutte Iwanai!" (Original Karaoke)
4.	"Without You" (Original Karaoke)

Disc 21: Kore kara no I Love You
No.	Title	Lyrics	Music	Arrangement	Length
1.	"Kore kara no I Love You" ((これからのI Love You; "This Is I Love You"))	Matsui	Kenjirō Sakiya	ATOM Project; Sakiya (strings)
2.	"Dara ka ga Ai ni..." ((誰かが愛に…; "Someone Loves..."))	Nakayama	Masaya Ozeki	ATOM Project
3.	"Kore kara no I Love You" (Album Version)
4.	"Kore kara no I Love You" (Original Karaoke)
5.	"Dara ka ga Ai ni..." (Original Karaoke)

Disc 22: Rosa
No.	Title	Lyrics	Music	Arrangement	Length
1.	"Rosa"	Issaque	Yoshimasa Inoue	ATOM
2.	"Dream"	Issaque	Inoue	ATOM
3.	"Rosa" (Album Version)
4.	"From Rosa" (from Dance Box)
5.	"Rosa" (Original Karaoke)
6.	"Dream" (Original Karaoke)

Disc 23: Tōi Machi no Doko ka de...
No.	Title	Lyrics	Music	Arrangement	Length
1.	"Tōi Machi no Doko ka de..." ((遠い街のどこかで…; "Somewhere in a Distant City..."))	Mika Watanabe	Hideya Nakazaki	Nakazaki
2.	"Tell Me"	Watanabe	Watanabe	Yōichi Yamazaki
3.	"Tōi Machi no Doko ka de... [Remix version]" (from The Remixes: Miho Nakayama Meets New York Groove)
4.	"Tell Me" (Album Version)
5.	"Tōi Machi no Doko ka de..." (Original Karaoke)
6.	"Tell Me" (Original Karaoke)

Disc 24: Mellow
No.	Title	Lyrics	Music	Arrangement	Length
1.	"Mellow"	Issaque	Inoue	Inoue
2.	"Silent"	Nakayama	Chiho Kiyooka	Yoshio Tsuru
3.	"Mellow" (CM Version)
4.	"Mellow" (Original Karaoke)
5.	"Silent" (Original Karaoke)

Disc 25: Sekaijū no Dare Yori Kitto
No.	Title	Lyrics	Music	Arrangement	Length
1.	"Sekaijū no Dare Yori Kitto" ((世界中の誰よりきっと; "Surely More Than Anyone in the World"))	Show Wesugi; Nakayama	Tetsurō Oda	Takeshi Hayama
2.	"Sekaijū no Dare Yori Kitto (Part II)"	Wesugi; Nakayama	Oda	Hayama
3.	"Sekaijū no Dare Yori Kitto (Part II)" (Album Version)
4.	"Sekaijū no Dare Yori Kitto" (Original Karaoke with no vocals)
5.	"Sekaijū no Dare Yori Kitto" (Original Karaoke with Wands chorus)

Disc 26: Shiawase ni Naru Tame ni
No.	Title	Lyrics	Music	Arrangement	Length
1.	"Shiawase ni Naru Tame ni" ((幸せになるために; "To Be Happy"))	Yūho Iwasato; Nakayama	Toshifumi Hinata	Hinata
2.	"P.S. Natsu no Kuni kara" ((P.S. 夏の国から; "P.S. From a Summer Country"))	Yui Nishiwaki	Nishiwaki	Nobuo Ariga
3.	"Shiawase ni Naru Tame ni" (Original Karaoke)
4.	"P.S. Natsu no Kuni kara" (Original Karaoke)

Disc 27: Anata ni Nara...
No.	Title	Lyrics	Music	Arrangement	Length
1.	"Anata ni Nara..." ((あなたになら…; "For You..."))	Nakayama	Joe Hisaishi	Hisaishi
2.	"Holiday"	Mami Takubo	Ozeki	URAN
3.	"Anata ni Nara... [OST Version]" (from the Samurai Kids soundtrack)
4.	"Anata ni Nara..." (Album Version)
5.	"Anata ni Nara..." (Original Karaoke)
6.	"Holiday" (Original Karaoke)

Disc 28: Tada Nakitaku Naru no
No.	Title	Lyrics	Music	Arrangement	Length
1.	"Tada Nakitaku Naru no" ((ただ泣きたくなるの; "I Just Feel Like Crying"))	Yurie Kokubu; Nakayama	Masaki Iwamoto	Iwamoto
2.	"Tada Nakitaku Naru no" (Another Edition)			ATOM+1
3.	"Tada Nakitaku Naru no" (Original Karaoke)

Disc 29: Sea Paradise (OL no Hanran)
No.	Title	Lyrics	Music	Arrangement	Length
1.	"Sea Paradise (OL no Hanran)" ((Sea Paradise -OLの反乱-; "Sea Paradise -An Office Lady's Rebellion-"))	Nakayama	KNACK	ATOM
2.	"Nando demo Aiseru kara" ((何度でも愛せるから; "I Can Love You Again and Again"))	Nakayama	Nakayama	ATOM
3.	"Sea Paradise (OL no Hanran)" (Album Version)
4.	"Sea Paradise (OL no Hanran) [Remix Version]" (from The Remixes: Miho Nakayama Meets New York Groove)
5.	"Sea Paradise (OL no Hanran)" (Original Karaoke)
6.	"Nando demo Aiseru kara" (Original Karaoke)

Disc 30: Hero
No.	Title	Lyrics	Music	Arrangement	Length
1.	"Hero"	Mariah Carey; Nakayama	Carey; Walter Afanasieff	Robbie Buchanan
2.	"Hero" (a Cappella Version)	Carey; Nakayama	Carey; Afanasieff	Cindy; Narumi
3.	"Hero" (Original Karaoke)
4.	"Hero (a Cappella Version)" (Original Karaoke)

Disc 31: Cheers for You
No.	Title	Lyrics	Music	Arrangement	Length
1.	"Cheers for You"	Masato Odake; Nakayama	Kubota	Camus Celli; Andres Levin
2.	"Cheers for You" (Dance Mix)	Odake; Nakayama	Kubota	Celli; Levin; "Bonzai" Jim Caruso (Remix)
3.	"Cheers for You" (Original Karaoke)

Disc 32: Hurt to Heart (Itami no Yukue)
No.	Title	Lyrics	Music	Arrangement	Length
1.	"Hurt to Heart (Itami no Yukue)" ((Hurt to Heart〜痛みの行方〜; "Hurt to Heart ~Whereabouts of Pain~"))	Keiko Yokoyama	Yokoyama	Jerry Hey
2.	"I Love You"	Nakayama	Cindy	Hey
3.	"Hurt to Heart (Itami no Yukue)" (Original Karaoke)
4.	"I Love You" (Original Karaoke)

Disc 33: Thinking About You (Anata no Yoru wo Tsutsumitai)
No.	Title	Lyrics	Music	Arrangement	Length
1.	"Thinking About You (Anata no Yoru wo Tsutsumitai)" ((Thinking about you〜あなたの夜を包みたい〜; "Thinking About You ~I Want to Wrap Your Night~"))	Odake	Maria	Ōtani
2.	"Angel"	Nakayama; Odake	Maria	Hajime Mizoguchi
3.	"Thinking About You (Anata no Yoru wo Tsutsumitai)" (Original Karaoke)
4.	"Angel" (Original Karaoke)

Disc 34: True Romance
No.	Title	Lyrics	Music	Arrangement	Length
1.	"True Romance"	Odake	Inoue	Mizoguchi
2.	"Fui no Kiss" ((不意のKiss; "Sudden Kiss"))	Maria	Maria	Mizoguchi
3.	"True Romance" (Original Karaoke)
4.	"Fui no Kiss" (Original Karaoke)

Disc 35: Mirai e no Present
No.	Title	Lyrics	Music	Arrangement	Length
1.	"Mirai e no Present" (Mirai e no Purezento (未来へのプレゼント; "A Present for the Future"))	Mayo Okamoto; Nakayama	Okamoto	Tomoji Sogawa
2.	"Darlin'"	Nakayama	Chika Ueda	Etsuko Yamakawa
3.	"Mirai e no Present" (Original Karaoke)
4.	"Darlin'" (Original Karaoke)

Disc 36: March Color
No.	Title	Lyrics	Music	Arrangement	Length
1.	"March Color" (Māchi Karā (マーチカラー))	Nakayama; Masato Odake	Yūko Ōtaki	Yoshinobu Takeshita
2.	"Shining for You"	Nakayama	Chika Ueda	Shinya Naitō
3.	"Shining for You [Remix Version]" (from The Remixes: Miho Nakayama Meets Los Angeles Groove)
4.	"March Color" (Original Karaoke)

Disc 37: Love Clover
No.	Title	Lyrics	Music	Arrangement	Length
1.	"Love Clover"	Takuro; Nakayama	Takuro	Takuro
2.	"Empty Pocket"	Nakayama; Odake	Takuro	Kōichi Korenaga; Mizoguchi
3.	"Love Clover" (Original Karaoke)
4.	"Empty Pocket" (Original Karaoke)

Disc 38: A Place Under the Sun
No.	Title	Lyrics	Music	Arrangement	Length
1.	"A Place Under the Sun"	Nakayama	Inoue	Inoue
2.	"A Place Under the Sun" (Reversion)	Nakayama	Inoue	Inoue
3.	"Noon Moon"	Nakayama	Mr. Moon; Inoue	Inoue
4.	"A Place Under the Sun" (Reversion Instrumental)
5.	"Noon Moon" (Original Karaoke)

Disc 39: Adore
No.	Title	Lyrics	Music	Arrangement	Length
1.	"Adore"	Odake	Shinyo Kanazawa	Yōichi Shimada
2.	"Adore" (For Movie)	Odake	Kanazawa	Shimada
3.	"Sweetest Lover"	Mizuho Kitayama	Cindy	Little Creatures
4.	"Sweetest Lover [Album Version]" (from Angel Hearts)			Ichizō Seo
5.	"Adore" (Original Karaoke)
6.	"Sweetest Lover" (Original Karaoke)

Disc 40: Millennium Collection
No.	Title	Lyrics	Music	Arrangement	Length
1.	"Stardust"	Mitchell Parish	Hoagy Carmichael
2.	"Lagrimas Negras"	Miguel Matamoros	Matamoros
3.	"Kimi ga Iru kara" ((キミがいるから; "Because You Are Here"))	Nakayama	Masato Kamata	Kamata

DVD: The Live Singles
No.	Title	Length
1.	"C"
2.	"Namaiki"
3.	"Iro White Blend"
4.	"Be-Bop High School"
5.	"Waku Waku Sasete"
6.	"Hade!!!"
7.	"Tsuiteru ne Notteru ne"
8.	"50/50"
9.	"Catch Me"
10.	"Mermaid"
11.	"Rosécolor"
12.	"You're My Only Shinin' Star"
13.	"Kore kara no I Love You"
14.	"Aishiterutte Iwanai!"
15.	"Mellow"
16.	"Rosa"
17.	"Midnight Taxi"
18.	"Tōi Machi no Doko ka de..."
19.	"Shiawase ni Naru Tame ni"
20.	"Sekaijū no Dare Yori Kitto"
21.	"Megamitachi no Bōken" (a Cappella Version)
22.	"Cheers for You"
23.	"Tada Nakitaku Naru no"
24.	"Thinking About You (Anata no Yoru wo Tsutsumitai)"
25.	"Hurt to Heart (Itami no Yukue)"
26.	"True Romance"
27.	"Sea Paradise (OL no Hanran)"
28.	"Mirai e no Present"
29.	"Love Clover"

- DVD tracks 1–4 from Virgin Flight '86: Miho Nakayama First Concert
- DVD tracks 5–9 from Catch Me: Miho Nakayama Live '88
- DVD tracks 10–12 from Whuu! Natural Live at Budokan '89
- DVD tracks 13–14 from Miho Nakayama Concert Tour '91: Miho the Future, Miho the Nature
- DVD tracks 15–18 from Live in Mellow: Miho Nakayama Concert Tour '92
- DVD tracks 19–20 from Miho Nakayama Concert Tour '93: On My Mind
- DVD tracks 21–25 from Miho Nakayama Concert Tour '95: F
- DVD tracks 26–27 from Miho Nakayama Concert Tour '96: Sound of Lip
- DVD tracks 28–29 from Miho Nakayama Concert Tour '98: Live O Live

== Charts ==
Chart (2015)	Peak position
Japanese Albums (Oricon)	169
