= Complete Singles Box =

Box set by Miho Nakayama
- Released: March 1, 2006
- Recorded: 1985–2000
- Genres: J-pop; kayōkyoku; dance-pop; teen pop; city pop; pop rock; R&B
- Languages: Japanese; English; Spanish
- Label: King Records

Miho Nakayama chronology
Collection IV (2006)	Complete Singles Box (2006)	Miho Nakayama Perfect Best (2010)

Complete Singles Box is a box set by Japanese entertainer Miho Nakayama. Released through King Records on March 1, 2006, to commemorate Nakayama's 20th anniversary, the box set compiles all of Nakayama's singles, B-sides, and remix albums. Also included is a DVD containing highlights from her Pure White Live '94 concert.

The box set peaked at No. 147 on Oricon's albums chart.

== Track listing ==
Disc 1: Single A-Side Collection I
No.	Title	Lyrics	Music	Arrangement	Length
1.	"C"	Takashi Matsumoto	Kyōhei Tsutsumi	Mitsuo Hagita
2.	"Namaiki" ((生意気; "Saucy"))	Matsumoto	Tsutsumi	Motoki Funayama
3.	"Be-Bop High School"	Matsumoto	Tsutsumi	Hagita
4.	"Iro White Blend" (Iro Howaito Burendo (色・ホワイトブレンド; "Colored White Blend"))	Mariya Takeuchi	Takeuchi	Nobuyuki Shimizu
5.	"Close Up" (Kurōzu Appu (クローズ・アップ))	Matsumoto	Kazuo Zaitsu	Masaaki Ōmura
6.	"Jingi Aishite Moraimasu" ((JINGI・愛してもらいます; "Jingi, I Want You to Love Me"))	Matsumoto	Tetsuya Komuro	Ōmura
7.	"Tsuiteru ne Notteru ne" ((ツイてるね ノッてるね; "It's Awesome, It's Knocking"))	Matsumoto	Tsutsumi	Ōmura; Funayama
8.	"Waku Waku Sasete" ((WAKU WAKUさせて; "Excite Me More"))	Matsumoto	Tsutsumi	Funayama
9.	"Hade!!!" ((「派手!!!」; "Flashy!!!"))	Matsumoto	Tsutsumi	Funayama
10.	"50/50"	Shun Taguchi	Komuro	Funayama
11.	"Catch Me"	Toshiki Kadomatsu	Kadomatsu	Kadomatsu

Disc 2: Single B-Side Collection I
No.	Title	Lyrics	Music	Arrangement	Length
1.	"Speed Way" (Supīdo Uei (スピード・ウェイ))	Matsumoto	Tsutsumi	Tetsuji Hayashi
2.	"U"	Yūho Iwasato	Miho Iwasato	Hagita
3.	"Hōkago" ((放課後; "After School"))	Matsumoto	Tsutsumi	Hiroshi Shinkawa
4.	"Tokimeki no Season" (Tokimeki no Shīzun (ときめきの季節（シーズン）; "Crush Season"))	Takeuchi	Takeuchi	Shimizu
5.	"Hitomi no Kageri" ((瞳のかげり; "Shadow of the Eyes"))	Matsumoto	Zaitsu	Tatsumi Yano
6.	"Rising Love"	Kadomatsu	Kadomatsu	Kadomatsu
7.	"Nakanai wa" ((放課後; "I Won't Cry"))	Matsumoto	Tsutsumi	Ōmura
8.	"Heart no Switch wo Oshite" (Hāto no Suitchi wo Oshite (ハートのスイッチを押して; "Press the Heart Switch"))	Matsumoto	Tsutsumi	Funayama
9.	"Jealousy" (Jerashī (ジェラシー))	Matsumoto	Tsutsumi	Funayama
10.	"Nanamena Ai wo Yurushite" ((斜めな愛を許して; "Forgive the Diagonal Love"))	Mami Ayukawa	Ayukawa	Shirō Sagisu
11.	"Bad Boy"	Shun Taguchi	HALNEN	Sagisu

Disc 3: Single A-Side Collection II
No.	Title	Lyrics	Music	Arrangement	Length
1.	"You're My Only Shinin' Star"	Kadomatsu	Kadomatsu	Kadomatsu; Kazuo Ōtani (strings); Shin Kazuhara (brass)
2.	"Mermaid" (Māmeido (人魚姫 mermaid))	Chinfa Kan	Cindy	Rod Antoon
3.	"Witches" (Uitchizu (Witchesウイッチズ))	Kan	Cindy	Yūji Toriyama
4.	"Rosécolor"	Kan	Cindy	Toriyama
5.	"Virgin Eyes"	Yumi Yoshimoto	Anri	Yasuharu Ogura
6.	"Midnight Taxi"	Ryō Asuka	Asuka	Tomoji Sogawa
7.	"Semi-sweet Magic" (Semisuuīto no Mahō (セミスウィートの魔法))	Gorō Matsui	Cindy	Antoon; Cindy (chorus)
8.	"Megamitachi no Bōken" ((女神たちの冒険; "The Adventures of the Goddesses"))	Matsui	Hideo Saitō	Saitō
9.	"Aishiterutte Iwanai!" ((愛してるっていわない!; "I Don't Love You!"))	Yoshihiko Andō	Hitoshi Haba	Nobuhiko Kashiwara

Disc 4: Single B-Side Collection II
No.	Title	Lyrics	Music	Arrangement	Length
1.	"Sherry"	Kadomatsu	Kadomatsu	Kadomatsu
2.	"In the Morning"	Masumi Kawamura	Toshinobu Kubota	Takao Sugiyama
3.	"Chikai wo Yabutte" ((誓いを破って; "Break the Vow"))	Kan	Cindy	Kunio Muramatsu
4.	"You and I"	Cindy	Greg Moore	Toriyama
5.	"Sanctuary" (Sankuchuari (サンクチュアリ〜Sanctuary〜))	Yoshimoto	Anri	Ogura; Kazuo Ōtani (strings)
6.	"Honki Demo..." ((本気でも…; "Seriously..."))	Asuka	Asuka	Sogawa
7.	"Save Your Love"	Miho Nakayama	Cindy	Toriyama
8.	"Too Fast, Too Close" (Dance Version)	Cindy	Cindy	Toriyama
9.	"Without You"	Mizuho Kitayama	Ōtani	Ōtani

Disc 5: Single A-Side Collection III
No.	Title	Lyrics	Music	Arrangement	Length
1.	"Kore kara no I Love You" ((これからのI Love You; "This Is I Love You"))	Matsui	Kenjirō Sakiya	ATOM; Sakiya (strings)
2.	"Rosa"	Issaque	Yoshimasa Inoue	ATOM
3.	"Tōi Machi no Doko ka de..." ((遠い街のどこかで…; "Somewhere in a Distant City..."))	Mika Watanabe	Hideya Nakazaki	Nakazaki
4.	"Mellow"	Issaque	Inoue	Inoue
5.	"Sekaijū no Dare Yori Kitto (Miho Nakayama & Wands)" ((世界中の誰よりきっと; "Surely More Than Anyone in the World"))	Show Wesugi; Nakayama	Tetsurō Oda	Takeshi Hayama
6.	"Shiawase ni Naru Tame ni" ((幸せになるために; "To Be Happy"))	Yūho Iwasato; Nakayama	Toshifumi Hinata	Hinata
7.	"Anata ni Nara..." ((あなたになら…; "For You..."))	Nakayama	Joe Hisaishi	Hisaishi
8.	"Tada Nakitaku Naru no" ((ただ泣きたくなるの; "I Just Feel Like Crying"))	Yurie Kokubu; Nakayama	Masaki Iwamoto	Iwamoto
9.	"Sea Paradise (OL no Hanran)" ((Sea Paradise -OLの反乱-; "Sea Paradise -An Office Lady's Rebellion-"))	Nakayama	KNACK	ATOM
10.	"Hero"	Mariah Carey; Nakayama	Carey; Walter Afanasieff	Robbie Buchanan

Disc 6: Single B-Side Collection III
No.	Title	Lyrics	Music	Arrangement	Length
1.	"Dara ka ga Ai ni..." ((誰かが愛に…; "Someone Loves..."))	Nakayama	Masaya Ozeki	ATOM
2.	"Dream"	Inoue	Inoue	ATOM
3.	"Tell Me"	Watanabe	Watanabe	Yōichi Yamazaki
4.	"Silent"	Nakayama	Chiho Kiyooka	Yoshio Tsuru
5.	"Sekaijū no Dare Yori Kitto" (Part II)	Wesugi; Nakayama	Oda	Hayama
6.	"P.S. Natsu no Kuni kara" ((P.S. 夏の国から; "P.S. From a Summer Country"))	Yui Nishiwaki	Nishiwaki	Nobuo Ariga
7.	"Holiday"	Mami Takubo	Ozeki	URAN
8.	"Tada Nakitaku Naru no" (Another Edition)	Kokubu; Nakayama	Iwamoto	ATOM+1
9.	"Nando demo Aiseru kara" ((何度でも愛せるから; "I Can Love You Again and Again"))	Nakayama	Nakayama	ATOM
10.	"Hero" (a Cappella Version)	Carey; Nakayama	Carey; Afanasieff	Cindy; Hiroshi Narumi

Disc 7: Single A-Side Collection IV
No.	Title	Lyrics	Music	Arrangement	Length
1.	"Cheers for You"	Masato Odake; Nakayama	Kubota	Camus Celli; Andres Levin
2.	"Hurt to Heart (Itami no Yukue)" ((Hurt to Heart〜痛みの行方〜; "Hurt to Heart ~Whereabouts of Pain"))	Keiko Yokoyama	Yokoyama	Jerry Hey
3.	"Thinking About You (Anata no Yoru wo Tsutsumitai)" ((Thinking About You〜あなたの夜を包みたい〜; "Thinking About You ~I Want to Wrap Your Night~"))	Odake	Maria	Kazuo Ōtani
4.	"True Romance"	Odake	Inoue	Hajime Mizoguchi
5.	"Mirai e no Present (Miho Nakayama with Mayo)" (Mirai e no Purezento (未来へのプレゼント; "A Present for the Future"))	Mayo Okamoto; Nakayama	Okamoto	Tomoji Sogawa
6.	"March Color" (Māchi Karā (マーチカラー))	Nakayama; Odake	Yūko Ōtaki	Shinya Naitō
7.	"Love Clover"	Takuro; Nakayama	Takuro	Takuro
8.	"A Place Under the Sun"	Nakayama	Inoue	Inoue
9.	"Adore"	Odake	Shinyo Kanazawa	Yōichi Shimada
10.	"Stardust [Bonus Track]"	Mitchell Parish	Hoagy Carmichael
11.	"Lagrimas Negras [Bonus Track]"	Miguel Matamoros	Matamoros
12.	"Kimi ga Iru kara [Bonus Track]" ((キミがいるから; "Because You Are Here"))	Nakayama	Masato Kamata	Kamata

Disc 8: Single B-Side Collection IV
No.	Title	Lyrics	Music	Arrangement	Length
1.	"Cheers for You" (Dance Mix)	Odake; Nakayama	Kubota	Celli; Levin; "Bonzai" Jim Caruso (Remix)
2.	"I Love You"	Nakayama	Cindy	Hey
3.	"Angel"	Nakayama; Odake	Maria	Hajime Mizoguchi
4.	"Fui no Kiss" ((不意のKiss; "Sudden Kiss"))	Maria	Maria	Mizoguchi
5.	"Darlin'"	Nakayama	Chika Ueda	Etsuko Yamakawa
6.	"Shining for You"	Nakayama	Ueda	Naitō
7.	"Empty Pocket"	Nakayama; Odake	Takuro	Kōichi Korenaga; Mizoguchi
8.	"A Place Under the Sun" (Reversion)	Nakayama	Inoue	Inoue
9.	"Noon Moon"	Nakayama	Mr. Moon; Inoue	Inoue
10.	"Adore" (For Movie)	Odake	Kanazawa	Shimada
11.	"Sweetest Lover"	Kitayama	Cindy	Little Creatures

Disc 9: Makin' Dancin'/Dance Box
No.	Title	Lyrics	Music	Arrangement	Length
1.	"Funky Mermaid [M.I.D. Dance Mix]"	Kan; Taguchi; Matsumoto	Cindy; Komuro; Zaitsu; Tsutsumi
2.	"Catch Me in Euro [Ultimix Part 1]"	Kadomatsu; Takeuchi; Matsumoto	Kadomatsu; Takeuchi; Tsutsumi
3.	"Dance with C [Ultimix Part 2]"	Matsumoto	Tsutsumi
4.	"From Waku Waku Sasete"	Matsumoto	Tsutsumi	ATOM
5.	"From Rosa"	Issaque	Inoue	ATOM
6.	"From Catch Me"	Kadomatsu	Kadomatsu	ATOM
7.	"From Be-Bop High School"	Matsumoto	Tsutsumi	ATOM
8.	"From Mermaid"	Kan	Cindy	ATOM
9.	"From Cockatoo"	Nakayama	Ozeki	ATOM

Disc 10: The Remixes - New York Groove/Los Angeles Groove
No.	Title	Lyrics	Music	Length
1.	"Angel Soul"	Nakayama	Naitō
2.	"Chīsana Taiyō (Carrot Red)" ((小さな太陽 -CARROT RED; "Little Sun (Carrot Red)"))	Nakayama	Naitō
3.	"The Eternities"	Nakayama	Keisuke Araki
4.	"Shining for You"	Nakayama	Ueda
5.	"You're My Only Shinin' Star"	Kadomatsu	Kadomatsu
6.	"Tōi Machi no Doko ka de..."	Watanabe	Nakazaki
7.	"Love for You"	Nakayama	Cindy
8.	"Sea Paradise (OL no Hanran)"	Nakayama	KNACK
9.	"Blue Stone"	Nakayama	Jeff Pfeifer; Rob Pfeifer
10.	"Fuwaraidō (What I Do)" ((付和雷同 -WHAT↑I↓DO-; "Following Blindly -What I Do-"))	Nakayama	Shigeo Miyata
11.	"I Know"	Rui Serizawa	Cindy
12.	"Treasure"	Nishiwaki	Nishiwaki; Yōko Orihara

Special Live DVD from Pure White Live '94
No.	Title	Lyrics	Music	Length
1.	"Sea Paradise (OL no Hanran)"	Nakayama	KNACK
2.	"Sekaijū no Dare Yori Kitto"	Wesugi; Nakayama	Oda
3.	"Singles Medley" (Shinguru Medorē (シングルメドレー))

== Charts ==
Chart (2006)	Peak position
Japanese Albums (Oricon)	147
