= Miho Nakayama 40th Anniversary: The Best Ten =

Live video album

Video by Miho Nakayama
- Released: March 19, 2025
- Recorded: 1985–1997
- Venue: TBS Studios, Tokyo
- Genre: J-pop; kayōkyoku; dance-pop; city pop; pop rock; R&B
- Language: Japanese
- Label: King Records

Miho Nakayama chronology
| Miho Nakayama Concert Tour 2024: Deux (2024) | Miho Nakayama 40th Anniversary: The Best Ten (2025) |

Miho Nakayama 40th Anniversary: The Best Ten (～Miho Nakayama 40th Anniversary～ 中山美穂「ザ・ベストテン」永久保存版, Nakayama Miho "Za Besuto Ten" Eikyū Hozon-ban; lit. Miho Nakayama: The Best Ten Eternal Edition) is a video box set by Japanese entertainer Miho Nakayama. Released exclusively on Blu-ray through King Records on March 19, 2025, the box set compiles all of Nakayama's appearances on TBS' music show The Best Ten. It is Nakayama's first posthumous release, following her death on December 6, 2024.

The video peaked at No. 4 on Oricon's Blu-ray chart.

== Track listing ==
Disc 1: TBS Singles History + Bonus Tracks
| No. | Title | Lyrics | Music | Length |
|---|---|---|---|---|
| 1. | "C" | Takashi Matsumoto | Kyōhei Tsutsumi |
| 2. | "Be-Bop High School" | Matsumoto | Tsutsumi |
| 3. | "Iro White Blend" (Iro Howaito Burendo (色・ホワイトブレンド; "Colored White Blend")) | Mariya Takeuchi | Takeuchi |
| 4. | "Close Up" (Kurōzu Appu (クローズ・アップ)) | Matsumoto | Kazuo Zaitsu |
| 5. | "Jingi Aishite Moraimasu" ((JINGI・愛してもらいます; "Jingi, I Want You to Love Me")) | Matsumoto | Tetsuya Komuro |
| 6. | "Tsuiteru ne Notteru ne" ((ツイてるね ノッてるね; "It's Awesome, It's Knocking")) | Matsumoto | Tsutsumi |
| 7. | "Waku Waku Sasete" ((WAKU WAKUさせて; "Excite Me More")) | Matsumoto | Tsutsumi |
| 8. | "Hade!!!" ((「派手!!!」; "Flashy!!!")) | Matsumoto | Tsutsumi |
| 9. | "50/50" | Shun Taguchi | Komuro |
| 10. | "Catch Me" | Toshiki Kadomatsu | Kadomatsu |
| 11. | "You're My Only Shinin' Star" | Kadomatsu | Kadomatsu |
| 12. | "Mermaid" (Māmeido (人魚姫 mermaid)) | Chinfa Kan | Cindy |
| 13. | "Witches" | Kan | Cindy |
| 14. | "Rosécolor" | Kan | Cindy |
| 15. | "Virgin Eyes" | Yumi Yoshimoto | Anri |
| 16. | "Rosa" | Issaque | Yoshimasa Inoue |
| 17. | "Tōi Machi no Doko ka de..." ((遠い街のどこかで…; "Somewhere in a Distant City...")) | Mika Watanabe | Hideya Nakazaki |
| 18. | "Megamitachi no Bōken" ((女神たちの冒険; "The Adventures of the Goddesses")) | Gorō Matsui | Hideo Saitō |
| 19. | "Kore kara no I Love You" ((これからのI Love You; "This Is I Love You")) | Matsui | Kenjirō Sakiya |
| 20. | "Mellow" | Issaque | Yoshimasa Inoue |
| 21. | "Sekaijū no Dare Yori Kitto" ((世界中の誰よりきっと; "Surely More Than Anyone in the World")) | Show Wesugi; Nakayama | Tetsurō Oda |
| 22. | "Mirai e no Present" (Mirai e no Purezento (未来へのプレゼント; "A Present for the Future")) | Mayo Okamoto; Nakayama | Okamoto |
| 23. | "March Color" (Māchi Karā (マーチカラー)) | Nakayama; Masato Odake | Yūko Ōtaki |
| 24. | "Candies Medley" (Kyandīzu Medorē (キャンディーズメドレー)) |
| 25. | "My Baby Santa Claus" (Koibito ga Santa Kurōsu (恋人がサンタクロース)) | Yumi Matsutoya | Matsutoya |
| 26. | "Heart no Switch wo Oshite" (Hāto no Suitchi wo Oshite (ハートのスイッチを押して; "Press the Heart Switch")) | Matsumoto | Tsutsumi |
| 27. | "Sekaijū no Dare Yori Kitto" | Wesugi; Nakayama | Oda |
| 28. | "Mirai e no Present" | Okamoto; Nakayama | Okamoto |
| 29. | "March Color" | Nakayama; Odake | Ōtaki |

Disc 2: "C" – "Jingi Aishite Moraimasu"
| No. | Title | Lyrics | Music | Length |
|---|---|---|---|---|
| 1. | "C" | Matsumoto | Tsutsumi |
| 2. | "C" | Matsumoto | Tsutsumi |
| 3. | "C" | Matsumoto | Tsutsumi |
| 4. | "C" | Matsumoto | Tsutsumi |
| 5. | "C" | Matsumoto | Tsutsumi |
| 6. | "Be-Bop High School" | Matsumoto | Tsutsumi |
| 7. | "Be-Bop High School" | Matsumoto | Tsutsumi |
| 8. | "Be-Bop High School" | Matsumoto | Tsutsumi |
| 9. | "Be-Bop High School" | Matsumoto | Tsutsumi |
| 10. | "Be-Bop High School" | Matsumoto | Tsutsumi |
| 11. | "Be-Bop High School" | Matsumoto | Tsutsumi |
| 12. | "Be-Bop High School" | Matsumoto | Tsutsumi |
| 13. | "Be-Bop High School" | Matsumoto | Tsutsumi |
| 14. | "Iro White Blend" | Takeuchi | Takeuchi |
| 15. | "Iro White Blend" | Takeuchi | Takeuchi |
| 16. | "Iro White Blend" | Takeuchi | Takeuchi |
| 17. | "Iro White Blend" | Takeuchi | Takeuchi |
| 18. | "Iro White Blend" | Takeuchi | Takeuchi |
| 19. | "Iro White Blend" | Takeuchi | Takeuchi |
| 20. | "Iro White Blend" | Takeuchi | Takeuchi |
| 21. | "Iro White Blend" | Takeuchi | Takeuchi |
| 22. | "Close Up" | Matsumoto | Zaitsu |
| 23. | "Close Up" | Matsumoto | Zaitsu |
| 24. | "Close Up" | Matsumoto | Zaitsu |
| 25. | "Close Up" | Matsumoto | Zaitsu |
| 26. | "Jingi Aishite Moraimasu" | Matsumoto | Komuro |
| 27. | "Jingi Aishite Moraimasu" | Matsumoto | Komuro |
| 28. | "Jingi Aishite Moraimasu" | Matsumoto | Komuro |

Disc 3: "Tsuiteru ne Notteru ne" – "Hade!!!"
| No. | Title | Lyrics | Music | Length |
|---|---|---|---|---|
| 1. | "Tsuiteru ne Notteru ne" | Matsumoto | Tsutsumi |
| 2. | "Tsuiteru ne Notteru ne" | Matsumoto | Tsutsumi |
| 3. | "Tsuiteru ne Notteru ne" | Matsumoto | Tsutsumi |
| 4. | "Tsuiteru ne Notteru ne" | Matsumoto | Tsutsumi |
| 5. | "Tsuiteru ne Notteru ne" | Matsumoto | Tsutsumi |
| 6. | "Tsuiteru ne Notteru ne" | Matsumoto | Tsutsumi |
| 7. | "Tsuiteru ne Notteru ne" | Matsumoto | Tsutsumi |
| 8. | "Tsuiteru ne Notteru ne" | Matsumoto | Tsutsumi |
| 9. | "Tsuiteru ne Notteru ne" | Matsumoto | Tsutsumi |
| 10. | "Tsuiteru ne Notteru ne" | Matsumoto | Tsutsumi |
| 11. | "Tsuiteru ne Notteru ne" | Matsumoto | Tsutsumi |
| 12. | "Waku Waku Sasete" | Matsumoto | Tsutsumi |
| 13. | "Waku Waku Sasete" | Matsumoto | Tsutsumi |
| 14. | "Waku Waku Sasete" | Matsumoto | Tsutsumi |
| 15. | "Waku Waku Sasete" | Matsumoto | Tsutsumi |
| 16. | "Waku Waku Sasete" | Matsumoto | Tsutsumi |
| 17. | "Waku Waku Sasete" | Matsumoto | Tsutsumi |
| 18. | "Waku Waku Sasete" | Matsumoto | Tsutsumi |
| 19. | "Waku Waku Sasete" | Matsumoto | Tsutsumi |
| 20. | "Hade!!!" | Matsumoto | Tsutsumi |
| 21. | "Hade!!!" | Matsumoto | Tsutsumi |
| 22. | "Hade!!!" | Matsumoto | Tsutsumi |
| 23. | "Hade!!!" | Matsumoto | Tsutsumi |
| 24. | "Hade!!!" | Matsumoto | Tsutsumi |

Disc 4: "50/50" – "You're My Only Shining Star"
| No. | Title | Lyrics | Music | Length |
|---|---|---|---|---|
| 1. | "50/50" | Taguchi | Komuro |
| 2. | "50/50" | Taguchi | Komuro |
| 3. | "50/50" | Taguchi | Komuro |
| 4. | "50/50" | Taguchi | Komuro |
| 5. | "50/50" | Taguchi | Komuro |
| 6. | "50/50" | Taguchi | Komuro |
| 7. | "50/50" | Taguchi | Komuro |
| 8. | "50/50" | Taguchi | Komuro |
| 9. | "50/50" | Taguchi | Komuro |
| 10. | "50/50" | Taguchi | Komuro |
| 11. | "50/50" | Taguchi | Komuro |
| 12. | "50/50" | Taguchi | Komuro |
| 13. | "Catch Me" | Kadomatsu | Kadomatsu |
| 14. | "Catch Me" | Kadomatsu | Kadomatsu |
| 15. | "You're My Only Shinin' Star" | Kadomatsu | Kadomatsu |
| 16. | "You're My Only Shinin' Star" | Kadomatsu | Kadomatsu |
| 17. | "You're My Only Shinin' Star" | Kadomatsu | Kadomatsu |
| 18. | "You're My Only Shinin' Star" | Kadomatsu | Kadomatsu |
| 19. | "You're My Only Shinin' Star" | Kadomatsu | Kadomatsu |
| 20. | "You're My Only Shinin' Star" | Kadomatsu | Kadomatsu |
| 21. | "You're My Only Shinin' Star" | Kadomatsu | Kadomatsu |
| 22. | "You're My Only Shinin' Star" | Kadomatsu | Kadomatsu |
| 23. | "You're My Only Shinin' Star" | Kadomatsu | Kadomatsu |
| 24. | "You're My Only Shinin' Star" | Kadomatsu | Kadomatsu |

Disc 4: "Mermaid" – "Virgin Eyes"
| No. | Title | Lyrics | Music | Length |
|---|---|---|---|---|
| 1. | "Mermaid" | Kan | Cindy |
| 2. | "Mermaid" | Kan | Cindy |
| 3. | "Mermaid" | Kan | Cindy |
| 4. | "Mermaid" | Kan | Cindy |
| 5. | "Mermaid" | Kan | Cindy |
| 6. | "Mermaid" | Kan | Cindy |
| 7. | "Mermaid" | Kan | Cindy |
| 8. | "Mermaid" | Kan | Cindy |
| 9. | "Mermaid" | Kan | Cindy |
| 10. | "Mermaid" | Kan | Cindy |
| 11. | "Witches" | Kan | Cindy |
| 12. | "Witches" | Kan | Cindy |
| 13. | "Witches" | Kan | Cindy |
| 14. | "Witches" | Kan | Cindy |
| 15. | "Witches" | Kan | Cindy |
| 16. | "Witches" | Kan | Cindy |
| 17. | "Rosécolor" | Kan | Cindy |
| 18. | "Rosécolor" | Kan | Cindy |
| 19. | "Rosécolor" | Kan | Cindy |
| 20. | "Rosécolor" | Kan | Cindy |
| 21. | "Rosécolor" | Kan | Cindy |
| 22. | "Virgin Eyes" | Yoshimoto | Anri |
| 23. | "Virgin Eyes" | Yoshimoto | Anri |
| 24. | "Virgin Eyes" | Yoshimoto | Anri |
| 25. | "Virgin Eyes" | Yoshimoto | Anri |
| 26. | "Virgin Eyes" | Yoshimoto | Anri |
| 27. | "Virgin Eyes" | Yoshimoto | Anri |
| 28. | "Virgin Eyes" | Yoshimoto | Anri |
| 29. | "Virgin Eyes" | Yoshimoto | Anri |

- Disc 1 uses select footage from discs 2–5.

== Charts ==
| Chart (2025) | Peak position |
|---|---|
| Japanese Blu-ray (Oricon) | 4 |
