= Perfect Best (Miho Nakayama album) =

Miho Nakayama Perfect Best

Compilation album by Miho Nakayama
- Released: July 7, 2010
- Recorded: 1985–1996
- Genre: J-pop; kayōkyoku; dance-pop; teen pop; city pop; pop rock; R&B
- Length: 2:33:58
- Language: Japanese
- Label: King Records

Miho Nakayama chronology
Complete Singles Box (2006)	Miho Nakayama Perfect Best (2010)	Miho Nakayama Perfect Best 2 (2013)

Miho Nakayama Perfect Best (中山美穂 パーフェクト・ベスト, Nakayama Miho Pāfekuto Besuto) is the 15th compilation album by Japanese entertainer Miho Nakayama. Released through King Records on July 7, 2010 to commemorate Nakayama's 25th anniversary, the album compiles 34 of her singles from 1985 to 1996.

The album peaked at No. 105 on Oricon's albums chart.

== Track listing ==
Disc 1
No.	Title	Lyrics	Music	Arrangement	Length
1.	"C"	Takashi Matsumoto	Kyōhei Tsutsumi	Mitsuo Hagita	3:29
2.	"Namaiki" ((生意気; "Saucy"))	Matsumoto	Tsutsumi	Motoki Funayama	3:20
3.	"Be-Bop High School"	Matsumoto	Tsutsumi	Hagita	3:51
4.	"Iro White Blend" (Iro Howaito Burendo (色・ホワイトブレンド; "Colored White Blend"))	Mariya Takeuchi	Takeuchi	Nobuyuki Shimizu	4:14
5.	"Close Up" (Kurōzu Appu (クローズ・アップ))	Matsumoto	Kazuo Zaitsu	Masaaki Ōmura	4:00
6.	"Jingi Aishite Moraimasu" ((JINGI・愛してもらいます; "Jingi, I Want You to Love Me"))	Matsumoto	Tetsuya Komuro	Ōmura	3:50
7.	"Tsuiteru ne Notteru ne" ((ツイてるね ノッてるね; "It's Crazy, It's Knocking"))	Matsumoto	Tsutsumi	Ōmura; Funayama	3:43
8.	"Waku Waku Sasete" ((WAKU WAKUさせて; "Excite Me More"))	Matsumoto	Tsutsumi	Funayama	3:58
9.	"Hade!!!" ((「派手!!!」; "Flashy!!!"))	Matsumoto	Tsutsumi	Funayama	4:01
10.	"50/50"	Shun Taguchi	Komuro	Funayama	3:42
11.	"Catch Me"	Toshiki Kadomatsu	Kadomatsu	Kadomatsu	4:12
12.	"You're My Only Shinin' Star"	Kadomatsu	Kadomatsu	Kadomatsu; Kazuo Ōtani (strings); Shin Kazuhara (brass)	4:39
13.	"Mermaid" (Māmeido (人魚姫 mermaid))	Chinfa Kan	Cindy	Rod Antoon	4:06
14.	"Witches" (Uitchizu (Witchesウイッチズ))	Kan	Cindy	Yūji Toriyama	3:52
15.	"Rosécolor"	Kan	Cindy	Toriyama	5:00
16.	"Virgin Eyes"	Yumi Yoshimoto	Anri	Yasuharu Ogura	4:08
17.	"Midnight Taxi"	Ryō Asuka	Asuka	Tomoji Sogawa	4:49
18.	"Semi-sweet Magic" (Semisuuīto no Mahō (セミスウィートの魔法))	Gorō Matsui	Cindy	Antoon; Cindy (chorus)	4:57
19.	"Megamitachi no Bōken" ((女神たちの冒険; "The Adventures of the Goddesses"))	Matsui	Hideo Saitō	Saitō	4:06

Disc 2
No.	Title	Lyrics	Music	Arrangement	Length
1.	"Aishiterutte Iwanai!" ((愛してるっていわない!; "I Don't Love You!"))	Yoshihiko Andō	Hitoshi Haba	Nobuhiko Kashiwara	3:45
2.	"Kore kara no I Love You" ((これからのI Love You; "This Is I Love You"))	Matsui	Kenjirō Sakiya	ATOM; Sakiya (strings)	5:57
3.	"Rosa"	Issaque	Yoshimasa Inoue	ATOM	5:13
4.	"Tōi Machi no Doko ka de..." ((遠い街のどこかで…; "Somewhere in a Distant City..."))	Mika Watanabe	Hideya Nakazaki	Nakazaki	5:57
5.	"Mellow"	Issaque	Inoue	Inoue	5:52
6.	"Sekaijū no Dare Yori Kitto (Miho Nakayama & Wands)" ((世界中の誰よりきっと; "Surely More Than Anyone in the World"))	Show Wesugi; Nakayama	Tetsurō Oda	Takeshi Hayama	4:07
7.	"Shiawase ni Naru Tame ni" ((幸せになるために; "To Be Happy"))	Yūho Iwasato; Nakayama	Toshifumi Hinata	Hinata	4:16
8.	"Anata ni Nara..." ((あなたになら…; "For You..."))	Nakayama	Joe Hisaishi	Hisaishi	5:26
9.	"Tada Nakitaku Naru no" ((ただ泣きたくなるの; "I Just Feel Like Crying"))	Yurie Kokubu; Nakayama	Masaki Iwamoto	Iwamoto	5:02
10.	"Sea Paradise (OL no Hanran)" ((Sea Paradise -OLの反乱-; "Sea Paradise -An Office Lady's Rebellion-"))	Nakayama	KNACK	ATOM	6:17
11.	"Hero"	Mariah Carey; Nakayama	Carey; Walter Afanasieff	Robbie Buchanan	4:53
12.	"Cheers for You"	Masato Odake; Nakayama	Toshinobu Kubota	Camus Celli; Andres Levin	4:46
13.	"Hurt to Heart (Itami no Yukue)" ((Hurt to Heart〜痛みの行方〜; "Hurt to Heart ~Whereabouts of Pain"))	Keiko Yokoyama	Yokoyama	Jerry Hey	5:13
14.	"Thinking About You (Anata no Yoru wo Tsutsumitai)" ((Thinking About You〜あなたの夜を包みたい〜; "Thinking About You ~I Want to Wrap Your Night~"))	Masato Odake	Maria	Kazuo Ōtani	4:52
15.	"Mirai e no Present (Miho Nakayama with Mayo)" (Mirai e no Purezento (未来へのプレゼント; "A Present for the Future"))	Mayo Okamoto; Nakayama	Okamoto	Tomoji Sogawa	4:26

== Charts ==
Chart (2010)	Peak position
Japanese Albums (Oricon)	105
