= Makin' Dancin' =

Remix album by Miho Nakayama
- Released: October 21, 1988
- Recorded: 1988
- Genre: J-pop; dance-pop
- Length: 13:09
- Language: Japanese
- Label: King Records
- Producer: Akira Fukuzumi

Miho Nakayama chronology
| Mind Game (1988) | Makin' Dancin' (1988) | Angel Hearts (1988) |

Makin' Dancin' (メイキン・ダンシン, Meikin Danshin) is the first remix album by Japanese entertainer Miho Nakayama. Released through King Records on October 21, 1988, the album includes three tracks that feature a medley of Nakayama's hit songs.

The album peaked at No. 2 on Oricon's albums chart and sold over 183,000 copies.

== Track listing ==
All lyrics are written by Takashi Matsumoto, except where indicated; all music is composed by Kyōhei Tsutsumi, except where indicated.

1. Funky Mermaid [M.I.D. Dance Mix]
| No. | Title | Lyrics | Music | Length |
|---|---|---|---|---|
| 1. | "Mermaid" (Māmeido (人魚姫 mermaid)) | Chinfa Kan | Cindy |
| 2. | "50/50" | Shun Taguchi | Tetsuya Komuro |
| 3. | "Close Up" (Kurōzu Appu (クローズ・アップ)) | | Kazuo Zaitsu |
| 4. | "Namaiki" ((生意気; "Saucy")) |
| 5. | "Jingi Aishite Moraimasu" ((JINGI・愛してもらいます; "Jingi, I Want You to Love Me")) | | Komuro |
| Total length: | | | | 6:43 |

2. Catch Me in Euro [Ultimix Part 1]
| No. | Title | Lyrics | Music | Length |
|---|---|---|---|---|
| 1. | "Catch Me" | Toshiki Kadomatsu | Kadomatsu |
| 2. | "Iro White Blend" (Iro Howaito Burendo (色・ホワイトブレンド; "Colored White Blend")) | Mariya Takeuchi | Takeuchi |
| 3. | "Waku Waku Sasete" ((WAKU WAKUさせて; "Excite Me More")) |
| 4. | "Be-Bop High School" |
| Total length: | | | | 3:50 |

3. Dance with C [Ultimix Part 2]
| No. | Title | Length |
|---|---|---|
| 1. | "C" |
| 2. | "Tsuiteru ne Notteru ne" ((ツイてるね ノッてるね; "It's Crazy, It's Knocking")) |
| 3. | "Hade!!!" ((「派手!!!」; "Flashy!!!")) |
| Total length: | | 2:36 |

== Credits ==
- Master mix by Masahiko "Monchi" Tanaka
- Edited by Masaaki Tamura
- Management: Norio Hashimoto (M.I.D.)

== Charts ==
| Chart (1988) | Peak position |
|---|---|
| Japanese Albums (Oricon) | 2 |

== See also ==
- 1988 in Japanese music
