= Collection (Miho Nakayama album) =

Compilation album by Miho Nakayama
- Released: November 15, 1987
- Recorded: 1985–1987
- Genres: J-pop; kayōkyoku; dance-pop; teen pop
- Length: 42:27
- Language: Japanese
- Label: King Records

Miho Nakayama chronology
| One and Only (1987) | Collection (1987) | Catch the Nite (1988) |

Singles from Collection
- 1. "Be-Bop High School" Released: December 5, 1985; 2. "Iro White Blend" Released: February 5, 1986; 3. "Jingi Aishite Moraimasu" Released: July 15, 1986; 4. "Tsuiteru ne Notteru ne" Released: August 21, 1986; 5. "Hade!!!" Released: March 18, 1987; 6. "50/50" Released: July 7, 1987

Collection (コレクション, Korekushon) is the first compilation album by Japanese entertainer Miho Nakayama. Released through King Records on November 15, 1987, the album compiles Nakayama's singles from 1985 to 1987. "C" and "Tsuiteru ne Notteru ne" were the album versions on initial releases of this album; they were replaced with single versions on the 2006 reissue.

The album became Nakayama's first to hit No. 1 on Oricon's albums chart. It sold over 542,000 copies, becoming her biggest selling album until Collection III in 1995.

== Track listing ==
All lyrics are written by Takashi Matsumoto, except where indicated; all music is composed by Kyōhei Tsutsumi, except where indicated.

Side A
| No. | Title | Lyrics | Music | Arrangement | Length |
|---|---|---|---|---|---|
| 1. | "C" | | | Mitsuo Hagita | 3:29 |
| 2. | "Namaiki" ((生意気; "Saucy")) | | | Motoki Funayama | 3:20 |
| 3. | "Be-Bop High School" | | | Hagita | 3:52 |
| 4. | "Iro White Blend" (Iro Howaito Burendo (色・ホワイトブレンド; "Colored White Blend")) | Mariya Takeuchi | Takeuchi | Nobuyuki Shimizu | 4:14 |
| 5. | "Close Up" (Kurōzu Appu (クローズ・アップ)) | | Kazuo Zaitsu | Masaaki Ōmura | 4:00 |
| 6. | "Jingi Aishite Moraimasu" ((JINGI・愛してもらいます; "Jingi, I Want You to Love Me")) | | Tetsuya Komuro | Ōmura | 3:51 |
| Total length: | | | | | 22:46 |

Side B
| No. | Title | Lyrics | Music | Arrangement | Length |
|---|---|---|---|---|---|
| 1. | "Tsuiteru ne Notteru ne" ((ツイてるね ノッてるね; "It's Crazy, It's Knocking")) | | | Ōmura; Funayama | 3:44 |
| 2. | "Waku Waku Sasete" ((WAKU WAKUさせて; "Excite Me More")) | | | Funayama | 3:59 |
| 3. | "Hade!!!" ((「派手!!!」; "Flashy!!!")) | | | Funayama | 4:02 |
| 4. | "50/50" | Shun Taguchi | Komuro | Funayama | 3:43 |
| 5. | "Catch Me" | Toshiki Kadomatsu | Kadomatsu | Kadomatsu | 4:12 |
| Total length: | | | | | 19:39 |

== Charts ==
Weekly charts

| Chart (1987) | Peak position |
|---|---|
| Japanese Albums (Oricon) | 1 |

Year-end charts

| Chart (1987) | Peak position |
|---|---|
| Japanese Albums (Oricon) | 27 |

== See also ==
- 1987 in Japanese music
