= Groovin' Blue =

Groovin' Blue may refer to:

- Groovin' Blue (Curtis Amy & Frank Butler album), 1961
- Groovin' Blue (Miho Nakayama album), 1997
