= Exotique (album) =

Studio album by Miho Nakayama
- Released: December 18, 1986
- Recorded: 1986
- Studio: Free Port Studio; Hitokuchizaka Studio; Marine Studio; Nichion Studio; Sound Valley Studio
- Genre: J-pop; kayōkyoku; dance-pop; teen pop
- Length: 44:06
- Language: Japanese
- Label: King Records
- Producer: Norio Higuchi; Kiyokazu Takahashi

Miho Nakayama chronology
Virgin Flight '86: Miho Nakayama First Concert (1986)	Exotique (1986)	One and Only (1987)

Singles from Exotique
- 1. "Waku Waku Sasete" Released: November 21, 1986

Exotique (エキゾチック, Ekizotikku) is the fourth studio album by Japanese entertainer Miho Nakayama. Released through King Records on December 18, 1986, the album features the single "Waku Waku Sasete". It is a concept album themed around exotic world travel. The songs in Exotique were solely written by Takashi Matsumoto and Kyōhei Tsutsumi and arranged by Motoki Funayama.

The album peaked at No. 6 on Oricon's albums chart and sold over 206,000 copies.

== Track listing ==
All lyrics are written by Takashi Matsumoto; all music is composed by Kyōhei Tsutsumi; all music is arranged by Motoki Funayama.

Side A
No.	Title	Length
1.	"Honō no Mai" ((炎の舞; "Flame Dance"))	4:28
2.	"Peninsula Morning" (Peninshura Mōningu (ペニンシュラ・モーニング))	4:10
3.	"Ogon Kaigan" ((黄金海岸; "Gold Coast"))	5:03
4.	"Kiri no Cape Cod" (霧のケープコッド (Kiri no Kēpu Koddo, "The Fog of Cape Cod"))	4:46
5.	"Waku Waku Sasete" ((WAKU WAKUさせて; "Excite Me More"))	3:57
Total length:		22:24

Side B
No.	Title	Length
1.	"Sweden no Shiro" (Suuēden no Shiro (スウェーデンの城; "Swedish Castle"))	3:50
2.	"Inca no Hihō" (Inka no Hihō (インカの秘宝; "Incan Treasure"))	4:14
3.	"Atsui Yoru" ((熱い夜; "Hot Nights"))	4:54
4.	"Switch On (Heart no Switch wo Oshite)" (SWITCH ON (ハートのスイッチを押して) (Hāto no Suitchi wo Oshite, "Switch On (Press the Heart Switch)"))	3:52
5.	"Toki no Nagare no Yō ni" ((時の流れのように; "Like the Passage of Time"))	4:52
Total length:		21:42

== Charts ==
Weekly charts

Chart (1986)	Peak position
Japanese Albums (Oricon)	6

Year-end charts

Chart (1987)	Peak position
Japanese Albums (Oricon)	45

== See also ==
- 1986 in Japanese music
