= C (Miho Nakayama album) =

Studio album by Miho Nakayama
- Released: August 21, 1985
- Recorded: 1985
- Studio: Sound City Studios
- Genres: J-pop; kayōkyoku; dance-pop; teen pop
- Length: 38:20
- Language: Japanese
- Label: King Records
- Producer: Norio Higuchi

Miho Nakayama chronology
C (1985)	After School (1985)

Singles from C
- 1. "C" Released: June 21, 1985

C (stylized as 「C」) is the debut studio album by Japanese entertainer Miho Nakayama. Released through King Records on August 21, 1985, the album features Nakayama's debut single "C".

The album peaked at No. 11 on Oricon's albums chart and sold over 90,000 copies.

== Track listing ==
Side A
No.	Title	Lyrics	Music	Arrangement	Length
1.	"Tokimeki" ((ときめき; "Crush"))	Yuho Iwasato	Miho Iwasato	Jun Irie	4:00
2.	"Speed Way [Album Version]" (Supīdo Uei (スピード・ウェイ))	Takashi Matsumoto	Tetsuji Hayashi	Mitsuo Hagita	3:17
3.	"Sentimental Tsūshin" (Senchimentaru Tsūshin (センチメンタル通信; "Sentimental Communication"))	Mebae Miyahara	Hagita	Shirō Sagisu	4:08
4.	"See Through Love"	Kumiko Aoki	Hayashi	Hagita	3:25
5.	"C"	Matsumoto	Kyōhei Tsutsumi	Hagita	3:25
Total length:					18:31

Side B
No.	Title	Lyrics	Music	Arrangement	Length
1.	"Umi wo Kanjiru Toki" ((海を感じる瞬間; "The Moment You Feel the Sea"))	Miyahara	Hagita	Sagisu	4:08
2.	"Aitsu" ((あいつ; "That Person"))	Y. Iwasato	Takayuki Baba	Irie	3:49
3.	"Lonely Birthday" (Ronrī Bāsudei (ロンリー・バースデイ))	Miyahara	Kazuya Amikura	Irie	3:56
4.	"Last Drive"	Y. Iwasato	M. Iwasato	Irie	3:57
5.	"Glass no Ame" (Garasu no Ame (ガラスの雨; "Glass Rain"))	Miyahara	Baba	Irie	4:15
Total length:					20:07

== Charts ==
Chart (1985)	Peak position
Japanese Albums (Oricon)	11

== See also ==
- 1985 in Japanese music
