= After School (album) =

Studio album by Miho Nakayama
- Released: December 18, 1985
- Recorded: 1985
- Studio: Sound City Studios
- Genres: J-pop; kayōkyoku; dance-pop; teen pop
- Length: 37:14
- Language: Japanese
- Label: King Records
- Producer: Norio Higuchi

Miho Nakayama chronology
C (1985)	After School (1985)	Summer Breeze (1986)

Singles from After School
- 1. "Namaiki" Released: October 1, 1985

After School (アフター・スクール, Afutā Sukūru) is the second studio album by Japanese entertainer Miho Nakayama. Released through King Records on December 18, 1985, the album features the single "Namaiki".

The album peaked at No. 13 on Oricon's albums chart and sold over 95,000 copies.

== Track listing ==
Side A
No.	Title	Lyrics	Music	Arrangement	Length
1.	"Starlight Vacation"	Yuriko Mori	Mitsuo Hagita	Kazuo Ōtani	4:20
2.	"Namaiki" ((生意気; "Saucy"))	Takashi Matsumoto	Kyōhei Tsutsumi	Motoki Funayama	3:21
3.	"Kenka Tomodachi" ((けんか友達; "A Conflicted Friend"))	Chiroru Yaho	Ichinen Miura	Ōtani	4:07
4.	"Hōkago" (放課後 ("After School"))	Matsumoto	Tsutsumi	Hiroshi Shinkawa	3:23
5.	"Aoi Zameta Pendant" (蒼ざめたペンダント (Aoi Zameta Pendanto, "Pale Blue Pendant"))	Yoshiko Miura	Takayuki Baba	Hagita	4:07
Total length:					19:17

Side B
No.	Title	Lyrics	Music	Arrangement	Length
1.	"A-so-bi" ((あ・そ・び; "P-l-a-y"))	Yuho Iwasato	I. Miura	Ōtani	4:16
2.	"Heart Break"	Y. Miura	Baba	Jun Irie	3:28
3.	"U"	Y. Iwasato	Miho Iwasato	Hagita	3:22
4.	"Street Fantasy" (ストリート・ファンタジー (Sutorīto Fantajī))	Y. Miura	Baba	Irie	3:41
5.	"Shiroi Hagaki" ((白いはがき; "White Postcard"))	Hiroko Hosoda	Frankie T.	Ōtani	3:09
Total length:					17:55

== Charts ==
Chart (1985)	Peak position
Japanese Albums (Oricon)	13

== See also ==
- 1985 in Japanese music
