= The Remixes: Miho Nakayama Meets New York Groove =

Remix album by Miho Nakayama
- Released: December 3, 1997
- Recorded: 1997
- Genre: J-pop; pop rock
- Length: 31:10
- Language: Japanese
- Label: King Records

Miho Nakayama chronology
Groovin' Blue (1997)	The Remixes: Miho Nakayama Meets New York Groove (1997)	The Remixes: Miho Nakayama Meets Los Angeles Groove (1998)

The Remixes: Miho Nakayama Meets New York Groove is the third remix album by Japanese entertainer Miho Nakayama. Released through King Records on December 3, 1997, the album features six remixed songs; four of which are from her album Groovin' Blue.

The album peaked at No. 57 on Oricon's albums chart and sold over 5,000 copies.

== Track listing ==
All lyrics are written by Miho Nakayama, except where indicated.

No.	Title	Lyrics	Music	Length
1.	"Angel Soul"		Shinya Naitō	5:40
2.	"Chīsana Taiyō (Carrot Red)" ((小さな太陽 -CARROT RED; "Little Sun (Carrot Red)"))		Naitō	4:31
3.	"The Eternities"		Keisuke Araki	6:03
4.	"Shining for You"		Chika Ueda	4:13
5.	"You're My Only Shinin' Star"	Toshiki Kadomatsu	Kadomatsu	4:31
6.	"Tōi Machi no Doko ka de..." ((遠い街のどこかで…; "Somewhere in a Distant City..."))	Mika Watanabe	Hideya Nakazaki	6:12
Total length:				31:10

== Charts ==
Chart (1997)	Peak position
Japanese Albums (Oricon)	57
