= Groovin' Blue (Miho Nakayama album) =

Studio album by Miho Nakayama
- Released: June 21, 1997
- Recorded: 1997
- Studio: Hitokuchizaka Studio
- Genre: J-pop; pop rock; R&B
- Length: 61:39
- Language: Japanese
- Label: King Records
- Producer: Miho Nakayama; Akira Fukuzumi

Miho Nakayama chronology
Treasury (1997)	Groovin' Blue (1997)	The Remixes: Miho Nakayama Meets New York Groove (1997)

Singles from Groovin' Blue
- 1. "March Color" Released: June 4, 1997

Groovin' Blue (グルービン・ブルー, Gurūbin Burū) is the 19th studio album by Japanese entertainer Miho Nakayama. Released through King Records on June 21, 1997, it features the single "March Color". It is the first album to have all songs written by Nakayama.

The album peaked at No. 28 on Oricon's albums chart and sold over 22,000 copies.

== Track listing ==
All lyrics are written by Miho Nakayama, except where indicated.

No.	Title	Lyrics	Music	Arrangement	Length
1.	"Sympathy"		Chika Ueda	Satoshi Takebe	3:59
2.	"Angel Soul"		Shinya Naitō	Naitō	5:18
3.	"Chīsana Taiyō (Carrot Red)" ((小さな太陽 -CARROT RED; "Little Sun (Carrot Red)"))		Naitō	Naitō	4:34
4.	"Yeah!"		Naitō	Naitō	3:34
5.	"Precious Love"	Nakayama; Masato Odake	Satoshi Yamaguchi; Yoshimasa Inoue	Shigeo Miyata	3:50
6.	"Shining for You"		Ueda	Naitō	3:56
7.	"Uso wa Yameta (Disappointed Love)" ((嘘はやめた〜Disappointed Love; "I Stopped Lying ~ Disappointed Love"))		Ueda	Yoshinobu Takeshita	6:39
8.	"March Color" (Māchi Karā (マーチカラー))	Nakayama; Odake	Yūko Ōtaki	Naitō	3:52
9.	"Fuwaraidō (What I Do)" ((付和雷同 -WHAT↑I↓DO-; "Following Blindly -What I Do-"))		Miyata	Miyata	5:12
10.	"Tsuki no Ring" (Tsuki no Ringu (月のリング; "Moon Ring"))		M. Rie	Naitō	5:10
11.	"Yasashii Hito" ((優しい人; "A Kind Person"))		Hitomi Taniwaki	Satoru Shionoya	4:04
12.	"Ruby in Glass"		Ōtaki	Takebe; Yoshinobu Takeshita (brass)	5:04
13.	"The Eternities"		Keisuke Araki	Miyata	6:27
Total length:					61:39

== Personnel ==
- Miho Nakayama – vocals
- Satoshi Takebe – keyboards (1, 12)
- Makoto Kuriya – keyboards (8)
- Keisuke Araki – keyboards (13)
- Tetsuo Ōtake – synthesizer programming (1, 12)
- Shinya Naitō – synthesizer programming (2–4, 6, 10–11), backing vocals (2–4)
- Shigeo Miyata – synthesizer programming (5, 9, 13)
- Kenji Miyamoto – synthesizer programming (5, 9, 13)
- Yoshinobu Takeshita – synthesizer programming (7–8)
- Satoru Shionoya – piano (11)
- Yoshiyuki Asano – guitar (2)
- Masayoshi Furukawa – guitar (4–6, 13), sitar (5)
- Kazuya Takayama – guitar (7–8)
- Jun Kajiwara – guitar (10)
- Yoshiyuki Sahashi – guitar (11)
- Yūji Toriyama – guitar (12)
- Kenji Takamizu – bass (11)
- Gen Ōgimi – percussion (2)
- Joe Katō Group – strings (1)
- Shirō Sasaki – trumpet (2, 4)
- Masanori Suzuki – trumpet (2, 4)
- Yōichirō Mizue – trumpet (12)
- Mitsukuni Kohata – trumpet (12)
- Hideaki Nakaji – trombone (2, 4)
- Hajime Yamamoto – saxophone (3), flute (3)
- Yoshinari Takegami – saxophone (7, 12)
- Akira Fujiyama – flute (11)
- Masaharu Ishibashi – flute (11)
- Masatsugu Shinozaki Group – strings (11)
- Junko Hirotani – backing vocals (2–3, 6–7)
- Seishirō Kusunose – backing vocals (5)
- Yūko Ōtaki – backing vocals (8, 12)
- Toshinori Yonekura – backing vocals (9)

== Charts ==
Chart (1997)	Peak position
Japanese Albums (Oricon)	28
