= The Remixes: Miho Nakayama Meets Los Angeles Groove =

Remix album by Miho Nakayama
- Released: January 9, 1998
- Recorded: 1997
- Genre: J-pop; pop rock; R&B
- Language: Japanese
- Label: King Records

Miho Nakayama chronology
The Remixes: Miho Nakayama Meets New York Groove (1997)	The Remixes: Miho Nakayama Meets Los Angeles Groove (1998)	Olive (1998)

The Remixes: Miho Nakayama Meets Los Angeles Groove is the third remix album by the Japanese entertainer Miho Nakayama. Released by King Records on January 9, 1998, it is a follow-up to The Remixes: Miho Nakayama Meets New York Groove, with six more remixes of songs selected from her back catalog.

The album peaked at No. 80 on Oricon's albums chart and sold over 4,000 copies.

== Track listing ==
All lyrics are written by Miho Nakayama, except where indicated.

No.	Title	Lyrics	Music	Length
1.	"Love for You"		Cindy
2.	"Sea Paradise (OL no Hanran)" ((Sea Paradise -OLの反乱-; "Sea Paradise -An Office Lady's Rebellion-"))		KNACK
3.	"Blue Stone"		Jeff Pfeifer; Rob Pfeifer
4.	"Fuwaraidō (What I Do)" ((付和雷同 -WHAT↑I↓DO-; "Following Blindly -What I Do-"))		Shigeo Miyata
5.	"I Know"	Rui Serizawa	Cindy
6.	"Treasure"	Yui Nishiwaki	Nishiwaki; Yōko Orihara

== Charts ==
Chart (1998)	Peak position
Japanese Albums (Oricon)	80
