= March Color =

1997 single by Miho Nakayama

Single by Miho Nakayama

from the album Groovin' Blue
- Language: Japanese
- B-side: "Shining for You"
- Released: June 4, 1997
- Recorded: 1997
- Genre: J-pop
- Length: 3:55
- Label: King Records
- Composer: Yūko Ōtaki
- Lyricists: Miho Nakayama; Masato Odake

Miho Nakayama singles chronology
"Mirai e no Present" (1996)	"March Color" (1997)	"Love Clover" (1998)

"March Color" (マーチ カラー, Māchi Karā) is the 36th single by Japanese entertainer Miho Nakayama. Written by Nakayama, Masato Odake and Yūko Ōtaki, the single was released on June 4, 1997, by King Records.

The single peaked at No. 29 on Oricon's weekly singles chart and sold over 25,000 copies.

== Track listing ==
8cm CD single
No.	Title	Lyrics	Music	Arrangement	Length
1.	"March Color" (Māchi Karā (マーチカラー))	Miho Nakayama; Masato Odake	Yūko Ōtaki	Yoshinobu Takeshita	3:55
2.	"Shining for You"	Nakayama	Chika Ueda	Shinya Naitō	3:59
3.	"March Color" (Original Karaoke)				3:54

== Charts ==
Chart (1997)	Peak position
Oricon Weekly Singles Chart	29
