= Mellow (Miho Nakayama song) =

1992 single by Miho Nakayama

Single by Miho Nakayama

from the album Mellow
- Language: Japanese
- B-side: "Silent"
- Released: April 1, 1992
- Recorded: 1991
- Genre: J-pop; pop rock
- Length: 5:53
- Label: King Records
- Composer: Yoshimasa Inoue
- Lyricist: Issaque

Miho Nakayama singles chronology
"Tōi Machi no Doko ka de..." (1991)	"Mellow" (1992)	"Sekaijū no Dare Yori Kitto" (1992)

"Mellow" (メロウ, Merou) is the 24th single by Japanese entertainer Miho Nakayama. Written by Nakayama (under the pseudonym "Issaque") and Yoshimasa Inoue, the single was released on April 1, 1992, by King Records.

== Background and release ==
"Mellow" was used by Este de Milord for a series of commercials featuring Nakayama.

"Mellow" became Nakayama's seventh straight No. 3 on Oricon's weekly singles chart. It sold over 169,000 copies and was certified Gold by the RIAJ.

== Track listing ==
8cm CD single
No.	Title	Lyrics	Music	Arrangement	Length
1.	"Mellow"	Issaque	Yoshimasa Inoue	Inoue	5:53
2.	"Silent"	Miho Nakayama	Chiho Kiyooka	Yoshio Tsuru	5:10
3.	"Mellow" (Original Karaoke)				5:52

== Charts ==
Chart (1992)	Peak position
Oricon Weekly Singles Chart	3

== Certification ==
Region	Certification	Certified units/sales
Japan (RIAJ)	Gold	200,000^{^}
^{^} Shipments figures based on certification alone.
