= Kore kara no I Love You =

1991 single by Miho Nakayama

Single by Miho Nakayama

from the album Jeweluna
- Language: Japanese
- English title: This Is I Love You
- B-side: "Dara ka ga Ai ni..."
- Released: February 12, 1991
- Recorded: 1990
- Genre: J-pop
- Label: King Records
- Composer: Kenjirō Sakiya
- Lyricist: Gorō Matsui

Miho Nakayama singles chronology
"Aishiterutte Iwanai!" (1990)	"Kore kara no I Love You" (1991)	"Rosa" (1991)

"Kore kara no I Love You" (これからのI Love You; lit. "This Is I Love You") is the 21st single by Japanese entertainer Miho Nakayama. Written by Gorō Matsui and Kenjirō Sakiya, the single was released on February 12, 1991, by King Records.

== Background and release ==
"Kore kara no I Love You" was rearranged from its original version in the album Jeweluna for its release as a single.

"Kore kara no I Love You" became Nakayama's fourth straight No. 3 on Oricon's weekly singles chart and sold over 145,000 copies.

== Track listing ==
8cm CD single
No.	Title	Lyrics	Music	Arrangement	Length
1.	"Kore kara no I Love You" ((これからのI Love You; "This Is I Love You"))	Gorō Matsui	Kenjirō Sakiya	ATOM Project; Sakiya (strings)
2.	"Dara ka ga Ai ni..." ((誰かが愛に…; "Someone Loves..."))	Miho Nakayama	Masaya Ozeki	ATOM Project

== Charts ==
Chart (1991)	Peak position
Oricon Weekly Singles Chart	3
