= Aishiterutte Iwanai! =

1990 single by Miho Nakayama

Single by Miho Nakayama

from the album Collection II
- Language: Japanese
- English title: I Don't Love You!
- B-side: "Without You"
- Released: October 22, 1990
- Recorded: 1990
- Genre: J-pop
- Label: King Records
- Composer: Hitoshi Haba
- Lyricist: Yoshihiko Andō

Miho Nakayama singles chronology
"Megamitachi no Bōken" (1990)	"Aishiterutte Iwanai!" (1990)	"Kore kara no I Love You" (1991)

"Aishiterutte Iwanai!" (愛してるっていわない!; lit. "I Don't Love You!") is the 20th single by Japanese entertainer Miho Nakayama. Written by Yoshihiko Andō and Hitoshi Haba, the single was released on October 22, 1990, by King Records.

== Background and release ==
"Aishiterutte Iwanai!" was used as the theme song of the Fuji TV drama series Suteki na Kataomoi (すてきな片想い; A Nice Unrequited Love), which also starred Nakayama. The B-side is "Without You", a Christmas song written by Nakayama (under her pseudonym "Mizuho Kitayama") for a Citizen Watch commercial she starred in.

"Aishiterutte Iwanai!" became Nakayama's third straight No. 3 on Oricon's weekly singles chart. It sold over 361,000 copies and was certified Gold by the RIAJ.

Nakayama performed the song on the 41st Kōhaku Uta Gassen in 1990.

== Track listing ==
8cm CD single
No.	Title	Lyrics	Music	Arrangement	Length
1.	"Aishiterutte Iwanai!" ((愛してるっていわない!; "I Don't Love You!"))	Yoshihiko Andō	Hitoshi Haba	Nobuhiko Kashiwara
2.	"Without You"	Mizuho Kitayama	Kazuo Ōtani	Ōtani

== Charts ==
Weekly charts

Chart (1990)	Peak position
Oricon Weekly Singles Chart	3

Year-end charts

Chart (1990)	Peak position
Oricon Year-End Chart	61

Chart (1991)	Peak position
Oricon Year-End Chart	85

== Certification ==
Region	Certification	Certified units/sales
Japan (RIAJ)	Gold	200,000^{^}
^{^} Shipments figures based on certification alone.
