= Iro White Blend =

1986 single by Miho Nakayama

Single by Miho Nakayama

from the album Collection
- Language: Japanese
- English title: Colored White Blend
- B-side: "Tokimeki no Season"
- Released: February 5, 1986
- Recorded: 1985
- Genre: J-pop; kayōkyoku
- Length: 4:14
- Label: King Records
- Composer: Mariya Takeuchi
- Lyricist: Mariya Takeuchi

Miho Nakayama singles chronology
"Be-Bop High School" (1985)	"Iro White Blend" (1986)	"Close Up" (1986)

"Iro White Blend" (色・ホワイトブレンド, Iro Howaito Burendo; lit. "Colored White Blend") is the fourth single by Japanese entertainer Miho Nakayama. Written by Mariya Takeuchi, the single was released on February 5, 1986, by King Records.

== Background and release ==
"Iro White Blend" was used by Shiseido for their spring 1986 commercials featuring Nakayama.

During the recording of the song, songwriter Mariya Takeuchi coached Nakayama in pronouncing the English lines of the lyrics. On live performances of the song, fans would wave white-colored handkerchiefs, towels, and hats.

"Iro White Blend" peaked at No. 5 on Oricon's weekly singles chart and sold over 223,000 copies, making it Nakayama's biggest-selling single until "Waku Waku Sasete" was released later that year.

Takeuchi self-covered the song on her 1987 album Request. Nakayama self-covered the song on her 2019 album Neuf Neuf.

== Track listing ==
All tracks are written by Mariya Takeuchi; all music is arranged by Nobuyuki Shimizu.

7" single
No.	Title	Length
1.	"Iro White Blend" (Iro Howaito Burendo (色・ホワイトブレンド; "Colored White Blend"))	4:14
2.	"Tokimeki no Season" (Tokimeki no Shīzun (ときめきの季節（シーズン）; "Crush Season"))

== Charts ==
Weekly charts

Chart (1986)	Peak position
Oricon Weekly Singles Chart	5
The Best Ten	5

Year-end charts

Chart (1986)	Peak position
Oricon Year-End Chart	38

== Cover versions ==
- Eriko Nakamura (as Haruka Amami) covered the song on the 2010 soundtrack album The Idolm@ster Master Special "Spring".

== See also ==
- 1986 in Japanese music
