= Tsuiteru ne Notteru ne =

1985 single by Miho Nakayama

Single by Miho Nakayama

from the album Collection
- Language: Japanese
- English title: It's Crazy, It's Knocking
- B-side: "Nakanai wa"
- Released: August 21, 1986
- Recorded: 1985
- Genre: J-pop; kayōkyoku; synth-pop; teen pop
- Length: 3:44
- Label: King Records
- Composer: Kyōhei Tsutsumi
- Lyricist: Takashi Matsumoto

Miho Nakayama singles chronology
"Jingi Aishite Moraimasu" (1986)	"Tsuiteru ne Notteru ne" (1986)	"Waku Waku Sasete" (1986)

"Tsuiteru ne Notteru ne" (ツイてるねノッてるね; lit. "It's Crazy, It's Knocking") is the seventh single by Japanese entertainer Miho Nakayama. Written by Takashi Matsumoto and Kyōhei Tsutsumi, the single was released on August 21, 1986, by King Records.

== Background and release ==
"Tsuiteru ne Notteru ne" was used by Shiseido for their autumn 1986 commercials featuring Nakayama

"Tsuiteru ne Notteru ne" peaked at No. 3 on Oricon's weekly singles chart and sold over 192,000 copies.

== Track listing ==
All lyrics are written by Takashi Matsumoto; all music is composed by Kyōhei Tsutsumi.

7" single
No.	Title	Arrangement	Length
1.	"Tsuiteru ne Notteru ne" ((ツイてるねノッてるね; "It's Crazy, It's Knocking"))	Masaaki Ōmura; Motoki Funayama	3:44
2.	"Nakanai wa" ((放課後; "I Won't Cry"))	Ōmura	4:29

== Charts ==
Weekly charts

Chart (1986)	Peak position
Oricon Weekly Singles Chart	3
The Best Ten	3
Uta no Top Ten	3

Year-end charts

Chart (1986)	Peak position
Oricon Year-End Chart	51
The Best Ten Year-End Chart	24

== See also ==
- 1986 in Japanese music
