= Be-Bop High School (song) =

1985 single by Miho Nakayama

Single by Miho Nakayama

from the album Collection
- Language: Japanese
- B-side: "Hōkago"
- Released: December 5, 1985
- Recorded: 1985
- Genre: J-pop; kayōkyoku; teen pop
- Length: 3:52
- Label: King Records
- Composer: Kyōhei Tsutsumi
- Lyricist: Takashi Matsumoto

Miho Nakayama singles chronology
"Namaiki" (1985)	"Be-Bop High School" (1985)	"Iro White Blend" (1986)

"Be-Bop High School" (ビーバップ・ハイ・スクール, Bībappu Hai Sukūru) is the third single by Japanese entertainer Miho Nakayama. Composed by Kyōhei Tsutsumi with lyrics by Takashi Matsumoto, the single was released on December 5, 1985, by King Records.

== Background and release ==
"Be-Bop High School" was the theme song of the Toei film of the same name, which starred Nakayama. The song was arranged with the incorporation of a steel guitar riff.

"Be-Bop High School" peaked at No. 4 on Oricon's weekly singles chart and sold over 179,000 copies, becoming Nakayama's first top-five hit.

== Track listing ==
All lyrics are written by Takashi Matsumoto; all music is composed by Kyōhei Tsutsumi.

7" single
No.	Title	Arrangement	Length
1.	"Be-Bop High School"	Mitsuo Hagita	3:52
2.	"Hōkago" ((放課後; "After School"))	Hiroshi Shinkawa

== Charts ==
Weekly charts

Chart (1985)	Peak position
Oricon Weekly Singles Chart	4
The Best Ten	5

Year-end charts

Chart (1986)	Peak position
Oricon Year-End Chart	54

== See also ==
- 1985 in Japanese music
