= 50/50 (song) =

1987 single by Miho Nakayama

Single by Miho Nakayama

from the album Collection
- Language: Japanese
- B-side: "Nanamena Ai wo Yurushite"
- Released: July 7, 1987
- Recorded: 1987
- Genre: J-pop; dance-pop
- Length: 4:01
- Label: King Records
- Composer: Tetsuya Komuro
- Lyricist: Shun Taguchi

Miho Nakayama singles chronology
"Hade!!!" (1987)	"50/50" (1987)	"Catch Me" (1987)

"50/50" (フィフティー・フィフティー, Fifutī Fifutī) is the 10th single by Japanese entertainer Miho Nakayama. Written by Shun Taguchi and Tetsuya Komuro, the single was released on July 7, 1987, by King Records.

== Background and release ==
"50/50" was Nakayama's second collaboration with composer Komuro, after "Jingi Aishite Moraimasu". The lyrics were by Taguchi, who wrote three of Yoko Minamino's No. 1 hits. The song was arranged with Caribbean elements; most notably the use of steelpans.

"50/50" peaked at No. 2 on Oricon's weekly singles chart and sold over 211,000 copies.

== Track listing ==
7" single
No.	Title	Lyrics	Music	Arrangement	Length
1.	"50/50"	Shun Taguchi	Tetsuya Komuro	Motoki Funayama
2.	"Nanamena Ai wo Yurushite" ((斜めな愛を許して; "Forgive the Diagonal Love"))	Mami Ayukawa	Ayukawa	Shirō Sagisu

== Charts ==
Weekly charts

Chart (1987)	Peak position
Oricon Weekly Singles Chart	2
The Best Ten	2
Uta no Top Ten	1

Year-end charts

Chart (1987)	Peak position
Oricon Year-End Chart	23
The Best Ten Year-End Chart	12
Uta no Top Ten Year-End Chart	14

== See also ==
- 1987 in Japanese music
