= Hade!!! =

1987 single by Miho Nakayama

Single by Miho Nakayama

from the album Collection
- Language: Japanese
- English title: Flashy!!!
- B-side: "Jealousy"
- Released: March 18, 1987
- Recorded: 1986
- Genre: J-pop; pop rock; kayōkyoku
- Length: 4:01
- Label: King Records
- Composer: Kyōhei Tsutsumi
- Lyricist: Takashi Matsumoto

Miho Nakayama singles chronology
"Waku Waku Sasete" (1986)	"Hade!!!" (1987)	"50/50" (1987)

"Hade!!!" (「派手!!!」; lit. "Flashy!!!") is the ninth single by the Japanese entertainer Miho Nakayama. Written by Takashi Matsumoto and Kyōhei Tsutsumi, the single was released on March 18, 1987, by King Records.

== Background and release ==
"Hade!!!" was used as the theme song of the TBS drama series Mama wa Idol (ママはアイドル, Mama wa Aidoru; Mama Is an Idol), which starred Nakayama. The B-side, "Jealousy", was used as an image song in the drama. This single was the final collaboration between Nakayama and the songwriters Matsumoto and Tsutsumi, after four albums and five singles (with an additional two singles written by Matsumoto and other composers).

"Hade" peaked at No. 2 on Oricon's weekly singles chart and sold over 205,000 copies.

== Track listing ==
All lyrics are written by Takashi Matsumoto; all music composed by Kyōhei Tsutsumi; all music arranged by Motoki Funayama.

7" single
No.	Title	Length
1.	"Hade!!!" (Flashy!!! (派手!!!))	4:01
2.	"Jealousy" (Jerashī (ジェラシー))

== Charts ==
Weekly charts

Chart (1987)	Peak position
Oricon Weekly Singles Chart	2
The Best Ten	4
Uta no Top Ten	3

Year-end charts

Chart (1987)	Peak position
Oricon Year-End Chart	24

== See also ==
- 1987 in Japanese music
