= Waku Waku Sasete =

1986 single by Miho Nakayama

Single by Miho Nakayama

from the album Exotique
- Language: Japanese
- English title: Excite Me More
- B-side: "Heart no Switch wo Oshite"
- Released: November 21, 1986 (7"); December 10, 1986 (12")
- Recorded: 1986
- Genre: J-pop; dance-pop
- Length: 3:58
- Label: King Records
- Composer: Kyōhei Tsutsumi
- Lyricist: Takashi Matsumoto
- Producers: Norio Higuchi; Kiyokazu Takahashi

Miho Nakayama singles chronology
"Tsuiteru ne Notteru ne" (1986)	"Waku Waku Sasete" (1986)	"Hade!!!" (1987)

Alternative cover
- "Waku Waku Sasete" (Party Version)

"Waku Waku Sasete" (WAKU WAKUさせて; lit. "Excite Me More") is the eighth single by Japanese entertainer Miho Nakayama. Composed by Kyōhei Tsutsumi with lyrics by Takashi Matsumoto, the single was released on November 21, 1986, by King Records. An extended remix of the song, known as the "Party Version", was released as a 12" single on December 10, 1986.

== Background and release ==
"Waku Waku Sasete" was used as the opening theme of the Fuji TV drama series Na-ma-i-ki Mori (な・ま・い・き盛り), which starred Nakayama.

Bassist Masato Nakamura was a member of Nakayama's backing band during live performances of the song before he went on to form the band Dreams Come True.

The B-side is "Heart no Switch wo Oshite", which was alternately titled "Switch On" in the album Exotique and the 1991 compilation album Miho's Select.

"Waku Waku Sasete" peaked at No. 3 on Oricon's weekly singles chart and sold over 237,000 copies, making it Nakayama's biggest-selling single until "You're My Only Shinin' Star" in 1988. The "Party Version" single peaked at No. 22 and sold over 2,900 copies.

== Track listing ==
All lyrics are written by Takashi Matsumoto; all music is composed by Kyōhei Tsutsumi; all music is arranged by Motoki Funayama.

7" single
No.	Title	Length
1.	"Waku Waku Sasete" ((WAKU WAKUさせて; "Excite Me More"))	3:58
2.	"Heart no Switch wo Oshite" (Hāto no Suitchi wo Oshite (ハートのスイッチを押して; "Press the Heart Switch"))	3:52

12" single
No.	Title	Length
1.	"Waku Waku Sasete" (Party Version)	6:12
2.	"Waku Waku Sasete" (Instrumental)	6:10

== Charts ==
Weekly charts

Chart (1986)	Peak position
Oricon Weekly Singles Chart	3
The Best Ten	3
Uta no Top Ten	2

Year-end charts

Chart (1987)	Peak position
Oricon Year-End Chart	17
Uta no Top Ten Year-End Chart	9

== Cover versions ==
- Kaori Momoi covered the song on her 1993 album More Standard.
- Junlie with Kegawazoku covered the song on the 2004 single "Wonderful World Location Roll".
- Kaoru covered the song on the 2006 various artists album Ladies Trance: Aishiteru.
- Chinami Ishizaka covered the song as the B-side of her 2007 single "Play Love ~Harenchina~".
- MAX covered the song on their 2010 cover album Be MAX.
- Janet Kay covered the song in English on her 2012 cover album Idol Kay.
- Houkago Princess covered the song on the 2013 various artists album King of Pops 2: Guitar Man GPK Meigi.

== See also ==
- 1986 in Japanese music
