= Jingi Aishite Moraimasu =

1986 single by Miho Nakayama

Single by Miho Nakayama

from the album Collection
- Language: Japanese
- B-side: "Rising Love"
- Released: July 15, 1986
- Recorded: 1986
- Genre: J-pop; kayōkyoku; dance-pop
- Label: King Records
- Composer: Tetsuya Komuro
- Lyricist: Takashi Matsumoto

Miho Nakayama singles chronology
"Close Up" (1986)	"Jingi Aishite Moraimasu" (1986)	"Tsuiteru ne Notteru ne" (1986)

"Jingi Aishite Moraimasu" (JINGI・愛してもらいます; lit. "Jingi, I Want You to Love Me") is the sixth single by Japanese entertainer Miho Nakayama. Written by Takashi Matsumoto and Tetsuya Komuro, the single was released on July 15, 1986, by King Records.

== Background and release ==
"Jingi Aishite Moraimasu" was used as the theme song of the Toei film Be-Bop High School: Yotaro Lamentation, which also starred Nakayama.

"Jingi Aishite Moraimasu" peaked at No. 4 on Oricon's weekly singles chart and sold over 138,000 copies.

== Track listing ==
7" single
No.	Title	Lyrics	Music	Arrangement	Length
1.	"Jingi Aishite Moraimasu" ((JINGI・愛してもらいます; "Jingi, I Want You to Love Me"))	Takashi Matsumoto	Tetsuya Komuro	Masaaki Ōmura
2.	"Rising Love"	Toshiki Kadomatsu	Kadomatsu	Kadomatsu

== Charts ==
Weekly charts

Chart (1986)	Peak position
Oricon Weekly Singles Chart	4
The Best Ten	10

Year-end charts

Chart (1986)	Peak position
Oricon Year-End Chart	89

== See also ==
- 1986 in Japanese music
