= Kyōhei Tsutsumi =

Japanese composer (1940–2020)

- Born: Eikichi Watanabe; May 28, 1940; Ushigome, Tokyo, Japan
- Died: October 7, 2020 (aged 80); Tokyo, Japan
- Other name: Jack Diamond
- Education: Aoyama Gakuin University
- Occupations: Composer, music producer, arranger
- Years active: 1963–2020
- Musical career
- Genres: Pop, rock, kayokyoku, soft rock, enka, easy listening
- Instruments: Piano, harpsichord
- Labels: Sony, EMI, Victor, King, Nippon Columbia

Kyōhei Tsutsumi (筒美 京平, Tsutsumi Kyouhei) (born Eikichi Watanabe, 28 May 1940 - 7 October 2020), was a Japanese composer, record producer and arranger.

Tsutsumi began his career as a songwriter about 1966, and he came to prominence as a composer of Ayumi Ishida's chart-topping hit "Blue Light Yokohama" in the late 1960s. He has released nearly 3,000 compositions to date, over 500 of which have entered the Japanese Oricon singles chart. Tsutsumi is the most commercially successful composer of the Japanese popular music of last five decades, selling over 76 million units on the country's singles chart from 1968 onwards.

Two of his compositions won the grand prix of Japan Record Award— "Mata Au Hi Made" performed by Kiyohiko Ozaki in 1971 and "Miserarete" by Judy Ongg in 1979. Tsutsumi himself has also won the awards for best songwriting category five times. Recognized for his long-term contribution to establish Japanese popular music, Tsutsumi received the Medal of Honor with Purple Ribbon by the Government of Japan in November 2003.

Tsutsumi died of aspiration pneumonia on October 7, 2020, after home recuperation, at age 80.

== Early life ==
Eikichi Watanabe (渡辺 栄吉, Watanabe Eikichi) was born on May 28, 1940, in Ushigome, Tokyo City, now part of Shinjuku Ward. He was a student of Aoyama Gakuin, one of the most prestigious educational institutes in Japan. Watanabe learned piano when he was in kindergarten, and joined the college's jazz club in his teen years. After graduating from University, Watanabe worked as a director of Nippon Grammophon, a Japanese record label which later changed its name to Polydor Japan and is now owned by Universal Music Group. Tadataka Watanabe, his younger brother, became a record executive too, who has been chief producer of Warner Music Japan and well known as a discoverer of multi-million selling folk-rock duo Kobukuro.

== Career ==
On the suggestion of lyricist Jun Hashimoto, his senior graduate of university, Watanabe began his songwriting career under the pen name Kyohei Tsutsumi. "Kiiroi Lemon", his first recorded compositions co-written by Hashimoto and sung by then-unknown Masato Shimon (using stage name Kōichi Fuji), was issued as a single in 1966. However, it was initially released as a work composed by Kōichi Sugiyama, and Tsutsumi's name was not credited on the original pressing of the record.

Tsutsumi's first hit, "Barairo no Kumo", was performed by the Village Singers and released as a single in 1967. He rose to fame in 1969, after release of "Blue Light Yokohama" recorded by singer and actress Ayumi Ishida. It was released as a single on Christmas Day of 1968 and topped the Japanese Oricon sales chart in the following year, becoming the fifth record to have sold over 1 million copies since the chart started counting sales in 1968. As a composer of the song, Tsutsumi won the 11th Japan Record Awards for the best songwriting category on December 31, 1969.

In 2020, he became one of eight recipients of the Special Lifetime Achievement Award at the 62nd Japan Record Awards.

== Selected discography ==
=== Studio albums ===
During the late 1960s and the 1970s, Tsutsumi released the following of his own albums. Most of those efforts were reissued in 2006, as part of compilation series entitled Kyohei Tsutsumi Solo Works Collection released by five different labels — EMI Music Japan, Sony Music Entertainment, King Records, Victor Entertainment, and Nippon Columbia.

Album	Details
Piano ga Utau "Osanai Hi" (ピアノが歌う“幼い日”)	Performer: Kyohei Tsutsumi and the Feather Tones; Released: 1968; Label: King Records
Cembalo Deluxe Vol.1: Koi no Kisetsu (恋の季節)	Performer: Kyohei Tsutsumi and the Feather Tones; Released: 1968; Label: King Records
Cembalo Deluxe Vol.2: Nanairo no Shiawase (七色のしあわせ)	Performer: Kyohei Tsutsumi and the Feather Tones; Released: 1969; Label: King Records
Cembalo Deluxe Vol.3: Ano Hi Nagisa de... (あの日渚で…)	Performer: Kyohei Tsutsumi and the Feather Tones; Released: 1969; Label: King Records
Futatsu no Hoshi (二つの星)	Performer: Kyohei Tsutsumi and Kunihiko Suzuki; Released: July 10, 1969; Label: Nippon Columbia
Hit Piano Touch	Performer: Kyohei Tsutsumi Orchestra; Released: 1969; Label: Toshiba EMI
Hit! Hit! Hit!: "Shiranaide Aisarete/Koibito" (知らないで愛されて／恋人)	Performer: Kyohei Tsutsumi Orchestra; Released: March 1970; Label: Nippon Columbia
Easy Listening Deluxe Album: Kyohei Tsutsumi Hit Original Sound by 16-ch System	Performer: Kyohei Tsutsumi Orchestra; Released: 1970; Label: Victor
Headlight	Performer: Kyohei Tsutsumi Orchestra; Released: May 10, 1970; Label: Nippon Columbia
Bacharach Meet the Beatles	Performer: Kyohei Tsutsumi and the Feather Tones; Released: 1971; Label: King Records
Dynamic Young Hit Deluxe	Performer: Kyohei Tsutsumi and the Feather Tones; Released: 1971; Label: Toshiba EMI
Tsutsumi Kyohei no Hibiki (筒美京平の響)	Performer: Kyohei Tsutsumi and Sound Now Orchestra; Released: 1972; Label: Sony
Seishun no Harmony: Mirai kara Kita Tegami (青春のハーモニー～未来からきた手紙～)	Performer: Kyohei Tsutsumi and Sound Now Orchestra; Released: 1972; Label: Sony
Eiko e no Dasshutsu (栄光への脱出)	Performer: Kyohei Tsutsumi and Sound Now Orchestra; Released: 1972; Label: Victor
Spectacle Sound by Special Request	Performer: Kyohei Tsutsumi and Silver Strings; Released: 1973; Label: Toshiba EMI
Hit Machine: Tsutsumi Kyohei no Sekai (筒美京平の世界)	Performer: Doctor Dragon and the Oriental Express; Released: 1976; Label: Toshiba EMI

=== Number-one hits on the Oricon singles chart ===
Year	Single	Performer	Lyricist
1968	"Blue Light Yokohama" (ブルー・ライト・ヨコハマ)	Ayumi Ishida	Jun Hashimoto
1971	"Mata Au Hi Made" (また逢う日まで)	Kiyohiko Ozaki	Yū Aku
1973	"Akai Fūsen" (赤い風船)	Miyoko Asada	Kazumi Yasui
1973	"Watashi no Kare wa Hidari-kiki" (わたしの彼は左きき)	Megumi Asaoka	Kazuya Senke
1974	"Yoroshiku Aishū" (よろしく哀愁)	Hiromi Gō	Kazumi Yasui
1974	"Amai Seikatsu" (甘い生活)	Gorō Noguchi	Michio Yamagami
1975	"Romance"	Hiromi Iwasaki	Yū Aku
1975	"Sentimental"	Hiromi Iwasaki	Yū Aku
1979	"Miserarete (Theme of Aegean Sea)" (魅せられて (エーゲ海のテーマ))	Judy Ongg	Yōko Aki
1979	"Sexual Violet No. 1"	Masahiro Kuwana	Takashi Matsumoto
1980	"Sneaker Blues" (スニーカーぶる～す)	Masahiko Kondō	Takashi Matsumoto
1981	"Blue Jeans Memory"	Masahiko Kondō	Takashi Matsumoto
1981	"Gingiragin ni Sarigenaku" (ギンギラギンにさりげなく)	Masahiko Kondō	Ayumi Date
1982	"Jōnetsu Neppū Serenade" (情熱熱風せれなーで)	Masahiko Kondō	Ayumi Date
1982	"Furarete Banzai" (ふられてBANZAI)	Masahiko Kondō	Takashi Matsumoto
1982	"Harajuku Kiss" (原宿キッス)	Toshihiko Tahara	Akira Miyashita
1982	"Shower na Kibun" (シャワーな気分)	Toshihiko Tahara	Yoshiko Miura
1982	"Horetaze! Kanpai" (ホレたぜ! 乾杯)	Masahiko Kondō	Takashi Matsumoto
1983	"Midnight Station"	Masahiko Kondō	Takashi Matsumoto
1983	"Tameiki Rockabilly" (ためいきロ・カ・ビ・リー)	Masahiko Kondō	Takashi Matsumoto
1983	"Royal Straight Flush"	Masahiko Kondō	Takashi Matsumoto
1984	"Ichiban Yarō" (一番野郎)	Masahiko Kondō	Masao Urino
1984	"Meikyu no Androla" (迷宮のアンドローラ)	Kyōko Koizumi	Takashi Matsumoto
1984	"Yamatonadeshiko Shichihenge" (ヤマトナデシコ七変化)	Kyōko Koizumi	Chinfa Kan
1985	"Majo" (魔女)	Kyōko Koizumi	Takashi Matsumoto
1985	"Nantettatte Idol" (なんてったってアイドル)	Kyōko Koizumi	Yasushi Akimoto
1985	"Kamen Butōkai" (仮面舞踏会)	Shōnentai	Tetsuya Chiaki
1987	"Ballad no You ni Nemure" (バラードのように眠れ)	Shōnentai	Takashi Matsumoto
1987	"Naimono Nedari no I Want You" (ないものねだりのI Want You)	C-C-B	Takashi Matsumoto
1987	"Mizu no Rouge" (水のルージュ)	Kyōko Koizumi	Takashi Matsumoto
1987	"Stripe Blue"	Shōnentai	Takashi Matsumoto
1987	"Sayonara no Kajitsutachi" (さよならの果実たち)	Yōko Oginome	Masao Urino
1987	"Kimi Dake ni" (君だけに)	Shōnentai	Chinfa Kan
1987	"Naite Mirya Iijan" (泣いてみりゃいいじゃん)	Masahiko Kondo	Chinfa Kan
1987	"ABC"	Shōnentai	Takashi Matsumoto
1988	"Jirettai ne" (じれったいね)	Shōnentai	Hiromi Mori
1994	"Tenca wo Torō (Uchida no Yabō)" (TENCAを取ろう―内田の野望)	Yuki Uchida	Kohmi Hirose, Sora Kawasaki
1999	"Yamenaide, Pure" (やめないで、Pure)	KinKi Kids	Takashi Matsumoto
2003	"Ambitious Japan!	Tokio	Rei Nakanishi

=== Compilation and tribute albums ===
- Various artists - Hit Story: Kyohei Tsutsumi Ultimate Collection 1967-1997 Volume 1 (4-CD box set) (1997, Sony)
- Various artists - Hit Story: Kyohei Tsutsumi Ultimate Collection 1967-1997 Volume 2 (4-CD box set) (1997, Sony)
- Various artists - Kyohei Tsutsumi Ultra Best Tracks / Soul & Disco (1998, Victor)
- Various artists - Kyohei Tsutsumi Ultra Best Tracks / 60's Rare Tracks (1998, Victor)
- Various artists - Kyohei Tsutsumi Ultra Best Tracks / 70's Collection (1998, Victor)
- Various artists - Kyohei Tsutsumi Ultra Best Tracks / 80's Girlie Pop (1998, Victor)
- Various artists - Kyohei Tsutsumi Ultra Best Tracks / Polygram Girls Pop (1998, New Taurus)
- Various artists - Kyohei Tsutsumi Ultra Best Tracks / Polygram GS and Guys (1998, New Taurus)
- Various artists - Kyohei Tsutsumi Ultra Best Tracks / Columbia Edition Vol.1 60's and 70's (1998, Nippon Columbia)
- Various artists - Kyohei Tsutsumi Ultra Best Tracks / GS and Rarities (1998, Toshiba EMI)
- Various artists - Kyohei Tsutsumi Ultra Best Tracks / Girls Pop 80's (1998, Toshiba EMI)
- Ayumi Ishida - Kyohei Tsutsumi Tracks (2-CD) (1998, Nippon Columbia)
- Yukari Itō - Kyohei Tsutsumi Ultra Best Tracks (1998, Nippon Columbia)
- Goro Noguchi - Kyohei Tsutsumi Ultra Best Tracks (1998, New Taurus)
- Miki Hirayama - Kyohei Tsutsumi Ultra Best Tracks (1998, Nippon Columbia)
- Saori Minami - Golden Best: Cynthia Sings Kyohei Tsutsumi (2-CD) (2002, Sony)
- Yukiji Asaoka - Golden Best: Sings Kyohei Tsutsumi (2002, Sony)
- Miki Hirayama - Golden Best: Sings Kyohei Tsutsumi and More (2003, Sony)
- Sumiko Sakamoto - Golden Best (2003, Sony)
- YuYa - Idol Miracle Bible Series: Sings Kyohei Tsutsumi and More (2003, Sony)
- Yū Hayami - Golden Best: Yu Hayami/Kyohei Tsutsumi Pops Best (2003, Universal)
- Various artists - The Hit Maker (6-CD box set) (2006, Sony)
- Various artists - Kyohei Disco Night: Kyohei Tsutsumi Remix (2007, Nippon Columbia)
- Various artists - Kyohei Tsutsumi Tribute: The Popular Music (2007, Universal)
- Chiyo Okumura - Chiyo Tsutsumi Kyohei o Utau (2010, HotWax/Solid)
- Yūko Asano - Golden Best Limited: Sings Kyohei Tsutsumi (2011, Sony)
- Hiroyuki Okita - Golden Best Limited: Sings Kyohei Tsutsumi (2011, Sony)
- Various artists - Mayonaka no Bossa Nova: Jun Hashimoto and Kyohei Tsutsumi Golden Album Around 1969 (2012, Nippon Columbia)
