= Miho Nakayama =

Japanese singer and actress (1970–2024)

- 中山 美穂
- Nakayama in September 2024
- Born: 1 March 1970; Saku, Nagano, Japan
- Died: 6 December 2024 (aged 54); Tokyo, Japan
- Other names: Miporin (ミポリン); Mizuho Kitayama (北山 瑞穂); Issaque (一咲)
- Occupations: Singer; lyricist; actress
- Years active: 1985–2024
- Agent: Big Apple
- Height: 158 cm (5 ft 2 in)
- Spouse: Hitonari Tsuji (m. 2002; div. 2014)
- Children: 1
- Relatives: Shinobu Nakayama (sister)
- Musical career
- Genres: J-pop; kayōkyoku; city pop; dance-pop; pop rock
- Instruments: Vocals; guitar
- Works: Miho Nakayama discography
- Label: King Records
- Formerly of: Toshiki Kadomatsu; Wands; Mayo Okamoto

Japanese name
- Kanji: 中山 美穂
- Hiragana: なかやま みほ
- Katakana: ナカヤマ ミホ
Transcriptions
- Romanization: Nakayama Miho
- Website: nakayamamiho.com

Miho Nakayama (中山 美穂, Nakayama Miho; 1 March 1970 – 6 December 2024) was a Japanese singer and actress. She made her debut in the 1985 drama Maido Osawagase Shimasu, where her performance led to instant stardom. Nakayama released her debut single, "C", shortly after, and finished the year with her film debut in the blockbuster Be-Bop High School. She became one of the most popular idols during its "Golden Age" in the 1980s. Nicknamed Miporin (ミポリン), Nakayama occasionally used the pseudonyms Mizuho Kitayama (北山 瑞穂, Kitayama Mizuho) or Issaque (一咲, Issaku) when she wrote song lyrics.

After pivoting towards a dance-oriented sound, she achieved five consecutive number one singles. Her best known songs from this period include "Waku Waku Sasete", "50/50", "Catch Me" and "You're My Only Shinin' Star". In the 1990s, she wrote lyrics and recorded ballads, resulting in several platinum singles and her biggest sales: "Tōi Machi no Doko ka de..." (1991), "Sekaijū no Dare Yori Kitto" (1992) with Wands, and "Tada Nakitaku Naru no" (1994).

Nakayama received positive reviews for her lead roles in Love Letter (1995) and Tokyo Weather (1997).

== Early life and education ==
Nakayama was born on 1 March 1970, in Saku, Nagano. After her mother remarried, her family moved to Koganei, Tokyo, where Nakayama attended Koganei Municipal Junior High School.

== Career ==
Miho Nakayama in 1986.

=== Singing ===
After a talent scout discovered her in Harajuku, Nakayama debuted on 21 June 1985 with her single "C", and with her starring role in the film Be-Bop High School. Throughout her career as a singer and actress, she recorded 22 studio albums and scored eight No. 1 singles on Oricon charts, two of which sold over one million copies each. She also starred in a 1987 Famicom Disk System adventure game produced by Nintendo titled Nakayama Miho no Tokimeki High School, in which she played a high school student who tries to conceal her actual identity.

By the 1990s, her artistry began to mature as she penned lyrics and recorded ballads, resulting in several platinum singles and her biggest sales: "Tōi Machi no Doko ka de..." (1991), "Sekaijū no Dare Yori Kitto" (1992) with Wands, and "Tada Nakitaku Naru no" (1994). Nicknamed Miporin (ミポリン), Nakayama occasionally used the pseudonyms Mizuho Kitayama (北山 瑞穂, Kitayama Mizuho) or Issaque (一咲, Issaku) when she wrote song lyrics.

=== Acting ===
In 1995, director Shunji Iwai cast Nakayama in the starring dual roles of Hiroko Watanabe and Itsuki Fujii in the film Love Letter. The film was a huge box-office success, and Nakayama won Best Actress awards for her role in the film at the 38th Blue Ribbon Awards, the 17th Yokohama Film Festival and the 18th Hochi Film Awards.

On 8 November 2021, Nakayama starred alongside King & Prince member Yuta Jinguji in the stage play Aoi no Ue/Yoroboshi (『葵上』『弱法師』; Lady Aoi/Weak Lawyer) at The Globe Tokyo. The play ran until December 5.

From 1985, she was represented by Big Apple Co., Ltd.

== Awards ==
Nakayama was nominated for a Best Actress Japanese Academy Award in 1998 for her role in Tokyo Biyori, and has appeared in numerous TV series including Love Story (2001).

== Personal life ==
Nakayama's younger sister is Shinobu Nakayama, also an actress and retired pop singer. She also has a younger brother named Tomoaki.

Two years after her friend Yasuko Endō died by suicide, Nakayama wrote the lyrics and composed the music for the song, "Long Distance to Heaven," that she performed during a 1988 concert tour. A requiem for Endō, the song commemorated Endō's cancelled debut single "In the Distance." It was included in her July 1988 album Mind Game, and mentioned in her 1991 essay collection P.S. I Love You. Without specifying Endō's name, Nakayama wrote about her in her 2009 photo essay collection Nazenara Yasashii Machi ga Atta Kara.

In 2002, Nakayama married musician Hitonari Tsuji after an eight-month relationship. They moved to Paris, where they had a son a year later. In 2014, Nakayama and Tsuji divorced, and Nakayama moved back to Japan, with Tsuji retaining custody of their son.

== Death and impact ==
Nakayama was found dead in her house by her staff in Ebisu, Shibuya, Tokyo on December 6th 2024 at the age of 54. Her Christmas show in Osaka had been scheduled for that day, but it had been canceled due to her declining health. According to investigators, Nakayama's colleague visited her house after finding out that she did not show up for work that day. Police later announced that they found no signs of foul play after conducting an autopsy, while agency Big Apple said in a statement that Nakayama died due to an accident while she was bathing. The agency added that they are considering the possibility of hosting a public life celebration for Nakayama. On December 12th, Nakayama's remains were cremated at a private funeral attended by her sister Shinobu.

A public memorial was held at the Tokyo International Forum on April 22nd 2025. A special tribute concert to commemorate Nakayama's 40th anniversary was held at NHK Hall on June 18th. The venue was originally planned by Nakayama as the penultimate show of her 2025 tour.

== Discography ==
Studio albums

- C (1985)
- After School (1985)
- Summer Breeze (1986)
- Exotique (1986)
- One and Only (1987)
- Catch the Nite (1988)
- Mind Game (1988)
- Angel Hearts (1988)
- Hide 'n' Seek (1989)
- Merry Merry (1989)
- All for You (1990)
- Jeweluna (1990)
- Dé eaya (1991)
- Mellow (1992)
- Wagamama na Actress (1993)
- Pure White (1994)
- Mid Blue (1995)
- Deep Lip French (1996)
- Groovin' Blue (1997)
- Olive (1998)
- Manifesto (1999)
- Neuf Neuf (2019)

== Filmography ==
=== Film ===
Release date	Title	Distributor	Role	Director	Co-stars	Theme song
12/14/1985	Be-Bop High School	Tōei Co., Ltd.	Kyōko Izumi	Hiroyuki Nasu	Kojiro Shimizu, Tōru Nakamura, Masumi Miyazaki	Miho Nakayama/"Be-Bop High School"
8/9/1986	Be-Bop High School: Kōkō Yotarō Elegy	Tōei Co., Ltd.	Kyōko Izumi	Hiroyuki Nasu	Kojiro Shimizu, Tōru Nakamura, Masumi Miyazaki	Miho Nakayama/"Jingi Aishite Moraimasu"
8/26/1989	Who Do I Choose?	Toho	Nobuko Kuwata	Shūsuke Kaneko	Hiroyuki Sanada, Tōru Kazama, Rie Miyazawa	Miho Nakayama/"Virgin Eyes"
8/31/1991	Nami no Kazu dake Dakishimete	Toho	Mariko Tanaka	Yasuo Baba	Yuji Oda, Yuki Matsushita, Tetsuya Bessho	
3/25/1995	Love Letter	Herald Ace	Hiroko Watanabe/Itsuki Fujii	Shunji Iwai	Etsushi Toyokawa, Miki Sakai, Takashi Kashiwabara	
10/18/1997	Tokyo Weather	Toho	Yōko Shimatsu	Naoto Takenaka	Naoto Takenaka, Takako Matsu, Tomokazu Miura	Taeko Ōnuki/"Himawari"
1/23/2010	Sayonara Someday	Asmik Ace	Kutsuko Manaka	John H. Lee	Hidetoshi Nishijima, Yuriko Ishida, Takehiro Hira, Takahiro Nishijima, Masaya Kato	Mika Nakashima/"Always"
10/6/2012	I Have to Buy New Shoes	Tōei Co., Ltd.	Aoi Teshigawara	Eriko Kitagawa	Osamu Mukai, Mirei Kiritani	
4/27/2018	Marmalade Boy	Warner Bros.	Chiyako Matsuura	Ryūichi Hiroki	Hinako Sakurai, Ryo Yoshizawa, Michitaka Tsutsui, Shōsuke Tanihara, Rei Dan	GReeeeN/"Koi"
5/12/2018	Butterfly Sleep	Kadokawa Pictures	Ryoko Matsumura	Jeong Jae-eun	Kim Jae-wook, Anna Ishibashi, Shun Sugata, Masanobu Katsumura, Masatoshi Nagase	
1/25/2019	Ai Uta: My Promise to Nakuhito	Tōei Co., Ltd.	Saeko Hashino	Taisuke Kawamura	Ryusei Yokohama, Kaya Kiyohara, Hiroki Iijima, Riko Narumi, Naomi Zaizen	GReeeeN/"Yakusoku x No title"
10/25/2019	108: Revenge and Adventure of Goro Kaiba	Phantom Film Co., Ltd.	Ayako Kaiba	Suzuki Matsuo	Suzuki Matsuo, Shunsuke Daitō, Louis Kurihara, LiLiCo, Seizō Fukumoto	Gen Hoshino/"Yoru no Bōto"
1/17/2020	Last Letter	Toho	Sakae	Shunji Iwai	Takako Matsu, Masaharu Fukuyama, Suzu Hirose, Nana Mori, Etsushi Toyokawa	Nana Mori/"Kaeru no Uta"
5/6/2022	Lesson in Murder	The KlockWorx Co., Ltd.	Eriko Kakei	Kazuya Shiraishi	Sadao Abe, Kenshi Okada, Takanori Iwata, Yū Miyazaki	

=== Television series ===
Broadcast dates	Title	Network	Role	Co-stars	Theme song
1/8–3/26 (1985)	Maido Osawagase Shimasu	TBS	Nodoka Mori	Akira Onodera, Kazuya Kimura, Hiroko Shino	C-C-B/"Romantic ga Tomaranai"
4/12/1985	Uchi no Ko ni Kagitte..., Part 2, Episode 1 (guest appearance)	TBS	Nobuko Takaoka	Masakazu Tamura, Aiko Morishita, George Tokoro, Reiko Nakamura, Nobuko Miyamoto	
8/20–9/25 (1985)	Story of a Summer Experience	TBS	Yuki Sugimoto	Naoko Amihama, Shōjotai, Yoshi Ikuzō, Eri Ishida, Arthur Kuroda	Miho Nakayama/"C"
12/10/1985 – 3/25/1986	Maido Osawagase Shimasu, Part 2	TBS	Nodoka Mori	Akira Onodera, Kazuya Kimura, Hiroko Shino	C-C-B/"Kūsō Kiss"
10/13/1986–3/23/1987	Sailor Suit Rebel Alliance	Nippon TV	Miho Yamagata	Nobuko Sendō, Risa Yamamoto, Kyōko Gotō, Ren Osugi, Kazuki Minabuchi	A-JARI/"Shadow of Love"
10/16–12/18 (1986)	Na-ma-i-ki Zakari	Fuji TV	Kayoko Kinoshita	Shigeyuki Nakamura, Kahori Torii, Yōichi Yamamoto, Taiji Yano, Chiaki Watanabe	Miho Nakayama/"Waku Waku Sasete"
4/14–6/16 (1987)	Mama Is an Idol (1987)	TBS	herself	Kunihiko Mitamura, Kumiko Goto, Masatoshi Nagase	Miho Nakayama/"Hade!!!"
10/22–12/24 (1987)	Ohima nara Kite yo ne!	Fuji TV	Nozomi Satake/Yōko Hirose	Yu-ki Matsumura, Shizuka Kudo, Kazuhiko Kanayama	Miho Nakayama/"Catch Me"
1987	Maido Osawagase Shimasu, Part 3 (guest appearance)	TBS	Nodoka Mori	Hiroshi Katsuno, Risa Tachibana	
7/8–9/23 (1988)	Waka-Okusama wa Ude-Makuri!	TBS	Tomoko Hirose	Kunihiko Mitamura, Noriko Sengoku, Mari Nishio, Jun Miho, Kazuyuki Matsuzawa	Miho Nakayama/"Mermaid"
1/16–3/20 (1989)	Can't Take My Eyes Off You!	Fuji TV	Hitomi Takagi	Momoko Kikuchi, Tomoko Fujita, Kōyō Maeda, Gitan Ōtsuru	Mariko Murai/"Dōshiyō mo naku Renai (Love Affair)"
1/12–3/30 (1990)	Graduation	TBS	Kaori Kinoshita	Yūji Oda, Nobuko Sendō, Michiko Kawai, Koji Matoba	Dreams Come True/"Egao no Yukue"
10/15–12/17 (1990)	Wonderful One-Sided Love	Fuji TV	Keiko Yoda	Toshiro Yanagiba, Emi Wakui, Mikihisa Azuma, Ken Ishiguro	Miho Nakayama/"Aishiterutte Iwanai!"
10/7–12/16 (1991)	When I Really Miss You, but You Are Not Here...	Fuji TV	Miyoko Oki	Gitan Ōtsuru, Kenji Moriwaki, Fumiya Fujii, Tōru Kazama	Miho Nakayama/"Tōi Machi no Doko ka de..."
1/5–12/13 (1992)	NHK Taiga drama: Nobunaga: King of Zipangu	NHK	Nene	Naoto Ogata, Momoko Kikuchi, Jirō Hiramiki, Tōru Nakamura	
10/14–12/23 (1992)	Somebody Loves Her	Fuji TV	Tsubasa Takano	Jinpachi Nezu, Kōji Matoba, Mayu Tsuruta	Miho Nakayama & Wands/"Sekaijū no Dare Yori Kitto"
1/7–3/25 (1994)	Moshimo Negai ga Kanau nara	TBS	Mirai Mōri	Masatoshi Hamada, Takashi Hamazaki, Kōki Okada, Marina Watanabe	Miho Nakayama/"Tada Nakitaku Naru no"
1/9–3/20 (1995)	FOR YOU	Fuji TV	Yayoi Yoshikura	Masanobu Takashima, Katsunori Takahashi, Hiroko Moriguchi, Shingo Katori	Miho Nakayama/"Hero"
10/14–12/16 (1996)	Delicious Relations	Fuji TV	Momoe Fujiwara	Toshiaki Karasawa, Tsuyoshi Kusanagi, Naoko Iijima	Miho Nakayama/"Mirai e no Present"
10/8–12/24 (1998)	Nemureru Mori	Fuji TV	Minako Ōba	Takuya Kimura, Tōru Nakamura, Yūsuke Santamaria	Mariya Takeuchi/"Camouflage"
1/10–3/20 (2000)	Love 2000	Fuji TV	Rieru Mashiro	Takeshi Kaneshiro, Yukie Nakama, Mikihisa Azuma	Do As Infinity/"Yesterday & Today"
4/15–6/24 (2001)	Love Story	TBS	Misaki Sutō	Etsushi Toyokawa, Haruhiko Katō, Shingo Katori, Yūka	Spitz/"Haruka"
10/7–12/16 (2002)	Home and Away	Fuji TV	Kaede Nakamori	Naomi Nishida, Kōtarō Koizumi, Wakana Sakai	day after tomorrow/"Hello, Everybody!"
5/25–7/13 (2014)	Platonic	NHK BS Premium	Sara Mochizuki	Tsuyoshi Domoto, Kōtarō Koizumi, Mei Nagano	
8/20–9/10 (2016)	Love of the Wise Man	Wowow	Mayuko Takanaka	Ryō Ryūsei, Saki Takaoka, Seiichi Tanabe	
4/17–6/26 (2017)	The Noble Detective	Fuji TV	Tanaka (maid)	Masaki Aiba, Emi Takei, Yukie Nakama	Arashi/"I'll Be There"
1/7–1/28 (2018)	The Makioka Sisters	NHK BS Premium	Tsuruko Makioka	Saki Takaoka, Ayumi Ito, Yuri Nakamura	
10/11–12/13 (2018)	Like Shooting Stars in the Twilight	Fuji TV	Mariko Takizawa	Kuranosuke Sasaki, Hitomi Kuroki, Ryūsei Fujii	Ken Hirai/"Half of Me"
5/10/2019	The Women of Tokyo's 23 Wards (Episode 5: The Woman of Itabashi Ward)	Wowow	Kaoru	Mafia Kajita, Yū Asakawa, Shigemitsu Ogi	
10/25/2019	Time Limit Investigator (Episode 3, guest appearance)	TV Asahi	Machiko Kotobuki	Joe Odagiri, Kumiko Aso, Tetsuya Bessho	
1/11–2/29 (2020)	Things You Can Know by Looking at Them	Wowow	Momoko Uchida	Tae Kimura, Yuko Oshima, Yusuke Kamiji, Hiroshi Nagano, Katsuhisa Namase	
3/19/2021	Three-Star Bar in Tokyo's West Ogikubo District (Episode 6)	Mainichi Broadcasting	Naomi Saigawa	Keita Machida, Kisetsu Fujiwara, Win Morisaki	I Don't Like Mondays./"Entertainer"
4/30–7/2 (2021)	Keishichō Zero-Gakari Seikatsu Anzenka Nande mo Sōdan-shitsu (Season 5)	TV Tokyo	Rei Hoshina	Kōtarō Koizumi, Yuki Matsushita	Hideaki Tokunaga/"Tomorrow"
7/31–9/18 (2021)	The High School Heroes	TV Asahi	Ruriko Manaka	Taishō Iwasaki, Yūto Nasu, Ryūga Satō, Naoki Fujii, Issei Kanasashi, Hidaka Ukisho	KAT-TUN/"Euphoria"
7/18/2022	Renovation Like Magic (Episode 1, guest appearance)	Kansai TV・Fuji TV	Machi Nishizaki	Haru, Shotaro Mamiya	

=== Television movies ===
Broadcast date	Title	Network	Role	Co-stars
3/3/1986	Monday Drama Land: Fujiko Fujio's Dream Camera	Fuji TV	Sayoko Shiratori	Kyoko Koizumi, Yōko Oginome
5/15/1986	Thursday Drama Street: Aitsu to Watashi	Fuji TV	Keiko Nishida	Yu-ki Matsumura, Kyoko Enami, Yumiko Fujita, Ayumi Tsuchiya
4/2/1987	Tuesday Super Wide: Hanjuku Widow! Mibōjin wa Jūhassai	TV Asahi	Tamao Suzumoto	Shingo Tsurumi
10/2/1987	Papa wa Newscaster (special edition, guest appearance)	TBS	herself	Masakazu Tamura, Honami Suzuki, Jun Fubuki
12/20/1988	Tuesday Super Wide: Mismatch	TV Asahi	Tamaki Sugihara	Shizuka Kudo, Masanori Sera
4/19/1990	Tales of the Unusual: Fearful Touch	Fuji TV	Satomi Ayukawa	Johnny Ōkura
12/26/1990	Chūshingura	TBS	Okaru	Takeshi Kitano (Beat Takeshi), Keiko Takeshita, Takanori Jinnai, Claude Maki, Masami Shimojō
1/23/1991	Suiyō Gurando Roman: Itsuka, Sarejio Kyōkai de	Nippon TV	Taeko Yamamoto	Eisaku Yoshida
8/27/1992	Drama City '92: Ai shite iru to Kaite Mita	Yomiuri TV		Nobuyuki Ishii, Mayumi Hasegawa
1/3/1994	New Spring Drama Special '94: Aogeba Tōtoshi (Episode 1: "Ni-nen C-gumi no Kiseki")	Fuji TV	Chiaki Sawai	Teruyoshi Uchimura, Rie Tomosaka
12/23/1995	Seiya no Kiseki (Episode 2: "Seisha ga Machi ni Yattekuru")	Fuji TV	Satsuki Nonomura	Hiroyuki Sanada
8/27/1999	True Horror Stories: That Summer's Visitor	Fuji TV	Shōko Morii	Yōsuke Kubozuka, Kazuko Yoshiyuki
12/30/2001	Meoto Manzai	TBS	Nobuko Tsujimoto	Etsushi Toyokawa (dir.), Masahiro Kōmoto, Tatsuo Nadaka, Adeyto
3/20/2012	Dorama Tokubetsu Kikaku: Shūchaku-eki – Twilight Express no Koi	TBS	Chie Takatsu	Kōichi Satō, Hiroko Nakajima, Sae Shimizu, Chieko Ichikawa, Midori Kimura
6/25/2013	Shiawase ni naru Mittsu no Kaimono: Manshon o Katta Onna	Kansai TV	Mutsumi Ando	Reika Kirishima, Tasuku Emoto, Yutaka Matsushige
3/29/2017	Special Drama: Seichō Matsumoto, A Barren Forest	TV Tokyo	Miyuki Etō	Noriyuki Higashiyama, Yukiyoshi Ozawa, Saki Aibu
10/14/2017	Tales of the Unusual: Fall 2017 Special Edition – "Freestyle Mom"	Fuji TV	Fusako Hosokawa	Yosuke Asari, Serai Takagi, Seikō Itō
4/19/2018	The Woman of Unresolved Mystery: Women Document Detectives	TV Asahi	Izumi Shimano	Kyōka Suzuki, Haru, Kenichi Endō, Junji Takada, Asuka Kudo
5/18/2019	Confidence Man JP Special: Unsei-hen	Fuji TV	Wakaba Watanabe	Masami Nagasawa, Masahiro Higashide, Fumiyo Kohinata, Kazuki Kitamura, Ryōko Hirosue
11/23/2019	The Tragedy of W	NHK BS Premium	Yoshie Watsuji	Tao Tsuchiya, Rie Mimura, Shinya Owada, Mari Natsuki, Kenichi Okamoto

==== Kōhaku Uta Gassen appearances ====
Year / broadcast	Appearance number	Song	Appearance order	Contender	Notes
1988 (Shōwa 63) / 39th	Debut	"Witches"	1/21	Hikaru Genji	
1989 (Heisei 1) / 40th	2	"Virgin Eyes"	10/27	Otokogumi	
1990 (Heisei 2) / 41st	3	"Aishiterutte Iwanai!"	2/29	Eisaku Yoshida	
1991 (Heisei 3) / 42nd	4	"Rosa"	3/28	Eisaku Yoshida	
1992 (Heisei 4) / 43rd	5	"Sekaijū no Dare Yori Kitto" (with Wands)	10/28	Shonentai	Also performed a cover of "Candy Candy" with Chisato Moritaka and Hikaru Nishida.
1993 (Heisei 5) / 44th	6	"Shiawase ni Naru Tame ni"	14/26	Shonentai	
1994 (Heisei 6) / 45th	7	"Tada Nakitaku Naru no"	8/25	Fumiya Fujii	

== Bibliography ==
- Issho Kenmei Nakayama Miho Photo Collection (1985, Wani Books) - Photo CollectionIssho Kenmei Nakayama Miho Photo Collection. Wani Books. 1985. ISBN 9784847020247.
- Toumei de Iru Yo, Meippai Onna no Ko (1985, Wani Books) - Essay CollectionToumei de Iru Yo, Meippai Onna no Ko. Wani Books. 1985. ISBN 4847010310.
- Miho Ganbaru (1986, Shueisha) - Photo CollectionMiho Ganbaru. Shueisha. 1986.
- Docchi ni Suru no. (1989, Shueisha) - Photo CollectionDocchi ni Suru no. Shueisha. 1989.
- Ambivalence Nakayama Miho Shashinshu (1989, Wani Books) - Photo CollectionMysterious Book. Wani Books. 1901.
- SCENA miho nakayama pictorial (1991, Wani Books) - Photo CollectionAmbivalence Nakayama Miho Shashinshu. Wani Books. 1991.
- P.S. I LOVE YOU (1991, Nippon Hassou Shuppan and Fusosha Publishing) - Essay CollectionP.S. I LOVE YOU. Fusosha Publishing. 1991.
- LETTERS in Love Letter (Nakayama Miho Photo Collection) (1995, Wani Books) - Photo CollectionLETTERS in Love Letter. Wani Books. 1995.
- Nakayama Miho in Eiga Tokyo Biyori (1997, Wani Books) - Photo CollectionNakayama Miho in Eiga Tokyo Biyori. Wani Books. 1997.
- Atashi to Watashi (1997, Gentosha) - NovelMiho Nakayama (1997). Atashi to Watashi. Gentosha.
- ANGEL (1998, Wani Books) - Photo CollectionANGEL. Wani Books. 1998.
- Nazenara Yasashii Machi ga Atta Kara (2009, Shueisha) - Photo Essay Collection

Preceded by Yukiko Okada	Japan Record Award for Best New Artist; 1985	Succeeded by Shonentai
