= Deen (band) discography =

- Studio albums: 22
- EPs: 4
- Live albums: 2
- Compilation albums: 7
- Tribute albums: 3
- Singles: 46
- B-sides: 2
- Video albums: 20
- Music videos: 3

The discography of Deen, a Japanese popular music band, consists of twenty-two studio albums and forty-six singles.

== Studio albums ==
Year	Album details	Oricon peak
1994	Deen: Released: September 14, 1994; Label: B-Gram Records (BGCH-1012); Format: CD	1
1996	I Wish: Released: September 9, 1996; Label: B-Gram Records (JBCJ-1011); Format: CD	2
1998	The Day: Released: December 16, 1998; Label: Berg label (BVCR-11006); Format: CD	9
2000	'Need love: Released: May 24, 2000; Label: Berg label (BVCR-11021); Format: CD	10
2002	Pray: Released: November 20, 2002; Label: Berg label (BVCR-11045); Format: CD	12
2003	Utopia: Released: November 5, 2003; Label: BMG Funhouse (BVCR-11057); Format: CD	20
2004	Road Cruisin': Released: August 18, 2004; Label: BMG Funhouse (BVCR-18034/5); Format: CD, CD+DVD	13
2006	Diamonds: Released: October 11, 2006; Label: BGM Japan (BVCR-18077/8); Format: CD, CD+DVD	20
2009	Deen Next Stage: Released: February 25, 2009; Label: BGM Japan (BVCR-18166/7); Format: CD, CD+DVD	16
2009	Lovers Concerto: Released: December 2, 2009; Label: Ariola Japan (BVCL-20017/8); Format: CD, CD+DVD	21
2010	Crawl: Released: August 9, 2010; Label: Ariola Japan (BVCL-112/3); Format: CD, CD+DVD	23
2011	Graduation: Released: June 15, 2011; Label: Ariola Japan (BVCL-215/7); Format: CD, CD+DVD	19
2012	Marriage: Released: August 8, 2012; Label: Ariola Japan (BVCL-357/9); Format: CD, CD+DVD	23
2013	Circle: Released: December 18, 2013; Label: Epic Records Japan (ESCL-4140/1); Format: CD, CD+DVD	21
2015	Zenkai Koigokoro!! ~Missing you~: Released: July 29, 2015; Label: Epic Records Japan (ESCL-4483/4); Format: CD, CD+DVD	23
2016	Butterfly: Released: June 1, 2016; Label: Epic Records Japan (ESCL-4631/2); Format: CD, CD+DVD	18
2017	Parade: Released: August 9, 2017; Label: Epic Records Japan; Format: CD, CD+DVD, CD+BD	22
2019	NewJourney: Released: March 13, 2019; Label: Epic Records Japan; Format: CD, CD+DVD, CD+BD	22
2021	Twilight In City: For Lovers Only: Released: July 7, 2021; Label: Epic Records Japan; Format: CD	6
2021	Spur: Released: December 22, 2021; Label: Epic Records Japan; Format: CD	49
2024	Dance in City: For Groovers Only: Released: January 10, 2024; Label: Epic Records Japan; Format: CD	18
2025	Rock On!: Released: January 22, 2025; Label: Epic Records Japan; Format: CD	20

== Live albums ==
Year	Album details	Oricon peak
2008	DEEN at Budoukan-15th Anniversary Greatest Singles Live-: Released: September 3, 2008; Label: BMG Japan (BVCR-18147~8); Format: CD	32
2010	All Time Live Best: Released: November 24, 2010; Label: Ariola Japan (BVCL-141~144; BVCL-145~146); Format: CD, CD+DVD	41

== Compilation albums ==
Year	Album details	Oricon Peak
1998	DEEN Singles +1: Released: March 18, 1998; Label: B-Gram Records (JBCJ-1018); Format: CD	1
2001	Ballads in Blue: The greatest hits of Deen: Released: June 6, 2001; Label: Berg label (BVCR-11030); Format: CD	7
2007	Deen The Best Classics: Released: December 19, 2007; Label: BMG Japan (BVCR-18110~1),(BVCR-18112~4); Format: CD	28
2008	Deen Perfect Singles+: Released: June 4, 2008; Label: BMG Japan (BVCR-18132~3),(BVCR-18134~6); Format: CD, CD+DVD	11
2013	Deenage Memory ~20 Shuunen Kinen Best Album~: Released: March 13, 2013; Label: Ariola Japan (BVCL-500~503),(BVCL-504~506); Format: CD, CD+DVD	20
2018	DEEN The Best FOREVER Complete Singles+: Released: February 28, 2018; Label: Epic Records Japan (ESCL-4993～96),(ESCL-4988～92); Format: CD, CD+Premium Disc	11
2019	Ballads in Love: The Greatest Love Songs of Deen: Released: November 6, 2019; Label: Epic Records Japan; Format: CD	21
2023	Deen the Best DX: Basic to Respect: Released: March 8, 2023; Label: Epic Records Japan; Format: 3×CD	12

== B-Side albums ==
Year	Album details	Oricon Peak
2010	Another Side Memories~Precious Best~: Released: November 24, 2010; Label: B-Gram Records (JBCJ-9035~6),(JBCJ-9037~8); Format: CD, CD+DVD	35
2016	Another Side Memories~Precious Best II~: Released: December 21, 2016; Label: Epic Records Japan (ESCL-4779~80),(ESCL-4781); Format: CD, CD+DVD	51

== Cover albums ==
Year	Album details	Oricon Peak
2002	Waon -Songs for children-: Released: March 6, 2002; Label: Berg Label (JBCJ-1018); Format: CD	25
2005	Deen The Best Kiseki: Released: November 23, 2005; Label: BMG Japan (BVCR-18056~7),(BVCR-11077); Format: CD	10
2014	Kimi ga Iru Natsu -Everlasting Summer-: Released: June 1, 2014; Label: Epic Records Japan (ESCL-4215〜6),(ESCL-4217); Format: CD, CD+DVD	19
2021	Pop In City: For covers only: Released: January 20, 2021; Label: Epic Records Japan; Format: CD, CD+DVD	33

== EPs ==
Year	Album details	Oricon Peak
1999	Classics One White Christmas time: Released: November 25, 1999; Label: Berg label (BVCR-19016); Format: CD	18
2000	Classics Two Sepia Akizakura ~more & more~: Released: September 13, 2000; Label: Berg label (BVCR-19025); Format: CD	16
2007	Classics Three Paste Yume no Tsubomi: Released: April 25, 2007; Label: BMG Japan (BVCR-19994); Format: CD	29
2007	Classics Four Blue Smile Blue: Released: August 22, 2007; Label: BMG Japan (BVCR-19097~8),(BVCR-19096); Format: CD	30

== Singles ==
Year	Single details	Oricon peak	Album
1993	Kono mama Kimi Dake wo Ubaisaritai (このまま君だけを奪い去りたい): Released: 1993/3/10; Label: B-Gram Records; Format: CD	2	Deen
1993	Tsubasa wo Hirogete (翼を広げて): Released: 1993/7/17; Label: B-Gram Records; Format: CD	5	DEEN Singles +1
1993	Memories: Released: 1993/9/22; Label: B-Gram Records; Format: CD	4	Deen
1993	Eien wo Azukete kure (永遠をあずけてくれ): Released: 1993/11/28; Label: B-Gram Records; Format: CD	3	Deen
1994	Hitomi Sorasanaide (瞳そらさないで): Released: 1994/6/22; Label: B-Gram Records; Format: CD	1	Deen
1995	Teenage Dream: Released: 1995/3/27; Label: B-Gram Records; Format: CD	2	I Wish
1995	Mirai no Tame ni (未来のために): Released: 1995/6/19; Label: B-Gram Records; Format: CD	1	DEEN Singles +1
1995	Love Forever/Shounen (LOVE FOREVER/少年): Released: 1995/12/11; Label: B-Gram Records; Format: CD	4	I wish
1996	Hitori ja Nai (ひとりじゃない): Released: 1996/04/15; Label: B-Gram Records; Format: CD	3	I wish
1996	Sunshine on Summer Time: Released: 1996/07/1; Label: B-Gram Records; Format: CD	10	I wish
1996	Sugao de Waratteitai (素顔で笑っていたい): Released: 1996/08/5; Label: B-Gram Records; Format: CD	8	I wish
1997	Kimi ga Inai Natsu (君がいない夏): Released: 1997/08/27; Label: B-Gram Records; Format: CD	10	DEEN Singles +1
1997	Yume de Aru You ni (夢であるように): Released: 1997/12/17; Label: B-Gram Records; Format: CD	13	DEEN Singles +1
1998	Tooi Sora de (遠い空で): Released: 1998/02/18; Label: B-Gram Records; Format: CD	18	DEEN Singles +1
1998	Kimi Sae Ireba (君さえいれば): Release: 1998/05/27; Label: B-Gram Records; Format: CD	11	The Day
1998	Tegotae no Nai Ai (手ごたえのない愛): Released: 1998/11/18; Label: Berg label; Format: CD	13	The Day
1999	Tooi Tooi Mirai he (遠い遠い未来へ): Released: 1999/03/25; Label: Berg label; Format: CD	22	DEEN PERFECT SINGLES+
1999	Just One: Released: 1999/07/23; Label: Berg label; Format: CD	19	'Need love
1999	My Love: Released: 1999/11/3; Label: Berg label; Format: CD	21	'Need love
2000	Power of Love: Released: 2000/04/19; Label: Berg label; Format: CD	18	'Need love
2000	Kanashimi no Nukou Gawa (哀しみの向こう側): Released: 2000/11/15; Label: Berg label; Format: CD	20	DEEN PERFECT SINGLES +
2002	Miagete Goran Yoru no Hoshi wo (見上げてごらん夜の星を): Released: 2002/01/30; Label: Berg label; Format: CD	18	Deenage Memory -20th Anniversary Best Album-
2002	Yume de Aetara (夢で逢えたら): Released: 2002/05/22; Label: Berg label; Format: CD	44	Deenage Memory -20th Anniversary Best Album-
2002	Birthday eve ~Dare Yori mo Hayai Ai no Uta~ (Birthday eve 〜誰よりも早い愛の歌〜): Released: 2002/10/2; Label: Berg label; Format: CD	11	Pray
2003	Tsubasa wo Kaze ni Nosete -fly away- (翼を風に乗せて〜fly away〜): Released: 2003/04/2; Label: Berg label; Format: CD	7	Utopia
2003	Taiyou no Hanabira (太陽と花びら): Released: 2003/08/13; Label: BMG Funhouse; Format: CD	20	Utopia
2003	Utopia wa Mieteru noni (ユートピアは見えてるのに): Released: 2003/10/1; Label: BMG Funhouse; Format: CD	10	Utopia
2004	Rail no Nai Sora he (レールのない空へ): Released: 2004/04/28; Label: BMG Funhouse; Format: CD, CD+DVD	18	Road Cruisin'
2004	Strong Soul: Released: 2004/06/30; Label: BMG Funhouse; Format: CD, CD+DVD	14	Road Cruisin'
2004	Ai no Kane ga Sekai ni Hibikimasu you ni (愛の鐘が世界に響きますように…): Released: 2004/12/22; Label: BMG Funhouse; Format: CD	18	DEEN PERFECT SINGLES+
2005	Kono Mama Kimi Dake wo Ubaisaritai/Tsubasa wo Hirogete (このまま君だけを奪い去りたい/翼を広げて): Released: 2005/10/26; Label: BMG Japan; Format: CD	9	Deen The Best Kiseki
2006	Starting Over: Released: 2006/05/24; Label: BMG Japan; Format: CD, CD+DVD	22	Diamonds
2006	Diamond (ダイヤモンド): Released: 2006/08/2; Label: BMG Japan; Format: CD, CD+DVD	26	Diamonds
2008	Eien no Ashita (永遠の明日): Released: 2008/12/10; Label: BMG Japan; Format: CD, CD+DVD	9	Deen Next Stage
2009	Celebrate: Released: 2009/04/29; Label: BMG Japan; Format: CD, CD+DVD	15	Lovers Concerto
2009	Negai feat. Mizuno Mari (Negai feat. ミズノマリ): Released: 2009/11/04; Label: Ariola Japan; Format: CD, CD+DVD	23	Lovers Concerto
2010	coconuts feat. kokomo: Released: 2010/07/14; Label: Ariola Japan; Format: CD, CD+DVD	14	Crawl
2011	Brand New Wing: Released: 2011/04/6; Label: Ariola Japan; Format: CD, CD+DVD	18	Graduation
2012	Kokoro kara Kimi ga Suki ~Marriage~ (心から君が好き〜マリアージュ〜): Released: 2012/07/27; Label: Ariola Japan; Format: CD, CD+DVD	22	Marriage
2013	Hatachi/Ame no Roppongi (二十歳/雨の六本木): Released: 2013/08/7; Label: Ariola Japan; Format: CD, CD+DVD	27	Circle
2013	Mou Nakanaide (もう泣かないで): Released: 2013/11/27; Label: Epic Records Japan; Format: CD, CD+DVD	36	Circle
2014	Kimi ga Boku wo Wasurenai you ni Boku ga Kimi wo Oboeteiru (君が僕を忘れないように 僕が君をおぼえている): Released: 2014/10/1; Label: Epic Records Japan; Format: CD, CD+DVD	19	Zenkai Koigokoro!! ~Missing you~
2015	Sen Kai Koigokoro! (千回恋心): Released: 2015/06/24; Label: Epic Records Japan; Format: CD, CD+DVD	18	Zenkai Koigokoro!! ~Missing you~
2015	Zutto Tsutaetakatta I love you (ずっと伝えたかった I love you): Released: 2015/10/7; Label: Epic Records Japan; Format: CD, CD+DVD	18	Parade
2016	Kioku no Kage/Asobi ni Ikou! (記憶の影/遊びにいこう): Released: 2016/11/2; Label: Epic Records Japan; Format: CD, CD+DVD	28	DEEN The Best FOREVER Complete Singles+
2017	Kimi e no Parade♪ (君へのパレード♪): Released: 2017/5/24; Label: Epic Records Japan; Format: CD, CD+DVD	20	Parade
2019	Mirai Kara no Hikari (ミライからの光): Released: 2019/2/6; Label: Epic Records Japan; Format: CD, CD+DVD	25	NewJourney
2022	The Last Journey: 47 no Tobira (47の扉): Released: 2022/06/29; Label: Epic Records Japan; Format: CD, CD+DVD	26	-

=== Digital singles ===
Year	Single	Reference
2018	"Aloha""	
2018	"Hitomi Sorasanaide:Jawaiian Style"	
2018	"Power of Love:Jawaiian Style"	
2020	"Soba bi iru dake de"	
2020	"Machigainai Sekai'"	
2022	"Mirror Ball"	

== Video albums DVD ==
Year	Album details	Oricon peak
2001	DEEN Live Joy Special Yokohama Arena: Released: 2001/6/6; Label: Berg label (BVBR-11005)	36
2001	On&Off -tour document of 'need love-: Released: 2001/6/6; Label: Berg label (BVBR-11006)	22
2002	On&Off -document of unplugged live&recordings-: Released: 2002/11/20; Label: Berg label (BVBR-11016)	50
2004	One Day Live '04-END of Summer- & 6Clips: Released: 2004/12/22; Label: BMG Funhouse (BVBR-11045)	68
2006	Best of DEEN Kiseki - Live Complete: Released: 2006/5/24; Label: BMG Japan (BVBR-11069)	38
2007	DEEN Live Joy Complete 2006-2007 - Premium Edition: Released: 2007/4/25; Label: BMG Japan (BVBR-11081~2)	51
2008	DEEN Live Joy 2007-2008 -Japan Road 47+6- - Limited Edition: Released: 2008/5/21; Label: BMG Japan (BVBR-11105~7)	37
2008	DEEN at Budokan "No Cut" -15th Anniversary Perfect Singles Live-: Released: 2008/12/10; Label: BMG Japan (BVBR-11117~8)	27
2009	DEEN at Budokan 2009 -Live Joy Special-: Released: 2009/10/28; Label: Ariola Japan (BVBL-11~2)	29
2011	DEEN at Budokan 2010 -Live Joy Special-: Released: 2011/4/27; Label: Ariola Japan (BVBL-58~9)	56
2011	DEEN at Budokan 2011 -Live Joy Special-: Released: 2011/12/21; Label: Ariola Japan (BVBL-66~8)	88
2013	DEEN Live History -20th Anniversary-: Released: 2013/3/13; Label: Epic Records Japan (JBBS-5007)	25
2013	DEEN Japan Road 47-Kizuna-: Released: 2013/7/10; Label: Epic Records Japan (JBBS-5007)	53
2014	DEEN at Budokan -20th Anniversary- - Day One: Released: 2014/2/26; Label: Epic Records Japan (ESBL-2354~5)	14
2014	DEEN at Budokan -20th Anniversary- - Day Two: Released: 2014/2/26; Label: Epic Records Japan (ESBL-2356~7)	15
2014	DEEN at Budokan 2014 Live Joy Special: Released: 2014/12/24; Label: Epic Records Japan (ESBL-2382~3)	128
2016	DEEN at Budokan 2015 Live Joy Special: Released: 2016/02/24; Label: Epic Records Japan (ESXL-81/3)	97
2017	DEEN at Budokan 2016 Live Joy Special -Ballad Night-: Released: 2017/03/22; Label: Epic Records Japan (ESXL-113/5)	95
2017	DEEN Japan Parade 47-Kizuna-: Released: 2017/12/27; Label: Epic Records Japan (ESBL-2501)	70
2018	DEEN at Budokan Forever - 25th Anniversary -: Released: 2018/06/20; Label: Epic Records Japan (ESBL-2529)	17
2018	DEEN LIVE JOY-COUNTDOWN SPECIAL: Solo! Solo!! Solo!!!: Released: 2018/12/26; Label: Epic Records Japan	48
2019	DEEN LIVE JOY COMPLETE: Sun and Moon: Released: 2019/08/21; Label: Epic Records Japan	36
2020	DEEN PREMIUM LIVE AOR NIGHT CRUISIN’: Released: 2020/03/25; Label: Epic Records Japan	67
2020	DEEN LIVE JOY 2020: All your request!!: Released: 2020/11/25; Label: Epic Records Japan	22
2021	DEEN LIVE IN CITY 2021: City Pop Chronicle: Released: 2021/11/10; Label: Epic Records Japan	-
2022	DEEN The Live 2022: Hot mirror ball & Spur night: Released: 2022/10/05; Label: Epic Records Japan	-
2023	The Last Journey 47: Tobira (Tour documentary film): Released: 2023/01/25; Label: Epic Records Japan	-
2023	DEEN at BUDOKAN DX: 30th Anniversary: Released: 2023/08/23; Label: Epic Records Japan	10

== Video Albums Blu-Ray ==
Year	Album details	Oricon peak
2014	DEEN at Budoukan 〜20th Anniversary〜 <COMPLETE>: Released: 2014/2/26; Label: Epic Records Japan (ESXL-37/8)	6
2014	DEEN at Budokan 2014 Live Joy Special: Released: 2014/12/24; Label: Epic Records Japan (ESXL-49/1)	66
2016	DEEN at Budokan 2015 Live Joy Special: Released: 2016/02/24; Label: Epic Records Japan (ESXL-81/3)	51
2017	DEEN at Budokan 2016 Live Joy Special -Ballad Night-: Released: 2017/03/22; Label: Epic Records Japan (ESXL-113/5)	53
2017	DEEN Japan Parade 47-Kizuna-: Released: 2017/12/27; Label: Epic Records Japan (ESXL-130/1)	32
2018	DEEN at Budokan Forever - 25th Anniversary -: Released: 2018/06/20; Label: Epic Records Japan (ESXL-146/8)	10
2018	DEEN LIVE JOY-COUNTDOWN SPECIAL: Solo! Solo!! Solo!!!: Released: 2018/12/26; Label: Epic Records Japan	48
2019	DEEN LIVE JOY COMPLETE: Sun and Moon: Released: 2019/08/21; Label: Epic Records Japan	36
2020	DEEN PREMIUM LIVE AOR NIGHT CRUISIN’: Released: 2020/03/25; Label: Epic Records Japan	67
2020	DEEN LIVE JOY 2020: All your request!!: Released: 2020/11/25; Label: Epic Records Japan	22
2021	DEEN LIVE IN CITY 2021: City Pop Chronicle: Released: 2021/11/10; Label: Epic Records Japan	-
2022	DEEN The Live 2022: Hot mirror ball & Spur night: Released: 2022/10/05; Label: Epic Records Japan	-
2023	The Last Journey 47: Tobira (Tour documentary film): Released: 2023/01/25; Label: Epic Records Japan	-
2023	DEEN at BUDOKAN DX: 30th Anniversary: Released: 2023/08/23; Label: Epic Records Japan	10

== Music video ==
Year	Album details	Oricon Peak
2003	DEEN The Greatest Clips 1993-1998: Released: 2003/4/2; Label: J-DISC Being (ONBD-7025)	16
2003	DEEN The Greatest Clips 1998-2002: Released: 2003/4/2; Label: Berg label (BVBR-11019)	20
2014	THE GREATEST CLIPS 2008-2013: Released: 2014/10/1; Label: Epic Records Japan (ESBL-2373)	19
2014	THE GREATEST CLIPS 2014-2017: Released: 2018/07/18; Label: Epic Records Japan (ESBL-2373)	60
