= 胡蝶 =

胡蝶 or 蝴蝶, meaning "Butterfly"/"Butterflies", may refer to:

- "Butterflies" (蝴蝶), song in the album Angst by Canadian-Taiwanese pop singer Patrick Brasca
- Butterfly (2004 film) (蝴蝶), Hong Kong drama film
- Butterfly (constituency), constituency in the Tuen Mun District
- Hu Die (胡蝶; 1907 or 1908–1989), Chinese actress
- Hu Die (TV host) (胡蝶; born 1983), Chinese television hostess
- "Isabellae" (蝴蝶), song in the album Black Cab by Masiwei, Melo and Psy.P
- Shinobu Kocho (胡蝶 忍), character in the anime and manga series Demon Slayer: Kimetsu no Yaiba
- Soul of a Demon (蝴蝶), 2007 Taiwanese film
- Wu Dip (胡蝶), character in the Hong Kong television drama Karma Rider
- "蝴蝶", song in the album Lovers & Strangers by Faye Wong

== See also ==
- Butterflies (disambiguation)
- Butterfly (disambiguation)
- Chocho
- Kocho
