= Butterflies (disambiguation) =

Butterflies are flying insects.

Butterflies may also refer to:

== Film, television and theatre ==
- Butterflies (1993 film), an Indian Malayalam film
- Butterflies (2009 film), a documentary
- Butterflies (2018 film), a Turkish film
- Butterflies (TV series), a British series starring Wendy Craig and Geoffrey Palmer
- Butterflies (Bluey), an episode of the Australian animated television series Bluey
- The Butterflies (play), an 1894 American play

== Music ==
- The Butterflys, a 1960s-era group signed to Red Bird Records

=== Albums ===
- Butterflies (Basia album), 2018
- Butterflies (Bump of Chicken album), 2016

=== Songs ===
- "Butterflies" (3+2 song), 2010
- "Butterflies" (AJ Tracey song), 2018
- "Butterflies" (Justin Bieber song), 2025
- "Butterflies" (Kacey Musgraves song), 2018
- "Butterflies" (Michael Jackson song), 2001
- "Butterflies" (Patti Page song), 1953
- "Butterflies" (Skrillex, Starrah and Four Tet song), 2021
- "Butterflies" (Tone Damli song), 2009
- "Butterflies", by 24kGoldn from the 2021 album El Dorado
- "Butterflies", by All Time Low from the 2025 album Everyone's Talking!
- "Butterflies", by Baker Boy from the 2021 album Gela
- "butterflies.", by Brent Faiyaz from the 2026 album Icon
- "Butterflies", by Gabbie Hanna from the 2019 album 2WayMirror
- "Butterflies", by Gayle from the 2023 album Barbie the Album
- "Butterflies", by Hearts2Hearts from the 2025 single album The Chase
- "Butterflies", by Juliana Hatfield from the 2010 album Peace & Love
- "Butterflies" by Jvke featuring Taehyun and Kim Chaewon, 2025
- "Butterflies", by Max & Ali Gatie, 2021
- "Butterflies", by Medina from the 2012 album Forever
- "Butterflies", by Minipop from the 2007 album A New Hope
- "Butterflies", by Nayeon from the 2024 extended play Na
- "Butterflies", by Red Velvet from the 2018 extended play RBB
- "Butterflies", by Sia from the 2004 album Colour the Small One
- "Butterflies", by Zendaya from her 2013 self-titled debut album Zendaya

== Other uses ==
- Butterflies (Mexico City), a defunct gay club in the city
- Butterflies (Van Gogh series), an 1889-1890 painting series by Van Gogh
- The Butterflies (horse) (foaled 1892), an American National Champion Thoroughbred racemare, winner of the 1894 Futurity Stakes

== See also ==
- Butterfly (disambiguation)
- Butterflies in the stomach, an English expression
- Good-byes and Butterflies, 1970 album by Five Man Electrical Band
- Mirabal sisters, or "Las Mariposas" ("the Butterflies"), Dominican political dissidents active in the 1960s
- 胡蝶 (disambiguation)
