= Koco =

Koco can refer to:

- KOCO-TV, television station in Oklahoma City, Oklahoma, U.S.
- Koço, Albanian masculine given name
- Kočo, Macedonian masculine given name
- Koco Caine (born 1995), American drag queen

== See also ==
- Trigo koço, dessert
- Coco (disambiguation)
- Koko (disambiguation)
