= Ballads in Love: The Greatest Love Songs of Deen =

Studio album by Deen
- Released: 6 November 2019
- Recorded: 2019
- Genre: Japanese pop
- Length: 48:40
- Label: Epic Records Japan
- Producer: DEEN

Deen chronology
| NewJourney (2019) | Ballads in Love: The Greatest Love Songs of Deen (2019) | Pop in City: For Covers Only (2021) |

Ballads in Love: The Greatest Love Songs of Deen is the third self-cover album by Japanese pop band Deen. It was released on 6 November 2019 under the Epic Records Japan label. It's their second self-cover album for the first time in 14 years. The track list is based on the final results of the online inquiry, filled by the fans. The tracks are completely new recorded with the new string and piano arrangements.

This album was released in regular and the first press limited edition. The limited edition includes the second disc with the instrumental versions of the track lists from the first disc. Both of them includes one special bonus live track from the live sessions.

== Commercial performance ==
The album reached #21 in its first week and charted for 4 weeks.

== Track listing ==
All lyrics are written by Shuuichi Ikemori (except #3, with co-help of Daria Kawashima) and #4, by Wesugi Show and #5 by Miho Komatsu).

| No. | Title | Music | Arranger(s) | Length |
|---|---|---|---|---|
| 1. | "My Love: Introduction" (Instrumental) | | Yuto | 4:41 |
| 2. | "Yume de Aruyouni (夢であるように)" (Parade Style) | DEEN | Yuto | 4:58 |
| 3. | "Mou Nakanaide (もう泣かないで)" | Yamane | Yuto | 3:21 |
| 4. | "Kono Mama Kimi Dake wo Ubaisaritai (このまま君だけを奪い去りたい)" | Oda Tetsuro | Yuto | 4:48 |
| 5. | "Kimi ga Inai Natsu (君がいない夏)" | Miho Komatsu | Yuto | 4:53 |
| 6. | "Kimi no Kokoro ni Kaeritai (君の心に帰りたい)" | Yamane | Yuto | 3:47 |
| 7. | "Celebrate" | Yamane | Yuto | 4:14 |
| 8. | "Hoshi no Shizuku (星の雫)" | Yamane | Yuto | 3:09 |
| 9. | "Kokoro Kara Kimi ga Suki: Marriage (心から君が好き ～マリアージュ～)" | Yamane | Yuto | 4:12 |
| 10. | "Blue Eyes" | Yamane | Yuto | 5:26 |
| 11. | "My Love" | Yamane | Yuto | 4:26 |
| 12. | "Goban Machi no Serenāde (Billboard Live TOKYO 20190727)" (bonus track in the regular edition) | Yamane | Yuto | 4:26 |
