= The Butterfly Album =

The Butterfly Album may refer to:

- The House of Love (1990 album)
- Stone Temple Pilots (2018 album)

== See also ==
- Butterfly (disambiguation)#Albums
