= Kocho =

Kocho may refer to:

== Fictional characters ==
- Kanae Kocho (胡蝶 カナエ), a character in the anime and manga series Demon Slayer: Kimetsu no Yaiba
- Shinobu Kocho (胡蝶 しのぶ), a character in the anime and manga series Demon Slayer: Kimetsu no Yaiba
- Kocho Wang, character in Boarding School Juliet

== Other uses ==
- Kōchō (弘長), a Japanese era name
- Kocho Angjushev, Macedonian businessman
- Kocho (food), a staple food in Ethiopia
- Kocho, Iraq, a village in Sindar District, Iraq

== See also ==
- Kochoki (胡蝶綺 〜若き信長〜), an anime television series
- 胡蝶 (disambiguation)
