= Deen Singles +1 =

DEEN Singles +1

Greatest hits album by Deen
- Released: 18 March 1998
- Recorded: 1993–1998
- Genre: Japanese pop
- Length: 69 minutes
- Label: B-Gram Records
- Producer: BMF

Deen chronology
I Wish (1995)	DEEN Singles +1 (1998)	The Day (1998)

DEEN Singles +1 is the first greatest hits album by Japanese pop-rock band Deen. It was released on 18 March 1998 under B-Gram Records label. Album includes all singles by chronological release. Some singles are included for the first time on the album, such as "Tsubasa wo Hiroget", "Mirai no Tameni", "Yume de Aru you ni", "Tooi Sora de" or "Kimi ga Inai Natsu". A bonus track is included as well. The album reached #1 in its first week and charted for 18 weeks, selling more than 781,000 copies. It's the last album being released under B-Gram Records agency and moving into Berg label.

== Track listing ==
No.	Title	Lyrics	Music	Arrangers	Length
1.	"Kono Mama Kimi dake wo Ubaisaritai" (このまま君だけを奪い去りたい, 1st single)	Show Wesugi	Tetsurō Oda	Takeshi Hayama	4:11
2.	"Tsubasa wo Hirogete" (翼を広げて, 2nd single)	Izumi Sakai	Tetsurō Oda	Takeshi Hayama	5:14
3.	"Memories" (3rd single)	Shuuichi Ikemori	Tetsurō Oda	Takeshi Hayama	4:30
4.	"Eien wo Azuketekure" (永遠をあずけてくれ, 4th single)	Daria Kawashima	Seiichiro Kuribayashi	Takeshi Hayama	4:57
5.	"Hitomi Sorasanaide" (瞳そらさないで, 5th single)	Izumi Sakai	Tetsurō Oda	Takeshi Hayama	4:42
6.	"Teenage Dream" (6th single)	Izumi Sakai	Seiichiro Kuribayashi	Takeshi Hayama	4:38
7.	"Mirai no Tameni" (未来のために, 7th single)	Shuuichi Ikemori	Shuuichi Ikemori, Naoki Uzumoto	Hirohito Furui	4:41
8.	"Love Forever" (8th single)	Yuri Yamamoto	Shinji Tagawa	Takeshi Hayama	4:32
9.	"Hitori Janai" (ひとりじゃない, 9th single)	Shuuichi Ikemori	Tetsurō Oda	Hirohito Furui	4:00
10.	"Sunshine On Summer Time" (10th single)	Shuuichi Ikemori	Naoki Uzumoto	Hirohito Furui	4:18
11.	"Egao de Waratteitai" (素顔で笑っていたい, 11th single)	Shuuichi Ikemori	Tetsurō Oda	Daisuke Ikeda	4:20
12.	"Kimi ga Inai Natsu" (君がいない夏, 12th single)	Miho Komatsu	Miho Komatsu	Daisuke Ikeda	4:23
13.	"Yume de Aru you ni" (夢であるように, 13th single)	Shuuichi Ikemori	Deen	Daisuke Ikeda	4:40
14.	"Tooi Sora de" (遠い空で, 14th single)	Miho Komatsu	Miho Komatsu, Kazuo Yoshie	Daisuke Ikeda	4:39
15.	"Gin Iro no Yume -All over the world-" (銀色の夢 〜All over the world〜, bonus track)	Shuuichi Ikemori	Koji Yamane	Daisuke Ikeda	4:28
