= Kono Mama Kimi Dake wo Ubaisaritai =

Single by Deen

from the album Deen
- Released: March 10, 1993
- Genre: Pop rock, J-pop
- Label: B-Gram Records
- Songwriters: Show Uesugi, Tetsurō Oda
- Producer: Daiko Nagato

Deen singles chronology
"Kono Mama Kimi Dake wo Ubaisaritai" (1993)	"Tsubasa wo Hirogete" (1993)

Kono Mama Kimi Dake wo Ubaisaritai (このまま君だけを奪い去りたい) is the debut single by Japanese rock band Deen. The single was released on 10 March 1993 under B-Gram Records label. It served as a commercial song to NTT DoCoMo commercials. The single debuted at number 2 and remained on number 12 the yearly Oricon charts for 1993 and was certificated with the RIAJ's Golden Disc.

== Background ==
A-side track has been written by Tetsurō Oda and Show Wesugi from the band Wands, while the B.-side track has been written by vocalist himself, Shuuichi Ikemori and arranged by Kousuke Ohshima, who is also member of the band Wands.

B-side track Dreamin has been recorded for the first time in December 1992 and included in the soundtrack album Woman Dream from the Japanese television drama series Woman Dream. In the personnel he's credit as a soloist Shuuichi Ikeda, without knowing himself he'll become the vocalist of the band later. Soundtrack version has slower tempo and no vibrato in the beginning.

== Commercial performance ==
The single debuted at number 2, charted for twenty-four weeks and selling 1,293,240 copies. It remained on number 12 the yearly Oricon charts for 1993. The single was certificated with the RIAJ's Golden Disc in 1993.

In the history of Japanese pop music, they've become first Japanese artist to break record with million sold copies of debut album and debut single at the same time.

== Track listing ==
CD single
No.	Title	Lyrics	Music	Arranger(s)	Length
1.	"Kono Mama Kimi Dake wo Ubaisaritai"	Show Uesugi	Tetsuro Oda	Takeshi Hayama	4:05
2.	"Dreamin'"	Ikeda	Shuuichi Ikeda	Kousuke Ohshima	4:09
3.	"Kono Mama Kimi Dake wo Ubaisaritai" (instrumental)	Uesugi	Oda	Hayama	5:10
4.	"Dreamin'" (instrumental)	Ikeda	Ikeda	Ohshima	4:05

== Cover ==
=== Alternative covers by Deen ===
The band rearranged this song multiple times.

In 1999, it has received acoustic arrangement under subtitle Acoustic version and was included in the concept mini album Classics One White Christmas time and later in the compilation album Deen The Best Classics.

In 2005, the single was released in a special edition Kono Mama Kimi Dake wo Ubaisaritai/Tsubasa wo Hirogete with the renewed arrangement. It was recorded in their self-cover album Deen the Kiseki, sometimes this arrangement is referred as a Kiseki version.

In 2019, it as received strings arrangement under subtitle Ballads In The Love and was recorded in the concept strings album Ballads in Love: The greatest love songs of Deen.

=== Covers by other artist ===
Show Uesugi self-cover A-side track in their second studio album Toki no Tobira and later included in the compilation album Complete Of WANDS at the BEING studio.

Tetsuro Oda self-cover covered it in his cover album Songs in 1993 and covered it once more with the different arrangement in cover album Melodies in 2006.

Daigo covered this song in his tribute album Deing in 2018 and performed with the Ikeda in the music television program FSN 2018.
