= Butterfly wings =

Butterfly wings or similar phrasings may refer to:

- Lepidoptera wings, literal sense
- butterfly effect, a proverbial illustration of the chaos-theory idea that small causes can have large effects
- Wings of a Butterfly Nebula, name for planetary nebula M2-9
- "Wings of a Butterfly", a 2005 song by HIM from the album Dark Light
- Butterfly Wings (film), a 1991 Spanish drama film
- "Butterfly Wings", a song by Machines of Loving Grace from Concentration
- "Butterfly Wings" or "Butterfly's Wings" names for Étude Op. 25, No. 9

== See also ==
- Butterfly (disambiguation)
- "Bullet with Butterfly Wings", a 1995 song by The Smashing Pumpkins from the album Mellon Collie and the Infinite Sadness
