= NewJourney =

Studio album by Deen
- Released: 13 March 2019
- Recorded: 2018–2019
- Genre: Japanese pop
- Length: 48:40
- Label: Epic Records Japan
- Producer: DEEN

Deen chronology
Deen The Best Forever Complete Singles+ (2018)	NewJourney (2019)	Ballads in Love: The Greatest Love Songs of Deen (2019)

Singles from NewJourney
- 1. "Aloha" Released: July 14, 2018; 2. "Hitomi Sorasanaide: Jawaiian Style" Released: July 21, 2018; 3. "Power of Love: Jawaiian Style" Released: July 28, 2018; 4. "Mirai Kara no Hikari" Released: February 6, 2019

NewJourney is the eighteenth studio album by Japanese pop band Deen. It was released on 3 March 2019 under the Epic Records Japan label. The album was released 1 year and 6 months after the band's 17th studio album Parade. From this album, only Yamane and Ikemori are the main members of the band. The theme of the album is "Tabi" (Journey).

This album was released in three formats: regular CD edition and limited A/B CD+DVD edition. The limited A edition includes full BD footage of their live performance Deen Live Joy Break21: Best Songs 25years. The limited B edition includes DVD with two music video clips of the Mirai Kara no Hikari and the opening footage from the game itself.

== Promotion ==
=== Singles ===
This album consist of four previously released singles.

Digital single "Aloha" was released on 14 July 2018, as the part of three weeks of consecutive digital single release. It was released several months after former member Tagawa left the band.

The next two following digital singles with subtitles Jawaiian Style are self cover versions of their 1990s-2000s hit songs, Hitomi Sorasanaide and Power of Love.

The only single released in 2019, Mirai Kara no Hikari was promoted as an theme song to the RPG game "Tales of the Rays". It officially become their third single, which was provided to the game series Tales of.

== Commercial performance ==
The album reached No. 22 in its first week and charted for 2 weeks.

== Track listing ==
All lyrics are written by Shuuichi Ikemori (except #13, by Izumi Sakai); all music is composed by Kouji Yamane (except #13, by Tetsuro Oda).

No.	Title	Arranger(s)	Length
1.	"Departure" (instrumental song)		0:31
2.	"Mirai Kara no Hikari (ミライからの光)" (47th single)	Yuto	4:58
3.	"1985"	Yuto	3:21
4.	"Kimi ga Hoshii: Sólo te quiero a ti."	Yuto	4:48
5.	"Goban Machi no Serenāde (五番街のセレナーデ)"	Shinozaki	4:53
6.	"Aloha" (album version)	Yuto	3:47
7.	"Korikancha no inori (コリカンチャの祈り)"	Shinozaki	4:14
8.	"Furusato (古里)" (instrumental)	Shinozaki	3:09
9.	"Forever Friends"	Yu Shinozaki	4:12
10.	"VIVA LA CARNIVAL"	Katsura	5:26
11.	"Aoi Hoshi (蒼星)"	Katsura	4:26
12.	"Arrival" (instrumental)		4:26
13.	"Hitomi Sorasanaide: Jawaiian Style (瞳そらさないで)" (digital single)	Naoko Katsura	4:25
14.	"Power of Love: Jawaiian Style" (digital single)	Yuto	4:20
