= Deen The Best Forever Complete Singles+ =

Greatest hits album by Deen
- Released: 28 February 2018
- Recorded: 1993–2018
- Genre: Pop rock
- Label: Epic Records Japan
- Producer: BMF

Deen chronology
Parade (2017)	Deen The Best Forever Complete Singles+ (2018)	NewJourney (2019)

Singles from DEEN The Best FOREVER Complete Singles+
- 1. "Kioku no Kage" Released: 21 November 2016

Deen The Best Forever Complete Singles+ is the sixth greatest hits album by Japanese pop rock band Deen. It released on 28 February 2018 under Epic Records Japan label.

== Background ==
The album is released as promotion for their 25th year of band debut anniversary.

Album includes complete all 46 singles by chronological releases, since their debut single "Kono Mama Kimi dake wo Ubaisaritai" until their latest single "Kimi he no Parade", which will be divided in 4 CDS.

Some singles are included for the first time on the album, such as "Kioku no Kage" and its coupling song "Asobi ni Ikou", which were previously released in 2016.

Single versions of "Zenkai Koigokoro", "Zutto Tsutaetakatta I Love You", "Boku ga Kimi wo Wasurenaiyouni" and "Kimi he no Parade" were included in album format for the first time.

Ikemori's solo single "Another Life" will be included in Deen's album for the first time since 2001 release.

The album will include new premium track, "Journey" which is written and produced by all three members together.

First press release will include 5th additional CD "Premium Disc" with eleven original songs by artist which composed and written for Deen, included Miho Komatsu, Seiichiro Kuribayashi, Tetsuro Oda, Wands and Zard. All of these songs were previously released in their compilation album "Deen The Best Kiseki" (with exception of Zard).

Fanclub members will exclusively receive special original album CD with title "Deen the Last" with twelve completely new and unreleased tracks, along with special features including history book and limited package format.

A special website "Deen Chronicle" was launched on 12 January with short commentary on each single.

It is the last album when guitarist and composer, Tagawa was involved with album production before band's withdrawal.

== Track listing ==
=== Disc 1: 1993-1997 ===
No.	Title	Lyrics	Music	Arrangers	Length
1.	"Kono Mama Kimi dake wo Ubaisaritaiこのまま君だけを奪い去りたい" (debut single)	Uesugi Show (Wands)	Tetsurō Oda	Takeshi Hayama	4:11
2.	"Tsubasa wo Hirogete (翼を広げて)" (2nd single)	Izumi Sakai (Zard)	Oda	Hayama	5:14
3.	"Memories" (3rd single)	Shuuichi Ikemori	Oda	Hayama	4:30
4.	"Eien wo Azuketekure (永遠をあずけてくれ)" (4th single)	Daria Kawashima	Seiichiro Kuribayashi	Hayama	4:57
5.	"Hitomi Sorasanaide (瞳そらさないで)" (5th single)	Sakai	Oda	Hayama	4:42
6.	"Teenage Dream" (6th single)	Sakai	Kuribayashi	Hayama	4:38
7.	"Mirai no Tameni (未来のために)" (7th single)	Ikemori	Ikemori, Naoki Uzumoto	Hirohito Furui (Garnet Crow)	4:41
8.	"Love Forever" (8th single)	Yuri Yamamoto	Shinji Tagawa	Hayama	4:32
9.	"Shounen (少年)" (8th single's coupling)	Ikemori	Kouji Yamane and Shinji Tagawa	Furui	4:50
10.	"Hitori Janai (ひとりじゃない)" (9th single)	Ikemori	Oda	Furui	4:00
11.	"Sunshine On Summer Time" (10th single)	Ikemori	Uzumoto	Furui	4:18
12.	"Egao de Waratteitai (素顔で笑っていたい)" (11th single)	Ikemori	Oda	Daisuke Ikeda	4:20
13.	"Kimi ga Inai Natsu (君がいない夏)" (12th single)	Komatsu	Miho Komatsu	Ikeda	4:23
14.	"Yume de Aru you ni (夢であるように)" (13th single)	Ikemori	Deen	Ikeda	4:40

=== Disc 2: 1998-2003 ===
No.	Title	Lyrics	Music	Arrangers	Length
1.	"Tooi Sora de (遠い空で)" (14th single)	Komatsu	Miho Komatsu	Daisuke Ikeda	4:39
2.	"Kimi Sae Ireba (君さえいれば)" (15th single)	Komatsu	Komats	Ikeda	4:36
3.	"Tegotae no Nai Ai (手ごたえのない愛)" (16th single)	Komatsu	Komatsu	Akihito Tokunaga	4:35
4.	"Tooi Tooi Mirai he (遠い遠い未来へ)" (17th single)	Nana Azuki (Garnet Crow)	Aika Ohno	Hirohito Furui (Garnet Crow)	4:10
5.	"Just One" (18th single)	Ikemori	Shuuichi Ikemori	Deen	4:35
6.	"My Love" (19th single)	Ikemori	Kouji Yamane and Naoki Uzumoto	Deen	4:10
7.	"Christmas Time" (君がいない夏, 1st classic single)	Ikemori	Yamane	Ikeda	4:00
8.	"Power of Love" (20th single)	Ikemori	Deen	Deen	4:08
9.	"Akizakura -more &more- (秋桜)" (2nd classic single)	Ikemori	Deen	Deen	3:40
10.	"Kanashimi no Mukougawa (哀しみの向こう側)" (21st single)	Ikemori	Ikemori and Yamane	Deen	4:54
11.	"Miagetegoran Yoru no Hoshi wo (見上げてごらん夜の星を)" (22nd single)	Eri Rukosuke	Izumi Taku	Deen	4:19
12.	"Yume de Aetara (夢で逢えたら)" (23rd single)	Shuuichi Ikemori	Ohtaki Eiichi	Deen	4:15
13.	"Birthday eve ~Dare yori mo Hayai Ai no Uta~ (誰よりも早い愛の歌)" (24th single)	Ikemori	Yamane	Deen	5:25
14.	"Tsubasa wo Kaze Nosete -fly away- (翼を風に乗せて)" (25th single)	Shuuichi Ikemori	Suzuki Hiroyuki	Deen	4:44

=== Disc 3: 2003-2009 ===
No.	Title	Lyrics	Music	Arrangers	Length
1.	"Taiyou to Hanabira (太陽と花びら)" (26th single)	Ikemori	Ikemori Shuuichi and Tokinori Kouichirou	Deen	4:59
2.	"Utopia wa Mieterunoni (ユートピアは見えてるのに)" (27th single)	Ikemori	Tsuchida Noriyuki	Deen	4:40
3.	"Rail no nai Sora he (レールのない空へ)" (28th single)	Ikemori	Suzuki Hiroyuki	Deen	5:00
4.	"Strong Soul" (29th single)	Ikemori	Kouji Yamane	Deen	4:16
5.	"Ai no Kagami ga Sekai ni Hibikimasuyouni (愛の鐘が世界に響きますように)" (30th single)	Ikemori	Yamane	Deen	5:31
6.	"Kono Mama Kimi dake wo Ubaisaritai -Kiseki ver.-このまま君だけを奪い去りたい" (31st single)	Show Uesugi	Tetsurō Oda	Masayuki Iwata	4:36
7.	"Tsubasa wo Hirogete -Kiseki ver.- (翼を広げて)" (31st single's coupling)	Izumi Sakai (Zard)	Oda	Shima Ken	5:14
8.	"Starting Over" (32nd single)	Ikemori	Oda	Takeshi Hayama	4:40
9.	"Diamond (ダイヤモンド)" (33rd single)	Ikemori	Yamane	Chokkaku	4:27
10.	"Yume no Tsubomi (夢の蕾)" (3rd classic single)	Ikemori	Yamane	Yamane	5:09
11.	"Smile Blue" (4th classic single)	Ikemori	Yamane	Yamane	5:03
12.	"Eien no Ashita (永遠の明日)" (34th single)	Ikemori	Ikemori	Deen	4:55
13.	"Celebrate" (35th single)	Ikemori	Yamane	Yamane	4:06
14.	"Negai" (36th single)	Ikemori	Yamane	Yamane	5:15

=== Disc 4: 2010-2018 ===
No.	Title	Lyrics	Music	Arrangers	Length
1.	"Coconuts" (37th single)	Ikemori	Yamane	Yamane	4:29
2.	"Brand New Wing" (38th single)	Ikemori	Shinji Tagawa	Tagawa	3:44
3.	"Kokoro kara Kimi ga Suki -Marriage- (心から君が好き〜マリアージュ〜)" (39th single)	Ikemori	Tagawa	Deen	5:06
4.	"Hatachi (二十歳)" (40th single)	Ikemori	Tagawa	Tagawa	5:03
5.	"Ame no Roppongi (雨の六本木)" (40th single's coupling)	Reiko Yukawa	Daisuke Inoue	Daisuke Ikeda	4:47
6.	"Mou Nakanaide (もう泣かないで)" (41st single)	Ikemori and Daria Kawashima	Kouji Yamane	Hirohito Furui (Garnet Crow)	3:29
7.	"Kimi ga Boku wo Wasurenaiyouni Boku ga Kimi wo Oboeteiru (君が僕を忘れないように 僕が君をおぼえている)" (42nd single)	Ikemori	Yamane	Yamane	4:25
8.	"Senkai Koigokoro! (千回恋心!)" (43rd single)	Ikemori	Tagawa	Tagawa	4:20
9.	"Zutto Tsutaetakatta I love you (ずっと伝えたかった I love you)" (44th single)	Ikemori	Tagawa	Takeshi Kudou	4:39
10.	"Kioku no Kage (記憶の影)" (45th single)	Ikemori	Yamane	Furui	3:58
11.	"Asobi ni Ikou! (記憶の影)" (46th single)	Ikemori	Yamane	Yuto Shinozaki	4:12
12.	"Kimi he no Parade (君へのパレード♪)" (47th single)	Ikemori	Yamane	Yamane	4:11
13.	"Another Life" (Shuuichi Ikemori's solo single)	Kim Hyung Suk	Deen	Hyung Suk	3:54
14.	"Journey" (new premium track)

=== Premium Disk ===
No.	Title	Lyrics	Music	Arrangers	Length
1.	"Hitomi Sorasanaide" (瞳そらさないで, performed by Zard)	Izumi Sakai (Zard)	Tetsurō Oda	Masao Akashi	4:50
2.	"Tsubasa wo Hirogete" (翼を広げて, performed by Zard)	Sakai	Oda	Akashi	4:33
3.	"Kono Mama Kimi Dake wo Ubaisaritai" (このまま君だけを奪い去りたい, performed by Wands)	Show Wesugi (Wands)	Oda	Takeshi Hayama	4:41
4.	"Tsubasa wo Hirogete" (翼を広げて, performed by Tetsuro Oda)	Sakai	Oda	J. Haskell	4:56
5.	"Kimi ga Inai Natsu" (君がいない夏, performed by Miho Komatsu)	Komatsu	Komatsu	Akashi	4:42
6.	"Eien wo Boku ni Azuketekure" (永遠をあずけてくれ, performed by Seiichiro Kuribayashi)	Daria Kawashima	Seiichiro Kuribayashi	Kuribayashi	5:18
7.	"Kimi Sae Ireba" (君さえいれば, performed by Miho Komatsu)	Komatsu	Komatsu	Yoshinobu Ohga (Sensation)	4:37
8.	"Kono Mama Kimi Dake wo Ubaisaritai" (このまま君だけを奪い去りたい, performed by Tetsuro Oda)	Wesugi	Oda	Haskell	5:09
9.	"Tegotae no Nai Ai" (手ごたえのない愛, performed by Miho Komatsu)	Komatsu	Komatsu	Hirohito Furui (Garnet Crow)	5:04
10.	"Tooi Sora he" (遠い空で, performed by Miho Komatsu)	Komatsu	Komatsu	Daisuke Ikeda	4:18
11.	"Teenage Dream" (performed by Zard)	Sakai	Kuribayashi	Akashi	4:54

== In media ==
- Kono Mama Kimi Dake wo Ubaisaritai was used as a commercial song for NTT DoCoMo's "Pocket Bell"
- Tsubasa wo Hirogete was used as an image song for Nihon TV program J League Chuukei
- Eien wo Azuketekure was used as a commercial song for NTT DoCoMo's "Pocket Bell"
- Hitomi Sorasanaide was used as a commercial song for Pokari Sweat
- Mirai no Tameni was used as an image song for Nihon TV's baseball program
- Love Forever was used as an ending theme for Tokyo Broadcasting System Television program Super Soccer
- Shounen was used as a theme song for TBS Television program Shounen Jidai
- Hitori ja nai was used as an ending theme for Anime television series Dragon Ball
- SUNSHINE ON SUMMER TIME was used as a commercial song of Kirin's "Ice Beer"
- Egao de Waratteitai was used as theme song for TV Asahi television series Shounibyou to Ichi no Kisetsu
- Kimi ga Inai Natsu was used as an ending theme for Anime television series Detective Conan
- Yume de Aru You ni was used as an opening theme for PlayStation 2 game Tales of Destiny
- Kimi Sae Ireba was used as an opening theme for Anime television series Chūka Ichiban!
- Tegotae no nai Ai was used as a theme song for TBS Television program Kinniku Banzuke
- Tooi Tooi Mirai he was used as a theme song for TBS Television program Kinniku Banzuke
- Just One was used as a commercial song for Sharp Color Fax's "Saiyuki"
- My Love was used as a theme song for Fuji TV television series Kaze no Yukue
- Christmas Time was used as theme song for TBS Television program Wonderful
- Power of Love was used as an ending theme song for Nihon TV program Sport Max
- Akizakura -more & more- was used as a theme song for TBS Television program Wonderful
- Kanashimi no Mukougawa was used as a theme song for Fuji TV television series Koufuku no Ashita
- Birth eve -Dare yori hayai mo Ai no Uta- was used as a theme song for TBS Television program Chu-bo desu yo!
- Taiyou to Hanabira was used as a theme song for Nihon TV program Shiodome Style
- Utopia ni Mieterunoni was used as an ending theme for TV Asahi Beat Takeshi no TV tackle
- Strong Soul was used as an image song for 35th anniversary of "Tokyo Verdy 1969"
- Ai no Kagami ga Sekai ni Hibikimasuyouni was used as an ending theme for TBS Television program Tamashii no One Spoon
- Starting Over was used as an ending theme for Nihon TV's program Itadaki Muscle
- Diamond was used as an official image song for "Chiba Lotte Marines"
- Yume no Tsubomi was used as an ending theme for TV Asahi Beat Takeshi no TV tackle
- Smile Blue was used as a theme song for NTV (Japan) program NNN News Real Time in "entertainment sport" corner
- Eien no Ashita was used as a theme song for Nintendo DS game Tales of Hearts
- Celebrate was used as an ending theme song for TBS Television program Megami Search in months of April–May 2008
- Brand New Wing was used as a power-play song for Nihon TV's program Happy Music
- Mou Nakanaide was used as a theme song for TV Asahi's television series Kasouken no Onna
