= Diamonds (Deen album) =

Studio album by Deen
- Released: 11 October 2006
- Recorded: 2005–2006
- Genre: Japanese pop
- Length: 48:23
- Label: BMG Japan
- Producer: DEEN

Deen chronology
| Road Cruisin' (2004) | Diamonds (2006) | Deen Next Stage (2009) |

Singles from Road Cruisin'
- 1. "Rail no nai Sora e" Released: April 28, 2006; 2. "Strong Soul" Released: June 30, 2006

Diamonds is the eighth studio album by Japanese pop band Deen. It was released on 18 August 2006 under BMG Funhouse.

== Background ==
From this album they moved from sub-label to main label, BMG Japan. Diamonds was released two years after Deen's previous album Road Cruisin'.

The album consists of two previously released singles, Starting Over and Diamond.

For the first time, the composer Kouji Yamane performed by himself his own written song Shanghai Rock Star. For the first time after eight years, some staff from Being Inc. were involved in album production, such as Tetsurō Oda and Takeshi Hayama.

This album was released in two formats: regular CD edition and limited CD+DVD edition. In DVD disc are included videoclips of the singles "Diamond".

== Charting performance ==
The album reached #20 in its first week and charted for 3 weeks, selling 10,000 copies.

== Track listing ==
All lyrics are written by Shuuichi Ikeda (expect of #9, by Kouji Yamane)

| No. | Title | Music | Arranger(s) | Length |
|---|---|---|---|---|
| 1. | "Niji no Kanata e" (虹の彼方へ) | Shuuichi Ikemori, Kouichirou Tokinori | Steve Good | 5:11 |
| 2. | "Diamonds" | Shuuichi Ikemori, Kouji Yamane | Chokkaku | 4:27 |
| 3. | "Family" | Kouji Yamane | Kouji Yamane | 3:42 |
| 4. | "Starting Over" | Tetsurō Oda | Takeshi Hayama | 4:39 |
| 5. | "Rosso!" (ロッソ!!) | Shuuichi Ikemori, Kouichirou Tokinori | Steve Good | 4:22 |
| 6. | "Tokyo" (東京) | Shuuichi Ikemori, Kouichirou Tokinori | Steve Good | 4:17 |
| 7. | "Life is" | Shinji Tagawa | Shinji Tagawa | 5:05 |
| 8. | "Sail Away" | Shinji Tagawa | Shinji Tagawa | 4:12 |
| 9. | "Shanghai Rock Star" (上海ロックスター) | Kouji Yamane/Shuuichi Ikemori | Steve Good | 4:07 |
| 10. | "By myself" | Kouji Yamane | Kouji Yamane | 4:27 |
| 11. | "Tobira" (扉) | Shinji Tagawa | DEEN | 4:02 |

== In media ==
- Starting Over - ending theme for Nihon TV program Itadaki Muscle!
- Diamonds - image song for Chiba Lotte Marines
- Niji no Kanate e - commercial song for Joguchi Atom
