= I Wish (Deen album) =

I wish

Studio album by Deen
- Released: 9 September 1996
- Recorded: 1995–1996
- Genre: Japanese pop, rock
- Length: 47 minutes
- Label: B-Gram Records
- Producer: BMF

Deen chronology
| Deen (1994) | I wish (1996) | Deen Singles +1 (1998) |

Singles from Deen
- 1. "Teenage Dream" Released: March 27, 1995; 2. "Love Forever/Shounen" Released: December 11, 1995; 3. "Hitori Janai" Released: April 15, 1996; 4. "Sunshine On Summer Time" Released: July 1, 1996; 5. "Egao de Waratteitai" Released: August 5, 1996

I Wish is the second studio album by the Japanese rock band Deen. It was released on 9 September 1996 under B-Gram Records. I Wish includes five previously released singles, since Teenage dream till Sugao de Waratteitai. Only five new tracks were included on this album. The album reached #2 in its first week and charted for 10 weeks, selling 612,000 copies.

== Track listing ==
| No. | Title | Lyrics | Music | Arranger(s) | Length |
|---|---|---|---|---|---|
| 1. | "Love Forever" | Yuri Yamamoto | Shinji Tagawa | Takeshi Hayama | 4:31 |
| 2. | "Sunshine On Summer Time" | Shuuichi Ikemori | Naoki Uzumoto | Hirohito Furui | 4:17 |
| 3. | "Teenage dream" | Izumi Sakai | Seiichiro Kuribayashi | Takeshi Hayama | 4:38 |
| 4. | "Hitori Janai" (ひとりじゃない) | Shuuichi Ikemori | Tetsurō Oda | Hirohito Furui | 3:59 |
| 5. | "Sha･la･la･la -I wish-" | Shuuichi Ikemori | Shuuichi Ikemori | Deen | 3:04 |
| 6. | "Hatenai Sekai he" (果てない世界へ) | Shuuichi Ikemori | Kouji Yamane | Daisuke Ikeda | 4:53 |
| 7. | "Egao de Waratteitai" (素顔で笑っていたい) | Shuuichi Ikemori | Tetsurō Oda | Daisuke Ikeda | 4:20 |
| 8. | "Crazy for you" | Shuuichi Ikemori | Naoki Uzumoto | Daisuke Ikeda | 4:05 |
| 9. | "Kimi no Kokoro ni Kaeritai" (君の心に帰りたい) | Shuuichi Ikemori | Kouji Yamane | Hirohito Furui | 4:51 |
| 10. | "Arittake no Egao" (ありったけの笑顔) | Shuuichi Ikemori | Naoki Uzumoto | Deen | 3:33 |
| 11. | "Shounen" (少年) | Shuuichi Ikemori | Kouji Yamane; Shinji Tagawa | Hirohito Furui | 4:50 |

== Personnel ==
- Shuuichi Ikemori – lead and backing vocals
- Shinji Tagawa – guitars
- Naoki Uzumoto – drums, percussion
- Koji Yamane – keyboards, backing vocals
