= Kočo =

Kočo or Kocho (Macedonian: Кочо) is a masculine given name. Notable people with the name include:

- Kocho Angjushev, Macedonian businessman
- Kočo Dimitrovski (born 1950), Macedonian football midfielder
- Kočo Racin, pen name of Kosta Apostolov Solev (1908–1943), Macedonian writer and communist
