= Graduation (Deen album) =

Studio album by Deen
- Released: 15 June 2011
- Recorded: 2011
- Genre: Japanese pop
- Length: 42:49
- Label: Ariola Japan
- Producer: Deen

Deen chronology
Crawl (2010)	Graduation (2011)	Marriage (2012)

Singles from Graduation
- 1. "Brand New Wing" Released: April 29, 2011

Graduation is the twelfth studio album by Japanese Pop band Deen. It was released on 15 June 2011 under music label Ariola Japan.

== Background ==
The album consists of only one previously released single, Brand New Wing.

Nine out of eleven tracks have title tracks borrowed from the chronologically release order of studio albums.

Leader Kouji Yamane's original song Shanghai Rock Star had received continuation (Episode 2) for the first time since the 2009 album Deen Next Stage.

This album was released in two formats: regular CD edition and limited A/B CD+DVD edition. The limited edition A includes compilation CD of ballads under the title Ballads in Blue II〜The greatest hits of DEEN〜. The limited edition B includes DVD of footage from their live performance Deen Live Joy Break-15 ~History~.

== Chart performance ==
The album debuted at No. 19 in its first week and charted for 2 weeks, selling over 6,000 copies.

== Track listing ==
All lyrics are written by Shuuichi Ikeda.

No.	Title	Music	Arranger(s)	Length
1.	"Brand New Wing"	Shinji Tagawa	Shinji Tagawa	3:44
2.	"I wish"	Kouji Yamane	Kouji Yamane	3:35
3.	"The Day ~Bokura ha Owaranai~" (The DAY 〜僕らは終わらない〜)	Shuuichi Ikemori, Kouichirou Tokinori	Shinji Tagawa	3:35
4.	"'Need love"	Shinji Tagawa	Shinji Tagawa	3:34
5.	"Pray"	Ikemori Shuuichi, Kaoru Kondou	Tsutomu Oohira	3:48
6.	"Utopia"	Shinji Tagawa	Shinji Tagawa	3:59
7.	"Road Cruisin' ~Johny to Lucy no Monogatari~" (ROAD CRUISIN' 〜ジョニーとルーシーの物語〜)	Shinji Tagawa	Shinji Tagawa	3:53
8.	"Diamonds ~Kizuna~" (Diamonds 〜絆〜)	Shuuichi Ikemori	Tsutomu Oohira	3:46
9.	"Next Stage"	Kouji Yamane	Kouji Yamane	4:31
10.	"Lovers Concerto ~Shanghai Rock Star Episode 2~" (LOVERS CONCERTO 〜上海ロックスターEpisode2〜)	Kouji Yamane	Kouji Yamane	5:20
11.	"Sotsugyou" (卒業)	Kouji Yamane	Kouji Yamane	4:38

== In media ==
- Brand New Wing - theme song for the Nihon TV music program Happy Music
