= Butterfly (Deen album) =

Studio album by Deen
- Released: 1 June 2016
- Recorded: 2016
- Genre: Japanese pop
- Length: 50:35
- Label: Epic Records Japan
- Producer: DEEN

Deen chronology
Zenkai Koigokoro!! ~Missing you~ (2015)	Butterfly (2016)	Parade (2017)

Butterfly is the sixteenth studio album by Japanese pop band Deen. It was released on 1 June 2016 under the Epic Records Japan label.

== Background ==
This album doesn't consist of any single. The single Zutto Tsutaekatta I love you didn't make it in this album, instead it would be included in their seventeenth studio album Parade which released in August 2017.

According to the band's official website, it is the continuation of their studio album Crawl as the Summer Special Album Vol.2.

This album includes completely new tracks with several tracks of their big hits such as Hitori Janai, Smile Blue and coconuts feat.kokomo with completely new arrangement of the summer feeling.

Shinji and Kouji in this album perform their own original songs Climb High and Walking on Sunshine. The album includes as well the covers of Yumi Matsutoya's song Mannatsu no Yoru no Yume and The Boom's song Kaze ni Naritai.

This album was released in three formats: regular CD edition and limited A/B CD+DVD edition. The limited A edition includes DVD footage of their live performance Deen Live Joy - Break19 ~Zenkai Koigokoro!!~. The limited B edition includes CD with seven live recordings from their live performance Deen AOR Night Cruisin' ~3rd Groove~

== Charting ==
The album reached No. 23 in its first week and charted for 3 weeks, selling 5,000+ copies.

== Track listing ==
All lyrics are written by Shuuichi Ikeda (expect of #4 (Yumi Matsutoya), #8 (Kouji Yamane) #9 (Kazufumi Miyazawa))

No.	Title	Music	Arranger(s)	Length
1.	"Hitori Janai ~Ska Style~" (ひとりじゃない ~SKA Style~)	Tetsurō Oda	Yutaka Sone	4:15
2.	"Summer Lovers 2016" (サマー・ラバーズ 2016)	Kouji Yamane	Kouji Yamane	3:54
3.	"Episode wo Tsukuridase!" (エピソードをつくりだせ!)	Shinji Tagawa	Shinji Tagawa	4:07
4.	"Mannatsu no Yoru no Yume" (真夏の夜の夢)	Yumi Matsutoya	Yumi Matsutoya	4:51
5.	"Amalfi" (アマルフィ)	Shinji Tagawa	Shinji Tagawa	5:11
6.	"Smile Blue～SKA Style～"	Shinji Tagawa	Yutaka Sone	5:06
7.	"Climb High"	Shinji Tagawa	Shinji Tagawa	4:26
8.	"Walking on Sunshine"	Kouji Yamane	Kouji Yamane	4:18
9.	"Kaze ni Naritai" (風になりたい)	Kazufumi Miyazawa	Yutaka Sone	5:05
10.	"coconuts feat. butterfly"	Kouji Yamane	Yutaka Sone	4:34
11.	"Himawari" (ひまわり)	Kouji Yamane	Kouji Yamane	4:49
