= Butterfill =

Butterfill is a British surname.

== People with the surname ==
- John Butterfill (1941–2021), British politician
- Stephen Butterfill, British philosopher and professor

== See also ==
- Butterfly
