= Pray (Deen album) =

Studio album by Deen
- Released: 20 November 2002
- Recorded: 2001–2002
- Genre: Japanese pop
- Length: 55:35
- Label: Berg label
- Producer: DEEN

Deen chronology
'Need love (2000)	Pray (2002)	Utopia (2003)

Singles from Pray
- 1. "Birthday eve ~Dare yori mo Hayai Ai no Uta~" Released: October 2, 2002

Pray is the fifth studio album by Japanese Pop band Deen. It was released on 20 November 2002 under Berg label records. The album consists of only one previously released single, Birthday eve ~Dare yori mo Hayai Ai no Uta~ and its coupling song. Bonus track "Christmas Time" appeared only in limited first-press release. This song was originally released in conceptual single "Classics One: White Christmas time".

Since this album only three of the four original band members – Shuichi Ikemori, Koji Yamane and Shinji Tagawa – (without the drummer Naoki Uzumoto) continued their music activities.

The album reached #12 in its first week and charted for 4 weeks, selling 24,377 copies.

== Track listing ==
All lyrics are written by Shuuichi Ikeda

No.	Title	Music	Arranger(s)	Length
1.	"Magic"	Kouji Yamane	DEEN	4:08
2.	"Birthday eve ~Dare yori mo Hayai Ai no Uta~" (Birthday eve 〜誰よりも早い愛の歌〜)	Kouji Yamane	Kouichirou Tokinori, DEEN	5:24
3.	"I..." (空もハレルヤ)	Noriyuki Tsuchida	DEEN, Tsutomu Oohira	4:13
4.	"Kaze mo Hallelujah"	Ikemori Shuuichi	Kouichirou Tokinori, DEEN	4:13
5.	"We can change the world"	Shinji Tagawa	DEEN	3:55
6.	"Call your name"	Hiroyuki Suzuki	DEEN, Hiroyuki Suzuki	5:13
7.	"I say to my love"	Kouichirou Tokinori	Kouichirou Tokinori, DEEN	4:22
8.	"Take your hands"	Hiroyuki Suzuki	DEEN	4:36
9.	"Tears on Earth"	Akane Irihi	DEEN	5:07
10.	"Break it!" (24th single's coupling)	Ikemori Shuuichi	Kouichirou Tokinori, DEEN	4:38
11.	"Bridge ~Ai no Kotoba Ai no Chikara~" (Bridge 〜愛の言葉 愛の力〜 ＜Boogie woogie Style＞)	Kim-Hyungsuk	Kim-Hyungsuk	3:12
12.	"Momi no Ki no Shita de..." (もみの木の下で・・・)	Bingou Izawa	DEEN	4:05
13.	"Christmas time" (*bonus track in limited version)	Kouji Yamane	DEEN	2:36

== In media ==
- Birthday eve ~Dare yori mo Hayai Ai no Uta~ - insert song for Tokyo Broadcasting System Television program Saturday Night Chubaw!
