= Butterfly (disambiguation) =

A butterfly is a flying insect.

Butterfly may also refer to:

== Companies ==
- Butterfly (company), an American film production company 1917–1918
- Butterfly (brand), used by Japanese table tennis apparel and equipment supplier Tamasu

== Film and television ==
=== Film ===
- The Butterfly (1914 film), an American silent short film by Tom Ricketts
- Butterfly (1924 film), an American silent drama by Clarence Brown
- Butterfly (1982 film), an American crime film by Matt Cimber
- Butterfly (1999 film) or Butterfly's Tongue, a Spanish film by José Luis Cuerda
- Butterfly (2000 film), a documentary about Julia Butterfly Hill by Doug Wolens
- The Butterfly (2001 film) or Nabi, a South Korean film by Moon Seung-wook
- The Butterfly (2002 film), a French film by Philippe Muyl
- Butterfly (2004 film), a Hong Kong film by Yan Yan Mak
- Butterfly (2015 film), an Argentine film by Marco Berger
- Butterfly (2022 film), an Indian Telugu-language mystery thriller
- Butterfly (2023 film), an Indian Marathi-language drama
- Butterfly (2024 film), a French animated short film by Florence Miailhe
- Butterfly (unreleased film), an Indian Kannada-language film by Ramesh Aravind

=== Television ===
- Butterfly (2018 TV series), a British drama miniseries
- Butterfly (2025 TV series), an American/South-Korean spy thriller series
- "Butterfly" (Haven), a 2010 episode
- "Butterfly" (Teletubbies), a 1997 episode
- "The Butterfly" (The Amazing World of Gumball), a 2015 episode

== Games and sports ==
- Butterfly (game), a two-player abstract strategy game
- Butterfly stroke, a swimming technique
- Butterfly style, a goaltending technique in ice hockey

== Literature ==
- Butterfly (comics), Layla Miller, a Marvel Comics character
- Butterfly (novel), 2009, by Sonya Hartnett
- Butterfly, a 1989 novel by Kathryn Harvey (Barbara Wood)
- The Butterfly (novel), 1947, by James M. Cain
- The Butterfly, a 2000 children's book by Patricia Polacco

== Music ==
=== Albums ===
- ButterFly (Barbra Streisand album), 1974
- Butterfly (Deen album), 2016
- Butterfly (Hollies album) or the title song, 1967
- Butterfly (Jolin Tsai album) or the title song, 2009
- Butterfly (Kimiko Kasai album), 1979
- Butterfly (L'Arc-en-Ciel album), 2012
- Butterfly (Mariah Carey album) or the title song (see below), 1997
- Butterfly (Natalie Merchant album) or the title song, 2017
- Butterfly (Sara Tunes album) or the title song, 2010
- Butterfly, by Ailee, 2019
- Butterfly, by Kelli Ali, 2009
- The House of Love (1990 album), by the House of Love, also known as The Butterfly Album

=== Songs ===
- "Butterfly" (1957 song), written by Bernie Lowe and Kal Mann
- "Butterfly" (Crazy Town song), 2000
- "Butterfly" (Danyel Gérard song), 1970
- "Butterfly" (Kaela Kimura song), 2009
- "Butterfly" (Koda Kumi song), 2005
- "Butterfly" (Kylie Minogue song), 2001
- "Butterfly" (Lloyd Cole song), 1992
- "Butterfly" (Loona song), 2019
- "Butterfly" (Mariah Carey song), 1997
- "Butterfly" (Marina song), 2025
- "Butterfly" (Smile.dk song), 1998
- "Butter-Fly", by Kōji Wada, 1999
- "Butterfly", by the Bee Gees, covered on Barry Gibb's album Greenfields, 2021
- "Butterfly", by BTS from The Most Beautiful Moment in Life, Pt. 2, 2015
- "Butterfly", by Candlebox from Lucy, 1995
- "Butterfly", by Cosmic Girls from Neverland, 2020
- "Butterfly", by Demi Lovato from Dancing with the Devil... the Art of Starting Over, 2021
- "Butterfly", by G-Dragon from Heartbreaker, 2009
- "Butterfly", by Grimes from Art Angels, 2015
- "Butterfly", by Herbie Hancock from Thrust, 1974
- "Butterfly", by Jason Mraz from We Sing. We Dance. We Steal Things., 2008
- "Butterfly", by Jessica Mauboy from Hilda, 2019
- "Butterfly", by Kehlani from While We Wait, 2019
- "Butterfly", by Lenny Kravitz from Mama Said, 1991
- "Butterfly", by Markus Feehily from Fire, 2015
- "Butterfly", by MC Cheung from Treble, 2024
- "Butterfly", by Perfume from Game, 2008
- "Butterfly", by Pink Floyd from 1965: Their First Recordings, 2015
- "Butterfly", by Screaming Trees from Sweet Oblivion, 1992
- "Butterfly", by Serj Tankian from Harakiri, 2012
- "Butterfly", by Take That from Beautiful World, 2006
- "Butterfly", by Tori Amos from the film soundtrack Higher Learning, 1995
- "Butterfly", by The Verve from A Storm in Heaven, 1993
- "Butterfly" by Weeekly from We Play, 2021
- "Butterfly", by Weezer from Pinkerton, 1996
- "The Butterfly", by Little River Band from Too Late to Load, 1989
- "Butterfly", by James from Yummy, 2024

=== Other uses in music ===
- Butterfly Recordings, three American record labels
- Étude Op. 25, No. 9 (Chopin) or "Butterfly"
- The Butterflys, a 1960s-era group signed to Red Bird Records

== People ==
- Julia Butterfly Hill (born 1974), American activist and environmentalist
- Butterfly Boucher (born 1979), Australian singer-songwriter, instrumentalist, and producer
- Butterfly McQueen (1911–1995), American actress

== Places ==
- Butterfly (constituency), Tuen Mun District, Hong Kong
- Butterfly, Kentucky, US

== Technology ==
- BBN Butterfly, a 1980s massively parallel computer
- Butterfly (dinghy), a boat
- Butterfly (lighting), a cinema lighting methodology
- Butterfly (print head), a part of the print head of line-oriented printers
- Butterfly Bomb, a German cluster bomb in World War II
- Butterfly joint in woodworking
- Butterfly knife, a Filipino-origin knife
- Butterfly loop, a mid-line knot
- Butterfly valve, a mechanic component of a carburetor
- Butterfly vibrator, a type of strap-on clitoral vibrator
- GibboGear Butterfly, an ultralite trike aircraft
- Butterfly needle, winged infusion set, in medical practice
- Butterfly, a roller coaster element
- Butterfly, the code-name and common name of the IBM ThinkPad 701 keyboard
- Butterfly, a typeface by Wagner & Schmidt, licensed by Schriftguss AG

== Other uses ==
- Butterfly (options), a financial trading strategy
- Butterfly catastrophe, in mathematical singularity theory
- Butterfly dance, a dance move
- Butterfly stop, a railway station in Hong Kong
- Butterflying, a butchery technique

== See also ==
- Butterflies (disambiguation)
- Butterfill, a surname
- "Butterfly, Butterfly (The Last Hurrah)", a 2010 song by a-ha
- Butterfly diagram, used to illustrate fast Fourier transforms
- Butterfly effect, the idea that small causes can have large effects
- Butterfly Koi, an ornamental fish
- Falter (German for Butterfly), a magazine
- Madame Butterfly (disambiguation)
