= Sara Tunes =

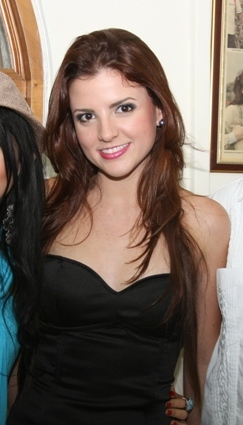

Background information
- Born: Sara Agudelo Restrepo; October 5, 1992 (age 33)
- Origin: Medellín, Colombia
- Genres: Latin pop
- Occupation: Singer-songwriter
- Instruments: Voice, piano
- Years active: 2002–present
- Label: EMI
- Website: saratunes.com

Sara Agudelo Restrepo (born October 5, 1992, Medellín, Colombia), known as Sara Tunes, is a Colombian Latin pop singer-songwriter. Sara Tunes is a pop singer and composer, although her work includes subgenres such as electronic music, R&B, blues and reggaeton. She has recorded several albums.

In 2010 she released her debut album, Butterfly, and her first professional music video for the song "And I Love You" (from the same album). In August that year, she entered the MTV (Latin America) chart with the video "Asi Te Amo" ("And I Love You"), and in December was nominated for three TV FAMA Awards, of which she won two, for Best Video of the Year and Best Pop Artist of the Year.

== Life and career ==
She began singing at an early age and participated in her school choir where he was soloist. At the age of 11, she recorded her first album with the choir, Morning Star, in which she participated as a soloist.

She has participated with Juan Fernando Velasco, Andres Cepeda, Alberto Plaza, Fanny Lu, Janeth, Rudi Lascala, Manolo Galvan, Storm, Boarding Pass, Julio Nava, Tinto, COLD, Those Inside and Kudai, Aleks Syntek and Christian Chavez in different guises, and also performed with Andrea Bocelli in Panama.

In 2010, she started her media and concert tour, promoting her album around Colombia. On July 22, she appeared as a guest artist to show homage to Michael Jackson, singing "All My Love is You" at the Teatro Universidad de Medellín, with the Colombian dance group, Rhythm Extreme. After obtaining recognition with her video "I Love You So" and the release of the album, the media began to identify her as the Colombian pop queen.

== Discography ==
=== EPs ===
- "Villancicos de Todas la Épocas" (2003)
- "¿Para Qué?" (2006)

=== Albums ===
- Butterfly (2010)
- 'Second official album' (2012)
