= Butterflies (Mexico City) =

Former gay nightclub in Mexico City

Butterflies, also called Butterfly, El Butter and later Buttergold, was a gay nightclub in the historic center of Mexico City. It stood at Izazaga 9, almost at the corner of Eje Central, by the Salto del Agua Metro station. It opened in the mid-1980s in an enormous warehouse on two floors, with room for more than 1,000 people. The guidebook Let's Go called it "the biggest, brashest gay night spot in town". It was best known for its drag (travesti) show, on whose stage Yuri and Laura León appeared. Sources give 2011 as the year it closed.

== History ==
Butterflies opened in the mid-1980s on Izazaga street, between the Callejón de la Igualdad and Eje Central, next to the Viana store. Héctor Bialostozky's history of the city's gay bars calls it a huge "warehouse-disco". In 1995 Let's Go described the dance floor as "a crowded tangle of humanity", with video screens, a superb lighting system and a male revue. A 1996 gay guide called it Mexico City's "mega gay dance club", two storeys tall, with capacity for over 1,000 people. The Spartacus International Gay Guide listed it as a large place, crowded on weekends. It opened at 9 p.m. and closed at 3 a.m., and was shut on Mondays. The music was mostly pop and Mexican folk. Bialostozky describes a mixed crowd, mostly older middle-class gay men, and a big dance floor for salsa and tropical music as well as pop in Spanish and English. A 2022 book on the sounds of the historic center, published by the city's Fideicomiso Centro Histórico, describes the corner of Izazaga and Eje Central as a meeting point of the city's LGBT community.

In 2001 the cultural magazine Generación wrote that, "though it may seem commercial", the disco was known for its sound equipment, its music and its atmosphere. Celebrities went there regularly. It also had an "international show". In 2006 the city guide DF por travesías called it an "immense old warehouse with one of the best drag shows in the city: lots of production and a range of characters". The 2005 Moon Handbooks guide called it "a big club that holds the city's best drag revue by far", always packed on Friday and Saturday nights.

== The show ==
The drag show was the club's trademark. Chilango wrote that many compared it with shows in Madrid, Las Vegas or San Francisco, and that not only impersonators but "the real ones" performed, among them Yuri and Laura León. The same book says that, according to "those who know this art", its drag show was "export quality". The trans performer Terry Holiday recalls in her memoirs that at Butterflies she did Amii Stewart, Alicia Bridges and Dalida.

In one of the 36 pieces in Nostalgia de Monsiváis, a 2025 tribute book edited by Marta Lamas and Rodrigo Parrini, the writer describes a night at the "Butter" as "an outsized display of Mexican gay fantasies". There were regional dances in drag and impersonators of pop and ranchera singers. The star turn was a Juan Gabriel impersonator in a sequined suit. That night the writer saw Carlos Monsiváis in the parking lot with the film critic Carlos Bonfil.

== Later years and closure ==
A Lonely Planet guide to Mexico called it "an airplane hangar-sized space", open Tuesday to Sunday from 9 p.m. to 4 a.m. The club later operated as Buttergold, "aka Butterflies, aka El Butter". Lonely Planet's Mexico City guide counted five bars, a snack bar and a big stage for choreographed drag shows. It was "fun for straights, too". A 2007 lesbian travel guide listed it as popular with both lesbians and gay men, with two floors and lavish drag shows on Fridays and Saturdays. Out Traveler still listed it in 2012 as "the justly popular Butterflies (aka Buttergold)", with a crowd of various ages. Chilango's listing of Buttergold said that for a long time the club had been known as the Butterfly: "the name may have changed, but not the spirit".

Chilango called it "one of the most emblematic places for the rainbow community" of Mexico City and wrote that when it closed in 2011, "an era came to an end". In 2015 a regular quoted by Time Out still called it "the legendary Butterflies, famous for its drag shows".

== See also ==
- LGBTQ culture in Mexico City
- El Taller
