= The Day (Deen album) =

The day

Studio album by Deen
- Released: 16 December 1998
- Recorded: 1998
- Genre: Japanese pop, rock
- Length: 48:12 minutes
- Label: Berg label
- Producer: BMF

Deen chronology
Deen Singles +1 (1998)	The day (1998)	'Need love (2000)

Singles from The Day
- 1. "Kimi Sae Ireba" Released: May 27, 1998; 2. "Tegotae no nai Ai" Released: November 18, 1998

The Day is the third studio album by Japanese rock band Deen. It was released on 16 December 1998 under Berg label records. The album consists of two previously released singles, Kimi Sae Ireba and Tegotae no nai Ai. Both of these singles were composed and written by Japanese singer-songwriter Miho Komatsu.

This is the first album released at the BMG JAPAN Incorporation. Although they moved from Being Inc. agency, several staff members as Daisuke Ikeda, Hirohito Furui and Akihito Tokunaga continued cooperating with them.

The album reached #9 in its first week and charted for 6 weeks, selling 143,420 copies.

== Track listing ==
No.	Title	Lyrics	Music	Arranger(s)	Length
1.	"One Day"	Ikeda Shuuichi	Naoki Uzumoto	Deen	1:57
2.	"Love me"	Shuuichi Ikemori	Kouji Yamane	Daisuke Ikeda	4:05
3.	"Tegotae no nai Ai" (手ごたえのない愛)	Miho Komatsu	Miho Komatsu	Akihito Tokunaga	4:33
4.	"Gravity"	Shuuichi Ikemori	DEEN	DEEN, Daisuke Ikeda	4:10
5.	"Voyage"	Shuuichi Ikemori	Kouji Yamane, Naoki Uzumoto	Daisuke Ikeda	5:16
6.	"Kieru Koto no nai Tsumi" (Guilty 〜消えることのない罪〜)	Shuuichi Ikemori	Kouji Yamane	DEEN	4:11
7.	"Tooi ni Yuku yo" (逢いにゆくよ)	Shuuichi Ikemori	Kouji Yamane	Hirohito Furui	4:55
8.	"Nemutta Mama no Jounetsu" (眠ったままの情熱)	Shuuichi Ikemori	Kouji Yamane, Naoki Uzumoto	DEEN	3:41
9.	"Sayonara" (さよなら)	Shuuichi Ikemori	Shinji Tagawa	Daisuke Ikeda, DEEN	4:28
10.	"Kimi Sae Ireba" (君さえいれば)	Miho Komatsu	Miho Komatsu	Daisuke Ikeda	4:35
11.	"Kimi no Nai Holidays" (君のいないholiday)	Shuuichi Ikemori	Naoki Uzumoto	DEEN	4:16
12.	"Kimi no Nai Holidays" (君のいないholiday)	Shuuichi Ikemori	Kouji Yamane, Naoki Uzumoto	DEEN	2:11

== In media ==
- Kimi Sae Ireba - opening theme for Anime television series Chūka Ichiban!
- Tegotae no Nai Ai - ending theme for TBS program Muscle Ranking
- A day in my life - radio commercial song for Kyushu Electric Power

== Cover ==
Miho Komatsu covered Tegotae no nai Ai in her album Mirai and Kimi Sae Ireba in Hanano.
