= Soul of a Demon =

- Directed by: Chang Tso-chi
- Screenplay by: Chang Tso-chi
- Produced by: Lin Yi-Chang
- Starring: Tseng Yi-Che; Chen Pei-Jun; Cheng Yu-Ren; Chan Cheng-Yun; Hsieh Yue-Hsia
- Cinematography: Chang Chan
- Edited by: Chang Tso-chi
- Production company: Chang Tso-chi Film Studio
- Release dates: 23 November 2007 (Golden Horse Film Festival and Awards); 9 February 2008 (Berlin International Film Festival); 13 June 2008 (Theatrical release)
- Running time: 126 minutes
- Country: Taiwan
- Languages: Taiwanese Mandarin; Taiwanese Hokkien; Japanese; Yami language
- Budget: $1,000,000 New Taiwan dollars

Soul of a Demon (Chinese: 蝴蝶) is a feature-length narrative film made by Taiwanese director Chang Tso-Chi in 2007. The film was selected for the Panorama section of the 58th Berlin International Film Festival as well as the Competition entry at the 21st Singapore International Film Festival. Setting an unprecedented record, Soul of a Demon opened both the 44th Golden Horse Film Festival and the 32nd Hong Kong International Film Festival.

Taking five years for director Chang Tso-Chi and his crew to shoot, Soul of a Demon cost a production budget of one million New Taiwanese dollars. Exploring a rare film genre in Taiwanese cinema, Soul of a Demon incorporates four languages: Mandarin, Taiwanese Hokkien, Japanese, and the Yami language of the Tao People. The shooting locations range from Nanfang'ao Fishing Port to Orchid Island (Lanyu), showcasing the pristine beauty of Taiwan's eastern region.

"The film continues Chang Tso-Chi's previous focus on the lives of the underprivileged and carries on his unique aesthetic of violence." Known for his focus on the struggles of the marginalized, Chang Tso-Chi weaves a narrative that intertwines personal journeys with larger societal issues. Through his unique blend of violence and beauty, he exposes the harsh realities faced by those living on the fringes of society while showcasing the resilience and indomitable spirit of his characters.

Soul of a Demon tells the story of Yi-Che, who grew up in Nanfang'ao. His grandfather is from Japan, and his mother belongs to the Indigenous community in Orchid Island (Lanyu). All of this makes Yi-Che's background a microcosm of the local history of Nanfang'ao. Chang Tso-Chi's initial creative concept for this film was ambitious, involving the local history of Nanfang'ao and incorporating elements of traditional puppetry of Taiwan as well as other Indigenous cultural references. He also attempted to combine CGI animation to further develop and enhance the "magical realism" technique frequently used in his previous films. Unfortunately, unexpected issues arose during the production process, preventing the realization of the original plans to their full extent.

== Butterfly: babanalidu, the soul of a demon ==
In Orchid Island (Lanyu), butterflies are called the "soul of a demon" because its graceful movements resemble the dancing souls of the deceased. It is a poetic and haunting image that captures the imagination of Orchid Island's inhabitants. The connection between butterflies and souls runs deep in their beliefs and cultural traditions. In the Indigenous language of Orchid Island (Lanyu), the hometown of Yi-Che's mother, there is no specific word for butterfly. Instead, the people of Orchid Island (Lanyu) refer to them as babanalidu, which translates to the soul of a demon. This phrase reflects the unique perspective of the people of Orchid Island (Lanyu), combining the concept of the demon representing the deceased and the soul's journey toward heaven. The butterfly, with its ethereal beauty and delicate flight, becomes a symbol of the spiritual realm and a connection to the afterlife.

== Plot ==
The story of Yi-Che (played by Tseng Yi-Che), the main character in the film, unfolds against the backdrop of Nanfang'ao, a fishing port in his hometown. This picturesque coastal town serves as a vivid representation of the beauty and struggles of the community. The narrative delves into the complexities of Yi-Che's heritage, with his mother from the Indigenous community in Orchid Island (Lanyu) and his father embracing Japanese culture. It is a reflection of the cultural melting pot that exists in Taiwan and the diverse identities of its people.

Yi-Che's journey is one of resilience and self-discovery. Three years ago, in order to save his young brother, Ah Ren (played by Cheng Yu-Ren), Yi-Che took the blame for Ah Ren's accidental killing and went to prison. Imprisoned for three years, Yi-Che carries the burden of his brother's actions, sacrificing his own freedom for the sake of family loyalty, while their father took Ah Ren and fled to Japan. After being released from prison, Yi-Che returns to his hometown, the fishing port in Nanfang'ao. Overwhelmed by bitterness, the person Yi-Che resents the most is his father, who abandons their mother to escape to Japan with his brother and allowed their mother to commit suicide by drowning herself in the ocean. While Yi-Che is behind bars, their enemy, Ah Shun, has grown in power and vowed to never let go of their past animosity. Similarly, Yi-Che, who had hoped to reunite with his girlfriend and start a new life after his release, finds himself facing a myriad of challenges and unresolved conflicts. The return of his father and brother, who had fled to Japan, reopens old wounds and ignites a new wave of tension between their family and local gangs.

Yi-Che's reunion with his girlfriend, Ah Pei (played by Chen Pei-Jun), was meant to mark the beginning of a new chapter in their lives. However, their hopes for a peaceful new life are shattered as the past catches up with them. The return of Yi-Che's father and Ah Ren stirs up sensitive nerves between their family and their enemies. The entangled web of grudges and vendettas between his family and their enemies threatens to consume them all. The specter of Ah Shun, their long-standing foe, looms large, seeking to exact a painful price from Yi-Che and his family for past transgressions. Yi-Che's father, in pursuit of gangster interests, approaches Ah Shun. Ah Shun, finally seizing the opportunity for revenge, does everything he can to humiliate Yi-Che's father and his younger brother Ah Ren. Accidentally, Ah Shun takes the life of Ah Ren's girlfriend, Xiao Gui (played by Chan Cheng-Yun), leading to the violent eruption of the accumulated grievances between the two families.

Amidst the turmoil, Yi-Che finds himself grappling with questions of identity and purpose. The wounds of his mother's abandonment and the weight of his father's choices weigh heavily on him. He yearns for reconciliation and understanding but is caught in the crossfire of conflicting loyalties and emotions. The film explores the intricate dynamics of Yi-Che's interpersonal relationships, highlighting the complexities of familial bonds and the resilience of the human spirit.

== Cast ==
- Yi-Che, played by Tseng Yi-Che: The oldest son in the family, Yi-Che, who ended up in prison for taking the blame for his younger brother Ah Ren's crimes, is determined to start a new life with his girlfriend after serving his sentence. However, he unexpectedly encounters an old enemy with whom his family had a deep-rooted grudge from years ago. This unexpected turn of events disrupts Yi-Che's hope for a peaceful life and sets off a tumultuous journey.
- Ah Pei, played by Chen Pei-Jun: Ah Pei, who returns to her hometown from the city, is Yi-Che's girlfriend. Having a painful past, Ah Pei chooses to silence her own voice, remaining silent ever since. Observing with a cold gaze the various events unfolding in her boyfriend, Yi-Che's life, she feels powerless in the face of everything, even though she can foresee the tragedy that is about to happen.
- Ah Ren, played by Cheng Yu-Ren: Ah Ren, characterized by impulsive temper, is Yi-Che's younger brother. He once accidentally killed someone and nearly faced imprisonment. His brother, Yi-Che, took the blame for him and went to prison for three years. Meanwhile, he fled to Japan with their father.
- Yi-Che and Ah Ren's father: Yi-Che and Ah Ren's father is man who has always embraced Japanese culture. Due to his grudge with gangster Ah Shun, he abandoned Yi-Che's mother, allowing her to commit suicide, and took Yi-Che's younger brother to Japan. After Yi-Che was released from prison, he returns to Nanfang'ao to sort out his business with the gangsters.
- Xiao Gui, played by Chan Cheng-Yun
- Yue-hsia, played by Hsieh Yue-Hsia
