= Butterfly (Sara Tunes album) =

Studio album by Sara Tunes
- Released: June 18, 2010
- Recorded: 2008–2010; Small Beat Music; Miami, Florida; Promix Music; Colombia
- Genre: Pop, dance-pop, teen pop
- Length: 40:28 (CD Standard); 46:36 (iTunes Edition); 53:22 (Deluxe)
- Label: EMI
- Producer: Albeiro Agudelo, Leonardo Torres, Sara Agudelo, Alexander Berrío.

Sara Tunes chronology
¿Para Qué? (2006)	Butterfly (2010)

Singles from Butterfly
- 1. "Asi Te Amo" Released: April 8, 2010; 2. "Noche De Paz (Silent Night)" Released: December 15, 2010(promotional single); 3. "Lento" Released: March 1, 2011(radio); 4. "Tú" Released: March 11, 2011

Butterfly is the debut studio album by the Colombian singer-songwriter Sara Tunes. It was released on June 6 on Colombia and October 15, 2010 in Latin America by EMI. Butterfly was her third studio album, but counted as a debut album as the other two had not had the success expected.

== Singles ==
=== Official singles ===
- "Asi Te Amo" was the first single, was released on April 8, 2010 by airplay and has a music video recorded in the city of Medellín.
- "Noche De Paz (Silent Night)" was released on December 15, 2010. The video showed Tunes singing and sitting on a piano.
- "Tú" was the second official single by Tunes, was released on March 11, 2011, and has the collaboration of urban music duo of "Golpe a Golpe". The song did not have a music video.

=== Others songs ===
- "Si Tu No Estas" is a song featuring the Colombian reggaeton musician J. Balvin. The song had elements of pop, Colombian hip hop and reggaeton.
- "Butterfly" is a Latín pop song with a chorus in English and Spanish verses.

== Tour ==
Sara Tunes confirmed April 9, 2011 a tour that started in the U.S. and Canada, but Sara has not confirmed if the tour went through Latin America. The tour recorera by states like New York, New Jersey, Rhode Island, Boston, Florida and Orlando, among others. Tour is expected to start in late 2011 or early 2012.

== Track listing ==
All lyrics are written by Sara Agudelo, Albeiro Agudelo, Leonardo Torres, Alexander Berrío.

No.	Title	Length
1.	"Butterfly"	3:32
2.	"Lo Único Que Quiero"	4:28
3.	"Asi Te Amo"	4:40
4.	"No Quiero"	3:17
5.	"A Dónde Vas"	4:40
6.	"Lento"	3:30
7.	"Sueño de Verano"	3:51
8.	"Y Quien Te Dijo"	3:38
9.	"Amarte Asi"	4:01
10.	"Mis 15"	3:05
11.	"Si Tu No Estas"	3:46

All lyrics are written by Sara Agudelo, Albeiro Agudelo, Leonardo Torres, Alexander Berrío.

Deluxe edition bonus tracks
No.	Title	Length
12.	"Asi Te Amo (Remix)" (iTunes bonus track)	3:59
13.	"Tu (ft. Golpe A Golpe)" (iTunes bonus track)	2:49
14.	"Solo Palabras" (CD bonus track)	3:43
15.	"Noche De Paz (Silent Night)" (CD bonus track)	3:34
