= Deen (album) =

Studio album by Deen
- Released: 14 September 1994
- Recorded: 1993・1994
- Genre: Japanese pop, rock
- Length: 51 minutes
- Label: B-Gram Records
- Producer: BMF

Deen chronology
| Deen (1994) | I wish (1996) |

Singles from Deen
- 1. "Kono Mama Kimi Dake wo Ubaisaritai" Released: March 10, 1993; 2. "Memories" Released: September 22, 1993; 3. "Eien wo Azuketekure" Released: November 28, 1993; 4. "Hitomi Sorasanaide" Released: June 22, 1994

Deen is the debut studio album of Japanese rock band Deen. It was released on 14 September 1994 under recording label B-Gram Records.

Deen were the first band in the history of Japanese pop music to break the record for selling a million copies of a debut album and a debut single at the same time.

== Background ==
Album includes singles released between 1993 and 1994. Omitted singles as Tsubsa wo Hirogete, is included instead in their first compilation album Singles+1.

== Promotion ==
=== Singles ===
Their debut single Kono mama Kimi dake wo Ubaisaretai, was released on 10 March 1993. The single is written by vocalist of the rock band Wands, Show Uesugi and writer Tetsuro Oda. In the television, it was promoted as a commercial song to the mobile phone operator company NTT Docomo's Pocket Bell. The single debuted at number 2 on Oricon Single Weekly Charts, sold over one million copies and remained at number 12 on Oricon Yearly Single Charts in 1993. The single has received a golden disc award from the RIAJ.

Third single Memories, was released on the 22 September 1993. In the media it was promoted as an theme song to the Japanese television drama Neo Drama. English rap's lyrics in the intro of the song has never been published in the official lyric booklet. While in the recording version, the intro has been performed by writer Seiichiro Kuribayashi, in their live tours Ikemori performs it from ear copy. The single debuted at number 4 on Oricon Single Weekly Charts, charted 16 weeks and remained at number 67 on Oricon Yearly Single Charts in 1993.

Fourth single Eien wo Azuketekurete, was released on 28 November 1993. In this single, the following member of the band Shinji Tagawa has been involved with the recording. In the television, it served once again as a commercial song to the Docomo's Pocket Bell service. The single debuted at number 3 on Oricon Single Weekly Charts and remained on number 39 on Oricon Yearly Single Charts in 1994.

Fifth single Hitomi Sorasanaide, was released on 22 June 1994. In this single, guitarist Tagawa has become an official member. In the television, it was promoted as a commercial song to the sport drink brand Pocari Sweat. The single debuted at number 1 on Oricon Single Weekly Chart and remained at number 18 on Oricon Yearly Single Chart in 1994. It became their first single after year of debut to debut at number 1. The single has received a golden disc award from the RIAJ.

== Charting performance ==
The album debuted at number 1 On Oricon Album Weekly Charts. It charted for 23 weeks and remained at number 8 on Oricon Yearly Album Charts in 1994. The album sold 1,438,000 copies. The album has received a golden disc award from the RIAJ.

== Track listing ==
| No. | Title | Lyrics | Music | Arranger(s) | Length |
|---|---|---|---|---|---|
| 1. | "Hitomi Soranaide" (瞳そらさないで) | Izumi Sakai | Tetsurō Oda | Takeshi Hayama | 4:41 |
| 2. | "For My Life" | Ikemori | Shuuichi Ikemori | Daisuke Ikeda | 5:00 |
| 3. | "Keep on Dancin'" | Kanako Oda | Hirohito Furui; Kouji Yamane | Kousuke Ohshima (ex.Wands) | 4:18 |
| 4. | "Itsuka Kitto..." (いつかきっと…) | Ikemori | Seiichiro Kuribayashi | Hayama | 4:12 |
| 5. | "Omoi kiri Waratte" (思いきり笑って) | Daria Kawashima | Oda | Hayama | 4:42 |
| 6. | "Memories" | Ikemori | Oda | Hayama | 4:31 |
| 7. | "Kono Mama Kimi dake wo Ubaisaritai" (このまま君だけを奪い去りたい) | Show Uesugi (Wands) | Oda | Hayama | 4:41 |
| 8. | "Hiroi Sekai de Kimi to Deatta" (広い世界で君と出会った) | Ikemori | Oda | Hayama | 3:58 |
| 9. | "Forever" | Ikemori | Ikemori | Ohshima | 4:34 |
| 10. | "Koi ga Totsuzen Yomigaeru" (恋が突然よみがえる) | Sakai | Yamane | Furui | 4:28 |
| 11. | "Eien wo Azuketekure" (永遠をあずけてくれ) | Kawashima | Kuribayashi | Furui | 4:57 |

== Covers ==
Show Uesugi, vocalist of pop-rock band Wands covered Kono Mama Kimi dake wo Ubaisaritai in their 2nd studio album, Toki no Tobira in 1993. Zard covered Hitomi Sorasanaide in their 6th studio album Forever You in 1995. Writer Tetsuro Oda covered Kono Mama Kimi dake wo Ubaisaritai in his cover album Songs in 1993. Writer Seiichiro Kuribayashi covered in his studio album Tooku Hanaretemo in 1994.

== See also ==
- List of best-selling albums in Japan
