= Crawl (album) =

Studio album by Deen
- Released: 9 August 2010
- Recorded: 2010
- Genre: Japanese pop
- Length: 47:41
- Label: Ariola Japan
- Producer: Deen

Deen chronology
Lovers Concerto (2009)	Crawl (2010)	Graduation (2011)

Singles from Crawl
- 1. "coconuts feat. kokomo" Released: July 14, 2010

Crawl is the eleventh studio album by Japanese Pop band Deen. It was released on 9 August 2010 under music label Ariola Japan.

== Background ==
The album consists of only one previously released single, coconuts feat. kokomo.

Several songs, such as Hitomi Sorasanaide, received new version and instrumentation under title 2009+Ukulele Style; Gekkou no Nagisa and Blue eyes had received new rearrangement from the original version as well. Two tracks out of twelve are instrumental.

The band covered Anzen Chitai's 12th single Natsu no Owari no Harmony.

This album was released in two formats: regular CD edition and limited CD+DVD edition. The limited edition Natsu Best ~Deen Summer Time Melodies~ includes CD of the selected tracks with the new arrangement, including their biggest hits such as Tsubasa wo Hirogete and Kimi ga Inai Natsu, which would fit the concept of this album - summer.

== Charting performance ==
The album reached #23 in its first week and charted for 3 weeks, selling 7,297 copies.

== Track listing ==
All lyrics are written by Shuuichi Ikeda (expect of #10 by Izumi Sakai (Zard), #12 by Yousui Inoue (Anzen Chitai))

No.	Title	Music	Arranger(s)	Length
1.	"coconuts feat. kokomo"	Kouji Yamane	Kouji Yamane	4:29
2.	"Surf on the weekend"	Shinji Tagawa	Shinji Tagawa	4:00
3.	"Happiness" (ハピネス)	Tagawa	Tagawa	3:32
4.	"Gekkou no Nagisa ~Brilliant Style~" (月光の渚 〜Brilliant Style〜)	Tagawa	Tagawa	4:49
5.	"Morning Breeze" (instrumental)	Tagawa	Tagawa	1:09
6.	"Jidousha Race" (自転車レース)	Yamane	Yamane	3:51
7.	"Natsu no Ame" (夏の雨)	Yamane	Yamane	5:18
8.	"Passing by a Lady" (instrumental)	Tagawa	Tagawa	0:56
9.	"Blue eyes 〜Strings Style〜"	Yamane	Kouichirou Tokinori	5:18
10.	"Hitomi Sorasanaide ~2009+Ukulele Style~" (瞳そらさないで)	Tetsurō Oda	Tagawa	5:20
11.	"Himawari no Saku Oka" (向日葵の咲く丘)	Yamane	Yamane	4:38
12.	"Natsu no Owari no Harmony" (夏の終りのハーモニー, cover song by Anzen Chitai)	Kouji Tamaki	Deen	5:28

== In media ==
- Jidousha Race - commercial song for The Kagoshima Bank
