= Circle (Deen album) =

Studio album by Deen
- Released: 18 December 2013
- Recorded: 2013
- Genre: Japanese pop
- Length: 45:18
- Label: Epic Records Japan
- Producer: DEEN

Deen chronology
Marriage (2012)	Circle (2013)	Zenkai Koigokoro!! ~Missing you~ (2015)

Singles from Circle
- 1. "Hatachi/Ame no Roppongi" Released: August 7, 2013; 2. "Mou Nakanaide" Released: November 27, 2013

Circle is the fourteenth studio album by Japanese Pop band Deen. It was released on 18 December 2013 under the new label Epic Records Japan.

== Background ==
The album consists of two previously released single, Hatachi/Ame no Roppongi and Mou Nakanaide. Mou Nakanaide's coupling song Future had received new arrangement under title Album Version.

Kouji Yamane's new song of Shangai Rock Star series had been released in this album as well.

For the first time after four years, they collaborated again with the Paris Match on the song Peace & Smile.

Hirohito Furui, ex-member of Japanese pop band Garnet Crow was involved in a Deen album production for the first time after 15 years.

This album was released in two formats: regular CD edition and limited CD+DVD edition. The limited edition includes DVD footage of their live performance Deen Aor Night Cruisin' ~2nd GROOVE~.

== Charting ==
The album reached #21 in its first week and charted for 3 weeks, selling 5,000+ copies.

== Track listing ==
No.	Title	Lyrics	Music	Arranger(s)	Length
1.	"Hatachi" (二十歳)	Shuuichi Ikeda	Shinji Tagawa	Shinji Tagawa	5:07
2.	"Peace & Smile! feat. paris match"	Shuuichi Ikeda, Tai Furusawa	Shinji Tagawa	Yousuke Sugiyama	4:33
3.	"Mou Nakanaide" (もう泣かないで)	Shuuichi Ikeda, Daria Kawashima (Feel so bad)	Kouji Yamane	Hirohito Furui (ex.Garnet Crow)	3:29
4.	"Konya ha Party Night!" (今夜はParty Night!)	Shuuichi Ikeda	Kouji Yamane	Kouji Yamane	4:33
5.	"Future" (Album version)	Shuuichi Ikeda	Kouji Yamane	Kouji Yamane	3:43
6.	"Twist of fate"	Shuuichi Ikeda	Shinji Tagawa	Shinji Tagawa	3:24
7.	"Ame no Roppongi" (雨の六本木)	Reiko Yukawa	Daisuke Inoue	Daisuke Ikeda	4:45
8.	"My Life My Dreams"	Shuuichi Ikeda, Shin Kibayashi	Shinji Tagawa	Shinji Tagawa	4:26
9.	"Eien no Jeanne d'Arc" (永遠のジャンヌダルク)	Reiko Yukawa	Shinji Tagawa	Tsutomu Oohira	3:46
10.	"Dance Fever ~Shanghai Rock Star Gaiden~" (DANCE FEVER 〜上海ロックスター外伝〜)	Kouji Yamane	Kouji Yamane	Kouji Yamane	4:24
11.	"Circle ~Anata ga itakara koso~" (CIRCLE 〜あなたがいたからこそ〜)	Shuuichi Ikeda	Kouji Yamane	Daisuke Ikeda	3:12
