= Chocho =

Chocho may refer to:

== People ==
- Chocho people, an indigenous people of Mexico
  - Chocho language, their language
- Chōcho, a Japanese singer
- Andrés Chocho, an Ecuadorian race walker
- Cho Cho, First Lady of Myanmar

== Plants ==
- Andean lupin (Lupinus mutabilis, an edible bean)
- Chayote (Sechium edule, an edible squash)
  - Chocho, a synonym of the genus Sechium
- Horse-eye beans (Ormosia, not edible)

== Other ==
- Chocho zubon (Japanese tobi trousers)
- Chōchō (蝶々), butterflies in Japanese
