= El Taller =

Gay bar in Mexico City

El Taller ("The Workshop") is a gay bar in the basement of Calle Florencia 37, in the Zona Rosa of Mexico City. It was opened on 16 June 1986 by the writer Luis González de Alba, one of the leaders of the 1968 student movement. For its first decades it admitted only men, who came in jeans and white T-shirts, and it had a machine-shop decor and a dark room. From 1987 it held weekly talks on AIDS and sexuality, the "Martes del Taller". It closed in 2013 and was later reopened by the owners of the Cabaré-Tito bars; as of 2026 it is called El Taller Bar Gay by Cabaré-Tito.

== History ==
=== El Vaquero ===
Before El Taller, González de Alba and his partner Ernesto Bañuelos opened La Tienda del Vaquero, a sex shop and bookstore, which later became a bar, La Cantina del Vaquero. In a 1998 interview with Proceso he called El Vaquero the first bar in Mexico just for gay men. Its dress code, jeans and no cologne, was copied from the Mineshaft in New York. In 1985 a study of HIV prevalence was carried out among its customers. Sources give its opening as 1983 and place it on Algeciras street in Insurgentes Mixcoac or on Insurgentes Sur.

=== Opening ===
In mid-1985 González de Alba found the space for El Taller, a basement on Florencia street a block and a half from the Angel of Independence, "with no lights and a plague of rodents". He wrote that his partners at first were Daniel Escalante and Andreas Zeiby; Escalante dropped out, and Zeiby suggested the name. Other accounts name Ernesto Bañuelos as co-founder. González de Alba later wrote that the bar "came from Paris", where he had spent a sabbatical from the UNAM. The borough chief, Enrique Jackson, at first refused it a license. González de Alba then presented the project as a "sociocultural" center with an AIDS program, and the bar was registered as a civil association rather than as a nightclub.

El Taller opened on 16 June 1986, during the 1986 FIFA World Cup. Women were not allowed in; González de Alba wrote that no women would enter, "of either sex". The door was selective, and effeminate men who did not fit the Tom of Finland type could be turned away. Time Out later called it the first men-only club in Mexico City, and its regulars wore moustaches, tight jeans and leather jackets "a la Village People". González de Alba described the crowd to Proceso as "homosexuals dressed as workers", served by staff in overalls.

=== 1980s and 1990s ===
The decor matched the name: gears, anchors and cable reels, a non-slip rubber floor, and a dark room. González de Alba also had sound-absorbing paste put on the walls. The historian Alonso Hernández calls it one of the cradles of the city's leather community, and a 2020 study of gay bars in Guadalajara names it among the first dark rooms in the country. Men took off their T-shirts to dance.

The music was electronic. DJs Carlos "Charly" Mendoza and Genaro Konstantinos played Depeche Mode, Front 242 and New Order, and DJ Martin Parra says he brought acid house records there from 1987. The writer Wenceslao Bruciaga calls El Taller a pioneer of the rave movement in Mexico.

Not everyone in the gay community approved. The poet Juan Carlos Bautista, owner of the bar Marrakech, and the activist José María Covarrubias were among its critics. Once a consumer-protection inspector who was refused entry closed the bar for three days, until her superior had the seals removed. Bruciaga says the pressure was worst while Dolores Padierna headed the Cuauhtémoc borough (2000–2003): "it was a hunt against the bar".

=== Closure and reopening ===
By the 2000s the crowd was older; a 2013 study described it as mostly men over 30. In March 2013 Time Out reported that El Taller had lost ground in the "avalanche" of new gay clubs, had closed for good, and had then reopened with its dark room restored and its walls painted yellow and black. Other sources give 2013 as the year it closed, though a visitor in 2015 found it still open. The space was then taken over by the Cabaré-Tito group of David Rangel and the actor Tito Vasconcelos, which opened Cabaretito Neón at "Florencia 37, formerly El Taller" by August 2016. González de Alba died on 2 October 2016, and a black bow was hung on the door of El Almacén.

In 2018 Chilango called the bar "El Taller/El Nuevo Cabaretito Neón" and said the Cabaretito owners had rescued it. As of 2026 it runs as El Taller Bar Gay by Cabaré-Tito, at Florencia 37-A, open every night with drag shows and go-go dancers; in 2026 it advertised its 40th anniversary. Sundays are men only, with a cruising area; on other nights the crowd is mixed.

== Los Martes del Taller ==
On 14 April 1987 El Taller began a series of free Tuesday talks on AIDS and sexuality, run with the groups Guerrilla Gay, led by the anthropologist Xabier Lizárraga, and Cálamo, led by Alejandro Meza. The talks started at 8 p.m., lasted two hours and ran for about ten years. The political scientist Jordi Diez calls El Taller "one of the most legendary gay bars" and says that by the late 1980s the talks had 20 volunteer professionals and more than 60 members. In 1996 Guerrilla Gay and Palomilla Gay were still meeting there on Tuesdays at 9 p.m. The bar also helped pay for the Fundación Mexicana para la Lucha contra el Sida for years. Tito Vasconcelos took part in the Tuesdays. After later changes of management the talks left Florencia, and in 2017 their 30th anniversary was held at the Voces en Tinta bookstore.

== El Almacén ==
El Almacén ("The Warehouse"), at street level at Florencia 37-B, is connected to the basement through the restrooms. Unlike El Taller it admitted women; Time Out called it El Taller's buga (straight) bar, and most of its patrons were over 35. A 2013 study dates its opening to 1997, but the radio program Medianoche en Babilonia already celebrated its anniversary "from the premises of El Almacén" on 8 September 1996 and made its last broadcast there on 7 September 1997. El Almacén was closed for a time and reopened in July 2012. As of 2026 it is a drag bar.

== Claims to be first ==
Sources disagree on whether El Taller was a first. Chilango called it the city's first gay bar, Time Out the first men-only club, and La Hoja de Arena the first "rough" gay bar, while others call it one of the first openly gay bars in Mexico. González de Alba himself gave that title to El Vaquero, and a history of the city's gay bars lists earlier ones, from El Safari in the 1960s to El Nueve (1977). José Alfonso Suárez del Real wrote that El Taller "revolutionized the nightlife of the Zona Rosa".

== See also ==
- LGBTQ culture in Mexico City
- Zona Rosa, Mexico City
- Gay bar
