= Marriage (Deen album) =

Studio album by Deen
- Released: 8 August 2012
- Recorded: 2012
- Genre: Japanese pop
- Length: 41:19
- Label: Ariola Japan
- Producer: DEEN

Deen chronology
Graduation (2011)	Marriage (2012)	Circle (2013)

Singles from Marriage
- 1. "Kokoro kara Kimi ga Suki ~Marriage~" Released: June 27, 2012

Marriage is the thirteenth studio album by Japanese Pop band Deen. It was released on 8 August 2012 under the Ariola Japan label.

== Album ==
The album consists of only one previously released single, Kokoro kara Kimi ga Suki ~Marriage~. This single, its B-side, Ame ga Itsuka Agaruyouni and Flower, the B-side for the single Brand New Wing received new arrangements for this album under the sub-titles Album mix.

For this album the band collaborated with the famous Japanese novelist Shin Kibayashi who wrote lyrics for them (with help of Shuuichi Ikeda) for four of the ten songs on the album.

The album was released in two formats: regular CD edition and limited CD+DVD edition. The limited edition includes DVD footage of their live performance Deen Live Joy -Break16- ~Graduation Party~.

After finishing recording of this album, they moved to the new music label Epic Records Japan.

== Chart performance ==
The album debuted at No. 23 and charted for 3 weeks, selling over 5,000 copies.

== Track listing ==
All lyrics are written by Shuuichi Ikeda (except of #1,3-5, by Shin Kibayashi)

No.	Title	Music	Arranger(s)	Length
1.	"Kokoro kara Kimi ga Suki ~Marriage~ <Album mix>" (心から君が好き〜マリアージュ〜)	Shinji Tagawa	Tagawa	5:06
2.	"Shining so Beautiful"	Tagawa	Tagawa	4:26
3.	"Kami no Shizuku" (神の雫)	Kouji Yamane	Yamane	4:48
4.	"Harinezumi no Dillema" (ハリネズミのジレンマ)	Tagawa	Tagawa	4:10
5.	"Ame ga Itsuka Agaruyouni <Album mix>" (雨がいつか上がるように)	Yamane	Yamane	4:19
6.	"Rio no Kaze" (リオの風)	Tagawa	Tagawa	4:08
7.	"Come on!"	Yamane	Yamane	3:13
8.	"Among the stars"	Tagawa	Tagawa	3:09
9.	"Flower <Album mix>"	Yamane	Yamane	3:30
10.	"Road to My Life"	Tagawa	Tagawa	4:34
11.	"Kimi he no Love Song" (君へのlove song)	Tagawa	Tagawa	3:50
