= Road Cruisin' =

Studio album by Deen
- Released: 18 August 2004
- Recorded: 2004
- Genre: Japanese pop
- Length: 50:51
- Label: BMG Funhouse
- Producer: DEEN

Deen chronology
Utopia (2003)	Road Cruisin' (2004)	Diamonds (2006)

Singles from Road Cruisin'
- 1. "Rail no nai Sora e" Released: April 28, 2004; 2. "Strong Soul" Released: June 30, 2004

Road Cruisin' is the seventh studio album by Japanese Pop band Deen. It was released on 18 August 2004 under BMG Funhouse.

The album consists of two previously released singles, Rail no nai Sora e and Taiyou to Hanabira and Strong Soul. This is the first Deen album to be released in two formats: regular CD edition and limited CD+DVD edition. In DVD disc are included music videoclips of the singles "Rail no nai Sora e" and "Strong Soul".

The album reached #13 in its first week and charted for 3 weeks, selling 19,000 copies.

== Track listing ==
All lyrics are written by Shuuichi Ikeda

No.	Title	Music	Arranger(s)	Length
1.	"Rail no nai Sora e" (レールのない空へ)	Hiroyuki Suzuki	Hiroyuki Suzuki, DEEN	4:58
2.	"Route 466"	Yasuaki Maejima	DEEN	4:31
3.	"Strong Soul"	Kouji Yamane	Kouichirou Tokinori, DEEN	4:16
4.	"Ocean"	Hiroyuki Suzuki	Hiroyuki Suzuki, DEEN	4:53
5.	"Ashita e no Off Road" (明日へのOFF ROAD)	Kei Yoshikawa	Kouichirou Tokinori, DEEN	4:23
6.	"Minami no Kaze" (南の風)	Ikemori Shuuichi, Kouichirou Tokinori	Kouichirou Tokinori, DEEN	4:17
7.	"Gekkou no Nagisa" (月光の渚)	Shinji Tagawa	DEEN	4:10
8.	"Good Good Time!!"	Shinji Tagawa	DEEN	4:05
9.	"Miracle Boy!" (ミラクル ボーイ!)	Shinji Tagawa	DEEN	4:10
10.	"Ameagari no Sora, Kono Michi wo Ikou" (雨上がりの空、この道を行こう)	Tanatonote	DEEN	4:13
11.	"Tooi hi no Shabon Tama" (遠い日のシャボン玉)	Tanatonote	DEEN	3:14
12.	"Uta ni Negai wo ~Song for you~" (歌に願いを 〜SONG FOR YOU〜)	Masayuki Shioda	DEEN	3:47

== In media ==
- Ocean - ending theme for Nihon TV program NNN Kyou no Dekikoto
- Strong Soul - theme song for 35th anniversary of Tokyo Verdy 1969
