= Zenkai Koigokoro!! ~Missing you~ =

Studio album by Deen
- Released: 29 July 2015
- Recorded: 2014–2015
- Genre: Japanese pop
- Length: 49:27
- Label: Epic Records Japan
- Producer: DEEN

Deen chronology
Circle (2013)	Zenkai Koigokoro!! ~Missing you~ (2015)	Butterfly (2016)

Singles from Zenkai Koigokoro!! ~Missing you~
- 1. "Kimi ga Boku wo Wasurenai you ni Boku ga Kimi wo Oboeteiru" Released: October 1, 2014; 2. "Sen Kai Koigokoro" Released: June 24, 2015

Zenkai Koigokoro!! ~Missing you~ (romaji for 全開恋心) is the fifteenth studio album by Japanese Pop band Deen. It was released on 29 July 2015 under the Epic Records Japan label.

== Background ==
The album consists of two previously released singles, Kimi ga Boku wo Wasurenai you ni Boku ga Kimi wo Oboeteiru and Sen Kai Koigokoro!. Both of these singles and coupling song Ari no Mama Dakishimeyou (from 42nd single) had received new arrangement under the title Zenkai Mix.

Kouji Yamane's new song of Shangai Rock Star series had been released in this album as well. Emerald Ocean is the original and the first song performed by composer Shinji Tagawa.

This album was released in two formats: regular CD edition and limited CD+DVD-edition. The limited edition includes DVD footage of their live performance Deen Live Joy Countdown Special ~Maniac Night W('0')W~.

== Charts ==
The album reached No. 23 in its first week and charted for 3 weeks, selling over 4,500 copies.

== Track listing ==
All lyrics are written by Shuuichi Ikeda (expect #6 (Shinji Tagawa) and #10 (Kouji Yamane)

No.	Title	Music	Arranger(s)	Length
1.	"Kimi ga Boku wo Wasurenai you ni Boku ga Kimi wo Oboeteiru <Zenkai Mix>" (君が僕を忘れないように 僕が君をおぼえている)	Kouji Yamane	Kouji Yamane	4:23
2.	"Senkai Koigokoro! <Zenkai Mix>" (千回恋心!)	Shinji Tagawa	Shinji Tagawa	4:20
3.	"Smiling" (スマイリン)	Shinji Tagawa	Shinji Tagawa	4:39
4.	"Kimi no Egao wo Kanjinagara" (君の笑顔を感じながら)	Shinji Tagawa	Shinji Tagawa	4:22
5.	"Ame Michi..." (雨道…)	Kouji Yamane	Kouji Yamane	3:43
6.	"Emerald Ocean"	Shinji Tagawa	Shinji Tagawa	6:15
7.	"Jet Coaster" (ジェットコースター)	Kouji Yamane	Kouji Yamane	3:52
8.	"Hibiscus" (ハイビスカス)	Shinji Tagawa	Shinji Tagawa	4:18
9.	"Ari no Mama Dakishimeyou <Zenkai Mix>" (ありのまま抱きしめよう)	Shinji Tagawa	Shinji Tagawa	5:05
10.	"Wild Road Dreamers ~Shanghai Rock Star Episode 1.5 (High School edition)~" (Wild Road Dreamers 〜上海ロックスター Episode1.5 (High School編)〜)	Kouji Yamane	Kouji Yamane	5:03
11.	"with"	Kouji Yamane	Kouji Yamane	3:12
