= Stephen Butterfill =

British philosopher

Education
- Education: Oxford University (PhD)
- Thesis: Beliefs and how they are acquired (2003)
- Doctoral advisor: Bill Brewer, David Charles, Martin Davies

Philosophical work
- Era: 21st-century philosophy
- Region: Western philosophy
- School: Analytic
- Institutions: St John's College, Cambridge; University of Warwick
- Main interests: Philosophical psychology, Cognitive development, Joint action, Mindreading, Social cognition
- Website: http://www.butterfill.com/

Stephen Andrew Butterfill is a British philosopher and Professor of Philosophy at the University of Warwick. He is known for his research on philosophical issues in cognitive and developmental psychology. Previously he was a Fellow of St John's College, Cambridge.

== Personal life ==
He lives in Southampton, UK with his wife Elisabeth Schroeder-Butterfill (Lecturer in Gerontology at the University of Southampton) and four children.

== Books ==
- The Developing Mind: A Philosophical Introduction, Routledge, 2010, ISBN 9780415566230
- Tool Use and Causal Cognition, edited with Teresa McCormack and Christoph Hoerl, Oxford University Press, 2012, ISBN 9780199571154
