= Koço =

Koço is a masculine given name of Albanian origin. Notable people with the name include:

== Given name ==
- Koço Barka (1954–2024), Albanian politician
- Koço Dinella (born 1947), Albanian footballer
- Koço Kasapoğlu (1935–2016), Greek-Turkish football player and manager
- Koço Muka (1895–1954), Albanian politician
- Koço Qendro (1927–2026), Albanian actor
- Koço Tasi, Albanian politician
- Koço Theodhosi (1913–1977), Albanian politician
- Koço Uçi (1923–1982), Albanian composer
