= Butterflies (Patti Page song) =

Song by Patti Page
- Released: 1953
- Songwriter: Bob Merrill

"Butterflies" is a popular song, written by Bob Merrill and recorded by Patti Page in 1953.

It was released by Mercury Records as catalog number 70183.

It entered on the Billboard chart on July 18, 1953 and lasted 10 weeks, peaking at number 10. On the Cash Box charts, it peaked at number 11.
