= Lovers Concerto (album) =

Studio album by Deen
- Released: 2 December 2009
- Recorded: 2009
- Genre: Japanese pop
- Length: 49:36
- Label: Ariola Japan
- Producer: DEEN

Deen chronology
Deen Next Stage (2009)	Lovers Concerto (2009)	Crawl (2010)

Singles from Lovers Concerto
- 1. "Celebrate" Released: April 29, 2009; 2. "Negai" Released: November 4, 2009

Lovers Concerto is the tenth studio album by Japanese pop band Deen. It was released on 2 December 2009 under Ariola Japan.

== Background ==
This is the band’s first release under music label Ariola Japan.

== Album ==
The album consists of two previously released singles, Celebrate and Negai. Both of those singles have received special album rearrangement under the subtitle “Album version”.

The album was released in two formats: regular CD edition and limited CD+DVD edition. The limited edition is for the first time released in Blu-spec CD format. In DVD disc is the footage of their live performance Deen Unplugged Summer Resort Live '09.

== Chart performance ==
The album reached No. 21 in its first week and charted for 3 weeks, selling over 8,000 copies.

== Track listing ==
All lyrics are written by Shuuichi Ikeda

No.	Title	Music	Arranger(s)	Length
1.	"Negai feat.Mari Mizuno from paris match" (album version)	Kouji Yamane	Kouji Yamane	5:15
2.	"Serenade" (セレナーデ)	Shinji Tagawa	Shinji Tagawa	4:24
3.	"Gosenshino Love song feat. Emiri Miyamoto" (五線紙のラヴソング)	Yamane	Yamane	5:36
4.	"Glory day feat. Junko Itou"	Yamane	Steve Good	4:24
5.	"Celebrate" (album version)	Yamane	Yamane, Kouichirou Tokinori	4:06
6.	"harukaze feat.paris match"	Shuuichi Ikemori, Tokinori	Yousuke Sugiyama	4:20
7.	"Kimi Sarishi Christmas" (君去りしクリスマス)	Tagawa	Tagawa	4:30
8.	"Shiawase ni narou" (幸せになろう)	Tagawa	Tagawa	4:00
9.	"Soba ni Iru kara feat. Kubo Takezawa, Yagi Wataru" (そばにいるから)	Ikemori, Tokinori	Tokinori	4:05
10.	"A Lover's Concerto" (instrumental)	Tagawa	Tagawa	2:53
11.	"Hoshi Furu Yoru, Kono Hoshi de" (星降る夜、この星で)	Tagawa	Tagawa	5:28

== In media ==
- Celebrate - ending theme for Tokyo Broadcasting System Television program Megami Search
