= Kocho Angjushev =

Macedonian businessman (born 1969)

Deputy Prime Minister for economic affairs
- In office 1 June 2017 – 3 January 2020
- Prime Minister: Zoran Zaev
- Preceded by: Vladimir Peshevski

Personal details
- Born: 20 June 1969 (age 57) Veles, SR Macedonia, SFR Yugoslavia
- Education: Ss. Cyril and Methodius
- Occupation: Businessman, university professor, philanthropist

Kocho Angjushev (born June 20, 1969) is a Macedonian businessman, university professor, and former Deputy Prime Minister of the Government of North Macedonia responsible for economic affairs (2017–2020).

== Early life ==
Kocho Angjushev was born in Veles on June 20, 1969, into an average Macedonian family. His parents were administrative workers at the Veles textile factory "Noncha Kamishova," which collapsed in the early 1990s along with many other state-owned enterprises. Several generations before World War II, his ancestors were involved in entrepreneurship, factory ownership, and trade. However, the Angjushev family's property was nationalized in 1945 by the new socialist government.

Kocho Angjushev completed his primary and secondary education in Veles as an excellent student. He graduated as a mechanical technician and, in 1988, enrolled in the Faculty of Mechanical Engineering at the state University "Ss. Cyril and Methodius" in Skopje. In 1992, Angjushev graduated from the Faculty of Mechanical Engineering, completing his degree a year ahead of schedule.

== Academic career ==
From 1996, he was a scientific researcher at the Faculty of Mechanical Engineering in Aachen, Germany, where he prepared his doctoral dissertation titled "The Influence of Vibrations in Linkage and Cam Mechanisms on Their Kinematic Functions."

In 1998, he obtained his Ph.D. at the "Ss. Cyril and Methodius" University in the field of mechanics and machine dynamics. At the time, Angjushev was the youngest recipient of a Ph.D. in technical sciences in the country.

After obtaining his Ph.D., he was elected assistant professor and later full professor at the Faculty of Mechanical Engineering in Skopje, where he still teaches today.

In 1999, he expanded his academic experience as a visiting professor at Loughborough University, England, in the field of machine dynamics.

Angjushev has authored more than 100 scientific papers published in international and domestic scientific symposia and journals.

Under his leadership, more than 50 industrial projects have been implemented in the fields of mechanical engineering and energy.

== Managerial and business career ==
From 2000 to 2002, Angjushev was the assistant to the general director of the state-owned energy company Electric Power Company of Macedonia (ESM), where he was responsible for electricity production and distribution system management. (These segments are now under the jurisdiction of the Power Plants of North Macedonia and MEPSO.) In 2003, Angjushev founded Ferro Invest and BRAKO, two of the largest companies in Macedonia, leading in renewable energy, the metal-processing industry, and the production of specialized vehicles for urban hygiene.

After leaving EFT, he founded his own electricity trading company, EDS, in 2012, which was acquired by the Greek state-owned electricity company PPC in 2019.

Angjushev served as the vice president of the Economic Chamber of North Macedonia. In 2024, on the occasion of the Chamber's 101st anniversary, he received the Award for Contribution to Export Development and Workforce Education for Business Needs.

== Political career ==
From 2017 to 2020, Kocho Angjushev served as Deputy Prime Minister for Economic Affairs in the government of North Macedonia, led by Zoran Zaev.

During his government tenure, Angjushev donated his salary to impoverished families, as per a list prepared by the Ministry of Labor and Social Policy. He voluntarily stepped down as Deputy Prime Minister in January 2020, citing his intention to return to private sector initiatives.

== Corporate social responsibility ==
Angjushev was the president of FK Borec.

Angjushev personally supported the Faculty of Music Arts in Skopje by donating a concert piano for the educational activities of the students. The donation was promoted with a concert by the Macedonian pianist Simon Trpcheski, organized by the Austrian Ambassador to Skopje, Martin Pammer.
