= Deen Next Stage =

Studio album by Deen
- Released: 25 February 2009
- Recorded: 2007–2009
- Genre: Japanese pop
- Length: 59:57
- Label: BMG Japan
- Producer: DEEN

Deen chronology
Diamonds (2006)	Deen Next Stage (2009)	Lovers Concerto (2009)

Singles from Deen Next Stage
- 1. "Eien no Ashita" Released: December 10, 2008

Deen Next Stage is the ninth studio album by Japanese pop band Deen. It was released on 25 February 2009 under BMG Japan.

== Background ==
The release gap between this album and Deen's previous album Diamonds is two and a half years. It marks the biggest release gap of recording in their whole career.

The album consists of only one previously released single, Eien no Ashita.

Leader Kouji Yamane will perform in the album his solo song "Lonely Wolf".

Leading track Eien no Ashita has received special ballad version exclusively for this album.

This album was released in two formats: regular CD edition and limited CD+DVD edition. In DVD disc is countdown live from their performance Deen Live Joy Break-13~Next Stage~.

This is their last album which was released under BMG Japan. On their next album Lovers Concerto, they moved to different music label, Ariola Japan.

== Charting performance ==
The album reached #16 in its first week and charted for 3 weeks, selling 12,000 copies.

== Track listing ==
All lyrics are written by Shuuichi Ikeda (expect #11, by Kouji Yamane).

No.	Title	Music	Arranger(s)	Length
1.	"Eien no Ashita" (永遠の明日)	Shuuichi Ikemori	DEEN, Kouichirou Tokinori	4:55
2.	"Natsu no Tsubasa" (夏の翼)	Tagawa	Tagawa	4:43
3.	"Ashita e Keri dase" (明日へ蹴り出せ)	Ikemori, Tokinori	Steve Good	4:39
4.	"Little Hero" (リトル・ヒーロー)	Tagawa	Tagawa	4:41
5.	"Nostal ~Tooi Yakusoku~" (ノスタル〜遠い約束〜)	Kouji Yamane	Kouji Yamane	4:52
6.	"Ikou yo!" (行こうよ！)	Ikemori, Tokinori	Ikemori, Tokinori	4:20
7.	"Namida no Melody" (涙のメロディー)	Yamane	Yamane	4:10
8.	"I Break My Heart"	Yamane, Tagawa, Tokinori	Tagawa	4:36
9.	"Dance with my Music featuring JtoS"	Yamane, Ikemori	Steve Good	4:59
10.	"You & I"	Tagawa	Tagawa	4:24
11.	"Lonely Wolf ~Shanghai Rock Star Episode 3~" (ロンリーウルフ〜上海ロックスター Episode3〜)	Yamane, Ikemori	DEEN, Tokinori	4:17
12.	"Uta ni narou" (歌になろう)	Tagawa	Tagawa	4:49
13.	"Eien no Ashita" (ballad version)	Ikemori	DEEN, Tokinori	4:38

== In media ==
- Eien no Ashita - theme song for Nintendo DS game Tales of Hearts
