= Parade (Deen album) =

Studio album by Deen
- Released: 9 August 2017
- Recorded: 2015–2017
- Genre: Japanese pop
- Length: 48:40
- Label: Epic Records Japan
- Producer: DEEN

Deen chronology
Butterfly (2016)	Parade (2017)	Deen The Best Forever Complete Singles+ (2018)

Singles from Parade
- 1. "Zutto Tsutaetakatta I Love You" Released: October 7, 2015; 2. "Kimi he no Parade" Released: May 24, 2017

Parade is the seventeenth studio album by Japanese pop band Deen. It was released on 9 August 2017 under the Epic Records Japan label.

== Album ==
The album was released as "25th debut anniversary's memorial album."

=== Included songs ===
It contains two previously released singles, Zutto Tsutaetakatta I Love You (ずっと伝えたかった I love you) and "Kimi he no Parade" (君へのパレード♪). Both these tracks and the previously released B-side song Shounen (from their single Love Forever, 1995) received renewed album mixes and recordings with subtitles Album version and Parade Style.

The track Kizuna was released as a digital single the week before the main album's release. A former member of the Japanese pop band Garnet Crow, Hirohito Furui, participated in the recording production as an arranger (along with Kimi he no Parade) for the first time since 2013.

The band’s only 2016 single, Kioku no Kage didn't make it in this album, but was instead included in their compilation album DEEN The Best FOREVER Complete Singles++.

Shinji and Kouji both perform their own original songs Sensual Blues and Summer boy's tears on the album.

=== Formats ===
The album was released in three formats: regular CD edition and limited A/B CD+DVD edition. The limited A edition includes BD footage of their live performance Deen Live Joy - Countdown Special- ~Maniac Night~ Vol.3. The limited B edition includes DVD with two music video clips from the album included singles and their making shoots.

== Charts ==
The album debuted at No. 22 and charted for 3 weeks.

== Track listing ==
All lyrics are written by Shuuichi Ikemori

No.	Title	Music	Arranger(s)	Length
1.	"Kimi he no Parade (君へのパレード♪)" (Album Version)	Kouji Yamane	Hirohito Furui (ex.Garnet Crow)	4:41
2.	"Zutto Tsutaetakatta I love you (ずっと伝えたかった I love you)" (Parade Style)	Shinji Tagawa	Tagawa	4:58
3.	"Mystery-na Girl (ミステリーなガール)"	Yamane	Yamane	3:21
4.	"Te Amo"	Tagawa	Tagawa	4:48
5.	"Shounen (少年)" (Parade Style)	Tagawa, Yamane	Yamane	4:53
6.	"Summer Song (サマーソング)"	Yamane	Yamane	3:47
7.	"Catch her Heart"	Tagawa	Tagawa	4:14
8.	"Sensual Blues" (instrumental)	Tagawa	Tagawa	3:09
9.	"Summer boy's tears"	Yamane	Yamane	4:12
10.	"Oh my friend"	Tagawa	Tagawa	5:26
11.	"Kizuna (キズナ)" (digital single)	Yamane	Furui	4:26
