= Deen (band) =

Japanese rock band (1992-)

- Origin: Japan
- Genres: Pop; pop rock; classical; folk; album-oriented rock
- Years active: 1992–present
- Labels: B-Gram Records (1993–1998); BMG Japan/Berg (1998–2003); BMG Japan (2003–2009); Ariola Japan/Sony Music Entertainment Japan (2009–2013); Epic Records Japan (2013–)
- Members: Shuichi Ikemori; Koji Yamane
- Past members: Naoki Uzumoto; Tatsumi Nakai; Keisuke Kurasawa; Shinji Tagawa
- Website: www.deen.gr.jp

Deen

YouTube information
- Channel: Deen Official YouTube Channel
- Years active: 2013–present
- Subscribers: 55,3 thousand (August 6, 2024)
- Views: 47.6 million (August 6, 2024)

Deen (ディーン, Dīn) is a Japanese popular music band that formed in 1992. Members frequently changed until the release of the first album, and from there Deen has had four members: vocalist and lyricist Shuichi Ikemori, keyboardist and leader Koji Yamane, guitarist Shinji Tagawa and drummer Naoki Uzumoto. In January 2000, Utsumoto and in March 2018, Tagawa left the group. The band has sold over 15 million compact discs.

== History ==
=== Origin and early years (1992–1997) ===
In the "Being" agency, Show Wesugi (original vocalist with Wands) and Tetsurō Oda made song "Konomama Kimidake wo Ubaisaritai" (lit. "Now, I want to make off with only you"). The group was formed for singing this song. The band debuted with the single on March 10, 1993. The single was certified a million-seller by the Recording Industry Association of Japan (RIAJ). Their 1994 song "Hitomi Sorasanaide" (lit. "Don't Avert Your Eyes"), written by Izumi Sakai and Tetsurō Oda, reached number-one position on the Japanese Oricon charts. Their first album Deen was also certified a million-seller by RIAJ.

The group originally seemed to be just a project, but they began to perform live concerts in 1996. They also began to release their self-produced singles, but their sales declined. Their 1997 song "Yume de Aru Youni" (lit. "Hope that it will be a dream"), written by themselves, was adopted by Tales of Destiny. It was no longer able to reach Top 10 on the Oricon charts. But for fans, this song remained most popular over a decade.

=== 1998–2017 ===
In 1998, the band partly moved to BMG Japan under the Berg label, which consisted of the "Being" agency artists. Since their 1999 single "Just One", almost all singles have been produced by them, but Utsumoto left Deen in 2000. They introduced classical music into their music. In 2002, they released a cover version of Kyu Sakamoto's "Miagete Goran Yoru no Hoshi o", featuring solo violinist Diana Yukawa. They began to call their style "Neo-AOR" after album Pray.

The band completely moved from the "being" agency to BMG Japan in 2003. Their next album Utopia, released on November 5, 2003, enlisted the help of Al Schmitt. In 2006, baseball manager Bobby Valentine participated in the music video of their song "Diamond".

On June 8, 2008, they performed their first live concert at the Nippon Budokan. On December 10, 2008, they released the single "Eien no Ashita" (lit. "Eternal Tomorrow"), adopted by Tales of Hearts. The single debuted at #6 on the Oricon weekly single charts. It was their highest position after 1996.

=== 2018–present ===
On January 12, 2018, the guitarist and composer Tagawa has announced withdrawal from the band after 25th anniversary Budoukan Live finishes, which makes now left only two members keyboardist Yamane and vocalist Ikemori. On February 28 they released compilation album DEEN The Best FOREVER Complete Singles+ as part of their 25th debut anniversary, which will include their final song as 3 members "Journey". In August they've released three digital singles which includes completely new song Aloha and rearrangement of famous hits as Hitomi Sorasanaide and Power of Love with subtitle Jawaiian Style. On December 26 they've released 25th music video and blu-ray live footage Deen Live Joy Countdown Special: Solo! Solo!! Solo!!!, it's also final work there former guitarist Tagawa is included as a member.

Since December 31, 2018 until January 13, 2019 the band held their Live Joy Break tour Deen Live Joy Break 21: Best Songs 21 Years. On February 6, the band as two-member will release their single Mirai Kara no Hikari (Light from the Future) which will be used as an theme song for popular video game series Tales's new chapter Tales of the Rays: Fairy’s Requiem, it will be the first single since Kimi he no Uta from 2017. It will be their third promotional song to the same video game series. On 13 March, the single will be included in their first two-member studio album NewJourney.

In October 2023, Ikemori himself as representative of Deen, made guest appearance at the Japan's Anime Song Festival held at Melaka, Malaysia. It became his first stage appearance in Malaysia since his debut.

As of 2023, they have released 46 singles, 17 studio albums, 7 best albums, 2 live and 3 cover albums.

== Members ==
- Shuuichi Ikemori (池森秀一) (1993–): vocalist, composer and lyricist
- Kouji Yamane (山根公路) (1993–): keyboardist, chorus, composer

=== Former members ===
- Tatsuma Nakai (仲居辰磨) (1993): guitarist
- Keisuke Kurasawa (倉澤圭介) (1993–1994): drummer
- Naoki Uzumoto (宇津本直紀) (1993–1999): drummer, composer, vocals
- Shinji Tagawa (田川伸治) (1994–2018): guitarist, bassist, vocals, composer

== Discography ==
=== Studio albums ===
- Deen (1994)
- I Wish (1996)
- The Day (1998)
- 'Need love (2000)
- Pray (2002)
- Utopia (2003)
- Road Cruisin' (2004)
- Diamonds (2006)
- Deen Next Stage (2009)
- Lovers Concerto (2009)
- Crawl (2010)
- Graduation (2011)
- Marriage (2012)
- Circle (2013)
- Zenkai Koigokoro!! ~Missing you~ (2015)
- Butterfly (2016)
- Parade (2017)
- NewJourney (2019)
- Twilight in City: For Lovers Only (2021)
- Spur (2021)
- Dance in City: For Groovers Only (2024)
- Rock On! (2025)
