= Tetsurō Oda =

Japanese composer (born 1958)

- Also known as: Eddy Blues, Tetsu
- Born: Tetsurō Hamada (濱田 哲郎); March 11, 1958 (age 68); Tokyo, Japan
- Genres: Pop
- Occupations: Composer; record producer; singer-songwriter
- Instruments: Vocal; guitar; keyboard
- Years active: 1978–present
- Labels: KING Records; Universal Music Japan; CBS Sony; BMG Victor
- Website: www.t-oda.jp

YouTube information
- Channel: 織田哲郎 T's Corporation
- Years active: 2016 -
- Subscribers: 122 thousand
- Views: 19 million
- Last updated: January 15, 2024

Tetsurō Oda (織田 哲郎, Oda Tetsurō; born March 11, 1958) is a Japanese composer, record producer, and singer-songwriter. Oda is the third best-selling composer in the history of the Japanese singles chart, with over 40 million units being sold.

== Biography ==
Between years 1978-1979, he was member of the rock band Why along with Kenji Kitajima, following frontman of the band Fence of Defense and brother of the musical producer Daiko Nagato, Shuusuke Nagato. Between years 1980-1981, he was member of another rock band "Oda Tetsurō&9th IMAGE".

Oda has embarked on his own solo career since the 1981. As a recording artist, he is best known for the chart-topping single "Itsumademo Kawaranu Ai o", which was released in 1992.

Oda gained prominence as a songwriter in Japan during the late 1980s. He composed over 50 top-ten hit singles on the Japanese Oricon chart during the 1990s, including 12 that have sold over 1 million copies. At the commercial peak of his career, Oda produced a string of popular hit songs with artists such as Zard, Tube, Wands, Deen, and Field of View. He also discovered and collaborated with Nanase Aikawa, one of the best-selling Japanese female pop icons from the latter half of the 1990s.

In 1990, Oda won the 32nd Japan Record Award for the song "Odoru Pompokorin", co-written by Momoko Sakura and performed by B.B. Queens. Oda has been the third best-selling composer in the history of the Japanese singles chart, which started in 1968, just behind Kyōhei Tsutsumi and Tetsuya Komuro. Accumulated sales of his compositions released as singles have been estimated at over 40 million units as of 2020.

In 2000, he was attacked in an attempted robbery in Madrid, Spain, where he was visiting for sight seeing. His neck was squeezed from behind so hard that his vocal cords were damaged and his singing voice disappeared. After a year of rehabilitation, Oda resumed a live tour in 2002.

== Discography ==
=== Studio albums ===
Title	Album details	Peak chart positions
Title	Album details	JPN Oricon
Voice	Released: 22 June 1983; Label: CBS Sony; Formats: LP, CD, digital download, streaming	-
New Morning	Released: 21 May 1984; Label: CBS Sony; Formats: LP, CD	-
Night Waves	Released: 28 August 1985; Label: CBS Sony; Formats: LP, CD	-
Life	Released: 21 April 1986; Label: CBS Sony; Formats: LP, CD	-
Ships	Released: 26 August 1987; Label: CBS Sony; Formats: LP, CD	-
Season	Released: 21 May 1988; Label: CBS Sony; Formats: LP, CD	-
Candle in the Rain	Released: 21 March 1989; Label: CBS Sony; Formats: CD	-
Itsuka Subete no Tozasareta Tobira ga Hirakareru Hi Made (いつかすべての閉ざされた扉が開かれる日まで)	Released: 21 April 1990; Label: Platz; Formats: CD	72
Endless Dream	Released: 24 June 1992; Label: BMG Victor; Formats: CD	9
T	Released: 21 May 1993; Label: Rhizome; Formats: CD	35
One Night	Released: 23 May 2007; Label: Universal J; Formats: CD	100
W Face	Released: 30 October 2013; Label: King; Formats: CD	106

=== EPs ===
Title	Album details	Peak chart positions
Title	Album details	JPN Oricon
Wildlife	Released: 26 February 1987; Label: CBS Sony; Formats: LP, CD	-

=== Self-cover albums ===
Title	Album details	Peak chart positions
Title	Album details	JPN Oricon
Songs	Released: 23 December 1993; Label: Rhizome; Formats: CD	7
Melodies	Released: 20 September 2006; Label: Universal J; Formats: CD	56

=== Compilation albums ===
Title	Album details	Peak chart positions
Title	Album details	JPN Oricon
Complete of Tetsuro Oda at the Being Studio	Released: 25 September 2002; Label: B-Gram; Formats: CD	83
Best of Best 1000: Tetsuro Oda	Released: 12 December 2007; Label: B-Gram; Formats: CD	169
Growing Up 1983–1989	Released: 12 December 2008; Label: GT Music; Formats: CD, digital download, streaming	204

=== Singles ===
Year	Album	Chart positions (JP)	Label
1981	"Iro Aseta Machi" (色あせた街)	-	Canyon
1983	"Honoo no Sadame" (炎のさだめ)	-	Star Child
1983	"2001Nen" (2001年)	-	CBS Sony
1983	"Toki wo Koete" (時を超えて)	-	CBS Sony
1984	"Lucie My Love"	-	CBS Sony
1985	"Stay: Okizari ni Sareta Ai no Naka de" (STAY -置き去りにされた愛の中で-)	-	CBS Sony
1987	"Ai wo Sagashite" (愛を探して)	-	CBS Sony
1988	"Season"	-	CBS Sony
1989	"In the dream"	-	CBS Sony
1990	"Hikari to Kage no Naka de" (光と影の中で)	-	Platz
1990	"Smile for me"	-	Platz
1992	"Itsumademo Kawaranu Ai wo" (いつまでも変わらぬ愛を)	1	BMG Victor
1992	"Kimi no Me ni Rainbow" (朝がくるまで)	14	BMG Victor
1993	"Asa ga Kuru made" (朝がくるまで)	29	Rhizome
1994	"Kimi no Egao wo Mamoritai" (君の笑顔を守りたい)	8	Rhizome
1998	"Aozora" (青空)	149	Zootrec
2000	"Kizuna" (キズナ)	32	Zootrec
2003	"Mayonaka no Niji" (真夜中の虹)	-	Zootrec
2003	"Inori" (祈り)	-	Zootrec
2007	"Tsuki no Namida" (月ノ涙)	115	Universal J
2010	"Itsumo Anata ga 2011" (いつもあなたが 2011)	-	Lantis
2017	"Cafe Broken Heart"	148	King

==== Digital single ====
Year	Single	Reference
2011	"Itsumademo Kawaranu Ai wo-2011 version" (いつまでも変わらぬ愛を 2011)	
2011	"Anata no Uta" (あなたのうた)	
2023	"Negai" (願い)	

==== Collaboration singles ====
Year	Album	Chart positions (JP)	Label
1992	"Bomber Girl: with Fusanosuke Kondo	20	BMG Victor
1993	"Jounetsu wa Neranai" (憂鬱は眠らない): with Maki Ohguro	18	Rhizome
2002	"Candle Light": with Anri	97	Cutting edge
2008	"Eternal Landscape": with Skoop On Somebody	47	SME

== Songwriting credits ==
=== 1990s ===
Show more

List of songs written for other artists, showing year released and album name
Year	Title	Artist(s)	Album/Single
1990	"Chance!"	Yui Asaka	Chance!
1990	"7 Days Girl"	Yui Asaka	Nude Songs
1990	"Odoru Pompokolin"	B.B.Queens	Odoru Pompokolin
1990	"Yume ga Ippai"	Yumi Seki	Yume Ippai
1990	"Kiss Shite Loneliness"	Yoko Minamino	Kiss Shite Loneliness
1991	"Good-bye my Loneliness"	Zard	Good-bye my Loneliness
1991	"Fushigi ne..."	Zard	Fushigi ne...
1991	"Mō Sagasanai"	Zard	Mō Sagasanai
1991	"Omoide Kujuukurihama"	Mi-Ke	Omoide Kujuukurihama
1991	"Rock Your Fire"	Hideki Saijo	Rock Your Fire
1991	"Hashire Shougimono"	Hideki Saijo	Hashire Shougimono
1991	"Abunai Hashi wo Watare"	Hideki Saijo	Moichido
1992	"Nemurenai Yoru wo Daite"	Zard	Nemurenai Yoru wo Daite
1992	"Just Illusion"	T-Bolan	Just Illusion
1992	"Kanashiki Teddy Boy"	Mi-Ke	Kanashiki Teddy Bo
1992	"Sekaijū no Dare Yori Kitto"	Miho Nakayama and Wands	Sekaijū no Dare Yori Kitto
1993	"Makenaide"	Zard	Makenaide
1993	"Yureru Omoi"	Zard	Yureru Omoi sg.
1993	"You and me (and…)"	Zard	Yureru Omoi al.
1993	"Kitto Wasurenai"	Zard	Kitto Wasurenai
1993	"Kono Mama Kimi Dake wo Ubaisaritai"	Deen	Kono Mama Kimi Dake wo Ubaisaritai
1993	"Tsubasa wo Hirogete"	Deen	Tsubasa wo Hirogete
1993	"Memories"	Deen	Memories
1993	"Chotto"	Maki Ohguro	Chotto
1993	"Sakihokore Itoshisa yo"	Wink	Sakihokore Itoshisa yo
1993	"Koe ni Naranai hodo ni Itoshii"	Manish	Koe ni Naranai hodo ni Itoshii
1993	"Kimi ga Hoshii Subete ga Hoshii"	Manish	Kimi ga Hoshii Subete ga Hoshii
1993	"Nemurenai Machi ni Nagasarete"	Manish	Nemurenai Machi ni Nagasarete
1994	"Kono Ai ni Oyogi Tsukaretemo"	Zard	Kono Ai ni Oyogi Tsukarete mo/Boy
1994	"Oh My Love"	Zard	Oh My Love
1994	"Anata wo Kanjiteitai"	Zard	Anata wo Kanjiteitai
1994	"Hitomi Sorasanaide"	Deen	Hitomi Sorasanaide
1994	"Omoikiri Waratte", "Hiroi Sekai de Kimi to Deatta"	Deen	Deen (al.)
1994	"Sekai wa Owaru Made wa"	Wands	Sekai wa Owaru Made wa
1995	"Aoi Usagi"	Noriko Sakai	Aoi Usagi
1995	"Kimi ga Ita kara"	Field of View	Kimi ga Ita kara
1995	"Totsuzen"	Field of View	Totsuzen
1995	"Forever you", "I'm in love"	Zard	Forever You
1995	"Zettai ni Dare mo"	Zyyg	Zettai ni Dare mo
1995	"Yume Miru Shoujo ja Irarenai"	Nanase Aikawa	Yume Miru Shoujo ja Irarenai

=== 2000s ===
Show more

List of songs written for other artists, showing year released and album name
Year	Title	Artist(s)	Album/Single
2003	"Days"	Akina Nakamori	Days
2003	"Kaze no Hate He"	Akina Nakamori	I Hope So

=== 2010s ===
Show more

List of songs written for other artists, showing year released and album name
Year	Title	Artist(s)	Album/Single
2012	"Namida Hoshi ni Kagayaku"	KinKi Kids	Kawatta Karachi no Ishi
