= All Time Best =

Compilation album by Miho Nakayama
- Released: December 23, 2020
- Recorded: 1985–2019
- Genres: J-pop; kayōkyoku; dance-pop; teen pop; city pop; pop rock; R&B
- Length: 3:02:01
- Language: Japanese
- Label: King Records

Miho Nakayama chronology
Neuf Neuf (2019)	All Time Best (2020)

All Time Best (オール・タイム・ベスト, Ōru Taimu Besuto) is the 17th compilation album by Japanese entertainer Miho Nakayama. Released through King Records on December 23, 2020 to commemorate Nakayama's 35th anniversary, the three-disc album compiles all 39 of her past singles plus one song from her 2019 album Neuf Neuf. A limited edition release features a bonus Blu-ray disc that includes an HD remaster of Virgin Flight '86: Miho Nakayama First Concert.

The album peaked at No. 29 on Oricon's albums chart and No. 26 on Billboard Japan's Hot Albums chart.

== Track listing ==
Disc 1
No.	Title	Lyrics	Music	Arrangement	Length
1.	"C"	Takashi Matsumoto	Kyōhei Tsutsumi	Mitsuo Hagita	3:29
2.	"Namaiki" ((生意気; "Saucy"))	Matsumoto	Tsutsumi	Motoki Funayama	3:20
3.	"Be-Bop High School"	Matsumoto	Tsutsumi	Hagita	3:51
4.	"Iro White Blend" (Iro Howaito Burendo (色・ホワイトブレンド; "Colored White Blend"))	Mariya Takeuchi	Takeuchi	Nobuyuki Shimizu	4:14
5.	"Close Up" (Kurōzu Appu (クローズ・アップ))	Matsumoto	Kazuo Zaitsu	Masaaki Ōmura	4:00
6.	"Jingi Aishite Moraimasu" ((JINGI・愛してもらいます; "Jingi, I Want You to Love Me"))	Matsumoto	Tetsuya Komuro	Ōmura	3:50
7.	"Tsuiteru ne Notteru ne" ((ツイてるね ノッてるね; "It's Awesome, It's Knocking"))	Matsumoto	Tsutsumi	Ōmura; Funayama	3:43
8.	"Waku Waku Sasete" ((WAKU WAKUさせて; "Excite Me More"))	Matsumoto	Tsutsumi	Funayama	3:58
9.	"Hade!!!" ((「派手!!!」; "Flashy!!!"))	Matsumoto	Tsutsumi	Funayama	4:01
10.	"50/50"	Shun Taguchi	Komuro	Funayama	3:42
11.	"Catch Me"	Toshiki Kadomatsu	Kadomatsu	Kadomatsu	4:12
12.	"You're My Only Shinin' Star"	Kadomatsu	Kadomatsu	Kadomatsu; Kazuo Ōtani (strings); Shin Kazuhara (brass)	4:39
13.	"Mermaid" (Māmeido (人魚姫 mermaid))	Chinfa Kan	Cindy	Rod Antoon	4:06
14.	"Witches" (Uitchizu (Witchesウイッチズ))	Kan	Cindy	Yūji Toriyama	3:52
Total length:					54:54

Disc 2
No.	Title	Lyrics	Music	Arrangement	Length
1.	"Rosécolor"	Kan	Cindy	Toriyama	5:00
2.	"Virgin Eyes"	Yumi Yoshimoto	Anri	Yasuharu Ogura	4:08
3.	"Midnight Taxi"	Ryō Asuka	Asuka	Tomoji Sogawa	4:49
4.	"Semi-sweet Magic" (Semisuuīto no Mahō (セミスウィートの魔法))	Gorō Matsui	Cindy	Antoon; Cindy (chorus)	4:57
5.	"Megamitachi no Bōken" ((女神たちの冒険; "The Adventures of the Goddesses"))	Matsui	Hideo Saitō	Saitō	4:06
6.	"Aishiterutte Iwanai!" ((愛してるっていわない!; "I Don't Love You!"))	Yoshihiko Andō	Hitoshi Haba	Nobuhiko Kashiwara	3:45
7.	"Kore kara no I Love You" ((これからのI Love You; "This Is I Love You"))	Matsui	Kenjirō Sakiya	ATOM; Sakiya (strings)	5:57
8.	"Rosa"	Issaque	Yoshimasa Inoue	ATOM	5:13
9.	"Tōi Machi no Doko ka de..." ((遠い街のどこかで…; "Somewhere in a Distant City..."))	Mika Watanabe	Hideya Nakazaki	Nakazaki	5:57
10.	"Mellow"	Issaque	Inoue	Inoue	5:52
11.	"Sekaijū no Dare Yori Kitto (Miho Nakayama & Wands)" ((世界中の誰よりきっと; "Surely More Than Anyone in the World"))	Show Wesugi; Nakayama	Tetsurō Oda	Takeshi Hayama	4:07
12.	"Shiawase ni Naru Tame ni" ((幸せになるために; "To Be Happy"))	Yūho Iwasato; Nakayama	Toshifumi Hinata	Hinata	4:16
13.	"Anata ni Nara..." ((あなたになら…; "For You..."))	Nakayama	Joe Hisaishi	Hisaishi	5:26
Total length:					63:39

Disc 3
No.	Title	Lyrics	Music	Arrangement	Length
1.	"Tada Nakitaku Naru no" ((ただ泣きたくなるの; "I Just Feel Like Crying"))	Yurie Kokubu; Nakayama	Masaki Iwamoto	Iwamoto	5:02
2.	"Sea Paradise (OL no Hanran)" ((Sea Paradise -OLの反乱-; "Sea Paradise -An Office Lady's Rebellion-"))	Nakayama	KNACK	ATOM	6:17
3.	"Hero"	Mariah Carey; Nakayama	Carey; Walter Afanasieff	Robbie Buchanan	4:53
4.	"Cheers for You"	Masato Odake; Nakayama	Toshinobu Kubota	Camus Celli; Andres Levin	4:46
5.	"Hurt to Heart (Itami no Yukue)" ((Hurt to Heart〜痛みの行方〜; "Hurt to Heart ~Whereabouts of Pain"))	Keiko Yokoyama	Yokoyama	Jerry Hey	5:13
6.	"Thinking About You (Anata no Yoru wo Tsutsumitai)" ((Thinking About You〜あなたの夜を包みたい〜; "Thinking About You ~I Want to Wrap Your Night~"))	Odake	Maria	Kazuo Ōtani	4:52
7.	"True Romance"	Odake	Inoue	Hajime Mizoguchi	4:16
8.	"Mirai e no Present (Miho Nakayama with Mayo)" (Mirai e no Purezento (未来へのプレゼント; "A Present for the Future"))	Mayo Okamoto; Nakayama	Okamoto	Tomoji Sogawa	4:26
9.	"March Color" (Māchi Karā (マーチカラー))	Nakayama; Odake	Yūko Ōtaki	Shinya Naitō	3:54
10.	"Love Clover"	Takuro; Nakayama	Takuro	Takuro	5:22
11.	"A Place Under the Sun"	Nakayama	Inoue	Inoue	5:05
12.	"Adore"	Odake	Shinyo Kanazawa	Yōichi Shimada	5:07
13.	"Kimi no Koto" ((君のこと; "Of You"))	Takahiro Shibata; Watanabe	Shibata	Ren Takada	4:28
Total length:					63:37

Limited Edition Bonus Blu-ray
No.	Title	Length
1.	"Virgin Flight '86: Miho Nakayama First Concert" (HD Remastering Version)
2.	"Kimi no Koto" (Music Video)

== Charts ==
Chart (2020)	Peak position
Oricon Japanese Albums	29
Billboard Japan Hot Albums	26
Billboard Japan Top Albums Sales	21
