= Perfect Best 2 =

Miho Nakayama Perfect Best 2

Compilation album by Miho Nakayama
- Released: October 2, 2013
- Recorded: 1985–1999
- Genre: J-pop; kayōkyoku; dance-pop; teen pop; city pop; pop rock
- Length: 78:37
- Language: Japanese
- Label: King Records

Miho Nakayama chronology
Miho Nakayama Perfect Best (2010)	Miho Nakayama Perfect Best 2 (2013)	30th Anniversary: The Perfect Singles Box (2015)

Miho Nakayama Perfect Best 2 (中山美穂 パーフェクト・ベスト2, Nakayama Miho Pāfekuto Besuto Tsū) is the 16th compilation album by Japanese entertainer Miho Nakayama. Released through King Records on November 2, 2013, the album is a supplement to the 2010 compilation Miho Nakayama Perfect Best, covering the singles not featured in the previous release and including different versions of Nakayama's popular singles.

The album peaked at No. 133 on Oricon's albums chart.

== Track listing ==
No.	Title	Lyrics	Music	Arrangement	Length
1.	"Close Up [Album Ver.]" (Kurōzu Appu (クローズ・アップ))	Takashi Matsumoto	Kazuo Zaitsu	Masaaki Ōmura	4:26
2.	"You're My Only Shinin' Star ['86 Album Ver.]"	Toshiki Kadomatsu	Kadomatsu	Kadomatsu; Kazuo Ōtani (strings); Shin Kazuhara (brass)	4:40
3.	"Be-Bop High School [Live Ver.]"	Matsumoto	Kyōhei Tsutsumi	Mitsuo Hagita	4:18
4.	"Waku Waku Sasete [Party Version]" ((WAKU WAKUさせて; "Excite Me More"))	Matsumoto	Tsutsumi	Motoki Funayama	6:16
5.	"C [Album Ver.]"	Matsumoto	Tsutsumi	Hagita	3:29
6.	"Tsuiteru ne Notteru ne [Album Ver.]" ((ツイてるね ノッてるね; "It's Crazy, It's Knocking"))	Matsumoto	Tsutsumi	Ōmura; Funayama	3:43
7.	"Catch Me [Album Ver.]"	Kadomatsu	Kadomatsu	Kadomatsu	4:40
8.	"Witches [Album Ver.]"	Chinfa Kan	Cindy	Yūji Toriyama	4:47
9.	"Virgin Eyes [Edit Ver.]"	Yumi Yoshimoto	Anri	Yasuharu Ogura	4:31
10.	"Megamitachi no Bōken [Album Ver.]" ((女神たちの冒険; "The Adventures of the Goddesses"))	Gorō Matsui	Hideo Saitō	Saitō	4:10
11.	"Tada Nakitaku Naru no [Another Edition]" ((ただ泣きたくなるの; "I Just Feel Like Crying"))	Yurie Kokubu; Miho Nakayama	Masaki Iwamoto	ATOM+1	5:09
12.	"Sekaijū no Dare Yori Kitto [Live Ver.]" ((世界中の誰よりきっと; "Surely More Than Anyone in the World"))	Show Wesugi; Nakayama	Tetsurō Oda	Takeshi Hayama	4:45
13.	"True Romance"	Masato Odake	Yoshimasa Inoue	Hajime Mizoguchi	4:16
14.	"March Color" (Māchi Karā (マーチカラー))	Nakayama; Odake	Yūko Ōtaki	Shinya Naitō	3:54
15.	"Love Clover"	Takuro; Nakayama	Takuro	Takuro	5:22
16.	"A Place Under the Sun"	Nakayama	Inoue	Inoue	5:05
17.	"Adore"	Odake	Shinyo Kanazawa	Yōichi Shimada	5:07
Total length:					78:37

== Charts ==
Chart (2013)	Peak position
Japanese Albums (Oricon)	133
