= Collection II (Miho Nakayama album) =

Compilation album by Miho Nakayama
- Released: November 21, 1990
- Recorded: 1988–1990
- Genres: J-pop; kayōkyoku; dance-pop; city pop
- Length: 43:12
- Language: Japanese
- Label: King Records

Miho Nakayama chronology
Jeweluna (1990)	Collection II (1990)	Dé eaya (1991)

Singles from Collection II
- 1. "Mermaid" Released: July 11, 1988; 2. "Rosécolor" Released: February 21, 1989; 3. "Aishiterutte Iwanai!" Released: October 22, 1990

Collection II (コレクション・ツー, Korekushon Tsū) is the third compilation album by Japanese entertainer Miho Nakayama. Released through King Records on November 21, 1990, the album compiles Nakayama's singles from 1988 to 1990, plus the new song "I Can't Follow You".

The album peaked at No. 2 on Oricon's albums chart. It sold over 392,000 copies and was certified Platinum by the RIAJ.

== Track listing ==
No.	Title	Lyrics	Music	Arrangement	Length
1.	"You're My Only Shinin' Star"	Toshiki Kadomatsu	Kadomatsu	Kadomatsu; Kazuo Ōtani (strings); Shin Kazuhara (brass)	4:40
2.	"Mermaid" (Māmeido (人魚姫 mermaid))	Chinfa Kan	Cindy	Rod Antoon	4:07
3.	"Witches" (Uitchizu (Witchesウイッチズ))	Kan	Cindy	Yūji Toriyama	3:52
4.	"Rosécolor"	Kan	Cindy	Toriyama	5:00
5.	"Virgin Eyes"	Yumi Yoshimoto	Anri	Yasuharu Ogura	4:09
6.	"Midnight Taxi"	Ryō Asuka	Asuka	Tomoji Sogawa	4:50
7.	"Semi-sweet Magic" (Semisuuīto no Mahō (セミスウィートの魔法))	Gorō Matsui	Cindy	Antoon; Cindy (chorus)	5:23
8.	"Megamitachi no Bōken" ((女神たちの冒険; "The Adventures of the Goddesses"))	Matsui	Hideo Saitō	Saitō	4:06
9.	"Aishiterutte Iwanai!" ((愛してるっていわない!; "I Don't Love You!"))	Yoshihiko Andō	Hitoshi Haba	Nobuhiko Kashiwara	3:47
10.	"I Can't Follow You"	Wakako Kaku	Kyōhei Tsutsumi	Motoki Funayama	3:46
Total length:					43:12

== Charts ==
Weekly charts

Chart (1990)	Peak position
Japanese Albums (Oricon)	2

Year-end charts

Chart (1991)	Peak position
Japanese Albums (Oricon)	43

== Certification ==
Region	Certification	Certified units/sales
Japan (RIAJ)	Platinum	400,000^{^}
^{^} Shipments figures based on certification alone.

== See also ==
- 1990 in Japanese music
