= Miho Nakayama 38th Anniversary Concert: Trois =

Live video album

Video by Miho Nakayama
- Released: November 22, 2023
- Recorded: June 24, 2023
- Venue: Kawaguchiko Stellar Theater, Fujikawaguchiko, Yamanashi
- Genre: J-pop; kayōkyoku; dance-pop; city pop; R&B
- Length: 135 minutes
- Language: Japanese
- Label: King Records

Miho Nakayama chronology
Miho Nakayama Complete DVD Box (2003)	Miho Nakayama 38th Anniversary Concert: Trois (2023)	Miho Nakayama Concert Tour 2024: Deux (2024)

Alternate cover
- Limited Edition cover

Miho Nakayama 38th Anniversary Concert: Trois is a live video album by Japanese entertainer Miho Nakayama. Released exclusively on Blu-ray through King Records on November 22, 2023, the video was recorded at the Kawaguchiko Stellar Theater on June 24, 2023, as part of her 38th anniversary tour. A limited edition release includes a photo book of the concert. The tour's title uses "trois", the French word for "three", as a countdown to Nakayama's 40th anniversary.

== Track listing ==
No.	Title	Lyrics	Music	Length
1.	"Title"	Kōki Okada; Taka Satō; Yūsuke Gotō; (To Be Continued)	To Be Continued
2.	"Hade!!!" ((「派手!!!」; "Flashy!!!"))	Takashi Matsumoto	Kyōhei Tsutsumi
3.	"50/50"	Shun Taguchi	Tetsuya Komuro
4.	"Megamitachi no Bōken" ((女神たちの冒険; "The Adventures of the Goddesses"))	Gorō Matsui	Hideo Saitō
5.	"Iro White Blend" (Iro Howaito Burendo (色・ホワイトブレンド; "Colored White Blend"))	Mariya Takeuchi	Takeuchi
6.	"Mermaid" (Māmeido (人魚姫 mermaid))	Chinfa Kan	Cindy
7.	"Virgin Eyes"	Yumi Yoshimoto	Anri
8.	"Kimi no Koto" ((君のこと; "Of You"))	Takahiro Shibata; Mika Watanabe	Shibata
10.	"You're My Only Shinin' Star"	Toshiki Kadomatsu	Kadomatsu
11.	"Angel"	Miho Nakayama; Masato Odake	Odake
12.	"Spiritual Kisses"	Nakayama	Watanabe
13.	"Catch Me"	Kadomatsu	Kadomatsu
14.	"Hoshi no Nusutto" ((星の盗人; "The Thief from the Stars"))	Nakayama; Iza Mizuno	KNACK
15.	"Sekaijū no Dare Yori Kitto" ((世界中の誰よりきっと; "Surely More Than Anyone in the World"))	Show Wesugi; Nakayama	Tetsurō Oda
16.	"Tada Nakitaku Naru no" ((ただ泣きたくなるの; "I Just Feel Like Crying"))	Yurie Kokubu; Nakayama	Masaki Iwamoto
17.	"The Eternites"	Nakayama	Keisuke Araki
18.	"Waku Waku Sasete" ((WAKU WAKUさせて; "Excite Me More"))	Matsumoto	Tsutsumi
19.	"Tsuiteru ne Notteru ne" ((ツイてるね ノッてるね; "It's Awesome, It's Knocking"))	Matsumoto	Tsutsumi
20.	"Medley: By-By My Sea Breeze/Futtari no Photograph/Aishiterutte Iwanai!" (メドレー By‐By My Sea Breeze / ふったりのPhotograph / 愛してるっていわない！ ("Medley: By-By My Sea Breeze/Two Photographs/I Don't Love You!"))	Taguchi (1); Nakayama (2); Yoshihiko Andō (3)	Toshinobu Kubota (1); KNACK (2); Hitoshi Haba (3)
21.	"Treasure"	Yui Nishiwaki	Nishiwaki; Yōko Orihara

Bonus footage
No.	Title	Length
1.	"Making-of Video" ((メイキング密着映像))
