= Miho Nakayama Concert Tour 2024: Deux =

Live video album

Video by Miho Nakayama
- Released: November 27, 2024
- Recorded: June 21, 2024
- Venue: Tachikawa Stage Garden, Tachikawa, Tokyo
- Genre: J-pop; kayōkyoku; dance-pop; city pop; pop rock; R&B
- Language: Japanese
- Label: King Records

Miho Nakayama chronology
Miho Nakayama 38th Anniversary Concert: Trois (2023)	Miho Nakayama Concert Tour 2024: Deux (2024)	Miho Nakayama 40th Anniversary: The Best Ten (2025)

Alternate cover
- Limited Edition cover

Miho Nakayama Concert Tour 2024: Deux is a live video album by Japanese entertainer Miho Nakayama. Released exclusively on Blu-ray through King Records on November 27, 2024, the video was recorded at the Tachikawa Stage Garden on June 21, 2024, as part of her 39th anniversary tour. A limited edition release includes a photo book of the concert. The tour's title uses "deux", the French word for "two", as a countdown to what would have been Nakayama's 40th anniversary. It was Nakayama's final video release before she died on December 6.

The video peaked at No. 20 on Oricon's Blu-ray chart.

== Track listing ==
No.	Title	Lyrics	Music	Length
1.	"Ninna Nanna"	Miho Nakayama	Night Tempo
2.	"Catch Me"	Toshiki Kadomatsu	Kadomatsu
3.	"Virgin Eyes"	Yumi Yoshimoto	Anri
4.	"Mellow"	Issaque	Yoshimasa Inoue
5.	"Tsuki no Ring" (Tsuki no Ringu (月のリング; "Moon Ring"))	Nakayama	M. Rie
6.	"Yaban na Hōseki" ((野蛮な宝石; "Barbaric Jewel"))	Gorō Matsui	Hideo Saitō
7.	"Tsuiteru ne Notteru ne" ((ツイてるね ノッてるね; "It's Awesome, It's Knocking"))	Takashi Matsumoto	Kyōhei Tsutsumi
8.	"Mirai e no Present" (Mirai e no Purezento (未来へのプレゼント; "A Present for the Future"))	Mayo Okamoto; Nakayama	Okamoto
9.	"Sanctuary" (Sankuchuari (サンクチュアリ〜Sanctuary〜))	Yoshimoto	Anri
10.	"Party Down" (Band Session)
11.	"Hide 'n' Seek"	Nakayama	Cindy; Yūji Toriyama
12.	"Cat Walk"	Rui Serizawa	Kitarō
13.	"Destiny"	Cindy	Cindy
14.	"Waku Waku Sasete" ((WAKU WAKUさせて; "Excite Me More"))	Matsumoto	Tsutsumi
15.	"Hade!!!" ((「派手!!!」; "Flashy!!!"))	Matsumoto	Tsutsumi
16.	"Tada Nakitaku Naru no" ((ただ泣きたくなるの; "I Just Feel Like Crying"))	Yurie Kokubu; Nakayama	Masaki Iwamoto
17.	"Sekaijū no Dare Yori Kitto" ((世界中の誰よりきっと; "Surely More Than Anyone in the World"))	Show Wesugi; Nakayama	Tetsurō Oda
18.	"Jingi Aishite Moraimasu" ((JINGI・愛してもらいます; "Jingi, I Want You to Love Me"))	Matsumoto	Tetsuya Komuro
19.	"Namaiki" ((生意気; "Saucy"))	Matsumoto	Tsutsumi
20.	"Treasure"	Yui Nishiwaki	Nishiwaki; Yōko Orihara

Bonus footage
No.	Title	Length
1.	"Behind the Scenes"
2.	"Celebrating 39 Years"

== Charts ==
Chart (2024)	Peak position
Japanese Blu-ray (Oricon)	20
