= Virgin Flight '86: Miho Nakayama First Concert =

Live video album

Video by Miho Nakayama
- Released: July 21, 1986
- Recorded: April 5, 1986
- Venue: Nakano Sunplaza
- Genre: J-pop; kayōkyoku; dance-pop; teen pop
- Length: 59 minutes
- Language: Japanese
- Label: King Records
- Producer: Norio Yamanaka; Junichi Ebihara; Toshiya Ohe

Miho Nakayama chronology
Na-ma-i-ki (1985)	Virgin Flight '86: Miho Nakayama First Concert (1986)	Catch Me: Miho Nakayama Live '88 (1988)

Virgin Flight '86: Miho Nakayama First Concert (VIRGIN FLIGHT '86 中山美穂ファースト・コンサート) is the first live video album by Japanese entertainer Miho Nakayama. Released through King Records on July 21, 1986, the video was recorded at Nakayama's debut concert at the Nakano Sunplaza on April 5, 1986.

The video was compiled in the 2003 box set Miho Nakayama Complete DVD Box. It was also remastered in HD and released as a bonus Blu-ray disc on the limited edition release of Nakayama's 2020 compilation album All Time Best.

== Track listing ==
No.	Title	Lyrics	Music	Length
1.	"C"	Takashi Matsumoto	Kyōhei Tsutsumi
2.	"Aitsu" ((あいつ; "That Person"))	Yuho Iwasato	Takayuki Baba
3.	"Heart Break"	Yoshiko Miura	Baba
4.	"Namaiki" ((生意気; "Saucy"))	Matsumoto	Tsutsumi
5.	"Hōkago" (放課後 ("After School"))	Matsumoto	Tsutsumi
6.	"A-so-bi" ((あ・そ・び; "P-l-a-y"))	Yuho Iwasato	Ichinen Miura
7.	"Last Scene ni Ai wo Komete" (Rasuto Shīn ni Ai wo Komete (ラストシーンに愛をこめて; "With Love in the Last Scene"))	Fumiko Okada	Kisaburō Suzuki
8.	"Mona Lisa" (Mona Liza (モナリザ))	Ichiko Takehana	Tsugutoshi Gotō
9.	"U"	Y. Iwasato	Miho Iwasato
10.	"Tokimeki no Season" (Tokimeki no Shīzun (ときめきの季節（シーズン）; "Crush Season"))	Mariya Takeuchi	Takeuchi
11.	"Iro White Blend" (Iro Howaito Burendo (色・ホワイトブレンド; "Colored White Blend"))	Takeuchi	Takeuchi
12.	"Be-Bop High School"	Matsumoto	Tsutsumi
13.	"C" (Encore)	Matsumoto	Tsutsumi
14.	"Be-Bop High School" (Encore)	Matsumoto	Tsutsumi

== Album version ==
Virgin Flight '86: Miho Nakayama First Concert

Live album by Miho Nakayama
- Released: August 1, 1986
- Recorded: April 5, 1986
- Venue: Nakano Sunplaza
- Genre: J-pop; kayōkyoku; teen pop
- Length: 43:52
- Language: Japanese
- Label: King Records
- Producer: Norio Yamanaka

Miho Nakayama chronology
Summer Breeze (1985)	Virgin Flight '86: Miho Nakayama First Concert (1986)	Exotique (1986)

The audio version of the concert was released on August 1, 1986. It peaked at No. 19 on Oricon's albums chart and sold over 48,000 copies.

=== Track listing ===
Side A
No.	Title	Lyrics	Music	Length
1.	"C"	Matsumoto	Tsutsumi	3:42
2.	"Heart Break"	Y. Miura	Baba	3:59
3.	"Namaiki"	Matsumoto	Tsutsumi	3:22
4.	"Hōkago"	Matsumoto	Tsutsumi	3:19
5.	"A-so-bi"	Y. Iwasato	I. Miura	3:19
Total length:				17:40

Side B
No.	Title	Lyrics	Music	Length
1.	"Last Scene ni Ai wo Komete"	Okada	Suzuki	5:42
2.	"Mona Lisa"	Takehana	Gotō	4:42
3.	"Tokimeki no Season"	Takeuchi	Takeuchi	3:41
4.	"Iro White Blend"	Takeuchi	Takeuchi	3:38
5.	"C" (Encore)	Matsumoto	Tsutsumi	3:20
6.	"Be-Bop High School"	Matsumoto	Tsutsumi	5:08
Total length:				26:12

== Personnel ==
- Miho Nakayama – vocals
- Birthday – backing musicians
- Simon – backing vocals
- Dos Dancers – backing vocals

== Charts ==
Chart (1986)	Peak position
Japanese Albums (Oricon)	19

== See also ==
- 1986 in Japanese music
