= Hide 'n' Seek (album) =

Studio album by Miho Nakayama
- Released: September 5, 1989
- Recorded: 1988–1989
- Genre: J-pop; R&B; dance-pop
- Length: 44:54
- Language: Japanese
- Label: King Records
- Producer: Akira Fukuzumi

Miho Nakayama chronology
Ballads (1989)	Hide 'n' Seek (1989)	Merry Merry (1989)

Singles from Hide 'n' Seek
- 1. "Virgin Eyes" Released: July 12, 1989

Hide 'n' Seek (ハイドゥン・シーク, Haidun Shīku) is the ninth studio album by Japanese entertainer Miho Nakayama. Released through King Records on September 5, 1989, the album features the single "Virgin Eyes", as well as a re-recording of her 1988 No. 1 hit "You're My Only Shinin' Star". It was also Nakayama's last album to be issued on LP.

The album was Nakayama's third to hit No. 1 on Oricon's albums chart. It also sold over 190,000 copies and was certified Gold by the RIAJ.

== Track listing ==
Side A
No.	Title	Lyrics	Music	Arrangement	Length
1.	"Party Down"	Cindy	Yūji Toriyama	The Band	1:46
2.	"Hide 'n' Seek"	Miho Nakayama	Cindy; Toriyama	Toriyama	5:05
3.	"Destiny"	Cindy	Cindy	Toriyama	5:18
4.	"Naked Cruising"	Rui Serizawa	Cindy	Toriyama	5:55
5.	"Endless My First Love"	Nakayama	Nakayama	Shingo Kobayashi	4:16
Total length:					22:19

Side B
No.	Title	Lyrics	Music	Arrangement	Length
1.	"Virgin Eyes [Edit Version]"	Yumi Yoshimoto	Anri	Yasuharu Ogura	4:30
2.	"Stardust Lovers"	Yoshimoto	Anri	Kobayashi	3:59
3.	"Island Blue"	Nakayama	Keizō Nakanishi	Kobayashi	4:35
4.	"Split Love"	Nakayama	Nakayama	Kobayashi	3:51
5.	"You're My Only Shinin' Star (Present from Miho)"	Toshiki Kadomatsu	Kadomatsu	Kazuo Ōtani	5:39
Total length:					22:35

== Charts ==
Chart (1989)	Peak position
Japanese Albums (Oricon)	1

== Certification ==
Region	Certification	Certified units/sales
Japan (RIAJ)	Gold	200,000^{^}
^{^} Shipments figures based on certification alone.

== See also ==
- 1989 in Japanese music
