= Ballads (Miho Nakayama album) =

Compilation album by Miho Nakayama
- Released: March 20, 1989; December 18, 1996 (reissue)
- Recorded: 1987–1988
- Genres: J-pop; kayōkyoku; city pop
- Length: 61:12
- Language: Japanese
- Label: King Records
- Producer: Akira Fukuzumi

Miho Nakayama chronology
Angel Hearts (1988)	Ballads (1989)	Hide 'n' Seek (1989)

Singles from Ballads
- 1. "You're My Only Shinin' Star" Released: February 17, 1988

Alternate cover
- 1996 reissue cover

Ballads (バラード, Barādo) is the second compilation album by Japanese entertainer Miho Nakayama. Released through King Records on March 20, 1989, the album features 12 ballads selected by Nakayama from her past releases, plus new recordings of "Sentimental Tsūshin", "Kabin", and "Try or Cry". The album was reissued on December 18, 1996, as Ballads I with a different cover to match that of Ballads II.

The album peaked at No. 2 on Oricon's albums chart and sold over 195,000 copies. It was also certified Gold by the RIAJ.

== Track listing ==
Side A
No.	Title	Lyrics	Music	Arrangement	Length
1.	"Nanamena Ai wo Yurushite" ((斜めな愛を許して; "Forgive the Diagonal Love"))	Mami Ayukawa	Ayukawa	Shirō Sagisu	5:08
2.	"Silent Night"	Rui Serizawa	Hideya Nakazaki	Nobuyuki Shimizu	4:15
3.	"Sentimental Tsūshin [New Version]" (Senchimentaru Tsūshin (センチメンタル通信; "Sentimental Communication"))	Mebae Miyahara	Mitsuo Hagita	Sagisu	3:59
4.	"You're My Only Shinin' Star"	Toshiki Kadomatsu	Kadomatsu	Kadomatsu; Kazuo Ōtani (strings); Shin Kazuhara (brass)	4:42
5.	"Sherry"	Kadomatsu	Kadomatsu	Kadomatsu	4:39
6.	"Kabin [New Version]" ((花瓶; "Vase"))	Kadomatsu	Kadomatsu	Kadomatsu	6:13
Total length:					29:00

Side B
No.	Title	Lyrics	Music	Arrangement	Length
1.	"Long Distance to the Heaven"	Miho Kitayama	Kitayama	Takao Sugiyama	5:18
2.	"Snow White no Machi" (Sunō Howaito no Machi (スノー・ホワイトの街; "Snow White Town"))	Yui Masaki	Hiroshi Satō	Satō	4:15
3.	"In the Morning"	Masumi Kawamura	Toshinobu Kubota	Sugiyama	5:22
4.	"I Know"	Serizawa	Cindy	Sugiyama	5:29
5.	"Chikai wo Yabutte" ((誓いを破って; "Break the Vow"))	Chinfa Kan	Cindy	Kunio Muramatsu	5:26
6.	"Try or Cry [New Version]"	Kan	Cindy	Kojima	6:26
Total length:					32:20

== Charts ==
Chart (1989)	Peak position
Japanese Albums (Oricon)	2

== Certification ==
Region	Certification	Certified units/sales
Japan (RIAJ)	Gold	200,000^{^}
^{^} Shipments figures based on certification alone.

== See also ==
- 1989 in Japanese music
