= All for You (Miho Nakayama album) =

Studio album by Miho Nakayama
- Released: March 16, 1990
- Recorded: 1989
- Genres: J-pop; pop rock
- Length: 42:16
- Language: Japanese
- Label: King Records
- Producers: Akira Fukuzumi; Cindy

Miho Nakayama chronology
Merry Merry (1989)	All for You (1990)	Jeweluna (1990)

Singles from All for You
- 1. "Midnight Taxi" Released: January 15, 1990; 2. "Semi-sweet Magic" Released: March 21, 1990

All for You (オール・フォー・ユー, Ōru fō Yū) is the 11th studio album by Japanese entertainer Miho Nakayama. Released through King Records on March 16, 1990, the album features the singles "Midnight Taxi" and "Semi-sweet Magic".

The album peaked at No. 3 on Oricon's albums chart. It also sold over 124,000 copies and was certified Gold by the RIAJ.

== Track listing ==
All music is arranged by Tomoji Sogawa, except where indicated.

No.	Title	Lyrics	Music	Arrangement	Length
1.	"Introduction to 'All for You'" (Instrumental)		Sogawa		0:50
2.	"Save Your Love"	Miho Nakayama	Cindy	Yūji Toriyama	4:55
3.	"Lonely Girl"	Masami Tozawa	Hiroshi Narumi; Cindy	Toriyama; Narumi (chorus)	4:16
4.	"Semi-sweet Magic [Album Version]"	Gorō Matsui	Cindy	Rod Antoon; Cindy (chorus)	5:23
5.	"My Love Is All for You"	Nakayama	Nakayama		5:47
6.	"Midnight Taxi [Album Version]"	Ryō Asuka	Asuka		5:02
7.	"Sail in Your Arms"	Yūho Iwasato	Chika Ueda		4:58
8.	"Heaven Knows"	Iwasato	Ueda		4:51
9.	"Koiiro"	Nakayama	Nakayama		6:14
Total length:					42:16

== Charts ==
Chart (1990)	Peak position
Japanese Albums (Oricon)	3

== Certification ==
Region	Certification	Certified units/sales
Japan (RIAJ)	Gold	200,000^{^}
^{^} Shipments figures based on certification alone.

== See also ==
- 1990 in Japanese music
