= Neuf Neuf =

Studio album by Miho Nakayama
- Released: December 4, 2019
- Recorded: 2019
- Studio: King Sekiguchidai Studio
- Genre: J-pop; pop rock
- Length: 35:20
- Language: Japanese
- Label: King Records
- Producer: Ren Takada

Miho Nakayama chronology
30th Anniversary: The Perfect Singles Box (2015)	Neuf Neuf (2019)	All Time Best (2020)

Alternate cover
- First press edition cover

Music video
- Neuf Neuf trailer on YouTube

Neuf Neuf (ヌフヌフ, Nufu Nufu) is the 22nd and final studio album by Japanese entertainer Miho Nakayama. Released through King Records on December 4, 2019, it was Nakayama's first studio album in 20 years since 1999's Manifesto and her final one prior to her death five years after the album's release. The final album features four new songs and four self-covers. The first press limited edition release featured a cover painting by Ryōji Arai and a 2020 mini-calendar.

The album peaked at No. 28 on Oricon's albums chart and No. 37 on Billboard Japan's Hot Albums chart.

== Track listing ==
All music is arranged by Ren Takada.

No.	Title	Lyrics	Music	Length
1.	"Tokeigusa" ((時計草; "Passionflower"))	Miho Nakayama	Ren Takada	4:45
2.	"Tada Nakitaku Naru no" ((ただ泣きたくなるの; "I Feel Like Crying"))	Yurie Kokubu; Nakayama	Masaki Iwamoto	4:51
3.	"Kimi no Koto" ((君のこと; "Of You"))	Takahiro Shibata; Mika Watanabe	Shibata	4:29
4.	"Curtain Call" (Kāten Kōru (カーテンコール))	Takada	Takada	4:19
5.	"You're My Only Shinin' Star"	Toshiki Kadomatsu	Kadomatsu	6:06
6.	"C"	Takashi Matsumoto	Kyōhei Tsutsumi	5:22
7.	"Iro White Blend" (Iro Howaito Burendo (色・ホワイトブレンド; "Colored White Blend"))	Mariya Takeuchi	Takeuchi	4:33
8.	"Neuf" (Instrumental)		Nakayama	0:55
Total length:				35:20

== Personnel ==
- Miho Nakayama – vocals, piano (8)
- Ren Takada – guitar (1–7), programming (1–2, 4–5, 8), backing vocals (1–7), pedal steel guitar (3, 8), ukulele (7), banjo (7)
- Tetsuya Hataya – piano (1–7)
- Wataru Iga – bass (1–7)
- Daichi Ito – drums (1–7)
- Haruna – backing vocals (1–2, 5, 7)

== Charts ==
Chart (2019)	Peak position
Oricon Japanese Albums	28
Billboard Japan Hot Albums	37
Billboard Japan Top Albums Sales	26
