= Midnight Taxi =

Midnight Taxi may refer to:

- Taxi at Midnight, a 1929 German silent thriller film
- Midnight Taxi (1937 film), an American crime film
- The Midnight Taxi, a 1928 American early part-talkie thriller film
- "Midnight Taxi" (song), a 1990 song by Miho Nakayama
