= Night Tempo =

South Korean music producer (born 1986)

- Born: Jung Kyung-ho; February 14, 1986 (age 40); Seoul, South Korea
- Genres: Future funk; vaporwave
- Occupations: Record producer; curator
- Years active: 2015–present
- Labels: Neoncity; Sailor Team; Moonlights Company
- Website: nighttempo.com

YouTube information
- Channel: Night Tempo
- Years active: 2019–present
- Genre: Music
- Subscribers: 131,000
- Views: 56.2 million
- Last updated: August 3, 2026

Korean name
- Hangul: 정경호
- RR: Jeong Gyeongho
- MR: Chŏng Kyŏngho

Jung Kyung-ho (Note: Korean: 정경호) (born February 14, 1986), better known as Night Tempo (Note: Japanese: ナイト・テンポ; Korean: 나이트템포), is a South Korean future funk producer known for his Showa Groove series of remixes of 1980's Japanese city pop. Jung started producing music in 2015, but achieved fame in 2016 with his remix of Mariya Takeuchi's single "Plastic Love," which was uploaded on the YouTube music channel Artzie Music on March 11, 2016, and received over 7 million views on YouTube.

== Early life and career ==
Jung was born on February 14, 1986, in Seoul. As he grew up, he started listening to artists such as Daft Punk, Toshiki Kadomatsu, and Miho Nakayama. His father purchased items from overseas, giving Jung Nakayama's single "Catch Me" as a souvenir. He became a computer programmer and worked night shifts, collecting items such as cassette tapes as the Vaporwave genre rose in the early 2010s.

== Music career ==
Jung started DJing and producing as a hobby during his time as a programmer in 2009, and in 2014 he posted his works on SoundCloud. He came up with the name "Night Tempo" as he produced at mostly at night. On March 11, 2016, the YouTube music channel Artzie Music featured Jung's remix of "Plastic Love" by Mariya Takeuchi. With the remix, he started gaining popularity among future funk fans in South Korea, Japan, Taiwan, and the United States. The remix also boosted the popularity of the original. He started the label Neoncity Records with a friend from Hong Kong as future funk started to become more popular. He gained attention for its revival of 1980s Japanese genre known as city pop, helping give birth to the future funk subgenre of the vaporwave.

Under the title of the "Showa Idol Groove" series, he has released official re-edits of songs by artists from the 1980s, such as Wink and Anri. He remixed singles from the duo BaBe on February 14, 2020, releasing it on his birthday while also gaining a release from the original label. He also created a music video for the remixes as well as holding a release party. On April 29, 2020, he released the fifth Showa Groove remixes for Yuki Saito. On August 7, 2020, he released a Showa Groove remix of Shizuka Kudo's songs, including "Arashi no Sugao."

In 2018, he released his first original album, Moonrise. Their first major original album, Ladies In The City, was released on December 1, 2021. On January 26, 2021, he released the Showa Groove remixes of Miki Matsubara's song "Mayonaka no Door" due to its rise in popularity with TikTok. He appeared at the live show Show What na Night (Shōwana Naito), broadcast on TikTok for the release. In March 2021, he and Charles Chanton teamed up again for a second line of merch that would release in April. On May 19, 2021, he released a compilation titled Night Tempo presents The Showa Idol Groove which signaled his return to the Showa Groove series. The compilation features remixes of Eri Nitta, Hikaru Nishida, Yumi Morio, and Yuyu, which Jung described as "good songs that should be paid more attention." In commemoration of the release, he released a visualizer for one of the remix of Hikaru Nishida's song, "Nice-Catch!" The album peaked at No. 170 on the Oricon charts. On June 18, 2021, he remixed the singles "Catch Me" and "WAKU WAKU sa Sete" by Miho Nakayama alongside releasing a visualizer. In July 2021, he remixed the single "Terefonizumu" by Philosophy no Dance, which was included on their third single on August 18.

On February 1, 2022, the edited compilation "Japanese City Pop 100" was published. On September 25, 2022, it was announced that Night Tempo would provide a song for SKE48 TeamKII's "No Time" performance, which would begin on December 11 of the same year. In 2023, together with Aoi Yagawa and Miori Ichikawa, they debuted as the retro-pop unit Fancylabo.

== Artistry ==
=== Influences ===
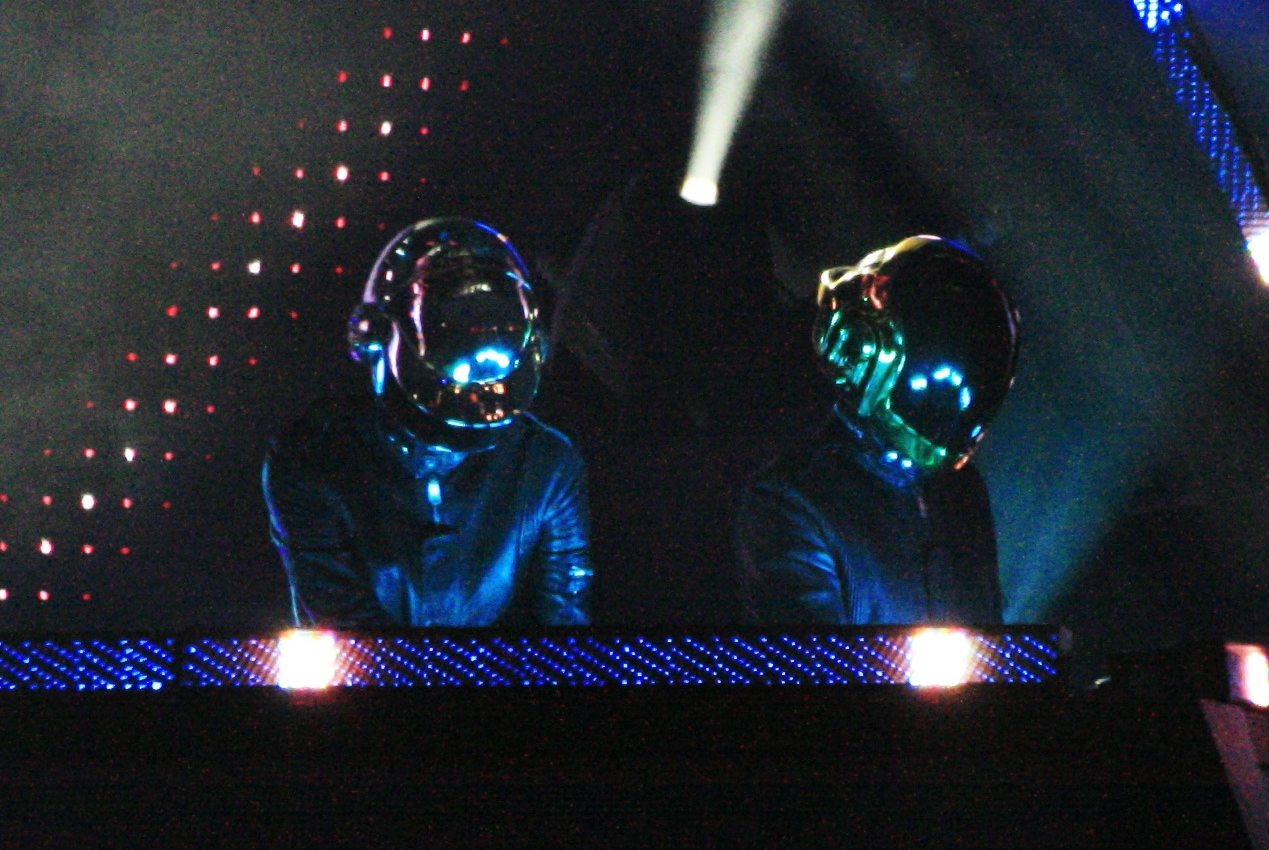
Artists like Daft Punk (pictured) have inspired Night Tempo's music.

Jung influences include Daft Punk, Toshiki Kadomatsu, and Miho Nakayama, stating in an interview that he was fascinated by the music of Nakayama and Kadomatsu. He also discovered Tatsuro Yamashita and Mariya Takeuchi during his time as a programmer. He has also stated that he listens to other future funk artists, namely from the Sailor Team. He is also influenced by singer Eiichi Ohtaki. Night Tempo is active in the U.S. and Japan and is a fan of Sailor Moon.

=== Musical style ===
Jung focuses on future funk and vaporwave, taking inspiration from city pop, Japanese music and pop culture, which reminds him of his childhood in Seoul. He has also cited his time as a programmer working at night "dictated the type of music he listened to and led to his moniker." In his earlier works, he used samples from the anime series Sailor Moon in his tracks.

He has also produced chillhop as a way to get into other varieties of music.

=== Cover arts ===
Jung has frequently linked with artists Namu 13 and Shiho So for cover artwork, inspired by the artstyle of Sailor Moon and the works of Rumiko Takahashi, writer and illustrator of Ranma ½. He has also collaborated with Hiroshi Nagai.

== Discography ==
=== Singles ===
Year	Title	Label	Album/EP
2018	"Come On!" (feat. Super Brass, Tomggg)	Moonrise	Non-album single
2018	"Yumenotsudzuki ~ Dreams Of Light ~"	—N/a	Non-album single
2018	"Better Days" (feat. Puniden, Super Brass)	—N/a	Non-album single
2019	"Tokyo Night Drive"	Neoncity	Non-album single

=== Extended plays ===
Year	Title	Label
2019	Cityscape (Tokyo EP)	Moonlights Company
2019	Cityscape (Yokohama)	Moonlights Company

=== Albums ===
Year	Title	Label	Peak chart positions
Year	Title	Label	Oricon
2016	Soundcloud Collection	—N/a	—
2016	Night Tempo	Neoncity	—
2017	Pure Baby Maker [Rewind]	Neoncity	—
2017	Fantasy	Neoncity	—
2017	Nighty Tape	Moonlights Company	—
2018	Babymaker 2	Neoncity	—
2018	Moonrise	Neoncity, Moonlights Company	—
2018	Pure Present	—N/a	—
2018	Nighty Tape 86'	Moonlights Company	—
2019	Showa Idol's Groove	Moonlights Company	—
2019	Showa Idol's Groove 2	Moonlights Company	—
2019	Yoruin Night Tempo	Neoncity	—
2020	Showa Idol's Groove ・ Finale	—N/a	—
2020	Japanese Pop Edit	—N/a	—
2020	Funk to the Future	Future 1980	—
2021	Shūchū Concentration	Neoncity	—
2021	Night Tempo presents: The Showa Idol Groove	Pony Canyon	170

=== Remixes ===
Date	Title	Original artist(s)	Album / EP	Label
June 26, 2015	"Special To Me (Night Tempo 100% Pure Remastered)"	Wink	Soundcloud Collection (2016)	—N/a
December 7, 2015	"Give Me Up (Night Tempo 100% Pure Remastered)"	BaBe	Soundcloud Collection (2016); Pure Present (2018); BaBe - Night Tempo presents The Showa Groove (2020)	Pony Canyon (Showa Groove)
January 3, 2016	"Mayonaka No Joke (Night Tempo 100% Pure Remastered)"	Takako Mamiya	Soundcloud Collection (2016); Pure Present (2018)	—N/a
March 11, 2016	"Plastic Love (Night Tempo 100% Pure Remastered)"	Mariya Takeuchi	Soundcloud Collection (2016); Pure Present (2018)	—N/a
September 24, 2018	"Darling Darling (Night Tempo 'Future Retro' Remix)"	KZ & Yano Anna	—N/a	—N/a
April 24, 2019	"Samishii Nettaigyo (Night Tempo Showa Groove Mix)"	Wink	Wink - Night Tempo presents The Showa Groove	Polystar
April 24, 2019	"Aiga Tomaranai Turn It Into Love (Night Tempo Showa Groove Mix)"	Wink	Wink - Night Tempo presents The Showa Groove	Polystar
April 24, 2019	"Get My Love (Night Tempo Showa Groove Mix)"	Wink	Wink - Night Tempo presents The Showa Groove	Polystar
April 24, 2019	"Special To Me (Night Tempo 100% Pure Remastered)"	Wink	Wink - Night Tempo presents The Showa Groove	Polystar
July 24, 2019	"Remember Summer Days (Night Tempo Showa Groove Mix)"	Anri	Anri – Night Tempo Presents The Showa Groove	For Life Music
July 24, 2019	"Lady Sunshine (Night Tempo Showa Groove Mix)"	Anri	Anri – Night Tempo Presents The Showa Groove	For Life Music
July 24, 2019	"Love Is a Two Way Street -Kin Mirai no Kandō- (Night Tempo Showa Groove Mix)"	Anri	Anri – Night Tempo Presents The Showa Groove	For Life Music
July 24, 2019	"Groove A･Go･Go (Night Tempo Showa Groove Mix)"	Anri	Anri – Night Tempo Presents The Showa Groove	For Life Music
November 8, 2019	"Kimi wa 1000% (Night Tempo Showa Groove Mix)"	1986 Omega Tribe	1986 Omega Tribe – Night Tempo presents The Showa Groove	VAP
November 8, 2019	"Older Girl (Night Tempo Showa Groove Mix)"	1986 Omega Tribe	1986 Omega Tribe – Night Tempo presents The Showa Groove	VAP
March 17, 2020	"I Don't Know! (Night Tempo Showa Groove Mix)"	BaBe	BaBe – Night Tempo presents The Showa Groove	Pony Canyon
March 17, 2020	"Give Me Up (Night Tempo Showa Groove Mix)"	BaBe	BaBe – Night Tempo presents The Showa Groove	Pony Canyon
April 29, 2020	"Sotsugyō (Night Tempo Showa Groove Mix)"	Yuki Saito	Yuki Saito – Night Tempo presents The Showa Groove	Pony Canyon
April 29, 2020	"Sutorōhatto no Natsu Omoi (Night Tempo Showa Groove Mix)"	Yuki Saito	Yuki Saito – Night Tempo presents The Showa Groove	Pony Canyon
August 7, 2020	"Arashi no Sugao (Night Tempo Showa Groove Mix)"	Shizuka Kudo	Shizuka Kudo – Night Tempo presents The Showa Groove	Pony Canyon
August 7, 2020	"Wain Hitokuchi no Uso (Night Tempo Showa Groove Mix)"	Shizuka Kudo	Shizuka Kudo – Night Tempo presents The Showa Groove	Pony Canyon
February 12, 2021	"Mayonaka no Door (Night Tempo Showa Groove Mix)"	Miki Matsubara	Miki Matsubara – Night Tempo presents The Showa Groove	Pony Canyon
February 12, 2021	"Nītona Gogo 3-ji (Night Tempo Showa Groove Mix)"	Miki Matsubara	Miki Matsubara – Night Tempo presents The Showa Groove	Pony Canyon
June 18, 2021	"Catch Me (Night Tempo Showa Groove Mix)"	Miho Nakayama	Miho Nakayama – Night Tempo presents The Showa Groove	King Records
June 18, 2021	"Waku Waku Sasete (Night Tempo Showa Groove Mix)"	Miho Nakayama	Miho Nakayama – Night Tempo presents The Showa Groove	King Records
August 18, 2021	"Telephonism (Night Tempo Melting Groove Mix)"	The Dance for Philosophy	"Double Standard"	Sony Music

== Concerts ==
Name	Date(s)	Venue or No. of pieces
Wink - Night Tempo presents The Showa Groove Release Party / Japanese Things Vol. 6	April 26, 2019	The Millennials Shibuya
Fuji Rock Festival '19	July 28, 2019	Red Marquee and Ganban Square
WHITE NIGHT WEEK SHIBUYA	November 5, 2019	Shibuya O-East
Night Tempo presents The Showa Groove Tour	November 27, 2019 – December 7, 2019	club evoL Fukuoka (Nov. 27), Live & Lounge Vio (Nov. 28), Club Metro (Kyoto) (Nov. 29), Circus Osaka (Nov. 30), Sound Lab Mole (Dec. 2), Womb Tokyo (Dec. 4), Circus Tokyo (Dec. 7)
Neoncity Super Countdown	December 31, 2019	Circus Tokyo
