= Akira Inoue (musician) =

Japanese musician, arranger and composer

Akira Inoue 井上鑑
- Born: 8 September 1953; Setagaya, Tokyo, Japan
- Occupations: Musician, arranger, composer, producer
- Instrument: Keyboard

Akira Inoue (井上鑑) (born 8 September 1953), is a Japanese keyboard player, composer, arranger and producer. He was the recipient of the 23rd Japan Record Awards arranger award.

== History ==
Inoue was born in Tokyo. His father was the pioneering Japanese cello player Yoritoro Inoue (井上頼豊).

In the late 1970s, he played in the fusion group PARACHUTE. He released his first of many solo albums in the early 1980s.

He has also composed, arranged, and performed music for several films and OVAs, including SF Shinseiki Lensman, Lily C.A.T., and the Japan/West Germany 1984 film Windy Story. In the 1990s, he played in The Voice Project and on projects with Masako Kawamura.

He has produced projects for Anri, Mikio Sakai, Yoriko Ganeko, Masako Kawamura, The Voice Project, Kyosuke Himuro, MOON CHILD, Furukawa Ten-sei, Sojiro, harpist Mai Takematsu, Minako Honda and the Yoshida Brothers.

== Discography ==
=== As solo artist ===
- Tokyo Installation

=== As arranger ===
With Yui Asaka

- C-Girl
- TRUE LOVE
- 恋のロックンロール・サーカス
- Chance!
- ボーイフレンドをつくろう
- Self Control

With The Alfee

- 讃集詩 ALMIGHTY doubt
- 恋人になりたい
- 通り雨
- 泣かないでMY LOVE
- SUNSET SUMMER
- 暁のパラダイス・ロード
- STARSHIP -光を求めて-

With Anri

- Trouble in Paradise

With Ayumi Ishida

- 赤いギヤマン
- 波になって

With Akina Nakamori

- "Futari Shizuka"

With Mioko Yamaguchi

- 夢飛行
- NIRVANA
