= Summer Breeze (Miho Nakayama album) =

Studio album by Miho Nakayama
- Released: July 1, 1986
- Recorded: 1986
- Studio: Nichion Studio; Sound City Studio
- Genre: J-pop; kayōkyoku; dance-pop; teen pop
- Length: 43:47
- Language: Japanese
- Label: King Records
- Producer: Norio Higuchi

Miho Nakayama chronology
After School (1985)	Summer Breeze (1986)	Virgin Flight '86: Miho Nakayama First Concert (1986)

Singles from Summer Breeze
- 1. "Close Up" Released: May 16, 1986

Summer Breeze (サマー・ブリーズ, Samā Burīzu) is the third studio album by Japanese entertainer Miho Nakayama. Released through King Records on July 1, 1986, the album features the single "Close Up". "You're My Only Shinin' Star" was initially not released as a single, but popular demand prompted Nakayama to re-record the song as a stand-alone single, which hit No. 1 in 1988.

The album peaked at No. 8 on Oricon's albums chart and sold over 77,000 copies.

== Track listing ==
Side A
No.	Title	Lyrics	Music	Arrangement	Length
1.	"Tropic Mystery"	Reiko Yukawa	Daisuke Inoue	Jun Irie	4:13
2.	"Close Up" (Kurōzu Appu (クローズ・アップ))	Takashi Matsumoto	Kazuo Zaitsu	Masaaki Ōmura	4:27
3.	"Leave Me Alone"	Toshiki Kadomatsu	Kadomatsu	Kadomatsu	4:42
4.	"Hito Natsu no Actress" (Hito Natsu no Akutoresu (ひと夏のアクトレス; "One Summer Actress"))	Rui Serizawa	Takao Kisugi	Irie	4:32
5.	"Ocean in the Rain"	Yukawa	Inoue	Ōmura	3:32
Total length:					21:25

Side B
No.	Title	Lyrics	Music	Arrangement	Length
1.	"Sign wa Hang Loose" (Sain wa Hangu Rūzu (サインはハングルーズ; "The Sign Is Hanging Loose"))	Yukawa	Inoue	Irie	4:00
2.	"Rising Love"	Kadomatsu	Kadomatsu	Kadomatsu	4:43
3.	"Wagamama" ((わがまま; "Spoiled"))	Hiroko Hosoda	Kisugi	Irie	4:00
4.	"Hitomi no Kageri" (瞳のかげり ("Shadow of the Eyes"))	Matsumoto	Zaitsu	Tatsumi Yano	4:59
5.	"You're My Only Shinin' Star"	Kadomatsu	Kadomatsu	Kadomatsu; Kazuo Ōtani (strings); Shin Kazuhara (brass)	4:39
Total length:					22:21

== Charts ==
Chart (1986)	Peak position
Japanese Albums (Oricon)	8

== See also ==
- 1986 in Japanese music
