= Miho Nakayama Complete DVD Box =

Box set by Miho Nakayama
- Released: July 24, 2003
- Recorded: 1985–2002
- Genre: J-pop; kayōkyoku; dance-pop; teen pop; city pop; pop rock
- Language: Japanese
- Label: King Records

Miho Nakayama chronology
Miho Nakayama Tour '98: Live O Live (1998)	Miho Nakayama Complete DVD Box (2003)	Miho Nakayama 38th Anniversary Concert: Trois (2023)

Miho Nakayama Complete DVD Box is a box set by Japanese entertainer Miho Nakayama. Released through King Records on July 24, 2003, the box set compiles all 15 of Nakayama's video releases on DVD format, plus the new video Camino de Flamenco. Due to copyright issues, the performance of "Hero" was omitted from the Miho Nakayama Concert Tour '95: F disc.

== Track listing ==
DVD 1
No.	Title	Length
1.	"Na-ma-i-ki"
2.	"Virgin Flight '86: Miho Nakayama First Concert"

DVD 2
No.	Title	Length
1.	"Catch Me: Miho Nakayama Live '88"
2.	"Kokoro no Yoake: L'Aube de mon cœur" ((心の夜明け L'Aube de mon cœur; Dawn of My Heart))

DVD 3
No.	Title	Length
1.	"Whuu! Natural Live at Budokan '89"
2.	"Bi Fantasy: Nakayama Miho Oshare no Subete" ((美・ファンタジー／中山美穂おしゃれのすべて; Beauty Fantasy: All About Miho Nakayama's Fashion))
3.	"Love Supreme: Miho Nakayama Selection '90"

DVD 4
No.	Title	Length
1.	"Destiny"
2.	"Miho Nakayama Concert Tour '91: Miho the Future, Miho the Nature"
3.	"Mellow"

DVD 5
No.	Title	Length
1.	"Live in Mellow: Miho Nakayama Concert Tour '92"

DVD 6
No.	Title	Length
1.	"Miho Nakayama Concert Tour '93: On My Mind"

DVD 7
No.	Title	Length
1.	"Miho Nakayama Concert Tour '95: F"

DVD 8
No.	Title	Length
1.	"Miho Nakayama Concert Tour '96: Sound of Lip"

DVD 9
No.	Title	Length
1.	"Miho Nakayama Tour '98: Live O Live"

Bonus DVD
No.	Title	Length
1.	"Camino de Flamenco: Andalusia ni Tsuzuku Michi" ((Camino de Flamenco アンダルシアに続く道; Camino de Flamenco: The Road to Andalusia))
