= Angel Hearts =

Studio album by Miho Nakayama
- Released: December 5, 1988
- Recorded: 1988
- Studios: Onkio Haus; Vincent Studio; Cherry Island Studio; Studio Shangri-la; Sedic Studio; Ocean Way Recording; Smoke Tree Studio
- Genres: J-pop; dance-pop; city pop
- Length: 44:28
- Languages: Japanese; English
- Label: King Records
- Producer: Cindy

Miho Nakayama chronology
| Makin' Dancin' (1988) | Angel Hearts (1988) | Ballads (1989) |

Singles from Angel Hearts
- 1. "Witches" Released: November 14, 1988

Angel Hearts (エンジェル・ハーツ, Enjeru Hātsu) is the eighth studio album by Japanese entertainer Miho Nakayama. Released through King Records on December 5, 1988, the album features the No. 1 single "Witches". "Sweetest Lover", "Too Fast, Too Close", and "Try or Cry", which were all featured in Nakayama's 1988 short film L'Aube de mon cœur.

The album peaked at No. 3 on Oricon's albums chart and sold over 250,000 copies.

== Track listing ==
All lyrics are written by Chinfa Kan, except where indicated.

Side A
| No. | Title | Lyrics | Music | Arrangement | Length |
|---|---|---|---|---|---|
| 1. | "Sweetest Lover" | Mizuho Kitayama | Cindy | Ichizō Seo | 5:26 |
| 2. | "Too Fast, Too Close" | Cindy | Cindy; Yūji Toriyama | Toriyama | 4:22 |
| 3. | "Bad Girl" | | Kunio Muramatsu | Toriyama | 4:43 |
| 4. | "Diamond Lights" | Masami Tozawa | Narumi Hiroshi | Seo | 4:34 |
| 5. | "Tenshi no Kimochi" ((天使の気持ち; "An Angel's Feelings")) | | Cindy | Toriyama | 4:16 |
| Total length: | | | | | 23:21 |

Side B
| No. | Title | Music | Arrangement | Length |
|---|---|---|---|---|
| 1. | "Witches" | Cindy | Toriyama | 4:45 |
| 2. | "Hitomi de Lovin' You" ((瞳でLovin' You; "Lovin' Your Eyes")) | Ichirō Hada | Yoshinobu Kojima | 5:24 |
| 3. | "Please" | Cindy | Toriyama | 4:25 |
| 4. | "Try or Cry" | Cindy | Kojima | 6:33 |
| Total length: | | | | 21:07 |

== Personnel ==
- Miho Nakayama – vocals
- Yūji Toriyama – all instruments (A2, A5, B1, B3)
- Yoshinobu Kojima – all instruments (B2, B4)
- Yasuharu Nakanishi – keyboards (A1, A4)
- Ichirō Nagata – keyboards (A1, A4)
- Haruo Togashi – Piano (A1, A4)
- Tsuyoshi Kon – guitar (A1, A4)
- David T. Walker – guitar (B4)
- Yasuo Tomikura – bass (A1, A4)
- Hideo Yamaki – drums (A1, A4)
- Masato Honda – saxophone (A5, B1)
- Shigeo Fuchino – saxophone (B2, B4)
- Cindy – backing vocals
- P. J. – backing vocals (A1–4)
- Michael Wilson – backing vocals (A1, B1)
- Mine Matsuki – backing vocals (A1, B3)
- Kumi Sasaki – backing vocals (except A2)
- Melody McColly – backing vocals (A2–3)
- Terrence Forsythe – backing vocals (A2–3)

== Charts ==
Weekly charts

| Chart (1988) | Peak position |
|---|---|
| Japanese Albums (Oricon) | 3 |

Year-end charts

| Chart (1989) | Peak position |
|---|---|
| Japanese Albums (Oricon) | 44 |

== See also ==
- 1988 in Japanese music
