= Trouble in Paradise (Anri album) =

Studio album by Anri
- Released: 1986
- Recorded: Unknown
- Genre: Pop; city pop
- Label: For Life Records
- Producer: Akira Inoue

Anri chronology
| The Anri (1986) | Trouble in Paradise (1986) | Summer Farewell (1987) |

Trouble in Paradise is a 1986 J-pop album by Anri and released by For Life Records. This was Anri's tenth studio album.

== Track listings ==
All songs arranged by Akira Inoue.

| No. | Title | Lyrics | Music | Length |
|---|---|---|---|---|
| 1. | "The Pages of Your History" | Inoue | Inoue | 4:49 |
| 2. | "Time Out" | Yumi Yoshimoto | Toshinobu Kubota; Ichiro Hada | 3:51 |
| 3. | "Imitation Lover" | Shinji Harada | Shinji Harada | 5:24 |
| 4. | "The Torch" | Sonobe Kazunori | Hada | 4:58 |
| 5. | "A Slow Boat to Heart" | Yoshimoto | Anri | 5:24 |
| 6. | "Trouble in Paradise" | Yoshimoto | Delroy Murray; Robin Achampong; Carl Sturken; Evan Rogers | 4:28 |
| 7. | "Precious Time" | Yui Masaki | Hiroshi Sato | 4:16 |
| 8. | "Fallen Angel" | Yoshimoto | Anri | 3:17 |
| 9. | "Christmas Calendar" | Yoshimoto | Anri | 4:42 |
| 10. | "Curtain Call" | Masaki | Sato | 5:34 |

== Personnel ==
- Anri – vocals
- Akira Inoue: keyboards
- Nobuo Tsunetomi – acoustic guitar
- Ian Bairnson – guitar
- David Rhodes – guitar
- Pandit Dinesh – Indian percussion
- Tony Beard – drums
- Bill Bruford – drums
- Simon Phillips – drums
- Laurence Cottle – bass (credited as Lawrence Cottle)
- Graham Edwards – bass
- Felix Krish – bass
- Mark Feltham – harmonica
- Delroy Murray – male backing vocals
- Robin Achampong – male backing vocals
- Carol Kenyon – female backing vocals
- Johnathan Sorrel – synclavier programming
- Rimi Shionaya – programming

== Chart positions ==
=== Weekly charts ===
| Year | Country | Chart | Position | Sales |
|---|---|---|---|---|
| 1986 | Japan | Oricon Weekly LP Albums Chart | 14 | 23,000 |
| 1986 | Japan | Oricon Weekly CT Albums Chart | 17 | 12,000 |
| 1986 | Japan | Oricon Weekly CD Albums Chart | 9 | 26,000 |
