= Jeweluna =

Studio album by Miho Nakayama
- Released: July 18, 1990
- Recorded: 1990
- Genres: J-pop; dance-pop; R&B
- Length: 48:12
- Language: Japanese
- Label: King Records
- Producers: Gorō Matsui; Miho Nakayama

Miho Nakayama chronology
All for You (1990)	Jeweluna (1990)	Collection II (1990)

Singles from Jeweluna
- 1. "Megamitachi no Bōken" Released: July 11, 1990; 2. "Kore kara no I Love You" Released: February 12, 1991

Jeweluna (ジュウェルナ, Juueruna) is the 12th studio album by Japanese entertainer Miho Nakayama. Released through King Records on July 18, 1990, the album features the singles "Megamitachi no Bōken" and "Kore kara no I Love You".

The album peaked at No. 3 on Oricon's albums chart and sold over 112,000 copies.

== Track listing ==
All lyrics are written by Gorō Matsui, except where indicated.

No.	Title	Lyrics	Music	Arrangement	Length
1.	"Kuchibiru" ((くちびる; "Mouth"))	Miho Nakayama	Nakayama	Takao Sugiyama	4:10
2.	"Soshite Sono Natsu" ((そしてその夏; "And That Summer"))	Nakayama	Nakayama	Tomoji Sogawa	5:00
3.	"Megamitachi no Bōken" ((女神たちの冒険; "The Adventures of the Goddesses"))		Hideo Saitō	Saitō	4:08
4.	"Yaban na Hōseki" ((野蛮な宝石; "Barbaric Jewel"))		Saitō	Saitō	4:37
5.	"Nakanai Yubiwa" ((泣かない指輪; "A Ring That Does Not Cry"))		Kenji Hayashida	Sugiyama	4:37
6.	"Vermilion Crime"		Keizo Nakanishi; Takao Konishi	Konishi; Nakanishi (chorus)	4:35
7.	"Byōyomi no Jealousy" (秒読みのJealousy ("Countdown to Jealousy"))		Nakanishi; Konishi	Konishi; Nakanishi (chorus)	4:46
8.	"Kore kara no I Love You" ((これからのI Love You; "This Is I Love You"))		Kenjirō Sakiya	Sakiya	5:57
9.	"Tengoku e no Kagi" ((天国への鍵; "The Key to Heaven"))	Nakayama	Nakayama	Sogawa	4:49
10.	"Shiroi Suna no La Mer" (Shiroi Suna no Ra Mēru (白い砂のラ・メール; "La Mer in the White Sand"))		Sakiya	Sakiya	5:13
Total length:					48:12

== Charts ==
Chart (1990)	Peak position
Japanese Albums (Oricon)	3

== See also ==
- 1990 in Japanese music
