= Timely!! =

Studio album by Anri
- Released: December 5, 1983
- Genres: City pop; J-pop
- Length: 41:30
- Label: For Life
- Producer: Toshiki Kadomatsu

Anri chronology
Bi・Ki・Ni (1983)	Timely!! (1983)	Coool (1984)

Singles from Timely!!
- 1. "Cat's Eye" Released: August 5, 1983; 2. "I Can't Stop the Loneliness" Released: November 5, 1983

Timely!! is the sixth studio album by Japanese singer-songwriter Anri. It was released in 1983 and was a collaborative effort with musician and producer Toshiki Kadomatsu.

It is considered one of her best releases and cited as a catalyst for popularizing city pop in the West.

The single, "Cat's Eye", served as the opening for the 1983 anime series Cat's Eye. It was one of the highest selling singles in Japan in 1983, remaining number-one for five consecutive weeks. The single was re-recorded for the album and was later covered by girl group MAX in 2010.

== Track listing ==
Side one
No.	Title	Lyrics	Music	Length
1.	"Cat's Eye (New Take)"	Yoshiko Miura	Yuichiro Oda	3:10
2.	"Windy Summer"	Toshiki Kadomatsu	Kadomatsu	4:07
3.	"Stay by Me"	Kadomatsu	Kadomatsu	3:37
4.	"A Hope from Sad Street"	Anri	Anri	4:19
5.	"You Are Not Alone"	Chinfa Kan	Tetsuji Hayashi	4:05

Side two
No.	Title	Lyrics	Music	Length
6.	"悲しみがとまらない" (Kanashimi ga Tomaranai; "I Can't Stop the Loneliness")	Kan	Hayashi	4:25
7.	"Shyness Boy"	Kadomatsu	Kadomatsu	3:15
8.	"Lost Love in the Rain"	Kadomatsu	Anri	4:19
9.	"Driving My Love"	Kadomatsu	Kadomatsu	4:51
10.	"Good-Night for You"	Kadomatsu	Kadomatsu	5:18
Total length:				41:30

2008 reissue bonus track
No.	Title	Lyrics	Music	Length
11.	"Remember Summer Days"	Kadomatsu	Kadomatsu	4:55

== Chart positions ==
=== Weekly charts ===
Year	Country	Chart	Position	Sales
1983	Japan	Oricon Weekly LP Albums Chart	1	314,000
1983	Japan	Oricon Weekly CT Albums Chart	2	196,000

=== Year-end charts ===
Year	Country	Chart	Position	Sales
1984	Japan	Oricon Yearly Albums Chart	10	509,000

== See also ==
- 1983 in Japanese music
