= Catch the Nite =

Studio album by Miho Nakayama
- Released: February 10, 1988
- Recorded: 1987
- Genres: J-pop; city pop; dance-pop
- Length: 46:18
- Language: Japanese
- Label: King Records
- Producer: Toshiki Kadomatsu

Miho Nakayama chronology
Collection (1987)	Catch the Nite (1988)	Mind Game (1988)

Singles from Catch the Nite
- 1. "Catch Me" Released: October 7, 1987

Catch the Nite (キャッチ・ザ・ナイト, Kyatchi za Naito) is the sixth studio album by Japanese entertainer Miho Nakayama. Released through King Records on February 10, 1988, the album features the No. 1 single "Catch Me". It was produced by Toshiki Kadomatsu, who composed majority of the album's songs.

The album became Nakayama's second to hit No. 1 on Oricon's albums chart. It sold over 349,000 copies.

== Track listing ==
All tracks are written and arranged by Toshiki Kadomatsu, except where indicated.

Side A
No.	Title	Lyrics	Music	Arrangement	Length
1.	"Overture" (Instrumental)				0:53
2.	"Misty Love"				5:04
3.	"Triangle Love Affair"	Yui Masaki	Hiroshi Satō	Satō	4:42
4.	"Sherry"				4:36
5.	"Snow White no Machi" (Sunō Howaito no Machi (スノー・ホワイトの街; "Snow White Town"))	Masaki	Satō	Satō	4:14
Total length:					19:29

Side B
No.	Title	Lyrics	Music	Length
1.	"Catch Me"			4:39
2.	"Just My Lover"			4:56
3.	"Far Away from Summer Days"			6:24
4.	"Get Your Love Tonight"	Kensaku Saitō	Hideki Fujisawa	4:05
5.	"Kabin" ((花瓶; "Vase"))			6:45
Total length:				26:50

== Personnel ==
- Miho Nakayama – vocals
- Toshiki Kadomatsu – backing vocals
- Yurie Kokubu – backing vocals (B3, B5)
- Hideki Fujisawa – backing vocals (B3, B5)
- Kazumi Miyaura – backing vocals (A2–4, B1–2, B4)
- Jackey – backing vocals (A2–4, B2, B4)
- Hiroshi Sato – backing vocals (A5)
- Yui Masaki – backing vocals (A3, A5)
- Eve – backing vocals (A3)
- Masako Suzuki – backing vocals (B1)

== Charts ==
Weekly charts

Chart (1988)	Peak position
Japanese Albums (Oricon)	1

Year-end charts

Chart (1988)	Peak position
Japanese Albums (Oricon)	20

== See also ==
- 1988 in Japanese music
