= Tiny Scandal =

Studio album by Toshiki Kadomatsu
- Released: December 11, 2024
- Genre: Jazz fusion
- Length: 39:46
- Label: Ariola Japan
- Producer: Toshiki Kadomatsu

Toshiki Kadomatsu chronology
Magic Hour: Lovers at Dusk (2024)	Tiny Scandal (2024)	Forgotten Shores (2025)

Tiny Scandal is a guitar instrumental album by Japanese singer-songwriter and guitarist Toshiki Kadomatsu, released on December 11, 2024, by Ariola Japan. It is the second album in Kadomatsu's Contemporary Urban Music series and his first new guitar instrumental album since Legacy of You (1990), 34 years earlier.

The album contains six compositions by Kadomatsu and two cover songs, Hiroshi Sato's "Evening Shadows" and "Tequila Mockingbird", a composition by Larry Dunn.

== Background and production ==
Tiny Scandal followed Magic Hour: Lovers at Dusk, released seven months earlier as the first installment in Kadomatsu's Contemporary Urban Music series. Kadomatsu conceived the series as his response to the renewed international interest in 1980s Japanese city pop, drawing on the music and studio techniques of the 1970s and 1980s while combining musicians of his generation with younger players and contemporary recording methods.

Kadomatsu had received requests from listeners for another instrumental album but said that he had not previously found the right opportunity to make one. He wanted to complete an instrumental album during 2024, describing it as part of his intention to finish musical ideas he had long wanted to pursue.

The album draws on music that influenced Kadomatsu from the late 1960s through the 1980s. He described the compositions as technically demanding despite wanting the performances to sound relaxed.

Kadomatsu recorded the album at his private studio and handled its mixing and mastering himself. He said that advances in recording software had enabled him to carry out the entire production process there rather than relying on outside studios and engineers.

== Songs ==
"NOA" opens the album, followed by "Summer Scenery". Stereo Sound described "NOA" as having an urban character and associated "Summer Scenery" and "Flowing Shiny Hair" with the fusion sound of Kadomatsu's work in the 1990s.

"MIDTOWN" and "SOEMONCHO STREET" date from Kadomatsu's plans for an instrumental album around the time of his first Kadomatsu Play the Guitar tour in 2011. He wrote the two pieces in anticipation of a future instrumental project.

"SOEMONCHO STREET" takes its name from Sōemonchō, an entertainment district in Osaka. Kadomatsu traced the title to his experience at age 19, when a customer at a bar where he was working as a singer and guitarist requested "Sōemonchō Blues", a song he did not know. After his debut he visited the district and became a frequent visitor after a friend opened a soul bar there. For the recording, he based the atmosphere of the piece on his memories of the district during the 1980s and 1990s.

The album includes two cover songs, "Evening Shadows" by Hiroshi Sato and "Tequila Mockingbird" by Larry Dunn. Kadomatsu said that he had wanted to record both songs for years if he made another instrumental album. His association with Sato began when Sato played piano on Kadomatsu's 1984 album After 5 Clash; the two continued working together on later recordings.

Kadomatsu had listened to Ramsey Lewis's recording of "Tequila Mockingbird" since high school and cited it as an important musical influence. His arrangement for Tiny Scandal combines elements of Lewis's original instrumental recording with Dee Dee Bridgewater's vocal version. The recording credits Roxanne Seeman as lyricist and Dunn as composer, with vocals by Mari Okonogi and Akio.

== Release and reception ==
Tiny Scandal was released on December 11, 2024. Kadomatsu had performed several pieces from the album during his Billboard tour beginning in October, before the album's release.

The album debuted at number 11 on the Oricon weekly albums chart. It also debuted at number 12 on Oricon's weekly digital albums chart and number 15 on its combined albums chart. During the first three days of its release week, it was at number eight on Billboard Japan's Download Albums chart with 132 downloads.

Writing for Otonano, TOMC characterized the album as a skillful and fresh guitar instrumental record and highlighted the balance between Kadomatsu's musical influences and a sound accessible to contemporary listeners. The review highlighted the funky "NOA" and the drum-break opening of "MIDTOWN", and described the album as avoiding the overly pop-oriented melodies and displays of instrumental technique associated with some 1980s fusion.

== Track listing ==
Tiny Scandal track listing
No.	Title	Writer(s)	Length
1.	"NOA"	Toshiki Kadomatsu	5:04
2.	"Summer Scenery"	Kadomatsu	3:58
3.	"MIDTOWN"	Kadomatsu	5:36
4.	"Evening Shadows"	Hiroshi Sato	4:31
5.	"SOEMONCHO STREET"	Kadomatsu	5:23
6.	"Flowing Shiny Hair"	Kadomatsu	4:42
7.	"Tequila Mockingbird"	Larry Dunn (music), Roxanne Seeman (lyrics)	5:19
8.	"Tiny Scandal"	Kadomatsu	5:13
Total length:			39:46

== Personnel ==
Credits adapted from Qobuz.

- Toshiki Kadomatsu – producer, arranger, guitar, mixing, mastering
- Maoki Yamamoto - drums
- Kaoru Yamauchi - electric bass
- Hidetoshi Suzuki - guitar solo (3, 5, 7)
- Toshiyuki Mori - Fender Rhodes piano (1-7)
- Masato Honda - NuRAD (1), saxophone (1-3, 5-7)
- Anna Kusakabe, Kotaro Kobayashi - cello (2, 7)
- Eri Iwane, Tomohiro Kobayashi - viola (2, 7)
- Hitoshi Konno, Kyoko Ishigame, Nami Koizumi, Naoko Wakatabi, Natsue Kameda, Osamu Iyoku, Shiori Watanabe, Yuki Nakajima, Yuri Horiuchi, Michele Ran - violin (2, 7)
- Eijiro Nakagawa - Trombone (4, 7)
- Eric Miyashiro, Teppei Kawakami - Trumpet and flugelhorn (7)
- Shutaro Matsui - flugelhorn (8)
- Mari Okonogi – vocals on "Tequila Mockingbird"
- Akio – vocals on "Tequila Mockingbird"

== Charts ==
Chart performance for Tiny Scandal
Chart (2024)	Peak position
Japanese Albums (Oricon)	11
Japanese Digital Albums (Oricon)	12
Japanese Combined Albums (Oricon)	15
