= Mermaid (Miho Nakayama song) =

1988 single by Miho Nakayama

Single by Miho Nakayama

from the album Collection II
- Language: Japanese
- B-side: "In the Morning"
- Released: July 11, 1988
- Recorded: 1988
- Genre: J-pop; dance-pop; city pop
- Length: 4:10
- Label: King Records
- Composer: Cindy
- Lyricist: Chinfa Kan
- Producer: Akira Fukuzumi

Miho Nakayama singles chronology
"You're My Only Shinin' Star" (1988)	"Mermaid" (1988)	"Witches" (1988)

"Mermaid" (人魚姫 mermaid, Māmeido) is the 13th single by Japanese entertainer Miho Nakayama. Written by Chinfa Kan and Cindy, the single was released on July 11, 1988, by King Records.

== Background and release ==
"Mermaid" marked the beginning of Nakayama's collaboration with songwriters Kan and Cindy, which lasted until "Rosécolor" (though Cindy sporadically continued to co-write songs with Nakayama throughout the 1990s). The song was used as the opening theme of the TBS drama series Waka Okusama wa Udemakuri! (若奥さまは腕まくり!; The Young Wife Rolls Her Arms!), which starred Nakayama.

The jacket cover is a painting of Nakayama in a bikini by Robert Blue; this artwork was also used on her album Mind Game.

"Mermaid" became Nakayama's third consecutive No. 1 on Oricon's weekly singles chart and sold over 365,000 copies, becoming her biggest-selling single until "Tōi Machi no Doko ka de..." in 1991.

== Track listing ==
7" single
No.	Title	Lyrics	Music	Arrangement	Length
1.	"Mermaid" (Māmeido (人魚姫 mermaid))	Chinfa Kan	Cindy	Rod Antoon	4:10
2.	"In the Morning"	Masumi Kawamura	Toshinobu Kubota	Takao Sugiyama	5:23

== Personnel ==
- Miho Nakayama – vocals
- Rod Antoon – keyboards, backing vocals (1)
- Takao Sugiyama – synthesizer, drum programming (2)
- Shinji Shiotsugu – guitar (1)
- Ichirō Hada – guitar (2)
- Kitarō – bass synthesizer (2)
- Cindy – backing vocals (1)
- Amazons – backing vocals (2)

== Charts ==
Weekly charts

Chart (1988)	Peak position
Oricon Weekly Singles Chart	1
The Best Ten	1
Uta no Top Ten	1

Year-end charts

Chart (1988)	Peak position
Oricon Year-End Chart	9
The Best Ten Year-End Chart	4
Uta no Top Ten	5

== See also ==
- 1988 in Japanese music
