= Close Up (Miho Nakayama song) =

1986 single by Miho Nakayama

Single by Miho Nakayama

from the album Summer Breeze
- Language: Japanese
- B-side: "Hitomi no Kageri"
- Released: May 16, 1986
- Recorded: 1986
- Genre: J-pop; kayōkyoku; teen pop
- Label: King Records
- Composer: Kazuo Zaitsu
- Lyricist: Takashi Matsumoto

Miho Nakayama singles chronology
"Iro White Blend" (1986)	"Close Up" (1986)	"Jingi Aishite Moraimasu" (1986)

"Close Up" (クローズ・アップ, Kurōzu Appu) is the fifth single by Japanese entertainer Miho Nakayama. Written by Takashi Matsumoto and Kazuo Zaitsu, the single was released on May 16, 1986, by King Records.

== Background and release ==
"Close Up" marked Nakayama's first collaboration with composer Kazuo Zaitsu and arranger Masaaki Ōmura; Matsumoto, Zaitsu, and Ōmura previously worked together on songs for Seiko Matsuda.

"Close Up" peaked at No. 4 on Oricon's weekly singles chart and sold over 128,000 copies.

== Track listing ==
All lyrics are written by Takashi Matsumoto; all music is composed by Kazuo Zaitsu.

7" single
No.	Title	Arrangement	Length
1.	"Close Up" (Kurōzu Appu (クローズ・アップ))	Masaaki Ōmura
2.	"Hitomi no Kageri" ((瞳のかげり; "Shadow of the Eyes"))	Tatsumi Yano

== Charts ==
Weekly charts

Chart (1986)	Peak position
Oricon Weekly Singles Chart	4
The Best Ten	4
Uta no Top Ten	3

Year-end charts

Chart (1986)	Peak position
Oricon Year-End Chart	95

== See also ==
- 1986 in Japanese music
