= Megamitachi no Bōken =

1990 single by Miho Nakayama

Single by Miho Nakayama

from the album Jeweluna
- Language: Japanese
- English title: The Adventures of the Goddesses
- B-side: "Too Fast, Too Close (Dance Version)"
- Released: July 11, 1990
- Recorded: 1990
- Genre: J-pop; dance-pop
- Label: King Records
- Composer: Hideo Saitō
- Lyricist: Gorō Matsui

Miho Nakayama singles chronology
"Semi-sweet Magic" (1990)	"Megamitachi no Bōken" (1990)	"Aishiterutte Iwanai!" (1991)

"Megamitachi no Bōken" (女神たちの冒険; "The Adventures of the Goddesses") is the 19th single by Japanese entertainer Miho Nakayama. Written by Gorō Matsui and Hideo Saitō, the single was released on July 11, 1990, by King Records.

== Background and release ==
Like the previous single "Semi-sweet Magic", "Megamitachi no Bōken" was used by Kyōwa Saitama Bank for their commercial featuring Nakayama. The song was composed and arranged by Saitō, who is best known for his collaborations with Chisato Moritaka.

The B-side is a remix of "Too Fast, Too Close", an English-language song originally from Nakayama's 1988 album Angel Hearts.

"Megamitachi no Bōken" became Nakayama's second straight No. 3 on Oricon's weekly singles chart and sold over 119,000 copies.

== Track listing ==
7" single
No.	Title	Lyrics	Music	Arrangement	Length
1.	"Megamitachi no Bōken" ((女神たちの冒険; "The Adventures of the Goddesses"))	Gorō Matsui	Hideo Saitō	Saitō
2.	"Too Fast, Too Close" (Dance Version)	Cindy	Cindy	Yūji Toriyama

== Charts ==
Chart (1990)	Peak position
Oricon Weekly Singles Chart	3

== See also ==
- 1990 in Japanese music
