= Semi-sweet Magic =

1990 single by Miho Nakayama

Single by Miho Nakayama

from the album All for You
- Language: Japanese
- B-side: "Save Your Love"
- Released: March 21, 1990
- Recorded: 1989
- Genre: J-pop; dance-pop
- Label: King Records
- Composer: Cindy
- Lyricist: Gorō Matsui

Miho Nakayama singles chronology
"Midnight Taxi" (1990)	"Semi-sweet Magic" (1990)	"Megamitachi no Bōken" (1990)

"Semi-sweet Magic" (セミスウィートの魔法, Semisūīto no Mahō) is the 18th single by Japanese entertainer Miho Nakayama. Written by Gorō Matsui and Cindy, the single was released on March 21, 1990, by King Records.

== Background and release ==
"Semi-sweet Magic" was used by Kyōwa Saitama Bank for their commercial featuring Nakayama.

"Semi-sweet Magic" peaked at No. 3 on Oricon's weekly singles chart and sold over 122,000 copies.

== Track listing ==
All music is composed by Cindy.

7" single
No.	Title	Lyrics	Arrangement	Length
1.	"Semi-sweet Magic" (Semisūīto no Mahō (セミスウィートの魔法))	Gorō Matsui	Rod Antoon; Cindy (chorus)
2.	"Save Your Love"	Miho Nakayama	Yūji Toriyama

== Charts ==
Chart (1990)	Peak position
Oricon Weekly Singles Chart	3

== See also ==
- 1990 in Japanese music
