= Namaiki =

1985 single by Miho Nakayama

Single by Miho Nakayama

from the album After School
- Language: Japanese
- English title: Saucy
- B-side: "U"
- Released: October 1, 1985
- Recorded: 1985
- Genre: J-pop; kayōkyoku; synth-pop; teen pop
- Label: King Records
- Composer: Kyōhei Tsutsumi
- Lyricist: Takashi Matsumoto

Miho Nakayama singles chronology
"C" (1985)	"Namaiki" (1985)	"Be-Bop High School" (1985)

"Namaiki" (生意気; lit. "Saucy") is the second single by Japanese entertainer Miho Nakayama. Written by Takashi Matsumoto and Kyōhei Tsutsumi, the single was released on October 1, 1985, by King Records.

== Background and release ==
"Namaiki" was written by Matsumoto as a tale of heartbreak, depicting a girl travelling to a foreign country to heal from her emotional wounds.

"Namaiki" peaked at No. 8 on Oricon's weekly singles chart and sold over 114,000 copies, becoming Nakayama's first top-10 hit.

== Track listing ==
7" single
No.	Title	Lyrics	Music	Arrangement	Length
1.	"Namaiki" ((生意気; "Saucy"))	Takashi Matsumoto	Kyōhei Tsutsumi	Motoki Funayama
2.	"U"	Yūho Iwasato	Mio Iwasato	Mitsuo Hagita

== Charts ==
Chart (1985)	Peak position
Oricon Weekly Singles Chart	8
The Best Ten	11
The Top Ten	10

== See also ==
- 1985 in Japanese music
