= Witches (song) =

1988 single by Miho Nakayama

Single by Miho Nakayama

from the album Angel Hearts
- Language: Japanese
- B-side: "Chikai wo Yabutte"
- Released: November 14, 1988
- Recorded: 1988
- Genre: J-pop; dance-pop; city pop
- Label: King Records
- Composer: Cindy
- Lyricist: Chinfa Kan

Miho Nakayama singles chronology
"Mermaid" (1988)	"Witches" (1988)	"Rosécolor" (1989)

"Witches" (ウィッチズ, Uitchizu) is the 14th single by Japanese entertainer Miho Nakayama. Written by Chinfa Kan and Cindy, the single was released on November 14, 1988, by King Records.

== Background and release ==
Following the success of Nakyama's 13th single "Mermaid" songwriters Kan and Cindy continued the fantasy concept with "Witches".

"Witches" became Nakayama's fourth consecutive No. 1 on Oricon's weekly singles chart and sold over 314,000 copies. The song also won the Grand Prix at the 17th FNS Music Festival.

Nakayama performed the song on the 39th Kōhaku Uta Gassen in 1988, making her debut on NHK's New Year's Eve special.

== Track listing ==
All lyrics are written by Chinfa Kan; all music is composed by Cindy.

7" single
No.	Title	Arrangement	Length
1.	"Witches"	Yūji Toriyama
2.	"Chikai wo Yabutte" ((誓いを破って; "Break the Vow"))	Kunio Muramatsu

== Charts ==
Weekly charts

Chart (1988)	Peak position
Oricon Weekly Singles Chart	1
The Best Ten	2
Uta no Top Ten	1

Year-end charts

Chart (1988)	Peak position
Oricon Year-End Chart	98
The Best Ten Year-End Chart	72

Chart (1989)	Peak position
Oricon Year-End Chart	36
The Best Ten Year-End Chart	28

== See also ==
- 1988 in Japanese music
