= Rosécolor =

1989 single by Miho Nakayama

Single by Miho Nakayama

from the album Collection II
- Language: Japanese
- B-side: "You and I"
- Released: February 21, 1989
- Recorded: 1988
- Genre: J-pop
- Label: King Records
- Composer: Cindy
- Lyricist: Chinfa Kan

Miho Nakayama singles chronology
"Witches" (1988)	"Rosécolor" (1989)	"Virgin Eyes" (1989)

"Rosécolor" (ロゼカラー, Rozekarā) is the 15th single by Japanese entertainer Miho Nakayama. Written by Chinfa Kan and Cindy, the single was released on February 21, 1989, by King Records.

== Background and release ==
"Rosécolor" was used by Shiseido for their spring 1989 commercials featuring Nakayama.

"Rosécolor" became Nakayama's fifth consecutive No. 1 on Oricon's weekly singles chart. It sold over 277,000 copies and was certified Gold by the RIAJ.

Cindy self-covered the song on her 1991 album Don't Be Afraid and the 1997 album Surprise.

== Track listing ==
All music is arranged by Yūji Toriyama.

7" single
No.	Title	Lyrics	Music	Length
1.	"Rosécolor"	Chinfa Kan	Cindy
2.	"You and I"	Cindy	Greg Moore

== Charts ==
Weekly charts

Chart (1989)	Peak position
Oricon Weekly Singles Chart	1
The Best Ten	5
Uta no Top Ten	3

Year-end charts

Chart (1989)	Peak position
Oricon Year-End Chart	27
The Best Ten Year-End Chart	18

== Certification ==
Region	Certification	Certified units/sales
Japan (RIAJ)	Gold	200,000^{^}
^{^} Shipments figures based on certification alone.

== See also ==
- 1989 in Japanese music
