= Virgin Eyes =

1989 single by Miho Nakayama

Single by Miho Nakayama

from the album Hide 'n' Seek
- Language: Japanese
- B-side: "Sanctuary"
- Released: July 12, 1989
- Recorded: 1989
- Genre: J-pop; dance-pop
- Label: King Records
- Composer: Anri
- Lyricist: Yumi Yoshimoto

Miho Nakayama singles chronology
"Rosécolor" (1989)	"Virgin Eyes" (1989)	"Midnight Taxi" (1990)

"Virgin Eyes" (ヴァージン・アイズ, Vājin Aizu) is the 16th single by Japanese entertainer Miho Nakayama. Written by Yumi Yoshimoto and Anri, the single was released on July 12, 1989, by King Records.

== Background and release ==
"Virgin Eyes" was used as the theme song of the 1989 film Who Do I Choose?, which starred Nakayama in a supporting role.

"Virgin Eyes" peaked at No. 2 on Oricon's weekly singles chart. It sold over 254,000 copies and was certified Gold by the RIAJ.

Nakayama performed the song on the 40th Kōhaku Uta Gassen in 1989.

== Track listing ==
All lyrics are written by Yumi Yoshimoto; all music is composed by Anri.

7" single
No.	Title	Arrangement	Length
1.	"Virgin Eyes"	Yasuharu Ogura
2.	"Sanctuary" (Sankuchuari (サンクチュアリ〜Sanctuary〜))	Ogura; Kazuo Ōtani (strings)

== Charts ==
Weekly charts

Chart (1989)	Peak position
Oricon Weekly Singles Chart	2
The Best Ten	6
Uta no Top Ten	6

Year-end charts

Chart (1989)	Peak position
Oricon Year-End Chart	32

== Certification ==
Region	Certification	Certified units/sales
Japan (RIAJ)	Gold	200,000^{^}
^{^} Shipments figures based on certification alone.

== See also ==
- 1989 in Japanese music
