= C (song) =

1985 single by Miho Nakayama

Single by Miho Nakayama

from the album C
- Language: Japanese
- B-side: "Speed Way"
- Released: June 21, 1985
- Recorded: 1985
- Genre: J-pop; kayōkyoku; synth-pop; teen pop
- Label: King Records
- Composer: Kyōhei Tsutsumi
- Lyricist: Takashi Matsumoto

Miho Nakayama singles chronology
"C" (1985)	"Namaiki" (1985)

"C" (stylized as "「C」") is the debut single by Japanese entertainer Miho Nakayama. Written by Takashi Matsumoto and Kyōhei Tsutsumi, the single was released on June 21, 1985, by King Records.

== Background and release ==
Aside from being her debut single, "C" marked the beginning of her collaboration with songwriters Matsumoto and Tsutsumi, who went on to write songs on her first four albums. The song was used as the opening theme of the TBS drama series Natsu Taiken Monogatari (夏・体験物語; Summer Experience Story), which starred Nakayama.

"C" peaked at No. 12 on Oricon's weekly singles chart and sold over 170,000 copies. The song earned Nakayama the Best New Artist award at the 27th Japan Record Awards and the Best Newcomer Award at the 23rd Golden Arrow Awards.

Nakayama self-covered the song on her 2019 album Neuf Neuf.

== Track listing ==
All lyrics are written by Takashi Matsumoto; all music is arranged by Mitsuo Hagita.

7" single
No.	Title	Music	Length
1.	"C"	Kyōhei Tsutsumi
2.	"Speed Way" (Supīdo Uei (スピード・ウェイ))	Tetsuji Hayashi

== Charts ==
Weekly charts

Chart (1985)	Peak position
Oricon Weekly Singles Chart	12
The Best Ten	15

Year-end charts

Chart (1985)	Peak position
Oricon Year-End Chart	67

== See also ==
- 1985 in Japanese music
