= Catch Me (Miho Nakayama song) =

1987 single by Miho Nakayama

Single by Miho Nakayama

from the album Catch the Nite
- Language: Japanese
- B-side: "Bad Boy"
- Released: October 7, 1987
- Recorded: 1987
- Genre: J-pop; dance-pop
- Label: King Records
- Composer: Toshiki Kadomatsu
- Lyricist: Toshiki Kadomatsu
- Producer: Toshiki Kadomatsu

Miho Nakayama singles chronology
"50/50" (1987)	"Catch Me" (1987)	"You're My Only Shinin' Star" (1988)

Alternative cover
- Night Tempo Presents Miho Nakayama: The Showa Groove

Music videos
- "Catch Me (Night Tempo Showa Groove Mix)" on YouTube

"Catch Me" (キャッチ・ミー, Kyatchi Mī) is the 11th single by Japanese entertainer Miho Nakayama. Written and produced by Toshiki Kadomatsu, the single was released on October 7, 1987, by King Records. A remix of the song by Korean DJ Night Tempo was released on streaming media on June 18, 2021.

== Background and release ==
"Catch Me" was used as the opening theme of the Fuji TV drama series Ohima nara Kite yo Ne! (おヒマなら来てよネ!; If You're Free, Come On!), which starred Nakayama.

"Catch Me" became Nakayama's first No. 1 on Oricon's weekly singles chart and sold over 218,000 copies.

== Track listing ==
7" single
No.	Title	Lyrics	Music	Arrangement	Length
1.	"Catch Me"	Toshiki Kadomatsu	Kadomatsu	Kadomatsu
2.	"Bad Boy"	Shun Taguchi	HALNEN	Shirō Sagisu

Night Tempo Presents Miho Nakayama: The Showa Groove
No.	Title	Lyrics	Music	Arrangement	Length
1.	"Catch Me [Night Tempo Showa Groove Mix]"	Kadomatsu	Kadomatsu	Night Tempo
2.	"Waku Waku Sasete [Night Tempo Showa Groove Mix]" ((WAKU WAKUさせて; "Excite Me More"))	Takashi Matsumoto	Kyōhei Tsutsumi	Night Tempo

== Charts ==
Weekly charts

Chart (1987)	Peak position
Oricon Weekly Singles Chart	1
The Best Ten	2
Uta no Top Ten	2

Year-end charts

Chart (1987)	Peak position
Oricon Year-End Chart	38

== See also ==
- 1987 in Japanese music
