= Midnight Taxi (song) =

1990 single by Miho Nakayama

Single by Miho Nakayama

from the album All for You
- Language: Japanese
- B-side: "Honki Demo..."
- Released: January 15, 1990
- Recorded: 1989
- Genre: J-pop
- Length: 4:53
- Label: King Records
- Composer: Ryō Asuka
- Lyricist: Ryo Asuka

Miho Nakayama singles chronology
"Rosécolor" (1989)	"Midnight Taxi" (1990)	"Semi-sweet Magic" (1990)

"Midnight Taxi" (ミッドナイト・タクシー, Middonaito Takushī) is the 17th single by Japanese entertainer Miho Nakayama. Written by Ryō Asuka, the single was released on January 15, 1990, by King Records.

== Background and release ==
"Midnight Taxi" was Nakayama's final single to be released on 7" vinyl EP format. It was released to coincide with her Coming of Age Day.

"Midnight Taxi" became Nakayama's sixth No. 1 on Oricon's weekly singles chart. It sold over 181,000 copies and was certified Gold by the RIAJ.

== Track listing ==
All songs are written by Ryō Asuka and arranged by Tomoji Sogawa.

7" single
No.	Title	Length
1.	"Midnight Taxi"	4:53
2.	"Honki Demo..." ((本気でも…; "Seriously..."))	5:10

== Charts ==
Weekly charts

Chart (1990)	Peak position
Oricon Weekly Singles Chart	1
Uta no Top Ten	2

Year-end charts

Chart (1990)	Peak position
Oricon Year-End Chart	63

== Certification ==
Region	Certification	Certified units/sales
Japan (RIAJ)	Gold	200,000^{^}
^{^} Shipments figures based on certification alone.

== See also ==
- 1990 in Japanese music
