= You're My Only Shinin' Star =

1988 single by Miho Nakayama

Single by Miho Nakayama

from the album Ballads
- Language: Japanese
- B-side: "Sherry"
- Released: February 17, 1988
- Recorded: 1987
- Genre: J-pop
- Length: 4:43
- Label: King Records
- Songwriter: Toshiki Kadomatsu
- Producer: Toshiki Kadomatsu

Miho Nakayama singles chronology
"Catch Me" (1987)	"You're My Only Shinin' Star" (1988)	"Mermaid" (1988)

Audio sample
- "You're My Only Shinin' Star": file; help

"You're My Only Shinin' Star" is a song recorded by Japanese entertainer Miho Nakayama, from her third studio album Summer Breeze (1986). It was re-recorded two years later and released as her 10th single by King Records on February 17, 1988; this version was included in her 1989 compilation album Ballads. The album version of the song is featured on the TBS drama series Mama wa Idol (ママはアイドル, 1987), starring Nakayama herself. "You're My Only Shinin' Star" was one of the fifteen recipients of the Gold Prize at the 30th Japan Record Awards and was nominated for the Japan Record Award.

== Background ==
"You're My Only Shinin' Star" was written and produced by Toshiki Kadomatsu. The song is composed in the key of C sharp minor and set to a tempo of 70 beats per minute. Nakayama's vocals span from A_{3} to B_{4}. The song was first included as the last track of Nakayama's album Summer Breeze (1986). Due to strong fan demand and Nakayama's fondness for the song, it was re-recorded two years later and released as a single in February 1988. In an interview with JASRAC, Kadomatsu revealed he wrote the song on an off day while in New York for recording sessions. It took him 15 minutes to come up with the melody for the song, and within an hour he had completed the lyrics. "You're My Only Shinin' Star" is one of four songs Kadomatsu contributed to Summer Breeze and according to him it is the most 'straightforward' record he wrote for Nakayama's album.

Nakayama re-recorded the song on her 1989 album Hide 'n' Seek, her 1991 compilation Miho's Select, her 1993 compilation Blanket Privacy, and her 2019 album Neuf Neuf.

== Chart performance ==
"You're My Only Shinin' Star" became Nakayama's second No. 1 on Oricon's weekly singles chart. It dropped to number 5 the following week, then down to number 9. It fell off the top ten for a week on its fourth charting week, and climbed back up to number 7 the following week. The song spent two weeks at number 11, and slid back into the top ten the following week at number 10. The single charted in the top 50 for 18 weeks and sold a reported total of 293,000 copies. "You're My Only Shinin' Star" was the sixth best-selling single for March 1988 and ranked at number 15 on the year-end Oricon Singles Chart.

== Track listing ==
All tracks are written by Toshiki Kadomatsu.

No.	Title	Arrangement	Length
1.	"You're My Only Shinin' Star"	Kadomatsu; Kazuo Ōtani (strings); Shin Kazuhara (brass)	4:43
2.	"Sherry"	Kadomatsu	4:40

== Charts ==
Chart (1988)	Peak position
Japan Weekly Singles (Oricon)	1
Japan Monthly Singles (Oricon)	6
Japan Yearly Singles (Oricon)	15

== Sales ==
Region	Certification	Certified units/sales
Japan	—	293,000

== Release history ==
Region	Date	Format(s)	Label	Ref.
Japan	February 17, 1988	Vinyl; cassette	King Records	
Japan	February 5, 1989	8cm CD	King Records	
Japan	October 1, 2012	Digital download	King Records	

== Toshiki Kadomatsu version ==
"You're My Only Shinin' Star"

Single by Toshiki Kadomatsu

from the album The Gentle Sex
- Language: Japanese
- Released: November 25, 1999
- Recorded: 1999
- Genre: J-pop
- Length: 5:34
- Label: BMG Funhouse
- Songwriter: Toshiki Kadomatsu
- Producer: Toshiki Kadomatsu

Toshiki Kadomatsu singles chronology
"Unforgettable" (1998)	"You're My Only Shinin' Star" (1999)	"Ai to Shura" (2000)

In 1999, Kadomatsu recorded a self-cover of "You're My Only Shinin' Star" for his first self-covers album The Gentle Sex (2000). It was released as the album's lead single by BMG Funhouse on November 25, 1988. Kadomatsu had once covered the song in English for the album Tears Ballads (1991), but had not sung the original Japanese version until deciding to release The Gentle Sex, for which he recorded songs he had previously written for female artists. In 2007, Kadomatsu covered the song again for the compilation Players Presents Toshiki Kadomatsu Ballad Collection, where the included version was produced by Shingo Kobayashi. The woman depicted on the cover artwork for the single is actually Kadomatsu himself in drag.

Kadomatsu's version of "You're My Only Shinin' Star" debuted at number 27 on the Oricon Singles Chart, with 19,140 copies sold on the first week. It charted in the top 100 for five weeks and sold a reported total of 40,000 copies.

=== Track listing ===
All tracks are written and arranged by Toshiki Kadomatsu, except where indicated.

No.	Title	Lyrics	Length
1.	"You're My Only Shinin' Star"		5:34
2.	"Kabin (Hangover Take with Piano)" ((花瓶〜hangover take with piano〜; "Vase ~Hangover Take with Piano~"))		7:10
3.	"You're My Only Shinin' Star" (English Version)	Kadomatsu; Antonio Teranishi	5:47
4.	"Kimi to Iu na no Boku ni Oshietai (Introduction)" ((君という名の僕におしえたい〜Introduction〜; "I Want to Tell You My Name ~Introduction~"))		1:30
5.	"You're My Only Shinin' Star" (Instrumental)		5:31
Total length:			25:32

=== Charts ===
Chart (1999)	Peak position
Japan Weekly Singles (Oricon)	27

=== Sales ===
Region	Certification	Certified units/sales
Japan	—	40,000

== Other cover versions ==
In 1998, Mami Kingetsu covered the song for the album Tokimeki Memorial: Nijiiro no Seishun Forever Vol. 3 In 2004, American singer Jessica Sheely recorded an English-language cover of the song for the album Kadomatsu T's Song from L.A: The Ballad Covers Collection. In 2007, Chiaki Takahashi recorded a cover of the song for the album The Idolm@ster: Your Song. In 2008, Azu covered the song for her debut album As One. The same year, Thelma Aoyama covered the song and included it as a B-side to her single "Daikkirai Demo Arigato". In 2012, Che'Nelle recorded an English cover of the song for her third studio album, Believe. In 2013, Guitar☆Man GPK recorded a cover of the song, featuring Izumi Kato on vocals, for the album King of Pops. In 2014, Tomomi Kahara covered the song for her covers album Memories: Kahara Covers. In 2016, Takeshi Tsuruno covered the song for his covers album Tsuruno Uta 3.5. Ai Furihata covered the song on her 2022 cover album Memories of Romance in Summer.

== See also ==
- List of Oricon number-one singles
- 1988 in Japanese music
