= Toshiki Kadomatsu =

Musical artist (born 1960)

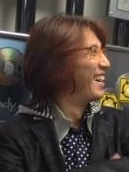
- Born: Kadomatsu Toshiki (角松 敏生); 12 August 1960 (age 66); Yoyogi, Shibuya, Tokyo, Japan
- Occupations: Singer; songwriter; record producer
- Musical career
- Genres: Funk; fusion; rock; R&B; city pop
- Instruments: Vocals; guitar
- Years active: 1981–present
- Labels: SME; RCA; Air Records; BMG Victor Inc.; Om; Ideak; BMG; Ariola; Avex Ideak; (Note: As producer only.)
- Website: toshiki-kadomatsu.jp

Toshiki Kadomatsu (角松 敏生, Kadomatsu Toshiki; born 12 August 1960) is a Japanese singer-songwriter, musician, and producer best known as one of the pioneers of the city pop genre. He has released many studio albums, as well as several instrumental and live albums. He has been active since 1981.

== Biography ==
Kadomatsu began playing music at around grade 4 or 5, after seeing his older brother playing guitar and wanting to try it himself. Kadomatsu studied philosophy at Nihon University, where he participated in the university's music club. While still studying, he debuted as a musical artist in 1981 with single "Yokohama Twilight Time" and the album Sea Breeze. In 1987, he released the hit instrumental album Sea Is a Lady which charted at No. 4. From 1993-1998, he went on a hiatus from releasing music and touring, instead focusing on producing and songwriting for other Japanese artists. Despite his hiatus he returned with a successful comeback tour in 1999 and has been engaged in artist activities since. He holds an anniversary concert every five years.

Kadomatsu has also produced other artists. Many were sent to No. 1 on the Oricon weekly chart, including: Anri's album Timely!!, Miho Nakayama's album Catch the Nite and the single "You're My Only Shinin' Star," which was fully produced by Kadomatsu.

On 11 March 2022, Kadomatsu participated in the Shuichi "Ponta" Murakami tribute concert "One Last Live", performing "Sea Line", "Ramp In", and "Yokohama Twilight Time".

== Discography ==
=== Studio albums ===
Year	Album name	Label
1981	Sea Breeze	RCA
1982	Weekend Fly to the Sun	RCA
1983	On the City Shore	Air
1984	After 5 Clash	Air
1985	Gold Digger: With True Love	Air
1986	Touch And Go	Air
1987	Sea Is a Lady (Instrumental album)	Air
1988	Before the Daylight: Is the Most Darkness Moment in a Day	BMG Victor Inc.
1989	Reasons for Thousand Lovers	Om
1989	More Desire (Live album)	Om
1990	Legacy of You (Instrumental album)	Om
1991	All Is Vanity	Om
1992	あるがままに ("You And Me")	Om
1992	君をこえる日 ("I'll Be Over You")	Om
1999	Time Tunnel	Sony BMG
1999	Voices Under the Water/In the Hall (Live album)	Sony BMG
2000	Antinomy	Sony BMG
2000	The Gentle Sex (Cover album)	Sony BMG
2002	Incarnatio	Sony BMG
2002	Shiroi-fune (Film soundtrack)	Sony BMG
2003	Summer 4 Rhythm	Sony BMG
2004	Fankacoustics	Sony BMG
2005	The Past & Then (Cover album)	Sony BMG
2005	Miracle Banana (Film soundtrack)	Sony BMG
2006	Prayer	Sony BMG
2009	No Turns	Sony BMG
2010	Citylights Dandy	Ariola
2012	Rebirth 1 〜Re-make Best〜	Ariola
2014	The Moment	Ariola
2016	Sea Breeze 2016 (Cover album)	Ariola
2017	Sea Is a Lady 2017(Cover album)	Ariola
2018	Breath From The Season 2018 〜Tribute to Tokyo Ensemble Lab〜 (Cover album)	Ariola
2019	東京少年少女 ("Tokyo Boys & Girls") (EP)	Ariola
2020	Earplay -Rebirth 2- (Cover album)	Ariola
2022	MILAD #1 (EP)	Ariola
2022	MILAD #2 (EP)	Ariola
2022	Inherit the Life	Ariola
2023	Inherit the Life II	Ariola
2024	Magic Hour 〜Lovers At Dusk〜	Ariola
2024	Tiny Scandal (Instrumental album)	Ariola
2025	Forgotten Shores	Ariola

=== Compilations ===
Year	Album name	Label
1984	Summer Time Romance ~ From Kiki	Air
1985	T's Ballad	Air
1986	T's 12 Inches	Air
1991	Tears Ballad	Air
1993	1981–1987	Ariola
2000	1988–1993	Ariola
2011	1998–2010	Ariola
2020	Toshiki Kadomatsu Works -Good Digger-	GT Music

=== Singles ===
Year	A-Side	B-Side(s)	Album _{*A/B} _{**only for the first appearance}
1981	"Yokohama Twilight Time"	"Summer Moments"	Sea Breeze / 1981–1987_{*retake}
1982	"Friday To Sunday"	"I'll Call You"	Weekend Fly To The Sun / 1981–1987_{*retake}
1983	"Take You To The Sky High"	"Lonely Goofey"	On The City Shore / 1981–1987_{*retake}
1983	"Do You Wanna Dance"^{*12inch}	"It's Hard To Say Goodbye", "Fly by Day"	T's 12 Inches_{*remix} / T's Ballad_{*only CD} / Not included in the album
1984	"Heart Dancing"	"Midnight Girl"	After 5 Clash_{(both)}
1984	"Girl in the Box"	"Get Down"	1981–1987_{(both)*7inch original single version}
1984	"Girl in the Box"	"Step Into The Light"	T's 12 Inches_{(both)*12inch version}
1985	"Tokyo Tower"	"Secret Lover"	Gold Digger~with true love~_{(both) *album version}
1985	"No End Summer"	"You're Not My Girl"	Gold Digger~with true love~ _{*album version} / 1981–1987_{*retake}
1985	"初恋 (Hatsu Koi)"	"Snow Lady Fantasy"	Non-album single_{(both)} _{*7inch original single version} / T's 12 Inches_{(both)} _{*12inch version}
1986	"The Best of Love"	"You're Not My Girl (Powerful Remix)"	Touch And Go_{*album version} / 1981–1987_{*retake}
1986	"Lucky Lady Feel So Good"^{*12 inch}	"Take Off Melody"^{*12inch}	T's 12 Inches_{(both)}
1986	"Pile Driver"^{*12inch}	—	T's 12 Inches_{(both)}
1986	"ドアの向こう ~ Sayonara T"	"We Can Dance"	1981–1987_{(both)}
1987	"This is My Truth ~ Shinin' Star"	"June Bride"	1981–1987 / Tears Ballad_{*retake}
1987	"Sea Line"	—	Sea Is A Lady_{*album version}
1987	"She's My Lady"	"She's My Lady (Extended Power Drum Mix)"	1981–1987 / Not included in the album
1988	"I Can Give You My Love"	"Lost My Heart in the Dark"	Before the Daylight is the most darkness in a day_{(both)} _{*7inch} / Voices from the Daylight〜Gold 12inch items_{(both) *12inch}
1988	"Can't You See"	"Remember You"	Before the Daylight is the most darkness in a day_{(both)} _{*7inch} / Voices from the Daylight〜Gold 12inch items_{(both) *12inch}
1988	"もう一度 (Mou Ichido)･･･and then"	"花瓶 (Kabin)"	Non-album single / Tears Ballad_{*remix}
1989	"Okinawa"	"Rockin' Out My Love"	Reasons for Thousand Lovers _{*album version} / 1988–1993
1990	"I Must Change My Life & Love For Me"	—	1988–1993
1990	"Parasail"	—	Legacy of You _{*album version}
1991	"Galaxy Girl"	—	1988–1993
1991	"この駅から... (Kono Eki Kara...)"	"Pink Moon"	All Is Vanity _{*album version} / Not included in the album
1991	"サンタが泣いた日 (Santa Ga Naita Hi)"	"Desire"	Tears Ballad_{(both)}
1992	"The Lost Love"	"The Best Of Love (Live Version)"	Tears Ballad / Not included in the album
1992	"夜をこえて (Yoru Wo Koete)"	"ハミルトンの夏休み (Hamiruton No Natsuyasumi)" (instrumental)	あるがままに (Arugamamani) / Not included in the album
1992	"君を二度とはなさない (Kimi Wo Nido To Hanasanai)"	—	あるがままに (Arugamamani)
1992	"君たちへ...~BONとYUKARIのBALLAD~ (Kimi Tachi E...~BON To YUKARI No BALLAD~)"	—	君をこえる日 (Kimi Wo Koeru Hi)
1998	"Realize"	"Splendid Love"	Time Tunnel / Not included in the album
1998	"Unforgettable"	—	Time Tunnel_{*secret track}
1999	"You're My Only Shinin' Star"	"花瓶 〜hangover take with piano〜", "You're My Only Shinin' Star 〜English Version〜", "君という名の僕におしえたい 〜Introduction〜"	The Gentle Sex_{(all except two latter)}
2000	"愛と修羅 (Ai To Shura)"	"Up Town Girl in Yurakucho" (Up Town Girl Live Version&Studio Mix), —	存在の証明 (Sonzai No Shomei) Antinomy / Not included in the album
2001	"心配 (Shinpai)"	"Yokohama Twilight Time" (20th Anniversary Version)	1998–2010 / Not included in the album
2002	"Always Be With You"	—	Incarnatio
2003	"君のためにできること (Kimi No Tame Ni Dekiru Koto)"	"Last Flight", —	Summer 4 Rhythm_{(both) *album version}
2004	"Startin'"	"月のように星のように (Tsuki No Youni Hoshi No Youni)", —	1998-2010_{(both)}
2006	"Smile" (with Chiaki)	"青い水から (Aoi Mizu Kara)", —	Prayer / Not included in the album
2010	"134" ^{*Digital Only}	—	Citylights Dandy _{*album version}
2010	"Mrs.Moonlight" ^{*Digital Only}	—	Citylights Dandy _{*album version}
2011	"Do You Wanna Dance", "Tokyo Tower", "A Widow On the Shore", "Wave", "After 5 Crash"	—	Rebirth 1~Re-make Best~ _{*Digital Only}
2014	"I See The Light〜輝く未来〜 (Kagayaku Mirai) feat.RINA" _{(cover)}	"I See The Light〜輝く未来〜 (Kagayaku Mirai) feat.MAO" _{(cover)}	The Moment _{*Digital Only}
2023	"Go & See My Love T-Remix"^{*Digital Only}	—	Inherit the Life II
2023	"After 5 Crash〜Tokyo Tower〜初恋 (After 5 Crash〜Tokyo Tower〜Hatsukoi)" _{(cover)^{*Digital Only}}	—	Inherit the Life II

=== Other appearances ===
Year	Artist Name	Album title	Role(s)	Label
1982	Anri	Heaven Beach	Lyrics, music	For Life
1983	Anri	Bi・Ki・Ni	Lyrics, music, arrangements, guitar	For Life
1983	Anri	Timely!!	Producer, lyrics, music, arrangements, guitar, chorus	For Life
1984	Anri	Coool	Producer, arrangements, lyrics, music, guitar	For Life
1984	Jackie Chan	Love Me	Lyrics, music, arrangements, guitar, background vocals	Warner-Pioneer
1985	Anri	Wave	Arrangements, vocal arrangements, electric guitar, percussion	For Life
1985	Hideki Saijo	Twilight Made...	Electric guitar, music, arrangements	RCA
1985	Akina Nakamori	Bitter and Sweet	Composer, lyrics, arrangements	Warner-Pioneer
1986	Miho Nakayama	Summer Breeze	Lyrics, music, arrangements	King
1986	Fu Chuen	十個夢 (Ten Dreams)	Music	Himalaya
1986	Kojiro Shimizu	Cool Fantasy	Composer, arrangements	Warner-Pioneer
1986	李珊珊 (Li Shanshan)	李珊珊 (Li Shanshan)	Songwriter	Rising Sun
1986	Jadoes	It's Friday	Producer, guitar, chorus, turntable, lyrics, music, arrangements	Nippon Columbia
1987	Jadoes	Free Drink	Producer, guitar, chorus, rhythm programming, arrangements, vocal arrangements, lyrics	Nippon Columbia
1987	Jadoes	Before the Best	Producer	Nippon Columbia
1987	Anri	Meditation	Composer, arrangements, words	For Life
1988	Jadoes	A Lie	Producer, guitar, chorus, programming, lyrics, arrangements, vocal arrangements	Nippon Columbia
1988	Hiroshi Satoh	Aqua	Music, synthesizer, bass synth, rhythm programming	Alfa
1988	Tokyo Ensemble Lab	Breath From the Season	Producer, songwriter	BMG Victor Inc.
1988	Miho Nakayama	Catch the Nite	Producer, songwriter	King
1989	Miho Nakayama	Hide 'n' Seek	Lyrics, music	King
1989	Jadoes	Dumpo	Executive producer, arrangements, guitar, programming, scratches, chorus	Nippon Columbia
1989	Tomohito Aoki	Double Face	Co-producer	BMG Victor Inc.
1989	Nobu Caine	Nobu Caine	Producer, arranger and playing various instruments	BMG Victor Inc.
1990	Nobu Caine	Nobu Caine 2	Producer, vocals	BMG Victor Inc.
1990	Yuko Imai	Do Away	Producer, songwriter, arranger and playing various instruments	King
1990	Yurie Kokubu	Silent Moon	Lyrics, music	Air
1991	Gedo	One, Two	Producer, chorus, programming	Meldac
1992	空と海と風と...	泣くんじゃない	Producer, arrangements, keyboards, programming, background vocals	BMG Victor Inc.
1993	Yoshihiro Tomonari	Natural Sign	Producer, songwriting, arrangements, vocal arrangements, background vocals, guest, keyboards, programming, guitar	BMG Victor Inc.
1994	空と海と風と...	空と海と風と...2	Producer, arrangements, keyboards, programming, background vocals	BMG Victor Inc.
1994	Miho Yonemitsu	From My Heart	Producer	Epic
1995	Miho Yonemitsu	Forever	Producer	Epic
1995	Anri	Opus 21	Lyrics, music	For Life
1995	Agharta	Agharta 1	Producer, lyrics, music, vocals, guitar, keyboards, programming	On Air/JIK
1995	Agharta	Agharta 2	Producer, lyrics, music, vocals, guitar, keyboards, programming	On Air/JIK
1996	Agharta	Agharta	Vocals, guitar, keyboards, programming	Ideak
1996	Jimsaku	Dispenstation	Producer	BMG Victor Inc.
1996	Konta	Jane Doe	Arranger, producer, keyboards, backing vocals, programming, music	Speedstar
1996	Akira Fuse	Estimado	Producer, arranger	Ideak
1996	Takahiro Nakatani	Lifesize	Producer	BMG Victor Inc.
1996	Vocaland	Vocaland	Producer	Avex Ideak
1997	Vocaland	Vocaland 2~Male, Female & Mellow~	Producer	Avex Ideak
1997	Anna	Anna	Producer, arrangements	Pony Canyon
1999	Agharta	Revenge of Agharta	Vocals, guitar, keyboards, programming	Ideak
2000	Tomohito Aoki	Experience	Acoustic and electric guitar, backing vocals, programming, keyboards, producer, arranger	Victor
2003	Anri	R134 Ocean Delights	Feature, lyrics, music, background vocals, arrangements, guitar	For Life
2010	Ordinary Child	Desert Butterfly	Producer	Geedes
2010	Chiaki	Chiaki	Producer	
2011	Takamasa Segi	Wildlife	Feature	for the future of WILDLIFE
2015	May's	Traveling	Guest	Nippon Crown
2017	Jazzyfact	Waves Like	Lyrics, producer	Illionaire
2018	Yuko Imai	It's My Time to Shine	Electric guitar, composer, music, arrangements, programming	King
2019	Yoko Hamasaki	Blind Love	Producer	Universal
2019	Suzue	Hometown of the Heart ~Songs of Japan~	Producer	
2026	Akira Jimbo	34/45	Feature	King Records
