= Anri =

Japanese singer

- 杏里
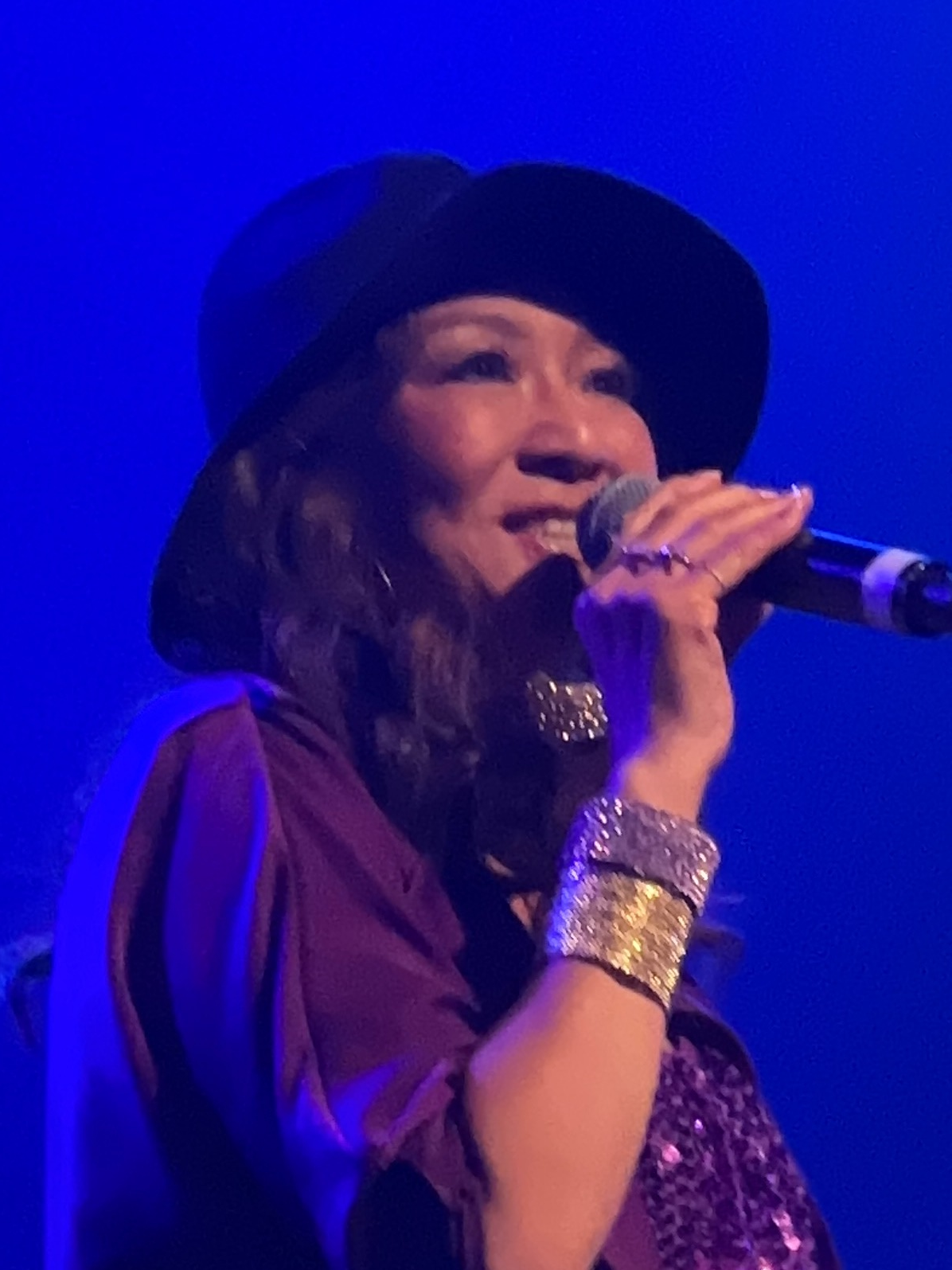
- Anri performing in 2023
- Born: Kawashima Eiko (川島 栄子); 31 August 1961 (age 64); Yamato, Kanagawa Prefecture, Japan
- Occupations: Singer; songwriter
- Musical career
- Genres: Jazz; R&B; J-pop; city pop
- Instrument: Vocals
- Years active: 1978–present
- Website: anri-music.com

YouTube information
- Channel: ANRI 杏里 Official
- Years active: 2015–present
- Subscribers: 187 thousand
- Views: 229 million

Eiko Kawashima (川島 栄子, Kawashima Eiko; born 31 August 1961), better known as Anri (杏里), is a Japanese pop singer from Yamato, Kanagawa Prefecture. In a career spanning more than 40 years, she achieved commercial success and popularity in the city pop music scene during the 1980s.

== Career ==
Anri's debut release was 1978's "Oribia o Kikinagara" ("While Listening to Olivia"), written by Amii Ozaki.

She achieved commercial success and popularity with her signature classic 1983 release, Timely!!, which spawned the hits "Cat's Eye" and "Kanashimi ga Tomaranai" ("I Can't Stop the Loneliness"). "Cat's Eye" was used as the first opening theme of the eponymous 1983 anime series of the same name and debuted as No. 1 on Countdown Japan. It spent 4 weeks at No. 1 on the Oricon chart. It was one of the first J-pop songs used for an anime theme song. In 2017, she performed the song live at the opening of the touring ice show Fantasy on Ice amongst others. She appeared at the Red and White New Year's Music Special at the end of that same year, performing "Cat's Eye".

Other hit songs include: "Summer Candles" and "Dolphin Ring", both of which became standard songs played at Japanese weddings and receptions. Throughout the 1980s and early 1990s, Anri's albums were bestsellers. She has had highly successful tours—one with an attendance of almost 100,000—and toured Hawaii for the first time in 1987. She sang Furusato, a folklore song, during the 1998 Winter Olympics closing ceremonies . In 2002, she began collaborating with jazz fusion guitarist Lee Ritenour, who produced her 2002 LP Smooth Jam – Quiet Storm. In 2021, Anri collaborated with Mariya Takeuchi on the single "Watching Over You" under the name "Peach & Apricot".

With the renewed popularity of city pop, and her songs having been sampled by many new artists of the vaporwave and future funk genres, Anri has enjoyed new success and popularity outside of Japan. Following her rediscovery, several of her albums were reissued in 2023.

== Personal life ==
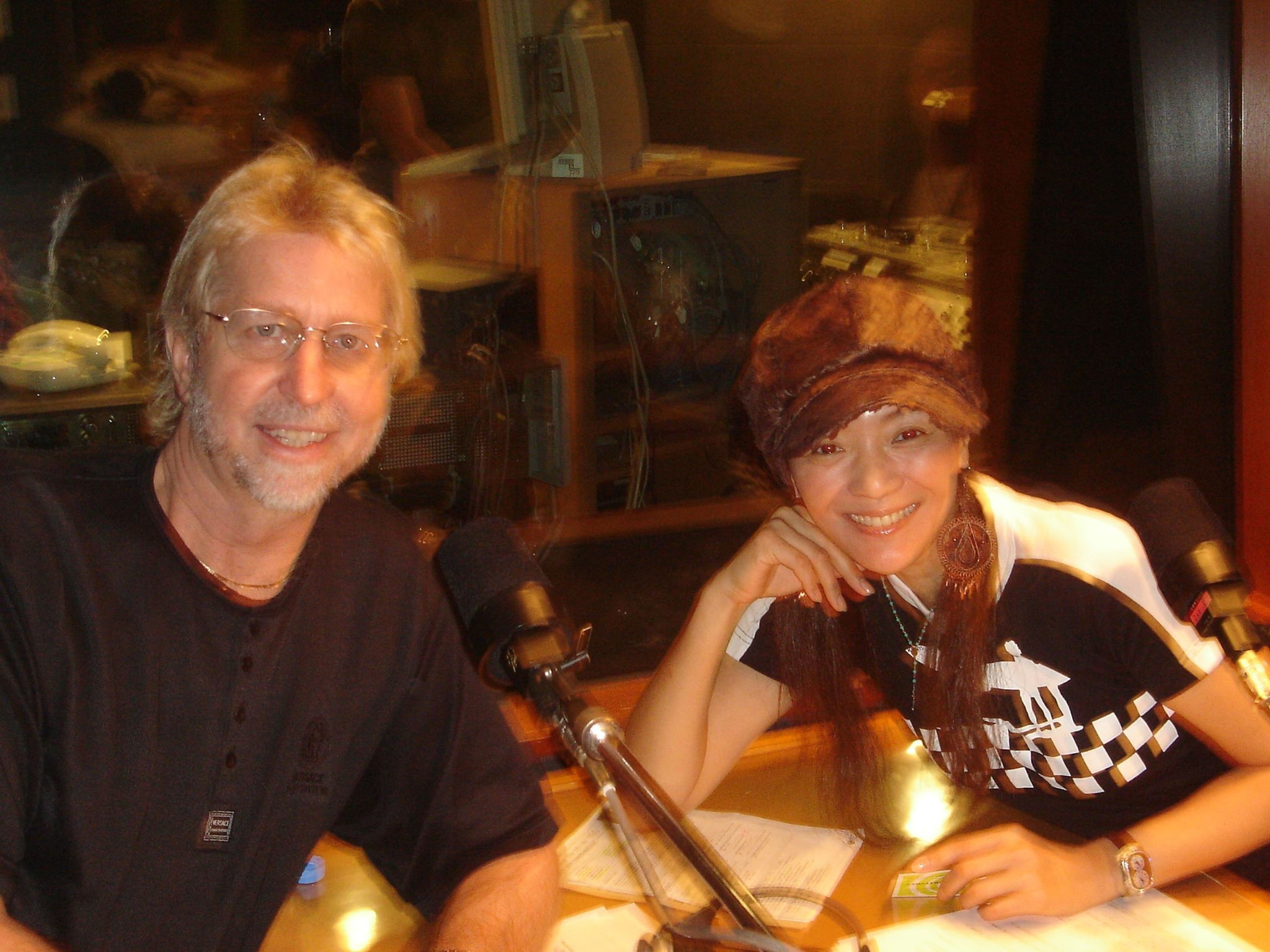
Anri with Kamasami Kong at FM Cocolo.

Anri lives in Los Angeles, California.

== Discography ==
=== Studio albums ===
List of albums, with selected chart positions
Title	Details	Peak positions
Title	Details	JPN Oricon
Anri: Apricot Jam (杏里 Apricot Jam)	Released: 1978; Label: For Life; Formats: CD, LP, Cassette tape, digital download, streaming	51
Feelin'	Released: 1979; Label: For Life; Formats: CD, LP, Cassette tape, digital download, streaming	71
Kanashimi no Kujaku (哀しみの孔雀, Sad Peacock)	Released: 1981; Label: For Life; Formats: CD, LP, Cassette tape, digital download, streaming	-
Heaven Beach	Released: 1982; Label: For Life; Formats: CD, LP, Cassette tape, digital download, streaming	89
Bi・Ki・Ni	Released: 1983; Label: For Life; Formats: CD, LP, Cassette tape, digital download, streaming	27
Timely!!	Released: 1983; Label: For Life; Formats: CD, LP, Cassette tape, digital download, streaming	1
Coool	Released: 1984; Label: For Life; Formats: CD, LP, Cassette tape, digital download, streaming	5
Wave	Released: 1985; Label: For Life; Formats: CD, LP, Cassette tape, digital download, streaming	5
Mystique	Released: 1986; Label: For Life; Formats: CD, LP, Cassette tape, digital download, streaming	6
Trouble in Paradise	Released: 1986; Label: For Life; Formats: CD, LP, Cassette tape, digital download, streaming	9
Summer Farewells	Released: 1987; Label: For Life; Formats: CD, LP, Cassette tape, digital download, streaming	4
Boogie Woogie Mainland	Released: 1988; Label: For Life; Formats: CD, LP, Cassette tape, digital download, streaming	2
Circuit of Rainbow	Released: 1990; Label: For Life; Formats: CD, Cassette tape, digital download, streaming	1
Mind Cruisin'	Released: 1990; Label: For Life; Formats: CD, Cassette tape, digital download, streaming	1
Neutral	Released: 1991; Label: For Life; Formats: CD, Cassette tape, digital download, streaming	2
Moana Lani	Released: 1992; Label: For Life; Formats: CD, digital download, streaming	3
Angel Whisper	Released: 1996; Label: For Life; Formats: CD, digital download, streaming	4
Twin Soul	Released: 1997; Label: For Life; Formats: CD, digital download, streaming	9
Moonlit Summer Tales	Released: 1998; Label: For Life; Formats: CD, digital download, streaming	5
Ever Blue	Released: 1999; Label: For Life; Formats: CD, digital download, streaming	24
The Beach House	Released: 2000; Label: For Life; Formats: CD, digital download, streaming	20
My Music	Released: 2001; Label: Dolphin Hearts; Formats: CD, digital download, streaming	48
Sol	Released: 2005; Label: Nippon Columbia; Formats: CD, digital download, streaming	192
Smooth & Groove	Released: 2015; Label: IVY Records; Formats: CD, digital download, streaming	52
Anri	Released: 2018; Label: IVY Records; Formats: CD, digital download, streaming	38

=== Cover albums ===
List of albums, with selected chart positions
Title	Details	Peak positions
Title	Details	JPN Oricon
Smooth Jam: Aspasia	Released: 2002; Label: Nippon Crown; Formats: CD, digital download, streaming	-
Smooth Jam: Quiet Storm	Released: 2002; Label: Nippon Crown; Formats: CD, digital download, streaming	-
Tears of Anri	Released: 2007; Label: Universal Music Japan; Formats: CD, digital download, streaming	25
Tears of Anri II	Released: 2008; Label: Universal Music Japan; Formats: CD, digital download, streaming	30

==== Self-cover albums ====
List of albums, with selected chart positions
Title	Details	Peak positions
Title	Details	JPN Oricon
Anri Again – Best of Myself	Released: 2009; Label: Universal Music Japan; Formats: CD, digital download, streaming	44
Surf City -Coool Breeze-	Released: 2013; Label: IVY Records; Formats: CD, digital download, streaming	19
Surf & Tears	Released: 2014; Label: IVY Records; Formats: CD, digital download, streaming	—

=== Live albums ===
List of albums, with selected chart positions
Title	Album details	Peak positions
Title	Album details	JPN Oricon
Fun Time	Released: 2017; Label: Ivy Records; Formats: CD, digital download, streaming	84

=== Compilation albums ===
List of albums, with selected chart positions
Title	Details	Peak positions
Title	Details	JPN Oricon
Anri the Best	Released: 1980; Label: For Life; Formats: CD, LP, Cassette tape, digital download, streaming	-
Anri: The Best (杏里 ザ・ベスト)	Released: 1980; Label: For Life; Formats: CD, LP, Cassette tape, digital download, streaming	-
Omoikiri American ~ I Love Popping World, Anri ~ (思いきりアメリカン 〜I Love Poping World, Anri〜)	Released: 1982; Label: For Life; Formats: CD, LP, Cassette tape, digital download, streaming	43
The Anri (ザ・杏里)	Released: 1986; Label: For Life; Formats: CD, LP, Cassette tape, digital download, streaming	13
Meditation	Released: 1987; Label: For Life; Formats: CD, LP, Cassette tape, digital download, streaming	3
My Favorite Songs	Released: 1988; Label: For Life; Formats: CD, LP, Cassette tape, digital download, streaming	8
My Favorite Songs 2	Released: 1991; Label: For Life; Formats: CD, Cassette tape, digital download, streaming	2
16th Summer Breeze	Released: 1994; Label: For Life; Formats: CD, digital download, streaming	1
Opus 21	Released: 1995; Label: For Life; Formats: CD, digital download, streaming	1
Anri the Best	Released: 2000; Label: For Life; Formats: CD, digital download, streaming	8
R134 Ocean Delights	Released: 2003; Label: For Life; Formats: CD, digital download, streaming	34
a day in the summer The Best from "16th Summer Breeze" and "OPUS 21"	Released: 2007; Label: For Life; Formats: CD, digital download, streaming	—
Heart to Heart 〜with you〜	Released: 2011; Label: Warner Music Japan; Formats: CD, digital download, streaming	50
Melodies: Smooth & Groove	Released: 2016; Label: Warner Music Japan; Formats: CD, digital download, streaming	71
Anri Voice to Voice	Released: 2021; Label: Disc Union; Formats: LP	—
Anri the Best Blue	Released: July 2, 2025; Label: For Life; Formats: CD, digital download, streaming	30

=== Box sets ===
List of box sets, with selected chart positions
Title	Details
Anri in the Box	Released: 2020; Label: For Life; Formats: 22-CDs
Coool / Timely	Released: 2023; Label: For Life; Formats: 2CDs
Heaven Beach / Bi・Ki・Ni	Released: 2023; Label: For Life; Formats: 2CDs

=== Singles ===
List of singles, with selected chart positions
Year	Single	Peak chart positions	Label	Formats
Year	Single	JPN Physical	Label	Formats
1978	"Olivia wo Kikinagara" （オリビアを聴きながら）	65	For Life Records	CD, LP, Cassette, digital download, streaming
1979	"Chichuukai Dream" （地中海ドリーム）	86	For Life Records	CD, LP, Cassette, digital download, streaming
1979	"Namida wo Umi ni Kaeshitai" （涙を海に返したい）	-	For Life Records	CD, LP, Cassette, digital download, streaming
1979	"Inspiration" （インスピレーション）	-	For Life Records	CD, LP, Cassette, digital download, streaming
1980	"Kaze no Jealousy" （風のジェラシー）	-	For Life Records	CD, LP, Cassette, digital download, streaming
1980	"Kawaii Boring" （可愛いポーリン）	-	For Life Records	CD, LP, Cassette, digital download, streaming
1981	"Cotton Kibun" （コットン気分）	-	For Life Records	CD, LP, Cassette, digital download, streaming
1981	"Ikoku no Dekigoto" （異国の出来事）	-	For Life Records	CD, LP, Cassette, digital download, streaming
1982	"Espresso de Nerenai" （エスプレッソで眠れない）	-	For Life Records	CD, LP, Cassette, digital download, streaming
1982	"Omoikiri American" （思いきりアメリカン）	74	For Life Records	CD, LP, Cassette, digital download, streaming
1982	"Fly by day"	-	For Life Records	CD, LP, Cassette, digital download, streaming
1983	"Lady Sunshine"	-	For Life Records	CD, LP, Cassette, digital download, streaming
1983	"Cat's Eye"	1	For Life Records	CD, LP, Cassette, digital download, streaming
1983	"Kanashimi ga Tomaranai" （悲しみがとまらない）	4	For Life Records	CD, LP, Cassette, digital download, streaming
1984	"Kimama ni Reflection" （気ままにREFLECTION）	7	For Life Records	CD, LP, Cassette, digital download, streaming
1985	"16(Sixteen)Beat"	31	For Life Records	CD, LP, Cassette, digital download, streaming
1986	"Oriental Rose" （オリエンタル・ローズ）	39	For Life Records	CD, LP, Cassette, digital download, streaming
1986	"Morning Squall" （モーニング スコール）	51	For Life Records	CD, LP, Cassette, digital download, streaming
1986	"Trouble in Paradise"	-	For Life Records	CD, LP, Cassette, digital download, streaming
1987	"Happy end de Furaretai" （HAPPYENDでふられたい）	17	For Life Records	CD, LP, Cassette, digital download, streaming
1987	"Surf & Tears"	27	For Life Records	CD, LP, Cassette, digital download, streaming
1988	"Summer Candles"	16	For Life Records	CD, LP, Cassette, digital download, streaming
1988	"Snow Flake no Machikado" （スノーフレイクの街角）	12	For Life Records	CD, LP, Cassette, digital download, streaming
1991	"Sweet Emotion"	13	For Life Records	CD, digital download, streaming
1991	"Back to the basic"	43	For Life Records	CD, digital download, streaming
1991	"Uso Nara Yasashiku" （嘘ならやさしく）	14	For Life Records	CD, digital download, streaming
1991	"Last Love" （ラスト ラブ）	14	For Life Records	CD, digital download, streaming
1992	"Lani: Heavenly Garden"	18	For Life Records	CD, digital download, streaming
1993	"Dolphin Ring" （ドルフィン・リング）	9	For Life Records	CD, digital download, streaming
1994	"All of you"	27	For Life Records	CD, digital download, streaming
1994	"Share Hitomi no Naka no Hero" （SHARE 瞳の中のヒーロー）	47	For Life Records	CD, digital download, streaming
1995	"Legends of Love"	67	For Life Records	CD, digital download, streaming
1996	"Ano Natsu ni Modoritai" （あの夏に戻りたい）	50	For Life Records	CD, digital download, streaming
1996	"Mou Hitotsu no Birthday" （もうひとつのBirthday）	-	For Life Records	CD, digital download, streaming
1997	"Cat's Eye-2000"	47	For Life Records	CD, digital download, streaming
1997	"Future For You"	-	For Life Records	CD, digital download, streaming
1998	"Eternity"	85	For Life Records	CD, digital download, streaming
1998	"Natsu no Tsuki" （夏の月）	22	For Life Records	CD, digital download, streaming
1999	"Aenai Setsunasa to" （逢えないせつなさと）	-	For Life Records	CD, digital download, streaming
2001	"Sunset Beach Hotel"	100	Nippon Crown	CD, digital download, streaming
2001	"Sunset Beach Hotel"	-	Nippon Crown	CD, digital download, streaming
2004	"Return To The Silence"	-	Nippon Columbia	CD, digital download, streaming
2005	"Field of Lights"	-	Nippon Columbia	CD, digital download, streaming
2008	"Mou Kanashikunai: Anri 30th Anniversary Edition" （もう悲しくない〜anri 30th anniversary edition〜）	99	Universal Music Japan	CD, digital download, streaming

==== Digital singles ====
Year	Single	Reference
2019	"Duke's Anthem"	
2019	"Wasurerarenai Okurimono"	
2019	"Crescent Moon"	
2023	"Cat's Eye 2023"	

==== Collaboration singles ====
Year	Album	Chart positions (JP)	Label
2002	"Candle Light": with Tetsurou Oda	97	Cutting edge
2003	"Tenshi wa Hitomi wo Tojite": with Hiroyuki Amano	-	independent
2021	"Watching over you": with Mariya Takeuchi	-	Warner Music Japan
2024	"Marine Blue Memories": with Tatsuya Ishii	-	Warner Music Japan

== Videography ==
=== Live albums ===
Year	Title	Details
1984	ANRI in Concert	Released: 1984; Formats: Laserdisc; VHS
1987	Anri: Live in Budokan	Formats: Laserdisc; VHS
1988	Anri: Hiroshima Peace Concert	Formats: Laserdisc; VHS
1989	Anri: Concert in Hawaii	Formats: VHS
