= Cindy (singer) =

Japanese singer

- Born: Yamamoto Mayumi (山本 真裕美); 5 May 1958; Yokohama, Japan
- Died: 17 December 2001 (aged 43)
- Genres: City pop; J-pop
- Occupations: Singer; lyricist; composer
- Instrument: Vocals
- Labels: Kitty Records; Fun House

Mayumi Yamamoto (山本 真裕美, Yamamoto Mayumi; 5 May 1958 – 17 December 2001), known professionally as Cindy, was a Japanese singer, lyricist, and composer. Originally working in music journalism, she met Stevie Wonder and worked with him. She later released four albums – Love Life (1986), Angel Touch (1990), Don't Be Afraid (1991), and Surprise (1997) – and worked as a lyricist and composer for artists like Miho Nakayama. Since her death, her music has been associated with city pop and gained popularity among DJs in Japan.

== Biography ==
Mayumi Yamamoto, a native of Yokohama, was born on 5 May 1958. Her father was a Korean lyricist, and her mother was Japanese. Her stage name Cindy was her baptismal name, named after a fairy.

After graduating from Santa Maria International High School in Yokohama, she moved to the United States. She subsequently worked in music journalism, where she interviewed such musicians as Lionel Richie. She received the attention of Stevie Wonder during an interview on the job, and the two later participated in recording sessions. After returning to Japan in 1982, she performed several commercial songs and participated in the LP recording of her close friend Ann Lewis.

She sang "Chance On Love" and "Open Invitation", the theme songs of the 1981 anime adaptation of Urusei Yatsura; it was released as a single from Kitty Records in 1984. She released her debut album Love Life in 1986; Stevie Wonder worked on two of the album's songs. Her next two albums, Angel Touch and Don't Be Afraid, were released in 1990 and 1991. She also sang "Touch the Sky" as part of the collaboration album Tower of Love. Hata of Lightmellowbu said on Mikiki that Cindy's singing voice was like an "angel voice".

In addition to singing, she was a composer and lyricist, working with Miho Nakayama as well as some of her own songs; among Cindy's compositions for Nakayama were "Mermaid", "Witches" (both 1988), "Rosécolor" (1989), and "Semi-sweet Magic" (1990). She also worked with Tatsuro Yamashita as a chorus singer, including in recordings and concerts.

Cindy died on 17 December 2001 due to cancer.

In 2015, remastered CD editions of Angel Touch and Don't Be Afraid produced by Tamotsu Yoshida were released. By 2021, several of Angel Touch's songs were being widely used in the Japanese DJ scene. One of them, "Watashitachi o Shinjite ite", was included in Sony Music Japan's 2021 city pop compilation Aldelight City: A New Standard For Japanese Pop 1975-2021 and in Hitoshi Kurimoto's 2024 album compilation City Pop Groovy 90's: Girls & Boys.

== Discography ==
=== Albums ===
Title	Year	Details	Peak chart positions	Sales	Ref.
Title	Year	Details	JPN	Sales	Ref.
Love Life (stylized in all-caps)	1986	Released: 1986; Label: Kitty Records	—	—	
Angel Touch (stylized in all-caps)	1990	Released: 25 June 1990; Label: Fun House	—	—	
Don't Be Afraid (stylized in small-caps)	1991	Released: 25 August 1991; Label: Fun House	—	—	
Surprise	1997	Released: 5 February 1997; Label: Fun House	—	—	

=== Singles ===
Title	Year	Details	Peak chart positions	Sales	Ref.
Title	Year	Details	JPN	Sales	Ref.
"Chance On Love/Open Invitation"	1984	Released: 1984; Label: Kitty Records	—	—	
"Think Your Love Away/Spread The Love" (stylized in all-caps)	1986	Released: 1986; Label: Kitty Records	—	—	
"Tenshi no Kimochi/Setsunakute" (天使の気持ち/せつなくて)	1990	Released: 25 June 1990; Label: Fun House	—	—	
"Watashitachi o Shinjiteite/Surprise" (私達を信じていて/Surprise)	1990	Released: 25 September 1990; Label: Fun House	—	—	
"Special Ever Happened/Christmas Time"	1990	Released: 25 November 1990; Label: Fun House	—	—	
"Ai ga Sabishii Toki/Tell Me Why" (愛がさびしい時/TELL ME WHY)	1991	Released: 25 August 1991; Label: Fun House	—	—	
