= Wands discography =

- Studio albums: 8
- Compilation albums: 6
- Singles: 23
- Video albums: 4
- Music videos: 16

The discography of Wands, a Japanese rock band, consisting of eight studio albums, one VHS, three DVDs, two Blu-Ray Releases and Twenty-Three singles to date. All songs during the 1st - 3rd Period were composed by Show Wesugi.

== Albums ==
=== Studio albums ===
Period	Year	Title	Oricon charts	Label
1st Period	17 June 1992	Wands (ワンズ)	Weekly ranking: Number 10	TM Factory; B-Gram Records
2nd Period	17 April 1993	Toki no Tobira (時の扉)	Weekly ranking: Number 1 (4-week period); 1993 ranking: Number 2	TM Factory; B-Gram Records
2nd Period	6 October 1993	Little Bit... (リトル・ビット…)	Weekly ranking: Number 2; 1993 ranking: Number 10	TM Factory; B-Gram Records
2nd Period	24 April 1995	Piece of My Soul (ピース・オブ・マイ・ソウル)	Weekly ranking: Number 1 (2-week period); May 1995 ranking: Number 1; 1995 ranking: Number 16	B-Gram Records
3rd Period	27 October 1999	Awake (アウェイク)	Weekly ranking: Number 18	B-Gram Records
5th Period	28 October 2020	Burn the Secret (バーン・ザ・シークレット)	Weekly ranking: Number 4	D-GO
5th Period	30 August 2023	Version 5.0 (バージョン 5.0)	Weekly ranking: Number 6	D-GO
5th Period	26 March 2025	Time Stew	Weekly ranking: Number 11	D-GO

=== Compilation albums ===
Period	Release date	Title	Oricon charts	Label
2nd Period	16 March 1996	Singles Collection +6 (シングルズ・コレクション プラス・シックス)	Weekly ranking: Number 1; 1996 ranking: Number 26	B-Gram Records
3rd Period	6 November 1997	WANDS BEST ~ HISTORICAL BEST ALBUM ~ (ワンズ・ベスト ヒストリカル・ベスト・アルバム)	Weekly ranking: Number 1; 1997 ranking: Number 81	B-Gram Records
3rd Period	9 June 2000	Best of WANDS History (ベスト・オブ・ワンズ・ヒストリー)	Weekly ranking: Number 17	B-Gram Records
Various	25 August 2002	Complete of WANDS at the Being Studio (コンプリート・オブ・ワンズ・アト・ザ・ビーイング・スタジオ)	Weekly ranking: Number 47	B-Gram Records
Various	12 December 2007	Best of Best 1000 WANDS (ベスト・オブ・ベスト・サウザンズ・ワンズ)	Weekly ranking: Number 52	B-Gram Records
Various	27 May 2008	WANDS Best Hits (ワンズ・ ベスト・ヒッツ)	released in limited edition	B-Gram Records

== Singles ==
Period	Release date	Title	Music production	Coupling With	Label	Oricon charts	Album
1st Period	4 December 1991	"Sabishisa wa Aki no Iro" (寂しさは秋の色)	Lyrics: Show Wesugi; Music: Seiichirou Kuribayashi; Arrangement: Masao Akashi	STRAY CAT 寂しさは秋の色 (オリジナル・カラオケ)	TM Factory	Weekly ranking: Number 63	WANDS
1st Period	13 May 1992	"Furimuite Dakishimete" (ふりむいて抱きしめて)	Lyrics: Show Wesugi; Music: Kousuke Ohshima; Arrangement: Kousuke Ohshima	Baby Baby Baby ふりむいて抱きしめて (オリジナル・カラオケ)	TM Factory	Weekly ranking: Number 80	WANDS
1st Period	1 July 1992	"Motto Tsuyoku Dakishimetanara" (もっと強く抱きしめたなら)	Lyrics: Show Wesugi, Tsutomu Uozumi; Music: Yoshio Tatano; Arrangement: Takeshi Hayama	Listen to the Heartbeat もっと強く抱きしめたなら (オリジナル・カラオケ)	TM Factory	Weekly ranking: Number 1 (2-week period); 1992 ranking: Number 59; 1993 ranking: Number 11	Toki no Tobira
2nd Period	26 February 1993	"Toki no Tobira" (時の扉)	Lyrics: Show Wesugi; Music: Kousuke Ohshima; Arrangement: Masao Akashi	声にならないほどに愛しい 時の扉 (オリジナル・カラオケ)	TM Factory	Weekly ranking: Number 1; 1993 ranking: Number 7	Toki no Tobira
2nd Period	17 April 1993	"Ai wo Kataru Yori Guchidzuke wo Kawasou" (愛を語るより口づけをかわそう)	Lyrics: Show Wesugi; Music: Tetsurō Oda; Arrangement: Masao Akashi	…でも 君を はなさない 愛を語るより口づけをかわそう (オリジナル・カラオケ)	TM Factory	Weekly ranking: Number 1 (4-week period); May 1993 ranking: Number 1; 1993 ranking: Number 14	Little Bit…
2nd Period	7 July 1993	"Koiseyo Otome" (恋せよ乙女)	Lyrics: Show Wesugi; Music: Kousuke Ohshima; Arrangement: Takeshi Hayama	ありふれた言葉で 恋せよ乙女 (オリジナル・カラオケ)	TM Factory	Weekly ranking: Number 1 (2-week period); July 1993 ranking: Number 1; 1993 ranking: Number 25	Little Bit…
2nd Period	17 November 1993	"Jumpin' Jack Boy" (ジャンピン・ジャック・ボーイ)	Lyrics: Show Wesugi; Music: Seiichirou Kuribayashi; Arrangement: Takeshi Hayama	White Memories	B-Gram Records	Weekly ranking: Number 2; 1993 ranking: Number 106; 1994 ranking: Number 44	PIECE OF MY SOUL
2nd Period	8 June 1994	"Sekai ga Owaru Made wa..." (世界が終るまでは…)	Lyrics: Show Wesugi; Music: Tetsurō Oda; Arrangement: 'Takeshi Hayama	Just a Lonely Boy	B-Gram Records	Weekly ranking: Number 1 (2-week period); 1994 ranking: Number 10	PIECE OF MY SOUL
2nd Period	13 February 1995	"Secret Night ~ It's My Treat ~" (シークレット・ナイト 〜イッツ・マイ・トリート〜)	Lyrics: Show Wesugi; Music: Seiichirou Kuribayashi; Arrangement: Daisuke Ikeda	KEEP ON DREAM	B-Gram Records	Weekly ranking: Number 1; 1995 ranking: Number 53	PIECE OF MY SOUL
2nd Period	4 December 1995	"Same Side" (セイム・サイド)	Lyrics: Show Wesugi; Music: Show Wesugi, Hiroshi Shibasaki; Arrangement: Wands	Sleeping Fish	B-Gram Records	Weekly ranking: Number 2; 1996 ranking: Number 128	WANDS Historical Best Album
2nd Period	1 February 1996	"Worst Crime: About a Rock Star who was a Swindler" (ワースト・クライム 〜アバウト・ア・ロック・スター・フー・ワズ・ア・スウィンダラー〜)	Lyrics: Show Wesugi; Music: Hiroshi Shibasaki; Arrangement: Hiroshi Shibasaki	Blind To My Heart (ブラインド・トゥー・マイ・ハート)	B-Gram Records	Weekly ranking: Number 9; 1996 ranking: Number 183	WANDS Historical Best Album
3rd Period	3 September 1997	"Sabitsuita Machine Gun de Ima o Uchinukō" (錆びついたマシンガンで今を撃ち抜こう)	Lyrics: Miho Komatsu; Music: Miho Komatsu; Arrangement: Daisuke Ikeda	Try Again 錆びついたマシンガンで今を撃ち抜こう (オリジナル・カラオケ)	B-Gram Records	Weekly ranking: Number 4	AWAKE
3rd Period	11 February 1998	"Brand New Love" (ブランド・ニュー・ラブ)	Lyrics: Izumi Sakai (Zard); Music: Masaaki Watanuki; Arrangement: Wands	Hurts Good ブランド・ニュー・ラブ (オリジナル・カラオケ)	B-Gram Records	Weekly ranking: Number 17	AWAKE
3rd Period	10 June 1998	"Ashita Moshi Kimi ga Kowaretemo" (明日もし君が壊れても)	Lyrics: Izumi Sakai; Music: Aika Ohno; Arrangement: Wands	Soldier 明日もし君が壊れても (オリジナル・カラオケ)	B-Gram Records	Weekly ranking: Number 8; 1998 ranking: Number 189	AWAKE
3rd Period	31 March 1999	"Kyou, Nanika no Hazumi de Ikiteiru" (「今日、ナニカノハズミデ生きている」)	Lyrics: Azuki Nana (Garnet Crow); Music: Makoto Miyoshi (Rumania Montevideo); Arrangement: Wands	Freeze 「今日、ナニカノハズミデ生きている」(オリジナル・カラオケ)	B-Gram Records	Weekly ranking: Number 32	AWAKE
5th Period	29 January 2020	"Makkana Lip" (真っ赤なLip)	Lyrics: Uehara Daishi; Music: Kousuke Ohshima; Arrangement: Kousuke Ohshima	もっと強く抱きしめたなら 時の扉 〜WANDS 第5期 ver.〜	Giza Studio	Weekly ranking: Number 14	BURN THE SECRET
5th Period	20 May 2020	"Dakiyose, Takamaru, Kimi no Taion to Tomoni" (抱き寄せ 高まる 君の体温と共に)	Lyrics: Uehara Daishi; Music: Hiroshi Shibasaki	Just a Lonely Boy 愛を語るより口づけをかわそう 〜WANDS 第5期 ver.〜	Giza Studio	Weekly ranking: Number 3	BURN THE SECRET
5th Period	19 September 2020	"Secret Night ~ It's My Treat ~ 〜WANDS 第5期 ver.〜" (シークレット・ナイト 〜イッツ・マイ・トリート〜 〜ワンズ 第5期 ver.〜) ※DIGITAL ONLY RELEASE※	Lyrics: Uehara Daishi; Music: Hiroshi Shibasaki	-	Giza Studio	Weekly ranking: TBA	BURN THE SECRET
5th Period	9 June 2021	"Kanaria Naita Koro Ni" (カナリア鳴いた頃に)	Lyrics: Uehara Daishi; Music: Hiroshi Shibasaki	錆びついたマシンガンで今を撃ち抜こう; Brand New Love 〜WANDS 第5期 ver.〜	Giza Studio	Weekly ranking: Number 9	BURN THE SECRET
5th Period	3 November 2021	"Yura Yura" (ゆら ゆら)	Lyrics: Uehara Daishi; Music: Hiroshi Shibasaki	MILLION MILES AWAY 〜WANDS 第5期 ver.〜 Jumpin' Jack Boy 〜WANDS 第5期 ver.〜	Giza Studio	Weekly ranking: Number 9	BURN THE SECRET
5th Period	23 August 2022	"Ai o Sakebitai" (愛を叫びたい) ※DIGITAL ONLY RELEASE※	Lyrics: Uehara Daishi; Music: Hiroshi Shibasaki	-	Giza Studio	Weekly ranking: Number 30	Version 5.0 Rerelease 30.08.23
5th Period	28 August 2022	"Sekai ga Owaru Made wa... 〜WANDS 第5期 ver.〜" (世界が終るまでは… 〜ワンズ 第5期 ver.〜) ※DIGITAL ONLY RELEASE※	Lyrics: Show Wesugi, Uehara Daishi; Music: Hiroshi Shibasaki	-	Giza Studio	Weekly ranking: TBA	Version 5.0 Rerelease 30.08.23
5th Period	17 May 2023	"Raise Insight" ( 洞察力を高める)	Lyrics: Show Wesugi, Uehara Daishi; Music: Hiroshi Shibasaki	Raise Insight (オリジナル・カラオケ)	Giza Studio	Weekly ranking: Number 9	Version 5.0
5th Period	5 January 2024 （Digital Singles） 10 April 2024 （CD Singles）	"Daitan" (大胆) ※DIGITAL ONLY RELEASE※	Lyrics: Uehara Daishi; Music: Hiroshi Shibasaki	真っ赤なLip [LIVE ver. from WANDS Live Tour 2023 〜SHOUT OUT!〜] （CD Singles） honey （CD Singles）	Giza Studio	Weekly ranking: Number 32（Digital）	TIME STEW
5th Period	22 January 2025	‘’Shooting star‘’	Lyrics: Uehara Daishi Music: Hiroshi Shibasaki	-	Giza Studio		TIME STEW

=== Collaboration singles ===
Release date	Title	Album information	Label	Oricon charts
28 October 1992	Sekaijū no Dare Yori Kitto (世界中の誰よりきっと) with Miho Nakayama	Lyrics: Show Wesugi, Miho Nakayama; Music: Tetsurō Oda; Arrangement: Takeshi Hayama	King Records	Weekly Ranking: Number 1; 1992 ranking: Number 31; January 1992 Ranking: Number 1; 1993 ranking: Number 10
9 June 1993	Hateshinai Yume wo (果てしない夢を) with ZYYG, Rev, Zard featuring Shigeo Nagashima	Lyrics and Music: Show Wesugi, Izumi Sakai, Masayuki Deguchi, Seiichirou Kuribayashi	Zain Records	Weekly ranking: Number 2

== VHS, DVD and Blu-Rays ==
Title	Release date	Format	Period	Label	Oricon charts
Best of WANDS Video History (ベスト・オブ・ワンズ・ビデオ・ヒストリー)	9 June 2000 (VHS); 1 August 2000 (DVD)	VHS & DVD	1st - 3rd	B-Gram Records	-
WANDS Best Live & Clips (ワンズ・ライブ・ベスト・アンド・クリップス)	8 August 2012	DVD	1st - 3rd	B-Gram Records	23
Legend of 90s J-Rock Best Live & Clips (レジェンド・オブ・ナインティーズ・ジェイロック「ライブ・ベスト・アンド・クリップス」)	8 August 2012	DVD	1st - 3rd	B-Gram Records	59
WANDS Streaming Live ~BURN THE SECRET~ (ワンズ・ストリーミング・ライブ バーン・ザ・シークレット)	7 April 2021	BLU RAY	5th	Giza Studio	-
WANDS Live Tour 2022 ～FIRST ACT 5th period～ (ワンズ・ライブ・ツアー・2022 [最初の活動 第5期])	17 May 2023	BLU RAY	5th	Giza Studio	-
WANDS Live Tour 2023 ～SHOUT OUT～ (ワンズ・ライブツア ー 2023)	28 February 2024	BLU RAY	5th	Giza Studio	-
