= Noriko Sakai discography =

- Studio albums: 16 (Note: This includes the cover albums.)
- EPs: 2
- Compilation albums: 17
- Singles: 36
- Box sets: 2

The discography of the Japanese entertainer Noriko Sakai consists of 16 studio albums, 17 compilation albums, and 36 singles released since 1987.

== Albums ==
=== Studio albums ===
Year	Information	Oricon weekly peak position	Sales	RIAJ certification
1987	Fantasia: Noriko Part I: Released: July 1, 1987; Label: Victor; Formats: LP, CD, cassette	19		
1988	Yume Bōken: Noriko Special: Released: January 1, 1988; Label: Victor; Formats: LP, CD, cassette	15		
1988	Guanbare: Noriko Part II: Released: March 16, 1988; Label: Victor; Formats: LP, CD, cassette	8		
1988	Lovely Times: Noriko Part III: Released: August 21, 1988; Label: Victor; Formats: LP, CD, cassette	8		
1989	Blue Wind: Noriko Part IV: Released: June 21, 1989; Label: Victor; Formats: LP, CD, cassette	9		
1989	My Dear: Noriko Part V: Released: December 16, 1989; Label: Victor; Formats: LP, CD, cassette	13		
1990	White Girl: Noriko Part VI: Released: July 4, 1990; Label: Victor; Formats: CD, cassette	9		
1991	Sweet 'n' Bitter: Noriko Part VII: Released: January 21, 1991; Label: Victor; Formats: CD, cassette	8		
1991	Magical Montage Company: Noriko Part VIII: Released: July 21, 1991; Label: Victor; Formats: CD, cassette	22		
1992	Mammoth: Noriko Part IX: Released: July 22, 1992; Label: Victor; Formats: CD, cassette	26		
1993	Anata ga Michite Yuku: Noriko Part X: Released: July 21, 1993; Label: Victor; Formats: CD, cassette	40		
1994	10 Songs: Noriko Part XI: Released: July 21, 1994; Label: Victor; Formats: CD, cassette	58		
1996	No Make: Released: May 22, 1996; Label: Victor; Formats: CD, cassette	24		
1996	In Snowflakes: Released: December 18, 1996; Label: Victor; Formats: CD, cassette	15		
1998	Work Out Fine: Released: July 1, 1998; Label: Victor; Formats: CD, cassette	39		

=== Extended plays ===
Year	Information	Oricon weekly peak position	Sales	RIAJ certification
2014	Namida Hitotsubu: Released: January 22, 2014; Label: Space Shower Music; Formats: CD, digital	109		
2015	Truth (Tobenai Tori yo): Released: November 11, 2015; Label: Space Shower Music; Formats: CD, digital	206		

=== Cover albums ===
Year	Information	Oricon weekly peak position	Sales	RIAJ certification
2003	Moments: Released: September 6, 2003; Label: Sound Mission; Formats: CD	—		

=== Compilations ===
Year	Information	Oricon weekly peak position	Sales	RIAJ certification
1990	Singles: Noriko Best: Released: March 21, 1990; Label: Victor; Formats: CD, cassette	1		
1991	CD File: Noriko Sakai Vol. 1: Released: February 1, 1991; Label: Victor; Formats: CD	32		
1991	CD File: Noriko Sakai Vol. 2: Released: February 1, 1991; Label: Victor; Formats: CD	34		
1991	CD File: Noriko Sakai Vol. 3: Released: February 1, 1991; Label: Victor; Formats: CD	35		
1991	Sentimental Best: Released: December 5, 1991; Label: Victor; Formats: CD, cassette	47		
1992	Singles: Noriko Best II: Released: December 2, 1991; Label: Victor; Formats: CD, cassette	49		
1994	Natural Best: Released: February 2, 1994; Label: Victor; Formats: CD, cassette	50		
1995	Watercolour: Released: June 21, 1995; Label: Victor; Formats: CD, cassette	36		
1995	Twin Best: Released: July 12, 1995; Label: Victor; Formats: CD, cassette	84		
1999	Pure Collection: Released: June 23, 1999; Label: Victor; Formats: CD, cassette	—		
2000	Singles: Noriko Best III: Released: April 5, 2000; Label: Victor; Formats: CD	81		
2005	Noriko Sakai Best Collection: Released: March 24, 2005; Label: Victor; Formats: CD	—		
2005	Colezo! Twin: Noriko Sakai: Released: December 16, 2005; Label: Victor; Formats: CD	—		
2007	Daisuki: My Moments Best: Released: September 19, 2007; Label: Victor; Formats: CD	73		
2016	The Best Exhibition: Noriko Sakai 30th Anniversary Best Album: Released: September 21, 2016; Label: Victor; Formats: CD, digital	75		
2017	Golden Best: Released: February 22, 2017; Label: Victor; Formats: CD, digital	—		
2023	Premium Best: Released: July 19, 2023; Label: Victor; Formats: CD, CD+DVD, digital	35		

=== Box sets ===
Year	Information	Oricon weekly peak position	Sales	RIAJ certification
2002	Noriko Box: Released: March 21, 2002; Label: Victor; Formats: CD	—		
2017	Noriko Box: 30th Anniversary Mammoth Edition: Released: March 15, 2017; Label: Victor; Formats: CD	192		

== Singles ==
List of singles, with selected chart positions
Title	Date	Peak chart positions	Sales (JPN)	RIAJ certification	Album
Title	Date	Oricon Singles Charts	Sales (JPN)	RIAJ certification	Album
"Otoko no Ko ni Naritai"	February 5, 1987	6	48,000		Fantasia: Noriko Part I
"Nagisa no Fantasy"	May 21, 1987	4	60,000		Fantasia: Noriko Part I
"No-re-na-i Teen-age"	August 25, 1987	4	65,000		Yume Bōken: Noriko Special
"Yume Bōken"	November 25, 1987	4	69,000		Yume Bōken: Noriko Special
"Guanbare"	February 24, 1988	7	82,000		Guanbare: Noriko Part II
"Ichioku no Smile (Please Your Smile)"	May 18, 1988	2	91,000		Lovely Times: Noriko Part III
"Happy Again"	September 21, 1988	4	87,000		Singles: Noriko Best
"Honki wo Dashite"	January 1, 1989	4	98,000		Singles: Noriko Best
"Otoki no Kuni no Birthday"	February 14, 1989	6	46,000		Singles: Noriko Best
"Love Letter"	April 26, 1989	5	91,000		Blue Wind: Noriko Part IV
"Sayonara wo Sugite"	August 2, 1989	8	82,000		Non-album single
"All Right"	November 21, 1989	10	50,000		My Dear: Noriko Part V
"Kōfuku Nante Hoshikunai wa"	February 21, 1990	10	64,000		White Girl: Noriko Part VI
"Diamond Blue"	May 21, 1990	9	51,000		White Girl: Noriko Part VI
"Hohoemi wo Mitsuketa"	August 21, 1990	9	52,000		Sweet 'n' Bitter: Noriko Part VII
"Eve no Tamago"	November 21, 1990	10	42,000		Sweet 'n' Bitter: Noriko Part VII
"Anata ni Tenshi ga Mieru Toki"	March 21, 1991	12	39,000		Magical Montage Company
"Montage"	June 21, 1991	16	35,000		Magical Montage Company
"Namida ga Tomaranai"	November 7, 1991	21	24,000		Non-album single
"Karui Kimochi no Julia"	March 4, 1992	19	27,000		Non-album single
"Nagisa no Pitecan Trops"	June 21, 1992	34	21,000		Mammoth
"Tabun Taboo"	November 6, 1992	54	10,000		Non-album single
"Anata ga Michite Yuku"	May 21, 1993	60	11,000		Anata ga Michite Yuku
"Egao ga Wasurerarenai"	November 21, 1993	89	7,000		Natural Best
"Sasowarete…"	June 22, 1994	65	6,000		10 Songs
"Oh Oh Oh (We Are the Winners)"	February 22, 1995	—			Non-album single
"Aoi Usagi"	May 10, 1995	5	997,000	2× Platinum	Watercolours
"Here I Am (Nakitai Toki wa Nakeba Ii)"	April 24, 1996	24	87,000		No Make
"Kagami no Dress"	October 9, 1996	9	447,000	Platinum	In Snowflakes
"Namida-iro"	September 24, 1997	20	118,000		Work Out Fine
"Yokogao"	May 13, 1998	30	86,000		Work Out Fine
"Pure"	April 1, 1999	50	11,000		Pure Collection
"Words of Love"	April 5, 2000	42	8,000		Daisuki: My Moments Best
"Miracle"	November 1, 2000	—			Daisuki: My Moments Best
"Tenka Muteki no Ai"	June 23, 2004	—			Daisuki: My Moments Best
"Sekaijū no Dare Yori Kitto"	August 22, 2007	44			Daisuki: My Moments Best
"—" denotes releases that did not chart.

== International releases ==
Release date	Work	Label	Notes
November 1, 1994	"Wéixiào" (微笑, "Smile")	JVC	Chinese version of "Hohoemi wo Mitsuketa"
February 1, 1996	"Wǒ ài měirényú" (我愛美人魚, "I Love Mermaids")	JVC	
May 22, 1996	"Yǒu yuán qiānlǐ" (有縁千里, "There Are Thousands of Miles Away")	JVC	Duet with Eric Suen
November 28, 1997	Asian Collection '97	JVC	
October 1, 1998	Asian Tour Special: Asian Collection '98	JVC	
October 1, 2000	Asia 2000: Words of Love	JVC	
February 26, 2014	"Jìmò de xiǎo bì tù (Aoi Usagi)" (寂寞的小碧兔-碧いうさぎ-, "Lonely Little Blue Rabbit")	Office Nigun Niiba	Chinese version of "Aoi Usagi"

== Other recordings ==
Release date	Work	Song	Notes
June 7, 1989	Gunbuster	"Active Heart"	OVA opening theme (eps. 1–3); ending theme (ep. 4)
June 7, 1989	Gunbuster	"Try Again...!"	OVA ending theme (eps. 1–3)
