= Singles Collection +6 =

Greatest hits album by Wands
- Released: 16 March 1996
- Recorded: 1991–1996
- Genre: Japanese pop
- Length: 65 minutes
- Label: B-Gram Records
- Producer: BMF

Wands chronology
Piece of My Soul (1995)	Singles Collection +6 (1996)	Wands Historical Best Album (1997)

Singles Collection +6 is the first greatest hits album by Japanese pop-rock band Wands.

== Release ==
It was released on 16 March 1996 under B-Gram Records label. Album includes all singles released so far, two pick-ups from their studio albums and one new song exclusively for this album.

== Reception ==
The album reached #1 in its first week and sold 221,000 copies. The album charted for 14 weeks and sold more than 831,000 copies.

== Line up ==
This is the last album featuring former members with vocalist Show Uesugi. The next album was released with completely new band members.

== Track listing ==
All lyrics are written by Show Uesugi.

No.	Title	Music	Arrangers	Length
1.	"Tenshi ni Nante Narenakatta" (from 3rd studio album Little Bit…)	Hiroshi Shibasaki	Takeshi Hayama	5:11
2.	"Toki no Tobira" (時の扉, 5th single)	Kousuke Ohshima	Masao Akashi	4:16
3.	"Motto Tsuyoku Kimi wo Dakishimetara" (もっと強く抱きしめたなら, 3rd single)	Yoshio Tatano	Takeshi Hayama	4:59
4.	"Koiseyo Otome -Remix-" (恋せよ乙女～Remix～, remixed version of 6th single)	Kousuke Ohshima	Takeshi Hayama	4:15
5.	"Sekaijū no Dare Yori Kitto -Album version-" (世界中の誰よりきっと～Album Version～, duet single with Miho Nakayama)	Tetsurō Oda	Takeshi Hayama	4:27
6.	"Just a Lonely Boy" (8th single's c/w)	Hiroshi Shibasaki	Wands	4:21
7.	"Arifureta Kotoba de" (ありふれた言葉で, 6th single's c/w)	Hiroshi Shibasaki	Takeshi Hayama	4:24
8.	"Shiroku Somare" (白く染まれ, new song)	Daria Kawashima	Takeshi Hayama	4:45
9.	"Furimuite Dakishimete" (ふりむいて抱きしめて, 2nd single)	Kousuke Ohshima	Kousuke Ohshima	4:01
10.	"Sabishisa wa Aki no Iro" (寂しさは秋の色, debut single)	Seiichiro Kuribayashi	Masao Akashi	4:45
11.	"Hoshi no Nai Sora no Shita de" (星のない空の下で, from 2nd studio album Toki no Tobira)	Hiroshi Shibasaki	Wands	4:45
12.	"Jumpin' Jack Boy" (7th single)	Seiichiro Kuribayashi	Takeshi Hayama	3:37
13.	"Ai wo Kataru yori Kuchizuke wo Kawasou" (愛を語るより口づけをかわそう, 5th single)	Tetsurō Oda	Masao Akashi	4:29
14.	"Sekai ga Owaru Made wa..." (世界が終るまでは…, 8th single)	Tetsurō Oda	Takeshi Hayama	5:15
