= Treasury (album) =

Compilation album by Miho Nakayama
- Released: April 9, 1997
- Recorded: 1986–1996
- Genre: J-pop; city pop; dance-pop; pop rock; R&B
- Length: 72:52
- Language: Japanese
- Label: King Records

Miho Nakayama chronology
Ballads II (1996)	Treasury (1997)	Groovin' Blue (1997)

Singles from Treasury
- 1. "Mirai e no Present" Released: November 1, 1996

Treasury (トレジャリー, Torejarī) is the ninth compilation album by Japanese entertainer Miho Nakayama. Released through King Records on April 7, 1997, the album compiles 15 songs selected by Nakayama from her past recordings, including her final top-10 hit "Mirai e no Present" (featuring Mayo). The initial release of the album came with an 88-page hardcover photo book containing her full discography and videography from 1985 to 1996.

The album peaked at No. 3 on Oricon's albums chart. It sold over 333,000 copies and was certified Gold by the RIAJ.

== Track listing ==
No.	Title	Lyrics	Music	Arrangement	Length
1.	"Catch Me"	Toshiki Kadomatsu	Kadomatsu	Kadomatsu	4:13
2.	"You're My Only Shinin' Star"	Kadomatsu	Kadomatsu	Kadomatsu; Kazuo Ōtani (strings); Shin Kazuhara (brass)	4:42
3.	"Mermaid" (Māmeido (人魚姫 mermaid))	Chinfa Kan	Cindy	Rod Antoon	4:09
4.	"Rosécolor"	Kan	Cindy	Yūji Toriyama	5:03
5.	"Rosa"	Issaque	Yoshimasa Inoue	ATOM	5:15
6.	"Tōi Machi no Doko ka de..." ((遠い街のどこかで…; "Somewhere in a Distant City..."))	Mika Watanabe	Hideya Nakazaki	Nakazaki	5:57
7.	"Sekaijū no Dare Yori Kitto (Miho Nakayama & Wands)" ((世界中の誰よりきっと; "Surely More Than Anyone in the World"))	Show Wesugi; Miho Nakayama	Tetsurō Oda	Takeshi Hayama	4:08
8.	"Shiawase ni Naru Tame ni" ((幸せになるために; "To Be Happy"))	Yūho Iwasato; Nakayama	Toshifumi Hinata	Hinata	4:18
9.	"Tada Nakitaku Naru no" ((ただ泣きたくなるの; "I Just Feel Like Crying"))	Yurie Kokubu; Nakayama	Masaki Iwamoto	Iwamoto	5:03
10.	"Sea Paradise (OL no Hanran)" ((Sea Paradise -OLの反乱-; "Sea Paradise -An Office Lady's Rebellion-"))	Nakayama	KNACK	ATOM	6:21
11.	"Hero"	Mariah Carey; Nakayama	Carey; Walter Afanasieff	Robbie Buchanan	4:54
12.	"Hurt to Heart (Itami no Yukue)" ((Hurt to Heart〜痛みの行方〜; "Hurt to Heart ~Whereabouts of Pain"))	Keiko Yokoyama	Yokoyama	Jerry Hey	5:13
13.	"Thinking About You (Anata no Yoru wo Tsutsumitai)" ((Thinking About You〜あなたの夜を包みたい〜; "Thinking About You ~I Want to Wrap Your Night~"))	Masato Odake	Maria	Kazuo Ōtani	4:53
14.	"True Romance"	Odake	Inoue	Hajime Mizoguchi	4:16
15.	"Mirai e no Present (Miho Nakayama with Mayo)" (Mirai e no Purezento (未来へのプレゼント; "A Present for the Future"))	Mayo Okamoto; Nakayama	Okamoto	Tomoji Sogawa	4:26
Total length:					72:52

== Charts ==
Chart (1997)	Peak position
Japanese Albums (Oricon)	3

== Certification ==
Region	Certification	Certified units/sales
Japan (RIAJ)	Gold	200,000^{^}
^{^} Shipments figures based on certification alone.
