= Wands Historical Best Album =

Greatest hits album by Wands
- Released: 6 November 1997
- Recorded: 1991–1997
- Genre: Japanese pop
- Length: 64 minutes
- Label: B-Gram Records
- Producer: BMF

Wands chronology
| Singles Collection +6 (1996) | Wands Historical Best Album (1997) | Awake (1999) |

Wands Historical Best Album is the second greatest hits album by Japanese pop-rock band Wands. It was released on 6 November 1997 under B-Gram Records label. This is album was released by new members of Wands. Album includes singles with vocalists Show Uesugi and Jiro Waku. Most of the tracks has received completely new arranged versions. The album reached #1 in its first week and sold 174,870 copies. The album charted for 11 weeks and sold more than 379,490 copies. This is WANDS' last album which reached #1 in Oricon.

== Track listing ==
All lyrics are written by Show Uesugi (#1-#11, #14), Miho Komatsu (#12) and Shinya Kimura (#13).

| No. | Title | Music | Arrangers | Length |
|---|---|---|---|---|
| 1. | "Sabishisa wa Aki no Iro" (寂しさは秋の色, debut single) | Seiichiro Kuribayashi | Masao Akashi | 4:45 |
| 2. | "Furimuite Dakishimete" (ふりむいて抱きしめて, 2nd single) | Kousuke Ohshima | Kousuke Ohshima | 4:01 |
| 3. | "Motto Tsuyoku Kimi wo Dakishimetara" (もっと強く抱きしめたなら, 3rd single) | Yoshio Tatano | Takeshi Hayama | 4:59 |
| 4. | "Sekaijū no Dare Yori Kitto -Album version-" (世界中の誰よりきっと～Album Version～, duet single with Miho Nakayama) | Tetsurō Oda | Takeshi Hayama | 4:27 |
| 5. | "Toki no Tobira" (時の扉, 4th single) | Kousuke Ohshima | Masao Akashi | 4:16 |
| 6. | "Ai wo Kataru yori Kuchizuke wo Kawasou" (愛を語るより口づけをかわそう, 5th single) | Tetsurō Oda | Masao Akashi | 4:29 |
| 7. | "Koiseyo Otome -Remix-" (恋せよ乙女～Remix～, 6th single) | Kousuke Ohshima | Takeshi Hayama | 4:15 |
| 8. | "Sekai ga Owaru Made wa..." (世界が終るまでは…,8th single) | Tetsurō Oda | Takeshi Hayama | 5:15 |
| 9. | "Secret Night 〜It's My Treat〜" (9th single) | Seiichiro Kuribayashi | Daisuke Ikeda | 5:27 |
| 10. | "Same Side" (10th single) | Hiroshi Shibasaki | Wands | 5:05 |
| 11. | "WORST CRIME〜About a rock star who was a swindler〜" (11th single) | Hiroshi Shibasaki | Hiroshi Shibasaki | 4:07 |
| 12. | "Sabitsuita Machine Gun de Ima wo Uchinikou" (錆びついたマシンガンで今を撃ち抜こう, 1st Jiro single) | Miho Komatsu | Daisuke Ikeda | 4:40 |
| 13. | "Try Again" (1st Jiro single c/w) | Shinya Kimura | Wands | 4:35 |
| 14. | "MILLION MILES AWAY" (Jiro's cover from album Piece of My Soul) | Shinya Kimura | Takeshi Hayama | 3:54 |
