= The Best Exhibition: Noriko Sakai 30th Anniversary Best Album =

Compilation album by Noriko Sakai
- Released: September 21, 2016
- Recorded: 1987–2015
- Genre: J-pop
- Length: 2:10:56
- Languages: Japanese; Mandarin Chinese
- Label: Victor

Noriko Sakai chronology
Truth (Tobenai Tori yo) (2015)	The Best Exhibition: Noriko Sakai 30th Anniversary Best Album (2016)	Golden Best (2017)

The Best Exhibition: Noriko Sakai 30th Anniversary Best Album (The Best Exhibition 酒井法子30thアニバーサリーベストアルバム) is a compilation album by Japanese entertainer Noriko Sakai. Released through Victor Entertainment on September 21, 2016, to celebrate Sakai's 30th anniversary, the album compiles 30 songs selected by her fans on an online poll, along with Chinese-language versions of "Yume Bōken" and "Aoi Usagi". Also included is a 60-page photo booklet.

The album peaked at No. 75 on Oricon's albums chart.

== Track listing ==
Disc 1
No.	Title	Lyrics	Music	Arrangement	Length
1.	"Otoko no Ko ni Naritai" ((男のコになりたい; "I Want to Be a Man"))	Yoshiko Miura	Frankie T	Mitsuo Hagita	3:11
2.	"Nagisa no Fantasy" (Nagisa no Fantashi (渚のファンタシィ; "Fantasy at the Beach"))	Ichiko Takehana	Yukihide Takekawa	Hiroshi Shinkawa	3:42
3.	"No-re-na-i Teen-age" ((ノ・レ・な・いTeen-age))	Hiromi Mori	Eiji Nishiki	Osamu Totsuka	3:54
4.	"Yume Bōken" ((夢冒険; "Dream Adventure"))	H. Mori	Nishiki	Nobuyuki Nakamura	3:08
5.	"Guanbare"	Yukinojo Mori	Kōji Makaino	Makaino	3:44
6.	"Don't Stop Genki"	H. Mori	Nishiki	Makaino	3:59
7.	"Ichioku no Smile (Please Your Smile)" (Ichioku no Sumairu (1億のスマイル － PLEASE YOUR SMILE －; "One Million Smiles - Please Your Smile -"))	H. Mori	Ryō Asuka	Motoki Funayama	3:53
8.	"Nori-P Ondo" ((のりピー音頭))	H. Mori	Makaino	Jirō Takemura	3:04
9.	"Active Heart" (Akutibu Hāto (アクティブ・ハート))	H. Mori	Nishiki	Funayama	3:24
10.	"Happy Again"	H. Mori	Nishiki	Funayama	3:47
11.	"Love Letter"	Amii Ozaki	Ozaki	Jun Satō	4:48
12.	"Sayonara wo Sugite" ((さよならを過ぎて; "After Goodbye"))	Etsuko Kisugi	Katsuki Maeda	Funayama	4:50
13.	"All Right"	Shirō Sagisu	Kyōko Endō	Endō	4:52
14.	"Diamond Blue" (Daiyamondo Burū (ダイヤモンド☆ブルー))	Endō	Endō	Nittoku Inoue	3:59
15.	"White Girl" (Howaito Gāru (ホワイト・ガール))	Endō	Endō	Inoue	4:18
16.	"Yume Bōken (Chinese Version: Mèng màoxiǎn) [Bonus Track]" (Yume Bōken (Chūgokugo Bājon) (夢冒険（中国語バージョン）))	H. Mori	Nishiki	Nakamura	3:09

Disc 2
No.	Title	Lyrics	Music	Arrangement	Length
1.	"Hohoemi wo Mitsuketa" ((微笑みを見つけた; "I Found a Smile"))	Endō	Kisaburō Suzuki	Inoue	4:32
2.	"Eve no Tamago" (Ivu no Tamago (イヴの卵; "Eve's Egg"))	Neko Oikawa	Mayumi	Etsuko Yamakawa	4:35
3.	"Anata ni Tenshi ga Mieru Toki" ((あなたに天使が見える時; "When You See an Angel"))	Yukinojo Mori	Akio Dobashi	Dobashi	5:03
4.	"Nagisa no Pitecan Trops" (Nagisa no Pitekan Toropusu (渚のピテカントロプス; "The Pitecan Trops of the Seas"))	Chinfa Kan	Ichirō Haneda	Haneda	3:27
5.	"Anata ga Michite Yuku" ((あなたが満ちてゆく; "You Fill Me Up"))	Kanata Asamizu	Project Moonlight Cafe	Shūji Tashiro	4:43
6.	"Sasowarete..." ((誘われて…; "Invite Me..."))	Project Moonlight Cafe	Project Moonlight Cafe	Project Moonlight Cafe	4:27
7.	"Aoi Usagi" ((碧いうさぎ; "Blue Rabbit"))	Emi Makiho	Tetsurō Oda	Hiroshi Shinkawa	3:46
8.	"Here I Am (Nakitai Toki wa Nakeba Ii)" ((Here I am ～泣きたい時は泣けばいい～; "Here I Am ~If You Want to Cry, Just Cry~"))	Yasushi Akimoto	Daria Kawashima	Shinkawa	3:58
9.	"Kagami no Dress" (Kagami no Doresu (鏡のドレス; "Mirror Dress"))	Lala Miura	Kyōichi Usamoto	Takayuki Hijikata	4:00
10.	"Namida-iro" ((涙色; "The Color of Tears"))	Ryuichi Kawamura	Kawamura	Hijikata	4:28
11.	"Yokogao" ((横顔; "Profile"))	Midori Karashima	Karashima	Tomoji Sogawa	4:53
12.	"Pure"	Fumiya Fujii	Naoki Masumoto	Hijikata	4:16
13.	"Sekaijū no Dare Yori Kitto" ((世界中の誰よりきっと; "Surely More Than Anyone in the World"))	Show Wesugi; Miho Nakayama	Tetsurō Oda	Hijikata	4:04
14.	"Namida Hitotsubu" ((涙ひとつぶ; "One Tear"))	Oikawa	Kōsuke Ōba	Ōba	5:20
15.	"Truth (Tobenai Tori yo)" ((Truth ～飛べない鳥よ～; Truth ~Flightless Bird~))	Hirotaka Koizumi	Hideya Nakazaki	Nakazaki	3:59
16.	"Aoi Usagi (Chinese Version: Jìmò de xiǎo bì tù) [Bonus Track]" (Aoi Usagi (Chūgokugo Bājon: Jìmò de xiǎo bì tù) (碧いうさぎ（中国語バージョン：寂寞的小碧兔）))	Makiho	Oda	Shinkawa	3:45

== Charts ==
Chart (2016)	Peak position
Japanese Albums (Oricon)	75
