= Piece of My Soul =

Piece of My Soul may refer to:

- Piece of My Soul (Garou album)
- Piece of My Soul (Wands album)
