= Ballads II =

Compilation album by Miho Nakayama
- Released: December 18, 1996
- Recorded: 1991–1996
- Genres: J-pop; kayōkyoku
- Length: 76:17
- Language: Japanese
- Label: King Records

Miho Nakayama chronology
Deep Lip French (1996)	Ballads II (1996)	Treasury (1997)

Ballads II (バラード・ツー, Barādo Tsū) is the eighth compilation album by Japanese entertainer Miho Nakayama. Released through King Records on December 18, 1996, the album features 15 ballads selected by Nakayama from her past releases. To coincide with the release of this album, the 1989 compilation Ballads was reissued on the same day with a new matching cover art.

The album peaked at No. 25 on Oricon's albums chart and sold over 41,000 copies.

== Track listing ==
No.	Title	Lyrics	Music	Arrangement	Length
1.	"Silent"	Miho Nakayama	Chiho Kiyooka	Yoshio Tsuru	5:09
2.	"Dare ka ga Ai ni..." ((誰かが愛に…; "Someone Loves..."))	Nakayama	Masaya Ozeki	ATOM	5:41
3.	"Flash Back"	Nakayama	Chika Ueda	Nittoku Inoue; ATOM	5:16
4.	"Kiss Kiss Kiss"	Nakayama	Hiroshi Narumi; Makio Tada	Narumi; Tada	4:54
5.	"Treasure"	Yui Nishiwaki	Nishiwaki; Yōko Orihara	Nobuo Ariga	5:49
6.	"Shiawase ni Naru Tame ni" ((幸せになるために; "To Be Happy"))	Yuho Iwasato; Nakayama	Toshifumi Hinata	Hinata	4:17
7.	"Konna Hi no Ame nara Daisuki (The Rain Came Down)" ((こんな日の雨なら好き -The Rain Came Down-; "I Like the Rain on Such a Day ~The Rain Came Down~"))	Nakayama; Amie	Marc Hoffman; Elliot Weiss	Ken Shiguma	5:57
8.	"Anata wo Sora e Todoketai" ((あなたを宇宙（そら）へ届けたい; "I Want to Deliver You to the Stars"))	Nakayama	KNACK	KNACK	5:28
9.	"16 Blanco" (16 Buranko (16ブランコ))	Nakayama	Maria	Hajime Mizoguchi	5:30
10.	"Love"	Nakayama; Masato Odake; Cindy	Cindy	Kenny Harris	5:18
11.	"Sweet n' Sour Soup"	Odake	Maria	Jai Widing	3:42
12.	"Rain Ring [Fade Out Version]"	Nakayama	Maria	Mizoguchi	5:13
13.	"Fui no Kiss" ((不意のKiss; "Sudden Kiss"))	Maria	Maria	Mizoguchi	4:41
14.	"Angel"	Nakayama; Odake	Maria	Mizoguchi	4:32
15.	"Thinking About You (Anata no Yoru wo Tsutsumitai)" ((Thinking About You〜あなたの夜を包みたい〜; "Thinking About You ~I Want to Wrap Your Night~"))	Odake	Maria	Kazuo Ōtani	4:50

== Charts ==
Chart (1996)	Peak position
Japanese Albums (Oricon)	25
