= Dramatic Songs =

Compilation album by Miho Nakayama
- Released: January 20, 1993
- Recorded: 1985–1992
- Genre: J-pop; kayōkyoku; dance-pop; pop rock
- Length: 42:48
- Language: Japanese
- Label: King Records
- Producer: Akira Fukuzumi

Miho Nakayama chronology
Mellow (1992)	Dramatic Songs (1993)	Wagamama na Actress (1993)

Singles from Dramatic Songs
- 1. "Sekaijū no Dare Yori Kitto" Released: October 28, 1992

Dramatic Songs: Miho Nakayama on TV Theme (ドラマティック・ソングス, Doramatikku Songusu) is the fifth compilation album by Japanese entertainer Miho Nakayama. Released through King Records on January 20, 1993, the album compiles Nakayama's songs that were used as theme songs or image songs for TV dramas she starred in from 1985 to 1992. The popularity of the No. 1 single "Sekaijū no Dare Yori Kitto" (featuring Wands) helped boost the album's sales.

The album peaked at No. 2 on Oricon's albums chart. It sold over 435,000 copies and was certified Platinum by the RIAJ.

== Track listing ==
No.	Title	Lyrics	Music	Arrangement	Length
1.	"C"	Takashi Matsumoto	Kyōhei Tsutsumi	Mitsuo Hagita	3:28
2.	"Waku Waku Sasete" ((WAKU WAKUさせて; "Excite Me More"))	Matsumoto	Tsutsumi	Motoki Funayama	3:59
3.	"Hade!!!" ((「派手!!!」; "Flashy!!!"))	Matsumoto	Tsutsumi	Funayama	4:02
4.	"Catch Me"	Toshiki Kadomatsu	Kadomatsu	Kadomatsu	4:12
5.	"Mermaid" (Māmeido (人魚姫 mermaid))	Chinfa Kan	Cindy	Rod Antoon	4:09
6.	"Aishiterutte Iwanai!" ((愛してるっていわない!; "I Don't Love You!"))	Yoshihiko Andō	Hitoshi Haba	Nobuhiko Kashiwara	3:46
7.	"Tōi Machi no Doko ka de..." ((遠い街のどこかで…; "Somewhere in a Distant City..."))	Mika Watanabe	Hideya Nakazaki	Nakazaki	5:58
8.	"Sekaijū no Dare Yori Kitto (Miho Nakayama & Wands)" ((世界中の誰よりきっと; "Surely More Than Anyone in the World"))	Show Wesugi; Miho Nakayama	Tetsurō Oda	Takeshi Hayama	4:07
9.	"Sekaijū no Dare Yori Kitto <Part II> (Acoustic Version) [Bonus Track]" ((世界中の誰よりきっと <Part II> （アコースティック・バージョン）))	Wesugi; Nakayama	Oda	Hayama	4:26
10.	"You're My Only Shinin' Star [Bonus Track]"	Kadomatsu	Kadomatsu	Kadomatsu; Kazuo Ōtani (strings); Shin Kazuhara (brass)	4:41
Total length:					42:48

== Charts ==
Weekly charts

Chart (1993)	Peak position
Japanese Albums (Oricon)	2

Year-end charts

Chart (1993)	Peak position
Japanese Albums (Oricon)	36

== Certification ==
Region	Certification	Certified units/sales
Japan (RIAJ)	Platinum	400,000^{^}
^{^} Shipments figures based on certification alone.
