= Mirai e no Present =

1996 single by Miho Nakayama and Mayo Okamoto

Single by Miho Nakayama with Mayo

from the album Treasury
- Language: Japanese
- English title: A Present for the Future
- B-side: "Darlin'"
- Released: November 1, 1996
- Recorded: 1996
- Genre: J-pop
- Length: 4:27
- Label: King Records
- Composer: Mayo Okamoto
- Lyricists: Mayo Okamoto; Miho Nakayama

Miho Nakayama singles chronology
"True Romance" (1996)	"Mirai e no Present" (1996)	"March Color" (1997)

Mayo Okamoto singles chronology
"Forever" (1996)	"Mirai e no Present" (1996)	"Alone" (1996)

"Mirai e no Present" (未来へのプレゼント, Mirai e no Purezento; lit. "A Present for the Future") is the 35th single by Japanese entertainer Miho Nakayama and a collaboration with Mayo Okamoto (as "Mayo"). Written by Okamoto and Nakayama, the single was released on November 1, 1996, by King Records.

== Background and release ==
"Mirai e no Present" was Nakayama's second collaboration single since "Sekaijū no Dare Yori Kitto" in 1992. Co-writer Okamoto performed backing vocals on the song; she later on self-covered the song as "Will... (Mirai e no Present)" on her 1997 album Smile.

The song was used as the theme song of the Fuji TV drama series Oishī Kankei (おいしい関係; A Tasty Relationship), which also starred Nakayama. The B-side, "Darlin", was used by Astel Tokyo on a commercial that also featured Nakayama.

"Mirai e no Present" peaked at No. 6 on Oricon's weekly singles chart, becoming her last career top-10 single. It sold over 409,000 copies and was Nakayama's last single to be certified Platinum by the RIAJ.

== Track listing ==
8cm CD single
No.	Title	Lyrics	Music	Arrangement	Length
1.	"Mirai e no Present" (Mirai e no Purezento (未来へのプレゼント; "A Present for the Future"))	Mayo Okamoto; Miho Nakayama	Okamoto	Tomoji Sogawa	4:27
2.	"Darlin'"	Nakayama	Chika Ueda	Etsuko Yamakawa	3:57
3.	"Mirai e no Present" (Original Karaoke)				4:27
4.	"Darlin'" (Original Karaoke)				3:55

== Charts ==
Chart (1996)	Peak position
Oricon Weekly Singles Chart	6

== Certification ==
Region	Certification	Certified units/sales
Japan (RIAJ)	Platinum	400,000^{^}
^{^} Shipments figures based on certification alone.
