= Best of Wands History =

Greatest hits album by Wands
- Released: 9 June 2000
- Recorded: 1991–2000
- Genre: Japanese pop
- Length: 77 minutes
- Label: B-Gram Records
- Producer: BMF

Wands chronology
Awake (1999)	Best of Wands History (2000)	Burn The Secret (2020)

Best of Wands History is the third and final greatest hits album by Japanese pop-rock band Wands. It was released on 9 June 2000 under B-Gram Records label. This album consists of selected singles and album pick-ups with vocalists Show Uesugi and Jiro Waku. The album reached #17 in its first week and sold 16,000 copies. The album charted for 4 weeks and sold more than 37,000 copies.

== Track listing ==
All lyrics are written by Show Uesugi (#1-#9, #12-#14,#16), Miho Komatsu (#10), Izumi Sakai (#11), Shinya Kimura (#18), Issei Sugimoto (#15) and Jirou Kazuhisa (#17)

No.	Title	Music	Arrangers	Length
1.	"Sekai ga Owaru Made wa..." (世界が終るまでは…, 8th single)	Tetsurō Oda	Takeshi Hayama	5:15
2.	"Toki no Tobira" (時の扉, 4th single)	Kousuke Ohshima	Masao Akashi	4:16
3.	"Motto Tsuyoku Kimi wo Dakishimetara" (もっと強く抱きしめたなら, 3rd single)	Yoshio Tatano	Takeshi Hayama	4:59
4.	"Ai wo Kataru yori Kuchizuke wo Kawasou" (愛を語るより口づけをかわそう, 5th single)	Tetsurō Oda	Masao Akashi	4:29
5.	"Koiseyo Otome" (恋せよ乙女, 6th single)	Kousuke Ohshima	Takeshi Hayama	4:15
6.	"Jumpin' Jack Boy" (7th single)	Seiichiro Kuribayashi	Takeshi Hayama	3:37
7.	"Secret Night 〜It's My Treat〜" (9th single)	Seiichiro Kuribayashi	Daisuke Ikeda	5:27
8.	"Same Side" (10th single)	Hiroshi Shibasaki	Wands	5:05
9.	"WORST CRIME〜About a rock star who was a swindler〜" (11th single)	Hiroshi Shibasaki	Hiroshi Shibasaki	4:07
10.	"Sabitsuita Machine Gun de Ima wo Uchinikou" (錆びついたマシンガンで今を撃ち抜こう, 1st Jiro single)	Miho Komatsu	Daisuke Ikeda	4:40
11.	"Ashita moshi Kimi ga Kowaretemo" (明日もし君が壊れても, 3rd Jiro single)	Aika Ohno	Wands	4:16
12.	"Sekaijū no Dare Yori Kitto -Live Version-" (世界中の誰よりきっと ～Live Version～も, liver ver. of duet single with Miho Nakayama)	Tetsurou Oda	Masao Akashi	2:55
13.	"Taiyou no Tame Iki" (太陽のため息, unreleased song by Show Uesugi)	Hiroshi Shibasaki	Takeshi Hayama	4:07
14.	"Baby Baby Baby" (2nd single's c/w)	Kousuke Ohshima	Kousuke Ohshima	3:49
15.	"FREEZE" (Jiro 4th single's c/w)	Issei Sugimoto	Wands	5:10
16.	"Don't cry" (from 3rd studio album Little Bit…)	Daria Kawashima	Takeshi Hayama	4:55
17.	"Please tell me Jesus" (from 5th studio album Awake)	Keiko Utoku	Wands	3:50
18.	"Awake" (from 5th studio album Awake)	Issei Sugimoto	Wands	3:31
