= Heaven's Coin =

1995 Japanese television drama series

- Written by: Yukari Tatsui
- Directed by: Hiroshi Yoshino and others
- Starring: Noriko Sakai; Takao Osawa; Yutaka Takenouchi; Naomi Hosokawa
- Composer: Hajime Mizoguchi
- Country of origin: Japan
- Original language: Japanese
- No. of seasons: 3
- No. of episodes: 35

Production
- Producer: Motoi Umehara
- Running time: 54 minutes
- Production company: NTV

Original release
- Network: NTV
- Release: April 12, 1995 – June 27, 2001

Heaven's Coin (星の金貨 ―Die Sterntaler―, Hoshi no Kinka; lit. "Stars' Coins") is a 1995 Japanese television drama series. The series revolves around Aya Kuramoto (倉本 彩, Kuramoto Aya), a deaf and mute girl from Hokkaido who is in love with a doctor named Shūichi Nagai (永井 秀一, Nagai Shūichi). After Shūichi leaves for Tokyo, he has an accident and loses his memory. Aya travels to Tokyo and encounters Takumi Nagai (永井 拓巳, Nagai Takumi), Shūichi's brother.

The sequel series, Heaven's Coin: Part 2 (続・星の金貨, Zoku Hoshi no Kinka), aired in 1996, continues where the previous series left off.

The third series, Heaven's Coin: Part 3 (新・星の金貨, Shin Hoshi no Kinka), which ran for 10 episodes in 2001, uses a new set of characters, starring Mari Hoshino as the deaf heroine.

The opening theme for the original season is "Aoi Usagi" by Noriko Sakai. The opening theme for Heaven's Coin: Part 2 is "Kagami no Dress", also by Sakai.

== Characters ==
=== Heaven's Coin ===
- Aya Kuramoto – Noriko Sakai
- Shūichi Nagai – Takao Osawa
- Takumi Nagai – Yutaka Takenouchi
- Miwa Koizumi – Minako Tanaka
- Shōko Yūki – Naomi Hosokawa
- Seiichirō Nagai – Raita Ryū
- Sonoko Endō – Tomomi Nishimura

=== Heaven's Coin: Part 2 ===
- Aya Kuramoto – Noriko Sakai
- Shūichi Nagai – Takao Osawa
- Takumi Nagai – Yutaka Takenouchi
- Keiko Kawamura – Naho Toda
- Toshiaki Yagami – Ikki Sawamura
- Miwa Koizumi – Minako Tanaka
- Shōko Yūki – Naomi Hosokawa
- Rika Sawai – Mai Hōshō

=== Heaven's Coin: The Final ===
- Aya Kuramoto – Noriko Sakai
- Shūichi Nagai – Takao Osawa
- Takumi Nagai – Yutaka Takenouchi
- Saori Hamano – Ryoko Hirosue

=== Heaven's Coin: Part 3 ===
- Kazuki Muraoka – Tatsuya Fujiwara
- Mahiru Morita – Mari Hoshino
- Makoto Iwase – Hisashi Yoshizawa
- Hiroto Sawaki – Mizuho Takasugi
- Mizuki Hasegawa – Megumi Okina

== TV schedule ==
Heaven's Coin

| Episode | Title | Directed by | Original airdate | Rating |
|---|---|---|---|---|
| 1 | (愛すれど哀しく…) | | April 12, 1995 | 7.2% |
| 2 | (失われた愛の記憶! 帰らぬ恋人のため地の果てまで) | | April 19, 1995 | 10.9% |
| 3 | (愛のない記念日…私の恋人を奪わないで) | | April 26, 1995 | 9.2% |
| 4 | (愛と死を見つめて…いま蘇る! 愛の記憶) | | May 3, 1995 | 10.9% |
| 5 | (心の旅路! 命の限り叫んでも届かない愛) | | May 10, 1995 | 12.5% |
| 6 | (恋人を殺さないで! 嫉妬のメス) | | May 24, 1995 | 12.2% |
| 7 | (別れの誕生日! 愛の想い出、ありがとう) | | May 3, 1995 | 15.2% |
| 8 | (悲しい婚約! 愛する人、さよなら…でも) | | June 7, 1995 | 14.2% |
| 9 | (あの胸にもう一度! 命果てるまで愛す…) | | June 14, 1995 | 17.6% |
| 10 | (永遠の愛! 記憶が蘇るとき…命が消える) | | June 28, 1995 | 21.8% |
| 11 | (愛の復活! 熱く強く今だけを抱きしめて) | | July 5, 1995 | 17.5% |
| 12 | (愛のために死す! 愛とは、決して後悔しないこと…) | | July 12, 1995 | 23.9% |
Average rating 14.8% - Rating is based on Japanese Video Research (Kantō region).

Heaven's Coin: Part 2

| Episode | Title | Directed by | Original airdate | Rating |
|---|---|---|---|---|
| 1 | (永遠の愛ふたたび…彩、僕の瞳に星がうつるか?輝く蒼い星が) | | October 9, 1996 | 24.0% |
| 2 | (絶対に許されぬ愛…お前ら最低の人間だ) | | October 16, 1996 | 23.6% |
| 3 | (神様が私を試している…愛と裏切りの涙) | | October 23, 1996 | 19.9% |
| 4 | (運命の別れ…一生分の幸せをありがとう) | | October 30, 1996 | 20.2% |
| 5 | (暴かれた愛の真実…もう一人の兄弟の罠) | | November 6, 1996 | 21.8% |
| 6 | (涙が枯れた最後の嘘 さよなら…愛する人) | | November 13, 1996 | 20.9% |
| 7 | (君を抱きしめたままそっと僕は死にたい) | | November 20, 1996 | 19.1% |
| 8 | (実母の自殺…彩さん拓巳の事をお願いね) | | November 27, 1996 | 19.2% |
| 9 | (女の愛が男を立ち直らせる…奇跡の復活) | | December 4, 1996 | 21.7% |
| 10 | (衝撃の失明!愛する人をもう見られない) | | December 11, 1996 | 23.5% |
| 11 | (残された限りある時 二人が結ばれた夜に) | | December 18, 1996 | 22.7% |
| 12 | (満天の星空から一枚の金貨が地上に降りた 奇跡は起き愛は永遠を約束された) | | December 25, 1996 | 26.4% |
Average rating 22.2% - Rating is based on Japanese Video Research (Kantō region).

Heaven's Coin: The Final

| Episode | Title | Directed by | Original airdate | Rating |
|---|---|---|---|---|
| 1 | (星の金貨 完結編スペシャル) | | April 2, 1997 | 21.0% |

Heaven's Coin: Part 3

| Episode | Title | Directed by | Original airdate | Rating |
|---|---|---|---|---|
| 1 | (神話は南の海から…ろうあの少女の激しくせつない純粋愛) | | April 25, 2001 | 17.6% |
| 2 | (愛のための自殺未遂) | | May 2, 2001 | 16.4% |
| 3 | (シャボン玉の恋人…) | | May 9, 2001 | 13.4% |
| 4 | (突然のプロポーズ…母に言えない理由) | | May 16, 2001 | 14.8% |
| 5 | (禁断の告白…二人の愛に揺れて) | | May 23, 2001 | 14.9% |
| 6 | (別れの観覧車…破局した二人) | | May 30, 2001 | 13.3% |
| 7 | (運命の事故…あの人はもう帰らない…) | | June 6, 2001 | 14.6% |
| 8 | (最後の告白…星金シリーズ完結に迫る!) | | June 13, 2001 | 12.1% |
| 9 | (生命装置切断…母が見捨てた命) | | June 29, 2001 | 12.9% |
| 10 | (愛を信じて走れ! 緊急大手術…植物状態の悲しい約束) | | June 27, 2001 | 16.9% |
Average rating 14.7% - Rating is based on Japanese Video Research (Kantō region).

== Accolades ==
| Year | Award | Category | Recipient(s) | Result | Ref. |
|---|---|---|---|---|---|
| 1996 | 5th TV Life Annual Drama Awards | Best Actress | Noriko Sakai | Won | |
| 1996 | 5th TV Life Annual Drama Awards | Best Newcomer | Yutaka Takenouchi | Won | |
