= Awake (Wands album) =

Studio album by Wands
- Released: October 27, 1999
- Recorded: 1997–1999
- Genres: J-pop; pop rock; post-punk; alternative rock
- Length: 46 minutes
- Label: B-Gram records
- Producer: CHOKAKU

Wands chronology
Wands Historical Best Album (1997)	Awake (1999)	Best of Wands History (2000)

Singles from Awake
- 1. "Sabitsuita Machine Gun de Ima o Uchinukō" Released: September 3, 1997; 2. "Brand New Love" Released: February 11, 1998; 3. "Ashita Moshi Kimi ga Kowaretemo" Released: June 10, 1998; 4. "Kyou, Nanika no Hazumi de Ikiteiru" Released: March 31, 1999

Awake is the third studio album by Japanese rock band Wands. The album was released with new members. The album includes all singles released by new members of Wands. The album was released on October 27, 1999 under B-Gram Records label. It reached #18 on the Oricon charts for its first week with 16,940 sold copies. The album charted for 3 weeks and sold 25,640 copies. It was the band's final release before their disbandment in 2000. Prior to their disbandment, they released a compilation album entitled Best of Wands History.

== Track listing ==
No.	Title	Lyrics	Music	Arranger(s)	Length
1.	"Awake"	Shinya Kimura	Issei Sugimoto	Wands	3:31
2.	"Brand New Love"	Izumi Sakai (Zard)	Masaaki Watanuki	Wands	5:04
3.	"Kumo ga Nagareru Kata he" (雲が流れる方へ)	Issei Sugimoto	Issei Sugimoto; Shinya Kimura	Wands	4:17
4.	"With you ~living in my heart~"	Shinya Kimura	Shinya Kimura	Wands	4:57
5.	"Silence"	Jirou Kazuhisa	Shinya Kimura	Wands	3:42
6.	"Kyou, Nanika no Hazumi de Ikiteiru" (「今日、ナニカノハズミデ生きている」)	Nana Azuki (Garnet Crow)	Makoto Miyoshi (Rumania Montevideo)	Wands	3:42
7.	"BLACK or WHITE"	Issei Sugimoto	Shinya Kimura	Wands	4:04
8.	"Time washed away"	Jirou Kazuhisa	Shinya Kimura	Wands	2:22
9.	"Ashita Moshi Kimi ga Kowaretemo" (明日もし君が壊れても)	Izumi Sakai	Aika Ohno	Wands	4:16
10.	"Still in love"	Shinya Kimura	Shinya Kimura; Issei Sugimoto	Wands	3:31
11.	"Please tell me Jesus"	Jirou Kazuhisa	Keiko Utoku	Wands	3:49
12.	"Sabitsuita Machine Gun de Ima wo Uchinikou" (錆びついたマシンガンで今を撃ち抜こう)	Miho Komatsu	Miho Komatsu	Daisuke Ikeda	4:42
13.	"Where there's a will…"	Jirou Kazuhisa	Shinya Kimura	Wands	4:42

== Cover ==
- Zard later self-covered "Brand New Love" on their album Eien and "Ashita Moshi Kimi ga Kowaretemo" on Toki no Tsubasa.
- Miho Komatsu covered "Sabitsuita Machine Gun de Ima wo Uchinikou" on her debut album Nazo.
