= Wands (EP) =

EP by Wands
- Released: June 17, 1992
- Recorded: 1991–1992
- Genres: J-pop; pop rock
- Length: 27:54
- Label: B-Gram Records
- Producer: Daiko Nagato

Wands chronology
Wands (1992)	Toki no Tobira (1993)

Singles from Wands
- 1. "Sabishisa wa Aki no Iro" Released: December 4, 1991; 2. "Furimuite Dakishimete" Released: May 13, 1992

Wands is the debut EP by Japanese rock band Wands. The album was released on June 17, 1992 under B-Gram Records label.

== Background ==
The album includes two previously released singles, Sabishisa wa Aki no Iro and Furimuite Dakishimete. The composer of debut single, Seiichirou Kuribayashi later self-covered Wands debut single on his fifth studio album Awanakutemo I Love You. Fifteen years later, vocalist Show self-covered debut single on his cover album "Spoils".

== Promotion ==
Sabishisa wa Aki no Iro was used as an insert song for Japanese television drama series Hotel Women. Two weeks later after single release it was included in drama soundtrack before Wands debut album.

Furimuite Dakishimete was used as an opening theme for TV Asahi information program Oh! L Club.

== Commercial performance ==
It reached #10 rank on the Oricon Weekly charts with 4,910 sold copies. It charted for 37 weeks and sold over 349,420 copies. It was 48th best sold album in 1993.

== Track listing ==
All lyrics are written by Show Uesugi

No.	Title	Music	Arranger(s)	Length
1.	"Furimuite Dakishimete" (ふりむいて抱きしめて)	Kousuke Ohshima	Ohshima	4:04
2.	"Cloudy Sky"	Ohshima	Ohshima	4:26
3.	"Sabishisa wa Aki no Iro" (寂しさは秋の色)	Seiichiro Kuribayashi	Masao Akashi	4:44
4.	"Mou Jibun shika Aisenai" (もう 自分しか愛せない)	Ohshima	Ohshima	3:47
5.	"Good Sensation"	Ohshima, Hiroshi Shibasaki	Ohshima	4:53
6.	"Kono Yume Dake wo..." (この夢だけを…)	Ohshima	Ohshima	4:13
