= Marc Hoffman =

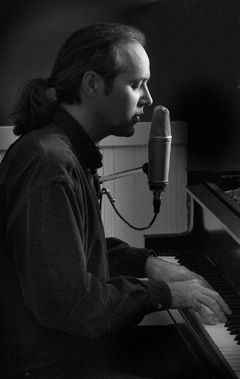
- Born: April 16, 1961 (age 65)
- Occupations: Composer, pianist, vocalist, recording artist, music educator
- Website: marchoffman.com

Marc Hoffman (born April 16, 1961) is a composer of concert music and music for film, pianist, vocalist, recording artist and music educator. Hoffman grew up in Salisbury, North Carolina, then attended the North Carolina School of the Arts and received a degree in composition.

He continued his education at The Dartington International Summer School of Music in Devon, England then studied film composition at the University of Southern California. He studied with David Ott, Sherwood Shaffer, Leo Arnaud and Neil Hefti. His film credits include researching period instruments and arrangements as music historian for the 1985 film Revolution, and scoring the 2006 film The Mill for Ralph Singleton, producer, and Grainger Hines, director. As music director for The Mill, he also placed the work of 13 other artists in the film.

Hoffman wrote concert music, music for theater, pop, Christian music and film composition until the early 1990s when he decided to focus his attention on jazz. He began writing original compositions, both instrumental and vocal, and creating his own arrangements of jazz standards. Under his own label, Virillion Music, he recorded “Long Way Home” in 2003, a collection of jazz-infused piano solos. In 2006 he recorded Christmas Time, jazz-inspired holiday collection of new works and new arrangements of traditional songs.

In early 2010, Hoffman released Curioso, a CD of all-original jazz. Session musicians include Tim Gordon on sax, John Sharp on guitar, Terry Peoples and Nathan Scott on bass, and Gray Fallin, Mike Lanier and Ryan Scott on percussion and drums.

Hoffman continues to write concert music, instrumental and vocal jazz pieces, film scores and background music for websites. His works have been performed across the U.S. and in the U.K., the Netherlands and France.

As a performer, Marc Hoffman works solo, with his trio, and with four- or five-piece bands. He performs at a variety of venues, from concert halls to jazz clubs and country clubs, from cafes and fine dining rooms to weddings. (He performed for former US President Gerald Ford’s family during Ford’s granddaughter’s wedding.) In addition to his original pieces, his repertoire as a singer and pianist includes his own arrangements of jazz standards and songs from the Great American Songbook, plus contemporary favorites.

Marc Hoffman also established and teaches at the Salisbury School of Music. A frequent lecturer, he presents a one-hour address called Music Is… that compares classical and pop music, and a brief history of film music and the mechanics of that art form entitled “On Film Music.” Marc is also an instructor of piano, composition, and voice at Bold Music in the Charlotte, NC area.

In 2007, Emerald Books published Hoffman's first book and companion DVD, Essential Worship Keyboard. In 2010 he will publish his second book and companion CD, Sleep Little Child, based on a lullaby he wrote.

Marc Hoffman is a member of the American Composers Forum and BMI. He lives in Salisbury, NC (near Charlotte) with his wife, Anne, and their daughter.
