= Version 5.0 =

Studio album by Wands
- Released: 30 August 2023
- Recorded: 2021–2023
- Genre: J-pop; pop rock
- Length: 48:40
- Label: D-Go
- Producer: Daiko Nagato

Wands chronology
Burn the Secret (2020)	Version 5.0 (2023)	Time Stew (2025)

Singles from Version 5.0
- 1. "Canaria Naita Koro ni" Released: 9 June 2021; 2. "Yura Yura" Released: 3 November 2021; 3. "Ai wo Sakebitai" Released: 23 August 2022; 4. "Sekai ga Owaru Made wa (Wands 5ki ver.)" Released: 28 August 2022; 5. "Raise Insight" Released: 17 May 2023

Music video
- "WANDS 「VERSION 5.0」全曲紹介" on YouTube

Version 5.0 is the seventh studio album by Japanese rock band Wands. It was released on 30 August 2023 under the D-Go label. It is the band's first new album in nearly three years, and also the second studio album for the fifth version of Wands with vocalist Daishi Uehara. The album consists of 10 original songs as well as three cover versions from the second and third Wands periods. Two of the original songs were composed and written by vocalist Daishi solely. Shibasaki confirmed that he re-mixed all of the single tracks for the album, with the exception of RAISE INSIGHT.

This album was released in three formats: regular CD edition, limited "A" version CD+Booklet and limited "B" version CD+Blu-ray edition. The CD+Blu-ray edition included a Blu-ray with five music videoclips: four from the original singles and one from the self cover.

On 26 April 2021, Kimura announced temporary hiatus from band activities as result of the weakening health and possible worries of being infected by COVID-19. Although he attended the album cover shoot and participated in the recording of the 2021 single "Canaria Naita Koro ni", the rest of the tracks Daishi and Hiroshi recorded the album on their own.

== Promotion ==
=== Singles ===
This album includes three previously released physical and two digital singles.

Single "Canaria Naita Koro ni" was released on 9 June 2021, as their first single to be released on that year and new music material for the first time since release of the album Burn the Secret. It has become the last single in which Kimura took recording session before temporary hiatus. He did not make appearance on the music videoclip. The song did not receive any promotional usage in the media. The single debuted at number 9 on the Oricon Weekly Single Charts.

Single "Yura Yura" was released on 3 November 2021, as their second single to be released on that year. The single served as an opening theme to the anime television series Detective Conan. It's the band's second song to be titled with Detective Conan animation series. The single debuted at number 9 on the Oricon Weekly Single Charts.

Single "Ai wo Sakebitai" was released digitally on 23 August 2022, as their first single to be released on that year and new material for the first time in 9 months. The singles served as a commercial song to the company "EM SYSTEMS", which starred actor Kento Hayashi. The single debuted at number 20 on the Oricon Weekly Digital Singles Chart and number 30 on the Billboard Japan Download Songs chart.

The cover version of "Sekai ga Owaru Made wa" was released digitally on 28 August 2022, one week after the previous single. The single received a music video. On the same day, the band members took part in the event session of 2022's Animelo Summer Live and together with Maki Ohguro from the same agency performed the song on the stage.

The single "Raise Insight" was released on 17 May 2023, the group's first single to be released that year. The single served as an opening theme to the anime television series Detective Conan. It's the band's third song to be titled with Detective Conan animation series. The single debuted at number 9 on the Oricon Weekly Single Charts.

=== Live tour ===
For the album promotion, the band announced their second live tour since reunion titled "Shout Out" with planned dates between 6 and 26 September 2023.

== Commercial performance ==
The album reached number six on the Oricon Weekly Albums Chart. The album debuted at number 7 on the Billboard Japan Hot Albums ranking.

== Track listing ==
Version 5.0 track listing
No.	Title	Lyrics	Music	Arranger(s)	Length
1.	"We Will Never Give Up"	Uehara Daishi	Hiroshi Shibazaki	Shibazaki	4:10
2.	"Get Chance Get Grow"	Daishi	Shibazaki	Shibazaki	4:18
3.	"Wonder Story"	Daishi	Daishi	Daishi	3:50
4.	"Raise Insight"	Uehara	Shibazaki	Shibazaki	3:18
5.	"Sora he Mukau Ki no Youni" (空へ向かう木のように)	Daishi	Shibazaki	Shibazaki	3:36
6.	"Kan'nō Sadistic ni Nurete" (官能SADISTICに濡れて)	Daishi	Shibazaki	Shibazaki	3:37
7.	"Shout Out!!!"	Daishi	Daishi	Daishi	1:14
8.	"Yura Yura"	Uesugi	Shibazaki	Shibazaki	4:11
9.	"Ai wo Sakebitai" (愛を叫びたい)	Uehara	Shibazaki	Shibazaki	4:14
10.	"Canaria Naita Koro ni" (カナリア鳴いた頃に)	Uehara	Shibazaki	Shibazaki	3:51
11.	"Sekai ga Owaru Madewa" (世界が終るまでは; Wands Version 5.0 version)	Uesugi Show	Oda Tetsuro	Shibazaki	5:14
12.	"Million Miles Away" (Wands Version 5.0 version)	Uesugi	Shinya Kimura	Shibazaki	4:45
Total length:					45:54

Regular Edition of CD only
No.	Title	Lyrics	Music	Length
1.	"Arifureta Kotoba de [Acoustic Version 5.0]" (ありふれた言葉で; [Acoustic Version 5.0])	Uesugi	Shibazaki

== Charts ==
Chart performance for Version 5.0
Chart (2023)	Peak position
Japanese Albums (Oricon)	6
Japanese Hot Albums (Billboard Japan)	7
