= Time Stew =

Studio album by Wands
- Released: 26 March 2025
- Recorded: 2024–2025
- Genres: J-pop; pop rock
- Length: 28:02
- Label: D-Go
- Producer: Daiko Nagato

Wands chronology
Version 5.0 (2023)	Time Stew (2025)

Singles from Version 5.0
- 1. "Daitan" Released: 5 January 2024 (digitally) 10 April 2024 (physically); 2. "Shooting Star" Released: 4 January 2025 (digitally) 22 January 2025 (physically)

Music video
- "WANDS 「TIME STEW」全曲紹介" on YouTube

Time Stew is the eighth studio album by Japanese rock band Wands. It was released on 26 March 2025 under the D-Go label. It is the band's first new album in nearly two years, and also the third studio album for the fifth version of Wands with vocalist Daishi Uehara. The album consists of 4 original songs as well as two cover versions from the second Wands period. All the original songs were written and remixed by Shibazaki himself. The album was released on the same day as their home-video release Wands Live Tour 2024: Bold.

This album was issued in three formats: regular CD edition, limited "A" version CD+Blu-ray and limited "B" version 2CD edition. The CD+Blu-ray edition included a Blu-ray with live performance of live event "Japan Anison & Rock Festival 2024" and the 2CD edition includes live recordings of fan-club live event "Wander-Land Neo「Fands」Meeting 2023".

== Promotion ==
=== Singles ===
This album includes two previously released physical and two digital singles.

Single "Daitan" was released at first as a digital single on 5 January 2024 and later as a physical single on 10 April on the same year. It served as theme song to the special movie edition of Detective Conan vs Kaito Kid. Daishi revealed that the song was written with the theme of "Kaitou Kid". The digital version of the single debuted at number 15 on the Weekly Billboard Japan Download Songs and number 32 on the Oricon Digital single ranking. The physical version of the single debuted at number 5 on the Oricon Weekly Single Charts and stayed at number 29 on the Oricon Monthly Single Charts. Second track from the single, "Honey" was excluded from the album release.

Single "Shooting star" was released as digital single on January 4, 2025 and as CD single on January 22, 2025. The single served as an 72nd ending theme to the anime television series Detective Conan. It's the band's fourth song to be titled with Detective Conan animation series. The digital version of the single debuted at number 11 on Billboard Japan's Weekly Top Singles Sales rankings and number 43 on Weekly Top Download Songs rankings. The physical version of the single debuted at number 5 on the Oricon Weekly Single Charts at number 8 on the Oricon Weekly Single Charts and stayed at number 34 on the Oricon Monthly Single Charts.

=== Live tour ===
For the album promotion, the band announced their third live tour titled "Time Stew" with planned dates between 18 April and 21 May 2025.

== Commercial performance ==
The album reached number eight on the Oricon Daily Albums Chart.

== Track listing ==
Time Stew track listing
No.	Title	Lyrics	Music	Arranger(s)	Length
1.	"Daitan" (大胆)	Uehara Daishi	Hiroshi Shibazaki	Shibazaki	4:04
2.	"Tenshi ni nante Narenakatta" (天使になんてなれなかった)	Uesugi Show	Shibazaki	Shibazaki	5:02
3.	"Shooting Star"	Uehara	Shibazaki	Shibazaki	4:48
4.	"We All Need Love"	Uehara	Shibazaki	Shibazaki	4:24
5.	"Flower"	Uesugi	Sbibazaki	Shibazaki	5:05
6.	"Refrain" (リフレイン)	Uehara	Shibazaki	Shibazaki	4:39
Total length:					28:02

== Charts ==
=== Weekly charts ===
Weekly chart performance for Time Stew
Chart (2025)	Peak position
Japanese Albums (Oricon)	11
Japanese Combined Albums (Oricon)	12
Japanese Rock Albums (Oricon)	3
Japanese Download Albums (Billboard Japan)	13
Japanese Top Albums Sales (Billboard Japan)	12

=== Monthly charts ===
Monthly chart performance for Time Stew
Chart (2025)	Position
Japanese Albums (Oricon)	45
Japanese Rock Albums (Oricon)	5

== Release history ==
Year	Format(s)	Serial number	Label(s)	Ref.
2025	CD; 2CD; CD+BD digital streaming	GZCD-5019; GZCD-5018; GZCD-5017	D-Go	
