= University of Creation; Art, Music & Social Work =

Coordinates: 36.318562°N 138.989722°E

- 創造学園大学
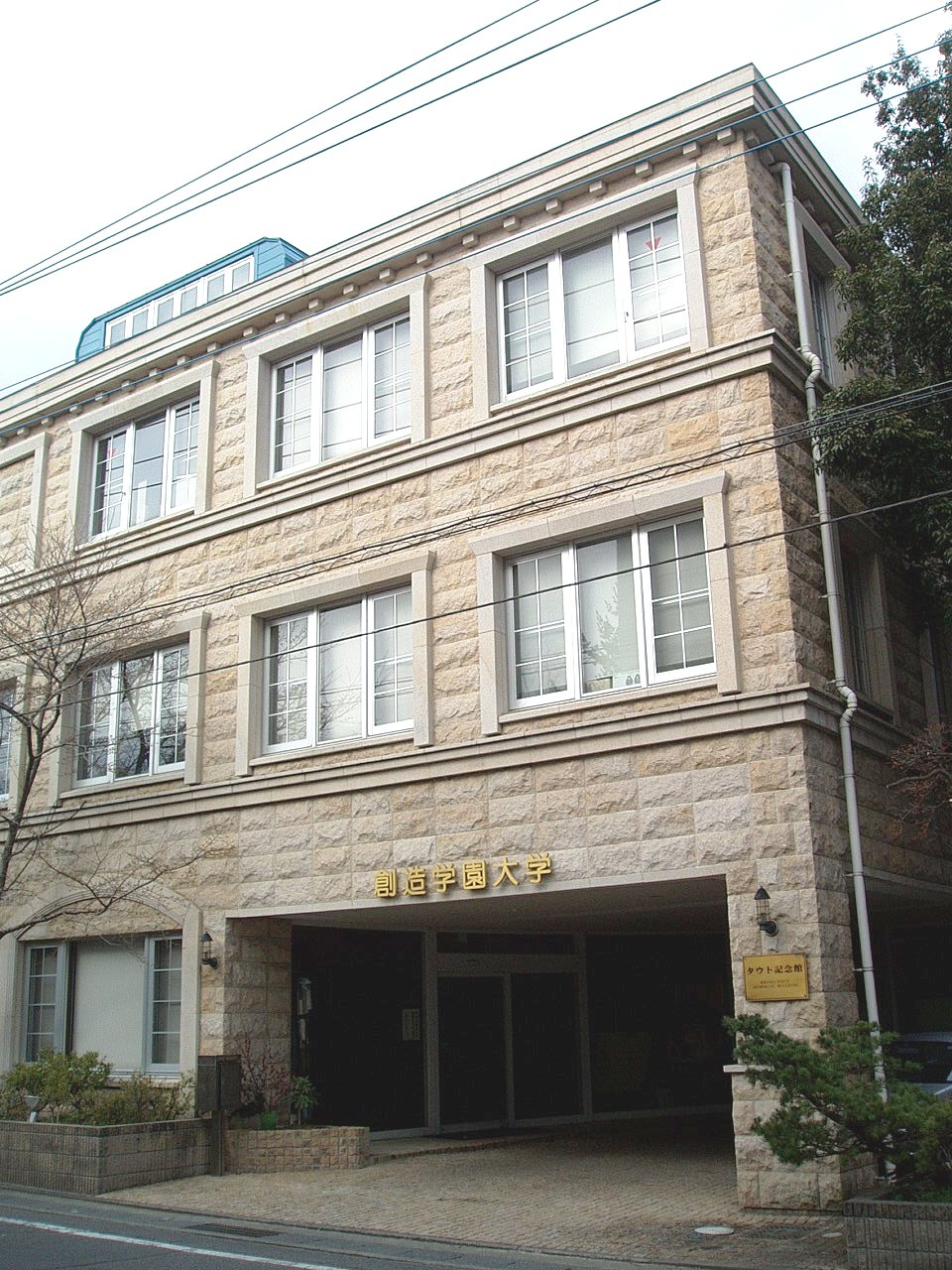
- Former Yachiyo Campus building
- Type: Private
- Active: 2004–March 2013
- President: Daitetsu Koike
- Location: Takasaki, Gunma Prefecture, Japan
- Campus: Nakayama / Yachiyo
- Website: web.archive.org/*/https://souzou.ac.jp

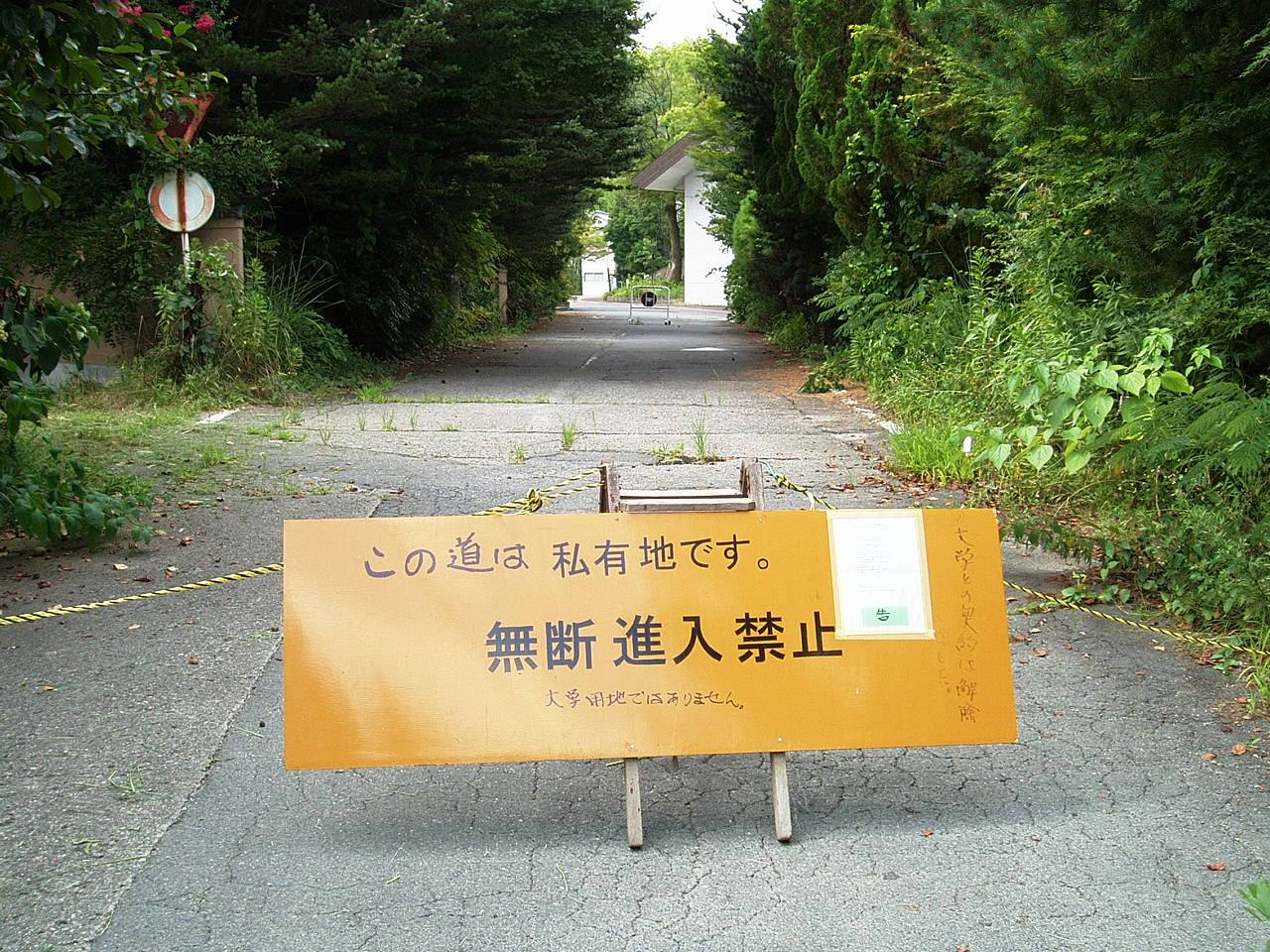
Entrance to the former Nakayama Campus in 2012, with a no-entry sign erected by the land owner

The University of Creation; Art, Music & Social Work (創造学園大学, Sōzō Gakuen Daigaku), sometimes called Souzou Gakuen University was a private university in Takasaki, Gunma, Japan, established in 2004. The president of the school was Daitetsu Koike.

On 28 March 2013, the university was ordered to close by the Ministry of Education, Culture, Sports, Science and Technology for violating the Private Schools Act.

== Campuses ==
The university had two campuses:

=== Nakayama campus ===
Housed the Creative Arts Department.

Location: 2229 Iwasaki, Yoshii-machi, Tano-gun, Gunma-ken

=== Yachiyo campus ===
Housed the Social Work Department.

Location: 2-3-6 Yachiyo-machi, Takasaki-shi, Gunma-ken
