= Aoi Usagi =

1995 single by Noriko Sakai

Single by Noriko Sakai

from the album Watercolour
- Language: Japanese
- English title: Blue Rabbit
- B-side: "Eien no Asa"
- Released: May 10, 1995
- Recorded: 1995
- Genre: J-pop
- Label: Victor
- Composer(s): Tetsurō Oda
- Lyricist(s): Emi Makiho

Noriko Sakai singles chronology
"Oh Oh Oh (We Are the Winners)" (1995)	"Aoi Usagi" (1995)	"Here I Am (Nakitai Toki wa Nakeba Ii)" (1996)

Music videos
- "Aoi Usagi" on YouTube

"Aoi Usagi" (碧いうさぎ, lit. "Blue Rabbit") is the 27th single by Japanese entertainer Noriko Sakai. Written by Emi Makiho and Tetsurō Oda, the single was released on May 10, 1995, by Victor Entertainment.

== Background and release ==
"Aoi Usagi" was used as the opening theme of the NTV drama series Heaven's Coin, which also starred Sakai. According to lyricist Makiho, she won a competition to write lyrics for Oda's composition to match the Grimms' Fairy Tales-influenced theme of the drama.

"Aoi Usagi" peaked at No. 5 on Oricon's singles chart. It sold over 997,000 copies and was certified Double Platinum by the RIAJ, becoming the biggest-selling single in her career. The song was also ranked No. 1 downloaded song on the iTunes Store in 2009 before her drug scandal with her then-husband Yūichi Takasō prompted Victor to withdraw all of her media from stores.

The music video features Sakai performing Japanese Sign Language while singing the song, as she played a deaf and mute girl in Hoshi no Kinka. She did a similar performance on the 46th Kōhaku Uta Gassen in 1995, her first and only appearance on NHK's New Year's Eve special.

Makiho self-covered the song on her 1996 album Aromatister while Oda covered it on his 2006 cover album Melodies. Sakai re-recorded the song as the B-side of her 2007 single "Sekaijū no Dare Yori Kitto". In 2014, Sakai recorded a Chinese-language version of the song, titled "Jìmò de xiǎo bì tù" (寂寞的小碧兔); this version is included in her 2016 compilation album The Best Exhibition: Noriko Sakai 30th Anniversary Best Album. In October 2021, Sakai re-recorded the song and placed an NFT of it and promo photos on auction to promote the fourth season of the drama series Producer K, which marked her first drama appearance in eight years.

== Track listing ==
No.	Title	Lyrics	Music	Arrangement	Length
1.	"Aoi Usagi" ((碧いうさぎ, "Blue Rabbit"))	Emi Makiho	Tetsurō Oda	Hiroshi Shinkawa	3:48
2.	"Eien no Asa" ((永遠の朝, "Eternal Morning"))	Chika Ueda	Ueda	Etsuko Yamakawa	4:29
3.	"Aoi Usagi" (Original Karaoke)				3:47
4.	"Eien no Asa" (Original Karaoke)				4:27

== Charts ==
Chart (1995)	Peak position
Oricon Weekly Singles Chart	5

== Certification ==
Region	Certification	Certified units/sales
Japan (RIAJ)	2× Platinum	800,000^{^}
^{^} Shipments figures based on certification alone.

== Cover versions ==
- McKee covered the song in Tagalog as "Ako Ay Maghihintay" on their 1996 self-titled album, released exclusively in the Philippines.
- Marie Miyake (as Nana Abe) covered the song on the 2013 soundtrack album The IdolM@ster Cinderella Master Cute Jewelries! 001.
- Nanase Aikawa covered the song on the 2015 tribute album Treasure Box: Tetsurō Oda Songs.
