= Kagami no Dress =

1996 single by Noriko Sakai

Single by Noriko Sakai

from the album In Snowflakes
- Language: Japanese
- English title: Mirror Dress
- B-side: "Star Talk"
- Released: October 9, 1996
- Recorded: 1996
- Genre: J-pop
- Length: 3:59
- Label: Victor
- Composer(s): Kyōichi Usamoto
- Lyricist(s): Lala Miura

Noriko Sakai singles chronology
"Here I Am (Nakitai Toki wa Nakeba Ii)" (1996)	"Kagami no Dress" (1996)	"Namida-iro" (1997)

Music videos
- "Kagami no Dress" on YouTube

"Kagami no Dress" (鏡のドレス, Kagami no Doresu, lit. "Mirror Dress") is the 29th single by Japanese entertainer Noriko Sakai. Written by Lala Miura and Kyōichi Usamoto, the single was released on October 9, 1996, by Victor Entertainment.

== Background and release ==
"Kagami no Dress" was used as the opening theme of the NTV drama series Zoku Hoshi no Kinka, which also starred Sakai. The B-side, "Star Talk", is a duet with singer Kyōichi Usamoto.

"Kagami no Dress" peaked at No. 9 on Oricon's singles chart. It sold over 447,000 copies and was certified Platinum by the RIAJ, becoming the second biggest-selling single in her career.

== Track listing ==
All music is arranged by Takayuki Hijikata.

No.	Title	Lyrics	Music	Length
1.	"Kagami no Dress" (Kagami no Doresu (鏡のドレス, "Mirror Dress"))	Lala Miura	Kyōichi Usamoto	3:59
2.	"Star Talk"	Chikako Sawada	Sawada	4:13
3.	"Kagami no Dress" (Original Karaoke)			3:59
4.	"Star Talk" (Original Karaoke)			4:13
Total length:				16:24

== Charts ==
Chart (1996)	Peak position
Oricon Weekly Singles Chart	9

== Certification ==
Region	Certification	Certified units/sales
Japan (RIAJ)	Platinum	400,000^{^}
^{^} Shipments figures based on certification alone.
