= Burn the Secret =

Studio album by Wands
- Released: 28 October 2020
- Recorded: 2019–2020
- Genre: J-pop; pop rock
- Length: 48:40
- Label: D-Go
- Producer: Daiko Nagato

Wands chronology
Best of Wands History (2000)	Burn the Secret (2020)	Version 5.0 (2023)

Singles from Burn the Secret
- 1. "Makkana Lip" Released: January 29, 2020; 2. "Dakiyose Takamaru Kimi no Taion to Tomoni" Released: May 20, 2020; 3. "Secret Night 〜It's My Treat〜 (Wands 5ki ver.)" Released: September 9, 2020

Music video
- "WANDS 「BURN THE SECRET」全曲紹介" on YouTube

Burn the Secret is the sixth studio album by Japanese rock band Wands. It was released on 28 October 2020 under the D-Go label. It is the band's first new album in 21 years, and also the first studio album for the fifth version of Wands with vocalist Daishi Uehara. The album consists of original material as well as new versions of songs from the second and third Wands period.

This album was released in two formats: regular CD edition and limited CD+DVD edition. The CD+DVD edition included a DVD with three music videoclips: two from the original singles and one from the self cover.

== Promotion ==
=== Singles ===
This album consist of three previously released singles.

Single "Makka na Lip" was released on 29 January 2020. It became the band's first single to be released for 20 years. The single served as an opening theme to the anime television series Detective Conan. The single debuted at number 14 on the Oricon Weekly Single Charts and charted over 30 weeks.

Before the single's release, the song was performed on 18 November 2019 as a part of a surprise guest appearance at the Osaka music live event Onto, in which the day before they've announced the band resume of activities. Their entire performance has been streamed on the official YouTube channel of Being Inc.

Single "Dakiyose Takamaru Kimi no Taion to Tomoni" was released on 20 May 2020. The single served as a theme song to the BS TV Tokyo Corporation's Japanese television drama Silent Voice season 2. For the first time in 27 years it's the band's first theme song to be used in the television drama. The single debuted at number 3 on Oricon Weekly Single charts and charted 18 weeks.

The digital single "Secret Night 〜It's My Treat〜 (Wands 5ki ver.)" was released on the 9 September and served mainly as a promotion to the album. The single has received special videoclip shooting.

=== Live tour ===
The band announced their first live tour for the first time in 25 years on 20 May 2020 with dates between 7 and 26 October 2020; however, the original dates were canceled due to the COVID-19 pandemic's restrictions and changed into the digital paid livestream, which streamed on 31 October and 1 November 2020. The entire footage was scheduled to release on Blu-ray on 7 April 2021.

== Commercial performance ==
The album reached number four on the Oricon Weekly Album charts and charted for 12 weeks. The album debuted at number 4 on the Billboard Japan Weekly Album rankings.

== Track listing ==
No.	Title	Lyrics	Music	Arranger(s)	Length
1.	"David Boowie no Youni (David Bowieのように)" (leading track)	Uehara Daishi	Hiroshi Shibazaki	Shibazaki	3:52
2.	"Dakiyose Takamaru Kimi no Taion to Tomoni (抱き寄せ 高まる 君の体温と共に)" (17th single)	Daishi	Shibazaki	Shibazaki	4:00
3.	"Shōmi Kigengire I Love You (賞味期限切れ I love you)"	Daishi	Shibazaki	Shibazaki	3:53
4.	"Secret Night 〜It's My Treat〜 (Wands 5ki ver.)" (9th single's cover (from second Wands period))	Show Uesugi	Seiichiro Kuribayashi	Shibazaki	5:26
5.	"Burning Free"	Daishi	Shibazaki	Shibazaki	3:36
6.	"Makkana Lip 真っ赤なLip)" (16th single)	Daishi	Kousuke Ohshima	Ohshima	3:47
7.	"Ashita Moshi Kimi ga Kowaretemo Wands 5ki ver. (明日もし君が壊れても[WANDS 第5期ver.])" (14th single's cover (from third Wands period))	Izumi Sakai	Aika Ohno	Shibazaki	4:14
8.	"Motto Tsuyoku Dakishimetanara Wands 5ki Ver.(もっと強く抱きしめたなら [WANDS 第5期ver.])" (3rd single's cover (from second Wands period))	Uesugi	Yoshio Tatano	Shibazaki	4:58
9.	"Sekaijū no Dare Yori Kitto (Wands 5ki Ver.) (世界中の誰よりきっと [WANDS 第5期ver.])" (cover of collaborative single with Miho Nakayama)	Uesugi, Miho Nakayama	Tetsuro Oda	Shibazaki	4:01
10.	"I remember U (アイリメンバーU)"	Daishi	Daishi	Shibazaki	3:27
