= Noriko Sakai =

Japanese actress and singer (born 1971)

- 酒井 法子
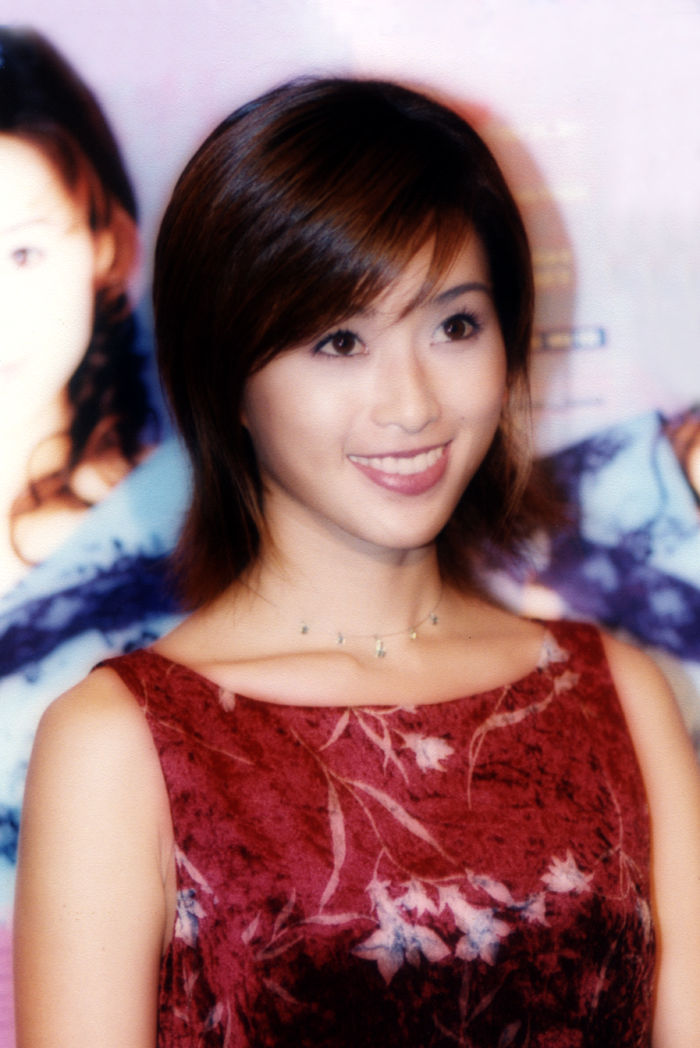
- Sakai in Hong Kong, during her Asia 1998 Work Out Fine tour
- Born: February 14, 1971 (age 55); Fukuoka, Fukuoka Prefecture, Japan
- Other name: Nori-P
- Education: University of Creation; Art, Music & Social Work
- Occupations: Singer; actress
- Years active: 1986–2009; 2012–present
- Agents: Sun Music (1986–2009) Office Nigun Niiba (2012–2021); Smile (2021–present)
- Height: 1.57 m (5 ft 2 in)
- Spouse: Yūichi Takasō (m. 1998; div. 2010)
- Children: 1 son
- Musical career
- Genres: J-pop
- Instrument: Vocals
- Labels: Victor Entertainment (1987–2009); Office Nigun Niiba (2012–2021); Smile (2021–present)
- Website: norikosakai.co.jp

Noriko Sakai (酒井 法子, Sakai Noriko; born February 14, 1971) is a Japanese singer and actress. Under her former stage name Nori-P (のりピー, Noripī), Sakai released her first single, "Otoko no Ko ni Naritai" (男のコになりたい; "I Want to Be a Boy") on February 5, 1987, nine days short of her sixteenth birthday. Over 40,000 copies of the single were sold. She is particularly popular in Hong Kong and Taiwan. Her best-selling single to date is "Aoi Usagi".

In August 2009, Sakai was arrested on suspicion of possession and abuse of drugs and sentenced to probation for three years. She divorced her husband Yūichi Takasō (高相 祐一, Takasō Yūichi) after the incident and temporarily stayed away from the media circle until her probation ended, at which she began rehearsals for the theater, and signed on with Office Nigun Niiba, as a first step towards returning to the media community. On May 1, 2021, she left Office Nigun Niiba and joined Smile.

== Early life and career ==
Noriko Sakai was born in Fukuoka, Fukuoka Prefecture, Japan. She made her debut as an idol singer in 1986.

Sakai released her first single, "Otoko no Ko ni Naritai" (男のコになりたい; "I Want to Be a Boy") on February 5, 1987, nine days short of her sixteenth birthday. Over 40,000 copies of the single were sold. In the early years of her career, she used the nickname Nori-P (のりピー), although around the mid-1990s she started to distance herself from it.

She ventured overseas in the 1990s to Taiwan to shoot VITALON P beverage commercials, as well as holding concerts which received praise.

Sakai held her first overseas tour in May 1992; she traveled to Taiwan and then returned a few months later for a second tour on October 31 and November 1. Sakai considered her last two singles of 1992—"Nagisa no Pitecan Trops" and "Tabun Taboo"—playful songs. She did not see a need for profound meaning and wanted them to be fun. Sakai felt vocal style for "Tabun Taboo" had matured and that the lyrcis reflected her age (21 years) at the time. In 1993, she had a main role in the television series Hitotsu Yane no Shita as Kashiwagi Koyuki. In 1995, she acted in Hoshi no Kinka (Heaven's Coins) as Aya Kuramoto, also singing the theme song "Aoi Usagi" (碧いうさぎ; "blue rabbit") which became her best selling album to date.

By the end of 1998 she organized the Asian concert tours throughout Taiwan, mainland China, Singapore, South Korea, Malaysia, Indonesia, Thailand and other countries in the regions.

=== Marriage, Motherhood & First Return ===
In a sudden press conference held on December 28, 1998, Sakai announced her marriage to Yūichi Takasō (高相 祐一, Takasō Yūichi). She and Yūichi have one son, born on July 17, 1999.

Sakai would return to the industry in January 2000, gradually taking on roles in movies, drama and advertising. In 2003, she starred in horror film Ju-On: The Grudge 2 as Kyoko Harase.

=== Drug scandal ===
On August 2, 2009, Sakai's reputation came into question when her husband, Yūichi Takasō allegedly inhaled a small amount of stimulant drugs in a public lavatory, at a park in Tokyo's Minato Ward. The next day, Takasō's car, parked on a street in Tokyo's Shibuya Ward, was searched, during which 0.817 grams of stimulant drugs were found. On August 4, 2009, Takasō was stopped by Tokyo Metropolitan Police while walking in public in Shibuya. When Takasō was subjected to a body search, stimulant drugs were reportedly found in his underwear. Takasō was immediately arrested, and Sakai was summoned by police for questioning and drug testing. She initially declined, telling police she had to pick her 10-year-old son up, and would go to the police station later that day. However, Sakai later disappeared with her son.

While Takasō was being questioned at the police department, he reportedly told the police he and Sakai had been using drugs while on a family trip ten day sprior to Amami Ōshima in Kagoshima Prefecture. At the time of Takasō's arrest, Sakai was living in her own apartment in Tokyo. While Sakai was away, the police searched Sakai's home, and reportedly found 0.008 grams of stimulant drugs wrapped in aluminum foil, as well as an inhaler, which tested positive for Sakai's DNA. As a result, a warrant was issued for her arrest. On August 5, 2009, Sakai dropped her son off with an unnamed friend, purchased some underwear and other necessities from a store, and then disappeared.

Attempting to track Sakai down by cell phone, the police reported that her cell phone lost signal within the area of Yamanashi Prefecture, about 60 miles (100 kilometers) west of Tokyo. Sakai later claimed that the cell phone was damaged, and that she threw the phone away. The police believed that the cell phone may have contained information leading to the source of the stimulant drugs.

On August 7, 2009, Sakai voluntarily turned herself in to the authorities, and was placed under arrest, charged with "suspicion of possessing stimulant drugs," according to a Tokyo police official. She admitted to the drugs being in her apartment, saying she kept the drugs in foil "to use them later", despite admitting she did not take any of the drugs herself.

On August 17, 2009, a beach house in Katsuura, Chiba was also searched. A frequent location for both Sakai and Takasō the past five years, 0.097 grams of amphetamines and paraphernalia were found in the house. On August 21, 2009, after admitting to the drugs found in the beach house, Takasō was served with a second charge for possession of stimulant drugs.

==== Drug testing and indictment ====
On August 9, 2009 – two days after Sakai's arrest, a urine test result came up negative, as light use of methamphetamine can only be detected in a urine test within one to four days after use. However, on August 19, 2009, investigators announced that Sakai's hair tested positive for the stimulant drug, despite a weak result, extending her jail time to August 28, 2009. Before Sakai was caught, she reportedly dyed and cut her hair; both practices would affect the testing results.

On the final day of Sakai's detention, prosecutors officially indicted Sakai for amphetamine possession, upon revelation that Sakai allegedly used amphetamines at a hotel during her Kagoshima Prefecture visit with her husband and son. The fact that the drugs were carefully wrapped for later use was a deciding factor in the verdict.

Sakai was released after posting bail on September 17, 2009. Accompanied by her attorney, and with Sun Music Vice President Masahisa Aizawa in attendance, she apologized to the public during a press conference. "My weakness caused me to give in to illegal drugs and caused grief to many people. I pledge to repent and atone for this crime for the rest of my life," she said. Sakai subsequently checked into a hospital to overcome her drug habit, and asked for the media's restraint during her recovery.

Sakai's first court date was held on October 26, 2009 – drawing a crowd of 6,600 people outside of a Tokyo courthouse. Sakai pleaded guilty to drug use. Prosecutors suggested eighteen months in prison for Sakai, but on November 9, 2009, the court delayed the jail term to November 9, 2012, as long as she stays crime-free. During her recovery, Sakai attended the University of Creation; Art, Music & Social Work in Takasaki, Gunma, where she received her degree in welfare and nursing care in March 2013.

==== Reactions & Divorce ====
The drug scandal cost Sakai billions of yen in canceled contracts and other endeavors she was involved in prior. On August 6, 2009, car manufacturer Toyota reportedly stopped showing a commercial, featuring Sakai, on its web site. Sakai's clothing line "PP rikorino", consisting of over 150 items were pulled from stores throughout Japan.

During the first week of the scandal, Apple Inc's iTunes Store rated Sakai's 1995 song "Aoi Usagi" the number one downloaded song, based on an eleven-day period. Other Sakai songs among the top 100 downloads include Kagami no Doresu (17th) and Sekaijū no Dare Yori Kitto (18th). However, on August 9, 2009, Victor Entertainment, the distributor of Sakai's works, withdrew Sakai's CDs from stores, and suspended downloads of her songs. Online stores such as Amazon Japan still sold Sakai's CDs and DVDs, despite increasing the selling prices as a result of Victor's move. In more recent years Victor Entertainment has reversed its decision and redistributed her work.

Immediately after the indictment announcement, Sun Music, the talent agency who has represented Sakai since 1986, suspended her contract and removed her official website from its server. The agency's president Masahisa Aizawa said, "We apologize from the bottom of our hearts for the alleged misdeeds of Ms. Sakai." Soon after Aizawa's announcement, he was demoted to vice-president. Chairman Hideyoshi Aizawa removed himself from the position, and is now an adviser to Sun Music, with no right to represent the firm.

In the aftermath of the scandal, Sakai divorced her husband Takasō on July 31, 2010.

=== Second return to the entertainment industry ===
In April 2011, Sakai participated in a tour around Beijing to educate the hazards of drug addiction. She claimed that she would temporarily set aside her entertainment career to partake in charity organizations.

At a news conference on November 24, 2012, Sakai announced her return to the entertainment industry, after finishing her suspended sentence that ended earlier Friday. Sakai also signed on with talent agency Office Nigun Niiba. She returned to the stage in December 2012 as the main character in a story about the Sengoku period, ending December 25, 2012. In all, 7,500 people attended the stage performance during the ten-day period.

In October 2021, Sakai re-recorded "Aoi Usagi" and placed an NFT of it and promo photos on auction to promote the fourth season of the drama series Producer K, which marked her first drama appearance in eight years.

== Filmography ==
=== Film ===
- Pikachu and Pichu, 2000
- Ju-on: The Grudge 2, 2003
- Yogen, 2004
- SS, 2008
- Utsusemi no Mori, 2021

=== Television dramas ===
- Tobu ga Gotoku as Saigō Koto, NHK 1990
- Under the Same Roof as Kashiwagi Koyuki, Fuji TV 1993
- Longing For The Old You, NTV 1994
- Watashi, Mikata Desu, TBS 1995
- Hoshi no Kinka (Heaven's Coins) as Aya Kuramoto, NTV 1995
- Zoku Hoshi no Kinka (Heaven's Coins 2) as Aya Kuramoto, NTV 1996
- Hitotsu Yane no Shita 2 as Koyuki Kashiwagi, Fuji TV 1997
- Seija no Koushin, TBS 1999
- Toi Shinseki Chikaku no Tanin, NHK 1999
- Tenshi ga Kieta Machi, NTV 2000
- Honke no Yome, NTV 2001
- Toshiie and Matsu as One, NHK 2002
- Mukodono 2003, Fuji TV 2003
- Fight as Kido Ayako, NHK 2005
- Marumaru Chibi Maruko-chan as Okaasan, Fuji TV 2007

=== Kōhaku Uta Gassen appearances ===
| Year / Broadcast | Appearance | Song | Appearance order | Opponent |
|---|---|---|---|---|
| 1995 (Heisei 7) / 46th | Debut | "Aoi Usagi" | 1/25 | Sharam Q |

== Bibliography ==
=== Photo books ===
- Let's Nori-P
- Shuffle Heart
- Blue Pearl
- Aquarius
- Zephoros
- In Europe
- In Greece
- Comme Le Cinema
- Shinin Run
- Orange Hotel
- Naturelle
- Fizz

== Other ==
- Kagami no Kuni no Legend (鏡の国のレジェンド) (video game for the PC Engine CD add-on)
