= Toki no Tobira =

Studio album by Wands
- Released: April 17, 1993
- Recorded: 1992–1993
- Genre: J-pop; pop rock
- Length: 42:56
- Language: Japanese
- Label: B-Gram records
- Producer: Daiko Nagato

Wands chronology
Wands (1992)	Toki no Tobira (1993)	Little Bit… (1993)

Singles from Toki no Tobira
- 1. "Motto Tsuyoku Kimi wo Dakishimetara" Released: July 1, 1992; 2. "Sekaijū no Dare Yori Kitto" Released: October 28, 1992; 3. "Toki no Tobira" Released: February 26, 1993

Toki no Tobira (時の扉, lit. The Door of Time) is the first full-length studio album by Japanese rock band Wands, released by B-Gram Records on April 17, 1993. It features the No. 1 singles "Toki no Tobira", "Motto Tsuyoku Kimi wo Dakishimetara", and "Sekaijū no Dare Yori Kitto", the latter co-written by Miho Nakayama. Also included is the band's version of the Deen song "Kono Mama Kimi Dake wo Ubaisaritai".

The album became the band's first No. 1 on Oricon's weekly albums chart, selling 410,930 copies on its first week. It charted for 33 weeks and sold 1,626,350 copies. By February 1994, the album was certified as a 2 Million seller by the RIAJ.

== Track listing ==
All lyrics are written by Show Wesugi, expect where indicated.

CD
No.	Title	Lyrics	Music	Arrangement	Length
1.	"Toki no Tobira" ((時の扉, "The Door of Time"))		Kousuke Ohshima	Masao Akashi	4:09
2.	"Kono Mama Kimi Dake wo Ubaisaritai" ((このまま君だけを奪い去りたい, "I Just Want to Take You Away"))		Tetsurō Oda	Takeshi Hayama	4:41
3.	"Hoshi no nai Sora no Shita de" ((星のない空の下で, "Under the Starless Sky"))		Hiroshi Shibasaki	Wands	4:46
4.	"Motto Tsuyoku Kimi wo Dakishimetara" ((もっと強く抱きしめたなら, "If You Hold Me Tightly"))		Yoshio Tatano	Hayama	4:55
5.	"Glass no Kokoro de" ((ガラスの心で, "With a Heart of Glass"))		Shibasaki	Akashi	3:59
6.	"Sono Mama Kimi he to..." ((そのままの君へと…, "To You As It Is..."))		Ohshima	Akashi	5:03
7.	"Kodoku e no Target" ((孤独へのTARGET, "Target to Loneliness"))		Daria Kawashima	Akashi	4:36
8.	"Mr.Jail"		Shibasaki	Hayama	3:58
9.	"Keep My Rock'n Road"		Show Wesugi	Hayama	2:19
10.	"Sekaijū no Dare Yori Kitto (Album Ver.)" ((世界中の誰よりきっと~Album Ver.~, "Surely More Than Anyone in the World"))	Wesugi; Miho Nakayama	Oda	Akashi	4:29

== Charts ==
Weekly charts

Chart (1993)	Peak position
Japanese Albums (Oricon)	1

Year-end charts

Chart (1993)	Peak position
Japanese Albums (Oricon)	4

== Certification ==
Region	Certification	Certified units/sales
Japan (RIAJ)	2× Million	2,000,000^{^}
^{^} Shipments figures based on certification alone.
