= Piece of My Soul (Wands album) =

Studio album by Wands
- Released: April 24, 1995
- Recorded: 1993–1995
- Genres: Alternative rock; power pop
- Length: 46 minutes
- Label: B-Gram records
- Producer: CHOKAKU

Wands chronology
Little Bit… (1993)	Piece of My Soul (1995)	Singles Collection +6 (1996)

Singles from Little Bit…
- 1. "Jumpin' Jack Boy" Released: November 17, 1993; 2. "Sekai ga Owaru Made wa" Released: June 8, 1994; 3. "Secret Night ~It's My Treat~" Released: February 13, 1995

Piece of My Soul is the second studio album by Japanese rock band Wands.

== Background and recording ==
WANDS began working on their third studio album in June 1994 and concluded in February 1995, with "Dont Try So Hard" being the final song recorded. According to vocalist Sho Uesugi, much of the album originated from home demos he had recorded prior to entering the studio. Using a sequencer, he programmed the drum parts in real time and recorded guitar and bass in his apartment despite limited soundproofing. Although initially unfamiliar with sequencing, Uesugi later said the demos became the foundation of the album's musical direction, and credited the band and production staff for preserving much of their original production in the finished recordings.

The recording session were physically demanding. Uesugi recalled spending up to twelve consecutive hours arranging songs and sleeping only around three hours per night while the album was being completed. He mentioned he devoted nearly all of his time to the project, rarely taking breaks outside music and instead continually listening to recordings and refining ideas. During production, he cited Beck, Hole and the Beatles, particularly "Strawberry Fields Forever", among the artists he had been listening to.

Uesugi described the process as highly meticulous, recalling disagreements over vocal takes because he was unwilling to compromise on performances he believed could be improved. He explained that, because the recordings would remain permanently documented, he preferred recording vocals rather than accepting takes he considered unsatisfactory. He also revealed that one song developed from an unfinished home demo after collaborating with guitarist Hiroshi Shibasaki, who added guitar parts to the recording.

The album includes ten tracks, containing the previously released singles "Sekai ga Owaru Made wa", "Jumpin' Jack Boy" and "Secret Night ~It's My Treat~". For the album, "Jumpin Jack Boy" was rearranged into a harder rock-oriented version than its original single release. During production, "Sasayaka na Aijou" and "Taiyo no Tameiki" were also considered for inclusion but were ultimately removed from the final track listing.

== Composition ==
Uesugi described Piece of My Soul as a significant turning point in his songwriting. He said the guiding principle during production was to avoid being influenced by expectations and evaluation by outsiders, believing that he "could not move on" artistically without making the album.

According to Uesugi, whereas many of his previous lyrics had been closer to diary entries, the songs on the album deliberately explored his flaws, insecurities and contradictions. He described the lyrics as acts of self-reflection rather than an autobiography, explaining that exposing both the positive and negative aspects of himself was necessary for his artistic development.

Discussing his artistic philosophy, Uesugi contrasted "idol" music with what he regarded as enduring artistic expression. He argued that popularity based on image was inherently short-lived, whereas music grounded in an honest portrayal of human nature possessed greater longevity. He said he wanted WANDS to pursue artistic authenticity rather than conform to outside expectations, believing that both the strengths and weaknesses of a person's character should be reflected in his songwriting.

One of the album's tracks, "Flower", was originally given the working title "Punk Rock o Kiinagara Milk o Nomu Rōba" (translated as "An Old Woman Drinking Milk While Listening to Punk Rock"). Uesugi later changed the title before release because he felt the original name was too surprising.

== Release and promotion ==
Piece of My Soul was released on 6 October 1995 by B-Gram Records. The album consists of ten tracks and includes the previously released singles, "Sekai ga Owaru Made wa", "Jumpin' Jack Boy" and "Secret Night ~It's My Treat~". Following its release, the omitted songs, "Sasayaka na Aijou" and "Taiyo no Tameiki" were issued on Vocal Compilation 90's Hits Vol.1 ~Male~ at the BEING studio and Best of Wands History respectively.

Piece of My Soul was the final studio album to feature the second lineup of WANDS led by vocalist Show Uesugi. Following the release of the compilation album, SINGLES COLLECTION+6, Uesugi and guitarist Hiroshi Shibasaki departed the band while keyboardist Kimura Shinya stayed and formed the third lineup of the group.

The band embarked on a nation wide tour in the promotion of the album, titled LIVE-JUNK #2 PIECE OF MY SOUL which began in Hokkaido on 14 April 1995 and concluded in Nakano City on 24 May 1995.

== Reception ==
The album reached #1 on the Oricon charts for its first week with 542,370 sold copies. It charted for 12 weeks and sold 963,460 copies.

== Track listing ==
All lyrics are written by Show Uesugi.

Piece of My Soul
No.	Title	Music	Arranger(s)	Length
1.	"Flower"	Hiroshi Shibasaki	Takeshi Hayama	5:14
2.	"Love & Hate"	Shibasaki	Hayama	4:19
3.	"Sekai ga Owaru Made wa" (世界が終るまでは…)	Tetsurō Oda	Hayama	5:17
4.	"Don't try so hard"	Hiroshi Shibasaki	Hayama	3:54
5.	"Crazy Cat"	Hiroshi Shibasaki	Hayamai	5:09
6.	"Secret Night -It's My Treat-"	Seiichiro Kuribayashi	Daisuke Ikeda	5:26
7.	"Foolish OK"	Shibasaki	Hayama	4:13
8.	"Piece of My Soul"	Shibasaki, Uesugi Show	Hayama	4:35
9.	"Jumpin' Jack Boy"	Kuribayashi	Hayama	3:50
10.	"Million Miles Away"	Shinya Kimura	Hayama	4:43
