= Little Bit... =

Little Bit…

EP by Wands
- Released: October 6, 1993
- Recorded: 1993
- Genre: J-pop; pop rock
- Length: 31 minutes
- Label: B-Gram Records
- Producer: WANDS

Wands chronology
Toki no Tobira (1993)	Little Bit… (1993)	Piece of My Soul (1995)

Singles from Little Bit…
- 1. "Ai wo Kataru yori Kuchizuke wo Kawasou" Released: April 17, 1993; 2. "Koiseyo Otome" Released: July 7, 1993

Little Bit… is the second EP by Japanese rock band Wands. The album includes two previously released singles, "Koiseyo Otome" and "Ai wo Kataru yori Kuchizuke wo Kawasou." The album was released on October 6, 1993 under B-Gram Records label. It reached #2 on the Oricon chart for first week, with 483,350 sold copies. It charted for 20 weeks and sold 951,660 copies.

== Track listing ==
All lyrics are written by Show Uesugi

No.	Title	Music	Arranger(s)	Length
1.	"Tenshi ni Nante Narenakatta" (天使になんてなれなかった)	Hiroshi Shibasaki	Takeshi Hayama	5:11
2.	"Koiseyo Otome" (恋せよ乙女)	Kousuke Ohshima	Takeshi Hayama	3:31
3.	"Don't Cry"	Daria Kawashima	Takeshi Hayama	4:55
4.	"Kimi ni Modorenai" (君にもどれない)	Hiroshi Shibasaki	Takeshi Hayama	3:29
5.	"Koe ni Narai Hodo ni Itoshii" (声にならないほどに愛しい, originally performed by "Manish")	Tetsurō Oda	Masao Akashi	4:18
6.	"Little Bit…"	Hiroshi Shibasaki	Takeshi Hayama	4:50
7.	"Ai wo Kataru yori Kuchizuke wo Kawasou" (愛を語るより口づけをかわそう)	Tetsurō Oda	Masao Akashi	4:29
