= Wands (band) =

Japanese rock band

- Origin: Japan
- Genres: Rock, pop rock, power pop, alternative rock, hard rock
- Years active: 1991–2000, 2019–
- Labels: Toshiba-EMI (1991–1993); B-Gram Records (1993–2000); Giza Studio (2019-)
- Members: Hiroshi Shibasaki (guitar, 1991–1997, 2019-); Shinya Kimura (keyboard, 1992–2000, 2019-); Daishi Uehara (vocal, 2019-)
- Past members: Show Wesugi (vocal, 1991–1997); Kousuke Oshima (keyboard, 1991–1992); Jiro Waku (vocal, 1997–2000); Issei Sugimoto (guitar, 1997–2000)
- Website: wands-official.jp

YouTube information
- Channel: Wands Official
- Years active: 2019 -
- Subscribers: 97.8 thousand
- Views: 50 million
- Last updated: August 16, 2024

Wands (ワンズ) (stylized as WANDS) is a Japanese rock band formed in 1991 and active until 2000 under the label B-Gram Records. In 2019, the band reunited with a new vocalist, Daishi Uehara, and two former members, Shibasaki and Kimura, under the D-Go recording label. In the span of 29 years, the band has had three lead vocalists and changed instrumental members five times.

== Members ==
=== Wesugi period ===
- Show Wesugi (上杉 昇, Uesugi Shō; born 24 May 1972) (1991-1996)- vocalist, lyricist, composer, arranger
- Kosuke Oshima (大島 こうすけ, Ōshima Kōsuke; Real and former stage name: Kosuke Oshima (大島 康祐, Ōshima Kōsuke), born 4 September 1970) (1991-1992)-keyboardist, composer, arranger
- Hiroshi Shibasaki (柴崎 浩, Shibasaki Hiroshi; born 13 December 1969) (1991-1996)-guitarist, composer, arranger
- Shinya Kimura (木村 真也, Kimura Shinya; born 28 July 1969) (1992-1996)-keyboardist, lyricist, composer, arranger

=== Waku period ===
- Jiro Matsumoto (松元 治郎, Matsumoto Jirō; Former stage name: Jiro Waku (和久 二郎, Waku Jirō), born 11 December 1970) (1997-2000)-vocalist, lyricist, arranger
- Issei "Suginho" Ambo (安保 "Suginho" 一生, Anbo Sugīnyo Issei; Real name: Issei Anbo (安保 一生, Anbo Issei), Former stage name: Issei Sugimoto (杉元 一生, Sugimoto Issei), born 8 May 1972) (1997-2000)-guitarist, lyricist, composer, arranger
- Shinya Kimura (木村 真也, Kimura Shinya; born 28 July 1969) (1992-2000)-keyboardist, lyricist, composer, arranger

=== Uehara period ===
- Daishi Uehara (上原 大史, Uehara Daishi) (2019-)- vocalist, lyricist
- Hiroshi Shibasaki (柴崎 浩, Shibasaki Hiroshi; born 13 December 1969) (1991-1996, 2019-)-guitarist, composer, arranger
- Shinya Kimura (木村 真也, Kimura Shinya; born 28 July 1969) (1992-2000, 2019-)-keyboardist, lyricist, composer, arranger

== Career ==
=== 1991–1996: Commercial success with Show Wesugi ===
The band was founded in 1991 by main vocalist Show Wesugi, guitarist Hiroshi Shibasaki, and keyboardist Kousuke Oshima. Wesugi was a fan of Axl Rose and Oshima was a guest member of Japanese rock band Loudness. The band was named after wands of tarot. They debuted with single "Sabishisa wa Aki no Iro (Loneliness is Autumn Color)". Their 1992 single "Motto Tsuyoku Dakishimeta Nara (If I Embrace You More Strongly)" reached #1 and was charted for 44 weeks on the Japanese Oricon charts.

In 1992, Shinya Kimura joined the band following Oshima's departure. Collaborating with Miho Nakayama, they released "Sekaijū no Dare Yori Kitto (Certainly More Than Everybody in the World)" in October 1992, which became one of the standard J-pop songs. That year, they took part in Kōhaku Uta Gassen, a famous year-end show in Japan, with this song.

Wesugi wrote Deen's debut song "Konomama Kimidake wo Ubaisaritai (Now, I Want to Make Off with Only You)", which sold over a million copies after its release in March 1993. In April, their album Toki no Tobira (Temporal Door) and single "Ai wo Kataru yori Kuchizuke wo Kawaso (Let's Kiss More Than Talking Love)" both reached #1 positions on the Oricon charts, making them the second artist to achieve this, following Seiko Matsuda. "Ai wo Kataru yori Kuchizuke wo Kawaso" remained #1 for four consecutive weeks. Toki no Tobira was charted for 33 weeks on the Oricon album charts. They sold over 4.11 million singles and 3.18 million albums in a year, winning the "Artist of the Year" award at the 8th Japan Gold Disc Award.

Their 1994 single "Sekai ga Owaru made wa... (Until the End of the World...)" reached #1 on Oricon charts, gaining over 1.2 million sales and was certified as a million-selling single by Recording Industry Association of Japan (RIAJ). It was the closing theme song of the anime series Slam Dunk. Wesugi loved grunge and wanted to turn into alternative rock. "Sekai ga Owaru made wa..." became the last song written in his former style because he felt that many musicians around him were doing the same thing. Their next single, "Secret Night (It's My Treat)," shifted to power pop and created controversies. Their 1995 studio album, Piece of My Soul, reached the #1 position on the Oricon charts, with sales of over 542,000 copies the first week.

Wesugi's image continued to change with the song "Same Side". His new style was said to be "painterly" and their new album was influenced by punk and blues, according to Wesugi. After the release of the single "Worst Crime (About a Rock Star who was a Swindler)" in February 1996, Wesugi and Shibasaki withdrew from the band and formed al.ni.co to pursue grunge. Their withdrawals were officially announced in 1997.

al.ni.co eventually disbanded on an unknown date in 2001. Wesugi went on a hiatus before continuing his solo music career and performed in the sixth anniversary of Hide's death in 2004. He also formed a rock band Nekodamashi with bassist Masahiro Miyazawa in 2006. Shibasaki formed rock band Abingdon Boys School with Takanori Nishikawa in 2005. Oshima also worked with Nishikawa on the 2006 album Under Cover.

=== 1997–2000: Third period with Jiro Waku ===
Shinya Kimura re-formed the group with vocalist Jiro Waku and guitarist Issei Sugimoto. Jiro Waku, whose real name is Jiro Matsumoto, was the first leader of twelve skateboarding boys (predecessor of SMAP) in Johnny & Associates. Their debut song, "Sabitsuita Machine Gun de Ima o Uchinukō", written by Miho Komatsu, was used as the end credits theme for Dragon Ball GT. Their next single, "Brand New Love", was written by Izumi Sakai. Sakai also wrote the song "Ashita moshi Kimi ga kowaretemo" (lit. "Even if you shatter tomorrow"), which was used as the closing theme for the first series of Yu-Gi-Oh! produced by Toei Animation. Their next single, "Kyo, Nanika no Hazumi de Ikiteiru" (lit. "Today, I live by some chance"), was written by Nana Azuki, a future member of Garnet Crow, and by Makoto Miyoshi, a future member of Rumania Montevideo. In an interview, Waku later explained that the band members were unsure why this particular song had been chosen when other strong options were available. However, they felt they were not in a position to challenge the decision, so they accepted it and proceeded with the release. As a result, the single performed worse than their previous single, selling only 15,000 copies and reaching 35th place on the Oricon weekly chart. The third period's first studio album, Awake, was released on 27 October 1999, but only charted for three weeks, peaking at #18 on the Oricon charts.

Due to poor sales for their single "Kyo, Nanika no Hazumi de Ikiteiru" and album Awake, paired with poor fan reception, Being Inc. decided to disband Wands in 2000. Years later, Waku states that he felt relieved when the agency told them the group would disband, facing constant pressure of replacing Wesugi.

=== 2019-present: Fourth and Fifth Wands period with Daishi Uehara ===
On 13 November 2019, the fifth period of Wands was announced with new vocalist, Daishi Uehara, along with former members Shibasaki and Kimura. On 17 November 2019, the band made their first stage appearance in 18 years at Dojima River Forum. In January 2020, their new original song, "Makka na Lip", was released under the Giza Studio record label. It was also the opening theme song of the anime television series Detective Conan.

On 16 February 2020, it was announced that a new single, "Daki Yose, Takamaru, Kimi no Taion to Tomoni", written by Shibasaki and Haibara, would be released in May. The announcement happened after a Special Live event. The single was promoted as the theme song of the Japanese television series Silent Voice. It is their first television drama theme song for the first time in 28 years.

In 2024, Uehara collaborated with the guitarist from the same music agency, Tak Matsumoto on the covers single "Toki no Sugiyuku Mama ni", which will be included in the kayokyoku cover's album The Hit Parade II.

== Discography ==
=== Studio albums ===
- Wands (1992)
- Toki no Tobira (1993)
- Little Bit… (1993)
- Piece of My Soul (1995)
- Awake (1999)
- Burn The Secret (2020)
- Version 5.0 (2023)
- Time Stew（2025)
