= Sekaijū no Dare Yori Kitto =

1992 single by Miho Nakayama and Wands

Single by Miho Nakayama & Wands

from the album Dramatic Songs
- Language: Japanese
- English title: Surely More Than Anyone in the World
- B-side: "Sekaijū no Dare Yori Kitto (Part II)"
- Released: October 28, 1992
- Recorded: 1992
- Genre: J-pop; pop rock
- Length: 4:08
- Label: King Records
- Composer: Tetsurō Oda
- Lyricists: Show Wesugi; Miho Nakayama
- Producers: Daiko Nagato; Norio Higuchi

Miho Nakayama singles chronology
"Mellow" (1992)	"Sekaijū no Dare Yori Kitto" (1992)	"Shiawase ni Naru Tame ni" (1993)

Wands singles chronology
"Motto Tsuyoku Dakishimeta nara" (1992)	"Sekaijū no Dare Yori Kitto" (1992)	"Toki no Tobira" (1993)

"Sekaijū no Dare Yori Kitto" (世界中の誰よりきっと; lit. "Surely More Than Anyone in the World") is a song by Japanese singer and actress Miho Nakayama and Japanese rock band Wands from her compilation album Dramatic Songs (1993). As Nakayama's 25th single overall, it was released on October 28, 1992 by King Records. She co-wrote the song with Show Wesugi and Tetsurō Oda, and produced by Daiko Nagato and Norio Higuchi.

== Background and release ==
"Sekaijū no Dare Yori Kitto" was co-produced by Daiko Nagato, who selected it from a stock of Tetsurō Oda's compositions. Takeshi Hayama gave it an 8-beat arrangement. The main single has Nakayama on lead vocals with Wands vocalist Show Wesugi on backing vocals. The song's B-side, "Sekaijū no Dare Yori Kitto (Part II)", was rearranged as a slow ballad with the vocal roles reversed.

The song was used as the theme song of the Fuji TV drama series Dare ka ga Kanojo wo Aishiteru (誰かが彼女を愛してる; Someone Loves Her), which also starred Nakayama. It was also used as a hold tone for a line of Sanyo cordless phones in 1995.

"Sekaijū no Dare Yori Kitto" peaked at number one on the Oricon weekly singles chart, simultaneously making it Nakayama's seventh song and Wands' second to reach such a spot. It sold over 1,833,000 copies and was certified Quadruple Platinum by the RIAJ, making it Nakayama's biggest-selling single of her career. The song was also certified Platinum in Download Sales by the RIAJ in December 2020.

Nakayama and Wands performed the song on the 43rd Kōhaku Uta Gassen in 1992.

== Wands version ==
Wands rerecorded the song on their 1993 album Toki no Tobira, with a rearrangement by Masao Akashi and backing vocals by Keiko Utoku. A live version of the song is included in the band's 2000 compilation album Best of Wands History. In 2020, the band with new vocalist Daishi Uehara self-covered the song as "Sekaijū no Dare Yori Kitto" (Wands 5th Period Ver.) (世界中の誰よりきっと [WANDS 第5期ver.]) on their fourth album Burn the Secret.

== Track listing ==
All lyrics are written by Show Wesugi and Miho Nakayama; all music is composed by Tetsurō Oda; all music is arranged by Takeshi Hayama.

8cm CD single
No.	Title	Length
1.	"Sekaijū no Dare Yori Kitto" ((世界中の誰よりきっと; "Surely More Than Anyone in the World"))	4:08
2.	"Sekaijū no Dare Yori Kitto (Part II)"	4:26
3.	"Sekaijū no Dare Yori Kitto" (Original Karaoke)	4:06

== Charts ==
Weekly charts

Chart (1992)	Peak position
Oricon Weekly Singles Chart	1

Year-end charts

Chart (1992)	Peak position
Oricon Year-End Chart	37

Chart (1993)	Peak position
Oricon Year-End Chart	10

== Certification ==
Region	Certification	Certified units/sales
Japan (RIAJ)	4× Platinum	1,833,000
Japan (RIAJ) Digital	Platinum	250,000^{*}
^{*} Sales figures based on certification alone.

== Awards ==
- 7th Japan Gold Disc Awards: Best 5 Single Award
- 12th JASRAC Awards: Gold Award

== Noriko Sakai version ==
"Sekaijū no Dare Yori Kitto"

Single by Noriko Sakai

from the album Daisuki: My Moments Best
- Language: Japanese
- English title: Surely More Than Anyone in the World
- B-side: "Aoi Usagi (2007 Version)"
- Released: August 22, 2007
- Recorded: 2007
- Genre: J-pop
- Length: 4:02
- Label: Victor
- Composer: Tetsurō Oda
- Lyricists: Show Wesugi; Miho Nakayama

Noriko Sakai singles chronology
"Tenka Muteki no Ai" (2004)	"Sekaijū no Dare Yori Kitto" (2007)

Music videos
- "Sekaijū no Dare Yori Kitto" on YouTube

Japanese singer and actress Noriko Sakai released her cover of "Sekaijū no Dare Yori Kitto" on August 22, 2007 by Victor Entertainment as her 36th single overall, taken from her compilation album Daisuki: My Moments Best (2007). The song was used in a series of Toyota Noah commercials that year. Its B-side is a rerecording of her song "Aoi Usagi" (1995), which was also composed by Oda. The single peaked at number 44 on the Oricon singles chart. This was her last single before she and her then-husband Yūichi Takasō were involved in a drug scandal in 2009.

=== Track listing ===
All music is composed by Tetsurō Oda and arranged by Takayuki Hijikata.

No.	Title	Lyrics	Length
1.	"Sekaijū no Dare Yori Kitto" ((世界中の誰よりきっと; "Surely More Than Anyone in the World"))	Show Wesugi; Miho Nakayama	4:02
2.	"Aoi Usagi (2007 Version)" ((碧いうさぎ [2007 Version]; "Blue Rabbit"))	Emi Makiho	4:15
3.	"Sekaijū no Dare Yori Kitto" (Back Track)		4:02
4.	"Aoi Usagi (2007 Version)" (Back Track)		4:12

=== Charts ===
Chart (2007)	Peak position
Oricon Weekly Singles Chart	44

== Other cover versions ==
- Stephanie Lai covered the song in Cantonese first as "敢恨敢愛 (Dare To Hate and Love)" as a single from her 1993 compilation "Remember 無盡至愛". This version peaked at no. 17 at 903 charts and no. 13 on RTHK. Despite the popularity of Stephanie's version, Andy's version is regarded as classic cantopop ballad.
- Sammi Cheng covered the song in Cantonese as "衝動點唱 (Impulsive Song Request)" taken from her 1993 album "鄭秀文的快樂迷宮 (Sammi's Happy Maze).
- Andy Hui covered this song in Cantonese as "Only You Are Irreplaceable" (唯獨你是不可取替) in his compilation album "雨後陽光" . This version being the most popular Cantonese cover version. Sammi Cheng sings this version more than she sings her version.
- Ryoko Shiraishi and Junichi Miyake covered the song on the 2006 drama CD Mansuri Moe Chapter 6: Happy! Valentine.
- Hitomi Shimatani covered the song on the 2006 various artists cover album Beautiful Woman.
- Tetsurō Oda self-covered the song on his 2006 cover album Melodies and 2009 cover album Songs.
- Cover Lover Project covered the song on the 2007 cover album The Best of Bossa Covers: Seishun Pop.
- Milini Khan (Chaka Khan's daughter) covered the song in English on the 2008 various artists cover album E35: Eigo de Utaou J-pop.
- Osamu Sakata and his daughter Megumi Sakata covered the song on the 2008 various artists cover album Kodomo to Utaitai! Family Hit Songs.
- Yasushi Nakanishi covered the song on his 2008 cover album Standards 3.
- Junichi Inagaki covered the song with Keiko Terada on his 2009 duet cover album Otoko to Onna 2.
- Eric Martin and Debbie Gibson covered the song in English in two vocal arrangements; The "Mr. Vocalist Version" was included on Martin's 2010 cover album Mr. Vocalist 3, while the "Ms. Vocalist Version" was featured on Gibson's 2010 cover album Ms. Vocalist. A solo version by Martin was included on the bonus disc of his 2011 compilation album Mr. Vocalist Best.
- Hideaki Tokunaga covered the song on his 2011 compilation album Vocalist & Ballade Best.
- jyA-Me covered the song with Jun (Cliff Edge) on her 2013 cover album With Me: Duet Cover.
- Nanase Aikawa covered the song on the 2015 tribute album Treasure Box: Tetsuro Oda Songs.
- Daigo covered the song on his 2018 cover album Deing.
- Mone Kamishiraishi covered the song on her 2021 cover album Ano Uta 2.
- Keisuke Yamauchi covered the song on his 2021 album Roots.
- J-Cera covered the song in Korean as her 2023 single "Love Fool" (사랑의 바보).
