= Ese Hombre =

Ese Hombre (Spanish: "That Man") may refer to:

- "Ese Hombre" (Rocío Jurado song), 1979 song, also covered by La India in 1994
- "Ese Hombre" (Nydia Caro song), 1983 song, also covered by Myriam Hernández in 1994
- Por Ese Hombre, 1988 album by Charytín Goyco
- "Por Ese Hombre", 1993 song by Pimpinela, covered by Brenda K. Starr, Tito Nieves, and Victor Manuelle in 2002
- "Quitame Ese Hombre", a 2002 song by Pilar Montenegro from the album Deahogo
