= All Time Greatest Hits (Brenda K. Starr album) =

Greatest hits album by Brenda K. Starr
- Released: May 4, 2002
- Genre: Salsa
- Label: Platano

Brenda K. Starr chronology
Petalos de Fuego (2000)	All Time Greatest Hits (2002)	Temptation (2002)

All Time Greatest Hits is the first compilation by Brenda K. Starr. It spans releases by Starr from 1987–2000. It was released on May 4, 2002 by Platano Records and manufactured by America Disc USA. It features her Billboard Hot 100 hits, (excluding "No Matter What" feat. George Lamond), "Breakfast In Bed", "I Still Believe" and her award-winning song, "What You See Is What You Get." All Time Greatest Hits also includes her Spanish language hits such as "Herida", "Hombre Mio, Hombre Ajeno", "Petalos de Fuego" among others.

== Track listings ==
No.	Title	Length
1.	"I Still Believe" (English Version) (from Brenda K. Starr, 1987)	3:49
2.	"Herida" (from Te Sigo Esperando, 1997)	4:51
3.	"La Razon" (from Petalos de Fuego, 2000)	4:28
4.	"Si Me Preguntan Por Ti" (from No Lo Voy a Olvidar, 1998)	4:39
5.	"Sola" (from Te Sigo Esperando)	5:04
6.	"Breakfast In Bed" (from Brenda K. Starr)	4:05
7.	"Petalos de Fuego" (from Petalos de Fuego)	4:44
8.	"Hombre Mio, Hombre Ajeno" (from No Lo Voy a Olvidar)	4:29
9.	"What You See Is What You Get" (from Brenda K. Starr)	5:19
10.	"No Necesito" (from Te Sigo Esperando)	4:41
11.	"Señor Amante" (from No Lo Voy a Olvidar)	4:51
12.	"I Still Believe" (Spanish Version) (from No Lo Voy a Olvidar)	4:47
13.	"Peligroso Amor" (from Te Sigo Esperando)	5:22
