= 2003 Latin Billboard Music Awards =

Annual American music awards ceremony

2003 Billboard Latin Music Awards
- Date: May 08, 2003
- Venue: Miami Arena, Miami, Florida

The 2003 Billboard Latin Music Awards, produced and broadcast live on Telemundo, were held on Thursday, May 8, 2003. The award show aired on Telemundo at 7pm EST. The awards show was held at the Miami Arena in downtown Miami, Fl.

== Host ==
- Roselyn Sánchez

== Performers ==
- Ricky Martin
- Chayanne
- Thalía
- Eros Ramazzotti
- Gilberto Santa Rosa
- Pilar Montenegro
- Grupo Limite
- La India
- Lupillo Rivera
- A.B. Quintanilla & Kumbia Kings
- Los Tucanes de Tijuana
- Alexandre Pires
- David Bisbal

The following list are the 2003 Billboard Latin Music Award Winners

== Special awards ==
=== Billboard Latin Music Hall of Fame ===
- Armando Manzanero

=== Spirit of Hope Award ===
- El General

=== Star of the Year Award ===
- Ricky Martin

=== Your World Award (Premio Tu Mundo) ===
- Thalía

== Hot Latin Songs of the Year ==
=== Hot Latin Song of the Year ===
- Y Tu Te Vas — Chayanne

=== Vocal Duet or Collaboration ===
- Por Ese Hombre — Brenda K. Starr with Tito Nieves & Víctor Manuelle

=== Artist of the Year ===
- Alexandre Pires

== People ==
=== Songwriter of the Year ===
- Estefano (10 titles)

=== Producer of the Year ===
- Rudy Perez (8 titles)

== Latin Pop Albums ==
=== Male ===
- Un Día Normal – Juanes
- Quizás – Enrique Iglesias
- De Noche En La Ciudad – Aleks Syntek
- MTV Unplugged – Alejandro Sanz

=== Female ===
- Thalía – Thalía
- Desahogo – Pilar Montenegro
- Acústico – Ednita Nazario
- Acústico Vol. II – Ednita Nazario

=== Duo or Group ===
- Revolución de Amor – Maná
- El Primer Instinto – Jaguares
- Las Ketchup – Las Ketchup
- Sin Bandera – Sin Bandera

=== New Artist ===
- Las Ketchup – Las Ketchup
- De Pata Negra – Melody
- Desahogo – Pilar Montenegro
- Sin Bandera – Sin Bandera

=== Top Latin Albums Artist of the Year ===
- Los Temerarios
- Juanes
- Las Ketchup
- Maná

=== Latin Rock/Alternative Album of the Year ===
- Revolución de Amor – Maná
- Radio Bemba Sound System – Manu Chao
- El Primer Instinto – Jaguares
- Un Día Normal – Juanes

== Tropical Album of the Year ==
=== Male ===
- Viceversa – Gilberto Santa Rosa
- Urbano – Elvis Crespo
- Le Preguntaba a la Luna – Víctor Manuelle
- Vuela Muy Alto – Jerry Rivera

=== Female ===
- Latin Songbird: Mi Alma Y Corazon – La India
- Hecho a Mano – Albita
- Pienso en así... – Milly Quezada
- Temptation – Brenda K. Starr

=== Duo Or Group ===
- Confesiones – Monchy y Alexandra
- We Broke the Rules – Aventura
- Latino – Grupo Mania
- Un Gran Dia En El Barrio – Spanish Harlem Orchestra

=== New Artist ===
- Un Gran Dia En El Barrio – Spanish Harlem Orchestra
- We Broke the Rules – Aventura
- Derroche De Amor – Raulin Rodriguez
- No Es Casualidad – Yoskar Sarante

== Regional Mexican Album of the Year ==
=== Male Solo Artist ===
- Amorcito Corazon – Lupillo Rivera
- Un Canto de México – Alejandro Fernández
- Sold Out At The Universal Amphitheatre Vol. 2 – Lupillo Rivera
- Lo Dijo el Corazón – Joan Sebastian

=== Male Duo or Group ===
- Una Lagrima No Basta – Los Temerarios
- Sueños – Intocable
- Perdoname Mi Amor – Conjunto Primavera
- La Reina del Sur – Los Tigres del Norte

=== Female Group or Female Solo Artist ===
- Libre – Jennifer Peña
- Solo Tuya – Aracely Arambula
- Soy Así – Grupo Límite
- A Toda Onda – La Onda

=== New Artist ===
- A Toda Onda – Grupo La Onda
- Solo Tuya – Aracely Arambula
- En La Esquina – Chicos de Barrio
- El Rey de la Banda – Germán Lizárraga y su Banda Estrellas de Sinaloa

== Other Latin ==
=== Latin Greatest Hits Album of the Year ===
- Grandes Exitos – Chayanne

=== Latin Compilation Album of the Year ===
- Las 30 Cumbias Mas Pegadas – Various Artists

=== Latin Jazz Album of the Year ===
- The Shadow Of The Cat – Gato Barbieri

=== Latin Dance Club Play Track of the Year ===
- Escape/Escapar (Remixes) – Enrique Iglesias

=== Latin Dance Single of the Year ===
- Alive (Thunderpuss Remix) – Jennifer Lopez

=== Latin Rap Album of the Year ===
- A La Reconquista – Héctor y Tito

== Labels ==
=== Publisher of the Year ===
- EMI April, ASCAP

=== Publishing Corporation of the Year ===
- EMI Music Publishing

== New Categories ==
=== Latin Pop Airplay Track of the Year, Male ===
- Y Tu Te Vas – Chayanne

=== Latin Pop Airplay Track of the Year, Female ===
- Quitame Ese Hombre – Pilar Montenegro

=== Latin Pop Airplay Track of the Year, Duo or Group ===
- Entra En Mi Vida – Sin Bandera

=== Latin Pop Airplay Track of the Year, New Artist ===
- Entra En Mi Vida – Sin Bandera

=== Tropical/Salsa Airplay Track of the Year, Male ===
- Viviendo – Marc Anthony

=== Tropical/Salsa Airplay Track of the Year, Female ===
- Por Ese Hombre – Brenda K. Starr

=== Tropical/Salsa Airplay Track of the Year, Duo or Group ===
- Te Quiero Igual Que Ayer – Monchy y Alexandra

=== Tropical/Salsa Airplay Track of the Year, New Artist ===
- Asereje – Las Ketchup

=== Regional Mexican Airplay Track of the Year, Male Solo Artist ===
- Te Solte La Rienda – Lupillo Rivera

=== Regional Mexican Airplay Track of the Year, Male Group ===
- Perdoname Mi Amor – Conjunto Primavera

=== Regional Mexican Airplay Track of the Year, Female Group or Female Solo Artist ===
- Quitame Ese Hombre (version nortena) – Pilar Montenegro

=== Regional Mexican Airplay Track of the Year, New Artist ===
- Quitame Ese Hombre (version nortena) – Pilar Montenegro

=== Latin Christian/Gospel Album of the Year ===
- Storm – Fernando Ortega

=== Latin Tour of the Year ===
- Luis Miguel

== Label Awards ==
=== Hot Latin Tracks Label Of the Year ===
- Sony

=== Top Latin Albums Label Of the Year ===
- Sony

=== Latin Pop Airplay Label Of the Year ===
- Sony

=== Tropical/Salsa Airplay Label Of the Year ===
- Sony

=== Regional Mexican Airplay Label Of the Year ===
- Fonovisa

=== Latin Pop Albums Label Of the Year ===
- Sony

=== Tropical/Salsa Albums Label Of the Year ===
- Sony

=== Regional Mexican Albums Label Of the Year ===
- Univision Music Group

== See also ==
- Billboard Latin Music Awards
- Billboard Music Award
