= Brenda Starr (disambiguation) =

Brenda Starr is a comic strip (1940–2011) about a female reporter.

Brenda Starr may also refer to:

- Brenda Starr (1976 film), an American made-for-television adventure film based on the comic strip
- Brenda Starr (1989 film), a film based on the comic strip
- Brenda Starr, Reporter (film), a 1945 film serial based on the comic strip
- Brenda K. Starr (born 1966), American musician
  - Brenda K. Starr (album)
