= Number 1's (Mariah Carey album) =

#1's

Compilation album by Mariah Carey
- Released: November 17, 1998
- Recorded: 1988–1998
- Genres: Pop; soul; R&B
- Length: 73:13
- Label: Columbia
- Producers: Mariah Carey; Jermaine Dupri; Babyface; Walter Afanasieff; Stevie J; Mike Mason (new tracks)

Mariah Carey chronology
Butterfly (1997)	#1's (1998)	Rainbow (1999)

Singles from #1's
- 1. "Sweetheart" Released: September 7, 1998; 2. "When You Believe" Released: November 2, 1998; 3. "I Still Believe" Released: February 8, 1999

#1's is the first compilation album by American singer-songwriter Mariah Carey, released by Columbia Records on November 17, 1998. The album contained Carey's then thirteen number-one singles on the Billboard Hot 100, as well as four new songs. In Japan, the album also included her popular single, "All I Want for Christmas Is You", which was Carey's biggest selling single there.

The album was met with some criticism regarding the new songs and the decision to only include Carey's number-one hits in the United States. Despite this, the album became a worldwide commercial success. It debuted at number four on the Billboard 200, topped the charts in Japan, Singapore, Malaysia, Greece and Taiwan; and reached the top-ten throughout almost every major worldwide music market. #1's was certified six-times platinum by the Recording Industry Association of America (RIAA) and double platinum by the International Federation of the Phonographic Industry (IFPI) denoting shipments of six and two million copies. The album reported sales in Japan at 3,600,000 copies in the first three months and remains the best-selling album of all-time in Japan by a non-Asian artist.

Three new singles supported the album. "Sweetheart", a duet with Jermaine Dupri, received little commercial success due to its limited release. "When You Believe", a duet with Whitney Houston, charted well around the world, peaking at number fifteen in the US, the top two in Norway, Spain, Sweden and Switzerland and the top five in Belgium, France, the Netherlands and the UK, and reaching number one in Hungary. "When You Believe" served as a main theme song for the DreamWorks animated film The Prince of Egypt and won the Academy Award for Best Original Song. The album's third single, "I Still Believe", performed best of the four new songs, peaking at number four in the US.

An updated version of #1's with Carey's then-eighteen number ones, #1 to Infinity, was released on May 15, 2015, coinciding with the beginning of her residency show of the same name in Las Vegas. It showed an updated version of the 1998 album cover as Carey paid homage to herself and her return to Sony Music in that same year.

== Background ==
Everyone swung it like I didn't want to put something out because I wouldn't accept less than a No. 1 Pop Single. That's not even true. Like I didn't want to "break a streak." My streak was broken a long time ago. I don't even have a streak. I had five number ones, then I had records that didn't go to number one. Whatever. I wanted to put out "Breakdown" with Bone-Thugs-N-Harmony. That was a no-brainer. Release it. I'll always be upset "Breakdown" never got its shot.

— Carey, on her disappointment in the singles chosen, during an interview with Vibe.

During mid-1998, after the release of her sixth studio album, Butterfly (1997), the previous September, Carey was in the midst of developing a film and soundtrack project titled All That Glitters. Midway through the project, All That Glitters fell into developmental hell, causing Carey to pause the entire production. During this period, Carey considered embarking on a tour to support Butterfly, which was continuing to sell strongly.

Throughout 1998, the songs Carey was compiling songs for the compilation album led to a publicized conflict with Columbia Records. Carey insisted that while the compilation is not a greatest hits collection, Sony titled the album #1's to reflect the fact that the album is a collection of her number-one hits rather than her "greatest" or "favorite" songs. Carey has frequently cited "Underneath the Stars" (1996) and "Breakdown" (1998) as examples of songs she was unsuccessful in releasing on the collection. Carey has expressed distaste towards the album's song selection, expressing her disappointment in the omission of her "favorite songs."

In December 2001, Columbia released the album Greatest Hits, which featured Carey's number-one singles alongside songs she said "needed to be really heard", such as "Underneath the Stars" and "Forever". Carey discussed the album in an interview with MTV, stating, "There's a lot of songs that I'm happy are gonna see the light of day. I think people are going to like this Greatest Hits because there are songs on it that were not necessarily singles." Every single included in #1's was also included in Greatest Hits.

In Carey's 2020 memoir The Meaning of Mariah Carey, Carey states that she conceptualized #1's as part of a four-album agreement with Sony Music to terminate her contract with Columbia. Sony wanted to release an album that featured her US number-one singles, void of any new material. However, Carey felt that not including any new material would be unfair to fans, and eventually four new songs were included to accompany her thirteen number ones.

== Writing and composition ==
The first of Carey's number ones to be featured on the album was "Vision of Love". It was Carey's first single and was the song that propelled her into the music scene. The song received acclaim, and was credited with influencing and popularizing the use of melisma throughout the 1990s. Three other songs were included from her self-titled debut album, of them were "Love Takes Time", "Someday" and "I Don't Wanna Cry". The fifth single featured on the album was "Emotions", the lead single from the album of the same name. Because of the album's strict array of chart topping singles, none of the other singles on Emotions made the track listing. Another song that was featured on #1's was Carey's version of the Jackson 5 classic, "I'll Be There", which was the lead single from her live album, MTV Unplugged. The singles from Carey's 1993 release Music Box, made an appearance on the album as well. "Dreamlover", the seventh number one from the album, was the lead single from Music Box. The song topped the Billboard Hot 100 for eight weeks and was described as a "slight piece of pop fluff", representing a more commercial side to Carey than the "more ambitious", "Vision of Love". The song was the start of a vocal maturity for Carey, and was considered a notable song in her career. The second single from Music Box, "Hero", also made the album's final cut. According to author Chris Nickson, Hero was one of Carey's "most inspirational ballads". The album's third single, "Without You" failed to make the US album version, since it did not reach the summit spot there; however, due to the song's popularity in Europe, it was included in the album's international edition.

"All I Want for Christmas Is You", the lead single from Carey's holiday album Merry Christmas also made the international track listing. The song became one of the best-selling singles by a non–Asian female, and the best-selling Japanese single of 1994, selling 1.1 million copies. Additionally, "All I Want for Christmas Is You" was called "one of the essential musical hallmarks of the holiday season", and is the only holiday song and ringtone to reach multi-platinum status in the US. Occupying three of the thirteen number ones on the album were the singles from Carey's 1995 release, Daydream. The album's lead single "Fantasy", was featured on #1's. However, it was the song's official remix, which featured rap verses from Ol' Dirty Bastard, which made the album cut. This was a personal decision made by Carey, as it was of her preference. The second song from Daydream to be featured on the album was "One Sweet Day", Carey's duet with Boyz II Men. The song topped the Hot 100 for a then-unprecedented sixteen weeks, and held the record for longest running number-one song in Hot 100 history until 2019. The third and final song from the album, "Always Be My Baby", spent two weeks atop the charts in the US, therefore earning a place on the album as well.

Carey's most recent studio effort at the time, Butterfly, also yielded two number-one songs. The album's lead single, "Honey", was a career-transitional song for Carey, which introduced her as a hip hop soul artist, as well as featured extended rap verses throughout the song. While very different than anything Carey had ever recorded, the track was described as "street Hip-Hop music, with a booming bass." The second song from Butterfly, "My All", spent one week atop the charts. Carey described the song as "[having] a lush sound and intense styling." Solely written by Carey and Walter Afanasieff, "My All" featured guitar arpeggios, which were synthetically created with the clever use of sampling and playing keyboard notes. As a result, the song was well-received, being called a "slinky, slow jam R&B sound, that fit Mariah like a glove."

=== New material ===
Since Carey intended #1's to serve as a sign of gratitude to her fans, the album contained four new songs not previously included on her albums. The first was a cover of Rainy Davis' "Sweetheart" (1987) performed as a duet with co-producer and rapper Jermaine Dupri. Dupri had worked with Carey in the past, contributing to her album Daydream, and co-produced several hip-hop remixes of her songs. Carey said of the inspiration for its recording, "I was thinking of the old songs I used to listen to when I was in school. It's a really cute record. Young girls'll like it the way I liked it when I was growing up." Another new song featured on #1's was "When You Believe", which Carey said was included because she felt it was "a miracle" that she and Houston collaborated on a record. During the development of All That Glitters, Carey had been introduced to DreamWorks producer Jeffrey Katzenberg, who asked her if she would record the song "When You Believe" for the soundtrack to the animated film The Prince of Egypt. Carey and Houston were shown the film separately, and both became very enthusiastic about participating in the project. In an interview with MTV, Carey made the following statement regarding "When You Believe" and working with Whitney Houston:

"It's sort of a message song. It's what 'Prince of Egypt' is about, Moses. If we were ever going to come together on any kind of record, this is definitely the right one, and really the coolest thing to me is that after all of the drama and everybody making it like we had a rivalry, she was just really cool and we had a really good time in the studio. We had fun. And so, if nothing else, it was a good experience... and diva-ism, whatever."

The song was co-written by Stephen Schwartz and Babyface, who also produced the song. Carey had previously collaborated with Babyface on her albums, Music Box (1993) and Daydream (1995). Babyface expressed how he went through more than one version of the song and described its production as a beautiful movie ballad, something different than he, Carey or Houston ever recorded. In an interview with Vibe, Carey said that she "liked [the song] the way it was." She had characterised it as "a very big ballad but in an inspirational way" and denied speculation that there had been past rivalry or animosity between her and Houston prior to its recording: "I never even really talked to her until this. We never had any issues between us. The media and everybody made it an issue."

Mariah and I got along very great. We had never talked and never sang together before. We just had a chance for camaraderie, singer-to-singer, artist-to-artist, that kind of thing. We just laughed and talked and laughed and talked and sang in between that ... It's good to know that two ladies of soul can still be friends."

— Houston, on her friendship and working with Mariah Carey.

Carey co-wrote and co-produced the song "Whenever You Call" with longtime collaborator Walter Afanasieff for her album, Butterfly. However, in order to change the song's tempo and format, Carey decided to re-do the song as a duet with Brian McKnight, because she felt it was one of the best songs on Butterfly. Carey had also expressed how McKnight's vocals added a great deal to the song, describing the project as "perfecting the song". McKnight shared similar sentiments, saying, "It was amazing to go into the studio with someone who's so successful, and has that kind of track record. Mariah is someone who could ask anyone in the world to sing with her, and they called me. The album contains a duet with Whitney Houston ... it's just been great company to be in."

One of the songs Carey recorded specifically for #1's was a cover of Brenda K. Starr's "I Still Believe" (1988) co-produced by Stevie J and Mike Mason. During the late 1980s, Starr helped Carey secure a record contract while she worked as Starr's backup singer. In the album's liner notes, Carey wrote that the purpose of the song was solely paying tribute to her. According to Carey, the song "reminds me of the fact that not long ago I was a teenage girl with nothing to my name but a demo tape, my voice, and my ability to write songs. Brenda K. Starr treated me like a 'star' and gave me a shot." Another song Carey and Stevie J co-produced was a cover of Diana Ross' "Theme from Mahogany (Do You Know Where You're Going To)" (1975). Only included on international editions of the album, it was the third non-original song on the album, and experienced a limited release throughout few countries in Europe. During a press release for #1's, it was reported that an exclusive live version of "Hero" would be included, however, the idea fell through and was never released.

== Promotion ==
In December 1999, Columbia released the video/DVD #1's, which contained music videos and recordings of live performances for the number-one singles featured on #1's, as well as "Heartbreaker", the lead single from Carey's following album Rainbow (1999), which had already reached number one at the time.

=== Singles ===
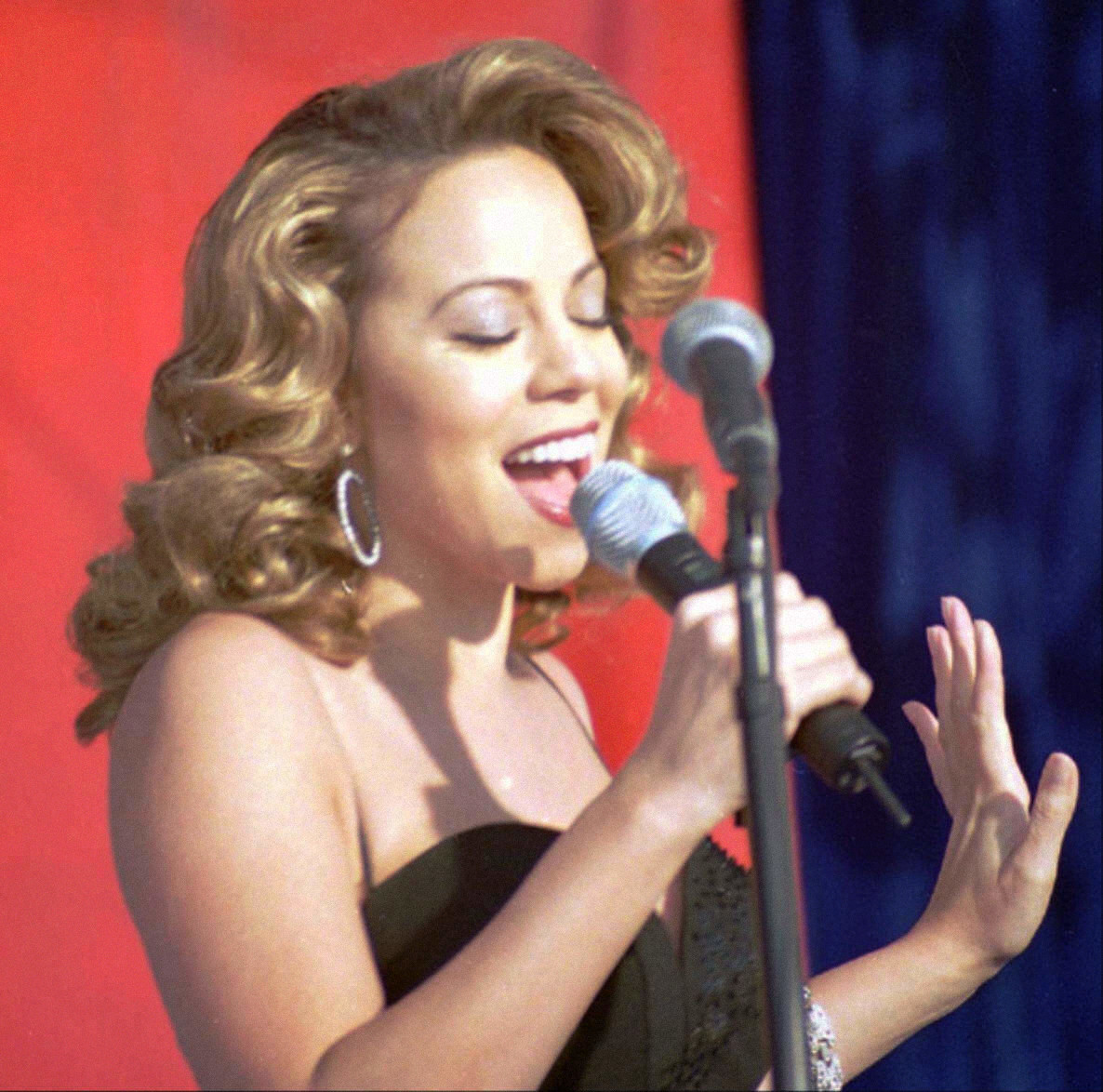
Carey at the Edwards Air Force Base during the making of the "I Still Believe" music video in December 1998.

"Sweetheart" was released to American urban contemporary radio on September 7, 1998, and was promoted as the third single for Jermaine Dupri's debut album Life in 1472, and the lead single for #1's. A commercial release was scheduled for September 29, but was canceled in favor of promoting "When You Believe". In the US, due to the song's low radio airplay, "Sweetheart" only reached number twenty-five on Billboard's Bubbling Under Hot 100 Singles. Internationally, the song performed better, peaking within the top twenty in Germany and Switzerland.

"When You Believe", released as the album's second single and first commercially available single on November 2, was also promoted as the first single from both The Prince of Egypt: Original Soundtrack and Houston's fourth studio album My Love Is Your Love. It achieved worldwide success, peaking within the top two in Norway, Spain, Sweden and Switzerland, and in the top five in Belgium, the Netherlands, France and the United Kingdom. In the UK, "When You Believe" became one of Carey's biggest successes, selling 260,000 units. Despite reaching high positions around the globe, "When You Believe" performed moderately in the US, where it peaked at number fifteen.

Released as the album's third single on February 8, 1999, "I Still Believe" performed stronger in the US than the album's previous singles, peaking at number four. The song was certified platinum in the United States, however performing weakly in other territories. "I Still Believe" performed well in Spain, where it peaked at number seven, and in Canada, where the song reached the top-ten.

=== Promotional singles ===
"Do You Know Where You're Going To" was issued as a promotional single from Internation edition in Brazil and some parts of Europe during June. It did not chart in any major music market. "Whenever You Call" was considered for release as a single in mid-1999, but its promotion was canceled due to the impending release of Rainbow and its lead single "Heartbreaker".

== Critical reception ==
Professional ratings
Review scores
Source	Rating
AllMusic	4.5/5 stars
Robert Christgau	(choice cut)
The Encyclopedia of Popular Music	4/5 stars
Entertainment Weekly	B−
NME	1/10

The album received generally mixed reviews from music critics. #1's was awarded four and a half out of five stars from Heather Phares of AllMusic. Phares complimented the album's content, feeling the song selection was too commercial, but very strong. Additionally, Phares wrote "Her career has been an extraordinary succession of number ones and record-breaking firsts in the music world, her entire album catalog has achieved RIAA multi-platinum status." Phares also commented on the accompanying DVD, writing, "Interviews and interactive menus make #1's a better-than-average DVD video collection and one that will doubtlessly please Carey's legions of fans." Mark Bautz, an editor from Entertainment Weekly gave the album a B−. Bautz felt that Carey's primary limitation was "wan, homogeneous songs" and that "hearing them months apart on the radio makes them passable, but strung together on #1's they're like a mile-long elevator ride." While criticizing the album for its song selection and content, he complimented the songs "My All" and the remix for "Fantasy", stating that they "stand up as two of the best pop tunes of the '90s." The album received a scathing review from Britain's NME magazine, with its critic David Stubbs writing that Carey is "cold-eyed" and her output calculated to achieve commercial success.

In a review for Carey's 2001 album, Greatest Hits, Sal Cinquemani of Slant Magazine felt the album was solely a string of Carey's most commercial and popular hits, however, not her best. Cinquemani complimented Greatest Hits and wrote, "It seems like only yesterday that we were served with the self-congratulatory #1's, a collection of Carey's record-breaking string of chart-toppers, but the 27-track Greatest Hits is the singer's first proper hits compilation." In his consumer guide for The Village Voice, critic Robert Christgau gave the album a "choice cut" rating, indicating "a good song on an album that isn't worth your time or money; Some (choice cut)s are arbitrarily personal, others inescapably social." His "choice cut" was the remix of "Fantasy".

=== Accolades ===
In 1998, Carey received the World Music Awards for becoming the "World's Best Selling Recording Artist of the 1990s" as well as the award for "World's Best Selling R&B Artist". Carey received the 1998 Billboard Music Award for Artist of the Decade. At the 1999 BMI Music Awards, Carey took home the coveted Songwriter of the Year award. "When You Believe" was nominated at the 2000 Grammy Awards for Best Pop Collaboration with Vocals and won an NAACP Image Award for Outstanding Duo or Group. Additionally, the song won the award for Best Original Song at the 71st annual Academy Awards. After the album's release, Carey won a Blockbuster Entertainment Award in the category of Favorite Female Artist, and Entertainer of the Year at the Soul Train Music Awards. #1's won a 1999 Japan Gold Disc Award for International Pop Album of the Year.

== Commercial performance ==
As executives at Columbia had done during the album's development, Eric Boehlert of Rolling Stone noted the importance of the release date of #1's and other albums on sale during the same period: "Artists who make a habit of hitting it big during the holiday shopping season are wise indeed, as sales traditionally skyrocket. This year is no exception." Journalist and author Marc Shapiro, in his biography of Carey, attributed the album's high sales to the presence of new songs, writing:

"The consensus among the music press was that Mariah's insistence on including the new material made all the difference in increasing sales figures more than expected. Including some new with the old in a greatest-hits package had been tried from time to time by other artists with varying degrees of success, but with the triumph of #1's, it would become a regular element in nearly all future greatest-hits albums. As such packages go, #1's was a solid retrospective of Mariah's chart hits, but because these songs were oversaturating the radio, including a favorite nonhit album track or two might have made a nice change. The new songs were a definite bonus even though none ever really rose to the spectacular level of her best ... they added up to a nice touch but little more."

#1's was released in the same week as several other albums by high-profile musicians such as Garth Brooks, Jewel, Method Man, Ice Cube and Whitney Houston. MTV News called November 17 "what is shaping up to be the music industry's Super Tuesday ... most onlookers know that first week sales aren't everything, but they will also tell you that they are pretty darn important." #1's entered the U.S. Billboard 200 at number four, with 221,000 copies sold in its first week. In its sixth week of release (ending January 2) the album's weekly sales peaked at 360,000 copies. It remained in the top twenty for thirteen weeks and on the chart for sixty-two weeks. It made two re-entries, including in 2022, where it peaked at number 20. In Canada, #1's was certified triple-platinum by the Canadian Recording Industry Association (CRIA), denoting shipments of 300,000 copies.

In Europe, the album experienced success, peaking within the top-ten in almost every major music market. By 2003, the album received a double-platinum certification by the International Federation of the Phonographic Industry (IFPI), denoting shipments of two million copies throughout Europe, until that year. In France, #1's was certified double-platinum. The album received a platinum certification in Belgium, Spain, Sweden, Switzerland and the United Kingdom, where it shipped 800,000 copies. #1's received a gold certification in Germany, the Netherlands and Norway. Aside from its success in Europe, the album experienced its highest sales in Japan (after the US), where it sold 3,600,000 copies in the first three months after its release. In Japan, #1's remains the best-selling album in Japan by a non-Asian artist and is certified the triple-Million award. In 2022, the album was certified six-times platinum by the Recording Industry Association of America (RIAA), denoting shipments of six million copies throughout the United States.

== Track listing ==
#1's – Standard edition
No.	Title	Lyrics	Music	Producer(s)	Length
1.	"Sweetheart" (Rainy Davis cover) (featuring JD)	Rainy Davis; Peter Warner	Davis; Warner	Mariah Carey; Jermaine Dupri	4:25
2.	"When You Believe" (with Whitney Houston, from The Prince of Egypt, 1998)	Stephen Schwartz	Schwartz; Babyface^{[a]}	Babyface	4:36
3.	"Whenever You Call" (with Brian McKnight, from Butterfly, 1997)	Carey	Carey; Walter Afanasieff	Carey; Afanasieff	4:23
4.	"My All" (from Butterfly)	Carey	Carey; Afanasieff	Carey; Afanasieff	3:52
5.	"Honey" (from Butterfly)	Carey	Carey; Sean Combs; Kamaal Fareed; Stevie Jordan; Stephen Hague; Bobby Robinson; Ronald Larkins; Larry Price; Malcolm McLaren	Carey; Combs; The Ummah; Stevie J	5:00
6.	"Always Be My Baby" (from Daydream, 1995)	Carey	Carey; Dupri; Manuel Seal	Carey; Dupri; Seal^{[b]}	4:20
7.	"One Sweet Day" (with Boyz II Men) (from Daydream)	Carey; Nathan Morris; Wanya Morris; Michael McCary; Shawn Stockman	Carey; Afanasieff	Carey; Afanasieff	4:42
8.	"Fantasy" (featuring Ol' Dirty Bastard)	Carey; Chris Frantz; Tina Weymouth	Carey; Frantz; Weymouth; Dave Hall; Adrian Belew; Steven Stanley	Carey; Hall; Combs^{[c]}	4:54
9.	"Hero" (from Music Box, 1993)	Carey	Carey; Afanasieff	Carey; Afanasieff	4:20
10.	"Dreamlover" (from Music Box)	Carey	Carey; Hall	Carey; Afanasieff; Hall^{[b]}	3:54
11.	"I'll Be There" (Jackson 5 cover) (featuring Trey Lorenz) (from MTV Unplugged, 1992)	Hal Davis; Berry Gordy; Willie Hutch; Bob West	Davis; Gordy; Hutch; West	Carey; Afanasieff	4:25
12.	"Emotions" (from Emotions, 1991)	Carey	Carey; David Cole; Robert Clivillés	Carey; Cole; Clivillés	4:10
13.	"I Don't Wanna Cry" (from Mariah Carey, 1990)	Carey; Narada Michael Walden	Carey; Walden	Walden	4:49
14.	"Someday" (from Mariah Carey)	Carey	Carey; Margulies	Ric Wake	4:08
15.	"Love Takes Time" (from Mariah Carey)	Carey	Carey; Margulies	Afanasieff	3:49
16.	"Vision of Love" (from Mariah Carey)	Carey	Carey; Margulies	Rhett Lawrence; Walden^{[d]}	3:31
17.	"I Still Believe" (Brenda K. Starr cover)	Antonina Armato; Giuseppe Cantarelli	Armato; Cantarelli	Carey; Stevie J; Mike Mason	3:56
Total length:					73:13

#1's – International edition
No.	Title	Lyrics	Music	Producer(s)	Length
13.	"Someday" (from Mariah Carey)	Carey	Carey; Margulies	Ric Wake	4:07
14.	"Love Takes Time" (from Mariah Carey)	Carey	Carey; Margulies	Afanasieff	3:49
15.	"Vision of Love" (from Mariah Carey)	Carey	Carey; Margulies	Lawrence; Walden^{[d]}	3:31
16.	"I Still Believe" (Brenda K. Starr cover)	Armato; Cantarelli	Armato; Cantarelli	Carey; Stevie J; Mason	3:56
17.	"Without You" (Badfinger cover) (from Music Box)	Pete Ham; Tom Evans	Ham; Evans	Carey; Afanasieff	3:35
18.	"Do You Know Where You're Going To (Theme from Mahogany)" (Diana Ross cover)	Michael Masser; Gerald Goffin	Masser; Goffin	Carey; Stevie J	3:47
Total length:					75:36

#1's – Japanese edition
No.	Title	Lyrics	Music	Producer(s)	Length
19.	"All I Want for Christmas Is You" (from Merry Christmas, 1994)	Carey	Carey; Afanasieff	Carey; Afanasieff	4:01
Total length:					79:37

Notes

- ^{^[a]} signifies an additional composer
- ^{^[b]} signifies a co-producer
- ^{^[c]} signifies a remixer
- ^{^[d]} signifies an additional producer

== Personnel ==
Adapted from the Number 1's liner notes.

- Mariah Carey – lead vocals, background vocals
- Walter Afanasieff – keyboards, additional keyboards, synthesizers
- Dave Hall – synthesizers, keyboards, rhythm programming
- Ben Margulies – drums, keyboards, programming
- Babyface – arranger
- Narada Michael Walden – drums
- Dan Shea – drums, percussion
- Ric Wake – drum programming
- Rhett Lawrence – keyboards
- Robert Clivillés – drums, percussion
- Loris Holland – synthesizers, keyboards, rhythm programming
- David Cole – keyboards
- Sean "Puffy" Combs – background vocals, keyboards, synthesizers
- Cory Rooney – drum programming, keyboards
- Kamall Fareed – programming, drums
- James T. Alfano – programming, guitars
- Anthony Henderson – guitars, background vocals, keyboards
- Charles Scruggs – bass, background vocals, keyboards
- Steven Jordan – programming
- Cindy Mizelle – background vocals
- Mark C. Rooney – background vocals
- Melonie Daniels – background vocals
- Kelly Price – background vocals
- Shanrae Price – background vocals

Production

- Mariah Carey – arranger
- Walter Afanasieff – arranger
- Dave Hall – arranger
- Babyface – arranger
- Narada Michael Walden – arranger, additional production, rhythm arrangement
- Ric Wake – additional arrangement
- Rich Tancredi – additional arrangement
- Patrick Dillett – engineer, recording, mixing
- Bob Cadway – engineer, recording, mixing
- Rhett Lawrence – recording, mixing, arranger
- Dana Jon Chappelle – engineer, mixing, additional engineering
- Missy Elliott – arranger
- Albert Johnson – vocal engineering, bass, drums
- David Morales – synthesizers, drum percussion, bass
- Bobby Robinson – engineer, track mixer
- Bob Rosa – engineer, mix engineer
- David Gleeson – engineer
- Dana Jon Chappelle – engineer, vocal engineering
- Acar Key – engineer
- Frank Filipetti – engineer
- Mark Krieg – second engineer
- Kirk Yano – additional tracking engineer
- Mick Guzauski – mixing
- Bob Ludwig – mastering, Gateway Master Studios

== Charts ==
=== Weekly charts ===
Chart (1998–2000)	Peak position
Australian Albums (ARIA)	6
Austrian Albums (Ö3 Austria)	6
Belgian Albums (Ultratop Flanders)	11
Belgian Albums (Ultratop Wallonia)	6
Canadian Albums (Billboard)	6
Canadian R&B Albums (SoundScan)	1
Danish Albums (Hitlisten)	6
Dutch Albums (Album Top 100)	15
European Albums (Top 100)	5
Finnish Albums (Suomen virallinen lista)	9
French Compilations (SNEP)	2
German Albums (Offizielle Top 100)	10
Greek Albums (IFPI)	1
Hungarian Albums (MAHASZ)	15
Icelandic Albums (Tónlist)	6
Irish Albums (IRMA)	10
Italian Albums (FIMI)	6
Japanese Albums (Oricon)	1
Malaysian Albums (RIM)	1
New Zealand Albums (RMNZ)	13
Norwegian Albums (VG-lista)	6
Portuguese Albums (AFP)	10
Scottish Albums (Official Charts)	26
Singapore Albums (SPVA)	1
Spanish Albums (PROMUSICAE)	5
Swedish Albums (Sverigetopplistan)	8
Swiss Albums (Schweizer Hitparade)	3
Taiwanese Albums (IFPI)	1
UK Albums (Official Charts)	10
UK Dance Albums (OCC)	1
UK R&B Albums (Official Charts)	1
US Billboard 200	4
US Top R&B/Hip-Hop Albums (Billboard)	6

Chart (2005–2015)	Peak position
UK R&B Albums (Official Charts)	20

Chart (2022)	Peak position
Danish Vinyl Albums (Hitlisten)	24
Greek Albums (IFPI)	39
Scottish Albums (OCC)	40
UK R&B Albums (OCC)	4
UK Record Store (OCC)	18
US Billboard 200	20
US Top R&B/Hip-Hop Albums (Billboard)	11
US Indie Store Album Sales (Billboard)	13

=== Monthly charts ===
Chart (1999)	Peak position
South Korean Albums (RIAK)	5

=== Year-end charts ===
Chart (1998)	Position
Australian Albums (ARIA)	43
Belgian Albums (Ultratop Flanders)	62
Belgian Albums (Ultratop Wallonia)	55
Canadian Albums (SoundScan)	63
Canadian R&B Albums (SoundScan)	8
Italian Albums (FIMI)	13
Japanese Albums (Oricon)	24
Norwegian Christmas Period Albums (VG-lista)	11
Swedish Albums (Sverigetopplistan)	63
UK Albums (OCC)	30

Chart (1999)	Position
Austrian Albums (Ö3 Austria)	43
Belgian Albums (Ultratop Flanders)	64
Belgian Albums (Ultratop Wallonia)	25
Canada Top Albums/CDs (RPM)	67
Danish Albums (Hitlisten)	90
Dutch Albums (Album Top 100)	62
European Albums (Top 100)	32
French Compilations (SNEP)	6
German Albums (Offizielle Top 100)	35
Japanese Albums (Oricon)	11
Swedish Albums (Sverigetopplistan)	99
Swiss Albums (Schweizer Hitparade)	29
UK Albums (OCC)	95
US Billboard 200	19
US Top R&B/Hip-Hop Albums (Billboard)	24

Chart (2001)	Position
Canadian R&B Albums (SoundScan)	162

== Certifications and sales ==
Region	Certification	Certified units/sales
Argentina (CAPIF)	Gold	30,000^{^}
Australia (ARIA)	2× Platinum	140,000^{‡}
Belgium (BRMA)	Platinum	50,000^{*}
Brazil (Pro-Música Brasil)	Platinum	250,000^{‡}
Canada (Music Canada)	3× Platinum	300,000^{^}
France (SNEP)	2× Platinum	600,000^{*}
Germany (BVMI)	Gold	250,000^{^}
Japan (RIAJ)	3× Million	3,600,000
Netherlands (NVPI)	Gold	50,000^{^}
New Zealand (RMNZ)	2× Platinum	30,000^{^}
Norway (IFPI Norway)	Gold	25,000^{*}
South Korea	—	352,405
Spain (Promusicae)	Platinum	100,000^{^}
Sweden (GLF)	Platinum	80,000^{^}
Switzerland (IFPI Switzerland)	Platinum	50,000^{^}
United Kingdom (BPI)	2× Platinum	768,000
United States (RIAA)	6× Platinum	6,000,000^{‡}
Summaries
Europe (IFPI)	2× Platinum	2,000,000^{*}
^{*} Sales figures based on certification alone.^{^} Shipments figures based on certification alone.^{‡} Sales+streaming figures based on certification alone.

== See also ==
- List of best-selling albums by women
- List of best-selling albums in Japan
