= List of number-one Billboard Regional Mexican Songs of 2002 =

The Billboard Regional Mexican Songs chart ranks the best-performing Regional Mexican singles in the United States. Published weekly by Billboard magazine, it ranks the "most popular regional Mexican songs, ranked by radio airplay audience impressions as measured by Nielsen Music."

== Chart history ==
Key
†	Indicates number 1 on Billboard's year-end regional Mexican chart

Issue date	Song	Artist(s)	Ref.
January 5	"No me conoces aún" †	Palomo	
January 12	"No me conoces aún" †	Palomo	
January 19	"No me conoces aún" †	Palomo	
January 26	"No me conoces aún" †	Palomo	
February 2	"No me conoces aún" †	Palomo	
February 9	"No me conoces aún" †	Palomo	
February 16	"En la misma cama"	Liberación	
February 23	"No me conoces aún" †	Palomo	
March 2	"En la misma cama"	Liberación	
March 9	"Sufriendo a solas"	Lupillo Rivera	
March 16	"Sufriendo a solas"	Lupillo Rivera	
March 23	"Quítame ese hombre"	Pilar Montenegro	
March 30	"Quítame ese hombre"	Pilar Montenegro	
April 6	"Quítame ese hombre"	Pilar Montenegro	
April 13	"Quítame ese hombre"	Pilar Montenegro	
April 20	"No me conoces aún" †	Palomo	
April 27	"El poder de tus manos"	Intocable	
May 4	"Quítame ese hombre"	Pilar Montenegro	
May 11	"Quítame ese hombre"	Pilar Montenegro	
May 18	"Quítame ese hombre"	Pilar Montenegro	
May 25	"Quítame ese hombre"	Pilar Montenegro	
June 1	"El poder de tus manos"	Intocable	
June 8	"El poder de tus manos"	Intocable	
June 15	"El poder de tus manos"	Intocable	
June 22	"El poder de tus manos"	Intocable	
June 29	"El poder de tus manos"	Intocable	
July 6	"Quítame ese hombre"	Pilar Montenegro	
July 13	"Una lágrima no basta"	Los Temerarios	
July 20	"El poder de tus manos"	Intocable	
July 27	"El poder de tus manos"	Intocable	
August 3	"Juro por Dios"	Banda Tierra Blanca	
August 10	"Jugo a la vida"	Los Tucanes de Tijuana	
August 17	"Jugo a la vida"	Los Tucanes de Tijuana	
August 24	"No me sé rajar"	Banda el Recodo de Cruz Lizárraga	
August 31	"Jugo a la vida"	Los Tucanes de Tijuana	
September 7	"Perdóname mi amor"	Conjunto Primavera	
September 14	"Perdóname mi amor"	Conjunto Primavera	
September 21	"Perdóname mi amor"	Conjunto Primavera	
September 28	"Perdóname mi amor"	Conjunto Primavera	
October 5	"Perdóname mi amor"	Conjunto Primavera	
October 12	"Perdóname mi amor"	Conjunto Primavera	
October 19	"Perdóname mi amor"	Conjunto Primavera	
October 26	"Perdóname mi amor"	Conjunto Primavera	
November 2	"Perdóname mi amor"	Conjunto Primavera	
November 9	"Perdóname mi amor"	Conjunto Primavera	
November 16	"Perdóname mi amor"	Conjunto Primavera	
November 23	"Perdóname mi amor"	Conjunto Primavera	
November 30	"Sueña"	Intocable	
December 7	"Sueña"	Intocable	
December 14	"Sueña"	Intocable	
December 21	"Sueña"	Intocable	
December 28	"Sueña"	Intocable	
