= List of number-one Billboard Latin Tropical Airplay of 2002 =

The Latin Tropical Airplay chart is a music chart that ranks the best-performing tropical songs of the United States. It has since been renamed the Tropical Songs chart. Published by Billboard magazine, the data are compiled by Nielsen Broadcast Data Systems based on each single's weekly airplay.

== Chart history ==
| Issue date | Song | Artist(s) | Reference(s) |
|---|---|---|---|
| January 5, 2002 | "La Agarro Bajando" | Gilberto Santa Rosa | |
| January 12, 2002 | "Celos" | Marc Anthony | |
| January 19, 2002 | "Celos" | Marc Anthony | |
| January 26, 2002 | "Celos" | Marc Anthony | |
| February 2, 2002 | "Celos" | Marc Anthony | |
| February 9, 2002 | "La Agarro Bajando" | Gilberto Santa Rosa | |
| February 16, 2002 | "Celos" | Marc Anthony | |
| February 23, 2002 | "Celos" | Marc Anthony | |
| March 2, 2002 | "Celos" | Marc Anthony | |
| March 9, 2002 | "La Agarro Bajando" | Gilberto Santa Rosa | |
| March 16, 2002 | "Luna Nueva" | Carlos Vives | |
| March 23, 2002 | "Luna Nueva" | Carlos Vives | |
| March 30, 2002 | "Luna Nueva" | Carlos Vives | |
| April 6, 2002 | "La Agarro Bajando" | Gilberto Santa Rosa | |
| April 13, 2002 | "La Agarro Bajando" | Gilberto Santa Rosa | |
| April 20, 2002 | "Por Ese Hombre" | Brenda K. Starr with Tito Nieves and Víctor Manuelle | |
| April 27, 2002 | "Por Ese Hombre" | Brenda K. Starr with Tito Nieves and Víctor Manuelle | |
| May 4, 2002 | "Por Ese Hombre" | Brenda K. Starr with Tito Nieves and Víctor Manuelle | |
| May 11, 2002 | "Por Ese Hombre" | Brenda K. Starr with Tito Nieves and Víctor Manuelle | |
| May 18, 2002 | "Por Ese Hombre" | Brenda K. Starr with Tito Nieves and Víctor Manuelle | |
| May 25, 2002 | "Por Ese Hombre" | Brenda K. Starr with Tito Nieves and Víctor Manuelle | |
| June 1, 2002 | "Por Ese Hombre" | Brenda K. Starr with Tito Nieves and Víctor Manuelle | |
| June 8, 2002 | "Por Ese Hombre" | Brenda K. Starr with Tito Nieves and Víctor Manuelle | |
| June 15, 2002 | "Y Tu Te Vas (Salsa version)" | Chayanne | |
| June 22, 2002 | "Y Tu Te Vas (Salsa version)" | Chayanne | |
| June 29, 2002 | "Viviendo" | Marc Anthony | |
| July 6, 2002 | "Y Tu Te Vas (Salsa version)" | Chayanne | |
| July 13, 2002 | "Y Tu Te Vas (Salsa version)" | Chayanne | |
| July 20, 2002 | "Y Tu Te Vas (Salsa version)" | Chayanne | |
| July 27, 2002 | "Y Tu Te Vas (Salsa version)" | Chayanne | |
| August 3, 2002 | "Y Tu Te Vas (Salsa version)" | Chayanne | |
| August 10, 2002 | "Viviendo" | Marc Anthony | |
| August 17, 2002 | "Viviendo" | Marc Anthony | |
| August 24, 2002 | "A Dios le Pido" | Juanes | |
| August 31, 2002 | "Vuela Muy Alto (Salsa version)" | Jerry Rivera | |
| September 7, 2002 | "Vuela Muy Alto (Salsa version)" | Jerry Rivera | |
| September 14, 2002 | "Vuela Muy Alto (Salsa version)" | Jerry Rivera | |
| September 21, 2002 | "Vuela Muy Alto (Salsa version)" | Jerry Rivera | |
| September 28, 2002 | "Vuela Muy Alto (Salsa version)" | Jerry Rivera | |
| October 5, 2002 | "Por Mas Que Intento (Salsa version)" | Gilberto Santa Rosa | |
| October 12, 2002 | "Por Mas Que Intento (Salsa version)" | Gilberto Santa Rosa | |
| October 19, 2002 | "Por Mas Que Intento (Salsa version)" | Gilberto Santa Rosa | |
| October 26, 2002 | "Por Mas Que Intento (Salsa version)" | Gilberto Santa Rosa | |
| November 2, 2002 | "No me enseñaste" | Thalía | |
| November 9, 2002 | "Aserejé" | Las Ketchup | |
| November 16, 2002 | "Le Preguntaba a La Luna" | Víctor Manuelle | |
| November 23, 2002 | "Le Preguntaba a La Luna" | Víctor Manuelle | |
| November 30, 2002 | "Le Preguntaba a La Luna" | Víctor Manuelle | |
| December 7, 2002 | "Le Preguntaba a La Luna" | Víctor Manuelle | |
| December 14, 2002 | "Le Preguntaba a La Luna" | Víctor Manuelle | |
| December 21, 2002 | "Si No Estas" (Salsa version) | Area 305 | |
| December 28, 2002 | "En Nombre de los Dos" | Víctor Manuelle | |
