= Temptation (Brenda K. Starr album) =

Studio album by Brenda K. Starr
- Released: March 26, 2002
- Recorded: Late 2001-2002
- Genres: Salsa, Latin pop
- Length: 51:02
- Label: Sony Discos
- Producers: Eddie Arroyo, Luis Columna, Alejandro Jaén, Rudy Pérez, Humberto Ramirez

Brenda K. Starr chronology
Petalos de Fuego (2000)	Temptation (2002)	Atrevete a Olvidarme (2005)

Temptation is the seventh studio album by American singer Brenda K. Starr. It was released on March 26, 2002 on Sony Discos.

The album featured four singles, "Por Ese Hombre," the title track, "Gato Bajo La Lluvia," and "Rabia." The lead single peaked at number eleven on the Billboard Hot Latin Tracks chart and number one on the Billboard Tropical/Salsa Airplay chart, leading the latter chart for eight consecutive weeks in 2002.

The album reached the top thirty of the Billboard Top Latin Albums chart and number three on the Billboard Tropical/Salsa Albums chart.

== Background ==
Starr had received several record deal offers including one from Universal Music Latino, opting to sign with Sony Discos. Production for the album took place in late 2001 in Miami and in Puerto Rico. While choosing songs to record for the album, Starr decided upon songs she felt would showcase her growth and potential as an artist. She wanted to record songs from an array of diverse musical genres.

== Critical reception ==
At the Latin Billboard Music Awards of 2003, the album spawned awards for "Hot Latin Track of the Year, Vocal Duo" and "Tropical/Salsa Airplay Track of the Year, Female," both for "Por Ese Hombre." The album received a nomination for "Tropical/Salsa Album of the Year, Female."

== Track listing ==
No.	Title	Writer(s)	Music	Length
1.	"Por Ese Hombre" (with Víctor Manuelle and Tito Nieves)	Roberto Galán, Lucía Galán	Eddie Arroyo, Luis Columna	4:59
2.	"Esa"	Alejandro Jaén, Jose Morín, William Paz	Humberto Ramirez	4:55
3.	"Cuando Me Haces el Amor" (Ballad Version)	Alberto Carrion	Alejandro Jaén	4:22
4.	"Love On A Two Way Street"	Bert Keyes, Sylvia Robinson	José Gazmey	4:41
5.	"Tentacion" (Spanish Hip-Hop Tropical Version)	Rudy Pérez, Billy Mann	Rudy Pérez	3:09
6.	"Rabia" (Bolero Son)	B.B. Toledo	Alejandro Jaén	3:32
7.	"Gata Bajo la Lluvia"	Rafael Pérez-Botija	Humberto Ramírez	4:43
8.	"Cuando Me Haces El Amor" (Tropical Version)	Carrion	Eddie Arroyo, Luis Columna	4:57
9.	"Lo Que El Viento Se Llevo"	Pérez, Mark Portman	Humberto Ramirez	4:50
10.	"Temptation" (English Hip-Hop Son Version)	Pérez, Mann	Rudy Pérez	3:09
11.	"Love On A Two Way Street" (Spanish Rap Version)	Keyes, Robinson	José Gazmey	4:41
12.	"Tentacion" (Son Montuno Version)	Pérez, Mann	Rudy Pérez	3:10
Total length:				51:02

== Charts ==
=== Weekly charts ===
Chart (2002)	Peak Position
US Top Latin Albums (Billboard)	28
US Tropical/Salsa Albums (Billboard)	3

=== Year-end charts ===
Chart (2002)	Position
US Tropical/Salsa Albums (Billboard)	14

== Personnel ==
- N. Amador - Assistant Engineer
- Gustavo Arenas - Arranger, Keyboards
- Eddie Love Arroyo - Arranger, Producer, Vocal Arrangement
- Richard Bravo - Percussion
- Ed Calle - Horn, Saxophone
- Jason Carder - Trumpet
- Oskar Cartaya - Bass
- Luis Columna - Arranger, Producer, Vocal Arrangement
- Tony Concepcion - Trumpet
- Mike Couzzi - Mixing
- Sal Cuevas - Bass
- Rafael "Tito" DeGracia - Timbales
- Gerard Dure - Hair Stylist
- Jose Luis Estrada - Engineer
- Jorge Fonseca - A&R, Engineer
- Carlos Franco - Guitar
- Sammy García - Congas
- Jose Gazmey - A&R, Concept, Producer, Vocal Director
- J.B. Hernandez - Bass
- Alejandro Jaén - Producer
- Bert Keyes - Composer
- Carlos Laurenz - Engineer
- Oscar Llord - Concept, Executive Producer
- Angel Lopez - Vocals (Background)
- Lunna - Vocals
- Billy Mann - Programming, Vocals
- Victor Manuelle - Performer
- Lewis A. Martineé - Engineer
- Aris Martinez - Vocals (Background)
- Vladimir Meller - Engineer
- Miami Symphonic Orchestra - Strings
- Raul Midón - Vocals
- Dave Miranda - Vocals
- Tito Nieves - Performer
- Joel Numa - Engineer
- Alfredo Oliva - Concertmaster
- Javier Oquendo - Bongos
- Richie Perez - Engineer
- Rudy Pérez - Arranger, Guitar, Producer, Vocals
- Clay Perry - Arranger, Keyboards, Programming
- Cheito Quinonez - Vocals
- Leo Quintero - Guitar (Acoustic)
- Humberto Ramírez - Arranger, Producer, Trumpet
- Jose Luis Ramos - Vocals
- Tony Rijos - Guitar
- Miguel Rivera - Trombone
- Héctor Ivan Rosa - Engineer
- J. Salazar - Arranger
- Martin Santiago - Bass
- Simon Simantob - Assistant Engineer
- Dana Teboe - Trombone
- Ramiro Teran - Vocals
- Richard Trinidad - Keyboards, Piano
- Camilo Valencia - Brass Arrangement, Horn Arrangements
- Victor Vazquez - Trombone
- Jose "Che" Vega - Percussion
- Eliud Velázquez - Percussion
- Dan Warner - Guitar (Electric)
- Bruce Weeden - Engineer, Mixing
- Barry Yee - Photography
