= Desahogo =

Desahogo may refer to:

- Desahogo (Vico C album), 2005
- Desahogo (Pilar Montenegro album), 2001
