= Pickin' Up Pieces =

- Polydor 12" released in the Netherlands

Single by Brenda K. Starr

from the album I Want Your Love
- Released: 1985
- Recorded: Shakedown Studios
- Genre: Freestyle, electro
- Length: 6:38
- Label: Mirage/Atlantic (U.S.)
- Songwriters: Lotti Golden, Arthur Baker
- Producer: Arthur Baker

"Pickin' Up Pieces" is the lead single from Brenda K. Starr's debut album, I Want Your Love, released in 1985 by Mirage Records. The song was produced by Arthur Baker, who co-wrote it with Lotti Golden. The single, released in 1985, was a sizable hit on the Dance/Club Songs chart. It reached a peak of #9 on that chart the same year, and also managed to chart on the R&B chart at the time - reaching a peak of #83.

The single was an early Freestyle release - marked with syncopated rhythms and intense synthetic production. Lyrically, the song is about "Picking up the pieces" and moving on after a failed relationship.
