= I Still Believe (Brenda K. Starr song) =

1988 single by Brenda K. Starr

Single by Brenda K. Starr

from the album Brenda K. Starr
- B-side: "All Tied Up"
- Released: 1988
- Recorded: 1987
- Genre: Pop; R&B; freestyle
- Length: 3:50
- Label: MCA
- Songwriters: Antonina Armato; Giuseppe Cantarelli
- Producer: Eumir Deodato

Brenda K. Starr singles chronology
"Breakfast in Bed" (1987)	"I Still Believe" (1988)	"What You See Is What You Get" (1988)

Music video
- "I Still Believe" on YouTube

"I Still Believe" is a song written and composed by Antonina Armato and Giuseppe Cantarelli, and originally recorded by pop singer Brenda K. Starr for her second studio album, Brenda K. Starr. It is a ballad in which the singer is confident she and her ex-boyfriend will reunite one day. It is Starr's biggest hit in the United States, reaching the top twenty on the Billboard Hot 100 and being considered her signature song. "I Still Believe" was covered by American singer Mariah Carey, a former backup singer for Starr before she achieved success, for her #1's album in 1998 and released as a single in 1999.

== Background and authorship/composition ==
After releasing her first record, I Want Your Love (1985), and not achieving success with it, Brenda K. Starr recorded "I Still Believe" as one of the songs for her self-titled second album, which was released in 1987. The song was written and composed by Antonina Armato and Giuseppe Cantarelli, and produced by Eumir Deodato. It is a pop ballad based on a real-life moment that occurred in Armato's life involving an ex-boyfriend who proposed marriage to her, but she turned him down because she felt that the timing was not right. He was upset, and then he gave her an ultimatum to either marry him or the relationship would be over. Even though Armato loved her boyfriend at the time, she stuck to her convictions and the relationship ended. To deal with her emotional pain, Armato co-wrote and composed the song with Cantarelli.

== Reception ==
Justin Kantor of Allmusic praised the track for being "passionately dramatic and heartfelt". It was released as the second single from Starr's self-titled album in 1988, and peaked at number 13 on the U.S. Billboard Hot 100, becoming Starr's first—and only—top twenty single on the Hot 100. Its music video comprises scenes of Starr singing the song in a warehouse intercut with scenes of her walking past many romantic couples. Starr also recorded the song in Spanish, as "Yo Creo En Ti," which she released as a single. In 1998, she recorded a salsa version of the song on her album No Lo Voy a Olvidar, as "I Still Believe/Creo en Ti." The Spanish version peaked at number 20 on the Billboard Latin Tropical Airplay chart.

== Charts ==
=== Weekly charts ===
Chart (1988–1989)	Peak position
Canada Top Singles (RPM)	54
US Billboard Hot 100	13
US Adult Contemporary (Billboard)	14
US Adult Contemporary (Radio & Records)	10
US Contemporary Hit Radio (Radio & Records)	15
US Hot Latin Songs (Billboard); Spanish version: "Yo Creo En Ti"	10
Chart (1999)	Peak position
US Tropical Songs (Billboard) "I Still Believe/Creo en Ti"	20

=== Year-end charts ===
Chart (1988)	Rank
US Billboard Hot 100	93

== Mariah Carey version ==
"I Still Believe"

Single by Mariah Carey

from the album #1's
- Released: February 8, 1999
- Recorded: Late 1998
- Studio: Doppler Studios (Atlanta, Georgia); Right Track Recording (New York City)
- Genre: R&B; pop
- Length: 3:55
- Label: Columbia
- Songwriters: Antonina Armato; Giuseppe Cantarelli
- Producers: Mariah Carey; Stevie J; Mike Mason

Mariah Carey singles chronology
"When You Believe" (1998)	"I Still Believe" (1999)	"Heartbreaker" (1999)

Music videos
- "I Still Believe" on YouTube; "I Still Believe/Pure Imagination" (Damizza Reemix) on YouTube

=== Background and release ===
While choosing new material to record for her first compilation, #1's, Mariah Carey decided to cover "I Still Believe" as a tribute to Brenda K. Starr, as she had been Starr's backing singer in the late 1980s and Starr had helped jump-start Carey's career by handing a demo tape to CBS Records executive Tommy Mottola, who had then signed Carey to her first recording contract. She explained that the song "reminds me of the fact that not long ago I was a teenage girl with nothing to my name but a demo tape, my voice, and my ability to write songs. Brenda K. Starr treated me like a 'star' and gave me a shot." During an interview for Entertainment Tonight, she further commented:

"I'm really glad that I got a chance to remake the song 'I Still Believe,' because the album is called '#1's' and this is the first song that I sang as a professional singer. I would go on the road with Brenda. I was a little skinny kid with no money that she took under her wing and she was so nice to me. I auditioned to be her back-up singer and she hired me and she used to bring me clothes and food, and she really took care of me like a big sister. A lot of people wouldn't have done that. The main thing was that she believed in me and it's really hard to get people to listen to your tapes. [...] She was always real cool and helpful and supportive. I always loved this song. When I sing it now, it reminds me of those times."

"I Still Believe" was released as the compilation's second single in the United States on February 8, 1999. In the United Kingdom, the track was released as two CD singles and a cassette single on March 29, 1999. Carey's version derives from both pop and R&B music, being produced by Carey with Stevie J and Mike Mason. According to EMI Music Publishing, the song was written in the key of G major and set in a moderately slow tempo of 59 beats per minute, while Carey's vocal range from G_{3} to D_{6}.

==== Remixes ====
A remix of the song was produced by Carey and Damizza titled "I Still Believe/Pure Imagination", which was included on the CD single with the original version and three other remixes, released on February 23, 1999. It differs significantly from the original, as it retains none of the music and only minor lyrical elements. The melody is based heavily on interpolations of the song "Pure Imagination", which Gene Wilder sang, in character as Willy Wonka, in the 1971 film Willy Wonka & the Chocolate Factory, and the song features rapped and sung parts by Krayzie Bone (of Bone Thugs-N-Harmony) and Da Brat. An abbreviated version of "I Still Believe/Pure Imagination", without Da Brat and more from Krayzie Bone, can be found on Bone's album Thug Mentality 1999. According to Jose F. Promis of Allmusic, "[t]he mix is, nonetheless, breezy, laid-back, and typical of mid-'90s urban/hip-hop, and features da Brat saying "lose the ego," all the while self-aggrandizing herself."

Several other remixes of the song were created, and each was carefully overseen by Carey, who re-recorded her vocals for all of them. Stevie J, who co-produced the original song, enlisted the help of rappers Mocha and Amil to join Carey on a remix he was developing. Although it contains completely new musical elements (with no music derived from the original and only small lyrical elements), Carey, Stevie J and the rappers do not receive songwriting credit. David Morales created several remixes of the song, including the "Classic Club" mix. It retains the song's original music and chord progressions with Carey's original vocals and considerable ad libs. Other remixes by Morales include The King's Mix and the Eve of Souls mix, which do not contain complete vocals of the song, and feature little more than ad libs over club beats.

=== Critical reception ===
Professional ratings
Review scores
Source	Rating
AllMusic	2.5/5 stars
Entertainment Weekly	B+
The Hinckley Times	1/10
Peterborough Herald and Post	2/5
Stereogum	4/10

Carey's version received mostly positive reviews from music critics. Chuck Taylor of Billboard praised the track for featuring "one of the most relaxed, breeziest vocal performances Miss Mariah has ever served up, alongside a simple arrangement that allows her voice to shine through." Taylor also noted that "[t]he track also ably walks the line between R&B and pop: For listeners who may have lost the faith with Carey's ventures into hip-hop, this will reel them back into the fold. But it's also no step backward. Newer fans will love the less-glossy production and the soulful grip that Carey puts around this song of yearning and ache." Devon Powers of PopMatters called it "a noteworthy cover even if you can’t recall who did it first." Stephen Thomas Erlewine of Allmusic picked the track as one of the best on her compilation The Ballads (2008), calling it a "mammoth hit." Meanwhile, Jose F. Promis of the same publication compared both versions, writing that Carey's version "pales somewhat in comparison to Starr's more passionate interpretation." He was positive with the "Morales' Classic Club Mix", describing it as "a standard, but well-made dance remake, [...] quite smooth, with Carey giving a great vocal performance."

=== Chart performance ===
Unlike the preceding single from #1's, "When You Believe," "I Still Believe" enjoyed more success within the United States than elsewhere, peaking at number four on the Billboard Hot 100. Though it was Carey's first single to chart on radio airplay points alone, its airplay was relatively low while sales were much stronger, "due to the maxi-single's packaging and marketing, which [...] contained five completely distinct versions," noted Allmusic's Promis. On the radio, the song managed to reach the top-ten in three charts: the Adult Contemporary (number eight), the Hot R&B/Hip-Hop Songs (number three) and the Rhythmic chart (number eight), only losing the top-twenty on the Mainstream Top 40 (number 21). The song became Carey's seventh single to top on the Hot Dance Club Play. It was certified platinum by the RIAA, and was ranked 36 on the Billboard Year-End Hot 100 singles of 1999 and 23 on her 25 Top Billboard Hit Songs list. It also entered the top ten in Canada (number nine) and Spain (number seven).

Elsewhere, the song was a moderate success. It reached the top twenty on the UK Singles Chart (number sixteen), becoming her nineteenth top twenty single. It reached the top-forty in four other countries, Belgium (Wallonia) (number twenty-five), France (number thirty-three), New Zealand (twenty-four) and Switzerland (thirty-one). In Australia, "I Still Believe" was Carey's first song to miss the top fifty since "Forever" had missed it there in 1997.

=== Music videos ===
The single's music video, which Brett Ratner directed, was shot in early December 1998 and drew heavy inspiration from Marilyn Monroe's 1953 visit to U.S. troops in Korea for a United Service Organizations show. It shows Carey (who emulates Monroe's make-up and hairstyles) visiting Edwards Air Force Base in California and singing for airmen and soldiers, while standing on a fighter jet, as Monroe had done during the Korean War. It premiered on January 12, 1999, on MTV's Total Request Live, as well as on Entertainment Tonight.

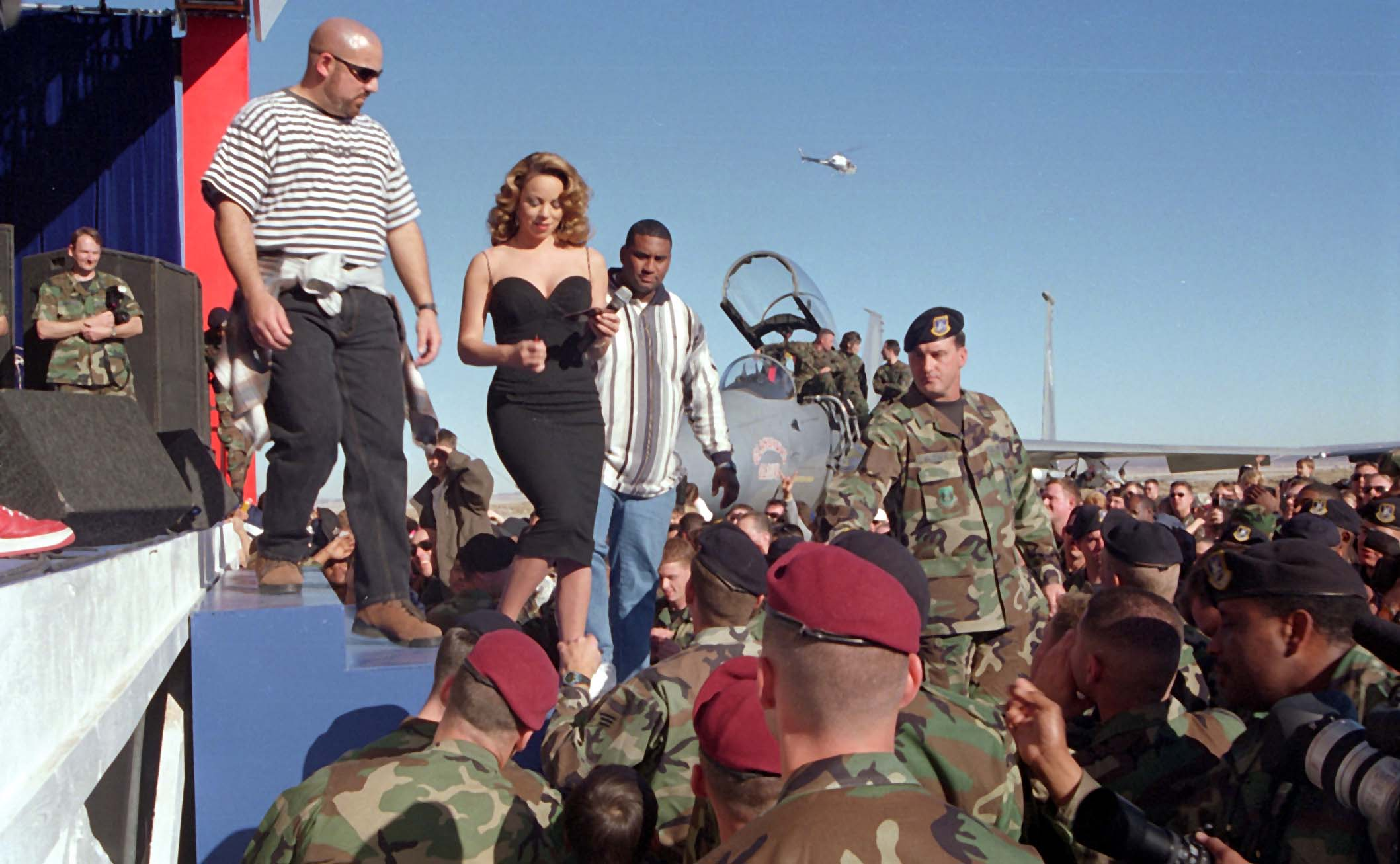
Carey on the set of the music video for "I Still Believe," in December 1998

In an interview during the set of the music video, Carey commented:

"Brett Ratner is directing the video and he's a good friend of mine and he's also doing some great work right now. [...] We were talking and I wanted it to be a live performance and we just started going back and forth and I was saying how a lot of people in the service had written me letters and talked about various songs. 'Hero' being one of them. I remember when I put my first album out, people would write who were stationed overseas. It was in the winter of 1990, which was around the time of the Gulf War, so a lot of people were writing about listening to the album. I always used to watch old footage of performers going overseas, from Bob Hope to Marilyn Monroe singing for people in the service. I thought this would be a nice thing to do. So, we're doing the video but I'm going to do some more songs if I have it in me."

The video garnered mixed reviews, while Emmanuel Hapsis of KQED Arts picked it as her eighth best video, calling it "amazing," Chuck Taylor of Billboard gave a "C" rating, writing that "[s]eeing Carey coo and kiss and flip her neck to a series of faux surprised smiles, however, does make you wonder if you're watching a music video or a glamour shoot for Seventeen." Taylor also claimed that Mariah "never looked better, but [she's] too good a singer for such cheesy posturing." A video for the remix was commissioned and directed by Carey herself, showing her as a peasant girl in a Mexican village as she tends to her goats and gathers water for her family. Bone is portrayed as a pariah of sorts in the town, in whom Carey may have a romantic interest. Da Brat takes on the role of the community gringo, as she arrives in a car with a lot of money.

=== Formats and track listings ===
European 2-track CD single

1. "I Still Believe" — 3:55
2. "I Still Believe" (Morales' Classic Club Mix Edit) — 3:51

US 2-track CD, cassette and 7-inch vinyl single

1. "I Still Believe / Pure Imagination" (feat. Krayzie Bone & Da Brat - Damizza Reemix) — 4:32
2. "I Still Believe" (Morales' Classic Club Mix Edit) — 3:51

Australian cassette maxi-single

1. "I Still Believe" — 3:55
2. "I Still Believe" (Morales' Classic Club Mix Edit) — 3:51
3. "I Still Believe" (The Eve of Souls Mix) — 10:53

UK CD maxi-single 1

1. "I Still Believe" (Morales' Classic Club Mix Edit) — 3:51
2. "I Still Believe" (Morales' Classic Club Mix - UK Edit) — 6:57
3. "I Still Believe" (The Eve of Souls Mix - UK Edit) — 8:53

UK CD maxi-single 2

1. "I Still Believe" — 3:55
2. "I Still Believe" (feat. Mocha & Amil - Stevie J. Remix) — 5:04
3. "I Still Believe / Pure Imagination" (feat. Krayzie Bone & Da Brat - Damizza Reemix) — 4:32

UK cassette single

1. "I Still Believe" (Morales' Classic Club Mix Edit) — 3:51
2. "I Still Believe" — 3:55

European CD maxi-single 1

1. "I Still Believe" — 3:55
2. "I Still Believe" (Morales' Classic Club Mix Edit) — 3:51
3. "I Still Believe" (Morales' Classic Club Mix) — 9:05
4. "I Still Believe" (The Eve of Souls Mix) — 10:53
5. "I Still Believe" (The Kings Mix) — 8:04
6. "I Still Believe" (The Kings Mix Instrumental) — 8:05

European CD maxi-single 2

1. "I Still Believe" — 3:55
2. "I Still Believe / Pure Imagination" (feat. Krayzie Bone & Da Brat - Damizza Reemix) — 4:32
3. "I Still Believe" (feat. Mocha & Amil - Stevie J. Remix) — 5:04
4. "I Still Believe" (feat. Mocha & Amil - Stevie J. Clean Remix) — 5:04
5. "I Still Believe / Pure Imagination" (Damizza Reemix Acapella) — 4:32

US CD and cassette maxi-single; Japanese CD maxi-single

1. "I Still Believe" — 3:55
2. "I Still Believe" (feat. Mocha & Amil - Stevie J. Clean Remix) — 5:04
3. "I Still Believe" (Morales' Classic Club Mix) — 9:05
4. "I Still Believe / Pure Imagination" (feat. Krayzie Bone & Da Brat - Damizza Reemix) — 4:32
5. "I Still Believe" (The Kings Mix) — 8:04

Australian CD maxi-single

1. "I Still Believe" — 3:55
2. "I Still Believe" (Morales' Classic Club Mix Edit) — 3:51
3. "I Still Believe" (The Eve of Souls Mix) — 10:53
4. "I Still Believe / Pure Imagination" (feat. Krayzie Bone & Da Brat - Damizza Reemix) — 4:32
5. "I Still Believe" (feat. Mocha & Amil - Stevie J. Clean Remix) — 5:04

European 12-inch vinyl single (remixes)

1. "I Still Believe" (Morales' Classic Club Mix) — 9:05
2. "I Still Believe" (The Kings Mix) — 8:04
3. "I Still Believe / Pure Imagination" (feat. Krayzie Bone & Da Brat - Damizza Reemix) — 4:32
4. "I Still Believe" (feat. Mocha & Amil - Stevie J. Remix) — 5:04

US 2× 12-inch vinyl single (remixes)

1. "I Still Believe" (Morales' Classic Club Mix) — 9:05
2. "I Still Believe" (The Kings Mix) — 8:04
3. "I Still Believe / Pure Imagination" (feat. Krayzie Bone & Da Brat - Damizza Reemix) — 4:32
4. "I Still Believe" (feat. Mocha & Amil - Stevie J. Remix) — 5:04

MC30 digital EP

1. "I Still Believe" — 3:54
2. "I Still Believe / Pure Imagination" (feat. Krayzie Bone & Da Brat - Damizza Reemix) — 4:32
3. "I Still Believe / Pure Imagination" (feat. Krayzie Bone & Da Brat - Damizza Reemix Acapella) — 4:32
4. "I Still Believe" (feat. Mocha & Amil - Stevie J. Clean Remix) — 5:04
5. "I Still Believe" (feat. Mocha & Amil - Stevie J. Remix) — 5:04
6. "I Still Believe" (feat. Mocha & Amil - Stevie J. Remix Acapella) — 5:04
7. "I Still Believe" (Morales' Classic Club Mix) — 9:04
8. "I Still Believe" (Morales' Classic Club Mix UK Edit) — 6:59
9. "I Still Believe" (Morales' Classic Club Mix Edit) — 3:51
10. "I Still Believe" (The Eve of Souls Mix) — 10:53
11. "I Still Believe" (The Eve of Souls Mix UK Edit) — 8:53
12. "I Still Believe" (The Kings Mix) — 8:04
13. "I Still Believe" (The Kings Mix Instrumental) — 8:05

=== Charts ===
==== Weekly charts ====
Chart (1999)	Peak position
Australia (ARIA)	54
Belgium (Ultratop 50 Flanders)	48
Belgium (Ultratop 50 Wallonia)	25
Canada Singles (Nielsen SoundScan)	9
Canada Top Singles (RPM)	21
Canada Adult Contemporary (RPM)	12
Canada Contemporary Hit Radio (BDS)	30
European Hot 100 Singles (Music & Media)	30
France (SNEP)	33
France Airplay (SNEP)	8
Germany (GfK)	58
Hungary (MAHASZ)	2
Hungary Airplay (HCRA)	20
Netherlands (Dutch Top 40 Tipparade)	2
Netherlands (Single Top 100)	51
New Zealand (Recorded Music NZ)	24
Poland Airplay (Music & Media)	16
Puerto Rico (Notimex)	4
Scottish Singles Sales (Official Charts)	23
Spain (PROMUSICAE)	7
Spain Airplay (Music & Media)	5
Switzerland (Schweizer Hitparade)	31
UK Singles (Official Charts)	16
UK Hip Hop/R&B (Official Charts)	4
UK Airplay (Music Control)	50
US Billboard Hot 100	4
US Adult Contemporary (Billboard)	8
US Crossover (Billboard) "I Still Believe/Pure Imagination" featuring Krayzie Bone and Da Brat	20
US Adult Contemporary (Radio & Records)	6
US CHR/Pop (Radio & Records)	19
US CHR/Rhythmic (Radio & Records)	7
US Dance Club Songs (Billboard)	1
US Dance Singles Sales (Billboard)	2
US Hot Latin Songs (Billboard)	39
US Hot R&B/Hip-Hop Songs (Billboard) "I Still Believe/Pure Imagination" featuring Krayzie Bone and Da Brat	3
US Pop Airplay (Billboard)	21
US NAC/Smooth Jazz (Radio & Records)	22
US Rhythmic Airplay (Billboard)	8
US Top 40 Tracks (Billboard)	20
US Urban (Radio & Records)	16
US Urban AC (Radio & Records)	17

==== Year-end charts ====
Chart (1999)	Position
Brazil (Crowley)	92
Canada Adult Contemporary (RPM)	65
Romania (Romanian Top 100)	31
US Billboard Hot 100	36
US Adult Contemporary (Billboard)	26
US Adult Contemporary (Radio & Records)	24
US CHR/Pop (Radio & Records)	97
US CHR/Rhythmic (Radio & Records)	52
US Dance Club Songs (Billboard)	40
US Dance Singles Sales (Billboard)	13
US Hot R&B/Hip-Hop Songs (Billboard) "I Still Believe/Pure Imagination"	41
US NAC/Smooth Jazz (Radio & Records)	67
US Mainstream Top 40 (Billboard)	95
US Rhythmic (Billboard)	43
US Urban (Radio & Records)	89

=== Certifications and sales ===
Region	Certification	Certified units/sales
United States (RIAA)	Platinum	860,000

=== Release history ===
Release dates and formats
Region	Date	Format(s)	Label	Ref.
Canada	February 8, 1999	CD	Columbia	
United States	February 9, 1999	12-inch vinyl; maxi CD	Columbia	
United States	February 23, 1999	7-inch vinyl; cassette; CD; maxi cassette	Columbia	
Taiwan	February 25, 1999	Maxi CD	Sony Music Taiwan	
Japan	March 10, 1999	Maxi CD	Sony Music Japan	
United Kingdom	March 29, 1999	Cassette; maxi CD	Columbia	
Various	September 4, 2020	Digital download; streaming (EP)	Legacy	
