= Sweetheart (Rainy Davis song) =

1986 single by Rainy Davis

"Sweetheart" is a song originally recorded by American singer Rainy Davis. It was written by Davis and Pete Warner, and produced with Dorothy Kessler. The track was released in 1986 by independent record label SuperTronics as a single from Davis's 1987 studio album Sweetheart. A freestyle, hip hop pop, and synth-funk song, "Sweetheart" appeared on R&B and dance music-based record charts in the United States.

American singer Mariah Carey recorded a cover version with American rapper Jermaine Dupri (credited as JD) for his debut album, Life in 1472 (1998), and her first greatest hits album, #1's (1998). So So Def and Columbia Records released it as the third single from the former album on September 7, 1998. Carey was inspired to create a remake of "Sweetheart" as she liked listening to the song as a teenage girl. Critics categorized the cover as a dance, hip-hop, and R&B song, and its instrumental features synths and bass runs. The lyrics describe a woman's desire for a person with whom to share a romance.

Carey's "Sweetheart" was promoted with a music video directed by Hype Williams in Spain. Although American and British music magazines predicted it would experience success on major record charts, its performance in those countries was restricted to the US Billboard Bubbling Under Hot 100 and UK club charts due to the absence of a commercial release. It fared better in mainland Europe, where it charted in the top twenty on Dutch, German, and Swiss record charts. In reviewing "Sweetheart", music critics focused on Carey's vocal performance, Dupri's rapping style, and the cover's perceived sexual nature.

== Rainy Davis original ==
"Sweetheart"

Single by Rainy Davis

from the album Sweetheart
- Released: 1986
- Genre: Freestyle; hip hop pop; synth-funk
- Length: 6:56
- Label: SuperTronics
- Songwriters: Denise L. Davis; Pete Warner
- Producers: Warner; Davis; Dorothy Kessler

Rainy Davis singles chronology
"Sweetheart" (1986)	"Lowdown So & So" (1987)

"Sweetheart" is a freestyle, hip hop pop, and synth-funk song recorded by American singer Rainy Davis from her debut album, Sweetheart (1987). Davis and Pete Warner wrote the lyrics, composed the melody, and produced it with Dorothy Kessler. It was mixed by Tony Humphries. SuperTronics, a Brooklyn-based independent record label, issued the song in early 1986. A representative from the label stated that the release was part of a strategy to expand beyond promoting songs made for dance clubs by finding and issuing ones suitable for radio airplay. The radio edit has a runtime of three minutes and forty-seven seconds, and the 12-inch vinyl single is six minutes and fifty-six seconds long.

"Sweetheart" appeared on R&B and dance music-based record charts in the United States. According to a 2020 Billboard article, it experienced minor success on the former. The song peaked at numbers twenty-three, twenty-four, and twenty-seven, respectively, on charts published by Cash Box, Billboard, and Radio & Records magazines. Reflecting on its commercial performance, a writer for the Hartford Advocate newspaper described it as a "huge club/dance hit". In 1986, "Sweetheart" ranked at number thirty-two on Billboard's year-end 12-inch Singles Sales chart.

Critics commented on the song's production and Davis's vocals. Upon its single release in 1986, Billboard published several reviews. The magazine as a whole described it as "rhythmically intricate", dance writer Brian Chin favored the song's "unpressured beat and nice overall polish", and R&B writer Nelson George compared Davis's vocals to those of Lisa Lisa on Lisa Lisa and Cult Jam's "I Wonder If I Take You Home". Writing for the Hartford Advocate in 1987, George Lane named it the best song on Sweetheart for its restrained production which he thought showcased her voice well.

1986 US weekly chart performance
Chart (Publisher)	Peak position
12-inch Singles Sales (Billboard)	13
Club Play (Billboard)	42
Hot Black Singles (Billboard)	24
12-inch Dance Singles (Cash Box)	15
Black Contemporary (Cash Box)	23
Black/Urban (Radio & Records)	27

1986 US year-end chart performance
Chart (Publisher)	Peak position
12 Inch Singles Sales (Billboard)	32

== Jermaine Dupri and Mariah Carey version ==
"Sweetheart"

Single by Jermaine Dupri and Mariah Carey

from the album Life in 1472 and #1's
- Released: September 7, 1998
- Studio: Krosswire Studio (Atlanta, Georgia); The Hit Factory (New York City); Right Track Recording (New York City)
- Genre: Dance; hip hop; R&B
- Length: 4:22
- Label: So So Def; Columbia
- Songwriters: Rainy Davis; Pete Warner
- Producers: Mariah Carey; Jermaine Dupri

Jermaine Dupri singles chronology
"Money Ain't a Thang" (1998)	"Sweetheart" (1998)	"Going Home with Me" (1998)

Mariah Carey singles chronology
"My All" (1998)	"Sweetheart" (1998)	"When You Believe" (1998)

Music video
- "Sweetheart" on YouTube

=== Background ===
According to Carey, after divorcing Sony Music CEO Tommy Mottola following the release of her sixth studio album Butterfly (1997), she negotiated an exit from Columbia Records. The earliest release from the multi-year deal was her greatest hits album, #1's. As Columbia planned to release it for the 1998 Christmas shopping season, Carey did not want the album's release to come across as purely commercial. She included four new songs, one of which was a cover of "Sweetheart". Carey felt that covering a song she liked as a teenager in school would be appreciated by other young girls. She conceptualized the remake with Dupri, with whom she had collaborated on songs such as "Always Be My Baby". The duet was announced in February 1998 to be included on his debut studio album Life in 1472, which was released that July. In November, it appeared as the first song on #1's.

=== Music and lyrics ===
The single version of "Sweetheart" is four minutes and twenty-two seconds long. Commentators classified it as a dance, hip-hop, and R&B song. It also contains elements of electro-funk and pop music. Dana Jon Chappelle and Brian Frye recorded the cover at KrossWire Studio in Atlanta, Georgia, and The Hit Factory and Right Track Recording in New York. Trey Lorenz, Melonie Daniels, and MaryAnn Tatum provided background vocals. The song was produced by Dupri and Carey, mixed by Dupri and Phil Tan at Silent Sound Studios in Atlanta, and mastered by Bernie Grundman. In a 2018 interview regarding his production discography, Dupri named "Sweetheart" the song he most wished to redo as he "would have made it a little more ghetto".

The lyrics of the song describe a woman's desire for a person with whom to share a romance. Carey yearns, "Baby, won't you be my sweetheart / And we could share a storybook romance", to which Dupri responds through ad-libs and a rapped verse. Synths and bass runs are featured prominently throughout the song. They disappear during the bridge as Carey sings, "A full moon is waiting in the twilight". An explicit introduction in the album version of the song on Life in 1472, in which Carey talks to Dupri on the phone about "fucking", is omitted in subsequent releases.

=== Release ===
"Sweetheart" was promoted as the third single from Life in 1472 and the lead single from #1's. So So Def and Columbia Records released it to American urban contemporary radio stations on September 7, 1998, followed by rhythmic contemporary stations eight days later. A commercial release in the United States scheduled for September 29 was retracted for unspecified reasons and instead distributed for free with the purchase of #1's. Spin reported that DreamWorks and Arista Records were concerned that the song might cannibalize sales of their impending release, Carey's duet with Whitney Houston, "When You Believe".

Dupri, Carl-So-Lowe, Lil Jon, Mark Picchiotti, and Eddie Arroyo produced remixes that appeared on several releases. In the United Kingdom, Columbia issued a promotional 12-inch vinyl of the Picchiotti mixes. Sony Music Taiwan released a commercial CD maxi single subtitled "The Story" on October 14, 1998, followed by Sony Music Japan on November 6, 1998. CD and CD maxi singles were issued in Belgium on November 2, 1998. The Lil Jon remix was later included on an enhanced CD of Carey's 1999 single "Heartbreaker". The song appears on some of Carey's subsequent compilation albums such as Greatest Hits (2001) and The Remixes (2003). In September 2020, as part of her campaign anticipating The Rarities, a digital extended play of "Sweetheart" was released.

=== Critical reception ===
Critics commented on Carey's vocal performance and Dupri's rapping, many praising Carey's restrained singing style. (Note: Attributed to Vincent Stephens in Popular Music and Society, Ron Rollins of the Dayton Daily News, and the Bristol Post.) Writing for the Popular Music and Society journal, Vincent Stephens thought this helped make "Sweetheart" one of her best R&B songs. According to Ron Rollins of the Dayton Daily News, it demonstrates her confidence in her vocal abilities. Other reviewers commented on how well Dupri's rapping complemented Carey's singing, and some argued that the song was more a showcase for Carey than Dupri. The Baltimore Sun's J. D. Considine said "Carey's effortless carnality makes Jermaine Dupri's sex-obsessed rap seem almost silly". In contrast, Time's Christopher John Farley felt the two complemented each other well. Andrew Unterbeger of Billboard echoed similar comments in a 2020 retrospective review. The incorporation of hip-hop elements in "Sweetheart" was also analyzed; in the view of Boston Globe writer Joan Anderman, they come across as sanitized.

The song's sensuality was another topic of commentary. Critics described Carey's vocals as sexy (Note: Attributed to Jeff Hall of the Camden Courier-Post and Natalie Nichols of the Los Angeles Times.) and likened her personality in "Sweetheart" to that of a vixen, a dirtier version of Lisa Lisa, and a submissive Barbie doll. (Note: By Larry Flick of Billboard, Vivian Host of the Dallas Morning News, and David Browne of Entertainment Weekly, respectively.) A few argued the song was well-suited to erotic dancing, deemed "booty-bouncing" and a strip club anthem. (Note: By Vivian Host of the Dallas Morning News and Brian McCollum of the Detroit Free Press, respectively.) Others gauged how explicit the song's lyrics were: Richard Harrington of The Washington Post opined it was more toned-down than other songs on Life in 1472; The Philadelphia Inquirer's Tom Moon felt was more explicit than most songs discussing sex. In The Indianapolis Star, Scott L. Miley said Carey's romantic advances were "unflattering".

=== Commercial performance ===
Music magazines predicted "Sweetheart" would thrive on record charts. British publication Music Week described it as the song on Life in 1472 most suited to commercial success. In the United States, Billboard thought it would be the most-played song on pop and R&B radio stations in late 1998. Following its radio release, eligibility for the US Billboard Hot 100 chart was changed to include non-commercial releases and airplay data from R&B stations. In the first week of the rule change on December 5, 1998, it entered the Bubbling Under Hot 100 at number twenty-five and remained on the chart for one week. Writing for Complex in 2013, David Drake said that the song underperformed compared to Carey's 1998 standards (Note: When "Sweetheart" was released, Carey had a streak of five consecutive number one singles on the Billboard Hot 100 dating back to 1995.) and questioned Sony's decision to cancel the September 29 commercial release. Internationally, "Sweetheart" peaked within the top twenty of record charts in Germany, Switzerland, and the Netherlands. Remixes peaked at number sixteen on the UK Record Mirror Club Chart published by Music Week.

=== Music video ===
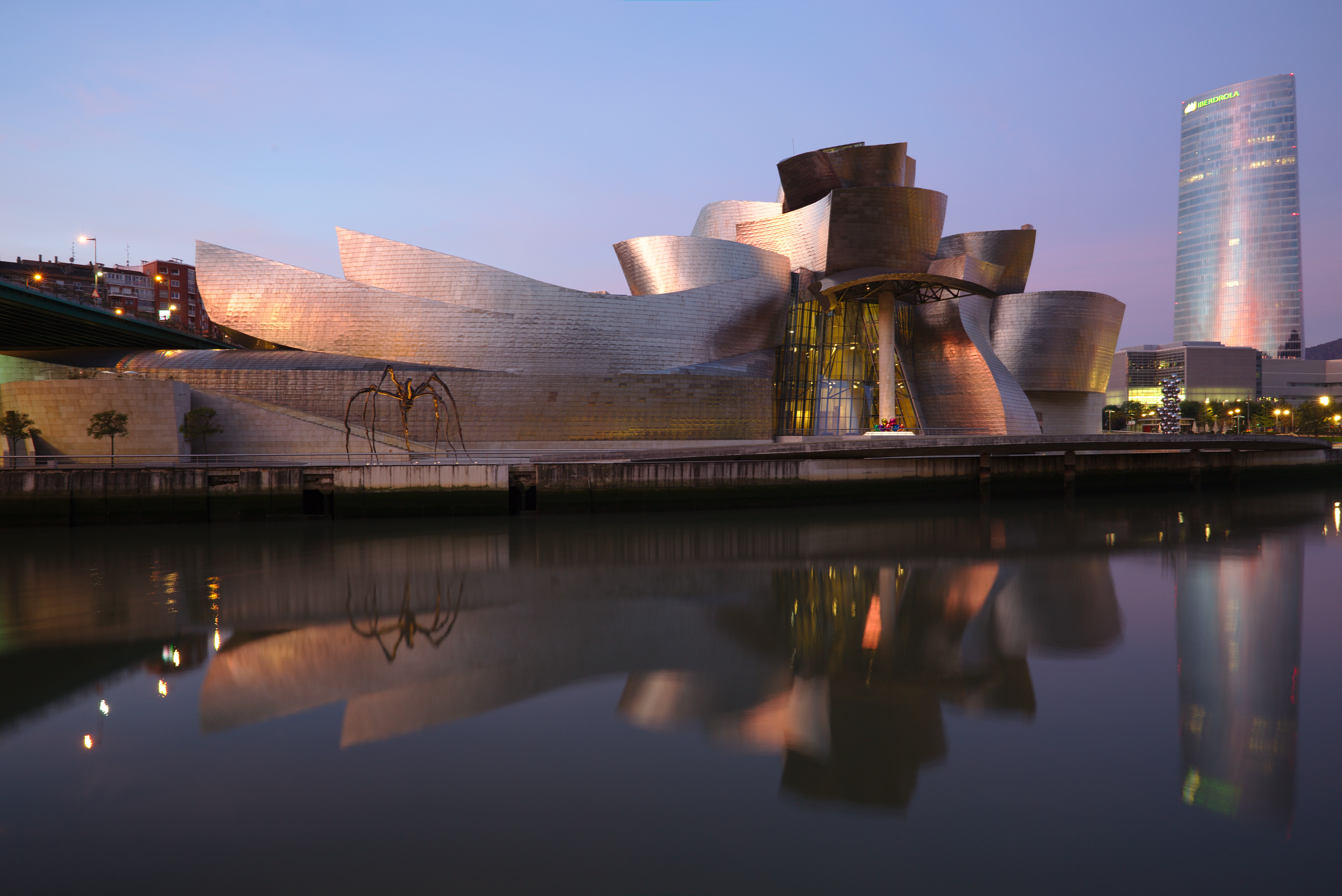
The music video for "Sweetheart" shows Dupri dancing atop the Guggenheim Museum Bilbao.

The song was promoted with a music video directed by Hype Williams. Like with many music videos for other songs by Carey such as "Honey" (1997), the video for "Sweetheart" features an exotic setting. It was shot at the Guggenheim Museum in Bilbao, Spain, in August 1998. As with other media projects filmed there, the Guggenheim was chosen for its unique appearance; Williams persuaded Carey to travel there after showing her pictures of the building. Williams had often used a fisheye lens to produce perspective distortion in past music videos, but he did not use it for "Sweetheart" because the Guggenheim, an example of architecture in the deconstructivist style, is inherently distorted.

"Sweetheart" depicts Dupri dancing on top of the museum, while Carey twirls in a dress to reveal her underwear and rides on the back of a motorcycle with her lover. She wears a metal mesh outfit that matches the museum's motif. The Morning Call's Paul Willistein called the video "even hotter" than the song itself and The Advertiser felt it would not have been filmed if Carey were still married due to the "sexy, fleshy" visuals. In her book Experiencing Music Video, scholar Carol Vernallis wrote that the Guggenheim represents a departure from the typical iconography of R&B music videos. Irene Nero stated that the video contributed to the museum's perceived celebrity-like status for its many depictions in media.

=== Personnel ===
Credits adapted from the liner notes of Life in 1472 and #1's

- Mariah Carey – vocals, producer
- Carl-So-Lowe – music performer
- Dana Jon Chappelle – engineering
- Melonie Daniels – background vocals
- Rainy Davis – songwriting
- Jermaine Dupri – vocals, mixing, producer
- Brian Frye – engineering
- Bernie Grundman — mastering
- Trey Lorenz – background vocals
- Phil Tan – mixing
- MaryAnn Tatum – background vocals
- Pete Warner – songwriting

=== Charts ===
1998 weekly chart performance
Region – Chart (Publisher)	Peak position
Belgium – Ultratip Flanders (Ultratop)	15
Europe – Eurochart Hot 100 Singles (Music & Media)	63
Germany – Top 100 Singles (Media Control AG)	15
Netherlands – Dutch Top 40 (Stichting Nederlandse Top 40)	14
Netherlands – Single Top 100 (Dutch Charts)	22
Sweden – Hitlistan (GLF)	44
Switzerland – Hitparade (Media Control AG)	18
UK – Club (Music Week) Mixes	16
UK – Pop Club (Music Week)	21
UK – Urban Club (Music Week)	2
UK – Dance Airplay (Music Week)	27
US – Bubbling Under Hot 100 (Billboard)	25
US – Hot R&B Airplay (Billboard)	45
US – Rhythmic Top 40 (Billboard)	23
US – CHR/Rhythmic (Radio & Records)	17
US – Hip-Hop (Radio & Records)	2
US – Urban (Radio & Records)	14

1998 year-end chart performance
Region – Chart (Publisher)	Position
Netherlands – Dutch Top 40 (Stichting Nederlandse Top 40)	137
US – Rhythmic Top 40 (Billboard)	92
US – CHR/Rhythmic (Radio & Records)	88
