= By Heart (Brenda K. Starr album) =

Studio album by Brenda K. Starr
- Released: August 13, 1991
- Recorded: 1990–1991
- Genre: Dance-pop, urban, freestyle
- Length: 43:38
- Label: Epic
- Producer: Stephen Broughton Lunt, Michael Jay, Guy Roche, Ric Wake, Richard Scher, Bobby Coleman

Brenda K. Starr chronology
| Brenda K. Starr (1987) | By Heart (1991) | Te Sigo Esperando (1997) |

By Heart is Brenda K. Starr's third released in 1991 on Epic Records. The only single released was "If You Could Read My Mind."

== Track listing ==
| No. | Title | Writer(s) | Length |
|---|---|---|---|
| 1. | "If You Could Read My Mind" | Bobby Coleman, Richard Scher and Michael Price | 4:49 |
| 2. | "What If" | Diane Warren, Coleman | 4:39 |
| 3. | "Never Let You Go" | Brenda K. Starr, Shelly Morgan, and Brian Morgan | 3:55 |
| 4. | "Say The Word" | Seth Swirsky and Ornie Roman | 3:38 |
| 5. | "By Heart" | Seth Swirsky | 4:03 |
| 6. | "Let's Go Undercover" | Michael Jay and Mark Leggett | 4:39 |
| 7. | "Wake Up the Neighbors" | Michael Jay | 4:09 |
| 8. | "You're All I Know" | Michael O'Hara | 4:39 |
| 9. | "What Goes On" | Stephen Broughton Lunt and Eric Beall | 4:31 |
| 10. | "You Touch Me In All The Right Places" | Bobby Coleman, Richard Scher and Michael Price | 4:41 |
