= Life in 1472 =

Studio album by Jermaine Dupri
- Released: July 21, 1998
- Recorded: 1997–1998
- Genre: Hip-hop
- Length: 59:56
- Labels: So So Def; Columbia; Sony
- Producers: Jermaine Dupri; Deric "D-Dot" Angelettie; Charlemagne; Coptic; Carl So-Lowe; DJ Quik; Slick Rick; DJ Premier; Mariah Carey; Kanye West

Jermaine Dupri chronology
Life in 1472 (1998)	Instructions (2001)

Singles from Life in 1472
- 1. "The Party Continues" Released: February 17, 1998; 2. "Money Ain't a Thang" Released: May 11, 1998; 3. "Sweetheart" Released: September 7, 1998; 4. "Going Home with Me" Released: November 23, 1998

Professional ratings
Review scores
Source	Rating
AllMusic	4/5 stars
Robert Christgau	(1-star Honorable Mention)
City Pages	(unfavorable)
Entertainment Weekly	B−
Rolling Stone	4/5 stars
SF Weekly	(unfavorable)
Vibe	(favorable)
Yahoo! Music	(favorable)

Life in 1472 is the debut studio album by American rapper and producer Jermaine Dupri, released via So So Def in the United States on July 21, 1998. 1472 refers to J (being the 10th letter of the alphabet) + D (representing the 4th letter of the alphabet), and 72 (the year of Dupri's birth, 1972). It produced the singles "Money Ain't a Thang" (US No. 52), "Sweetheart" (US No. 125), "The Party Continues" (US No. 29), and "Going Home with Me". Life In 1472 spent two weeks at number one on the Top R&B/Hip-Hop Albums chart, while breaking the top 5 on the Billboard 200 and selling 162,000 copies in its first week. The album was certified Gold by the Recording Industry Association of America (RIAA) on August 19, 1998. A platinum certification followed on September 2, 1998.

== Release and promotion ==
Life in 1472 was released on July 21, 1998, in the United States. In the United Kingdom, Columbia Records issued LPs and CDs on July 27. Sony Music Japan followed on July 29, and Sony Music Taiwan on August 5.

== Track listing ==
Life in 1472 track listing
No.	Title	Writer(s)	Producer(s)	Length
1.	"Turn It Out" (featuring Nas)	Jermaine Dupri; Nasir Jones; Kanye West	West	3:57
2.	"Money Ain't a Thang" (featuring Jay-Z)	Dupri; Shawn Carter; LaMarquis Jefferson; Rahman "R.O.C." Griffin	Jermaine Dupri	4:14
3.	"Get Your Shit Right" (featuring Madd Rapper and DMX)	Earl Simmons; Griffin; Deric "D-Dot" Angelettie; Dupri	Angelettie; Charlemagne	4:43
4.	"Fresh" (featuring Slick Rick)	Ricky Walters; Dupri	Dupri; Carl So-Lowe	3:53
5.	"Sweetheart" (featuring Mariah Carey)	Rainy Davis; MaryAnn Tanedo; Dupri; Carl So-Lowe	Dupri; Carey	4:44
6.	"Jazzy Hoes" (featuring 8Ball, Too $hort, Mr. Black & YoungBloodZ)	Dupri; Sean Joseph; Todd Shaw; Premro Smith, Marlon Goodwin; Griffin	Dupri; Lowe	4:38
7.	"Don't Hate on Me" (featuring Da Brat and Krayzie Bone)	Dupri; Shawneise Harris; Krayzie Bone	Dupri	4:17
8.	"Going Home with Me" (featuring Keith Sweat and R.O.C.)	Dupri; Griffin; Keith Sweat	Dupri	3:41
9.	"You Get Dealt Wit" (featuring Mase and Lil' Kim)	Dupri; Jefferson; Mason Betha; Kimberly Jones	Dupri; Jefferson	3:58
10.	"The Party Continues (video version)" (featuring Da Brat and Usher)	Dupri; Usher Raymond IV; Harris	Dupri	4:16
11.	"All That's Got to Go" (featuring Da Brat and Latocha Scott)	Dupri; Harris; Latocha Scott; Angelettie	Eric Coptic; Angelettie	4:05
12.	"Protector's of 1472" (featuring Snoop Dogg, R.O.C. and Warren G)	Dupri; Griffin; Calvin Broadus; Warren Griffin; Chris Martin	DJ Premier	4:46
13.	"Lay You Down" (featuring Trina & Tamara)	Rick Rubin; Joseph Simmons, Darryl McDaniels	Dupri; Manuel Seal	4:27
14.	"Three the Hard Way" (featuring Mr. Black & R.O.C.)		DJ Quik	4:17
Total length:				59:56

== Charts ==
=== Weekly charts ===
Weekly chart performance for Life in 1472
Chart (1998)	Peak position
Australian Albums (ARIA)	62
Canadian Albums (Billboard)	20
Canadian Albums (RPM)	20
Canadian R&B Albums (SoundScan)	4
Dutch Albums (Dutch Album Top 100)	96
UK Albums (OCC)	93
UK R&B Albums (OCC)	16
US Billboard 200	3
US Top R&B Albums (Billboard)	1

=== Year-end charts ===
Year-end chart performance for Life in 1472
Chart (1998)	Position
Canadian Albums (SoundScan)	153
Canadian R&B Albums (SoundScan)	23
US Billboard 200	82
US Top R&B Albums (Billboard)	24

== Certifications ==
Certifications for Life in 1472
Region	Certification	Certified units/sales
Canada (Music Canada)	Gold	50,000^{^}
United States (RIAA)	Platinum	1,000,000^{^}
^{^} Shipments figures based on certification alone.

== See also ==
- List of number-one R&B albums of 1998 (U.S.)
