= Son del Corazón =

Studio album by Pilar Montenegro
- Released: (Mexico) November 13, 1996
- Genre: Latin pop
- Label: Fonovisa
- Producer: Fernando Riba; Kiko Campos; Andrés Castillo; Carlos Del Castillo

Pilar Montenegro chronology
Son del Corazón (1996)	Desahogo (2001)

Son del Corazón (They Are from the Heart) is the first album released by Mexican singer Pilar Montenegro. It was released November 13, 1996.

This album yielded two singles: "De Amarte" and "Eres Todo Para Mí", which is a Spanish version of a Neil Sedaka single titled "You Mean Everything To Me".

== Track listing ==
All tracks written by Fernando Riba and Kiko Campos, except where noted.

1. Tira, Tira — 4:00
2. De Amarte — 2:23
3. Muéveme — 4:30
4. Eres Todo Para Mí (Neil Sedaka) — 3:29
5. Sé Sincero — 4:00
6. Son del Corazón — 3:55
7. Duende — 3:26
8. La Bruja — 3:23
9. Cuando Quieras — 3:40
10. Deshójame — 3:38
11. Eres Todo Para Mí [Spanglish] — 3:29
12. De Amarte [Club Mix] — 4:42
