= Petalos de Fuego =

Studio album by Brenda K. Starr
- Released: February 11, 2000
- Genre: Salsa
- Label: Platano

Brenda K. Starr chronology
No Lo Voy a Olvidar (1998)	Petalos de Fuego (2000)	All Time Greatest Hits (2002)

Petalos de Fuego is Brenda K. Starr's sixth studio album. It was released in the year 2000 on Platano records. Features the Top 20 hit title track.

== Track listing ==
No.	Title	Length
1.	"Petalos de Fuego"
2.	"De Hoy en Adelante"
3.	"La Razon"
4.	"Que Me Importa"
5.	"Llevame"
6.	"Por Siempre"
7.	"Te Puedo Castigar"
8.	"Petalos de Fuego" (Balada)
9.	"Honestly"

== Charts ==
Chart (2000)	Peak Position
US Tropical/Salsa Albums (Billboard)	15
