= Te Sigo Esperando =

Studio album by Brenda K. Starr
- Released: January 21, 1997
- Genre: Salsa
- Producer: Humberto Ramirez

Brenda K. Starr chronology
By Heart (1991)	Te Sigo Esperando (1997)	No Lo Voy a Olvidar (1998)

Te Sigo Esperando is the fourth album (first Spanish language) by Brenda K. Starr. It was released in early 1997, and produced by Humberto Ramirez. It features the major hit single, "Herida", a cover of Myriam Hernandez's song which reached number-one on the Latin Tropical Airplay.

== Background and recording ==
Recording for the album began after a label executive suggested that Starr record salsa music, as she had previously only recorded in the freestyle, pop and dance genres. While recording the album, Starr had problems with the pronunciation of certain words due to her inability to speak fluent Spanish.

== Track listing ==
No.	Title	Writer(s)	Length
1.	"Sola"	Jorge Piloto, Rudy Pérez	5:05
2.	"Herida"	Myriam Hernandez	4:52
3.	"Te Sigo Esperando"	Marco Flores	4:28
4.	"No Necesito"	Humberto Ramirez	4:41
5.	"Un Amor Como el Mio"	Ángel "Cucco" Peña	4:26
6.	"Peligroso Amor"	Gogo Muñoz	5:24
7.	"Keep It a Secret"	Sandy Fredrickson	4:22
8.	"No Digas Nada"	Pérez	4:44
