= Por Ese Hombre =

1985 song

"Por Ese Hombre" (For That Man) is a song originally recorded by Argentine duo Pimpinela and Spanish singer Dyango for the former's fifth studio album, Lucía y Joaquín (1985). It was covered by American singer Brenda K. Starr and Puerto Rican-American singer-songwriters Tito Nieves and Víctor Manuelle, as the lead single for Starr's seventh studio album, Temptation (2002). Mexican singer Ana Bárbara and Mexican band La Original Banda El Limón also recorded the song for Bárbara's eleventh studio album, Yo Soy La Mujer (2014).

Starr's version of the song peaked at number eleven on the Billboard Hot Latin Tracks chart and at number one on the Billboard Tropical/Salsa Airplay chart, leading the latter chart for eight consecutive weeks. It also managed to peak at number thirty-three on the Billboard Latin Pop Airplay chart. It became the fifth best-performing Tropical/Salsa Airplay song of 2002.

== Brenda K. Starr version ==
"Por Ese Hombre"

Single by Brenda K. Starr with Tito Nieves and Víctor Manuelle

from the album Temptation
- Released: February 4, 2002
- Genre: Salsa
- Length: 4:59
- Label: Sony Discos
- Songwriters: Roberto Galán; Lucía Galán
- Producers: Eddie Arroyo; Luis Columna

Brenda K. Starr singles chronology
"De Hoy En Adelante" (2001)	"Por Ese Hombre" (2002)	"Temptation" (2002)

=== Background ===
While choosing songs to record for the album, Starr decided upon songs she felt would showcase her growth and potential as an artist. She wanted to record songs from an array of diverse musical genres.

=== Musical composition ===
"Por Ese Hombre" was composed in minor key tonality. According to the Music Genome Project, the song's instrumentation is built in acoustic balladry, while its lyrics focus on romanticism. Its salsa section features the use of vocal call and response between the choir and the three performers. It has a BPM of 196 beats per minute.

=== Commercial performance ===
On the Billboard Hot Latin Tracks chart, the song debuted at number forty-eight for the week of March 23, 2002. It peaked at number eleven for the week of May 4, 2002. The following week, the song fell to number thirteen and a week later returned to its peak position of number eleven. A week after being sent to radio as the lead single from the album, "Por Ese Hombre" entered the Billboard Tropical/Salsa Airplay chart at number sixteen. Two weeks later, the song had reached the number three position of the chart. It later peaked at number one. It led the chart for eight weeks in 2002, from April 20 until June 8. The song was replaced by Chayanne's "Y Tú Te Vas". It became Starr's second number one single on the chart, following 1997's "Herida". On the Billboard Latin Pop Airplay chart, the song debuted at number thirty-nine for the week of April 20, 2002. It peaked at number thirty-three for the week of May 18, 2002.

=== Critical reception ===
At the Latin Billboard Music Awards of 2003, the song received the awards for "Hot Latin Track of the Year, Vocal Duo" and "Tropical/Salsa Airplay Track of the Year, Female." The album received a nomination for "Tropical/Salsa Album of the Year, Female." On November 25, 2009, the official music video was uploaded to Sony Music Latin's VEVO account, where it has attained over 15 million views, as of May 2012.

=== Track listing ===
- CD Single
1. "Por Ese Hombre" (Tropical Version) — 4:59
2. "Por Ese Hombre" (Call Out Hook) — 0:20

=== Charts ===
==== Weekly charts ====
Chart (2002)	Peak Position
US Hot Latin Tracks (Billboard)	11
US Latin Pop Airplay (Billboard)	33
US Tropical/Salsa Airplay (Billboard)	1

==== Year-end charts ====
Chart (2002)	Position
US Tropical/Salsa Airplay (Billboard)	5

== See also ==
- List of number-one Billboard Latin Tropical Airplay of 2002
