= Pilar Montenegro =

Mexican Latin pop singer and actress (born 1972)

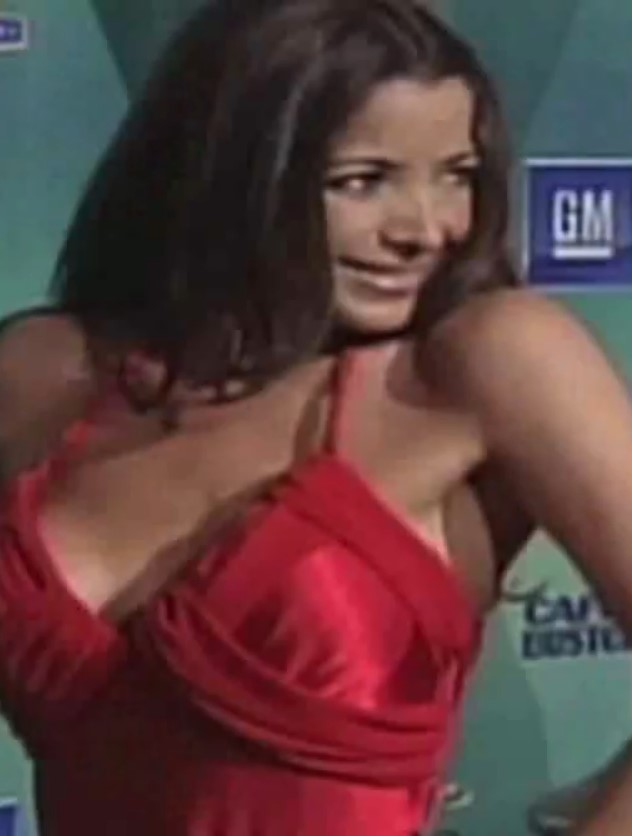
- Montenegro in 2007
- Born: María del Pilar Montenegro López; May 31, 1972 (age 54); Mexico City, Mexico
- Occupations: Singer, actress
- Years active: 1988–2015
- Spouse: Jorge Reynoso (m. 2001; div. 2004)
- Musical career
- Genres: Cumbia; Pop; Latin pop
- Instrument: Vocals
- Labels: Fonovisa; Univision Records; Universal Music Group; Golden Music, Lideres; EMI Music; Platino Records

Pilar Montenegro (Spanish pronunciation: [piˈlaɾ monteˈneɣɾo]; born María del Pilar Montenegro López on May 31, 1972, in Mexico City, Mexico) is a Mexican Latin pop singer and actress.

== Biography ==
When Montenegro was 10 years old she landed her first acting part in the TV series Juguemos A Cantar. In 1989 she joined the group Garibaldi. During the mid '90s she began to appear in soap operas and left Garibaldi to pursue a solo career. By 1996 she released her debut album Son del Corazón.

In 2001, Montenegro re-emerged into the music scene by the hand of then husband and executive music producer Jorge Reynoso, and after 6 months of recording with the music production of Rudy Perez, they released her second album Desahogo. The album produced the hit single, a cover of Yolandita Monge’s Quitame Ese Hombre. The hit single spent 13 consecutive Weeks at Number 1 on the Hot Latin Tracks of Billboard. With the success of the album "Desahogo" Pilar Montenegro won multiple awards, including 4 Latin Billboard Awards.

== Discography ==
=== Albums ===
Year	Title	Top Latin Albums	Certification
1996	Son del Corazón	—	—
2001	Desahogo	2	Platinum
2004	Pilar	34	—
2004	Euroreggaeton	—	—
2005	South Beach	—	—

=== Singles ===
Year	Title	Hot Latin Songs
1996	"De amarte"	—
1996	"Tira, Tira"	—
1997	"Eres todo para mí"	—
1997	"Sé Sincero "	—
2002	"Quitame Ese Hombre"	1
2002	"Alguien Que Una Vez Ame"	47
2002	"Cuando Estamos Juntos"	—
2004	"Prisionera"	—
2005	"Tomalo Suave" (featuring Gizelle & Don Dinero)	—
2005	"Noche De Adrenalina" (featuring Don Omar)	—

== Filmography ==
Telenovelas, Films, Theater
Year	Title	Role	Notes
1979	Anita la huerfanita		Theatrical Performance
1993	Donde queda la bolita		Film
1994-95	Volver A Empezar	Jessica	Supporting Role
1996	Marisol	Sulema Chávez	Antagonist
1998	Gotita de amor	Arcelia Olmos	Supporting Role
2003-04	Te amaré en silencio	Paola	Supporting Role
2004	Mulan		Theatrical Performance
2006	Noche de Salon Mexico		Theatrical Performance
2010	Soy tu dueña	Arcelia Olivares	Supporting Role
2012-13	Qué Bonito Amor	Wanda Mey	Special Appearance
2013	El Comitenorio		Theatrical Performance

== Awards and nominations ==
Year	Award	Category	Result
2003	Billboard Latin Music Awards	Latin Pop Airplay Track of the Year (Female) Quitame Ese Hombre	Won
2003	Billboard Latin Music Awards	Regional Mexican Airplay Track of the Year, Female Group or Female Solo Artist Quitame Ese Hombre	Won
2003	Billboard Latin Music Awards	Regional Mexican Airplay Track of the Year, New Artist Quitame Ese Hombre	Won
2003	Premio Lo Nuestro	Regional Mexican Song Quitame Ese Hombre	Won
2003	Premio Lo Nuestro	Regional Mexican Female Artist	Won
2003	Premio Lo Nuestro	Pop Female Artist	Won
2003	Premio Lo Nuestro	Pop Song Quitame Ese Hombre	Won
2003	Premio Lo Nuestro	Song of the Year Quitame Ese Hombre	Won
