= Atrevete a Olvidarme =

Studio album by Brenda K. Starr
- Released: July 11, 2005
- Recorded: 2004–2005
- Label: Boss Entertainment

Brenda K. Starr chronology
So Good: 12" Club Collection (2004)	Atrevete a Olvidarme (2005)

Atrevete a Olvidarme is Brenda K. Starr's eighth studio album, released in 2005. The album consists of Salsa and Pop. All the songs give plenty of room for Starr's unique, charismatic vocals to shine. Includes the hit singles, "Tu Eres" and the title track. "Damelo" was also released as a single but it did not chart.

== Track listing ==
No.	Title	Length
1.	"Tu Eres"
2.	"Te Voy a Enamorar" (Salsa)
3.	"Atrevete a Olvidarme"
4.	"Que Fue, Que Fue"
5.	"Damelo"
6.	"Te Voy a Enamorar"
7.	"Ya No Soy Igual" (Salsa)
8.	"Atrevete a Olvidarme" (Salsa)
9.	"Si Corazon"
10.	"Ya No Soy Igual"

== Charts ==
Chart (2005)	Peak Position
US Tropical Albums (Billboard)	9
