= I Want Your Love (album) =

Studio album by Brenda K. Starr
- Released: November 10, 1985
- Genre: Freestyle
- Length: 55:59
- Label: Mirage
- Producers: Richard Scher; Lotti Golden; Arthur Baker; Carl Sturken; Evan Rogers

Brenda K. Starr chronology
I Want Your Love (1985)	Brenda K. Starr (1987)

I Want Your Love is the debut album by American dance/pop singer, Brenda K. Starr. While it was a small label release on Mirage Records, distributed by Atlantic Records, It featured her first Freestyle music hit, "Pickin' Up Pieces," which peaked at #9 on the Hot Dance Music/Club Play chart in 1986. Other noteworthy songs on the album include "Love Me Like The First Time", which would be recorded soon after by r&b/soul artist Stacy Lattisaw. While contemporary listeners will liken this album to the similar style of Latin Freestyle, many of the songs were produced in a sleeker, more polished, electro style. While the album itself was not a blockbuster success, Starr soon found herself on MCA Records for the release of her second, self titled, studio album.

== Track listing ==
1. "Suspicion" (Lotti Golden, Richard Scher) 5:18
2. "Pickin' Up Pieces" (Golden, Arthur Baker) 4:40
3. "Look Who's Cryin' Now" (Starr, Scher, Golden) 4:57
4. "I Want Your Love" (Nile Rodgers) 4:55
5. "Boys Like You" (Golden, Scher) 6:00
6. "I Can Love You Better" (Sturken, Rogers) 5:02
7. "Love Me Like the First Time" (Frank Wildhorn, Gary Benson) 3:19
8. "You're the One For Me" (Sturken, Rogers) 4:40
9. "Pickin' Up Pieces" (long version) 6:38
10. "Pickin' Up Pieces" (instrumental) 6:28
11. "Suspicion" (remix) 6:06
12. "Suspicion" (dub version) 5:12

== Personnel ==
- Brenda K. Starr: Vocals, Rap
- MCA: Rap
- Bo Brown, BJ Nelson, Craig Derry, Will Downing, Lotti Golden, Audrey Wheeler, Cindy Mizelle, Evan Rogers: Vocal Backing
- Richard Scher: Keyboards, Synth Bass, Drum Programming, Simmons Drum Overdubs, Backing Vocals
- Andy Schwartz: Acoustic Piano
- G.E. Smith, Ira Siegel, Charlie Street, Skip McDonald: Guitars
- Carl Sturken: Guitars, Keyboards
- Doug Wimbish, John Nevin: Bass
- Arthur Baker: Bass, Drums
- Cosa: Congas
