= Rainy Davis =

American singer

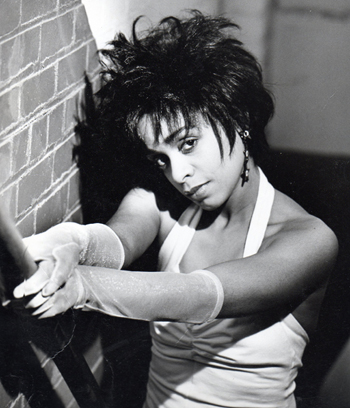
- Davis in 1989

Background information
- Birth name: Denise Lorraine Davis
- Born: Brooklyn, New York, U.S.
- Genres: R&B; pop; hip hop
- Occupations: Singer; songwriter
- Years active: 1985–present
- Labels: Supertronics; Columbia/CBS; Rainysongs Entertainment
- Website: rainysongs.com

Denise Lorraine "Rainy" Davis is an American singer and songwriter. Out of four Billboard charted singles, Rainy Davis is known best for her song "Sweetheart". The single was originally released on the New York–based independent label Supertronics Records. However, after the song became a hit in the clubs, then on urban radio and eventually crossing over to pop radio, Columbia Records A&R exec Joe McEwen offered Davis a production-artist deal for worldwide physical distribution, which included buying her previous contract from Supertronics. She went on to record two albums for Columbia and received numerous awards for her contributions to hit songs over the years.

In 2005, when digital music distribution was new to the majority of independent artists and label professionals, Davis, founder and president of Rainysongs, set up her online entertainment company with worldwide digital distribution. This was one of the first digital music distribution labels owned by an African-American woman. Davis was also one of the pioneers to structure the foundation for fair digital recording agreements in the U.S.

== Biography ==
Davis was born and raised in the Brooklyn borough of New York City. Prior to her fame, she sang with a local band called Jamilia, which included band members Keith Sweat and Charisse Davis. She later joined the female singing group Musique, created and produced by Patrick Adams, which garnered the club pop hits "In the Bush" and "Keep On Jumpin".

After a few weeks of rehearsals with their new band, Musique went out on the road, and Davis was a live performance member of the female trio group Musique with Becky Bell and Marisa Dejean. This was her first tour as a member of the group, which had two songs that hit No. 1 on the Billboard Disco Action Charts, and later crossed over to become a pop hit record. The tour was booked throughout North America by the Norby Walters Agency.

At the request of Amir Bayyan, (friend of the Jacksons), Davis wrote "Sweetheart" for Janet Jackson with her songwriting partner Pete Warner. When the demo was finished, all the songs for Jackson's 1986 album, Control, had been chosen. Amir Bayyan, Christine Bayyan, and Chris Lord-Alge suggested to Davis that she release the song herself and it became a major hit in the dance and club scene and on urban and pop radio.

Columbia Records signed Davis in 1987 and dubbed her "America's Sweetheart", then sent her on a national tour to support her debut album. The tour included an appearance on Don Cornelius's TV show Soul Train and a performance at the Apollo Theatre in Harlem, New York. Davis was also a presenter at the Rhythm & Blues awards at Bally's in Las Vegas.

Davis remains a creative force in the entertainment industry and is a Grammy-nominated songwriter, accomplished music publisher, producer, and recording artist. Her publishing company Rainysongs, is a member of ASCAP and holds controlling interests in the Sweetheart copyrights. Collectively with various album releases by Mariah Carey and Jermaine Dupri with the inclusion of "Sweetheart", album sales exceed 22 million physical records worldwide. Davis's additional production and songwriting and releases include the Cover Girls' "Spring Love" from the album Show Me; Inner Life and Jocelyn Brown's "I Want to Give You Me" from I'm Caught Up, Apollo 440's "Sweetheart" sample from the album The Descending Dudes and 275 more licenses issued by Harry Fox.

== Discography ==
=== Albums ===
| Year | Title | U.S. R&B Chart | Billboard 200 | Top Electronic Albums |
|---|---|---|---|---|
| 1987 | Sweetheart | 61 | | |
| 1988 | Ouch | | | |

Album credits

| Year | Title | U.S. R&B Chart | Billboard 200 | Top Electronic Albums | Top Internet Albums |
|---|---|---|---|---|---|
| 1987 | Show Me - The Cover Girls | 74 | 64 | | |
| 1998 | Life in 1472: The Original Soundtrack - Jermaine Dupri | 1 | 3 | | |
| 1998 | #1's - Mariah Carey | 6 | 4 | | |
| 2001 | Greatest Hits - Mariah Carey | 36 | 52 | | |
| 2003 | The Remixes - Mariah Carey | 25 | 26 | | 26 |
| 2003 | Dude Descending | | | | |
| 2004 | The Remixes - Mariah Carey | | | | 1 |
| 2011 | The Essential Mariah Carey | 42 | | | |
| 2013 | Greatest Hits - Mariah Carey | | 52 | | |

- I'm Caught Up (In a One Night Love Affair) - composer, publisher
- Sweetheart (1987) - primary artist, composer, producer, publisher
- Show Me (1987) - composer, producer, publisher
- Ouch (1988) - primary artist, composer, producer, publisher
- Best of 1987 - 1990 - The Cover Girls (1996) - composer, producer, publisher
- The Greatest Hits - The Cover Girls (1998) - composer, producer, publisher
- Life In 1472 - Jermaine Dupri (1998) - composer, publisher
- #1's - Mariah Carey (1998) - composer, publisher
- Greatest Hits - Mariah Carey (2001) - composer, publisher
- The Remixes - Mariah Carey (2003) - composer, publisher
- Dude Descending - Apollo 440 (2003) - composer, publisher
- Sweetheart (A Story Book Romance) (2011) - primary artist, composer, producer, publisher
- The Essential Mariah Carey (2011) - composer, producer, publisher
- Sweetheart (Collectors Edition) (2015) - primary artist, composer, producer, publisher

=== Singles ===
| Year | Title | US R&B chart | Hot Dance Music Singles Sales | Dance Music Club Play Singles | Billboard Hot 100 | Rhythmic Top 40 |
|---|---|---|---|---|---|---|
| 1986 | "Sweetheart" | 24 | 13 | 42 | | |
| 1987 | "Lowdown So & So" | 14 | 39 | 9 | | |
| 1987 | "Still Waiting" | 41 | | | | |
| 1988 | "Indian Giver" | 41 | | 16 | | |

Singles credits

- "Sweetheart" (1986) - primary artist, composer, producer, publisher
- Lowdown So & So (1986) - primary artist, composer, producer, publisher
- Spring Love - The Cover Girls (1987) - composer, producer, publisher
- Still Waiting (1987) - primary artist, producer
- 4-Ever (1987) - primary artist, composer, producer, publisher
- Indian Giver (1988) - primary artist, composer, producer, publisher
- Ouch (1988) - primary artist, composer, producer, publisher
- Storybook Romance (1993) - primary artist, composer, producer, publisher
- Sweetheart - Jermaine Dupri (1998) - composer, publisher
- Number 1's Sweetheart - Mariah Carey (1998) - composer, publisher
- CC'S Mystique (2011) - primary artist, composer, producer, publisher
