= Brenda K. Starr (album) =

Studio album by Brenda K. Starr
- Released: July 28, 1987
- Studios: 39th St. Music Studio, Z Studios, Quad Studios
- Genres: Dance-pop; R&B; freestyle
- Length: 42:19
- Label: MCA
- Producers: Stephen Broughton Lunt; Tommy Faragher; Lotti Golden; Eumir Deodato; John Morales; Sergio Munzibai; John Robie

Brenda K. Starr chronology
I Want Your Love (1985)	Brenda K. Starr (1987)	By Heart (1991)

Singles from Brenda K. Starr
- 1. "Breakfast In Bed" Released: October 1987; 2. "I Still Believe" Released: March 1988; 3. "What You See Is What You Get" Released: July 1988; 4. "Straight From the Heart" Released: 1988

Professional ratings
Review scores
Source	Rating
AllMusic	3/5 stars

Brenda K. Starr is the second album and major label debut by Brenda K. Starr.

== Release ==
Released in 1987, it produced the singles "Breakfast In Bed", "I Still Believe", and "What You See Is What You Get". The album was reissued as a Japanese import title with bonus tracks on February 24, 1999, in the United States.

== Track listing ==
No.	Title	Writer(s)	Length
1.	"Breakfast in Bed"	Lunt, Stead	4:30
2.	"You Should Be Loving Me"	Faragher, Lotti Golden	5:13
3.	"What You See Is What You Get"	Lunt, Stead	5:18
4.	"I Still Believe"	Antonina Armato, Giuseppe Cantarelli	3:50
5.	"Giving You All My Love"	Roman, Starr	5:28
6.	"Over and Over"	Klein, Sendars	3:54
7.	"Straight from the Heart"	Faragher, Lotti Golden	4:57
8.	"Drive Another Girl Home"	Knight, Sigerson	4:30
9.	"All Tied Up"	Halperi, Strauss	4:39

== Personnel ==
Credits for Brenda K. Starr adapted from AllMusic

- Steve Allen — executive producer
- Mariah Carey — background vocals
- Jocelyn Brown — background vocals
- Vivian Cherry — background vocals
- Deodato — producer
- Tommy Faragher — producer
- Lotti Golden — producer
- Connie Harvey — background vocals
- Kate Hyman — executive producer
- Jellybean — mixing
- Curtis Rance King, Jr. — background vocals
- Stephen Broughton Lunt — producer
- John Morales — arranger, producer
- Sergio Munzibai — producer
- John Robie — producer
- Brenda K. Starr — primary artist
- Janet Wright — background vocals
- Fred Zarr — mixing
- Lance McVickar — recording engineer, mixing

== Charts ==
Chart (1988)	Peak position
Billboard 200	58

=== Singles ===
Year	Single	Chart positions
Year	Single	Billboard Hot 100
1988	"I Still Believe"	13
1988	"What You See Is What You Get"	24
