= Desahogo (Pilar Montenegro album) =

Studio album by Pilar Montenegro
- Released: September 25, 2001
- Recorded: May – July 2001
- Studios: L.A. East Recording Studios (Salt Lake City, UT); North Bay Recording Studios (Miami Beach, FL); Opus 440 (Cuernavaca, Morelos, Mexico)
- Genres: Latin pop; latin ballad
- Length: 52:33
- Label: Fonovisa
- Producers: Rudy Pérez · José Behar (Exec.)

Pilar Montenegro chronology
Son del Corazón (1996)	Desahogo (2001)	Pilar (2004)

Desahogo (English: Relief) is the second studio album recorded by Mexican singer/actress Pilar Montenegro. The album was released by Fonovisa on September 25, 2001 (see 2001 in music). This album was produced by Rudy Pérez.

The album yielded two singles, "Quítame Ese Hombre", a cover from an old single by Yolandita Monge that became wildly successful in the Latin Market with Pilar's version; and "Alguien Que Una Vez Amé".

== Track listing ==
Track listing from Billboard.com

1. Cuando Estamos Juntos (Rudy Perez) — 3:43
2. Alguien Que Una Vez Amé (Rudy Perez) — 4:01
3. La Puerta del Amor (Rudy Perez/Jorge Luis Piloto) — 3:48
4. Algo Especial (Rudy Perez/Jorge Luis Piloto) — 4:19
5. Yo Sé Que Te Amo (Rudy Perez/Jorge Luis Piloto) — 4:08
6. Quítame Ese Hombre (Jorge Luis Piloto) — 3:48
7. Desahogo (Roberto Carlos/Erasmo Carlos) — 4:27
8. Y Volveré (Manuel López de la Fuente/Alan Barriere) — 4:25
9. Los Ojos No Mienten (Rudy Perez/Mark Portmann) — 3:46
10. Bella (Bebu Silvetti) — 4:39
11. Alguien Que Una Vez Amé [Ranchera] — 3:55
12. Quítame Ese Hombre [Norteña] — 4:02
13. Cuando Estamos Juntos [Club Mix Radio Edit] — 3:32

== Credits and personnel ==
=== Personnel ===
- José Behar - Executive Producer
- Ed Calle - Arranger
- Javier Carrillo - Violin
- Victor Di Persia - Recording Engineer
- Vicky Echeverri - Vocals (Background)
- Jonathon Fuzessy - Director
- Beppe Gemelli - Drums
- Piero Gemelli - Guitar (Acoustic)
- Frank González - Production Coordination
- Julio Hernández - Director
- Erick Labson - Mastering
- Michael Landau - Guitar (Electric)
- Lee Levin - Drums
- Gary Lindsay - Orchestration
- Judd Maher - Conductor
- Raúl Midón - Vocals (Background)
- Pilar Montenegro - Liner Notes
- Joel Numa - Engineer
- Mario Patiño - Production Assistant
- Wendy Pedersen - Vocals (Background)
- Rudy Pérez - Arranger, Liner Notes, Producer, Programming
- Clay Perry - Keyboards, Programming
- Mark Portmann - Guitar (Acoustic)
- Marco Antonio - Santiago Guitar
- Dana Teboe - Trombone
- Ramiro Teran - Director, Vocals (Background)
- Felipe Tichauer - Engineer
- Dan Warner - Bass, Guitar (Electric)
- Bruce Weeden - Engineer, Mixing

== Charts ==
Chart (2002)	Peak position
US Top Latin Albums (Billboard)	2
US Latin Pop Albums (Billboard)	1

== Sales and certifications ==
Region	Certification	Certified units/sales
United States (RIAA)	2× Platinum (Latin)	200,000^{^}
^{^} Shipments figures based on certification alone.
