= Brenda K. Starr =

American musician (born 1966)

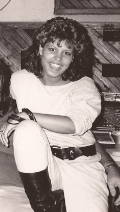
- Starr in 1984

Background information
- Born: Brenda Joy Kaplan; October 14, 1966 (age 60)
- Origin: New York City
- Genres: R&B; pop; dance; salsa; freestyle
- Occupation: Singer-songwriter
- Years active: 1985–present
- Labels: MCA; Epic; Parcha; Platano; Sony; Boss Entertainment
- Website: www.brendakstarr.com

Brenda Joy Kaplan (born October 14, 1966), known by her stage name Brenda K. Starr, is an American singer and songwriter. She is well known originally in R&B, dance and pop but now mostly in salsa-based music. She is also well known for her 1980s work with freestyle music.

== Early life ==
Starr was born as Brenda Joy Kaplan to Jewish American organist Harvey Kaplan (also known as Harvey Kaye of the 1960s band the Spiral Starecase) and a Puerto Rican mother who was Catholic.

== Career ==
In the early 1980s, through a chance meeting with Harry Belafonte, Starr landed a role in his 1984 hip hop film, Beat Street; she appeared in it, as herself, as a singer at an open-microphone audition. Starr's appearance in the movie garnered attention, leading to a recording contract on Mirage Records, through Arthur Baker, who enlisted the help of two production teams (Lotti Golden and Richard Scher, and Carl Sturken and Evan Rogers) to complete Starr's debut album, I Want Your Love. The lead single, "Pickin' Up Pieces", written by Arthur Baker and Lotti Golden, was a local club sensation and national hit, peaking at No. 9 on the Billboard Hot Dance Club Play Charts and on the Dance Singles Sales Chart. "Pickin' Up Pieces" also peaked at No. 83 on the R&B Hip Hop Billboard Charts.

Starr's eponymous second LP, which she released in 1987 on the MCA Records label before it became part of the present-day Universal Music Group, included what is considered her signature song, the power ballad "I Still Believe", which peaked at No. 13 on the U.S. Billboard Hot 100, becoming Starr's first and only top 20 single on the Hot 100. In 1998, Mariah Carey covered the song as a tribute to her "mentrix;" Carey's version peaked at No. 4 on the Billboard Hot 100 and was certified platinum by the RIAA. The album peaked at No. 58 on the Billboard 200 albums chart. Starr's other top 40 hit on the Billboard Hot 100 was "What You See Is What You Get" (which peaked at No. 24 and at No. 6 on the Hot Dance Music/Club Play).

Two of Starr's songs have been included on motion-picture soundtracks; "Sweet Surrender" was included in the soundtrack for the 1988 teen film License to Drive, starring Corey Haim & Corey Feldman, and "Sata" was on the soundtrack for the 1990 film Lambada. During the late 1980s, Mariah Carey sang background vocals for Starr, and Starr helped Carey secure a recording contract by giving a demo tape of hers to Columbia Records executive Tommy Mottola at a party. After being dropped from Sony/Columbia Records for lackluster sales of her third album, By Heart, Starr worked odd jobs to support herself and her family.

Starr learned Spanish to help rejuvenate her career, successfully reinventing herself as a salsa, tropical and Latin pop artist. After the release of her cover of "Herida" (from the Chilean singer Myriam Hernández), which peaked at No. 14 on the Latin Pop Airplay and at No. 1 on the Latin Tropical/Salsa Airplay chart, she continued her success with a string of popular albums and chart hits.

Starr was also a disc jockey at MIX 102.7, WNEW-FM, where she presented a request program titled "Under the Stars" from 9 pm to midnight on Sunday nights before the station changed formats. "Tu Eres", the lead single from her seventh album, Atrevete a Olvidarme, earned her a nomination from the Billboard Latin Music Awards in 2006.

== Personal life ==
Starr is married to Chris Petrone and has three daughters and a son. Her two eldest daughters, Kayla Festa and Tori Festa are from a previous relationship with Brazilian-born New Jersey native, João (John) Festa, while her current husband fathered her other two children: Chris Petrone Jr. and American Idol finalist (Season 15) Gianna Isabella. Gianna made it to the top 10 in American Idol's 15th season on the FOX broadcast network in 2016.

== Awards and recognitions ==
- 1997: Lo Nuestro Awards: Nominated: Tropical/Salsa Female Artist of the Year.
- 2002: Latin Grammy Awards: Nominated: Best Salsa Album for Temptation.
- 2002: Latin Grammy Awards: Nominated: Best Salsa Single for "Por Ese Hombre".
- 2006: Billboard Latin Music Awards: Nominated: Best Salsa Single for "Tu Eres".

== Discography ==
=== Albums ===
Year	Album	Peak chart positions		
Year	Album	US	US Latin	US Tropical
1985	I Want Your Love	—	—	—
1987	Brenda K. Starr	58	—	—
1991	By Heart	—	—	—
1997	Te Sigo Esperando	—	—	—
1998	No Lo Voy a Olvidar	—	—	—
2000	Pétalos de Fuego	—	—	15
2002	All Time Greatest Hits	—	—	—
2002	Temptation	—	28	3
2004	So Good: 12" Club Collection	—	—	—
2005	Atrévete a Olvidarme	—	—	9
2021	Brenda K. Starr Christmas Spectacular	—	—	—
"—" denotes releases that did not chart or were not released in that territory.

=== Singles ===
==== 1980s ====
Year	Single	Peak chart positions					
Year	Single	US	US A/C	US R&B	US Dance	US Dance Singles Sales	US Latin
1985	"Pickin' Up Pieces"	—	—	83	9	9	—
1985	"Suspicion"	—	—	—	—	—	—
1985	"Love Me Like the First Time"	—	—	—	—	—	—
1987	"Breakfast in Bed"/"Desayuno De Amor"	—	—	—	18	29	6
1988	"I Still Believe"/"Yo Creo En Ti"	13	14	—	—	—	10
1988	"What You See Is What You Get"	24	—	—	6	11	—
1988	"Straight from the Heart"	—	—	—	—	—	—
1988	"Over and Over"	—	—	—	—	—	—
1989	"You Should Be Loving Me"	—	—	—	—	—	—
"—" denotes releases that did not chart or were not released in that territory.

==== 1990s ====
Year	Single	Peak chart positions			
Year	Single	US	US Latin Pop	US Latin	US Tropical
1990	"No Matter What" (with George Lamond)	49	—	—	—
1991	"If You Could Read My Mind"	—	—	—	—
1993	"So in Love" (with Concept of One)	—	—	—	—
1995	"Thank You"	—	—	—	—
1996	"Feels So Good"	—	—	—	—
1996	"I Don't Know What To Do"	—	—	—	—
1997	"Only Love"	—	—	—	—
1997	"Herida"	—	14	28	1
1998	"Si Me Preguntan Por Tí"	—	—	31	10
1998	"I Ain't Gonna Settle For Less"	—	—	—	—
1999	"I Still Believe"	—	—	—	20
1999	"Señor Amante"	—	—	37	15
"—" denotes releases that did not chart or were not released in that territory.

==== 2000s ====
Year	Single	Peak chart positions			
Year	Single	US Dance Singles Sales	US Latin Pop	US Latin	US Tropical
2000	"Pétalos de Fuego"	—	—	—	20
2000	"La Razon"	—	—	—	—
2000	"Hold Me"	48	—	—	—
2002	"Por Ese Hombre" (with Tito Nieves and Víctor Manuelle)	—	33	11	1
2002	"Rabia"	—	—	—	11
2002	"Gata Bajo la Lluvia"	—	—	—	—
2005	"Tú Eres"	—	—	—	19
2005	"Atrévete a Olvidarme"	—	—	—	21
2006	"Dámelo"	—	—	—	—
"—" denotes releases that did not chart or were not released in that territory.

==== 2010s ====
Year	Single	Peaks
Year	Single	US Tropical
2013	"Yo te Extraño Tanto"	—
2017	"Amor Mío"	—
2017	"No Ves que te Amo" (with Domenic Marte)	23
2018	"Siento" (with Nino Segarra)	—
2019	"Rendención"	—
"—" denotes releases that did not chart.

==== 2020s ====
Year	Single	Peaks
Year	Single	US Tropical
2020	"Tu Vida en la Mia"	23
2021	"El Pez Muere por la Boca"	—
2021	"I Miss You"	—
"—" denotes releases that did not chart.

== See also ==
- List of Puerto Ricans
