= Tito Nieves =

Puerto Rican salsa musician (born 1958)

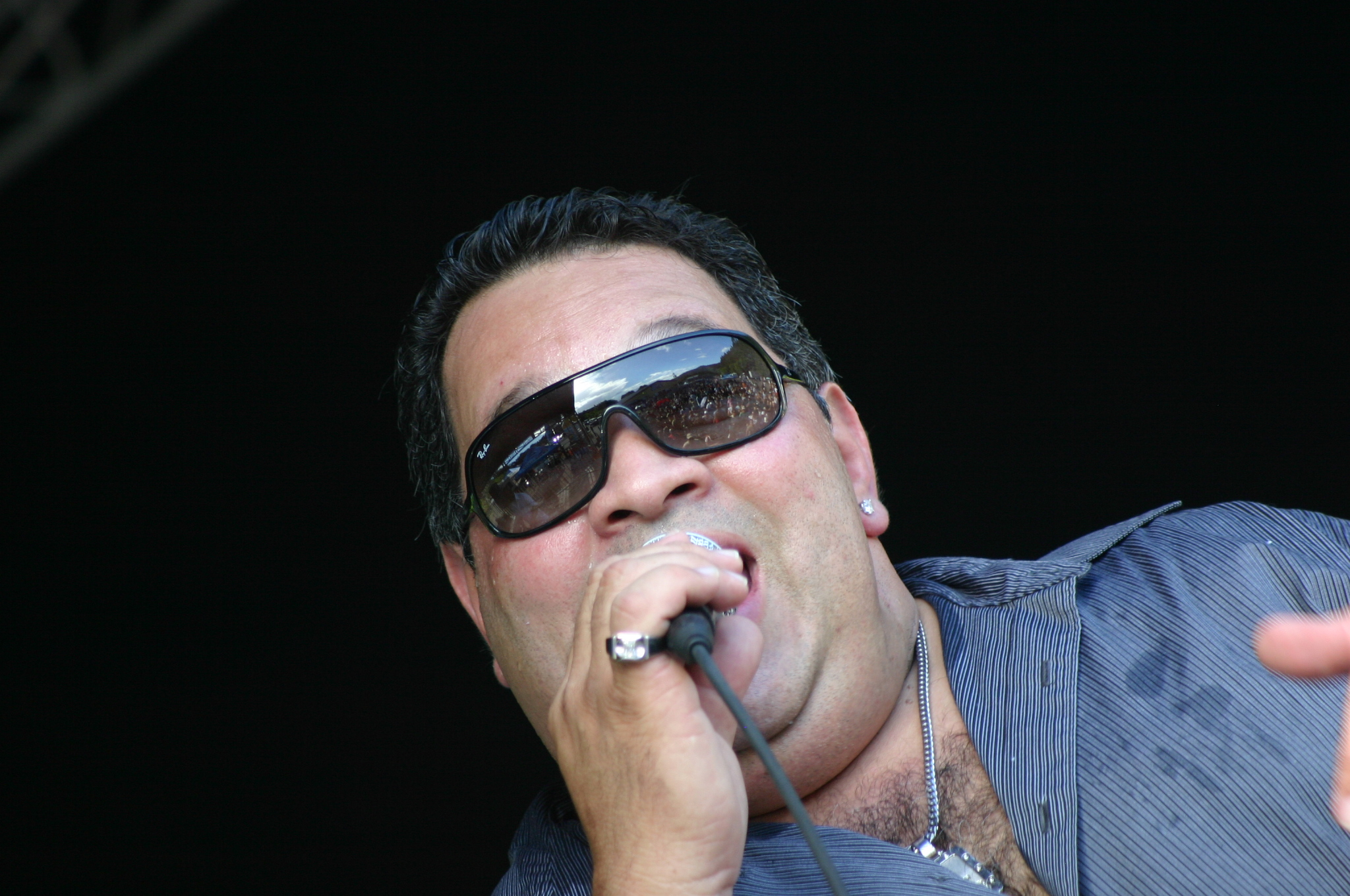
- Nieves in 2007

Background information
- Born: Humberto Nieves; June 7, 1959 (age 67); Río Piedras, Puerto Rico
- Genre: Salsa
- Occupation: Musician
- Years active: 1977–present

Humberto "Tito" Nieves (born June 4, 1958; also known as "El Pavarotti de la Salsa") is a Puerto Rican musician who became one of the leading salsa singers of the 1980s and the early 1990s.

== Early life ==
Humberto "Tito" Nieves was born in Río Piedras, Puerto Rico, and raised in the United States.

== Career ==
Nieves began his career while participating in Orquesta Cimarron, a New York–based group. In 1977, he teamed up with singer Héctor Lavoe and his Orchestra and joined the Conjunto Clasico. Later, Nieves started his solo career in 1986, setting himself apart by singing salsa in English. He is known for his hits such as "El Amor Más Bonito", "Sonámbulo", and the English-salsa hit, "I Like It Like That" produced by Sergio George and remixed by Frankie Cutlass (1996). Nieves recorded a dance-inflected rendition of the Joe Cuba song "Bang Bang", which did not reach the Billboard Hot 100.

Hits from the album Fabricando Fantasias included "Fabricando Fantasias" and "Ya No Queda Nada" with La India, Nicky Jam, and K-Mil. He attended Xaverian High School in Brooklyn, New York, where he played in a Spanish-language band named Makondo. Though he left before graduating, he was given an honorary diploma in 1994.

The main producer and musical director for most of his recorded albums was Sergio George (1988–1993, 2001–2008, 2012–2013, 2018–2020).

In 2007, he released Canciones Clasicas De Marco Antonio Solís, a tribute to Mexican singer, Marco Antonio Solís.

On August 12, 2021, Tito Nieves was the featured singer on Norberto Vélez's YouTube channel titled "Sesiones Desde La Loma Ep. 19".

== Personal life ==
Tito Nieves was married to his first wife Wanda Vazquez, and had their son Ommy Nieves, who died of bone cancer at the age of 24. He later married Irma Nieves and had Humberto Nieves Jr. Tito dedicated the song, "Fabricando Fantasias", to his deceased son. Tito married Janette Figueroa on January 28, 2017, in Puerto Rico.

== Solo albums, singles and projects ==
- The Classic (RMM 1988)
- Yo Quiero Cantar (RMM 1989)
- Déjame Vivir (RMM 1991)
- Mambo King 100th LP – Tito Puente (RMM 1991) – track "Nuestro Amor"
- Rompecabeza – The Puzzle (RMM 1993)
- Perfecta Combinacion – Familia RMM (RMM 1993) – track "Tu Por Aqui Y Yo Por Alla" with Tony Vega
- I Like It Like That Soundtrack Vol. 2 (Sony Discos 1994) – track "I Like It" with The Blackout All-Stars
- Dicen Que Soy – India (RMM 1994) – track "No Me Conviene" with India
- Un Tipo Común (RMM 1995)
- Recordando a Selena – Familia RMM (RMM 1996) – track "No Me Queda Mas"
- Tribute to the Beatles – Familia RMM (RMM 1996) – track "Let It Be" with Tito Puente
- La Jungla Latina – Tres Equis (RMM 1996) – track "Ritmo, Sabor Y Salsa" with Miles Peña & Guianko Gomez
- Watermelon Man – Charlie Sepulveda (TropiJazz/RMM 1996) – track "Hola" with Charlie Sepulveda
- De Todo Un Poco – Ray Sepulveda (RMM 1997) – track "La Dama De Mis Amores" with Ray Sepulveda
- I Like It Like That (RMM 1997)
- Serie Cristal Greatest Hits (RMM 1997)
- Dale Cara A La Vida (RMM 1998)
- The Sir George Collection (Sir George/WEA Latina 1998) – track "I Like It"
- Clase Aparte (RMM 1999)
- Asi Mismo Fue (RMM 2000)
- En Otra Onda (WEA Latina 2001)
- Arjona Tropical (Sony Discos 2001) – track "Tu Reputacion"
- Muy Agradecido (WEA Latina 2002)
- Temptation – Brenda K. Starr (Sony Discos 2002) – track "Por Ese Hombre" with Brenda K. Starr & Victor Manuelle
- 25° Aniversario con Conjunto Clasico (WEA Latina 2003)
- Fabricando Fantasías (SGZ 2004)
- Edicion Especial – Ismael Miranda (SGZ 2005) – track "Eterno Nino Bonito" with Gilberto Santa Rosa & Ismael Miranda
- Hoy, Mañana, y Siempre (SGZ 2005)
- Soy Diferente – India (SGZ 2006) – track "No Es Lo Mismo" with India
- Canciones Clasicas De Marco Antonio Solís (La Calle 2007)
- En Vivo (La Calle 2007)
- Dos Canciones Clasicas De Marco Antonio Solís (Machete/Universal 2008)
- Entre Familia (ZMG 2010)
- Mi Última Grabación (TNM 2011)
- Que Seas Feliz (Top Stop 2012)
- Mis Mejores Recuerdos (Top Stop 2013)
- En Dos Idiomas (Tito Nieves Creations 2015)
- Canciones Que No Se Olvidan (Tito Nieves Creations 2017)
- Navidad A Mi Estillo (Tito Nieves Creations 2017)
- New Tradiciones (Bridge Music, District Eleven, Provident Distribution 2017) – track "Aires de Navidad" with Adrienne Houghton
- Una Historia Musical – with Sergio George (Nu America 2018)
- Voy a Extrañarte (Tito Nieves Creations 2020)
- Si Tu Te Atreves with Daniela Darcourt (Tito Nieves Creations 2020)
- Trancao (Tito Nieves Creations 2020)
- Colegas – Gilberto Santa Rosa (InnerCat 2020) – track "La Familia" with Gilberto Santa Rosa
- Legendario (Tito Nieves Creations 2021)

== See also ==
- List of Puerto Ricans
