= Your Selection =

Compilation album by Miho Nakayama
- Released: March 7, 2001
- Recorded: 1986–1999
- Genre: J-pop; kayōkyoku; dance-pop; teen pop; city pop; pop rock
- Language: Japanese
- Label: King Records

Miho Nakayama chronology
Manifesto (1999)	Your Selection (2001)	Collection IV (2006)

Singles from Your Selection 1
- 1. "Love Clover" Released: April 8, 1998; 2. "A Place Under the Sun" Released: May 19, 1999

Your Selection (ユア・セレクション, Yua Serekushon) is a series of four compilation albums by Japanese entertainer Miho Nakayama, released through King Records on March 7, 2001. Each enhanced CD uses a soap bar motif for the cover and includes a music video of the last track of the disc.

== Your Selection 1 ==
Your Selection 1 compiles Nakayama's eight most popular songs, as voted on her homepage in late-2000, plus the singles "Love Clover" and "A Place Under the Sun". The album peaked at No. 28 on Oricon's albums chart and sold over 9,000 copies.

=== Track listing ===
No.	Title	Lyrics	Music	Arrangement	Length
1.	"You're My Only Shinin' Star"	Toshiki Kadomatsu	Kadomatsu	Kadomatsu; Kazuo Ōtani (strings); Shin Kazuhara (brass)
2.	"Tōi Machi no Doko ka de..." ((遠い街のどこかで…; "Somewhere in a Distant City..."))	Mika Watanabe	Hideya Nakazaki	Nakazaki
3.	"Sekaijū no Dare Yori Kitto (Miho Nakayama & Wands)" ((世界中の誰よりきっと; "Surely More Than Anyone in the World"))	Show Wesugi; Miho Nakayama	Tetsurō Oda	Takeshi Hayama
4.	"Anata ni Nara..." ((あなたになら…; "For You..."))	Nakayama	Joe Hisaishi
5.	"Tada Nakitaku Naru no" ((ただ泣きたくなるの; "I Just Feel Like Crying"))	Yurie Kokubu; Nakayama	Masaki Iwamoto	Iwamoto
6.	"Hurt to Heart (Itami no Yukue)" ((Hurt to Heart〜痛みの行方〜; "Hurt to Heart ~Whereabouts of Pain"))	Keiko Yokoyama	Yokoyama	Jerry Hey
7.	"Mirai e no Present (Miho Nakayama with Mayo)" (Mirai e no Purezento (未来へのプレゼント; "A Present for the Future"))	Mayo Okamoto; Nakayama	Okamoto	Tomoji Sogawa
8.	"March Color" (Māchi Karā (マーチカラー))	Nakayama; Masato Odake	Yūko Ōtaki	Shinya Naitō
9.	"Love Clover"	Takuro; Nakayama	Takuro	Takuro
10.	"A Place Under the Sun"	Nakayama	Yoshimasa Inoue	Inoue

=== Charts ===
Chart (2001)	Peak position
Japanese Albums (Oricon)	28

== Your Selection 2 ==
Your Selection 2 consists of the 10 most popular B-sides, as voted by fans. The album peaked at No. 62 on Oricon's albums chart and sold over 5,000 copies.

=== Track listing ===
No.	Title	Lyrics	Music	Arrangement	Length
1.	"Heart no Switch wo Oshite" (Hāto no Suitchi wo Oshite (ハートのスイッチを押して; "Press the Heart Switch"))	Takashi Matsumoto	Kyōhei Tsutsumi	Motoki Funayama
2.	"Sanctuary" (Sankuchuari (サンクチュアリ〜Sanctuary〜))	Yumi Yoshimoto	Anri	Ogura; Kazuo Ōtani (strings)
3.	"Dream"	Issaque	Inoue	ATOM
4.	"Sekaijū no Dare Yori Kitto (Part II)"	Wesugi; Nakayama	Oda	Hayama
5.	"Holiday"	Mami Takubo	Masaya Ozeki	URAN
6.	"I Love You"	Nakayama	Cindy	Hey
7.	"Angel"	Nakayama; Odake	Maria	Hajime Mizoguchi
8.	"Darlin'"	Nakayama	Chika Ueda	Etsuko Yamakawa
9.	"Empty Pocket"	Nakayama; Odake	Takuro	Kōichi Korenaga; Mizoguchi
10.	"Noon Noon"	Nakayama	Mr. Moon; Inoue	Inoue

=== Charts ===
Chart (2001)	Peak position
Japanese Albums (Oricon)	62

== Your Selection 3 ==
Your Selection 3 features the 10 most popular non-single songs, as voted by fans. The album peaked at No. 67 on Oricon's albums chart and sold over 4,000 copies.

=== Track listing ===
No.	Title	Lyrics	Music	Arrangement	Length
1.	"By-By My Sea Breeze"	Shun Taguchi	Toshinobu Kubota	Funayama
2.	"Kabin" ((花瓶; "Vase"))	Kadomatsu	Kadomatsu	Kadomatsu
3.	"Koiiro"	Nakayama	Nakayama	Sogawa
4.	"Shiroi Suna no La Mer" (Shiroi Suna no Ra Mēru (白い砂のラ・メール; "La Mer in the White Sand"))	Gorō Matsui	Kenjirō Sakiya	Sakiya
5.	"Treasure"	Yui Nishiwaki	Nishiwaki; Yōko Orihara	Nobuo Ariga
6.	"Mayonaka no Kitchen kara" (Mayonaka no Kitchin kara (真夜中のキッチンから; "From the Kitchen at Midnight"))	Nakayama	Pfeifer Broz	Pfeifer Broz
7.	"Futtari no Photograph" ((ふったりのphotograph; "Two Photographs"))	Nakayama	KNACK	KNACK
8.	"Itazura ni Mane Shitari..." ((いたずらに まねしたり…; "Imitate It Mischievously..."))	Chara; Nakayama	Chara	Yūsuke Asada
9.	"Title"	Kōki Okada; Taka Satō; Yūsuke Gotō; (To Be Continued)	To Be Continued	To Be Continued
10.	"Yossha! [Live Version]" ((ヨッシャ!; "Yeah!"))	Issaque	Inoue

=== Charts ===
Chart (2001)	Peak position
Japanese Albums (Oricon)	67

== Your Selection 4 ==
Your Selection 4 features select tracks from Mid Blue, Deep Lip French, Groovin' Blue, and Olive. The album peaked at No. 68 on Oricon's albums chart and sold over 4,000 copies.

=== Track listing ===
All lyrics are written by Miho Nakayama, except where indicated.

No.	Title	Lyrics	Music	Arrangement	Length
1.	"Sweet n' Sour Soup"	Odake	Maria	Jai Widing
2.	"Spiritual Kisses"		Watanabe	Kanichirō Kubo; Watanabe
3.	"It's More"	Nakayama; Odake	Inoue	Jun Irie
4.	"The Eternities"		Keisuke Araki	Shigeo Miyata
5.	"Tsuki no Ring" (Tsuki no Ringu (月のリング; "Moon Ring"))		M. Rie	Shinya Naitō
6.	"Chīsana Taiyō (Carrot Red)" ((小さな太陽 -CARROT RED; "Little Sun (Carrot Red)"))		Naitō	Naitō
7.	"Shining for You"		Ueda	Naitō
8.	"Baby Pink Moon"		Yoshinobu Takeshita	Takeshita
9.	"Kowareta Lime" (Kowareta Raimu (コワレタ ライム))	Nakayama; Odake	Naitō	Naitō
10.	"Jasmine (Shiawase na Kokoro)" ((Jasmine〜しあわせなこころ; "Jasmine ~ Happy Heart"))		Cindy	Takefumi Haketa

=== Charts ===
Chart (2001)	Peak position
Japanese Albums (Oricon)	68
