= Collection III =

Compilation album by Miho Nakayama
- Released: March 1, 1995
- Recorded: 1991–1994
- Genre: J-pop; dance-pop; pop rock; R&B
- Length: 52:58
- Language: Japanese
- Label: King Records

Miho Nakayama chronology
Pure White Live '94 (1994)	Collection III (1995)	Mid Blue (1995)

Singles from Collection III
- 1. "Tada Nakitaku Naru no" Released: February 9, 1994; 2. "Hero" Released: December 14, 1994

Collection III (コレクション・スリー, Korekushon Surī) is the seventh compilation album by Japanese entertainer Miho Nakayama. Released through King Records on Nakayama's birthday of March 1, 1995, the album compiles her singles from 1991 to 1994, including her Japanese-language cover of Mariah Carey's "Hero". The popularity of the million-selling songs "Sekaijū no Dare Yori Kitto" and "Tada Nakitaku Naru no" helped boost the album's sales.

The album peaked at No. 3 on Oricon's albums chart. It sold over 590,000 copies and was certified Platinum by the RIAJ, becoming Nakayama's biggest-selling album in her career.

== Track listing ==
No.	Title	Lyrics	Music	Arrangement	Length
1.	"Kore kara no I Love You" ((これからのI Love You; "This Is I Love You"))	Gorō Matsui	Kenjirō Sakiya	ATOM; Sakiya (strings)	5:57
2.	"Rosa"	Issaque	Yoshimasa Inoue	ATOM	5:13
3.	"Tōi Machi no Doko ka de..." ((遠い街のどこかで…; "Somewhere in a Distant City..."))	Mika Watanabe	Hideya Nakazaki	Nakazaki	5:57
4.	"Mellow"	Issaque	Inoue	Inoue	5:52
5.	"Sekaijū no Dare Yori Kitto (Miho Nakayama & Wands)" ((世界中の誰よりきっと; "Surely More Than Anyone in the World"))	Show Wesugi; Miho Nakayama	Tetsurō Oda	Takeshi Hayama	4:07
6.	"Shiawase ni Naru Tame ni" ((幸せになるために; "To Be Happy"))	Yūho Iwasato; Nakayama	Toshifumi Hinata	Hinata	4:17
7.	"Anata ni Nara..." ((あなたになら…; "For You..."))	Nakayama	Joe Hisaishi	Hisaishi	5:26
8.	"Tada Nakitaku Naru no" ((ただ泣きたくなるの; "I Just Feel Like Crying"))	Yurie Kokubu; Nakayama	Masaki Iwamoto	Iwamoto	5:02
9.	"Sea Paradise (OL no Hanran)" ((Sea Paradise -OLの反乱-; "Sea Paradise -An Office Lady's Rebellion-"))	Nakayama	KNACK	ATOM	6:17
10.	"Hero"	Mariah Carey; Nakayama	Carey; Walter Afanasieff	Robbie Buchanan	4:51
Total length:					52:58

== Charts ==
Weekly charts

Chart (1995)	Peak position
Japanese Albums (Oricon)	3

Year-end charts

Chart (1995)	Peak position
Japanese Albums (Oricon)	38

== Certification ==
Region	Certification	Certified units/sales
Japan (RIAJ)	Platinum	400,000^{^}
^{^} Shipments figures based on certification alone.
