= Collection IV =

Compilation album by Miho Nakayama
- Released: February 1, 2006
- Recorded: 1995–1999
- Genre: J-pop; pop rock
- Length: 43:06
- Language: Japanese
- Label: King Records

Miho Nakayama chronology
Your Selection (2001)	Collection IV (2006)	Complete Singles Box (2006)

Singles from Collection IV
- 1. "Cheers for You" Released: May 17, 1995; 2. "Adore" Released: September 16, 1999

Collection IV (コレクション・フォー, Korekushon Fō) is the 14th compilation album by Japanese entertainer Miho Nakayama. Released through King Records on February 1, 2006, the album compiles her singles from 1995 to 1999.

The album failed to crack the top 300 on Oricon's albums chart.

== Track listing ==
No.	Title	Lyrics	Music	Arrangement	Length
1.	"Cheers for You"	Masato Odake; Miho Nakayama	Toshinobu Kubota	Camus Celli; Andres Levin	4:47
2.	"Hurt to Heart (Itami no Yukue)" ((Hurt to Heart〜痛みの行方〜; "Hurt to Heart ~Whereabouts of Pain"))	Keiko Yokoyama	Yokoyama	Jerry Hey	5:13
3.	"Thinking About You (Anata no Yoru wo Tsutsumitai)" ((Thinking About You〜あなたの夜を包みたい〜; "Thinking About You ~I Want to Wrap Your Night~"))	Masato Odake	Maria	Kazuo Ōtani	4:52
4.	"True Romance"	Odake	Yoshimasa Inoue	Hajime Mizoguchi	4:16
5.	"Mirai e no Present (Miho Nakayama with Mayo)" (Mirai e no Purezento (未来へのプレゼント; "A Present for the Future"))	Mayo Okamoto; Nakayama	Okamoto	Tomoji Sogawa	4:26
6.	"March Color" (Māchi Karā (マーチカラー))	Nakayama; Odake	Yūko Ōtaki	Shinya Naitō	3:55
7.	"Love Clover"	Takuro; Nakayama	Takuro	Takuro	5:23
8.	"A Place Under the Sun"	Nakayama	Inoue	Inoue	5:06
9.	"Adore"	Odake	Shinyo Kanazawa	Yōichi Shimada	5:07
Total length:					43:06
