= Manifesto (Miho Nakayama album) =

Studio album by Miho Nakayama
- Released: September 16, 1999
- Recorded: 1997
- Studio: Alive Recording Studio; Onkio Haus
- Genre: J-pop; pop rock; jazz
- Length: 41:21
- Language: Japanese
- Label: King Records
- Producer: Miho Nakayama; Little Creatures

Miho Nakayama chronology
Olive (1998)	Manifesto (1999)	Your Selection (2001)

Manifesto (マニフェスト, Manifesuto) is the 21st studio album by Japanese entertainer Miho Nakayama. Released through King Records on September 16, 1999, it is the seventh studio release (after One and Only, Mind Game, Merry Merry, Dé eaya, Wagamama na Actress, and Olive) to not feature a single. Manifesto features the three-member musical unit Little Creatures. This was Nakayama's last studio album until Neuf Neuf in 2019.

The album peaked at No. 29 on Oricon's albums chart and sold over 12,000 copies.

== Track listing ==
All lyrics are written by Miho Nakayama, except where indicated; all music is arranged by Little Creatures.

No.	Title	Lyrics	Music	Length
1.	"Espresso 'n' Milk"		Yoshiko Goshima	4:37
2.	"Akirumade" ((あきるまで; "Until You Get Bored"))		Mika Watanabe	5:57
3.	"Vichyssoise Flower" (Bishisowāzu Furawā (ビシソワーズ フラワー))		Watanabe	5:10
4.	"Sevillana"		Haruhiko Kawakumi	6:52
5.	"Sweetest Lover"	Mizuho Kitayama	Cindy	5:47
6.	"Mark"		Watanabe	6:43
7.	"Simple Things #22"		Shunji Mori	6:15
Total length:				41:21

== Personnel ==
- Miho Nakayama – vocals
- Little Creatures

- Takuji Aoyagi – guitar, bass, percussion
- Masato Suzuki – synthesizer programming, keyboards, bass, percussion
- Tsutomu Kurihara – drums, percussion, guitar

- Chieko Kimbara – violin (4)
- Tatsuya Murayama – viola (4)
- Tatsuya Shimogami – flugelhorn (4)
- Taqur Francia – backing vocals (4)

== Charts ==
Chart (1999)	Peak position
Japanese Albums (Oricon)	29
