= Olive (album) =

Studio album by Miho Nakayama
- Released: June 10, 1998
- Recorded: 1998
- Studio: Onkio Haus; Sedic Studio; Planet Kingdom; Crescent Studio; On Air Azabu
- Genre: J-pop; pop rock; R&B
- Length: 52:37
- Language: Japanese
- Label: King Records
- Producer: Miho Nakayama

Miho Nakayama chronology
The Remixes: Miho Nakayama Meets Los Angeles Groove (1998)	Olive (1998)	Manifesto (1999)

Olive (オリーブ, Orību) is the 20th studio album by Japanese entertainer Miho Nakayama. Released through King Records on June 10, 1998, it is Nakayama's sixth studio release (after One and Only, Mind Game, Merry Merry, Dé eaya, and Wagamama na Actress) to not feature a single.

The album peaked at No. 9 on Oricon's albums chart and sold over 34,000 copies.

== Track listing ==
All lyrics are written by Miho Nakayama, except where indicated.

No.	Title	Lyrics	Music	Arrangement	Length
1.	"Name"		Yoshiko Goshima	Shinya Naitō	4:09
2.	"Fiancé (Anata no OK, Watashi no Yes)" ((Fiancé〜あなたのok わたしのyes; "Fiancé ~ Your OK, My Yes"))	Nakayama; Reiko Minagi	Masayuki Mizutsu	Naitō	4:33
3.	"Labyrinth"		Miki Watanabe	Takefumi Haketa	4:45
4.	"El Nino"		Yoshinobu Takeshita	Takeshita	3:52
5.	"Olive no Tsubuyaki" ((Oliveの呟き; "Olive Muttering"))		Goshima	Goshima	4:28
6.	"Baby Pink Moon"		Takeshita	Takeshita	4:37
7.	"Kowareta Lime" (Kowareta Raimu (コワレタ ライム))	Nakayama; Masato Odake	Naitō	Naitō	3:57
8.	"Shōnen no Hitomi (For Knack)" ((少年の瞳〜For Knack; "A Boy's Eyes ~ For Knack"))	Nakayama; Ikuko Noguchi	Watanabe	Takefumi Haketa	4:47
9.	"Talk to Kare no Nioi" ((Talk to 彼の匂い; "Talk to His Scent"))	Nakayama; Ren Takayanagi	Makio Tada	Tada; Hiroshi Narumi	3:50
10.	"Miss You"	Odake	Naitō	Naitō	4:18
11.	"Daddy"		Cindy	Haketa	5:01
12.	"Jasmine (Shiawase na Kokoro)" ((Jasmine〜しあわせなこころ; "Jasmine ~ Happy Heart"))		Cindy	Haketa	4:20
Total length:					52:37

== Charts ==
Chart (1998)	Peak position
Japanese Albums (Oricon)	9
