= Pure White Live '94 =

Live album by Miho Nakayama
- Released: November 23, 1994 (Limited Edition); March 1, 1995 (standard release)
- Recorded: August 26–27, 1994
- Venue: Nakano Sunplaza
- Genre: J-pop; pop rock; R&B
- Length: 75:21 (Limited Edition)
- Language: Japanese
- Label: King Records
- Producer: Miho Nakayama; KNACK

Miho Nakayama chronology
Pure White (1994)	Pure White Live '94 (1994)	Collection III (1995)

Alternate cover
- Limited Edition cover

Pure White Live '94 (ピュア・ホワイト・ライブ'94, Pyua Howaito Raibu Naintī Fō) is the second live album by Japanese entertainer Miho Nakayama. Released through King Records on November 23, 1994, the album was recorded live at the Nakano Sunplaza on August 26–27, 1994, during the Miho Nakayama Concert Tour '94 "Pure White". The Limited Edition release included a photo book with highlights from the concert. The standard release, released on March 1, 1995, omits the Prologue, Epilogue, and the "Singles Medley".

The album peaked at No. 18 on Oricon's albums chart and sold over 84,000 copies.

== Track listing ==
All lyrics are written by Miho Nakayama, except where indicated; all music is composed by KNACK, except where indicated; all music is arranged by KNACK.

Limited Edition
No.	Title	Lyrics	Music	Length
1.	"Prologue" (Purorōgu (プロローグ))			0:33
2.	"Panorama"		Nakayama	6:40
3.	"Blue Stone"		Jeff Pfeifer; Rob Pfeifer	5:11
4.	"Itazura ni Mane Shitari..." ((いたずらに まねしたり…; "Imitate It Mischievously..."))	Chara; Nakayama	Chara	4:36
5.	"Sekaijū no Dare Yori Kitto" ((世界中の誰よりきっと; "Surely More Than Anyone in the World"))	Show Wesugi; Nakayama	Tetsurō Oda	4:43
6.	"MC"			1:33
7.	"Sea Paradise (OL no Hanran)" ((Sea Paradise -OLの反乱-; "Sea Paradise -An Office Lady's Rebellion-"))			6:31
8.	"MC"			2:03
9.	"Anata wo Sora e Todoketai" ((あなたを宇宙（そら）へ届けたい; "I Want to Deliver You to the Stars"))			5:34
10.	"Futtari no Photograph" ((ふったりのphotograph; "Two Photographs"))			7:28
11.	"Tada Nakitaku Naru no" ((ただ泣きたくなるの; "I Just Feel Like Crying"))	Yurie Kokubu; Nakayama	Masaki Iwamoto	5:26
12.	"Yossha!" ((ヨッシャ!; "Yeah!"))	Issaque	Yoshimasa Inoue	6:34
13.	"Pure White"			7:27
14.	"Epilogue" (Epirōgu (エピローグ))			1:28
15.	"Singles Medley [Bonus Track]" (Shinguru Medorē (シングルメドレー))	see below		9:27
Total length:				75:21

Singles Medley
No.	Title	Lyrics	Music	Length
1.	"Tsuiteru ne Notteru ne" ((ツイてるね ノッてるね; "It's Crazy, It's Knocking"))	Takashi Matsumoto	Kyōhei Tsutsumi
2.	"C"	Matsumoto	Tsutsumi
3.	"Waku Waku Sasete" ((WAKU WAKUさせて; "Excite Me More"))	Matsumoto	Tsutsumi
4.	"Iro White Blend" (Iro Howaito Burendo (色・ホワイトブレンド; "Colored White Blend"))	Mariya Takeuchi	Takeuchi
5.	"Be-Bop High School"	Matsumoto	Tsutsumi
6.	"Close Up" (Kurōzu Appu (クローズ・アップ))	Matsumoto	Kazuo Zaitsu
7.	"Witches"	Chinfa Kan	Cindy
8.	"Tōi Machi no Doko ka de..." ((遠い街のどこかで…; "Somewhere in a Distant City"))	Mika Watanabe	Hideya Nakazaki
9.	"Megamitachi no Bōken" ((女神たちの冒険; "The Adventures of the Goddesses"))	Gorō Matsui	Hideo Saitō
10.	"You're My Only Shinin' Star"	Toshiki Kadomatsu	Kadomatsu
11.	"Catch Me"	Kadomatsu	Kadomatsu
12.	"Hade!!!" ((「派手!!!」; "Flashy!!!"))	Matsumoto	Tsutsumi
Total length:				9:27

Standard release
No.	Title	Lyrics	Music	Length
1.	"Panorama"		Nakayama
2.	"Blue Stone"		J. Pfeifer; R. Pfeifer
3.	"Itazura ni Mane Shitari..."	Chara; Nakayama	Chara
4.	"Sekaijū no Dare Yori Kitto"	Wesugi; Nakayama	Oda
5.	"MC"
6.	"Sea Paradise (OL no Hanran)"
7.	"MC"
8.	"Anata wo Sora e Todoketai"
9.	"Futtari no Photograph"
10.	"Tada Nakitaku Naru no"	Kokubu; Nakayama	Iwamoto
11.	"Yossha!"	Issaque	Inoue
12.	"Pure White"

== Personnel ==
- Miho Nakayama – vocals
- Keisuke Araki – keyboards
- Yōichi Yamazaki –keyboards, piano
- Kazushi Ueda – guitar
- Masato Saitō – bass
- Hisanori Kumamaru – drums
- Tomo Yamaguchi – percussion
- Mieko Sudō – backing vocals
- Chizuru Sōya – backing vocals

== Charts ==
Chart (1994)	Peak position
Japanese Albums (Oricon)	18
