= Deep Lip French =

Studio album by Miho Nakayama
- Released: June 1, 1996
- Recorded: 1995–1996
- Studio: Westlake Recording Studios
- Genres: J-pop; pop rock
- Length: 53:08
- Language: Japanese
- Label: King Records
- Producers: Miho Nakayama; Masato Asanuma

Miho Nakayama chronology
Mid Blue (1996)	Deep Lip French (1996)	Ballads II (1996)

Singles from Deep Lip French
- 1. "Thinking About You (Anata no Yoru wo Tsutsumitai)" Released: February 16, 1996; 2. "True Romance" Released: June 7, 1996

Deep Lip French (ディープ・リップ・フレンチ, Dīpu Rippu Furenchi) is the 18th studio album by Japanese entertainer Miho Nakayama. Released through King Records on June 1, 1996, it features the singles "Thinking About You (Anata no Yoru wo Tsutsumitai)" and "True Romance". Like her previous studio releases Mellow, Wagamama na Actress, Pure White, and Mid Blue, Deep Lip French was self-produced and recorded in Los Angeles.

The album peaked at No. 13 on Oricon's albums chart and sold over 80,000 copies.

== Track listing ==
No.	Title	Lyrics	Music	Arrangement	Length
1.	"True Romance"	Masato Odake	Yoshimasa Inoue	Hajime Mizoguchi	4:14
2.	"♡ Smoke"	Miho Nakayama; Odake	Mayumi	Mayumi	4:07
3.	"Spiritual Kisses"	Nakayama	Mika Watanabe	Kanichirō Kubo; Watanabe	3:10
4.	"Angel"	Nakayama; Odake	Maria	Mizoguchi	4:32
5.	"Fui no Kiss" ((不意のKiss; "Sudden Kiss"))	Maria	Maria	Mizoguchi	4:41
6.	"It's More"	Nakayama; Odake	Yoshimasa Inoue	Jun Irie	4:41
7.	"Leicasta" (Raikasuta (ライカスタ))	Nakayama	Inoue	Irie	5:21
8.	"Sometimes"	Odake	Cindy	Hiroshi Shinkawa	5:10
9.	"Rain Ring"	Nakayama	Maria	Mizoguchi	6:10
10.	"Sound of Love"	Nakayama; Mika Watanabe	Watanabe	Keitarō Takanami	5:20
11.	"Thinking About You (Anata no Yoru wo Tsutsumitai)" ((Thinking About You〜あなたの夜を包みたい〜; "Thinking About You ~I Want to Wrap Your Night~"))	Odake	Maria	Mizoguchi	4:50
Total length:					53:08

== Personnel ==
- Miho Nakayama – vocals
- Yoko Kanno – piano (1, 4–5, 9)
- Yoshimasa Inoue – piano (1), backing vocals (6–7)
- Yoshihiro Tomonari – piano (3)
- Hidetoshi Yamada – piano (6–7)
- Daisaku Kume – piano (10)
- Kazuo Ōtani – piano (11)
- Hajime Mizoguchi – synthesizer (1, 4, 9), cello (5)
- Hiroshi Kitashiro – synthesizer (2)
- Kanichirō Kubō – synthesizer (3)
- Hideki Matsutake – synthesizer (6–7)
- Hiroshi Shinkawa – synthesizer (8)
- Keitarō Takanami – synthesizer (10)
- Naoki Suzuki – synthesizer (11)
- Toshiyuki Honma – electric piano (6–7)
- Tsuneo Imahori – guitar (1, 9)
- Masayoshi Furukawa – guitar (4)
- Fujimaru Yoshino – guitar (6–7)
- Masaki Matsubara – guitar (8)
- Shigeharu Sasago – guitar (9)
- Kazuhiko Obata – guitar (9)
- Tenji Mitsuhata – guitar (11)
- Masayuki Suzuki – bass (1, 10)
- Kenji Takamizu – bass (4, 11)
- Chiharu Mikuzuki – bass (6)
- Hideo Watanabe – bass (9)
- Nobuo Eguchi – drums (7)
- Tōru Hasebe – drums (7)
- Ikuo Kakehashi – percussion (1, 9), drums (4)
- Tomo Yamaguchi – percussion (3)
- Makoto Hirabara – saxophone (1)
- Kazutoki Umezu – saxophone (3)
- Jake H. Concepcion – saxophone (6)
- Shinichirō Hikosaka – saxophone (9)
- Katsuki Tochio – saxophone (9)
- Sai Kakukawa – saxophone (9)
- Yasushi Arai – saxophone (9)
- Hideshi Toki – saxophone (11)
- Shin Sugawara – trumpet (1)
- Eijirō Nakagawa – trumpet (1)
- Masatsugu Shinozaki Group – strings (1, 4–5, 9, 11)
- Hiroyuki Koike Group – strings (6–7, 10)
- Megumi Maruo – accordion (10)
- Kōichirō Tashiro – charango (10)
- Maria – backing vocals (4)
- Naoki Takao – backing vocals (8, 11)
- Kumi Sasaki – backing vocals (11)

== Charts ==
Chart (1996)	Peak position
Japanese Albums (Oricon)	13
