= Mid Blue =

Studio album by Miho Nakayama
- Released: September 30, 1995
- Recorded: 1995
- Studio: Westlake Recording Studios
- Genre: J-pop
- Length: 53:51
- Language: Japanese; English
- Label: King Records
- Producer: Miho Nakayama; Masato Asanuma; Cindy

Miho Nakayama chronology
Collection III (1995)	Mid Blue (1995)	Deep Lip French (1996)

Singles from Mid Blue
- 1. "Hurt to Heart (Itami no Yukue)" Released: July 21, 1995

Mid Blue (ミッド・ブルー, Middo Burū) is the 17th studio album by Japanese entertainer Miho Nakayama. Released through King Records on September 30, 1995, it features the single "Hurt to Heart (Itami no Yukue)". Like her previous studio releases Mellow, Wagamama na Actress, and Pure White, the ballad-oriented Mid Blue was self-produced and recorded in Los Angeles.

The album peaked at No. 7 on Oricon's albums chart and sold over 145,000 copies.

== Track listing ==
No.	Title	Lyrics	Music	Arrangement	Length
1.	"16 Blanco" (16 Buranko (16ブランコ))	Miho Nakayama	Maria	Hajime Mizoguchi	5:32
2.	"Love"	Nakayama; Masato Odake; Cindy	Cindy	Kenny Harris	5:16
3.	"Reminiscence" (Reminisensu (追憶 -Reminiscence-))	Nakayama; Odake	Cindy	Harris	7:23
4.	"Dakishimetai" ((抱きしめたい; "I Want to Embrace You"))	Odake	Maria	Stephen Bray	4:13
5.	"Itai" ((イタイ; "Ouch"))	Odake	Maria	Bray; Suzie Katayama (strings)	3:21
6.	"Sweet n' Sour Soup"	Odake	Maria	Jai Winding	3:41
7.	"Afternoon"	Odake	Cindy	Harris	5:00
8.	"Game Is Over"	Nakayama; Odake	Cindy	Harris; Rastine Calhoun III (horns)	5:18
9.	"Brown Shoes"	Odake	Cindy	Tom Keane	4:39
10.	"Smile Again"	Cindy	Maria	Maria	4:16
11.	"Hurt to Heart (Itami no Yukue)" ((Hurt to Heart〜痛みの行方〜; "Hurt to Heart ~Whereabouts of Pain"))	Keiko Yokoyama	Yokoyama	Jerry Hey	5:12
Total length:					53:51

== Personnel ==
- Miho Nakayama – vocals
- Jai Winding – keyboards
- Tom Keane – keyboards
- Yoko Kanno – piano
- Joe Sample – piano (8)
- Michael Landau – guitar
- James Harrah – guitar
- Curt Bisquera – drums
- Luis Conte – percussion
- Jerry Hey – flugelhorn
- Dan Higgins – flute
- Jimmy Z – harmonica
- Dwayne Benjamin – horns
- Rastine Calhoun II – horns
- Andy Cleaves – horns
- Hajime Mizoguchi – cello
- Shinozaki Masatsugu Quartet – strings
- Kenny Harris – backing vocals (3, 8)
- Priscilla – backing vocals (2)
- Olivia – backing vocals (2)
- Vivien Watson – backing vocals (2)
- Laura Watson – backing vocals (2)
- Kana Matsumoto – backing vocals (2)
- Lisa Kiff – backing vocals (2)
- Natalie Cowan-Birch – backing vocals (2)
- Cindy – backing vocals (10)
- Maria – backing vocals (10)

== Charts ==
Chart (1995)	Peak position
Japanese Albums (Oricon)	7
