= Dance Box =

Remix album by Miho Nakayama
- Released: July 25, 1991
- Recorded: 1991
- Genres: J-pop; dance-pop
- Length: 37:58
- Language: Japanese
- Label: King Records
- Producer: Akira Fukuzumi

Miho Nakayama chronology
Dé eaya (1991)	Dance Box (1991)	Miho's Select (1991)

Dance Box' (ダンス・ボックス, Dansu Bokkusu) is the second remix album by Japanese entertainer Miho Nakayama. Released through King Records on July 25, 1991, the album features six of Nakayama's songs remixed by ATOM. The first edition release included a 1991–1992 mini calendar.

The album peaked at No. 3 on Oricon's albums chart and sold over 138,000 copies.

== Track listing ==
All music is arranged by ATOM.

No.	Title	Lyrics	Music	Length
1.	"From Waku Waku Sasete"	Takashi Matsumoto	Kyōhei Tsutsumi	9:04
2.	"From Rosa"	Issaque	Yoshimasa Inoue	5:47
3.	"From Catch Me"	Toshiki Kadomatsu	Kadomatsu	5:59
4.	"From Be-Bop High School"	Matsumoto	Tsutsumi	6:36
5.	"From Mermaid"	Chinfa Kan	Cindy	6:41
6.	"From Cockatoo"	Miho Nakayama	Masaya Ozeki	3:48
Total length:				37:58

== Charts ==
Chart (1991)	Peak position
Japanese Albums (Oricon)	3
