= Yasuko Endō =

Japanese actress

- Born: October 21, 1968; Tokyo, Japan
- Died: March 30, 1986 (aged 17); Tokyo, Japan
- Cause of death: Suicide by jumping from height
- Occupations: Model, Actress
- Known for: Sukeban Deka

Yasuko Endō (遠藤康子, Endō Yasuko; October 21, 1968 – March 30, 1986) was a Japanese model and actress whose idol singer debut was derailed by her suicide at age 17. She is not to be confused with narrator Yasuko Endō (遠藤泰子) or actress Yasuko Endō (遠藤靖子).

== Biography ==
Endō was born in Kōtō-ku, Tokyo. Her subpar academic performance was her rationale for leaving elementary school in her fifth year to join the Himawari Theatre Group. In her second year of junior high school, she was scouted by Box Corporation. At the Box Corporation office, she met Miho Nakayama, who had not yet debuted. The two struck up a close friendship. Endō took night classes at Aoyama Public High School, and started her professional activities in 1983. She modeled in magazines including Hana to Yume, Olive, GORO, Deluxe Jump, Lemon Pie, Momoco, Beppin, Suppin, Heibon Punch, Penthouse Japan, THE Shashin, Deluxe Magazine, mc Sister, and The Sugar and appeared in commercials for Kentucky Fried Chicken, Sapporo Ichiban, and Nagatanien.

Having switched to Hirata Office, she made her acting debut in 1985 through the TV drama Okusama wa Furyō Shōjo!? Osanazuma. That year's broadcast of the first version of Sukeban Deka starring Yuki Saito as Saki Asamiya, Endō was recognized for her role as Ayumi Mizuchi.

== Suicide ==
Endō had been scheduled to debut as an idol singer on May 21, 1986 by performing the Riv.Star Records song "In the Distance," composed by Tetsuo Sakurai with arrangement by Yūji Toriyama and lyrics by Masako Arikawa. However, on March 30, she jumped from the roof of a seven-story building in Asakusabashi, Taito-ku and died. Earlier that day at 5:40 PM, Endō had gone with the Hirata Office manager to the café that her mother managed. There, the three had a meeting to prepare for Endō's singing debut. The meeting ended at 7:10. After chatting with her mother for about 20 minutes, Endō left the café with the words, "I'm sorry, Mama" (ママごめんね). She entered the building next to the café; left an earring on the rooftop, and jumped. At 8:34, she was found on the road by a passersby and taken to a hospital in Sumida-ku, where her death was confirmed at 9:30 PM.

Endō's mother and Hirata Office associates denied the rumor that the Office opposed the continuation of Endō's romantic relationship, and it was widely speculated that a demanding work schedule that permitted no breaks could have led to her burnout. According to Endō's mother, Endō had been acting strangely for about a month before her death. While her reading material had included Shūsaku Endō's essay Ai to Jinsei wo Meguru Dansō, she had suddenly started reading hard-boiled novels such as The Beast to Die, Senshi no Banka, and Kako (Remember). The word "death" had also emerged repeatedly in Endō's utterances. Moreover, Endō was allegedly obsessed with the lyrics of the B-side track of her scheduled debut single, "Telephone". Producer Yukio Hashi had said: "I pepped her up saying 'Eclipse Miho Nakayama', and she cheerfully and brightly replied 'Yes'. She was the kind of girl who said things directly, and even though she said so clearly, 'I'll definitely do that'...I still don't believe it even now."

Shortly after Endō's death, idol singer Yukiko Okada jumped from the roof of the Sun Music building. Endō is considered to have been the catalyst for Okada's suicide, and the term Okada and Yukko syndrome entered the Japanese popular lexicon.

== Tributes ==
Two years after Endō's death, Miho Nakayama performed a song, "Long Distance to Heaven," during a 1988 concert tour. As an homage to the title of Endō's cancelled debut single "In the Distance", Nakayama's song was intended as a requiem for Endō. Nakayama wrote the lyrics and composed the music for the song. It was included in her July 1988 album Mind Game, and mentioned in her 1991 essay collection P.S. I Love You. Without specifying Endō's name, Nakayama wrote about her in her 2009 photo essay collection Nazenara Yasashii Machi ga Atta Kara

== Roles ==
=== TV ===
- '85nen Gata Kazoku Awase (1985, TBS) as Sachiko Kubota
- Sukeban Deka as Ayumi Mizuchi
- Getsuyou Drama Land Osanadzuma Okusama wa Furyou Shoujo!? Osanadzuma (1985, CX)

=== Movie ===
- Mashō no Natsu Yotsuya Kaidan (1981)

=== Commercials ===
- Hitachi Hitachi Dryer
- Sanyō Shokuhin Sapporo Ichiban
- NEC PC
- Shiseido Hair Cologne
- Kao Corporation Essential Shampoo
- Kentucky Fried Chicken
- Nagatanien sakezushi – with Saburō Kitajima
- Toshimaen summer pool poster
