= Adore (Miho Nakayama song) =

1999 single by Miho Nakayama

Single by Miho Nakayama

from the album Collection IV
- Language: Japanese
- B-side: "Adore (For Movie); Sweetest Lover"
- Released: September 16, 1999
- Recorded: 1999
- Genre: J-pop
- Label: King Records
- Composer: Shinyo Kanazawa
- Lyricist: Masato Odake

Miho Nakayama singles chronology
"A Place Under the Sun" (1998)	"Adore" (1999)

"Adore" (アドア, Adoa) is the 39th and final physical single by Japanese entertainer Miho Nakayama. Written by Masato Odake and Shinyo Kanazawa, the single was released on September 16, 1999, by King Records.

== Background and release ==
"Adore" was used as the theme song of the 1999 Toei film Jubaku: Spellbound. Director Masato Harada approached Nakayama to record the song after listening to her single "A Place Under the Sun" and felt that the musical style would suit the film's main character Hiroshi Kitano (Kōji Yakusho).

The B-side is a re-recording of the song "Sweetest Lover". Originally featured in the 1988 album Angel Hearts, the song was rearranged by Little Creatures as part of Nakayama's 1999 album Manifesto.

"Adore" peaked at No. 35 on Oricon's weekly singles chart and sold over 11,000 copies.

== Track listing ==
8cm CD single
No.	Title	Lyrics	Music	Arrangement	Length
1.	"Adore"	Masato Odake	Shinyo Kanazawa	Yōichi Shimada
2.	"Adore" (For Movie)	Odake	Kanazawa	Shimada
3.	"Sweetest Lover"	Mizuho Kitayama	Cindy	Little Creatures
4.	"Adore" (Original Karaoke)

== Charts ==
Chart (1999)	Peak position
Oricon Weekly Singles Chart	35
