= Blanket Privacy =

Compilation album by Miho Nakayama
- Released: November 26, 1993
- Recorded: 1993
- Genre: J-pop; kayōkyoku
- Length: 55:32
- Language: Japanese; English
- Label: King Records
- Producer: Miho Nakayama; Masato Ohsumi; Ken Shiguma; Akira Fukuzumi

Miho Nakayama chronology
Wagamama na Actress (1993)	Blanket Privacy (1993)	Pure White (1994)

Singles from Blanket Privacy
- 1. "Shiawase ni Naru Tame ni" Released: April 21, 1993; 2. "Anata ni Nara..." Released: July 7, 1993

Blanket Privacy (ブランケット・プライバシー, Buranketto Puraibashī) is the sixth compilation album by Japanese entertainer Miho Nakayama. Released through King Records on November 26, 1993, the album includes seven re-recordings of Nakayama's ballads, two new singles, and three cover songs. The initial release of the album featured a holographic image of gemstones swirling around Nakayama.

The album peaked at No. 9 on Oricon's albums chart. It sold over 89,000 copies and was certified Gold by the RIAJ.

== Track listing ==
No.	Title	Lyrics	Music	Length
1.	"Shiawase ni Naru Tame ni" ((幸せになるために; "To Be Happy"))	Yūho Iwasato; Miho Nakayama	Toshifumi Hinata	4:17
2.	"Tell Me"	Mika Watanabe	Watanabe	5:03
3.	"Midnight Taxi"	Ryō Asuka	Asuka	5:19
4.	"Just My Lover"	Toshiki Kadomatsu	Kadomatsu	5:11
5.	"Megamitachi no Bōken [a Cappella Version]" ((女神たちの冒険; "The Adventures of the Goddesses"))	Gorō Matsui	Hideo Saitō	0:47
6.	"Yaban na Hōseki" ((野蛮な宝石; "Barbaric Jewel"))	Matsui	Saitō	4:57
7.	"Time After Time"	Cyndi Lauper; Rob Hyman	Lauper; Hyman	3:25
8.	"You're My Only Shinin' Star '93"	Kadomatsu	Kadomatsu	6:09
9.	"In the Morning"	Masumi Kawamura	Toshinobu Kubota	5:12
10.	"Last Scene ni Ai wo Komete" (Rasuto Shīn ni Ai wo Komete (ラストシーンに愛をこめて; "With Love in the Last Scene"))	Fumiko Okada	Kisaburō Suzuki	5:45
11.	"The Rose"	Amanda McBroom	McBroom	3:59
12.	"Anata ni Nara..." ((あなたになら…; "For You..."))	Nakayama	Joe Hisaishi	5:28
Total length:				55:32

== Charts ==
Chart (1993)	Peak position
Japanese Albums (Oricon)	9

== Certification ==
Region	Certification	Certified units/sales
Japan (RIAJ)	Gold	200,000^{^}
^{^} Shipments figures based on certification alone.
