= Wagamama na Actress =

Studio album by Miho Nakayama
- Released: June 23, 1993
- Recorded: 1993
- Studio: Westlake Recording Studios; Carve Studio; M'Bila Studio; Studio 56; Studio 55; Ground Control; Jennie's Studio; Sedic Studio; Free Studio; Delta Studio; Nichion Studio
- Genre: J-pop; pop rock; R&B; dance-pop
- Length: 50:32
- Language: Japanese
- Label: King Records
- Producer: Miho Nakayama; Masato Ohsumi; Ken Shiguma; Akira Fukuzumi

Miho Nakayama chronology
Dramatic Songs (1993)	Wagamama na Actress (1993)	Blanket Privacy (1993)

Wagamama na Actress (わがままな あくとれす, Wagamama na Akutoresu; lit. Selfish Actress) is the 15th studio album by Japanese entertainer Miho Nakayama. Released through King Records on June 23, 1993, it is Nakayama's fifth studio release (after One and Only, Mind Game, Merry Merry, and Dé eaya) to not feature a single. It was also Nakayama's second album (after Mellow) to be self-produced and recorded in Los Angeles.

The album peaked at No. 4 on Oricon's albums chart. It also sold over 145,000 copies and was certified Gold by the RIAJ.

== Track listing ==
All lyrics are written by Miho Nakayama, except where indicated.

No.	Title	Lyrics	Music	Arrangement	Length
1.	"Gakeppuchi" ((崖っぷち; "Cliff"))	Rui Serizawa	Pfeifer Broz	Pfeifer Broz; Jerry Hey (horns)	5:07
2.	"Keep Awake"		Julia	Ian Prince	4:21
3.	"A New Day"		Makoto Satō	Bruce Gaitsch	3:11
4.	"Jara Jara Switch"		M. Rie	Tom Keane; Hey (horns)	4:30
5.	"Dear My Friends"		Takashi Tsushimi	Bill Meyers	4:28
6.	"Pastel in My Heart"		Julia	Prince	5:47
7.	"Mayonaka no Kitchen kara" (Mayonaka no Kitchin kara (真夜中のキッチンから; "From the Kitchen at Midnight"))		Pfeifer Broz	Pfeifer Broz	3:07
8.	"Wagamama na Actress" (Wagamama na Akutoresu (わがままな あくとれす; "Selfish Actress"))		Chiho Kiyooka	Meyers; Hey (horns)	4:42
9.	"Horizon"	Masami Tozawa	Pfeifer Broz	Keane	4:55
10.	"Love for You"		Cindy	Cindy; Williams Broz	4:27
11.	"Konna Hi no Ame nara Daisuki (The Rain Came Down)" ((こんな日の雨なら大好き -The Rain Came Down-; "I Love the Rain on Such a Day (The Rain Came Down)"))	Nakayama; Amie	Marc Hoffman; Elliot Weiss	Ken Shiguma	5:57
Total length:					50:32

== Personnel ==
- Miho Nakayama – vocals
- Rob Pfeifer – programming (1, 7)
- Ken Shiguma – programming (11)
- Atsushi Umehara – programming (11)
- Jeff Pfeifer – keyboards (1, 7)
- Ian Prince – keyboards, programming (2, 6)
- Tom Keane – keyboards, programming (4, 9)
- Bill Meyers – keyboards, programming (5, 8)
- Reggie Turner – keyboards, programming (10)
- Hidetoshi Yamada – keyboards (11)
- Randy Waldman – piano, bass (3)
- Michael Landau – guitar (1–2, 5–9)
- Bruce Gaitsch – guitar (3)
- David Williams – guitar (4)
- John Peña – bass (6)
- Mike Porcaro – bass (9)
- Carlos Vega – drums (9)
- Andre Williams – drums (10)
- Keith Williams – drums (10)
- Chris Trujillo – percussion (1, 5, 7–8)
- Paulinho da Costa – percussion (3)
- Jerry Hey – trumpet (1, 4, 8)
- Gary Grant – trumpet (1, 4, 8)
- Bill Reichenbach Jr. – trombone (1, 4, 8)
- Dan Higgins – saxophone (1, 4), flute (7)
- Brandon Fields – saxophone (3)
- Dave Koz – saxophone (6, 9)
- Kim Hutcheroft – saxophone (8)
- Jake H. Concepcion – saxophone (11)
- Tetsuya Ochiai – strings (11)
- Hiroki Kashiwagi – strings (11)
- Jackie – backing vocals (1)
- Misa Nakayama – backing vocals (1)
- Joey Johnson – backing vocals (2)
- Warnel Johns – backing vocals (2)
- Yuiko Tsubokura – backing vocals (4, 8)
- Keiko Wada – backing vocals (4, 8)
- Junko Hirotani – backing vocals (5–6, 11)
- Kiyoshi Hiyama – backing vocals (5–6)
- Yasuhiro Kido – backing vocals (6)
- Cindy – backing vocals (10)
- Jacque Mastin – backing vocals (10)
- Don Jeffries – backing vocals (10)

== Charts ==
Chart (1993)	Peak position
Japanese Albums (Oricon)	4

== Certification ==
Region	Certification	Certified units/sales
Japan (RIAJ)	Gold	200,000^{^}
^{^} Shipments figures based on certification alone.
