= Cheers for You =

1995 single by Miho Nakayama

Single by Miho Nakayama

from the album Collection IV
- Language: Japanese
- B-side: "Cheers for You (Dance Mix)"
- Released: May 17, 1995
- Recorded: 1995
- Genre: J-pop; dance-pop
- Length: 4:47
- Label: King Records
- Composer: Toshinobu Kubota
- Lyricists: Masato Odake; Miho Nakayama
- Producer: Toshinobu Kubota

Miho Nakayama singles chronology
"Hero" (1994)	"Cheers for You" (1995)	"Hurt to Heart (Itami no Yukue)" (1995)

"Cheers for You" (チアーズ・フォー・ユー, Chiāzu fō Yū) is the 31st single by Japanese entertainer Miho Nakayama. Written by Masato Odake, Nakayama, and Toshinobu Kubota, the single was released on May 17, 1995, by King Records.

== Background and release ==
"Cheers for You" was arranged by American musicians Camus Celli and Andres Levin. The song was used by Kirin Company for their "Lager Beer Opening '95" commercial, which featured Nakayama. The music video was directed by Shunji Iwai; both Nakayama and Iwai had worked together in the 1995 film Love Letter.

"Cheers for You" peaked at No. 17 on Oricon's weekly singles chart, becoming her first single since "C" to miss the top 10. It sold over 127,000 copies and was certified Gold by the RIAJ.

== Track listing ==
All lyrics are written by Masato Odake and Miho Nakayama; all music is composed by Toshinobu Kubota.

8cm CD single
No.	Title	Arrangement	Length
1.	"Cheers for You"	Camus Celli; Andres Levin	4:47
2.	"Cheers for You" (Dance Mix)	Celli; Levin; "Bonzai" Jim Caruso (Remix)	3:56
3.	"Cheers for You" (Original Karaoke)		4:46

== Charts ==
Chart (1995)	Peak position
Oricon Weekly Singles Chart	9

== Certification ==
Region	Certification	Certified units/sales
Japan (RIAJ)	Gold	200,000^{^}
^{^} Shipments figures based on certification alone.
