= Miho's Select =

Compilation album by Miho Nakayama
- Released: December 24, 1991
- Recorded: 1991
- Genre: J-pop; kayōkyoku; dance-pop; city pop
- Length: 53:07
- Language: Japanese
- Label: King Records
- Producer: Miho Nakayama; Akira Fukuzumi

Miho Nakayama chronology
Dance Box (1991)	Miho's Select (1991)	Mellow (1992)

Singles from Miho's Select
- 1. "Rosa" Released: July 16, 1991; 2. "Tōi Machi no Doko ka de..." Released: November 1, 1991

Miho's Select (ミホズ・セレクト, Mihozu Serekuto) is the fourth compilation album by Japanese entertainer Miho Nakayama. Released through King Records on December 24, 1991, the album features re-recordings of Nakayama's personal selection of eight of her past songs, plus the singles "Rosa" and "Tōi Machi no Doko ka de..." The photos in the album were taken from the Wani Books photo book Scena: Miho Nakayama Pictorial.

The album peaked at No. 3 on Oricon's albums chart. It sold over 332,000 copies and was certified Platinum by the RIAJ.

== Track listing ==
No.	Title	Lyrics	Music	Arrangement	Length
1.	"Rosa"	Issaque	Yoshimasa Inoue	ATOM	5:13
2.	"'91 You're My Only Shinin' Star"	Toshiki Kadomatsu	Kadomatsu	Hiroshi Narumi	5:49
3.	"Switch On"	Takashi Matsumoto	Kyōhei Tsutsumi	Takayuki Negishi	4:20
4.	"I Know"	Rui Serizawa	Cindy	Takao Sugiyama	5:25
5.	"Tōi Machi no Doko ka de..." ((遠い街のどこかで…; "Somewhere in a Distant City..."))	Mika Watanabe	Hideya Nakazaki	Nakazaki	5:57
6.	"Kabin" ((花瓶; "Vase"))	Kadomatsu	Kadomatsu	Kadomatsu	5:58
7.	"Cockatoo"	Miho Nakayama	Masaya Ozeki	ATOM	4:13
8.	"Dare ka ga Ai ni..." ((誰かが愛に…; "Someone Loves..."))	Nakayama	Ozeki	ATOM	5:42
9.	"Long Distance to the Heaven"	Mizuho Kitayama	Kitayama	Sugiyama	5:19
10.	"Honki Demo..." ((本気でも…; "Seriously..."))	Ryō Asuka	Asuka	Tomoji Sogawa	5:11
Total length:					53:07

== Charts ==
Chart (1991)	Peak position
Japanese Albums (Oricon)	3

== Certification ==
Region	Certification	Certified units/sales
Japan (RIAJ)	Platinum	400,000^{^}
^{^} Shipments figures based on certification alone.
