= Dé eaya =

Studio album by Miho Nakayama
- Released: March 15, 1991
- Recorded: 1990
- Studio: Sedic Studio; Delta Studio; MIT Studio
- Genre: J-pop; R&B; dance-pop
- Length: 54:11
- Language: Japanese
- Label: King Records
- Producer: Akira Fukuzumi

Miho Nakayama chronology
Collection II (1990)	Dé eaya (1991)	Dance Box (1991)

Dé eaya (デ・イーヤ, De īya) is the 13th studio album by Japanese entertainer Miho Nakayama. Released through King Records on March 15, 1991, it is Nakayama's fourth studio release (after One and Only, Mind Game, and Merry Merry) to not feature a single. The album's title is derived from the Japanese word "De iiya" (でいいや; "No"), but stylized to sound Spanish to match the Latin music motif of the album.

The album peaked at No. 2 on Oricon's albums chart and sold over 125,000 copies.

== Track listing ==
All lyrics are written by Miho Nakayama, except where indicated; all music is arranged by ATOM, except where indicated.

No.	Title	Lyrics	Music	Arrangement	Length
1.	"Melody" (Merodī (メロディー))	Taeko Onuki	Yūzō Hayashi; ATOM	Hayashi; ATOM	3:48
2.	"Mana"	Chika Ueda	Yoshimasa Inoue		4:14
3.	"Crazy Moon"	Onuki	Onuki		4:18
4.	"Joker"		Y. Inoue		6:03
5.	"Paradio"		Ueda		4:53
6.	"Gray"		Ueda	Nittoku Inoue; ATOM	6:02
7.	"Bingo"		Y. Inoue	Y. Inoue	6:05
8.	"Flash Back"		Ueda	N. Inoue; ATOM	5:14
9.	"Cockatoo"		Masaya Ozeki		4:11
10.	"Hitorigoto" ((ひとりごと; "Soliloquy"))		Onuki		4:45
11.	"Special Ever Happened"	Chinfa Kan	Hiroshi Narumi	Narumi	4:38
Total length:					54:11

== Personnel ==
- Miho Nakayama – vocals
- Chuei Yoshikawa – guitar (1)
- Yuzō Hayashi – keyboards (1)
- Nittoku Inoue – keyboards (6, 8)
- Hiroshi Narumi – keyboards (11)
- Shuichi "Ponta" Murakami – drums (6)
- Xácara – percussion (2)
- Saito Takeshi Group – strings (1)
- Jake Concepcion – saxophone (8)
- Shin Kazuhara – flugelhorn (4, 6)
- Nobuo Yagi – mouth harp (9)
- Jacky – backing vocals (2, 5)
- Kazumi Miyaura – backing vocals (2, 5)
- Junko Hirotani – backing vocals (8)
- Yuka Satō – backing vocals (9)

== Charts ==
Chart (1991)	Peak position
Japanese Albums (Oricon)	2
