= Hero (Mariah Carey song) =

1993 single by Mariah Carey

Single by Mariah Carey

from the album Music Box
- B-side: "Everything Fades Away"
- Released: October 18, 1993
- Recorded: 1992
- Studio: The Plant Studios (Sausalito, California); Record Plant (Los Angeles, California); Right Track Studios (New York City, New York)
- Genre: Pop
- Length: 4:17
- Label: Columbia
- Composers: Mariah Carey; Walter Afanasieff
- Lyricist: Mariah Carey
- Producers: Mariah Carey; Walter Afanasieff

Mariah Carey singles chronology
"Dreamlover" (1993)	"Hero" (1993)	"Without You" (1994)

Music video
- "Hero" on YouTube

"Hero" is a song by American singer Mariah Carey, released on October 18, 1993, via Columbia Records as the second single from her third studio album, Music Box (1993). The song was written and produced by Carey and Walter Afanasieff. While writing the song, Carey did not connect to its style or sound; subsequently it was offered to Gloria Estefan, who then was intended to sing it for the soundtrack of the film of the same title (1992). However, after being convinced by Sony executive Tommy Mottola to keep it for herself, she changed some of the lyrics to more precisely fit her personality. Lyrically, the song is regarded as one of Carey's most inspirational and personal ballads, with its protagonist declaring that even though people may feel discouraged or down at times, in reality, they are "heroes" if they look inside themselves and see their own inner strength; in time, it will help them "find the way".

The song initially received mixed reviews from contemporary music critics, with praise for Carey's vocal performance and its message, and criticism for its lyrical content; however, critical opinion of the song has improved over time. Aside from its lyrics, "Hero" derived its hook and sound from several musical instruments, including guitar, piano, and organ. The song was a global success, reaching the top five in Canada, France, Ireland, New Zealand and Norway, and the top ten in Australia and the United Kingdom, and becoming Carey's eighth chart topper on the US Billboard Hot 100. Additionally, it was ranked number 5 on the 1994 year-end chart and number 53 on the Decade-End Chart.

Due to fan requests and letters, as well as their connection to its personal meaning and content, the song remains one of Carey's most performed (and is deemed by many to be her signature song). It was originally performed on The Arsenio Hall Show, The Tonight Show with Jay Leno, and Hey Hey It's Saturday during its original chart run. Additionally, Carey has performed "Hero" at several special live telethons, memorials and benefit concerts; in 1996, Mariah sang the song at Capitol Hill's Peace Officers Memorial Day service in Washington, D.C. (with the Clinton family in attendance), as well as Pavarotti and Friends in 1999, Michael Jackson & Friends also in 1999, America: A Tribute to Heroes in 2001, Live 8 in 2005, and the inaugural ball for Barack Obama in 2009. Additionally, the song has been featured on all of Carey's tours, usually serving as the encore or closing number, and making its debut during the album's accompanying set of concerts, the Music Box Tour. The song was included on several of Carey's compilation albums, #1's (1998), Greatest Hits (2001), The Ballads (2008), and #1 to Infinity (2015).

Throughout the course of her career, Carey has re-recorded the song twice, and filmed other music videos, aside from the original. The first music video for the song was filmed by Larry Jordan in July 1993, during a private concert at Proctor's Theatre, later released on the home video Here Is Mariah Carey. In 2001, following the September 11 attacks, Carey re-recorded the song as a mash-up single titled "Never Too Far/Hero Medley", a medley with her single at the time, "Never Too Far". Additionally, prior to the release of her compilation album The Ballads, Carey re-recorded "Hero" and filmed a new video featuring behind the scenes footage of the studio. "Hero" won two ASCAP Rhythm & Soul Music Awards, one ASCAP Pop Music Award and one BMI Pop Award for the Songwriter Award. The song has been covered many times during both studio and live recordings, such as on global singing competitions.

== Background ==
Mariah Carey's second studio album, Emotions (1991), contained influences from mostly 1950s, 1960s and 1970s balladry and gospel, as well as her continued work of R&B and soul. The album, while praised by some as more mature and raw, failed to reach the critical or commercial heights of her debut effort, and could not introduce Carey to a different market. Following these events, Columbia decided to market the singer in a similar fashion to her debut, only have her produce a more commercial and radio-friendly album. Their plans were to tone down Carey's vocals, and soften the album's production, leaving a more contemporary pop record. Agreeing to the change, Carey and producer Walter Afanasieff began writing and recording material for her third studio effort, Music Box (1993).

== Writing and recording ==
Aside from her work as a vocalist and record artist, Carey was becoming known as a songwriter, having penned and co-produced all of her own material throughout her career. During the production of Music Box, she was approached by Epic Records to write and record a song alongside Afanasieff, and release it on the soundtrack to the 1992 film Hero, featuring Dustin Hoffman and Geena Davis. While Carey was interested in the project, Mottola was very adamant over not allowing Carey to take part in anything involving film, fearing it would hurt her career. Additionally, Columbia felt uneasy about allowing their highest-selling recording artist to contribute to another label, even a branch of the same parent company, Sony. Instead, it was agreed upon that Carey would write a song for the soundtrack that would instead be recorded by another artist. Still interested in working for the film, Carey agreed to pen the feature song for the film, intended for fellow female singer Gloria Estefan. Carey and Afanasieff sat together in a studio in New York, and over the course of two hours, composed the song's melody, lyric and concept. In an interview with Fred Bronson, Afanasieff discussed the process in which they had completed the rough version of the song:

I went to New York and we were in the studio and came to a break. I was sitting at the piano and told Mariah about this movie. Within two hours, we had this incredible seed for this song, 'Hero'. It was never meant for Mariah to sing. In her mind, we were writing a song for Gloria Estefan for this movie. And we went into an area that Mariah didn't really go into-in her words, it was a little bit too schmaltzy or too ballady or too old-fashioned as far as melody and lyrics.

As they completed the song's demo, Tommy Mottola, CEO of Sony Music Entertainment and Carey's fiancé, walked into the studio. After hearing the rough version of the song, on which they were still working, he became interested in it, asking what project the song belonged to. Carey explained to him the concept and how the song would be used for the film Hero. Mottola immediately took an intense liking to the song, responding, "Are you kidding me? You can't give this song to this movie. This is too good. Mariah, you have to take this song. You have to do it." Initially, Carey was guided by the subject of the film, but Afanasieff acknowledged that she made it a very personal song after deciding to keep it, altering some of the lyrics, key and instrumentation. After their decision to keep "Hero", Afanasieff went back to the staff at Epic and told them that they had failed to come up with a song for the soundtrack. Estefan never heard the tune was originally meant for her, and the song that ended up in the soundtrack was "Heart of a Hero", written, produced and recorded by Luther Vandross. In the following weeks, after completing the song, Afanasieff spoke with Bronson about its recording, and how Carey created several versions of the track:

There was a simpler performance on tape and a more difficult one, with Mariah singing out more, with more licks. But we chose a happy medium. The song really calls for not anything really fancy. But she's always fighting the forces inside of her because she's her own devil's advocate. She wants to do something that's so over the top and use her talents and the voice she has. But she also knows she has to restrain herself and do what the music really calls for.

== Composition and lyrical content ==
"Hero"
A 25-second sample of "Hero", featuring the song's second chorus, as well as its instrumentation and inspirational lyrics.

"Hero" is a mid-tempo ballad. It was written and produced by Carey and Afanasieff, and was released as the second single from her third studio album, Music Box. It incorporates music from several musical instruments, including the piano, guitar and organ. The song is set in common time with a tempo of 60 beats per minute. Carey's vocal range spans one octave and eight semitones from the low note of G♯_{3} to the high note of E_{5}. Originally, Carey felt the song was "too schmaltzy" and over the top for her, and not in line with her other work. However, after being convinced by Mottola to keep the song, Carey changed the song and personalized it, during which time she grew to feel a connection to the song and its lyrics. According to author Chris Nickson, "Hero" is one of Carey's most personal and inspirational ballads. Carey has described how the song was never her favorite, however, after all the fan letters and messages she received about the song, she felt the need to perform it as often as possible. In an interview with Fred Bronson, Carey described the song's meaning to her and to fans:

One person could say that 'Hero' is a schmaltzy piece of garbage, but another person can write to me a letter and say, 'I've considered committing suicide every day of my life for the last ten years until I heard that song, and I realized, after all, I can be my own hero,' and that, that's an unexplainable feeling, like I've done something with my life, you know? It meant something to someone.

The song's lyrics describe of the individual power that lies inside every person, their ability to be their own hero. According to author Carol K. Ingall, the song inspires anyone to be a hero. Ingall continued how due to a hero's power to transform and inspire those around them, so too every person has inside of them the light and force needed to help change the world. Similarly, author Darlene Wade connects the song's lyrical content to the power within the soul, however also with the inclusion of God.

According to Maryellen Moffitt, author of "See It, Be It, Write It", "Hero" is about looking into oneself and discovering the inner courage inside each individual, and being strong and believing in oneself through times of trouble and adversity. Moffitt claims the song personally helped him get through difficult moments when "the answers seemed so far away". Following her taped performance of "One Sweet Day" at the Honda Center in Anaheim, California during The Adventures of Mimi Tour, Carey described the song's importance to her and her fans:

I wrote a song a while back even before "One Sweet Day" and it was not my favorite song in the world, but I wrote it. Someone asked me to write a song and they told me the story, and you know it was kind of a moving concept or whatever. And I did it, and I was like you know it's not necessarily what I like per se, but after doing the song over and over again and having people coming up to and saying, thank you for writing 'Hero' because it saved my life or it saved my father's life or my brothers or sisters life, or something of that nature, I said I always have to sing that song when I'm performing because if I don't, you never know who I'm leaving out and you know what, in times of my life I've had to turn to that song lyrically and flip it onto my own life and sing it to myself. So its from the 'Music Box' album, and it’s called 'Hero', this is for you.

== Copyright lawsuits ==
"Hero" was the subject of two copyright plagiarism cases; one by Christopher Selletti and the other by Rhonda Dimmie, filed in 1993 and 1996. Selletti claimed he had written the song's lyrics in the form of a poem. One day, as he drove Sly Stone in a limousine to Long Island, he claimed to show him the poem. Selletti claimed Stone complimented the poem, taking it and promising to patent it and earn him royalties. After many months, the pair fell out of contact, leading Selletti to mail himself the envelope and poem, performing a "poor man's copyright". Three years later in 1996, he claimed to listen to Carey's album Music Box and was shocked when he noted the song's similar lyrics. He filed a lawsuit against Carey, Stone, Sony and Stone's manager Jerry Goldstein. Selletti claimed that Stone must have sold or contributed the lyrics to Carey during the recording of the album in late 1992. However, since Stone did not receive songwriting credits on "Hero", Selletti then dropped the suit against Stone, leaving him against Carey and Sony. Prior to their courtroom meeting, Carey told New York Daily News "I feel totally victimized. 'Hero' is my creation and it holds a very special meaning to me. I have every intention of fighting this all the way." In court, Carey provided evidence to her innocence, in the form of a dated lyrical and music notebook, with conceptual info on the song dated back to November 20, 1992, prior to Selletti's meeting with Stone. Additionally, Carey stated the fact that she had originally written it for the film Hero alongside Afanasieff, making their connection or the involvement of his material impossible. Judge Denny Chin found Carey innocent, and ordered Selletti to pay her a fine.

Years later, after consulting with another lawyer, Selletti made another attempt at suing Carey and Sony. His lawyer, Jeffrey Levitt, had uncovered the fact that the film was released in October 1992, a full six weeks prior to the November 22 dating in Carey's notebook. Additionally, "Heart of a Hero", which was written by Luther Vandross for the film, was submitted in January 1992, making it impossible for "Hero" to have been the original choice of song for the soundtrack. After uncovering further tapes from the studio dating to the summer of 1992, recordings provided evidence that Carey and Afansieff had indeed discussed and had parts of the song completed well before the film's October release. Following the evidence from both parties, the judge dismissed the case, ruling in Carey's favor for the second time. Following the dismissal of the case, Rhonda Dimmie, another songwriter and an independent singer, filed a lawsuit against Carey, this time claiming the song to have borrowed heavily from her song "Be Your Own Hero". During the short deposition made by Carey, Afanasieff revealed that they had written the song in two days during the summer of 1992, "within a matter of hours". Soon after, the case was dismissed, with the judge claiming there to not be sufficient evidence on Dimmie's behalf. Following the lawsuits, in 2001 Selletti made further hints to plan another lawsuit, as well as a forensic team of specialists to conduct research on the incident. Following the suits, Cindy Berger, Carey's publicist released the following statement: "This case has been thrown out of court three times. The federal judge after hearing Selletti's story and considering all the evidence ruled the case was a 'complete fabrication' and that it was filed 'to extort a settlement from deep-pocket defendants."

== Reception ==
=== Critical response ===
Professional ratings
Review scores
Source	Rating
Entertainment Weekly	B+
Stereogum	2/10

The Baltimore Sun critic J.D. Considine praised the song, writing, "["Hero"] is a lavish, soul-stirring ballad, the sort of thing other singers would pay Diane Warren to write." Additionally, he called its chorus "uplifting" and "soaring", following praise towards Carey's vocal performance. Larry Flick from Billboard described it as "an inspirational winner with a sure, dignified message whose wisdom is matched by the stirring clarity of the arrangement." He added, "Carey's vocals have never been more pure-toned and plaintive. An across-the-spectrum smash, it will be heard for years to come because it deserves to be." Troy J. Augusto from Cashbox named it Pick of the Week, calling it a "lushly arranged song of inner strength and the finding of one's self-worth." He felt it "plays like a companion to Bette Midler's "Wind Beneath My Wings", complete with soaring chorus, delicate vocal phrasing and a message so powerful and timeless that it's bound to be turned into a charity fundraising theme song, prom dance theme song, sandwich chain ad campaign or, probably, all of the above." Rik Ambelle from Crawley News stated that Carey "really is at her best" on ballads like "Hero". Entertainment Weekly wrote that "there's a timelessness" to the song "that's almost jarring — it's such a classic chest-pounder that it's as if we've always had 'Hero', and the imaginary movie scene to go with it." Annette M. Lai from the Gavin Report commented that the song is "less commercial", "in that its hook is rather subtle, but still worthy of mention because of its inspiring message about believing in oneself and one's dreams." Another editor, Ron Fell, called it "a wonderful song of self-assuring courage". In his weekly UK chart commentary, James Masterton wrote, "The first ever Mariah Carey single that I will hold my hand up and admit to loving, "Hero" eases back on the vocal histrionics and ups the emotion to produce this tender ballad which crashes straight in to beat the peak of the last single and becomes her highest new entry ever." In a retrospective review, Pop Rescue noted that Carey's vocals "are flawless, and the song flows perfectly along with her." Nathan Brackett from Rolling Stone called the singer's vocal tone "golden" and regarded "Hero" as "a standard for weddings, funerals and singing auditions."

It received a mixed review from The Washington Post editor Mike Joyce, who while impressed, claimed it was not as good as competing ballads of the time. Paul Gettelmen of the Orlando Sentinel criticized the song, calling it a "rip-off" of Whitney Houston's "Greatest Love of All". Stephen Holden, another editor from Rolling Stone also noted an inspiration and similarity to "Greatest Love of All" and calling its lyrics "made up entirely of pop and soul clichés".

=== Chart performance ===
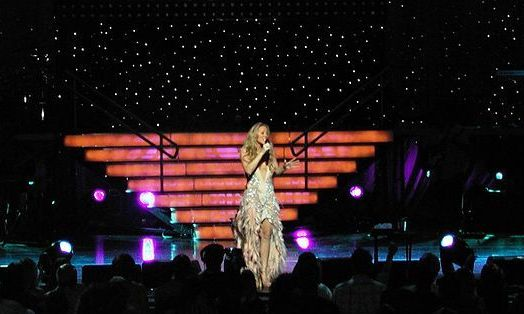
Carey performing "Hero" live during her Charmbracelet World Tour (2003–2004)

"Hero" became Carey's eighth chart topper on the US Billboard Hot 100. It reached the number one position in its tenth week and spent four weeks at the top, from December 25, 1993, to January 15, 1994. It replaced "Again" by Janet Jackson, and was replaced by Bryan Adams, Rod Stewart and Sting's "All for Love". In total, the song remained in the top 40 for 25 weeks, with 16 of those spent in the top ten. On the Billboard year-end Charts for 1994, "Hero" finished at number five, number 53 on the decade-end chart and number three on the year-end Airplay Chart. "Hero" has been certified triple-platinum by the Recording Industry Association of America (RIAA), denoting shipments of over three million units throughout the country. Prior to the song's recital at Carey's concert at Madison Square Garden on December 10, 1993, during her Music Box Tour, she announced that the proceeds from the stateside sales of the single were to be donated to the families of the victims of the 1993 Long Island Rail Road shooting. The song was dedicated to the three men who subdued the shooter on stage that night, three days after the tragedy. Carey was a frequent rider on the LIRR rush hour service out of Penn Station when she lived on Long Island. In Canada, the song debuted at number 64 on the Canadian RPM Singles Chart during the week of November 6, 1993. During the week of December 4, 1993, "Hero" reached its peak position of number three, staying there for three consecutive weeks, and a total of 21 weeks within the top 100. "Hero" finished at numbers 48 and 22 on the Canadian year-end charts for 1993 and 1994.

The song entered the Australian Singles Chart at number 47 on the issue dated November 14, 1993, and eventually spent three weeks at its peak position of number seven. "Hero" was certified platinum by the Australian Recording Industry Association (ARIA), denoting shipments of over 70,000 units throughout the country. In France, "Hero" entered the single chart at number 24 during the week dated March 19, 1994. After staying six consecutive weeks at its peak position of number five, and a total of 21 weeks in the chart, the song was certified silver by the Syndicat National de l'Édition Phonographique (SNEP), denoting shipments of over 200,000 units. In the Netherlands, the song peaked at number 13 on the Single Top 100 chart, spending eight weeks fluctuating within the chart. "Hero" peaked at number five on the Irish Singles Chart, spending a combined 14 weeks within the chart. In New Zealand, the song peaked at number two on the singles chart, spending five nonconsecutive weeks at the position, and a total of 20 weeks on the chart. "Hero" was certified Platinum by the Recording Industry Association of New Zealand (RIANZ), denoting shipments of 15,000 units. During the week of January 21, 1994, the song peaked at number two on the Norwegian Singles Chart, spending a total of eight weeks in the chart and being certified gold by the VG-lista. On November 11, 1993, the song entered the UK Singles Chart at number eight. The following week, it reached its peak position of number seven, spending a total of 15 weeks in the chart during its original chart run. On November 8, 2008, following the release of the "Hero" by the X Factor finalists, it re-entered the chart at number 100. Two weeks later, "Hero" managed to reach number 67 on the chart, before plummeting outside the top 100 the following week. As of December 2022, the British Phonographic Industry (BPI) estimates sales of "Hero" in the United Kingdom to be at 400,000 units, qualifying it for a gold certification in the UK.

=== Awards and accolades ===
"Hero" was awarded and nominated for awards throughout the music industry. At the 12th ASCAP Awards, Carey took home the award for "Rhythm & Soul Songwriter". The following year, at the 13th annual ceremony, "Hero" won Carey awards for "Rhythm & Soul Songwriter" and "Pop Songwriter". The song was awarded a BMI Pop Award at the ceremony in 1995. Additionally, it was nominated for Best Female Pop Vocal Performance at the 37th annual Grammy Awards, losing to Sheryl Crow's "All I Wanna Do".

== Music videos and re-recordings ==
Prior to the song's release towards the end of 1993, Carey performed an intimate concert at Proctor's Theatre, New York, on July 15, 1993. Following its taping, the concert was released to home video, titled Here Is Mariah Carey (1993). Carey's performance of the song that night was edited and commissioned as the official music video, directed by Larry Jordan. The video was included on Carey's DVD #1's (1998). The video features her in a long dark dress, sporting long curly hair. On few international versions of the album, a Spanish version of the song was included, such as on the Mexican and Argentinian versions. It was titled "Héroe", and featured translation by Jorge Luis Piloto, a Spanish musician who had come to briefly work with Carey.

In 2001, following the September 11 attacks, Carey re-recorded the song as a medley with "Never Too Far", her single at the time. Titled "Never Too Far/Hero Medley", it was released as a charity single throughout October of that year. In an interview with MTV, Carey described the idea behind the medley:

"I started [performing] at different charity events where I did a combination of 'Never Too Far' and 'Hero'. We made it into a medley and kinda put them both in the same key and just made it work, and people responded really well to it. It's been interesting for me, since the events of September 11, the way people have been playing 'Hero' and talking to me about 'Never Too Far', 'cause that song is also about loss. I figured that it would be a nice thing to do, to put them both out for Christmas. ... I feel like it's our responsibility to do what we can right now in terms of music, just being artists and being human beings."

In 2008, prior to the release of Carey's compilation album The Ballads, Carey recorded a version of "Hero" with new vocals, releasing it on the stateside version of the album. Additionally, a music video was filmed and released for the 2008 version, featuring behind the scenes footage of the song's recording, as well as Carey's writing music in the studio. The song was eventually featured on the 30th anniversary edition of Music Box released in September 2023, sub-titled the "2009 Version". In 2024, a remastered live version of the song is included on the 30th anniversary edition of Merry Christmas which was her performance at the Cathedral of St. John The Divine.

== Live performances ==
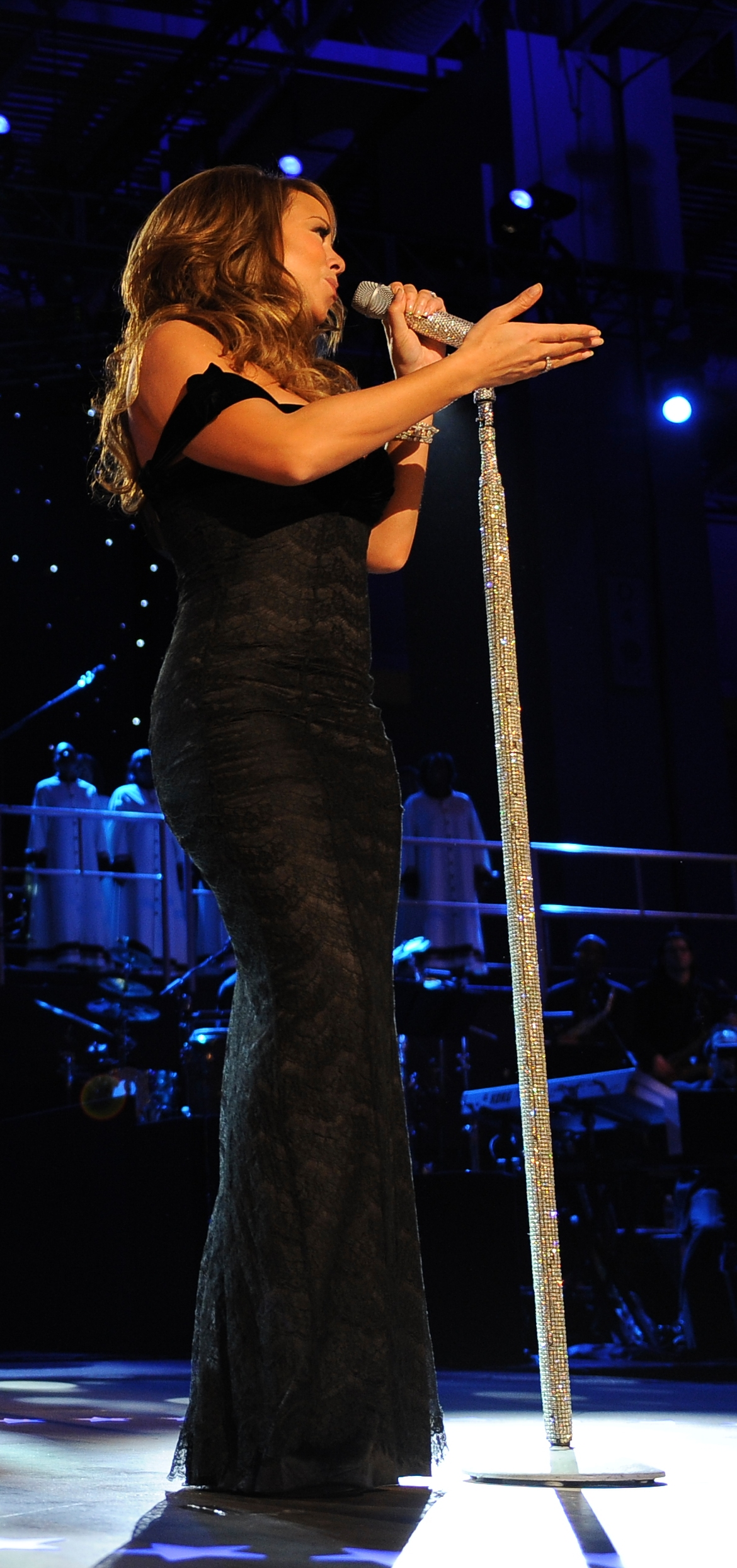
Carey performing "Hero" live during The Neighborhood Inaugural Ball for President Obama in Washington, D.C.

Due to fan requests and its personal lyrical content, Carey has performed "Hero" on several occasions throughout her career. She first performed the song in July 1993 at the Proctor's Theater, later to be released as Here Is Mariah Carey. Later, she performed the song live on The Arsenio Hall Show in November 1993, appearing on stage after a short interview wearing a mid-length black gown and sporting long brown locks. She was joined by three back-up vocalists, Trey Lorenz, Cindi Mizelle and Melodie Daniels. Carey continued stateside promotion of the song with a performance on The Jay Leno Show the following week. Throughout Europe and Australasia, Carey made appearances on Sacrée Soirée in France, Platendaagse in the Netherlands, Sale El Dia in Spain, Sontagsoppet in Sweden, and Hey Hey It's Saturday in Australia. On May 15, 1996, at the Annual National Peace Officers Memorial Service, held in the grounds of the US Capitol Building, Carey performed Hero in tribute to police officers killed in the line of duty. In attendance was the US president at the time, Bill Clinton. Following the release of her sixth studio album Butterfly, Carey performed it alongside "Butterfly" on The Oprah Winfrey Show on September 22, 1997. In between both performances, Winfrey interviewed Carey over her failed marriage to Mottola, as well as the several negative rumors that followed their divorce. Two years later, she performed "Hero" together with Luciano Pavarotti in Modena, Italy during the summer of 1999. Carey appeared on stage alongside him, wearing a long pink evening gown and sporting a long straightened hairstyle. The performance was filmed and released on VHS as Pavarotti and Friends.

Carey sang "Hero" in Seoul, South Korea in June 1999 during the Michael Jackson & Friends benefit concert, which raised money for several charitable organizations. On September 21, 2001, following the September 11 attacks, Carey sang "Hero" as part of the America: A Tribute to Heroes telethon. Her appearance on the telethon was her first public appearance since her publicized breakdown and hospitalization, prior to the release of Glitter which was theatrical release on the same day. In 2003, Carey performed a medley of songs from her album, Charmbracelet (2002), during Michael Jordan's final NBA All-Star Game in 2003 Following the medley, she included "Hero" onto the short set-list, followed by Jordan's final game. On July 2, 2005, a benefit concert was held in Hyde Park, London titled Live 8. The televised event was watched by over 9.6 million British citizens, and held a live audience of over 200,000. Carey performed a three-song set-list, opening with "Make It Happen" and "Hero", which featured a live choir of African children, and followed by "We Belong Together", accompanied by actors Chris Barrie, Judy Flynn, Mike Burns and Julia St. John. During a promotional tour for her eleventh studio effort E=MC2 in 2008, the song was re-recorded by the 2008 UK X Factor finalists and released as a single. Prior to its release, Carey appeared on the program, where she performed her single at the time "I Stay in Love", followed by a duet of "Hero" in between her and the finalists. In 2009, during the inaugural ball for Barack Obama, Carey opened the televised event with a live rendition of "Hero", wearing a long black evening gown while sporting a long wavy hairstyle. On June 5, 2010, Carey performed the song alongside "We Belong Together" at the Walmart shareholders meeting. Following the performance, Carey gained heavy media coverage for her apparent weight gain, leading many to suspect her pregnancy with husband Nick Cannon.

Aside from the several live televised performances, Carey included "Hero" on the set-lists on all of her tours, usually serving as one of the closing numbers. In an interview, Carey said that although it is not one of her favorite songs, she tries to perform it on each of her shows due to its powerful message, fearing that if she doesn't, she might miss out on the opportunity to help someone. She first performed the song in concert during her stateside Music Box Tour. During the song's recital, Carey donned a black gown and matching sandals, while sporting her signature golden locks of the time. During her performances at the Tokyo Dome on her Daydream World Tour (1996), Carey performed the song as one of the closing numbers. Prior to the song, Carey introduced Afanasieff, who played the organ throughout the tour. Carey appeared on stage with a straightened hairstyle, and a long black evening gown. On her Butterfly World Tour in 1998, Carey performed "Hero" as the eighth song on the set-list. Unlike her previous tour, Afanasieff was not present, due to the pair's continued personal dispute. During the song, Carey was backed up by three vocalists, and wore a long sequined black gown. In 2000, during her Rainbow World Tour, Carey used "Hero" as the tour's closing number, leaving the stage to meet and greet fans during the song's performance. Similarly, "Hero" served as the closing number on her Charmbracelet World Tour (2002–03), where she wore a long beige gown and feathered frock tail. In 2006, during The Adventures of Mimi Tour, Carey performed "Hero" as the penultimate song on the set-list. She wore a blue floor-length mid-bearing gown, and received vocal back up from four background singers. Following the release of her twelfth studio effort, Carey embarked on the Angels Advocate Tour. After performing the regular set-list, Carey exited the arena, only to make one re-entry for "Hero" as the encore performance. She also performed the song regularly as a part of her 2014 The Elusive Chanteuse Show world tour, and her first annual Christmas show at New York City's Beacon Theatre, entitled All I Want For Christmas Is You, A Night of Joy & Festivity. In addition, she included the song in her 2015 Las Vegas residency, Mariah Carey Number 1's, a chronicle of her 18 US number 1 hits. The song was performed 8th in her setlist. She sang on a circular platform on the stage, donning a short white dress.

== Track listings ==
- US 7-inch and Japanese CD single
1. "Hero" – 4:18
2. "Everything Fades Away" – 5:25
- European CD single
1. "Hero" (LP version) – 4:18
2. "Hero" (Live from Here Is Mariah Carey) – 4:16
- European CD maxi single
1. "Hero" (LP Version) – 4:19
2. "Dreamlover" (Def Club Mix Edit) – 4:02
3. "Dreamlover" (Theo's Club Joint) – 4:32
4. "Dreamlover" (Def Tribal Mix) – 6:40
- US/Japan CD maxi single
1. "Hero" (LP Version) – 4:18
2. "Hero" (Live from Here Is Mariah Carey) – 4:16
3. "Everything Fades Away" – 5:25
4. "Dreamlover" (Club Joint Mix) – 4:33
- 2023 7-inch vinyl
1. "Hero"
2. "Héroe" (Spanish version of "Hero")

== Credits and personnel ==
Credits adapted from the Music Box liner notes.

"Hero" was recorded at The Plant Studios, Sausalito, California, and The Record Plant, Los Angeles. Vocals were recorded and mixed at Right Track Studios, New York. Recording engineer, Dana Jon Chappelle.

- Mariah Carey – Lyricist, co-production, songwriting, vocals
- Walter Afanasieff – co-production, songwriting, keyboards, rhythm programming, acoustic guitar
- Michael Landau – guitar
- Dana Jon Chappelle – music and vocal engineering
- David Gleeson –additional engineering
- Mick Guzauski – mixing
- Bob Ludwig – mastering

== Charts ==
=== Weekly charts ===
Chart (1993–1995)	Peak position
Australia (ARIA)	7
Belgium (Ultratop 50 Flanders)	45
Canada Retail Singles (The Record)	10
Canada Contemporary Hit Radio (The Record)	5
Canada Pop Adult (The Record)	1
Canada Top Singles (RPM)	3
Canada Adult Contemporary (RPM)	1
Europe (Eurochart Hot 100)	19
Europe (European AC Top 25)	7
France (SNEP)	5
Germany (GfK)	41
Iceland (Íslenski Listinn Topp 40)	23
Ireland (IRMA)	5
Israel (Israeli Singles Chart)	7
Japan Albums (Oricon) CD maxi single	42
Netherlands (Dutch Top 40)	10
Netherlands (Single Top 100)	13
New Zealand (Recorded Music NZ)	2
Norway (VG-lista)	2
Sweden (Sverigetopplistan)	27
UK Singles (Official Charts)	7
UK Airplay (Music Week)	11
US Hot 100 Singles (Billboard)	1
US Hot Adult Contemporary (Billboard)	2
US Hot Dance Breakouts Maxi-Singles Sales (Billboard)	5
US Hot Latin Tracks (Billboard) Spanish version: "Héroe"	40
US Hot R&B Singles (Billboard)	5
US Latin Pop Airplay (Billboard) Spanish version: "Héroe"	15
US Top 40/Mainstream (Billboard)	1
US Top 40/Rhythm-Crossover (Billboard)	2
US Cash Box Top 100	2
US Top 100 R&B Singles (Cash Box)	7
US Adult Contemporary (Gavin Report)	1
US Top 40 (Gavin Report)	1
US Urban (Gavin Report)	3
US Adult Contemporary (Radio & Records)	2
US Contemporary Hit Radio (Radio & Records)	1
US Urban Contemporary (Radio & Records)	1

Chart (2008–2014)	Peak position
France (SNEP)	186
UK Singles (OCC)	67

=== Year-end charts ===
Chart (1993)	Position
Canada Top Singles (RPM)	63
Canada Adult Contemporary (RPM)	97
Netherlands (Dutch Top 40)	118
UK Singles (OCC)	58
US Adult Contemporary (Radio & Records)	61
US Contemporary Hit Radio (Radio & Records)	79

Chart (1994)	Position
Australia (ARIA)	59
Brazil (Brazilian Radio Airplay)	6
Canada Retail Singles (The Record)	31
Canada Top Singles (RPM)	22
Canada Adult Contemporary (RPM)	17
Europe (Eurochart Hot 100)	56
France (SNEP)	19
Germany (Media Control)	91
New Zealand (RIANZ)	41
US Billboard Hot 100	5
US Adult Contemporary (Billboard)	7
US Hot R&B/Hip-Hop Songs (Billboard)	44
US Cash Box Top 100	19
US Adult Contemporary (Radio & Records)	30
US Contemporary Hit Radio (Radio & Records)	39
US Urban (Radio & Records)	77

=== Decade-end charts ===
Chart (1990–1999)	Position
France (SNEP)	185
US Billboard Hot 100	53

== Certifications ==
Certifications for "Hero"
Region	Certification	Certified units/sales
Australia (ARIA)	2× Platinum	140,000^{‡}
Canada (Music Canada)	Platinum	80,000^{‡}
Denmark (IFPI Danmark)	Gold	45,000^{‡}
France (SNEP)	Gold	250,000^{*}
New Zealand (RMNZ)	Platinum	30,000^{‡}
Norway (IFPI Norway)	Gold	
United Kingdom (BPI)	Gold	400,000^{‡}
United States (RIAA)	3× Platinum	3,000,000^{‡}
^{*} Sales figures based on certification alone.^{‡} Sales+streaming figures based on certification alone.

== Release history ==
Release dates and formats for "Hero"
Region	Date	Format(s)	Label	Ref.
United Kingdom	October 18, 1993	12-inch vinyl; cassette; CD	Columbia	
United States	October 19, 1993	7-inch vinyl; cassette; maxi CD	Columbia	
Canada	October 25, 1993	Maxi CD	Columbia	
Australia	November 1, 1993	CD; cassette	Columbia	
Japan	November 18, 1993	Mini CD	Sony Music Japan	
Japan	January 1, 1994	Maxi CD	Sony Music Japan	
Various	November 17, 2023	7-inch vinyl (Urban Outfitters exclusive)	Sony Music	

== Miho Nakayama version ==
"Hero"

Single by Miho Nakayama

from the album Collection III
- Language: Japanese
- B-side: "Hero (a Cappella Version)"
- Released: December 14, 1994
- Recorded: 1994
- Genre: J-pop
- Length: 4:54
- Label: King Records
- Composers: Mariah Carey; Walter Afanasieff
- Lyricists: Mariah Carey; Miho Nakayama

Miho Nakayama singles chronology
"Sea Paradise (OL no Hanran)" (1994)	"Hero" (1994)	"Cheers for You" (1995)

"Hero" was covered by Japanese entertainer Miho Nakayama as her 30th single, released by King Records on December 14, 1994. Co-written in Japanese by Nakayama and arranged by Robbie Buchanan, this version was used as the theme song of the Fuji TV drama series For You, which also starred Nakayama. The B-side is an a cappella version with different lyrics.

Nakayama's version of "Hero" peaked at No. 8 on Oricon's weekly singles chart. It sold over 474,000 copies and was certified Platinum by the RIAJ.

=== Track listing ===
All lyrics are written by Mariah Carey and Miho Nakayama; all music is composed by Mariah Carey and Walter Afanasieff.

8 cm CD single
No.	Title	Arrangement	Length
1.	"Hero"	Robbie Buchanan	4:54
2.	"Hero" (a Cappella version)	Cindy; Hiroshi Narumi	4:16
3.	"Hero" (Original Karaoke)		4:54
4.	"Hero (a Cappella Version)" (Original Karaoke)		4:14

=== Charts ===
Weekly charts

Chart (1994)	Peak position
Oricon Weekly Singles Chart	8

Year-end charts

Chart (1995)	Peak position
Oricon Year-End Chart	77

=== Certification ===
Region	Certification	Certified units/sales
Japan (RIAJ)	Platinum	400,000^{^}
^{^} Shipments figures based on certification alone.

== The X Factor UK 2008 contestants version ==
"Hero"

Single by The X Factor contestants 2008
- Released: October 27, 2008
- Genre: Pop
- Length: 4:21
- Label: Syco
- Songwriter: Mariah Carey • Walter Afanasieff
- Producer: Quiz & Larossi

The X Factor contestants singles chronology
"Hero" (2008)	"You Are Not Alone" (2009)

The twelve contestants from the fifth series of the British TV talent show The X Factor released a cover of the song on October 27, 2008, for the Help for Heroes and The Royal British Legion charities. The contestants performed the single for the first time on October 25, 2008, during Week 3 of the live broadcasts. The single was released on download on October 26, 2008, followed by the physical release the day after.

On October 30, it was announced that the British Chancellor of the Exchequer, Alistair Darling, would waive all tax on copies sold on the single. He said, "I support the efforts being made by the X Factor contestants and in recognition of that I'm proposing effectively to waive the VAT on the sale of these singles. We will do that by making a donation equivalent to the value of the VAT." Following the single's release, the music video was sent to music channels on November 8 before the fifth live show, when the contestants (excluding Diana Vickers, absent because of illness) sang it again. All the contestants appeared in the video, which also showed still images of soldiers in Iraq. The contestants performed the song again with Mariah Carey on November 8, 2008, during Week 5 of the live broadcasts, a week in which Carey's music and career served as the theme.

=== Chart performance ===
On November 2, 2008, the single debuted atop of the UK Singles Chart, staying there for three consecutive weeks and becoming the fastest-selling single of 2008. The song sold 100,000 copies in the first day of its release and 313,244 copies by the end of the week. It raised over £1 million for Help for Heroes.

It was suggested that the song would become one of the biggest-selling releases of the decade, with HMV spokesman Gennaro Castaldo saying: "This is proving to be one of the biggest single releases for years if not the decade. Only Leona Lewis's debut hit "A Moment Like This", which sold over 500,000 copies in its first week, can compare. It's selling more than most Christmas No 1s would, and HMV has placed an urgent order for more copies." On December 28, 2008, the UK Singles Chart listed it as the second biggest selling single for the year end countdown and the nineteenth best-selling single of the decade. The British Phonographic Industry (BPI) certified the song double-platinum, denoting shipments of over 1.2 million copies within the country.

=== Charts and certifications ===
==== Weekly charts ====
Chart (2008)	Peak position
Irish Singles Chart	1
Scottish Singles Chart	1
UK Singles Chart	1

==== Year-end charts ====
Chart (2000–2009)	Peak position
UK Top 100 Songs of the Decade	19

==== Certifications ====
Region	Certification	Certified units/sales
United Kingdom (BPI)	2× Platinum	1,200,000^{^}
^{^} Shipments figures based on certification alone.

== Other cover versions and uses ==
"Hero" has been covered several times through live performances, as well as recorded studio versions. Additionally, since its debut, it has achieved strong media attention. In 2009, prior to the election results, Barack Obama's wife Michelle played him the song to give him strength and inner support. A source close to Carey claimed that hearing the song's use meant a lot to her, saying, "She was blown away when she heard. She is so honoured to have played her part in such an occasion." At the 1994 Essence Awards, Aretha Franklin performed a live rendition of the song as a tribute to The Reverend Jesse Jackson. In 2001, Neal Schon performed an instrumental version on the album Voice. Filipino singers Regine Velasquez and Sarah Geronimo both performed the song live on television, with the former playing a medley of the song alongside Carey's "Anytime You Need a Friend". International male operatic pop group Il Divo included the Spanish version of the song on their second studio album, Ancora (2005). Australian singer and actress Natalie Bassingthwaighte performed a live version of the song at the Rugby League World Cup Heroes 08 Campaign. Michael Ball, British singer, actor and radio personality, covered "Hero" for his album titled One Voice (2006). American Idol season 5 contestant Heather Cox performed the song during the top 20 performances week, only to be voted off that night for not being able to successfully carry the song. Similarly, season 7 contestant Brooke White performed the song during the Mariah Carey themed week, while season 8 contestant Danny Gokey performed the song in the top 36 performances. season 10 contestant Karen Rodriguez performed the song in both English and Spanish versions in the top 24 performances, making it into the top 13 the following night. Japanese-American singer Yuna Ito included her rendition of "Hero" on her compilation album Love -Singles Best 2005–2010. Barbadian R&B singer Rihanna sang "Hero" during a live talent show at her high school in Barbados when she was 15. Soon after, she was signed by Jay-Z to Def Jam. The YouTube event "Dear Class of 2020" had the cast of Schitt's Creek performing the song before Carey appeared for the last lines. The X Factor winner Melanie Amaro performed the song during the first season of the show, as a song chosen for her by the public. In 2013, Dami Im recorded a version for her album Dami Im. The album was #1 in Australia.

== See also ==
- List of Billboard Hot 100 number-one singles of 1993
- List of Billboard Hot 100 number-one singles of 1994
