= Pure White =

Studio album by Miho Nakayama
- Released: June 8, 1994
- Recorded: 1994
- Genre: J-pop; pop rock; R&B
- Length: 58:33
- Language: Japanese
- Label: King Records
- Producer: Miho Nakayama; KNACK; Nobuyoshi Suzuki

Miho Nakayama chronology
Blanket Privacy (1993)	Pure White (1994)	Pure White Live '94 (1994)

Singles from Pure White
- 1. "Sea Paradise (OL no Hanran)" Released: June 8, 1994

Pure White (ピュア・ホワイト, Pyua Howaito) is the 16th studio album by Japanese entertainer Miho Nakayama. Released through King Records on June 8, 1994, it features the single "Sea Paradise (OL no Hanran)". Like her previous studio releases Mellow and Wagamama na Actress, Pure White was self-produced and recorded in Los Angeles.

The album peaked at No. 3 on Oricon's albums chart and sold over 112,000 copies.

== Track listing ==
All lyrics are written by Miho Nakayama, except where indicated; all music is composed by KNACK, except where indicated.

No.	Title	Lyrics	Music	Arrangement	Length
1.	"Sea Paradise (OL no Hanran)" ((Sea Paradise -OLの反乱-; "Sea Paradise -An Office Lady's Rebellion-"))			ATOM	7:27
2.	"Panorama"		Nakayama	ATOM	5:38
3.	"Amiageta Yume" ((あみあげた夢; "I Gave Up the Dream"))	Takashi Hamazaki; Nakayama	Hamazaki; Kazuo Fushishima		4:41
4.	"Anata wo Sora e Todoketai" ((あなたを宇宙（そら）へ届けたい; "I Want to Deliver You to the Stars"))			KNACK	5:26
5.	"Ta-ku-ra-mi" ((タ・ク・ラ・ミ))			KNACK	2:29
6.	"Hoshi no Nusutto" ((星の盗人; "The Thief from the Stars"))	Nakayama; Iza Mizuno		ATOM	6:04
7.	"Blue Stone"		Jeff Pfeifer; Rob Pfeifer	KNACK	5:04
8.	"Itazura ni Mane Shitari..." ((いたずらに まねしたり…; "Imitate It Mischievously..."))	Chara; Nakayama	Chara	Yūsuke Asada	4:41
9.	"Title"	Kōki Okada; Taka Satō; Yūsuke Gotō; (To Be Continued)	To Be Continued	To Be Continued	5:09
10.	"Futtari no Photograph" ((ふったりのphotograph; "Two Photographs"))			KNACK	5:27
11.	"Pure White"			KNACK	6:26
Total length:					58:33

== Personnel ==
- Miho Nakayama – vocals
- Keisuke Araki – keyboards
- Yōichi Yamazaki –keyboards, piano
- Kazushi Ueda – guitar
- Masato Saitō – bass
- Hisanori Kumamaru – drums

== Charts ==
Chart (1994)	Peak position
Japanese Albums (Oricon)	3
