= Thinking About You (Anata no Yoru wo Tsutsumitai) =

1996 single by Miho Nakayama

Single by Miho Nakayama

from the album Deep Lip French
- Language: Japanese
- English title: Thinking About You (I Want to Wrap Your Night)
- B-side: "Angel"
- Released: February 16, 1996
- Recorded: 1995
- Genre: J-pop
- Length: 4:52
- Label: King Records
- Composer: Maria
- Lyricist: Masato Odake

Miho Nakayama singles chronology
"Hurt to Heart (Itami no Yukue)" (1995)	"Thinking About You (Anata no Yoru wo Tsutsumitai)" (1996)	"True Romance" (1996)

"Thinking About You (Anata no Yoru wo Tsutsumitai)" (Thinking about you〜あなたの夜を包みたい〜; lit. "Thinking About You ~I Want to Wrap Your Night~") is the 33rd single by Japanese entertainer Miho Nakayama. Written by Masato Odake and Maria, the single was released on February 16, 1996, by King Records.

== Background and release ==
"Thinking About You (Anata no Yoru wo Tsutsumitai)" was used as the ending theme of NTV's NNN Kyō no Dekigoto (NNNきょうの出来事; NNN Today's Event) at the request of free announcer Yoshiko Sakurai.

"Thinking About You (Anata no Yoru wo Tsutsumitai)" peaked at No. 13 on Oricon's weekly singles chart and sold over 107,000 copies.

== Track listing ==
8cm CD single
No.	Title	Lyrics	Music	Arrangement	Length
1.	"Thinking About You (Anata no Yoru wo Tsutsumitai)" ((Thinking about you〜あなたの夜を包みたい〜; "Thinking About You ~I Want to Wrap Your Night~"))	Masato Odake	Maria	Kazuo Ōtani	4:52
2.	"Angel"	Miho Nakayama; Odake	Maria	Hajime Mizoguchi	4:33
3.	"Thinking About You (Anata no Yoru wo Tsutsumitai)" (Original Karaoke)				4:53
4.	"Angel" (Original Karaoke)				4:33

== Charts ==
Chart (1996)	Peak position
Oricon Weekly Singles Chart	13
