= A Place Under the Sun =

1999 single by Miho Nakayama

Single by Miho Nakayama

from the album Your Selection 1
- Language: Japanese
- B-side: "A Place Under the Sun (Reversion); Noon Moon"
- Released: May 19, 1999
- Recorded: 1999
- Genre: J-pop
- Length: 5:06
- Label: King Records
- Composer: Yoshimasa Inoue
- Lyricist: Miho Nakayama

Miho Nakayama singles chronology
"Love Clover" (1998)	"A Place Under the Sun" (1999)	"Adore" (1999)

"A Place Under the Sun" is the 38th single by Japanese entertainer Miho Nakayama. Written by Nakayama and Yoshimasa Inoue, the single was released on May 19, 1999, by King Records.

== Background and release ==
"A Place Under the Sun" was originally titled "Hi no Ataru Basho" (陽のあたる場所; "A Place in the Sun"), but was retitled when Nakayama's staff pointed out that it had the same title as the song by Misia, which was released a year earlier. The song was used by Rohto Pharmaceutical for their Rohto Cure commercial featuring Nakayama.

"A Place Under the Sun" peaked at No. 40 on Oricon's weekly singles chart and sold over 10,000 copies, becoming the lowest-charting and lowest-selling single in Nakayama's career.

== Track listing ==
All lyrics are written by Miho Nakayama; all music is arranged by Yoshimasa Inoue.

8cm CD single
No.	Title	Music	Length
1.	"A Place Under the Sun"	Inoue	5:06
2.	"A Place Under the Sun" (Reversion)	Inoue	4:53
3.	"Noon Moon"	Mr. Moon; Inoue	3:40
4.	"A Place Under the Sun" (Instrumental)		4:51

== Charts ==
Chart (1999)	Peak position
Oricon Weekly Singles Chart	40
