= Love Clover =

1998 single by Miho Nakayama

Single by Miho Nakayama

from the album Your Selection 1
- Language: Japanese
- B-side: "Empty Pocket"
- Released: April 8, 1998
- Recorded: 1997
- Genre: J-pop; pop rock
- Length: 5:24
- Label: King Records
- Composer: Takuro
- Lyricists: Takuro; Miho Nakayama

Miho Nakayama singles chronology
"March Color" (1997)	"Love Clover" (1998)	"A Place Under the Sun" (1999)

"Love Clover" (ラブ・クローバー, Rabu Kurōbā) is the 37th single by Japanese entertainer Miho Nakayama. Written by Takuro and Nakayama, the single was released on April 8, 1998, by King Records.

== Background and release ==
Production of "Love Clover" began when Glay guitarist Takuro recorded a demo and Nakayama answered a request for a female singer to do the vocals. As Glay was busy producing their fifth album Pure Soul, the vocals and instrumentals were recorded at separate studios, with Nakayama and Takuro communicating through telephone and fax exchanges. Glay lead vocalist Teru has an uncredited role on backing vocals. The song was used as the ending theme of the NTV variety show Merengue no Kimochi (メレンゲの気持ち, Merenge no Kimochi; Merengue Feelings).

"Love Clover" peaked at No. 14 on Oricon's weekly singles chart and sold over 38,000 copies. It was also Nakayama's last single to be certified Gold by the RIAJ.

== Track listing ==
8cm CD single
No.	Title	Lyrics	Music	Arrangement	Length
1.	"Love Clover"	Takuro; Miho Nakayama	Takuro	Takuro	5:24
2.	"Empty Pocket"	Nakayama; Masato Odake	Takuro	Kōichi Korenaga; Hajime Mizoguchi	4:17
3.	"Love Clover" (Original Karaoke)				5:21

== Charts ==
Chart (1998)	Peak position
Oricon Weekly Singles Chart	14

== Certification ==
Region	Certification	Certified units/sales
Japan (RIAJ)	Gold	200,000^{^}
^{^} Shipments figures based on certification alone.
