= True Romance (Miho Nakayama song) =

1996 single by Miho Nakayama

Single by Miho Nakayama

from the album Deep Lip French
- Language: Japanese
- B-side: "Fui no Kiss"
- Released: June 7, 1996
- Recorded: 1996
- Genre: J-pop
- Length: 4:16
- Label: King Records
- Composer: Yoshimasa Inoue
- Lyricist: Masato Odake

Miho Nakayama singles chronology
| "Thinking About You (Anata no Yoru wo Tsutsumitai)" (1996) | "True Romance" (1996) | "Mirai e no Present" (1996) |

"True Romance" (トゥルー・ロマンス, Turū Romansu) is the 34th single by Japanese entertainer Miho Nakayama. Written by Masato Odake and Yoshimasa Inoue, the single was released on June 7, 1996, by King Records.

== Background and release ==
The B-side, "Fui no Kiss", was used by Astel Tokyo for a commercial featuring Nakayama.

"True Romance" peaked at No. 37 on Oricon's weekly singles chart and sold over 38,000 copies, becoming Nakayama's first single to sell less than 100,000 copies.

== Track listing ==
All music is arranged by Hajime Mizoguchi.

8cm CD single
| No. | Title | Lyrics | Music | Length |
|---|---|---|---|---|
| 1. | "True Romance" | Masato Odake | Yoshimasa Inoue | 4:16 |
| 2. | "Fui no Kiss" ((不意のKiss; "Sudden Kiss")) | Maria | Maria | 4:43 |
| 3. | "True Romance" (Original Karaoke) | | | 4:16 |
| 4. | "Angel" (Original Karaoke) | | | 4:43 |

== Charts ==
| Chart (1996) | Peak position |
|---|---|
| Oricon Weekly Singles Chart | 37 |
