= Sapporo Ichiban =

Instant noodle brand

- Product type: Instant noodles (ramen, yakisoba)
- Current owner: Sanyo Foods
- Produced by: Sanyo Foods
- Country: Japan

Sapporo Ichiban (サッポロ一番) is a brand of instant noodles (primarily ramen) manufactured by Sanyo Foods of Maebashi, Gunma, Japan. Sapporo Ichiban noodles are also manufactured in Garden Grove, California, for the United States and Canadian market.

Sapporo Ichiban has also found a market outside Japan, most notably with consumers in Hong Kong, the United States, Mexico, Argentina and Canada.

Sapporo Ichiban literally means "Sapporo's number one [noodle]", coined by future company president Takeshi Ida after he was particularly impressed with Sapporo's local ramen.

== Facilities and manufacturing ==
Sanyo Foods had previously kept their headquarters, and R&D all in their original town of Maebashi city, Gunma prefecture, but their headquarters have legally moved to Minato-ku, Tokyo. They have built their plants for domestic products in Gunma, Chiba, Nara, and Fukuoka. There is a small sales branch in Sapporo. Products sold in the United States are made in Garden Grove, California.

== Products ==
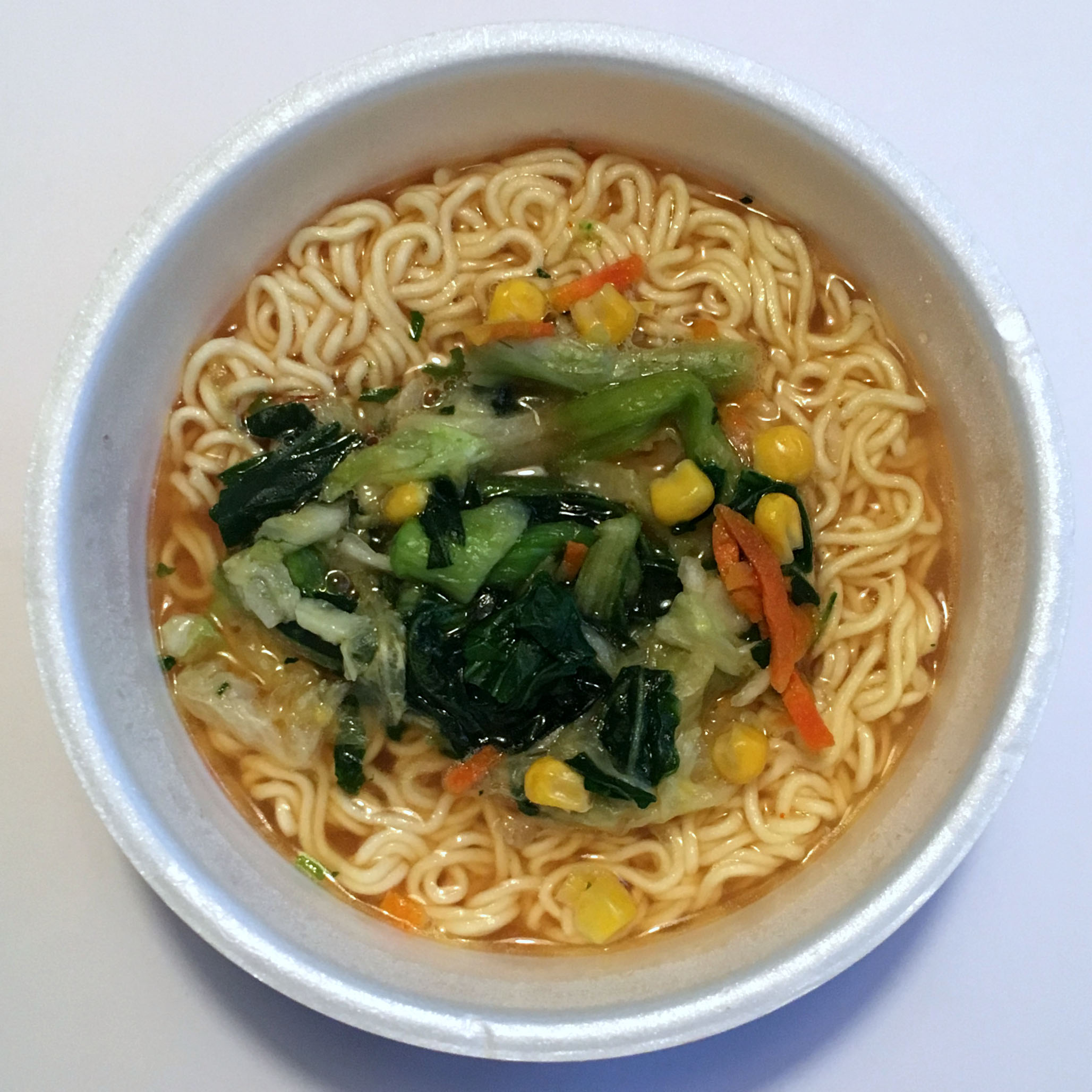
Sapporo Ichiban cup noodle, miso flavored

=== Ramen ===
Ramen flavors include:

- "Original" (Red package) a mild soy sauce flavor, debuted in stores January 1966.
- Miso (Orange package), debuted in stores September 1968.
- Shio (Salt) (Black and Red package), debuted in stores August 1971.
- Tonkotsu (Gold package)
- Chicken (Green package)
- Beef (Brown package)
- Shrimp (Pink package)
- Hot & Spicy Chicken (Green and Red package)
- Original Cup
- Chicken Cup
- Beef Cup
- Shrimp Cup

=== Non-ramen products ===
- Yakisoba / Chow mein (Yellow, orange and white package). This is not a ramen soup, but ramen noodles meant to be reconstituted, then stir-fried with the enclosed flavour package. Traditionally, ground beef and Chinese cabbage are added to the stir-fry and seaweed is sprinkled on top from the included pouch if preparing yakisoba, but only the seaweed is included in the package.
- Kitsune – Kitsune udon (Blue and white package). This is a package of dehydrated udon noodles instead of ramen, with a reconstitutable square of tofu. This item has been discontinued in the United States in spite of great demand found online.

== See also ==
- List of instant noodle brands
- Cup noodles
- Koka noodles
- Maggi noodles
- Shin Ramyun
- Wai-Wai (food)
