= Shiawase ni Naru Tame ni =

1993 single by Miho Nakayama

Single by Miho Nakayama

from the album Blanket Privacy
- Language: Japanese
- English title: To Be Happy
- B-side: "P.S. Natsu no Kuni kara"
- Released: April 21, 1993
- Recorded: 1992
- Genre: J-pop
- Length: 4:18
- Label: King Records
- Composer: Toshifumi Hinata
- Lyricists: Yuho Iwasato; Miho Nakayama

Miho Nakayama singles chronology
"Sekaijū no Dare Yori Kitto" (1992)	"Shiawase ni Naru Tame ni" (1993)	"Anata ni Nara..." (1993)

"Shiawase ni Naru Tame ni" (幸せになるために; lit. "To Be Happy") is the 26th single by Japanese entertainer Miho Nakayama. Written by Nakayama, Yuho Iwasato, and Toshifumi Hinata, the single was released on April 21, 1993, by King Records.

== Background and release ==
"Shiawase ni Naru Tame ni" was used as the theme song of the NHK TV serial Ēnyobo (ええにょぼ), marking the first time Nakayama recorded a theme song for a TV program she did not star in.

"Shiawase ni Naru Tame ni" peaked at No. 4 on Oricon's weekly singles chart. It sold over 414,000 copies and was certified Platinum by the RIAJ.

Nakayama performed the song on the 44th Kōhaku Uta Gassen in 1993.

== Track listing ==
8cm CD single
No.	Title	Lyrics	Music	Arrangement	Length
1.	"Shiawase ni Naru Tame ni (幸せになるために; lit. '"To Be Happy"')"	Yuho Iwasato; Miho Nakayama	Toshifumi Hinata	Hinata	4:18
2.	"P.S. Natsu no Kuni kara (P.S. 夏の国から; lit. '"P.S. From a Summer Country"')"	Yui Nishiwaki	Nishiwaki	Nobuo Ariga	5:46
3.	"Shiawase ni Naru Tame ni" (Original Karaoke)				4:17

== Charts ==
Weekly charts

Chart (1993)	Peak position
Oricon Weekly Singles Chart	4

Year-end charts

Chart (1993)	Peak position
Oricon Year-End Chart	69

== Certification ==
Region	Certification	Certified units/sales
Japan (RIAJ)	Platinum	400,000^{^}
^{^} Shipments figures based on certification alone.
