= Sea Paradise (OL no Hanran) =

1994 single by Miho Nakayama

Single by Miho Nakayama

from the album Pure White
- Language: Japanese
- English title: Sea Paradise (An Office Lady's Rebellion)
- B-side: "Nando demo Aiseru kara"
- Released: June 8, 1994
- Recorded: 1994
- Genre: J-pop; R&B
- Length: 6:20
- Label: King Records
- Composer: KNACK
- Lyricist: Miho Nakayama

Miho Nakayama singles chronology
"Tada Nakitaku Naru no" (1994)	"Sea Paradise (OL no Hanran)" (1994)	"Hero" (1994)

"Sea Paradise (OL no Hanran)" (Sea Paradise -OLの反乱-; lit. "Sea Paradise -An Office Lady's Rebellion-") is the 29th single by Japanese entertainer Miho Nakayama. Written by Nakayama and KNACK, the single was released on June 8, 1994, by King Records.

== Background and release ==
"Sea Paradise (OL no Hanran)" was Nakayama's only single to be issued in CD+G format, allowing on-screen lyrics to be displayed on karaoke machines and some CD-ROM-based devices. On live TV performances of the song, Nakayama wore a pink office lady outfit.

"Sea Paradise (OL no Hanran)" peaked at No. 9 on Oricon's weekly singles chart. It sold over 154,000 copies and was certified Gold by the RIAJ.

== Track listing ==
All lyrics are written by Miho Nakayama; all music is arranged by ATOM.

8cm CD+G single
No.	Title	Music	Length
1.	"Sea Paradise (OL no Hanran)" ((Sea Paradise -OLの反乱-; "Sea Paradise -An Office Lady's Rebellion-"))	KNACK	6:20
2.	"Nando demo Aiseru kara" ((何度でも愛せるから; "I Can Love You Again and Again"))	Nakayama	5:04
3.	"Sea Paradise (OL no Hanran)" (Original Karaoke)		6:22

== Charts ==
Chart (1994)	Peak position
Oricon Weekly Singles Chart	9

== Certification ==
Region	Certification	Certified units/sales
Japan (RIAJ)	Gold	200,000^{^}
^{^} Shipments figures based on certification alone.
