= Anata ni Nara... =

1993 single by Miho Nakayama

Single by Miho Nakayama

from the album Blanket Privacy
- Language: Japanese
- English title: For You...
- B-side: "Holiday"
- Released: July 7, 1993
- Recorded: 1993
- Genre: J-pop
- Length: 5:28
- Label: King Records
- Composer: Joe Hisaishi
- Lyricist: Miho Nakayama

Miho Nakayama singles chronology
"Shiawase ni Naru Tame ni" (1993)	"Anata ni Nara..." (1993)	"Tada Nakitaku Naru no" (1994)

"Anata ni Nara..." (あなたになら...; lit. "For You...") is the 27th single by Japanese entertainer Miho Nakayama. Written by Nakayama and Joe Hisaishi, the single was released on July 7, 1993, by King Records.

== Background and release ==
"Anata ni Nara..." was recorded in London and used as the theme song of the Toho film Samurai Kids. The B-side, "Holiday", was used by Asahi Soft Drinks for their Tea Quality commercials.

"Anata ni Nara" peaked at No. 8 on Oricon's weekly singles chart. It sold over 280,000 copies and was certified Gold by the RIAJ.

Hisaishi self-covered the song in English as "I Believe in You" on his 1995 album Melody Blvd.

== Track listing ==
8cm CD single
No.	Title	Lyrics	Music	Arrangement	Length
1.	"Anata ni Nara..." ("For You..." (あなたになら...))	Miho Nakayama	Joe Hisaishi	Hisaishi	5:28
2.	"Holiday"	Mami Takubo	Masaya Ozeki	URAN	5:24
3.	"Anata ni Nara..." (Original Karaoke)				5:28

== Charts ==
Chart (1993)	Peak position
Oricon Weekly Singles Chart	8

== Certification ==
Region	Certification	Certified units/sales
Japan (RIAJ)	Gold	200,000^{^}
^{^} Shipments figures based on certification alone.
