= Hurt to Heart (Itami no Yukue) =

1995 single by Miho Nakayama

Single by Miho Nakayama

from the album Mid Blue
- Language: Japanese
- English title: Hurt to Heart (Whereabouts of Pain)
- B-side: "I Love You"
- Released: July 21, 1995
- Recorded: 1995
- Genre: J-pop
- Length: 5:14
- Label: King Records
- Composer: Keiko Yokoyama
- Lyricist: Keiko Yokoyama

Miho Nakayama singles chronology
"Cheers for You" (1995)	"Hurt to Heart (Itami no Yukue)" (1995)	"Thinking About You (Anata no Yoru wo Tsutsumitai)" (1996)

"Hurt to Heart (Itami no Yukue)" (Hurt to Heart〜痛みの行方〜; lit. "Hurt to Heart ~Whereabouts of Pain~") is the 32nd single by Japanese entertainer Miho Nakayama. Written by Keiko Yokoyama, the single was released on July 21, 1995, by King Records.

== Background and release ==
"Hurt to Heart (Itami no Yukue)" was used as the theme song of the TBS drama series Hito Natsu no Love Letter (ひと夏のラブレター, Hito Natsu no Rabu Retā; One Summer Love Letter). The B-side, "I Love You", was used as an insert song in the drama.

"Hurt to Heart (Itami no Yukue)" peaked at No. 10 on Oricon's weekly singles chart. It sold over 319,000 copies and was certified Gold by the RIAJ.

== Track listing ==
All music is arranged by Jerry Hey.

8cm CD single
No.	Title	Lyrics	Music	Length
1.	"Hurt to Heart (Itami no Yukue)" ((Hurt to Heart〜痛みの行方〜; "Hurt to Heart ~Whereabouts of Pain~"))	Keiko Yokoyama	Yokoyama	5:14
2.	"I Love You"	Miho Nakayama	Cindy	5:01
3.	"Hurt to Heart (Itami no Yukue)" (Original Karaoke)			5:13
4.	"I Love You" (Original Karaoke)			4:58

== Charts ==
Chart (1995)	Peak position
Oricon Weekly Singles Chart	10

== Certification ==
Region	Certification	Certified units/sales
Japan (RIAJ)	Gold	200,000^{^}
^{^} Shipments figures based on certification alone.
