= Rosa (Miho Nakayama song) =

1991 single by Miho Nakayama

Single by Miho Nakayama

from the album Miho's Select
- Language: Japanese
- B-side: "Dream"
- Released: July 16, 1991
- Recorded: 1991
- Genre: J-pop; dance-pop
- Length: 5:13
- Label: King Records
- Composer: Yoshimasa Inoue
- Lyricist: Issaque

Miho Nakayama singles chronology
"Kore kara no I Love You" (1991)	"Rosa" (1991)	"Tōi Machi no Doko ka de..." (1991)

"Rosa" (ローザ, Rōza) is the 22nd single by Japanese entertainer Miho Nakayama. Written by Nakayama (under the pseudonym "Issaque") and Yoshimasa Inoue, the single was released on July 16, 1991, by King Records.

== Background and release ==
"Rosa" is the first collaboration between Nakayama and musician Yoshimasa Inoue. Prior to the recording of the song, Nakayama originally titled it "Chotto Dōshita no" (チョットドウシタノ; "Wait, Why?") before settling with the current title to match its flamenco motif.

"Rosa" became Nakayama's fifth straight No. 3 on Oricon's weekly singles chart. It sold over 362,000 copies and was certified Gold by the RIAJ.

Nakayama performed the song on the 42nd Kōhaku Uta Gassen in 1991.

== Track listing ==
All lyrics are written my Issaque; all music is composed by Yoshimasa Inoue; all music is arranged by ATOM.

8cm CD single
No.	Title	Length
1.	"Rosa"	5:13
2.	"Dream"	3:55

== Charts ==
Weekly charts

Chart (1991)	Peak position
Oricon Weekly Singles Chart	3

Year-end charts

Chart (1991)	Peak position
Oricon Year-End Chart	41

== Certification ==
Region	Certification	Certified units/sales
Japan (RIAJ)	Gold	200,000^{^}
^{^} Shipments figures based on certification alone.
