= Tada Nakitaku Naru no =

1994 single by Miho Nakayama

Single by Miho Nakayama

from the album Collection III
- Language: Japanese
- English title: I Just Feel Like Crying
- B-side: "Tada Nakitaku Naru no (Another Edition)"
- Released: February 9, 1994
- Recorded: 1993
- Genre: J-pop
- Length: 5:05
- Label: King Records
- Composer: Masaki Iwamoto
- Lyricists: Yurie Kokubu; Miho Nakayama

Miho Nakayama singles chronology
"Anata ni Nara..." (1993)	"Tada Nakitaku Naru no" (1994)	"Sea Paradise (OL no Hanran)" (1994)

Audio sample
- "Tada Nakitaku Naru no": file; help

"Tada Nakitaku Naru no" (ただ泣(な)きたくなるの; lit. "I Just Feel Like Crying") is the 28th single by Japanese entertainer Miho Nakayama. Written by Yurie Kokubu, Nakayama, and Masaki Iwamoto, the single was released on February 9, 1994, by King Records.

== Background ==
"Tada Nakitaku Naru no" is composed in the key of B flat major and set to a tempo of 87 beats per minute. Nakayama's vocals span from G_{3} to D_{5}. Lyrically, it tells the story of a woman feeling left behind by her friends who are getting married one by one. The song was used as the theme song of the TBS drama series Moshimo Negai ga Kanau Nara (もしも願いが叶うなら; If Your Wish Comes True), which also starred Nakayama.

Nakayama performed the song on the 45th Kōhaku Uta Gassen in 1994, marking her seventh and final appearance on NHK's New Year's Eve special. In 2015, she performed the song for the first time in 18 years on national TV during the 2015 FNS Music Festival, earning the most-watched segment of the broadcast. She self-covered the song on her 2019 album Neuf Neuf.

== Chart performance ==
"Tada Nakitaku Naru no" debuted at number 3 on the Oricon Singles Chart with 141,000 copies sold in its first week. The song stalled at number 2 the following week, with 106,000 copies sold, kept off the number-one spot by B'z's "Don't Leave Me". It slid to number 3 the next week, logging sales of 88,000 copies. "Tada Nakitaku Naru no" finally reached the top of the chart on its fourth charting week, selling 98,000 units on that week. The single spent the following two weeks at number 2, behind "Hey Hey Ōki ni Maido Ari" by SMAP and "Gambaranakucha ne" by Lindberg, respectively, selling a combined total of 202,000 singles. The single remained in the top ten for an additional four weeks and dropped off the top twenty two weeks later.

"Tada Nakitaku Naru no" charted in the top 100 for 18 weeks, selling a reported total of 1,048,000 copies during its run and becoming Nakayama's best-selling solo single, as well as the 100th single in Oricon history to break the million sales mark. The song was the number-one selling single for March 1994 and ranked at number 17 on the year-end Oricon Singles Chart.

== Track listing ==
All lyrics are written by Yurie Kokubu and Miho Nakayama; all music is composed by Masaki Iwamoto.

8cm CD single
No.	Title	Arrangement	Length
1.	"Tada Nakitaku Naru no" ((ただ泣きたくなるの; "I Just Feel Like Crying"))	Masaki Iwamoto	5:05
2.	"Tada Nakitaku Naru no" (Another Edition)	ATOM+1	5:11
3.	"Tada Nakitaku Naru no" (Original Karaoke)	Iwamoto	5:03
Total length:			15:19

== Charts ==
Chart (1994)	Peak position
Japan Weekly Singles (Oricon)	1
Japan Monthly Singles (Oricon)	1
Japan Yearly Singles (Oricon)	17

== Certifications ==
Region	Certification	Certified units/sales
Japan (RIAJ)	2× Platinum	1,048,000
Japan (RIAJ) Digital	Gold	100,000^{*}
^{*} Sales figures based on certification alone.

== Cover versions ==
- Yurie Kokubu self-covered the song on her 1995 album Akogare.
- Yūzō Imai covered the song on is 2010 album Kimi to Aruita Jikan.
- Kim Jeong-hoon covered the song on his 2012 cover album Voice.
- Shoko Inoue covered the song on her 2013 cover album Kaisōroku: Calling 90's.
- Ko Shibasaki covered the song on her 2015 cover album Kō Utau.
- May J. recorded a cover of the song on her 2016 cover album, Sweet Song Covers.

== See also ==
- List of Oricon number-one singles
