= Yurie Kokubu =

Japanese singer

Yurie Kokubu 国分友里恵
- Genres: City pop, anime song, hymn
- Years active: 1983-present
- Formerly of: Shambara
- Spouse: Masaki Iwamoto
- Website: kokubuyurie.com

Yurie Kokubu (国分 友里恵, Kokubu Yurie) is a Japanese singer, songwriter and lyricist. Originally a vocalist for television and Yoshihiro Naruse's band Quyz, she was hired by Tetsuji Hayashi after he listened to one of Quyz' recordings and decided to produce her first album, and she later released six more albums. She has been active in Christian music since the 1990s, and her music has returned to attention due to the 2010s/2020s city pop wave.

== Biography ==
Kokubu, born to Christian parents, originally studied classical piano and vocals. She was a vocalist for NHK Educational TV and the TBS variety show Hachiji da yo! Zen'in shūgō, and while studying at high school, she played for the rock band as their vocalist. However, she became interested in soul music after finding "drawn to soul singers such as Aretha Franklin as she continued her musical journey".

Kokubu was a vocalist for Yoshihiro Naruse's band Quyz. Tetsuji Hayashi hired Kokubu after listening to one of Quyz's recordings, and then produced her debut album Relief 72 Hours, released in 1983. Her next two albums, Steps (1987) and Silent Moon (1990), were both produced by Masaki Iwamoto. She performed the song "Only in My Dreams" for the 1990 film City Hunter: Million Dollar Conspiracy. She later released four more albums, with her 1997 album Reservations for Two produced by Kashif in Los Angeles.

Kokubu's 1991 song "Koi no Navigation" was a commercial song for Nippon Oil Corporation's Dash Racer 100. Her songs "How To Love You" (1992) and "Akogare" (1994) were the ending themes for the TBS late-night show Marutokojirushi no Kuruma wa Erai and the NTV documentary show Do You Really Know About It?! (respectively), while "Ai o Mune ni" (1995) and "Shindemo ī" (1997) were the theme songs for the TBS drama Kazetachi no Yuigon and Fuji drama Hyōen: Shindemo ī (respectively).

Kokubu often worked as a vocalist for other singers, including Toshiki Kadomatsu; one of her songs, It's Hard to Say Goodbye: Sayōnara wa Ai no Kotoba, was a duet with Kadomatsu. She participated in Noriki's 1983 album Noriki. She was the vocalist of Shambara, a band led and formed in 1989 by Casiopea members Tetsuo Sakurai and Akira Jimbo. She also went into songwriting, with her work including the 1994 Miho Nakayama song "Tada Nakitaku Naru no". She performed at Tatsuro Yamashita's Performance '98-'99 tour as a replacement vocalist for the recently deceased Nozomi Takao.

In 1996, Kokubu started releasing Christian music, including several albums. She had become interested in the genre after she and Iwamoto thought of "making a song that sounds like a hymn". In 2016, she and Kadomatsu hosted a talk event commemorating the premiere of the American biblical film Risen.

Motohiro Makaino, writing for Reminder, remarked that Kokubu is "celebrated for her broad musical versatility—ranging from funky numbers and city soul tracks to heartfelt ballads". Shirō Kuwahara of Bounce noted that some of her popular songs have a Black contemporary aesthetic, and that crossover music, namely Patti Austin, Randy Crawford, and Esther Phillips, is influential in her work. Shunkan Shōjo, also of Reminder, said that one of her albums, Steps, "succeeds in conveying the full scope of Yurie Kokubu's talents", speculating that Iwamoto and the album's composer Hitoshi Haba sought to "maximize Kokubu's inherent strengths" and gave her "the freedom to interpret 80s new wave and synth-pop in her own unique way".

Kokubu is among several artists who have returned to attention due to the 2010s/2020s city pop wave. In 2014, Tower Records released Blu-spec CD2 versions of Steps (1987), Silent Moon (1990), and Reservations for Two (1997). By November 2020, used vinyl copies of Steps reached ¥33,000, a price out of reach for "anyone other than a dedicated collector". In October 2024, she released her first best hits album, Kokubu Yurie Best Collection (国分友里恵 Best Collection); containing 32 songs involving Kokubu, the album received notice for its diversity, with Bounce remarking that it spanned from "songs infused with that quintessential 80s-style Black contemporary flavor [to] stylish, urban-centric tunes from Noriki's catalog on which she appeared as a guest vocalist". Her debut album appeared in Hitoshi Kurimoto's 2022 book "City Pop no Kihon" ga Kono 100-mai de Wakaru!, and Kuwahara said that that the album is "widely regarded as a pinnacle of the [city pop] genre".

Kokubu married composer Masaki Iwamoto in 1985. She is a Christian, having been baptized in 1996. She has a younger brother.

== Discography ==
=== Singles ===
- "Koi no Navigation" (21 July 1991, BMG Victor)
- "How To Love You" (25 March 1992, BMG Victor)
- "Akogare" (16 December 1994, Victor Entertainment)
- "Ai o Mune ni" (21 April 1995, Victor Entertainment)
- "Shindemo ī" (23 April 1997, BMG Victor)

=== Albums ===
==== Original studio albums ====
- Relief 72 Hours (1983)
- Steps (1987)
- Silent Moon (21 September 1990, BMG Victor)
- Do You Love Me (21 August 1991, BMG Victor)
- Akogare (24 March 1995, Victor Entertainment)
- Whisper Whisper (21 February 1996, Victor Entertainment)
- Reservations for Two (21 August 1997, BMG Victor)
- Futari dake no kotoba (1999)
- Savior (2001)

==== Cover albums ====
- Traditional Hymns vol. 1: Kimi mo soka ni itanoka (1999)
- Traditional Hymns vol. 2: Nobody Knows... Waga nami shinrita mō (2003)
- Steal Away: Yes no Ai ni Idakarete Yukō (20 May 2005)
- Gendai Sanbika (2009, with Masaki Iwamoto)
- Kono Hito wo Miyo (15 May 2019)

==== Other albums ====
- Kokubu Yurie Best Collection (2024)
