= Mind Game (album) =

Studio album by Miho Nakayama
- Released: July 11, 1988
- Recorded: 1988
- Genre: J-pop; city pop; dance-pop
- Length: 47:44
- Language: Japanese
- Label: King Records
- Producer: Akira Fukuzumi

Miho Nakayama chronology
Catch the Nite (1988)	Mind Game (1988)	Makin' Dancin' (1988)

Mind Game (マインド・ゲーム, Maindo Gēmu) is the seventh studio album by Japanese entertainer Miho Nakayama. Released through King Records on July 11, 1988, the album was Nakayama's second release after One and Only to not feature any singles. The album cover is a painting of Nakayama in a bikini by Robert Blue; it was also used as the jacket cover of the single "Mermaid".

"Long Distance to the Heaven" was written by Nakayama (under her pseudonym "Mizuho Kitamura") in memory of friend Yasuko Endō, who committed suicide on March 30, 1986. The song was originally titled "Long Distance Tengoku e" (Long Distance 天国へ), but it was retitled after Endō's debut single "In the Distance" was cancelled due to her death.

The album peaked at No. 2 on Oricon's albums chart and sold over 252,000 copies.

== Track listing ==
All music is arranged by Takao Sugiyama, except where indicated.

Side A
No.	Title	Lyrics	Music	Arrangement	Length
1.	"Into the Crowd"	Mizuho Kitayama	Ichirō Hada	Hada	1:07
2.	"Strange Parade"	Rui Serizawa	Hada		3:24
3.	"Why Not?"	Serizawa	Hada		3:31
4.	"Cat Walk"	Serizawa	Kitarō	Kitarō	3:43
5.	"Moonlight Sexy Dance"	Chinfa Kan	Hada		4:26
6.	"In the Morning"	Masumi Kawamura	Toshinobu Kubota		5:19
Total length:					21:41

Side B
No.	Title	Lyrics	Music	Length
1.	"Mind Game"	Serizawa	Cindy; Hada	4:38
2.	"I Know"	Serizawa	Cindy	5:29
3.	"Velvet Hammer"	Kawamura	Kubota	3:40
4.	"Take It Easy"	Kawamura	Kubota	4:30
5.	"Long Distance to the Heaven"	Kitayama	Kitayama	5:20
6.	"Husky Town"	Serizawa	Hada	2:26
Total length:				26:03

== Personnel ==
- Miho Nakayama – vocals
- Yōichirō "Iseley" Kakizaki – synthesizer (A1–2), electric piano (A2), Fender Rhodes (B2)
- Takao Sugiyama - synthesizer (except A4), drum programming (A2, A5–6), bass (A5)
- Ichirō Hada - guitar (A1–6, B1, B3–4), drum programming (A1)
- Hiroshi Narumi – acoustic guitar (B2)
- Kitarō – bass (A1–4, B1–5), synthesizer (A6), drums (B1), backing vocals (B4)
- Kaoru Abe – drums (A3, B2–4)
- "Kimuchi" Kimura – percussion (A4, B2, B4)
- Toshihiko Furumura – saxophone (A3)
- Amazons – backing vocals (except B1–2, B6)

- Tomoko Yoshikawa
- Kumi Saitō
- Yūko Ōtaki

- Darek Jackson – backing vocals (A4)
- Yoshie "Cherry" Shimizu – backing vocals (A4)
- Cindy – backing vocals (B1–2)
- Mine Matsuki – backing vocals (B1–2)
- Michael Wilson – backing vocals (B1–2)

== Charts ==
Weekly charts

Chart (1988)	Peak position
Japanese Albums (Oricon)	2

Year-end charts

Chart (1988)	Peak position
Japanese Albums (Oricon)	36

== See also ==
- 1988 in Japanese music
