= Tōi Machi no Doko ka de... =

1991 single by Miho Nakayama

Single by Miho Nakayama

from the album Miho's Select
- Language: Japanese
- English title: Somewhere in a Distant City...
- B-side: "Tell Me"
- Released: November 1, 1991
- Recorded: 1991
- Genre: J-pop; Christmas
- Length: 5:57
- Label: King Records
- Composer: Hideya Nakazaki
- Lyricist: Mika Watanabe

Miho Nakayama singles chronology
"Rosa" (1991)	"Tōi Machi no Doko ka de..." (1991)	"Mellow" (1992)

"Tōi Machi no Doko ka de..." (遠い街のどこかで…; lit. "Somewhere in a Distant City...") is the 23rd single by Japanese entertainer Miho Nakayama. Written by Mika Watanabe and Hideya Nakazaki, the single was released on November 1, 1991, by King Records.

== Background and release ==
"Tōi Machi no Doko ka de..." is a Christmas song used as the theme song of the Fuji TV drama series Aitai Toki ni Anata wa Inai... (逢いたい時にあなたはいない…; You Are Not When You Want to Meet...), which also starred Nakayama. Like the drama, the song is themed on long-distance relationships. As of 2019, it was used by USEN Corporation as one of the company's background songs during the Christmas season.

"Tōi Machi no Doko ka de..." became Nakayama's sixth straight No. 3 on Oricon's weekly singles chart. It sold over 673,000 copies and was certified Platinum by the RIAJ, becoming her biggest-selling single until "Sekaijū no Dare Yori Kitto" a year later.

== Track listing ==
All lyrics are written by Mika Watanabe.

8cm CD single
No.	Title	Music	Arrangement	Length
1.	"Tōi Machi no Doko ka de..." ((遠い街のどこかで…; "Somewhere in a Distant City..."))	Hideya Nakazaki	Nakazaki	5:57
2.	"Tell Me"	Watanabe	Yōichi Yamazaki	5:02
3.	"Tōi Machi no Doko ka de..." (Original Karaoke)			5:55

== Charts ==
Weekly charts

Chart (1991)	Peak position
Oricon Weekly Singles Chart	3

Year-end charts

Chart (1991)	Peak position
Oricon Year-End Chart	42

Chart (1992)	Peak position
Oricon Year-End Chart	49

== Certification ==
Region	Certification	Certified units/sales
Japan (RIAJ)	Platinum	400,000^{^}
^{^} Shipments figures based on certification alone.
