= Mellow (Miho Nakayama album) =

Studio album by Miho Nakayama
- Released: June 10, 1992
- Recorded: 1992
- Genre: J-pop; pop rock; R&B; dance-pop
- Length: 56:57
- Language: Japanese
- Label: King Records
- Producer: Miho Nakayama; Masato Osumi

Miho Nakayama chronology
Miho's Select (1991)	Mellow (1992)	Dramatic Songs (1993)

Singles from Mellow
- 1. "Mellow" Released: April 1, 1992

Mellow (メロウ, Merou) is the 14th studio album by Japanese entertainer Miho Nakayama. Released through King Records on June 10, 1992, it features the single "Mellow". The album was co-produced by Nakayama and recorded in Los Angeles. She wrote majority of the album's songs; both under her real name and her pseudonym "Issaque" (一咲, Issaku). A limited edition release included a mini photo book featuring pictures taken during the Los Angeles recording sessions.

The album peaked at No. 3 on Oricon's albums chart. It also sold over 140,000 copies and was certified Gold by the RIAJ.

== Track listing ==
No.	Title	Lyrics	Music	Arrangement	Length
1.	"Mellow"	Issaque	Yoshimasa Inoue	Y. Inoue	5:50
2.	"Arukinasai." ((あるきなさい。; "Come On."))	Miho Nakayama	Yūsuke Asada	Asada	6:03
3.	"Yukkuri My Love" ((ゆっくりMy Love; "Slowly My Love"))	Nakayama	Masaya Ozeki	Nittoku Inoue	5:18
4.	"Platinum Cat"	Issaque	Y. Inoue	Y. Inoue	5:50
5.	"Silent"	Nakayama	Chiho Kiyooka	Yoshio Tsuru	5:02
6.	"Wasurenakute mo Ii ja Nai" ((忘れなくてもいいじゃない; "You Don't Have to Forget"))	Chiharu Akahoshi; Nakayama	Ozeki	Hiroshi Shinkawa	4:44
7.	"Shakunetsu no Kokoro" ((灼熱の心; "Burning Heart"))	Mika Watanabe; Nakayama	Watanabe	N. Inoue	5:43
8.	"Hanashi wo Kiite" ((はなしをきいて; "Listen to the Story"))	Nakayama	Joey Carbone; Jeff Caruthers	Hiroshi Narumi; Makio Tada	5:54
9.	"Kiss Kiss Kiss"	Nakayama	Narumi; Tada	Narumi; Tada	4:54
10.	"Treasure"	Yui Nishiwaki	Nishiwaki; Yōko Orihara	Nobuo Ariga	5:51
11.	"Mellow [CM Version]"	Issaque	Y. Inoue	Y. Inoue	1:48
Total length:					56:57

== Charts ==
Chart (1992)	Peak position
Japanese Albums (Oricon)	3

== Certification ==
Region	Certification	Certified units/sales
Japan (RIAJ)	Gold	200,000^{^}
^{^} Shipments figures based on certification alone.
