= Merry Merry =

Studio album by Miho Nakayama
- Released: December 5, 1989
- Recorded: 1989
- Genres: J-pop; Christmas
- Length: 34:26
- Languages: English; Japanese
- Label: King Records
- Producers: Miho Nakayama; Akira Fukuzumi

Miho Nakayama chronology
Hide 'n' Seek (1989)	Merry Merry (1989)	All for You (1990)

Alternate cover
- Limited Edition cover

Merry Merry (メリー・メリー, Merī Merī) is the tenth studio album by Japanese entertainer Miho Nakayama. Released through King Records on December 5, 1989, it is a Christmas-themed album, featuring five song covers, two original songs written by Nakayama (under the pseudonym "Mizuho Kitayama"), and an instrumental version of her 1988 song "Long Distance to the Heaven". It is also the first album that Nakayama produced herself. A limited edition release included a 20-page hardcover storybook adaptation of "Long Distance to the Heaven".

The album peaked at No. 9 on Oricon's albums chart and sold over 110,000 copies.

== Track listing ==
All music is arranged by Kazuo Ōtani.

No.	Title	Writer(s)	Length
1.	"Some Day at Christmas"	Ron Miller; Bryan Wells	3:39
2.	"White Christmas"	Irving Berlin	4:54
3.	"Without You"	Mizuho Kitayama	5:38
4.	"I Saw Mommy Kissing Santa Claus"	Tommie Connor	2:37
5.	"Say Love Me"	Kitayama	5:56
6.	"Have Yourself a Merry Little Christmas"	Hugh Martin; Ralph Blane	4:52
7.	"Silent Night, Holy Night"	Franz Xaver Gruber; John F. Young	3:19
8.	"Long Distance to the Heaven" (Instrumental Version for the Short Story)	Kitayama	3:31
Total length:			34:26

== Charts ==
Chart (1989)	Peak position
Japanese Albums (Oricon)	9

== See also ==
- 1989 in Japanese music
