= One and Only (Miho Nakayama album) =

Studio album by Miho Nakayama
- Released: July 15, 1987
- Recorded: 1987
- Studio: Free Port; Sound Valley; Hitokuchizaka Tokio; Artisan Sound Recorders; Baby'O LAX
- Genre: J-pop; kayōkyoku; dance-pop; teen pop
- Length: 38:37
- Language: Japanese
- Label: King Records
- Producer: Norio Higuchi

Miho Nakayama chronology
Exotique (1986)	One and Only (1987)	Collection (1987)

One and Only (ワン・アンド・オンリー, Wan ando Onrī) is the fifth studio album by Japanese entertainer Miho Nakayama. Released through King Records on July 15, 1987, the album features no singles, but was the first to feature Nakayama as a songwriter (under the pseudonym "Mizuho Kitayama" (北山瑞穂, Kitayama Mizuho)). It was also her first album to be recorded outside Japan.

The album peaked at No. 3 on Oricon's albums chart and sold over 153,000 copies.

== Track listing ==
Side A
No.	Title	Lyrics	Music	Arrangement	Length
1.	"Liberty Girl"	Mizuho Kitayama	Takeru Satō	Shirō Sagisu	4:36
2.	"Singapore"	Shun Taguchi	Toshinobu Kubota	Motoki Funayama	3:54
3.	"Linne Magic"	Taguchi	Tetsuya Komuro	Sagisu	4:18
4.	"Okocchai na Rendezvous" (おこっChaiなランデブー (Okotchai na Randebū))	Masaya Ozeki	Ozeki	Sagisu	3:43
5.	"Kanashimi no Rider" (Kanashimi no Raidā (悲しみのライダー; "Rider of Sadness"))	EPO	Nobuyuki Shimizu	Shimizu	3:30
Total length:					20:01

Side B
No.	Title	Lyrics	Music	Arrangement	Length
1.	"By-By My Sea Breeze"	Taguchi	Kubota	Funayama	3:19
2.	"Manatsu wa Nonfiction" ((真夏はNonfiction; "Midsummer Is Nonfiction"))	Hiroka Hasuda	Satō	Shimizu	3:54
3.	"Time Up"	Hasuda	HALNEN	Shimizu	3:14
4.	"Kesshin" ((決心; "Decision"))	Rui Serizawa	Satō	Shimizu	3:55
5.	"Silent Night"	Serizawa	Hideya Nakazaki	Shimizu	4:14
Total length:					18:38

== Personnel ==
- Miho Nakayama – vocals
- George Rossi – percussion (A2)
- Augie Johnson – backing vocals
- Carmen – backing vocals
- James Studer – backing vocals

== Charts ==
Chart (1987)	Peak position
Japanese Albums (Oricon)	3

== See also ==
- 1987 in Japanese music
