= The Ballads (Mariah Carey album) =

2008 compilation album by Mariah Carey

Compilation album by Mariah Carey
- Released: October 17, 2008 (International); January 20, 2009 (North America)
- Length: 70:41 (UK); 75:32 (US); 76:10 (Japan)
- Labels: Columbia; Legacy
- Producers: Mariah Carey; Walter Afanasieff; Jermaine Dupri; Manuel Seal; Rhett Lawrence; Jam & Lewis; Dave Hall; DJ Clue; Trackmasters; Stevie J; Mike Mason; Steve Mac; Babyface

Mariah Carey chronology
E=MC² (2008)	The Ballads (2008)	Memoirs of an Imperfect Angel (2009)

The Ballads is the third compilation album by American singer Mariah Carey. The album features some of Carey's top-selling ballads over the course of her career. It was released internationally in late 2008, in North America in January 2009, and in the United Kingdom in February 2010. It debuted at number ten on the US Billboard 200, marking the highest debut of the week, and also peaked atop the UK R&B Albums Chart.

== Background and release ==
The album was announced in 2008 and was set to feature various ballads both from Carey's time at Columbia Records and from the soundtrack album, Glitter (2001). The album did not feature any new material or any songs from then-label, Island Records. The album was released internationally on various dates from October 2008, and later released throughout North America on January 20, 2009. For the North American release of the album, Carey re-recorded her 1993 single "Hero". A music video was shot which showed Carey singing in a recording room accompanied by her dog. It is intercut with a scene of New York City during the night. The album was later re-released in the United Kingdom under a new title, LoveSongs, on February 8, 2010.

== Promotion ==
Carey performed "Hero" at the Inauguration of Barack Obama on January 20, 2009, in Washington, D.C., and was featured on a CBS TV special. A limited edition of The Ballads was being sold exclusively at all Target Stores; this edition included a small bottle of Carey's fragrance Luscious Pink.

== Critical reception ==
The Ballads ratings
Review scores
Source	Rating
AllMusic	3.5/5 stars

Blogcritics said: "This release is a different type of Mariah Carey album. Without her faster and hip hop songs, it is smoother as it puts the focus squarely on her vocals which has always been her greatest attribute and saving grace". AllMusic stated, "And that's what The Ballads is: nothing but big love songs sung in a big voice." Billboard stated that the album "will keep singing on the chart as we get closer to Valentine's Day, as it seems like a natural gift purchase."

== Commercial performance ==
The album debuted at number 17 on UK Albums Chart. Following a successful appearance on X Factor, the album peaked at number 13 in its 4th week and remained on chart for ten consecutive weeks. In 2018, the Official Charts Company reported that the album listed amongst Carey's top ten biggest albums on the chart. In Ireland, the album peaked at number 8 and remained on chart for twelve weeks, and has been certified gold. In New Zealand, the album peaked at number 19, remaining on chart for three weeks. The album also debuted at number 79 in Australia. In Japan, the album has reached number 19. The album debuted at number 45 on the Dutch Albums Chart and fell nine spots behind in the second week. In the third week the album climbed from number 54 to 5.

In 2009 for its American release, the album debuted at number 10 on the US Billboard 200 with first week sales of 29,000 units. It was the chart's highest debut that week Carey's fourth compilation album to chart, following #1's (number 4 in 1998), Greatest Hits (number 52 in 2001) and The Remixes (number 26 in 2003). It also debut at number 7 on the Top R&B/Hip-Hop Albums chart. As of November 2018, the album has sold 395,000 copies in the US.

== Track listing ==
American release
No.	Title	Album	Length
1.	"Hero"	Music Box	4:19
2.	"One Sweet Day" (featuring Boyz II Men)	Daydream	4:41
3.	"Vision of Love"	Mariah Carey	3:31
4.	"Without You"	Music Box	3:34
5.	"Can't Let Go"	Emotions	4:27
6.	"Love Takes Time"	Mariah Carey	3:49
7.	"I'll Be There" (featuring Trey Lorenz)	MTV Unplugged	4:43
8.	"Thank God I Found You" (Make It Last Remix featuring Joe and Nas)	The Remixes	5:09
9.	"Endless Love" (featuring Luther Vandross)	Songs	4:18
10.	"I Still Believe"	#1's	3:54
11.	"My All"	Butterfly	3:50
12.	"The Roof (Back in Time)"	Butterfly	5:14
13.	"When You Believe" (with Whitney Houston)	#1's	4:31
14.	"Anytime You Need a Friend"	Music Box	4:26
15.	"Always Be My Baby"	Daydream	4:18
16.	"Dreamlover"	Music Box	3:53
17.	"How Much" (featuring Usher)	Rainbow	3:31
18.	"Reflections (Care Enough)"	Glitter	3:23
Total length:			72:11

American digital deluxe bonus tracks
No.	Title	Length
19.	"The Roof" (Mobb Deep Extended Version)	5:30
20.	"Always Be My Baby" (Mr. Dupri Mix featuring Da Brat and Xscape)	4:39
Total length:		82:20

European edition
No.	Title	Album	Length
1.	"Hero"		4:19
2.	"Vision of Love"		3:31
3.	"Without You"		3:34
4.	"Always Be My Baby"		4:18
5.	"My All"		3:50
6.	"How Much" (featuring Usher)		3:31
7.	"Dreamlover"		3:53
8.	"Thank God I Found You" (Make It Last Remix featuring Joe and Nas)		5:09
9.	"The Roof (Back in Time)"		5:14
10.	"One Sweet Day" (featuring Boyz II Men)		4:41
11.	"Anytime You Need a Friend"		4:26
12.	"I'll Be There" (featuring Trey Lorenz)		4:43
13.	"I Still Believe"		3:54
14.	"Reflections (Care Enough)"		3:23
15.	"Open Arms"	Daydream	3:30
16.	"Against All Odds (Take a Look at Me Now)" (featuring Westlife)	Coast to Coast	3:25
17.	"Endless Love" (featuring Luther Vandross)		4:18
18.	"All I Want for Christmas Is You" (not in certain European territories)	Merry Christmas	4:01
Total length:			70:20

International iTunes Store bonus tracks
No.	Title	Length
19.	"Anytime You Need a Friend" (Ministry of Sound Mix)	9:44
20.	"Always Be My Baby" (Always Club)	10:25
Total length:		90:29

Japan track listing
No.	Title	Album	Length
1.	"Hero"		4:19
2.	"One Sweet Day" (featuring Boyz II Men)		4:41
3.	"Endless Love" (featuring Luther Vandross)		4:18
4.	"Can't Take That Away (Mariah's Theme)"	Rainbow	4:32
5.	"Open Arms"		3:30
6.	"Reflections (Care Enough)"		3:23
7.	"Butterfly"	Butterfly	4:35
8.	"Love Takes Time"		3:49
9.	"My All"		3:50
10.	"Without You"		3:34
11.	"Always Be My Baby"		4:18
12.	"Vision of Love"		3:31
13.	"Can't Let Go"		4:27
14.	"Anytime You Need a Friend"		4:26
15.	"Thank God I Found You" (Make It Last Remix featuring Joe and Nas)		5:09
16.	"I'll Be There" (featuring Trey Lorenz)		4:43
17.	"I Still Believe"		3:54
18.	"Never Too Far"	Glitter	3:55
19.	"All I Want for Christmas Is You"		4:01
Total length:			75:35

== Charts ==
=== Weekly charts ===
Chart (2008–2011)	Peak position
Argentine Albums (CAPIF)	9
Australian Albums (ARIA)	79
Danish Albums (Hitlisten)	25
Dutch Albums (Album Top 100)	5
European Albums (Top 100)	42
French Compilations (SNEP)	39
Irish Albums (IRMA)	8
Italian Albums (FIMI)	56
Japanese Albums (Oricon)	19
New Zealand Albums (RMNZ)	19
Scottish Albums (Official Charts)	16
South Korean International Albums (Circle)	64
Swedish Albums (Sverigetopplistan)	22
Taiwanese Albums (Five Music)	1
UK Albums (Official Charts)	13
UK R&B Albums (Official Charts)	1
US Billboard 200	10
US Top R&B/Hip-Hop Albums (Billboard)	7

=== Year-end charts ===
Chart (2008)	Position
UK Albums (OCC)	126
Chart (2009)	Position
US Top R&B/Hip-Hop Albums (Billboard)	97

== Certifications and sales ==
Region	Certification	Certified units/sales
Ireland (IRMA)	Gold	7,500^{^}
United Kingdom (BPI)	Gold	100,000^{^}
United States	—	395,000
^{^} Shipments figures based on certification alone.

== Release history ==
- Various International – October 17, 2008
- South Korea and Argentina – October 21, 2008
- Hong Kong – October 22, 2008
- Germany – October 24, 2008; April 10, 2009
- Australia – November 3, 2008
- France – November 17, 2008
- Japan – November 26, 2008
- Canada – November 2008
- Brazil – December 2, 2008
- Taiwan – December 30, 2008
- Portugal – January 19, 2009
- US – January 20, 2009
- Spain – February 3, 2009
