= Never Too Far =

Single by Mariah Carey

from the album Glitter
- A-side: "Loverboy"
- Released: August 14, 2001
- Recorded: 2001
- Studio: Sheffield Audio Truck; El Cortijo (Marbella, Spain); TK Disc Studio (Hawaii); Flyte Tyme Studios (Edina, Minnesota)
- Genre: R&B; soul
- Length: 4:22; 3:56 (radio edit)
- Label: Virgin
- Composers: Mariah Carey; James Harris; Terry Lewis
- Lyricist: Mariah Carey
- Producers: Mariah Carey; Jimmy Jam; Terry Lewis

Mariah Carey singles chronology
"Loverboy" (2001)	"Never Too Far" (2001)	"Don't Stop (Funkin' 4 Jamaica)" (2001)

Music video
- "Never Too Far" on YouTube

"Never Too Far" is a song recorded by American singer-songwriter Mariah Carey for her first soundtrack and eighth studio album Glitter (2001). It was written and produced by herself and Jimmy Jam and Terry Lewis. The song was released as the album's second single on August 14, 2001, by Virgin Records. The song is a mid-tempo ballad which lyrically deals with heartbreak. "Never Too Far" was used on the charity single "Never Too Far/Hero Medley", which combines the first verse of the song with a re-recorded version of the first verse and bridge of Carey's previous single "Hero" (1993).

The single did not make much impact on the US charts; however, it did reach the top forty in the UK and Australia, as part of a double A-side with "Don't Stop (Funkin' 4 Jamaica)". A radio edit of "Never Too Far" was released and found as the opening track of the song's release. Carey was unable to film a music video for the single as she was recovering from a breakdown. Instead, a video was created using a scene taken directly from the film Glitter, where Billie Frank (played by Carey) sings the song at Madison Square Garden during a concert. Carey promoted "Never Too Far/Hero" medley through live performances at the 2001 Radio Music Awards, her A Home for the Holidays with Mariah Carey TV special, and "Never Too Far" during a Glitter medley 18 years later on her Caution World Tour.

== Background ==
In April 2001, Carey signed a US$100 million record deal with Virgin Records (EMI Records). Following commencement for Glitter — her first album under the new label — and the film of same name, Carey embarked on a short promotional campaign for the project. On July 19, 2001, Carey made a surprise appearance on the MTV program Total Request Live (TRL). She came out onto the filming stage, pushing an ice cream cart while wearing an oversized shirt. Seemingly anxious and exhilarated, Carey began giving out individual bars of ice cream to fans and guests on the program, while waving to the crowd down below on Times Square, while diverging into a rambling monologue regarding therapy. Carey then walked to Daly's platform and began a striptease, in which she shed her shirt to reveal a tight yellow and green ensemble, leading him to exclaim "Mariah Carey has lost her mind!".

Following other appearances on which her publicist Cindy Berger said the singer was "not thinking clearly", on July 26, she was hospitalized, citing "extreme exhaustion" and a "physical and emotional breakdown". Following her induction at an un-disclosed hospital in Connecticut, Carey remained hospitalized and under doctor's care for two weeks, followed by an extended absence from the album's promotion. However, her record company had begun promoting "Never Too Far" as the second single from the soundtrack, but Carey was not able to promote it due to still recovering from her breakdown. The song was sent to multiple radio formats in the United States on August 14, 2001.

== Usage in Glitter ==
In the film, Carey's character Billie Frank argues with her boyfriend and producer Dice (Max Beesley) and they break up. Her emotional pain leads her to solo songwriting. Dice also misses Billie, and also begins writing a song. Billie goes to Dice's apartment in an attempt to reconcile. He is not home, but the music he has written is and Billie realizes they wrote the same song: "Never Too Far". She kisses the sheet music, leaving a lipstick imprint, which Dice later discovers. Dice plans a reconciliation, but is killed by Billie's former producer Timothy Walker (Terrence Howard) after Dice did not pay the US$100,000 from their agreement to release Billie from Walker's contract. At Billie's first show at Madison Square Garden, her management and support crew see a report of the murder on television. They wonder if Billie was with him, they see that she is there and has seen the report. Billie onstage commands the band to stop playing "Loverboy", and urges the crowd never to take their loved ones for granted, and to tell them they love them before they lose the chance to tell them. She then starts to sing "Never Too Far" as a tribute to Dice.

== Composition ==
"Never Too Far"
A 26-second sample of "Never Too Far".

"Never Too Far" is a mid-tempo ballad. The song was written and produced by Carey and Jimmy Jam and Terry Lewis; it was released as the second single from her first soundtrack album, Glitter (2001). It incorporates music from several musical instruments, including the piano, guitar and organ. According to the sheet music published at Musicnotes.com by Alfred Music Publishing, the song is set in common time with a moderate tempo of 60 beats per minute. It is composed in the key of C major with Carey's vocal range spanning from the low-note of D♯_{3} to the high-note of A♭_{5}. The song's chorus has a basic chord progression of G_{sus2}–G–G/F♯–Em_{7}–G/D–C-G/B–Am_{7}. Described as an "adult-contemporary, slow-jam love song", the song's lyrics read "Too painful to talk about it, so I hold it in / So my heart can mend and be brave enough to love again", speaking of emotions felt by the protagonist in the film. "Never Too Far" features "a bed of synthesized strings, gentle drums and Spanish-style guitar" as its primary instrumentation, and incorporates violin and keyboard notes prior to the first verse. According to Chuck Taylor from Billboard, Carey sings the lyrics with "appreciable subtlety, gliding effortlessly" through the song. It ends with a 15-second note that would "evoke a satisfied sigh".

== Medley ==
Following the weak commercial success of Glitter, Carey's other label, Columbia Records, planned to release a compilation album of her biggest hits, titled Greatest Hits (2001). As they had one more album to release from Carey under her old contract, they began assembling content for its release. Though still signed to Virgin, Carey composed a charity single in which all proceeds would go towards helping rebuild America, following the terrorist attacks on September 11, 2001. Consequently, she re-recorded her 1993 song "Hero", and made a medley of it with "Never Too Far". The song features a different instrumental introduction, and begins with the first verse and chorus of "Never Too Far", and blends into the bridge of "Hero". Several writers for the medley are credited, with Carey having written "Never Too Far" with Jimmy Jam and Terry Lewis, and the latter with Walter Afanasieff. Aside from Jam and Lewis, Randy Jackson assisted Carey in the song's production. In an interview with MTV, Carey described the single and its conception:

I started doing different charity events where I did a combination of 'Never Too Far' and 'Hero'. We made it into a medley and put them in the same key and made it work. People responded really well to it. It's been interesting for me, since the events of September 11, the way people have been playing 'Hero' and really even talking to me about 'Never Too Far', 'cause that song is also about loss. I figured that it would be a nice thing to do, to put them both out for Christmas. There's also an unreleased track on the B-side, which is called 'There for Me' which kind of has the same sentiment. The proceeds from 'Never Too Far' and 'Hero' and 'There for Me' are going to go to the Heroes Fund, and it's going to benefit police officers' families, relief workers' families.

== Critical reception ==
"Never Too Far" received positive reviews from critics. Mark J. Marraccini from Albumism described it as "a classic Carey requiem full of big emotion". Billboard's Chuck Taylor called it a "shimmering ballad", that showcases the singer excelling at what made her a famous: "singing the hell out of a straight ahead love song free of gimmicks, gymnastics and self-conscious attempts at targeting any particular demographic"; he also said that "Never Too Far" would relieve fans that think Carey had been "relying more upon samples and guest vocalists lately than melody and artful performing". A writer from BET network included the track on their list of "Mariah Carey Singles That Deserved to Be No. 1 (But Didn't Get There)", calling it "an absolute stand out among a slew of songs draped in 80s garb". Can't Stop the Pop stated that it "remains a hugely underappreciated ballad", adding that this is "classic Mariah territory; a dramatic, sweeping that could comfortably segue into most of her signature ballads". James Salmon from Dotmusic felt that "there's not much you can really say. It's a slow number with all the vocal showboating you'd expect from her".

Kara Brown of Jezebel called it the album's strongest ballad. Harry Guerin from Raidió Teilifís Éireann wrote that "Never Too Far" showcased "her four octave range but sound[s] roughly like everything else she's committed to tape during her career". Sal Cinquemani of Slant Magazine called the song another "syrupy-sweet" ballad on the album and that it "harbors over-the-top performances worthy of "Star Search" (more than fitting considering the film's '80s-era rags-to-riches storyline)". Writing for Variety, Danielle Turchiano said it was the song that "transcended Carey’s catalogue and deserved to become an anthem". Turchiano said that the song's lyrics, which talk about a lost loved one, "held against the backdrop of Sept. 11" and transmitted the message "most needed to hear" at the time; "inspire[d] everyone [who had been through the trauma of the attacks] to look inward to find strength to push through". While reviewing the soundtrack on its 20th anniversary, Albumism's Mark J. Marraccini highlighted "Never Too Far" as a "classic Carey requiem full of big emotion" that "stuns in its simplicity".

== Chart performance ==
Due to the September 11 attacks, radio stations began playing "Never Too Far" before its official add date to rotation. However, it failed to enter the US Billboard Hot 100, peaking at number five on the Bubbling Under Hot 100 Singles. It also reached number 17 on the US Adult Contemporary component chart. Worldwide, "Never Too Far" was released as a double A-side with "Don't Stop (Funkin' 4 Jamaica)", and failed to reach the top-forty in most countries. In the United Kingdom, the release however reached a position of number 32. In contrast, "Never Too Far/Don't Stop (Funkin' 4 Jamaica)" reached numbers 67 and 65 in the Netherlands and Switzerland, respectively. It managed to reach peaks of numbers 36 and 16, in respective countries Australia and Spain. The double A-side single enjoyed moderate success in both the Flemish and Wallonian territories in Belgium, peaking at numbers 4 and 1 respectively on the equivalent of the "bubbling under" charts, registering songs just below the main charts. As a solo single, "Never Too Far" performed weakly in Germany reaching number 97 on the German Singles Chart, while in Sweden it peaked at number 56.

== Music video and live performances ==
Carey was unable to film an accompanying music video for the single; at the time of its release, she was recovering from a physical and emotional breakdown that left her hospitalized in August 2001, and caused her to cancel all public appearances to promote Glitter. She said, "When I was asked about the video I said, 'I can't do it today'. And nobody could accept that answer. And that's when I started to get mad. I was, like, look, I am too fatigued. I'm overly-tired, I can't do it as a human being. And nobody was hearing those last two words — human being. They were used to the Mariah that always says, 'Come on, let's fight, let's go'. They just weren't used to me ever saying no. I never said no before". Instead, a video was created using a scene taken directly from the film, where Billie Frank (played by Carey) sings the song at Madison Square Garden during her first sold-out concert. Frank's performance of the song in the film omits its entire second verse, and the song's development runs in parallel with the film's love story.

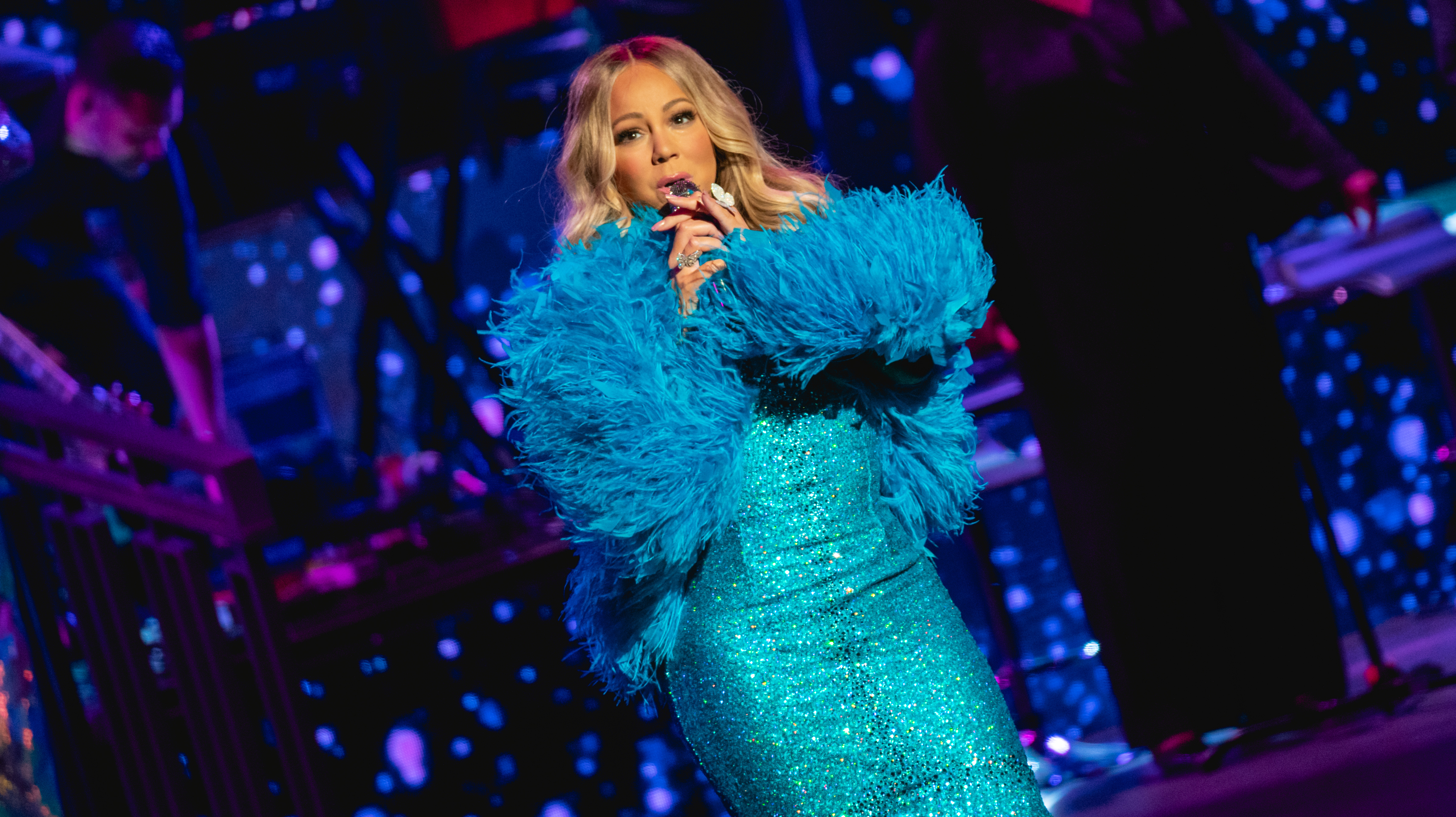
Carey performing "Never Too Far" as part of the #JusticeForGlitter medley of her Caution World Tour (2019)

Though having not promoted "Never Too Far" during the time of its release, Carey embarked on a short promotional campaign for "Never Too Far/Hero" medley, as well as charity benefits for the September 11 attacks victims. At the 2001 Radio Music Awards, Carey made her second public appearance following her breakdown, the first being a performance of "Hero" at the America: A Tribute to Heroes telethon on September 21, 2001. Entering the stage in a long black evening gown, Carey performed the medley live, followed by a standing ovation from the audience. On October 21, 2001, a benefit titled United We Stand: What More Can I Give was held at Robert F. Kennedy Memorial Stadium in Washington, D.C., accompanied by the charity single "What More Can I Give", in which Carey participated. Carey donned a black open-back dress with a plunging neckline, and performed "Never Too Far/Hero", followed by a live rendition of "What More Can I Give".

On November 16, 2001, Carey taped a special titled A Home for the Holidays with Mariah Carey, which aired on CBS on December 21 of that same year. The special featured additional performances by Destiny's Child, Josh Groban, Enrique Iglesias and Mandy Moore. Carey opened the special, with a performance of "Never Too Far/Hero" while wearing a form-fitting red evening gown. Aside from the medley, Carey performed "I'll Be There" and "Reflections (Care Enough)", also a single from Glitter. 18 years later, Carey included "Never Too Far" as part of the #JusticeForGlitter medley on her Caution World Tour.

On November 13, 2026, celebrating the album's 25th anniversary, Mariah Carey released the official version of the music video on YouTube.

== Formats and track listings ==
Benelux 2-track CD single

1. "Never Too Far" (Edit) - 3:56
2. "Don't Stop (Funkin' 4 Jamaica)" (featuring Mystikal) - 3:37

Australian, European and Malaysian CD maxi-single

1. "Never Too Far" (Edit) - 3:56
2. "Don't Stop (Funkin' 4 Jamaica)" (featuring Mystikal) - 3:37
3. "Loverboy" (Drums of Love) - 6:36
4. "Never Too Far" (Video) - 2:56

European cassette single

1. "Never Too Far" (Edit) - 3:56
2. "Don't Stop (Funkin' 4 Jamaica)" (featuring Mystikal) - 3:37
3. "Loverboy" (MJ Cole London Dub Mix) - 6:04

European 12-inch vinyl single

1. "Don't Stop (Funkin' 4 Jamaica)" (featuring Mystikal) - 3:37
2. "Don't Stop (Funkin' 4 Jamaica)" (featuring Mystikal) (Instrumental) - 3:37
3. "Never Too Far" - 4:22

== Credits and personnel ==
Credits for Glitter adapted from the album's liner notes.

- Mariah Carey – songwriting, producer, vocals, background vocals
- James Harris III – songwriting, producer
- Terry Lewis – songwriting, producer
- Lee Blaske – string arrangements
- Kuy-Young Kim – violin
- Leslie Shank – violin
- John Kennedy – violin
- Brenda Mickens – violin
- Carolyn Gunkler – violin
- Michal Sobieski – violin
- David Mickens – violin
- Alice Preves – viola
- Tamas Stresser – viola
- Sarah Lewis – cello
- Pitnary Chin – cello
- Gutav Highstein – English horn
- Xavier Smith – Pro-Tools, assistant
- Dana Jon Chappelle – engineer
- Steve Hodge – mixing
- Patrick Webber – assistant
- Troy Gonzales – assistant

== Charts ==
Weekly chart performance of "Never Too Far"
Chart (2001)	Peak position
Australia (ARIA) with "Don't Stop (Funkin' 4 Jamaica)"	36
Belgium (Ultratip Bubbling Under Flanders) with "Don't Stop (Funkin' 4 Jamaica)"	4
Belgium (Ultratip Bubbling Under Wallonia) with "Don't Stop (Funkin' 4 Jamaica)"	1
Croatia International Airplay (HRT)	3
Germany (Official German Charts)	97
Italy (FIMI) with "Don't Stop (Funkin' 4 Jamaica)"	22
Italy Airplay (Music & Media)	17
Netherlands (Dutch Top 40 Tipparade)	11
Netherlands (Single Top 100) with "Don't Stop (Funkin' 4 Jamaica)"	67
Scottish Singles Sales (Official Charts) with "Don't Stop (Funkin' 4 Jamaica)"	40
Spain (PROMUSICAE) with "Don't Stop (Funkin' 4 Jamaica)"	16
Sweden (Sverigetopplistan)	56
Switzerland (Schweizer Hitparade) with "Don't Stop (Funkin' 4 Jamaica)"	65
UK Singles (Official Charts) with "Don't Stop (Funkin' 4 Jamaica)"	32
UK Dance (Official Charts) with "Don't Stop (Funkin' 4 Jamaica)"	14
UK Hip Hop/R&B (Official Charts) with "Don't Stop (Funkin' 4 Jamaica)"	6
US Bubbling Under Hot 100 (Billboard)	5
US Adult Contemporary (Billboard)	17
US Adult Contemporary (Radio & Records)	15
US Adult R&B Songs (Billboard)	18
US CHR/Pop (Radio & Records)	47
US Urban AC (Radio & Records)	19

Year-end chart performance of "Never Too Far"
Chart (2001)	Peak position~
Brazil (Crowley)	59
US Adult Contemporary (Billboard)	41

== Release history ==
Release dates and formats for "Never Too Far"
Region	Date	Format(s)	Label(s)	Ref.
United States	August 14, 2001	Adult contemporary radio; contemporary hit radio; hot adult contemporary radio; rhythmic contemporary radio; urban adult contemporary radio	Virgin	
United States	August 20, 2001	Smooth jazz radio	Virgin	
Italy	September 24, 2001	Digital download	EMI	
United States	October 23, 2001	Maxi CD	Virgin	
Australia	November 5, 2001	Maxi CD	EMI	
United Kingdom	December 17, 2001	12-inch vinyl; cassette; maxi CD	Virgin	
