= Never Too Far/Hero Medley =

Single by Mariah Carey
- B-side: "There for Me"
- Released: December 11, 2001
- Recorded: 2001
- Studio: Record One (Los Angeles); Henson Recording Studios (Los Angeles); Westlake Recording Studios (Los Angeles)
- Genre: Pop; R&B
- Length: 4:48
- Label: Virgin
- Composers: Mariah Carey; Walter Afanasieff; James Harris; Terry Lewis
- Lyricist: Mariah Carey
- Producers: Mariah Carey; Jimmy Jam; Terry Lewis; Randy Jackson

Mariah Carey singles chronology
"Reflections (Care Enough)" (2001)	"Never Too Far/Hero Medley" (2001)	"Through the Rain" (2002)

Visualizer video
- "Never Too Far/Hero Medley" on YouTube

"Never Too Far/Hero Medley" is a medley recorded by American singer-songwriter Mariah Carey, released as a charity single on December 11, 2001 by Virgin Records in the US. It is also included as a bonus track in the Japanese release of Carey's Greatest Hits (2001). The medley combines the first verse and chorus of "Never Too Far", written by Carey and Jimmy Jam and Terry Lewis, with a re-recorded version of the first verse, chorus and bridge of "Hero", written by Carey and Walter Afanasieff. The song was produced by Carey, Jimmy Jam and Terry Lewis, and Randy Jackson. The single was meant to express a message of unity and love in the aftermath of the September 11 attacks.

Though Carey did not promote Glitter (2001), due to her hospitalization, she embarked on a short promotional tour for the single, and attended several charitable events. Carey performed the medley live at the 2001 Radio Music Awards, British music program Top of the Pops, the United We Stand: What More Can I Give concert benefit, and her own special titled, At Home For The Holidays With Mariah Carey. Following the single's release, the song managed to attain a peak position of number eighty-one on the Billboard Hot 100, in light of all of Carey's live appearances. Though promoted throughout Europe, the single was never given an official release outside the United States, therefore failing to chart in any other significant global music market. This would be Carey's last single with Virgin.

== Background and recording ==
Following the weak commercial success of Glitter (2001), her debut release under Virgin Records, Carey suffered an emotional and physical breakdown, followed by an extended hospitalization. Carey composed a charity single in which all proceeds would go towards helping rebuild America, following the terrorist attacks. Consequently, she re-recorded her 1993 song "Hero", and made a medley of it with a single from Glitter, "Never Too Far". The song features a different instrumental introduction, and begins with the first verse and chorus of "Never Too Far", and blends into the bridge of "Hero". Carey had co-written "Never Too Far" with Jimmy Jam and Terry Lewis, and "Hero" with Walter Afanasieff, thus all four writers are credited for the medley. Soon-to-be American Idol judge Randy Jackson assisted Carey, Jam, and Lewis in the song's production. In an interview with MTV, Carey described the single and its conception:

"I started doing different charity events where I did a combination of 'Never Too Far' and 'Hero'. We made it into a medley and put them in the same key and made it work. People responded really well to it. It's been interesting for me, since the events of September 11, the way people have been playing 'Hero' and really even talking to me about 'Never Too Far', 'cause that song is also about loss. I figured that it would be a nice thing to do, to put them both out for Christmas. There's also an unreleased track on the B-side, which is called 'There for Me' which kind of has the same sentiment. The proceeds from 'Never Too Far' and 'Hero' and 'There for Me' are going to go to the Heroes Fund, and it's going to benefit police officers' families, relief workers' families."

=== "There For Me" ===
The song's B-side, titled "There For Me", was a leftover track from Carey's Rainbow (1999), which she wrote alongside David Foster and Diane Warren. After Carey abandoned work with longtime collaborator Walter Afanasieff, she began working with Foster throughout Rainbow. During their many creative meetings, Foster introduced Carey to Warren, a songwriter with whom he had collaborated several times in the past. Throughout the process of writing and producing the song, the female pair did not work well with each other, as Carey accused Warren of repeating lyrical phrases too often, while Warren did not agree with some of Carey's production choices. After they completed the song, Carey wrote two other ballads with Warren for Rainbow, entitled "After Tonight" and "Can't Take That Away (Mariah's Theme)". In 2024, the song was included on the 25th anniversary edition of Rainbow.

== Composition ==
"Never Too Far/Hero"
A sample of "Never Too Far/Hero", featuring the bridge where both songs are conjoined into one ballad.

"Never Too Far/Hero" is a mid-tempo ballad, drawing influence from pop and R&B music genres. The song was written and produced by Carey and Walter Afanasieff, Jimmy Jam and Terry Lewis and Randy Jackson. It incorporates music from several musical instruments, including the piano, guitar and organ. According to the sheet music published at Musicnotes.com by Alfred Music Publishing, the song is set in common time with a moderate tempo of 62 beats per minute. It is composed in the key of C major with Carey's vocal range spanning from the low-note of D_{3} to the high-note of A_{6}. The song's chorus has a basic chord progression of G_{sus2}–G–G/F♯–Em_{7}–G/D–C-G/B–Am_{7}.

While "Hero" describes the hidden power inside each individual, "Never Too Far" encourages those who are doubtful over their very existence, and how through perseverance, one can see that nothing is ever 'too far away'. With both songs combined, the single gives over a supportive message, for those who are either looking for meaning in life, or just doubting their own worth and ability. During a show on Carey's The Adventures of Mimi Tour, she described the meaning "Hero" had to her and her fans:

"I wrote a song a while back even before 'One Sweet Day' and it was not my favorite song in the world, but I wrote it. Someone asked me to write a song and they told me the story, and you know it was kind of a moving concept or whatever.

And I did it, and I was like you know it's not necessarily what I like per se, but after doing the song over and over again, and having people coming up to and saying, 'Thank you for writing 'Hero' because it saved my life or it saved my father's life, or my brother's, or sister's life,' or something of that nature, I said I always have to sing that song when I'm performing, because if I don't, you never know who I'm leaving out.

And you know what, in times of my life I've had to turn to that song lyrically, and flip it onto my own life and sing it to myself. So it's from the Music Box album, and it's called 'Hero', this is for you."

== Reception ==
Elysa Gardner from USA Today called "Never Too Far/Hero" a "refreshing medley" and felt it would easily be accepted among Carey's other popular and heartfelt inspirational ballads. The medley was only given a commercial release in the United States. Though "Hero" (a single from Carey's album Music Box) had gone to number-one on the US Billboard Hot 100, "Never Too Far" (a single from Glitter) had failed to chart. "Never Too Far/Hero Medley" performed marginally better, peaking at number eighty-one and remaining on the chart for three weeks, however still not delivering the kind of success Carey was accustomed to prior to Glitter. The charity single was released to help victims of the September 11 attacks, with all proceeds from the sales of the single going towards the Heroes Fund, a charity benefit for victims of the attacks and their families, police officers, and relief workers.

== Live performances ==
Though having not promoted Glitter during the time of its release, due to her breakdown and subsequent hospitalization, Carey embarked on a short promotional campaign for the single, as well as charity benefits for the September 11 attacks victims. At the 2001 Radio Music Awards, Carey made her second public appearance following her breakdown, the first being a performance of "Hero" at the America: A Tribute to Heroes telethon on September 21, 2001. Entering the stage in a long black evening gown, Carey performed the medley live, followed by a standing ovation from the audience. On October 21, 2001, a benefit titled United We Stand: What More Can I Give was held at Robert F. Kennedy Memorial Stadium in Washington, D.C., accompanied by the charity single "What More Can I Give", in which Carey participated. Carey donned a black open-back dress with a plunging neckline, and performed "Never Too Far/Hero", followed by a live rendition of "What More Can I Give".

On November 16, 2001, Carey taped a special titled A Home For The Holidays With Mariah Carey, which aired on December 21 of that same year. The special featured additional performances by Destiny's Child, Josh Groban, Enrique Iglesias and Mandy Moore. Carey opened the special, with a performance of "Never Too Far/Hero" while wearing a form-fitting red evening gown. Aside from the single, Carey performed "I'll Be There" and "Reflections (Care Enough)", a single from Glitter. Following stateside promotion of the charity single, Carey performed it alongside Westlife on the British music chart program, Top of the Pops.

== Format and track listing ==
US 2-track CD single

1. "Never Too Far / Hero Medley" - 4:48
2. "There for Me" - 4:15

== Credits and personnel ==
- Mariah Carey – co-production, songwriting, vocals
- Walter Afanasieff – songwriting
- James Harris – songwriting, co-production
- Terry Lewis – songwriting, co-production
- Randy Jackson – co-production

Credits adapted from the Greatest Hits liner notes.

== Charts ==
Chart (2001)	Peak position
US Billboard Hot 100	81
US Hot R&B/Hip-Hop Songs (Billboard)	66

== Release history ==
Release dates and formats for "Never Too Far/Hero Medley"
Region	Date	Format(s)	Label(s)	Ref.
United States	December 11, 2001	CD	Virgin	

== See also ==
- Financial assistance following the September 11 attacks

== Bibliography ==
- Nickson, Chris (1998), Mariah Carey revisited: her story, St. Martin's Press, ISBN 978-0-312-19512-0
- Shapiro, Marc (2001), Mariah Carey: The Unauthorized Biography, ECW Press, ISBN 978-1-55022-444-3
