= Funkin' for Jamaica =

Funkin' 4 Jamaica may refer to:

- "Funkin' for Jamaica (N.Y.)", a 1980 single by jazz trumpeter Tom Browne.
- "Don't Stop (Funkin' 4 Jamaica)", a 2001 single by Mariah Carey
