= When Boys Talk =

- (German Single Cover)

Single by Indeep

from the album Last Night A DJ Saved My Life
- Released: 1983
- Genre: Synth-funk; funk; R&B
- Length: 3:55
- Label: Sound Of New York
- Producer(s): Mike Cleveland; Reggie Thompson

Indeep singles chronology
"Last Night a D.J. Saved My Life" (1983)	"When Boys Talk" (1983)

"When Boys Talk" is a song by funk/R&B duo Indeep released as a single from their debut album, Last Night a DJ Saved My Life. The song peaked at No. 32 on the US Billboard Hot Black Singles chart and No. 16 on the US Billboard Dance Club Songs chart.

== Critical reception ==
Alex Henderson of AllMusic, in his review of the parent album, commented "the pointed yet amusing 'When Boys Talk'...was also a hit and has a good laugh at the expense of men who brag about their sexual conquests."

== Charts ==
Chart (1983)	Peak position
US Hot Black Singles (Billboard)	26
US Hot Dance Club Play (Billboard)	36
Belgium (Ultratop)	32
Germany (GfK Entertainment charts)	31
UK Singles Chart (OCC)	67
