= Michael Jackson: Live at the Apollo 2002 =

2002 concert by Michael Jackson

- Concert by Michael Jackson
- Location: New York City, United States
- Venue: Apollo Theater
- Date: April 24, 2002
- Box office: approx. $3 million

Michael Jackson concert chronology
- United We Stand: What More Can I Give (2001); Michael Jackson: Live at the Apollo (2002); This Is It (2009–2010)

Michael Jackson: Live at the Apollo was a concert by American singer Michael Jackson. The concert was performed at the Apollo Theater in New York City on April 24, 2002. The concert was a fundraiser for the Democratic National Committee and former President Bill Clinton. The money collected would be used to encourage citizens to vote. It raised almost $3 million. Dave Navarro played guitar during the song "Black or White". This was Michael Jackson's final on-stage performance.

== Set list ==
1. "Dangerous"
2. "Black or White"
3. "Stranger in Moscow" (instrumental interlude, rehearsal only)
4. "We Are the World" (instrumental interlude)
5. "Heal the World"

== Availability ==
Jackson's performance at the event has remained unavailable in its entirety. A sole video clip of "Dangerous" was officially published by C-SPAN, acknowledging that copyright issues prohibit any further releases. Other clips from the rehearsals for "Heal the World" and "Black or White" leaked in subsequent years. The latter features Dave Navarro from Jane's Addiction and Jackson's friend and choreographer, LaVelle Smith Jr.
