= Indeep =

American musical group

- Origin: New York City, U.S.
- Genres: funk, post-disco, Electro
- Years active: 1980–1987
- Label: Sound of New York
- Past members: Michael Cleveland; Réjane Magloire; Rose Marie Ramsey

Indeep was an American band from New York active in the 1980s, best known for their 1982 song "Last Night a D.J. Saved My Life".

== Career ==
The group was led by its musician and singer-songwriter Michael Cleveland, and it was known for employing a strong disco-like bassline and early hip hop lyrics backed by two female singers: Réjane Magloire and Rose Marie Ramsey.

"Last Night a D.J. Saved My Life" was released on Sound of New York/Becket Records in 1982 and peaked in early 1983, reaching the top 10 on the US R&B and No. 2 on the US Club charts as well as the Top 3 in the Dutch Top 40 and the Top 15 in the UK, and was certified for gold-level sales in France. The 12" mix was notable at the time for including a purely vocal mix (a capella), an instrumental mix, plus a track of sound effects contained in the song such as a toilet flushing and a phone ringing. The aim was to encourage mixing in the emerging New York DJ scene of the early 1980s and elsewhere.

The follow-up single, "When Boys Talk", did not achieve the same level of success on either side of the Atlantic, which, combined with its limited later success, put the group into the one-hit wonders category. Vocalist Magloire later enjoyed some success with the Belgian house-techno outfit Technotronic. "Last Night a DJ Saved My Life" was later covered by Mariah Carey on her 2001 album Glitter, which reached No. 25 in Spain.

In the 1990s, Michael Cleveland did not perform as Indeep besides a 1997 New Year's show on French television network TF1.

In 2011, Peter A. Mercury, who published, managed, produced, and toured with many top artists for many years, convinced Cleveland to reform the band. Magloire and Ramsey were replaced by Beckie Bell and WiX.

Magloire died in October 2023.

== Discography ==
=== Studio albums ===
Year	Album	US R&B	GER
1983	Last Night a D.J. Saved My Life!	43	36
1984	Pajama Party Time	—	—
"—" denotes releases that did not chart.

=== Compilation albums ===
Year	Album	US R&B
1991	The Collection	—
"—" denotes releases that did not chart.

=== Singles ===
Year	Single	Peak chart positions						Certifications	Album
Year	Single	US Club	US R&B	BEL (FL)	GER	NLD	UK	Certifications	Album
1982	"Last Night a D.J. Saved My Life"	2	10	2	10	2	13	BPI: Silver	Last Night a D.J. Saved My Life!
1983	"When Boys Talk"	16	32	32	31	―	67		Last Night a D.J. Saved My Life!
1983	"Buffalo Bill"	—	81	32	—	—	―		Last Night a D.J. Saved My Life!
1983	"The Record Keeps Spinning"	32	45	—	—	—	―		Pajama Party Time
1984	"The Rapper"	—	—	—	—	—	―		Non-album single
1984	"The Night the Boy Learned How to Dance"	—	—	—	—	—	―		Pajama Party Time
"—" denotes releases that did not chart or were not released in that territory.
