= United We Stand: What More Can I Give =

Benefit concert by Michael Jackson

- Benefit concert by Michael Jackson
- Location: Washington, D.C., United States
- Venue: Robert F. Kennedy Memorial Stadium
- Date: October 21, 2001
- Producers: Clear Channel Entertainment

Michael Jackson concert chronology
- Michael Jackson: 30th Anniversary Celebration (2001); United We Stand: What More Can I Give (2001); Michael Jackson: Live at the Apollo 2002 (2002)

United We Stand: What More Can I Give was a benefit concert led by American singer Michael Jackson held on October 21, 2001, at the Robert F. Kennedy Memorial Stadium in Washington, D.C. The concert was the third major concert held in tribute to the victims of the September 11 attacks. The other two were held in New York City. The special premiered on ABC on Thursday, November 1, 2001.

== Performances ==
The concert was a half-day-long spectacle beginning in the early afternoon and lasting well into the night. Performers ranged from music icons including Mariah Carey, James Brown, Al Green, Carole King, Rod Stewart, Bette Midler, America, and Huey Lewis to newer stars of that time including Destiny's Child, P. Diddy, the Goo Goo Dolls, Train, Backstreet Boys, Usher, Pink, and NSYNC. Each performer did a brief set usually amounting to about five songs apiece.

In order, the performances were: Backstreet Boys, Krystal Harris, Huey Lewis and the News, James Brown, Billy Gilman, O-Town, Usher, Christina Milian, Carole King, Al Green, Pink, Bette Midler, CeCe Peniston, Aerosmith, America, P. Diddy with Faith Evans, NSYNC, Janet Jackson, Destiny's Child, Rod Stewart, Goo Goo Dolls, Train, Mariah Carey, Britney Spears, and Michael Jackson, who performed "Man in the Mirror". Then everyone joined, including MC Hammer and Mýa, for closing the show by performing "What More Can I Give".

Notable appearances were given by Aerosmith, who performed at the festival as well as a scheduled concert in Indianapolis on the same night, while Backstreet Boys, Destiny's Child, and the Goo Goo Dolls had performed the previous night at the Concert for New York City.

== Issues ==
The event was plagued with problems, such as guests that did not show up (including Mick Jagger, Kiss, Ricky Martin, Aaron Carter and MC Hammer), faulty sound equipment, and concessionaires running out of food and beverages.

== Television broadcast ==
Several days after the event, ABC aired a condensed, two-hour version of the concert as a television special. Due to an exclusivity agreement with CBS for an upcoming special drawn from the 30th anniversary concerts, Jackson's solo performance of "Man in the Mirror" was removed from the ABC broadcast at the request of his management. The finale which incorporated Jackson was still allowed to air.

== Host and special appearances ==
John Stamos hosted the event, and appearances were also made by celebrities including Kevin Spacey along with political figures such as the mayor of Washington, D.C.

== Set list ==
- Backstreet Boys
  1. "The Star-Spangled Banner" (broadcast on ABC)
  2. "Everyone"
  3. "I Want It That Way"
  4. "More than That"
  5. "The Answer to Our Life"
  6. "Shape of My Heart" (broadcast on ABC)
  7. "Drowning"
- Krystal Harris
  1. "Supergirl"
- Huey Lewis and the News
  1. "The Heart of Rock & Roll"
  2. "Perfect World"
  3. "The Power of Love"
  4. "Workin' for a Livin'"
- James Brown
  1. "Living in America"
  2. "The Popcorn/School Is In"
  3. "I Feel Good"
  4. "Sex Machine"
  5. "God Bless America"
- Billy Gilman
  1. "One Voice"
- O-Town
  1. "All Or Nothing"
- Usher
  1. "U Remind Me"
- Christina Milian
  1. "AM to PM"
- Carole King
  1. "So Far Away"
  2. "Love Makes the World"
  3. "Monday Without You"
- Al Green
  1. "Let's Stay Together"
  2. "Amazing Grace/Together (reprise)"
  3. "Take Me to the River"
- Pink
  1. "My Vietnam"
  2. "Me and Bobby McGee"
- Bette Midler
  1. "From a Distance"
  2. "Boogie Woogie Bugle Boy"
  3. "The Rose"
- CeCe Peniston
  1. "Finally"
- Aerosmith
  1. "Livin' on the Edge" (broadcast on ABC)
  2. "I Don't Want to Miss a Thing" (broadcast on ABC)
  3. "Just Push Play" (broadcast on ABC)
  4. "Walk This Way" (broadcast on ABC)
- America
  1. "Ventura Highway"
  2. "Sister Golden Hair"
- P. Diddy
  1. "Bad Boy for Life"
  2. "Been Around the World"
  3. "It's All About the Benjamins"
  4. "Come with Me" (broadcast on ABC)
  5. "Mo Money Mo Problems"
  6. "I'll Be Missing You" (broadcast on ABC)
- *NSYNC
  1. "Pop"
  2. "Tearin' Up My Heart"
  3. "This I Promise You"
  4. "Bye Bye Bye"
- Janet Jackson
  1. "All for You" (broadcast on ABC)
- Destiny's Child
  1. "Survivor" (broadcast on ABC)
  2. "Emotion" (broadcast on ABC)
  3. "Gospel Medley"
- Rod Stewart
  1. "Hot Legs" (broadcast on ABC)
  2. "Forever Young" (broadcast on ABC)
  3. "Rhythm of My Heart" (broadcast on ABC)
- Goo Goo Dolls
  1. "Slide"
  2. "Iris" (broadcast on ABC)
  3. "American Girl" (broadcast on ABC)
- Train
  1. "Meet Virginia"
  2. "Drops of Jupiter" (broadcast on ABC)
- Mariah Carey
  1. "Never Too Far/Hero" (broadcast on ABC)
  2. "Last Night a DJ Saved My Life" (broadcast on ABC)
- Michael Jackson
  1. "Man in the Mirror"
  2. "What More Can I Give" (broadcast on ABC)

== See also ==
- America: A Tribute to Heroes
- The Concert for New York City
