= Reflections (Care Enough) =

Single by Mariah Carey

from the album Glitter
- Released: September 27, 2001
- Studio: Sheffield Audio Truck; El Cortijo (Marbella, Spain); Flyte Tyme Studios (Edina, Minnesota)
- Genre: Pop; R&B
- Length: 3:23
- Label: Virgin
- Composers: Mariah Carey; Philippe Pierre
- Lyricist: Mariah Carey
- Producers: Mariah Carey; Jimmy Jam and Terry Lewis

Mariah Carey singles chronology
"Don't Stop (Funkin' 4 Jamaica)" (2001)	"Reflections (Care Enough)" (2001)	"Never Too Far/Hero Medley" (2001)

Audio sample
- 19-second sample of "Reflections (Care Enough)": file; help

Visualizer video
- "Reflections (Care Enough)" on YouTube

"Reflections (Care Enough)" is a song recorded by American singer-songwriter Mariah Carey for her first soundtrack and eighth studio album Glitter (2001). It was written by herself and Philippe Pierre, while produced by the singer in collaboration with Jimmy Jam and Terry Lewis. The ballad has Carey, in character as Billie Frank in the film Glitter, reflecting on how her mother did not "care enough" for her. "Reflections (Care Enough)" was released as the fourth single from Glitter exclusively in Japan on September 27, 2001 and failed to chart. The song was also featured on Carey's compilation album The Ballads (2008).

== Background ==
"Reflections (Care Enough)" was released as the album's second single on September 27, 2001 in Japan. Because of contractual obligations, Sony Music Entertainment, Carey's then-former record label and the international distributor of the Glitter soundtrack, released a CD single for the song in Japan only.

In an interview with Much Music, Carey talked about the song: "Certain songs from this movie were written to enhance the scene like through Billie's point of view, like there's a song - I always call "Care Enough", but everyone's calling it "Reflection" because that's the first line I sing in the song. And she's sort of asking the question "did you ever really care about me?" to her mom cause she starts, like, thinking about it as we see her, you know, evolve in the movie. And so there are lines in the song like "if I'm not quite good enough or somehow undeserving of a mother's love". That would never have come out of my mouth 'cause my momma loves me! But, you know, there's a different approach in writing these songs".

== Composition ==
"Reflections (Care Enough)" was written by Carey and Philippe Pierre, and produced by Jimmy Jam and Terry Lewis in collaboration with Carey. It is written in the key of G major and set in common time. The vocal range spans from the low note A_{3} to the high note of E_{5}. It is a piano-driven song which lyrically, the song's protagonist "laments the end of a relationship", while confronting her mother regarding her early abandonment. Additionally, during its bridge, Carey "eerily" refers to abortion, "You could have had the decency / To give me up / Before you gave me life", as an option over abandoning the child. Larry Flick from Billboard commented that in the film, the song "manages to illustrate a crucial plot point, while also providing insight into the emotional baggage that Carey's film alter ego carries".

== Critical reception ==
Billboard's Larry Flick thought that the song was "quite powerful". Bowling Green Daily News editor Chuck Campbell wrote that Mariah dishes out the "anonymous and unobjectionable ballad". David Browne of Entertainment Weekly wrote a mixed review: "She laments the end of a relationship several times, most believably on Reflections (Care Enough) -- typical Ma-riah schlock sung with crushed-flower loneliness". Slant Magazine's Sal Cinquemani disagreed: "Reflections (Care Enough)" tells the tale of an estranged mother figure and its sparse arrangement recalls the simple beauty of Carey's early balladry. The song's bridge is bizarre, though". In a review for the album in The Free Lance–Star, a writer outed the song's first verse "A displeased little girl / Wept years in silence / And whispers wishes you'd materialize / She pressed on night and day / To keep on living / And tried so many ways / To keep her soul alive" as his favorite lyric from Glitter, and described it as an "emotional and heart-wrenching ballad".

== Live performance ==
On November 16, 2001, Carey sang the song on a special titled A Home For The Holidays With Mariah Carey, which aired on December 21 of that same year on Columbia Broadcasting System (CBS). The special featured additional performances by Destiny's Child, Josh Groban, Enrique Iglesias and Mandy Moore. In the live performance, Carey sang a different lyric in the bridge. While the track sings "you could have had the decency to give me up before you gave me life", Carey sings "...give me up the day you gave me life" in order to avoid referencing abortion. Mark Sachs from Los Angeles Times called the performance as a "high point" from the show.

== Format and track listing ==
- Japanese 2-track CD single
1. "Reflections (Care Enough)" – 3:23
2. "Reflections (Care Enough)" (Instrumental) – 3:24

== Release history ==
Release dates and formats for "Reflections (Care Enough)"
Region	Date	Format(s)	Label(s)	Ref.
Japan	September 27, 2001	CD	Sony Music	
