= Greatest Hits (Mariah Carey album) =

2001 greatest hits album by Mariah Carey

Greatest hits album by Mariah Carey
- Released: December 4, 2001
- Recorded: 1988–2000
- Genres: R&B; pop
- Length: 122:23
- Label: Columbia
- Producers: Mariah Carey; Babyface; Dave Hall; David Cole; DJ Clue; Jermaine Dupri; Jimmy Jam and Terry Lewis; Ken "Duro" Ifill; Mike Mason; Narada Michael Walden; Rhett Lawrence; Ric Wake; Robert Clivillés; Sean "Puffy" Combs; Steve Mac; Stevie J; The Ummah; Walter Afanasieff

Mariah Carey chronology
Glitter (2001)	Greatest Hits (2001)	Charmbracelet (2002)

The Essential Mariah Carey
- US edition artwork

Greatest Hits is the first greatest hits album by American singer-songwriter Mariah Carey, released by Columbia Records on December 4, 2001. Issued after Carey's departure from Columbia, the album spans her tenure with the label and includes most of her singles released between 1990 and 2000. It features her then fifteen US number-one singles, as well as the UK number-one hits "Without You" and "Against All Odds".

Following criticism from reviewers and Carey herself of her first compilation album, #1's (1998), which focused on her US number-one singles, Greatest Hits was developed as a double album with a broader selection of her work, including two number-one songs released after #1's. The album peaked at number 52 on the US Billboard 200 and number seven on the UK Albums Chart. It received platinum certifications in several countries, including double-platinum in the US and triple-platinum in the UK and Australia.

The album was reissued internationally as The Essential Mariah Carey on January 10, 2011, as part of Legacy Recordings' Essential series, with the same track listing. The US edition, released on April 24, 2012, included extended mixes and additional non-single tracks personally selected by Carey.

== Background and development ==
Greatest Hits was part of a four-album deal that completed Mariah Carey's contract with Columbia Records and allowed her to move to Virgin Records in 2001. The deal consisted of two compilation albums, #1's (1998) and Greatest Hits; the studio album Rainbow (1999); and the remix album The Remixes (2003). Carey's departure from Columbia followed strained working relationships with the label and her ex-husband, Sony Music CEO Tommy Mottola. Unlike #1's, Carey had little involvement in developing Greatest Hits. The album contains no personal messages in its liner notes, and Columbia conducted no significant promotional campaign for it. When asked about the album on its release day by Entertainment Tonight, Carey remarked: "Does it come out today? Oh, ha ha."

Critics faulted the selection of previously released material on #1's, which was limited to her then-thirteen US Billboard Hot 100 number-one singles. Carey was disappointed by the exclusion of several songs that she felt were her "best work", a view she expressed in the liner notes for #1's in an "open letter to [her] fans":

"First of all – this is not a greatest hits album! It's too soon, I haven't been recording long enough for that! This album is a 'thank you' and an acknowledgment of my gratitude to all of you out there for making these records #1 on the charts.

One day, I will put out a greatest hits with songs that didn't even go on the charts because they were never commercially released (i.e., 'Breakdown', (Note: Though not included in Greatest Hits, "Breakdown" was later included in The Remixes (2003).) 'Underneath the Stars', 'Butterfly', etc.) or songs that came out that didn't go to #1 that are, in my opinion, better than some that did (i.e., 'Make It Happen', 'Anytime You Need a Friend', 'Endless Love' with Luther, or 'Can't Let Go')."

By contrast, Carey was more positive about the track selection for Greatest Hits, describing the new inclusions as "songs that needed to be really heard". The album includes every track from #1's, except "Whenever You Call" and the international bonus track "Do You Know Where You're Going To (Theme from Mahogany)". The album additionally includes seven more songs released before #1's, and four songs released after #1's, including the US number-one hits "Heartbreaker" and "Thank God I Found You". "Without You" also appears in the album's standard track list, while it was only included as a bonus track in international releases of #1's.

Greatest Hits is the only Carey compilation to include the original version of "Fantasy". Her other compilations, including #1's, feature the Ol' Dirty Bastard remix, Carey's preferred version; she has described the remix as a "turning point" in her career. "Endless Love", a duet with Luther Vandross, was not previously included in a Carey album; the song reached top-ten in several countries, including number two in the US, and number three in the UK.

=== Bonus tracks ===
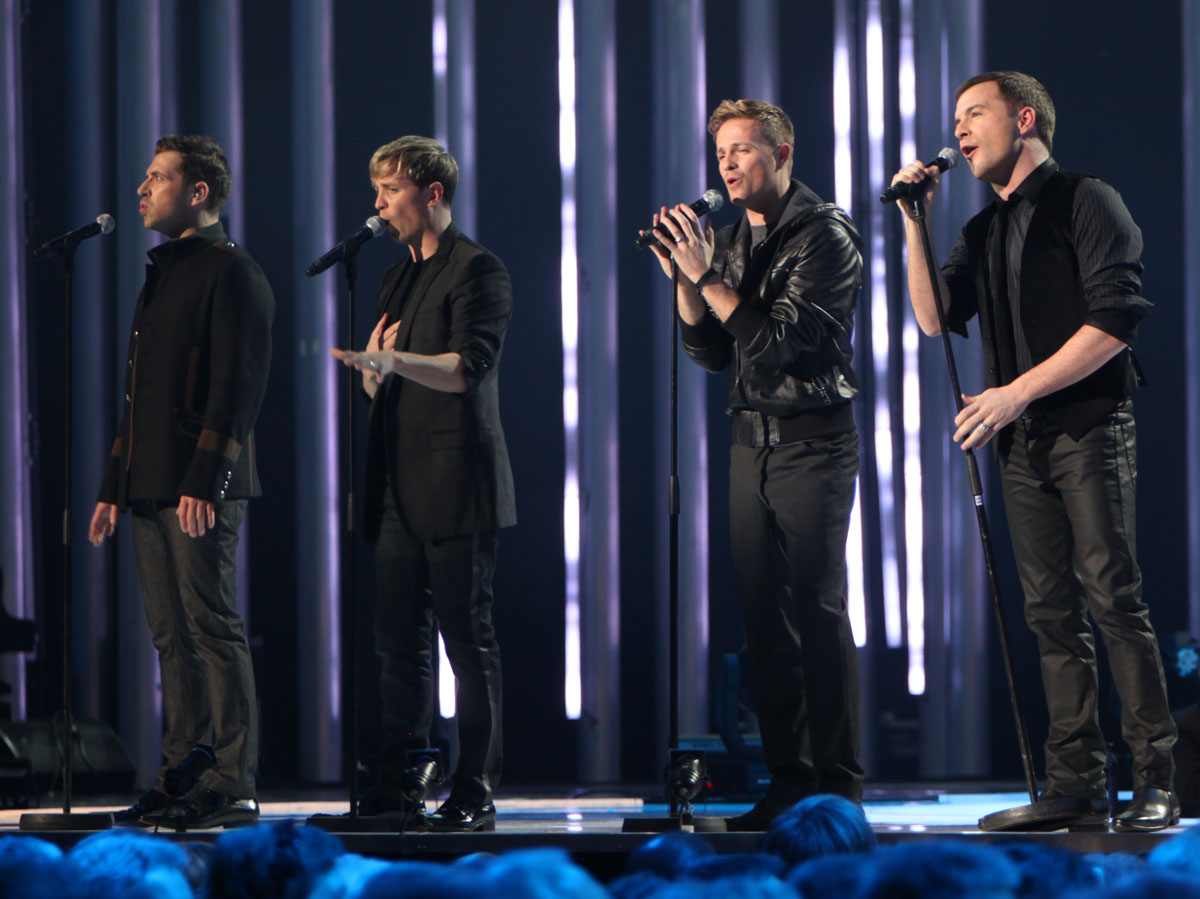
"Against All Odds" featuring Irish boy band Westlife (pictured), a UK and Irish number-one hit, is included in international editions of the album.

The So So Def remix of "All I Want for Christmas Is You" was first released on a Japanese reissue of the single in 2000 and features Lil' Bow Wow and frequent collaborator Jermaine Dupri. Carey initially covered Phil Collins' "Against All Odds (Take a Look at Me Now)" for Rainbow, and reworked it in 2000 as a duet with Irish boy band Westlife. The duet version topped both the UK and Irish Singles Charts and was subsequently included on international editions of the album. Released the following week, on December 12, the Japanese edition of the album adds four bonus tracks, including "Never Too Far/Hero Medley" and the original version of "All I Want for Christmas Is You". "Never Too Far/Hero Medley" was released on December 11 in the US as a charity single for the victims of the September 11 attacks, and was included because Sony Music Japan distributed Carey's Virgin releases in the country. "All I Want for Christmas Is You" is her best-selling physical single in the country, with 1.1 million copies sold.

Greatest Hits was re-released as The Essential Mariah Carey by Legacy Recordings internationally in January 2011, and in the US in April 2012. Carey contributed creative input to the track selection for the US edition, resulting in an altered track listing. In a press release, she stated: "I wanted to create a collection of some of my favorite songs, several of them are very big hits and some are more obscure favorites of mine as well as fan faves". The US edition includes four additional non-single tracks: "Vanishing" from Mariah Carey (1990), "Close My Eyes" and "The Roof" from Butterfly (1997), and "Bliss" from Rainbow. It also includes extended club remixes of "Emotions" and "Anytime You Need a Friend".

== Critical reception ==
Professional ratings
Review scores
Source	Rating
AllMusic	(Note: AllMusic also reviewed the international edition of The Essential Mariah Carey in 2011, which shares the same track listing. The rating was lowered to 4/5.)
Slant Magazine	3.5/5 stars

Greatest Hits generally received positive reviews from critics, who noted the timing of its release amid the personal and commercial troubles surrounding Carey's Glitter project, which was released in September 2001. Stephen Thomas Erlewine of AllMusic commended the "archival" nature of the album, but criticized its long runtime, recommending the "more concentrated" #1's instead. In an updated review in 2011, Erlewine described the album as a "good and thorough retrospective of Mariah in her prime".

Sal Cinquemani of Slant Magazine gave the album 3.5 out of 5 stars. He praised the inclusion of "Make It Happen", "Without You", and "Underneath the Stars", stating that they "have certainly earned their spots next to hits" such as "Hero" and "One Sweet Day", and called the album Carey's "first proper hits compilation". However, Cinquemani also negatively described the album as an attempt by Columbia and Carey's ex-husband to "cash in Carey's pre-borderline 'Columbia Years'". Devon Powers of PopMatters praised the album, writing that its chronological track order showcases Carey's artistic growth throughout her "remarkable" career, and described her as a "living legend". Powers also noted the inclusion of "Can't Take That Away (Mariah's Theme)", comparing the song's emphasis on resilience to Carey's personal and professional setbacks at the time. In a negative review, Sarah Liss of Now criticized the songs as "bland" and "hard to distinguish from each other".

== Commercial performance ==
Greatest Hits debuted at number 52 on the US Billboard 200, charted for 13 weeks, and remained her lowest-peaking album on the chart until 2020, when Mariah Carey's Magical Christmas Special charted at number 100. It debuted and initially peaked at number 46 on the UK Albums Chart for the week ending December 15, 2001, selling 18,000 copies, but later reached a new peak of number seven on the week ending October 29, 2005, following the success of her tenth studio album The Emancipation of Mimi. It spent a total of 38 weeks on the UK Albums Chart. The album also topped the UK Hip Hop and R&B Albums Chart for four non-consecutive weeks, becoming her seventh number-one album on the chart.

As of November 2018, Greatest Hits had sold 1.23 million copies in the US and had received a double-platinum certification by the Recording Industry Association of America (RIAA), representing 1 million double-disc units sold. (Note: Each disc is certified as an album by the RIAA for multi-disc albums over 100 minutes.) It also received certifications in several other countries, including triple-platinum certifications by the British Phonographic Industry (BPI) and Australian Recording Industry Association (ARIA), signifying over 900,000 copies sold in the UK and 210,000 copies sold in Australia, respectively. Greatest Hits had also sold 177,945 copies in South Korea as of 2002.

== Track listing ==
Disc 1
No.	Title	Writer(s)	Original album	Length
1.	"Vision of Love"	Mariah Carey; Ben Margulies	Mariah Carey (1990)	3:31
2.	"Love Takes Time"	Carey; Margulies	Mariah Carey	3:48
3.	"Someday"	Carey; Margulies	Mariah Carey	4:07
4.	"I Don't Wanna Cry"	Carey; Narada Michael Walden	Mariah Carey	4:49
5.	"Emotions"	Carey; David Cole; Robert Clivillés	Emotions (1991)	4:09
6.	"Can't Let Go"	Carey; Walter Afanasieff	Emotions	4:27
7.	"Make It Happen"	Carey; Cole; Clivillés	Emotions	5:08
8.	"I'll Be There" (featuring Trey Lorenz)	Berry Gordy; Bob West; Hal Davis; Willie Hutch	MTV Unplugged (1992)	4:24
9.	"Dreamlover"	Carey; Dave Hall; David Porter	Music Box (1993)	3:54
10.	"Hero"	Carey; Afanasieff	Music Box	4:18
11.	"Without You"	Pete Ham; Tom Evans	Music Box	3:34
12.	"Anytime You Need a Friend"	Carey; Afanasieff	Music Box	4:26
13.	"Endless Love" (with Luther Vandross)	Lionel Richie	Songs (1994)	4:20
14.	"Fantasy"	Carey; Chris Frantz; Tina Weymouth; Hall; Adrian Belew; Steven Stanley	Daydream (1995)	4:04
Total length:				58:55

Disc 1 – Japanese edition bonus tracks
No.	Title	Writer(s)	Original album	Length
15.	"Music Box"	Carey; Afanasieff	Music Box	4:57
16.	"All I Want for Christmas Is You"	Carey; Afanasieff	Merry Christmas (1994)	4:02
17.	"Open Arms"	Steve Perry; Jonathan Cain	Daydream	3:30
Total length:				71:24

Disc 2
No.	Title	Writer(s)	Original album	Length
1.	"One Sweet Day" (with Boyz II Men)	Carey; Afanasieff; Michael McCary; Nathan Morris; Wanya Morris; Shawn Stockman	Daydream	4:42
2.	"Always Be My Baby"	Carey; Jermaine Dupri; Manuel Seal	Daydream	4:20
3.	"Forever"	Carey; Afanasieff	Daydream	4:01
4.	"Underneath the Stars"	Carey; Afanasieff	Daydream	3:35
5.	"Honey"	Carey; Sean Combs; Kamaal Fareed; Steven Jordan; Stephen Hague; Ronald Larkins; Bobby Robinson; Larry Price; Malcolm McLaren	Butterfly (1997)	5:02
6.	"Butterfly"	Carey; Afanasieff	Butterfly	4:36
7.	"My All"	Carey; Afanasieff	Butterfly	3:50
8.	"Sweetheart" (with JD)	Rainy Davis; Pete Warner	#1's (1998) (Note: and Life in 1472 (1998))	4:24
9.	"When You Believe" (with Whitney Houston)	Stephen Schwartz; Babyface	#1's (Note: and The Prince of Egypt and My Love Is Your Love (both 1998))	4:35
10.	"I Still Believe"	Antonina Armato; Giuseppe Cantarelli	#1's	3:56
11.	"Heartbreaker" (featuring Jay-Z)	Carey; Shawn Carter; Walden; Shirley Ellison; Lincoln Chase; Jeffrey Cohen	Rainbow (1999)	4:48
12.	"Thank God I Found You" (featuring Joe and 98 Degrees)	Carey; James Harris III; Terry Lewis	Rainbow	4:18
13.	"Can't Take That Away (Mariah's Theme)"	Carey; Diane Warren	Rainbow	4:32
14.	"Against All Odds" (featuring Westlife; international bonus track)	Phil Collins	Rainbow (Note: and Coast to Coast (2000))	3:21
15.	"All I Want for Christmas Is You" (So So Def Remix; featuring Jermaine Dupri and Lil' Bow Wow; bonus track)	Carey; Afanasieff; Arthur Baker; John Robie; Kevin Donovan; Ellis Williams; Robert Darrell Allen; John Miller; John Byas; Ralf Hütter; Florian Schneider	Non-album single	3:43
Total length:				63:38

Disc two – Japanese edition bonus track
No.	Title	Writer(s)	Original album	Length
16.	"Never Too Far/Hero Medley"	Carey; Afanasieff; Harris III; Lewis	Previously unreleased	4:48
Total length:				68:06

Disc 1 — The Essential Mariah Carey (US edition)
No.	Title	Writer(s)	Original album	Length
1.	"Vision of Love"	Carey; Margulies	Mariah Carey (1990)	3:31
2.	"Love Takes Time"	Carey; Margulies	Mariah Carey	3:48
3.	"Vanishing"	Carey; Margulies	Mariah Carey	4:11
4.	"I Don't Wanna Cry"	Carey; Walden	Mariah Carey	4:49
5.	"Emotions" (12" Club Mix)	Carey; Cole; Clivillés	Emotions (1991)	5:54
6.	"Can't Let Go"	Carey; Afanasieff	Emotions	4:27
7.	"Make It Happen"	Carey; Cole; Clivillés	Emotions	5:08
8.	"I'll Be There" (featuring Trey Lorenz)	Gordy; West; Davis; Hutch	MTV Unplugged (1992)	4:24
9.	"Dreamlover"	Carey; Hall	Music Box (1993)	3:54
10.	"Hero"	Carey; Afanasieff	Music Box	4:18
11.	"Without You"	Ham; Evans	Music Box	3:34
12.	"Anytime You Need A Friend" (C&C Club Remix)	Carey; Afanasieff	Music Box	10:55
13.	"Endless Love" (with Luther Vandross)	Lionel Richie	Songs (1994)	4:20
14.	"Fantasy"	Carey; Chris Frantz; Weymouth; Hall; Belew; Stanley	Daydream (1995)	4:04

Disc 2 — The Essential Mariah Carey (US edition)
No.	Title	Writer(s)	Original album	Length
1.	"One Sweet Day" (with Boyz II Men)	Carey; McCary; Morris; Morris; Stockman; Afanasieff	Daydream	4:42
2.	"Always Be My Baby"	Carey; Dupri; Seal	Daydream	4:20
3.	"Underneath the Stars"	Carey; Afanasieff	Daydream	3:33
4.	"Honey"	Carey; Combs; Fareed; Jordan; Hague; Robinson; Price; McLaren	Butterfly (1997)	4:59
5.	"Butterfly"	Carey; Afanasieff; Shea	Butterfly	4:34
6.	"My All"	Carey; Afanasieff	Butterfly	3:50
7.	"Close My Eyes"	Carey; Afanasieff	Butterfly	4:21
8.	"The Roof" (Mobb Deep Extended Version; featuring Mobb Deep & Big Noyd)	Carey; Jean-Claude Olivier; Samuel Barnes; Cory Rooney; Albert Johnson; Kejuan Muchita	Butterfly	5:31
9.	"When You Believe" (with Whitney Houston)	Schwartz	#1's (1998)	4:34
10.	"I Still Believe"	Armato; Cantarelli	#1's	3:54
11.	"Heartbreaker" (featuring Jay-Z)	Carey; Carter; Walden; Ellison; Chase; Cohen	Rainbow (1999)	4:46
12.	"Bliss"	Carey; Harris; Lewis; James "Big Jim" Wright	Rainbow	5:44
13.	"Thank God I Found You" (featuring Joe and 98 Degrees)	Carey; Harris; Lewis	Rainbow	4:17
14.	"Can't Take That Away (Mariah's Theme)"	Carey; Warren	Rainbow	4:32

Notes

- "I'll Be There" is a cover of the song originally performed by The Jackson 5
- "Without You" is a cover of the song originally performed by Badfinger
- "Endless Love" is a cover of the song originally performed by Lionel Richie and Diana Ross
- "Open Arms" is a cover of the song originally performed by Journey
- "Sweetheart" is a cover of the song originally performed by Rainy Davis
- "I Still Believe" is a cover of the song originally performed by Brenda K. Starr
- "Against All Odds" is a cover of the song originally performed by Phil Collins
- "Never Too Far/Hero Medley" is a medley of Carey's "Never Too Far" and "Hero"

== Personnel ==
Adapted from Greatest Hits liner notes.

- Mariah Carey – lead vocals, background vocals, arrangement, vocal arrangement, production, mixing
- Rhett Lawrence – production
- Narada Michael Walden – additional production, additional arrangement, production, arrangement
- Ben Marguiles – arrangement
- Chris Toland – arrangement
- Walter Afanasieff – production, arrangement
- Ric Wake – production
- David Cole – production, arrangement, mixing
- Robert Clivillés – production, arrangement, mixing
- Dave Hall – production, arrangement
- Boyz II Men – lead vocals, background vocals
- Jermaine Dupri – production, arrangement
- Manuel Seal – co-production
- Sean "Puffy" Combs – production
- The Ummah – production
- Stevie J – production
- Babyface – production
- Whitney Houston – lead vocals
- Mike Mason – production
- DJ Clue – production
- Ken "Duro" Ifill – production
- Jay-Z – lead vocals
- Jimmy Jam – production, arrangement
- Terry Lewis – production, arrangement
- Joe – lead vocals
- 98 Degrees – lead vocals
- Steve Mac – production
- Westlife – lead vocals
- Chris Austopchuk – art direction
- Julian Alexander – design
- Ria Shibayama – cover design
- Patrick DeMarchelier – photography

== Charts ==
=== Weekly charts ===
Chart (2001–2002)	Peak position
Australian Albums (ARIA)	60
Australian Urban Albums (ARIA)	8
Austrian Albums (Ö3 Austria)	40
Belgian Albums (Ultratop Flanders)	45
Belgian Albums (Ultratop Wallonia)	31
Dutch Albums (Album Top 100)	37
European Top 100 Albums (Music & Media)	40
French Compilations (SNEP)	3
German Albums (Offizielle Top 100)	36
Irish Albums (IRMA)	34
Italian Albums (FIMI)	25
Japanese Albums (Oricon)	3
New Zealand Albums (RMNZ)	11
Portuguese Albums (AFP)	7
Scottish Albums (Official Charts)	79
Swedish Albums (Sverigetopplistan)	28
Swiss Albums (Schweizer Hitparade)	17
UK Albums (Official Charts)	46
UK R&B Albums (Official Charts)	10
US Billboard 200	52
US Top R&B/Hip-Hop Albums (Billboard)	36

Chart (2005–2009)	Peak position
Danish Albums (Hitlisten)	10
European Albums (Top 100)	32
Scottish Albums (Official Charts)	20
Taiwanese Albums (Five Music)	17
UK Albums (Official Charts)	7
UK R&B Albums (Official Charts)	1

Chart (2010)	Peak position
South Korean International Albums (Circle)	85

The Essential Mariah Carey

Chart (2011–2022)	Peak position
Australian Albums (ARIA)	86
Greek Albums (IFPI)	64
South Korean Albums (Circle)	15
UK R&B Albums (OCC)	29
US Top R&B/Hip-Hop Albums (Billboard)	42

=== Year-end charts ===
Chart (2001)	Position
Canadian R&B Albums (SoundScan)	144

Chart (2002)	Position
Canadian R&B Albums (SoundScan)	128
Japanese Albums (Oricon)	93

Chart (2005)	Position
UK Albums (OCC)	40

The Essential Mariah Carey

Chart (2011)	Peak position
South Korean International Albums (Gaon)	61

== Certifications and sales ==
Region	Certification	Certified units/sales
Australia (ARIA)	3× Platinum	210,000^{‡}
Brazil (Pro-Música Brasil)	Platinum	125,000^{*}
France (SNEP)	Gold	100,000^{*}
Ireland (IRMA)	Platinum	15,000^{^}
Japan (RIAJ)	Platinum	200,000^{^}
New Zealand (RMNZ)	Platinum	15,000^{^}
South Korea	—	177,945
United Kingdom (BPI)	3× Platinum	900,000^{‡}
United States (RIAA)	2× Platinum	1,230,000
^{*} Sales figures based on certification alone.^{^} Shipments figures based on certification alone.^{‡} Sales+streaming figures based on certification alone.

== Release history ==
Region	Date	Release	Format	Label	Ref
United States	December 4, 2001	Greatest Hits	CD	Columbia	
Japan	December 12, 2001	Greatest Hits	CD	Sony Japan	
United Kingdom	October 10, 2005	The Best Of (Greatest Hits and The Remixes)	CD	Sony BMG	
Various	January 10, 2011	The Essential Mariah Carey	CD	Legacy	
United States	April 24, 2012	The Essential Mariah Carey	CD	Legacy	
