= Glitter (soundtrack) =

2001 soundtrack and studio album by Mariah Carey

Soundtrack album and studio album by Mariah Carey
- Released: August 18, 2001 (Note: Glitter was released by Sony Music in Japan on August 18, 2001. Originally scheduled for August 21, 2001, Virgin pushed back the release of the album in the U.S. to September 11, 2001, due to Carey's breakdown and hospitalization at the time.)
- Recorded: November 2000 – March 2001
- Studios: Battery (New York); Capri Digital (Capri); El Cortijo (Marbella); Flyte Tyme (Edina); Glenn Gould (Toronto); Larrabee West (Los Angeles); Marvin's Room (Los Angeles); The Hit Factory (New York City); Quad (New York); Record One (Los Angeles); Record Plant (Los Angeles); Sheffield Audio Truck (Los Angeles); Right Track (New York); TK Disc (Hawaii)
- Genres: Dance-pop; funk; hip hop; R&B
- Length: 51:45
- Label: Virgin
- Producers: Mariah Carey; Jimmy Jam and Terry Lewis; James "Big Jim" Wright; DJ Clue; Duro; Clark Kent; Damizza; Rick James; Walter Afanasieff

Mariah Carey chronology
Rainbow (1999)	Glitter (2001)	Greatest Hits (2001)

Singles from Glitter
- 1. "Loverboy" Released: June 19, 2001; 2. "Never Too Far" Released: August 14, 2001; 3. "Don't Stop (Funkin' 4 Jamaica)" Released: September 11, 2001; 4. "Reflections (Care Enough)" Released: September 27, 2001

Glitter is the soundtrack to the 2001 film of the same title and the eighth studio album by American singer-songwriter Mariah Carey. It was released on August 18, 2001, by Virgin Records. Mixing dance-pop, funk, hip hop, and R&B, the album was a departure from Carey's previous releases, focusing heavily on an '80s post-disco sound to accompany the film, which was set in 1983. Carey collaborated with Jimmy Jam and Terry Lewis and DJ Clue, who also co-produced the album. The album features several guest artists, including Eric Benét, Ludacris, Da Brat, Busta Rhymes, Fabolous, and Ja Rule.

Upon release, both the album and its accompanying film were panned by critics. Retrospective reviews, however, have been largely positive, with many stating that the album was unfairly maligned. Despite this, Glitter was universally viewed as a commercial and critical failure, leading Virgin Records to drop Carey from the label and buy out her $100 million contract. While the album debuted at number seven on the US Billboard 200, it marked Carey's lowest first-week sales up to that point. Internationally, it topped the charts in Greece, Japan, and South Korea, and has sold over two million copies.

Several singles were released, including "Loverboy", which served as the lead single and peaked at number two on the US Billboard Hot 100. Subsequent singles failed to make much of an impact on prominent global charts. Nearly two decades after its release, Glitter began to attract wide praise from mainstream critics and developed a cult following. On May 22, 2020, Carey announced the album's release on streaming services; however, it was removed in January 2026 for unknown reasons. A deluxe edition was released on October 30, 2026 in honor of its 25th anniversary.

== Background and development ==
In 1988, American singer Mariah Carey entered an eight-album recording contract with Sony Music after being signed to the company by record executive Tommy Mottola. Throughout the 1990s, she was the premier artist on the Columbia Records label and the decade's highest-selling female artist in the United States. Carey wed Mottola in 1993 and the couple divorced in 1998. As Mottola remained in charge of her recording career, Carey sought to hasten her departure from Columbia after the release of Butterfly (1997). Despite publicly reaffirming her commitment to Sony, Carey began privately gauging the interest of rival record labels in signing her. She renegotiated her contract, leading to the release of her seventh studio album Rainbow (1999), as well as the compilation albums #1's (1998), Greatest Hits (2001), and The Remixes (2003), in the following years.

Carey began work on All That Glitters, a film intended as her debut as a lead actress, in 1997 but the project was delayed while she fulfilled her contractual commitments and revisions to the script occurred. Carey began writing songs for the film's scenes in mid-1999, but paused to complete Rainbow. Intended for the film, "Heartbreaker" (1999) was instead released as the album's lead single. After the Rainbow World Tour concluded in April 2000, Carey resumed work on the soundtrack for All That Glitters before filming began in July. She partnered with Jimmy Jam and Terry Lewis, a production duo she previously collaborated with on Rainbow and its US number-one single "Thank God I Found You". By September, Jam and Lewis had completed a dozen songs for the soundtrack which was then scheduled for release in March 2001 along with the film. After filming concluded in October, both the release of the movie and the soundtrack were moved to the latter half of 2001.

Carey's relationship with Columbia deteriorated throughout 2000. Following a bidding war among record companies, she signed one of the largest deals in music industry history in April 2001: a four-album commitment with Virgin Records worth an estimated $80 million, plus a $20 million signing bonus. Carey bought out the soundtrack – the final album from her Sony contract – for $7 million, and Virgin compensated her the cost. Sony would retain distribution of the record in Japan, one of Carey's top music markets. Carey was amenable to Virgin due to the label's relationships with its artists Lenny Kravitz and Janet Jackson, as well as the monetary benefits: "Before this deal I was in bad shape financially for someone who needs to maintain a life and support my own management company and pay people salaries, rather than have a bunch of controlling figures around me". Carey's exit from Sony was reportedly expedited by her threat to publicize a sampling controversy involving the soundtrack's song "Loverboy".

== Composition ==
=== Genres and themes ===
Musically, Glitter differed notably from Carey's previous work, drawing heavy influence from the 1980s. Because the parent film is set in 1983, the soundtrack focused on recreating an older sound while incorporating the signature pop–R&B ballads for which Carey was known. While some critics favored the album's retro style and inclusion of sampled melodies, many felt that Glitter lacked originality and that its excess of guest artists overpowered Carey's artistry. In an interview with MTV News, Carey described the album's content and influences, noting:

There are songs that are definitely going to take people back and make them go, 'Oh, man, this song from the '80s — I loved it growing up'. Or people who never heard the songs before might be like, 'This is cool.' When you see the movie, you're gonna see the uptempo songs and the songs that are remakes in there as they would have sounded in the '80s, but the album is the way that I would make the record now, and the ballads can stand on their own as songs from a Mariah Carey album.

=== Music and lyrics ===
To me, Glitter is one of my best albums. A lot of people got confused, not knowing whether it was a soundtrack or an album or what.

— Carey addressing Glitter in 2001 during promotion for her Greatest Hits album.

The album begins with a remix of "Loverboy" featuring a sample from Cameo's "Candy", interpolating its instrumental and melody into the song's chorus. Sarah Rodman of the Boston Herald compared it to Carey's previous lead singles, describing its production as "another in an increasingly long line of glitzy, candy-coated, creatively stunted Carey songs". Sal Cinquemani of Slant Magazine described the song's lyrics and vocals as "super-sexed" compared to Carey's previous work. The remix features rap verses from Ludacris, Da Brat, Twenty II, and Shawnna. This is followed by "Lead the Way", originally conceptualized for Carey's 1997 album Butterfly. The song was written and produced by Carey and Walter Afanasieff. The ballad marked the last collaboration between the pair, as they ceased working together shortly after its completion due to growing creative differences. Recorded in 2000 during the early production of Glitter, the song begins with a classic, simple piano introduction, with Carey delivering soft, breathy vocals. This builds to a vocal climax in which she belts an 18-second note, the longest across all of her studio recordings. Carey has since cited the track as one of her "best vocal performances" and one of her "favorite songs."

"If We" features rappers Ja Rule and Nate Dogg and garnered comparisons to Ashanti and Christina Milian. "Didn't Mean to Turn You On" is a cover of the 1984 Cherrelle song of the same name. Carey co-produced the song with Jimmy Jam and Terry Lewis, incorporating synthesizer lines and keyboard arrangements to enhance the song's club appeal. In the song, Carey sings "I was only trying to be nice / Only trying to be nice / Sooooooo, I didn't mean to turn you on", portraying a protagonist who offers a weak apology for leading a man on. "Don't Stop (Funkin' 4 Jamaica)" was composed by Carey and DJ Clue and interpolates "Funkin' for Jamaica (N.Y.)" by Tom Browne. Featuring guest verses from Mystikal, the track features him declaring "Ain't nothin' you could do with the man / Except for shake your ass and clap your hands", while Carey responds "Don't stop baby, its ecstasy / Turn me up a little."

"All My Life" was penned by Rick James and was highlighted as an "album standout". This is followed by "Reflections (Care Enough)", which was written by Carey and Philippe Pierre. Lyrically, the protagonist "laments the end of a relationship", while confronting her mother regarding her early abandonment. Additionally, during the song's bridge, Carey "eerily" refers to the option of abortion over abandoning a child. Cinquemani felt the track recalled the ballads of Carey's earlier career, praising its "simple beauty". In a review for The Free Lance–Star, Heather Vaughn characterized it as an "emotional and heart-wrenching ballad".

Carey's cover of the 1982 Indeep song "Last Night a D.J. Saved My Life" is an uptempo club track. Featuring rappers Fabolous and Busta Rhymes, it was composed and produced by Carey and DJ Clue. The song received mixed reviews; Michael Paoletta of Billboard called it a "painful low" on Glitter, observing that Carey seemed detached and overpowered by the male guest artists. "Want You" features American singer Eric Benét and lyrically suggests the "exploration of bedroom fantasies." "Never Too Far" was written and produced by Carey alongside Jimmy Jam and Terry Lewis and was described as an "adult-contemporary, slow-jam love song". It features "a bed of synthesized strings, gentle drums and Spanish-style guitar" as its primary instrumentation, incorporating violin and keyboard arrangements ahead of the first verse.

This is followed by "Twister", a ballad described as "quietly heartbreaking", which addresses the suicide of Carey's friend and hairstylist, Tonjua Twist. According to Carey, Twist took her own life in the spring of 2000; she was known for her joy of life and ability to put others at ease. Although described as "child like and effervescent", Twist concealed "a well" of deep-rooted pain. In "Twister", Carey examined her friend's inner struggles in search of "closure", calling the song her "way of saying goodbye". Chuck Campley of the Daily News called the lyrics "an airy requiem for a friend lost to suicide" and regarded it as "the only memorable song on the album." Quoting the lines "Feelin' kinda fragile and I've got a lot to handle / But I guess this is my way of saying goodbye", David Browne of Entertainment Weekly speculated that Carey might have been alluding to her own emotional state rather than her friend's, given the turmoil surrounding the album's release. The album concludes with the original version of "Loverboy", featuring Cameo.

== Singles ==
"Loverboy" was released as the lead single from Glitter on June 19, 2001. The song received mixed reviews from music critics, who were divided over the inclusion of the "Candy" sample. It became Carey's lowest-charting lead single up to that point, peaking at number two on the Billboard Hot 100. Following Carey's widely publicized hospitalization and Virgin's retail price cut on the single, "Loverboy" reached its peak of number two on the chart. Despite strong physical sales, radio airplay remained limited because many radio DJs were unenthusiastic about its 1980s retro sound. With minimal promotional support due to Carey's hospitalization, "Loverboy" quickly fell down the Hot 100. Internationally, the song saw moderate success, peaking inside the top ten in Australia and Canada, and within the top twenty in Italy and the United Kingdom. The music video depicts Carey in various revealing outfits roaming a racetrack as her loverboy wins the race, presenting a more overtly sexual image than her previous videos.

"Never Too Far", the album's second single, was released on August 14, 2001. It failed to enter the US Billboard Hot 100 and charted poorly internationally. Because Carey was still recovering from her collapse, she was unable to film a music video. Instead, a promotional video was assembled using footage from Glitter, showing Billie Frank (played by Carey) performing the song at Madison Square Garden during her first sold-out concert. Frank's performance in the film omits the entire second verse, and the sequence runs in parallel with the movie's romantic storyline.

The album's third single, "Don't Stop (Funkin' 4 Jamaica)", released on September 11, 2001, mirrored the weak chart run of "Never Too Far", though it received higher rotation on MTV due to its music video. Directed by Sanaa Hamri, the video incorporates southern bayou themes and features Carey and Mystikal in Southern-inspired attire and hairstyles, with several shots displaying three versions of Carey singing into microphones simultaneously.

The fourth and final single from Glitter, "Reflections (Care Enough)", was issued as a limited release in Japan on September 27, 2001. Hampered by minimal promotion from Virgin and the absence of an accompanying music video, the single had negligible commercial impact.

"Last Night a DJ Saved My Life" was released as a promotional single in France and reached number 10 on the country's airplay chart in December 2001. Carey performed the song with DJ Clue and Fabolous at the Hammerstein Ballroom in New York City for the VH1/Vogue Fashion Awards, broadcast on October 23, 2001.

"Lead the Way" was planned to be released as a single in January 2002. Carey performed it during a guest appearance on the January 7, 2002, episode of American television series Ally McBeal. However, the single release was canceled as Virgin dropped Carey from the label.

Ahead of the 25th anniversary edition of Glitter, "Didn't Mean to Turn You On" and "All My Life" were released as promotional singles on August 20 and September 17, 2026, respectively. The former was issued alongside a remix featuring Jamaican-British singer Rochelle Jordan, while the latter was accompanied by a remix produced by and featuring rapper Channel Tres.

== Critical reception ==
Professional ratings
Aggregate scores
Source	Rating
Metacritic	59/100
Review scores
Source	Rating
AllMusic	2.5/5 stars
Blender	3/5 stars
E! Online	C
The Encyclopedia of Popular Music	2/5 stars
Entertainment Weekly	C
Los Angeles Times	2/4 stars
New York Daily News	2.5/5 stars
Rolling Stone	3/5 stars
Slant Magazine	3/5 stars
USA Today	1.5/4 stars

The review aggregator website Metacritic assigned the album a normalized score of 59 out of 100, indicating "mixed or average reviews". AllMusic critic Stephen Thomas Erlewine gave the album two-and-a-half out of five stars, calling it an "utter meltdown -- the pop equivalent of Chernobyl" and writing, "It's an embarrassment, one that might have been easier to gawk at if its creator wasn't so close to emotional destruction at the time of release." Michael Paoletta of Billboard was less critical, describing it as a "minor misstep in a stellar career that has earned the singer a few free passes." Sarah Rodman of the Boston Herald gave Glitter a mixed review, praising Carey's songwriting and vocals while criticizing the excess of secondary guest appearances. Rodman wrote that "the artists contribute mostly distracting, self-promoting jibber jabber all over what could have been Carey's best, most emotionally mature record to date." Daily News critic Chuck Campley rated the album two-and-a-half out of five stars, writing, "Maybe this was the best Mariah Carey could muster under the circumstances, but Glitter needed more work." David Browne of Entertainment Weekly gave Glitter a mixed review, criticizing the heavy presence of featured rappers and characterizing Carey's vocals as "barely there" on multiple tracks. Browne concluded: "Glitter is a mess, but its shameless genre hopping (and Carey's crash) makes it an unintentional concept album about the toll of relentless careerism."

Heather Vaughn of The Free Lance–Star gave Glitter a favorable review, complimenting both the dance-oriented tracks and the ballads. In evaluating their presence on the record, Vaughn wrote: "Sounds like Mariah's other albums, but with more of an 80s twist. The ballads really let you hear how stunning her voice actually is." Los Angeles Times critic Natalie Nichols gave Glitter two out of four stars, writing that Carey allowed the album to "reflect the synth-driven robo-funk of that wretched decade." Nichols called the album's covers "tepid and pointless" and agreed that Carey was overwhelmed by guest rappers, calling her voice "semi-disguised". Rob Sheffield of Rolling Stone awarded the album three out of five stars, criticizing the ballads as "big and goopy, with zero melodic or emotional punch." Aside from the ballads, Sheffield felt Glitter failed to deliver the standard of quality Carey needed for her film debut and soundtrack. He concluded his review with a comparison to Whitney Houston's multi-platinum The Bodyguard (1992): "Mariah still hasn't found her theme song, the one people will remember her voice by. Glitter is good enough to make you hope she finds it." Slant Magazine editor Sal Cinquemani gave Glitter three out of five stars, writing, "Carey's edgier tracks are inundated with so many guest artists that her sound ultimately becomes muddled; her pop tunes are so formulaic that it's difficult to distinguish one from the next." Edna Gundersen of USA Today rated the album one-and-a-half out of four stars, criticizing Carey's public image and the reliance on featured artists. She described Carey as "cheapening her image" and observed, "The whiff of desperation grows more pungent on Glitter in Carey's gratuitous coloratura and transparent enlistment of street-cred boosters such as rappers Ja Rule and Mystikal."

== Commercial performance ==
Glitter became Carey's least commercially successful album up to that point. It debuted at number seven on the Billboard 200 with first-week sales of 116,000 copies, far below the 323,000 first-week sales of her previous studio release, Rainbow (1999). Glitter became Carey's lowest-peaking album in the United States, spending only 12 weeks on the chart; it was certified platinum by the Recording Industry Association of America (RIAA), denoting shipments of one million units in the US. As of November 2018, Nielsen SoundScan estimated sales of the album at 666,000 copies in the United States. In Canada, the album peaked at number four on the Canadian Albums Chart. Glitter entered the Australian Albums Chart at its peak of number thirteen for the week dated September 9, 2001. Remaining on the chart for only three weeks, the album exited at number forty on September 23. Similarly, in Austria, Glitter peaked at number fourteen and remained on the chart for only four weeks.

In Belgium, Glitter peaked at number ten in Flanders and number eleven in Wallonia, spending four weeks on both charts. In France, the album reached number five on the albums chart for the week dated September 15, 2001. After seventeen weeks on the chart, it was certified Gold by the Syndicat National de l'Édition Phonographique (SNEP), denoting shipments of 100,000 units. On the Dutch Albums Chart, Glitter debuted at number twenty-six for the week dated September 22, 2001. Reaching its peak of number twelve the following week, the album spent a total of six weeks on the chart. In both New Zealand and Norway, Glitter peaked at number eleven, staying on the charts for four weeks and one week, respectively. In Switzerland, the album peaked at number seven and charted for ten weeks. The International Federation of the Phonographic Industry (IFPI) certified Glitter Gold in Switzerland for shipments of 20,000 copies. On the UK Albums Chart dated September 22, 2001, the album debuted at number ten. The following week, Glitter dropped to number twenty-seven before exiting after one additional week. As of July 2014, UK sales of the album stood at 55,080 units. In Japan, Glitter enjoyed notable commercial success, debuting atop the Oricon albums chart and selling 450,000 units within a month of release. Worldwide, the album has sold over two million copies as of 2002.

In November 2018, the album became the focus of a viral fan campaign that propelled it to number one on the iTunes album charts in multiple countries, including the United States.

== Controversies ==
=== "Loverboy" sample ===
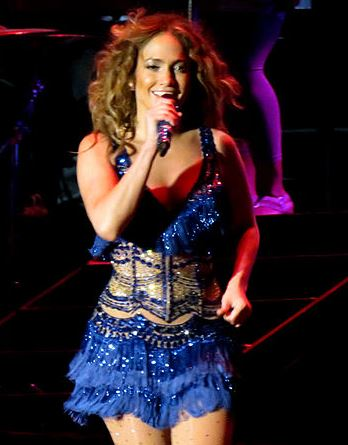
Jennifer Lopez was accused of copying the sample used in "Loverboy" in her number one hit "I'm Real".

Throughout 2000, Carey wrote and recorded material for Glitter, during which she developed the concept for "Loverboy". Originally, Carey sampled the melody and hook from the 1978 Yellow Magic Orchestra song "Firecracker", using an interpolation of it throughout the chorus and introduction. In early theatrical trailers for Glitter, the original version of "Loverboy" was featured. After Carey ended her contract with Columbia Records, Jennifer Lopez was signed by Tommy Mottola and began recording material for her album J.Lo (2001). According to record producer Irv Gotti, Mottola knew of Carey's use of the "Firecracker" sample and attempted to have Lopez use the same sample before Carey could release her track. At the time, Carey grew increasingly suspicious about outside executives learning details of Glitter, especially following news of Lopez's "theft" of the sample. When the music publishers for "Firecracker" were contacted, they confirmed that Carey had licensed the sample first (and was the first artist ever to request a license for it), while Lopez had licensed it more than a month later under Mottola's direction.

Ultimately, Carey was unable to use the original sample because Lopez's album was scheduled for release well before Glitter. She subsequently reworked "Loverboy" around a new sample: "Candy" by Cameo. The "Firecracker" sample was eventually used on Lopez's song "I'm Real". According to Gotti, Mottola instructed him to produce the "Murder Remix" of "I'm Real" to closely emulate another Glitter track he had produced, "If We", featuring rappers Ja Rule and Nate Dogg. The original version of "Loverboy" with the "Firecracker" sample was eventually released on Carey's 2020 compilation album The Rarities.

=== TRL incident ===
Following the start of promotion for Glitter and the release of the soundtrack's lead single "Loverboy", Carey embarked on a short promotional campaign for the song and album. On July 19, 2001, Carey made an unannounced appearance on the MTV program Total Request Live (TRL). As host Carson Daly began taping after a commercial break, Carey began singing "Loverboy" a cappella from behind a curtain. As Daly addressed the audience, Carey walked onto the stage pushing an ice cream cart while wearing an oversized men's shirt. Appearing exhilarated yet anxious, Carey distributed ice cream bars to audience members, waved to onlookers in Times Square, and jokingly remarked that the stunt was her "therapy". She then walked over to Daly's platform and performed an impromptu striptease, removing her shirt to reveal a tight yellow-and-green ensemble, prompting Daly to exclaim, "Mariah Carey has lost her mind!" While Carey later stated that Daly was aware of her presence in the studio beforehand, she acknowledged that he had acted surprised to heighten the dramatic effect for television. Her appearance on TRL attracted intense media coverage, with numerous commentators and news outlets characterizing her behavior as "troubled" and "erratic".

=== Hospitalization ===
In the days following her appearance on TRL, Carey continued to display behavior described as erratic. On July 20, she held an autograph session for the CD single of "Loverboy" at the Roosevelt Field shopping mall on Long Island. In front of fans and news cameras, she spoke ramblingly on various topics before complaining about how radio host Howard Stern's jokes about her were deeply upsetting, adding that everything in life ought to be positive. Carey's publicist, Cindi Berger, intervened by taking the microphone and asking camera crews to stop filming. Berger later noted, "She was not speaking clearly and not talking about what she had come to talk about: her record." A few days later, Carey posted several disjointed voice messages on her official website:

I'm trying to understand things in life right now and so I really don't feel that I should be doing music right now. What I'd like to do is just a take a little break or at least get one night of sleep without someone popping up about a video. All I really want is [to] just be me and that's what I should have done in the first place ... I don't say this much but guess what, I don't take care of myself.

After the messages were quickly removed, Berger stated that Carey had been "obviously exhausted and not thinking clearly" when she posted them. Two days later, on July 26, Carey was admitted to a hospital, citing "extreme exhaustion" and a "physical and emotional breakdown". News outlets reported rumors that Carey had threatened self-harm the previous night and that her mother, Patricia, had called emergency services. When asked about reports of self-inflicted injuries, Berger explained that Carey had broken dishes out of distress and accidentally cut her hands and feet. Carey remained hospitalized at an undisclosed facility in Connecticut under medical supervision for two weeks, followed by an extended hiatus from public life.

In April 2018, Carey revealed in an interview with People that she had been diagnosed with Bipolar II disorder during that 2001 hospitalization.

=== Project delay ===
Following widespread media coverage of Carey's breakdown and hospitalization, Virgin Records and 20th Century Fox postponed the release of both the film Glitter and its accompanying soundtrack. On August 9, 2001, it was announced that the release dates would be delayed by three weeks: the soundtrack was moved from August 21 to September 11, and the film from August 31 to September 21. (Note: The release of the soundtrack in Japan by Sony Music was unaffected, and it was released on August 18, 2001.) When asked about the postponement, Nancy Berry, vice chairman of Virgin Music Group Worldwide, addressed Carey's condition:

Mariah is looking forward to being able to participate in both her album and movie projects and we are hopeful that this new soundtrack release date will allow her to do so. She has been making great recovery progress, and continues to grow stronger every day. Virgin Music Worldwide continues to give its absolute commitment and support to Mariah on every level.

Reflecting on the album's commercial underperformance, Carey attributed part of the difficulty to the September 11 attacks. Discussing the timing, she stated: "I released it on September 11, 2001. The talk shows needed something to distract from 9/11. I became a punching bag. I was so successful that they tore me down because my album was at number 2 instead of number 1. The media was laughing at me and attacked me." Matthew Jacobs of Vulture observed, "two dynamics were working against [the film] at once: post-9/11, Americans simply weren't going to the movies, and certainly not to see what had been framed as a slice of celebrity fluff".

=== Departure from Virgin ===
Glitter performed poorly at the box office, and the soundtrack suffered sluggish sales. Consequently, Virgin invoked a contractual clause allowing the label to terminate its $100 million deal with Carey for an exit payout of approximately $28 million. Virgin subsequently dropped Carey from its roster, motivated by poor record sales and negative publicity surrounding her hospitalization. During settlement discussions, Carey's representatives asked that both parties describe the venture publicly as having been "canceled". Less than 24 hours later, Virgin issued a statement declaring that it had "terminated" the contract and paid Carey $28 million. Carey's legal team threatened litigation, with attorney Marshall Grossman calling Virgin's conduct "deplorable". Virgin countered that the $28 million figure represented only the departure buyout, excluding the $23.5 million the label had already paid under the agreement for the single album produced. Virgin also threatened a defamation countersuit in response to statements from Carey's camp. The dispute was ultimately settled out of court. Soon afterward, Carey traveled to Italy for a five-month stay. Several months later, she signed a new $20 million recording contract with Island Records, which included the establishment of her own imprint label, MonarC Entertainment.

== Legacy and cultural impact ==
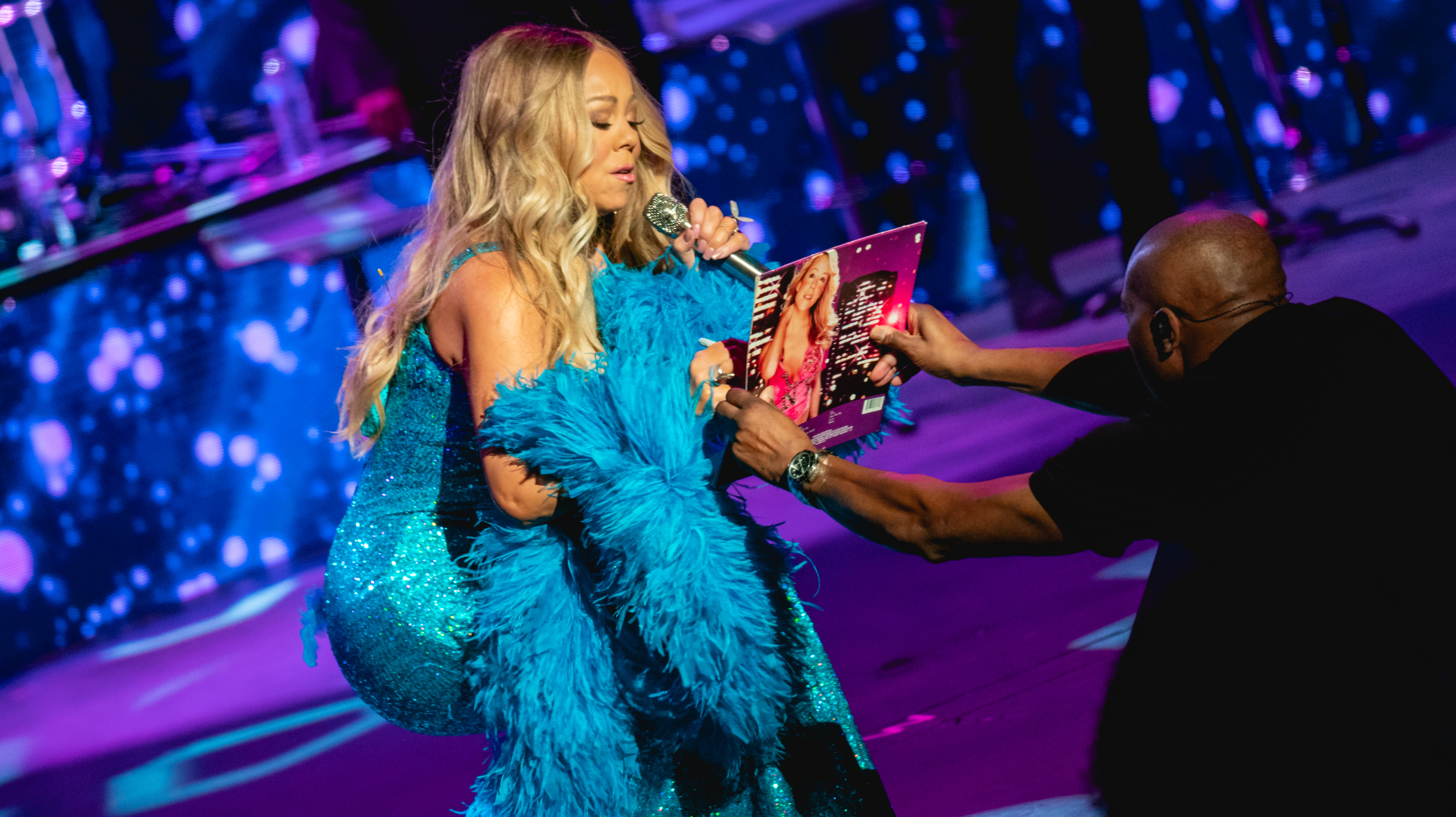
Carey signing a vinyl copy of the album in 2018, during the #JusticeForGlitter campaign

Almost two decades after its release, Glitter underwent a critical reappraisal and developed a strong cult following. Kara Brown of Jezebel praised the soundtrack, remarking, "Mariah was ahead of us all and the time is now". Mike Wass of Idolator described Glitter as "a misunderstood [record]" and called it one of "the biggest pop music injustices of the 21st century". Daniel Welsh of MSN gave the album positive feedback, writing that "the brilliance of Glitter has gone unappreciated for too long". In an article for Complex, Michael Arceneaux described the project as "the perfect '80s tribute". Writing for Vulture, Dee Lockett characterized the record as "undeniably ahead of its time even despite it being an homage to disco."

In 2017, Everett Brothers of Billboard ranked "Lead the Way" as the second most underappreciated song in Carey's discography, with "There for Me"—a B-side to the 2001 single "Never Too Far/Hero Medley"—ranked third. Brothers argued that "Lead the Way" showcases Carey's "strongest vocal performance of the 2000s." Rich Juzwiak of Gawker ranked "Loverboy" eighteenth on his list of Carey's best singles. In a 2014 article for MySpace, Steven J. Horowitz praised the remix version of "Loverboy" included on the album's tracklist: "Mariah invoked the ‘80s and relatively played the background to satiating verses from hot-right-nows and longtime friends.". Horowitz ranked the remix eleventh among all of Carey's remixes, while Mark Graham of VH1 ranked it thirtieth overall in her catalogue.

In October 2020, nineteen years after its recording, the original version of "Loverboy" with the "Firecracker" sample was officially released on the compilation album The Rarities. Retrospectively reviewing the album on its twentieth anniversary, Billboard writer Jon O'Brien observed:

"Glitter was heavily criticized at the time for overloading its ten tracks with guest rappers. DJ Clue, Busta Rhymes and Fabolous essentially relegate Carey to supporting player on a perfunctory cover of Indeep's club classic "Last Night a DJ Saved My Life," while Nate Dogg and Ja Rule compete for attention on the anachronistic turn-of-the-century hip-pop of "If We." Yet look at any given top 10 from the last decade and you could argue Carey was simply foreshadowing a time when every other hit has a featuring, vs or x credit".

PopMatters writer Peter Piatkowski designated Glitter one of the "best dance-pop albums of the last 20 years."

In early 2026, the album was removed from all streaming services. Carey later confirmed that for the album's 25th anniversary that year, a deluxe edition of the album would be released. The deluxe edition of the album, featuring 15 additional tracks, was released on October 30, 2026.

=== #JusticeForGlitter ===
In November 2018, the album was the focus of a viral fan campaign during the promotional lead-up to Carey's fifteenth studio album, Caution. Promoted on social media under the hashtag #JusticeForGlitter, the effort sent the album to number one on iTunes album charts in several territories, including the United States, and into the top 10 worldwide. Carey acknowledged and thanked fans for the campaign across social media and in interviews. She later incorporated a medley of songs from Glitter into the setlist of her Caution World Tour as a tribute to her fans.

== Track listing ==
Glitter
No.	Title	Writer(s)	Producer(s)	Length
1.	"Loverboy" (remix) (featuring Da Brat, Ludacris, Twenty II and Shawnna)	Mariah Carey; Larry Blackmon; Thomas Jenkins; Da Brat; Ludacris; Twenty II; Shawnna	Clark Kent; Carey	4:30
2.	"Lead the Way"	Carey; Walter Afanasieff	Carey; Afanasieff; Jimmy Jam^{[a]}; Terry Lewis^{[a]}; James "Big Jim" Wright^{[a]}	3:53
3.	"If We" (featuring Nate Dogg and Ja Rule)	Carey; Damion Young; Jeffrey Atkins; Howie Hersh; Nathaniel Hale	Damizza; Carey	4:20
4.	"Didn't Mean to Turn You On"	James Harris III; Lewis	Jam; Lewis; Carey	4:54
5.	"Don't Stop (Funkin' 4 Jamaica)" (featuring Mystikal)	Carey; DJ Clue; Duro; Thomas Brown; Toni Smith; Michael Tyler	Carey; Clue; Duro	3:38
6.	"All My Life"	Rick James	Carey; James	5:10
7.	"Reflections (Care Enough)"	Carey; Philippe Pierre	Jam; Lewis; Carey	3:21
8.	"Last Night a DJ Saved My Life" (featuring Busta Rhymes, Fabolous and DJ Clue)	Michael Cleveland	Carey; Clue; Duro	6:43
9.	"Want You" (featuring Eric Benét)	Carey; Harris III; Lewis; Wright	Jam; Lewis; Carey	4:44
10.	"Never Too Far"	Carey; Harris III; Lewis	Jam; Lewis; Carey	4:21
11.	"Twister"	Carey; Harris III; Lewis; Wright	Jam; Lewis; Carey; Wright^{[b]}	2:26
12.	"Loverboy" (featuring Cameo)	Carey; Blackmon; Jenkins	Kent; Carey	3:50
Total length:				51:45

Deluxe edition bonus disc
No.	Title	Writer(s)	Producer(s)	Length
1.	"Out Here on My Own"	Lesley Gore; Michael Gore	Carey	3:18
2.	"Never Too Far/Hero Medley"	Carey; Afanasieff; Harris III; Lewis	Carey; Jam; Lewis; Randy Jackson^{[b]}	4:48
3.	"Loverboy" (Firecracker original version)	Carey; Martin Denny	Carey; Kent^{[b]}	3:16
4.	"All My Life" (Channel Tres remix)	James	Carey; James; Channel Tres^{[a]}	4:41
5.	"Didn't Mean to Turn You On" (with Rochelle Jordan)	Harris III; Lewis	Jam; Lewis; Carey; KLSH^{[a]}	4:00
6.	"Loverboy" (MJ Cole remix) (featuring Cameo and Da Brat)	Carey; Blackmon; Jenkins; Da Brat	Kent; Carey; MJ Cole^{[a]}	5:50
7.	"Loverboy" (Club of Love remix) (featuring Cameo)	Carey; Blackmon; Jenkins	Kent; Carey; David Morales^{[a]}	9:05
8.	"Want You" (solo version)	Carey; Harris III; Lewis; Wright	Jam; Lewis; Carey	4:44
9.	"All My Life" (acapella)	James	Carey; James	4:55
10.	"Lead the Way" (1997 version)	Carey; Afanasieff	Carey; Afanasieff; Jam^{[a]}; Lewis^{[a]}; Wright^{[a]}	3:53
11.	"Out Here on My Own" (alternate vocal take version)	L. Gore; M. Gore	Carey	3:16
12.	"Never Too Far" (writing session interlude)	Carey; Harris III; Lewis	Jam; Lewis; Carey	0:47
13.	"Never Too Far" (rough demo version)	Carey; Harris III; Lewis	Jam; Lewis; Carey	4:07
14.	"Never Too Far/Hero Medley" (with Westlife)	Carey; Afanasieff; Harris III; Lewis	Carey; Jam; Lewis; Randy Jackson^{[b]}	4:11
15.	"Glitter Medley" ("Never Too Far"/"Last Night a DJ Saved My Life"/"Loverboy"/"Didn't Mean to Turn You On") (live from the Caution World Tour, 2019)	Carey; Harris III; Lewis; Cleveland; Blackmon; Jenkins	Carey; Jam; Lewis; Kent	8:12

=== Notes ===
- ^a signifies an additional producer
- ^b signifies a co-producer
- Disc two's track 6 originally appeared on Japanese pressings.
- Deluxe edition vinyl pressings include disc two's tracks 1–3.

Sample credits

- "Loverboy" and its remix contain a sample of "Candy" by Cameo.
- "Didn't Mean to Turn You On" is a cover of Cherrelle's "I Didn't Mean to Turn You On". The cover was produced by Jimmy Jam and Terry Lewis, who produced Cherrelle's original song. Carey sang over the original instrumental as well.
- "Don't Stop (Funkin' 4 Jamaica)" contains interpolations of "Funkin' for Jamaica (N.Y.)" by Tom Browne.
- "Last Night a DJ Saved My Life" contains a sample of "Put Your Hands Where My Eyes Could See" by Busta Rhymes and is a cover of "Last Night a D.J. Saved My Life" by Indeep.

== Personnel ==
Credits are adapted from the liner notes of Glitter.

- Mariah Carey – arranger, executive producer, producer, vocal arrangement, vocals, background vocals
- Eric Benét – performer
- Elliott Blakey – assistant
- Lee Blaske – string arrangements
- Busta Rhymes – performer
- Cameo – performer
- Da Brat – performer
- Damizza – producer
- Dana Jon Chappelle – engineer, vocal engineer, mixing
- DJ Clue – producer, background vocals
- Fabolous – performer
- Tony Gonzales – assistant
- Kevin Guarnieri – assistant engineer, digital editing
- Fernando Harkless – flute
- Michael Herring – guitar
- Steve Hodge – engineer, mixing
- Ja Rule – performer
- Jimmy Jam – arranger, executive producer, producer, production assistant
- John Kennedy – violin
- Clark Kent – producer
- Anthony Kilhoffer – assistant
- Terry Lewis – arranger, executive producer, producer, production assistant
- Bryan Loren – keyboards
- Trey Lorenz – background vocals
- Ludacris – performer
- Bob Ludwig – mastering
- Brenda Mickens – violin
- Mystikal – performer
- Jon Nettlesbey – assistant
- Pete Novak – assistant
- Tim Olmstead – assistant
- Derek Organ – drums
- Alice Preves – violin
- Alexander Richbourg – drum programming
- David Rideau – engineer
- Torrel Ruffin – guitar
- Leslie Shank – violin
- Pitnarry Shin – cello
- Ryan Smith – assistant
- Xavier Smith – assistant, assistant engineer, mixing
- Jason Stasium – assistant
- Tamas Strasser – violin
- Mary Ann Tatum – background vocals
- Bradley Yost – assistant, assistant engineer, mixing

== Charts ==
=== Weekly charts ===
2001–2002 weekly chart performance
Chart	Peak position
Australian Albums (ARIA)	13
Australian Urban Albums (ARIA)	1
Austrian Albums (Ö3 Austria)	14
Belgian Albums (Ultratop Flanders)	10
Belgian Albums (Ultratop Wallonia)	11
Canadian Albums (Billboard)	4
Danish Albums (Hitlisten)	12
Dutch Albums (Album Top 100)	12
European Top 100 Albums (Music & Media)	5
French Albums (SNEP)	5
German Albums (Offizielle Top 100)	7
Greek Albums (IFPI)	1
Hungarian Albums (MAHASZ)	37
Irish Albums (IRMA)	28
Italian Albums (FIMI)	5
Japanese Albums (Oricon)	1
Malaysian Albums (RIM)	6
New Zealand Albums (RMNZ)	11
Norwegian Albums (VG-lista)	11
Polish Albums (ZPAV)	23
Scottish Albums (Official Charts)	39
Spanish Albums (PROMUSICAE)	3
South Korean Albums (RIAK)	1
Swedish Albums (Sverigetopplistan)	30
Swiss Albums (Schweizer Hitparade)	10
UK Albums (Official Charts)	10
UK R&B Albums (Official Charts)	1
UK Soundtrack Albums (Official Charts)	30
US Billboard 200	7
US Soundtrack Albums (Billboard)	1
US Top R&B/Hip-Hop Albums (Billboard)	6

2018 weekly chart performance
Chart	Peak position
UK Album Downloads (Official Charts)	26
UK R&B Albums (Official Charts)	5
UK Soundtrack Albums (Official Charts)	9
US Soundtrack Albums (Billboard)	14

2026 weekly chart performance for the reissue
Chart	Peak position
Belgian Albums (Ultratop Flanders)	152
Spanish Albums (Promusicae)	98
UK Album Downloads (Official Charts)	11
UK R&B Albums (Official Charts)	5
UK Soundtrack Albums (Official Charts)	7
US Billboard 200	153
US Soundtrack Albums (Billboard)	4
US Top R&B/Hip-Hop Albums (Billboard)	48

=== Monthly charts ===
2001 monthly chart performance
Chart	Peak position
South Korean International Albums (RIAK)	1

=== Year-end charts ===
2001 year-end chart performance
Chart	Position
Canadian R&B Albums (SoundScan)	51
French Albums (SNEP)	110
Japanese Albums (Oricon)	88
US Top Soundtrack Albums (Billboard)	14

2002 year-end chart performance
Chart	Position
Canadian R&B Albums (Nielsen SoundScan)	159

== Certifications ==
Certifications and sales
Region	Certification	Certified units/sales
Brazil (Pro-Música Brasil)	Gold	60,000
Canada	—	34,437
France (SNEP)	Gold	100,000^{*}
Japan (RIAJ)	Platinum	450,000
South Korea	—	59,057
Spain (Promusicae)	Gold	50,000^{^}
Switzerland (IFPI Switzerland)	Gold	20,000^{^}
United Kingdom	—	55,080
United States (RIAA)	Platinum	666,000
Summaries
Worldwide	—	2,000,000
^{*} Sales figures based on certification alone.^{^} Shipments figures based on certification alone.

== Release history ==
Release dates and formats
Region	Date	Edition(s)	Format(s)	Label(s)	Ref.
Japan	August 18, 2001	Standard	CD	Sony Japan	
Australia	August 27, 2001	Standard	Cassette; CD	EMI	
South Korea	August 27, 2001	Standard	Cassette; CD	EMI	
France	September 9, 2001	Standard	CD	Virgin	
Germany	September 10, 2001	Standard	CD	EMI	
United Kingdom	September 10, 2001	Standard	Cassette; CD	Virgin	
Canada	September 11, 2001	Standard	CD	EMI	
United States	September 11, 2001	Standard	Cassette; CD; vinyl	Virgin	
Various	May 22, 2020	Standard	Digital download; streaming (Note: unavailable between January 29 – October 30, 2026)	Mariah	
Various	October 30, 2026	Standard	Vinyl (Note: alongside a CD reissue)	Mariah; UM^{e}	
Various	October 30, 2026	Deluxe	Digital download; streaming; vinyl	Mariah; UM^{e}	
