= Last Night a D.J. Saved My Life =

1982 song by Indeep

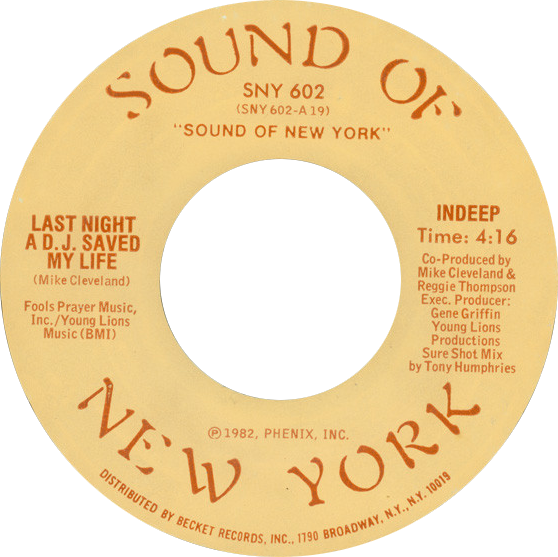
- One of side-A variants of the US 7-inch single

Single by Indeep

from the album Last Night a D.J. Saved My Life!
- B-side: "D.J. Delight"
- Released: 1982
- Recorded: 1982
- Genre: Post-disco
- Length: 5:40 (12"/LP); 4:16 (7")
- Label: Sound of New York; Becket; (SNY-5102)
- Songwriter: Michael Cleveland
- Producers: Mike Cleveland; Reggie Thompson

Indeep singles chronology
"Last Night a D.J. Saved My Life" (1982)	"When Boys Talk" (1983)

Music video
- "Last Night a D.J. Saved My Life" on YouTube

"Last Night a D.J. Saved My Life" is a song written by Michael Cleveland and sung by American group Indeep. It was released as a single in 1982 by Sound of New York and Becket Records. It features vocals from Réjane "Reggie" Magloire and Rose Marie Ramsey, and appears as the third track of the eponymous album (1983). The single peaked at numbers ten and two on the US Billboard R&B/Hip-Hop Singles and Club Singles charts respectively.

== Music and lyrics ==
The lyrics tell the story of a woman who is bored alone at home. She wants to speak to her man, but cannot reach him and considers leaving him, until a DJ plays a hot song and thereby saves her from a broken heart. In the second verse, she leaves home, but does not reach her destination.

The song was mixed by Michael Jay at Eastern Artists Recording Studio, East Orange, New Jersey.

== Chart performance ==
In the US, "Last Night a D.J. Saved My Life" reached number ten on the Billboard R&B/Hip-Hop Singles chart and number two on the Billboard Club Singles chart. In February 1983, it peaked at number thirteen in the United Kingdom, and in March 1983 at number two on the Dutch Top 40.

In Belgium (Flanders), it reached number two on the Ultratop 50. It also made number five in Switzerland, number 12 in Austria and number 25 in New Zealand. In West Germany, it reached number 10.

Because of the limited success of Indeep's later releases, the group's first single was its only major hit and placed it into the one-hit wonder category of artists.

== Reception ==
Rolling Stone magazine declared the song "one of the greatest songs ever written about being a girl, listening to the radio, or any combination of the two," and, in 2005, editors of Blender magazine placed it at number 406 on its "500 Greatest Songs Since You Were Born" list. The song also provided the inspiration of the title of the book Last Night a DJ Saved My Life: The History of the Disc Jockey (2000). In 2022, Rolling Stone ranked it number five in their list of "200 Greatest Dance Songs of All Time". In 2024, Forbes ranked it number 26 in their list of "The 30 Greatest Disco Songs of All Time".

In 2025, Billboard magazine ranked "Last Night a DJ Saved My Life" number 62 in their "The 100 Best Dance Songs of All Time", writing, "Indeep's signature post-disco hit spawned catchphrases still found in the DNA of dance music decades later because its magnetic groove struts it like it talks it, tapping into the lifeforce of everything that gets us past boredom and broken hearts and gets us up, gets us on, gets us down. And when it comes the DJ's time to preach, he's got a better pitch than the overwhelming majority of would-be messiahs: There's not a problem that I can't fix/ 'Coz I can do it in the mix."

== Charts ==
=== Weekly charts ===
Chart (1983)	Peak position
Australia (Kent Music Report)	86
Austria (Ö3 Austria Top 40)	12
Belgium (Ultratop 50 Flanders)	2
Finland (Suomen virallinen lista)	5
France (IFOP)	7
Greece (Pop & Rock)	1
Ireland (IRMA)	18
Netherlands (Dutch Top 40)	2
Netherlands (Single Top 100)	2
New Zealand (Recorded Music NZ)	25
South Africa (Springbok)	7
Spain (AFYVE)	7
Switzerland (Schweizer Hitparade)	5
UK Singles (Official Charts)	13
US Billboard Hot 100	101
US Hot R&B/Hip-Hop Songs (Billboard)	10
US Hot Dance Club Play (Billboard)	2
West Germany (GfK)	10
Zimbabwe (ZIMA)	1

=== Year-end charts ===
Chart (1983)	Position
Belgium (Ultratop 50 Flanders)	50
Netherlands (Dutch Top 40)	43
Netherlands (Single Top 100)	27
West Germany (GfK)	60

== Certifications ==
Region	Certification	Certified units/sales
United Kingdom (BPI)	Silver	200,000^{‡}
^{‡} Sales+streaming figures based on certification alone.

== Notable covers ==
- In 1990, a version by Olimax and DJ Shapps, featuring vocals by Lorna Stucki, reached No. 98 on the UK Singles Chart.
- Another 1990s cover by Coldjam featuring Grace charted #64 in the UK.
- In 2001, American R&B singer Mariah Carey co-produced a cover of "Last Night a DJ Saved My Life" with DJ Clue and Duro, which appeared on her eighth album, Glitter. Carey's version of the song features Fabolous and Busta Rhymes, and it is heard during a scene in the film Glitter, in which Carey starred.
- In 2003, Fab For with Robert Owens released a version with somewhat changed lyrics under the title "Last Night a DJ Blew My Mind", reaching number 34 on the UK Singles Chart and number six on the UK Dance Chart.
- In 2004, UK house/trance music producer Seamus Haji made several popular remixes of the song through his own label, Big Love Records, and released them on a 12" single titled "Last Night a DJ Saved My Life (ATFC Mixes)". This version reached number thirteen on the UK Singles Chart and number one on the UK Dance Chart in 2006.
