= Don't Stop (Funkin' 4 Jamaica) =

Single by Mariah Carey featuring Mystikal

from the album Glitter
- Released: September 11, 2001
- Studio: Right Track Studios (New York City); Battery Studios (New York City); El Cortijo (Marbella, Spain)
- Genre: Funk; hip-hop; R&B
- Length: 3:37
- Label: Virgin
- Songwriters: Mariah Carey; DJ Clue; Duro; Mystikal; Tom Browne; Toni Smith
- Producers: Mariah Carey; DJ Clue; Duro

Mariah Carey singles chronology
| "Never Too Far" (2001) | "Don't Stop (Funkin' 4 Jamaica)" (2001) | "Reflections (Care Enough)" (2001) |

Mystikal singles chronology
| "Bouncin' Back (Bumpin' Me Against the Wall)" (2001) | "Don't Stop (Funkin' 4 Jamaica)" (2001) | "Tarantula" (2002) |

Audio video
- "Don't Stop (Funkin' 4 Jamaica)" on YouTube

"Don't Stop (Funkin' 4 Jamaica)" is a song by American singer-songwriter Mariah Carey, featuring Mystikal, from her first soundtrack and eighth studio album Glitter (2001). It was written by herself, DJ Clue, Duro, and Mystikal, while production was handled by the former three. The song is built around a sample of the 1980 song "Funkin' for Jamaica (N.Y.)" produced by Tom Browne and Toni Smith, who are credited as co-writers. It was released as the album's third single on September 11, 2001 by Virgin Records America. The song features Mystikal evoking his past single "Shake Ya Ass" during his verses, while Carey tells him "don't stop".

"Don't Stop (Funkin' 4 Jamaica)" received mixed reviews from music critics, who liked the song, but thought Carey was overshadowed. Like the preceding singles from the album, "Don't Stop (Funkin' 4 Jamaica)" failed to make any significant impact on the charts. It appeared on Billboard's Bubbling Under Hot 100 chart, a component of the Billboard Hot 100, thus peaking at number 123. It reached the top forty in the United Kingdom and Australia, as part of a double A-side with "Never Too Far". The music video for the song directed by Sanaa Hamri depicts Carey and Mystikal performing in a southern club, with the former being cloned by three.

== Background ==
In April 2001, Carey signed an estimated US$100 million record deal with Virgin Records. Following commencement for Glitter — her first album under the new label — and the film of same name, Carey embarked on a massive promotional campaign for the project. In July of the same year, Carey made a controversial appearance on the MTV program Total Request Live (TRL). She came out onto the filming stage, pushing an ice cream cart while wearing an oversized shirt. Seemingly anxious and exhilarated, Carey began giving out individual bars of ice cream to fans and guests on the program, while waving to the crowd down below on Times Square, while diverging into a rambling monologue regarding therapy. Carey then walked to Daly's platform and began a striptease, in which she shed her shirt to reveal a tight yellow and green ensemble, leading him to exclaim "Mariah Carey has lost her mind!".

Following other appearances on which her publicist Cindy Berger said the singer was "not thinking clearly", she was hospitalized, citing "extreme exhaustion" and a "physical and emotional breakdown". Following her induction at an un-disclosed hospital in Connecticut, Carey remained hospitalized and under doctor's care for two weeks, followed by an extended absence from the album's promotion. "Don't Stop (Funkin' 4 Jamaica)" was sent to rhythmic contemporary radio formats in the United States on September 11, 2001; it was later released worldwide as the third single from Glitter by Virgin Records America, as a double A-side single with "Never Too Far". The song appears in a scene of the film Glitter, when producer Julian "Dice" Black has met Billie Frank (played by Carey) and invites her to an impromptu freestyle jam session in his club.

== Composition ==
"Don't Stop (Funkin' 4 Jamaica)"
21 second sample of Mariah Carey's "Don't Stop (Funkin' 4 Jamaica)".

"Don't Stop (Funkin' 4 Jamaica)" was composed by Carey, Mystikal, Duro and DJ Clue, and interpolates "Funkin' for Jamaica (N.Y.)" by Tom Browne. Due to the song's use of the sample, Browne and Toni Smith also received writing credits. Its usage "tweaks minor pieces to form an update". Featuring guest verses from rapper Mystikal, he declares "Ain't nothin' you could do with the man / Except for shake your ass and clap your hands", while Carey responds "Don't stop bay-beee, its ex-ta-see / Turn me up a little". According to Est. 1997 website, Carey and Mystikal created a "brilliant marriage between an 80s funk jam and 2000s rap". The rapper's vocals were compared to those of James Brown by Larry Nager from The Cincinnati Enquirer. For his part, James Salmon from Dotmusic commented that Carey "plays the heavy breathing, bikini-clad booty girl to Mystical's gentlemanly cries of 'shake ya ass' and 'get on the floor'".

== Critical reception ==
"Don't Stop (Funkin' 4 Jamaica)" received mixed reviews from music critics. Harry Guerin from Raidió Teilifís Éireann wrote that Carey "works better on raunch not regrets and her duets" like on the song, which perfectly captured the film's 1980's vibe, also complimenting its "clinical" production which "you wonder whether the engineers work masks and gowns at the mixing desk", proving that Carey should "spend more time around DJs and decks and less with grand pianos". A writer from BET network included the track on their list of "Mariah Carey Singles That Deserved to Be No. 1 (But Didn't Get There)", stating that "not even Mystikal could help a track that was cursed by simply being part of the Glitter soundtrack". Its "catchiness" was also praised, while also commenting that it should have receive more attention. Natalie Nichols from the Los Angeles Times gave a mixed statement, commenting how the song was "almost campy", but "guilty fun".

Witney Seibold from Mandatory website was mixed, saying "This may be my favorite or second favorite track on the record", but criticized the fact that Carey was "so often in the background", and wondered if Glitter was her "ploy to move from the forefront of her records to a more production-heavy vocation". For his part, Slant Magazine editor Sal Cinquemani wrote that "not all of Glitter is, ahem, gold. Carey is relegated to a virtual hood ornament of Don't Stop". Larry Nager from The Cincinnati Enquirer commented that Carey "grooves with less success to Tom Browne's '80s fusion hit, 'Funkin' for Jamaica'". People magazine was more negative, stating that the song borrowed "a little too lazily" from its sampled song. James Salmon from Dotmusic was also negative, saying it was "highly jaded and predictably uninteresting. But we'll let her off just this once".

== Chart performance ==
"Don't Stop (Funkin' 4 Jamaica)" failed to make any significant impact on the charts. It failed to reach the US Billboard Hot 100, however it peaked inside of the Bubbling Under Hot 100, which acts as an extension of the former chart, peaking at number 123 on the week dated October 27, 2001. It also reached number 42 on the US Hot R&B/Hip-Hop Songs component chart. Worldwide, "Don't Stop (Funkin' 4 Jamaica)" was released as a double A-side with "Never Too Far". In the United Kingdom, the release reached a position of number 32. It also managed to reach peaks of numbers 36 and 16 in Australia and Spain, respectively. "Never Too Far/Don't Stop (Funkin' 4 Jamaica)" reached numbers 67 and 65 in the Netherlands and Switzerland, respectively. In both the Flemish and Wallonian territories in Belgium, the single peaked at numbers four and one, respectively, on the equivalent of the "bubbling under" charts, registering songs just below the main charts.

== Music video ==
The three clones of Carey performing the song in a southern club

The accompanying music video for "Don't Stop (Funkin' 4 Jamaica)" was directed by Sanaa Hamri and filmed at the Maple Leaf Bar and a swamp outside New Orleans, Louisiana. The song's radio version was used in the video. The word "ass" was removed in the version. R!OT provided visual effects services for the video. Initially, the director planned to shoot the elements of Carey against green screen, but R!OT visual effects supervisor Eric Mises-Rosenfeld found that there was too little room to set up a screen behind the singer on the stage. Rosenfeld consulted with R!OT VFX production's compositing team in Santa Monica and together they came up with a solution, according to VFX's production coordinator Diana Young, who said: "They determined that a split screen technique could be used to produce the required plates while meeting the director's creative objectives". Chief among those objectives was making the trick look real. "The idea was to make it appear natural", explained HSI producer Steve Woroniecki. "We wanted something more than just three Mariahs on-stage, they needed to function like a real trio, interacting with one another - so that it wouldn't be easy to see how it was done".

Mises-Rosenfeld played a key role in accomplishing that goal, advising Hamri on what could and could not be done and concocting clever ways to make the three singers appear to be part of the same environment. R!OT's compositing team, consisting of lead compositor Claus Hansen assisted by Stefano Trivelli and Verdi Sevenhuysen, cemented the effect joining the three images together seamlessly and layering them over a background scene that included fans sitting at tables behind the stage. At one point, an extra crosses the frame between the camera and the back-up trio. According to Woroniecki, "That was one of the things that we thought would make the shot feel real. It took very careful work from the compositors to prepare all of the layers and adjust the lighting and shadows to make it work, but in the end it looks seamless. It's perfect".

The music video premiered on MTV's Total Request Live (TRL) on October 18, 2001. It is set in a nightclub with Mystikal on stage performing for an enthusiastic crowd, featuring southern bayous and various lifestyles. Also on stage there is a trio of back-up singers, all played by Carey. The trio, grouped around a microphone, are not exact duplicates as each Carey wears a different wardrobe and hairstyle. They also behave differently, playing off one another's performance. At one point the two singers on the outside, stop to stare at the singer in the middle as she reaches a high note. Emmanuel Hapsis from KQED included the video on his list of "All 64 Mariah Carey Music Videos, Ranked from Best to Worst", highlighting the fact that Carey's ego "got so big" that it turned into three.

== Formats and track listings ==
Benelux 2-track CD single

1. "Never Too Far" (Edit) - 3:56
2. "Don't Stop (Funkin' 4 Jamaica)" (featuring Mystikal) - 3:37

Australian, European and Malaysian CD maxi-single

1. "Never Too Far" (Edit) - 3:56
2. "Don't Stop (Funkin' 4 Jamaica)" (featuring Mystikal) - 3:37
3. "Loverboy" (Drums of Love) - 6:36
4. "Never Too Far" (Video) - 2:56

European cassette single

1. "Never Too Far" (Edit) - 3:56
2. "Don't Stop (Funkin' 4 Jamaica)" (featuring Mystikal) - 3:37
3. "Loverboy" (MJ Cole London Dub Mix) - 6:04

European 12-inch vinyl single

1. "Don't Stop (Funkin' 4 Jamaica)" (featuring Mystikal) - 3:37
2. "Don't Stop (Funkin' 4 Jamaica)" (featuring Mystikal) (Instrumental) - 3:37
3. "Never Too Far" - 4:22

== Credits and personnel ==
Credits adapted from liner notes of the CD single.

- Mariah Carey – lead vocals, backing vocals, songwriter, producer, executive producer
- DJ Clue – songwriter, producer, backing vocals, instrumentation
- Duro – songwriter, producer, instrumentation, recording
- Mystikal – rap, songwriter
- Tom Browne – songwriter
- Toni Smith – songwriter
- Dana Jon Chappelle – recording, mixing
- Florian Ammon – mixing
- Michael Schlesinger – mixing
- Andrew Fulless – recording supervisor

== Charts ==
| Chart (2001) (Note: "Don't Stop (Funkin' 4 Jamaica)" charted as a double A-side single with "Never Too Far" everywhere except the US and the UK Urban Club chart.) | Peak position |
|---|---|
| Australia (ARIA) | 36 |
| Belgium (Ultratip Bubbling Under Flanders) | 4 |
| Belgium (Ultratip Bubbling Under Wallonia) | 1 |
| Italy (FIMI) | 22 |
| Netherlands (Single Top 100) | 67 |
| Scottish Singles Sales (Official Charts) | 51 |
| Spain (PROMUSICAE) | 16 |
| Switzerland (Schweizer Hitparade) | 65 |
| UK Singles (Official Charts) | 32 |
| UK Dance (Official Charts) | 18 |
| UK Hip Hop/R&B (Official Charts) | 6 |
| UK Urban Club (Music Week) | 2 |
| US Bubbling Under Hot 100 Singles (Billboard) | 23 |
| US CHR/Rhythmic (Radio & Records) | 50 |
| US Hot R&B/Hip-Hop Songs (Billboard) | 42 |
| US Urban (Radio & Records) | 29 |

== Release history ==
Release dates and formats for "Don't Stop (Funkin' 4 Jamaica)"
| Region | Date | Format(s) | Label(s) | Ref. |
|---|---|---|---|---|
| United States | September 11, 2001 | Rhythmic contemporary radio | Virgin | |
| France | September 25, 2001 | Maxi CD | EMI | |
| United States | October 23, 2001 | Maxi CD | Virgin | |
| Australia | November 5, 2001 | Maxi CD | EMI | |
| United Kingdom | December 17, 2001 | 12-inch vinyl; cassette; maxi CD | Virgin | |
