= America: A Tribute to Heroes =

Benefit concert that raised money for victims of 9/11 attacks

Live album by Various artists
- Released: December 4, 2001
- Recorded: September 21, 2001
- Genres: Rock; pop
- Length: 91:18
- Label: Interscope

Various artists chronology
The Concert for New York City (2001)	America: A Tribute to Heroes (2001)	United We Stand: What More Can I Give (2001)

America: A Tribute to Heroes was a benefit concert created by the heads of the four major American broadcast networks; ABC, CBS, Fox and NBC. Joel Gallen was selected by them to produce and run the show. Actor George Clooney organized celebrities to perform and to staff the telephone bank.

It was broadcast live by each of the four networks, as well as over thirty other networks, in the aftermath of the September 11 attacks on the United States in 2001. Done in the style of a telethon, it featured a number of national and international entertainers performing to raise money for the victims and their families, particularly the New York City firefighters and New York City police officers. It aired September 21, 2001, uninterrupted and commercial-free, for which it won a Peabody Award. It was released on December 4, 2001, on compact disc and DVD.

On a dark stage illuminated by hundreds of candles, twenty-one artists performed songs of mourning and hope, while various actors and other celebrities delivered short spoken messages. The musical performances took place at three studios in Los Angeles (CBS Television City), New York, and London, while the celebrity messages took place in Los Angeles. Some of the musicians, including Neil Young and Eddie Vedder, were heard working the phone banks taking pledges. Over $200 million was raised and given to the United Way's September 11 Telethon Fund.

In 2004, Rolling Stone magazine selected this concert, along with the Concert for New York City, as one of the 50 moments that changed rock and roll. The show was also simulcast in Canada.

== Performers ==
- Bruce Springsteen: "My City of Ruins", a song he had performed at only a few New Jersey shows. Written before the September 11 attacks, it is actually about his home town Asbury Park, New Jersey; with a few phrases slightly modified, and introduced as "a prayer for our fallen brothers and sisters." It appeared on his The Rising album the following year.
- Stevie Wonder with Take 6: "Love's in Need of Love Today", from his 1976 album Songs in the Key of Life.
- U2 with Dave Stewart, Natalie Imbruglia and Morleigh Steinberg: "Peace on Earth" (intro)/"Walk On", both from their 2000 album All That You Can't Leave Behind. This performance was beamed via satellite from London.
- Faith Hill: "There Will Come a Day", from her 1999 album Breathe. For this performance, Hill was joined by a gospel choir and special guest Paul Shaffer on keyboards.
- Tom Petty and the Heartbreakers: "I Won't Back Down", from Petty's 1989 solo album Full Moon Fever.
- Enrique Iglesias: "Hero", which had just been released as his new single.
- Neil Young: John Lennon's "Imagine", which Young never recorded previously.
- Alicia Keys: Donny Hathaway's "Someday We'll All Be Free", which Keys never recorded previously.
- Goo Goo Dolls' John Rzeznik and Limp Bizkit's Fred Durst and Wes Borland: Pink Floyd's "Wish You Were Here", with some new lyrics written for the occasion. Neither the Goo Goo Dolls nor Limp Bizkit recorded the song previously.
- Billy Joel: "New York State of Mind", from his 1976 album Turnstiles.
- Dixie Chicks: "I Believe In Love", a new song which appeared on their Home album the following year.
- Dave Matthews: Solo performance of "Everyday", from the 2001 Dave Matthews Band album Everyday.
- Wyclef Jean: Bob Marley and The Wailers' "Redemption Song", which Jean never recorded previously.
- Mariah Carey: "Hero", from her 1993 album Music Box.
- Jon Bon Jovi and Richie Sambora of Bon Jovi: "Livin' on a Prayer", from their 1986 album Slippery When Wet. It was performed as an acoustic version, with two guitars, percussion and a violin.
- Sheryl Crow: "Safe and Sound", a new song which appeared on her C'mon, C'mon album the following year.
- Sting: "Fragile", from his 1987 album ...Nothing Like the Sun.
- Pearl Jam's Eddie Vedder and Mike McCready with Neil Young: "Long Road", a song originally appearing on Pearl Jam's Merkin Ball EP in 1995.
- Paul Simon: "Bridge Over Troubled Water", from the 1970 Simon & Garfunkel album Bridge Over Troubled Water.
- Céline Dion: "God Bless America" (as arranged by David Foster).
- Willie Nelson accompanied by the entire Los Angeles–based ensemble: "America the Beautiful".

== Speakers ==
- Tom Hanks
- George Clooney
- Will Smith
- Muhammad Ali
- Kelsey Grammer
- Jim Carrey
- Cameron Diaz
- Robin Williams
- Dennis Franz
- Jimmy Smits
- Calista Flockhart
- Amy Brenneman
- Conan O'Brien
- Sarah Jessica Parker
- Tom Cruise
- Ray Romano
- Lucy Liu
- Sela Ward
- Jane Kaczmarek
- Julia Roberts
- Chris Rock
- Robert De Niro
- Clint Eastwood

== Broadcasters ==
Over 35 network and cable outlets simultaneously broadcast America: A Tribute to Heroes, including: ABC, CBS, Fox, NBC, A&E, BET, Country Music Television, Comedy Central, Court TV, Discovery Channel, E!, ESPN, Fox Family, Fox Sports Net, FX, Galavision, Hallmark Channel, HBO, Lifetime, MTV, Oxygen, PAX, PBS, Sci-Fi, Showtime, Sundance Channel, Telemundo, TLC, TNN, TNT, The WB, Turner South, Univision, UPN, USA Network, and VH1.

America: A Tribute to Heroes was simulcast on the Internet at www.tributetoheroes.org and at America Online, as well as on more than 8,000 radio outlets around the country, including Westwood One, Clear Channel Communications and ABC Radio affiliates in major markets.

Internationally, America: A Tribute to Heroes was distributed to broadcasters in more than 210 countries around the world including BBC One in the United Kingdom. Further, the American Forces Network carried the program live on radio and television to American soldiers, sailors, airmen and marines in over 175 countries around the world. In the United States alone, it was estimated to have been watched by 60 million people.

== Charts ==
=== Weekly charts ===
Chart (2001)	Peak position
US Billboard 200	17

=== Year-end charts ===
Chart (2002)	Position
US Billboard 200	120

== See also ==
- List of highest-grossing benefit concerts
- We Are The World
- The Concert for New York City
- United We Stand: What More Can I Give
- Hope for Haiti Now: A Global Benefit for Earthquake Relief
