= Fantasy: Mariah Carey at Madison Square Garden =

Video by Mariah Carey
- Released: March 4, 1996 (VHS); March 4, 1996 (Laserdisc); November 16, 2004 (DVD)
- Recorded: October 10, 1995
- Venue: Madison Square Garden (New York City)
- Genre: R&B; dance; soul
- Length: 59:00
- Label: Columbia
- Director: Larry Jordan
- Producer: Mariah Carey; Jack Gulick; Randy Hoffman; Al Smith

Mariah Carey chronology
Here Is Mariah Carey (1993)	Fantasy: Mariah Carey at Madison Square Garden (1996)	Around the World (1999)

Fantasy: Mariah Carey at Madison Square Garden is Mariah Carey's fourth DVD/home video release. It presents Carey performing live at the Madison Square Garden on October 10, 1995. The home video was originally released in early 1996, and the DVD was released in late 2004. It was distributed by Columbia Pictures.

Originally shown as a television special on November 29, 1995, on Fox, the video presented Carey performing a concert to celebrate and promote her fifth studio album, Daydream, and to help prepare her and her crew for her 1996 Daydream World Tour. Carey performed five songs from Daydream—"Fantasy", "One Sweet Day", "Always Be My Baby", "Open Arms", and "Forever"—in addition to six of her older hits: "Vision of Love", "Make It Happen", "I'll Be There", "Dreamlover", "Hero", and "Without You".

The concert featured a number of guest stars. Boyz II Men performed "One Sweet Day" with Carey, and Wanya Morris of Boyz II Men also performed "I'll Be There" with her. Although he did not perform with Carey, Ol' Dirty Bastard came out and rapped some of his lines to the Bad Boy Remix of "Fantasy".

The video release comes with two bonus music videos of "One Sweet Day" and the C&C Video Edit of "Anytime You Need a Friend". Performances of "Vision of Love," "Make It Happen," "Fantasy," and "One Sweet Day" from this concert would later be compiled into audio release as official live versions on commercial/promo singles.

Fantasy: Mariah Carey at Madison Square Garden was re-released in 2008 as part of Mariah Carey: DVD Collection, a 2 DVD set released in Europe (PAL) and Asia (NTSC) also including #1's.

The video is presented in a slightly altered version, omitting Carey's introduction of her band members preceding "Vision of Love," segments of the outro that featured Ol' Dirty Bastard, segments of her waving to the crowd at the conclusion of the concert, and the credit of "Joy to the World – From St. John the Divine", as that performance was not included on the VHS or DVD version of this release (but originally aired on the FOX special.)

It was released for digital download on the iTunes Store on December 7, 2021.

== Track listing ==
Track lengths adapted from Sony Music Store.

Fantasy: Mariah Carey At Madison Square Garden
No.	Title	Writer(s)	Length
1.	"Fantasy"	Mariah Carey; Dave Hall; Chris Frantz; Tina Weymouth; Adrian Belew; Steven Stanley	4:06
2.	"Make It Happen"	Carey; Robert Clivillés; David Cole	4:54
3.	"Open Arms"	Steve Perry; Jonathan Cain	3:44
4.	"Dreamlover"	Carey; Hall	3:59
5.	"Without You"		4:01
6.	"One Sweet Day" (with Boyz II Men)	Carey; Walter Afanasieff; Michael McCary; Nathan Morris; Wanya Morris; Shawn Stockman
7.	"I'll Be There" (with Wanya Morris)	Berry Gordy; Bob West; Hal Davis; Willie Hutch	4:19
8.	"Hero"	Carey; Afanasieff	4:22
9.	"Always Be My Baby"	Carey; Jermaine Dupri; Manuel Seal	3:54
10.	"Forever"	Carey; Afanasieff	4:02
11.	"Vision of Love"	Carey; Ben Margulies	4:03

Bonus Videos
No.	Title	Director(s)	Length
12.	"One Sweet Day" (with Boyz II Men)	Larry Jordan	4:41
13.	"Anytime You Need a Friend" (dance version)	Danielle Federici

== Chart performance ==
Chart	Peak position	Certification	Sales
French Music DVD Chart	1	Gold	10,000
U.S. Billboard Top Music Video	1	Platinum	100,000
