= Daydream (Mariah Carey album) =

1995 studio album by Mariah Carey

Studio album by Mariah Carey
- Released: September 26, 1995
- Recorded: November 1994 – August 1995
- Studios: DMH (New York City); The Hit Factory (New York City); Wallyworld (San Rafael); Crave (New York City); Sony Music (New York City); Quad (New York City)
- Genres: Pop; R&B
- Length: 46:42
- Label: Columbia
- Producers: Mariah Carey; Walter Afanasieff; Dave Hall; Jermaine Dupri; Manuel Seal; David Morales

Mariah Carey chronology
Merry Christmas (1994)	Daydream (1995)	Butterfly (1997)

Singles from Daydream
- 1. "Fantasy" Released: August 23, 1995; 2. "One Sweet Day" Released: November 13, 1995; 3. "Open Arms" Released: February 5, 1996; 4. "Always Be My Baby" Released: February 20, 1996; 5. "Forever" Released: June 18, 1996

Daydream is the fifth studio album by American singer-songwriter Mariah Carey. It was released on September 26, 1995, by Columbia Records. The follow-up to her internationally successful studio album Music Box (1993) and the holiday release Merry Christmas (1994), Daydream differed from her earlier works by incorporating stronger elements of urban music.

Carey composed Daydream with producers and songwriters such as Walter Afanasieff, Dave Hall, Boyz II Men, Jermaine Dupri, Manuel Seal, and Kenneth "Babyface" Edmonds. The album helped the singer make a subtle transition into the contemporary R&B market after having previously pursued pop, adult contemporary, and traditional rhythm and blues. The album marked the beginning of her musical and vocal transition toward hip-hop—a change that would become more evident on her sixth studio album, Butterfly (1997). During its production, she endured numerous creative conflicts with her label and her then-husband, Tommy Mottola. Daydream's songs explore fantasy, isolation, and romantic vulnerability.

Carey promoted the album with the Daydream World Tour (1996) and five singles, three of which reached number one on the US Billboard Hot 100: "Fantasy", "One Sweet Day", and "Always Be My Baby". "Fantasy" became the first song by a woman to debut atop the chart, while "One Sweet Day" spent sixteen weeks at the top, holding the record for the longest-running number-one single in Billboard Hot 100 history for twenty-three years. Daydream topped the charts in ten countries, including Australia, Germany, Japan, the Netherlands, New Zealand, the United Kingdom, and the United States. In the United States, it spent six weeks atop the Billboard 200 and has been certified 11× platinum by the Recording Industry Association of America.

Upon release, Daydream received widespread critical acclaim, particularly for its production, sonic quality, and Carey's musical progression; many reviewers regarded it as her best album to date. At the 38th Annual Grammy Awards, the album and its songs received six nominations, including Album of the Year. Retrospectively, Daydream has been acclaimed as one of Carey's finest works; critics have deemed it a transitional project that represented the singer's shift toward R&B and hip-hop while also influencing subsequent pop and cross-genre collaborations. It is one of the best-selling albums of all time, with over 20 million copies sold worldwide.

== Background ==
American singer-songwriter Mariah Carey released her third studio album, Music Box, in August 1993. It is primarily a pop and contemporary R&B album consisting mostly of ballads. Music Box was immensely successful, spending eight non-consecutive weeks atop the US Billboard 200 and becoming the second best-selling album of 1994. It spawned the chart-topping singles "Dreamlover", "Hero", and "Without You", and eventually became her best-selling album. Despite its commercial success, Music Box received mixed reviews, with critics finding it lacking in emotional depth and substance.

With Music Box, Carey had begun scaling back the heavier gospel and soul influences of her earlier albums Mariah Carey (1990) and Emotions (1991), a shift journalist Chris Nickson attributed to her desire to evolve gradually as an artist. She released her fourth studio album and first holiday album, Merry Christmas, in October 1994. It was globally successful, selling 18 million copies worldwide and yielding the Christmas standard "All I Want for Christmas Is You". By the time Merry Christmas was released, Carey told Billboard that she had already written seven songs for her forthcoming fifth studio album.

== Development ==
What I tried to do is to put [a higher vocal register] as more of a texture on a lot of songs, like as a background part I did certain things, and you know I just meant to get a little more creative with it.

— Carey, in an interview with MTV, on her styling on Daydream

Carey began recording Daydream in late 1994; its development process represented a major shift in her artistic direction. She sought greater creative control over her work and increasingly pursued the R&B and hip-hop influences she had long admired. She later described the album as her most personal work at the time, explaining that she had become more confident in expressing her musical instincts after previously feeling "insecure and cautious" and following label expectations. While recording the album, Carey worked quickly and intensely, telling Time that she entered "this phase of recording, recording, recording", while focusing more deliberately on what she wanted artistically.

Carey's changing musical direction created conflicts with Columbia Records, which had previously cultivated her image around adult contemporary ballads and mainstream pop. Executives became particularly concerned after Carey enlisted Ol' Dirty Bastard for the remix of "Fantasy", fearing the collaboration was a drastic stylistic shift that could alienate her audience. Carey recalled that label executives were nervous about "breaking the formula" that fueled her commercial success. The inclusion of hip-hop influences throughout the album further strained Carey's marriage to Tommy Mottola, who closely oversaw her career as head of Sony Music. Despite her growing interest in hip-hop and R&B, Mottola preferred that Carey continue recording polished pop ballads. As Carey obtained more authority over the sound and direction of Daydream, her marriage to Mottola continued to deteriorate.

During the recording process, Carey also secretly worked on the alternative rock project Someone's Ugly Daughter by the band Chick. She contributed songwriting, production, vocals, and art direction, although Columbia refused to release the project featuring her lead vocals. Her friend Clarissa Dane was ultimately brought in as the public face of the band, with her vocals layered over Carey’s recordings to obscure her voice. Carey later explained that she enjoyed experimenting with the "breezy-grunge, punk-light" style popular during the period, describing the sessions as an alter ego separate from the more polished sound of Daydream.

=== Writing and recording ===
Carey co-produced Daydream with Walter Afanasieff, Dave Hall, Jermaine Dupri, Manuel Seal, and David Morales. The first song recorded for the album was "Underneath the Stars", which Carey described as "a good place to start", as it helped orient her toward a more R&B-driven direction and a sound influenced by Minnie Riperton, one of her longstanding inspirations. Nickson observed that, in contrast to Riperton's songs, "Underneath the Stars" makes limited use of her higher vocal register. As Carey began developing material for Daydream, she heard Tom Tom Club's 1981 single "Genius of Love" on the radio—a song she had long admired—and proposed sampling its hook to Hall. Hall created a groove he felt complemented her voice, while Carey contributed to the beat production and wrote the lyrics, resulting in "Fantasy". She also recorded a remix featuring verses by Ol' Dirty Bastard, with additional production by Sean "Puffy" Combs.

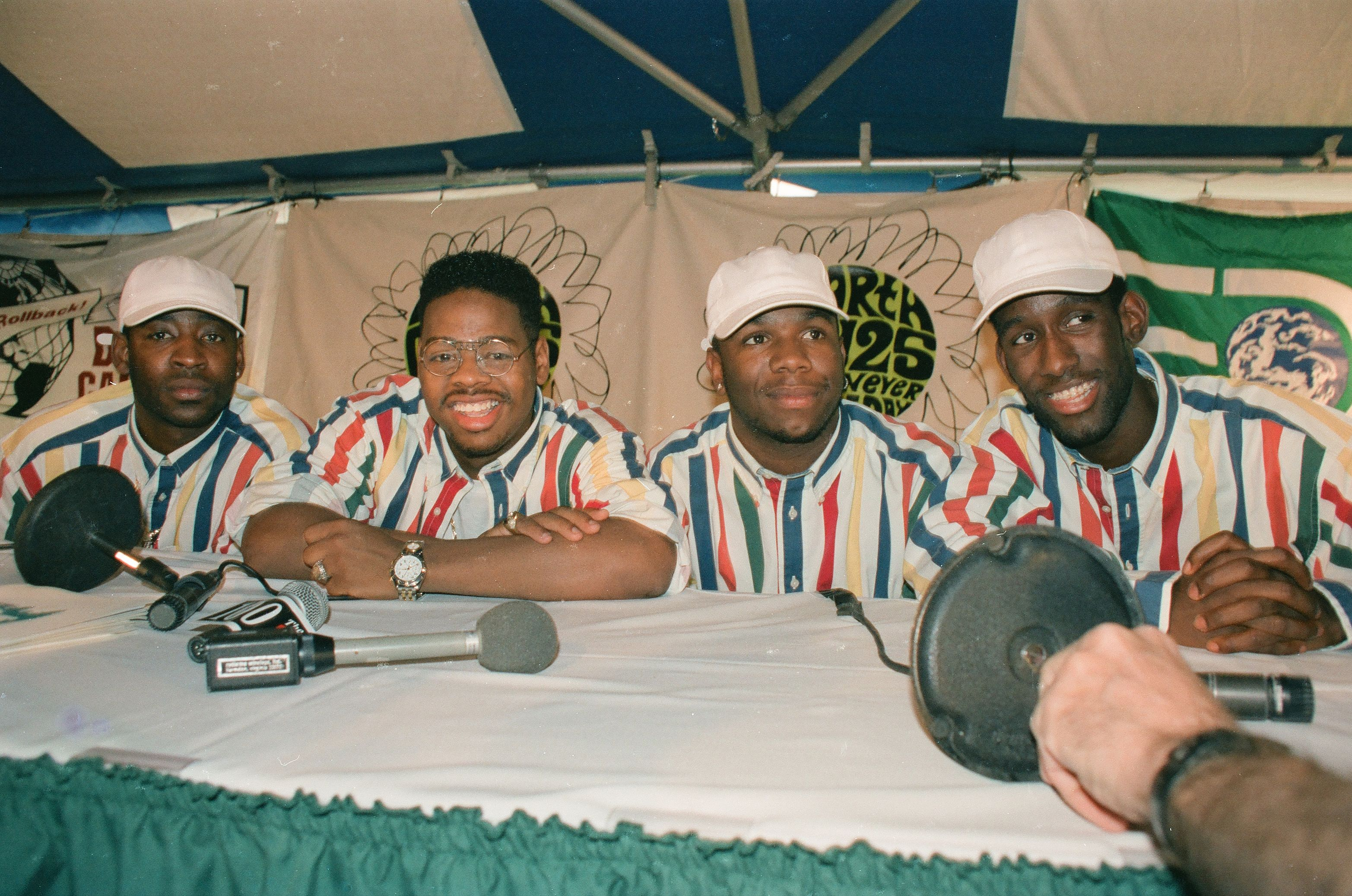
Boyz II Men in 1995, the same year they collaborated with Carey on "One Sweet Day"

Following the death of her friend and former collaborator David Cole, Carey conceived "One Sweet Day" as a tribute to him and to the loved ones her fans had lost; as an admirer of their work, she enlisted R&B group Boyz II Men to collaborate on the track. Carey had already composed the chorus and developed the concept, and after meeting with Boyz II Men, they found they had been working on a similar idea. Using Carey's chorus and concept alongside the melody created by the group, they wrote and composed the song together. The track was produced by Afanasieff, who expanded on the melody and incorporated additional grooves and beats. Carey had been a fan of Dupri since the release of Kris Kross's 1992 single "Jump" and later expressed interest in working with him.

Soon after, Carey, Dupri, and Seal began writing a song for the album. While Seal played piano and Dupri programmed the drums, Carey improvised over the melody until she developed the chorus for "Always Be My Baby". After the rest of the song was completed, she recorded it with background vocals from Kelly Price, Shanrae Price, and Melonie Daniels. The vocalists created a "wall of background voices" beneath her final belting notes. Daydream marked the beginning of a long-term professional partnership between Carey and Dupri that continued through her fourteenth studio album, Me. I Am Mariah... The Elusive Chanteuse (2014). For the album, Carey covered Journey's 1981 song "Open Arms" at her own suggestion. Working with Afanasieff, she softened the arrangement and gave it a polished feel, especially in contrast to the more heartfelt "One Sweet Day". Backed by the vocals of the Price sisters and Daniels, she also gave the track a gospel influence.

"I Am Free", one of the album’s most gospel-influenced tracks, was a collaboration between Carey, Afanasieff, and Loris Holland, all of whom had previously worked together on Merry Christmas. During the creative process, Carey improvised the melody over written lyrics while Holland provided organ accompaniment and Afanasieff handled the programming, resulting in what Nickson described as a "genuine and unforced" sound. While Carey increasingly incorporated R&B influences into Daydream, she continued to honor the style of her earlier work, co-writing the power ballad "When I Saw You" with Afanasieff. She also returned to R&B and hip-hop with "Long Ago", her second collaboration with Dupri and Seal. "Melt Away", which she co-wrote with Kenneth "Babyface" Edmonds, was the only song on Daydream that Carey produced entirely on her own, while "Looking In" was written in roughly fifteen minutes.

== Composition ==
Daydream is primarily a pop and R&B album that incorporates elements of hip-hop, gospel, and adult contemporary. It marked a departure from the image established by her earlier releases, such as Music Box, which sought ballad-driven songs; Daydream instead incorporated stronger urban contemporary influences. While still featuring ballads—such as "One Sweet Day" and "Open Arms"—reminiscent of her older work, the album adopted a leaner sound that aligned it more closely with contemporary R&B. Pitchfork wrote that the album expanded the boundaries of Carey's sound, blending genres and styles that had previously been treated as separate. Nickson noted that Daydream adopted a sound that felt more "contemporary than classic", broadening its appeal without alienating fans of her traditional style.

The album opens with "Fantasy", whose lyrics depict a woman in love with a man, lost in vivid daydreams of an unattainable romance each time she encounters him. It is an upbeat R&B and dance-pop song that features elements of funk, hip-hop, and bubblegum pop. The song is built upon funky basslines, gangsta funk synthesizers, and airy background harmonies, with Carey's lead vocal layered over a soft bed of densely multi-tracked backing vocals. Due to its sample of "Genius of Love", all members of Tom Tom Club—Tina Weymouth, Chris Frantz, Steven Stanley, and Adrian Belew—are credited as songwriters on "Fantasy". "Underneath the Stars" draws on soul influences and incorporates synthetic record scratches to evoke an authentic, aged sound. Sung over a Rhodes piano, the song reminisces about a tender young love that faded away, spent lying with her lover under a warm summer night.

The third track, "One Sweet Day", is a duet with Boyz II Men. It has been described as an R&B ballad and slow jam built around a sturdy chorus that allowed the singers to make intricate vocal runs and layered harmonies. Its instrumentation includes keyboards, synthesizers, a synth bass, and guitar. Lyrically, "One Sweet Day" is about grieving the loss of a loved one and holding onto the hope of reuniting in heaven. "Open Arms", a power ballad, covers Journey's 1981 song and is the only track on Daydream that Carey did not write. She described her version as her own interpretation of the song. Described by critics as both a love song and breakup song, "Always Be My Baby" portrays the lingering attachment Carey feels toward a former lover, while confidently asserting that their reunion is inevitable. It is a midtempo ballad whose instrumentation consists of piano keyboards, drums, and acoustic guitars.

Daydream's sixth track, "I Am Free", is a pop and gospel ballad that critics described as overblown. Its dense vocal layering was likened by Pitchfork to a "mini-Mariah choir", while Nickson noted that it signaled Carey's shift away from "standard" ballads, edging closer in style to Toni Braxton than Celine Dion; however, she did not abandon the traditional form entirely, as evidenced by the album's seventh track, "When I Saw You". The ballad lyrically explores love at first sight and features Carey's melismatic belting, with Nickson writing that it served as a reminder of "how powerful her voice could be". "Long Ago" is an R&B and hip-hop song about a lost love and reflections on a past relationship. It shares elements with "Always Be My Baby", including moments of Carey singing alone over piano chords, though "Long Ago" features a more "rugged" beat.

The ninth track on Daydream, "Melt Away", is a slow jam that sees Carey use a sultry lower register; it features background vocals from co-writer Babyface. It is a love song about romantic surrender. The next track, "Forever", draws on 1950s and 1960s American music as a doo-wop-influenced rock and roll ballad styled as a waltz. Its soundscape features keyboards, guitars, and programming. "Daydream Interlude" (Sweet Fantasy Dub Mix), the album's eleventh track, reworks "Fantasy" into a club-oriented house remix by producer David Morales. The album closes with "Looking In", an introspective soul ballad portraying Carey as an isolated, misunderstood diva grappling with youthful fears, insecurity, her childhood, and her tumultuous marriage to Mottola.

== Promotion and release ==
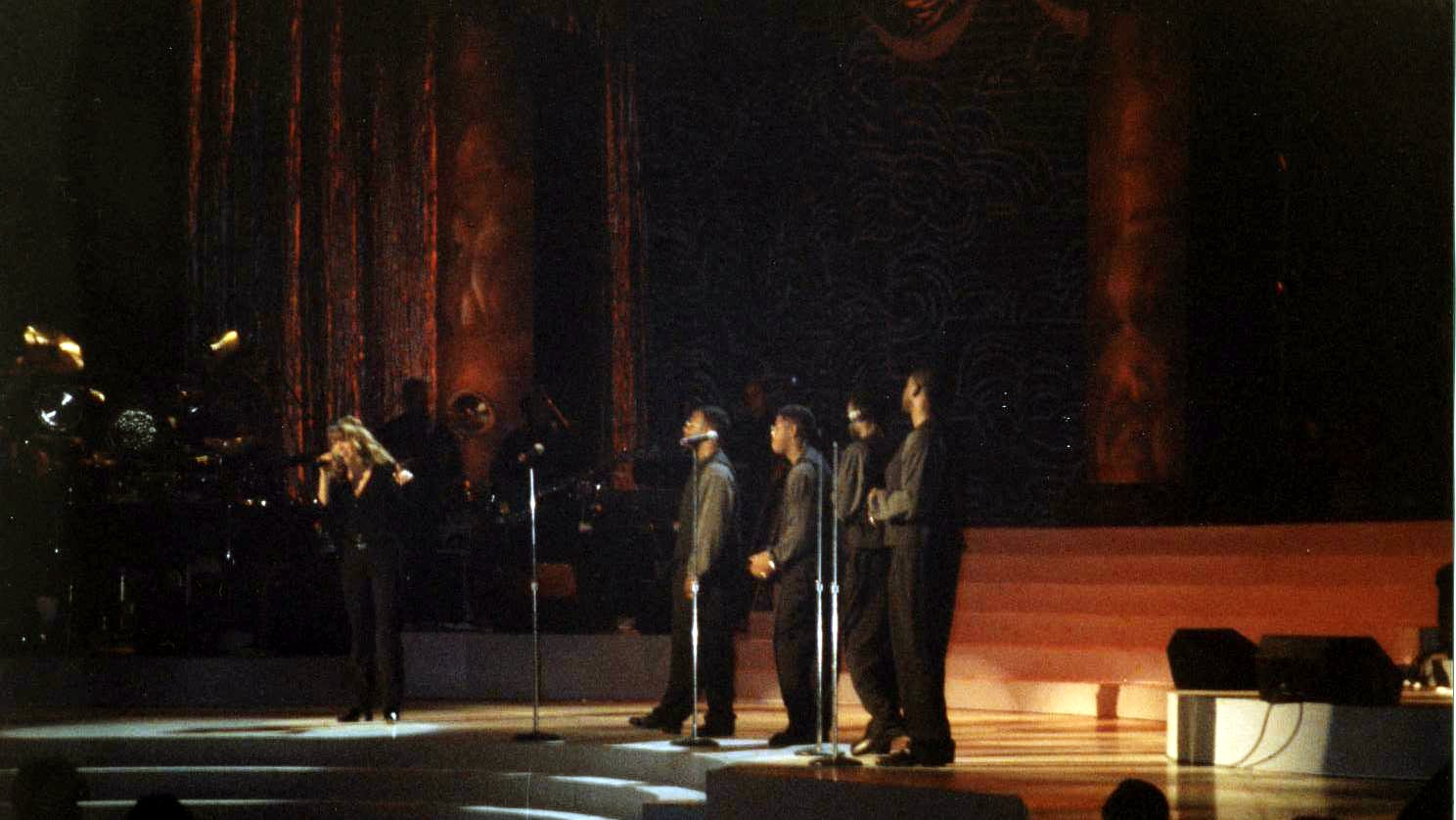
Carey and Boyz II Men performing "One Sweet Day" at Madison Square Garden

Daydream was released in late 1995 across various global regions: Taiwan on September 26, Europe on September 28, Japan on September 30, Hong Kong on October 2, and the United States on October 3. To promote the album, Carey launched her second headlining tour, the Daydream World Tour. The tour included Japan and several European countries, with shows spaced out to allow Carey time to rest her voice. Before the 1996 world tour, she performed a sold-out concert at Madison Square Garden in 1995. That performance was recorded and later released as Fantasy: Mariah Carey at Madison Square Garden, her fourth video release.

For the seven-show tour, Carey performed fourteen original songs, including many of her biggest hits at the time and several tracks from Daydream. These included "Fantasy", "One Sweet Day", "Open Arms", "Always Be My Baby", "Forever", and "Underneath the Stars", along with songs from her earlier albums. Her later shows in France, Germany, the Netherlands, and the United Kingdom were also sold out and received positive reviews. Carey also promoted the album through television appearances and award-show performances. After "Fantasy" was released across Europe in September, she performed it on Britain's Top of the Pops, which was also broadcast live to viewers on Asian television. "One Sweet Day" was performed at the 38th Annual Grammy Awards and at Princess Diana's memorial service in September 1997. She also performed "Open Arms" on programs such as Top of the Pops in the United Kingdom.

Two additional tracks from the Daydream sessions were later released on the compilation album The Rarities (2020). "Slipping Away"—another Dave Hall collaboration—served as the B-side to "Always Be My Baby", while "One Night" was written with Jermaine Dupri. On July 17, 2026, Carey released a thirtieth-anniversary edition of Daydream on streaming platforms. The expanded release includes fan favorites, live performances, and remixes. It is scheduled for physical release on October 16 as a triple LP, two-CD set, and cassette. The vinyl edition will also include Carey's 1995 live concert at Madison Square Garden and previously unreleased tracks, while the CD set features previously unreleased recordings of "Always Be My Baby" and "Open Arms" from the Daydream World Tour performance in Rotterdam, Netherlands, on June 17, 1996.

=== Singles ===
Daydream was promoted with five singles. Columbia Records released "Fantasy" as the album's lead single on August 23, 1995. On the US Billboard Hot 100, it entered at number one, making "Fantasy" the first song by a woman to debut atop the chart, and the second overall following "You Are Not Alone" by Michael Jackson. It achieved this feat via strong airplay, popularity among radio listeners, and initial sales of 229,000 copies—the highest single-week sales of a song since Whitney Houston's "I Will Always Love You" (1993). The song became Carey's ninth number-one single and spent eight consecutive weeks atop the Billboard Hot 100. In the US, "Fantasy" was the second best-selling single of 1995, with sales of over 1.5 million; it has since been certified octuple platinum by the Recording Industry Association of America (RIAA), denoting shipments of over eight million copies in the US. Outside the US, "Fantasy" topped the charts in Australia, Canada, and New Zealand, and reached the top five in Belgium, Finland, France, and the UK. It was nominated for Best Female Pop Vocal Performance at the 38th Annual Grammy Awards.

"One Sweet Day" was released as the album's second single on November 14, 1995, in the US. It also debuted at number one on the Billboard Hot 100, making Carey the first artist to have multiple songs debut at number one; "One Sweet Day" also became the fourth song to debut atop the chart. The song spent sixteen consecutive weeks at number one on the chart, making it the longest-running number-one song in Billboard Hot 100 history; it retained the record for twenty-three years. It ranked atop Billboard's decade-end Hot 100 chart as the most successful song of the 1990s, a distinction Carey would achieve again in the 2000s with "We Belong Together" (2005). It has since been certified quadruple platinum by the RIAA, denoting shipments of over four million copies in the US. Elsewhere, "One Sweet Day" topped the charts in Canada and New Zealand, and reached the top five in Australia, France, the Netherlands, Ireland, and Denmark. At the Grammy Awards, the song was nominated for two awards: Record of the Year and Best Pop Collaboration with Vocals.

"Open Arms" was released to radio in the United Kingdom as Daydream's third single in February 1996. It achieved moderate commercial success, reaching the top ten of charts in the UK, New Zealand, and Ireland, and the top twenty in Scotland and the Netherlands. "Always Be My Baby" was released to radio on February 27, 1996, as the album's third single in the US, and the fourth single worldwide. It debuted at number two on the Billboard Hot 100, blocked by Celine Dion's "Because You Loved Me". The following week, "Always Be My Baby" replaced "Because You Loved Me" at the top, giving Carey her eleventh number-one single on the chart and spending two weeks there. The song has been certified septuple platinum by the RIAA, denoting shipments of over seven million copies in the US. It also topped the charts in Canada and reached the top five in the UK and New Zealand. "Always Be My Baby" was nominated for the Grammy Award for Best Female R&B Vocal Performance.

"Forever" was released for airplay on June 18, 1996, promoted as the album's fifth single. It reached number nine on the Hot 100 Airplay and number eleven on the RPM airplay chart in Canada. "Underneath the Stars" was released as a promotional single from Daydream on November 19, 1996. Due to its limited release, it failed to make an impact on the major charts, though it peaked at number sixty-nine on the R&B/Hip-Hop Airplay.

== Critical reception ==
Professional ratings
Review scores
Source	Rating
AllMusic	5/5 stars
BusinessWorld	B+
Encyclopedia of Popular Music	4/5 stars
Entertainment Weekly	B
Los Angeles Times	3/4 stars
Music & Media	Positive
Pitchfork	7.9/10
The Rolling Stone Album Guide	3/5 stars
Smash Hits	2/5 stars
Sputnikmusic	4.5/5 stars

Daydream received critical acclaim upon release. Music critics praised Carey's vocal evolution, noting how she adapted her vocal style to suit the album's more contemporary sound in contrast to her earlier work.

Stephen Holden of The New York Times wrote that Carey's songwriting had improved dramatically, "becoming more relaxed, sexier, and less reliant on thudding clichés". "One Sweet Day", "Melt Away", "Always Be My Baby", and "Underneath the Stars" were singled out as highlights, while "Fantasy" featured what Holden described as "some of the most gorgeously spun choral music to be found on a contemporary album". Los Angeles Times journalist Cheo H. Coker stated that Daydream boasted material that would silence Carey's critics—especially "Fantasy" and "Underneath the Stars"—and offered "something for everybody while somehow remaining true to her essence". People magazine deemed it Carey's best album, benefiting from "funkier and mellower" songs and the singer's improved control over her voice, "evincing greater muscularity and agility". According to Encyclopedia of Popular Music writer Colin Larkin, "some critics questioned whether Daydream was a controlled exercise in vacuous formula writing, with little emotion or heart." Reviewing the album for Entertainment Weekly, Ken Tucker preferred the "less dignified tunes"—particularly "Daydream Interlude" (Fantasy Sweet Dub Mix)—over the "monuments to assiduous good taste" in "When I Saw You" and "I Am Free", which he panned as overwrought ballads. Tucker nonetheless called it Carey's best album since her 1990 self-titled debut.

In a retrospective review for AllMusic, Stephen Thomas Erlewine called Daydream Carey's "best record to date, featuring a consistently strong selection of songs and a remarkably impassioned performance by Carey." In Erlewine's opinion, the album appealed to both urban R&B and adult contemporary audiences while showing that "Carey continues to perfect her craft, and that she has earned her status as an R&B/pop diva." In The Rolling Stone Album Guide (2004), Arion Berger said the album "adheres to the classic radio-friendly diva format, alternating between frisky dance tunes and overscaled ballads". He highlighted the songs contributed by Afanasieff while lamenting Carey's cover of "Open Arms".

=== Accolades ===
Publication	Accolade	Rank	Ref.
Complex	The Best R&B Albums of '90s	15	

== Commercial performance ==
In the United States, Daydream debuted at number one on the Billboard 200 with 224,000 copies sold. The album moved 760,000 copies during the Christmas week of 1995, marking the largest sales week by a solo female artist until Britney Spears's Oops!... I Did It Again in 2000. Daydream sold at least 90,000 copies per week in the seven months following its release. It was the second best-selling album of 1996, just behind Alanis Morissette's Jagged Little Pill, and the eighteenth best-selling album of the 1990s decade in the US. Daydream became Carey's best-selling album in the United States, selling 10.7 million units in the country (as of 2021) and earning an 11× Platinum certification from the Recording Industry Association of America (RIAA), representing sales and streams of over 11 million copies. The album spent six non-consecutive weeks at number one on the chart, including 29 weeks inside the top ten and 81 weeks overall.

In Canada, Daydream peaked at number two on the charts and was certified seven-times Platinum by the Canadian Recording Industry Association (CRIA). The album experienced success in Europe, where it reached number one in Germany, the Netherlands, Switzerland, and the United Kingdom. In France, Daydream peaked at number two and was certified double-Platinum by the Syndicat National de l'Édition Phonographique (SNEP). Daydream was certified triple-Platinum by the International Federation of the Phonographic Industry (IFPI), denoting shipments of three million copies throughout Europe in 1996.

In Australia, Daydream was certified five-times Platinum by the Australian Recording Industry Association (ARIA), denoting shipments of 350,000 copies. The album finished ninth on the ARIA End of Year Charts in both 1995 and 1996. In Japan, the album debuted at number one on the Oricon charts. According to Oricon, Daydream reached the top five best-selling albums in Japan by a non-Asian artist, with 2.2 million copies sold. Daydream remains one of the best-selling albums in history, with sales exceeding 20 million copies worldwide.

== Accolades ==
The music industry took note of Carey's success. She won two awards at the 1996 American Music Awards for her solo efforts: Favorite Pop/Rock Female Artist and Favorite Soul/R&B Female Artist. Throughout 1995 and 1996, Carey was honored with various prestigious awards at the World Music Awards, including World's Best Selling Female R&B Artist, World's Best Selling Overall Female Recording Artist, World's Best Selling Pop Artist, and World's Best Selling Overall Recording Artist. Additionally, "Fantasy" was named Song of the Year at the BMI Awards and Favorite Song at the Blockbuster Entertainment Awards, where Carey also won Top Pop Female. In 1996, Carey won multiple honors at the Billboard Music Awards, including Hot 100 Singles Artist of the Year, Hot 100 Airplay ("Always Be My Baby"), Hot Adult Contemporary Artist of the Year, and a Special Award for spending 16 weeks at number one with "One Sweet Day".

Pitchfork writer Jamieson Cox called the album, specifically "Underneath the Stars", a "tribute to '70s R&B legends like Minnie Riperton, complete with vinyl crackle". He went on to praise Carey's use of "flows [...] with the ease of someone with a genuine appreciation for hip-hop". Carey began a "seamless blend of pop and hip-hop" within this album, which eventually became the core of Butterfly and served as the foundation for her late-career reinvigoration nearly a decade later. Cox added that Daydream "wasn't just transitional in a musical sense [...] it was the beginning of the end for Mariah's innocence". In July 2017, the album ranked at number 97 on National Public Radio's list of the 150 greatest female albums of all time.

=== Grammy Awards controversy ===
What can you do? Let me put it this way. I will never be disappointed again. After sitting through that whole show and not winning once, I can so far handle anything. But-and I know everyone always says this-I wasn't expecting to win.

— Carey on her disappointment with the 1996 Grammy Awards outcome

Daydream proved to be one of the best-selling and most acclaimed albums of 1995. When the Grammy Award nominees were announced and Daydream was nominated for six awards, critics predicted that it would clean up that year. The 38th Annual Grammy Awards were held on February 28, 1996, at the Shrine Auditorium in Los Angeles. Carey, being a multiple award nominee, was one of the headlining performers at the ceremony. Together with Boyz II Men, she performed a live rendition of "One Sweet Day" to a very positive response. However, as the award winners were announced one by one, Carey watched as her name was not called a single time. Daydream lost all six of its nominations, shocking most critics who had branded it the favorite for Album of the Year. With every passing loss, the television cameras continued to zoom in on Carey's face, making it increasingly difficult for her to maintain her smile. By the end of the night, Carey had not won a single award. The disappointment on her face was "painfully obvious", according to media outlets. Carey did not perform again until the 2006 ceremony, when she was nominated for eight awards (winning three) for The Emancipation of Mimi.

== Legacy and influence ==
Daydream is regarded as one of Carey's best albums to date, and music critics often rank it highly within her discography. In 2025, Billboard staff ranked Daydream the third-best studio album of Carey's career, observing that it "symbolized the bridge between the two halves of Mariah’s catalog that decade, linking the earlier pop and adult contemporary sounds with the hip-hop and layered R&B inspirations that colored subsequent works". NPR ranked Daydream one of the 150 greatest albums helmed by women. UDiscoverMusic ranked it the 17th-best album of 1995, calling it "pure pop perfection". Andrew Chan, author and editor of Why Mariah Matters (2023), identified Daydream as a cultural moment, recalling that its chart-topping singles “Fantasy”, “One Sweet Day”, and “Always Be My Baby” were virtually inescapable for at least two years following the album's release. Troy L. Smith of Cleveland.com, who ranked the same three songs among the best of the 1990s, stated that "Fantasy" and Daydream helped Carey evolve out of her adult contemporary image. Music journalists agree that Daydream was a transitional album for Carey due to its genre-bending songs and collaborations, particularly the singer's foray into R&B and hip-hop music. Prior to Daydream, the singer had been known for releasing pop music that highlighted her vocal prowess. The album features several musical trademarks that would become staples of Carey's work: catchy hooks, emotional ballads, powerful vocals, and R&B influences. The singer also began changing her vocal style, adopting a softer, airier quality she would continue exploring on subsequent releases.

Princess Gabbara of Grammys.com noted that although 1997's Butterfly is typically cited as Carey's transition from pop singer to R&B and hip-hop artist, her true metamorphosis began with Daydream, as evidenced by collaborations with R&B artists Boyz II Men, Jermaine Dupri, and Babyface. The album also marked the beginning of Carey's working relationship with Dupri as a producer and songwriter. According to Kailyn Hayes of Hilltop Views, the album established "the tone for how a true MC song should sound" by allowing her to assert her independence for the first time in her career, which would only be cemented by its immediate successor, Butterfly. Carey would eventually feature hip-hop artists such as Bone Thugs-n-Harmony, Jay Z, and Snoop Dogg on subsequent projects. In addition to cementing Carey's "position as both a pop superstar and a formidable R&B vocalist", a writer for BlackAmericaWeb.com said the album's influence "continues to resonate as a benchmark for blending mainstream appeal with genuine artistry". Hayes credited Daydream with inspiring future pop acts such as Taylor Swift, Ariana Grande, and Ed Sheeran to pursue their own collaborations with rappers and hip-hop artists. The writer concluded, "The landscape of current music as we know it would be vastly different had it not been for Carey trailblazing a path that celebrates cross-genre genius", while Vibe writer Adelle Platon said Carey "etched the blueprint for modern-day pop melodies featuring rap verses", citing her influence on artists like Christina Aguilera and Beyoncé. According to Platon, Daydream graduated Carey from "Titanic-y ballad voice box to R&B&Pop queen".

Journalist Audie Cornish said Daydream's musical direction and success spared Carey from being relegated to "a glitter-laden version" of singer Whitney Houston. A writer for Slant Magazine reported that Carey had "arguably reached a new apex in her career" with Daydream due to its mainstream, mass pop appeal and "perfectly balanced" selection of songs. In a 2017 retrospective review, Jamieson Cox of Pitchfork said Daydream symbolized the end of Carey's innocence, while coinciding with the beginning of the end of her marriage to Mottola. Cox observed that by preceding the less successful albums Rainbow and Glitter by a few years, Daydream now indicates that Carey's "absolute commercial zenith would soon be in the rear-view mirror". Similarly, a writer for The 97 stated that while Daydream might be Carey's most famous album, it was "probably the last time Carey managed to truly have mass appeal as an international superstar". Critics have noted that Daydream's follow-up, Butterfly, which ventured further into hip-hop and R&B, was less commercial and sold considerably less than Daydream. Despite its achievements, Carey described Daydream as her "most bittersweet album" in 2022.

== Track listing ==
All lyrics are written by Mariah Carey, except where noted; all music is composed by Mariah Carey and Walter Afanasieff, except where noted. All tracks are produced by Mariah Carey and Walter Afanasieff, except where noted.

Daydream – Standard edition
No.	Title	Lyrics	Music	Producer(s)	Length
1.	"Fantasy"	Mariah Carey; Chris Frantz; Tina Weymouth	Carey; Dave Hall; Frantz; Weymouth; Adrian Belew; Steven Stanley	Carey; Hall	4:04
2.	"Underneath the Stars"				3:33
3.	"One Sweet Day" (with Boyz II Men)	Carey; Michael McCary; Nathan Morris; Wanya Morris; Shawn Stockman			4:42
4.	"Open Arms"	Stephen "Steve" Perry; Jonathan Cain	Perry; Cain		3:30
5.	"Always Be My Baby"		Jermaine Dupri; Carey; Manuel Seal	Carey; Dupri; Seal^{[a]}	4:18
6.	"I Am Free"				3:09
7.	"When I Saw You"				4:24
8.	"Long Ago"		Dupri; Carey; Seal	Carey; Dupri; Seal^{[a]}	4:33
9.	"Melt Away"	Carey; Babyface	Carey; Babyface	Carey	3:42
10.	"Forever"				4:00
11.	"Daydream Interlude" (Fantasy Sweet Dub Mix)	Carey; Frantz; Weymouth	Carey; Hall; Frantz; Weymouth; Belew; Stanley	Carey; David Morales	3:04
12.	"Looking In"				3:35
Total length:					46:42

Japanese edition bonus track
No.	Title	Lyrics	Music	Producer(s)	Length
13.	"Fantasy" (Def Club Mix)	Carey; Frantz; Weymouth	Carey; Frantz; Weymouth; Belew; Stanley; Hall	Carey; Morales^{[b]}	3:45
Total length:					50:27

Latin American/Spain edition bonus track
No.	Title	Lyrics	Music	Producer(s)	Length
13.	"El Amor Que Soñé" (Spanish version)	Cain; Perry	Cain; Perry	Carey; Afanasieff	3:32
Total length:					50:14

30th anniversary edition disc two
No.	Title	Lyrics	Music	Producer(s)	Length
1.	"Fantasy" (Remix featuring O.D.B.)	Carey; Frantz; Weymouth	Carey; Frantz; Waymouth; Belew; Stanley; Hall	Carey; Hall	4:50
2.	"Always Be My Baby" (Mr. Dupri Remix featuring Da Brat and Xscape)		Dupri; Carey; Seal	Carey; Dupri; Seal^{[a]}	4:41
3.	"Underneath the Stars" (Drifting Remix)			Carey; Afanasieff; Franklyn Grant^{[b]}	4:01
4.	"One Sweet Day" (with Boyz II Men) (Chucky's Remix)	Carey; McCary; Morris; Morris; Stockman		Carey; Afanasieff; Chucky Thompson^{[b]}	4:50
5.	"One Night"	Carey; Dupri	Carey; Dupri	Carey; Dupri	4:41
6.	"Slipping Away"		Carey; Hall	Carey; Hall	4:31
7.	"Fantasy" (Def Club Mix)	Carey; Frantz; Weymouth	Carey; Frantz; Weymouth; Belew; Stanley; Hall	Carey; Hall; Morales^{[b]}	11:15
8.	"Underneath the Stars" (Eric Kupper Klassic Club Radio Edit)			Carey; Afanasieff; Eric Kupper^{[b]}	4:02
9.	"Always Be My Baby" (Def Classic Radio version)		Dupri; Carey; Seal	Carey; Dupri; Seal^{[a]}; Morales^{[b]}	4:09
10.	"Fantasy" (Live at Madison Square Garden)	Carey; Frantz; Weymouth	Carey; Frantz; Weymouth; Belew; Stanley; Hall	Carey; Hall	4:30
11.	"One Sweet Day" (with Boyz II Men) (Live at Madison Square Garden)	Carey; McCary; Morris; Morris; Stockman			5:01
12.	"Underneath the Stars" (Live at Tokyo Dome)				3:49
13.	"Forever" (Live at Tokyo Dome)				4:06
14.	"Open Arms" (Live at Rotterdam Ahoy)	Perry; Cain	Perry; Cain		3:49
15.	"Always Be My Baby" (Live at Rotterdam Ahoy)		Dupri; Carey; Seal	Carey; Dupri; Seal^{[a]}	5:32
16.	"I Am Free" (Writing Session Rough Demo)				3:05
Total length:					79:53

Notes

- ^{^[a]} signifies a co-producer
- ^{^[b]} signifies additional producer

Sample credits

- "Fantasy" and "Daydream Interlude" (Fantasy Sweet Dub Mix) contain a sample and interpolation of Tom Tom Club's "Genius of Love" (1981)
- "Long Ago" contains a sample of Zapp's "More Bounce to the Ounce" (1980)

== Personnel ==
Adapted from the Daydream liner notes.

- Mariah Carey – vocals, producer, writer, arranger, crowd noise
- Walter Afanasieff – producer, arranger, programming, synthesizer, bass, keyboard instruments, drum programming
- Babyface – keyboards, background vocals
- Michael McCary – writing, vocals
- Nathan Morris – writing, vocals
- Wanya Morris – writing, vocals
- Shawn Stockman – writing, vocals
- Manuel Seal – piano, writing
- Tristan Avakian – guitar
- Melonie Daniels – crowd noise
- Jermaine Dupri – producer, arranger, lead and backup vocals
- Mick Guzauski – mixing
- Dave Hall – producer, arranger, programming
- Jay Healy – engineer, mixing
- Loris Holland – organ, hammond organ
- Dann Huff – guitar
- Kurt Lundvall – engineer
- David Morales – bass, arranger, keyboards, programming, producer
- Kelly Price – crowd noise
- Shanrae Price – crowd noise

Production

- Mike Scott – engineer
- Manuel Seal – producer, lead and backup vocals
- Dan Shea – synthesizer, bass, keyboards, programming, moog synthesizer, drum programming, synthesizer bass
- Andy Smith – engineer
- David Sussman – engineer, mixing
- Phil Tan – engineer
- Steve Thornton – percussion
- Dana Jon Chappelle – engineer
- Terry Burrus – piano
- Satoshi Tomiie – bass, keyboards, programming, synthesizer bass
- Brian Vibberts – engineer
- Gary Cirimelli – programming, digital programming
- Randy Walker – programming
- Acar Key – engineer
- Frank Filipetti – engineer
- Mark Krieg – 2nd engineer
- Kirk Yano – additional tracking engineer
- Mick Guzauski – mixing

== Charts ==
=== Weekly charts ===
Weekly chart performance for Daydream
Chart (1995−1997)	Peak position
Argentine Albums (CAPIF)	7
Australian Albums (ARIA)	1
Austrian Albums (Ö3 Austria)	5
Belgian Albums (Ultratop Flanders)	6
Belgian Albums (Ultratop Wallonia)	3
Canada Top Albums/CDs (RPM)	2
Canadian Albums (The Record)	3
Chilean Albums (IFPI)	5
Danish Albums (Hitlisten)	2
Dutch Albums (Album Top 100)	1
European Albums (Top 100)	2
Finnish Albums (Suomen virallinen lista)	12
French Albums (SNEP)	2
German Albums (Offizielle Top 100)	1
Hungarian Albums (MAHASZ)	13
Icelandic Albums (Tónlist)	4
Irish Albums (IRMA)	6
Italian Albums (FIMI)	6
Japanese Albums (Oricon)	1
New Zealand Albums (RMNZ)	1
Norwegian Albums (VG-lista)	3
Portuguese Albums (AFP)	1
Scottish Albums (Official Charts)	6
Singapore Albums (SPVA)	2
Spanish Albums (PROMUSICAE)	5
Swedish Albums (Sverigetopplistan)	6
Swiss Albums (Schweizer Hitparade)	1
UK Albums (Official Charts)	1
UK Dance Albums (OCC)	2
UK R&B Albums (Official Charts)	1
US Billboard 200	1
US Top Catalog Albums (Billboard)	45
US Top R&B/Hip-Hop Albums (Billboard)	1
US Top 100 Pop Albums (Cash Box)	1
US Top 75 R&B Albums (Cash Box)	3
Zimbabwean Albums (ZIMA)	1

Chart (2020–2026)	Peak position
Belgian Albums (Ultratop Flanders)	195
Belgian Albums (Ultratop Wallonia)	58
Greek Albums (IFPI)	33
Scottish Albums (Official Charts)	88
UK Albums Downloads (Official Charts)	13
UK Albums Sales (Official Charts)	66
UK R&B Albums (Official Charts)	2
US Billboard 200	163

Weekly chart performance for Daydream: 30th Anniversary Edition
Chart (2026)	Peak position
Japanese Albums (Oricon)	49
Spanish Vinyl Albums (Promusicae)	46

=== Year-end charts ===
1995 year-end chart performance for Daydream
Chart (1995)	Position
Australian Albums (ARIA)	9
Belgian Albums (Ultratop Flanders)	40
Belgian Albums (Ultratop Wallonia)	38
Canada Top Albums/CDs (RPM)	84
Dutch Albums (Album Top 100)	20
European Albums (Top 100)	23
French Albums (SNEP)	17
German Albums (Offizielle Top 100)	49
Italian Albums (FIMI)	8
Japanese Albums (Oricon)	7
New Zealand Albums (RMNZ)	24
Norwegian Autumn Period Albums (VG-lista)	3
Swedish Albums (Sverigetopplistan)	51
Swiss Albums (Schweizer Hitparade)	34
UK Albums (OCC)	13
US Billboard 200	51
US Top R&B/Hip-Hop Albums (Billboard)	57

1996 year-end chart performance for Daydream
Chart (1996)	Position
Australian Albums (ARIA)	9
Canada Top Albums/CDs (RPM)	12
Dutch Albums (Album Top 100)	27
European Albums (Top 100)	20
French Albums (SNEP)	20
German Albums (Offizielle Top 100)	38
New Zealand Albums (RMNZ)	15
Swiss Albums (Schweizer Hitparade)	38
UK Albums (OCC)	57
US Billboard 200	2
US Top R&B/Hip-Hop Albums (Billboard)	7

1997 year-end chart performance for Daydream
Chart (1997)	Position
US Billboard 200	190

=== Decade-end charts ===
1990s-end chart performance for Daydream
Chart (1990–1999)	Position
US Billboard 200	18

=== All-time charts ===
All-time chart performance for Daydream
Chart	Position
US Billboard 200 (Women)	54

== Certifications and sales ==
Certifications and sales for Daydream
Region	Certification	Certified units/sales
Australia (ARIA)	5× Platinum	350,000^{^}
Austria (IFPI Austria)	Gold	25,000^{*}
Belgium (BRMA)	Platinum	50,000^{*}
Brazil (Pro-Música Brasil)	Gold	100,000
Canada (Music Canada)	7× Platinum	700,000^{^}
France (SNEP)	2× Platinum	600,000^{*}
Germany (BVMI)	Platinum	500,000^{^}
Japan (RIAJ)	Million	2,200,000
Netherlands (NVPI)	Platinum	100,000^{^}
New Zealand (RMNZ)	Platinum	15,000^{^}
Norway (IFPI Norway)	Platinum	50,000^{*}
Poland (ZPAV)	Gold	50,000^{*}
Singapore (SPVA)	—	70,000
Spain (Promusicae)	2× Platinum	200,000^{^}
Switzerland (IFPI Switzerland)	Gold	25,000^{^}
United Kingdom (BPI)	2× Platinum	649,000
United States (RIAA)	11× Platinum	11,000,000^{‡}
Summaries
Europe (IFPI)	3× Platinum	3,000,000^{*}
Worldwide	—	20,000,000
^{*} Sales figures based on certification alone.^{^} Shipments figures based on certification alone.^{‡} Sales+streaming figures based on certification alone.

== See also ==
- List of best-selling albums
- List of best-selling albums by women
- List of best-selling albums in the United States
- List of best-selling albums in Japan

== Sources ==
- Bogdanov, Vladimir (2003). All Music Guide to Soul. Bloomsbury Publishing. ISBN 979-8-216-34234-2.
- Chan, Andrew (2023). Why Mariah Carey Matters. University of Texas Press. ISBN 978-1-4773-2509-4.
- Nickson, Chris (1998). Mariah Carey Revisited: Her Story. St. Martin's Press. ISBN 978-0-312-19512-0.
- Shapiro, Marc (2001). Mariah Carey: The Unauthorized Biography. ECW Press. ISBN 978-1-55022-444-3.
