= Always Be My Baby =

1996 single by Mariah Carey

Single by Mariah Carey

from the album Daydream
- B-side: "Long Ago"
- Released: February 20, 1996
- Recorded: 1994
- Studio: Crave Studios (New York, NY); The Hit Factory (New York, NY)
- Genre: Pop; R&B
- Length: 4:18
- Label: Columbia
- Composers: Mariah Carey; Jermaine Dupri; Manuel Seal
- Lyricist: Mariah Carey
- Producers: Mariah Carey; Jermaine Dupri

Mariah Carey singles chronology
"Open Arms" (1995)	"Always Be My Baby" (1996)	"Forever" (1996)

Music videos
- "Always Be My Baby" on YouTube; "Always Be My Baby" (Mr. Dupri mix) on YouTube

"Always Be My Baby" is a song by American singer-songwriter Mariah Carey from her fifth studio album, Daydream (1995). Written by Carey, Jermaine Dupri and Manuel Seal, and produced by Carey and Dupri, It was released by Columbia Records on February 20, 1996, as the album's third single in the United States and fourth single internationally. A midtempo pop ballad, "Always Be My Baby" describes the attachment the singer feels towards an estranged lover, while confidently asserting that they will eventually reunite. Described by critics as both a love song and a breakup song, its composition is characterized by harpsichord, piano keyboards, drums, acoustic guitars, and layered background vocals.

"Always Be My Baby" received critical acclaim upon release, with reviewers praising its production and Carey's vocals. In retrospect, several publications have ranked it one of Carey's best songs. The song was a commercial success, becoming Carey's eleventh chart-topper on the Billboard Hot 100, tying her with Madonna and Whitney Houston for most number-one singles by a female artist at the time. It spent two weeks atop the chart and became Carey's eighth chart-topper on the Canadian RPM Top Singles chart. The song is certified seven-times platinum in the US. It is also certified platinum in the US for selling one million units as master tone in the US by 2007. In other regions, the single performed well, peaking at number three in the United Kingdom, number five in New Zealand, number 17 in Australia and in the top 20 in most music markets where it charted.

The accompanying music video for "Always Be My Baby" features scenes of Carey frolicking by a campsite in upstate New York, as well as swinging on a Cooper Tire over a lake. Additional inter-cuts include scenes of a boy and girl sneaking out at night and spending time together by a campfire similar to Carey's location. Most scenes from the video were filmed at The Fresh Air Fund's Camp Mariah, named after Carey for her generous support and dedication to Fresh Air Fund children. The song was performed live during her Daydream World Tour (1996) and many of her future tours and concerts. "Always Be My Baby" was also featured in Carey's compilation albums: #1's (1998), Greatest Hits (2001), The Ballads (2008) and #1 to Infinity (2015). The U.S. and Canadian B-side "Slipping Away" is included in the compilation album The Rarities (2020).

== Background and recording ==
Singer Mariah Carey began writing and recording material for what would become her fifth album, Daydream, in late 1994, and enlisted producers with whom she had not worked prior to give her music a different sound. Sony Music Entertainment CEO Tommy Mottola, who was Carey's husband and manager at the time, suggested that she work with record producer Jermaine Dupri after the two met each other at a Grammys party hosted by Columbia, their shared record label. In 1994, Dupri had previously remixed Carey's song, "Never Forget You", for its single release, but "Always Be My Baby" was their first time collaborating on a project. According to Carey, she opted to work with Dupri because he had a "very distinct vibe", and said they share a lot of musical influences and childhood favorite songs. Meanwhile, Dupri identified "Always Be My Baby" as the first time he had worked with an artist of Carey's caliber, prior to whom he had mainly worked with newer, upcoming artists.

Carey had envisioned the song as having a harder, rawer production than her previous records, originally suggesting that she record over the beat from "C.R.E.A.M." by Wu-Tang Clan, which shocked Dupri. Additionally, Carey commissioned assistance from hip-hop and R&B producer Manuel Seal. As Seal played different keys on the piano, Carey led him with the melody she was "hearing inside her head" and began humming the phrase "always be my baby". Carey said she described how she wanted the song to feel to Dupri and Seal, while Dupri programmed the drums and Seal played keyboard. Carey sang the melody as the collaborators worked on the bridge and B-section for lyrics that Carey had already outlined. According to Dupri, "the whole song actually came from Mariah", and claims he had little to no involvement writing the song's lyrics.

"Always Be My Baby" marked the first of several collaborations between Carey and Dupri. Like producers before him, Dupri commended Carey's vocal abilities, "she can pretty much do anything with her voice. She's really strong vocally." Another musical craft the song featured was the inclusion of heavy background vocals of her lower registers, with Carey then belting and singing the higher notes over her background vocals and melody, creating a "double voice effect". When discussing the technique used in the background vocals, Carey said:

The background vocals are an important part of the picture for me. That's why I like to do them myself a lot of the time, or initially I'll lay down the tracks. I'll double my voice or do a couple of tracks of my own voice. It's easy for me to match my voice. And then if I'm going to use other background singers, I'll let them go on top of mine.

The producer recalled feeling unaccustomed to the rigid schedule of his recording sessions with Carey while they were working on "Always Be My Baby". Instead of remaining in the studio until the song was finished, they worked from 9:00 am to 5:30 pm, at which time Mottola would end their session to take Carey to dinner, regardless of the progress they had made. Dupri admitted that he did not quite like "Always Be My Baby" upon completing it, fearing listeners would not care for the song. Carey and Dupri collaborated on at least four songs for Daydream, but "Always Be My Baby" was one of only two that were included on the final album. Dupri has expressed some regret that "Always Be My Baby" wasn't selected as its parent album's first or second single, explaining, "I didn't feel like I had accomplished too much of anything ... the fact that I didn't get the first or second single...even with two songs that I did [on Daydream], I felt like I didn't really do what I was supposed to do". He has described the song as arguably "one of my biggest least-known works", despite its popularity and success. Dupri said the record ultimately made him rich and successful by establishing him as Columbia's number-one producer by producing a hit song for their number-one artist at the time, becoming the biggest song of his career at that point.

== Music and lyrics ==
"Always Be My Baby" is a midtempo ballad, that incorporates the pop and R&B genres. Dupri described it as a "traditional pop, R&B type of record", likening it to previous work he had done for the girl group Xscape. Carey herself described it as a "very poppy" song played over a "hard" bassline. Journalist Alexis Petridis said the song is "Perfectly poised between super-smooth pop, R&B and gospel". Rolling Stone's Brittany Spanos identified the track as one of the "more straightforward pop hits from the early portion of [Carey's] career, featuring a catchy chorus and one of her most tender vocal performances". The ballad has a "relaxed pop" tempo of 80 beats per minute. Spin's Brenton Blanchet described it as "not quite a ballad and it's not quite a doo-wop anthem", although its "do-do-dos" might convince listeners otherwise, and Pitchfork observed Motown influences in its chorus. Pitchfork's Jamieson Cox observed that "there are moments ... where all you hear is Mariah singing over rock-solid piano chords", finding its arrangement and simplicity "almost surprising given her taste for the ostentatious". Chris Gayomali of GQ said that, musically, the song begins conventionally before surprising listeners by introducing elements such as a guitar-played intro and Carey harmonizing with herself in different octaves, before culminating in a key change where the singer "just really starts going full-throttle".

"Always Be My Baby"
A 27-second sample of the song, featuring background vocals described as "double voice".

Jordan Runtagh of People and Tom Breihan of Stereogum described the ballad as a hybrid between a love and breakup song, with the latter saying Carey expresses "near-psychotic levels of self-confidence" by remaining unbothered despite having been dumped. The Daily Telegraph described the track as a love song that details Carey's attachment to her former lover, while Entertainment Weekly's Michael Slezak and The Stranger's Kyle Fleck said it is about enduring love. According to Billboard's Jason Lipshutz, Carey sings from a position of understanding that she can not salvage her relationship; she promises she will thrive, regardless of whether or not her partner returns. Another writer for Billboard, Charné Graham, agreed that Carey takes "a more optimistic" approach to heartbreak, describing her declarations that her partner's departure is only temporary as "almost-threatening". Contrarily, Brad Nelson of Pitchfork said "Always Be My Baby" is not a breakup song but rather "a song about eternity" emphasizing "Just because something is over doesn't mean it's over". Its lyrics feature several ad libs, opening with "doo-doo-doo dow" heard throughout the song's chorus. According to Forbes senior contributor Jacqueline Schneider, the song's playful verses "speaks to Carey's signature songwriting style". Brendan Schroer of Sputnikmusic theorized that "Always Be My Baby" was one of the songs on Daydream inspired by Mottola, since "she says a certain ex-lover will always be a part of her despite the two splitting apart". The hook reads, "You'll always be a part of me, I'm part of you indefinitely/Boy, don't you know you can't escape me/Darling, 'cause you'll always be my baby". Instrumentation includes piano, "tinny" keyboards, drums, and acoustic guitar that "ides the beat a little bit", according to Breihan, and "has the artificial shimmer of a romanticized memory", according to Nelson.

Carey's vocal range on the song spans two octaves and one semitone, from the low note of E_{3} to the high note of F_{5}. The song features a "double voice" which is an effect Carey created in the studio, where her lower vocal notes are used as backup, and her higher chest notes are belted overtop and used as the song's main focal point. Breihan said that, vocally, the song finds Carey "finding a new comfort zone, twirling her wildly virtuosic dip-divy vocal ululations around an easy lope of a hip-hop beat and just letting her voice flow", in contrast to the adult contemporary ballads she had sung prior. Carey's own background vocals are also supported by contributions from singer Kelly Price.

== Critical reception ==
"Always Be My Baby" has received acclaim from music critics. Larry Flick from Billboard magazine described it as "a delightfully bright and funky finger-snapper". He added that "the pop princess reminds us that she has the loose-wristed soul to go with those deliciously soaring and dramatic high notes amid a sweet arrangement of easy acoustic guitars, rolling piano lines, and chipper jeep beats." Daina Darzin from Cash Box noted its "swoop of pure, airy harmonies and gently syncopated R&B rhythms". Ken Tucker from Entertainment Weekly complimented the song's "relaxed swing", and felt that its instrumentation helped make it a standout from the album. Alan Jones from Music Week stated that "it's a concise, fairly subdued and very catchy tune and a fine showcase for Carey, who resists the temptation to indulge too heavily in vocal gymnastics." Stephen Holden, editor of The New York Times, complimented "Always Be My Baby", calling it one of "the best on the album". Chris Gayomali of GQ called it "As far as perfect pop songs go". Brendan Schroer of Sputnikmusic felt the track demonstrates a maturation and effort in Carey's lyrics compared to her previous work, while Kyle Fleck of The Stranger found it to be "the most compelling of all Carey's ballads", despite its sentimental title, and "the first and most potent of Carey's breakup anthems". In a ranking of Carey's albums, Slant Magazine called the track "note-perfect". At the 38th Grammy Awards the song received a nomination for Best Female R&B Vocal Performance.

Retrospectively, "Always Be My Baby" has consistently been ranked among the strongest songs in Carey's discography by several publications. Oprah Daily considers it to be one of the 12 best songs of Carey's career. In 2014, a Vulture listicle declared it Carey's best single, calling it "essential, archetypal Mariah". In 2020, Billboard placed it first in a ranking of the singer's 100 greatest songs, describing "Always Be My Baby" as a "practically unmatched" track that "crystallizes Carey's pop genius and has imprinted itself on millions". Staff members for Entertainment Weekly ranked it second among her number-one singles, behind only "Fantasy" from the same album. Cleveland.com ranked it the second-best single of her career, with author Troy L. Smith saying it "contains what may be the most infectious piano melody in music history". Ranking "Always Be My Baby" Carey's second best number-one, Glenn Gamboa of Newsday noted that the song "shows that she can be chill and laid-back enough to make 'doobedoo oh' work as a chorus". American Songwriter ranked it her third-best song, while Us Weekly ranked it her third-best number-one song. The Independent, Rolling Stone, and TheGrio named it her fifth-best song. Brenton Blanchet of Spin ranked it her fifth-best number-one, saying it "set a whole new standard for what pop was going to be in 1996". Alexis Petridis of The Guardian ranked it Carey's sixth-greatest single, noting that 2005's "Don't Forget About Us" is a spiritual successor due to appearing to revisit "lyrical heartbreak set to music that feels sunlit". Forbes ranked it 24th on its "50 Greatest Love Songs".

According to Anna Oseran of Genius, "Always Be My Baby" "solidified [Carey's] place alongside other pop divas". Several media outlets have called "Always Be My Baby" one of the greatest songs of the 1990s, with Glamour ranking it seventh. The Oregonian ranked it the second-best song of 1996. In a countdown of the "250 Best Songs of the 1990s", Pitchfork ranked "Always Be My Baby" 49th. Author Brad Nelson said the song ushered in "a point of transformation for Carey". Troy L. Smith of Cleveland.com ranked it the 23rd best number-one song of the 1990s, calling it " the one Mariah Carey single where she's more impressive as a songwriter". Nicholas Hautman of Us Weekly said the song's success, which was Carey's first collaboration with Dupri, ultimately led to "one of the strongest partnerships in modern-day music". Some publications have also recognized "Always Be My Baby" as one of the best breakup songs.

=== Accolades ===
Accolades for "Always Be My Baby"
Publication	Accolade	Rank	Ref.
Glamour	The 53 Best ’90s Songs	7	
Pitchfork	The 250 Best Songs of the 1990s	49	
Yardbarker	The Best Pop Songs of the 1990s	28	

== Chart performance ==
"Always Be My Baby" was released by Columbia Records on March 9, 1996, in Europe, and debuted at number two on the Billboard Hot 100 chart on the issue dated April 6, 1996, behind Celine Dion's "Because You Loved Me", which had replaced Carey's previous single, "One Sweet Day", at number one. "Always Be My Baby" stayed at number two for four weeks, and topped the Hot 100 on May 4, 1996, where it spent two weeks before returning to the number two position for an additional five weeks. At the end of its US chart run, the song spent a total of nine weeks at number two, the fourth longest stay in the chart's history. The song became Carey's 11th chart topper in the United States, tying her with Madonna and Whitney Houston as the female solo artist with the most number-one singles, a record she soon passed. After spending two weeks atop the Hot 100, the three singles from Daydream had given Carey a combined 26 weeks (six months) atop the chart, something never duplicated by another artist until Usher and the Black Eyed Peas in the mid to late 2000s. In Canada, the song became Carey's eighth chart topper, after it ascended to the number one position on the Canadian RPM Singles Chart during the week of May 20, 1996.

While it charted well inside the US, the song did not manage to chart as high as her previous two singles "Fantasy" and "One Sweet Day" elsewhere. In Australia, the song entered the Australian Singles Chart at number 28 during the week of March 13, 1996. The song spent 16 weeks fluctuating in the chart before spending its last week at number 47 on June 30. "Always Be My Baby" was certified double platinum by the Australian Recording Industry Association (ARIA), denoting sales and streams of over 140,000. The song debuted and peaked at number five in New Zealand, spending three consecutive weeks at the position. After 16 weeks, the song fell off the singles chart and was certified gold by the Recording Industry Association of New Zealand (RIANZ). In the United Kingdom, the song debuted and peaked at number three on the UK Singles Chart, making it the highest-charting single from the album. In its second week, the song fell to number four, staying on the chart for a total of ten weeks. As of 2008, sales in the UK are estimated at 220,000. In Ireland, the song peaked at number ten on the Irish Singles Chart, spending nine weeks in the chart. In the Netherlands, "Always Be My Baby" entered the singles chart at number 43 during the week on April 20, 1996. The song peaked at number 27, spending one week at the position and five weeks in the chart overall. "Always Be My Baby" entered the singles chart in Sweden at number 58 during the week of May 3, 1996. After peaking at number 38 and spending a total of five weeks in the chart, the song fell off the Swedish Singles Chart.

== Music video ==
The accompanying music video for "Always Be My Baby" was the second video Carey's directed. In it, she is the seemingly happy narrator of a tale of young love, as a young boy and a girl elope in the middle of the night. The video was filmed on location at Carey's sponsored charity, the Fresh Air Fund upstate New York camp. The video begins with scenes of Carey, in a denim jacket, jeans, and bare feet, on a lakeside tire-swing, smiling and beginning to retell a story of young love. As she sits upon the swing, scenes of two children sneaking out of their bungalow in the middle of the night are shown. They frolic together beside a fireplace, soon coming up to the lakeside swing Carey had been on before. They soon go swimming wearing their clothes, much like Carey did in her video for "Dreamlover" though she does not jump into the water herself this time. As they jump into the water, Carey is then seen by the campfire they passed on their journey to the lake, smiling with friends and enjoying herself by the fire. Eventually the boy and girl are seen kissing underwater. The video concludes with scenes of the young boy and girl walking together back to their bungalow, walking hand-in-hand. Having possibly witnessed the entire event, Carey is seen once again by the large swing, chuckling and staring into the night's sky. On August 14, 2020, the music video was re-released in a remastered form, in HD quality.

An alternate video was shot for the song's remix. It too was directed by Carey, and was shot in black and white. The shot of Carey in a beret that would become the cover for this single is a scene from the video. The video features Da Brat and Xscape and a cameo appearance by Jermaine Dupri. It begins with Carey and the others recording in Carey's in-home studio. In the video, Carey is wearing a large white, puffy jacket and long golden hair. Scenes of Carey by her indoor pool are shown, with cameos made by her dog, Jack. Da Brat and Xscape are seen poolside with Carey, playing cards and drinking beer, as they further bond and laugh. Towards the end of the video, scenes of the studio are shown, intermingled with snippets of Carey walking inside the mansion she shared with then-husband Tommy Mottola. The video ends with Carey and Da Brat bonding by the studio and pool.

== Live performances ==
Carey performed the song throughout the entire run of her Daydream World Tour (1996), Rainbow World Tour (2000), The Adventures of Mimi (2006), The Elusive Chanteuse Show (2014), Caution World Tour (2019), and during select shows on her Charmbracelet World Tour (2002–03), and Angels Advocate Tour (2009–10). During the Japanese shows in 1996, Carey donned a white suit and jacket, and featured three female back-up singers. Red spotlights were used throughout the performance, as well as some light dance routines. During her Rainbow World Tour, Carey wore a two-piece outfit, a pair of pants and top, with golden heels. Three back-up singers were provided, one male and two female, while Carey interacted with the front row fans. On her Adventures of Mimi Tour in 2006, Carey donned a pair of black leggings, worn with a bikini-like top. Wearing Christian Louboutin pumps, Carey sang on the arena's secondary stage, where she sang three of the set-list's titles. On her Elusive Chanteuse Show in 2014, Carey often used the song as her encore, entering the stage in a tight-fitted blue gown and black gloves. Carey included the song in her 2015 Las Vegas residency, Mariah Carey Number 1's, where she walked through the audience for the second verse and chorus. Carey also included the song in her 2018–2019 Las Vegas residency The Butterfly Returns, where she was accompanied by her children Moroccan and Monroe in selected dates. In 2020, during the COVID-19 pandemic, Carey closed out FOX's iHeart Living Room Concert for America with the song.

== Covers and uses in other media ==
On the seventh season of American Idol, David Cook performed a rock arrangement of the song during the April 15, 2008, episode, in which Carey mentored the contestants on her songs. His version received high praise from all three judges, and even Carey herself. Cook's studio recording of the song was released on the iTunes Store during the show's run as "Always Be My Baby (American Idol Studio Version) – Single" and was among the season's best-selling singles. In 2015, girl group Fifth Harmony heavily sampled "Always Be My Baby" in their song "Like Mariah", a track from their debut studio album, Reflection, that features rapper Tyga. In 2022, singer-songwriter Rosie Thomas covered the song with Sufjan Stevens, the Shins, Josh Ottum, and percussionist James McAlister. The cover was included on Thomas' album Lullabies for Parents, Vol. 1. Chris Deville of Stereogum said the cover "achieves its goal of transforming 'Always Be My Baby' into a grownup lullaby", despite not rivaling the original. The song is referenced and featured in the 2019 romantic comedy Always Be My Maybe, starring Ali Wong and Randall Park. Carey herself shared the film's trailer on Twitter, saying "I approve the song selection! (literally)". In 2022, Carey launched the "Always Be My Baby" challenge to promote Snapchat's Spotlight feature, by encouraging users to use "Always Be My Baby" in a romantic-themed video for a chance to win a cash prize.

== Remixes ==
The main remix for the song was also produced by Jermaine Dupri. Known as the "Mr. Dupri Mix", it features re-sung vocals with all of the lyrics and most of the melodic structure retained while using a sample of the song "Tell Me If You Still Care" by The SOS Band. It includes a rap from Da Brat and background vocals from Xscape.

Carey recorded yet another set of vocals for dance remixes produced by David Morales that were initially only released on maxi-single in the UK until their release in the US as part of "#MC30", a promotional campaign marking the 30th anniversary of Carey's self-titled debut. The main dance remix, named the "Always Club Mix" (along with its edit, the "Def Classic Radio Mix"), has a totally new melodic structure and lyrics altered to fit the new melody and song structure. DJ Satoshi Tomiie also created a dance dub that used these new vocals; calling it the "ST Dub", it appeared on the maxi-single that included the Morales mixes.

=== Other versions ===
The original album vocals were also remixed into a reggae version that included Jamaican-American reggae rap artist Li'l Vicious. Called the "Reggae Soul Mix", this remix includes a rap breakdown by Vicious, with him shouting over Carey's vocals throughout the track.

In 2021, Carey recorded a new version of the song which was included in the HBO Max's animated television special, The Runaway Bunny based on the book of the same name.

== Track listings ==
- Worldwide CD single
1. "Always Be My Baby" (album version) – 4:19
2. "Always Be My Baby" (Mr. Dupri Mix) [feat. Da Brat & Xscape] – 4:43
3. "Always Be My Baby" (Mr. Dupri Extended Mix) [feat. Da Brat & Xscape] – 5:33
4. "Always Be My Baby" (Reggae Soul Mix) [feat. Lil' Vicious] – 4:56
5. "Always Be My Baby" (Mr. Dupri No Rap Radio Mix) [feat. Xscape] – 3:44
- US 7-inch single
1. "Always Be My Baby" – 4:18
2. "Long Ago" – 4:32
- US and Canada CD single
1. "Always Be My Baby" (album version) – 4:18
2. "Always Be My Baby" (Mr. Dupri Mix) – 4:40
3. "Slipping Away" – 4:30
- Worldwide 12-inch single
1. "Always Be My Baby" (Always Club) – 10:51
2. "Always Be My Baby" (Dub-A-Baby) – 7:16
3. "Always Be My Baby" (Groove a Pella) – 7:15
4. "Always Be My Baby" (ST Dub) – 7:12
- UK CD single (Part 1)
1. "Always Be My Baby" (Album Version) – 4:17
2. "Always Be My Baby" (Mr. Dupri Extended Mix) – 5:33
3. "Always Be My Baby" (Mr. Dupri No Rap Radio Mix) – 3:43
4. "Always Be My Baby" (Reggae Soul Mix) – 4:54
5. "Always Be My Baby" (Reggae Soul Dub Mix) – 4:53
- UK CD single (Part 2)
1. "Always Be My Baby" (Def Classic Radio Mix) – 4:08
2. "Always Be My Baby" (Always Club Mix) – 10:24
3. "Always Be My Baby" (Dub-A-Baby) – 7:15
4. "Always Be My Baby" (Groove A Pella) – 7:08
5. "Always Be My Baby" (ST Dub) – 7:13
- Always Be My Baby EP
1. "Always Be My Baby" (feat. Da Brat & Xscape – Mr. Dupri Mix) – 4:42
2. "Always Be My Baby" (feat. Xscape – Mr. Dupri No Rap Radio Mix) – 3:43
3. "Always Be My Baby" (feat. Da Brat & Xscape – Mr. Dupri Extended Mix) – 5:32
4. "Always Be My Baby" (Def Classic Radio Version) – 4:09
5. "Always Be My Baby" (Always Club Mix) – 10:26
6. "Always Be My Baby" (Groove A Pella) – 7:10
7. "Always Be My Baby" (Dub-A-Baby) – 7:16
8. "Always Be My Baby" (ST Dub) – 7:14
9. "Always Be My Baby" (Live at Madison Square Garden – October 1995) – 3:48

== Credits and personnel ==
Credits are adapted from the Daydream liner notes.

- Mariah Carey – lyricist, co-production, arrangement, songwriting, vocals, background vocals
- Jermaine Dupri – co-production, songwriting
- Manuel Seal Jr. – co-production, songwriting

== Charts ==
=== Weekly charts ===
Weekly chart performance for "Always Be My Baby"
Chart (1996−2022)	Peak position
Australia (ARIA)	17
Canada Top Singles (RPM)	1
Canada Adult Contemporary (RPM)	1
Canada Dance/Urban (RPM)	20
Canada Retail Singles (The Record)	16
Canada Contemporary Hit Radio (The Record)	1
Canada Hit Parade (AC/CHR/Rock) (The Record)	2
Croatia (HR Top 40)	11
Europe (Eurochart Hot 100)	19
Europe (European AC Radio)	10
Germany (GfK)	76
Hungary (Single Top 40)	34
Iceland (Íslenski Listinn Topp 40)	29
Ireland (IRMA)	10
Israel (IBA)	1
Japan (Oricon)	79
Netherlands (Dutch Top 40)	30
Netherlands (Single Top 100)	27
New Zealand (Recorded Music NZ)	5
Panama (UPI)	4
Scottish Singles Sales (Official Charts)	11
South Africa Airplay (EMA)	2
Spain Airplay (Music & Media)	14
Sweden (Sverigetopplistan)	38
UK Singles (Official Charts)	3
UK Dance (Official Charts)	16
UK Hip Hop/R&B (Official Charts)	2
UK Airplay (Music Week)	2
UK Club Chart (Music Week) Satoshi Tomiie/David Morales/Jermaine Dupri mixes	9
UK Pop Tip Club Chart (Music Week)	28
UK Airplay (Music & Media)	1
US Billboard Hot 100	1
US Adult Contemporary (Billboard)	2
US Adult Pop Airplay (Billboard)	2
US Dance Club Songs (Billboard)	6
US Dance Singles Sales (Billboard)	4
US Hot R&B/Hip-Hop Songs (Billboard)	1
US Pop Airplay (Billboard)	3
US Rhythmic Airplay (Billboard)	1
US Cash Box Top 100	1
US Top 100 Urban Singles (Cash Box)	1
US Adult Contemporary (Gavin Report)	2
US Top 40 (Gavin Report)	1
US Urban (Gavin Report)	1
US Adult Contemporary (Radio & Records)	2
US CHR/Pop (Radio & Records)	2
US CHR/Rhythmic (Radio & Records)	1
US Hot AC (Radio & Records)	2
US Urban (Radio & Records)	1
US Urban AC (Radio & Records)	3

Chart (2019)	Peak position
US R&B Digital Songs (Billboard)	15

=== Year-end charts ===
Year-end chart performance for "Always Be My Baby"
Chart (1996)	Position
Australia (ARIA)	64
Canada Top Singles (RPM)	21
Canada Adult Contemporary (RPM)	6
New Zealand (Recorded Music NZ)	28
UK Singles (OCC)	57
UK Airplay (Music Week)	22
US Billboard Hot 100	5
US Adult Contemporary (Billboard)	11
US Adult Contemporary (Radio & Records)	8
US Adult Top 40 (Billboard)	21
US Hot R&B/Hip-Hop Songs (Billboard)	19
US Mainstream Top 40 (Billboard)	9
US Rhythmic (Billboard)	3
US CHR/Pop (Radio & Records)	8
US CHR/Rhythmic (Radio & Records)	1
US Hot AC (Radio & Records)	12
US Urban (Radio & Records)	14
US Urban AC (Radio & Records)	11

=== Decade-end charts ===
Decade-end chart performance for "Always Be My Baby"
Chart (1990–1999)	Position
US Billboard Hot 100	49

== Certifications ==
Certifications for "Always Be My Baby"
Region	Certification	Certified units/sales
Australia (ARIA)	2× Platinum	140,000^{‡}
New Zealand (RMNZ)	3× Platinum	90,000^{‡}
United Kingdom (BPI)	Platinum	600,000^{‡}
United States (RIAA)	7× Platinum	7,000,000^{‡}
United States (RIAA) Mastertone	Platinum	1,000,000^{*}
^{*} Sales figures based on certification alone.^{‡} Sales+streaming figures based on certification alone.

== Release history ==
Release dates and formats for "Always Be My Baby"
Region	Date	Format(s)	Label(s)	Ref.
Canada	February 20, 1996	CD single	Columbia	
United States	February 27, 1996	Contemporary hit radio; rhythmic contemporary radio	Columbia	
Japan	March 7, 1996	Mini CD single	Sony Music Japan	
United States	March 19, 1996	7-inch vinyl; 12-inch vinyl; cassette single; cassette maxi single; CD single; CD maxi single	Columbia	
United Kingdom	June 3, 1996	Cassette single; CD single	Columbia	
