= Fantasy (Mariah Carey song) =

1995 single by Mariah Carey

Single by Mariah Carey

from the album Daydream
- B-side: "Fantasy" (Bad Boy) featuring O.D.B
- Released: August 23, 1995
- Studio: DMH (New York City)
- Genre: Pop; dance-pop; R&B
- Length: 4:04
- Label: Columbia
- Composers: Mariah Carey; Dave Hall; Chris Frantz; Tina Weymouth; Adrian Belew; Steven Stanley
- Lyricists: Mariah Carey; Chris Frantz; Tina Weymouth
- Producers: Mariah Carey; Dave Hall

Mariah Carey singles chronology
"Miss You Most (At Christmas Time)" (1994)	"Fantasy" (1995)	"One Sweet Day" (1995)

Music videos
- "Fantasy" on YouTube; "Fantasy" (remix) on YouTube

"Fantasy" is a song by American singer Mariah Carey. It was released on August 23, 1995, by Columbia Records as the lead single from her fifth album, Daydream (1995). The track was written and produced by Carey and Dave Hall. It samples Tom Tom Club's 1981 song "Genius of Love". The lyrics describe a woman who is in love with a man, and how every time she sees him she starts fantasizing about an impossible relationship with him. The remix for the song features rap verses from Ol' Dirty Bastard, something Carey arranged to assist in her crossover into the hip-hop market.

"Fantasy" received critical acclaim, with reviewers praising its production, lyrics, Carey's vocal performance and musical progression. The song became a global success, topping the charts in Australia, Canada, New Zealand, and the United States, and reaching the top-ten in twenty countries. In the US, "Fantasy" became the first song by a female artist—and second overall—to debut atop the Billboard Hot 100, topping the chart for eight consecutive weeks. Additionally, it became Carey's ninth number one on the chart.

Carey sang "Fantasy" live on several television and award show appearances around the world. She performed the song at the 23rd American Music Awards, held on January 29, 1996. Additionally, it was performed live on British music chart program Top of the Pops and on French television. "Fantasy" was part of the set-lists on several of Carey's succeeding tours, making its debut during the album's accompanying set of concerts, the Daydream World Tour and is featured on her compilation albums, #1's (1998), Greatest Hits (2001), The Remixes (2003), Playlist: The Very Best of Mariah Carey (2010) and #1 to Infinity (2015).

The cover of the single was shot by top fashion photographer Steven Meisel. Its parent album Daydream uses a cropped version of the single cover. Carey directed the music video for "Fantasy", making it her directorial debut. She created the video's concept and chose the filming location. After being disappointed with the final result in many of her previous videos, Carey decided to single-handedly direct the video. The video features her rollerblading through Playland Amusement Park in Rye, New York, singing and enjoying herself. The video concludes with Carey dancing atop the sunroof of a Hummer, with many others present and enjoying the music and celebration.

== Background ==
With Daydream, Carey began incorporating urban R&B and hip hop into her music, something very noticeable in "Fantasy". After Carey began writing songs for her new album Daydream, she decided to include the hook from the Tom Tom Club song "Genius of Love" into an up-tempo song. Afterwards, Carey and Hall began incorporating the sample into the lyrics and melody she had already produced. Carey described how the idea to sample the song became a reality:

I was listening to the radio and heard 'Genius of Love', and I hadn't heard it in a long time. It reminded me of growing up and listening to the radio and that feeling the song gave me seemed to go with the melody and basic idea I had for "Fantasy". I initially told Dave about the idea, and we did it. We called up the Tom Tom Club and they were really into it.

Carey recalled how the writers of the song were really intrigued by the idea of Carey sampling the song, and immediately signed over the rights. After Carey presented Hall with the sample, the chorus and beat, he developed a familiar groove that he felt would "highlight Carey's voice." After they completed the song, Carey's husband and Columbia CEO Tommy Mottola listened to "Fantasy" and agreed to include it on the album. The cover of the single was shot by top fashion photographer Steven Meisel. A cropped version of the photograph was used as the album cover as well. Hall described his experience with writing the song with Carey:

[It] was a fun song to do. Mariah brought me 'Genius of Love' and I laid some strings on it and put it into a groove I felt really fit and highlighted her voice. And that song didn't take us but a minute to do, because she really busted that out within two days. We did a rough copy and let Tommy Mottola hear it and he loved it, so all we had to do was bring it back in and mix it.

== Composition ==
"Fantasy"
A sample of "Fantasy", featuring a sampled hook and other beats.

"Fantasy" is an up-tempo song with contemporary R&B and dance-pop genres within its composition, which blends elements of funk music, hip hop, and bubblegum pop. Stephen Holden from The New York Times described it as a combination of "gospel-flavored pop-soul" and "light hip-hop". "Fantasy" moves at a "moderate dance tempo" of 104 beats per minute. The remix, which features rap verses from O.D.B., also incorporates hip-hop into the bridge. The song uses heavy bass and percussion, as well as a sample from "Genius of Love" by Tom Tom Club. Carey's vocal range spans three octaves from the low note of E_{3} to the high note of E_{6}. The song contains choral lyrics written by Carey, who also developed the song's melody and original beat. Instrumentation and production was performed by Dave Hall, while co-arranging and producing the track as well. The members of Tom Tom Club, Tina Weymouth, Chris Frantz, Steven Stanley and Adrian Belew are all credited as writers due to the inclusion of the music sample they wrote.

== Critical reception ==
Professional ratings
Review scores
Source	Rating
AllMusic	4/5 stars
The Charlotte Observer	2.5/4 stars
The Charlotte Post	3/5 stars
Christgau's Consumer Guide	(choice cut)
Entertainment Weekly (1995)	C
Entertainment Weekly (2017)	A+
Smash Hits	2/5 stars
Stereogum	10/10

Upon its release, "Fantasy" garnered acclaim from contemporary music critics, who praised her songwriting and use of sampling. They commended her for exploring genres beyond the pop ballads she had become known for at the time. Bill Lamb from About.com was very positive on the song, calling it "truly inspiring" and a "career high water mark" for Carey. Stephen Thomas Erlewine from AllMusic also complimented it, saying "Carey continues to perfect her craft and that she has earned her status as an R&B/pop diva." A reviewer from Music & Media stated that "it's got more swing than anything she has done before." Stephen Holden from The New York Times gave the song praise, writing "with 'Fantasy', Ms. Carey glides confidently into the territory where gospel-flavored pop-soul meets light hip-hop and recorded some of the most gorgeously spun choral music to be found on a contemporary album." Additionally, he claimed "Fantasy" held some of the album's best moments, writing "she continues to make pop music as deliciously enticing as the best moments of "Fantasy". Slant Magazine ranked the song at number sixty on their "Best Singles of the '90s" list, writing it is "escapism perfected, [a] summer bubblegum gem with a sweet, flawless vocal line driven by a diva in her prime." Mark Frith from Smash Hits said it "was such a brilliant, original, clever record that many people are going to have high hopes for the LP." Another Smash Hits editor, Mark Sutherland, was negative, giving "Fantasy" two out of five, writing, "Unfortunately, it is also the 43rd Mariah Carey single in history to be Not Very Good At All."

=== Accolades ===
Accolades for "Fantasy"
Publication	Accolade	Rank	Ref.
Forbes	The 50 Best Songs of the 1990s	28	
PureWow	The 53 Best ‘90s Songs of All Time	14	
Slant Magazine	The 100 Best Singles of the 1990s	61	
Time Out	The 50 Best ’90s Songs	46	

Accolades for "Fantasy (Bad Boy Remix)"
Publication	Accolade	Rank	Ref.
Esquire	The 50 Best Songs of the ’90s	2	
Pitchfork	The 250 Best Songs of the 1990s	1	

Accolades for "Fantasy (Def Club Mix)"
Publication	Accolade	Rank	Ref.
Rolling Stone	200 Greatest Dance Songs of All Time	142	

== Chart performance ==
"Fantasy" was Carey's ninth No. 1 single on the US Billboard Hot 100 chart. It was also the first single by a female artist to debut atop the chart, and only the second single to do so after "You Are Not Alone" by Michael Jackson. It debuted at No. 1 due to strong airplay, being popular among radio listeners, and initial sales of 229,000 copies—the highest sales of a single, at the time, since Whitney Houston's "I Will Always Love You" (1993). "Fantasy" spent eight straight weeks at the top of the American chart, from September 30-November 18, 1995; at the time, the song was Carey's longest stay at the top, after her earlier single "Dreamlover" (1993). The single replaced "Gangsta's Paradise" by Coolio, but was replaced by Whitney Houston's "Exhale (Shoop Shoop)", which also debuted atop the Hot 100. "Fantasy" spent 25 weeks within the top 40, and was equally as successful on other Billboard formats, including the R&B and dance charts. The song debuted at No. 11 on Billboard Mainstream R&B/Hip-Hop chart, setting a record at the time for the chart's highest debut, which would eventually be surpassed by Drake's "Nice for What" (2018). Strong sales led to "Fantasy" being certified sextuple-platinum by the Recording Industry Association of America (RIAA), Carey's first single to do so. "Fantasy" was the second best-selling single of 1995 in the US, with sales of 1,500,000. It was ranked No. 7 on the Hot 100 year-end charts for 1995, and No. 49 on the 1996 year-end charts. "Fantasy" ranked at No. 15 on the Hot 100's decade-end chart for the 1990s.

In Australia, the song topped the mainstream chart, and was certified triple-platinum by the Australian Recording Industry Association (ARIA). The song also topped the charts in New Zealand, where it was certified 3× platinum by Recorded Music NZ (RMNZ). In Canada, the song debuted on the RPM 100 Hit Tracks at No. 95 on the RPM issue dated October 2, 1995, and reached the top of the chart on November 20, 1995. It was present on the chart for a total of 20 weeks, and No. 18 on the RPM Year-end chart for 1995. "Fantasy" also reached the Top 10 in most of the countries of its release, including across Europe, and the Top 20 on the Oricon chart in Japan. It peaked within the Top 5 of Belgium (Wallonia), Finland, France and the UK, and in the Top 10 in Belgium (Flanders), the Netherlands, Ireland, Norway and Switzerland. "Fantasy" was certified silver in France and 2× platinum in the UK, by the Syndicat National de l'Édition Phonographique (SNEP) and British Phonographic Industry (BPI), respectively; per the Official Charts Company, the single has sold over 400,000 copies in the UK.

== Remixes ==
Carey worked with producer Sean Combs (better known as Diddy, Puffy, Puff Daddy, P. Diddy, etc.), through his label Bad Boy Records, on an official "Bad Boy Remix" for "Fantasy". While Columbia Records had been allowing Carey more leniency with the musicians and producers she was working with, they became hesitant when she featured O.D.B. in the remix for "Fantasy". They feared the sudden change was completely left field for her music, and worried it would jeopardize the album's success. Finally, the Bad Boy remix used guest raps from O.D.B. and background vocals by Puff Daddy. Some of the song's R&B elements were removed for the remix, while the bassline and "Genius of Love" sample were emphasized and the bridge from the original version was used as the chorus. There is a version omitting Ol' Dirty Bastard's verses. The "Bad Boy Fantasy Remix", combines the chorus from the original version and the chorus of the Bad Boy Remix together, removing Ol' Dirty Bastard's vocals from his 2nd verse.

Carey re-recorded vocals for club remixes of the song by David Morales, titled "Daydream Interlude (Fantasy Sweet Dub Mix)." The Bad Boy remix garnered positive reviews from music critics. Ken Tucker from Entertainment Weekly praised the song, claiming its one of the few tracks where Carey "defines herself." Additionally, he complimented the song, writing "At her best, as she is on this clipped, spunky track, Carey is a disco diva for the '90s, a worthy successor to trailblazing women like Donna Summer and Vicki Sue Robinson, R&B singers with an affinity for the endless groove. Disco? No wonder most rock critics can't get behind her. Party on, Mariah." Carey has stated that the Bad Boy remix contributed to over half of the sales of "Fantasy".

On September 24, 2021, American rapper Latto released "Big Energy", which interpolates "Genius of Love", as "Fantasy" did. On March 28, 2022, Latto released the "Big Energy" remix, which features Mariah Carey herself, along with DJ Khaled, which interpolates "Fantasy".

== Music video ==
Carey in the music video of "Fantasy", riding Playland's "Dragon Coaster".

The single's music video was the first that Carey directed entirely on her own. Carey had been open about the fact that she had not been happy with some of her previous music videos. She therefore decided to single-handedly direct the video, so the outcome would be to her exact choosing. Carey said her inspiration for the video was to give off a "free and open feeling," trying to portray the freedom she had finally achieved in being allowed to direct her first video. The video for "Fantasy" debuted on September 7, 1995, at the 1995 MTV Video Music Awards. The video begins with Carey rollerblading in front of the boardwalk entrance at Playland amusement park, located in Rye, New York, and riding the Dragon Coaster, the park's signature wooden coaster. The video continues with various snippets of Carey until the end of the second verse. Afterwards, the video switches to a night time scene that involves people dancing in the parking lot and on top cars.

I'd done a lot of videos and wasn't always a hundred percent thrilled. For the most part, I was never thrilled with the results, so I figured I would give directing a shot. It was a pretty simple concept. Most of the scenes were featured at the amusement park, at a late-night outdoor celebration. I was really happy to be able to include O.D.B. in the remix video.

Following in their actions, Carey joins in the festivities and hops atop a car and begins singing and dancing to the strong bass and R&B beat playing from the stereos. The video also contains a scene involving a lovable young girl who tries to emulate Carey and whose character reappears in the video for Carey's single "Shake It Off" (2005). The video shoot took place in mid-August 1995. In the official video for the song's remix, O.D.B. makes a few cameo appearances with a clown, as well as on the Boardwalk during additional scenes with Carey.

On August 21, 2020, the music video of both versions was re-released in a remastered form, in HD quality. Exactly a year later it was uploaded in 4K resolution.

== Live performances ==
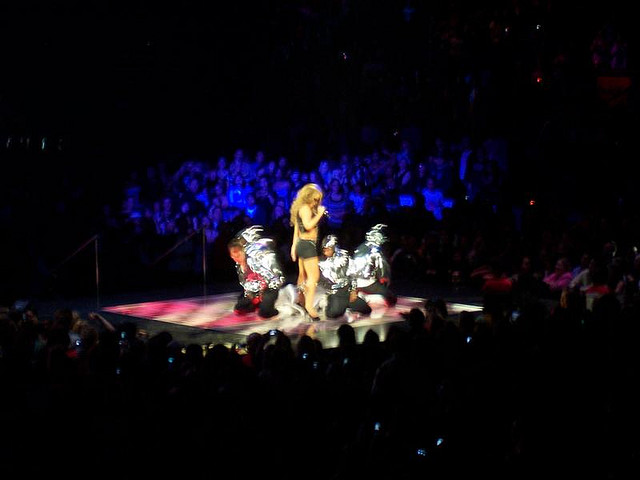
Carey and her dancers performing "Fantasy" on the Adventures of Mimi Tour in 2006

"Fantasy" was performed at the 23rd Annual American Music Awards, where Carey won two of the top awards. For the performance, Carey wore a long black trench coat and matching boots, pants and blouse, and was backed by three background vocalists. Additionally, Carey sang "Fantasy" on the British music chart program Top of the Pops, during a promotional stop in the United Kingdom on September 12, 1995. During its taping, she wore a blue blouse and black jumper. Two days later, Carey appeared on French television where she performed the song alongside several male and female dancers. Carey donned a mid-waist baring white blouse and black leather pants and matching heeled boots. Trey Lorenz and two female back up vocalists were also featured on stage during the show's taping. Aside from live television appearances, the song was performed on several legs of Carey's tours.

"Fantasy" was performed at every show on her Daydream World Tour (1996) set to the album version. The remix version was performed on her Butterfly World Tour (1998), Rainbow World Tour (2000), Charmbracelet World Tour: An Intimate Evening with Mariah Carey (2003–2004), The Adventures of Mimi Tour (2006), The Elusive Chanteuse Show (2014) and Caution World Tour (2019), each of which featured a varying synopsis. Carey performed the remix version in concert for the first time in 1998, placing a large projection screen on to the stage, and featuring snippets and cuts of Ol' Dirty Bastard throughout the video. Additionally, Carey was dressed in blue jeans and a white blouse, and danced several chair routines with several male dancers. She also performed "Fantasy" during the Charmbracelet Tour and Rainbow Tour. The song was featured on the select set-list on three of Carey's live taped shows, Fantasy: Mariah Carey at Madison Square Garden, The Adventures of Mimi, and Around the World.

== Legacy ==
In the mid-1990s Ms. Carey pioneered a subgenre that some people call the thug-love duet. Nowadays clean-cut pop stars are expected to collaborate with roughneck rappers, but when Ms. Carey teamed up with Ol' Dirty Bastard, of the Wu-Tang Clan, for the 1995 hit "Fantasy (Remix)," it was a surprise, and a smash.

— Kelefa Sanneh of The New York Times commenting on the influence and impact of the song's remix.

"Fantasy" exemplified how a music sample could be transformed "into a fully realized pop masterpiece". Due to the success and influence of the song, Carey is credited for introducing R&B and hip hop collaboration into mainstream pop culture, and for popularizing rap as a featuring act through her post-1995 songs. Sasha Frere-Jones, editor of The New Yorker commented in referencing to the song's remix,

"It became standard for R&B/hip-hop stars like Missy Elliott and Beyoncé, to combine melodies with rapped verses. And young white pop stars—including Britney Spears, 'N Sync, and Christina Aguilera—have spent much of the past ten years making pop music that is unmistakably R&B".

Moreover, Jones concludes that "Her idea of pairing a female songbird with the leading male MCs of hip-hop changed R&B and, eventually, all of pop. Although now anyone is free to use this idea, the success of "Mimi" [ref. to The Emancipation of Mimi, her tenth studio album released almost a decade after "Fantasy"] suggests that it still belongs to Carey."

John Norris of MTV News has stated that the remix was "responsible for, I would argue, an entire wave of music that we've seen since and that is the R&B-hip-hop collaboration. You could argue that the "Fantasy" remix was the single most important recording that she's ever made." Norris echoed the sentiments of TLC's Lisa Lopes, who told MTV that it's because of Mariah that we have "Hip-Pop." Judnick Mayard, writer of TheFader, wrote that in regarding of R&B and hip hop collaboration, "The champion of this movement is Mariah Carey." Mayard also expressed that "To this day ODB and Mariah may still be the best and most random hip hop collaboration of all time", citing that due to the record "Fantasy", "R&B and Hip Hop were the best of step siblings."

The song has been featured in multiple films and television shows. In the 1998 film Rush Hour, the character Soo Yong sings the song while it plays on the car radio, shortly before her kidnapping. In 2011, the experimental metal band Iwrestledabearonce used the song at the beginning and end of the video "You Know That Ain't Them Dogs' Real Voices". Indie artist Grimes has called "Fantasy" one of her favorite songs of all-time and has said Mariah is the reason there is a Grimes. In 2019, Carey released a video of her doing a dance to the 'Bad Boy Fantasy' mix on TikTok, thus leading the dance to become another famous TikTok dance challenge, preceding the Obsessed Challenge earlier in the year. A remixed version of the song, with additional vocals from Jodie Comer, features prominently as part of the score and the plot for the 2021 film Free Guy; in the film, Comer's character Molotov Girl catches the attention of Ryan Reynolds's character Guy as she is singing the song, thus catalyzing the rest of the story. Reynolds, who produced and starred in the film, stated that, "I am a huge Mariah Carey fan [...] It really was one of those weird things that happened naturally. I write to music anyway, and I initially put a song in the script by The Outfield called "Your Love". It’s an old '80s tune. It's great, but it just didn’t have that epic scale I was looking for. And then "Fantasy" just came on my playlist and everything clicked in". "Fantasy" was also included on the 2021 edition of Rolling Stone magazine's list of "The 500 Greatest Songs of All Time" at number 419, and in 2022 online magazine Pitchfork named its remix featuring Ol’ Dirty Bastard the best song of the 1990s.

Upon release, "Fantasy" also won many prestigious awards throughout the music industry in 1995 and 1996. At the Blockbuster Entertainment Awards, the song won the award for "Favorite Single." Additionally, the song was awarded the "Pop Award" honor at the 1996 annual American Society of Composers, Authors and Publishers (ASCAP). Carey won the "Dance Record of the Year" award at the "National Dance Music Awards" in 1996. "Fantasy" won two awards at the 1996 "Winter Music Conference National Dance Music Awards," for "Favorite Single" and "Dance Record of the Year." The song won a Broadcast Music Incorporated (BMI) "Pop Song of the Year" award in 1997, as well as the "Favorite Single" award at the annual "Archer Awards." The song also was nominated for Best Female Pop Vocal Performance at the 38th Grammy Awards.

The song was also included in the game Grand Theft Auto VI (GTA 6), released in November 2026.

== Track listing and formats ==
- Worldwide CD single
1. "Fantasy" – 4:04
2. "Fantasy" (Bad Boy) featuring O.D.B. – 4:53
- UK CD maxi-single 1; US CD maxi-single
1. "Fantasy" (Album Version) – 4:06
2. "Fantasy" (Bad Boy Fantasy) – 4:51
3. "Fantasy" (Bad Boy) featuring O.D.B. – 4:52
4. "Fantasy" (Bad Boy Mix) – 4:14
5. "Fantasy" (Def Club Mix) – 11:15
- UK CD maxi-single 2
1. "Fantasy" (MC Mix) – 6:29
2. "Fantasy" (Puffy's Mix) – 4:53
3. "Fantasy" (Puffy's Club Mix) – 4:49
4. "Fantasy" (The Boss Dub) – 8:53
5. "Fantasy" (Sweet Dub Mix) – 8:11
- 2× 12-inch vinyl

A1. "Fantasy" (Def Club Mix) – 11:14
A2. "Fantasy" (MC Mix) – 6:26
B1. "Fantasy" (Puffy's Mix) – 4:51
B2. "Fantasy" (Bad Boy) featuring O.D.B. – 4:52
B3. "Fantasy" (Album Version) – 4:06
C1. "Fantasy" (The Boss Mix) — 8:51
C2. "Fantasy" (Sweet Dub Mix) — 8:11
D1. "Fantasy" (Puffy's Club Mix) — 4:48
D2. "Fantasy" (Bad Boy Mix) — 4:13

- Fantasy EP
1. "Fantasy" (feat. O.D.B.) – 4:53
2. "Fantasy" (feat. O.D.B. - Bad Boy Fantasy) – 4:51
3. "Fantasy" (Bad Boy Mix) – 4:14
4. "Fantasy" (Puffy's Club Mix) – 4:50
5. "Fantasy" (Def Radio Mix) – 3:46
6. "Fantasy" (Def Club Mix) – 11:15
7. "Fantasy" (MC Mix) – 6:28
8. "Fantasy" (The Boss Mix) – 8:52
9. "Fantasy" (Def Drums Mix) – 4:00
10. "Fantasy" (Sweet Dub Mix) – 8:13
11. "Fantasy" (Live at Madison Square Garden – October 1995) – 4:31

== Credits and personnel ==
Credits adapted from the Daydream liner notes.

- Mariah Carey – co-production, songwriting, vocals
- Dave Hall – co-production, songwriting
- Tina Weymouth – songwriting
- Chris Frantz – songwriting
- Steven Stanley – songwriting
- Adrian Belew – songwriting

== Charts ==
=== Weekly charts ===
Weekly chart performance
Chart (1995–1996)	Peak position
Australia (ARIA)	1
Austria (Ö3 Austria Top 40)	13
Belgium (Ultratop 50 Flanders)	9
Belgium (Ultratop 50 Wallonia)	3
Canada Retail Singles (The Record)	1
Canada Contemporary Hit Radio (The Record)	1
Canada Top Singles (RPM)	1
Canada Adult Contemporary (RPM)	2
Canada Dance/Urban (RPM)	1
Croatia (HRT)	1
Denmark (Tracklisten)	5
Europe (Eurochart Hot 100)	4
Europe (European AC Radio)	2
Europe (European Dance Radio)	23
Europe (European Hit Radio)	1
Finland (Suomen virallinen lista)	2
France (SNEP)	5
France Airplay (Music & Media)	1
Germany (Official German Charts)	17
Hungary (MAHASZ)	6
Hungary Airplay (HCRA)	2
Iceland (Íslenski Listinn Topp 40)	17
Ireland (IRMA)	10
Israel (IBA)	2
Italy (Musica e dischi)	9
Italy Airplay (Music & Media)	1
Japan (Oricon)	18
Netherlands (Dutch Top 40)	9
Netherlands (Single Top 100)	10
Netherlands Airplay (BDS)	1
New Zealand (Recorded Music NZ)	1
Norway (VG-lista)	10
Poland Airplay (Music & Media)	6
Scottish Singles Sales (Official Charts)	10
South Africa Airplay (EMA)	1
Spain Airplay (Music & Media)	5
Sweden (Sverigetopplistan)	13
Switzerland (Schweizer Hitparade)	10
UK Singles (Official Charts)	4
UK Hip Hop/R&B (Official Charts)	2
UK Dance Albums (OCC) Import-only 2× 12-inch vinyl	5
UK R&B Albums (Official Charts) Import-only 2× 12-inch vinyl	18
UK Club (Music Week) David Morales/Sean "Puffy" Combs Mixes	1
UK Airplay (BDS)	2
UK Airplay (Media Monitor)	3
US Billboard Hot 100	1
US Adult Contemporary (Billboard)	8
US Adult Pop Airplay (Billboard)	8
US Dance Club Songs (Billboard)	1
US Dance Singles Sales (Billboard)	1
US Hot R&B/Hip-Hop Songs (Billboard)	1
US Pop Airplay (Billboard)	1
US Rhythmic Airplay (Billboard)	1
US Cash Box Top 100	1
US Cash Box Top 100 Urban Singles	1
US Adult Contemporary (Gavin Report)	3
US Top 40 (Gavin Report)	1
US Urban (Gavin Report)	1
US Adult Contemporary (Radio & Records)	15
US CHR/Pop (Radio & Records)	1
US CHR/Rhythmic (Radio & Records)	1
US Hot AC (Radio & Records)	7
US Urban (Radio & Records)	1
US Urban AC (Radio & Records)	16

Weekly chart performance from 2021 to 2022
Chart (2021–22)	Peak position
UK Singles Downloads (Official Charts)	45
UK Dance (Official Charts)	22
US R&B/Hip-Hop Digital Songs (Billboard)	12

=== Year-end charts ===
1995 year-end chart performance
Chart (1995)	Position
Australia (ARIA)	18
Belgium (Ultratop 50 Wallonia)	41
Brazil (Brazilian Radio Airplay)	10
Canada Retail Singles (The Record)	2
Canada Top Singles (RPM)	18
Canada Adult Contemporary (RPM)	37
Canada Dance/Urban (RPM)	5
Europe (Eurochart Hot 100)	27
Europe (European AC Radio)	21
Europe (European Hit Radio)	13
France (SNEP)	24
Hungary Airplay (HCRA)	6
Israel (IBA)	13
Netherlands (Dutch Top 40)	93
Netherlands (Single Top 100)	77
New Zealand (Recorded Music NZ)	4
UK Singles (OCC)	37
UK Airplay (BDS)	14
UK Airplay (Music Week)	22
UK Club Chart (Music Week)	58
US Billboard Hot 100	7
US Dance Club Play (Billboard)	8
US Hot R&B Singles (Billboard)	14
US Top 40/Mainstream (Billboard)	34
US Top 40/Rhythm-Crossover (Billboard)	18
US Cash Box Top 100	21
US Adult Contemporary (Radio & Records)	75
US CHR/Pop (Radio & Records)	31
US CHR/Rhythmic (Radio & Records)	13
US Hot AC (Radio & Records)	40
US Urban (Radio & Records)	33

1996 year-end chart performance
Chart (1996)	Position
US Billboard Hot 100	49
US Hot R&B Singles (Billboard)	86
US Top 40/Mainstream (Billboard)	46
US Top 40/Rhythm-Crossover (Billboard)	29
US CHR/Pop (Radio & Records)	55
US CHR/Rhythmic (Radio & Records)	45

Five-year chart performance
Chart (1993–1998)	Position
US Rhythmic Top 40 (Billboard)	15

=== Decade-end charts ===
Decade-end chart performance
Chart (1990–1999)	Position
Canada (The Record/SoundScan)	7
US Billboard Hot 100	15

== Certifications ==
Certifications for "Fantasy"
Region	Certification	Certified units/sales
Australia (ARIA)	3× Platinum	210,000^{‡}
Denmark (IFPI Danmark)	Gold	45,000^{‡}
France (SNEP)	Gold	250,000^{*}
Japan (RIAJ)	Platinum	100,000^{^}
New Zealand (RMNZ)	4× Platinum	120,000^{‡}
United Kingdom (BPI)	2× Platinum	1,200,000^{‡}
United States (RIAA)	8× Platinum	8,000,000^{‡}
^{*} Sales figures based on certification alone.^{^} Shipments figures based on certification alone.^{‡} Sales+streaming figures based on certification alone.

== Release history ==
Release dates and formats for "Fantasy"
Region	Date	Format(s)	Label	Ref.
United States	August 23, 1995	Radio airplay	Columbia	
Australia	September 11, 1995	Cassette; CD	Columbia	
United Kingdom	September 11, 1995	Cassette; CD	Columbia	
Canada	September 12, 1995	CD	Columbia	
United States	September 12, 1995	7-inch vinyl; 12-inch vinyl; cassette; maxi cassette; CD; maxi CD	Columbia	
Japan	September 21, 1995	Mini CD	Sony Music Japan	
Australia	October 16, 1995	Cassette; CD (remixes)	Columbia	
Various	August 14, 2020	Digital download; streaming (2020 EP)	Columbia	
United States	February 18, 2022	12-inch vinyl (Urban Outfitters exclusive)	Columbia	
