= Forever (Mariah Carey song) =

1996 single by Mariah Carey

Single by Mariah Carey

from the album Daydream
- B-side: "Always Be My Baby" (Dub-A-Baby); "Underneath the Stars"
- Released: June 18, 1996
- Studio: Wallyworld; The Hit Factory (New York City)
- Genre: Rock and roll; pop
- Length: 4:01
- Label: Columbia
- Composers: Mariah Carey; Walter Afanasieff
- Lyricist: Mariah Carey
- Producers: Mariah Carey; Walter Afanasieff

Mariah Carey singles chronology
"Always Be My Baby" (1996)	"Forever" (1996)	"Honey" (1997)

Music video
- "Forever" on YouTube

"Forever" is a rock and roll and pop song recorded by American singer Mariah Carey for her fifth studio album, Daydream (1995). Columbia Records released it to American radio stations for airplay on June 18, 1996, as the album's fifth single. The lyrics, written by Carey, are about one's continued affection despite the end of a romantic relationship. She composed the music and produced the song with Walter Afanasieff. Described by critics as referencing American music of the 1950s and 1960s, "Forever" is a doo-wop-influenced sentimental ballad in the form of a waltz. Its composition includes keyboards, guitars, and programming.

Music critics gave Carey's performance and the composition positive reviews; some viewed the song as unremarkable compared to others on the album. "Forever" reached number nine on the Billboard Hot 100 Airplay chart in the US and number 11 on the RPM Hit Tracks list in Canada. In both countries it achieved the most success on adult contemporary stations. The single entered the bottom half of charts in Australia, New Zealand, and the Netherlands. Carey performed "Forever" during the 1996 Daydream World Tour; her performance at the Tokyo Dome in Japan was released as the music video. Columbia later included the song on Carey's compilation album Greatest Hits (2001).

== Development and composition ==
Before the late 1994 release of her holiday record Merry Christmas, American singer Mariah Carey began conceptualizing her fifth studio album Daydream (1995). She again worked with producer; Walter Afanasieff for the new album's ballads. As collaborators since her debut album Mariah Carey (1990), the pair crafted an adult contemporary sound together.

One of their tracks created for Daydream, "Forever", is a rock and roll and pop song with elements of doo-wop. It is a sentimental ballad with lyrics about continued affection amidst heartbreak: "Forever / You will always be the only one". Composed as a waltz that lasts for four minutes and one second, the track follows 12/8 time signature and moves at a tempo of 63 beats per minute. Carey's vocal range spans two octaves and three semitones from the low note of E♭_{3} to the high note of F♯_{5}. Afanasieff produced "Forever" with Carey; she wrote the lyrics herself and the pair composed the music together. He also played the keyboards, provided synth bass, and programmed the drums and rhythm. Dan Shea and Gary Cirimelli added additional programming while Dann Huff played the guitars. Jay Healy and Dana Jon Chappelle engineered the song at Wallyworld and The Hit Factory in New York, where Andy Smith, Kurt Lundvall, Brian Vibberts, and Mike Scott acted as second engineers. After Mick Guzauski mixed "Forever" at New York's Sony Studios, Bob Ludwig conducted mastering at Gateway Mastering in Portland, Maine.

"Forever"
Critics described "Forever" as having a retro-style composition.

Critics said "Forever" shared similarities with American music from the 1950s and 1960s. According to biographer Chris Nickson, this is displayed by the song's chord changes and prominent guitar arpeggios. In the Jackson Citizen Patriot, Chris Jorgensen judged it as a homage to the Motown sound. Larry Nager of The Commercial Appeal thought the strings resembled those in the 1959 song "Theme from A Summer Place" and Salvatore Caputo of The Arizona Republic said the composition was inspired by Roy Orbison's music. Rick Mitchell viewed it as an "attempt at an old-fashioned R&B ballad" in the Houston Chronicle.

"Forever" was compared to Carey's past work. Nickson perceived similarities with songs from her 1990 debut album, and Billboard specified that the "retro-pop musical setting" recalled her first single "Vision of Love". Writing for the same magazine, Sal Cinquemani considered the string-guitar combination a recurring musical motif in Carey's songs.

== Critical reception ==
Carey's delivery received positive commentary from music critics. Billboard said she "plays the romantic ingenue with convincing, wide-eyed innocence and infectious hope". Magazine contributor Princess Gabbara gauged her as capable of making an emotional impact on listeners. According to Nick Krewen of The Spectator, the song helped her "move beyond the Barbie Doll plasticity of her debutante existence and into the real world of human emotion with truly soulstirring performances".

The composition of "Forever" also received warm reviews. Daina Darzin from Cash Box praised the "lush but unobtrusive orchestration serving as a respectful backdrop" to Carey's vocals. Mitchell and Billboard's Andrew Unterberger viewed it as a successful interpretation of retro styles. Ken Tucker welcomed the waltz tempo in Entertainment Weekly; Pitchfork writer Jamieson Cox said it showed how Carey's Daydream "performances are uniformly strong no matter the context".

Others considered "Forever" an unimpressive album track. Nickson thought it "came across as something of a throwaway". Cleveland.com writer Troy L. Smith said it paled in comparison with the other singles. Jonathan Takiff of the Philadelphia Daily News suggested it was worse than "One Sweet Day" (1995) and "Open Arms" (1995). Carey herself stated in 2015 that she was never "a huge fan of the song" but that it had "grown on her over the years".

"Forever" has appeared on rankings of Carey's music. Smith placed it at number 55 out of 76 in a 2017 list of Carey's best singles. Billboard named it the 100th greatest song of Carey's career in 2020. Writers for BET and Gold Derby thought it was one of her best singles not to reach number one on the US Billboard Hot 100 chart.

== Release and commercial performance ==
"Forever" is the tenth track on Daydream, which was released on September 26, 1995. Columbia Records issued it as the album's fifth single. The label distributed the song to American pop and rhythmic radio stations for airplay on June 18, 1996. It also promoted the song to adult contemporary outlets at the same time. "Forever" lacked a retail release in territories such as Canada, Japan, and the United States. In the lattermost country, singles from the album had already topped the Hot 100 for an unprecedented six months. Unterberger consequently described the release as a victory lap and Smith said it showed how Columbia was "trying to milk the success of Daydream". Critics from music magazines predicted the song would become a success.

Ineligible to chart on the Hot 100 at the time due to its lack of a commercial product, "Forever" instead reached number nine on the Hot 100 Airplay component chart in the United States. It became Carey's 16th top-ten entry and the lowest-peaking of her career at the time aside from the holiday song "All I Want for Christmas Is You" (1994). On both of the Billboard and Radio & Records adult contemporary charts, "Forever" topped out at number two. It also reached number two on the RPM adult contemporary chart in Canada. The single peaked at numbers 11 and 13 on the RPM and The Record multi-format airplay charts, respectively. Elsewhere, "Forever" peaked at number 40 in New Zealand, number 47 in the Netherlands, and number 77 in Australia. In 2001, it was included on Carey's compilation album Greatest Hits.

== Live performances and music video ==
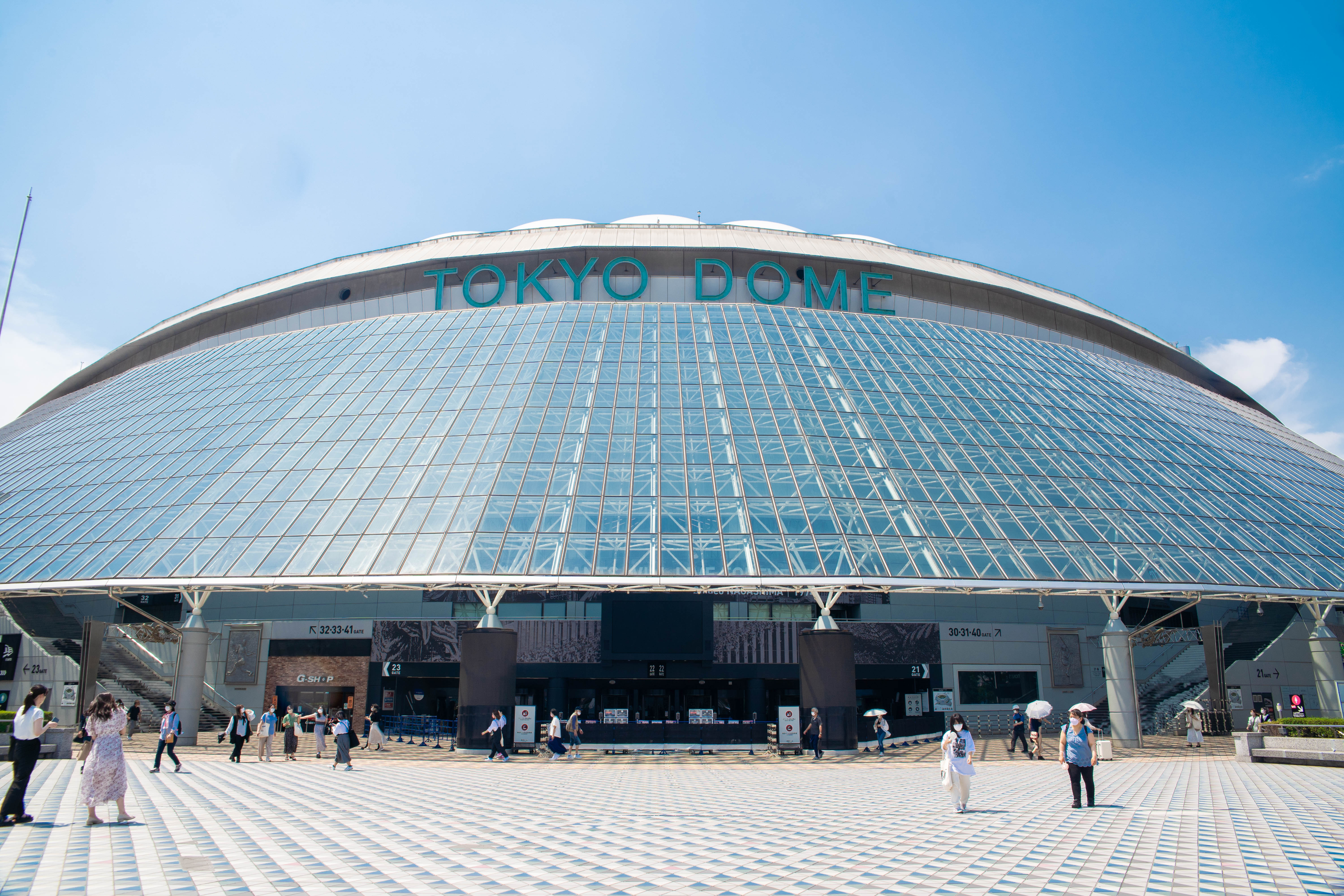
Carey's performance of "Forever" at the Tokyo Dome (pictured) is included on the CD single and video.

Carey performed "Forever" on October 10, 1995, during a concert at Madison Square Garden in New York City. It was included on her video album, Fantasy: Mariah Carey at Madison Square Garden, the next year. She sang it during the Daydream World Tour in 1996. Filming for the official music video occurred five months later during her March shows at the Tokyo Dome in Japan. The live audio was released as a track on the CD single and later on her 2020 compilation album The Rarities. In a review for KQED, Emmanuel Hapsis ranked the video as the third-worst of Carey's career because "concert videos are so lazy."

In 2008, American singer Kristy Lee Cook performed a cover version as a contestant on the seventh season of American Idol. She sang "Forever" in a country music fashion; Rodney Ho of The Atlanta Journal-Constitution likened it to the style of Faith Hill. Some critics derided Cook's vocals though others said she gave a strong rendition.

== Formats and track listing ==
- CD single
1. "Forever" – 4:01
2. "Forever" (Live) – 4:12
- 12-inch vinyl single

A1. "Forever" – 4:01
A2. "Forever" (Live) – 4:12
B1. "Always Be My Baby" (Dub-A-Baby) – 7:13

- CD maxi single 1, cassette maxi single
1. "Forever" – 4:01
2. "Underneath the Stars" – 3:33
3. "Forever" (Live) – 4:12
4. "Make It Happen" (Live) – 4:43
- CD maxi single 2
1. "Forever" – 4:01
2. "Forever" (Live) – 4:12
3. "Always Be My Baby" (Always Club) – 10:25
4. "Always Be My Baby" (ST Dub) – 7:13

== Credits and personnel ==
Recording

- Recorded at Wallyworld and The Hit Factory (New York)
- Mixed at Sony Studios (New York)
- Mastered at Gateway Mastering Studios (Portland, Maine)

Personnel

- Mariah Carey – lyrics, music, producer, arranger, background vocals
- Walter Afanasieff – music, producer, arranger, keyboards, synth bass, drum and rhythm programming
- Dan Shea – additional programming
- Dann Huff – guitars
- Gary Cirimelli – Macintosh, digital and synthesizer programming
- Jay Healy – vocal engineering
- Dana Jon Chappelle – music engineering, additional vocal engineering
- Mick Guzauski – mixing
- Andy Smith – second engineering
- Kurt Lundvall – second engineering
- Brian Vibberts – second engineering
- Mike Scott – second engineering
- Bob Ludwig – mastering

== Charts ==
=== Weekly charts ===
1996–1997 weekly chart performance
Chart (1996–1997)	Peak position
Australia (ARIA)	77
Canada Hit Parade (The Record)	13
Canada Contemporary Hit Radio (The Record)	11
Canada Hit Tracks (RPM)	11
Canada Adult Contemporary Tracks (RPM)	2
Netherlands Single Top 100 (Dutch Charts)	47
Netherlands Tipparade (Stichting Nederlandse Top 40)	4
New Zealand Singles (RIANZ)	40
US Hot 100 Airplay (Billboard)	9
US Adult Contemporary (Billboard)	2
US Adult Top 40 (Billboard)	16
US Top 40/Mainstream (Billboard)	9
US Top 40/Rhythm-Crossover (Billboard)	17
US Adult Contemporary (Radio & Records)	2
US CHR/Pop (Radio & Records)	6
US CHR/Rhythmic (Radio & Records)	17
US Hot AC (Radio & Records)	9

2012 weekly chart performance
Chart (2012)	Peak position
South Korea International Download (Gaon)	97

=== Year-end charts ===
1996 year-end chart performance
Chart (1996)	Position
Canada Hit Tracks (RPM)	98
Canada Adult Contemporary Tracks (RPM)	24
US Hot 100 Airplay (Billboard)	51
US Adult Contemporary (Billboard)	18
US Top 40/Mainstream (Billboard)	54
US Top 40/Rhythm-Crossover (Billboard)	61
US Adult Contemporary (Radio & Records)	10
US CHR/Pop (Radio & Records)	50
US CHR/Rhythmic (Radio & Records)	57
US Hot AC (Radio & Records)	44
