= Underneath the Stars (song) =

1996 single by Mariah Carey

Promotional single by Mariah Carey

from the album Daydream
- A-side: "Forever"
- Released: November 19, 1996
- Recorded: December 1994
- Studio: The Hit Factory (New York, NY); Wallyworld (San Rafael, CA)
- Genre: R&B; soul
- Length: 3:33
- Label: Columbia
- Composers: Mariah Carey; Walter Afanasieff
- Lyricist: Mariah Carey
- Producers: Walter Afanasieff; Mariah Carey

Music video
- "Underneath the Stars" on YouTube

"Underneath the Stars" is a song by American singer-songwriter Mariah Carey. The song was written and produced by Carey and Walter Afanasieff, for her fifth studio album, Daydream (1995). It was released as a promotional single on November 19, 1996, through Columbia Records, and as a B-side to "Forever" in Australia. The R&B-influenced song, which has been considered by Carey as one of her personal favorites, features a soft and retro-style melody and had music critics drawing comparisons to earlier works from Minnie Riperton, one of Carey's vocal inspirations.

Originally planned as the sixth single for Daydream, "Underneath the Stars" was eventually only distributed to radio stations in the United States. However, the song did manage to chart at number sixty-nine on the R&B/Hip-Hop Airplay component chart in 1996, as well as at number thirteen on the R&B Digital Songs chart in 2020. Critically, it was considered one of the best songs on Daydream by music reviewers. A music video was shot in Europe which Carey released on November 13, 2020. The song was included on Greatest Hits (2001), and the Daydream World Tour performance at the Tokyo Dome was later included on The Rarities (2020).

== Background ==
Throughout 1993, Carey began conceptualizing Music Box (1993), which became the highest selling album of Carey's career. For her past two albums, Carey's creative choices were heavily controlled by her label Columbia Records, as well as her husband and CEO of the company, Tommy Mottola. Carey's previous effort, Emotions (1991), drew influence from 1950s, 60s, and 70s balladry, gospel, R&B, and soul music and failed to match the success of her debut album. Following its (comparatively) tepid commercial performance, Columbia aimed for Music Box to be a vehicle for very commercial singles that could garner strong radio airplay. The album was conceptualized as a pop record and was decidedly more mainstream than its predecessor, favoring an Adult Contemporary sound over the Soul and Gospel influences that characterized much of the material on Emotions. As a result, Music Box went on to sell over 28 million copies worldwide and earned its place among the best-selling albums of all time. Due to the album's success, Columbia allowed Carey more control over the music she recorded for Daydream (1995).

Before Carey knew or began searching for the direction she wanted the album to follow, Carey already had the idea and melody for "Underneath the Stars" and felt that it would fit into the album no matter what the eventual sound would be. As such, it became the first song Carey wrote and recorded for the album and served as a sort of tribute to the music which she grew up listening to, as well as one of her main vocal inspirations, Minnie Riperton. "Underneath the Stars" was the first song Carey recorded for her fifth studio album, Daydream (1995). In Australia, the song was released as a B-side to Carey's previous single, "Forever" (1996).

== Composition ==
"Underneath the Stars"
A 21-second sample of the song features a Minnie Ripperton style instrumentation, with '70s soul influences.

"Underneath the Stars" features a "'70s soul vibe," courtesy of the use of a Rhodes piano, as well as synthetic record scratches, in order to the give the song an authentic aged sound. The song also incorporates Carey's usage of double voice, in which she sings the verses in a lower octave and then sings the crescendo and climax in a higher register over it. Carey felt the additions were simple steps taken to further display a contemporary R&B groove and pay homage to the style of Minnie Riperton, who was one of Carey's biggest vocal influences growing up. According to author Chris Nickson, the song has a soft sound and "a lot of texture" and bass shows a more creative side to Carey. While reviewing Daydream, Stephen Holden from The New York Times described the song's double voice, as well as its lyrical content: "'Underneath the Stars,' in which all the voices are Ms. Carey's, achieves the same dissolving synergy between a lyric and entwining vocal lines as she sings: "Beautifully and bittersweetly / You were fading into me."

== Critical reception ==
While not commercially released as a single, "Underneath the Stars" has been lauded with widespread acclaim, becoming one of the album's best-received tracks, with music critics complimenting its instrumentation and vocals. Rolling Stone stated that, "Afanasieff cowrote one of his strongest tunes yet, the sweet, bouncy 'Underneath the Stars.'" Chris Dickinson from St. Louis Post-Dispatch called the song one of Carey's best compositions and wrote "it easily evokes a languid dreamy sensuality with its throbbing bass-line and synthetic record scratches." Writer and journalist Christopher John Farley from Time described "Underneath the Stars" as "cool and blissfully nostalgic," while Cheo H. Coker called it "dynamic but subtle."

== Commercial performance ==
The song was only distributed as a promotional single to radio stations in the United States, where it charted weakly on the US Billboard R&B/Hip-Hop Airplay chart, peaking at number sixty-nine. According to Billboard, due to receiving a "limited number of pressings", the song failed to make an impact on the Hot 100. Additionally, the song made the top-forty on the US Adult R&B Songs chart, peaking at number 35. In 2020, after the release of the EP on streaming services, the song peaked at number thirteen on the US R&B Digital Songs chart.

== Music video ==
=== Background ===
On February 11, 2012, Carey revealed on Twitter that a music video for the song was actually recorded. Filming sessions occurred in England and the Netherlands; Carey commented, however, that the video "never got released & I don't know where it is!" In 2020, during the release of The Rarities and the promotional campaign "MC30", Carey teased the release of the video on an Instagram post captioning it "Work in progress." The video was released on Carey's Vevo account on November 13, 2020.

=== Synopsis ===
The video was filmed during Carey's Daydream promotional trek around the release of the album, with plenty of audience members and behind-the-scenes touring footage along with shots of Carey singing the track in a lavender slip dress in a night time setting. The video is intercut with footage from her 1996 Daydream World Tour.

== Live performances ==
Due to its limited release and chart performance, "Underneath the Stars" was only performed during Carey's Daydream World Tour (1996). During the shows in Japan, Carey featured the song as the tenth track on the set-list. Appearing on stage wearing a long black evening gown, Carey discussed the song's composition and development with the audience, prior to its recital. The live performance from the Tokyo Dome on March 7, 1996 was recorded and released on a rare DVD titled "Mariah Carey Live In Japan" and also featured on Carey's The Rarities.

Carey also performed the song in 2012 in Ischgl (Austria), in Monaco as well as in Morocco and at the 2017 Dubai Jazz Festival.

== Track listing ==
- Promo 12" vinyl/CD single
1. "Underneath the Stars" – 3:33
2. "Underneath the Stars" (Drifting Re-Mix) – 4:00
3. "Underneath the Stars" (Drifting Re-Mix w/o rap) – 4:00
- 2020 digital EP
1. "Underneath the Stars" (Drifting Re-Mix) – 4:00
2. "Underneath the Stars" (Drifting Re-Mix w/o rap) – 4:00
3. "Underneath the Stars" (Sweet A Cappella) – 3:30

== Credits and personnel ==
Credits adapted from the Daydream CD liner notes.

- Mariah Carey – lyricist, vocals, songwriting, producer
- Walter Afanasieff – songwriting, producer, mixing
- Herb Powers – mastering

== Charts ==
Chart (1996)	Peak position
US CHR/Rhythmic (Radio & Records)	39
US R&B/Hip-Hop Airplay (Billboard)	69

Chart (2020)	Peak position
US R&B Digital Songs (Billboard)	13

== Works cited ==
- Nickson, Chris (1998), Mariah Carey revisited: her story, St. Martin's Press, ISBN 978-0-312-19512-0
- Shapiro, Marc (2001). Mariah Carey: The Unauthorized Biography. ECW Press. ISBN 978-1-55022-444-3.
