= Daydream World Tour =

1996 concert tour by Mariah Carey

- Tour by Mariah Carey
- Location: Asia; Europe
- Associated album: Daydream
- Start date: March 7, 1996
- End date: June 23, 1996
- Legs: 2
- No. of shows: 7

Mariah Carey concert chronology
- Music Box Tour (1993); Daydream World Tour (1996); Butterfly World Tour (1998)

The Daydream World Tour was the second concert tour by American singer-songwriter Mariah Carey in support of her fifth studio album Daydream (1995). The tour lasted seven shows, starting on March 7, 1996, in Tokyo (Japan) and ending on June 23 of that same year in London (England).

== Background and development ==
The Daydream World Tour was Carey's second tour (after the U.S. Music Box Tour in 1993), and her first tour to have dates out of the United States. The tour was held in honor of the success of her new album at the time, Daydream; the album had spawned three of Carey's nineteen number-one singles ("Fantasy", "One Sweet Day", and "Always Be My Baby"), became her second album to be certified Diamond in the U.S., selling 10 million copies there and is one of her most critically acclaimed albums. It was also held to promote the album across Europe and Asia.

== Stage ==
The stage set for the tour was perhaps the largest Carey has performed on. It contained three sections: center stage, left flank, and right flank. Center stage contained two platforms where the band and backup singers were situated, a center set of stairs, a curved staircase to the right, a giant screen at the center, a huge chandelier suspended from the ceiling, and a giant cylindrical cage with an elevating platform in the middle for the singer to make her entrance at the start of the show, then moved aside when not needed. The left and right flanks were both the same: they had long runways extending outwards in opposite directions, the walls changed colors throughout the show for ambiance, and at the end were smaller screens so the audience could see Carey performing.

== Concert synopsis ==
The concert began with "Daydream Interlude" (Fantasy Sweet Dub Mix), with Carey being taken down the cage on the elevating platform. She ad libbed the words to the song quietly over the microphone, and the song stopped when she opened the cage's doors, and the lights flicked on and off rapidly as she greeted the audience. The band then started playing "Emotions". The intro to the song was cut in half, and the ending skipped from the last chorus to the famous whistle register notes at the song's end. She then sang her rendition of the Journey classic "Open Arms". The next song she performed was her then-single at the time, "Forever". She moved over to the set of stairs on the right side of center stage and surprised her fans by singing "I Don't Wanna Cry", a move most unexpected, since she has stated that she tries to sing the song as rarely as possible. After her song ended, the band continued playing an instrumental version of the song while Carey was offstage, changing costumes for the next section of the concert.

Music began playing again combining synths and chimes as an extended version of the intro to the lead single of Daydream, "Fantasy". Carey performed the original version of the song, as opposed to singing the Bad Boy Remix of the song as she did during the Butterfly and other later tours. A group of dancers joined Carey during the performance, using the same dance moves seen in the song's music video. She then spoke briefly with the audience, telling them that she wanted them to sing with her during the next song, "Always Be My Baby". The part she taught with them was "Do Do Doop", and told them that it was a competition between each section of the stadium on who could sing it the loudest. She then presented her band members and exited the stage to change outfits yet again while the band performed the Rufus & Chaka Khan hit "Ain't Nobody". The lights dimmed to a dark blue and purple color, and on screen appeared stock footage of Boyz II Men from the Fantasy: Mariah Carey at Madison Square Garden concert in October 1995. The band began playing "One Sweet Day." Because of schedule conflicts between Carey and Boyz II Men, the group was unable to tour with her, so during the song at all the concerts, Boyz II Men's parts from the album cut were played over the speakers and footage of them appeared on the center screen, while Carey continued to sing live.

After the song was over, the curtains fell, and Carey sang her "favorite song from the new album", "Underneath the Stars", followed by her rendition of the Badfinger song "Without You". She was then accompanied by the Chapel of Hope Choir in singing "Make It Happen". After the lights went down at the end of the song, she left the stage for yet another costume change. The lights suddenly flickered on, and an R&B/dance instrumental played, while a dancer appeared and started breakdancing. He was then joined by a group of other dancers, followed by Carey, who began singing a cover of The SOS Band's "Just Be Good to Me". She sang "Dreamlover" and then left the stage for one final costume change.

A familiar synth intro started playing, and Carey began singing her first single, "Vision of Love" as she appeared at the top of the winding staircase. She continued singing as she slowly made her way down the stairs. Once the song was over, she sang her signature song, "Hero". The last song of the show, "Anytime You Need a Friend", she dedicated to the audience. She was accompanied once again by the Chapel of Hope choir and started with the album version. She then surprised the audience by transitioning into the more upbeat C&C Remix version of the song, and she exited the stage via the spiraling staircase, while the choir, band and dancers continued the song, thus ending the concert. For the Tokyo Dome concerts, following the performance of "Anytime You Need a Friend", Carey would return to the stage and perform her biggest Japanese hit, "All I Want for Christmas Is You", as an encore for her fans. Footage of the home video version of the music video played, while she wore the red dress and go-go boots from the black-and-white 1960s music video. She exited the stage through the elevator cage, ending the concert with one last kiss to her fans over the microphone.

== Broadcasts and recordings ==
The performance of “Forever” at the Tokyo Dome is the official music video for that song. The video took footage from the performance, and is intercut with black-and-white footage of Carey exploring Japan that was handpicked by the singer. Carey announced during the Rotterdam Ahoy concert that the performance of “Underneath the Stars” would be the official music video for the song. Still, that video would never be officially released until 2020, when the footage for the video was found, after having been lost for many years prior.

The performances from “Fantasy”, “Always Be My Baby”, “Underneath the Stars”, “Make It Happen”, “Dreamlover”, “Hero” and “Anytime You Need a Friend” from the Tokyo Dome concerts were used in the 1996 Fox special Mariah Carey: New York to Tokyo. Her performance of “All I Want for Christmas Is You”, also from those same concerts, would later be uploaded in high definition onto Carey's VEVO channel on 3 December 2019.

The audio of the Tokyo Dome show was released on Carey's The Rarities album on 2 October 2020. A complete high-definition recording of the Tokyo Dome show, titled Live at the Tokyo Dome, was later released as a bonus Blu-ray disc on the physical Japanese release of The Rarities, as well as a standalone VOD release worldwide.

== Set list ==
1. "Daydream Interlude" (Fantasy Sweet Dub Mix) (Introduction)
2. "Emotions"
3. "Open Arms"
4. "Forever"
5. "I Don't Wanna Cry"
6. "Fantasy"
7. "Always Be My Baby"
8. "Ain't Nobody" (Band introductions)
9. "One Sweet Day"
10. "Underneath the Stars"
11. "Without You"
12. "Make It Happen"
13. "Just Be Good to Me"
14. "Dreamlover"
15. "Vision of Love"
16. "Hero"
17. "Anytime You Need a Friend"
18. "Anytime You Need a Friend" (C+C Club Mix) [Outro]

Notes:

- "All I Want for Christmas Is You" was performed as the encore in Japan.

== Shows ==
List of concerts, showing date, city, country, and venue
Date	City	Country	Venue	Attendance	Revenue
Asia
March 7, 1996	Tokyo	Japan	Tokyo Dome	150,000 / 150,000 (100%)	—N/a
March 10, 1996	Tokyo	Japan	Tokyo Dome	150,000 / 150,000 (100%)	—N/a
March 14, 1996	Tokyo	Japan	Tokyo Dome	150,000 / 150,000 (100%)	—N/a
Europe
June 14, 1996	Frankfurt	Germany	Festhalle	—N/a	—N/a
June 17, 1996	Rotterdam	Netherlands	Rotterdam Ahoy	—N/a	—N/a
June 20, 1996	Paris	France	Palais Omnisports de Paris-Bercy	—N/a	—N/a
June 23, 1996	London	England	Wembley Arena	—N/a	—N/a

== Personnel ==
- Walter Afanasieff – musical director, piano, organ
- Randy Jackson – bass
- Dan Shea – keyboards
- Vernon Black – guitar
- Gregory "Gigi" Gonoway – drums
- Peter Michael Escovedo – percussion
- Melonie Daniels – background vocals
- Kelly Price – background vocals
- Deborah Cooper – background vocals
- Cindi Mizelle - background vocals
- Shanrae Price – background vocals
