= Breakup song =

Type of song

A breakup song is a song describing the breakup of an intimate relationship, with associated emotions of sadness, frustration, anger, and sometimes of acceptance, relief, or even liberation. As one source states (discussing the upbeat breakup song "Better Things" by The Kinks), "Pop music is littered with break-up masterpieces", but "[i]t's a rare break-up song that isn't bitter".

Listening to breakup songs during a breakup can help the listener to experience a sense of catharsis. For example, songwriter Phil Collins notes that "People hate a break-up, but they love a break-up song. "Against All Odds" pins down how it feels to be broken-hearted, and it's one of the songs most often mentioned when people write to me, describing how it helped them through the trauma of heartbreak".

== Genres and styles ==
Breakup songs can be found in every genre of music. For example, "You Oughta Know" by Alanis Morissette is categorized as alternative rock and post-grunge; "Tainted Love", originally composed by Ed Cobb and recorded as a soul music track by Gloria Jones in 1964, attained worldwide fame after being covered by Soft Cell in 1981 as a synthpop/new wave song; "I Will Survive", popularized by Gloria Gaynor, has been described as a "disco anthem"; and "Achy Breaky Heart", popularized by Billy Ray Cyrus, is a country/rockabilly song. Some musicians are particularly well known for having written or recorded a large number of breakup songs; for example, Taylor Swift, whose penchant for the genre has been the subject of examination.

The nature and style of breakup songs also changes over time. One source contends that "1960s charts were full of tragic break-up songs, whereas by the 1990s these were a rarity – which may indicate that, contrary to its in-your-face aerobics'n'attitude bluster, 1990s pop is more emotionally repressed". In many instances, breakup songs "spring from biographical material", with songwriters using the medium to record their own feelings about a breakup. Breakup songs can also reflect specific phases of a breakup, including feelings of estrangement between the partners before the actual breakup, describing the breakup itself, and describing feelings in the aftermath of the breakup.

== Best and best-selling breakup songs ==
A number of different media sources have sought to list the "best" breakup songs, with efforts to accomplish this reaching very different results. For example The Ringer found the best breakup song to be "Purple Rain" by Prince, followed by "You Oughta Know" by Alanis Morissette and "I Can't Make You Love Me" by Bonnie Raitt, while a list on the same topic by Time Out yielded a completely different top three, "I'd Rather Go Blind" by Etta James, "Somebody That I Used to Know" by Elliott Smith (a different song from the 2011 Gotye song of the same name), and the 1992 Whitney Houston version of "I Will Always Love You". Similarly, Billboard produced yet another list, topped by "All Too Well" by Taylor Swift, "Dancing on My Own" by Robyn, and "I Want You Back" by The Jackson 5.

The all-time best-selling single of a breakup song is the 1992 Whitney Houston version of "I Will Always Love You", which sold over 20 million copies. The song had originally been written and recorded in 1973 by American singer-songwriter Dolly Parton, and topped the country charts in 1974. It was written as a farewell to her one-time partner and mentor of seven years, Porter Wagoner, following Parton's decision to pursue a solo career. Other high-selling breakup songs include "Un-Break My Heart" by Toni Braxton in 1996 (10 million copies), "Believe" by Cher in 1998 (10 million copies) and "Careless Whisper" by George Michael in 1984 (6 million copies). Best-selling digital singles include "Somebody That I Used to Know" by Gotye featuring Kimbra in 2011 (13 million copies), "Hello" by Adele in 2015 (12.3 million copies), and "Love Yourself" by Justin Bieber in 2016 (11.7 million copies).

== See also ==
- Love song
