= Brian Tarquin discography =

This is a select discography for Brian Tarquin, the American guitarist who has recorded and produced numerous albums featuring solo guitar, smooth jazz, as well as charitable compilations in collaboration with various artists.

== Albums ==
Brian Tarquin discography
- Studio albums: 15
- Compilation albums: 22
- Singles: 10

Year	Album	Radio	Label	Notes
Solo albums
1996	Ghost Dance	-	Jazz Inspiration/MCA Canada	Tarquin's first commercially released solo instrumental guitar album
1997	Last Kiss Goodbye	#4 NAC	Instinct Records	Topped R&R Charts at #4 on NAC/Smooth Jazz Radio with the songs "One Arabian Knight" and "Freeway Jam"
1999	Soft Touch	#10 NAC	Instinct Records	Topped R&R Charts at #10 with the songs "Darlin' Darlin' Baby" and "Tangled Web"
2001	High Life	Top 20 NAC	Instinct Records	Final album with Instinct Records featuring the tracks "Riders On The Storm" and "Charlemagne"
2002	Sanctuary	Top 10 UK	Passion Records	UK compilation release of Tarquin's past radio hits from Instinct Records (1996-2001)
2008	Fretworx	-	BHP Music-Guitar Trax Records	Dedicated to the 911 survivors. Tarquin goes back to his rock-fusion roots which features a number of iconic guitar guests like Steve Morse, Billy Sheehan and Frank Gambale
2009	Brian Tarquin Collection (1996-2008)	Top 10 NAC	BHP Music-Guitar Trax Records	A collective work of past radio hits featuring two new (2008) bonus tracks: "Solidarity" and "Yorkville"
2014	Brian Tarquin & Heavy Friends: Guitars for Wounded Warriors	-	Purple Pyramid/Cleopatra Records	Features guests Billy Sheehan, Steve Morse, Ron 'Bumblefoot' Thal, Gary Hoey, Hal Lindes and Reb Beach. Those military soldiers who have fought for our country inspired the music. Partial Proceeds go to the Fisher House Foundation. Received the 2016 Independent Music Award Nomination for Best Compilation Album
2014	Smooth Jazz Cafe	-	Purple Pyramid/Cleopatra Records	Produced, composed and performed by Tarquin featuring guests Chuck Loeb, Hal Lindes (Dire Straits) and Denny Jiosa
2017	Orlando In Heaven	#6 on Relix Jam Band radio chart	Purple Pyramid/Cleopatra Records	Produced, composed and performed by Tarquin featuring guests Larry Coryell, Mike Stern, Phil Naro, Hal Lindes, Bobby Baldwin, Tony Franklin, Chris Poland, Will Ray and Denny Jiosa.
2017	Band of Brothers	#21 on Metal Contraband Chart	Purple Pyramid/Cleopatra Records	Produced, composed and performed by Tarquin featuring guests Steve Morse, Ron 'Bumblefoot' Thal, Phil Naro, Jeff Scott Soto, Gary Hoey, Tina Guo, Tony Franklin, Joel Hoekstra, Jeff Watson and Trey Gunn.
2020	Vegas Blue	-	BHP Music-Guitar Trax Records, LLC	Featuring guest artists Steve Morse, Trey Gunn, Ron 'Bumblefoot' Thal, Phil Naro, Hal Lindes and Tony Carey
2023	Brothers In Arms	#7 on the NACC Loud Rock charts and #11 on the Metal Contraband charts	BHP Music-Guitar Trax Records, LLC	Featuring guest artists Joe Satriani, Vinnie Moore (UFO), Ron ‘Bumblefoot’ Thal (Guns 'N' Roses), Alex De Rosso (Dokken), Travis Stever (Coheed & Cambria), Jeff Duncan (Armored Saint), Johannes Weik (Son of a Bach), Gerald Gradwohl (Tangerine Dream), Chris Haskett (Henry Rollins Band).
2024	Beyond The Warrior's Eyes	#1 Fusion Album on Roots Music Reports and #5 on Relix Jam Band radio chart	BHP Music-Guitar Trax Records, LLC	Featuring guest artists Jean Luc Ponty, Eric Johnson, Robben Ford (Miles Davis), Steve Morse (Deep Purple), Dean Brown (David Sanborn), Hal Lindes (Dire Straits), Chris Poland (Megadeth), John Tropea (Billy Cobham), Steve Kindler (Jeff Beck), Carl Verheyen (Supertramp), Larry McCray (John Mayall), the late Phil Naro, and the Budapest Symphony Orchestra.
Asphalt Jungle
2002	Electro Ave.	-	ROIR Records	First album delving in the "rocktronica" field featuring the MTV theme music from 'Road Rules'
2005	Enjoy This Trip	Top 40 CMJ	Hypnotic/Cleopatra Records	Features track "Bob Marley vs. Asphalt Jungle – Don't Rock The Boat"
2006	Junglization	#25 CMJ	Bohemian Productions	Drum 'n' Bass influenced with tracks like "Wicked Jack" and "In My Blood"
2007	Bob Marley Remixed	-	Bohemian Productions	Features remixes of Bob Marley classics like "Mr. Brown", "Kaya" and "Move"
Jazz compilations
1997	The Best of Acid Jazz, Vol. 2	#23 Billboard	Instinct Records	Compilation featured "Arrow of Truth", and charted Top 20 on the Billboard Contemporary Jazz Albums
1998	Sweet Emotions	Top 20 NAC	Instinct Records	Compilation featured the song "Last Kiss Goodbye"
1998	Smooth Moods	Top 10 UK	Jazz FM Records	Compilation featured the song "Freeway Jam"
1998	Welcome to the Jazz Café	Top 20 NAC	Instinct Records	Compilation featured the song "Summer Nights"
1999	Sweet Emotions: Smooth Jazz Romance	Top 40 NAC	Instinct Records	Compilation featured the vocal song "Rainfall"
1999	Bossa Brava: Caliente!	-	Instinct Records	Compilation featured the song "Vampirella"
1999	The Best of Smooth Jazz Blues	-	Instinct Records	Compilation featured the vocal song "Lately"
1999	This is Smooth Jazz	Top 10 NAC	Instinct Records	Compilation featured the song "Tangled Web"
1999	Smooth Jazz Radio Hits, Vol. 1	Top 4 NAC	Instinct Records	Compilation featured the song "One Arabian Knight"
2000	Smooth Jazz Radio Hits, Vol. 2	Top 20 NAC	Instinct Records	Compilation featured the song "Freeway Jam"
2000	Pacific Coast Highway	Top 10 UK	Jazz FM Records	Compilation featured the song "Achilles"
2000	This Is Smooth Jazz: Love Bossa Style	-	Instinct Records	Compilation featured the song "Tabatha"
2001	This Is Smooth Jazz: The Box Set	-	Instinct Records	Compilation featured the song "Crazy Horse"
2001	Smooth Operators: Great Smooth Jazz Moments	Top 10 NAC	Instinct Records	Compilation featured the songs "Darlin' Darlin' Baby" and "Charlemagne"
Rock compilations
2007	Guitar Masters, Vol. 1	-	Bohemian Productions	Compilation featuring Jeff Beck, Joe Satriani and Zakk Wylde, along with Tarquin's track "Jack Hammer". Produced by Tarquin
2008	Led Zeppelin Salute: Get the Led Out!	-	Bohemian Productions	Compilation featuring rarity tracks from Jimmy Page, along with Tarquin's remake of "Dazed and Confused". Produced by Tarquin
2008	Jeff Beck Salute: El Becko	-	BHP Music-Guitar Trax Records	Compilation featuring Tarquin's remake of "You Know What I Mean", "Blue Wind" and "Play With Me". Produced by Tarquin
2009	Jimi Hendrix Tribute: Third Stone From The Sun	-	BHP Music-Guitar Trax Records	Compilation featuring Tarquin's remake of "Third Stone From The Sun" and "Purple Haze". Produced by Tarquin
2009	Eric Clapton Salute: I Feel Free	-	Bohemian Productions	Compilation featuring Tarquin's remake of "Sunshine of Your Love". Produced by Tarquin
2009	Stevie Ray Vaughan Tribute: Lenny	-	Bohemian Productions	Compilation featuring Tarquin's remake of "The House Is Rockin'". Produced by Tarquin
2009	Guitar Masters, Vol. 2	-	Bohemian Productions	Compilation featuring Jimmy Page, Carlos Santana, and B.B. King, along with Tarquin's tracks "Towers" and "Jungle Room Boogie". Produced by Tarquin
2010	Guitar Masters, Vol. 3 & 4: Les Paul Dedication	-	Bohemian Productions	Most of the music is new that Tarquin produced, composed and performed with Gary Hoey, Chris Poland, Hal Lindes and Chuck Loeb. Bonus tracks featuring Jeff Beck, Les Paul Trio, Steve Vai and Alan Holdsworth.
