= Brian Tarquin =

American guitarist (born 1965)

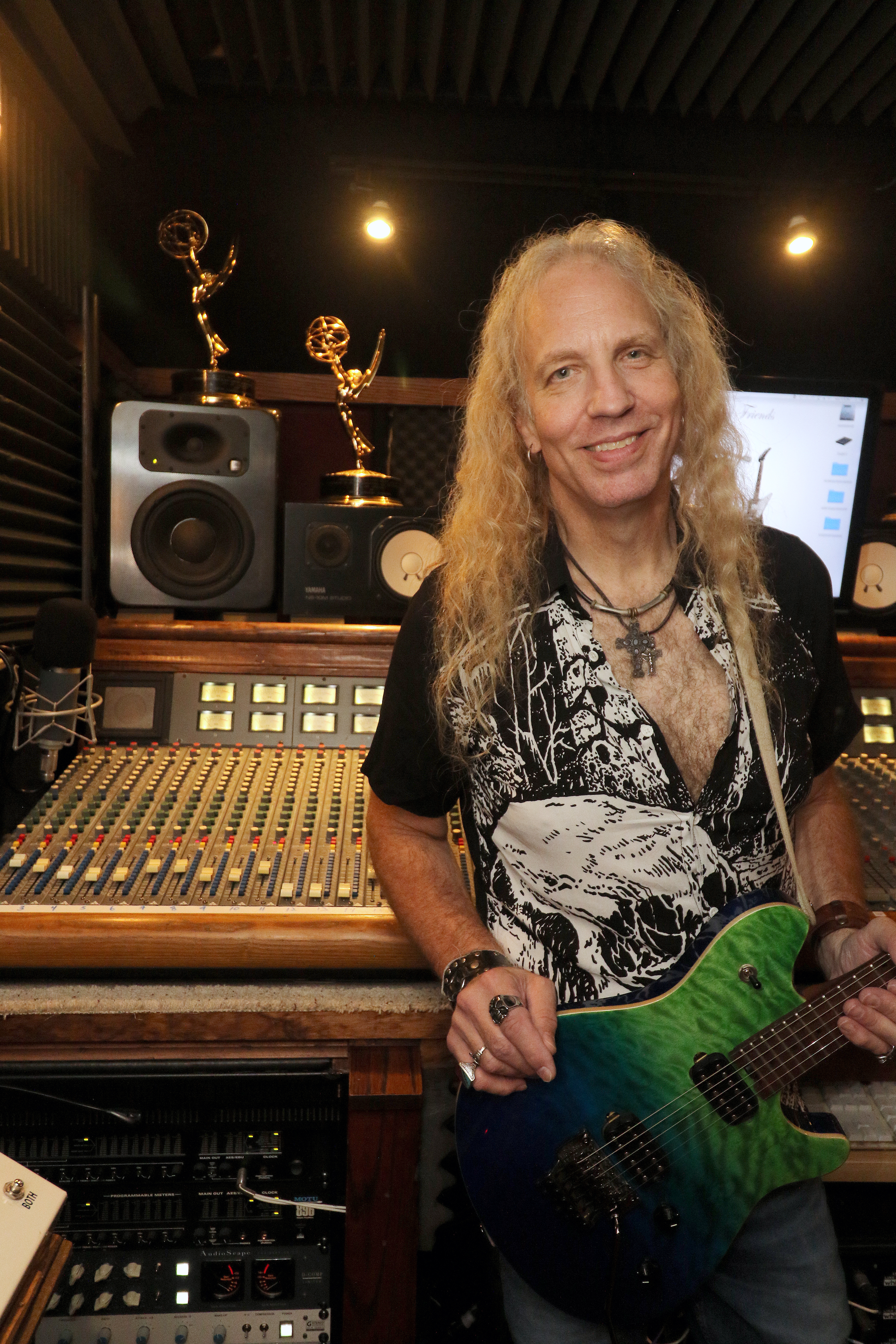
- Tarquin at work in his Jungle Room Studios, in Florida. Behind him are Emmys he's won in 2002, 2003, 2005 for his work in All My Children.

Background information
- Born: December 2, 1965 (age 60); New York City, New York, U.S.
- Genres: Jazz fusion; smooth jazz; instrumental rock; hard rock; electronica; progressive rock; acid jazz
- Occupations: Guitarist, composer, producer
- Instruments: Guitar, keyboards, bass
- Years active: 1989–present
- Labels: Jazz inspiration/MCA, Instinct, Pyramid, Hypnotic, Cleopatra, Nu Groove, BHP
- Member of: Asphalt Jungle, artists associated with: Larry Coryell, Joe Satriani, Steve Morse, Eric Johnson, Jean-Luc Ponty, Vinnie Moore, Ron "Bumblefoot" Thal, Robben Ford, Mike Stern, Jeff Beck, Gary Hoey, Billy Sheehan, Hal Lindes, Chris Poland, Chuck Loeb.
- Website: briantarquin.com

Brian Tarquin (born December 2, 1965) is an American jazz fusion guitarist, recording artist, sound engineer, record producer, and composer. He is best known as a guitar instrumentalist with several Top 10 radio hits in various genres as smooth jazz, NACC Loud Rock, jam band, Roots Music Report, Radio Contraband, and CMJ charts. He also is an established composer, having won Emmy awards for "Outstanding Achievement in Music Direction and Composition for a Drama Series". He owns BHP Music-Guitar Trax Records and Jungle Room Studios which specializes in guitar instrumental music. He specializes in guitar instrumental music and smooth jazz. Throughout his career he has recorded with and produced projects with Larry Coryell, Joe Satriani, Eric Johnson, Jean-Luc Ponty, Robben Ford, Gary Hoey, Hal Lindes, Chuck Loeb, Steve Morse, Billy Sheehan, Ron "Bumblefoot" Thal, Leslie West, and Mike Stern.

== Early life and education ==
Brian Tarquin was born in New York City on December 2, 1965. He is the son of Albanian American abstract artist Pema Browne and Irish American disc jockey/literary agent Perry Joseph Browne. Tarquin grew up on the upper east side in the apartment building named Park Lane Towers that later became the backdrop on the weekly opener for the popular 1970's sitcom, "The Jeffersons". He attended such prestigious private schools as the Trinity School (where Humphrey Bogart and Truman Capote studied) and Saint David's School (New York City) where John F. Kennedy Jr. graduated. At Saint David's, Robert Chambers was one of Brian's classmates. He studied music composition at the Mannes College of Music and attended SUNY New Paltz in the mid-1980s. After college Tarquin attended the defunct Center for Media Arts in the Chelsea district to study audio engineering and music production. Tarquin spent a short stint in the Army ROTC during his time in college, doing basic training in Fort Knox, TN.

== Professional career ==
=== Early career ===
After audio production school, Tarquin worked as an assistant engineer for New York's Electric Lady Studios and then at Far & Away Studios, owned by Geoff Gray in Goshen, New York. The studio was in a 200-year-old barn with a huge old fireplace and cobwebbed wooden slatted walls. Geoff was a mentor and became a lifelong friend of Tarquin. After about a year Brian went to work as an assistant engineer and sales rep for Look & Company, a 5th Avenue jingle house in the Flatiron district. This was the next stage of his career where he discovered music production libraries and started to compose for them.

This propelled Brian to move to California as he states in his book, Survival Guide for Music Composers (Hal Leonard Publishing), "Los Angeles offered me what I could not get in New York, the accessibility to the music industry and as it turned out film and television production companies who needed music." Upon arriving in L.A., he started working at the advertising agency Ogilvy & Mather on Wilshire Blvd. by the La Brea tar pits producing music for Barbie commercials. Brian then worked as an assistant engineer at Powerhouse Studios in the San Fernando Valley, while at night performing at The Roxy Theatre (West Hollywood), The Whisky a Go Go on Sunset, and The Baked Potato in Studio City. Tarquin went on to work at various record labels as Restless Records and Virgin Records in radio promotion and finance. He was living in Hollywood at the time, at the famous historical building 1764 N. Sycamore between Franklin and Hollywood Blvd. in Jim Morrison's old apartment. Morrison used the apartment to escape from his Hollywood Hills home from the groupies to write poetry. The building as a whole was a Rock N Roll historic monument reeking of the 1960s, where bands like The Rolling Stones and Paul Revere & The Raiders rented apartments. By 1994, Tarquin made the big switch from rock fusion to contemporary jazz instrumental after being inspired by the Acid Jazz movement from London in the mid-'90s.

=== Composer ===
In 1991 Tarquin started to compose music for the production company James & Astor in New York City. Subsequently, Tarquin's music was used for the 1992 and 1994 Winter Olympics on CBS television. During this time, Brian recorded the track "Hollywood Shuffle" which was used on the popular show, Beverly Hills, 90210. He recalls, "I remember seeing my music used for the first time on that show, what a rush, they played it loads of times, it must of ran morning noon and night for the promos." He went on to compose for Marc Ferrari's production company called Red Engine Music, later to become MasterSource Music, getting various placements on television and film projects. In 1994 Tarquin's song, "What It Is", which would later appear on his debut solo album Ghost Dance, was used on the Spelling TV show Models Inc. In 1997 in partnership with programmer/keyboardist Chris Ingram, he delved into rock electronica music and wrote the theme music for MTV's Road Rules for Seasons 7 and 8 along with many of the shows cues. He had a long relationship with Bunim/Murray Productions composing music for "Real World" and the original series "Making the Band" airing on ABC-TV in 2000. For ten years Tarquin composed for All My Children working with music supervisor Terry Walker resulting in receiving two Television Academy Emmy Awards for his work on the show and 6 nominations. In 2000 he composed for Paramount's show "Resurrection Blvd." the dramatic series which aired on Showtime. Tarquin composed the opening music and various score for the 2002 film "The First $20 Million Is Always the Hardest" directed by Mick Jackson. In 2019 Tarquin released Soundtracks I and Soundtracks II on his label BHP Music-Guitar Trax Records showcasing the musical highlights of his career in film and television.

Tarquin has composed many successful projects for production music libraries as First Com, Killer Music, MasterSource, Megatrax, 5th Floor Music, Sonoton and APM. He has provided musical scores for the films The Watcher (Keanu Reeves), Desert Heat (Jean-Claude Van Damme), The Sender (R. Lee Ermey), and National Lampoon's Repli-Kate (Ali Landry) and Chill Factor (Cuba Gooding Jr.) as well as scoring for television in episodes of 24, Alias, America's Next Top Model, Beverly Hills 90210, Cheers, CSI: Crime Scene Investigation, Extra, The Watcher, Friends, Grey's Anatomy, Making the Band, Malcolm in the Middle, Melrose Place, Seinfeld, The Simpsons, TMZ on TV, and Sex and the City.

=== Producer and recording engineer ===
Tarquin produced the Guitar Masters Series from the Jungle Room Studios, which featured guitarists Jeff Beck, Steve Vai, Jimmy Page, Steve Morse, Gary Hoey, Santana, Billy Sheehan, B. B. King, Frank Gambale, Leslie West, Chris Poland, Hal Lindes, and Joe Satriani.

In 2006 Tarquin launched his own record label, BHP Music/Guitar Trax, and released personal projects and a series of Guitar Masters compilations. The label has produced many social awareness themed albums for September 11, Veterans programs, the Pulse Nightclub Massacre, and the Mandalay Bay shooting. BHP Music/Guitar Trax releases have raised funds for Hope for the Warriors, Fisher House Foundation, and Catholic Charities of Central Florida.

In 2012 he founded TV Film Trax, a music production catalog which by 2016—when it was sold to a private investor—included more than 2,000 songs by a variety of composers for television, and from which editors, music supervisors, producers, or directors can easily access tracks for their productions.

In 2020 Tarquin signed an exclusive worldwide distribution deal with APM and Sonoton Music for film and television representation for his catalog 1st Choice Music featuring many guitarists.

=== Guitarist and performer ===
==== Smooth Jazz 1990s ====
In 1995 Tarquin entered into a recording deal with the Canadian label, Jazz Inspiration distributed by MCA. In 1996 his debut album Ghost Dance was released spurring Tarquin to support the album by touring with acts like Chuck Loeb and Dave Koz in the California jazz festival market.

In 1997 Tarquin was signed to a three-record deal with the New York acid jazz label Instinct Records. His first success in the market was the track "Arrow of Truth", which appeared on the release This Is Acid Jazz, Vol. 2 charting Top 20 on the Billboard Contemporary Jazz charts.

The following year he was flown to London to record and work with acid jazz producer Ernie McKone for his album Last Kiss Goodbye, It garnered several hits at smooth jazz radio, "One Arabian Knight", "Freeway Jam" (Jeff Beck cover), "Midnight Blue" and "57th Street". The album charted #4 at the R&R and Gavin charts. Tarquin's follow up album was the 1999 release Soft Touch which again paired him up with Ernie McKone in London at Boogie Back Studios. The album produced the smooth jazz radio hits "Darlin' Darlin' Baby" (O'Jay's cover), "Tangled Web", and the vocal song "Rainfall". Soft Touch would chart #9 on the R&R and Gavin charts. His final album with Instinct Records was the 2001 release High Life. which was produced by Chris Ingram recorded in New York and Los Angeles. The album generated radio classics as "Riders on the Storm" (Doors cover), "Celtic Tales" and "Charlemagne". In 2002 Passion Jazz label released a compilation of Tarquin's music called Sanctuary.

In 2005, with Chris Ingram, they created the successful Megabeats Series among other productions including Downtempo Drama Vol. 1 for Megatrax Productions in Los Angeles. In 2008, Tarquin released Fretwork for NuGroove Records. This included Brian Tarquin Collection (1996-2008), El Becko (Jeff Beck tribute), and Third Stone From the Sun (Jimi Hendrix tribute).

==== Asphalt Jungle ====
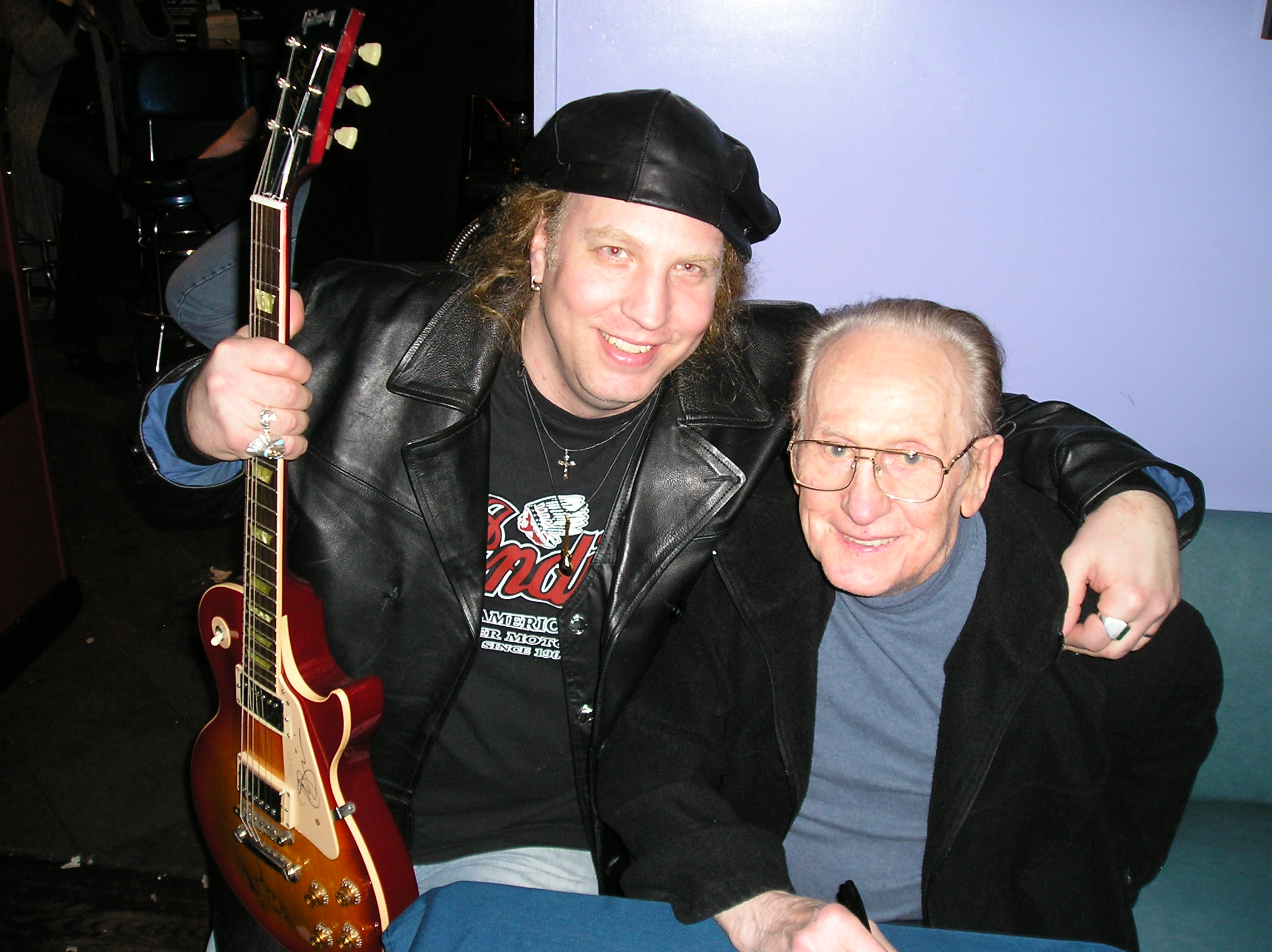
Tarquin with Les Paul

In the late-1990s, Tarquin founded the band Asphalt Jungle with keyboardist and programmer Chris Ingram, and in 2002 released their debut album Electro Ave., on ROIR Records featuring "The Road Rules". The track "Witchcraft", from Asphalt Jungle's 2002 album Electro Ave., became the theme song to MTV's 1998 season of Road Rules.

In 2005 Enjoy This Trip was released. Jungilzation (2006), was released by Cleopatra Records and featured the theme song "Tekken" from MTV's Road Rules Season 8. "Semester at Sea", charting Top 40 on the CMJ RPM charts. In 2006 Jungilzation and Bob Marley Remixed were released on Tarquin's label BHP Music-Guitar Trax Records distributed by Redeye. Jungilzation charted #25 on the CMJ RPM charts. The band dismantled, but after a long hiatus in 2018 Tarquin revived Asphalt Jungle as solo project and released an experimental album of heavy metal dubstep with Crazy Train.

During the pandemic lock down in 2020, Tarquin delved into the Lofi Jazz genre with his alter ego Asphalt Jungle. Persuaded by Rod Linnum aka "LoFi Rod", a fan of Brian's early Smooth Jazz releases, Tarquin successfully entered into the new format releasing a host of new singles through DashGo distribution. Brian states, "Lofi really reminds me of the Acid Jazz days when we were combining hip hop grooves with jazz progressions and overtones; adding cool horn riffs with clean guitar octaves ala Wes Montgomery". Singles as "Magna Fi", "Sunshine in Her Eyes", "Acid Test" are popular among Spotify Studybeat lists.

==== Rock Instrumental (2008 - Present) ====
In 2008, Tarquin released his first rock instrumental solo album called Fretwork featuring Steve Morse, Billy Sheehan, Frank Gambale, Max Middleton, Randy Coven, Will Ray, Andy Timmons, Hal Lindes and Chuck Loeb. It was dedicated to the 911 victims and Friends of Firefighters organization. The following year he released Jeff Beck Salute "El Becko" and Brian Tarquin Collection (1996-2008) for NuGroove Records. Brian, then, developed the guitar series "Brian Tarquin & Heavy Friends" which began with the 2014 release of Guitars for Wounded Warriors on Cleopatra Records. The album featured guest appearances by Billy Sheehan, Ron 'Bumblefoot' Thal, Reb Beach, Chris Poland, Gary Hoey, Alex De Rosso, Hal Lindes, Chuck Loeb and Steve Morse. This was benefit album raising awareness for veterans and driving donations to the Fisher House Foundation.

In 2017, horrified at the Pulse Nightclub shooting in Orlando, Tarquin composed, engineered and produced the album Orlando in Heaven featuring jazz icon Larry Coryell on two tracks along with Mike Stern, Tony Franklin, Hal Lindes, Denny Jiosa, Will Ray, Chris Poland and vocalist Phil Naro. The album charted #6 on the Jam Band charts. It benefitted the Catholic Charities of Central Florida who provided case management and support services for victims and family members of the Pulse shooting in Orlando. In 2019 Orlando in Heaven received a Global Music Gold Award for "Best Album". This same year saw Tarquin produce the rock vocal album Band of Brothers dedicated to veterans featuring Joel Hoekstra, Steve Morse, Ron 'Bumblefoot' Thal, Gary Hoey, vocalist Jeff Scott Soto, vocalist Phil Naro and cellist Tina Guo. The album charted #21 on the Metal Contraband charts. This was followed up by the 2020 release Vegas Blue which once again teamed him up with vocalist Phil Naro, dedicated to the shooting victims at the Mandalay Bay Hotel in Las Vegas October 1, 2017. Tarquin composed and produced each of these tracks featuring special guests Tony Carey ex-Rainbow keyboardist, Steve Morse, Ron 'Bumblefoot' Thal, Trey Gunn, Hal Lindes.

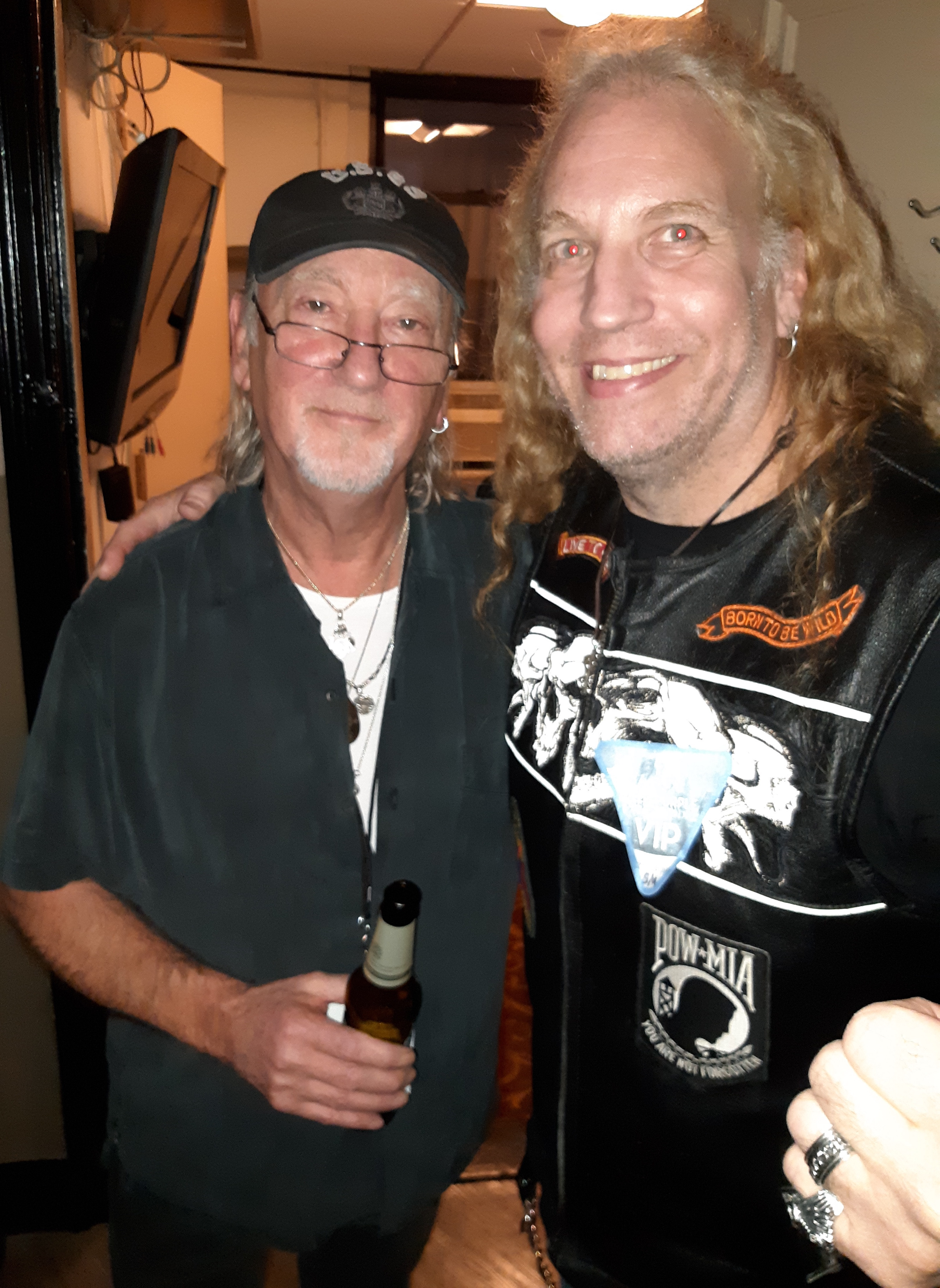
Deep Purple's Roger Glover and Brian Tarquin

In 2023 Tarquin released Brothers In Arms with guest guitarists Joe Satriani, Vinnie Moore, Alex De Rosso, Travis Stever, Jeff Duncan, Johannes Weik, Gerald Gradwohl, Chris Haskett, Ron 'Bumblefoot' Thal. The album is dedicated to those military soldiers who have fought for their country bringing awareness to the Fisher House Foundation, who supplies housing to veterans' families while they are hospitalized. It was well received by metal radio charting #7 on the NACC Loud Rock charts and #11 on the Metal Contraband charts in February 2023.

His 2024 release, Beyond The Warrior's Eyes included a collaboration of the album's title cut with electric violinist Jean Luc Ponty, which yielded an A.I. Music video that found acclaim and a nomination for a Josey Award. The Budapest Symphony Orchestra contributed to an instrumental "A Soldier's Eyes"; that featured guest guitar work from Steve Kindler. Guitarists on the album included Robben Ford, Carl Verheyen, Eric Johnson, Chris Poland, and Steve Morse who contributed to two songs including a song "These Colors Don't Run" that featured vocals from the late Phil Naro. The album helped raise funds and awareness for Washington DC's Hope For The Veterans. Brian told Music Connection Magazine of his concern about the problems veterans encounter, from homelessness to mental health concerns. The album received favorable support, hitting the top spot for over six months on the Roots Music Radio charts and number 5 on Relix Jam Band radio chart.

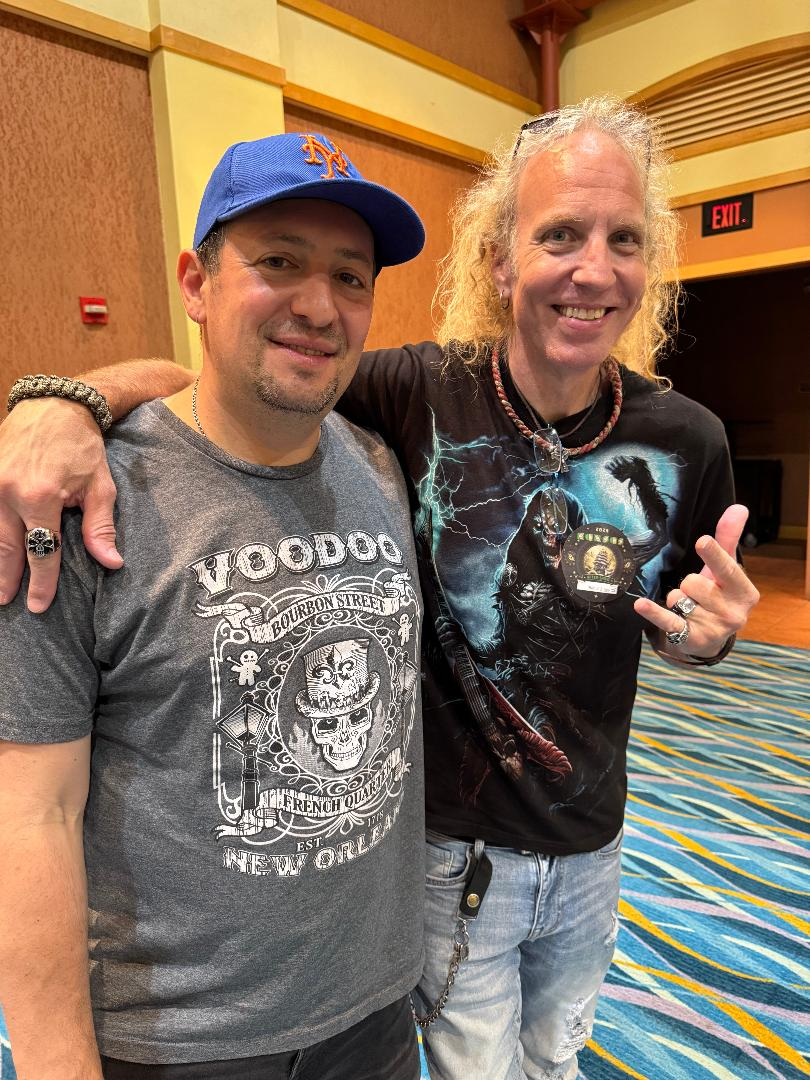
Joe Deninzon joins Steve Hackett, Gary Hoey, Joe Satriani on Brian's "Tyranny of Tone," which benefits firefighters in Southern California.

=== BHP Music-Guitar Trax Records ===
In 2006, Tarquin opened his own boutique record label called BHP Music/Guitar Trax Records, specializing in instrumental guitar music. The label releases the Guitar Master Series featuring legends: Jeff Beck, Jimmy Page, Joe Satriani, Steve Vai, Allan Holdsworth and Zakk Wylde. Initially they were distributed by Redeye distribution for physical releases, but as physical product became less popular the label exclusively went to digital distribution by IODA/The Orchard, Symphonic and Dashgo. At first Brian licensed music to release on the label from his various contacts in the music industry and directly from artists. He eventually moved on to compose, engineer and produce the releases hiring guest artists to be featured on each track. As of 2023 the label contained 94 releases including music videos. Simultaneously, Tarquin built Jungle Room Studios where he records many of the releases for his record label. Jungle Room is an extensive analog/digital studio featuring a such classic analog gear as 1986 British Trident 24 recording console, Otari MTR 90, Ampex 440c analog tape machines and various analog outboard gear. As of 2018 Jungle Room Studios is a mobile recording studio housed in a 24-foot custom made trailer. It was designed in Southern California equipped with 2 separate rooms, a live room and a control room. All of the releases for the label have been primarily recorded at Jungle Room Studios throughout the years.

Brian and his studio drummer Reggie Pryor, plus saxophonist Don Black, and bassist Brandon Miller play live throughout Florida on radio, TV, and Festivals.

== Equipment ==
During the Smooth Jazz era Tarquin primarily used a Fender pink paisley telecaster reissue with custom wound Seymour Duncan pick-ups through a Fender Blackface Twin reverb and a Carvin Belair 212 Tube Guitar Combo Amp. He then moved to using a 1978 Gibson Les Paul Goldtop Deluxe for "High Life" and Asphalt Jungle recordings through Marshall JCM 2000 through a Carvin Legacy 4x12 cabinet. However, for the Lofi recordings he used a 2011 Gibson Midtown Standard with P90's and a Sire Larry Carlton H7 through a 1969 Fender Super Reverb.

Primarily for the rock instrumental albums he used a 1997 Gibson Les Paul Custom Shop, a 2007 Gibson SG 3 pickup Limited Edition, 1983 Kramer Baretta Super Strat and a Custom Fender Strat with Seymour Duncan Blackout single coils. His amps consist of a Marshall Plexi Head with Mark Cameron Modified High Gain with a 1975 Marshall 4 x 12" cabinet with vintage Celestion 30's, a custom-made Marshall High Gain style by the Amp Shop called "The Mariner," 1984 Marshall JCM800 2x12 combo, 1979 Mesa Boogie Mark IIb 1x12 combo, a Fender Prosonic and an Orange Dark Terror with an Orange 2x12 cabinet. Tarquin uses various pedals as the Dunlop Univibe, Snarling Dogs Super Bawl Whine-O Wah, Morley Classic Wah, Dunlop Talkbox and the DigiTech Whammy Pedal. = Tarquin has been noted in using analog technology recording guitar amplifiers with microphones as Beyerdynamics M160 Ribbon, Royer R101 and a SE RT1-Ribbon Tube Microphone. Also using Rupert Neve 5043 Duo Compressor/Limiter on the guitar tracks. He also endorses Chris Yetter's Audio Scape 76A Compressor & Audio Scape 6386 EDITION V-COMP MU.

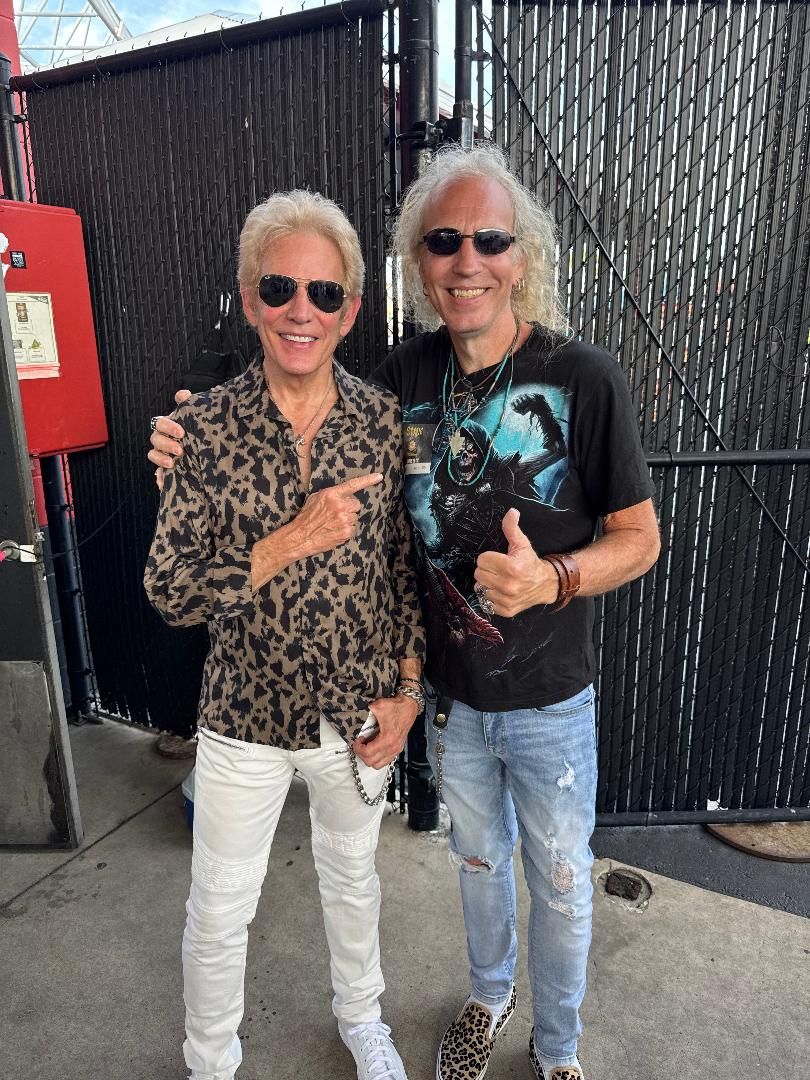
Don Felder and Brian backstage at Styx in 2025.

== Personal life ==
Tarquin was married in Edinburgh, Scotland in 2000 to Melissa Demafeliz; the marriage ended in 2022 due to divorce. He has 3 children: Liam Tarquin, Brianna Katherine and Bridget Bette. Tarquin is a devoted Roman Catholic and has donated to various Catholic causes. He is an avid classic movie collector and motorcycle enthusiast. Upon graduation of high school, he won honor awards for Ceramics and English. Tarquin has made several of his own guitars and used them on recordings through the years. He was close to his maternal grandmother Katherine Pema, an immigrant from Albania. Katherine helped raise him and lived with the family on and off for the first 18 years of his life. He has resided in Studio City, CA., New York and Cape Canaveral, FL.

== Publications and radio ==
=== Books ===
- Recording Techniques of the Guitar Masters
- The Insider's Guide to Music Licensing
- The Insider's Guide to Home Recording
- Guitar Amplifier Encyclopedia
- Guitar Encyclopedia
- Stomp on This! The Guitar Pedal Effects Guidebook
- Survival Guide For Music Composers: Tools of the Trade to Get Paid!

=== Magazine columns ===
In 2017-2018 Tarquin wrote a series of recording studio articles for Guitar Player magazine. In 2010 he was a regular contributor to Recording Magazine, and in 2007 he wrote a monthly column called "Guitar Studio" for Premier Guitar Magazine. The column focused on studio techniques for musicians and recording engineers. Tarquin also conducted interviews of musicians for the magazine. He currently writes guitar articles for Southern Florida's Music Magazine, Lazie Indie Magazine, and Music Connection Magazine.

=== Radio show ===
Tarquin hosts a weekly show called Guitar Trax on NPR's WFIT 89.5FM (Florida). The show debuted on January 11, 2016 and focuses on jazz and electric fusion styles such as Weather Report, Pat Metheny, Mahavishnu Orchestra, Billy Cobham, Jeff Beck and Frank Zappa.

== Discography ==
List of studio albums
| Ghost Dance | 1996 |
| Best of Acid Jazz, Vol. 2 | 1997 (compilation) |
| Last Kiss Goodbye | 1997 |
| Welcome to the Jazz Café | 1998 (compilation) |
| Smooth Moods | 1998 (compilation) |
| Soft Touch | 1999 |
| Sweet Emotions: Smooth Jazz Romance | 1999 (compilation) |
| Bossa Brava: Caliente | 1999 (compilation) |
| The Best of Smooth Jazz Blues | 1999 (compilation) |
| This is Smooth Jazz | 1999 (compilation) |
| Smooth Jazz Radio Hits, Vol.1 | 1999 (compilation) |
| Smooth Jazz Radio Hits, Vol.2 | 2000 (compilation) |
| Pacific Coast Highway | 2000 (compilation) |
| This is Smooth Jazz: Love Bossa Style | 2000 (compilation) |
| High Life | 2001 |
| This is Smooth Jazz: The Box Set | 2001 (compilation) |
| Electro Ave. | 2002 (with Asphalt Jungle) |
| Sanctuary | 2002 (compilation) |
| Smooth Operators: Great Smooth Jazz Moments | 2002 (compilation) |
| Enjoy This Trip | 2005 (with Asphalt Jungle) |
| Junglization | 2006 (with Asphalt Jungle) |
| Bob Marley Remixed | 2007 (with Asphalt Jungle) |
| Guitar Masters, Vol. 1 | 2008 (compilation) |
| Led Zeppelin Salute "Get the Led Out!" | 2008 (compilation) |
| Jeff Beck Salute "El Becko" | 2008 (compilation) |
| Fretworx | 2008 |
| Brian Tarquin Collection (1996-2008) | 2009 |
| Jimi Hendrix Tribute "Third Stone From The Sun" | 2009 (compilation) |
| Stevie Ray Vaughan Tribute "Lenny" | 2009 (compilation) |
| Eric Clapton Salute "I Feel Free" | 2009 (compilation) |
| Guitar Masters, Vol. 2 | 2009 (compilation) |
| Guitar Masters, Vol. 3 & 4: Les Paul Dedication | 2010 (compilation) |
| Brian Tarquin Collection II | 2010 |
| Guitars for Wounded Warriors | 2014 |
| Smooth Jazz Cafe | 2014 |
| Exiled in Paradise | 2015 |
| Orlando in Heaven | 2017 |
| Band of Brothers | 2017 |
| Classic Radio Hits | 2017 |
| Guitars For Veterans | 2018 |
| Rewind | 2018 |
| Crazy Train | 2018 (with Asphalt Jungle) |
| Guitar Masters Collection | 2018 (compilation) |
| Deck The Halls | 2018 |
| Soundtracks I | 2019 |
| Soundtracks II | 2019 |
| Vegas Blue | 2020 |
| LoFi Smooth Jazz Bistro | 2022 |
| Lofi Jazzhop Avenue | 2022 |
| Lofi-Licious | 2023 (with Asphalt Jungle) |
| Jazz-Fi | 2023 (with Asphalt Jungle) |
| Brothers In Arms | 2023 |
| Beyond The Warrior's Eyes | 2024 |

== Awards and nominations ==
Wins

- 2002 National Academy of Television Arts & Sciences Emmy Award for Outstanding Achievement in Music Direction and Composition for a Drama Series for All My Children
- 2003 National Academy of Television Arts & Sciences Emmy Award Winner for Outstanding Achievement in Music Direction and Composition for a Drama Series for All My Children (shared with Terry Walker, Andrew J. Gundell, Jerry Pilato, Dominic Messinger, Mike Renzi, John Wineglass, Brian Comotto, Loris Holland, Robbie Kondor, Ron Goodman, Gary Kuo, Kim Oler, Peter Fish, and Jim Klein)
- 2005 National Academy of Television Arts & Sciences Emmy Award Winner for Outstanding Achievement in Music Direction and Composition for a Drama Series for All My Children (shared with Terry Walker, Jerry Pilato, A.J. Gundell, Dominic Messinger, R. C. Cates, John Wineglass, Brian Comotto, Loris Holland, Gary Kuo, Kim Oler, Peter Fish, Tom Spahn, and Jim Klein)
- 2006 SESAC Network Television Performance Award All My Children
- 2014 USA Best Book Awards Performing Arts Winner for Guitar Encyclopedia'*2018 USA Best Book Awards Performing Arts Winner for Survival Guide for Music Composers: Tools of the Trade to Get Paid!
- 2018 American Book Fest – Best Book (Performing Arts) Survival Guide for Music Composers (Hal Leonard)
- 2019 Global Music Awards Gold for Best album Orlando in Heaven
- 2023 Hollywood Independent Music Awards – Independent Record Label: BHP Music Guitar Trax Records
- 2023 Josie Music Awards – Music Video of the Year: Speed of Sound and Joe Satriani & Brian Tarquin, Director: 3Dave

2024 Josie Music Awards – Instrumental Album,"Beyond The Warrior's Eyes" Nominations

- 2002-2007 National Academy of Television Arts & Sciences Emmy Award Nomination for Outstanding Achievement in Music Direction and Composition for a Drama Series for All My Children (shared with Terry Walker, A.J. Gundell, Jerry Pilato, John Wineglass, Brian Comotto, Loris Holland, Gary Kuo, Kim Oler, Peter Fish, Tom Spahn, and Jim Klein)
- 2009 National Academy of Television Arts & Sciences Emmy Award Nomination for Outstanding Achievement in Music Direction and Composition for a Drama Series for All My Children
- 2014 American Book Fest – Best Book (Performing Arts)Insiders Guide to Music Licensing (Allsworth Press)
- 2015 American Book Fest – Best Book (Performing Arts) Insiders Guide to Music Recording (Allsworth Press)
- 2015 American Book Fest – Best Book (Performing Arts) Stomp on This: The Guitar Pedal Effects Guidebook (Cengage)
- 2016 Independent Music Awards Nomination for Best Album – Compilation for Guitars for Wounded Warriors as Brian Tarquin & Heavy Friends
- 2017 Independent Music Awards Nomination for Best Album – Compilation for Orlando in Heaven as Brian Tarquin & Company
- 2017 American Book Fest Best Book (Performing Arts) Guitar Amplifier Encyclopedia(Skyhorse Publishing)
- 2018 Independent Music Awards Nomination for Best Album – Compilation for Guitars for Veterans as Brian Tarquin & Heavy Friends Deux
- 2022 Josie Music Awards nominations for Best Guitarist & Best Producer
- 2023 Josie Music Awards – Instrumental Album, Musician, Music Producer of the Year "Brothers In Arms"
- 2024 Josie Music Awards – Instrumental Album,"Beyond The Warrior's Eyes," Music Video of the Year "Beyond the Warrior's Eyes," Musician of the Year (Guitarist), Music Producer of the Year, Record Label of the Year- BHP Music-Guitar Trax Music.

== Charts ==
| Chart | Ranking |
|---|---|
| Radio & Records NAC/Smooth Jazz March 6, 1998 single – "One Arabian Knight" | (#4) |
| Gavin Smooth Jazz & Vocals November 26, 1999 single – "Darlin' Darlin' Baby" | (#9) |
| Radio & Records NAC/Smooth Jazz 1998 Year-End Chart | (#23) |
| Radio & Records NAC/Smooth Jazz 1999 Year-End Chart | (#40) |
| Relix Jam Band charts – Orlando In Heaven | (#6) |
| Metal Contraband charts – Band of Brothers | (#21) |
| Billboard charts – This is Acid Jazz, Vol. 2 | (#23) |
| NACC Loud Rock Radio – Brothers In Arms | (#7) |
| Metal Contraband Radio – Brothers In Arms | (#11) |
| Roots Music Radio – Beyond The Warrior's Eyes | (#1) |
| Relix / Jamband Radio Charts – Beyond The Warrior's Eyes | (#5) |
