= Animal instinct =

Instinct is the inherent disposition of a living organism toward a particular behavior.

Animal instinct(s) may also refer to:

== Music ==
- Animal Instinct (Tygers of Pan Tang album), 2008
- Animal Instinct (Gary Hoey album), 1993
- "Animal Instinct" (Annemarie Eilfeld song), 2010
- "Animal Instinct" (Cranberries song), 1999
- "Animal Instinct", a song by Mobb Deep from the album Hell on Earth
- "Animal Instincts", a song by Kajagoogoo, from the album White Feathers

== Film and television ==
- Animal Instincts (film), a 1992 thriller-drama film
- "Animal Instincts" (The Green Green Grass), an episode of the BBC sitcom The Green Green Grass
