= Vegas Blue =

Studio album by Brian Tarquin
- Released: March 2020
- Recorded: May–December 2019
- Studio: Jungle Room Studios
- Genre: Progressive rock, heavy metal, instrumental guitar
- Length: 38:54
- Label: BHP Music-Guitar Trax Records
- Producer: Brian Tarquin

Brian Tarquin chronology
Band of Brothers (2017)	Vegas Blue (2020)

Singles from Vegas Blue
- 1. "Distant Light, Tomorrow's Another Day"

Vegas Blue is the tenth solo studio album by guitarist Brian Tarquin, released on July 7, 2017, by BHP Music-Guitar Trax Records. All tracks were recorded at Tarquin's Jungle Room Studios in Merritt Island, Florida and second predominantly vocal album recorded by Brian with Phil Naro from Billy Sheehan’s band Talas. Tarquin composed and produced the songs especially for the shooting tragedy in Las Vegas, Nevada, at the Mandalay Bay Hotel on October 1st, 2017. It features guest appearances by Steve Morse (Deep Purple), Ron 'Bumblefoot' Thal (ex-Guns N' Roses), Trey Gunn (King Crimson), Tony Carey (Rainbow), Hal Lindes (Dire Straits), Brian states, “This release is dedicated to the victims of the tragic events that occurred at the Mandalay Bay Hotel. All our hearts and prayers go out to them and their families. Through this music we have tried to creatively express our deepest feelings.”

== Track listing ==
No.	Title	Music	Guest musician	Length
1.	"Distant Light"	Brian Tarquin	Steve Morse, Hal Lindes	4:29
2.	"Lights of Las Vegas"	Brian Tarquin, Phil Naro	Ron "Bumblefoot" Thal	3:44
3.	"Demonic"	Brian Tarquin	Trey Gunn	3:56
4.	"Tomorrow's Another Day"	Brian Tarquin, Phil Naro	Phil Naro	4:29
5.	"Vegas Blue"	Brian Tarquin		5:06
6.	"Evil In Men's Hearts"	Brian Tarquin	Tony Carey	4:14
7.	"Forgiveness"	Brian Tarquin, Phil Naro	Phil Naro	4:12
8.	"Know Me"	Brian Tarquin, Phil Naro	Phil Naro	3:24
9.	"Hallowed Ground"	Brian Tarquin	Trey Gunn	4:18
10.	"Run For Cover"	Brian Tarquin	The Flyin’ Ryan Brothers	5:47
11.	"Distant Light (Vocal Reprise)"	Brian Tarquin	Steve Morse, Hal Lindes, Phil Naro	4:29

== Personnel ==
- Brian Tarquin – all rhythm, melody & solo guitars & bass on (track 1)
- Reggie Pryor – drums (tracks 1–6, 9, 11)
- Rick Mullen – bass (tracks 2)
- Randy Coven – bass (tracks 10)
- Trey Gunn – guest bass (3, 9)
- Ron "Bumblefoot" Thal – guest guitar solo (track 2)
- Hal Lindes – guest guitar solo (track 1, 11)
- Don Black – sax (track 6)
- Phil Naro – vocals (tracks 2, 4, 7, 8, 10, 11)
- Greg Morrow – drums (tracks 7, 8, 10)
- Steve Morse – guest guitar solo (tracks 1, 11)
- Brandon Miller – bass (tracks 5, 6)
- Chris Ingram – bass, keyboards (tracks 4, 7, 8)
- Brian Tarquin – mix engineer, producer
- Additional vocal recording by Frank Tassone
- David Glasser of Airshow & Geoff Gray – mastering engineers
- Brian Tarquin – graphic design
