= Umleitung =

Umleitung may refer to:

- "Umleitung", a song by Status Quo from the album Dog of Two Head, 1971
- "Umleitung", a song by Cluster from the album Sowiesoso, 1976
- Umleitung, a musical group formed by Dominik Büchele
- Umleitung, the German title of the 1945 film Detour
