= Deutschland sucht den Superstar season 6 =

Season of television series

Deutschland sucht den Superstar
- Season 6
- Hosted by: Marco Schreyl
- Judges: Dieter Bohlen; Nina Eichinger; Volker Neumüller; Max van Thun (First Audition only)
- Winner: Daniel Schuhmacher
- Runner-up: Sarah Kreuz

Release
- Original network: RTL
- Original release: 21 January – 9 May 2009

Season chronology
- ← Previous; Season 5 Next → Season 7

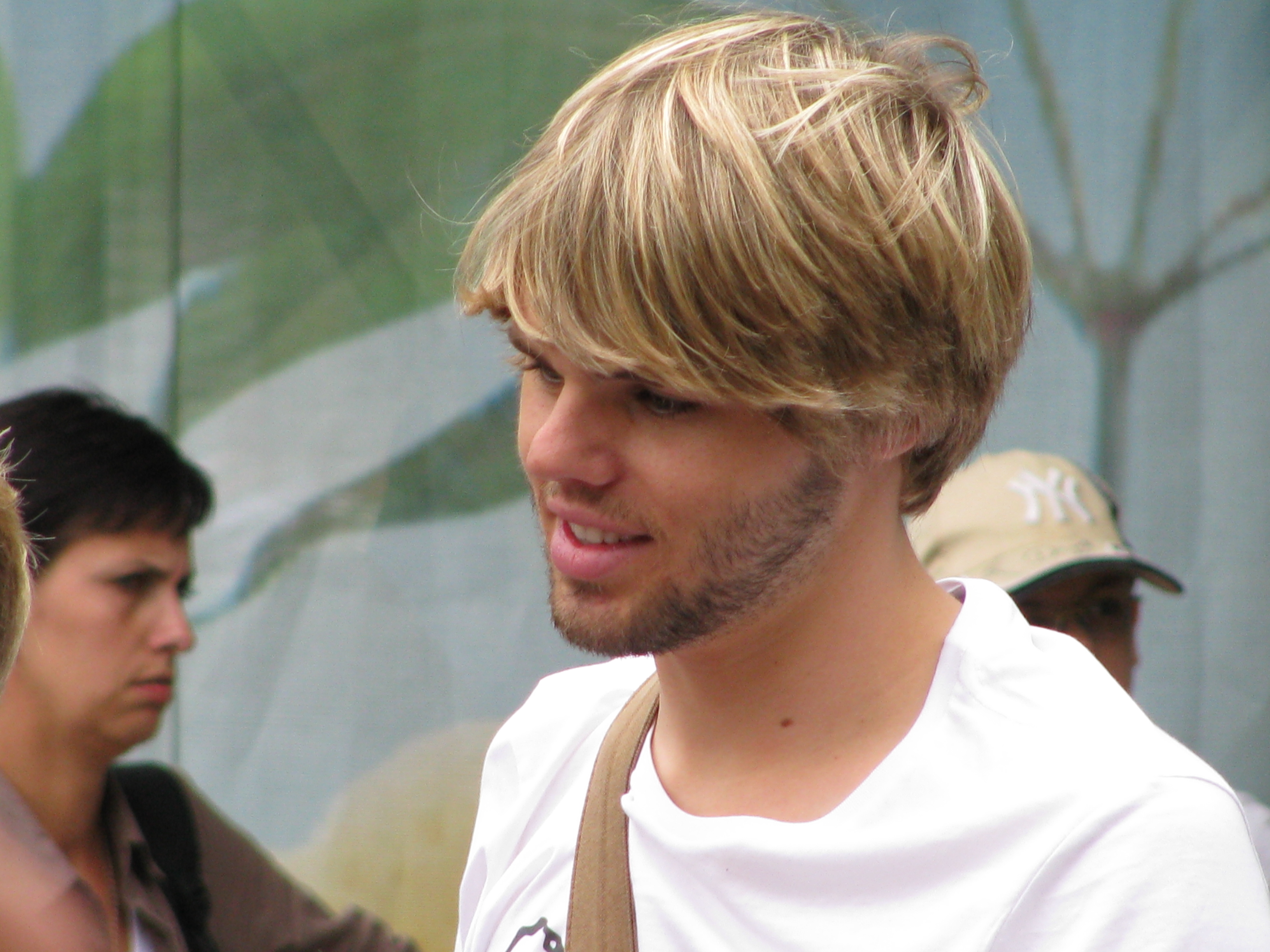
DSDS season six winner Daniel Schuhmacher

The sixth season of Deutschland sucht den Superstar was aired on German channel RTL from January to May 2009. The season's winner, Daniel Schuhmacher, was awarded a contract with Sony BMG. The judges in this season were Dieter Bohlen, Nina Eichinger, and Volker Neumüller. It was hosted by Marco Schreyl. The viewers chose the contestant's fates as they were able to call for their favorite contestant. As with season 5, the "Top 10" was created by the Top 5 contestants with the most telephone and SMS voting and the other five were selected by the jury.

== Finalists ==
(Ages stated at time of contest)

Contestant	Age	Hometown	Voted off	Liveshow theme
Daniel Schuhmacher	21	Pfullendorf	Winner	Grand Finale
Sarah Kreuz	19	Poppenhausen	9 May 2009	Grand Finale
Annemarie Eilfeld	18	Dessau	2 May 2009	Uptempo Songs, Ballad Songs & No. 1 Hits
Dominik Büchele	18	Kappel-Grafenhausen	25 April 2009	Film Hits & Unplugged
Benny Kieckhäben	18	Worms	18 April 2009	Sun and Rain
Vanessa Neigert	17	Nuremberg	11 April 2009	Current Hits & Love Songs
Holger Göpfert	27	Würzburg	4 April 2009	Sexy Hits
Marc Jentzen	21	Bonn	21 March 2009	Party Hits
Cornelia Patzelsberger	29	Munich	14 March 2009	Gender Switch
Michelle Bowers	16	Viereth-Trunstadt	7 March 2009	Greatest Hits
Vanessa Civiello	16	Leinfelden-Echterdingen	Withdrew	

== Voting controversy ==
Annemarie Eilfeld demanded a redo after she was eliminated in the Top 3 show. RTL admitted that a speaker in the "reminder" trailers following the show had told viewers to vote 03 for Eilfeld and 02 for Daniel Schuhmacher. She called this problem a "scandal". The mistake was not considered big enough for RTL to bother with. After the initial show, Eilfeld had 19.3% of the vote and ended up with 19.8% with the second place contestant receiving a much higher total. Angry DSDS fans complained and demanded either a repeat of the Top 3 show or a three-way final between Eilfeld, Schuhmacher and Sarah Kreuz. Eilfeld's father was outraged over the error and reportedly considering taking legal action against RTL.

== Top 15 – "Jetzt oder nie" (Top 15 - Now or Never) ==
Original airdate: 28 February 2009

Contestant	Song (Artist)	Percentage of calls
Marc Jentzen	Breathe Easy (Blue)	4.36% (8/15)
Roshan Paul	Dance with Somebody (Mando Diao)	2.04% (12/15)
Michelle Bowers	Almost Lover (A Fine Frenzy)	1.16% (15/15)
Annemarie Eilfeld	Hot n Cold (Katy Perry)	4.57% (6/15)
Florian Ehlers	Home (Michael Bublé)	4.12% (9/15)
Vanessa Neigert	Schöner fremder Mann (Connie Francis)	6.05% (5/15)
Cornelia Patzlsperger	Time After Time (Cyndi Lauper)	1.38% (13/15)
Tobias Rößler	Here Without You (3 Doors Down)	4.44% (7/15)
Vanessa Civiello	Greatest Love of All (Whitney Houston)	3.09% (11/15)
Benny Kieckhäben	Hurt (Christina Aguilera)	3.79% (10/15)
Daniel Schuhmacher	Broken Strings (James Morrison)	10.63% (4/15)
Fausta Giordano	Umbrella (Rihanna)	1.33% (14/15)
Sarah Kreuz	Listen (Beyoncé Knowles)	12.99% (3/15)
Dominik Büchele	Same Mistake (James Blunt)	22.22% (1/15)
Holger Göpfert	Oh! Darling (The Beatles)	17.83% (2/15)

Advancing to Top 10 (Public votes): Vanessa N, Daniel, Sarah, Dominik, Holger

Advancing to Top 10 (Jury selection): Marc, Annemarie, Cornelia, Vanessa C, Benny

Although Florian and Tobias were eliminated, they both ranked within the top 10 in the phone voting with Florian placing 9th and Tobias placing 7th, ahead of Marc, Benny, Vanessa C., and Cornelia.

== Finals ==
=== Top 10 - "Greatest Hits" ===
Original airdate: 7 March 2009

Contestant	Song (Artist)	Percentage of calls
Annemarie Eilfeld	...Baby One More Time (Britney Spears)	4.49% (9/10)
Benny Kieckhäben	So Sick (Ne-Yo)	5.67% (8/10)
Cornelia Patzlsberger	Mercy (Duffy)	11.52% (5/10)
Daniel Schuhmacher	If You Don't Know Me by Now (Simply Red)	13.97%(3/10)
Dominik Büchele	Imagine (John Lennon)	17.28% (1/10)
Holger Göpfert	The Great Pretender (Freddie Mercury)	12.61%(4/10)
Marc Jentzen	End of the Road (Boyz II Men)	7.03% (7/10)
Sarah Kreuz	I Have Nothing (Whitney Houston)	16.61% (2/10)
Michelle Bowers	Valerie (Amy Winehouse)	3.69% (10/10)
Vanessa Neigert	Er gehört zu mir (Marianne Rosenberg)	7.13% (6/10)

Bottom 4: Marc Jentzen, Benny Kieckhäben, Michelle Bowers, Annemarie Eilfeld

Jury Elimination Forecast: Benny Kieckhäben

Eliminated: Michelle Bowers

=== Top 9 - "Geschlechtertausch" (Gender Switch) ===
Original airdate: 14 March 2009

Contestant	Song (Artist)	Percentage of calls
Sarah Kreuz	You Raise Me Up (Westlife)	12.45% (4/9)
Annemarie Eilfeld	All Summer Long (Kid Rock)	6.63% (7/9)
Cornelia Patzlsperger	Your Song (Elton John)	4.60% (9/9)
Vanessa Neigert	Über den Wolken (Reinhard Mey)	11.40% (5/9)
Holger Göpfert	Black Velvet (Alannah Myles)	15.39% (2/9)
Benny Kieckhäben	Like a Virgin (Madonna)	6.55% (8/9)
Marc Jentzen	I Kissed a Girl (Katy Perry)	7.40% (6/9)
Daniel Schuhmacher	Irgendwas bleibt (Silbermond)	13.11% (3/9)
Dominik Büchele	First Day of My Life (Melanie C)	22.47% (1/9)

Bottom 4: Marc Jentzen, Cornelia Patzlsperger, Benny Kieckhäben, Annemarie Eilfeld

Jury Elimination Forecast: Benny Kieckhäben

Eliminated: Cornelia Patzlsperger

=== Top 8 - "Party Hits" ===
Original airdate: 21 March 2009

Contestant	Song (Artist)	Percentage of calls
Dominik Büchele	Reality (Richard Sanderson)	18.11% (2/8)
Benny Kieckhäben	What Is Love (Haddaway)	9.37% (7/8)
Sarah Kreuz	I Will Survive (Gloria Gaynor)	11.74% (5/8)
Marc Jentzen	Celebration (Kool & the Gang)	7.62% (8/8)
Daniel Schuhmacher	Sweet Dreams (Are Made of This) (Eurythmics)	18.39% (1/8)
Vanessa Neigert	Ich will 'nen Cowboy als Mann (Gitte)	10.03% (6/8)
Holger Göpfert	We Are the Champions (Queen)	12.62% (3/8)
Annemarie Eilfeld	99 Luftballons (Nena)	12.12% (4/8)

Bottom 4: Benny Kieckhäben, Marc Jentzen, Vanessa Neigert, Annemarie Eilfeld

Jury Elimination Forecast: Annemarie Eilfeld

Eliminated: Marc Jentzen

=== Top 7 - "Sexy Hits" ===
Original airdate: 4 April 2009

Contestant	Song (Artist)	Percentage of calls
Daniel Schuhmacher	Sexual Healing (Marvin Gaye)	21.29% (1/7)
Holger Göpfert	Still Got The Blues (Gary Moore)	8.14% (7/7)
Annemarie Eilfeld	Lady Marmalade (Christina Aguilera)	15.72% (4/7)
Benny Kieckhäben	Don't Cha (The Pussycat Dolls)	8.85% (6/7)
Vanessa Neigert	Yes Sir, I Can Boogie (Baccara)	9.75% (5/7)
Sarah Kreuz	The Trouble with Love Is (Kelly Clarkson)	19.04% (2/7)
Dominik Büchele	Sunday Morning (Maroon 5)	17.21% (3/7)

Bottom 4: Benny Kieckhäben, Holger Göpfert, Vanessa Neigert, Annemarie Eilfeld

Jury Elimination Forecast: Dominik Büchele (Nina), Annemarie Eilfeld (Volker & Dieter)

Eliminated: Holger Göpfert

=== Top 6 - "Aktuelle Hits & I Love You" (Current Hits & I Love You) ===
Original airdate: 11 April 2009

Contestant	Song (Artist)	Percentage of calls
Dominik Büchele	Stark (Ich + Ich)	18.92% (3/6)
Dominik Büchele	Wire to Wire (Razorlight)	18.92% (3/6)
Vanessa Neigert	Liebeskummer Lohnt Sich Nicht (Siw Malmkvist)	12.98% (6/6)
Vanessa Neigert	Gib Mir Sonne (Rosenstolz)	12.98% (6/6)
Annemarie Eilfeld	Just Dance (Lady Gaga)	19.38% (2/6)
Annemarie Eilfeld	Nobody Knows (Pink)	19.38% (2/6)
Sarah Kreuz	Unforgettable (Nat King Cole)	19.68% (1/6)
Sarah Kreuz	If I Were a Boy (Beyoncé Knowles)	19.68% (1/6)
Benny Kieckhäben	Closer (Ne-Yo)	13.16% (5/6)
Benny Kieckhäben	Und wenn ein Lied (Söhne Mannheims)	13.16% (5/6)
Daniel Schumacher	You Give Me Something (James Morrison)	15.88% (4/6)
Daniel Schumacher	Allein Allein (Polarkreis 18)	15.88% (4/6)

Bottom 4: Annemarie Eilfeld, Benny Kieckhäben, Daniel Schuhmacher, Vanessa Neigert

Jury Elimination Forecast: Benny Kieckhäben (Volker), Benny Kieckhäben or Vanessa Neigert (Nina), Didn't say (Dieter)

Eliminated: Vanessa Neigert

=== Top 5 - "Sonne und Regen" (Sun and Rain) ===
Original airdate: 18 April 2009

Contestant	Song (Artist)	Percentage of calls
Dominik Büchele	Upside Down (Jack Johnson)	16.69% (3/5)
Dominik Büchele	Why Does It Always Rain on Me? (Travis)	16.69% (3/5)
Sarah Kreuz	You Are the Sunshine of My Life (Stevie Wonder)	15.04% (4/5)
Sarah Kreuz	It's Raining Men (The Weather Girls)	15.04% (4/5)
Benny Kieckhäben	Walking on Sunshine (Katrina and the Waves)	13.27% (5/5)
Benny Kieckhäben	When the Rain Begins to Fall (Pia Zadora & Jermaine Jackson)	13.27% (5/5)
Daniel Schuhmacher	Here Comes the Rain Again (Eurythmics)	32.68% (1/5)
Daniel Schuhmacher	Ain't No Sunshine (Bill Withers)	32.68% (1/5)
Annemarie Eilfeld	Purple Rain (Prince)	22.32% (2/5)
Annemarie Eilfeld	Bailando (Loona)	22.32% (2/5)
Oliver Pocher	Durch den Monsun (Tokio Hotel)	0.00% (0/5)

Bottom 3: Annemarie Eilfeld, Benny Kieckhäben, Sarah Kreuz

Jury Elimination Forecast: Annemarie Eilfeld (Nina), Dominik Büchele (Volker), Benny Kieckhäben (Dieter)

Eliminated: Benny Kieckhäben

=== Top 4 - "Filmmusik & Unplugged" (Movie songs & Unplugged) ===
Original airdate: 25 April 2009

Contestant	Song (Artist)	Percentage of calls
Dominik Büchele	Can You Feel the Love Tonight (Elton John)	18.39% (4/4)
Dominik Büchele	The Sounds of Silence (Simon & Garfunkel)	18.39% (4/4)
Sarah Kreuz	I Will Always Love You (Whitney Houston)	31.94% (1/4)
Sarah Kreuz	Warwick Avenue (Duffy)	31.94% (1/4)
Daniel Schuhmacher	Take My Breath Away (Berlin)	26.59% (2/4)
Daniel Schuhmacher	You Are So Beautiful (Joe Cocker)	26.59% (2/4)
Annemarie Eilfeld	There You'll Be (Faith Hill)	23.08% (3/4)
Annemarie Eilfeld	Because of You (Kelly Clarkson)	23.08% (3/4)

Bottom 3: Annemarie Eilfeld, Dominik Büchele, Sarah Kreuz

Jury Elimination Forecast: Dominik Büchele (Nina & Volker), Sarah Kreuz (Dieter)

Eliminated: Dominik Büchele

=== Top 3 - "Uptempo, Ballade & Nr. 1 Hit" (Uptempo, Power ballad & No. 1 Hits) ===
Original airdate: 2 May 2009

Contestant	Song (Artist)	Percentage of calls
Annemarie Eilfeld	Maneater (Nelly Furtado)	19.98% (3/3)
Annemarie Eilfeld	The Voice Within (Christina Aguilera)	19.98% (3/3)
Annemarie Eilfeld	My Life Would Suck Without You (Kelly Clarkson)	19.98% (3/3)
Daniel Schuhmacher	Rehab (Amy Winehouse)	33.81% (2/3)
Daniel Schuhmacher	Get Here (Oleta Adams)	33.81% (2/3)
Daniel Schuhmacher	Stand by Me (Ben E. King)	33.81% (2/3)
Sarah Kreuz	I'm Outta Love (Anastacia)	46.21% (1/3)
Sarah Kreuz	One Moment in Time (Whitney Houston)	46.21% (1/3)
Sarah Kreuz	Für dich (Yvonne Catterfeld)	46.21% (1/3)

Bottom 2: Annemarie Eilfeld, Sarah Kreuz

Jury Elimination Forecast: Didn't say

Eliminated: Annemarie Eilfeld

=== Top 2 - Finale - "Herzenssong", "Staffelhighlight", "Siegertitel" (Singer's choice, Highlight Song, Winner's Single) ===
Original airdate: 9 May 2009

Contestant	Song (Artist)	Percentage of calls
Daniel Schuhmacher	Soulmate (Natasha Bedingfield)	50,47% (1/2)
Daniel Schuhmacher	Ain't No Sunshine (Bill Withers)	50,47% (1/2)
Daniel Schuhmacher	Anything but Love (winner's song)	50,47% (1/2)
Sarah Kreuz	Natural Woman (Aretha Franklin)	49,53% (2/2)
Sarah Kreuz	I Will Always Love You (Whitney Houston)	49,53% (2/2)
Sarah Kreuz	Anything but Love (winner's song)	49,53% (2/2)

Judges' forecasts of who would win: Daniel or Sarah (Nina, Volker & Dieter)

Winner: Daniel Schuhmacher

Runner - Up: Sarah Kreuz

== Top 10 contestants ==
=== Michelle Bowers ===
Michelle Bowers (born 6 August 1992 in Frankfurt am Main) was the youngest participant in the Top 10. She was originally eliminated in the "Top 15" show when both the viewers and jury did not put her into the next round. However one day before the first theme show, contestant Vanessa Civiello quit the competition bringing Bowers back into the Top 10. Although with only one night of rehearsal, the judges praised her comeback and believed it would allow her to go further in the competition. However, she was eliminated.

Theme (date)	Song	Original artist	Place/Percentage
The Top 15 - Now or Never (28 February 2009)	Almost Lover	A Fine Frenzy	1.16% (15/15)
Top 10 - Greatest Hits (7 March 2009)	Valerie	Amy Winehouse	3.69% (10/10)

=== Dominik Büchele ===
Dominik Büchele (born 23 February 1991 in Herbolzheim) has been voted off the competition after theme show 7, finishing in the Top 4. He was known for his comparison and looks of James Blunt. He was a fan favorite among the girls.

- Audition: "Same Mistake" - James Blunt
- Recall 1: "I'm Yours" - Jason Mraz
- Recall 2: "You Give Me Something" - James Morrison
- Recall 3: "Goodbye My Lover" - James Blunt

Theme (date)	Song	Original artist	Place/Percentage
The Top 15 - Now or Never (28 February 2009)	Same Mistake	James Blunt	22.22% (1/15)
Top 10 - Greatest Hits (7 March 2009)	Imagine	John Lennon	17.28% (1/10)
Top 9 - Geschlechtertausch (14 March 2009)	First Day of My Life	Melanie C	22.47% (1/9)
Top 8 - Party Hits (21 March 2009)	Reality	Richard Sanderson	18.11% (2/8)
Top 7 - Sexy Hits (4 April 2009)	Sunday Morning	Maroon 5	17.21% (3/7)
Top 6 - Aktuelle Hits & I Love You (11 April 2009)	Stark	Ich + Ich	18.92% (3/6)
Top 6 - Aktuelle Hits & I Love You (11 April 2009)	Wire to Wire	Razorlight	18.92% (3/6)
Top 5 - Sonne und Regen (18 April 2009)	Upsite Down	Jack Johnson	16.69% (3/5)
Top 5 - Sonne und Regen (18 April 2009)	Why Does It Always Rain on Me?	Travis	16.69% (3/5)
Top 4 - Movie songs & Unplugged (25 April 2009)	Can You Feel the Love Tonight	Elton John	18.39% (4/4)
Top 4 - Movie songs & Unplugged (25 April 2009)	The Sounds of Silence	Simon & Garfunkel	18.39% (4/4)

=== Vanessa Civiello ===
Vanessa Civiello (born 7 May 1991 in Stuttgart) was a jury selection for Top 10 after participating in the Top 15 liveshow. One day before the first theme show, Civiello voluntarily withdrew. Michelle Bowers was recalled to replace Civiello.

Theme (date)	Song	Original artist	Place/Percentage
The Top 15 - Now or Never (28 February 2009)	Greatest Love of All	Whitney Houston	3.09% (11/15)
(Didn't sing) Top 10 - Greatest Hits (7 March 2009)	There You'll Be	Faith Hill	-

=== Annemarie Eilfeld ===
Theme (date)	Song	Original artist	Place/Percentage
The Top 15 - Now or Never (28 February 2009)	Hot n Cold	Katy Perry	4.57% (6/15)
Top 10 - Greatest Hits (7 March 2009)	...Baby One More Time	Britney Spears	4.49% (9/10)
Top 9 - Geschlechtertausch (14 March 2009)	All Summer Long	Kid Rock	6.63% (7/9)
Top 8 - Party Hits (21 March 2009)	99 Luftballons	Nena	12.12% (4/8)
Top 7 - Sexy Hits (4 April 2009)	Lady Marmalade	Christina Aguilera	15.72% (4/7)
Top 6 - Aktuelle Hits & I Love You (11 April 2009)	Just Dance	Lady Gaga	19.38% (2/6)
Top 6 - Aktuelle Hits & I Love You (11 April 2009)	Nobody Knows	Pink	19.38% (2/6)
Top 5 - Sonne und Regen (18 April 2009)	Purple Rain	Prince	22.32% (2/5)
Top 5 - Sonne und Regen (18 April 2009)	Bailando	Loona	22.32% (2/5)
Top 4 - Movie songs & Unplugged (25 April 2009)	There You'll Be	Faith Hill	23.08% (3/4)
Top 4 - Movie songs & Unplugged (25 April 2009)	Because of You	Kelly Clarkson	23.08% (3/4)
Top 3 - Uptempo, Power ballad & No. 1 Hits (2 May 2009)	Maneater	Nelly Furtado	19.98% (3/3)
Top 3 - Uptempo, Power ballad & No. 1 Hits (2 May 2009)	The Voice Within	Christina Aguilera	19.98% (3/3)
Top 3 - Uptempo, Power ballad & No. 1 Hits (2 May 2009)	My Life Would Suck Without You	Kelly Clarkson	19.98% (3/3)

=== Holger Göpfert ===
Holger Göpfert (born 13 May 1981 in Würzburg) worked as an administration employee in Würzburg and is a soccer player. He auditioned in season 3 but did not make it through to the recall. At 13, Holger began to teach himself keyboard and to sing pass after songs. He also taught himself to play piano and guitar. He is a huge fan of the Beatles, Queen and Elvis in which he had sung songs in the show by these artists. His favorite song is "Oh Darling!" by the Beatles, in which he sang on the "Top 15" show and was selected further by call in votes. He was a fan favorite due to his excellent performing and entertainment rather than his voice. Although considered a joke contestant, he was well known for being a favorite and possible winner of the competition until his elimination.

- Audition: "Oh Darling" - The Beatles
- Recall 1: "The Great Pretender" - Freddie Mercury
- Recall 2: "Love Ain't Here Anymore" - Take That & "Still Got the Blues"- Gary Moore
- Recall 3: "Lady Madonna - The Beatles

Theme (date)	Song	Original artist	Place/Percentage
The Top 15 - Now or Never (28 February 2009)	Oh! Darling	The Beatles	17.83% (2/15)
Top 10 - Greatest Hits (7 March 2009)	The Great Pretender	Freddie Mercury	12.61% (4/10)
Top 9 - Geschlechtertausch (14 March 2009)	Black Velvet	Alannah Myles	15.39% (2/9)
Top 8 - Party Hits (21 March 2009)	We Are the Champions	Queen	12.62% (3/8)
Top 7 - Sexy Hits (4 April 2009)	Still Got the Blues	Gary Moore	8.14% (7/7)

=== Marc Jentzen ===
Marc Jentzen (born 21 August 1987 in Bonn) taught at Star Camp after his elimination.

Theme (date)	Song	Original artist	Place/Percentage
The Top 15 - Now or Never (28 February 2009)	Breathe Easy	Blue	4.36% (8/15)
Top 10 - Greatest Hits (7 March 2009)	End of the Road	Boyz II Men	7.03% (7/10)
Top 9 - Geschlechtertausch (14 March 2009)	I Kissed a Girl	Katy Perry	7.40% (6/9)
Top 8 - Party Hits (21 March 2009)	Celebration	Kool & the Gang	7.62% (8/8)

=== Benny Kieckhäben ===
Benny Kieckhäben (born 11 February 1990) is known for his unexpected audition due to way he looked. He was put through by all three judges after singing "If I Ever Fall in Love". Since, he has become somewhat of a favorite in the competition, although has been in the bottom every week, due to his good-sounding voice and his use of props (such as a cage in his performance of "Don't Cha"). He is openly gay. Throughout the competition, he was known to sing songs by female artists.

- Audition: "If I Ever Fall in Love" - Shai
- Recall 1: "And I Am Telling You I'm Not Going" - Jennifer Holliday
- Recall 2: N/A
- Recall 3: "End of the Road" - Boyz II Men

Theme (date)	Song	Original artist	Place/Percentage
The Top 15 - Now or Never (28 February 2009)	Hurt	Christina Aguilera	3.79% (10/15)
Top 10 - Greatest Hits (7 March 2009)	So Sick	Ne-Yo	5.67% (8/10)
Top 9 - Geschlechtertausch (14 March 2009)	Like a Virgin	Madonna	6.55% (8/9)
Top 8 - Party Hits (21 March 2009)	What Is Love	Haddaway	9.37% (7/8)
Top 7 - Sexy Hits (4 April 2009)	Don't Cha	The Pussycat Dolls	8.85% (6/7)
Top 6 - Aktuelle Hits & I Love You (11 April 2009)	Closer	Ne-Yo	13.16% (5/6)
Top 6 - Aktuelle Hits & I Love You (11 April 2009)	Und wenn ein Lied	Söhne Mannheims	13.16% (5/6)
Top 5 - Sonne und Regen (18 April 2009)	Walking on Sunshine	Katrina and the Waves	13.27% (5/5)
Top 5 - Sonne und Regen (18 April 2009)	When the Rain Begins to Fall	Pia Zadora & Jermaine Jackson	13.27% (5/5)

=== Sarah Kreuz ===
Sarah Kreuz (born 27 July 1989 in Bergheim) lives in Poppenhausen near Schweinfurt. She has consistent high placings in the show and has been a contest winner.

Theme (date)	Song	Original artist	Place/Percentage
The Top 15 - Now or Never (28 February 2009)	Listen	Beyoncé Knowles	12.99% (3/15)
Top 10 - Greatest Hits (7 March 2009)	I Have Nothing	Whitney Houston	16.61% (2/10)
Top 9 - Geschlechtertausch (14 March 2009)	You Raise Me Up	Westlife	12.45% (4/9)
Top 8 - Party Hits (21 March 2009)	I Will Survive	Gloria Gaynor	11.74% (5/8)
Top 7 - Sexy Hits (4 April 2009)	The Trouble with Love Is	Kelly Clarkson	19.04% (2/7)
Top 6 - Aktuelle Hits & I Love You (11 April 2009)	Unforgettable	Nat King Cole	19.68% (1/6)
Top 6 - Aktuelle Hits & I Love You (11 April 2009)	If I Were a Boy	Beyoncé Knowles	19.68% (1/6)
Top 5 - Sonne und Regen (18 April 2009)	You Are the Sunshine of My Life	Stevie Wonder	15.04% (4/5)
Top 5 - Sonne und Regen (18 April 2009)	It's Raining Men	The Weather Girls	15.04% (4/5)
Top 4 - Movie songs & Unplugged (25 April 2009)	I Will Always Love You	Whitney Houston	31.94% (1/4)
Top 4 - Movie songs & Unplugged (25 April 2009)	Warwick Avenue	Duffy	31.94% (1/4)
Top 3 - Uptempo, Power ballad & No. 1 Hits (2 May 2009)	I'm Outta Love	Anastacia	46.21% (1/3)
Top 3 - Uptempo, Power ballad & No. 1 Hits (2 May 2009)	One Moment in Time	Whitney Houston	46.21% (1/3)
Top 3 - Uptempo, Power ballad & No. 1 Hits (2 May 2009)	Für dich	Yvonne Catterfeld	46.21% (1/3)
Top 2 - Finale - Singer's choice, Highlight Song, Winner's Single (9 May 2009)	(You Make Me Feel Like) A Natural Woman	Aretha Franklin	49,53% (2/2)
Top 2 - Finale - Singer's choice, Highlight Song, Winner's Single (9 May 2009)	I Will Always Love You	Whitney Houston	49,53% (2/2)
Top 2 - Finale - Singer's choice, Highlight Song, Winner's Single (9 May 2009)	Anything but love	Daniel Schuhmacher	49,53% (2/2)

=== Vanessa Neigert ===
Vanessa Neigert (born 11 July 1992 in Tevillo, Italy)

Theme (date)	Song	Original artist	Place/Percentage
The Top 15 - Now or Never (28 February 2009)	Schöner fremder Mann	Connie Francis	6.05% (5/15)
Top 10 - Greatest Hits (7 March 2009)	Er gehört zu mir	Marianne Rosenberg	7.13% (6/10)
Top 9 - Geschlechtertausch (14 March 2009)	Über den Wolken	Reinhard Mey	11.40% (5/9)
Top 8 - Party Hits (21 March 2009)	Ich will 'nen Cowboy als Mann	Gitte Hænning	10.03% (6/8)
Top 7 - Sexy Hits (4 April 2009)	Yes Sir, I Can Boogie	Baccara	9.75% (5/7)
Top 6 - Aktuelle Hits & I Love You (11 April 2009)	Liebeskummer lohnt sich nicht	Siw Malmkvist	12.98% (6/6)
Top 6 - Aktuelle Hits & I Love You (11 April 2009)	Gib mir Sonne	Rosenstolz	12.98% (6/6)

=== Cornelia Patzlsperger ===
Cornelia Patzlsperger (born 16 July 1979 in Bad Tölz)

Theme (date)	Song	Original artist	Place/Percentage
The Top 15 - Now or Never (28 February 2009)	Time After Time	Cyndi Lauper	1.38% (13/15)
Top 10 - Greatest Hits (7 March 2009)	Mercy	Duffy	11.52% (5/10)
Top 9 - Geschlechtertausch (14 March 2009)	Your Song	Elton John	4.60% (9/9)

=== Daniel Schuhmacher ===
Daniel Schuhmacher (born 19 April 1987 in Pfullendorf) is the season 6 winner of Deutschland sucht den Superstar.

Theme (date)	Song	Original artist	Place/Percentage
The Top 15 - Now or Never (28 February 2009)	Broken Strings	James Morrison	10.63% (4/15)
Top 10 - Greatest Hits (7 March 2009)	If You Don't Know Me by Now	Simply Red	13.97% (3/10)
Top 9 - Geschlechtertausch (14 March 2009)	Irgendwas bleibt	Silbermond	13.11% (3/9)
Top 8 - Party Hits (21 March 2009)	Sweet Dreams (Are Made of This)	Eurythmics	18.39% (1/8)
Top 7 - Sexy Hits (4 April 2009)	Sexual Healing	Marvin Gaye	21.29% (1/7)
Top 6 - Aktuelle Hits & I Love You (11 April 2009)	You Give Me Something	James Morrison	15.88% (4/6)
Top 6 - Aktuelle Hits & I Love You (11 April 2009)	Allein Allein	Polarkreis 18	15.88% (4/6)
Top 5 - Sonne und Regen (18 April 2009)	Here Comes the Rain Again	Eurythmics	32.68% (1/5)
Top 5 - Sonne und Regen (18 April 2009)	Ain't No Sunshine	Bill Withers	32.68% (1/5)
Top 4 - Movie songs & Unplugged (25 April 2009)	Take My Breath Away	Berlin	26.59% (2/4)
Top 4 - Movie songs & Unplugged (25 April 2009)	You Are So Beautiful	Joe Cocker	26.59% (2/4)
Top 3 - Uptempo, Power ballad & No. 1 Hits (2 May 2009)	Rehab	Amy Winehouse	33.81% (2/3)
Top 3 - Uptempo, Power ballad & No. 1 Hits (2 May 2009)	Get Here	Oleta Adams	33.81% (2/3)
Top 3 - Uptempo, Power ballad & No. 1 Hits (2 May 2009)	Stand by Me	Ben E. King	33.81% (2/3)
Top 2 - Finale - Singer's choice, Highlight Song, Winner's Single (9 May 2009)	Soulmate	Natasha Bedingfield	50.47% (1/2)
Top 2 - Finale - Singer's choice, Highlight Song, Winner's Single (9 May 2009)	Ain't No Sunshine	Bill Withers	50.47% (1/2)
Top 2 - Finale - Singer's choice, Highlight Song, Winner's Single (9 May 2009)	Anything but Love	The Winner's song	50.47% (1/2)

== Elimination chart ==
Legend
Female	Male	Top 15	Top 10	Winner

Safe	Safe First	Safe Last	Eliminated

Stage:		Top 15	Finals								
Week:		2/28	3/7	3/14	3/21	4/4	4/11	4/18	4/25	5/2	5/9
Place	Contestant	Result									
1	Daniel Schuhmacher	Viewers					Btm 3		Btm 3	Btm 2	Winner
2	Sarah Kreuz	Viewers						Btm 2			Runner-Up
3	Annemarie Eilfeld	Judges	Btm 2	Btm 3					Btm 2	Elim	
4	Dominik Büchele	Viewers						Btm 3	Elim		
5	Benny Kieckhäben	Judges	Btm 3	Btm 2	Btm 2	Btm 2	Btm 2	Elim			
6	Vanessa Neigert	Viewers			Btm 3	Btm 3	Elim				
7	Holger Göpfert	Viewers				Elim					
8	Marc Jentzen	Judges			Elim						
9	Cornelia Patzelsberger	Judges		Elim							
10	Michelle Bowers	Saved	Elim								
Quit	Vanessa Civiello	Judges	Wdrw								
12-15	Tobias Rößler	Elim									
12-15	Roshan Paul	Elim									
12-15	Florian Ehlers	Elim									
12-15	Fausta Giordano	Elim									
