= Guitars for Wounded Warriors =

Studio album by Brian Tarquin
- Released: August 2014
- Recorded: July 2012–March 2013
- Studio: Jungle Room Studios
- Genre: Jazz fusion, instrumental guitar
- Length: 44:00
- Label: Cleopatra
- Producer: Brian Tarquin

Brian Tarquin chronology
Fretworx (2008)	Guitars for Wounded Warriors (2014)	Smooth Jazz Cafe (2014)

Singles from Brian Tarquin & Heavy Friends Guitars For Wounded Warriors
- 1. "Black Hawk, Taliban Terror, Escape Kabul"

Guitars for Wounded Warriors is the sixth solo studio album by guitarist Brian Tarquin, released in August 2014 by Cleopatra Records. In 2016, it received a Best Compilation Album nomination by the Independent Music Awards. All tracks were recorded at Tarquin's Jungle Room Studios in New Paltz (village), New York. Being moved by the lack of support for returning veterans through his life Tarquin decided to compose a heavy instrumental rock album as a way to show his appreciation to all veterans. So once again he enlisted top notch players to guest with him on the album, Billy Sheehan on Black Hawk, Ron "Bumblefoot" Thal and Reb Beach on Taliban Terror, Steve Morse on Freedom, Chris Poland on Charlie Surfs and Hunting, Chuck Loeb on Escape Kabul, Hal Lindes on Sand & Blood, Gary Hoey on 5 Klicks To Hell and Baghdad, Alex De Rosso Dokken on Broken Arrow, and The Flyin' Ryan Brothers on Surgical Strike. The entire album was engineered, produced and composed by Tarquin especially for each one of the guest guitarists. Partial proceeds are donated to the Fisher House Foundation from sales.

== Critical reception ==
Guitars For Wounded Warriors was received very well by critics. Michael Molenda editor & chief at Guitar Player magazine stated "Tarquin crafted cinematic soundscapes that opened things up for the guitars to be much more than just solo instruments." John Heidt at Vintage Guitar (magazine) wrote "Tarquin anchors the melodic-yet-tough tunes while guests Steve Morse, Reb Beach, Billy Sheehan, Gary Hoey, and others contribute dazzling parts." Andrew King at Professional Sound magazine explains "…his passion for purity is more than evident – in both the music he makes and the way it's recorded."

== Track listing ==
No.	Title	Music	Length
1.	"Black Hawk featuring Billy Sheehan"	Brian Tarquin	2:52
2.	"Taliban Terror featuring Ron "Bumblefoot" Thal and Reb Beach"	Brian Tarquin	4:27
3.	"Charlie Surfs featuring Chris Poland"	Brian Tarquin	3:58
4.	"5 Klicks To Hell featuring Gary Hoey"	Brian Tarquin	4:24
5.	"Surgical Strike featuring The Flyin' Ryan Brothers"	Brian Tarquin	3:14
6.	"Hunting featuring Chris Poland"	Brian Tarquin	3:28
7.	"Baghdad featuring Gary Hoey"	Brian Tarquin	3:18
8.	"Broken Arrow featuring Alex De Rosso"	Brian Tarquin	3:35
9.	"Sand & Blood featuring Hal Lindes"	Brian Tarquin	4:51
10.	"Escape Kabul featuring Chuck Loeb"	Brian Tarquin	3:25
11.	"Freedom featuring Steve Morse"	Brian Tarquin	6:00

== Personnel ==
- Brian Tarquin – all guitars
- Reggie Pryor – drums
- Rick Mullen – bass
- Julian Baker – piano and strings (track 11)
- Billy Sheehan – Bass (track 1)
- Ron "Bumblefoot" Thal – guitar (track 2)
- Reb Beach – guitar (track 2)
- Chris Poland – guitar (track 3 & 6)
- Gary Hoey – guitar (tracks 4 & 7)
- The Flyin' Ryan Brothers – guitar (track 5)
- Alex De Rosso – guitar (track 8)
- Hal Lindes – guitar (track 9)
- Chuck Loeb – guitar (track 10)
- Steve Morse – guitar (track 11)
- Brian Tarquin – mix engineer, producer
- David Glasser of Airshow – mastering engineer
- Eric Christian – photography
- Miss M and Brian Tarquin – graphic design
