= Fretworx =

Studio album by Brian Tarquin
- Released: October 2008
- Recorded: July 2007–June 2008
- Studio: Jungle Room Studios
- Genre: Jazz fusion, instrumental guitar
- Length: 80:00
- Label: Instinct
- Producer: Brian Tarquin

Brian Tarquin chronology
High Life (2001)	Fretworx (2008)	Brian Tarquin & Heavy Friends Guitars for Wounded Warriors (2014)

Singles from Fretworx
- 1. "Solidarity, Blue Wind, Spanish Harlem"

Fretworx is the fifth solo studio album by guitarist Brian Tarquin, released in October 2008 on Nu Groove/BHP Music distributed by RED Distribution. All tracks were recorded in New York, at Tarquin's Jungle Room Studios. Guest musicians on the album include Billy Sheehan, Frank Gambale, Steve Morse, Max Middleton, Chuck Loeb, Hal Lindes, Andy Timmons, and Will Ray. The album also featured bonus tracks from Steve Vai & Randy Coven, Carlos Santana and Tommy Bolin. The entire album was engineered, produced, and composed by Tarquin with the exception of the bonus tracks.

== Track listing ==
No.	Title	Music	Length
1.	"Blue Wind" (featuring Billy Sheehan and Doug Doppler)	Jan Hammer	3:55
2.	"Spanish Harlem" (featuring Frank Gambale)	Brian Tarquin	3:37
3.	"Towers" (featuring Steve Morse)	Tarquin	5:16
4.	"Constantinople" (featuring Will Ray)	Tarquin	4:32
5.	"86th Street" (featuring Randy Coven)	Tarquin	5:19
6.	"Solidarity" (featuring Max Middleton)	Tarquin	4:03
7.	"Dionysus" (featuring Randy Coven)	Tarquin	3:17
8.	"Manhattan" (featuring Andy Timmons)	Tarquin	3:52
9.	"Black Rose"	Tarquin	4:31
10.	"Aphrodite" (featuring Hal Lindes)	Tarquin	4:41
11.	"Jungle Room Boogie" (featuring Max Middleton)	Tarquin	3:56
12.	"Tears"	Tarquin	3:16
13.	"Yorkville" (featuring Chuck Loeb)	Tarquin	4:43
14.	"Westside Highway" (featuring James Ryan)	Tarquin	3:37
15.	"Triumphant We Stand" (featuring Steve Booke)	Tarquin	4:13

Bonus tracks
No.	Title	Music	Length
16.	"Funk Me Tender" (featuring Steve Vai)	Randy Coven	5:17
17.	"Jam In E" (featuring Carlos Santana)	Carlos Santana	8:33
18.	"Homeward Strut" (featuring Tommy Bolin)	Tommy Bolin	3:00
Total length:			80:00

== Personnel ==
- Brian Tarquin – all guitars
- Chris Ingram – keyboard, bass
- Reggie Pryor – drums, percussion
- Greg Morrow – drums
- Johnny Mascaluso – drums (track 8)
- Billy Sheehan – Bass (track 1)
- Doug Doppler – guitar (track 1)
- Frank Gambale – guitar (track 2)
- Steve Morse – guitar (track 3)
- Will Ray – guitar (track 4)
- Randy Coven – guitar (tracks 5 & 7)
- Max Middleton – Rhodes piano (tracks 6 & 11)
- Andy Timmons – guitar (track 8)
- Hal Lindes – guitar (track 10)
- Rob Balducci – guitar (track 12)
- Chuck Loeb – guitar (track 13)
- James Ryan – guitar (track 14)
- Steve Booke – guitar (track 15)
- Todd Turkisher – drums (track 16)
- Jim Hickey – guitars (track 16)
- Neal Schon – guitars (track 17)
- Greg Rollie – keyboard (track 17)
- Michael Shrieve – drums (track 17)
- Chepito Areas – percussion (track 17)
- Carlos Santana – lead guitar (track 17)
- David Brown – bass (track 17)
- Michael Carabello – congas (track 17)
- Tommy Bolin – guitars (track 18)
- Brian Tarquin – mix engineer, producer
- Chris Landen of Pacific Coast Mastering – mastering engineer
- Todd Doney – cover painting
- Miss M – graphic design
