= Orlando in Heaven =

Studio album by Brian Tarquin
- Released: June 2017
- Recorded: July 2015–September 2016
- Studio: Jungle Room Studios
- Genre: Jazz fusion, instrumental guitar
- Length: 53:15
- Label: Cleopatra
- Producer: Brian Tarquin

Brian Tarquin chronology
Smooth Jazz Cafe (2014)	Orlando in Heaven (2017)	Band of Brothers (2017)

Singles from Brian Tarquin & Company Orlando in Heaven
- 1. "Metropolis, Kinda Sorta, Orlando In Heaven"

Orlando in Heaven is the eighth solo studio album by guitarist Brian Tarquin, released on June 9, 2017, by Cleopatra Records. It peaked #6 on the Relix Jam Band Radio charts October 2017. All tracks were recorded at Tarquin's Jungle Room Studios in Merritt Island, Florida. Being especially moved by the Pulse Nightclub shooting in 2016, Tarquin composed and produced the songs especially for those victims. It features guest guitar icon Larry Coryell (his final recordings before his passing in 2017), vocalist Phil Naro, Grammy jazz guitarist Mike Stern, fretless bass player Tony Franklin (Jimmy Page/Blue Murder), Chris Poland (Megadeth), Hal Lindes (Dire Straits), Will Ray (The Hellecasters), jazz keyboardist Bob Baldwin (musician) & Grammy nominee Denny Jiosa. A portion of proceeds is donated to Catholic Charities of Central Florida. They provide case management and supportive services for victims and family members of the Pulse shooting in Orlando.

== Track listing ==
No.	Title	Music	Length
1.	"Orlando In Heaven featuring Phil Naro & Hal Lindes"	Brian Tarquin, John Leach, Reggie Pryor	3:40
2.	"Madame Shanghai featuring Bob Baldwin (musician)"	Brian Tarquin. Reggie Pryor	5:03
3.	"Pulse 49 featuring Larry Coryell & Phil Naro"	Brian Tarquin, Phil Naro, Reggie Pryor	5:21
4.	"Hustle & Hassle featuring Chris Poland"	Brian Tarquin, Reggie Pryor	6:51
5.	"Metropolis featuring Larry Coryell"	Brian Tarquin, Reggie Pryor	4:10
6.	"Kinda Sorta featuring Mike Stern & Denny Jiosa"	Brian Tarquin, Reggie Pryor	5:25
7.	"La Nocha Triste featuring Will Ray"	Brian Tarquin, Reggie Pryor	5:20
8.	"She Used To Be A Lady featuring Bob Baldwin (musician)"	Brian Tarquin, Reggie Pryor	4:04
9.	"Tropical Trail featuring Tony Franklin"	Brian Tarquin, Reggie Pryor	4:37
10.	"Jacob's Ladder featuring Hal Lindes"	Brian Tarquin, Reggie Pryor, Hal Lindes	4:49
11.	"Orlando In Heaven (instrumental) featuring Hal Lindes"	Brian Tarquin, Reggie Pryor, Hal Lindes	3:36

== Personnel ==
- Brian Tarquin – rhythm, melody & solo guitars & bass on tracks 7 & 10
- Reggie Pryor – drums
- Rick Mullen – bass (tracks 4, 6, 8)
- Brandon Miller – bass (tracks 4, 6, 8)
- Juan Tobon – rhodes and strings (tracks 1, 5, 7, 9, 11)
- Ryan De Sade Way – rhodes and synth (tracks 2, 4, 5, 6, 8, 10 )
- Hal Lindes – guest guitar solo (track 1, 10 & 11)
- Bob Baldwin (musician) – piano & synth (track 2 & 8)
- Larry Coryell – guest guitar solo (track 3 & 5)
- Chris Poland – guest guitar solo (track 4)
- Phil Naro – vocals (tracks 1 & 3)
- Mike Stern – guest guitar solo (track 6)
- Denny Jiosa – guest guitar solo (track 6)
- Will Ray – guest guitar solo (track 7)
- Tony Franklin – fretless bass (tracks 9)
- Brian Tarquin – mix engineer, producer
- Additional vocal recording by Frank Tassone
- David Glasser of Airshow & Geoff Gray – mastering engineers
- Miss M and Brian Tarquin – graphic design
