= Dominik Büchele =

German singer

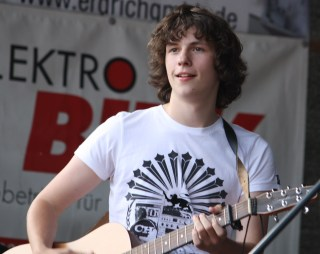
Büchele in 2009

Dominik Büchele (born 23 February 1991) is a German singer who finished fourth in season 6 of Deutschland sucht den Superstar (DSDS).

== Early life ==
Inspired by James Blunt, Büchele founded his band "Umleitung" and gained first stage experience on local level. Asked about his plans for his future after school, he would answer "making music, attending a high school for music, becoming a professional singer-songwriter". To reach those aims, he took part in a German castingshow in 2009, reaching #4 out of 32.000 participants.

== Career ==
=== DSDS ===
Büchele got one of the 15 tickets for the live shows by performing a James Blunt cover what caused an occasional comparison to Blunt. During the live performances, he grew as one of the favourites of this TV show

Büchele, Daniel Schuhmacher and Sarah Kreuz were not on speaking terms with the other candidate, Annemarie Eilfeld, when the top 4 happened.

=== 2009–2012 ===
Signing his first contract as a professional artist right after those TV appearances, Büchele's dreams began to come true. In 2010, he published his first single "Closer to heaven" and album "Ready", and being on the road in Germany and Austria (2009/10), he gave over 50 gigs including being support act of the "Puhdys". In 2011, his second album "Again" including the single "Hazel Eyes" was released. This album debuts two of his self-written songs, "Salvation" and "For the Last Time". Since then, he focusses on writing songs, performing live at chosen events including charities and attending the International Music College of Freiburg with the majors songwriting and producing.

Büchele has started a joint project with Sebastian Wurth.

=== Since 2013 ===
On stage, Büchele and his band "Umleitung" performed playlists made up of self-composed songs, catching some media attention.

In June 2014, Büchele released his demo album "Umleitung", autonomously composed and produced. In November 2014, the first single release "Colours" was released as a download version.

After presenting his debut album "Colours" under his band's name "Umleitung" and successful graduation at the International Music College in Freiburg in 2016, Büchele followed the Pacific Crest Trail the year after, gaining many inspirations for new songs like "Heading North", released in December 2017. In February 2018, Büchele's third solo-album "The Journey" was released.

== Discography ==
=== Singles ===
Year	Title	Peak chart positions			Album
Year	Title	GER	AUT	SWI	Album
2010	Closer to Heaven	27	37		Ready
2010	Brand New Day				Ready
2011	Hazel Eyes	43			Again

=== Albums ===
Year	Title	Peak chart positions		
Year	Title	GER	AUT	SWI
2010	Ready	22	30	
2011	Again	36	60	
