= Gary Hoey (album) =

Studio album by Gary Hoey
- Released: 1995
- Genre: Rock
- Label: Surfdog Records
- Producer: Gary Hoey

Gary Hoey chronology
'Endless Summer II Soundtrack (1994)	Gary Hoey (1995)	Ho! Ho! Hoey (1995)

Professional ratings
Review scores
Source	Rating
Allmusic	2.5/5 stars

Gary Hoey is the 1995 self-titled release by instrumental rock guitarist Gary Hoey. Originally released in Germany in 1989 as “Get A Grip” with a different track listing and mix.

== Track listing ==
1. High-Top Bop (Gary Hoey, Lori Weinhouse)
2. Get A Grip (Gary Hoey, Lori Weinhouse)
3. Strat Strut (Gary Hoey)
4. Mr. Mover (Gary Hoey)
5. City Sunrise (Gary Hoey, Lori Weinhouse)
6. Says Who? (Gary Hoey, Lori Weinhouse)
7. Stack Attack (Gary Hoey)
8. Rainbow Warrior (Gary Hoey, Lori Weinhouse)
9. Lost Dreams (Gary Hoey)

== Personnel ==
- Gary Hoey: Guitar
- Nick South: Bass
- Frankie Banali: Drums, Percussion

Additional musicians:

- Tony Franklin: Bass (on High-Top Bop)
- Lori Weinhouse: Keyboards

Studio:

- Engineered by: Sebastian Thorer
- Additional engineering by: Jean-Marie Horvat
- Mixed by: Jean-Marie Horvat
- Mastered by: Bernie Grundman
