= Pema Browne =

American artist

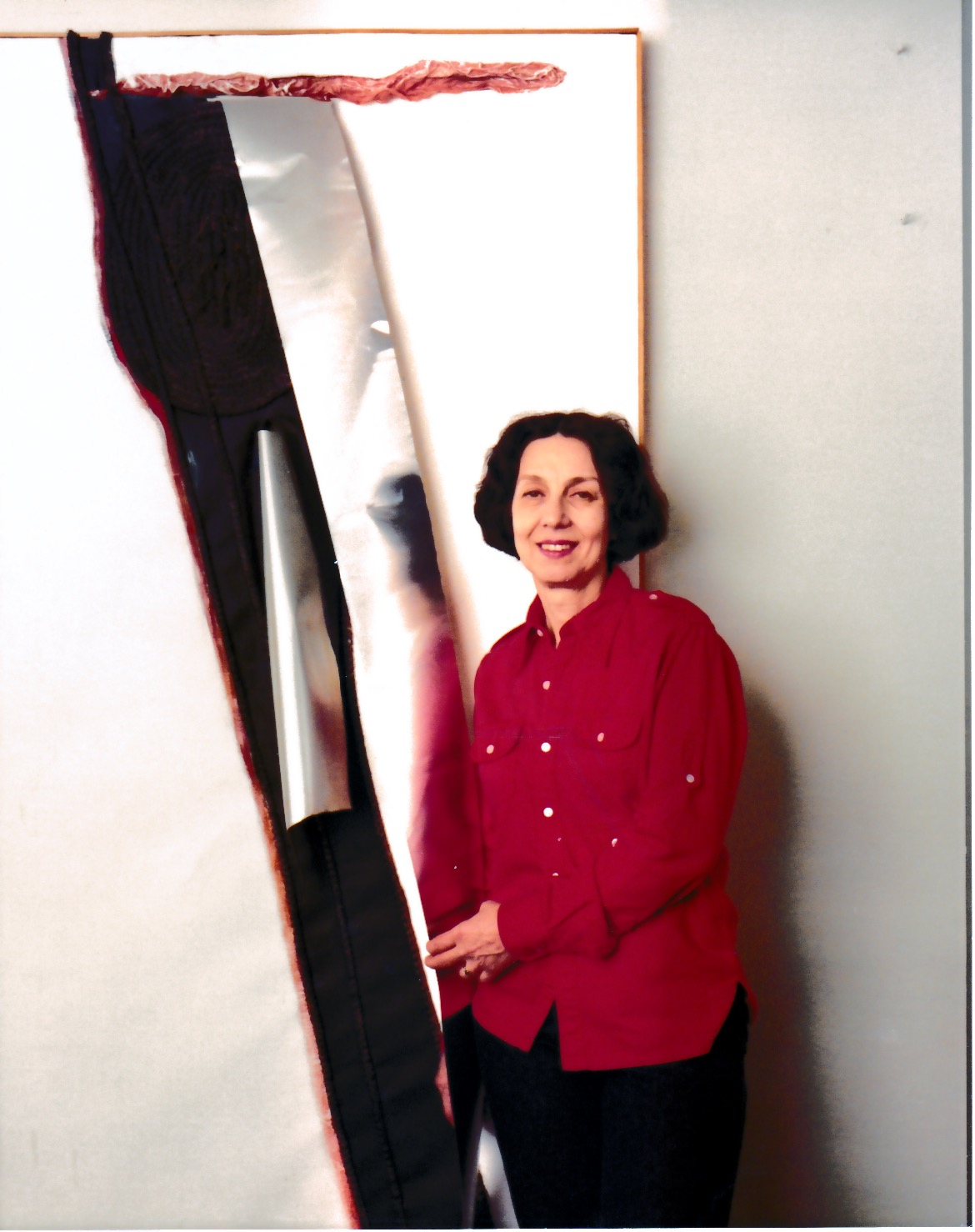
- Pema Browne with artwork, 1980
- Born: Eudoxia Pema / Dorothy Pema; February 8, 1928; Atlantic City, New Jersey, U.S.
- Died: July 8, 2018 (aged 90); Melbourne, Florida, U.S.
- Education: Moore College of Art and Design
- Known for: Painting, Mixed media
- Movement: Contemporary art, Dada

Pema Browne (February 8, 1928 – July 8, 2018) was an American abstract artist known for Ambush In November, part of the permanent collection of the John F. Kennedy Presidential Library and Museum; and Roads, exhibited at the 1964 New York World's Fair at the Greyhound Pavilion. She was a modern artist based in New York City. She worked with oils and watercolor in her early career and mixed media, fabric, and metal on canvas in her later years.

In 1954 she was recognized with a Hallmark Fine Arts Award. As an artists' representative, Browne had one of the first woman-owned businesses in New York City, Pema Browne, Ltd., founded in 1966, which represented both commercial photographers and illustrators.

== Early years and education ==
The daughter of an Albanian restaurateur, she was born Dorothy Pema in Atlantic City, New Jersey. At the onset of the Great Depression, the family relocated to Greensboro, North Carolina to pursue more favorable business opportunities. In her mid-teens, she returned to the Mid-Atlantic with her family, settling in Darby, Pennsylvania.

Educated at Moore College of Art and Design in Philadelphia, and The Barnes Foundation at its original Merion, Pennsylvania location, her critical acclaim began with a watercolor that was part of the 2nd International Hallmark Art Awards Exhibition, submitted under the name Dorothy Pema Wiley. This traveling exhibition visited the Wildenstein Gallery, the Carnegie Museums of Pittsburgh, the Dallas Museum of Fine Arts, Institute of Contemporary Art, Boston, among others, from 1952 to 1953.

== Professional life ==
After early successes in painting, Browne explored facets of modern art with mixed media including fabric and metal on canvas.

Advertising Age Magazine called her "a leading light in the avant-garde constructionism movement." She is named in the CLARA database of Women Artists.

== Literary agent ==
In the late 1970s, Dorothy Pema, with her second husband Perry J. Browne, became a literary agent with a specialty in representing authors of children's literature and illustrators of children's books. Browne was also known as a "spirit-friendly" literary agent, and occasionally represented New Age spiritual authors.

== Notable solo exhibitions ==
- Dubin Art Gallery, Philadelphia, oil paintings and drawings
- Bodley Gallery, paintings, September–October, 1963
- East Hampton Gallery, paintings, August–September, 1964

== Reviews ==
- Recent Openings: New York Times, October 5, 1963

== Works viewable online ==
- Christmas Carols

== Feature articles ==
- Mosaic Tiles Inspired by Memory of Mexico
