= Smooth Jazz Cafe =

Studio album by Brian Tarquin
- Released: September 2014
- Recorded: July 2012–December 2013
- Studio: Jungle Room Studios
- Genre: Rock fusion, instrumental guitar
- Length: 60:00
- Label: Purple Pyramid
- Producer: Brian Tarquin

Brian Tarquin chronology
Brian Tarquin & Heavy Friends Guitars for Wounded Warriors (2014)	Smooth Jazz Cafe (2014)	Orlando In Heaven (2017)

Singles from Smooth Jazz Cafe
- 1. "On The Brick, Zoot Suit, The Big Sleep"

Smooth Jazz Cafe is the seventh solo studio album by guitarist Brian Tarquin, released in October 2014 by Cleopatra Records/Purple Pyramid. The album was recorded at Tarquin's mobile Jungle Room Studios in the New York Catskill Mountains at a 200 year old Farmhouse. Additional recording was done in the quaint town of New Paltz (village), New York. Tarquin reached out to some old guitar friends to guest with him on the album, Chuck Loeb on Zoot Suit, Hal Lindes on The Big Sleep & Birdbrain, and Denny Jiosa on Hipster & Chrome Dome. The entire album was engineered, produced and performed by Tarquin. Most of the album is new material with exception of 4 songs, Peg, Swift Kick, Yorkville and Spanish Harlem.

== Critical reception ==
Smooth Jazz Cafe received favorable reviews. John Heidt at Vintage Guitar (magazine) wrote "...harkens to Tarquin's days as a hitmaker working with acid-jazz producer Ernie McKone." Brent Black at Critical Jazz states "Six string aficionados will have plenty to cheer..." G.W. Hill of Music Street Journal stated "I think this is a great, and often exciting, jazz album."

== Track listing ==
No.	Title	Music	Length
1.	"Zoot Suit" (featuring Chuck Loeb)	Brian Tarquin, Chuck Loeb, Rick Mullen	3:41
2.	"Peg" (featuring Chuck Loeb)	Walter Becker, Donald Fagen	4:41
3.	"Swift Kick" (featuring Chuck Loeb)	Tarquin	4:18
4.	"Yorkville" (featuring Chuck Loeb)	Tarquin	4:43
5.	"The Big Sleep" (featuring Hal Lindes)	Tarquin, Mullen	3:44
6.	"On the Brick" (featuring Brian Tarquin)	Tarquin, Mullen	3:41
7.	"Hipster" (featuring Denny Jiosa)	Tarquin, Mullen	4:09
8.	"Frolic Room" (featuring Brian Tarquin)	Tarquin, Mullen	3:55
9.	"Birdbrain" (featuring Hal Lindes)	Tarquin, Mullen	3:46
10.	"Boogie Man" (featuring Brian Tarquin)	Tarquin, Mullen	3:48
11.	"Chrome Dome" (featuring Denny Jiosa)	Tarquin, Mullen
12.	"The Dutchess" (featuring Brian Tarquin)	Tarquin, Mullen	3:28
13.	"Spanish Harlem" (featuring Frank Gambale)	Brian Tarquin	3:36
14.	"Drugstore Cowboy" (featuring Brian Tarquin)	Tarquin, Mullen	4:15
15.	"Nowheresville" (featuring Brian Tarquin)	Tarquin, Mullen	3:31
Total length:			60:00

== Personnel ==
- Brian Tarquin – all guitars
- Reggie Pryor – drums
- Rick Mullen – bass
- Julian Baker – piano and strings (track 11)
- Chuck Loeb – guitar (tracks 1–4)
- Denny Jiosa – guitar (tracks 7 & 11)
- Hal Lindes – guitar (track 5 & 9)
- Frank Gambale – guitar (tracks 13)
- Brian Tarquin – mix engineer, producer
- David Glasser of Airshow – mastering engineer
- Chris Landen at Audio Mechanics – mastering engineer
- Miss M and Brian Tarquin – graphic design
