= Band of Brothers (Brian Tarquin album) =

Studio album by Brian Tarquin
- Released: July 2017
- Recorded: January 2015 – October 2016
- Studio: Jungle Room Studios
- Genre: Hard rock, heavy metal, instrumental guitar
- Length: 38:54
- Label: Cleopatra
- Producer: Brian Tarquin

Brian Tarquin chronology
Orlando In Heaven (2017)	Band of Brothers (2017)

Singles from Band of Brothers
- 1. "Pull The Trigger On PTSD, Sands of Time, Night Patrol"

Band of Brothers is the ninth solo studio album by guitarist Brian Tarquin, released on July 7, 2017, by Cleopatra Records. It peaked #21 on the Metal Contraband Radio charts September 2017. All tracks were recorded at Tarquin's Jungle Room Studios in Merritt Island, Florida and first predominantly vocal album recorded by Brian. Tarquin composed and produced the songs especially for military veterans along with singer Phil Naro from Billy Sheehan’s band Talas. It features guest appearances by singer Jeff Scott Soto (Journey, Trans-Siberian Orchestra), Steve Morse (Deep Purple), Ron 'Bumblefoot' Thal (ex-Guns N' Roses), Trey Gunn (King Crimson), Jeff Watson (Night Ranger), Joel Hoekstra (Whitesnake), Gary Hoey, Tony Franklin (Jimmy Page, Blue Murder) and Tina Guo (Al Di Meola). Partial proceeds from the sales go to the Fisher House Foundation, who supplies housing to veterans' families while they are hospitalized.

== Track listing ==
No.	Title	Music	Guest musician	Length
1.	"Eastern Front"	Brian Tarquin, Phil Naro	Joel Hoekstra	4:31
2.	"Pull the Trigger on PTSD"	Brian Tarquin, Phil Naro	Ron "Bumblefoot" Thal	3:21
3.	"War Is Strictly Business"	Brian Tarquin, Phil Naro	Jeff Watson	3:31
4.	"Sands of Time"	Brian Tarquin, John Leach	Jeff Scott Soto	3:22
5.	"To Fight a War I Don’t Understand"	Brian Tarquin, Phil Naro	Tina Guo	4:23
6.	"Night Patrol"	Brian Tarquin, Phil Naro	Steve Morse	3:27
7.	"Lock & Loaded"	Brian Tarquin	Gary Hoey	4:28
8.	"Clutches of Vietnam"	Brian Tarquin, Phil Naro	Brian Tarquin	4:04
9.	"Love & War"	Brian Tarquin, Phil Naro	Tony Franklin	3:36
10.	"Alpha Bravo"	Brian Tarquin	Trey Gunn	4:51

== Personnel ==
- Brian Tarquin – rhythm, melody & solo guitars & bass on tracks 1, 2, 3, 5, 6,
- Reggie Pryor – drums
- Rick Mullen – bass (tracks 4, 7, 8, 10)
- Joel Hoekstra – guest guitar solo (1)
- Ron "Bumblefoot" Thal – guest guitar solo (track 2)
- Jeff Watson – guest guitar solo (track 3)
- Jeff Scott Soto – vocals (track 4)
- Phil Naro – vocals (tracks 1, 2, 3, 5, 6, 8, 9)
- Tina Guo – electric cello (track 5)
- Steve Morse – guest guitar solo (track 6)
- Gary Hoey – guest guitar solo (track 7)
- Tony Franklin – fretless bass (tracks 9)
- Brian Tarquin – mix engineer, producer
- Additional vocal recording by Frank Tassone
- David Glasser of Airshow & Geoff Gray – mastering engineers
- Eric Christian – photography
- Miss M and Brian Tarquin – graphic design
