= High Life (Brian Tarquin album) =

Studio album by Brian Tarquin
- Released: October 2001
- Recorded: May–August 2001
- Studio: The Farm, Jungle Room Studios
- Genre: Jazz fusion, instrumental guitar
- Length: 63:00
- Label: Instinct
- Producer: Chris Ingram, Brian Tarquin

Brian Tarquin chronology
Soft Touch (1999)	High Life (2001)	Fretworx (2008)

Singles from High Life
- 1. "Riders on the Storm, Charlemagne, Celtic Tales"

High Life is the fourth studio album by guitarist Brian Tarquin, released in October 2001 and the final one he would record for Instinct records. The album was recorded in Los Angeles at Tarquin's studio Jungle Room and in New York at his composing partner, Chris Ingram's studio, the Farm. Tarquin veered back to his rock fusion roots with the songs Razor's Edge and Spartacus. However giving into the record company's pressure for radio friendly songs the album produced the singles Riders on the Storm, originally recorded by The Doors, Celtic Tales and Charlemagne. Although the album reached the Top 40 charts at Smooth Jazz radio, Tarquin became disenchanted with the inconsistencies and water downed music of the format. Soon after the album came out he asked to be released from the record contract to pursue his pet roctronica project Asphalt Jungle while establishing his full-time composing career in television and film. Tarquin also went on to form the record imprint BHP Music to release the Guitar Master Series.

== Track listing ==
No.	Title	Music	Length
1.	"High Life"	Brian Tarquin, Chris Ingram	4:32
2.	"Lady Royale"	Brian Tarquin, Chris Ingram	4:40
3.	"Riders On The Storm"	Brian Tarquin, Chris Ingram	4:24
4.	"Celtic Tales"	Brian Tarquin, Chris Ingram	4:12
5.	"Sanctuary"	Brian Tarquin, Chris Ingram	4:55
6.	"Messiah"	Brian Tarquin, Chris Ingram	4:39
7.	"Spartacus"	Jeff Beck, Max Middleton	4:23
8.	"Charlemagne"	Brian Tarquin, Chris Ingram	3:51
9.	"Wine & Roses"	Brian Tarquin, Chris Ingram	4:26
10.	"Picasso Blue"	Brian Tarquin, Chris Ingram	4:47
11.	"Heaven & Earth"	Chris Ingram	4:48
12.	"Razor's Edge"	Brian Tarquin, Chris Ingram	4:01
13.	"Deep Blue Sea"	Brian Tarquin, Chris Ingram	4:54
14.	"Paradise Suite"	Brian Tarquin, Chris Ingram	4:28
Total length:			63:00

== Personnel ==
- Brian Tarquin – all guitars
- Chris Ingram – keyboard, drum programming bass
- Cliff Lyons – saxophone
