= Animal Instinct (Gary Hoey album) =

Studio album by Gary Hoey
- Released: March, 1993
- Recorded: March 8–21, 1993
- Genre: Hard rock
- Length: 40:20
- Label: Warner Bros./Reprise
- Producer: Gary Hoey

Gary Hoey chronology
Heavy Bones (1992)	Animal Instinct (1993)	Endless Summer II (1994)

Professional ratings
Review scores
Source	Rating
Allmusic	2.5/5 stars

Animal Instinct is the title of the 1993 début release by instrumental rock guitarist Gary Hoey. The album featured his version of the hit "Hocus Pocus", originally done by 1970s Dutch progressive rock band Focus. His band at the time consisted of a few notable names of 1980s hard rock, including ex-The Firm bassist Tony Franklin, keyboardist Claude Schnell (ex-Dio), and drummer Frankie Banali (Quiet Riot).

== Track listing ==
- All songs written by Gary Hoey, except where noted.
1. Mass Hysteria 3:40
2. Animal Instinct 3:56
3. Hocus Pocus (Akkerman, Van Leer) 3:55
4. Bert's Lounge 4:57
5. Texas Son 3:56
6. Deep South Cafe (Hoey, Lori Weinhouse) 4:39
7. Motown Fever 3:01
8. Fade To Blue (Hoey, Weinhouse) 5:52
9. Drive 4:04
10. Jamie 2:20

== Personnel ==
- Jamie Kaplan: Vocal
- Gary Hoey: Acoustic & Electric Guitars
- Claude Schnell: Keyboards
- Tony Franklin: Bass
- Frankie Banali: Drums, Percussion
