= Soft Touch (Brian Tarquin album) =

Studio album by Brian Tarquin
- Released: May 1999
- Recorded: January–March 1999
- Studio: Boogie Back Studios London, UK
- Genre: Jazz fusion, instrumental guitar
- Length: 45:00
- Label: Instinct
- Producer: Ernie McKone, Chris Ingram, Tony Campbell

Brian Tarquin chronology
Last Kiss Goodbye (1997)	Soft Touch (1999)	High Life (2001)

Singles from Soft Touch
- 1. "Darlin Darlin Baby, Tangled Web, Jive Town, Catalina Breeze"

Soft Touch is the third studio album by guitarist Brian Tarquin, released in May 1999 on Instinct records. Tarquin recorded Soft Touch in London once again with producer Ernie McKone, bass player from the UK acid jazz band Galliano. Once the tracks were all recorded, Instinct didn't want to keep the live playing on the album. This was due mainly because one of the A&R people attended a Radio & Records conference, and had noted that radio was playing programmed grooves. So two other producers Tony Campbell and Chris Ingram were brought in to program the songs and re-record everything. Despite the setbacks, this was another commercially successful album as Smooth Jazz radio embraced the featured single, Darlin Darlin Baby, originally recorded by The O'Jays. Another single from the album, Tangled Web, was a very big radio hit as well, becoming #1 in the New York City market on CD101.9 as well as reaching # 9 nationwide on the Smooth Jazz radio charts. Tarquin also covered another Jeff Beck song, You Know What I Mean.

In lieu of the experience, Tarquin came away from the recording very discouraged. The indecisiveness of the record company switching between three different producers, became a frustrating ordeal. Instinct was becoming too concerned with radio approval and less with the actual music. This period planted seeds for the future musical endeavors Tarquin would undertake in the coming years.

== Track listing ==
No.	Title	Music	Length
1.	"Darlin' Darlin' Baby"	Gamble and Huff	3:27
2.	"Sedona"	Brian Tarquin, Chris Ingram	3:37
3.	"Rainfall"	Brian Tarquin, Chris Ingram, John Mastronardi	4:47
4.	"Tangled Web"	Brian Tarquin	4:03
5.	"Jive Town"	Brian Tarquin, Chris Ingram	4:19
6.	"Catalina Breeze"	Brian Tarquin, Chris Ingram	3:51
7.	"You Know What I Mean"	Jeff Beck, Max Middleton	5:01
8.	"Read My Mind"	Brian Tarquin, Chris Ingram, John Mastronardi	4:19
9.	"Baby Come Back"	J.C. Crowley, Peter Beckett	3:32
10.	"English Rose"	Brian Tarquin, Chris Ingram	4:14
11.	"Tabatha"	Chris Ingram	3:56
Total length:			45:00

== Personnel ==
- Brian Tarquin – guitars
- Chris Ingram – keyboards, drum programming
- Guy Fortt – vocals
- Tony Campbell – drum programming, bass, keyboards
- Jim Carmichael – drums
- Crispen Taylor – drums
- Dave John-Baptiste – saxophone, flute
- Toby Baker – Fender Rhodes, clavinet, piano
- Connor Smith – percussion
- Damon Brown – trumpet
- Phil Brown – saxophone
- Ernie McKone – bass
- Cliff Lyons – saxophone
- Jacko Peake – saxophone
- Pat Lavery – bass
