= Annemarie Eilfeld =

German singer and songwriter

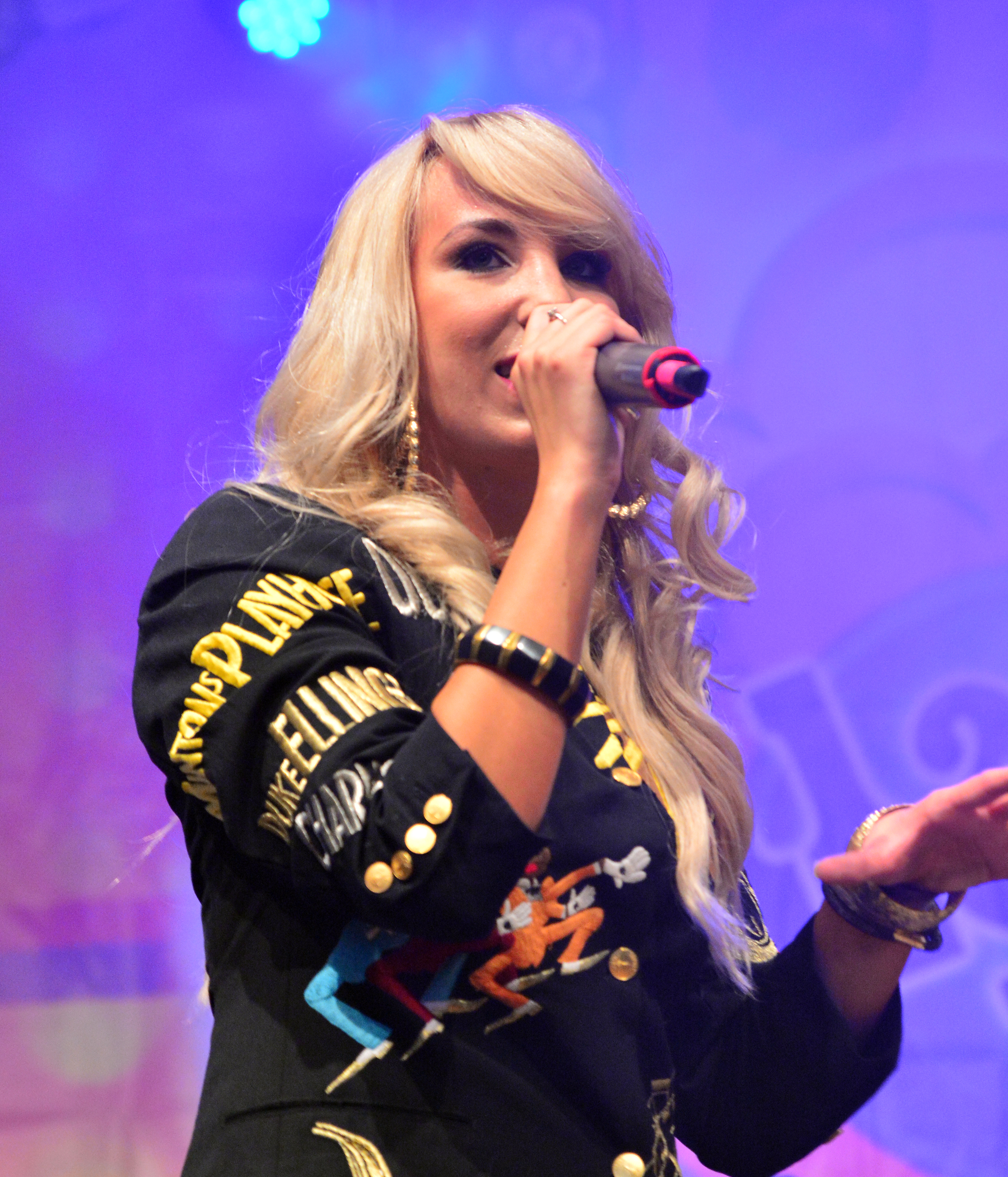
- Eilfeld performing in 2015

Background information
- Also known as: Annemie
- Born: 2 May 1990 (age 36); Lutherstadt Wittenberg, East Germany
- Genres: Electropop, electrorock
- Occupations: Singer, songwriter
- Years active: 2004–present
- Labels: X-Cell, Universal
- Website: www.annemarie-eilfeld.de

Annemarie Eilfeld (born 2 May 1990), also known as Annemie, is a German singer and songwriter, best known as a former contestant of Deutschland sucht den Superstar, the German version of the Idols franchise. She released her first single "Animal Instinct" in May 2010.

== Early life ==
Eilfeld is the daughter of a music teacher and an estate agent. In her early childhood, her family moved from Wittenberg to Dessau-Roßlau. At the age of seven, she began an education in music and dance. Over the following years, she took part in various local song contests.

== Career ==
In 2004, Eilfeld participated in Germany's casting show Star Search 2 and qualified for the finals. This was closely followed by her debut single "C the Light" (Edel Music), which appeared under the name "Anne Marie".

Between 2005 and 2008, she occasionally performed on stage with different local bands.

=== Deutschland sucht den Superstar ===
In 2009's casting show Deutschland sucht den Superstar (DSDS), broadcast on RTL, Eilfeld made it to the top three. In contrast to the generally negative views of the jury, the German tabloid Bild supported Eilfeld, who was pushed into the role of a "super-bitch" throughout the show. Due to contractual agreements, Eilfeld has had to take a three-month break from publishing new music, like all former DSDS contestants.

==== DSDS performances ====
Theme (date)	Song	Original artist	Place/Percentage
Top 15 – (28 February 2009)	"Hot n Cold"	Katy Perry	6/15 (4.57%)
Top 10 – Greatest Hits (7 March 2009)	"...Baby One More Time"	Britney Spears	9/10 (4.49%)
Top 9 – Geschlechtertausch (14 March 2009)	"All Summer Long"	Kid Rock	7/9 (6.63%)
Top 8 – Party-Hits (21 March 2009)	"99 Luftballons"	Nena	4/8 (12.12%)
Top 7 – Sexy Hits (4 April 2009)	"Lady Marmalade"	Christina Aguilera, et al.	4/7 (15.72%)
Top 6 – Aktuelle Hits & I love you (11 April 2009)	"Just Dance"	Lady Gaga	2/6 (19.38%)
Top 6 – Aktuelle Hits & I love you (11 April 2009)	"Nobody Knows"	Pink	2/6 (19.38%)
Top 5 – Sonne und Regen (18 April 2009)	"Purple Rain"	Prince	2/5 (22.32%)
Top 5 – Sonne und Regen (18 April 2009)	"Bailando"	Loona	2/5 (22.32%)
Top 4 – Moviesongs & Unplugged (25 April 2009)	"There You'll Be"	Faith Hill	3/4 (23.08%)
Top 4 – Moviesongs & Unplugged (25 April 2009)	"Because of You"	Kelly Clarkson	3/4 (23.08%)
Top 3 – Uptempo, Power ballad & No.1 Hits (2 May 2009)	"Maneater"	Nelly Furtado	3/3 (19.98%)
Top 3 – Uptempo, Power ballad & No.1 Hits (2 May 2009)	"The Voice Within"	Christina Aguilera	3/3 (19.98%)
Top 3 – Uptempo, Power ballad & No.1 Hits (2 May 2009)	"My Life Would Suck Without You"	Kelly Clarkson	3/3 (19.98%)

=== Post-DSDS ===
Since June 2009, Eilfeld has acted in guest appearances on Germany's popular soap opera Gute Zeiten, schlechte Zeiten ("Good Times, Bad Times"). She has also been touring Germany with her band LaMie, which she founded in 2008.

On 1 September 2009, Eilfeld signed with German record label X-Cell Records and got a management contract with Artist Advice, company of producer George Glueck.

On 14 May 2010, Eilfeld released her single "Animal Instinct" under her new pseudonym "Annemie". The music video premiered on VIVA NEU and YouTube, where it was met with good reviews.

== Discography ==
=== Singles ===
List of singles, with selected chart positions, showing year released and album name
Title	Year	Peak chart positions		Album
Title	Year	GER	AUT	Album
"C the Light"	2004	—	—	non-album release
"Animal Instinct"	2010	22	74	non-album release
"Seele unter Eis"	2011	67	—	Großstadtprinzessin
"Santa Klaus vergiss mich nicht"	2012	—	—	non-album release
"Es geht vorbei"	2013	—	—	Barfuß durch Berlin
"—" denotes a title that did not chart, or was not released in that territory.

=== Albums ===
List of albums, with selected chart positions, showing year released
Year	Peak chart positions	
Year	GER	AUT
"Großstadtprinzessin"	—	—
"Barfuß durch Berlin"	—	—
"Neonlicht"	71	—
"Wahre Träumer"	—	—

=== Other songs ===
- 2004: "C the Light"
- 2009: "Moon and Sun"
