= Animal Instinct (Annemarie Eilfeld song) =

Single by Annemie
- B-side: "Animal Instinct (Scotty Clubmix)"
- Released: 14 May 2010
- Recorded: Germany
- Genre: Electropop, electrorock
- Length: 4:05
- Label: X-Cell Records, Universal, Interscope
- Songwriter(s): Annemarie Eilfeld, Rob Tyger, Kay Denar
- Producer(s): George Glueck

"Animal Instinct" is a song performed by former DSDS-contestant Annemarie Eilfeld under the pseudonym Annemie. It was the first single from her debut studio album "I'm Burning Up". It was produced and published by the German record company x-cell records and was released on 11 May 2010 in Germany as a digital download, and on 14 May 2010 as a 2-track CD single.

== Background and release ==
Eilfeld gained fame when she took part at German casting show Deutschland sucht den Superstar (DSDS), the German version of the Idol-franchise, in 2009. Though she made it to third place, she didn't want to get a contract with manager Volker Neumüller or producer Dieter Bohlen. Instead she decided to work on her music career on her own and signed to label x-cell records on 1 September that year. During the recording and producing of "Animal Instinct" she worked with Detlef D! Soost, a choreographer from the German edition of Popstars. The video of this song was released exclusively on tape.tv on 21 April 2010.

== Track listing ==
- 2-Track Single
1. "Animal Instinct" (Original Version) – 4:05
2. "Animal Instinct" (Scotty Clubmix) – 6:29
- German Download Single
1. "Animal Instinct" (Original Version) – 4:03
2. "Animal Instinct" (Scotty Clubmix) – 6:29
3. "Animal Instinct" (Andrew Spencer vs. Aquagen Remix) – 5:41
4. "Animal Instinct" (Extended Version) – 5:27

== Charts ==
Chart (2010)	Peak position
Germany (GfK)	22
