= Last Kiss Goodbye =

Studio album by Brian Tarquin
- Released: October 1997
- Recorded: April–May 1997
- Studio: Boogie Back Studios London, UK
- Genre: Jazz fusion, instrumental guitar
- Length: 61:00
- Label: Instinct
- Producer: Ernie McKone

Brian Tarquin chronology
Ghost Dance (1996)	Last Kiss Goodbye (1997)	Soft Touch (1999)

Singles from Last Kiss Goodbye
- 1. "One Arabian Knight, Freeway Jam, 57th Street, Crazy Horse"

Last Kiss Goodbye is the second studio solo album by guitarist Brian Tarquin, released in October 1997 with a new label Instinct records. Going in a more modern direction, Tarquin moved towards the more funky street grooves. Instinct sent him to London to record with Ernie McKone, bass player from the UK Acid Jazz band Galliano. This was the break through album for Tarquin, featuring the R&R/Gavin radio hit One Arabian Knight that charted #4 on the NAC/Smooth Jazz radio charts and the Jeff Beck remake Freeway Jam. The album has become a favorite at Smooth Jazz and still receives a generous amount of airplay today on Pandora Radio and Sirius radio.

== Critical reception ==
Last Kiss Goodbye received favorable reviews as JazzTimes wrote "Tarquin's delivery, though detailed, remains melodic and never ventures into the abstract. Although his acid jazz is a gentler breed of fusion, Tarquin plays with a fleet-fingered, smooth style, which floats across freewheeling pieces…" and Jazziz magazine wrote "Cosmopolitan flair is reminiscent of guitarist Lee Ritenour, with a tincture of Steely Dan."

== Track listing ==
No.	Title	Music	Length
1.	"Freeway Jam"	Max Middleton	4:42
2.	"57th Street"	Brian Tarquin, Chris Ingram, Pat Lavery	5:13
3.	"One Arabian Knight"	Tarquin, Ingram, Lavery	4:46
4.	"Crazy Horse"	Tarquin, Arden Hart	4:18
5.	"Trippin'"	Tarquin, Ingram, Lavery	4:04
6.	"Midnight Blue"	Tarquin, Ingram, Lavery	4:49
7.	"Third Stone From The Sun"	Jimi Hendrix	4:34
8.	"California Summer"	Tarquin, Hart	4:53
9.	"Uptown"	Ingram, Lavery	5:17
10.	"Summer Nights"	Tarquin, Hart	4:18
11.	"Geronimo"	Tarquin, Hart, Ingram, Lavery	4:25
12.	"Katrina"	Tarquin	4:40
13.	"Last Kiss Goodbye"	Tarquin	4:36
Total length:			61:00

== Personnel ==
- Brian Tarquin – guitars, guitar synthesizer
- Arden Hart – keyboard, trumpet
- Jim Carmichael – drums
- Crispen Robinson – percussion
- Crispen Taylor – drums
- Dan Lipman – saxophone
- James Hunt – saxophone
- Ernie McKone – bass, programming
- Chris Ingram – drum programming
- Jacko Peake – flute
- Ernie McKone – Engineer
- Michael Sarsfield at Frankford Wayne – Mastering Engineer
- Jimmy Cohrssen & Javier Chavez – photography
