= Phil Naro =

American singer-songwriter and guitarist (1958–2021)

Phillip Sampognaro (March 13, 1958 – May 3, 2021), known professionally as Phil Naro, was an American singer, songwriter, record producer, and guitarist. He was best known for his work with the hard rock bands Talas, Chain Reaction, and Coney Hatch. Naro was the vocalist for the 2009 Daytime Emmy Award–winning song featured in the television series 6teen.

He also performed with the Toronto-based band 24K, founded by drummer Rome Steeler. The group signed a two-record deal with Relativity Records in New York and collaborated with producer Eddie Kramer, known for his work with Kiss, Jimi Hendrix, and Led Zeppelin.

== Biography ==
=== Musical career ===
Naro began his singing career in the 1970s in high school bands. In 1979, he moved to Toronto to join the Canadian group Chain Reaction, with which he recorded the albums X-Rated Dream 1 and X-Rated Dream 2. When he returned to the United States, he joined the hard rock band Talas, led by bassist Billy Sheehan. When David Lee Roth left the Van Halen line-up in the mid-1980s and became a solo act, he hired Sheehan as his bassist for his band, leading to Naro leaving Talas. Naro then returned to Canada, where he became the lead singer of the band Coney Hatch, replacing James LaBrie, a vocalist who became popular for his work with the progressive metal group Dream Theater.

Producer Eddie Kramer contacted Naro in the early 1990s and invited him to become the lead singer of the new solo band of Peter Criss, the original drummer for Kiss. The songs "Blue Moon Over Brooklyn" and "Bad People" with Naro as singer were included on Criss Cat # 1 album. Since then, the musician has recorded a large number of collaborations and appearances with bands and artists such as Lee Aaron, John Rogers, DDrive, Druckfarben, and King Friday, in addition to recording some albums as a soloist.

In August 2020, Billy Sheehan reported that a new Talas studio album was in the works, and that it would feature Naro as the vocalist.

=== Health problems and death ===
Naro had to undergo surgery to remove a malignant tumor from his neck, diagnosed in 2013. After the procedure, the musician managed to control his disease through various alternative therapies. In 2020, he stated in an interview with IHeartRadio that he was again dealing with tongue cancer and that he was receiving chemotherapy treatment.

Naro died on May 3, 2021.
