= Gary Hoey =

American musician

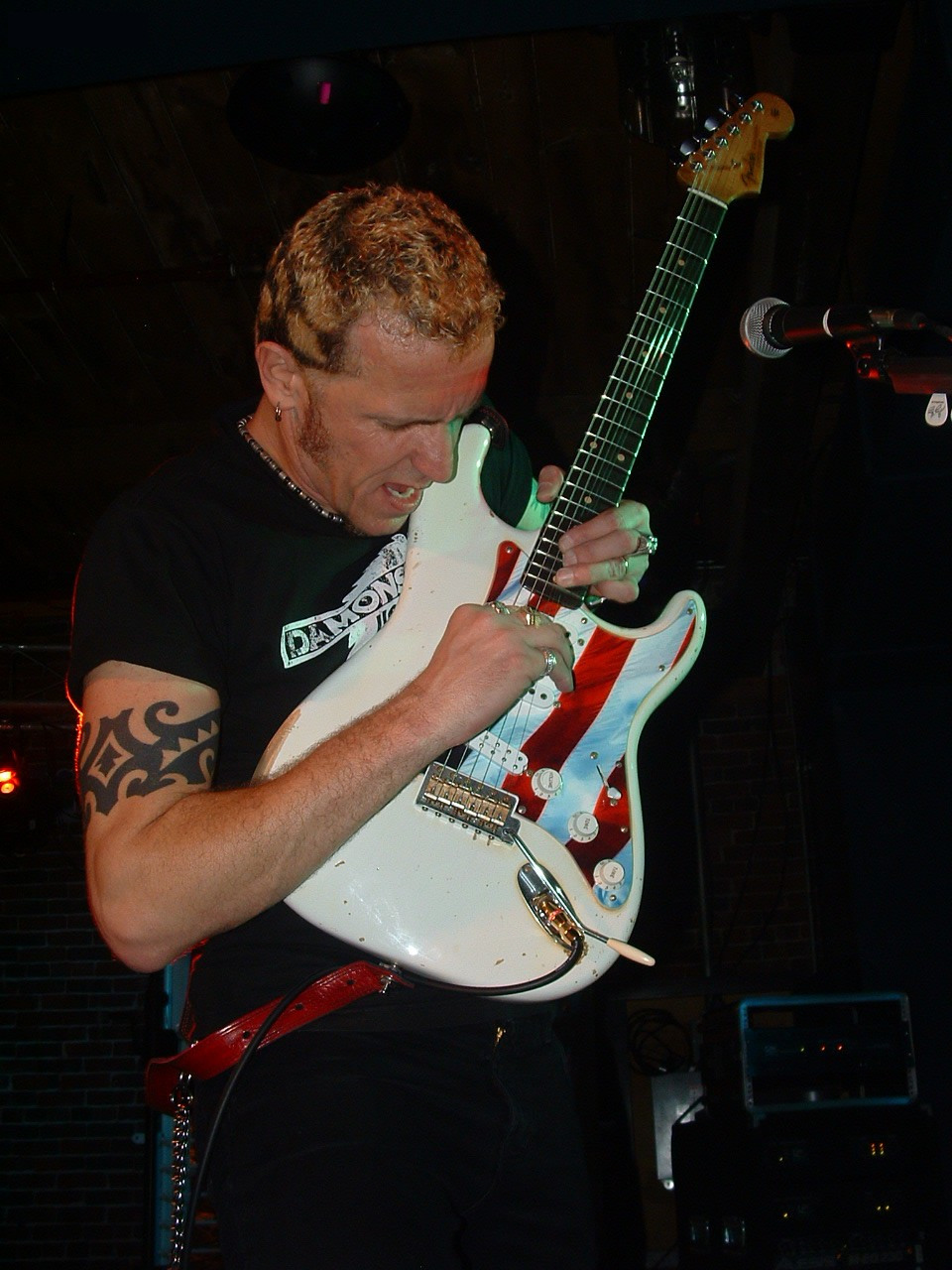

Background information
- Born: August 23, 1960 (age 65); Lowell, Massachusetts, U.S.
- Genres: Rock, hard rock, heavy metal, blues rock
- Occupations: Musician; Singer-songwriter
- Instrument: Guitar
- Years active: 1987–present
- Labels: Mascot Label Group Surfdog, Wazoo Music Group, Warner, Reprise
- Website: garyhoey.com

Gary Hoey (born August 23, 1960) is an American hard rock and latterly blues rock guitarist, singer and songwriter. He has recorded over 20 albums.

== Early life and early career ==
Hoey was born in Lowell, Massachusetts, United States. At fourteen, Hoey often lingered outside Boston's renowned Berklee College of Music, making friends and offering to pay for lessons. To devote his time to music, he dropped out of high school and began playing Boston's local clubs and teaching guitar to other young players. He auditioned for Ozzy Osbourne in 1987, when Osbourne was searching for a replacement for Jake E. Lee, but the job went to Zakk Wylde.

In 1990, he teamed with singer Joel Ellis, bassist Rex Tennyson, and drummer Frankie Banali to form Heavy Bones. The band released their debut album in 1992, but broke up shortly afterwards.

In 1993, he recorded the album Animal Instinct, which included a cover of the Focus hit "Hocus Pocus". The single reached the top five on the Billboard Mainstream Rock Tracks chart. Endless Summer II (1995) soundtrack soon followed.

== Later career ==
Hoey has toured and/or recorded with Brian May of Queen, Ted Nugent, Foreigner, Joe Satriani, The Doobie Brothers, Beth Hart, Kenny Wayne Shepherd, Eric Johnson, Steve Vai, Peter Frampton, Rick Derringer, and Lita Ford. Hoey supported Jeff Beck on the US leg of his Spring 2010 tour. Hoey played on and co-wrote a few songs on Lita Ford's Living Like a Runaway album in 2012, as well as toured with her in support of that album. His 2008 release Fade to Blues saw a shift in emphasis and style towards blues rock in his own work.

Hoey's most recent album, Neon Highway Blues was released in 2019. It debuted at number 2 in the US Billboard Blues Albums Chart.

== Discography ==
- Get A Grip (1991)
- Heavy Bones (with the band Heavy Bones) (1992)
- Animal Instinct (1993)
- Endless Summer II Soundtrack (1994)
- Gary Hoey (1995)
- Ho! Ho! Hoey (1995)
- Bug Alley (1996)
- Ho! Ho! Hoey II (1997)
- Hocus Pocus Live (1998)
- Money (1999)
- Ho! Ho! Hoey 3 (1999)
- Best Of Ho! Ho! Hoey (2001)
- Wake Up Call (2003)
- Ho! Ho! Hoey: The Complete Collection (2003)
- Best Of Gary Hoey (2004)
- Monster Surf (2005)
- The Official Album of the Disneyland Resort (2005) (California Screamin' [2001], with George Wilkins)
- American Made (2006)
- Fade to Blues (2008; re-released 2012)
- Utopia (2010)
- Deja Blues (2013)
- Dust & Bones (2016)
- Neon Highway Blues (2019)
- Avalanche (2025)
- Christmas Time Is Here (2025)
