= Will Ray =

American musician (born 1950)

Will Ray (born 1950) is an American session guitarist from Richmond, Virginia, and current member of the Hellecasters. Ray has also released a number of solo albums. He is considered an influential player of the Fender Telecaster line of guitars. Fender made two Will Ray signature models in the late 1990s: the Jazz-a-Caster and the Mojo-Tele. G&L sells a Will Ray signature model guitar and a less expensive version within their lower cost brand, Tribute by G&L.

In July 2005, Ray moved to North Carolina where he built a new state-of-the-art recording studio for production projects.

In September 2009, Ray began hosting a weekly music jam in Fletcher, North Carolina, at The Feed and Seed. The Tuesday night "Will Ray Mountain Jam" encourages local musicians, singer/songwriters to sign up and play with the house band (Will Ray and The Sons of Ralph).
