= List of film score composers =

The following is a list of notable people who compose or have composed soundtrack music for films (i.e. film scores), television, video games and radio.

== A ==
- Michael Abels (born 1962) – Get Out, Us, Bad Education
- Rod Abernethy – Star Trek: Encounters, Wheelman, Rage
- Amanda Abizaid (born 1974) – The 13th Alley
- J. J. Abrams (born 1966) – Felicity, Fringe
- André Abujamra (born 1965) – Durval Discos, Carandiru
- Bojan Adamič (1912–1995) – Valter Brani Sarajevo
- John Adams (born 1947) – Matter of Heart
- Lee Adams (born 1924)
- Barry Adamson (born 1958) – Lost Highway, Delusion
- Richard Addinsell (1904–1977) – Goodbye, Mr. Chips, Dangerous Moonlight, Beau Brummell
- John Addison (1920–1988) – Tom Jones, A Bridge Too Far
- Larry Adler (1914–2001) – Genevieve
- Mirwais Ahmadzaï (born 1960) – Die Another Day, Pardonnez-moi
- Air (formed 1995) – The Virgin Suicides
- Yasushi Akutagawa (1925–1989) – Gate of Hell, Fires on the Plain, Mount Hakkoda
- Ismo Alanko (born 1960) – Taivaan tulet, Remontti
- Mazhar Alanson (born 1950) – Everything's Gonna Be Great
- Damon Albarn (born 1968) – Ordinary Decent Criminal, Ravenous, 101 Reykjavík
- Charles Albertine (1929–1986)
- Bob Alcivar (1938–2025) – Butterflies Are Free, The Crazy World of Julius Vrooder, Hysterical
- Dan Andrei Aldea (1950–2020) – Nunta de piatră
- Edesio Alejandro (1958–2025) – Life Is to Whistle, Suite Habana, Un rey en la Habana
- Alessandro Alessandroni (1925–2017) – Any Gun Can Play
- Jeff Alexander (1910–1989) – The Tender Trap, Jailhouse Rock, Kid Galahad
- Van Alexander (1915–2015)
- Hugo Alfvén (1872–1960) – The Girl of Solbakken, Mans kvinna
- Hossein Alizadeh (born 1951) – Gabbeh, A Time for Drunken Horses, Turtles Can Fly
- Johan Alkenäs (born 1974)
- Eric Allaman
- Herb Alpert (born 1935) – Trabanten
- John Altman (born 1949) – The MatchMaker, Shadowlands, Little Voice
- Javier Álvarez (1956–2023) – Cronos
- William Alwyn (1905–1985) – The Fallen Idol, Odd Man Out, Fires Were Started
- Masamichi Amano (born 1957) – Battle Royale, Battle Royale II: Requiem, Giant Robo
- W. D. Amaradeva (1927–2016) – Adata Vediya Heta Hondai, Delovak Athara, Getawarayo, Sikuru Tharuwa
- Alejandro Amenábar (born 1972) – The Sea Inside, The Others
- Daniele Amfitheatrof (1901–1983) – Lassie Come Home, Song of the South, Guest Wife
- David Amram (born 1930) – The Manchurian Candidate, Splendor in the Grass
- Anamanaguchi (formed 2004) – Scott Pilgrim vs. the World: The Game
- Anand Raj Anand (born 1961) – Dishayen, Masti, Masoom
- Anastasia (formed 1990) – Before the Rain
- Kai Normann Andersen (1900–1967) – Præsten i Vejlby, Hotel Paradis, Odds 777, Nøddebo Præstegård
- Adam Anders (born 1975)
- Marisa Anderson – A Perfect Day for Caribou
- Murray C. Anderson – In My Country, Boy Called Twist
- Benny Andersson (born 1946) – Mio in the Land of Faraway, Songs from the Second Floor, You, the Living
- Michael Andrews (born 1959) – Donnie Darko, Orange County, Me and You and Everyone We Know, Walk Hard: The Dewey Cox Story
- Steffan Andrews (born 1985)
- Jurriaan Andriessen (1925–1996) – De aanslag, Dorp aan de rivier, De Dans van de Reiger
- George Antheil (1900–1959) – In a Lonely Place, Ballet Mécanique
- Paul Antonelli (born 1959) – China O'Brien, Out of the Dark
- Yoshino Aoki (born 1971) – Breath of Fire III, Breath of Fire IV
- Aphex Twin (born 1971) – Kuso
- Louis Applebaum (1918–2000) – The Story of G.I. Joe
- Arcade Fire (formed 2001) – Her
- Archive (formed 1994) – Michel Vaillant, Sep
- Takanori Arisawa (1951–2005) – Sailor Moon, Digimon
- David Arkenstone (born 1952) – Robot Wars, World of Warcraft: Cataclysm
- Harold Arlen (1905–1986) – The Wizard of Oz
- Craig Armstrong (born 1959) – Romeo + Juliet, Ray, Moulin Rouge!
- Leo Arnaud (1904–1991) – The Kissing Bandit, Apache Rose, The F.B.I.
- David Arnold (born 1962) – Independence Day, Quantum of Solace, Little Britain
- Sir Malcolm Arnold (1921–2006) – The Bridge on the River Kwai, Hobson's Choice, Whistle Down the Wind, The Belles of St Trinian's
- Len Arran (born 1961) – Soulboy, The Truth About Love
- Jorge Arriagada (1943–2024) – Time Regained, Klimt, Salvador Allende
- Claude Arrieu (1903–1990) – Les Gueux au paradis, Marchands de rien, The Heartthrob (Le Tombeur)
- Art Zoyd (formed 1968) – new scores for Nosferatu, Metropolis, Häxan
- Eduard Artemyev (1937–2022) – Solaris, Stalker, Burnt by the Sun, The Barber of Siberia
- Joseph Arthur (born 1971) – Hell's Kitchen, Deliver Us from Evil
- Philippe Arthuys (1928–2010) – The Glass Cage, The Carabineers, Le trou
- Noriyuki Asakura (born 1954) – Onimusha, Way of the Samurai, Tenchu
- Assassin (formed 1985) – La Haine
- Edwin Astley (1922–1998) – The Saint, Danger Man, Civilisation, The Adventures of Robin Hood
- Richard Attree – Horizon, The Demon Headmaster, Watt on Earth
- Georges Auric (1899–1983) – La Belle et la bete, Bonjour Tristesse, Lola Montès, The Wages of Fear, The Hunchback of Notre Dame
- Eric Avery (born 1965) – Sex with Strangers, Soul Kiss
- Max Avery Lichtenstein – Tarnation, Puzzlehead
- Roy Ayers (1940–2025) – Coffy
- Albert Ayler (1936–1970) – New York Eye and Ear Control
- Mark Ayres (born 1961) – Doctor Who
- Alexandre Azaria (born 1967) – Transporter 2, Transporter 3, Astérix et les Vikings
- Lex de Azevedo (born 1943) – The Swan Princess, Where the Red Fern Grows
- Charles Aznavour (1924–2018) – Le cercle vicieux, L'île du bout du monde, C'est pas moi, c'est l'autre

== B ==
- Luis Bacalov (1933–2017) – Django, Il Postino, The Gospel According to St. Matthew, Storm Rider
- Burt Bacharach (1928–2023) – Casino Royale, What's New Pussycat?, Butch Cassidy and the Sundance Kid, Lost Horizon
- Pierre Bachelet (1944–2005) – Emmanuelle, Les Bronzés font du ski, Story of O, Emmanuelle 5
- Michael Bacon (born 1949) – Loverboy, The Last Good Time, King Gimp
- Angelo Badalamenti (1937–2022) – Twin Peaks, Blue Velvet, The City of Lost Children, Mulholland Drive
- Klaus Badelt (born 1967) – Pirates of the Caribbean: The Curse of the Black Pearl, Equilibrium, Wu ji
- Paul Baillargeon (born 1944) – Star Trek: Deep Space Nine, Star Trek: Voyager, Star Trek: Enterprise
- Tadeusz Baird (1928–1981) – Lotna, Ludzie z pociagu, Pasazerka
- Constantin Bakaleinikoff (1896–1966) – Higher and Higher
- Mischa Bakaleinikoff (1890–1960) – Earth vs. the Flying Saucers, 20 Million Miles to Earth, It Came from Beneath the Sea
- Buddy Baker (1918–2002) – The Fox and the Hound, The Apple Dumpling Gang, Napoleon and Samantha
- Lorne Balfe (born 1976) (Composer, Producer, Arranger) Penguins of Madagascar, Home, The Lego Batman Movie
- Alexander Bălănescu (born 1954) – Tabló, Il partigiano Johnny, Dem Himmel ganz nah
- Iain Ballamy (born 1964) – MirrorMask
- Glen Ballard (born 1953) – Navy SEALs, The Polar Express, Clubland
- Richard Band (born 1953) – Re-Animator, Puppet Master, Stargate SG-1
- Thomas Bangalter (born 1975) – Irréversible
- Don Banks (1923–1980) – Die, Monster, Die!, The Reptile, Rasputin, the Mad Monk
- Claus Bantzer (born 1942) – Cherry Blossoms, Dragon Chow, Männer...
- Billy Barber
- Lesley Barber (born 1968) – You Can Count on Me, Mansfield Park, Little Bear
- Gato Barbieri (1934–2016) – Last Tango in Paris
- Blixa Bargeld (born 1959) – To Have & to Hold, Jonas in the Desert, Recycled
- James Edward Barker (born 1980) – Psych 9, The Drought, The Vanishment
- Warren Barker (1923–2006) – Bewitched
- Andrew Barnabas (born 1973) – MediEvil, Primal
- Erran Baron Cohen (born 1968) – Borat: Cultural Learnings of America for Make Benefit Glorious Nation of Kazakhstan, Brüno, Da Ali G Show
- Nathan Barr (born 1973) – Cabin Fever, Hostel, True Blood
- Alejandro Gutiérrez del Barrio (1895–1964) – Pachamama, Bendita seas, Los Peores del barrio
- Bebe Barron (1925–2008) – Forbidden Planet
- Louis Barron (1920–1989) – Forbidden Planet
- Jeff Barry (born 1938)
- John Barry (1933–2011) – Goldfinger, You Only Live Twice, Out of Africa, Midnight Cowboy
- Steve Bartek (born 1952) – Novocaine, Romy and Michele's High School Reunion, Desperate Housewives
- Dee Barton (1937–2001) – High Plains Drifter, Play Misty for Me, Thunderbolt and Lightfoot, Death Screams
- Stephen Barton (born 1982) – Call of Duty 4: Modern Warfare, The Six Wives of Henry Lefay
- Eef Barzelay (born 1970) – Rocket Science, Rudderless
- Jules Bass (1935–2022) – The Wacky World of Mother Goose, The Wind in the Willows
- George Bassman (1914–1997) – A Day at the Races, Middle of the Night, Producers' Showcase
- Tyler Bates (born 1965) – 300, Watchmen, Sucker Punch, The Devil's Rejects
- Hubert Bath (1883–1945) – Tudor Rose, A Yank at Oxford, Millions Like Us
- Mark Batson – Bad Boys II, Beauty Shop, War
- Mike Batt (born 1949) – Caravans, Watership Down, The Dreamstone, Keep the Aspidistra Flying
- Julián Bautista (1901–1961) – La Dama del millón, Café Cantante, La maestrita de los obreros
- Arnold Bax (1883–1953) – Oliver Twist, Malta, G. C.
- Les Baxter (1922–1996) – Wild in the Streets, Dr. Goldfoot and the Girl Bombs, The Dunwich Horror, Black Sunday
- Babak Bayat (1946–2006)
- Stephen Baysted (born 1969) – GTR 2 – FIA GT Racing Game, GT Legends
- Jeff Beal (born 1963) – Monk, Pollock
- John Beal (born 1947) – Vegas, The Funhouse, Eight Is Enough, Happy Days, Terror in the Aisles
- Robin Beanland (born 1968) – Conker's Bad Fur Day, Conker: Live and Reloaded
- Guy Béart (1930–2015) – Girl and the River, Manon des Sources, Une souris chez les hommes
- John Beasley (born 1960)
- Bobby Beausoleil (born 1947) – Lucifer Rising
- Giuseppe Becce (1877–1973) – The Cabinet of Dr. Caligari, Der letzte Mann, Tiefland
- Beck (born 1970) – Scott Pilgrim vs. the World
- Christophe Beck (born 1972) – Buffy the Vampire Slayer, Elektra, The Pink Panther, Waiting for "Superman"
- Jeff Beck (1944–2023) – Frankie's House
- David Bell (born 1954) – Star Trek: Enterprise, Murder, She Wrote
- Belle & Sebastian (formed 1996) – Storytelling
- Andrew Belling – Wizards, Starchaser: The Legend of Orin, Hangar 18
- Roger Bellon
- Marco Beltrami (born 1966) – Scream, The Hurt Locker, I, Robot, 3:10 to Yuma
- Arthur Benjamin (1893–1960) – The Man Who Knew Too Much, An Ideal Husband, Above Us the Waves, Fire Down Below
- Richard Rodney Bennett (1936–2012) – Murder on the Orient Express, Far from the Madding Crowd, Four Weddings and a Funeral
- Alan and Marilyn Bergman (1925–2025 and 1929–2022)
- David Bergeaud (born 1968) – Prince Valiant, Ratchet & Clank, The Outer Limits
- Irving Berlin (1888–1989) – Top Hat, Holiday Inn, Easter Parade
- James Bernard (1925–2001) – Horror of Dracula, Taste the Blood of Dracula, The Devil Rides Out, The Curse of Frankenstein
- Charles Bernstein (born 1943) – A Nightmare on Elm Street, Cujo, White Lightning
- Elmer Bernstein (1922–2004) – The Ten Commandments, The Magnificent Seven, To Kill a Mockingbird, Far from Heaven
- Leonard Bernstein (1918–1990) – On the Waterfront, West Side Story
- Peter Bernstein (born 1961)
- Adam Berry (born 1966) – South Park, Balto II: Wolf Quest, Kim Possible
- The Besnard Lakes (formed 2003) – Sympathy for Delicious
- Peter Best (born 1943) – "Crocodile" Dundee, Doing Time for Patsy Cline, The Adventures of Barry McKenzie
- Henri Betti (1917–2005) – His Father's Portrait
- Harry Betts (1922–2012) – Black Mama, White Mama, The Fantastic Plastic Machine
- Vishal Bhardwaj (born 1960) – The Blue Umbrella, Omkara, Godmother
- Amin Bhatia (born 1961) – Iron Eagle II, Queer as Folk, The Zack Files
- Vanraj Bhatia (1927–2021) – Jaya Ganga, Ankur, Manthan, Junoon
- Christian Biegai (born 1974) – Eagle vs Shark, Whistle
- Biosphere (born 1962) – Eternal Stars, Insomnia, Man with a Movie Camera
- Magnus Birgersson – Mirror's Edge
- Joseph Bishara (born 1970) – 11–11–11, The Conjuring, Dark Skies, Insidious
- Anil Biswas (1914–2003) – Kismet, Aurat, Journey Beyond Three Seas
- Bruno Bizarro (born 1979) – A Vida Privada de Salazar, O Último Tesouro, Substantia
- Ragnar Bjerkreim (born 1958) – Kamilla and the Thief
- Björk (born 1965) – Dancer in the Dark, Drawing Restraint 9
- Bleeding Fingers Music
- Stanley Black (1913–2002) – Laughter in Paradise, Summer Holiday, The Young Ones
- Richard Blackford (born 1954) – House of Harmony, The Shell Seekers
- Howard Blake (born 1938) – The Bear, The Duellists, Flash Gordon, The Snowman
- Art Blakey (1919–1990) – Des femmes disparaissent, Man Outside, Stop Driving Us Crazy
- Terence Blanchard (born 1962) – Inside Man, Malcolm X, Clockers, Sugar Hill
- Jamie Blanks (born 1971) – Storm Warning, Long Weekend
- Teddy Blass (born 1984) – Byoukimon, Chain Shooter, Fortune's Prime
- Erik Blicker (born 1964)
- Arthur Bliss (1891–1975) – Things to Come, Men of Two Worlds, Seven Waves Away
- Blue Öyster Cult (formed 1967) – Bad Channels
- Len Blum (born 1951) – East End Hustle
- Armando Bó (1914–1981) – Fuego, Una Mariposa en la noche, La Leona
- Wes Boatman – Guiding Light, The Banger Sisters, As the World Turns
- Michael Boddicker (born 1953) – The Adventures of Buckaroo Banzai Across the 8th Dimension, White Water Summer, The Adventures of Milo and Otis
- Todd Boekelheide (born 1954) – 3 1/2 Minutes, 10 Bullets, Ballets Russes
- Ed Bogas (born 1942) – Fritz the Cat, Heavy Traffic, Bon Voyage, Charlie Brown (and Don't Come Back!!)
- Claude Bolling (1930–2020) – Borsalino, California Suite, Daisy Town
- Bertrand Bonello (born 1968) – The Pornographer, De la guerre, House of Tolerance
- Bernardo Bonezzi (1964–2012) – Law of Desire, Women on the Verge of a Nervous Breakdown, Nobody Will Speak of Us When We're Dead
- Luiz Bonfá (1922–2001) – Black Orpheus
- Fred Bongusto (1935–2019) – Malicious, Fantozzi contro tutti, Superfantozzi
- Raichand Boral (1903–1982) – Mahobbat Ke Aansu, Dhoop Chhaon, Swami Vivekanand
- Simon Boswell (born 1956) – Santa Sangre, Dust Devil, Tin Man
- Perry Botkin Jr. (1933–2021) – Skyjacked, Tarzan, the Ape Man
- Martin Böttcher (1927–2019) – Winnetou, Derrick, Das schwarze Schaf
- Frédéric Botton (1937–2008) – Hunting and Gathering
- Roddy Bottum (born 1963) – Adam & Steve, What Goes Up, Kabluey
- Ned Bouhalassa (born 1962) – Fries with That?, 15/Love
- Pierre Boulez (1925–2016) – La symphonie mécanique, Le Soleil des eaux
- Pieter Bourke – The Insider, Ali
- David Bowie (1947–2016) – Labyrinth, The Buddha of Suburbia, Omikron: The Nomad Soul
- Euel Box (1928–2017) – Benji, For the Love of Benji, Oh! Heavenly Dog
- Boyce and Hart (1939–1994 and 1939–2025)
- Scott Bradley (1891–1977) – Tom and Jerry, Droopy, Barney Bear, Screwy Squirrel, George and Junior
- Steven Bramson – The Young Indiana Jones Chronicles, NCIS, The Nine
- Glenn Branca (1948–2018) – The Belly of an Architect
- Otto Brandenburg (1934–2007) – Villa Vennely
- Angelo Branduardi (born 1950) – Momo
- Stephen Bray (born 1956) – Who's That Girl, Psycho III
- Buddy Bregman (1930–2017) – The Delicate Delinquent, Five Guns West, Guns, Girls, and Gangsters
- Goran Bregović (born 1950) – Time of the Gypsies, Underground
- Joseph Carl Breil (1870–1926) – The Birth of a Nation, Les Amours de la reine Élisabeth
- Willem Breuker (1944–2010) – De illusionist, De IJssalon, Het teken van het beest
- Philip Brigham (born 1952) – Road to Salina, The Adventures of Pete & Pete
- Jon Brion (born 1963) – Magnolia, Punch-Drunk Love, Eternal Sunshine of the Spotless Mind
- Benjamin Britten (1913–1976) – Night Mail
- Jeff Britting (born 1957) – Ayn Rand: A Sense of Life
- Broadcast (formed 1995) – Berberian Sound Studio
- Timothy Brock (born 1963) – new music for silent films Sunrise: A Song of Two Humans, Faust', Berlin: Symphony of a Metropolis
- Michael Brook (born 1951) – An Inconvenient Truth, Into the Wild
- Eric Brosius – System Shock 2, Thief: The Dark Project, Guitar Hero
- Dirk Brossé (born 1960) – Daens, When the Light Comes, A Peasant's Psalm
- Bruce Broughton (born 1945) – Silverado, Lost in Space, Young Sherlock Holmes
- Leo Brouwer (born 1939) – Like Water for Chocolate, La última cena, CSI: NY
- Russell Brower – World of Warcraft: Wrath of the Lich King, Joint Operations: Typhoon Rising, Diablo III
- Bill Brown (born 1969) – Tom Clancy's Rainbow Six, Return to Castle Wolfenstein, CSI: NY
- Dennis C. Brown – Dharma & Greg
- James Brown (1933–2006) – Black Caesar, Slaughter's Big Rip-Off
- Larry Brown (born 1947)
- Dave Brubeck (1920–2012) – Mr. Broadway, This Is America, Charlie Brown, Ordeal by Innocence
- George Bruns (1914–1983) – Sleeping Beauty, The Jungle Book, Robin Hood
- Joanna Bruzdowicz (1943–2021) – Vagabond, Jacquot de Nantes
- Gavin Bryars (born 1943) – A Song of Love, Central Bazaar, Smert v Pensne ili nash Chekhov
- BT (born 1971) – Go, The Fast and the Furious, Monster, Stealth
- Chico Buarque (born 1944) – Garota De Ipanema, Dona Flor e Seus Dois Maridos, Os Saltimbancos Trapalhões
- David Buckley (born 1976) – Blood Creek, The Forbidden Kingdom, From Paris with Love
- Paul Buckmaster (1946–2017) – 12 Monkeys, Son of Dracula, Out-of-Sync, Most Wanted, The Rainbow Warrior
- Harold Budd (1936–2020) – Mysterious Skin
- Roy Budd (1947–1993) – Get Carter, Zeppelin, The Carey Treatment, The Sea Wolves, Who Dares Wins
- Peter Buffett (born 1958) – The Tillamook Treasure, For the Next 7 Generations, Sky Dancers
- Bun Bun – Breath of Fire, Metal Slug 1st Mission, Mega Man 3
- Roman Bunka (1951–2022) – Paul Bowles – Halbmond, ¿Bin ich schön?
- Velton Ray Bunch (born 1948) – Magnum, P.I., JAG, Nash Bridges
- Geoffrey Burgon (1941–2010) – Brideshead Revisited, Monty Python's Life of Brian, The Chronicles of Narnia
- Rahul Dev Burman (1939–1994) – Teesri Manzil, Padosan, Baharon Ke Sapne
- Sachin Dev Burman (1906–1975) – Baazi, Shabnam, Pyaasa
- J. J. Burnel (born 1952) – Gankutsuou: The Count of Monte Cristo
- Justin Burnett (born 1973) – SOCOM U.S. Navy SEALs: Confrontation, SOCOM U.S. Navy SEALs: Fireteam Bravo 2, Syphon Filter: Logan's Shadow
- T Bone Burnett (born 1948) – O Brother, Where Art Thou?, Walk the Line, Don't Come Knocking
- Jeff & Greg Burns (born 1969)
- Ralph Burns (1922–2001) – Lenny, All That Jazz, Star 80
- Carter Burwell (born 1954) – Fargo, Being John Malkovich, Blood Simple, True Grit, Miller's Crossing
- David Buttolph (1902–1982) – Maverick, Kiss of Death, The Virginian
- Joseph Byrd (1937–2025) – Lions Love, Health, The Ghost Dance
- David Byrne (born 1952) – The Last Emperor, Young Adam, Big Love

== C ==
- John Cacavas (1930–2014) – Kojak, Horror Express, The Bionic Woman
- John Cage (1912–1992) – Dreams That Money Can Buy, Works of Calder
- Peter Calandra – Jellysmoke, Unknown Soldier
- John Cale (born 1942) – American Psycho, I Shot Andy Warhol, A Burning Hot Summer
- Charles Calello (born 1938)
- Cali (born 1968) – J'ai oublié de te dire
- Sean Callery (born 1964) – 24, Homeland, La Femme Nikita
- Gérard Calvi (1922–2015) – Asterix the Gaul, Asterix and Cleopatra, The Twelve Tasks of Asterix
- Pino Calvi (1930–1989) – Senza Rete
- Pedro Macedo Camacho (born 1979) – Audiosurf, A Vampyre Story, Star Citizen
- Francisco Canaro (1888–1964) – He nacido en Buenos Aires, Explosivo 008, Con la música en el alma
- Bruno Canfora (1924–2017) – The Man Who Wagged His Tail, It Happened in Broad Daylight
- Paul Cantelon (born 1959) – The Diving Bell and the Butterfly, W., The Other Boleyn Girl
- Claudio Capponi (born 1959) – Jane Eyre, My House in Umbria
- Al Capps (1938–2018)
- Xhol Caravan (1967–1972) – Das Unheil, Wir – zwei
- David Carbonara – Mad Men, Fast Food Fast Women, The Guru
- Gerard Carbonara (1886–1959) – The Kansan, Stagecoach
- Sam Cardon – The Work and the Glory, Mystic India
- Wendy Carlos (born 1939) – A Clockwork Orange, Tron, The Shining
- Larry Carlton (born 1948) – Hill Street Blues, Against All Odds
- John Carpenter (born 1948) – Halloween, The Fog, Escape from New York
- Pete Carpenter (1914–1987) – Bewitched, Gomer Pyle, U.S.M.C., The Andy Griffith Show
- Joey Carbone
- Hans Carste (1909–1971) – Tagesschau, Im schwarzen Rößl, Spring in Berlin
- Benny Carter (1907–2003) – A Man Called Adam, Buck and the Preacher, The Alfred Hitchcock Hour
- Gaylord Carter (1905–2000) – Little Lord Fauntleroy, Directed by John Ford
- Kristopher Carter (born 1972) – Batman Beyond, Batman: The Brave and the Bold, Young Justice
- Doreen Carwithen (1922–2003) – Harvest from the Wilderness, Boys in Brown, Mantrap
- Tristram Cary (1925–2008) – The Ladykillers, Quatermass and The Pit, The Boy Who Stole a Million
- Johnny Cash (1932–2003) – I Walk the Line, Little Fauss and Big Halsey
- Ronald Cass (1923–2006) – Summer Holiday, The Young Ones
- Patrick Cassidy (born 1956)
- Teddy Castellucci (born 1965) – The Wedding Singer, Big Daddy, Little Nicky
- Mario Castelnuovo-Tedesco (1895–1968) – The Loves of Carmen, Time Out of Mind
- Nick Cave (born 1957) – Ghosts... of the Civil Dead, The Assassination of Jesse James by the Coward Robert, The Road
- Ryan Cayabyab (born 1954) – Kahapon, May Dalawang Bata, Misis Mo, Misis Ko, Azucena
- Chakri (born 1974) – Satyam, Chukkallo Chandrudu, Jai Bolo Telangana
- Frankie Chan (born 1955) – The Prodigal Son, Chungking Express, Fallen Angels
- Chan Kwong-wing (born 1967) – Infernal Affairs, The Warlords, The Storm Riders
- François-Eudes Chanfrault (born 1974) – Haute Tension, Inside, Donkey Punch
- Gary Chang (born 1953) – Eerie, Indiana, Under Siege, Sniper, The Island of Dr. Moreau
- Charlie Chaplin (1889–1977) – Modern Times, Limelight, City Lights, The Gold Rush, A Countess from Hong Kong
- Benoît Charest (born 1964) – The Triplets of Belleville, Adam's Wall, Polytechnique
- John Charles (1940–2024) – Utu, The Quiet Earth, Spooked
- Ken Chastain (born 1964) – M@d About, Invention
- Stuart Chatwood (born 1969) – Prince of Persia: The Sands of Time, Prince of Persia: Warrior Within, Prince of Persia: The Two Thrones
- Jay Chattaway (born 1946) – Maniac, Missing in Action, Star Trek: The Next Generation
- Matthieu Chedid (born 1971) – Tell No One, Un monstre à Paris
- Yekaterina Chemberdzhi (born 1960) – Woman Driving, Man Sleeping
- The Chemical Brothers (formed 1991) – Hanna
- Yury Chernavsky (1947–2025) – Investigation Held by Kolobki, Sezon chudes, Vyshe radugi
- Don Cherry (1936–1995) – The Holy Mountain
- Paul Chihara (born 1938) – Death Race 2000, The Bad News Bears Go to Japan, The Darker Side of Terror
- Ghulam Ahmed Chishti (1905–1994) – Sohni Mahival, Deen-o-Dunya, Shukriya
- Chitragupta (1917–1991) – Bhabi, Ganga Maiyya Tohe Piyari Chadhaibo, Oonche Log, Sansar
- Salil Chowdhury (1922–1995) – Do Bigha Zamin, Chhoti Si Baat, Doorathu Idhi Muzhakkam
- Sandeep Chowta – Ninne Pelladutha, Shanti Shanti Shanti, Kaun
- Jamie Christopherson – Onimusha: Dawn of Dreams, Bionic Commando, Lost Planet
- Toby Chu (born 1977) – The Riches, Covert Affairs, Domino
- Frank Churchill (1901–1942) – Bambi, Snow White and the Seven Dwarfs, Dumbo
- Keefus Ciancia (born 1972) – The Poughkeepsie Tapes, Saving Grace, Diana
- Suzanne Ciani (born 1946) – The Incredible Shrinking Woman, Rainbow's Children, One Life to Live
- Alessandro Cicognini (1906–1995) – Umberto D., The Last Judgement, It Started in Naples
- Grzegorz Ciechowski (1957–2001) – The Hexer, Schloß Pompon Rouge, Stan Strachu
- Simone Cilio (born 1992)
- The Cinematic Orchestra (formed 1997) – The Crimson Wing: Mystery of the Flamingos, new score for Man with a Movie Camera
- Stelvio Cipriani (1937–2018) – The Anonymous Venetian, Concorde Affaire '79, Twitch of the Death Nerve
- Julien Civange – Roberto Succo, Looking for Jimmy, Choses secrètes
- Dolores Claman (1927–2021) – Hockey Night in Canada, The Man Who Wanted to Live Forever, Captain Apache
- Clannad (formed 1970) – Robin of Sherwood, The Angel and the Soldier Boy, The Natural World: Atlantic Realm
- James Kenelm Clarke (1941–2020) – All These People, About Anglia, Got It Made
- Malcolm Clarke (1943–2003) – Earthshock, The Sea Devils
- Stanley Clarke (born 1951) – The Transporter, A Man Called Hawk, Soul Food: The Series
- Alf Clausen (1941–2025) – The Simpsons, Moonlighting, ALF
- Climax Golden Twins (formed 1993) – Session 9, The Mangler Reborn, The Dark Chronicles, Chained
- George S. Clinton (born 1947) – Austin Powers, The Astronaut's Wife, Wild Things, Mortal Kombat
- Charlie Clouser (born 1963) – Saw, NUMB3RS, The Stepfather, Resident Evil: Extinction
- Elia Cmiral (born 1950) – Ronin, Nash Bridges, Atlas Shrugged: Part I
- Eric Coates (1886–1957) – The Dam Busters, The Selfish Giant, The Three Bears
- Bob Cobert (1924–2020) – Dark Shadows, The Night Stalker, Burnt Offerings, Scalpel, The Winds of War
- John Coda
- Harvey Cohen (1951–2007)
- Coil (formed 1982) – The Angelic Conversation, Blue, Gay Man's Guide to Safer Sex
- Ozan Çolakoğlu (born 1972) – G.O.R.A., Organize İşler, Sınav
- Ray Colcord (1949–2016) – 227, The Devonsville Terror
- Jude Cole (born 1960) – Truth or Consequences, N.M., Last Light, Woman Wanted
- Cy Coleman (1929–2004) – Playboy After Dark
- Lisa Coleman (born 1960) – Crossing Jordan, Heroes, Dangerous Minds
- Cyril Collard (1957–1993) – Savage Nights
- Anthony Vincent Collins (1893–1963) – Swiss Family Robinson, I Live in Grosvenor Square, Trent's Last Case
- Phil Collins (born 1951) – Tarzan, Brother Bear
- Michel Colombier (1939–2004) – The Golden Child, Une chambre en ville, Against All Odds
- Juan J. Colomer (born 1966) – A Day Without a Mexican, A Letter to Rachel, Dark Honeymoon
- Zebedy Colt (1929–2004) – The Story of Joanna, Manhole
- Peter Connelly (born 1972) – Tomb Raider: The Angel of Darkness, Flesh Feast, Mass Destruction
- Carol Connors (born 1941)
- Con Conrad (1891–1938) – The Gay Divorcee, Here's to Romance, Palmy Days
- Marius Constant (1925–2004) – The Twilight Zone, Le chemin de Damas, Tomorrow's World
- Paul Constantinescu (1909–1963) – O noapte furtunoasa, Rasuna valea, La 'Moara cu noroc'
- Bill Conti (born 1942) – Rocky, The Right Stuff, The Karate Kid
- Ry Cooder (born 1947) – Johnny Handsome, Paris, Texas, Crossroads
- Jason Cooper (born 1967) – From Within, Without Gorky
- Ray Cooper (born 1945) – Fear and Loathing in Las Vegas
- Stewart Copeland (born 1952) – Talk Radio, Wall Street, Highlander II: The Quickening
- Aaron Copland (1900–1990) – Of Mice and Men, The North Star, The Heiress
- Cecil Copping (1888–1966) – The Lost World, The Private Life of Helen of Troy, The Love Racket
- Carmine Coppola (1910–1991)
- Normand Corbeil (1956–2013) – Frankenstein
- Michael Corcoran (born 1972)
- Frank Cordell (1928–1980) – The Rebel, Ring of Bright Water, God Told Me To
- John Corigliano (born 1938) – Altered States, Revolution, The Red Violin
- Bruno Coulais (born 1954) – The Crimson Rivers, The Chorus, Coraline
- Vladimir Cosma (born 1940) – The Mad Adventures of Rabbi Jacob, La boum, Diva
- Alec R. Costandinos (born 1944) – Trocadéro bleu citron, Caravane, Les derniers jours de la victime
- Alexander Courage (1919–2008) – Star Trek: The Original Series, The Left Handed Gun, Day of the Outlaw
- Crush 40 (formed 1997) – Sonic Adventure, Shadow the Hedgehog, Sonic Heroes
- The Crystal Method (formed 1993) – N2O: Nitrous Oxide, London, X Games 3D: The Movie
- Douglas J. Cuomo (born 1958) – Homicide: Life on the Street, Sex and the City, Crazy Love
- Mike Curb (born 1944) – Skaterdater, The Wild Angels, The Born Losers
- Joseph Curiale (born 1955)
- Hoyt Curtin (1922–2000) – The Flintstones, Jonny Quest, The Jetsons
- Leah Curtis – Exitus Roma, To Rest in Peace

== D ==
- John D'Andrea
- Juan d'Arienzo (1900–1976) – Melodías porteñas, Gente bien
- Dan the Automator (born 1966) – SSX 3 Omakasse, Clarrysney
- Daft Punk (formed 1993) – Tron: Legacy
- Ben Daglish (born 1966) – Gauntlet, Deflektor, The Last Ninja
- V. Dakshinamoorthy (1919–2013) – Nalla Thanka, Mizhikal Sakshi, Navalokam
- Burkhard Dallwitz (born 1959) – The Truman Show, CrashBurn, The Way Back
- Đặng Hữu Phúc (born 1953) – Thời xa vắng, Mùa ổi, Gate, gate, paragate
- Britt Daniel (born 1971) – Stranger than Fiction
- John Dankworth (1927–2010) – Saturday Night and Sunday Morning, Modesty Blaise, Tomorrow's World
- Jeff Danna (born 1964) – The Boondock Saints, O, Resident Evil: Apocalypse
- Mychael Danna (born 1958) – 8mm, The Ice Storm, Monsoon Wedding
- Danny! (born 1983)
- Ken Darby (1909–1992) – Rancho Notorious, Meet Me After the Show, The Adventures of Jim Bowie
- Mason Daring (born 1949) – Return of the Secaucus 7, The Brother from Another Planet, Eight Men Out
- David Darling (1941–2021) – Into the Deep: America, Whaling & the World, Kedma, Going Under
- Samar Das (1929–2001) – Mukh O Mukhosh, Asiya, Dhirey Bahey Meghna
- Peter Dasent – Meet the Feebles, Braindead, Heavenly Creatures
- Vladimir Dashkevich (born 1934) – Sherlock Holmes and Dr. Watson, Niotkuda s lyubovyu, ili Vesyolye pokhorony, Prodleniye roda
- Evelyne Datl – The Adventures of Dudley the Dragon, The Big Comfy Couch, What's for Dinner?
- Gerhard Daum (born 1956) Felon
- Shaun Davey (born 1948) – Waking Ned, The Tailor of Panama, The Abduction Club
- Iva Davies (born 1955) – Razorback, Master and Commander: The Far Side of the World, The Incredible Journey of Mary Bryant
- Peter Maxwell Davies (1934–2016) – The Devils, The Boy Friend
- Carl Davis (1936–2023) – The French Lieutenant's Woman, new music for Intolerance
- Don Davis (born 1957) – The Matrix, House on Haunted Hill, Behind Enemy Lines
- Jonathan Davis (born 1971) – Queen of the Damned
- Miles Davis (1926–1991) – Elevator to the Gallows, Siesta, Dingo
- Guido De Angelis (born 1944) – Yor, the Hunter from the Future, Sandokan, Watch Out, We're Mad!
- Maurizio De Angelis (born 1947) – Yor, the Hunter from the Future, Sandokan, Watch Out, We're Mad!
- Mark De Gli Antoni – Cherish, Marie and Bruce, Into the Abyss
- Francesco De Masi (1930–2005) – Arizona Colt, Private Vices, Public Pleasures, The New York Ripper
- Tullio De Piscopo (born 1946) – L'arma, I guappi non si toccano, 32 dicembre
- Frank De Vol (1911–1999) – Hush... Hush, Sweet Charlotte, The Flight of the Phoenix, What Ever Happened to Baby Jane?
- Barry De Vorzon (born 1934) – Dillinger, The Warriors, Xanadu, S.W.A.T.
- Dan Deacon (born 1981) – Twixt, Hilvarenbeek
- Dead Can Dance (formed 1981) – Moon Child, In the Presence of Mine Enemies, Ruth's Journey
- Dick DeBenedictis (born 1937) – Perry Mason, Police Story, Columbo
- John Debney (born 1956) – Jetsons: The Movie, Cutthroat Island, The Emperor's New Groove, Jimmy Neutron: Boy Genius, The Passion of the Christ, Chicken Little, The Ant Bully, Barnyard, Everyone's Hero, Iron Man 2, The SpongeBob Movie: Sponge Out of Water and Search for SquarePants, Ice Age: Collision Course, Luck, Under the Boardwalk, The Garfield Movie, In Your Dreams
- Charles Deenen (born 1970) – Double Dragon, Xain'd Sleena, Zamzara
- Deep Forest (formed 1992) – Strange Days, Le prince du Pacifique, Kusa no ran
- Jack Delano (1914–1997) – Los Peloteros
- Georges Delerue (1925–1992) – Hiroshima mon amour, Jules and Jim, Contempt, The Last Metro
- Jaime Delgado Aparicio (1943–1983) – El embajador y yo
- Joe Delia (born 1948) – Bad Lieutenant, King of New York, Dangerous Game
- Norman Dello Joio (1913–2008) – Air Power, The Smashing of the Reich, A Golden Prison: The Louvre
- Julie Delpy (born 1969) – J'ai peur, j'ai mal, je meurs, 2 Days in Paris, The Countess
- Milton DeLugg (1918–2015) – Santa Claus Conquers the Martians, The Gong Show, Treasure Hunt
- Éric Demarsan (born 1938) – Army of Shadows, Le Cercle rouge, Les Spécialistes
- Eumir Deodato (born 1943) – Bossa Nova
- Olivier Deriviere (born 1978) – Alone in the Dark, Obscure, Phileas Fortune
- Jean Derome (born 1955) – Passiflora, When I Will Be Gone (L'Âge de braise), De ma fenêtre, sans maison...
- Russ DeSalvo – Barbie Diaries
- Alexandre Desplat (born 1961) – The Painted Veil, The King's Speech, Girl with a Pearl Earring, Lust, Caution
- Paul Dessau (1894–1979) – Alice und ihre Feuerwehr, Stürme über dem Mont Blanc, Taras Bulba
- Adolph Deutsch (1897–1980) – The Maltese Falcon, Some Like It Hot, The Apartment
- Stephen Deutsch (born 1945) – The Signalman, The History of Mr. Polly, Bye Bye Columbus
- Deva (born 1950) – Aasai, Kushi, The Prince
- Srikanth Deva – Kuthu, Puli Varudhu, Aattanayagann
- DeVotchKa (formed 1997) – Little Miss Sunshine
- Keegan DeWitt (born 1982) – I'll See You in My Dreams, Queen of Earth, Inocente
- Frédéric Devreese (1929–2020) – Het Sacrament, Du bout des lèvres, La partie d'échecs
- Sussan Deyhim (born 1958) – ''Turbulent, Rapture, Mahdokht
- James Di Pasquale (born 1941) – McClain's Law, Armed and Dangerous, Rad
- Neil Diamond (born 1941) – Jonathan Livingston Seagull, The Jazz Singer
- Michelle DiBucci (born 1961) – Wendigo, Creepshow, Carrier
- Vince DiCola (born 1957) – The Transformers: The Movie, Staying Alive, Rocky IV
- Enrique Santos Discépolo (1901–1951) – Melodías porteñas, La vida es un tango, En la luz de una estrella
- Ramin Djawadi (born 1974) – Prison Break, Iron Man, Game of Thrones
- Lucia Dlugoszewski (1931–2000) – Guns of the Trees, Visual Variations on Noguchi
- Dave Dobbyn (born 1957)
- Julius Dobos (born 1976) – Europe Express, Thend, Black Strawberries
- Robert E. Dolan (1908–1972) – Once Upon a Honeymoon, The Great Gatsby, The Man Who Understood Women
- Thomas Dolby (born 1958) – Howard the Duck, Gothic, The Gate to the Mind's Eye
- Klaus Doldinger (1936–2025) – Das Boot, The NeverEnding Story, Negresco – Eine tödliche Affäre
- Pino Donaggio (born 1941) – Don't Look Now, Carrie, Dressed to Kill
- Walter Donaldson (1893–1947) – Glorifying the American Girl, The Great Ziegfeld, Panama Hattie
- James Dooley (born 1976) – When a Stranger Calls, SOCOM U.S. Navy SEALs: Combined Assault, Infamous
- Steve Dorff (born 1949) – Spenser: For Hire, Murphy Brown, Just the Ten of Us
- Pierre van Dormael (1952–2008) – Toto the Hero, The Eighth Day, Mr. Nobody
- Paul Doucette (born 1972) – Shredderman Rules, Just Pray
- Joel Douek – Shark Week, Discovery Atlas, The Wildest Dream
- Patrick Doyle (born 1953) – Henry V, Hamlet, Sense and Sensibility, Frankenstein
- Carmen Dragon (1914–1984) – At Gunpoint, Night into Tomorrow, Invasion of the Body Snatchers
- Christopher Drake – Hellboy: Sword of Storms, Batman: Gotham Knight, Justice League: Doom
- Robert Drasnin (1927–2015) – Joe Forrester, CHiPs, Cinemania
- Jojo Draven – Hell Asylum, Witches of the Caribbean, Ghost Month
- Dennis Dreith (born 1948) – Purple People Eater, The Punisher, Gag
- Mark Dresser (born 1952) – new music for the silent films The Cabinet of Dr. Caligari, Un Chien Andalou
- Jorge Drexler (born 1964) – Retrato de mujer con hombre al fondo, Hermanas, The City of Your Final Destination
- George Dreyfus (born 1928) – A Steam Train Passes, Rush, The Fringe Dwellers
- Howard Drossin (born 1970) – Tom-Yum-Goong, The Man with the Iron Fists, Splatterhouse
- Jack Curtis Dubowsky – Under One Roof, Redwoods, Rock Haven, That Man: Peter Berlin
- John Du Prez (born 1946) – Monty Python's The Meaning of Life, Oxford Blues, A Fish Called Wanda
- Anne Dudley (born 1956) – American History X, The Crying Game, The Full Monty
- Antoine Duhamel (1925–2014) – Pierrot le Fou, Week End
- Charles Dumont (1929–2024) – Les gourmandines, Trafic, Le commando des chauds lapins
- Isaak Dunayevsky (1900–1955) – Circus, Jolly Fellows, Volga-Volga
- Maksim Dunayevsky (born 1945) – d'Artagnan and Three Musketeers, Mary Poppins, Goodbye, The Witches Cave
- Clay Duncan – Blade: The Series, The Grid, Fetch
- Robert Duncan – Buffy the Vampire Slayer, Lie to Me, Castle
- Trevor Duncan (1924–2005) – Little Red Monkey, The Long Haul
- George Duning (1908–2000) – From Here to Eternity, The Devil at 4 O'Clock, Me and the Colonel
- The Dust Brothers (formed 1985) – Fight Club
- Jacques Dutronc (born 1943) – Antoine et Sébastien, Sale rêveur, Van Gogh
- Frank Duval (born 1940) – Derrick, The Old Fox, Unsere schönsten Jahre
- Jeff van Dyck (born 1969) – Rome: Total War, The Need for Speed, Sled Storm
- Jordan Dykstra (born 1985) – Blow the Man Down, Frontline
- Kiril Džajkovski (born 1965) – Dust, The Great Water, Bal-Can-Can
- Dado Dzihan (born 1964) – Well Tempered Corpses, Sitting Ducks, Breaking and Entering

== E ==
- Brian Easdale (1909–1995) – Black Narcissus, The Red Shoes, Peeping Tom
- Clint Eastwood (born 1930) – Mystic River, Million Dollar Baby, Flags of Our Fathers
- Kyle Eastwood (born 1968) – Letters from Iwo Jima, Gran Torino, Invictus
- Alex Ebert (born 1978) – All Is Lost, A Most Violent Year
- Nicolas Economou (1953–1993) – Marianne and Juliane, Unerreichbare Nähe, Rosa Luxemburg
- Randy Edelman (born 1947) – Dragon: The Bruce Lee Story, The Mask, Dragonheart, MacGyver, Ryan's Four, The Adventures of Brisco County, Jr.
- Greg Edmonson – King of the Hill, Firefly, Uncharted
- Carl Edouarde (1876–1932) – Kismet, The Hunchback of Notre Dame, The Private Life of Helen of Troy
- Ross Edwards (born 1943) – Phobia, Eternity, Paradise Road
- Jon Ehrlich (born 1950)
- Stefan Eichinger – Schätze der Welt – Erbe der Menschheit, Jeder Wind hat seine Reise, Drei Wege nach Samarkand
- Philippe Eidel (1956–2018) – Conte d'été, Un air de famille, Kadosh
- Cliff Eidelman (born 1964) – Star Trek VI: The Undiscovered Country, Christopher Columbus: The Discovery, Free Willy 3: The Rescue
- Christian Eigner (born 1971) – Blutrausch, Die Viertelliterklasse
- Ludovico Einaudi (born 1955) – Fuori Dal Mondo, This Is England, The Intouchables
- F. M. Einheit (born 1958) – Der Platz, Im Platz, Der Tag
- Richard Einhorn (born 1952) – The Prowler, Sister, Sister, The Passion of Joan of Arc
- Einstürzende Neubauten (formed 1980) – Berlin Babylon
- Der Eisenrost – Tokyo Fist, Bullet Ballet, Gemini
- Hanns Eisler (1898–1962) – Night and Fog, The Woman on the Beach
- Element of Crime (formed 1985) – Robert Zimmermann wundert sich über die Liebe
- Danny Elfman (born 1953) – Batman, Edward Scissorhands, The Nightmare Before Christmas, Spider-Man, Milk, Fifty Shades of Grey
- Jonathan Elias (born 1956) – Children of the Corn, Two Moon Junction, Pathfinder
- Rachel Elkind-Tourre (born 1939) – The Shining
- Boris Elkis – A Perfect Getaway, Bugged!, Streetwise
- Duke Ellington (1899–1974) – Anatomy of a Murder, Paris Blues, Change of Mind
- Dean Elliott (1925–1999) – Fantastic Four, Fangface, Alvin and the Chipmunks
- Jack Elliott (1927–2001) – The Comic, Support Your Local Gunfighter, The Jerk
- Don Ellis (1934–1978) – Moon Zero Two, The French Connection, The Seven-Ups, French Connection II
- Ray Ellis (1923–2008)
- Warren Ellis (born 1965) – The Proposition, The Assassination of Jesse James by the Coward Robert Ford, The Road
- Albert Elms (1920–2009) – Man in a Suitcase, The Prisoner, The Champions
- Keith Emerson (1944–2016) – Inferno, Nighthawks, Murder Rock
- Jon English (1949–2016) – Against the Wind, Touch and Go
- Tobias Enhus – The Matrix: Path of Neo, Spider-Man 3
- Jeremy Enigk (born 1974) – Dream With The Fishes, The United States of Leland
- Brian Eno (born 1948) – The Lovely Bones, Sebastiane, For All Mankind
- Roger Eno (born 1959) – For All Mankind
- Enya (born 1961) – The Frog Prince, The Celts
- Nicolas Errèra (born 1967) – Shaolin (film), The White Storm, XIII: The Conspiracy, The Butterfly (2002 film), Au nom de ma fille, Mountain Cry
- Harry Escott (born 1976) – Hard Candy, The Road to Guantanamo, Shame
- Ilan Eshkeri (born 1977) – Layer Cake, Ninja Assassin, Coriolanus
- Juan García Esquivel (1928–2002) – Aventuras de Cucuruchito y Pinocho, Locura pasional, The Tall Man
- Ray Evans (1915–2007) – Mister Ed, Tammy, Bonanza
- Sebastian Evans
- Explosions in the Sky (formed 1999) – Prince Avalanche

== F ==
- Adam F (born 1972) – Ali G Indahouse
- Bent Fabric (1924–2020) – The Poet and the Little Mother, Death Comes at High Noon, Klown
- Asser Fagerström (1912–1990) – Vastuu, People Not as Bad as They Seem
- Brian Fahey (1919–2007) – Curse of Simba, The Plank, Rhubarb
- Uwe Fahrenkrog-Petersen (born 1960) – All the Queen's Men, Igby Goes Down, Globi and the Stolen Shadows
- Sammy Fain (1902–1989) – Peter Pan, Calamity Jane, Love Is a Many-Splendored Thing
- Percy Faith (1908–1976) – Tammy Tell Me True, The Virginian, The Oscar
- Nima Fakhrara (born 1983) – Broadway Bound, The Courier, Gatchaman
- Harold Faltermeyer (born 1952) – Top Gun, Beverly Hills Cop, Tango & Cash
- David Fanshawe (1942–2010) – When the Boat Comes In, The Feathered Serpent, Flambards
- Robert Farnon (1917–2005) – Maytime in Mayfair, Captain Horatio Hornblower R.N., It's a Wonderful World
- Kurt Farquhar The King of Queens, Moesha, Sister, Sister, The Game, Black Lightning, Being Mary Jane, Girlfriends, Soul Food: The Series, Ned & Stacey
- Paul Farrer (born 1973) – Weakest Link, Dancing on Ice, The Krypton Factor
- Toufic Farroukh – Ana El Awan, Phantom Beirut, Women Beyond Borders
- Barry Fasman
- Bruce Faulconer (born 1951) – Dragon Ball Z, Your House and Home, Bass Champs
- Jeffrey Fayman – Open Water, co-founder and composer of Immediate Music
- Louis Febre (born 1959)
- Morton Feldman (1926–1987)
- Eric Fenby (1906–1997) – Jamaica Inn, Song of Summer
- George Fenton (1949–2026) – Gandhi, The Company of Wolves, The Fisher King, Groundhog Day
- Allyn Ferguson (1924–2010) – Barney Miller, Charlie's Angels, The Last Days of Patton
- Jay Ferguson (born 1947) – A Nightmare on Elm Street 5: The Dream Child, NCIS: Los Angeles, The Office
- Lorenzo Ferrero (born 1951) – Anemia
- Paul Ferris (1941–1995) – The Blood Beast Terror, Witchfinder General, The Creeping Flesh
- Nico Fidenco (1933–2022) – Emanuelle nera, La via della prostituzione, Zombi Holocaust
- Brad Fiedel (born 1951) – The Terminator, The Running Man, Red Heat, Total Recall, Terminator 2: Judgment Day, True Lies, Midnight Caller, Reasonable Doubts
- Jerry Fielding (1922–1980) – The Nightcomers, The Bad News Bears, Demon Seed
- Magnus Fiennes (born 1965) – Murphy's Law, Hustle, Death in Paradise
- Mike Figgis (born 1948) – Leaving Las Vegas, One Night Stand, Timecode
- Chad Fischer (born 1976)
- Eveline Fischer (born 1969) – Donkey Kong Country, Donkey Kong Country 3: Dixie Kong's Double Trouble!
- Luboš Fišer (1935–1999) – Valerie and Her Week of Wonders, Oxen, Kral Ubu
- Peter Fish (1956–2021) –
- Frank Fitzpatrick (born 1961)
- Stephen Flaherty (born 1960)
- Tom Flannery (born 1966)
- Maurice Fleuret (1932–1990)
- Flo & Eddie (formed 1965)
- Flying Lotus (born 1983) – Kuso, Blade Runner Black Out 2022, Perfect
- Adrian Foley, 8th Baron Foley (1923–2012)
- Tim Follin (born 1970)
- Ari Folman (born 1962)
- Robert Folk (born 1949) – Ace Ventura When Nature Calls, There Be Dragons, Toy Soldiers, Police Academy
- Troels Brun Folmann (born 1974)
- Keith Forsey (born 1948)
- Bruce Fowler (born 1947)
- Charles Fox (born 1940)
- Francis and the Lights – Robot & Frank
- Jesús Franco (1930–2013)
- Massimiliano Frani (born 1967)
- David Michael Frank (born 1948)
- Christopher Franke (born 1953) – Babylon 5, Universal Soldier, What the Bleep Do We Know!?
- Benjamin Frankel (1906–1973)
- Jason Frederick (born 1970)
- Jesse Frederick (born 1948) – Full House, Family Matters, Step by Step, Perfect Strangers, Better Days, Family Man
- Ian Freebairn-Smith (1932–2025)
- Freur (1982–1986)
- Gerald Fried (1928–2023) – Star Trek: The Original Series, Roots, Mr. Terrific, Flamingo Road, It's About Time
- Hugo Friedhofer (1901–1981)
- Bill Frisell (born 1951)
- Fred Frith (born 1949)
- Jürgen Fritz (born 1953) – Eine Frau für gewisse Stunden, Hard to Be a God
- John Frizzell (born 1966) – I Still Know What You Did Last Summer, Ghost Ship, Whiteout, Legion, The Loft
- Fabio Frizzi (born 1951)
- Edgar Froese (1944–2015)
- Front Line Assembly (formed 1986) – Quake III Arena
- Dominic Frontiere (1931–2017) – Hang 'Em High, Chisum, The Train Robbers, The Stunt Man, The Aviator, The Immortal, The Invaders, Matt Houston, Vegas
- Ben Frost (born 1980) – Sleeping Beauty, In Her Skin, Rokland
- Hideyuki Fukasawa (born 1970)
- Nathan Furst (born 1978)
- Giovanni Fusco (1906–1968)

== G ==
- Reeves Gabrels (born 1956)
- George Gabriel (born 1971)
- Peter Gabriel (born 1950) – Birdy, The Last Temptation of Christ, Rabbit-Proof Fence
- Serge Gainsbourg (1928–1991)
- Vincent Gallo (born 1961)
- Martin Galway (born 1966)
- Douglas Gamley (1924–1998)
- Jeet Ganguly (born 1977)
- Gara Garayev (1918–1982)
- Anja Garbarek (born 1970)
- Jan Garbarek (born 1947)
- Antón García Abril (1933–2021) – Tombs of the Blind Dead, Los santos inocentes
- Russell Garcia (1916–2011)
- Stu Gardner
- Dan Gardopée
- Garish (formed 1997)
- Snuff Garrett (1938–2015)
- Mort Garson (1924–2008)
- Georges Garvarentz (1932–1993)
- Giorgio Gaslini (1929–2014) – La Notte, Deep Red
- Tony Gatlif (born 1948) – Vengo, Transylvania, Gadjo dilo
- Mohammed Gauss
- Marvin Gaye (1939–1984) – Trouble Man
- Ron Geesin (born 1943)
- Grant Geissman (born 1953)
- James Gelfand (born 1959)
- Ivan Georgiev (born 1966) – S&M Judge
- Lisa Gerrard (born 1961)
- Matthew Gerrard
- George Gershwin (1898–1937)
- Irving Gertz (1915–2008)
- Stephen Geyer (born 1950)
- Ghantasala (1922–1974)
- Michael Giacchino (born 1967) – The Incredibles, The Family Stone, Mission: Impossible III and Ghost Protocol, Ratatouille, Up, Star Trek, Into Darkness and Beyond, Land of the Lost, Cars 2, Dawn of the Planet of the Apes and War for the Planet of the Apes, Jurassic World, Fallen Kingdom and Dominion, Inside Out, Zootopia, Doctor Strange, Spider-Man: Homecoming, Far from Home, No Way Home and Brand New Day, Coco, Extinct, The Batman, Lightyear, Thor: Love and Thunder, Ray Gunn, High in the Clouds
- Michael Gibbs (born 1937)
- Richard Gibbs (born 1955)
- Herschel Burke Gilbert (1918–2003)
- Gary Gilbertson
- Alan Gill
- Terry Gilkyson (1916–1999)
- Norman Gimbel (1925–2018)
- Alberto Ginastera (1916–1983)
- Daniel Giorgetti (born 1971)
- Paul Giovanni (1933–1990) – The Wicker Man
- Girls Against Boys (formed 1988) – Series 7: The Contenders
- Lutz Glandien (born 1954)
- Scott Glasgow
- Paul Glass (born 1934)
- Philip Glass (born 1937) – Koyaanisqatsi, The Hours, Candyman, Powaqqatsi
- Albert Glasser (1916–1998)
- Jason Gleed
- Patrick Gleeson (born 1934)
- Evelyn Glennie (born 1965)
- Nick Glennie-Smith (born 1951)
- Goblin
- Vladimír Godár (born 1956)
- Godiego (formed 1975) – Monkey, Ganbaron, Galaxy Express 999
- Lucio Godoy (born 1958)
- Ramana Gogula
- Matthias Gohl
- Ernest Gold (1921–1999) – Exodus
- Murray Gold (born 1969)
- Barry Goldberg (1942–2025)
- Billy Goldenberg (1936–2020)
- Elliot Goldenthal (born 1954) – Interview with the Vampire, Alien 3, Frida, Heat, Final Fantasy: The Spirits Within
- Alison Goldfrapp (born 1966) – My Summer of Love, Nowhere Boy
- Jean-Jacques Goldman (born 1951)
- Bobby Goldsboro (born 1941)
- Jerry Goldsmith (1929–2004) – Planet of the Apes, Patton, The Omen, Alien, Star Trek: The Motion Picture, Total Recall, Basic Instinct
- Joel Goldsmith (1957–2012)
- Jonathan Goldsmith
- Alexander Goldstein (born 1948) – Orange Winter, Storm Over Asia, Vasya, The Case of the Three Million
- Osvaldo Golijov (born 1960) – Youth Without Youth, Tetro, 11'09"01 September 11
- Benny Golson (1929–2024)
- Alejandro González Iñárritu (born 1963)
- Miles Goodman (1948–1996)
- Gordon Goodwin (1954–2025)
- Ron Goodwin (1925–2003)
- Alain Goraguer (1931–2023)
- Ludwig Göransson (born 1984) – Black Panther, The Mandalorian, Oppenheimer
- Michael Gordon (born 1956)
- Paul Gordon (1963–2016)
- Michael Gore (born 1951)
- Adam Gorgoni (born 1963)
- Manami Gotoh (born 1964)
- Louis F. Gottschalk (1864–1934)
- Glenn Gould (1932–1982)
- Morton Gould (1913–1996)
- Patrick Gowers (1936–2014)
- Desirée Goyette (born 1956)
- Paul Grabowsky (born 1958)
- Ron Grainer (1922–1981)
- Jason Graves
- Allan Gray (1902–1973)
- Barry Gray (1908–1984)
- Clifford Grey (1887–1941)
- Gavin Greenaway (born 1964)
- Johnny Green (1908–1989)
- Theo Green
- Walter Greene (1910–1983)
- Howard Greenfield (1936–1986)
- Jonny Greenwood (born 1971) – Bodysong, There Will Be Blood, Norwegian Wood
- Gustaf Grefberg (born 1974)
- Will Gregory (born 1959) – My Summer of Love, Nowhere Boy
- Harry Gregson-Williams (born 1961) – Antz, The Tigger Movie, Chicken Run, Shrek 1, 2, the Third and Forever After, Sinbad: Legend of the Seven Seas, Flushed Away, The Martian, The Last Duel
- Rupert Gregson-Williams (born 1966) – Over the Hedge, Bee Movie, Abominable, Grown Ups 1 and 2, Wonder Women, Aquaman and the Lost Kingdom
- Merv Griffin (1925–2007)
- Mark Griskey (born 1963)
- Raymond van het Groenewoud (born 1950)
- Launy Grøndahl (1886–1960)
- Herbert Grönemeyer (born 1956)
- Charles Gross (born 1934)
- Jacob Groth (born 1951)
- Louis Gruenberg (1884–1964) – Quicksand, Commandos Strike at Dawn, All the King's Men
- Larry Groupé (born 1957) – The Contender, The Outpost, Nothing But the Truth, Straw Dogs
- Dave Grusin (born 1934)
- Jay Gruska (born 1952)
- Sofia Gubaidulina (1931–2025)
- James William Guercio (born 1945) – Electra Glide in Blue
- Jean-Pierre Guiran (born 1950)
- Fuat Güner (born 1948)
- Christopher Gunning (1944–2023)
- Hildur Guðnadóttir (born 1982) – Joker, Chernobyl (TV Mini-Series)
- Gurukiran (born 1970)
- Sven Gyldmark (1904–1981)

== H ==
- Bárður Háberg (born 1979)
- Alexander Hacke (born 1965) – Das Wilde Leben, Head-On, Kaifeck Murder
- Manos Hadjidakis (1925–1994)
- Georg Haentzschel (1907–1992)
- Richard Hageman (1881–1966)
- Earle Hagen (1919–2008)
- Peter Hajba (born 1974)
- Haim
- Uzeyir Hajibeyov (1885–1948)
- Darko Hajsek (born 1959) – Madonna
- Taro Hakase (born 1968)
- Halfdan E (born 1965)
- Dick Halligan (1943–2022)
- Shirō Hamaguchi (born 1969)
- Chico Hamilton (1921–2013)
- Marvin Hamlisch (1944–2012)
- Chuck Hammer
- Jan Hammer (born 1948)
- Oscar Hammerstein II (1885–1960)
- Hamsalekha (born 1951)
- Herbie Hancock (born 1940)
- Frederic Hand (born 1947)
- Kentarō Haneda (1949–2007)
- James Hannigan (born 1971)
- Ilmari Hannikainen (1892–1955)
- Glen Hansard (1970–2026)
- Raymond Hanson (1913–1976)
- Petr Hapka (1944–2014)
- Edward W. Hardy (born 1992) – The Woodsman
- Hagood Hardy (1937–1997)
- Jon Hare (born 1966)
- Kurt Harland (born 1963)
- Leigh Harline (1907–1969)
- Barry Harman (born 1952)
- Joe Harnell (1924–2005) The Incredible Hulk (1978 TV series), Santa Barbara (TV series)
- Don L. Harper
- Albert Harris (1916–2005)
- Johnny Harris (1932–2020)
- Sue Harris
- John Harrison (born 1948)
- Jimmy Harry
- Jimmy Hart (born 1943)
- Hal Hartley (born 1959)
- Richard Hartley (born 1944)
- Paul Hartnoll (born 1968)
- Mick Harvey (born 1958)
- Richard Harvey (born 1953)
- Bo Harwood (1946–2022)
- Tomoki Hasegawa (born 1957)
- Ichiko Hashimoto (born 1952)
- Paul Haslinger (born 1962)
- Aki Hata (born 1966)
- Tony Hatch (born 1939)
- Donny Hathaway (1945–1979)
- Marvin Hatley (1905–1986)
- Katsuhisa Hattori (1936–2020)
- M. Maurice Hawkesworth (born 1960)
- Alan Hawkshaw (1937–2021)
- Fumio Hayasaka (1914–1955)
- Hikaru Hayashi (1931–2012) – Death by Hanging
- Pete Haycock (1951–2013) – One False Move
- Isaac Hayes (1942–2008)
- Jack Hayes (1911–2011)
- Lennie Hayton (1908–1971)
- Richard Hazard (1921–2000)
- Michael Hearst (born 1972)
- Neal Hefti (1922–2008)
- Reinhold Heil (born 1954)
- Zack Hemsey (born 1983)
- Michael Hennagin (1936–1993)
- Joe Henry (born 1960)
- Hans Werner Henze (1926–2012)
- Paul Hepker (born 1967)
- Victor Herbert (1859–1924)
- Michel Herr (born 1949)
- Bernard Herrmann (1911–1975) – Psycho, North by Northwest, Vertigo, Citizen Kane, Taxi Driver
- Paul Hertzog – Bloodsport, Kickboxer
- David Hess (1936–2011)
- Nigel Hess (born 1953)
- Eric Hester (born 1974)
- Andrew Hewitt (born 1976)
- David Hewson (born 1953)
- Nick Hexum (born 1971)
- Miki Higashino (born 1968)
- Nat Hiken (1914–1968)
- Hilmar Örn Hilmarsson (born 1958)
- Stephen Hilton (born 1974)
- Paul Hindemith (1895–1963)
- Yoshihisa Hirano (born 1971)
- Susumu Hirasawa (born 1954)
- David Hirschfelder (born 1960)
- Joel Hirschhorn (1937–2005)
- Joe Hisaishi (born 1950)
- Alun Hoddinott (1929–2008) – Sword of Sherwood Forest
- Derrick Hodge (born 1979)
- Michael Hoenig (born 1952)
- Bernard Hoffer (born 1934)
- Robin Hoffmann (born 1984)
- Friedrich Hollaender (1896–1976)
- Dulcie Holland (1913–2000)
- David Holmes (born 1969)
- Rupert Holmes (born 1947)
- Bo Holten (born 1948) – The Element of Crime
- Arthur Honegger (1892–1955)
- Honk (formed 1970) – Five Summer Stories
- Hannu Honkonen (born 1982)
- Johan Hoogewijs (born 1957)
- Les Hooper (born 1940)
- Nicholas Hooper (born 1952) – Harry Potter and the Order of the Phoenix, Harry Potter and the Half-Blood Prince, Land of the Tiger
- Nellee Hooper (born 1963)
- Ciaran Hope (born 1974) – The Letters, Truth About Kerry
- Anthony Hopkins (born 1937) – August, Slipstream, Dylan Thomas: Return Journey
- Antony Hopkins (1921–2014)
- Jon Hopkins (born 1979)
- Kenyon Hopkins (1912–1983)
- Steve Hopkins
- Hal Hopper (1912–1970)
- Keith Hopwood (born 1946)
- Trevor Horn (born 1949)
- James Horner (1953–2015) – Aliens, An American Tail and Fievel Goes West, The Land Before Time, Once Upon a Forest, We're Back! A Dinosaur's Story, The Pagemaster, Braveheart, Balto, Titanic, Avatar, The Amazing Spider-Man
- André Hossein (1905–1983)
- Tomoyasu Hotei (born 1962) – Fear and Loathing in Las Vegas, Samurai Fiction
- James Newton Howard (born 1951) – The Sixth Sense, Unbreakable, The Village, Lady in the Water, The Dark Knight
- Ken Howard (1939–2024)
- Alan Howarth (born 1948)
- Tom Howe (born 1977)
- Peter Howell (born 1949)
- Nihad Hrustanbegovic (born 1973)
- Rob Hubbard (born 1955) – Master of Magic, Commando, Auf Wiedersehen Monty
- L. Ron Hubbard (1911–1986) – The Case He Couldn't Crack, The Problem of Life, What Happened to These Civilizations?
- Robert Hughes (1912–2007)
- Chris Hülsbeck (born 1968)
- Scott Humphrey
- Andy Hunter (born 1974)
- Gottfried Huppertz (1887–1937) – Metropolis, Die Nibelungen, The Green Domino
- Craig Huxley (born 1954)
- Søren Hyldgaard (1962–2018)
- Dick Hyman (born 1927)

== I ==
- Jacques Ibert (1890–1962)
- Abdullah Ibrahim (1934–2026)
- Toshi Ichiyanagi (1933–2022)
- Akira Ifukube (1914–2006)
- Alberto Iglesias (born 1955)
- Ilaiyaraaja (born 1943)
- Jerrold Immel (born 1936)
- In the Nursery
- Daniel Ingram (born 1975)
- Neil Innes (1944–2019)
- Damon Intrabartolo (1975–2013)
- John Ireland (1879–1962)
- Markéta Irglová (born 1988)
- Pat Irwin (born 1955)
- Mark Isham (born 1951)
- Chu Ishikawa (1966–2017)
- Emir Işılay (born 1978)
- Robert Israel (born 1963)
- Masumi Itō
- Teiji Ito (1935–1982)
- Ivan Iusco (born 1970)
- Peter Ivers (1946–1983)
- Taku Iwasaki (born 1968)
- Masaharu Iwata (born 1966)

== J ==
- Steve Jablonsky (born 1970) – Transformers, The Island, Steamboy
- Henry Jackman (born 1974) – Monsters vs. Aliens, Gulliver's Travels (2010 film), Winnie the Pooh (2011 film), Puss in Boots (2011 film), Wreck-It Ralph, Turbo (film), Captain America: The Winter Soldier, Big Hero 6 (film), Captain America: Civil War, Kong: Skull Island, Ralph Breaks the Internet, Ron's Gone Wrong
- Danny Jacob (born 1956)
- Richard Jacques (born 1973)
- Óli Jógvansson (born 1969)
- Mick Jagger (born 1943) – Invocation of My Demon Brother, Alfie
- Jaidev (1918–1987)
- Shankar Jaikishan
- Ravindra Jain (1944–2015)
- Bob James (born 1939) – Taxi, Daniel
- Malek Jandali (born 1972)
- Chas Jankel (born 1952)
- Enzo Jannacci (1935–2013) – Seven Beauties
- Werner Janssen (1899–1990)
- Jean-Michel Jarre (born 1948)
- Maurice Jarre (1924–2009) – Lawrence of Arabia, Doctor Zhivago, Topaz, Dead Poets Society
- Michael Jary (1906–1988)
- Maurice Jaubert (1900–1940)
- Harris Jayaraj (born 1975)
- Wyclef Jean (born 1969)
- Def Jef (born 1970)
- Karl Jenkins (born 1944) – The Celts
- Merrill Jenson (born 1947)
- Zhao Jiping (born 1945)
- Jo Yeong-wook (born 1962)
- Antônio Carlos Jobim (1927–1994)
- Eddie Jobson (born 1955)
- Adan Jodorowsky (born 1979) – Echek, Teou
- Alejandro Jodorowsky (born 1929) – El Topo, The Holy Mountain
- Barði Jóhannsson (born 1975) – Reykjavík-Rotterdam, Fíaskó, new music for the silent film Häxan
- Óli Jógvansson (born 1969)
- Jóhann Jóhannsson (1969–2018)
- Elton John (born 1947)
- Johnson (1953–2011)
- J. J. Johnson (1924–2001)
- Laurie Johnson (1927–2024)
- Nathan Johnson (born 1976)
- Adrian Johnston (born 1961)
- Arthur Johnston (1898–1954)
- Bobby Johnston (born 1967)
- Jim Johnston (born 1952)
- Brian Jones (1942–1969)
- Dan Jones
- John Paul Jones (born 1946)
- Quincy Jones (1933–2024) – In Cold Blood, In the Heat of the Night, The Color Purple, Roots
- Quincy Jones III (born 1968)
- Raymond Jones
- Ron Jones (born 1954)
- Tim Jones (born 1971) – The Forsaken, Chuck, Karla
- Trevor Jones (born 1949) – The Dark Crystal, Dark City, Mississippi Burning, The Last of the Mohicans
- Vincent Jones – Parks and Recreation
- Jónsi (born 1975)
- Lakshman Joseph de Saram – Bel Ami, Between Two Worlds
- Peter Joseph (born 1979)
- Richard Joseph (1953–2007)
- Michael Josephs (born 1959)
- Wilfred Josephs (1927–1997)
- Paul K. Joyce (born 1957)
- Laurence Juber (born 1952)
- Jude (born 1969)
- Don Julian (1937–1998) – Savage!, Shorty the Pimp
- Joseph Julian Gonzalez
- David Julyan (born 1967) – Memento, The Descent, The Prestige
- Junkie XL (born 1967) – DOA: Dead or Alive, SSX Blur, Need for Speed: ProStreet
- Walter Jurmann (1903–1971)
- Patrick Juvet (1950–2021)

== K ==
- John Erik Kaada (born 1975) – O' Horten, Natural Born Star
- Dmitri Kabalevsky (1904–1987)
- Jan A.P. Kaczmarek (1953–2024)
- Mauricio Kagel (1931–2008)
- Gus Kahn (1886–1941)
- Akari Kaida (born 1974)
- Yuki Kajiura (born 1965)
- Paul Kalkbrenner (born 1977)
- George Kallis (born 1974)
- Bert Kalmar (1884–1947)
- Peter Kam (born 1961)
- Camara Kambon (born 1973)
- Michael Kamen (1948–2003) Robin Hood: Prince of Thieves, Don Juan Demarco, Mr. Holland's Opus, License To Kill
- John Kander (born 1927)
- Artie Kane (1929–2022)
- Shigeru Kan-no (born 1959)
- Noam Kaniel (born 1962) – Power Rangers, Glitter Force, Digimon Fusion,Code Lyoko (English version)
- Yoko Kanno (born 1963) – Cowboy Bebop, Darker than Black, Macross Plus, Turn A Gundam, The Vision of Escaflowne, Ghost in the Shell: Stand Alone Complex, Wolf's Rain, Kids on the Slope, Terror in Resonance
- Yugo Kanno (born 1977) – JoJo's Bizarre Adventure: seasons 2, 3, and 4, Batman Ninja
- Tuomas Kantelinen (born 1969)
- Bronisław Kaper (1902–1983)
- Sol Kaplan (1919–1990)
- Eleni Karaindrou (born 1941)
- Nele Karajlić (born 1962)
- Anton Karas (1906–1985)
- Fred Karlin (1936–2004)
- Laura Karpman (born 1959)
- Kent Karlsson (born 1945)
- Al Kasha (1937–2020)
- Peter Kater (born 1958)
- Emilio Kauderer
- Jake Kaufman (born 1981)
- John Kavanaugh
- Kenji Kawai (born 1957)
- Arthur Kay (1881–1969)
- Norman Kay (1929–2001)
- Eric Kaz (born 1946) – Greetings, Hi, Mom!
- Dave Koz (born 1963)
- Yakov Kazyansky (born 1948)
- Brian Keane (born 1953)
- John E. Keane (born 1952)
- John M. Keane (born 1965)
- Tom Keenlyside (born 1950) – Mega Man, Monster Rancher, Dragon Ball Z
- M. M. Keeravani (born 1961)
- Roger Kellaway (born 1939)
- Jack Keller (1938–2005)
- Paul Kelly (born 1955)
- Victoria Kelly – Fracture, The Ugly, Black Sheep
- Rolfe Kent (born 1963)
- Walter Kent (1911–1994)
- Jerome Kern (1885–1945)
- Premasiri Kernadasa (1937–2008)
- Aram Khachaturian (1903–1978)
- Khaled (born 1960)
- Aashish Khan (1939–2024)
- Ali Akbar Khan (1922–2009)
- Praga Khan (born 1959)
- Usha Khanna (born 1941)
- Yuri Khanon (born 1965) – European Film Awards-1988: Days of Eclipse, Save and Preserve
- Alex Khaskin (born 1961)
- Mohammed Zahur Khayyam (1927–2019)
- Tikhon Khrennikov (1913–2007)
- Khawaja Khurshid Anwar (1912–1984)
- Shunsuke Kikuchi (1931–2021) – Dragon Ball Z
- Wojciech Kilar (1932–2013) – Bram Stoker's Dracula, The Pianist, We Own the Night, Pan Tadeusz
- Kevin Kiner (born 1958)
- Alastair King (born 1967)
- John King
- Kaki King (born 1979)
- Gershon Kingsley (1922–2019)
- Basil Kirchin (1927–2005)
- Gökhan Kırdar (born 1970)
- Grant Kirkhope (born 1962)
- Martin Kiszko (born 1958)
- Kitarō (born 1953)
- David Kitay (born 1961)
- Johnny Klimek (born 1962)
- Jan Klusák (born 1934)
- David Knopfler (born 1952)
- Mark Knopfler (born 1949) – The Princess Bride
- Leon Ko
- Erland von Koch (1910–2009) – Kris, It Rains on Our Love, Girl with Hyacinths
- Konstancja Kochaniec (born 1976)
- Krzysztof Komeda (1931–1969) – The Fearless Vampire Killers, Rosemary's Baby, Knife in the Water, Cul-de-sac
- Koji Kondo (born 1961) – Mario, The Legend of Zelda, Star Fox 64
- Robbie Kondor
- Joseph Koo (1931–2023)
- Al Kooper (born 1944)
- Ben Kopec (born 1981)
- Hermann Kopp (born 1954) – Nekromantik, Der Todesking, Nekromantik 2
- Rudolph G. Kopp (1887–1974) – Sign of the Cross, Cleopatra (DeMille 1934), The Crusades.
- Anders Koppel (born 1947)
- Erich Wolfgang Korngold (1897–1957) – Anthony Adverse, The Adventures of Robin Hood
- Danny Kortchmar (born 1946)
- Mark Korven – I've Heard the Mermaids Singing, Cube, A Scattering of Seeds
- Richard Kosinski
- Joseph Kosma (1905–1969)
- Irwin Kostal (1911–1994) – The Sound of Music, Mary Poppins, Fantasia (1982 digital re-recording)
- Robert Kraft (born 1955)
- William Kraft (1923–2022)
- Robert J. Kral (born 1967)
- Wayne Kramer (1948–2024)
- Raoul Kraushaar (1908–2001)
- John Henry Kreitler (1948–2024)
- K. M. Radha Krishnan
- David Kristian (born 1967)
- Mina Kubota (born 1972)
- Vivian Kubrick (born 1960)
- Taro Kudou
- G. V. Prakash Kumar (born 1987)
- Gary Kuo
- Meyer Kupferman (1926–2003)
- David Kurtz
- Emir Kusturica (born 1954)
- Keisuke Kuwata (born 1956)
- Chan Kwong-Wing (born 1967)
- Jesper Kyd (born 1972)
- Milan Kymlicka (1936–2008)

== L ==
- John T. La Barbera – Pane Amaro, What's Up Scarlet?, Children of Fate: Life and Death in a Sicilian Family
- Fariborz Lachini (born 1949)
- Bappi Lahiri (1952–2022)
- Francis Lai (1932–2018) – Love Story, Bilitis, A Man and a Woman
- Laibach (formed 1980) – Iron Sky
- Nick Laird-Clowes (born 1957)
- Constant Lambert (1905–1951)
- Russ Landau Survivor
- Marcel Landowski (1915–1999)
- Jim Lang (born 1950) – Hey Arnold!: The Movie
- Bruce Langhorne (1938–2017)
- Daniel Lanois (born 1951)
- Laraaji (born 1943)
- Glen A. Larson (1937–2014)
- Nathan Larson (born 1970)
- Richard LaSalle (1918–2015)
- James Last (1929–2015)
- Alexander Laszlo (1895–1975)
- Felice Lattuada (1882–1962)
- Tats Lau (born 1963)
- Ken Lauber (born 1941)
- William Lava (1911–1971)
- Angelo Francesco Lavagnino (1909–1987)
- Tom Lavin
- James Lavino (born 1973)
- Elliot Lawrence (1925–2021)
- Stephen J. Lawrence (1939–2021)
- Maury Laws (1923–2019)
- Raam Laxman (1942–2021)
- Jean-Marc Lederman
- Lee Byung-woo (born 1965) – A Tale of Two Sisters, The Host, Mother
- Ian LeFeuvre
- Raymond Lefèvre (1929–2008) – Le Gendarme de Saint-Tropez, La Soupe aux choux
- Mark Leggett
- Michel Legrand (1932–2019) – Cléo from 5 to 7, The Umbrellas of Cherbourg, F for Fake
- Barry Leitch (born 1970)
- Christopher Lennertz (born 1972) – Medal of Honor: Rising Sun, Saint Sinner, Alvin and the Chipmunks, Supernatural
- Sean Lennon (born 1975)
- Nicholas Lens (born 1957)
- Stefano Lentini (born 1974)
- Jack Lenz (born 1949)
- Patrick Leonard (born 1956)
- Raymond Leppard (1927–2019)
- Sondre Lerche (born 1982) – Dan in Real Life
- Cory Lerios (born 1951)
- César Lerner
- Jérôme Leroy (born 1981)
- Yaacov Bilansky Levanon (1895–1965)
- Sylvester Levay (born 1945)
- Laurent Levesque (born 1970)
- Mica Levi (born 1987) – Under the Skin, Jackie, Marjorie Prime, Monos
- Geoff Levin (born 1945)
- Stewart Levin
- James S. Levine (born 1974)
- Michael A. Levine (born 1964)
- Krishna Levy (born 1964) – 8 Women
- Louis Levy (1894–1957)
- Shuki Levy (born 1947) – Inspector Gadget, Digimon Adventure, Spider-Man: The Animated Series, He-Man
- Frank Lewin (1925–2008)
- Herschell Gordon Lewis (1926–2016)
- Dominic Lewis (born 1985)
- Lesle Lewis (born 1960)
- Jan Leyers (born 1958)
- Blake Leyh (born 1962)
- Sven Libaek (born 1938)
- Michael Licari
- Daniel Licht (1957–2017)
- Russell Lieblich (1953–2005)
- Krister Linder (born 1970)
- Hal Lindes (born 1953)
- Mort Lindsey (1923–2012)
- Michael Lira (born 1975) – Wyrmwood, Growing Up Smith, The Hunter
- Zdeněk Liška (1922–1983)
- Zülfü Livaneli (born 1946)
- Jay Livingston (1915–2001)
- Andrew Lloyd Webber (born 1948)
- Michael Lloyd (born 1948)
- Lowell Lo (born 1950)
- Los Lobos
- Andrew Lockington (born 1974)
- Didier Lockwood (1956–2018)
- Malcolm Lockyer (1923–1976)
- Joseph LoDuca (born 1958) – Xena: Warrior Princess, The Evil Dead, Hercules: The Legendary Journeys, Army of Darkness
- John Loeffler (born 1951)
- Frederick Loewe (1901–1988)
- Henning Lohner (born 1961)
- William Loose (1910–1991)
- Jon Lord (1941–2012)
- Rob Lord (born 1966)
- Saša Lošić (born 1964)
- Alexina Louie (born 1949)
- Louiguy (1916–1991)
- Jacques Loussier (1934–2019)
- Chris Lowe (born 1959)
- David Lowe (born 1959)
- Mundell Lowe (1922–2017)
- Jaye Luckett (born 1974)
- Ralph Lundsten (1936–2023)
- Evan Lurie (born 1954)
- John Lurie (born 1952)
- Danny Lux (born 1969)
- David Lynch (1946–2025) – Eraserhead, Inland Empire, Twin Peaks: Fire Walk with Me
- Liam Lynch (born 1970)

== M ==
- M83 (formed 2001) – Oblivion
- Lebo M (born 1964) – The Lion King 1½, Long Night's Journey into Day
- Galt MacDermot (1928–2018)
- Teo Macero (1925–2008) – Virus, A.k.a. Cassius Clay
- Bruno Maderna (1920–1973) – La morte ha fatto l'uovo
- Madonna (born 1958)
- Manoj George
- Jun Maeda (born 1975)
- Michel Magne (1930–1984)
- K. V. Mahadevan (1918–2001)
- Shankar Mahadevan (born 1967)
- Taj Mahal (born 1942)
- Vusi Mahlasela
- Jerzy Maksymiuk (born 1936)
- Anu Malik (born 1960)
- Kalyani Malik
- Dmitry Malikov (born 1970)
- Matty Malneck (1903–1981)
- Albert Hay Malotte (1895–1964)
- Riichiro Manabe (1924–2015)
- Josh Mancell (born 1969)
- Mark Mancina (born 1957) – Tarzan, Brother Bear, Planes 1 and 2, Moana, The Sea Beast
- Henry Mancini (1924–1994)
- Johnny Mandel (1925–2020)
- Christopher Mann (born 1972)
- Roger Joseph Manning, Jr. (born 1966)
- Franco Mannino (1924–2005)
- Manohar
- Clint Mansell (born 1963) – π, Requiem for a Dream, The Fountain, Moon, Black Swan,
- Keith Mansfield (born 1943)
- Marilyn Manson (born 1969) – Resident Evil, Splatter Sisters
- Tigran Mansurian (born 1939) – The Color of Pomegranates, We and Our Mountains
- Kevin Manthei (born 1970)
- Homero Manzi (1907–1951)
- Matthew Margeson (born 1980)
- Dario Marianelli (born 1963) – Atonement, V for Vendetta, Agora, Pride & Prejudice
- Anthony Marinelli (born 1959) – Stand by Me, Young Guns, Leaving Las Vegas, Chapter 27
- Michael Mark
- Chris Marker (1921–2012) – Sans Soleil
- Yannis Markopoulos (1939–2023)
- Richard Marriott (born 1951)
- Branford Marsalis (born 1960)
- Wynton Marsalis (born 1961)
- George Martin (1926–2016) – Yellow Submarine, Live and Let Die
- Jerry Martin
- Cliff Martinez (born 1954) – Sex, Lies, and Videotape, Solaris, Kafka
- Jean Martinon (1910–1976)
- Richard Marvin
- J Mascis (born 1965)
- John Massari (born 1957)
- Massive Attack (formed 1988) – Danny the Dog, Bullet Boy, Battle in Seattle, Gomorrah
- Diego Masson (born 1935)
- Toshio Masuda (born 1959)
- Muir Mathieson (1911–1975)
- Hayato Matsuo (born 1965)
- Masaya Matsuura (born 1961)
- Dave Matthews (born 1967)
- Siegfried Matthus (1934–2021)
- Billy May (1916–2014)
- Brian May (1934–1997)
- Simon May (born 1944) – EastEnders, Howards' Way
- Curtis Mayfield (1942–1999) – Superfly
- Toshiro Mayuzumi (1929–1997)
- Dennis McCarthy (born 1945)
- Paul McCartney (born 1942)
- Craig McConnell (born 1972)
- Bear McCreary (born 1979) – Battlestar Galactica (2004), Agents of S.H.I.E.L.D., Outlander, The Walking Dead, The Lord of the Rings: The Rings of Power
- Nathan McCree (born 1969)
- Keff McCulloch (born 1954)
- Gary McFarland (1933–1971)
- Rory McFarlane
- Don McGlashan (born 1959)
- Bill McGuffie (1927–1987)
- David McHugh (born 1941)
- Tim McIntire (1944–1986)
- Rod McKuen (1933–2015)
- Joel McNeely (born 1959)
- Joe Meek (1929–1967)
- DJ Mehdi (1977–2011)
- Brad Mehldau (born 1970)
- Edmund Meisel (1894–1930) – The Battleship Potemkin
- Gil Mellé (1931–2004) – The Andromeda Strain, My Sweet Charlie, Columbo
- Peter Rodgers Melnick (Born 1958)
- Nami Melumad (born 1988)
- Mike Melvoin (1937–2012)
- Wendy Melvoin (born 1964) – Heroes, Dangerous Minds, Crossing Jordan
- Loy Mendonsa
- Alan Menken (born 1949)
- Dean Menta (born 1966)
- Johnny Mercer (1909–1976)
- Freddie Mercury (1946–1991)
- Wim Mertens (born 1953)
- Mateo Messina (born 1972)
- Dominic Messinger
- Metric
- Micki Meuser
- Mickey J. Meyer
- Lanny Meyers
- Michel Michelet (1894–1995)
- Guy Michelmore (born 1957)
- Mario Migliardi (1919–2000)
- Darius Milhaud (1892–1974)
- Mladen Milicevic
- Helen Miller (1925–2006)
- Marcus Miller (born 1959)
- Randy Miller
- Robyn Miller (born 1966)
- Mario Millo (born 1955)
- Chieli Minucci (born 1958)
- Paul Misraki (1908–1998)
- Shyamal Mitra (1929–1987)
- Shinkichi Mitsumune (born 1963)
- Shinji Miyazaki (born 1956)
- Hajime Mizoguchi (born 1960)
- Vic Mizzy (1916–2009)
- Moby (born 1965)
- Cyril J. Mockridge (1896–1979)
- Mocky (born 1974) – Carole & Tuesday, UFO in Her Eyes
- Mogwai
- Ghulam Mohammed (1903–1968)
- Madan Mohan (1924–1975)
- S. Mohinder (1925–2020)
- Shantanu Moitra (born 1968) – October (soundtrack)
- Charlie Mole
- Niclas Molinder (born 1970)
- Paddy Moloney (1938–2021)
- Money Mark (born 1960)
- Francis Monkman (1949–2023)
- Egil Monn-Iversen (1928–2017)
- Hugo Montenegro (1925–1981)
- Guy Moon (1962–2026)
- Anthony Moore (born 1948)
- Brandon Moore (born 1976)
- Dudley Moore (1935–2002)
- Lennie Moore (born 1961)
- Michael Moran (born 1948)
- Alissa Moreno
- Gaby Moreno (born 1981)
- Mark Morgan (born 1961)
- Akihiko Mori (1966–1998)
- Nobuhiko Morino (born 1970)
- Angela Morley (1924–2008) – Watership Down, The Slipper and the Rose, The Lady Is a Square
- Giorgio Moroder (born 1940) – Midnight Express, Flashdance, American Gigolo, Scarface (1983 film), Impressionen unter Wasser
- Jerome Moross (1913–1983)
- Andrea Morricone (born 1964) – Cinema Paradiso, Capturing the Friedmans
- Ennio Morricone (1928–2020) – A Fistful of Dollars, For a Few Dollars More, The Good, the Bad and the Ugly, The Untouchables
- John Morris (1926–2018)
- Trevor Morris (born 1970)
- Bob Mothersbaugh (born 1952)
- Mark Mothersbaugh (born 1950) – The Royal Tenenbaums, The Life Aquatic with Steve Zissou, Rugrats, Crash Bandicoot, Hotel Transylvania, Cloudy with a Chance of Meatballs
- Rob Mounsey (born 1952)
- Leszek Możdżer (born 1971) – Nienasycenie, 1 000 000 $, Discover Chopin
- Dominic Muldowney (born 1952) – Nineteen Eighty-Four, Sharpe, Copenhagen
- Mugison (born 1976) – A Little Trip to Heaven
- Nico Muhly (born 1981) – The Reader, Margaret
- Manas Mukherjee (1943–1986)
- Hemanta Kumar Mukhopadhyay (1920–1989)
- Mark Mueller (born 1957)
- Pankaj Mullick (1905–1978)
- David Munrow (1942–1976)
- Vano Muradeli (1908–1970)
- Rika Muranaka – Metal Gear Solid, Metal Gear Solid 2: Sons of Liberty, Metal Gear Solid 3: Snake Eater
- John Murphy (born 1965) – 28 Days Later, Lock, Stock and Two Smoking Barrels, Sunshine, Kick-###
- Walter Murphy (born 1952)
- Sean Murray
- Selma Mutal – The Milk of Sorrow, The Vanished Elephant, Madeinusa, Undertow – Contracorriente,
- Stanley Myers (1930–1993) – The Deer Hunter, The Voyager, The Witches

== N ==
- Kōtarō Nakagawa (born 1969)
- Masato Nakamura (born 1958)
- Takayuki Nakamura (born 1967)
- Desmond Nakano
- Naked Lunch
- Gianna Nannini (born 1954)
- Gregor Narholz (born 1969) (The SpongeBob SquarePants Movie)
- Akihiko Narita (born 1980)
- José Luis Narom (born 1963)
- Michiko Naruke (born 1967)
- Mario Nascimbene (1913–2002)
- Nash the Slash (1948–2014)
- Nashad (1923–1981)
- Naushad Ali (1919–2006)
- Javier Navarrete (born 1956)
- O. P. Nayyar (1926–2007)
- Chris Neal
- Blake Neely (born 1969)
- Oliver Nelson (1932–1975)
- Neo
- Peter Nero (1934–2023)
- Michael Nesmith (1942–2021)
- Olga Neuwirth (born 1968)
- New Order
- Ira Newborn (born 1949)
- Alfred Newman (1900–1970)
- David Newman (born 1954) (The Brave Little Toaster, Matilda, Anastasia, Ice Age, Scooby-Doo, The Cat in the Hat, Scooby Doo 2: Monsters Unleashed, Animals United, Tarzan, Pets United)
- Emil Newman (1911–1984)
- Joey Newman (born 1976)
- Lionel Newman (1916–1989)
- Randy Newman (born 1943) (Toy Story, James and the Giant Peach, A Bug's Life, Monsters, Inc., Cars 1 and 3, The Princess and the Frog)
- Thomas Newman (born 1955) (Finding Nemo, Lemony Snicket's A Series of Unfortunate Events, WALL-E, Elemental)
- The Newton Brothers
- Mbongeni Ngema (1955–2023)
- David Nichtern (born 1948)
- Bruno Nicolai (1926–1991)
- Lennie Niehaus (1929–2020)
- Tomohito Nishiura (born 1973)
- Joy Nilo (born 1970)
- Harry Nilsson (1941–1994)
- Jack Nitzsche (1937–2000)
- Yuji Nomi (born 1958)
- Ehsaan Noorani (born 1963)
- Per Nørgård (1932–2025)
- Graeme Norgate (born 1971)
- Monty Norman (1928–2022)
- Alex North (1910–1991)
- Christopher North (born 1969)
- Julian Nott (born 1960)
- The Notwist
- Jesse Novak
- Michael Nyman (born 1944)
- Molly Nyman (born 1979)

== O ==
- Karen O (born 1978)
- Seán Ó Riada (1931–1971)
- Gerald O'Brien
- Richard O'Brien (born 1942)
- Greg O'Connor (born 1967)
- Martin O'Donnell (born 1955)
- Tom O'Horgan (1924–2009)
- Walter O'Keefe (1900–1983)
- Sharon O'Neill (born 1952)
- Paul Oakenfold (born 1963)
- Erkan Oğur (born 1954)
- Hisayoshi Ogura (born 1959)
- Mike Oldfield (born 1953)
- Bijan Olia
- William Olvis (1957–2014)
- Orbital
- Norman Orenstein
- Shinji Orito (born 1973)
- Buxton Orr (1924–1997)
- Riz Ortolani (1926–2014)
- Atli Örvarsson (born 1970)
- Leslie Osborne (1905–1990)
- Michiru Oshima (born 1961)
- Osibisa
- Kow Otani (born 1957)
- Alex Otterlei (born 1968)
- John Ottman (born 1964)
- Vyacheslav Ovchinnikov (1936–2019)
- Mark Ovenden
- Reg Owen (1921–1978)
- Attila Özdemiroğlu (1943–2016)

== P ==
- Craig Padilla
- Mauro Pagani (born 1946)
- Gene Page (1939–1998)
- Jimmy Page (born 1944)
- Marty Paich (1925–1995)
- Owen Pallett (born 1979)
- Shelly Palmer (born 1958)
- Alan Parker (born 1944)
- Clifton Parker (1905–1989)
- Elizabeth Parker
- Jim Parker (1934–2023)
- Dean Parks (born 1946)
- Gordon Parks (1912–2006)
- Van Dyke Parks (born 1943)
- Arvo Pärt (born 1935)
- Ioan Gyuri Pascu (1961–2016)
- Johnny Pate (born 1923)
- Anthony Pateras
- R. P. Patnaik (born 1970)
- Shawn Patterson (born 1965)
- Mike Patton (born 1968)
- Arun Paudwal (1944–1991)
- Alex Paul (born 1961)
- Charles Paul (1902–1990)
- Gene de Paul (1919–1988)
- Johnny Pearson (1925–2011)
- Gunner Møller Pedersen
- Bernard Peiffer (1922–1976)
- Ahmad Pejman (1935–2025)
- Borja Penalba (born 1975)
- Krzysztof Penderecki (1933–2020)
- Michael Penn (born 1958)
- Talip Peshkepia (born 1986)
- Heitor Pereira (born 1960)
- Frank Perkins (1908–1988)
- Coleridge-Taylor Perkinson (1932–2004)
- Jean-Jacques Perrey (1929–2016)
- Brendan Perry (born 1959)
- William P. Perry
- Joacim Persson (born 1971)
- Jean-Claude Petit
- Goffredo Petrassi (1904–2003)
- Sudhir Phadke (1919–2002)
- Phantom Planet
- Barrington Pheloung (1954–2019)
- Art Phillips
- Britta Phillips (born 1963)
- John Phillips (1935–2001)
- Stu Phillips (born 1929)
- Winifred Phillips
- The Phoenix Foundation
- Lucian Piane (born 1980)
- Ástor Piazzolla (1921–1992)
- Piero Piccioni (1921–2004)
- Stéphane Picq (1965–2025)
- Enrico Pieranunzi (born 1949)
- Franco Piersanti (born 1950)
- Jason Pierce (born 1965)
- Tom Pierson (born 1948)
- Nicholas Pike
- Pink Floyd
- Antonio Pinto
- Ernest Pintoff (1931–2002)
- Nicola Piovani (born 1946)
- Douglas Pipes (born 1962)
- Plaid
- Plan B (born 1983)
- Michael Richard Plowman (born 1965)
- Ego Plum (born 1975)
- Terry Plumeri (1945–2016)
- Dmitry Pokrass (1899–1978)
- Pier Paolo Polcari
- Basil Poledouris (1945–2006)
- Robert Pollard (born 1957)
- David Pomeranz (born 1951)
- Gillo Pontecorvo (1919–2006)
- Jocelyn Pook (born 1960)
- Popol Vuh
- Gavriil Nikolayevich Popov (1904–1972)
- Steve Porcaro (born 1957)
- Pornosonic
- Michel Portal (1935–2026)
- Cole Porter (1891–1964)
- Dave Porter
- Rachel Portman (born 1960)
- Mike Post (born 1944)
- E.S. Posthumus
- Oscar Potoker (1880–1935)
- Sally Potter (born 1949)
- Andrew Powell (born 1949)
- John Powell (born 1963) (Antz, The Road to El Dorado, Chicken Run, Shrek 1 and 5, Robots, Ice Age: The Meltdown, Dawn of the Dinosaurs and Continental Drift, Happy Feet 1 and 2, Horton Hears a Who, Kung Fu Panda 1 and 2, Bolt, How to Train Your Dragon, Mars Needs Moms, Rio 1 and 2, The Lorax, Ferdinand, Migration, Thelma the Unicorn, That Christmas, Minions & Monsters)
- Devi Sri Prasad (born 1979)
- Pray for Rain
- Zbigniew Preisner (born 1955)
- Don Preston (born 1932)
- André Previn (1929–2019)
- Dory Previn (1925–2012)
- Alan Price (born 1942)
- Andy Price
- Michael Price
- Prince (1958–2016)
- Robert Prince (1929–2007)
- Pritam (born 1971)
- Spencer Proffer (born 1948)
- Sergei Prokofiev (1891–1953)
- Craig Pruess (born 1950)
- Alec Puro (born 1975)

== Q ==
- Donald Quan
- Queen
- Quintessence

== R ==
- R.E.M.
- Jaan Rääts (1932–2020)
- Peer Raben (1940–2007)
- Trevor Rabin (born 1954)
- James Rado (1932–2022)
- Robert O. Ragland (1931–2012)
- A. R. Rahman (born 1967)
- Rajan–Nagendra
- David Raksin (1912–2004)
- Brian Ralston (born 1974)
- Ron Ramin
- Sid Ramin (1919–2019)
- S. Rajeswara Rao (1922–1999)
- Ernö Rapée (1891–1945)
- Joe Raposo (1937–1989)
- Eldon Rathburn (1916–2008)
- Roop Kumar Rathod (born 1959)
- François Rauber (1933–2003)
- Raveendran (1943–2005)
- Ravi (1926–2012)
- Simon Ravn (born 1974)
- Alan Rawsthorne (1905–1971)
- Satyajit Ray (1921–1992)
- Ray Reach (born 1948)
- Mike Reagan (born 1974)
- Alto Reed (1948–2020)
- Emil Reesen (1887–1964)
- Alan Reeves
- Mathias Rehfeldt (born 1986)
- Dirk Reichardt (born 1964)
- Bill Reichenbach Jr. (born 1949)
- Ernst Reijseger (born 1954)
- Niki Reiser (born 1958)
- Paul Reiser (born 1956)
- Brian Reitzell (born 1965)
- Franz Reizenstein (1911–1968)
- Joe Renzetti (born 1941)
- Mike Renzi (1941–2021)
- Himesh Reshammiya (born 1973)
- Dino Residbegovic (born 1975)
- The Residents
- Graeme Revell (born 1955)
- Gian Piero Reverberi (born 1939)
- Silvestre Revueltas (1899–1940)
- Graham Reynolds (born 1971)
- Trent Reznor (born 1965)
- Rheostatics
- Rick Rhodes (1951–2005)
- Andi Rianto (born 1972)
- Fred Rich (1898–1956)
- Neil Richardson (1930–2010)
- Max Richter (born 1966)
- Nelson Riddle (1921–1985)
- Stan Ridgway (born 1954)
- Kevin Riepl (born 1975)
- Hugo Riesenfeld (1879–1939)
- Diana Ringo (born 1992)
- Waldo de los Ríos (1934–1977)
- Stephen Rippy
- Laza Ristovski (1956–2007)
- Lolita Ritmanis (born 1962)
- Zacarías M. de la Riva (born 1972)
- Paul Robb (born 1963)
- Richard Robbins (1940–2012)
- Andy Roberts (born 1946)
- Jamie Robertson (born 1981)
- J. Peter Robinson (born 1945)
- Nile Rodgers (born 1952)
- Robert Rodriguez (born 1968)
- Heinz Eric Roemheld (1901–1985)
- Roger Roger (1911–1995)
- Shorty Rogers (1924–1994)
- Sonny Rollins (1930–2026)
- Alejandro Román (born 1971)
- Alain Romans (1905–1988)
- Douglas Romayne (born 1964)
- Sigmund Romberg (1887–1951)
- Philippe Rombi (born 1968)
- Manuel Romero (1891–1954)
- Paul Romero (born 1965)
- Jeff Rona (born 1957)
- Lior Ron (born 1982)
- Ann Ronell (1905–1993)
- David Rose (1910–1990)
- Earl Rose (born 1946)
- Leonard Rosenman (1924–2008)
- Laurence Rosenthal (born 1926)
- Roshan (1917–1967)
- Lior Rosner
- Atticus Ross (born 1968)
- Leopold Ross (born 1980)
- William Ross (born 1948)
- Renzo Rossellini (1908–1982)
- Hubert Rostaing (1918–1990)
- Nino Rota (1911–1979)
- Arnie Roth (born 1953)
- Judy Rothman (born 1962)
- Glen Roven (1957–2018)
- Hahn Rowe
- Bruce Rowland (1941–2015)
- Miklós Rózsa (1907–1995)
- Michael Rubin
- Michel Rubini (born 1942)
- Arthur B. Rubinstein (1938–2018)
- Donald Rubinstein (born 1952)
- John Rubinstein (born 1946)
- Harry Ruby (1895–1974)
- Steve Rucker (born 1949)
- Sandrine Rudaz
- Pete Rugolo (1915–2011)
- Mark Russell (born 1960)
- Jeff Russo (born 1969)
- Carlo Rustichelli (1916–2004)
- Paolo Rustichelli
- Mark Rutherford
- Alexey Rybnikov (born 1945)
- RZA (born 1969)

== S ==
- S.E.N.S.
- Haim Saban (born 1944)
- Danny Saber
- Emin Sabitoglu (1937–2000)
- Shigeaki Saegusa (born 1942)
- Craig Safan (born 1948)
- Jamie Saft
- Toshihiko Sahashi (born 1959)
- Camille Saint-Saëns (1835–1921)
- Ryuichi Sakamoto (1952–2023)
- Salim–Sulaiman
- Hans J. Salter (1896–1994)
- Michael Salvatori
- Leonard Salzedo (1921–2000)
- Adnan Sami (born 1971)
- George Sanger (born 1957)
- John Sangster (1928–1995)
- Stéphane Sanseverino (born 1961)
- Carlos Santana (born 1947)
- Gustavo Santaolalla (born 1951)
- Cláudio Santoro (1919–1989)
- Philippe Sarde (born 1948)
- David Sardy
- Eric Satie (1866–1925)
- Masaru Sato (1928–1999)
- Naoki Satō (born 1970)
- Tenpei Sato (born 1967)
- Jordi Savall (born 1941)
- Domenico Savino (1882–1973)
- Kan Sawada (born 1968)
- Nitin Sawhney
- Paul Sawtell (1906–1971)
- Walter Scharf (1910–2003)
- Glenn Schellenberg
- Victor Schertzinger (1888–1941)
- Peter Schickele (1935–2024)
- Lalo Schifrin (1932–2025)
- Adam Schlesinger (1967–2020)
- Glenn Schloss (born 1972)
- Irmin Schmidt (born 1937)
- Johannes Schmoelling (born 1950)
- Enjott Schneider (born 1950)
- Helge Schneider (born 1955)
- Alfred Schnittke (1934–1998)
- Gaili Schoen
- Arnold Schoenberg (1874–1951)
- Eberhard Schoener (born 1938)
- Schoolly D (born 1962)
- Scott Schreer (born 1953)
- Norbert Schultze (1911–2002)
- Klaus Schulze (1947–2022)
- Walter Schumann (1913–1958)
- Sigi Schwab (1940–2024)
- David Schwartz
- Stephen Schwartz (born 1948)
- Garry Schyman
- Gary S. Scott
- John Scott (born 1930)
- Tom Scott (born 1948)
- Vincent Scotto (1874–1952)
- Peter Sculthorpe (1929–2014)
- Humphrey Searle (1915–1982)
- Sebastian (born 1949)
- Sebastian (born 1981)
- Misha Segal (born 1943)
- Bernardo Segall (1911–1993)
- Mátyás Seiber (1905–1960)
- Mark Seibert
- Ilona Sekacz (born 1948)
- Tsuyoshi Sekito (born 1963)
- Bert Selen (born 1985)
- Jun Senoue (born 1970)
- Seppuku Paradigm
- Alex Seropian
- Éric Serra (born 1959)
- Arban Severin (born 1976)
- Steven Severin (born 1955)
- Kyriakos Sfetsas (born 1945)
- Marc Shaiman (born 1959)
- Vladimir Shainsky (1925–2017)
- Gingger Shankar
- Ravi Shankar (1920–2012)
- Ray Shanklin (1947–2015)
- Shantel (born 1968)
- Theodore Shapiro (born 1971)
- Jamshied Sharifi (born 1960)
- Shark
- Mani Sharma (born 1964)
- Monty Sharma (born 1970)
- Edward Shearmur (born 1966)
- Bert Shefter (1904–1999)
- Duncan Sheik (born 1969)
- William Sheller (born 1946)
- Richard M. Sherman (1928–2024)
- Robert B. Sherman (1925–2012)
- Tetsuya Shibata (born 1973)
- Leroy Shield (1893–1962)
- Kevin Shields (born 1963)
- Sumio Shiratori
- David Shire (born 1937)
- Sxip Shirey
- Shogakukan
- Howard Shore (born 1946)
- Ryan Shore (born 1974)
- Clinton Shorter (born 1971)
- Dmitri Shostakovich (1906–1975)
- Aadesh Shrivastava (1964–2015)
- Shudder to Think
- Leo Shuken (1906–1976)
- Mort Shuman (1938–1991)
- Louis Siciliano (born 1975)
- Steve Sidwell
- Valgeir Sigurðsson (born 1971)
- Kazimierz Sikorski (1895–1986)
- Carlo Siliotto (born 1950)
- Louis Silvers (1889–1954)
- Alan Silvestri (born 1950) - Back to the Future film series, Who Framed Roger Rabbit, Lilo & Stitch, The Polar Express, The Wild, Night at the Museum trilogy, The Croods.
- Samuel Sim
- Zoran Simjanović (1946–2021)
- Carly Simon (born 1943)
- Claudio Simonetti (born 1952)
- Rob Simonsen (born 1978)
- Madan Gopal Singh
- Uttam Singh (born 1948)
- 16Volt
- Lucijan Marija Škerjanc (1900–1973)
- Frank Skinner (1897–1968)
- Leland Sklar (born 1947)
- Andys Skordis (born 1983)
- Józef Skrzek (born 1948)
- Cezary Skubiszewski
- Wikluh Sky (born 1980)
- Michael Small (1939–2003)
- Bruce Smeaton (born 1938)
- Paul J. Smith (1906–1985)
- Mark Snow (1946–2025)
- Sofa Surfers
- Sohail Sen (born 1984)
- Martial Solal (1927–2024)
- Jason Solowsky (born 1977)
- Stephen Sondheim (1930–2021)
- Sonic Mayhem
- Warrick Sony (born 1958)
- Nicolás Sorín
- Pablo Sorozábal (1897–1988)
- Ondřej Soukup (born 1951)
- André Souris (1899–1970)
- JD Souther (1945–2024)
- Leonid Soybelman (born 1966)
- Stamatis Spanoudakis (born 1948)
- Benjamin Speed (born 1979)
- Sam Spence (1927–2016)
- Herbert W. Spencer (1905–1992)
- Carl Stalling (1891–1972)
- Stuart A. Staples (born 1965)
- Herman Stein (1915–2007)
- Ronald Stein (1930–1988)
- Fred Steiner (1923–2011)
- Max Steiner (1888–1971)
- Aage Stentoft (1914–1990)
- Stereo Total
- Liam Sternberg (born 1949)
- Cat Stevens (born 1948)
- Leith Stevens (1909–1970)
- Morton Stevens (1929–1991)
- David A. Stewart (born 1952)
- Diego Stocco
- Karlheinz Stockhausen (1928–2007)
- Robert Stolz (1880–1975)
- Richard Stone (1953–2001)
- Herbert Stothart (1885–1949)
- Patricia Lee Stotter
- Keith Strachan (born 1944)
- Matthew Strachan (1970–2021)
- Billy Straus
- Oscar Straus (1870–1954)
- John Strauss (1920–2011)
- Charles Strouse (1928–2025)
- Joe Strummer (1952–2002)
- Ike Stubblefield (1952–2021)
- Andy Sturmer (born 1965)
- Cong Su
- Dinesh Subasinghe (born 1979)
- Morton Subotnick (born 1933)
- Michael Suby
- Jeff Sudakin
- Harry Sukman (1912–1984)
- Andy Summers (born 1942)
- Sun City Girls
- Keiichi Suzuki (born 1951)
- Georgy Sviridov (1915–1998)
- Karel Svoboda (1938–2007)
- John Swihart
- Mola Sylla
- Władysław Szpilman (1911–2000)
- Shantanu Moitra (born 1968)

== T ==
- Mousse T. (born 1966)
- Germaine Tailleferre (1892–1983)
- Tōru Takemitsu (1930–1996)
- Tom Talbert (1924–2005)
- Joby Talbot (born 1971)
- Frédéric Talgorn (born 1961)
- David Tamkin (1906–1975)
- Tan Dun (born 1957)
- Kōhei Tanaka (born 1954)
- Tangerine Dream
- Mikael Tariverdiev (1931–1996)
- Brian Tarquin (born 1965)
- John Tavener (1944–2013)
- Michael Tavera (born 1961)
- Benson Taylor (born 1983)
- Mick Taylor (born 1949)
- Terry Scott Taylor (born 1950)
- Boris Tchaikovsky (1925–1996)
- Team Shanghai Alice
- Jeroen Tel (born 1972)
- Sébastien Tellier (born 1975)
- Bob Telson (born 1949)
- Jack Tempchin
- Tenacious D
- Tenmon (born 1971)
- Neil Tennant (born 1954)
- John Tesh (born 1952)
- Jeanine Tesori (born 1961)
- Francois Tetaz (born 1970)
- Alan Tew (1930–1997)
- Third Ear Band
- Mikis Theodorakis (1925–2021)
- They Might Be Giants
- Maurice Thiriet (1906–1972)
- Chance Thomas (born 1961)
- Pete Thomas
- Peter Thomas (1925–2020)
- Stuart Michael Thomas (born 1970)
- Virgil Thomson (1896–1989)
- Jon Mikl Thor
- Ken Thorne (1924–2014)
- Throbbing Gristle
- Billy Thorpe (1946–2007)
- Yann Tiersen (born 1970)
- Tôn-Thất Tiết
- Martin Tillman (born 1964)
- Chris Tilton (born 1979)
- Doug Timm (1960–1989)
- Christopher Tin (born 1976)
- Tindersticks
- Dimitri Tiomkin (1894–1979)
- George Tipton (1932–2016)
- Boris Tishchenko (1939–2010)
- Amon Tobin (born 1972)
- Ernst Toch (1887–1964)
- Pyotr Todorovsky (1925–2013)
- Richard Tognetti (born 1965)
- Magome Togoshi
- Tokyo Ska Paradise Orchestra
- James Tomalin
- tomandandy
- Tomatito (born 1958)
- Isao Tomita (1932–2016)
- Sheridan Tongue
- Pınar Toprak (born 1980)
- Veljo Tormis (1930–2017)
- David Torn (born 1953)
- Raúl de la Torre (1938–2010)
- Kazumi Totaka (born 1967)
- Toto
- Colin Towns (born 1948)
- Kazuhiko Toyama
- Jeff Toyne (born 1975)
- Goran Trajkoski (born 1963)
- Transcenders
- Joseph Trapanese (born 1984)
- Stephen Trask (born 1966)
- Armando Trovaioli (1917–2013)
- Amit Trivedi (born 1979)
- Paul Trust
- Andrzej Trzaskowski (1933–1998)
- Yuka Tsujiyoko
- Jonathan Tunick (born 1938)
- Tuxedomoon
- Tommy Tycho (1928–2013)
- Tom Tykwer (born 1965)
- Brian Tyler (born 1972)
- Jeff Tymoschuk (born 1974)
- Stephanie Tyrell (1949–2003)
- Steve Tyrell (born 1944)
- Christopher Tyng (born 1968)
- Gerald Tyrwhitt-Wilson, 14th Baron Berners (1883–1950)

== U ==
- Matt Uelmen (born 1972)
- Nobuo Uematsu (born 1959)
- Tatsuya Uemura (born 1960)
- Kōji Ueno (born 1960)
- Yoko Ueno (born 1960)
- Özkan Uğur (1953–2023)
- Shigeru Umebayashi (born 1951)
- Piero Umiliani (1926–2001)
- Underworld
- Christof Unterberger (born 1970)
- Jacques Urbont
- Vladimir Ussachevsky (1911–1990)
- Teo Usuelli (1920–2009)

== V ==
- Steve Vai (born 1960)
- Bebo Valdés (1918–2013)
- Gary Valenciano (born 1964)
- Frank Valentini (born 1962)
- Nils-Aslak Valkeapää (1943–2001)
- Jonne Valtonen (born 1976)
- David Vanacore
- Vangelis (1943–2022)
- Melvin Van Peebles (1932–2021)
- David Van Tieghem (born 1955)
- John Van Tongeren (born 1961)
- Henryk Wars (1902–1977)
- Ralph Vaughan Williams (1872–1958)
- Ben Vaughn
- John Veale (1922–2006)
- Eddie Vedder (born 1964)
- Herman van Veen (born 1945)
- Cris Velasco (born 1974)
- Caetano Veloso (born 1942)
- James L. Venable (born 1967)
- G K Venkatesh (1927–1993)
- S.P. Venkatesh (1955–2026)
- Stéphane Venne (1941–2025)
- Peter Vermeersch (born 1959)
- Vertexguy (born 1979)
- Mike Vickers (born 1940)
- Vidyasagar (born 1963)
- Tommy Vig (born 1938)
- Vishal Bhardwaj (born 1965)
- Emil Viklický (born 1948)
- Heitor Villa-Lobos (1887–1959)
- Dado Villa-Lobos (born 1965)
- Tony Vilgotsky (born 1980)
- Ramesh Vinayakam (born 1963)
- Carl Vine (born 1954)
- Anandji Virji Shah (born 1933)
- Kalyanji Virji Shah (1928–2000)
- Vishal–Shekhar
- M. S. Viswanathan (1928–2015)
- José María Vitier (born 1954)
- Roman Vlad (1919–2013)
- Tolis Voskopoulos (1940–2021)
- Neil D. Voss (born 1974)
- Richard Vreeland (born 1986)
- Chris Vrenna (born 1967)
- Henny Vrienten (1948–2022)
- Marius de Vries

== W ==
- Waddy Wachtel (born 1947)
- Kaoru Wada (born 1962)
- Derek Wadsworth (1939–2008)
- Loudon Wainwright III (born 1946)
- Tom Waits (born 1949)
- Rick Wakeman (born 1949)
- W. G. Snuffy Walden (born 1950)
- Mark Walk
- Scott Walker (1943–2019)
- Shirley Walker (1945–2006)
- Simon Walker (1961–2010)
- Jack Wall
- Benjamin Wallfisch (born 1979)
- Wallace Collection
- William Walton (1902–1983)
- Nathan Wang (born 1956)
- Wang Chung
- Wang Qiang (born 1935)
- Thomas Wanker
- War
- Stephen Warbeck (born 1953)
- Edward Ward (1900–1971)
- Kyle Ward
- Dean Wareham (born 1963)
- Régis Wargnier (born 1948)
- Diane Warren (born 1956)
- Mervyn Warren (born 1964)
- Henryk Wars
- Don Was (1902–1977)
- Ned Washington (1901–1976)
- Ron Wasserman (born 1961)
- Toshiyuki Watanabe (born 1955)
- Roger Waters (born 1943)
- Mark Watters (born 1955)
- Franz Waxman (1906–1967)
- Dwayne Wayans (born 1956)
- Jeff Wayne (born 1943)
- Brian Wayy
- Jimmy Webb (born 1946)
- Roy Webb (1888–1982)
- Konstantin Wecker (born 1947)
- Craig Wedren (born 1969)
- Mieczysław Weinberg (1919–1996)
- John Weinzweig (1913–2006)
- Edwin Wendler (born 1975)
- Wendy & Lisa
- Walter Werzowa (born 1960)
- Fred Wesley (born 1943)
- Bugge Wesseltoft (born 1964)
- Mel Wesson (born 1952)
- Nigel Westlake (born 1958)
- David Whitaker (1931–2012)
- Richard A. Whiting (1891–1938)
- Alec Wilder (1907–1980)
- Guy Whitmore
- David Whittaker (born 1957)
- George Whitty
- Frederik Wiedmann
- Zygmunt Wiehler (1890–1977)
- Clarence Wijewardena (1943–1996)
- Gert Wilden (1917–2015)
- Matthew Wilder (born 1953)
- George Wilkins (1934–2024)
- Steve Willaert
- Charles Williams (1893–1978)
- Jim Williams
- John Williams (born 1932) - Fiddler on the Roof, Jaws, Star Wars: A New Hope, Close Encounters of the Third Kind, Jaws 2, Superman (1978), The Empire Strikes Back, Indiana Jones: Raiders of the Lost Ark, E.T. The Extra-Terrestrial, Return of the Jedi, Indiana Jones and the Temple of Doom, Empire of the Sun, Indiana Jones and the Last Crusade, Home Alone, Hook, Far and Away, Jurassic Park, Schindler's List, Sabrina, Nixon, The Lost World: Jurassic Park, Seven Years in Tibet, Amistad, Saving Private Ryan, Star Wars: Episode I - The Phantom Menace, Angela's Ashes, The Patriot, A.I. Artificial Intelligence, Harry Potter and the Sorcerer's Stone, Star Wars: Episode II - Attack of the Clones, Minority Report, Harry Potter and the Chamber of Secrets, Catch Me If You Can, Harry Potter and the Prisoner of Azkaban, The Terminal, Star Wars: Episode III - Revenge of the Sith, War of the Worlds, Memoirs of a Geisha, Munich, War Horse, Lincoln, The Book Thief, Star Wars: The Force Awakens, The BFG, Star Wars: The Last Jedi, Solo: A Star Wars Story, Star Wars: The Rise of Skywalker, The Fabelmans
- Joseph Williams (born 1960)
- Patrick Williams (1939–2018)
- Paul Williams (born 1940)
- Timothy Williams (born 1966)
- Malcolm Williamson (1931–2003)
- Meredith Willson (1902–1984)
- Mortimer Wilson (1876–1932)
- Nancy Wilson (born 1954)
- Jamin Winans (born 1977)
- Sam Winans (born 1942)
- Herbert Windt (1894–1965)
- Jean Wiener (1896–1982)
- David Wise (born 1967)
- Debbie Wiseman (born 1963)
- Jozef van Wissem (born 1962)
- Charles Wolcott (1906–1987)
- Peter Wolf (born 1952)
- Richard Wolf
- Jonathan Wolff (born 1958)
- Byron Wong (born 1971)
- Christopher Wong
- Raymond Wong Ying-Wah (born 1968)
- Ronnie Wood (born 1947)
- Dan Wool
- John Wooldridge (1919–1958)
- Lyle Workman (born 1957)
- Tim Wright (born 1967)
- Allie Wrubel (1905–1973)
- Alex Wurman (born 1966)
- Robert Wyatt (born 1945)
- Bill Wyman (born 1936)
- Timothy Michael Wynn (born 1970)

== X ==
- Stavros Xarchakos (born 1939)
- Iannis Xenakis (1922–2001)
- Xian Xinghai (1905–1945)

== Y ==
- Shoji Yamashiro
- Akira Yamaoka (born 1968)
- Stomu Yamashta (born 1947)
- Yanni (born 1954)
- Gabriel Yared (born 1949)
- Eikichi Yazawa (born 1949)
- Peyman Yazdanian
- Wandly Yazid (1925–2005)
- Jack Yellen (1892–1991)
- Yello
- Narciso Yepes (1927–1997)
- Gary Yershon (born 1954)
- Michael Yezerski
- Yiruma (born 1978)
- Seiji Yokoyama (1935–2017)
- Yo La Tengo
- Yuji Yoshino
- Christopher Young (born 1958)
- Neil Young (born 1945)
- Victor Young (1899–1956)
- Yuvan Shankar Raja (born 1979)

== Z ==
- Michael Zager (born 1943)
- Dorin Liviu Zaharia (1944–1987)
- John Stepan Zamecnik (1872–1953)
- Geoff Zanelli (born 1974)
- Marcelo Zarvos (born 1969)
- Aleksandr Zatsepin (born 1926)
- Allan Zavod (1945–2016)
- Paul Zaza (born 1952)
- Denny Zeitlin (born 1938)
- Lev Zhurbin (born 1978)
- Aaron Zigman (born 1963)
- Winfried Zillig (1905–1963)
- Hans Zimmer (born 1957) – The Lion King, The Prince of Egypt, The Road to El Dorado, Spirit: Stallion of the Cimarron, Thunderbirds, Shark Tale, Madagascar, The Simpsons Movie, Kung Fu Panda, Megamind, Rango, The Little Prince, The Boss Baby, The SpongeBob Movie: Sponge on the Run, Pirates of the Caribbean: The Curse of the Black Pearl, Pirates of the Caribbean: Dead Man's Chest, Pirates of the Caribbean: At World's End, Pirates of the Caribbean: On Stranger Tides, Inception, Dune, Gladiator, The Last Samurai, Batman Begins, The Dark Knight & The Dark Knight Rises, Man of Steel, Interstellar, Dunkirk, No Time to Die, The Thin Red Line, Crimson Tide, Rain Man, Driving Miss Daisy, Thelma & Louise, A League of Their Own, Cool Runnings, Crimson Tide, Mission: Impossible 2, Black Hawk Down, Pearl Harbor, Hannibal, Matchstick Men, Spanglish, King Arthur, The Da Vinci Code, Frost/Nixon, Angels & Demons, Sherlock Holmes, The Lone Ranger, 12 Years a Slave, Winter's Tale, Blade Runner 2049, Top Gun: Maverick, Dune: Part Two, Mufasa: The Lion King
- Matteo Zingales (born 1980)
- Rob Zombie (born 1965)
- John Zorn (born 1953)
- Jeremy Zuckerman (born 1975)
- Inon Zur (born 1965)
- Ralph Zurmühle
- Josiah Zuro (1887–1930)
- Otto Zykan (1935–2006)
