= Stotter =

Stotter is a surname. Notable people with the surname include:

- David A. Stotter (1949–2016), British philatelist
- Patricia Lee Stotter, American composer, writer, and producer
- Rich Stotter (1945–2015), American football player
