= Rock Haven (film) =

- Theatrical release poster
- Directed by: David Lewis
- Produced by: David Lewis; David Wang; Jason Perez
- Starring: Sean Hoagland; Owen Alabado; Laura Jane Coles; Katheryn Hecht
- Cinematography: Christian Bruno
- Edited by: David Lewis
- Music by: Jack Curtis Dubowsky
- Distributed by: TLA Releasing
- Release dates: June 21, 2007 (San Francisco International Lesbian and Gay Film Festival)
- Country: United States
- Language: English

Rock Haven is a 2007 gay Christian-themed film directed by David Lewis and starring Sean Hoagland, Owen Alabado, Laura Jane Coles and Katheryn Hecht. The film was shot on location in San Francisco and Bodega Bay. The film is slowly paced, with numerous shots of the Northern California seascape.

== Plot ==
Brady is a devout Christian who has moved with his mother from Kansas to Rock Haven, California. Soon after arriving, he sees a boy and is instantly attracted to him. He later discovers that the boy is Clifford, the son of his next door neighbor. Clifford and Brady quickly become friends and hang out together. Brady is obviously uncomfortable around girls, so Clifford teaches him some moves that may help him out. During one such session, Clifford feels Brady's crotch; Brady jumps away, and Clifford teases him that he is aroused. Brady avoids Clifford for a while, but then starts hanging out with him again. A little while later, Clifford kisses him and Brady flees. He later confronts Clifford about the fact that he is gay and the two of them avoid each other.

In the meantime, Brady is being set up by his mother with Peggy, a Christian girl who realizes that Brady is gay. While Brady and Clifford are on the outs, Peggy asks Brady if he has boy troubles, which Brady angrily denies. Eventually, Brady goes back to see Clifford and the two of them start kissing. Brady flees, confused by what is happening to him and torn between his religious beliefs and his strong feelings. He decides to go with his feelings and eventually sleeps with Clifford.

Brady's mom knows something is wrong, but can't figure out what it is. The night that Clifford and Brady sleep together, Brady had told her that he was being driven to a church sleepover by Peggy. When he gets back the next day, she tells him that Peggy was in a car accident and confronts him about what is happening. He tells her that he is gay and she reacts badly and pressures him into breaking up with Clifford. She also gets Brady to go to a camp to "fix" him. Clifford is heartbroken and goes to join his dad in Barcelona, but not before asking Brady to reconsider. Brady says he can't, but then goes home to his mother and refuses to go to the camp. She insists that he is making the biggest mistake of his life and he says that he already has. He tells her that he knows she won't agree with him, but asks for her love, to which she responds that he is always her son. He forgives her for what has happened, then hugs her as she weeps in his arms. The movie ends with him saying that the pain has not ended, but he has never been closer to God.

== Cast ==
- Sean Hoagland as Brady
- Owen Alabado as Clifford
- Laura Jane Coles as Marty (Brady's mother)
- Katheryn Hecht as Angie (Clifford's mother)
- Erin Daly as Peggy
- David Lewis as Rev. Brown
- Johnny Yono as Doug
