= Michael Josephs (composer) =

American composer

Michael Josephs (born 1959) is an American film and television score composer. He was born in Cleveland, Ohio.

He has written and conducted musical scores for many notable films and television programs including Wild Kingdom, National Geographic, and many PBS specials.

He received a National Primetime Emmy Award nomination for Outstanding Main Title Theme Music in 2001. He has received numerous other awards.
