= October (soundtrack) =

2018 soundtrack album

Soundtrack album by Shantanu Moitra, Anupam Roy and Abhishek Arora
- Released: 28 March 2018
- Recorded: 2017–2018
- Studios: Hafod Mastering; Beatcrush; Sound Ideaz; New Edge
- Genre: Feature film soundtrack
- Length: 20:38
- Language: Hindi
- Label: Zee Music Company
External audio
- Official Audio Jukebox on YouTube

Singles from October
- 1. "October Theme" Released: 19 March 2018; 2. "Theher Ja" Released: 21 March 2018

October is the soundtrack album to the 2018 Bollywood film of the same name (October), directed by Shoojit Sircar. The album was composed by Shantanu Moitra, Anupam Roy, and Abhishek Arora and features playback singers such as Armaan Malik, Rahat Fateh Ali Khan, Sunidhi Chauhan and Monali Thakur. It was released on 28 March 2018 by Zee Music Company. The album consists of 5 tracks whose lyrics are penned by Swanand Kirkire, Tanveer Ghazi, and Abhiruchi Chand.

== Conception, development, and production ==
After hearing the film's script, Shantanu Moitra began composing the score in April 2017 Sircar's preoccupation with love and nature is among the factors which attracted Moitra to the project. Additionally, Moitra experimented with silence in the background score.

== Composition ==
Along with the score, Moitra also composed "October (Theme Music)", a violin-led instrumental track. In his own words, he was delighted that the theme was included in the album. He composed two more tracks. "Manwaa", penned by Moitra's frequent collaborator Swanand Kirkire. On comparing the composition of the song with his earlier composition "Naam Adaa Likhna" from the film Yahaan, Moitra said, "Earlier, at the time of Yahaan, there wasn't the pressure, but now, the thinking is that people won't listen to a song unless there is a groove of some kind, but I don't think so." "Chal", another song composed by Moitra, is an upbeat retro-funk track created with a "Nazia Hassan-like soundscape" in mind.

== Singles ==
"October Theme" and "There Ja" were first announced by Varun Dhawan on his official Twitter handle on 18 and 20 March 2018, and were released on 19 and 21 March 2018, respectively. The third song "Tab Bhi Tu" was also announced in a similar way on 26 March 2018, but was released on 28 March 2018, along with the album and included in it. An official promotional remix single "There Ja (DJ Notorious remix)" was released on 13 April 2018.

== Reception ==
Gaurang Chauhan of Times Now, in his review, noted that "October has quite a few good tunes" and gave it 3 1/2 stars. He appreciated the music and lyrics of other tracks but heavily criticized the track Tab Bhi Tu because it seemed "quite forced in its approach." Vipin Nair of The Hindu said that the film has got "… a decent soundtrack" and gave it a rating of 3/5 on his website. Debarati Sen from The Times of India said it is a "cerebral, creative" album and different from other Bollywood albums. She also added that the tracks are "delectable" and connected in a "subtle way" despite being different from each other.

== Track listing ==
Track listing
No.	Title	Lyrics	Music	Singer(s)	Length
1.	"Theher Ja"	Abhiruchi Chand	Abhishek Arora	Armaan Malik	2:41
2.	"October Theme"		Shantanu Moitra		3:11
3.	"Tab Bhi Tu"	Tanveer Ghazi	Anupam Roy	Rahat Fateh Ali Khan	5:26
4.	"Manwaa"	Swanand Kirkire	Shantanu Moitra	Sunidhi Chauhan	5:32
5.	"Chal"	Tanveer Ghazi	Shantanu Moitra	Monali Thakur	3:48
Total length:					20:38

Not included
No.	Title	Lyrics	Music	Singer(s)	Length
6.	"Theher Ja" (DJ Notorious remix)	Abhiruchi Chand	Abhishek Arora; DJ Notorious	Armaan Malik	3:34
Total length:					24:12

== Theher Ja ==
The video for the Armaan Malik version of "Theher Ja" was created by One Digital Entertainment. The video was released on 3 May 2018 through the official YouTube handle of the singer. Filmed inside a car and an amusement park, it features Armaan and his two friends depicting their road trip to Imagica.
