= Garish =

Austrian band

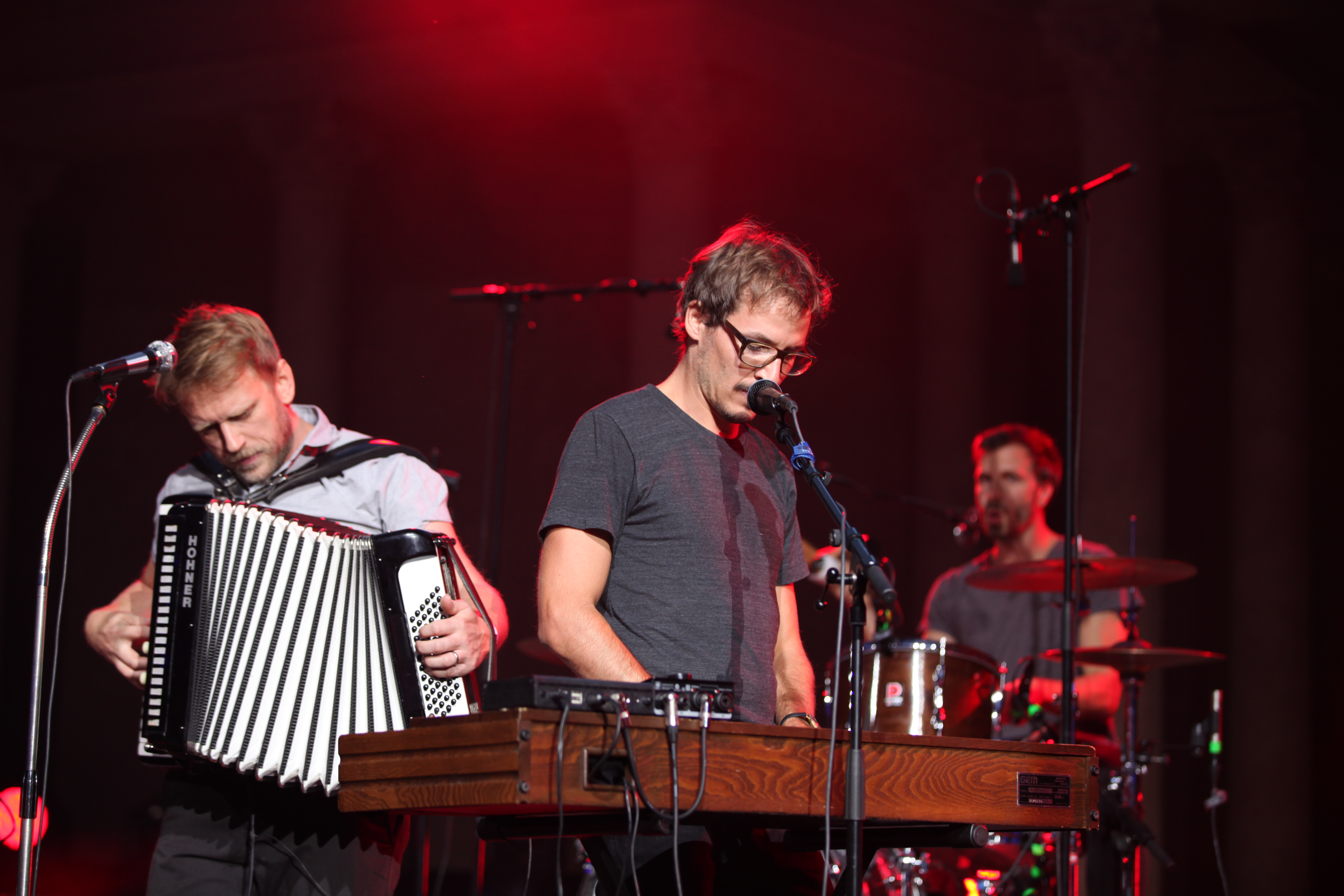
Garish at the Heimatsound-Festival 2015

Garish, formed in February 1997, is an Austrian alternative rock band. After having asserted themselves in the alternative scene inside and outside Austria's borders with their first two records amaurose pur. and wo die nacht erzaehlt vom tag, their third album Absender auf Achse gained favorable press and fan reaction.

The band was nominated for the Austrian music award "Amadeus" five times (2001, 2003, 2005, 2008 and 2010), but never won it.

The band's name is an English adjective meaning dazzling, stridently coloured or excessively ornamented, gaudy, ostentatious, tastelessly showy, tacky or in raucously poor taste.

Other music projects with garish' band members include "Polman Reisen" (Thomas Jarmer & Matthias Kertal), "Esteban's" (Christoph Jarmer), "...Auf Pomali" (Julian Schneeberger with others), "Bo Candy And His Broken Hearts" (Julian Schneeberger with others) and "The Beautiful Kantine Band" (Markus Perner; 2002 to 2007)

== Members ==
- Kurth Grath (bass, melodica, synthesizer, backing vocals *1980)
- Markus Perner (drums, percussion, piano *1980)
- Julian Schneeberger (guitars, banjo, percussion, glockenspiel, piano *1980)
- Thomas Jarmer (vocals, piano, accordion, acoustic guitar, e-guitar, keyboards, synthesizer, [toy] piano, banjo, percussion, hammond, glockenspiel, singing saw *27/04/1979)
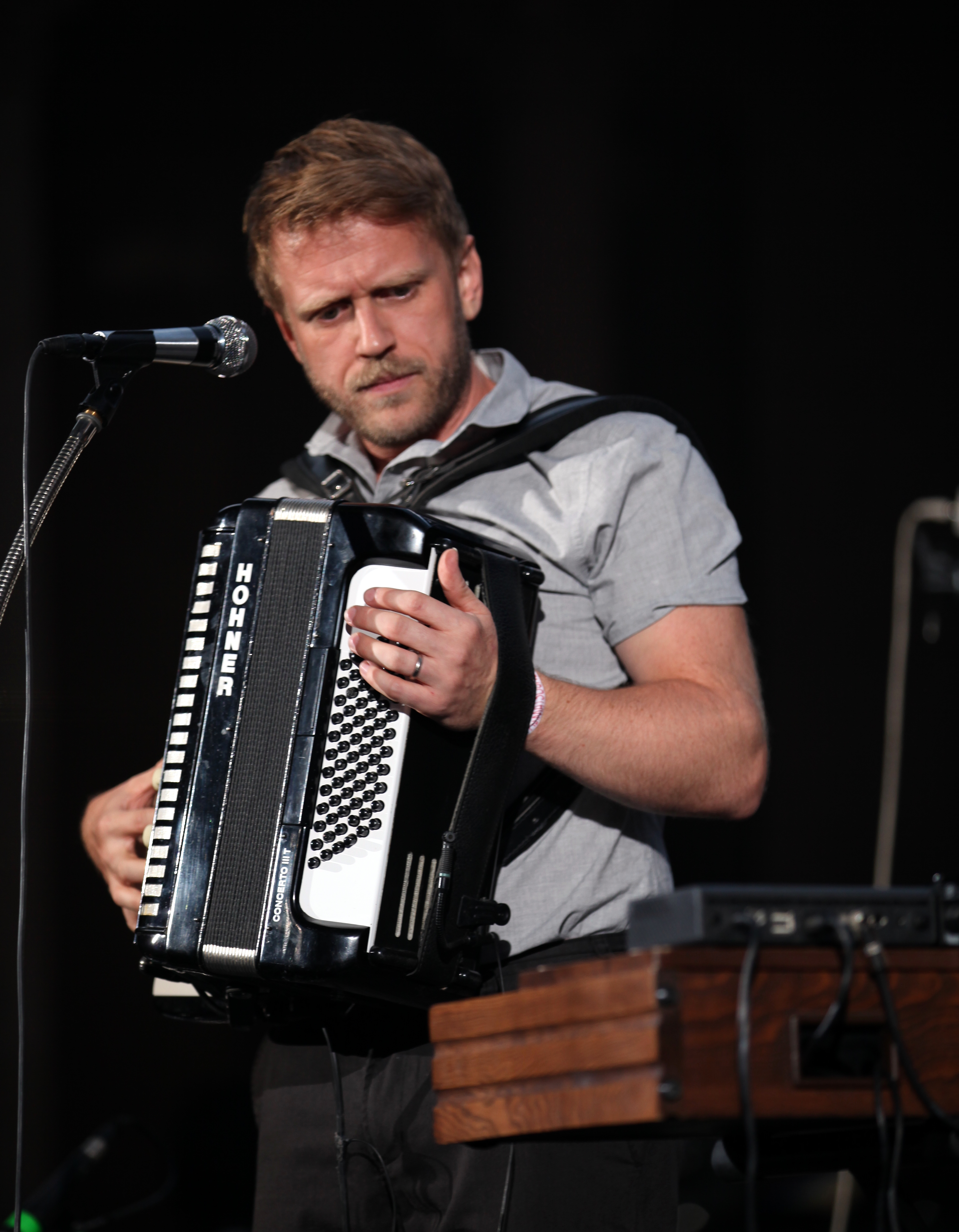
Thomas Jarmer

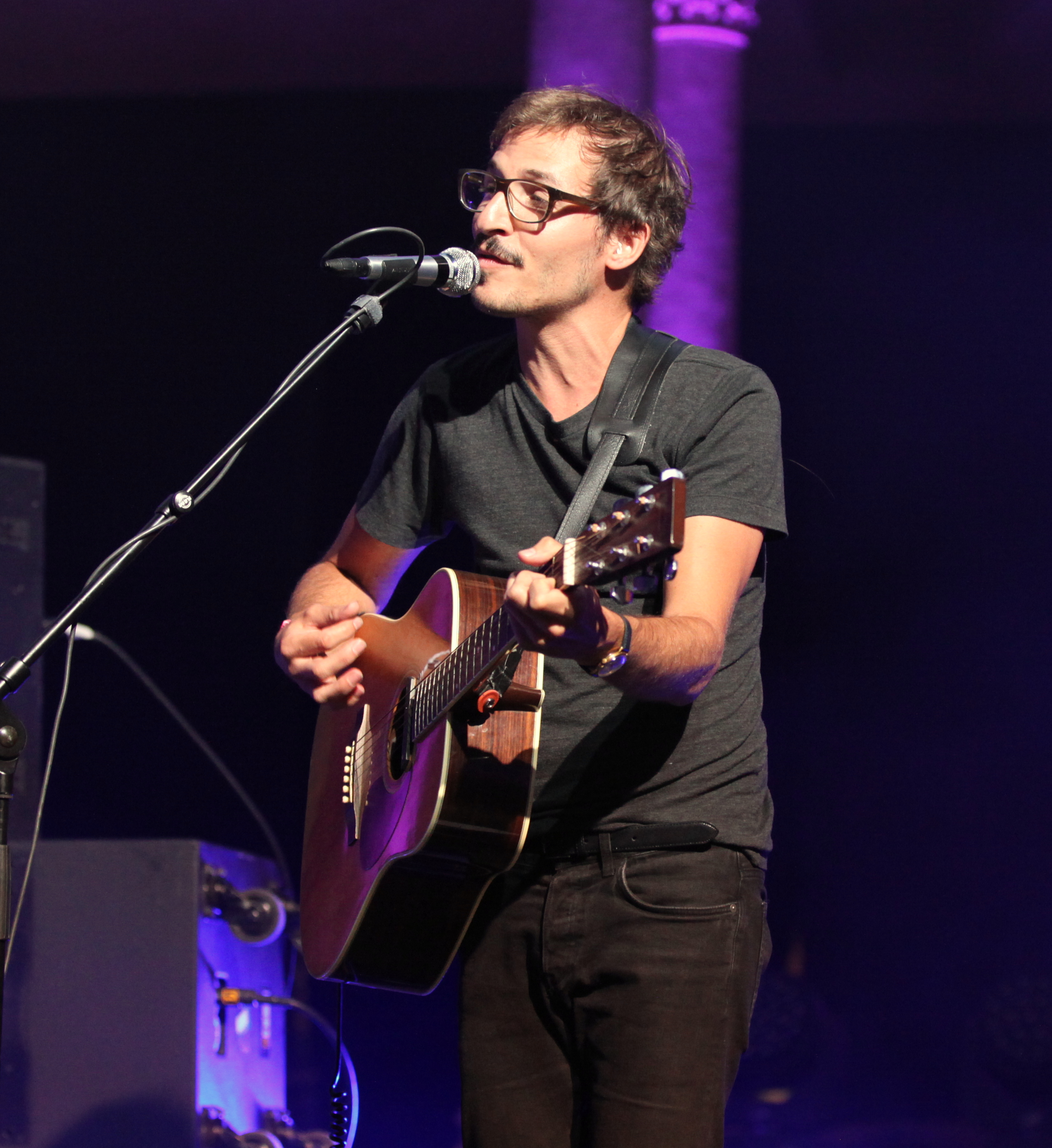
Julian Schneeberger

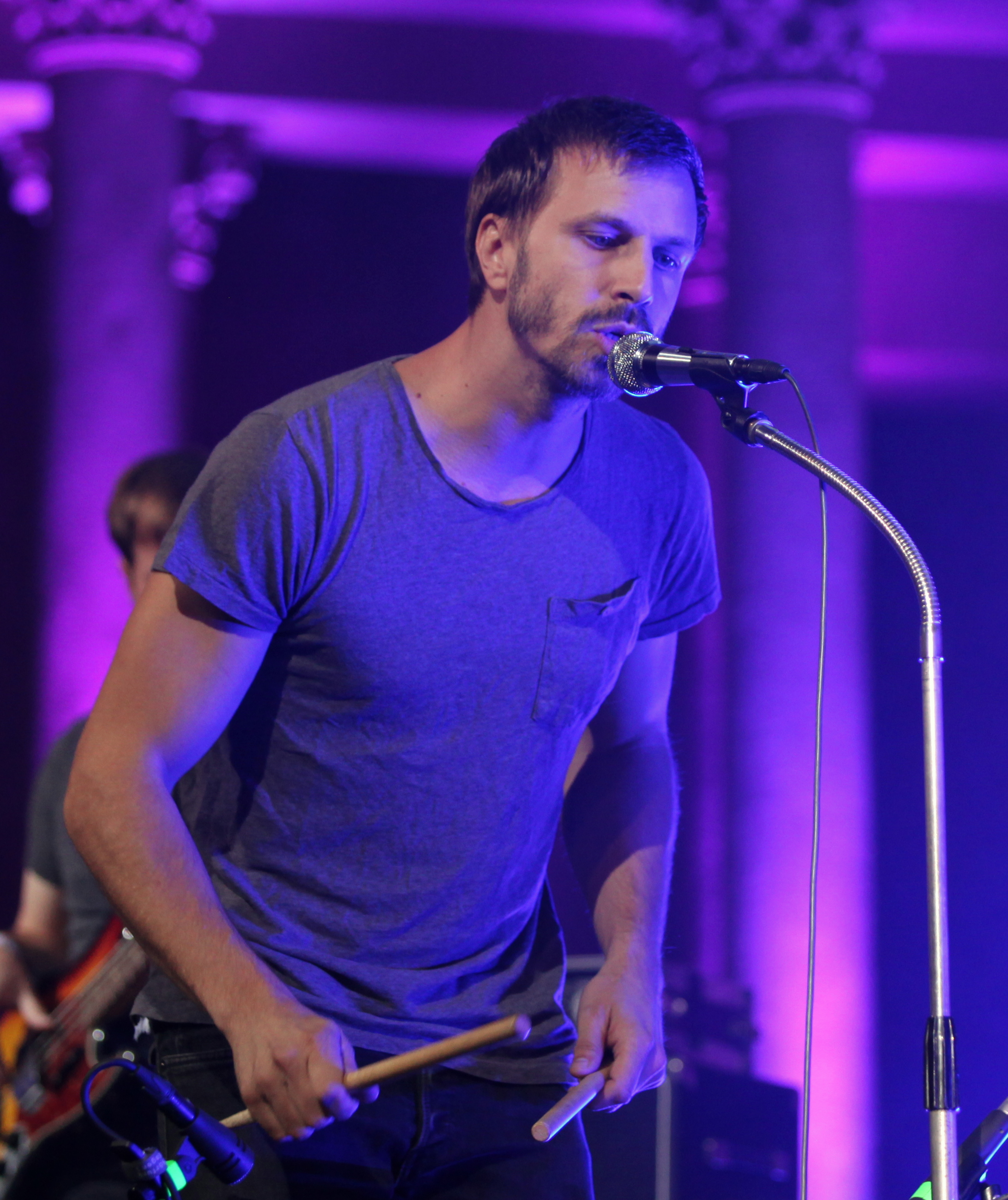
Markus Perner

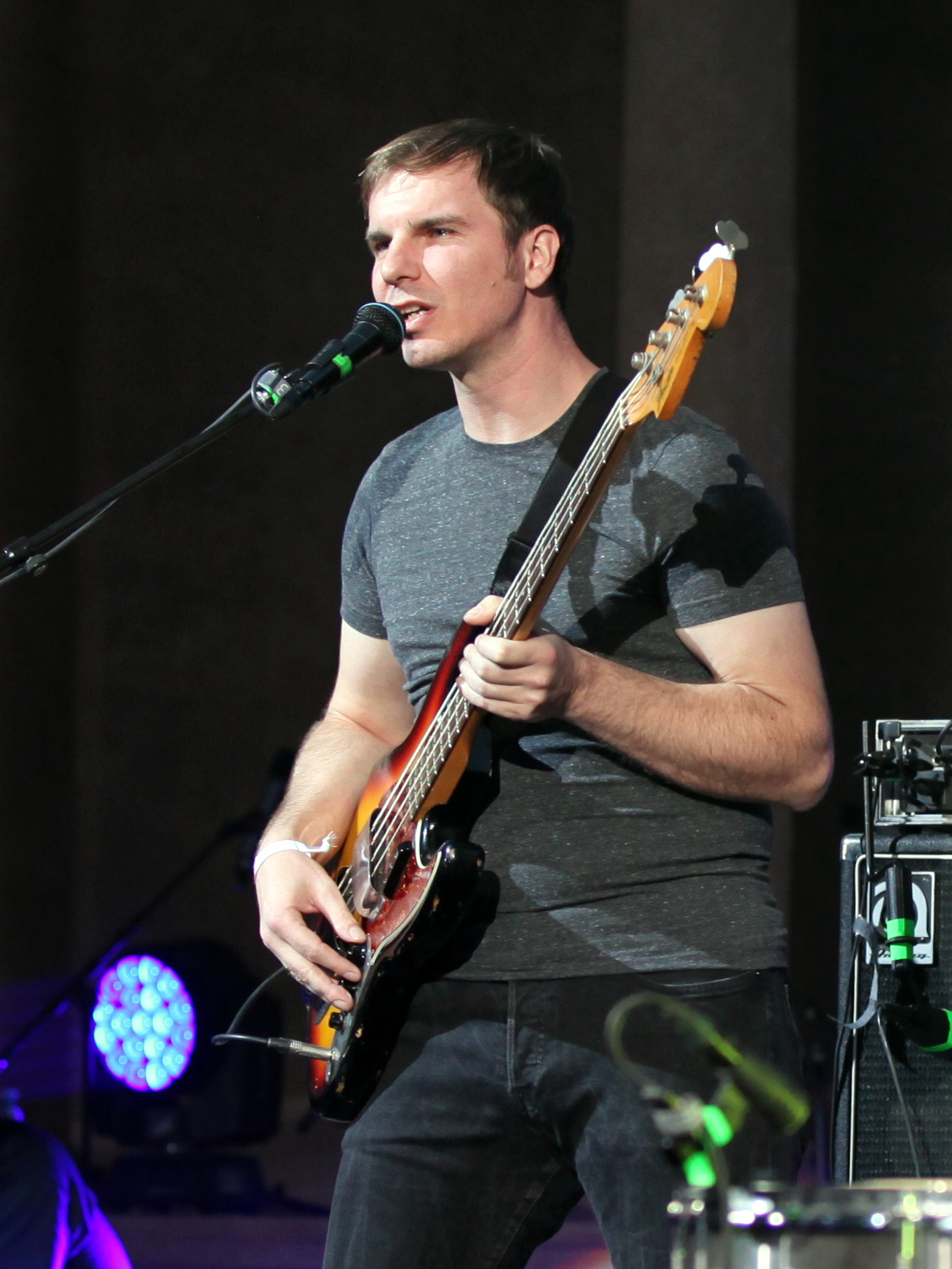
Kurt Grath

Former member:

- Christoph Gausch (hammond & live effects; August 2000 to April 2001)
- Christoph Jarmer (guitars, percussion, glockenspiel, rhodes, synthesizer *1981)

== Albums ==
- Amaurose pur. (2000)
- Wo die Nacht erzählt vom Tag (2002)
- Absender auf Achse (2004)
- Zu Gast im Studio 2 (Live album from a radio session; 2005)
- Tintenfischalarm (original soundtrack, 2006)
- Parade (2007)
- Wenn dir das meine Liebe nicht beweist (2010)
- Trumpf (2014)
- Komm schwarzer Kater (2017)
