= Patricia Lee Stotter =

American composer and writer

- Born: United States
- Occupation(s): Composer, Writer
- Years active: 1970s–present
- Notable work: Sesame Street; Unchained Memories; SERVICE: When Women Come Marching Home; Interplay
- Awards: Emmy Award; New York Emmy Award; American Cine Eagle; Apple Award; ASCAP Popular Awards; Sundance Film Festival; Tribeca Film Festival; Museum of Modern Art Film Festival

Patricia Lee Stotter is an American composer and writer.

== Television work ==
- Sesame Street
- HBO documentaries: Unchained Memories, Reading Your Heart Out, Sometimes I Feel, Three Sisters
- PBS documentaries: Service: When Women Come Marching Home, Spirit to Spirit, Discovering Women, Sugar
- Dramas on NBC, CBS and ABC

== Film work ==
- Interplay
- We Are All Prisoners
- Fatal Fandango
- Battlefield: Home
- SERVICE: When Women Come Marching Home www.servicethefilm.com
- Justice Denied
- Is Anybody Listening? www.paulajcaplan.net
- Suicide Notes
- Sea Women
- Dramatic Need
- The Salt Harvesters of Ghana
- Warriors Return marciarock.com/2013/11/12/warriors-return/
- Bankers Brain www.youtube.com
- From the Ashes
- Unfinished Business
- Funny
- Unchained Memories
- Best Friends:Sisterhood
- Dads and Daughters
- Painting the Town
- Spirit to Spirit
- "Starving for Sugar"

== Theatre ==
She has composed incidental music and full scores for over 50 plays and musicals including:

- "Carbondale Dreams"
- "Beef"
- "Resistance"
- Anna, the Gypsy Swede
- Threads
- Perfect Pitch

== Awards ==
- Emmy Award
- NY Emmy Award
- American Cine Eagle
- Apple Award
- ASCAP Popular Awards
- Sundance Film Festival
- Tribeca Film Festival
- Museum of Modern Art Film Festival
