= Kim Oler =

- Occupations: Television, film, theatre composer

Kim Oler is an American television and theatrical composer. He is a member of the BMI and Dramatists Guild.

== Positions held ==
- Composer on Little Women (2005) Pets!, When the Cookie Crumbles, The Secret Garden, Class Clown, Harriet the Spy and Babes in Toyland, All My Children, As the World Turns, The Tracey Ullman Show, and The Guiding Light.
- Orchestrator on The Hanoi Hilton (1987)

== Work with Alison Hubbard ==
Although composer Kim Oler and lyricist Alison Hubbard's songwriting work on the musical adaptation of Little Women won them a Richard Rodgers Development Award from the American Academy of Arts and Letters in 1998, the musical did not make it to Broadway. They left the show in April 2000, and began work on other musical theatre projects at the BMI Lehman Engel Musical Theatre Workshop in New York, including a musical version of Arthur Wing Pinero's The Enchanted Cottage with librettist Thomas Edward West. This musical was chosen for development in the National Association of Musical Theatre 2003 Festival of New Musicals in New York, and was subsequently produced at the Spirit of Broadway Theatre in Norwich, CT.

In 2003 Oler and Hubbard were asked by lyricist/librettist Sean Hartley, perhaps best known for his work on the musical Cupid and Psyche, to help him arrange a Spring concert with musical material from various winners of the Richard Rodgers Award. Hartley had been impressed by their songs from Little Women. Broadway producer turned-community theatre producer John Wulp listened to Oler and Hubbard's original songs, and asked for the two to put their version together with bookwriter Hartley. It was produced in Wulp's North Haven Island community/educational theatre, where it ran for sixteen performances in 2006. Kim Oler, Alison Hubbard and Sean Hartley's Little Women is published by Theatrical Rights Worldwide, and has been produced throughout the United States, in Canada and Australia.

After contacting Raymond de Felitta, the director/screenwriter of the 2000 independent film Two Family House, Oler and Hubbard worked on a musical version of the film, with de Felitta serving as the librettist. The musical, called Buddy's Tavern, was chosen for the 2004 ASCAP/Disney Workshop in New York City. It won the Richard Rodger's Development Award in 2010, was developed in the 2012 Eugene O'Neill Musical Theatre Conference in Waterford, CT, and received a production workshop at the York Theatre in New York in 2013, starring Alexander Gemignani and Laura Osnes.

== Awards and nominations ==
Kim Oler has been nominated for four Daytime Emmy awards in the category Outstanding achievement in Music Direction and Composition for a Drama Series—for his original solo piano music and underscoring work on All My Children. He was nominated from 2002 to 2008, and won twice in 2003 and 2005. His two Emmy Awards were shared with Terry Walker, A.J. Gundell, Jerry Pilato, Dominic Messinger, Gary Kuo, Mike Renzi, John Wineglass, Brian Comotto, Loris Holland, Robbie Kondor, Ron Goodman, Brian Tarquin, Peter Fish, and Jim Klein. Oler's work on AMC also won two BMI Television Music Awards in those same years.

Kim Oler, lyricist Alison Hubbard and librettist Allan Knee together won a Richard Rodgers award in 1998 for their musical Little Women. Oler and Hubbard won another Richard Rodgers Development Award in 2010 for Buddy's Tavern.

Kim Oler also won the 2002 BMI Jerry Harrington Award for Outstanding Creative Achievement in the Musical Theater for his work on the musical version of The Enchanted Cottage. The following year he won the BMI Foundation's Jerry Bock Award for Sustained Creative Achievement.
