= CalArts Center for New Performance =

Professional producing arm of the California Institute of the Arts

Coordinates: 34°23′35″N 118°34′01″W

The CalArts Center for New Performance (CNP) is the professional producing arm of the California Institute of the Arts.

Founded in 2002 by Susan Solt, Travis Preston, and Carol Bixler and launched with Travis Preston's groundbreaking all female production of King Lear, and originally called the CalArts Center for New Theater, the name was changed in 2005.

== Projects ==
| Title | Year | Creative team | Venue | Other performances |
|---|---|---|---|---|
| Etta and Ella on the Upper West Side | 2023 | By Adrienne Kennedy, Directed by Monty Cole | REDCAT, Los Angeles, CA | |
| Scene with Cranes | 2022 | By Octavio Solis, Directed by Chi-wang Yang | REDCAT, Los Angeles, CA | |
| rasgos asiáticos | 2020 | By Virginia Grise, Directed by Alexis Macnab, Installations Designed by Tanya Orellana | Automata, Los Angeles, CA | |
| El Camino Donde Nosotros Lloramos (The Road Where We Weep) | 2020 | Created by Lagartijas Tiradas al Sol | California Institute of the Arts, Valencia, CA | Festival Internacional de Teatro Universitario (FITU), Mexico City, MX |
| Finding Shelter | 2019 | Directed by Marissa Chibas | Segal Film Festival on Theatre and Performance, New York | Sotomayor High School for Science and Art, San Diego Latino Film Festival, Nevertheless, Film Festival, NewFilmmakers Los Angeles (NFMLA) Film Festival |
| HA-M-LET | 2019 | Created and Performed by Peter Mark, Presented in partnership with Hauser & Wirth | Hauser & Wirth, Los Angeles, CA | Gdansk Shakespeare Festival, Poland; Sibiu International Theater Festival, Romania |
| WITKACY / Two-Headed Calf | 2018/19 | Directed by Natalia Korczakowska, A collaboration with STUDIO teatrgaleria | Divine Comedy International Theatre Festival, Krakow, Poland | REDCAT, Los Angeles, CA |
| Nightwalk in the Chinese Garden | 2018 | Written and Directed by Stan Lai | The Huntington Library, Art Collections, and Botanical Gardens, Los Angeles, CA | |
| The Carolyn Bryant Project | 2018 | Created by Nataki Garrett & Andrea LeBlanc, Directed by Nataki Garrett | REDCAT, Los Angeles, CA | |
| El Acercamiento / The Approach | 2016-2018 | Conceived by Evelyn Serrano with Yamile Pardo | Ludwig Foundation, La Habana, Cuba | Fabrica de Arte Cubano (F.A.C.), La Habana; Centro Cultural Español, Miami; Plaza de la Raza, Los Angeles |
| Fore! | 2018 | Written by Aleshea Harris, Directed by Arnaud Meunier | La Comédie de Saint-Étienne, National Drama Center | Théâtre de la Ville, Paris; Théâtre National de Nice; Théâtre National de Bruxelles |
| The Hendrix Project | 2018 | Conceived and Directed by Roger Guenveur Smith, Developed in cooperation with Experience Hendrix, LLC | Under the Radar Festival, NYC | Segerstrom Center for the Arts, CA |
| Fantômas: Revenge of the Image | 2017 | Directed by Travis Preston, Developed in collaboration with Tom Gunning | Wuzhen Theatre Festival, China | |
| Shelter | 2016 | Directed by Martín Acosta, Written by Marissa Chibas | Plaza de la Raza, Los Angeles | John F. Kennedy Center for the Performing Arts, Washington D.C |
| The Institute of Memory (TIME) | 2015 | Created by Lars Jan/Early Morning Opera | REDCAT, Los Angeles, CA | |
| Prometheus Bound | 2013 | Directed by Travis Preston, Translation by Joel Agee, Composed by Ellen Reid and Vinny Golia, Choreographed by Mira Kingsley, Produced in association with Trans Arts and the Getty Museum | Getty Villa, Malibu, CA | |
| TEDxCalArts | 2013 | Speakers and Presenters included Guillermo Gómez-Peña, The Yes Men, Nora Chipaumire, Sardano W. Kusumo, Ricardo Dominguez, Ashley Hunt, Brian Massumi and Erin Manning, Mirjana Jokovic, Killsonic, Peggy Deamer, Chris Kallmyer, Douglas Kearney, Franco Beradi Bifo, Ajay Kapur, Jeepneys, Aleshea Harris | REDCAT, Los Angeles | |
| Timboctou | 2012 | Directed by Martín Acosta, Written by Alejandro Ricaño, In association with Duende CalArts | REDCAT, Los Angeles | •UDG Cultura Teatro Esperimental de Jalisco, Guadalajara, México |
| Brewsie and Willie | 2010 | Directed by Travis Preston, Written by Gertrude Stein, Adapted by Marissa Chibas, Erik Ehn and Travis Preston, Produced in association with Poor Dog Group | Los Angeles | •2011 RADAR LA Festival |
| Ah! | 2009 | Directed by Travis Preston in collaboration with Composer/Performer David Rosenboom and Poet Martine Bellen | REDCAT, Los Angeles | |
| Power Play and Willful Blindness | 2009 | Directed by Sarah Davies, Written by Margaret Heffernan, Produced in association with BBC Radio 4 | Aired June 2009, United Kingdom | |
| Smoke, Lilies and Jade | 2008/09 | Directed by Nataki Garrett, Written by Carl Hancock Rux, Choreographed by Colin Connor | California Institute of the Arts, Valencia | |
| Vineland Stalae | 2007/08 | Directed by Chi-wang Yang, Composed by Sandeep Bhagwati | REDCAT, Los Angeles | |
| Daughter of a Cuban Revolutionary | 2006/07 | Directed by Mira Kingsley, Written by Marissa Chibas | REDCAT, Los Angeles | •INTAR, New York •2008 William and Joan Lehman Theater, Miami (presented in Spanish and English) |
| What To Wear | 2006/07 | Written & Directed by Richard Foreman, Composed by Michael Gordon | REDCAT, Los Angeles | |
| Invisible Glass | 2004/05 | Directed by Janie Geiser, Written by Erik Ehn, Composed by Tom Recchion | REDCAT, Los Angeles | |
| Bell Solaris: Twelve Metamorphoses in Piano Theater | 2004/05 | Composed by David Rosenboom, Directed by Travis Preston | REDCAT, Los Angeles | |
| 11 September 2001 | 2004/05 | Directed by Robert Cantarella (National Dramatic Center of Dijon), Written by Michel Vinaver | REDCAT, Los Angeles | •2006 Théâtre de Colline, Paris •2006 Frictions Festival of Théâtre Dijon Bourgogne, France •Center Dramatique National de Montpellier, France |
| Macbeth (A Modern Ecstasy) | 2004/05 | Performed by Stephen Dillane, Directed by Travis Preston, Composed by Vinny Golia | REDCAT, Los Angeles | •2005 Almeida Theatre, London •2006 Adelaide Festival, Australia •2006 Sydney Theatre, Australia |
| Peach Blossom Fan | 2003/04 | Directed by Chen Shi-Zheng, Written by Edward Mast, Composed by Stephin Merritt, Guest artists Jon David Casey, David Patrick Kelly and Beijing Opera star Zhou Long | REDCAT, Los Angeles | |
| King Lear | 2002/03 | Directed by Travis Preston | The Brewery, Los Angeles | •2003 Frictions Festival of Théâtre Dijon Bourgogne, France |
| Listen To Me | 2000 | Created by visual artist Michael Counts and choreographer Ken Roht | | |
| Bad Behavior | 1999 | Richard Foreman and Sophie Havilad | California Institute of the Arts, Valencia | |
| Theater of the Ears | 1999 | Zaven Paré, Gregory Whitehead, Valère Novarina and Allen S. Weiss | 2000 Henson International Festival of Puppet Theatre, New York | •Biennale Internationale des Arts de la Marionnette, Paris •2001 Festival d’Avignon, Paris |

== Leadership ==
- Travis Preston, Founding Artistic Director
- Marissa Chibás, Director of Duende CalArts; Producing Artist
- Daniel Alexander Jones, Producing Artist
- Amanda Shank, Associate Artistic Director
- Chi-wang Yang, Associate Artistic Director
- Paul Turbiak, Director of Communications
- Rui Xu, Producer
- George Lugg, Consulting Producer

== Awards ==
King Lear (2003)

- Three NAACP awards including Best Performance by a Female for Fran Bennett as King Lear, Best Production and Best Lighting Design
- Five LA Ovation Award Nominations

2011 MetLife/TCG A-Ha! Program grant recipient
