= Virginia Grise =

American playwright and director

Virginia Grise (born June 27, 1976, in Ft. Gordon, Georgia) is a playwright and director. Grise's most recognized work is blu (Yale University Press), the winner of the 2010 Yale Drama Series Award and a finalist for the Kennedy Center for the Performing Arts' Latino/a Playwrighting Award. In addition, Grise is the co-writer of The Panza Monologues (University of Texas Press) with Irma Mayorga, and edited a volume of Zapatista communiqués called Conversations with Don Durito (Atonomedia Press). She is also a recipient of the Whiting Writers' Award and the Princess Grace Award in Theater Directing.

== Early life and education ==
Grise grew up in San Antonio, Texas. Her father, Ronald Grise is from Goshen, Indiana and her mother, Emma Lesi Grise (née Yee) is from Monterrey, Mexico. Her maternal grandfather Manuel Yee was from Canton, China.

In 1998 Grise received her Bachelor of Arts (B.A.) in History and Spanish with a minor in Chicano Studies from the University of Texas at Austin. Grise also studied critical pedagogy and second language acquisition at the University of Texas and also earned her teaching certificate to teach English and Spanish as a secondary language. Grise has more than 15 years of teaching experience.

In 2009, she received her Master of Fine Arts (MFA) in Writing for Performance from California Institute of the Arts. Her play blu, was developed at Cal Arts as her MFA thesis project under the mentorship of Carl Hancock Rux. Grise at the time was living in Boyle Heights and said, "every time I saw or heard helicopters I wrote a poem." These poems eventually transformed into the play blu, which is about a Chicano family (raised by two queer women) that tries to envision a life and sky free of police and helicopters. Themes in blu are prison, war, state violence and desire.

== Career ==
While teaching in Austin, Texas, Grise coordinated a series of writing workshop at the Travis County Juvenile Detention Center and Austin High School with La Peña Cultural Arts Center and Resistencia Bookstore. At the request of one of the students in the program, Grise read her first poem publicly at the juvenile detention center and later went on to study writing with Bridgforth. In addition to working with Bridgforth, Grise was a member of the Austin Project produced by Omi Osun and Joni Jones from 2003 to 2006. As a member of The Austin Project, she was introduced to experimental artists such as Erik Ehn, Robbie McCauley, Laurie Carlos, Daniel Alexander Jones and Carl Hancock Rux.

Grise has also been a guest lecturer and held writing workshops. In 2012, Grise served as a Visiting Writer in the Department of English and Literature at Pitzer College in Claremont, CA. She has been invited to share her works at universities including University of Southern California, Vassar College, Brown University, and Cornell University, to name a few

== Activism ==
Grise began activism as a teenager as being part of the Brady Greene Teen Advisory Board, where she taught sexuality education classes in local high schools. She was also a founding member of Acción Zapatista, an organization in Austin, Texas, committed to spreading history of the Zapatistas (Mexican Revolution), and other pro-Democracy movements in Mexico. As a member of Acción Zapatista, Grise served as an international peace observer in Chiapas, Mexico and organized protests, community forums, and attended the Intercontinental Encuentro Against Neo-Liberalism.

Grise was also a writing, directing, performing and founding member of Teatro Callejero, at the Esperanza Peace and Justice Center in San Antonio, Texas. The street theatre created performances around important issues affecting the city of Austin such as environmental racism and gentrification.

And as a middle school teacher at Kazen Middle School in San Antonio, Texas, Grise was an organizing member of Books in Barrio, a grassroots organization that successfully launched a campaign to locate a bookstore in a predominantly Mexican and working class community on the South Side of San Antonio.

Currently, she works with prison abolitionists and community organizations that are teaching inside women's prisons.

== Awards and honors ==
- National New Play Network Commission, 2015
- Finalist, American Studies Association's Gloria Anzaldua Prize for Independent Scholars, 2015
- Whiting Writers' Award, 2013
- Loft Literary Center Spoken Word Immersion Fellowship, 2013
- Women's Project Theater's Playwrights Lab, 2012
- Pregones Theater's Asuncion Queer Playwriting Award, 2011
- Yale Drama Series Award, 2010
- Princess Grace Foundation's Pierre Cardin Theater Award in Directing, 2010
- Finalist, LARK's Playwrights of New York (PONY) Award, 2010
- Finalist, Princess Grace Foundation's Playwriting Award, 2010
- Contemporary Arts Month Award, San Antonio, Texas, 2010
- Playwrights Center's Jerome Fellowship, 2009
- Finalist, Kennedy Center American College Theater Festival, Latino/a Playwriting Award, 2009
- Artist in Residence, ALLGO, Austin, Texas, 2004
- National Endowment for the Humanities Fellowship, Teaching Spanish to Native Speakers, 1999
- National Association for Chicana/o Studies Student Premio, 1994

== Works ==
=== Books ===
1. The Panza Monologues, Second Edition (2014)
2. blu (2011)
3. Conversations with Don Durito: The Story of Durito and the Defeat of Neo-Liberalism (Editor, 2005)
4. The Panza Monologies (2004)

=== Anthologies ===
1. Monologues for Latino/a Actors (Contributor, 2014)
2. Experiments in a Jazz Aesthetic: Art, Activism, Academics and the Austin Project (Contributor, 2010)
3. Gender on the Borderlands, Frontier: Journal of Women Studies (Contributor, 2004)
4. Voices for Racial Justice (Contributor, 2004)

=== Plays ===
1. Siempre Norteada: Always Late, Always Lost (2014)
2. Making Myth (2013-Whiting Award)
3. blu (2010-Yale Drama Series Award)
4. rasgos asiaticos (2011-Asuncion Queer Playwrighting Award)
5. The Mexican as Told by Us Mexicans (2012-Collaborative project with playwright Ricardo A. Bracho)
6. behind barbed wire (2009-Commissioned by the Community Arts Partnership)
7. a farm for meme

=== Performance installations/ Site-specific work ===
1. flesh and bone, and from the Earth's body: how do you pull your own sadness up from the ground? (Commissioned by Luminaria Contemporary Arts Festival, in collaboration with Rafa Esperanza and Joe Jimenez)
2. Barrio Stories (Commissioned by Borderlands Theater, in collaboration with Elaine Romero and Martin Zimmerman)
3. ponme la mano aqui
4. i was born here
5. Remember el Alma (Commissioned by Bihl Haus Arts)
6. Teatro Callejero (founding member)

=== Dance theater ===
1. would i then be... (Commissioned by Nugent Dance)
2. Passions (Commissioned by Nugent Dance)
3. held by dreams (Commissioned by Nugent Dance)

=== Short plays ===
1. Teatro Organico (2014)
2. Right to Remain (2014)
3. Call to Prayer (2014)
4. ESL (2014)
5. Sha-Hell-No (2014)
6. Death sounds like... (2014)
7. corn does not grow in the museum (2013)
8. woman in the walnut creek turned butterfly (2013)
9. flower offering for lil girls who ride buses (2013)
