= Travis Preston =

American director and theater artist (born 1963)

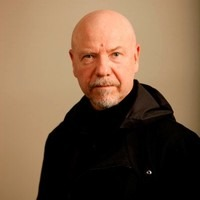
- Born: September 20, 1963 (age 62); East Chicago, Indiana
- Education: Yale School of Drama
- Known for: Visual/Theater Artist, Performance Art
- Awards: Ordre des Arts et des Lettres – Chevalier of the Order of Arts and Letters; 2008 Contributions to the arts in France and throughout the world – Director Best Opera production in Germany – Opern Welt; 1999 Al Gran Sole Carico d’Amore – Director Best Opera Production Citation – Scandinavian Press Society; 1996 Lulu – Director
- Website: Travis Preston Official Website

Travis Preston (born September 20, 1963) is an internationally celebrated director of theater and opera. He is the Founding Artistic Director of CalArts Center for New Performance, the Executive Director of Three Friends/One Spirit, and the former Dean of the CalArts School of Theater. His many productions include Macbeth with Stephen Dillane at the Almeida Theatre in London and the Sydney and Adelaide Festivals in Australia, Prometheus Bound with Ron Cephas Jones at the Getty Villa, The Master Builder at the Almeida Theater (with Stephen Dillane and Gemma Arterton), Al gran sole carico d'amore at the Hamburg State Opera, the world premiere of Fantomas: Revenge of the Image at the Wuzhen Theatre Festival, the world premiere of Augustine Machine by Marie Darrieussecq in Paris, as well as the opening gala performance at Daniel Libeskind’s Jewish Museum in Berlin. In 2022, he was named to the Artistic Committee of the Wuzhen Theatre Festival in China.

Upcoming projects include the world premiere of K City at the Hong Kong Repertory Theatre and the world premiere of the opera American Mother in Germany, composed by Charlotte Bray with a libretto by Colum McCann.

== Background ==
Preston was born in September 1963 in East Chicago, Indiana. He applied for Yale School of Drama while working on his Ph.D. in psychology Indiana University. He began his career by directing Aeschylus' Prometheus Bound in 1980 at Wrocławski Teatr Współczesny in Poland.

Much of Preston's early career intersected with Polish Theater. He studied with Jerzy Grotowski at the Teatr Laboratorium in Wroclaw, where he also worked with dramaturg Ludwig Flaszen and trained with Grotowski actors Ryszard Cieslak, Zygmunt Molik, and Rena Mirecka, studying the method of physical actions, plastiques and corporals. Preston spent time with Grotowski on the Mountain Project in the Polish forest. While in Poland Preston was also introduced to the work of Tadeusz Kantor and Józef Szajna.

At Yale, Preston was the assistant of the celebrated Polish film and theater director Andrzej Wajda on a production of White Marriage by Tadeusz Różewicz at the Yale Repertory Theatre. While at Yale Preston was the first student selected to direct at the Yale Rep, a world premiere production of Terra Nova, by Ted Tally.

Preston joined Robert Brustein for the founding of the American Repertory Theatre at Harvard, where he served as Associate Artist until 1990. During this period Preston focused on directing modern classics: O'Neill (Mourning Becomes Electra), Strindberg (The Ghost Sonata), Chekhov (The Seagull), and several celebrated productions of plays by Henrik Ibsen, including A Doll's House, Ghosts, and Little Eyolf at the American Ibsen Theater in Pittsburgh, of which he was one of the founding members. Significant productions included the American Premiere of The Sleep of Reason by Antonio Buero-Vallejo at Baltimore's Center Stage, The Balcony at the Hong Kong Repertory Theatre, and the American premiere of Bernard-Marie Koltès' Roberto Zucco in New York.

== Career ==
In 2017, Preston directed Fantômas: Revenge of the Image and staged it at the Wuzhen Theatre Festival in China. He also directed and produced Sam Shepard's Buried Child for the Hong Kong Repertory Theatre.

In 2013, Preston revisited Aeschylus' Prometheus Bound, staging it at the Getty Villa at the Barbara and Lawrence Fleischman Outdoor Amphitheater. The performance featured Emmy award winner Ron Cephas Jones in the role of Prometheus, and Mirjana Joković as Io. For the play, he and set designer Efren Delgadillo Jr, employed a 23-foot-tall rotating steel wheel symbolizing time and representing the protagonist being bound to a mountaintop, as per the Greek tragedy.

Preston was appointed as the Dean of the CalArts School of Theater in August 2010. In the same year, he directed Ibsen's The Master Builder at the Almeida Theatre in London, starring Gemma Arterton and Stephen Dillane.

In 2005, Preston directed Stephen Dillane in the popular Shakespeare tragedy Macbeth (A Modern Ecstasy). In the play, he explored the inner landscape of Macbeth's soul and staged this one performer drama in a minimalist set at REDCAT in Disney Hall. The play was also performed at the Almeida Theatre in London and at the Sydney and Adelaide Festivals in Australia.

Preston has been teaching faculty at universities and theater training programs including SUNY Purchase College, The Yale School of Drama, New York University, the National Theater School of Denmark, Indiana University, Hong Kong Academy for the Performing Arts, and ACT at Harvard University.

Travis Preston's employment at CalArts ended 2024.

== Devised work ==
Preston began applying his work on classic texts and text-based methods to devising projects derived from various sources in rehearsal. Using the physical/gestural techniques he developed as a basis, Preston devised a wide-ranging series of works that expanded the discourse and practice of contemporary performance creation. These included Paradise Bound: Part II, a spectacle with 100 performers mounted at the Central Park bandshell in New York that involved a chorus of boom boxes “conducted” in an urban ritual of radio cacophony; Woyzeck/Nosferatu (Samuel Beckett Theater, NYC), a meditation on silent cinema and hypnosis; Apocrypha at Cucaracha in New York in 1995, an oratorio based on the Gnostic Gospels: Democracy in America, based on Alexis de Tocqueville's work of the same name, created together with Colette Brooks for the Yale Repertory Theatre.

== Opera ==
As part of Copenhagen's activities as Cultural City of Europe, Travis Preston directed Lulu by Alban Berg - a co-operation between the Danish National Symphony, the Lille Grønnegåde Theater, and the royal family of Denmark, performed in the Queen's riding stables of Christiansborg Palace. This began a series of opera works: Luigi Nono's Al gran sole carico d'amore and Boris Godunov at the Hamburg State Opera, Don Pasquale, Falstaff, Don Giovanni, Semiramide, The Pearl Fishers, and Saul and the Witch of Endor at Opera at the Academy in New York. He directed the opening performance gala at Daniel Libeskind's Jewish Museum in Berlin.

== Recognition ==
In 2006, Preston was awarded Chevalier of the Order of Arts and Letters by the French Minister of Culture.
