= Ron Cephas Jones =

American actor (1957–2023)

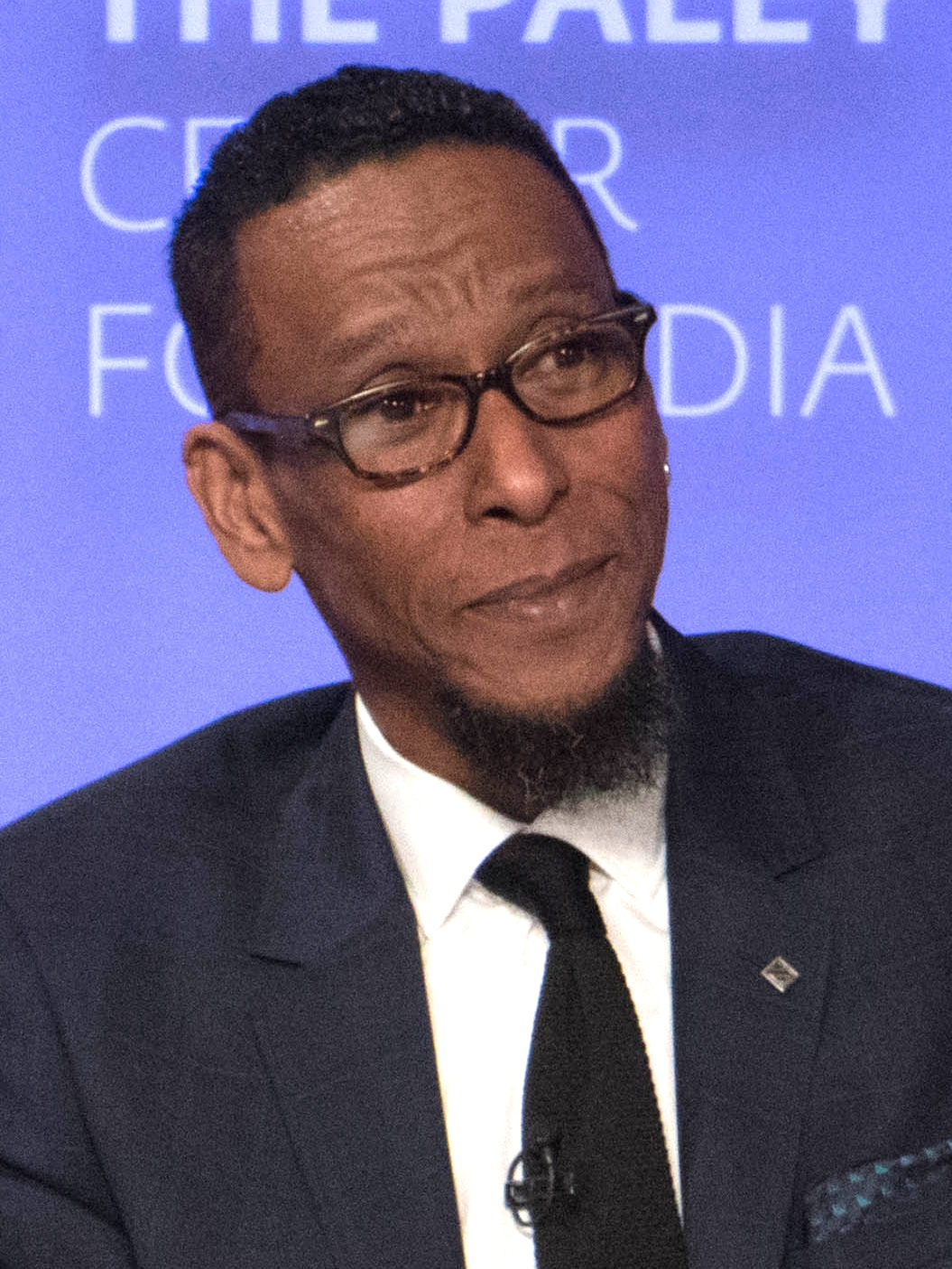
- Jones in 2017
- Born: January 8, 1957; Paterson, New Jersey, U.S.
- Died: August 19, 2023 (aged 66)
- Other name: Ron C. Jones
- Education: Ramapo College
- Occupation: Actor
- Years active: 1977–2023
- Children: Jasmine Cephas Jones

Ron Cephas Jones (/ˈsiːfəs/; January 8, 1957 – August 19, 2023) was an American actor, best known for his role as William Hill in the drama series This Is Us (2016–2022), which earned him a Screen Actors Guild Award; along with four consecutive Primetime Emmy Award nominations, winning twice for Outstanding Guest Actor in a Drama Series in 2018 and 2020.

Jones appeared in television series such as Mr. Robot (2015–2016), The Get Down (2016–2017), Luke Cage (2016–2018), and Truth Be Told (2019–2023). He also appeared in a number of films, including Paid In Full (2002) Half Nelson (2006), Across the Universe (2007), Glass Chin (2014), The Holiday Calendar (2018), Dog Days (2018), and Dolemite Is My Name (2019).

In 2022, he was nominated for Best Performance by a Featured Actor in a Play at the 75th Tony Awards, for his performance in the Broadway play Clyde's.

== Early life and education ==
Ron Cephas Jones, who was of African American heritage, was born on January 8, 1957.

He grew up in Paterson, New Jersey. He attended John F. Kennedy High School and then Ramapo College. While at Ramapo, Jones had originally intended to study jazz under director Arnold Jones (no relation), but changed majors to theater after getting the lead in a production of Cinderella Ever After his sophomore year. He graduated from Ramapo in 1978.

After graduation he moved to Los Angeles, California and drove a bus for the Southern California Rapid Transit District for the following four years. He then moved around for some years, living in San Francisco, Arizona, and New Orleans, before returning to New York City in 1985.

== Career ==
After returning to New York in 1985, Jones began spending time at the Nuyorican Poets Café in Manhattan's East Village. During that time, he performed in a play based on the Billie Holiday song "Don't Explain". His performance caught the attention of a casting director, which led to Jones being offered the lead role in the Tazewell Thompson production of the Cheryl West play Holiday Heart in 1994. Jones performed in several theatrical productions with the Steppenwolf Theatre Company in Chicago, Illinois; appeared as the title character of Shakespeare's Richard III with The Public Theater in New York City, New York, as well as other Off Broadway productions. Jones served as an understudy or standby in several Broadway theatre productions. In 2014 Jones starred as Prometheus in Prometheus Bound directed by Travis Preston through the CalArts Center for New Performance. In 2022, he received a Tony Award nomination for his role in the Lynn Nottage play Clyde's.

His film credits include his most memorable role as Harlem drug dealer, Rich Porter's uncle "Ice" aka Johnny "Apple" Porter in the 2002 Roc-A-Fella produced film 'Paid In Full' as well as He Got Game (1998), Sweet and Lowdown (1999), Half Nelson (2006), and Across The Universe (2007). In television, he appeared as Reverend Lowdown in the episode "The Goat Rodeo" of the 2013 television series Low Winter Sun and he played Romero, a member of "fsociety" in the 2015 television series Mr. Robot. He also appeared on season 3 of the show Banshee as Philadelphia kingpin Mr. Frazier. He played Harlem chess master Bobby Fish in season 1 of Marvel's Luke Cage. Jones appeared on the NBC drama series This Is Us as William Hill, the biological father of Randall Pearson (Sterling K. Brown). Jones received critical acclaim for his performance on This Is Us and received a Primetime Emmy Award for Outstanding Guest Actor in a Drama Series in 2018 and 2020 for his performance.

Jones appeared in the Hulu teen drama series Looking for Alaska, as well as the Apple TV+ crime drama series Truth Be Told, opposite Octavia Spencer, Lizzy Caplan and Aaron Paul.

== Personal life ==
Jones and British-born jazz singer Kim Lesley had a daughter, actress Jasmine Cephas Jones (born 1989).

== Death ==
Jones had chronic obstructive pulmonary disease, and underwent a double lung transplant in 2020. He died on August 19, 2023, at the age of 66, from what his agent termed "a long-standing pulmonary issue".

== Filmography ==
=== Film ===
Year	Title	Role	Notes
1994	Murder Magic	Buddy Dixon	
1996	Naked Acts	Joel	
1998	He Got Game	Prison Guard Bowell	
1999	A Day in Black and White	Mustafa	
1999	Sweet and Lowdown	Alvin	
2001	Little Senegal	Westley	
2002	Paid in Full	Ice	
2004	Anonymous	Frank	Short film
2004	The Ballad of Pinto Red	Earl House	Short film
2005	Preaching to the Choir	Pug	
2006	Half Nelson	Lloyd Dickson	
2007	Across the Universe	Black Panther	
2010	Ashes	Floyd	
2012	Watching TV with the Red Chinese	Little	
2013	Titus	Titus	
2014	Glass Chin	Ray Ellington	
2014	National Theatre Live: Of Mice and Men	Crooks	
2018	Dog Days	Walter	
2018	Venom	Jack	Uncredited
2018	The Holiday Calendar	Gramps	
2019	Dolemite Is My Name	Ricco	

=== Television ===
Year	Title	Role	Notes
1996	New York Undercover	James Farris	Episode: "Blue Boy"
1996	Law & Order	Frank Doyle	Episode: "Slave"
1997	Law & Order	Roland Books	Episode: "Entrapment"
1997	NYPD Blue	Jess	Episode: "All‘s Well That Ends Well"
1999	Double Platinum	Jean Claude	Television film
2003	Word of Honor	Ramon Detonq	Television film
2006	Law & Order: Criminal Intent	Reggie Banks	Episode: "Dramma Giocoso"
2008	A Raisin in the Sun	Willy Harris	Television film
2012	NYC 22	Arthur Anson	Episode: "Schooled"
2013	Low Winter Sun	Reverend Lowdown	3 episodes
2014	The Blacklist	Dr. James Covington	Episode: "Dr. James Covington (No. 89)"
2015	Banshee	Frazier	2 episodes
2015–2016	Mr. Robot	Romero	8 episodes
2016–2017	The Get Down	Winston Kipling	5 episodes
2016–2018	Luke Cage	Bobby Fish	13 episodes
2016–2022	This Is Us	William "Shakespeare" Hill	Main (season 1), recurring (seasons 2–6); 31 episodes
2019	Looking for Alaska	Dr. Hyde	8 episodes
2019–2023	Truth Be Told	Leander "Shreve" Scoville	28 episodes
2021	Amphibia	Captain Aldo (voice)	Episode: "Barrel's Warhammer"
2021	Lisey's Story	Professor Dashmiel	Miniseries
2021–2022	Law & Order: Organized Crime	Congressman Leon Kilbride	Recurring (season 2); 8 episodes
2022	Better Things	Ron	Recurring (season 5); 3 episodes
2024	Genius: MLK/X	Elijah Muhammad	Main role; posthumous release

=== Stage ===
Year	Title	Role	Notes
1990	Don't Explain	Lee Morgan	Nuyorican Poets Cafe
1994	Holiday Heart	Silas	Manhattan Theatre Club, Off-Broadway
1997	Thunder Knocking on the Door	Marvell Thunder	Yale Repertory Theatre
1999	Everybody's Ruby	Black Citizen/Carpenter	The Public Theater, Off-Broadway
2000	Jesus Hopped the A Train	Lucius Jenkins	LAByrinth Theater Company, Off-Broadway
2003	Our Lady of 121st Street	Rooftop	LAByrinth Theater Company, Off-Broadway
2004	Gem of the Ocean	Eli (Standby)	Walter Kerr Theatre, Broadway
2004	Richard III	Clarence	The Public Theater, Off-Broadway
2006	Radio Golf	Elder Joseph Barlow	National Tour
2006	Two Trains Running	Wolf	Signature Theatre Company, Off-Broadway
2006	Romeo and Juliet	Prince Escalus	Williamstown Theatre Festival
2006	The Wooden Breeks	Toom the Stoup	MCC Theater, Off-Broadway
2006	Satellites	Reggie	The Public Theater, Off-Broadway
2007	Armed and Naked in America: Week A	Ensemble	The Duke on 42nd Street, Off-Broadway
2007	The Overwhelming	Joseph Gasana	Laura Pels Theater, Off-Broadway
2008	The Last Days of Judas Iscariot	Uncle Pino/Pontius Pilate	Almeida Theatre
2009	Wildflower	Mitchell	Second Stage Theater, Off-Broadway
2010	As You Like It	Charles	Brooklyn Academy of Music, Off-Broadway
2010	The Tempest	Caliban	Brooklyn Academy of Music, Off-Broadway
2011	Ajax	Odysseus	American Repertory Theater
2011	The Motherfucker With the Hat	Ralph D.	Gerald Schoenfeld Theatre, Broadway
2011	Titus Andronicus	Aaron	The Public Theater, Off-Broadway
2012	Hurt Village	Tony C	Pershing Square Signature Center
2012	Storefront Church	Chester Kimmich	Atlantic Theater Company, Off-Broadway
2012	Richard III	Richard III	The Public Theater's Mobile Shakespeare Unit
2013	Head of Passes	Creaker	Steppenwolf Theatre Company
2014	Of Mice and Men	Crooks	Longacre Theatre, Broadway
2014	Prometheus Bound	Prometheus	Getty Villa
2015	Between Riverside and Crazy	Junior	Second Stage Theater, Off-Broadway
2015	The Tempest	Prospero	Classical Theatre of Harlem
2022	Clyde's	Montrellous	Helen Hayes Theater, Broadway

=== Video games ===
Year	Title	Role	Notes
2018	Madden NFL 19	Earl Coates	Story mode, "Longshot Homecoming"

== Awards and nominations ==
Year	Award	Category	Project	Result
2017	Gold Derby Awards	Best Drama Supporting Actor	This Is Us	Nominated
2017	Black Reel Awards for Television	Outstanding Supporting Actor, Drama Series	This Is Us	Won
2017	Primetime Emmy Awards	Outstanding Supporting Actor in a Drama Series	This Is Us	Nominated
2017	OFTA Television Awards	Best Supporting Actor in a Drama Series	This Is Us	Nominated
2018	Screen Actors Guild Award	Outstanding Performance by an Ensemble in a Drama Series	This Is Us	Won
2018	Gold Derby Awards	Best Drama Guest Actor	This Is Us	Nominated
2018	Black Reel Awards for Television	Outstanding Guest Actor, Drama Series	This Is Us	Won
2018	Primetime Emmy Awards	Outstanding Guest Actor in a Drama Series	This Is Us	Won
2019	Primetime Emmy Awards	Outstanding Guest Actor in a Drama Series	This Is Us	Nominated
2020	Primetime Emmy Awards	Outstanding Guest Actor in a Drama Series	This Is Us	Won
2022	Tony Awards	Best Performance by a Featured Actor in a Play	Clyde's	Nominated
2022	Drama Desk Awards	Outstanding Featured Actor in a Play	Clyde's	Won
2024	Critics' Choice Awards	Best Supporting Actor in a Drama Series	Truth Be Told	Nominated

== See also ==
- Lists of actors
- List of people from Chicago
- Jasmine Cephas Jones
- List of people from New York City
