= Robbie Kondor =

American composer, musician and arranger (1955–2025)

- Born: January 15, 1955; Budapest, Hungary
- Died: December 10, 2025 (aged 70); North Salem, New York, U.S.
- Occupations: Composer, musician, arranger, adjunct instructor
- Spouse: Emily Bindiger

Robert Kondor (January 15, 1955 – December 10, 2025) was an American composer, session musician, arranger and adjunct instructor.

== Background ==
Kondor was born on January 15, 1955, in Budapest, Hungary, and grew up in Queens, New York. He held a Bachelor’s Degree from the Manhattan School of Music.

He was married to singer and musician Emily Bindiger. They lived in North Salem, New York. He was previously married to Carole King's daughter, Sherry Goffin-Kondor.

Kondor died from prion disease at his home in North Salem on December 10, 2025, at the age of 70.

== Career ==
=== Music ===
Kondor is credited as a keyboard player, backing musician and arranger on albums by Eric Clapton, Elle Goulding, Aretha Franklin, Barbra Streisand, Billy Joel, Whitney Houston, Bee Gees and several others.

He was the band leader and announcer for Hot Properties in 1985, and participated in the House Band on five Pavarotti and Friends specials from 1998 to 2002. He filled in for Paul Shaffer on the Late Show with David Letterman on two episodes, in 1994 and 2003, and played keyboards in the band on many other occasions.

In 2010 Kondor joined the Troubadour Reunion Tour supporting James Taylor and Carole King.

Kondor co-produced the Jewel albums Joy: A Holiday Collection in 1999 and Let It Snow: A Holiday Collection in 2013.

In April 2025, Kondor performed at a fundraising concert for ALS United Greater New York which took place at SUNY Purchase. In October 2025, Kondor performed at the Save the Lake! fundraising gala for the Peach Lake Environmental Coalition in North Salem.

=== Films ===
Kondor worked as a composer on The Significant Other, Ball In The House, Sally Jessy Raphael, Happiness (1998), The Suburbans (1999), Forever Fabulous (1999), Drawing Angel (2001), Series 7: The Contenders (2001), Home Delivery (2004) and Equality U (2008). He worked as a producer for The Sum of All Fears (2002), and as an arranger on Beaches (1988), and the 32nd Annual Grammy Awards (1990).

=== Teaching ===
Kondor was the Adjunct Instructor of Music in Applied Audio Production at Western Connecticut State University.

== Awards and nominations ==
- National Academy of Recording Arts and Sciences Most Valuable Player Award
- Elevate Film Festival Best Original Score

Daytime Emmy Awards:

- Won, 1999, Outstanding Music Direction and Composition for a Drama Series for: "All My Children" (shared with Paul F. Antonelli, A.J. Gundell, Pamela Magee, Dominic Messinger, Ron Goodman, Mike Renzi, Terry Walker, Gary Kuo)
- Nominated, 2000, Outstanding Achievement in Music Direction and Composition for a Drama Series for: "All My Children" (shared with Terry Walker, A.J. Gundell, Jerry Pilato, Dominic Messinger, Mike Renzi, Gary Kuo, and Ron Goodman)
- Nominated, 2001, Outstanding Achievement in Music Direction and Composition for a Drama Series for: "All My Children" (shared with Terry Walker, A.J. Gundell, Jerry Pilato, Dominic Messinger, Gary Kuo, Mike Renzi, John Wineglass, Brian Comotto, Loris Holland, and Ron Goodman)
- Won, 2002, Outstanding Achievement in Music Direction and Composition for a Drama Series for: "All My Children" (shared with Terry Walker, A.J. Gundell, Jerry Pilato, Dominic Messinger, Gary Kuo, Mike Renzi, John Wineglass, Brian Comotto, Loris Holland, Ron Goodman, and Peter Fish)
- Won, 2003, Outstanding Achievement in Music Direction and Composition for a Drama Series for: "All My Children" (shared with Terry Walker, Andrew J. Gundell, Jerry Pilato, Dominic Messinger, Gary Kuo, Mike Renzi, John Wineglass, Brian Comotto, Loris Holland, Ron Goodman, Brian Tarquin, Kim Oler, Peter Fish, and Jim Klein)
