= Gary Kuo =

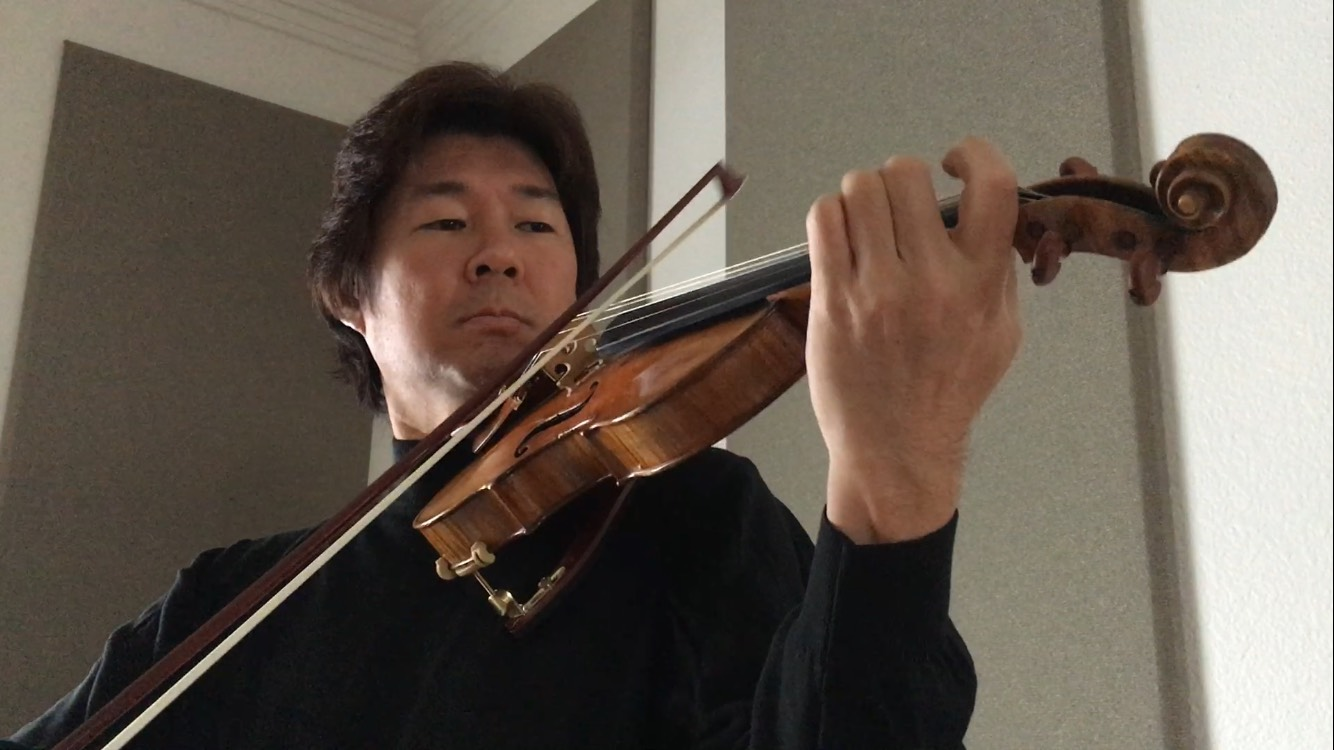
- Gary Kuo in 2017

Background information
- Origin: Connecticut, U.S.
- Occupations: Composer and violinist
- Instrument: Violin
- Website: garykuo.com

Gary Kuo is an American composer and violinist. He has worked as a composer on Another Night (2003), As the World Turns and All My Children. He played the violin for the film The Glass Shield in 1994, and instructed on the violin for Mirror, Mirror 2: Raven Dance that same year.

== Biography ==
Gary Kuo, originally from Connecticut, moved to New York City to accept a scholarship to Juilliard School, where he received his bachelor of arts degree in violin performance. After completion of his studies at Juilliard School, he received a scholarship to the media writing and production graduate program at the University of Miami. Following his graduation, he relocated to Los Angeles, where he composes for and performs on a variety of television programs and motion pictures.

== Awards and nominations ==
Daytime Emmy awards:

- Won, 1999, Outstanding Music Direction and Composition for a Drama Series for: All My Children (shared with Paul F. Antonelli, Pamela Magee, Dominic Messinger, Ron Goodman, Robbie Kondor, Mike Renzi, and Terry Walker)
- Nominated, 2000, Outstanding Achievement in Music Direction and Composition for a Drama Series for: All My Children (shared with Terry Walker, Jerry Pilato, Dominic Messinger, Mike Renzi, Robbie Kondor, and Ron Goodman)
- Nominated, 2001, Outstanding Achievement in Music Direction and Composition for a Drama Series for: All My Children (shared with Terry Walker, A.J. Gundell, Jerry Pilato, Dominic Messinger, Mike Renzi, John Wineglass, Brian Comotto, Loris Holland, Robbie Kondor, Ron Goodman)
- Won, 2001, Outstanding Achievement in Music Direction and Composition for a Drama Series for: As the World Turns (shared with Pamela Magee, James Kowal, Robert Sands, Ed Dzuback, Tom Kochan, Dominic Messinger, R. C. Cates, Kevin Bents, and David Nichtern)
- Nominated, 2002, Outstanding Achievement in Music Direction and Composition for a Drama Series for: As the World Turns (shared with Pamela Magee, James Kowal, Ed Dzuback, David Nichtern, Kevin Bents, Jamie Lawrence, Bette Sussman, Tom Kochan, Robert Sands, and Dominic Messinger)
- Won, 2002, Outstanding Achievement in Music Direction and Composition for a Drama Series for: All My Children (shared with Terry Walker, A.J. Gundell, Jerry Pilato, Dominic Messinger, Mike Renzi, John Wineglass, Brian Comotto, Loris Holland, Robbie Kondor, Ron Goodman, and Peter Fish)
- Nominated, 2003, Outstanding Achievement in Music Direction and Composition for a Drama Series for: As the World Turns (shared with Pamela Magee, James Kowal, Kevin Bents, Ed Dzuback, Tom Kochan, Jamie Lawrence, Dave Marino, David Nichtern, Brian D. Siewert, and Bette Sussman)
- Won, 2003, Outstanding Achievement in Music Direction and Composition for a Drama Series for: All My Children (shared with Terry Walker, Andrew J. Gundell, Jerry Pilato, Dominic Messinger, Mike Renzi, John Wineglass, Brian Comotto, Loris Holland, Robbie Kondor, Ron Goodman, Brian Tarquin, Kim Oler, Peter Fish, and Jim Klein)
- Nominated, 2004, Outstanding Achievement in Music Direction and Composition for a Drama Series for: All My Children (shared with Terry Walker, A.J. Gundell, Jerry Pilato, John Wineglass, Brian Comotto, Loris Holland, Brian Tarquin, Kim Oler, Peter Fish, Tom Spahn, and Jim Klein)
- Won, 2005, Outstanding Achievement in Music Direction and Composition for a Drama Series for: All My Children (shared with Terry Walker, Jerry Pilato, A.J. Gundell, Dominic Messinger, R. C. Cates, John Wineglass, Brian Comotto, Loris Holland, Brian Tarquin, Kim Oler, Peter Fish, Tom Spahn, and Jim Klein) (tied with Paul Glass, Daniel Krausz (II), David Nichtern, Dominic Messinger, Dave Marino, Lee Holdridge, Jordan Lieb, Kevin Bents, Bette Sussman and Michal Towber for One Life to Live)
- Nominated, 2006, Outstanding Achievement in Music Direction and Composition for a Drama Series for: As the World Turns (shared with Bryan Lydell, James Kowal, David Nichtern, Kevin Bents, Jordan Lieb, George Whitty, Ed Dzubak, Jamie Lawrence, Michael Licari, and Dominic Messinger)
