= Marissa Chibás =

Cuban-American actress, filmmaker, director and writer

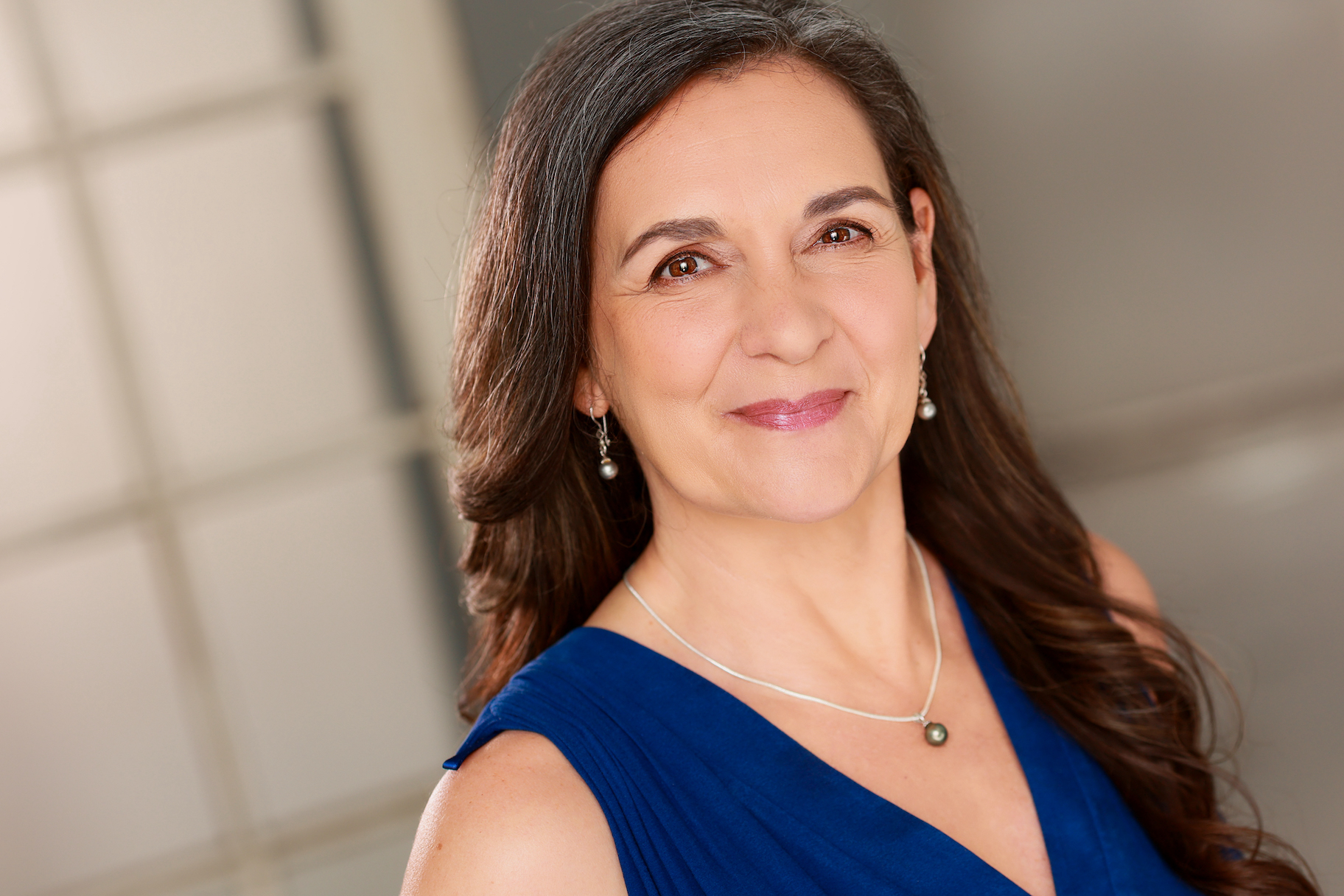
- Born: 1969 (age 56–57); New York City
- Education: SUNY Purchase
- Known for: Theater artist, filmmaker, author
- Notable work: Daughter of a Cuban Revolutionary, Shelter, Finding Shelter, A Cuban Documemory, Mythic Imagination and the Actor

Marissa Chibás (born 1969) is a Cuban American writer, actress, filmmaker, and director.

Chibás created the feature-length documentary film A Cuban Documemory and the short film Finding Shelter, inspired by her play Shelter. Her most recent feature screenplay, 72, was selected for Sundance's feature film development track in 2022.

== Personal life ==
Born in New York City, Marissa Chibás was raised by Cuban exiled refugees Raúl Chibás and Dalia Chibás. Her father was a Cuban politician and military officer who co-wrote and signed the 1957 Cuban Revolution Manifesto with Fidel Castro and Felipe Pazos, and later defected to the United States as an anti-Castro activist. Her mother was Miss Cuba runner-up in 1959.

== Career ==
=== Theater and film acting ===
Chibás appeared first on Broadway in Brighton Beach Memoirs. Her next Broadway credit was in Abe Lincoln in Illinois. Her most notable off-Broadway and regional productions include Danton's Death, Nilo Cruz's Two Sisters and a Piano, and Chay Yew's adaptation of The House of Bernarda Alba. Chibás co-adapted the award-winning CNP/Poor Dog Group production of Gertrude Stein's Brewsie and Willie and presented it at the 2011 RADAR Festival. She played Edgar in CNP's inaugural production of King Lear at The Brewery.

Her solo show, Daughter of a Cuban Revolutionary, the one-woman play tells a tale centered on the three towering figures in her life, zigzagging her own stories and key episodes in the history of her illustrious family. The New York City premiere directed by Mira Kingsley took place at the DR2 Theatre, followed by a tour of the production over the next several years to Miami, the Guadalajara Feria Internacional de Libro, the Edinburgh Fringe Festival, ArtsEmerson, and finally was produced at the Goodman Theatre.

In 2017, she co-created and performed in a video installation Nostalgia at Fabrica de Arte in Havana in collaboration with Cuban visual artist Aissa Santiso, which was also presented at Plaza de la Reza in Los Angeles.

Most recently on stage, Chibás performed as the character Lourdes in the world premiere of Octavio Solis's Scenes with Cranes, directed by Chi-wang Yang and produced by the CalArts Center for New Performance at REDCAT in 2022.

Her notable film and TV credits include Law & Order, Henry Fool, Cold Feet, and Zohra, which was nominated for several awards at the Official Latino Film and Arts Festival and Women's Only Entertainment Film Festival. Her silent film/performance piece Clara's Los Angeles was presented at REDCAT's NOW Festival and her short Clandestino was featured on the LibroTraficante radio show.

=== Writing and filmmaking ===
In 2016, Chibás wrote the play Shelter, produced by CalArts Center for New Performance and Duende CalArts. Shelter is a movement-based theatrical performance. The play was featured on NPR's Code Switch in an article called "Child Migrants' Harrowing Journey Brought To Life On Stage". In 2019, Chibás made a short film documentary Finding Shelter, inspired by her play Shelter. It won Best Documentary Short at the San Diego Latino Film Festival and screened at the Official Latino Film and Arts Festival.

In 2021, Chibás created a feature-length documentary film called A Cuban Documemory. She won the Best Documentary Award at the 2021 Cuban American International Film Festival.

Her feature screenplay 72 is in development. It was selected for Sundance’s feature film development track and as an Athena Film Festival Awards finalist.

Chibás' play Daughter of a Cuban Revolutionary is featured in the 2nd edition of the anthology Contemporary Plays by Women of Color, edited by Roberta Uno and published by Routledge in 2017.

=== Teaching ===
Chibás is on the School of Theater faculty at the California Institute of the Arts. She is the Director of Duende CalArts established in 2009. Duende CalArts is a Latinx initiative at CalArts Center for New Performance that collaborates with innovative Latinx and Latin American artists.

=== Recognition ===
Chibás is the recipient of a TCG Fox Fellowship in Distinguished Achievement (2016), and a Sundance Institute Screenwriting Fellow (2022).
