= Loris Holland =

American songwriter

- Born: British Guyana
- Occupations: Television, film, composer, songwriter, music industry

Loris Holland is a Guyanese born composer, record producer, keyboardist and songwriter, residing in America. He is also known as Time Shadow.

== Biography ==
Holland grew up in the British Guyana, in a musical family, his mother forbade any music other than hymns and classical music, due to the deaths of her father and brother on separate occasions, due to night life while playing popular music at nightclubs. His mother Ruby Holland , owned a music school , ran from the home, so he grew up surrounded by multiple pianos , classical and sacred music emanating from every corner of the house.

His talent was discovered one day when his oldest sister Elizabeth was practicing Beethoven’s Moonlight Sonata for an upcoming recital. Holland at four years old, started playing the melody, barely reaching the keys without seeing them standing on the floor, from another piano across the room, in concert with his sister. He continued for at least 16 bars before the family realized what was actually happening. Everyone was amazed since they didn’t even know that he could play the piano. That is when his mother tested him and discovered that he had Perfect Pitch. He could listen to anything once. And play it back on the piano.

He would often play. the piano until he fell asleep on Lt. Eventually, when he was thirteen years old, he began to play keyboards in reggae bands in secret, until his parents found out when he was fourteen.

Years later, his mother gave up the ban on popular music, and Holland eventually pursued a scholarship in New York City, where he attended the Aaron Copland School of Music. During the mid-seventies, at school Holland met Marcus Miller who became a great musical influence and help Holland adapt to this new culture in United States of America. Miller connected him with other famous musicians musicians opening opportunities for Holland to do sessions with them. However, he did not have confidence in his own abilities, and so declined most of the time. His musical career began when he successfully auditioned as musical director at the Brooklyn Pilgrim Church. He then called in his colleagues from college to work with him, and eventually started his own gospel/fusion band.

As Holland's career blossomed, he received offers from numerous gospel artists, but he declined, in order to stay with the church, until he realized he would need more than the $350 per month salary he received. He then co-produced a Christmas album by Mariah Carey, with Carey and Walter Afanasieff, and also set up a writing and production deal with Zomba Music and Jive Records. He later worked at London's battery studio's, together with artists including Jonathan Butler and Ruby Turner, but quit work there after a dissatisfaction with cuts made on the album he had worked on with Turner, and after Zomba Music called his writing partners to join them. and his singers teamed up with Mariah Carey, (although they would still call on him to play music for them, and ask to use it in their tracks) he resumed work at the Brooklyn Pilgrim Church.

Holland was eventually asked by Tony Prendatt to help Fugees member Lauryn Hill, who was working on her own hip-hop record, but was unhappy with her players. When he played for her, she had him redo everything on the track, in favor of his work. She asked him to be her musical director, but he declined though he stayed and helped her band along.

== Awards and nominations ==
He has been nominated for five Daytime Emmy awards from 2001 to 2005, all of which were for Outstanding Achievement in Music Direction and Composition for a Drama Series, for his work on All My Children. He won the award in 2002, 2003, and 2005. His first nomination was shared with Terry Walker, A.J. Gundell, Jerry Pilato, Dominic Messinger, Gary Kuo, Mike Renzi, John Wineglass, Brian Comotto, Robbie Kondor, and Ron Goodman. His first win was shared with the above, plus Peter Fish.

== Credits ==
- Merry Christmas (1994)
- Grace (1994)
- Everyone Says I Love You (1996)
- A Day in Black and White (1999)
- All My Children
- Rude Buay (2008)
- The Hunt (2008)
