= Merry Christmas (Mariah Carey album) =

Studio album by Mariah Carey
- Released: October 28, 1994
- Recorded: December 1993 – August 1994
- Studio: The Hit Factory (New York City)
- Genre: Christmas
- Length: 38:09
- Label: Columbia
- Producers: Mariah Carey; Walter Afanasieff; Loris Holland

Mariah Carey chronology
Music Box (1993)	Merry Christmas (1994)	Daydream (1995)

Singles from Merry Christmas
- 1. "All I Want for Christmas Is You" Released: October 29, 1994; 2. "Miss You Most (At Christmas Time)" Released: November 1, 1994; 3. "Joy to the World" Released: November 27, 1995

Merry Christmas is the fourth studio album and first Christmas album by American singer-songwriter Mariah Carey. It was released by Columbia Records on October 28, 1994, at the peak of the initial stretch of Carey's career, between Music Box (1993) and Daydream (1995). The album features cover versions of popular Christmas songs in addition to original material. Carey worked with Walter Afanasieff, with whom she wrote all of the original tracks, as well as producing Carey's interpretations of the covered material. Three singles were released from the album, of which "All I Want for Christmas Is You" went on to become one of the best-selling singles of all time and the best-selling Christmas ringtone in the United States.

Critical response to the album's Christmas theme was mixed. Some music critics complimented the gospel and soul-infused vocals and even called it Carey's best album to date. Re-released on multiple occasions in various formats since its debut, the album has sold 5.7 million copies in the United States as of December 2019 and has been certified Diamond by the Recording Industry Association of America. Internationally, it reached number one in Japan, Latvia, and Lithuania. It achieved the top-ten in 20 additional countries including Australia, Canada, Germany, the Netherlands, New Zealand, Sweden, Switzerland, and the United States. Merry Christmas has sold 18 million copies worldwide, and is confirmed as the best-selling holiday album by a female artist.

== Background ==
Carey has expressed her belief in God and the connection between music and spirituality, and felt the album was finally a way to portray her spirituality through music. After the success of Carey's previous effort, Music Box, there was speculation of a new project in the works; however it was not until October 1994, only one month before the album's release, that Billboard announced Carey would be releasing an album for the Christmas season. Initially, critics were shocked; they did not know how Carey would fare as an entertainer across genres, as she had previously only been viewed as a pop star. Nevertheless, Carey, unaffected by the speculation, continued working on and promoting the album in high spirits, confident in her work. The idea proved to be wise, earning Carey recognition in various markets including Christian radio and contemporary R&B stations, as well as extended her fame in Japan, where the album experienced much of its success.

== Conception and composition ==
'All I Want for Christmas Is You'
The lead single from the album, the song became a holiday classic and has achieved many awards and accolades.

Throughout the album's development, Carey worked with Walter Afanasieff, with whom she collaborated on Emotions (1991) and Music Box (1993). Together, they wrote all three of the album's original songs, as well as producing most of the traditional tracks at The Hit Factory, in New York.

Merry Christmas boasted a variety of musical arrangements, sounds, and genres. Carey's goal was to provide an album that would have a "Christmas feel", providing a mixture of soulful tracks, as well as fun and joyous holiday treats. Genre-wise, the album is a combination of soul, gospel, and R&B.The song "Jesus Oh What a Wonderful Child", produced by Carey, Afanasieff, and Loris Holland, was described as an arrangement of a traditional gospel standard that "really took flight". The song was recorded in a church, with many live backup singers and children playing tambourines and other melodious instruments. The goal was to produce a "real church flavored song", in which Holland played the keyboards and allowed Carey's voice to "cut loose". According to Chris Nickson, Carey's love of gospel music came through on the track, writing, "[she] led the band without pushing herself forward, letting the song develop and work out, trading lines with the chorus until, after the crescendo, the musicians moved into a fast double-time to the end."

"You have to have a nice balance between standard Christian hymns and fun songs. It was definitely a priority for me to write at least a few new songs, but for the most part, people really want to hear the standards at Christmas, no matter how good a new song is."

— Carey, describing Merry Christmas during an interview with CD Review

"All I Want for Christmas Is You", the album's lead single was described as an "up-tempo love song, one that could have easily been written for Tommy Mottola". "Miss You Most (At Christmas Time)", another one of the album's original tracks, was very different from its predecessor. The song was described as a "sad ballad", in line with many of Carey's previous hit singles. The song featured a synthesized orchestra, including keyboard notes courtesy of Afanasieff, during which Carey would sing to her "long-gone lover, crystallizing the way that Christmas brought memories of the past into focus." According to Nickson "Jesus Born on This Day" was the most impressive original track on the album. It was described as a "full-blown production number", which again featured synthesized orchestra, as well as a live children's choir. The song's tune was described as "solemn and hymn-like, but the arrangement, oddly, made it less religious and rather more glitzy, behind the lyrics that overtly praised Jesus."

In addition, Carey recorded a cover of "Christmas (Baby Please Come Home)" by Darlene Love, as well as classics such as "Silent Night", "O Holy Night" and "Joy to the World". The latter song, which was used as a promotional single, was remixed several times and sent to various clubs; adding to the album's range of listeners. Record producer and composer Holland also co-produced some of the albums gospel flavored tracks, including "Silent Night", where he arranged the backing vocals and synthesizers. Carey's rendition of "Santa Claus Is Comin' to Town", was deemed as "one of the more playful tracks on the album", alongside "Christmas (Baby Please Come Home)".

== Promotion ==
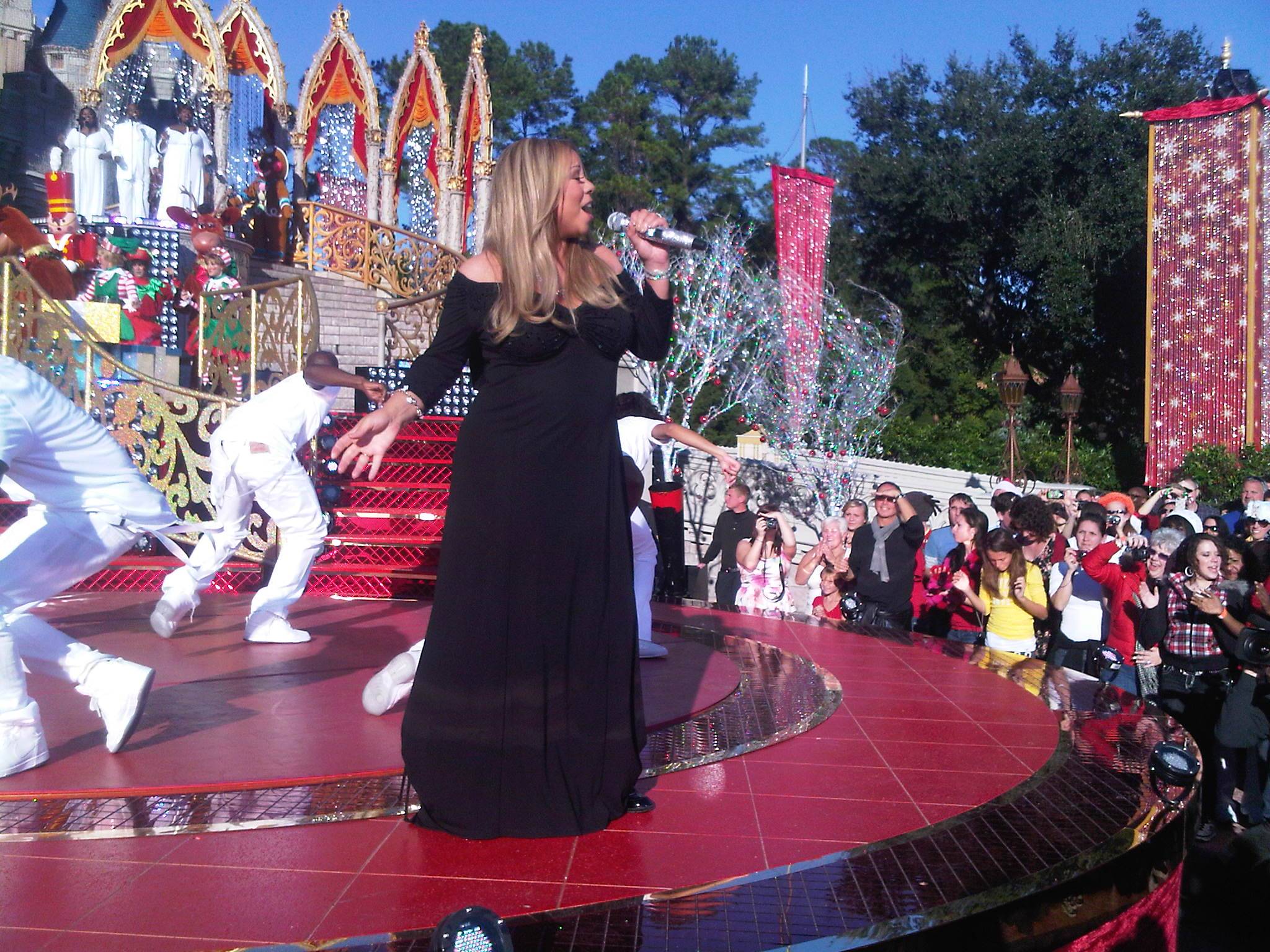
Carey performing "All I Want for Christmas is You" at the Walt Disney World Resort in Orlando, Florida, on December 3, 2010.

In the United States, Carey started promotion for Merry Christmas with a live concert at the Cathedral of St. John the Divine on December 8, 1994, performing for the first time several tracks from the album, including "All I Want for Christmas Is You", which was later performed on several of her concert tours, including the Japanese shows of Carey's Daydream World Tour (1996), Butterfly World Tour (1998), Rainbow World Tour (2000), Charmbracelet World Tour (2003) and The Adventures of Mimi Tour (2006), due to the massive success of the song in Japan, which became her best-selling single in the country. On December 25, 2001, she appeared on the Christmas special BET Christmas Remembrances Special, where she performed "Joy to the World" and her hit "One Sweet Day" with Boyz II Men. Three years later, she appeared in 2004 Walt Disney World Christmas Day Parade, where she performed "Joy to the World" and "All I Want for Christmas is You".

On December 3, 2008, she performed "Christmas (Baby Please Come Home)" at the 2008 Grammy Nomination Concert. A year later, Carey sang the So So Def remix version of "All I Want for Christmas is You" at the opening night of her Angels Advocate Tour on New Year's Eve. Other live performances of "All I Want for Christmas is You" includes the 2010 Walt Disney World Christmas Day Parade, Christmas In Rockefeller Center (in 2012, 2013 and 2014) and Late Night with Jimmy Fallon in 2012, where she performed the song alongside Jimmy Fallon and The Roots. Carey also performed "All I Want for Christmas is You" with Michael Bublé for his third Annual Christmas Special in December 2013. She also performed the song at the 91st Annual National Christmas Tree Lighting on December 16, 2013.

During The Late Late Show with James Corden on December 15, 2016, Carey sang "All I Want for Christmas is You" on the feature Carpool Karaoke. Fellow singers Adele, Lady Gaga, Demi Lovato, Nick Jonas, Elton John, Selena Gomez, Gwen Stefani, Coldplay's Chris Martin and the band Red Hot Chili Peppers were featured in the video. Carey also performed the song at The Wonderful World of Disney: Magical Holiday Celebration, VH1 Divas Holiday: Unsilent Night and Disney Parks Magical Christmas Celebration in 2016. In December 2019, Carey returned to The Late Late Show to perform the song for its 25th anniversary.

To celebrate the 20th anniversary of Merry Christmas, Carey embarked on her first Christmas concert residency, All I Want For Christmas Is You, A Night of Joy & Festivity, which began on December 15, 2014, at the Beacon Theatre in New York City, and ended on December 15, 2019, after completing eight legs and fifty-six shows in North America and Europe. On December 1, 2020, Carey performed a medley of "Heroes", "Hero", and "Joy to the World" at Good Morning America, two days prior to her Christmas special Mariah Carey's Magical Christmas Special, where she re-recorded and performed several songs from the album. The following year, she performed "Christmas (Baby Please Come Home)" and a new song, "Fall in Love at Christmas", during her 2021 Christmas Special Mariah's Christmas: The Magic Continues. She also performed "All I Want for Christmas is You" at the 2022 Macy's Thanksgiving Day Parade.

=== Singles ===
Merry Christmas was supported by three commercial singles and two promotional singles, with different releases depending on the country. The album's lead single, "All I Want for Christmas Is You", was released on October 29, 1994, in Japan, and in other countries the next month. While it was not initially commercially released in the United States, Billboard described Columbia's level of promotion as unprecedented for a Christmas album. On November 14, 1994, the label released three songs to US radio stations as promotional singles: "All I Want for Christmas Is You" (top 40 and adult contemporary radio stations), "Jesus Born on This Day" (Christian and gospel stations), and "Miss You Most (At Christmas Time)" (R&B stations). The latter was also commercially released that year, including in the Philippines where it served as the lead single in that country. Originally released in 1994 as a 12-inch promotional single of dance remixes, "Joy to the World" was released in Australia as the album's third single on November 27, 1995, becoming a top-forty hit there. "O Holy Night" was released as a promotional single in 1996 and 1998, and later peaked at number 70 on the US Holiday 100 chart, and entered the charts in France, Italy and Iceland; later being certified Platinum in the United States and Canada; and Gold in Denmark, Italy and New Zealand.

"All I Want for Christmas Is You" remains Carey's biggest international hit of her career, breaking several records worldwide and topping the charts in over 30 countries, including Australia, Canada, France, Germany, the UK Singles chart and the US Billboard Hot 100, becoming the best-selling Christmas song by a female artist and one of the best-selling singles of all time, selling over 16 million copies worldwide. In the United States, "All I Want for Christmas Is You" is the second longest-running number-one song on the chart, spending 22 weeks atop. Additionally, the song was certified 18× Platinum in the US, becoming the first holiday song to achieve this and the highest-certified song by a female artist in the country. In Germany, the song also broke the record for the longest-running chart-topper in the country, with 22 weeks at number one, being certified 3× Platinum. It is also Carey's best-selling single in the United Kingdom, where it was certified ten times Platinum, selling over six million units in the country, becoming the highest-certified song of all time by a female artist in the UK. It is also her best-selling single in Canada and Australia, where it was certified Diamond and 13× Platinum, respectively.

Other songs from the album also achieved success worldwide:

- Her version of Darlene Love's "Christmas (Baby Please Come Home)" reached the top-twenty on the US Holiday 100 chart, and the top-forty in Croatia, Latvia, Lithuania, Slovakia and the Netherlands; and was certified 2× Platinum in Canada; Platinum in the United States; and Gold in Australia, New Zealand, Portugal and the United Kingdom.
- Her version of "Santa Claus Is Comin' to Town" peaked at number 26 in Hungary, at number 45 on the US Holiday 100, and at number 142 in South Korea; and was also certified Gold in Australia, Canada and the United States.
- Her version of "Silent Night" also charted at number 95 in the Netherlands, and was certified Gold in Canada.
- "Hark! The Herald Angels Sing" / "Gloria (In Excelsis Deo)" also charted on the US Holiday 100 at number 54, and was certified Platinum in the United States.

== Editions ==
- In 2005, the album was re-released as a special edition DualDisc. This edition included two bonus tracks, "God Rest Ye Merry Gentlemen" - with a new vocal mix - and a special anniversary mix of "Santa Claus Is Comin' to Town" on the CD side. The DVD side features the entire album in enhanced PCM stereo and music videos.
- In 2019, a two-disc 25th anniversary deluxe edition was released, which included the original album and its bonus tracks on disc one, while disc two included a new track called "Sugar Plum Fairy Introlude", live performances from St. John The Divine, select songs from Merry Christmas II You, non-album Christmas singles, and numerous remixes. As of 2021, Merry Christmas has sold 15 million copies worldwide, becoming one of the best-selling holiday albums of all time.
- In 2024, for the album's 30th anniversary, another deluxe edition was released featuring remastered versions of the live performances from St. John The Divine (including "Hero"), and the video version of "Miss You Most (At Christmas Time)".

== Reception ==
=== Critical reception ===
Professional ratings
Review scores
Source	Rating
AllMusic	4/5 stars
The Atlanta Journal-Constitution	2/4 stars
The Encyclopedia of Popular Music	2/5 stars
Entertainment Weekly	C
Los Angeles Times	2/4 stars
Philadelphia Daily News	1.5/4 stars
Pitchfork	7.3/10
The Province	3.5/5 stars
Q	3/5 stars
The Tampa Tribune	2/4 stars

In the Los Angeles Times, Chris Willman wrote that Carey "attempts her share of girl-group pop amid the quasi-gospel melisma, though still not evidencing as much personality as talent in either style". The New York Times journalist Jon Pareles was more critical in his review. "Regardless of backup, Ms. Carey oversings, glutting songs with her vocal tics—like sliding down from the note above the melody note—and turning expressions of devotion into narcissistic displays." Chris Dickinson from the Chicago Tribune called the singer a "trilling songbird" and "over-the-top irritant" throughout the album, particularly on "All I Want for Christmas Is You", where she "sounds like a bush-league Petula Clark". The newspaper later named it the seventh worst Christmas album ever.

J. D. Considine was more enthusiastic in The Baltimore Sun. In his opinion, Merry Christmas "may look like just another attempt to cash in on Christmas cheer, but is actually the work of someone who genuinely loves this music". Considine said while Carey's gospel and soul-inflected vocal exercises worked well with the traditional songs, "the album's real strength is the conviction she brings to otherwise corny fare like "Santa Claus Is Comin' to Town", while the way she augments "Joy to the World" with a bit of the Three Dog Night hit is pure genius." Steve Morse from The Boston Globe argued that it was perhaps Carey's best record, on which she abandoned the overly polished sound of her previous albums and "cut loose with unbridled soul".

=== Retrospective reception ===
In a retrospective review, Barry Schwartz of Stylus Magazine believed Merry Christmas may have been "the definitive Mariah Carey album", finding the singer at "her absolute creative and commercial peak, her voice still a marvel, her songs and performances still undeniably brilliant". AllMusic editor Roch Parisien deemed "All I Want for Christmas Is You" the record's highlight while lamenting Carey's "high opera" pretensions on "O Holy Night" and her dance/club rendition of "Joy to the World".

== Commercial performance ==
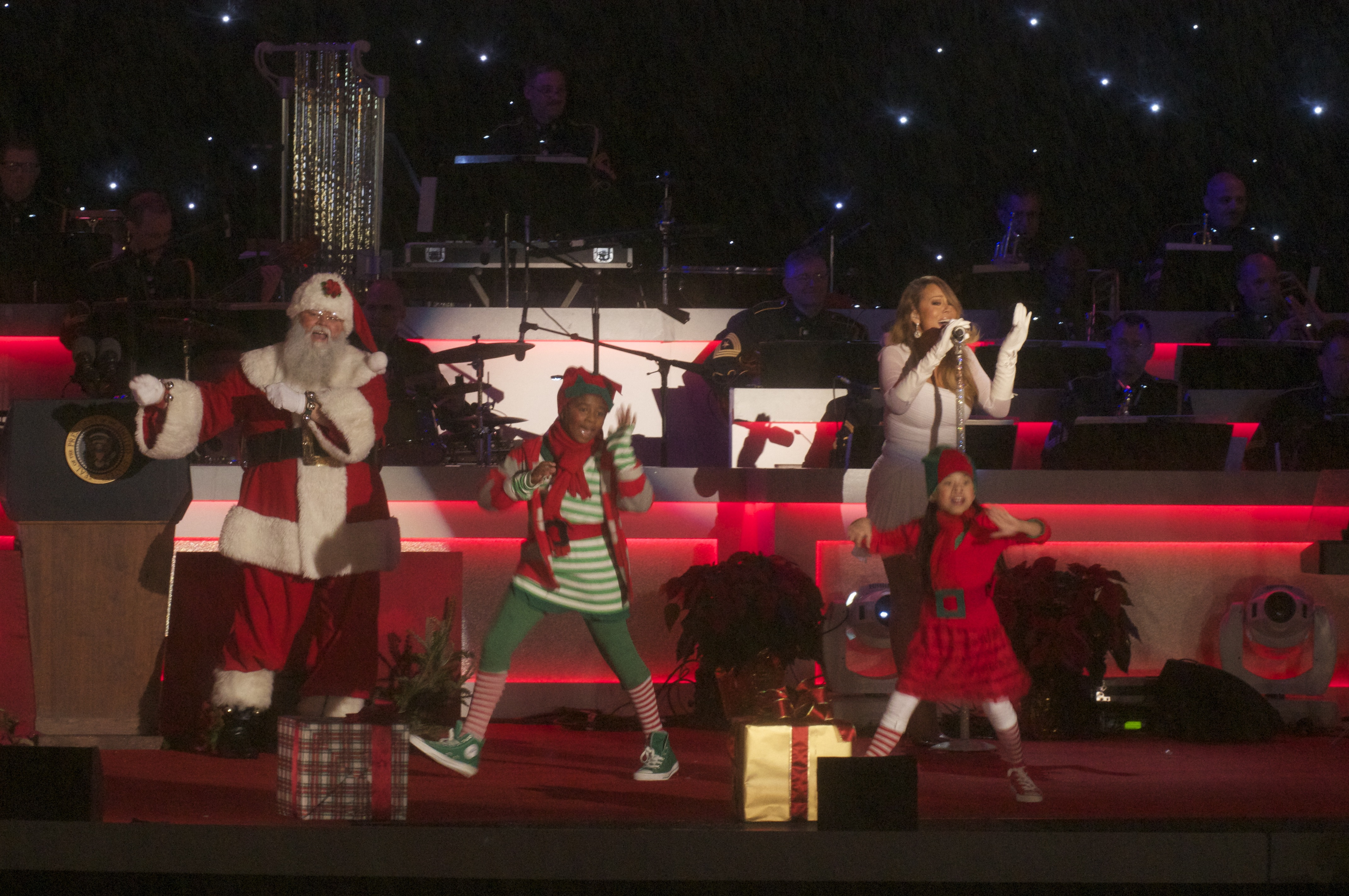
Carey performing "All I Want for Christmas Is You" at the National Christmas Tree Lighting ceremony near the White House on December 6, 2013.

Merry Christmas was released in the United States on November 1, 1994, and debuted at number thirty on the US Billboard 200 with 45,000 copies sold in its first week. In its fifth week, the album peaked at number three, with sales of 208,000 copies, but experienced its highest sales in its sixth week (when it was at number six), with another 500,000 copies sold. The album was the second best-selling holiday album that year with a total of 1,859,000 copies sold. It remained in the top twenty for eight weeks and on the Billboard 200 for thirteen weeks, reentering the chart three times; peaking at number 149 the first time, 115 the second and at 61 the third (it has spent a total of 124 weeks on the chart). On December 15, 2025, Merry Christmas was certified Diamond by the Recording Industry Association of America for shipment of ten million copies in the US. As of December 2019, the album has sold 5.7 million copies in the US and is one of the best-selling holiday albums in the United States. In 2021, the album was named by Billboard as the third Greatest Holiday Album of All Time.

Merry Christmas became Carey's first number-one album in Japan, where the album experienced its highest sales, where it sold 2.8 million copies and became the fourth best-selling album by a non-Asian solo artist.

In Europe, Merry Christmas experienced success, peaking at number one in Latvia and Lithuania; at number two in Germany, Sweden and the Netherlands; at number three in Italy; at number four in Austria, Belgium, Denmark, Iceland, Norway, and Switzerland; and at number five in Hungary and Estonia. It also reached the top-ten in Finland, Greece, Portugal, and the European Top 100 Albums. To date, Merry Christmas was certified 4× Platinum in Denmark; 3× Platinum in Norway; 2× Platinum in Italy; Platinum in the Netherlands; and Gold in Austria, Germany, Iceland and Switzerland. In the United Kingdom, Merry Christmas peaked at number 32 on the UK Albums Chart, and it was certified Platinum. Additionally, Merry Christmas became the first Christmas album to reach number one on the UK R&B Albums chart, as the album topped the chart during the week of November 8, 2019, becoming Carey's eleventh number-one album on the chart, replacing Kanye West's Jesus Is King, and being replaced by Post Malone's Hollywood's Bleeding.

In Australia, the album peaked at number two, and was certified seven-times Platinum, denoting shipments of 490,000 copies and finishing 11th on the Australian Recording Industry Association (ARIA) 1994 End of Year Chart. Merry Christmas has sold 18 million copies worldwide, making it the best selling holiday album by a female artist in history. It also stands as one of the best selling holiday albums in world history.

== Legacy ==
According to Billboard, Merry Christmas is the most successful Christmas album of all-time. Journalists have described the album and Carey herself as being virtually synonymous with the Christmas season. The combined success of the album and its lead single, "All I Want for Christmas Is You", has led to Carey being nicknamed the “Queen of Christmas”. Various publications have ranked Merry Christmas among the greatest Christmas albums of all-time.

According to Alessandro Viapiana of L'Officiel Ibiza, the album "forever change[d] the face of Christmas music". Prior to Merry Christmas, holiday albums were often relegated to legacy projects by older artists whose careers were perceived to be in decline. Critics have credited Carey—who was early in her career at the time—with pioneering the release of Christmas albums among young artists, at a time when few contemporary pop artists considered it commercially viable. After Carey’s release, several mainstream artists issued their own holiday-themed albums, with Taylor Weatherby of Billboard describing the decade as "a gold mine for Christmas albums". Sal Cinquemani of the same publication said that, because of the album, "recording a holiday album became a rite of passage for almost every burgeoning pop star". Other artists have cited Carey’s work as an inspiration for creating Christmas music of their own, including Kelly Clarkson. Rachel Handler of Vulture wrote that, in the decades since its release, the album contributed to the near-ubiquity of “the Pop Star Christmas Album”, citing its influence on holiday releases by artists such as Michael Bublé, Ariana Grande, and Pentatonix, while deeming subsequent efforts inferior to Carey's album. Billy Nilles of E! Online agreed that Carey is “absolutely peerless in terms of impact and success, despite how many of her contemporaries have followed in her footsteps”. In 2020, journalist Jody Rosen called Carey “the 21st century’s answer to Bing Crosby”, describing her as the only artist to have produced original Christmas songs comparable to mid-20th-century classics.

Merry Christmas is credited with revitalizing and setting a new standard for contemporary pop Christmas albums. Critics have discussed the artistic merits of the album within the context of Carey’s career, with numerous theories offered as to why the album has endured. Musician Carlos Simon attributed this to a combination of vocal prowess, relatability, tradition, and genre-crossing appeal. Dan Hancox of The National argued that, rather than being groundbreaking upon release, the album’s success stems Mariah Carey recycling and updating a formula that had already been used by Christmas pop artists in the 1940s and 1950s. Emily Lordi of The New Yorker wrote that one of the album’s defining achievements is how it helped expand Carey’s reach among Black listeners through the singer's embrace of contemporary gospel music, while also relieving her from autobiographical songwriting expected of female singers at the time. Peter Piatkowski of PopMatters and Rich Juzwiak of Pitchfork agreed that the album allowed Carey to delve into her passion for gospel music, which had been largely suppressed in her earlier recordings up to that point. In 2019, Carey said that while she initially dissected and critiqued aspects of Merry Christmas, she had grown to accept it for what it is, describing her relationship with it as “better than it was when I first made the album”.

Some critics have written that Mariah Carey has effectively cultivated Christmas music—and the holiday itself—into a "second career". Journalist Kelsey McKinney said Carey proved that recording a Christmas album could be a lucrative career move. Beginning in the late 2010s, Carey began using social media to mark a countdown to the official start of the Christmas season, with fans often looking to her as a signal for its unofficial beginning, frequently declaring "it’s time!". At times, the success of the Christmas album has been said to overshadow the rest of Carey’s career. In 2010, Hancox said that despite Carey’s extraordinary success with non-Christmas albums, she remained most recognizable for her association with Christmas. Christina Wyman of HuffPost argued that Carey’s career deserves to be recognized for more than just Merry Christmas. However, Mariah Carey said that although she had at times worried that she would be known primarily for Christmas music, she ultimately would not mind due to her fondness for the holiday. Some of what has been perceived as Carey’s efforts to commercialize or capitalize on Christmas has been criticized, with some artists also pushing back against her attempt to trademark “Queen of Christmas”.

== Track listing ==
All tracks are produced by Walter Afanasieff and Mariah Carey, except where noted.

Original US edition
No.	Title	Writer(s)	Producer(s)	Length
1.	"Silent Night"	Franz Xaver Gruber; Joseph Mohr^{[u]}	Carey; Loris Holland	3:41
2.	"All I Want for Christmas Is You"	Carey; Afanasieff		4:01
3.	"O Holy Night"	Adolphe Adam		4:27
4.	"Christmas (Baby Please Come Home)"	Phil Spector; Jeff Barry; Ellie Greenwich		2:35
5.	"Miss You Most (At Christmas Time)"	Carey; Afanasieff		4:32
6.	"Joy to the World"	George Frideric Handel^{[t]}; Lowell Mason^{[t]}; Hoyt Axton		4:20
7.	"Jesus Born on This Day"	Carey; Afanasieff		3:42
8.	"Santa Claus Is Comin' to Town"	John Frederick Coots; Haven Gillespie		3:24
9.	"Hark! The Herald Angels Sing" / "Gloria (In Excelsis Deo)"	First title: Cummings after Mendelssohn / Second title: Traditional	Afanasieff; Carey; Holland^{[c]}	3:00
10.	"Jesus Oh What a Wonderful Child"	Traditional	Afanasieff; Carey; Holland^{[c]}	4:26
Total length:				38:09

International edition / Vinyl editions / 2019 deluxe anniversary edition (disc one)
No.	Title	Writer(s)	Length
11.	"God Rest Ye Merry, Gentlemen"	Traditional	1:19
Total length:			39:28

DualDisc — CD side bonus tracks
No.	Title	Writer(s)	Producer(s)	Length
11.	"God Rest Ye Merry, Gentlemen"	Traditional		1:19
12.	"Santa Claus Is Comin' to Town" (Anniversary Mix)	Coots; Gillespie	Carey; Jermaine Dupri	2:45
Total length:				42:13

DualDisc — DVD side
No.	Title	Writer(s)	Length
1.	"Santa Claus Is Comin' to Town" (Anniversary Mix)	Coots; Gillespie
2.	"All I Want for Christmas Is You"	Afanasieff; Carey
3.	"Miss You Most (At Christmas Time)"	Afanasieff; Carey
4.	"All I Want for Christmas Is You" (J.D. remix animated)	Afanasieff; Carey
5.	"Joy to the World" (Celebration Mix)	Handel; Mason; Axton
6.	"O Holy Night"	Adolphe Adam
7.	"All I Want for Christmas Is You" (black & white version)	Afanasieff; Carey
8.	"Joy to the World" (live at St. John the Divine)	Handel; Mason; Axton

2005 7-Eleven limited edition
No.	Title	Writer(s)	Producer(s)	Length
1.	"Silent Night"	Gruber	Carey; Holland	3:39
2.	"All I Want for Christmas Is You"	Carey; Afanasieff		4:01
3.	"O Holy Night"	Adam		4:27
4.	"Christmas (Baby Please Come Home)"	Spector; Barry; Greenwich		2:35
5.	"Miss You Most (At Christmas Time)"	Carey; Afanasieff		4:32
6.	"Joy to the World"	Handel; Mason; Axton		4:20
7.	"Santa Claus Is Comin' to Town" (Anniversary Mix)	Gillespie; Coots	Carey; Dupri	2:46
Total length:				26:19

Google Play 2015 exclusive version
No.	Title	Writer(s)	Producer(s)	Length
11.	"All I Want for Christmas Is You" (Mariah's New Dance Mix Edit 2009)	Carey; Afanasieff	Carey; Afanasieff; Low Sunday^{[r]}	3:35

2019 deluxe anniversary edition — Disc two
No.	Title	Writer(s)	Producer(s)	Length
1.	"Sugar Plum Fairy Introlude"	Pyotr Ilyich Tchaikovsky^{[t]}	Carey	0:44
2.	"All I Want for Christmas Is You" (live at the Cathedral of St. John the Divine)	Afanasieff; Carey		5:06
3.	"Silent Night" (live at the Cathedral of St. John the Divine)	Gruber		3:44
4.	"Joy to the World" (live at the Cathedral of St. John the Divine)	Traditional		5:40
5.	"Hark! The Herald Angels Sing" / "Gloria (In Excelsis Deo)" (live at the Cathedral of St. John the Divine)	Traditional		3:03
6.	"Jesus Born on This Day" (live at the Cathedral of St. John the Divine)	Afanasieff; Carey		3:46
7.	"Santa Claus Is Comin' to Town" (live at the Cathedral of St. John the Divine)	Traditional		3:27
8.	"Oh Santa!" (from Merry Christmas II You, 2010)	Mariah Carey; Jermaine Dupri; Bryan-Michael Cox	Carey; Dupri; Cox	3:31
9.	"Christmas Time Is in the Air Again" (from Merry Christmas II You)	Carey; Marc Shaiman	Carey; Shaiman	3:02
10.	"When Christmas Comes" (with John Legend) (from Merry Christmas II You)	Carey; James Poyser	Carey; Poyser	4:46
11.	"The Star" (from The Star, 2017)	Carey; Shaiman	Carey; Shaiman	4:01
12.	"Lil Snowman" (from All I Want for Christmas Is You, 2017)	Carey; Harvey Mason Jr.; Marvin Brodie; Johnny Marks	Carey; Mason Jr.	3:19
13.	"Santa Claus Is Comin' to Town" (Anniversary Mix)	Coots; Gillespie	Carey; Dupri	2:46
14.	"All I Want for Christmas Is You" (So So Def remix) (featuring Jermaine Dupri and Bow Wow)	Carey; Afanasieff; Arthur Baker; John Robie; Afrika Bambaataa; Robert Allen; Ellis Williams; Rolf Huetter; Emil Schultz	Dupri^{[r]}	3:44
15.	"All I Want for Christmas Is You" (Mariah's New Dance Mix Extended 2009)	Carey; Afanasieff	Carey; Afanasieff; Low Sunday^{[r]}	6:42
16.	"Joy to the World" (Celebration Mix)	Handel; Mason; Axton	Carey; Afanasieff; David Morales^{[r]}	8:00
17.	"Joy to the World" (Flava Mix)	Handel; Mason; Axton	Carey; Afanasieff; Morales^{[r]}	7:06
18.	"Sugar Plum Fairy Introlude" (acapella)	Tchaikovsky	Carey	0:41
Total length:				73:07

2019 deluxe anniversary edition — Disc two Japanese bonus track
No.	Title	Writer(s)	Length
19.	"All I Want for Christmas Is You" (live at the Tokyo Dome)	Carey; Afanasieff	4:55
Total length:			78:02

30th anniversary edition
No.	Title	Writer(s)	Length
12.	"All I Want for Christmas Is You" (live at the Cathedral of St. John the Divine)	Carey; Afanasieff	5:05
13.	"Silent Night" (live at the Cathedral of St. John the Divine)	Gruber	3:43
14.	"Joy to the World" (live at the Cathedral of St. John the Divine)	Handel; Mason; Axton	5:39
15.	"Hark! The Herald Angels Sing" / "Gloria (In Excelsis Deo)" (live at the Cathedral of St. John the Divine)	Traditional	3:03
16.	"Jesus Born on This Day" (live at the Cathedral of St. John the Divine)	Afanasieff; Carey	3:40
17.	"Santa Claus Is Comin' to Town" (live at the Cathedral of St. John the Divine)	Coots; Gillespie	2:48
18.	"Hero" (live at the Cathedral of St. John the Divine)	Carey; Afanasieff	4:24
19.	"Miss You Most (At Christmas Time)" (video version)	Carey; Afanasieff	4:31

Notes

- ^{^c} signifies a co-producer
- ^{^r} signifies a remixer
- ^{^t} signifies a composer incorrectly credited as traditional

Sample credits

- "Joy to the World" contains an interpolation of "Joy to the World" by Three Dog Night (1971)

== Personnel ==
Credits adapted from the album's liner notes.

Musicians

- 3D – children's choir (7)
- Mariah Carey – background vocals (6–8, 10), lead vocals
- Walter Afanasieff – claps (10), Hammond B-3 organ (3, 6, 8), keyboards (2–9), synthesizer (2, 3), tambourine (10)
- David Daniels – children's choir (7)
- Melonie Daniels – background vocals (1–10)
- Nathan Daniels – children's choir (7)
- Wayne Daniels Jr. – children's choir (7)
- Bernard Davis – drums (10)
- Omar Hakim – drums (4, 8)
- Loris Holland – Hammond B-3 organ (1, 9, 10), piano (1, 9, 10)
- Dann Huff – guitar (2–4, 6, 8)
- Randy Jackson – bass guitar (4, 8)
- Kirk Lyons – bass guitar (10)
- Cindy Mizelle – background vocals (9)
- Tobitha Shinique Owens – children's choir (7)
- Greg Phillinganes – piano (4, 8)
- Lenny Pickett – tenor and baritone saxophones (4)
- Kelly Price – background vocals (1–10)
- Shanrae Price – background vocals (1–10)
- David Silliman – percussion (4, 8)
- Janaye Walton – children's choir (7)
- Jazzmin Walton – children's choir (7)
- Jodi Walton – children's choir (7)
- Buddy Williams – drums (1)

Production

- Walter Afanasieff – drum and rhythm programming (2, 3), orchestral programming (5, 7, 9)
- Christopher Austopchuk – art direction
- Billy B. – make-up
- Dana Jon Chappelle – music recording (2–8)
- Gary Cirimelli – Macintosh, digital, and synthesizer programming (2–9)
- Robert Clivillés – drums, percussion, and bass programming (6)
- David Cole – drums, percussion, and bass programming (6)
- Brian Devine – hair
- Daniela Federici – photography
- Gus Garces – assistant engineering
- David Gleeson – assistant engineering (2, 7)
- Mick Guzauski – mixing
- Jay Healy – music recording (1, 9–11), vocal recording
- June Hong – design
- Bob Ludwig – mastering
- Mike Scott – assistant engineering
- Dan Shea – additional programming (2, 7)
- Andy Smith – assistant engineering
- Chris Theis – assistant engineering (11)
- T.D. Valentine – home photos
- Basia Zamorska – stylist

== Charts ==
=== Weekly charts ===
Weekly chart performance for Merry Christmas
Chart (1994–2025)	Peak position
Australian Albums (ARIA)	2
Austrian Albums (Ö3 Austria)	4
Belgian Albums (IFPI Belgium)	4
Canada Top Albums/CDs (RPM)	26
Canadian Albums (Billboard)	4
Canadian Albums (The Record)	21
Croatian Albums (HDU)	13
Danish Albums (Hitlisten)	4
Dutch Albums (Album Top 100)	2
Estonian Albums (Eesti Ekspress)	5
European Albums (Top 100)	9
Finnish Albums (Suomen virallinen lista)	6
French Albums (SNEP)	44
German Albums (Offizielle Top 100)	2
German Pop Albums (Offizielle Top 100)	2
Greek Albums (IFPI)	9
Hungarian Albums (MAHASZ)	4
Icelandic Albums (Tónlist)	4
Irish Albums (Official Charts)	29
Italian Albums (FIMI)	4
Italian Albums (Musica e dischi)	3
Japanese Albums (Oricon)	1
Japanese Hot Albums (Billboard Japan)	7
Latvian Albums (LaIPA)	1
Lithuanian Albums (AGATA)	1
New Zealand Albums (RMNZ)	6
Norwegian Albums (VG-lista)	4
Polish Albums (ZPAV)	5
Portuguese Albums (AFP)	9
Scottish Albums (Official Charts)	63
South African Albums (RISA)	19
South Korean Albums (Circle)	1
Spanish Albums (PROMUSICAE)	26
Swedish Albums (Sverigetopplistan)	2
Swiss Albums (Schweizer Hitparade)	4
Taiwanese Albums (Five Music)	1
UK Albums (Official Charts)	32
UK R&B Albums (Official Charts)	1
UK Albums (MRIB)	39
US Billboard 200	3
US Top Catalog Albums (Billboard)	1
US Top Holiday Albums (Billboard)	1
US Top R&B/Hip-Hop Albums (Billboard)	2
US Top 100 Pop Albums (Cash Box)	3

=== Year-end charts ===
Year-end chart performance for Merry Christmas
Chart (1994)	Position
Australian Albums (ARIA)	11
Dutch Albums (Album Top 100)	19
Japanese Albums (Oricon)	11
Norwegian Christmas Period Albums (VG-lista)	18
Swedish Albums (Sverigetopplistan)	59
Chart (1995)	Position
Australian Albums (ARIA)	38
Japanese Albums (Oricon)	13
US Billboard 200	21
US Top R&B/Hip-Hop Albums (Billboard)	45
Chart (1996)	Position
Australian Albums (ARIA)	55
US Top Catalog Albums (Billboard)	2
Chart (1997)	Position
US Top Catalog Albums (Billboard)	7
Chart (1998)	Position
US Top Catalog Albums (Billboard)	38
Chart (1999)	Position
US Top Catalog Albums (Billboard)	38
Chart (2000)	Position
US Top Catalog Albums (Billboard)	46
Chart (2001)	Position
Canadian R&B Albums (SoundScan)	179
Chart (2006)	Position
US Top Catalog Albums (Billboard)	50
Chart (2007)	Position
US Top R&B Catalog Albums (Billboard)	16
Chart (2008)	Position
US Top R&B Catalog Albums (Billboard)	24
Chart (2013)	Position
US Top Catalog Albums (Billboard)	41
Chart (2014)	Position
US Top Catalog Albums (Billboard)	48
Chart (2016)	Position
US Top Catalog Albums (Billboard)	46
Chart (2018)	Position
US Top R&B/Hip-Hop Albums (Billboard)	86
Chart (2019)	Position
US Billboard 200	191
US Top Catalog Albums (Billboard)	41
US Top R&B/Hip-Hop Albums (Billboard)	72
Chart (2020)	Position
Dutch Albums (Album Top 100)	91
Icelandic Albums (Tónlistinn)	89
US Billboard 200	168
US Top Catalog Albums (Billboard)	35
US Top R&B/Hip-Hop Albums (Billboard)	57
Chart (2021)	Position
Dutch Albums (Album Top 100)	73
Icelandic Albums (Tónlistinn)	89
US Billboard 200	178
US Top Catalog Albums (Billboard)	41
US Top R&B/Hip-Hop Albums (Billboard)	63
Chart (2022)	Position
Dutch Albums (Album Top 100)	65
Icelandic Albums (Tónlistinn)	87
US Billboard 200	176
US Top Catalog Albums (Billboard)	42
US Top R&B/Hip-Hop Albums (Billboard)	57
Chart (2023)	Position
Hungarian Albums (MAHASZ)	98
US Billboard 200	186
US Top R&B/Hip-Hop Albums (Billboard)	58
Chart (2024)	Position
US Billboard 200	185
US Top R&B/Hip-Hop Albums (Billboard)	50
Chart (2025)	Position
US Billboard 200	181
US Top R&B/Hip-Hop Albums (Billboard)	53

=== All-time charts ===
All-time chart performance for Merry Christmas
Chart	Position
US Top Holiday Albums (Billboard)	3

== Certifications and sales ==
Certifications and sales for Merry Christmas
Region	Certification	Certified units/sales
Australia (ARIA)	7× Platinum	490,000^{‡}
Austria (IFPI Austria)	Gold	25,000^{*}
Canada (Music Canada)	3× Platinum	300,000^{‡}
Denmark (IFPI Danmark)	4× Platinum	80,000^{‡}
Germany (BVMI)	Gold	250,000^{^}
Iceland (FHF)	Gold	2,500
Italy 1994-1995 sales	—	200,000
Italy (FIMI) sales since 2009	2× Platinum	100,000^{‡}
Japan (RIAJ)	2× Million	2,800,000
Netherlands (NVPI)	Platinum	100,000^{^}
New Zealand (RMNZ) pure sales	2× Platinum	30,000^{^}
New Zealand (RMNZ)	Platinum	15,000^{‡}
Norway (IFPI Norway)	3× Platinum	60,000^{‡}
Poland (ZPAV)	Platinum	30,000^{‡}
Singapore (RIAS)	Platinum	10,000^{*}
South Korea	—	523,503
Switzerland (IFPI Switzerland)	Gold	25,000^{^}
United Kingdom (BPI)	Platinum	320,000
United States (RIAA)	Diamond	10,000,000^{‡}
Summaries
Europe (IFPI)	Platinum	1,000,000^{*}
Worldwide	—	18,000,000
^{*} Sales figures based on certification alone.^{^} Shipments figures based on certification alone.^{‡} Sales+streaming figures based on certification alone.

== Release history ==
Release history and formats for Merry Christmas
Region	Date	Format(s)	Version	Distributor(s)	Ref.
Europe	October 28, 1994	CD (Compact disc)	International	Columbia	
United States	October 28, 1994	CD (Compact disc)	Standard	Columbia	
Japan	October 29, 1994	CD (Compact disc)	International	Sony Music Japan	
Australia	November 7, 1994	CD (Compact disc)	International	Columbia	
United States	October 17, 1995	CD Plus	Standard	Columbia	
United Kingdom	November 20, 1995	Cassette; CD; LP	International	Columbia	
United States	October 25, 2005	DualDisc	International + bonus track	Sony BMG	
Canada	December 5, 2005	CD	7-Eleven limited edition	Sony BMG	
United States	December 5, 2005	CD	7-Eleven limited edition	Sony BMG	
Europe	November 3, 2008	CD	International	Sony BMG	
Various	October 23, 2015	Vinyl (red)	International	Legacy	
Various	November 1, 2019	CD; digital download; streaming	25th Anniversary Deluxe Edition	Columbia; Epic; Legacy	
United States	October 30, 2020	Vinyl (Target exclusive clear with white, red, and green splatter)	International	Legacy	
United States	December 18, 2020	Vinyl (Urban Outfitters exclusive transparent red/green)	International	Legacy	
United States	December 13, 2024	CD; Cassette; Vinyl; Vinyl-2LP	30th Anniversary Deluxe Edition	Columbia	

== See also ==
- Merry Christmas II You
- List of best-selling albums by women
- List of best-selling albums in Japan
- List of best-selling Christmas albums in the United States
