= Laurie Carlos =

American dramatist (1949–2016)

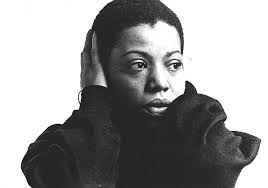
- Born: Laurie Dorothea Smith; January 25, 1949; New York City, U.S.
- Died: December 29, 2016 (aged 67); St. Paul, Minnesota, U.S.
- Occupations: Actress, playwright, director
- Years active: 1968–2016
- Children: Ambersunshower

Laurie Dorothea Carlos (née Smith; January 25, 1949 – December 29, 2016) was an American actress and avant-garde performance artist, playwright and theater director. She was also known for her work mentoring emerging artists in the theater.

== Early life ==
Carlos was born on New York City's Lower East Side; her father, Walter Smith, was a drummer for blues and R&B acts including B.B. King, Bo Diddley and Jackie Wilson, and her mother was an exotic dancer. At the age of 14, Carlos saw Gloria Foster perform in the documentary play In White America by Martin Duberman. As a result, Carlos said, "for the very first time I realized how much power the stage had politically, and I wanted that." Carlos graduated from the High School of Performing Arts and, at the age of 19, worked as a casting director for Harry Belafonte and others.

== Career ==
Carlos initially performed and worked in New York City, and joined the cast of Ntozake Shange's "for colored girls who have considered suicide when the rainbow is enuf" during its conceptual period in 1975 as the work performed at bars on the Lower East Side. She followed it on its journey from the New Federal Theater to the Public Theater to the Booth Theater on Broadway, and onward to a television adaptation seen on the PBS series American Playhouse in 1982, originating the role of Lady in Blue and appeared in the televised version of the play on PBS. She also appeared in the original company of Ntozake Shange's play Spell No. 7 and Edgar White's Les Femme Noir (also at the Joseph Papp Public Theater).

Carlos also frequently collaborated with dance companies, including the Urban Bush Women, and with them performed and co-created the works "Heat" and " Praise House" both on stage and on the televised version directed by Julie Dash. Carlos was also a theater director and playwright whose plays include White Chocolate (for My Father), The Cooking Show, Organdy Falsetto, Vanquished by Voodoo and Nonsectarian Conversations With the Dead. Her plays and performance pieces have been called "poetic, abstract, associative"; a "blending of history, poetry, mysticism and personal testimony" of "impressionistic language" and "haunting ancestral voices that balance images of brutality and agonizing struggle with those of endurance and continuity." She was a co-artistic director, with Marlies Yearby, of Movin' Spirits Dance Theater Company.

Mid-career, Carlos relocated to the Twin Cities of Minneapolis–Saint Paul during the 1990s, performing at the Walker Art Center and the Guthrie Theater. In 1998, she took a curatorial producing position at Penumbra Theatre Company. As part of her role, Carlos helped select scripts for the company to produce; one of her goals was to "bring more feminine voices into the theater." In addition, Carlos assisted emerging artists through Naked Stages, a fellowship for new talent. based at Pillsbury House Theatre.

Carlos also curated Pillsbury House's Late Nite Series, which showcased new works by artists from both New York and Minnesota. Some of the people she worked with moved on to particular success, such as Suzan-Lori Parks. Carlos's film and television credits include The Landlord directed by Hal Ashby, Fresh Kill, American Playhouse (TV Series: For Colored Girls Who Have Considered Suicide/When the Rainbow Is Enuf), and Praise House, directed by Julie Dash. Carlos collaborated with artists including contemporary dance company Urban Bush Women, Robbie McCauley, Don Meissner (composer) Jessica Hagedorn, David Murray (saxophonist), Sharon Bridgforth, Deborah Artman, Daniel Alexander Jones, Carl Hancock Rux, Erik Ehn, and Butch Morris. Carlos also served on the board of the Jerome Foundation.

Carlos's final performances was as the narrator in QUEEN (written by Erik Ehn and Junauda Petrus and directed by Alison Heimstead) at In the Heart of the Beast Puppet and Mask Theatre in Minneapolis, September 2016.St.Paul.

=== Awards ===
In addition to an Obie Award for her role in Ntozake Shange's for colored girls who have considered suicide / when the rainbow is enuf, and a Bessie Award for her work in Heat, Carlos received awards from the National Endowment for the Arts, Theatre Communications Group, and the New York Foundation for the Arts. She was also awarded a Bush Fellowship.

== Personal life and death ==
Carlos was the mother of Alternative Soul/R&B singer Ambersunshower (born Ambersunshower Nadine Milagros Villenueva Smith). Carlos was diagnosed with stage 4 colon cancer in September 2016 and died in the Sholom Home East Hospice in St. Paul, Minnesota, on December 29, 2016.
