= John Wineglass =

American television composer (born 1973)

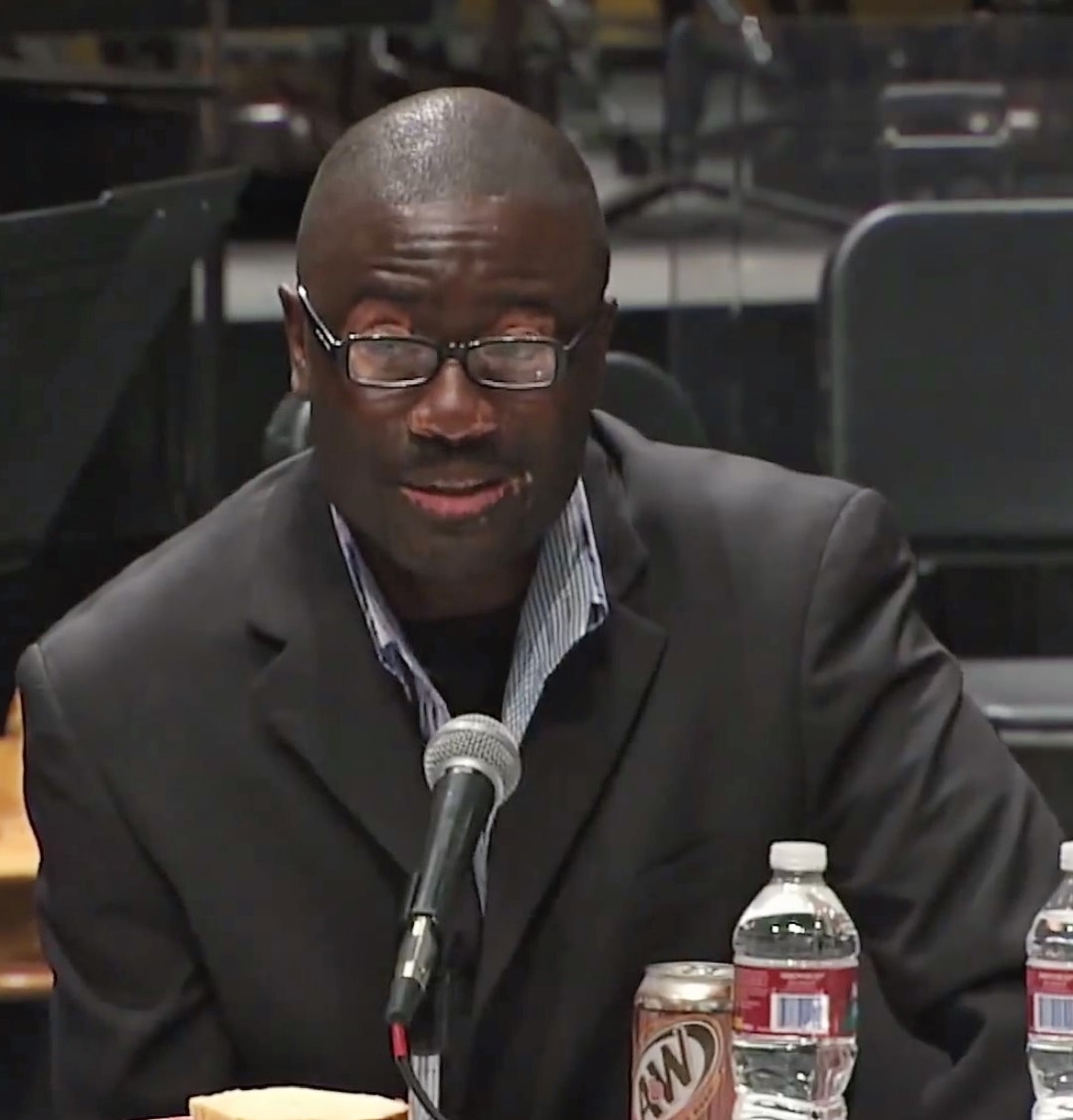
- Wineglass at the 2012 Cabrillo Festival of Contemporary Music
- Born: 1973 (age 52–53); Washington, D.C.
- Occupations: Television, Composer

John Christopher Wineglass (born 1973) is an American television composer.

== Biography ==
Wineglass was born in Washington, D.C., in 1973. He attended Langdon Elementary School. He played in the DC Youth orchestra in 1984, and ten years later he received a Bachelor of Music degree in Music Composition at the American University. He also earned a master's degree in Music Composition: Film Scoring for Motion Pictures, Television and Multi-Media at New York University, five years later.

== Awards and nominations ==
Wineglass has been nominated for six Daytime Emmy awards in the Outstanding Achievement in Music Direction and Composition for a Drama Series category, from 2001 to 2008, for his work on All My Children. He won the award in 2002, 2003, and 2005. His first nomination was shared with Terry Walker, A.J. Gundell, Jerry Pilato, Dominic Messinger, Gary Kuo, Mike Renzi, Brian Comotto, Loris Holland, Robbie Kondor, and Ron Goodman. His first win was shared with the previous, plus Peter Fish. Wineglass has also been nominated for three ASCAP Film and Television Music Awards, from 2002 to 2005.

== Credits ==
- All My Children
- The Making of a Film (2008)
- Doesn't Texas Ever End (2008)
- The Hunt (2008)
