= A Day in Black and White (film) =

1999 film by Desmond Hall

- Directed by: Desmond Hall
- Written by: Desmond Hall
- Produced by: David Von Ancken; Jon Gold
- Starring: Harold Perrineau; Stephanie Berry; Anthony DeSando; Francie Swift; Lonette McKee; Ron Cephas Jones; Joseph Siravo
- Music by: Loris Holland
- Release date: March 14, 1999
- Running time: 80 minutes
- Country: United States
- Language: English

A Day in Black and White is a 1999 American drama film written and directed by Desmond Hall.

== Synopsis ==
A young black writer, asked to write and present a speech on race relations, reaches out to a white friend for his input. As the two discuss the speech and the racial issues being addressed within it, their differences in views transform a friendly conversation into a heated debate. The pair continue their argument on and off throughout the day, as they discuss a variety of racially-charged topics, from the OJ Simpson trial to disco and interracial dating, with each other and a number of other characters.

== Cast ==
- Harold Perrineau as Black Man
- Anthony DeSando as White Man
- Stephanie Berry
- Francie Swift
- Lonette McKee
- Ron Cephas Jones
- Joseph Siravo

== Release ==
A Day in Black and White premiered at the SXSW Film Festival on March 14, 1999. The film was purchased by HBO and scheduled for a February 2001 broadcast premiere.

== Reception ==
A Day in Black and White received generally mixed to positive reviews. Jerry Renshaw of The Austin Chronicle wrote in his review that the film "manages to find fresh approaches to a very serious subject", calling it "a rare film that can take such an overheated subject and treat it in a witty, entertaining way, thought-provoking without being inflammatory". Godfrey Cheshire of Variety wrote A Day in Black and White was "(s)incere, insightful and sometimes flat-out hilarious", but stated "the pic suffers only from being a string of clever, topical dialogues rather than a fully fleshed narrative". Elvis Mitchell wrote in The Atlanta Journal-Constitution that the film "erred a bit on the side of didacticism, not trusting the acuity of the humor to get its points across"", but still referred to the film as "good stuff".

The film was a finalist for the Gordon Parks Award for Desmond Hall's direction in 1999.
