= Daniel Alexander Jones =

American dramatist

Daniel Alexander Jones (born 1970) is an American performance artist, playwright, director, essayist and educator.

== Birth ==
Jones was born on February 9, 1970, to Georgina Leslie Jones and Arthur Leroy Jones at Wesson Women's Hospital in Springfield, Massachusetts.

== Education ==
He studied at Classical High School and became a member of the first graduating class of Springfield Central High School in 1987. Daniel attended Vassar College, graduating with a degree in Africana Studies in 1991. He then pursued graduate study at Brown University, completing a master's degree in theatre in 1993. At Brown he studied with both John Emigh and Aishah Rahman.

== Career ==
Daniel Alexander Jones has created, to date, sixteen fully produced works of theatre and performance art, since beginning his professional career in 1994. His performance alter-ego, Jomama Jones, has been at the center of several of his works, including Black Light, a critically acclaimed performance piece commissioned by Joe's Pub's New York Voices program, that ran for six weeks in 2018 as part of The Public Theater's Astor Place 50th Anniversary Season, Duat, produced by Soho Rep in 2016, and Radiate, produced by Soho Rep in their 2010–2011 season. Jomama Jones has released four albums, to date, including the most recent, Flowering, in 2017. Jones's other plays and performance pieces include Phoenix Fabrik, Bel Canto, Bright Now Beyond, and An Integrator's Manual.

Jones built his early career in the Twin Cities, Austin, Boston, and New York City. Jones is a company member with Penumbra Theatre Company in St. Paul, MN; and an associate company member with Pillsbury House Theatre in Minneapolis. He was affiliated with the Theater Offensive in Boston and was a company member of Frontera@Hyde Park Theatre in Austin from 1995 until the company disbanded in 2001.

He is credited with making a significant contribution to the Theatrical Jazz Aesthetic, and was profiled alongside artists Laurie Carlos and Sharon Bridgforth in Dr. Omi Osun Joni L. Jones's book, Theatrical Jazz: Performance, Àṣẹ, and the Power of the Present Moment (Ohio State University Press).

In 2021, Jones launched Aten, the first in the ALTAREDSTATES series of multimedia digital performance pieces. The series was produced by CalArts Center for New Performance, commissioned by The Public Theater and New York Live Arts and is a New England Foundation for the Arts National Theatre Project Grantee.

On October 12, 2021, Jones will release a collection of his work, a book entitled Love Like Light: Plays and Performance Texts. The collection includes seven pieces and contributions from ten other artists.

== Awards and honors ==
In the year 2000 Jones received the Creative Capital Performing Arts Award. He was awarded the Alpert Award in the Arts in Theatre in 2006 in recognition of his work. Jones was named a USA Artist Award recipient in 2016. He received the Doris Duke Artist Award in 2015. Jones was also a Mellon Foundation Creative Research Fellow at the University of Washington, Seattle, from 2017 to 2019.

In 2019, Jones received the Helen Merrill Playwriting Award, and was awarded the Guggenheim Foundation Fellowship. Jones is a 2020 TED Fellow, and a 2021 PEN America/Laura Pels Theatre Awardee .

Additionally, he was a 2020-2021 Artist in Residence at the Center for the Art of Performance at UCLA, and is currently a Producing Artist at the CalArts Center for New Performance.

== Teaching ==
Jones was a Professor of Theatre at Fordham University on the Lincoln Center Campus from 2008-2022, attaining the rank of Tenured Full Professor. There he headed the undergraduate playwriting track, taught courses in playwriting, solo performance, theatre history, and, cross-listed with African American Studies, taught a course called Young, Gifted and Black which examined the lives and creative contributions of young artists in the Harlem Renaissance, Civil Rights Movement through to the current day. Jones previously taught at University of Texas at Austin, Goddard College, and the Massachusetts Institute of Technology.
