= Erik Ehn =

American playwright and director

Erik Ehn is an American playwright and director known for proposing the Regional Alternative Theatre movement. The former dean of theater at CalArts, the California Institute of Arts, he is the former head of playwriting and professor of theatre and performance studies at Brown University. His published works include The Saint Plays, Beginner, and 13 Christs.

Ehn is a playwright, educator and theorist of contemporary theater. Nearly a decade ago, he collaborated with Janie Geiser on Invisible Glass, which is itself inspired by Edgar Allan Poe's short story, "William Wilson." It premiered at the Roy and Edna Disney/CalArts Theater (REDCAT) in April 2005.

His play Maria Kizito is based on the 1994 genocide in Rwanda and is the result of his research in that Central African country. Its premiere launched Atlanta's 7 Stages 2004–05 season. Ehn's work includes The Saint Plays, an ongoing cycle of plays loosely based on the lives of the saints and biblical characters. Other plays include Book of Tink, Heavenly Shades of Night are Falling, No Time Like the Present, Wolf at the Door, Tailings, Beginner, Ideas of Good and Evil, 13 Christs and an adaptation of William Faulkner's The Sound and the Fury. Additionally, he co-wrote the musical Shiner with Octavio Solis. His dramas have been produced in San Francisco, Seattle, Austin, Dallas, New York City, San Diego, Baltimore, and Chicago. In 2004, he served as dramaturge on Peach Blossom Fan - the inaugural production by CalArts Center for New Theater at REDCAT.

Ehn's Soulographie: Our Genocides, a series of 17 plays, was presented as a two-day marathon at La MaMa in 2012. Together the plays examine the relationship of 20th century America to genocide in the United States, Central America, and East Africa. About half of the plays in the cycle incorporated puppetry. Although most of the plays in the cycle had previously been performed individually, the production presented them together for the first time.

Ehn is co-founder and co-artistic director, alongside Lisa Bielawa, of the Tenderloin Opera Company in San Francisco and also an artistic associate of San Francisco's Theatre of Yugen. He is a co-founder of the RAT Conference, an international network of alternative theaters. He was a recipient of the Alpert Award in the Arts in 2002 and a Whiting Award in 1997.

Ehn is the founder of an annual conference called "Arts in the One World," which brings together performing artists, scholars, and human rights activists to investigate theater on the subject of genocide and reconciliation. Ehn also travels to Rwanda and Uganda annually with students and other professionals, to explore the role of art in recovery from violence.
