= Wuzhen Theatre Festival =

Annual Chinese theater festival

Activity time
- Every October

Number of participants
- More than 5.6 million people

Creation date
- 2013

Founders
- Stan Lai, Chen Xianghong, Meng Jinghui and Huang Lei

The Wuzhen Theatre Festival (Chinese: 乌镇戏剧节; pinyin: Wūzhèn Xìjù Jié) is an annual theatre festival held in Wuzhen, Zhejiang, China. It is jointly sponsored by Stan Lai, Chen Xianghong, Meng Jinghui and Huang Lei, and hosted by Culture Wuhan Co., Ltd. The festival consists of four sections: Specially Invited Plays, Youth Theatre Artists Competition, Outdoor Carnival, and Wuzhen Dialogues.

== Introduction ==
Wuzhen, located in Tongxiang, Jiaxing City, Zhejiang Province, is the hinterland of the Hangjiahu Plain and belongs to the Taihu Lake Basin. On May 9, 2013, Wuzhen held the first theatre festival.

== Unit ==
The festival is held at the Youth Theatre People's Theatre Arena. The unit includes street performances, drama workshops, forums, and exhibitions intended for interaction between creators and audiences. International plays are invited to perform at various venues in Wuzhen.

== Past review ==
Name	Date of the event	Host address	Theme
The first Wuzhen Theatre Festival	2013.05.09-2013.05.11	Wuzhen	Reflection
The Second Wuzhen Theatre Festival	2014.10.30-2014.11.09	Wuzhen	Metamorphoses
The Third Wuzhen Theatre Festival	2015.10.15-2015.10.25	Wuzhen	Transmittal
The Fourth Wuzhen Theatre Festival	2016.10.13-2016.10.23	Wuzhen	Gaze Beyond
The Fifth Wuzhen Theatre Festival	2017.10.19-2017.10.29	Wuzhen	Luminosity
The Sixth Wuzhen Theatre Festival	2018.10.18-2018.10.28	Wuzhen	Magnanimity

=== The first festival ===
The first Wuzhen Theatre Festival was organized into three units: "Youth Theater Artists Competition", "Specially Invited Plays" and "Outdoor Carnival". The festival was supported by Stan Lai, Huang Lei, Meng Jinghui and Chen Xianghong.

In the Youth Theatre Artists Competition, plays submitted by drama enthusiasts were performed, with a jury selecting the top three. Chen Danlu received the "Best Individual Performance Award," while "Baba Mom" won the "Best Drama Award."

The shortlisted plays for the festival included titles such as "One Person’s Red Woolen Blanket," "Reflection," "Reflection Lake," "Untitled," "Virtuous He Luxi," "Time Machine," "One or the Other," "Darkness," "Wrong Words," "Toy Patient," "Baba Mom," and "Utopia Town."

The festival included a carnival with 120 art groups performing at Wuzhen Xizha.

=== The second festival ===
For its second edition, the Wuzhen Theatre Festival adopted the theme “Metamorphoses.” Like the first festival, it was sponsored by Stan Lai, Huang Lei, Meng Jinghui, and Chen Xianghong, and included the "Outdoor Carnival," "Specially Invited Plays," and "Youth Theatre Artists Competition."

The shortlisted plays for the second festival included "Determined Tin Soldier," "Grandpa's Adventures," "On the Self-growth of a Half-orc," "The Kidnapping," "The Silence of Urban Dream Walkers," "Monsters," "West," "If Leave," "Vienna • Spring Sacrifices," "Mountain House," "Circular Door," and "Original Initial."

=== The third festival ===
The Third Wuzhen Theatre Festival's theme was "Transmittal", and was divided into four units:“ Wuzhen Dialogues”,“Youth Theatre Artists Competition”,“Specially Invited Plays”and“Outdoor Carnival”, sponsored by Stan Lai, Huang Lei, Meng Jinghui, Chen Xianghong, hosted by Culture Wuzhen Co., Ltd. The 3rd Wuzhen Theatre Festival's closing drama was "Amazing Valley"

The Youth Theatre Artists competition resulted in "Static", "Ever Never" winning the Best Drama Award, Li Bo, the actor and screenwriter of "Tracing the Line" winning the Best Individual Performance Award, and "Remembrance Day" winning the Special Concern Award.

The Shortlisted Repertoire included Memorial Day, The Cenotaph, Zuo, Amnesia, Lianmu, Who Is Mad, Tracing the Line, Solo, Ever Never, Prometheus in the Tavern, Come Together, Static. While the Whuzhen Dialogues were a series of lectures.

=== The fourth festival ===
The Fourth Wuzhen Theatre Festival's theme was “Gaze Beyond”, and it consisted of four units: “ Wuzhen Dialogues”, “Youth Theater Artists Competition”, “ Specially Invited Plays” and “Outdoor Carnival”, a total of 22 works and 79 performances.

=== The fifth festival ===
The theme of the Fifth Wuzhen Theatre Festival was "Luminosity", it was held from October 19 to 29, 2017, 24 invited theatre from 12 countries and regions around the world, a total of 100 plays were performed in Wuzhen.

The shortlisted repertoire included: "Running Away From Home", "One And a Quarter", "Crowd", "Breaking the Sky", "Certain Hypothesis of Sustainable Development", "Temporary Stay in the Woods at a Snowy Night", "The Lost Turtle", "Moon”, "Full", "Killing Rabbit", "Er Yu", "New Platform", "Fade Away", "Normal Development", "Xuniang’s Dream", "Moon Tide", "Muchui" "Summer Evening"

=== The sixth festival ===
The Sixth Wuzhen Theatre Festival's theme was “Magnanimity”. It was held from October 18 to 28, 2018. 27+6 Specially Invited Plays from 17 countries and regions in the world performed in Wuzhen. There were four main units: Specially Invited Plays, Young Theatre Artists Competition, Outdoor Carnival, Wuzhen Dialogues.

The shortlisted repertoire included: "A bad arhat kills a fisherman", "Mournful birds cry", "Independent people whizzby", "Sleeping beauty wakes from a dream", "Desperado", "Little ants fly", "Natural Death interpreted", "Fragile diet-coke","Far away lies a beach", "Unbridled", "Fault-tolerant computing", "Thank you dear Ms. Xie wanting", "Go away", "Life on a banch keeps rolling", "Dark nights do not sleep", "Mystic river", "The crazy parrot dances", "Nearby, ripples plop".

The specially invited plays were: 19.14 written and directed by Alexander Molochnikov; Dancer in the Dark written by Patrick Ellsworth based on the film by Lars von Trier, and directed by Bastian Kraft; Springtime in the North written and directed by Tadashi Suzuki; and Jeden Gest (One Gesture) written and directed by Wojtek Ziemilski and Wojtek Pustoła.

== Award record ==
November 2017, the 2nd Boao International Tourism Communication Forum Tourism Communication Awards TC Award "Annual Tourism Marketing Activity List"

January 2018, Chinese cultural figures in 2017, Huang Lei, Stan Lai, Chen Xianghong, Meng Jinghui's "Wuzhen Theater Festival Founder Team"

== Shortlisted works of past terms of competition ==
Date	Shortlisted works
2013	"Tik Tok", "One or the Other", "One Person's Red Wollen Blanket", "Baba Mom", "Virtuous He Luxi", "Wrong Words", "Darkness", "Reflection", "Reflection Lake", "Time Machine", "Utopia Town"
2014	"Original Initial", "West", "Monster", "Grandfather’s Adventure", "Mountain House", "Circular Door", "Kidnapping", "The Silence of Urban Dream Walkers", "Determined Tin Soldier", "Vienna • Spring Sacrifice", "Jump Wall", "On the Growth of a Half-orc", "Toy Patient"
2015	"Amnesia", "Lianmu", "Who is Mad", "Memorial Day", "Cenotaph", "Zuo", "Prometheus in the Tavern", "Let's Come Together", "Still", "Red", "Solo", "Once Never"
2016	"Qin", "Peek", "Rubber Factory", "Remote", "Quiet Wall", "Shatangji", "Rolling Curtain", "Mirror", "The Lonely City", "Send to the End", "Because You Are a Camel", "Gama", "Overlook", "The Past and the Future", "Shanyang Sacrifice", "Waiting for Lord Godot"

== Other ==
=== Venue theatre ===
Chinese name: Wuzhen Theatre Festival,

Organizer: Culture Wuzhen Co., Ltd.

Location: Wuzhen, Tongxiang City, Jiaxing City, Zhejiang Province

Sponsor: Huang Lei, Meng Jinghui, Stan Lai, Chen Xianghong

=== Presidium ===
Founder and artistic director:Meng Jinghui

Founder and Festival Chairman:Chen Xianghong

Founder and Festival Director:Stan Lai

Founder and Producing Director:Huang Lei

Executive Director:Nai-Chu Ding

Managing Director:Chen Yu

=== Artistic committee ===
He Jiong, Liu Heng, Li Liqun, Pu Cunxin, Sun Honglei, Xi Meijuan, Yu Hua, Yuan Quan

=== Competition jury ===
Ding Naizheng, Yang Ting, Li Bo, Wu Bi, Stan Lai, Huang Lei, Shi Hang, Tian Qinxin, Zhou Liming
