= REDCAT =

Arts center inside the Walt Disney Concert Hall, Los Angeles

Coordinates: 34.055123°N 118.250547°W

Roy and Edna Disney CalArts Theater (REDCAT)
- Interactive map of Roy and Edna Disney CalArts Theater (REDCAT)
- Address: 631 W. 2nd Hope St. Los Angeles, United States
- Capacity: 270 (est.)
- Type: Theatre, gallery, art center

Construction
- Opened: 2003
- Architect: Frank Gehry

Website
- www.redcat.org

Roy and Edna Disney CalArts Theater (REDCAT) is an interdisciplinary contemporary arts center for innovative visual, performing and media arts in downtown Los Angeles, California, located inside the Walt Disney Concert Hall complex. Named for Roy O. Disney and his wife, it was opened in November 2003 as an extension of the California Institute of the Arts' mission into downtown Los Angeles.

== Programs ==
- Visual Arts
- Performing Arts
- Film/Video
- Music
- Conversations

== Facility ==
The art center consists of a 3,000-square-foot (280 m^{2}) gallery space, a 200–270-seat flexible black box theater, and a lounge/cafe/bar.

== History ==
As the Walt Disney Concert Hall began construction in 1992, Roy E. Disney, son of Roy O. and Edna Disney, saw an opportunity for the California Institute of the Arts (CalArts) in Santa Clarita to have a presence in downtown Los Angeles. With the financial support of The Walt Disney Company and the County of Los Angeles, the Concert Hall’s architect, Frank Gehry, whose children graduated from CalArts, was asked to design the new venue as part of the complex. Patty and Roy E. Disney personally matched the Disney Company’s gift and named the facility after his parents Edna and Roy O. Disney who built The Walt Disney Company with younger brother Walt, and after his death, ensured that his greatest wish and achievement, the construction and launching of CalArts' campus, was completed.

At the time of REDCAT’s conception in the early 1990s, then CalArts President Steven D. Lavine cited the pairing of experimentation in the arts with a public space for artist-community engagement as the primary consideration for the venue design and its role as a laboratory for the Institute. Lavine noted the Cottesloe Theatre in London as a model for its high caliber renegade experimentation. Lavine additionally expressed an institutional ambition for CalArts to contribute to the local community and participate in a broader dialogue about emerging forms of art and performance. The aim was to offer Los Angeles residents exposure to innovative art forms more consistently than occasional events (e.g. 1984 Olympic Arts Festival). Harvey Lichtenstein, then president and executive producer of the Brooklyn Academy of Music, was brought in as a consultant during the development phases of REDCAT in 1999.

After the initial search for a founding executive director proved elusive after the events of September 11, 2001 changed the national mood about the arts, Mark Murphy, originally considered for a more curatorial program director role for the theater space, was instead hired as the first executive director of REDCAT. Murphy observed a dearth of interdisciplinary art spaces in Los Angeles the likes of Yerba Buena Center for the Arts, Wexner Center for the Arts, and the Walker Art Center, or the Alte Oper in Frankfurt and the Hebbel am Ufer in Berlin. Given Murphy’s sole focus on the performing arts, Eungie Joo was hired in 2003 as the Gallery Director and Chief Curator for the gallery space. This bifurcated leadership start was the impetus that propelled initiatives for commissioned works, artist residencies, collaborations, and public programs for the Theater and Gallery as parallel and separate from each other rather than per its original conception as a unified laboratory of CalArts. Subsequent Gallery Directors and Curators after Joo were Clara Kim and Ruth Estévez.

Upon the departures of both Estévez and Murphy in 2018, the position of Executive Director of REDCAT was elevated to a CalArts senior leadership position (Vice President), reporting directly to the CalArts President. With this position change came the added responsibility for the management of all CalArts partnerships with cultural institutions in Los Angeles and beyond, further extending the professional laboratory work of the Institute into a global context.

An international search in 2019 resulted in the hire of João Ribas, the former Director of the Serralves in Portugal, to become the first CalArts Vice President for Cultural Partnerships & Executive Director of REDCAT, occupying the Steven D. Lavine Endowed Chair (given in honor of retired CalArts President Lavine, the founder of REDCAT). This change returned REDCAT to its founding concept as a multidisciplinary laboratory for artists with a unified program—performing and visual arts together—under one executive director with multiple curators working together as a team collaboratively to enable public engagement with experimentation in the arts.

== Initial Criticism ==
In the 2002 architecture book Gehry: The City and Music, Jeremy Gilbert-Rolfe, a former faculty member at CalArts, describes REDCAT as a performance space located within the Walt Disney Concert Hall. Gilbert-Rolfe notes that REDCAT's exterior stone appearance and orientation towards the back of the building makes it visually distinct from the metallic exterior of the Walt Disney Concert Hall complex. He uses this comparison to illustrate the social divide between artists performing at REDCAT versus those performing at the Walt Disney Concert Hall. Gilbert-Rolfe suggests that REDCAT can be seen pejoratively as an "entry-level" venue for aspiring artistic professionals looking to perform at more well-known venues like the Walt Disney Concert Hall. Gilbert-Rolfe's analysis was published prior to REDCAT's inaugural season in the fall of 2003. With the arrival of the Broad Museum, and the subsequent Grand Avenue Arts/Bunker Hill station of the LA Metro, REDCAT now occupies a "front door" to the entire Bunker Hill Arts area for those arriving via public transit.

In 2007, Los Angeles–based art critic Edward Goldman found himself driving by REDCAT and decided to see if there was an exhibition on display. Upon arrival, he noticed that the gallery did not use banners to announce their shows. Despite this, he took a chance and entered the galley. As the only person in the gallery, he noticed the art exhibit’s attendant appearing ambivalent to him as he entered the gallery. Noticing an exhibit on display, Goldman found the installation Falha (Failure) by Brazilian artist Renata Lucas to be austere, and there were no labels or wall text to explain the artwork. Uncertain if visitors were supposed to engage with the artwork, Goldman took a risk and walked across the plywood sheets (contents of the artist’s exhibit). Luckily, he discovered a pamphlet with an essay about the artist, but it was written in dense, inaccessible jargon, as he described it to be “favored by Artforum magazine and the CalArts in-crowd”. Seeking clarity, he asked the young attendant for help, who explained that Lucas wanted visitors to have a hands-on experience with her artwork. Despite this, Goldman determined that the exhibition's curator Clara Kim did not clearly communicate this intention to the public. Afterwards, Goldman left the exhibition with the impression of feeling like an “uninvited guest crashing the party”. In a 2013 TEDTalk, Goldman disclosed that WDCH's architect Gehry was the first art professional he met in Los Angeles when he initially immigrated to the United States.
