= Peter Fish (composer) =

American composer (1956–2021)

Peter Scott Fish (1956–2021) was an American musician and composer. He was a six-time Emmy Award winner.

Born in Providence, Rhode Island, Fish was the youngest of four children of Max and Ida Fish.

After starting his career touring with The Benny Goodman Band as a teenager, Fish moved to New York and became a composer for film and television. He founded National Sound in New York with his former wife, Jennifer Fish. Fish played with Ray Charles, CTA (California Transit Authority), Carly Simon, and his own band, The Peter Fish Group.

Fish wrote songs and theme music for Warner Brothers, CBS, NBC, PBS, HBO, and New York 1. He received 17 Emmy nominations with six wins. Fish was nominated for an Emmy for Best Original Theme Song for his composition, "Moment of Luxury" for the PBS series Moment of Luxury. He won Emmys for Best Original Score for All My Children and his work on Sesame Street,. He also received two Telly awards for CBS Eye on America and one for the VPI Commercial Campaign. Fish also received three ASCAP awards for Most Performed Composer. He recorded and conducted three original compositions commissioned by the Czech National Symphony in Prague.

Fish released two albums, Peter Fish, The Silver Apple, and Numbers. He arranged music for The Buddy Rich Band and The California Transit Authority.. In the past eight years Fish and his partner, Tracey Anarella, created films for her production company, A-Roll Pictures. Fish wrote the original music and did the audio post for all of her films and oftentimes shot second camera. The Austin Revolution Film Festival recognized Fish with the Best Soundtrack/Score award for Tracey's film, Not Black Enough.

In recent years, Fish was a frequent guest lecturer at the Berklee College of Music. He also began teaching piano and music theory to students worldwide on Zoom.
