= A. J. Gundell =

American musician and music director

- Occupations: Television, music director, musician

Andrew J. "A.J." Gundell is an American musician and music director. He has won 13 Emmy awards; his favorites being three in the "Outstanding Original Song" category.

== Credits ==
- All My Children
- The Guiding Light

== Discography ==
His songs have been recorded by country recording artists Kathy Mattea, Crystal Gayle, and Don Williams. Music critic Kris Wilson called Don Williams's recording of Gundell's song "Harry and Joe" "one of the twelve best songs recorded in Nashville" in 1998.

=== Albums and CDs ===
- Love On The Air
- A.J. Gundell collection

=== Singles ===
1. Sha La La La
2. Angel On My Shoulder
3. She Still Loves Me
4. Save A Little
5. I've Got No Complaints
6. The Wall
7. Mickey Mantle Hit One Out Today
8. Oxygen
9. Fool's Gold
10. Harry and Joe
11. Working On My Car
12. Out On A Limb
13. Hello In There

== Awards and nominations ==
Daytime Emmy awards:

- Won, 1991, Outstanding Original song for: "The Guiding Light" song, "Love Like This"
- Won, 1991, Outstanding Achievement in Music Direction and Composition for a Drama Series for: "The Guiding Light" (shared with Barbara Miller-Gidaly, Rob Mounsey, John Henry Kreitler, Richard Hazard, Barry De Vorzon, Theodore Irwin, and Jamie Lawrence)
- Won, 1992, Outstanding Original Song for: "The Guiding Light" song, "I Knew that I'd Fall"
- Won, 1992, Outstanding Achievement in Music Direction and Composition for a Drama Series for: "The Guiding Light" (shared with Barbara Miller-Gidaly, Barry De Vorzon, Richard Hazard, John Henry Kreitler, Theodore Irwin, Michael Licari, and Wes Boatman)
- Won, 1994, Outstanding Achievement in Music Direction and Composition for a Drama Series for: "The Guiding Light" (shared with Barbara Miller-Gidaly, John Henry Kreitler, Wes Boatman, Michael Licari, Dominic Messinger, Larry Hold, Richard Hazard, and Barry De Vorzon)
- Nominated, 1997, Outstanding Drama Series Directing Team for: "The Guiding Light" (shared with Conal O'Brien, James A. Baffico, Henry Kaplan, Jill Ackles, Andrew Lee, Barbara M. Simmons, Shirley Simmons, Paul F. Antonelli, Pamela Magee, Jim McDonald, Rusty Swope, Penny Bergman, and Tamara P. Grady)
- Nominated, 1998, Outstanding Drama Series Directing Team for "All My Children" (shared with Conal O'Brien, James A. Baffico, Robert Scinto, Casey Childs, Angela Tessinari, Karen Johnson, Barbara M. Simmons, Shirley Simmons, Paul F. Antonelli, Pamela Magee, Rusty Swope, Penny Bergman, and Tamara P. Grady)
- Nominated, 1999, Outstanding Drama Series Directing Team for "All My Children" (shared with James Baffico, Casey Childs, Conal O'Brien, Robert Scinto, Angela Tessinari, Karen Johnson, Barbara M. Simmons, Shirley Simmons, Terry Walker, Pamela Magee, Paul F. Antonelli, Penny Bergman, Tamara P. Grady, and Rusty Swope)
- Won, 1999, Outstanding Music Direction and Composition for a Drama Series for: "All My Children" (shared with Paul F. Antonelli, Pamela Magee, Dominic Messinger, Ron Goodman, Robbie Kondor, Mike Renzi, Terry Walker, and Gary Kuo)
- Nominated, 2000, Outstanding Drama Series Directing Team for: "All My Children" (shared with Conal O'Brien, Angela Tessinari, Robert Scinto, Casey Childs, Karen Johnson, Shirley Simmons, Barbara M. Simmons, Harriet W. Goldstein, Terry Walker, Jerry Pilato, Rusty Swope, Tamara P. Grady, and Penny Bergman)
- Nominated, 2000, Outstanding Achievement in Music Direction and Composition for a Drama Series for: "All My Children" (shared with Terry Walker, Jerry Pilato, Dominic Messinger, Mike Renzi, Gary Kuo, Robbie Kondor, and Ron Goodman)
- Nominated, 2001, Outstanding Drama Series Directing Team for: "All My Children" (shared with Conal O'Brien, Robert Scinto, Angela Tessinari, James A. Baffico, Casey Childs, Barbara M. Simmons, Shirley Simmons, Karen Johnson, Terry Walker, Jerry Pilato, Penny Bergman, Rusty Swope, and Tamara P. Grady)
- Nominated, 2001, Outstanding Achievement in music Direction and Composition for a Drama Series for: "All My Children" (shared with Terry Walker, Jerry Pilato, Dominic Messinger, Gary Kuo, Mike Renzi, John Wineglass, Brian Comotto, Loris Holland, Robbie Kondor, and Ron Goodman)
- Nominated, 2002, Outstanding Drama Series Directing Team for: "All My Children" (shared with Conal O'Brien, Robert Scinto, Angela Tessinari, James A. Baffico, Casey Childs, Barbara M. Simmons, Shirley Simmons, Karen Johnson, Terry Walker, Jerry Pilato, Penny Bergman, Rusty Swope, and Tamara P. Grady)
- Won, 2002, Outstanding Achievement in Music Direction and Composition for a Drama Series for: "All My Children" (shared with Terry Walker, Jerry Pilato, Dominic Messinger, Gary Kuo, Mike Renzi, John Wineglass, Brian Comotto, Loris Holland, Robbie Kondor, Ron Goodman, and Peter Fish)
- Nominated, 2003, Outstanding Original Song for: "All My Children" song "I Want You to Want Me" (shared with Jeffrey Gaines)
- Nominated, 2003, Outstanding Original Song for: "All My Children" song "This Déjà Vu"
- Won, 2003, Outstanding Drama Series Directing Team for: "All My Children" (shared with Conal O'Brien, Robert Scinto, Angela Tessinari, James A. Baffico, Casey Childs, Barbara M. Simmons, Shirley Simmons, Karen Johnson, Terry Walker, Jerry Pilato, Penny Bergman, Rusty Swope, and Tamara P. Grady)
- Nominated, 2004, Outstanding Original Song for: "All My Children" song "Tad The Cad" (shared with Peter Fish)
- Nominated, 2004, Outstanding Achievement in Music Direction and Composition for a Drama Series for: "All My Children" (shared with Terry Walker, Jerry Pilato, Gary Kuo, John Wineglass, Brian Comotto, Loris Holland, Brian Tarquin, Kim Oler, Peter Fish, Tom Spahn, and Jim Klein)
- Nominated, 2005, Outstanding Drama Series Directing Team for: "All My Children" shared with Conal O'Brien, Casey Childs, Angela Tessinari, Andrew Lee, Michael V. Pomarico, Barbara M. Simmons, Shirley Simmons, Anthony Pascarelli, Terry Walker, Jerry Pilato, Rusty Swope, Penny Bergman, and Martin Fritz Brekeller)
- Won, 2005, Outstanding Achievement in Music Direction and Composition for a Drama Series for: "All My Children" (shared with Terry Walker, Jerry Pilato, Gary Kuo, Dominic Messinger, R.C. Cates, John Wineglass, Brian Comotto, Loris Holland, Brian Tarquin, Kim Oler, Peter Fish, Tom Spahn, and Jim Klein)
