= Rick Rhodes =

Background information
- Born: July 28, 1951; Los Angeles, California, U.S.
- Died: November 2, 2005 (aged 54)
- Genres: Jazz
- Occupation(s): Musician, composer
- Years active: 1982–2005

Rick Rhodes (July 28, 1951 – November 2, 2005) was an American musician and television composer. His music for TV shows including Santa Barbara, Another World and Guiding Light won a total of five Emmy Award. In 2005, he died of brain cancer at the age of 54.

== Life ==
Born in Los Angeles on July 28, 1951, Rhodes learned to play the trombone and the piano during his teen years. As an adult, he toured the U.S. with his band, Wonder, but eventually settled with a television career in composing. He married screenwriter, novelist and lyricist Vivian Rhodes in 1982; they had two children, a son and a daughter. Rick and Vivian, together, produced two songs, "Let's Be Lovers Again" and "Fasten Your Seat Belts", which both received Emmy Award nominations. They also co-wrote the musical Ug; which was performed in California and off-Broadway in 2004.

Rhodes' songs have been recorded by many musicians, including Patti Austin, Diane Schuur, Tom Scott, Bill Champlin, and Joey Scarbury.

Rhodes was partners with actor Lane Davies, with whom he produced many productions for The Santa Susanna Repertory Company. Rhodes is perhaps best remembered for co-founding, with Davies, The Kingsmen Shakespeare Festival in Thousand Oaks, California. He was also the founder of The Performing Arts Department at Oak Park High School in Oak Park, California. During his career, Rhodes won six Emmy awards for his work on Santa Barbara, Guiding Light, and Another World.

Rhodes had planned to release another album in the summer of 2004, but was unable to because of a malignant brain tumor he had removed on September 5, 2003. Rhodes died on November 2, 2005, of a brain tumor at age 54. He was survived by his wife and children, his mother, and his sister. His memorial service was held on November 19 at the Samuelson Chapel at California Lutheran University in Thousand Oaks, California.

== Filmography ==
=== Composing ===
- Some Mother's Son (1996)
- Power and Beauty (2002)
- Guiding Light (1983)
- Family Ties (1982)
- Day by Day (1988)
- Peter Pan (1993)
- World of Aden: Thunderscape (1995)
- Fantasy General (1996)

=== Soundtrack ===
- Pajama Sam: No Need to Hide When It's Dark Outside (1996)
- Wild Things (1998)
- The Big Kahuna (1999)
- Drowning Mona (2000)
- Amy's Orgasm (2001)
- Rollerball (2002)
- Messengers (2004)
- Seed of Chucky (2004)

== Discography ==
=== Albums ===
- Now You See It (1994; original release)
- Now You See It (European release; 1994)
- Indian Summer (1995; original release)
- Indian Summer (European release; 1995)
- Deep In The Night (US re-release of Indian Summer; 1998)

=== Singles ===
1. Now You See It
2. Rumors
3. Let's Be Lovers Again
4. Promise In The Dark
5. Lies
6. Guardian Angel
7. People Like Us
8. Tropical Postcard
9. Don't Throw It All Away
10. The First Move
11. Unconditional Love
12. Deep In The Night
13. Hold Me
14. I On U
15. Eurotica
16. Hotstage Of Love
17. Indian Summer
18. Here Comes Another Fool
19. King Of Hearts
20. Touch Of Heaven

== Awards and nominations ==
Daytime Emmy Award:

- Won, 1988, Outstanding Achievement in Music Direction and Composition for a Drama Series for: Santa Barbara (shared with Liz Lachman and Dominic Messinger)
- Won, 1993, Outstanding Achievement in Music Direction and Composition for a Drama Series for: Santa Barbara (shared with Dominic Messinger and Jonathan Firstenberg)
- Won, 1995, Outstanding Achievement in Music Direction and Composition for a Drama Series for: Another World (shared with Carole Severson Weiss, Ron Brawer, Susan-Beth Markowitz, John Henry Kreitler, Wes Boatman, Barry De Vorzon, Richard Hazard, Robert Sands, and Edward Dzubak)
- Won, 1996, Outstanding Music Direction and Composition for a Drama Series for: Guiding Light (shared with Jonathan Firstenberg, Robyn Cutler, Michael Licari, Ron Cohen, John Henry Kreitler, Wes Boatman, Danny Lawrence, John E. Young, David Grant, Barry De Vorzon, Richard Hazard, Edward Dzubak, and Alan Bellink)
- Won, 1998, Outstanding Music Direction and Composition for a Drama Series for: Guiding Light (shared with Barbara Miller-Gidaly, Robyn Cutler, Brian Siewert, Ron Cohen, Richard Hazard, Barry De Vorzon, Michael Licari, Chieli Minucci, Jamie Lawrence, John Henry, and Wes Boatman)
- Nominated, 1999, Outstanding Music Direction and Composition for a Drama Series for: Guiding Light (shared with Robyn Cutler, Rhoda Farkas Rhodes, Robert Israel, Christina Loeb, Elizabeth Loeb, Brian Siewert, Ron Cohen, Richard Hazard, and Barry De Vorzon)
- Nominated, 1999, Outstanding Music Direction and Composition for a Drama Series for: As the World Turns (shared with Sybil Costello, Gary Deinstadt, Robert Bard, Billy Barber, Earl Rose, Danny Lawrence, and Jon E. Young)
- Nominated, 1999, Outstanding Music Direction and Composition for a Drama Series for: Another World (shared with Ron Brawer, James Kowal, Lanny Meyers, John Henry, Wes Boatman, Dominic Messinger, Robert Sands, Richard Hazard, Barry De Vorzon, Allan Bellink, Ed Dzuback, Mark Breeding, and Chieli Minucci)
- Nominated, 2000, Outstanding Achievement in Music Direction and Composition in a Drama Series for: As the World Turns (shared with Sybil Costello, Pamela Magee, James Kowal, Gary Deinstadt, Robert Bard, Billy Barber, Earl Rose, David Nichtern, Robert Sands, Ed Dzubak, Kevin Bents, Jamie Lawrence, and Bette Sussman)
- Nominated, 2000, Outstanding Achievement in Music Direction and Composition in a Drama Series for: Another World (shared with James Kowal, Pamela Magee, Dominic Messinger, Mark Breeding, Robert Sands, Ed Dzubak, Frederic Hand, Chieli Minnucci, Richard Hazard, Barry De Vorzon, Brian Siewert, John Henry, and Wes Boatman)
- Nominated, 2001, Outstanding Achievement in Music Directing and Composition in a Drama Series for: Guiding Light (shared with Robyn Cutler, Gary Deinstadt, Robert Israel, Brian Siewert, Chieli Minucci, Robert Sands, Robert Firpo-Cappiello, Dominic Messinger, and Birch Johnson)
- Nominated, 2002, Outstanding Achievement in Music Directing and Composition in a Drama Series for: Guiding Light (shared with Robyn Cutler, Gary Deinstadt, Brian Siewert, Chieli Minucci, Robert Sands, Birch Johnson, Ron Cohen, Robert Firpo-Cappiello, Dominic Messinger, and Robert Israel)
- Nominated, 2003, Outstanding Achievement in Music Direction and Composition in a Drama Series for: Guiding Light (shared with Robyn Cutler, Gary Deinstadt, Brian Siewert, Chieli Minucci, Robert Sands, Birch Johnson, and Robert Israel)
- Nominated, 2004, Outstanding Original Song for: Guiding Light (shared with Vivian Rhodes)
- Nominated, 2004, Outstanding Achievement in Music Direction and Composition in a Drama Series for: Guiding Light (shared with Robyn Cutler, Gary Deinstadt, Chieli Minucci, Brian Siewert, Robert Israel, Daniel Pelfrey, Jamie Lamm, Billy Barber, Ron Cohen, Birch Johnson, Gabriele Solarino, and Ron Komie)
- Nominated, 2005, Outstanding Achievement in Music Direction and Composition for a Drama Series for: Guiding Light (shared with Robyn Cutler, Gary Deinstadt, Daniel Pelfrey, Brian Siewert, Chieli Minucci, Jamie Lamm, Mark Stephen Ross, Kenneth Eberhard, Gabriele Solarino, Ron Komie, Daniel O. Baker, Billy Barber, Robert Israel, and Birch Johnson)
