= Chieli Minucci =

American guitarist (born 1958)

- Born: Gian Chieli Minucci; April 17, 1958 (age 68); Huntington, New York, U.S.
- Education: Ithaca College
- Genres: Jazz; world fusion; smooth jazz; new age
- Occupations: Musician; composer; producer
- Instrument: Guitar
- Years active: 1982–present
- Labels: Keytone; GRP; JVC; Shanachie; Trippin N' Rhythm; ChieliMusic
- Website: chielimusic.com

Chieli Minucci (born April 17, 1958) is an American guitarist who co-founded the band Special EFX. He has been nominated for multiple Daytime Emmy Awards, winning in 1998 for his work on Guiding Light.

== Early life ==
Minucci is the son of Ulpio Minucci. He grew up in Forest Hills, Queens from the age of eight, attending Public School 101, Russell Sage Junior High, and Hillcrest High. He attended Ithaca College before touring Europe alongside Carsten Bohn's Bandstand.

== Career ==
Working as a freelance guitarist, Minucci played for Rupert Holmes and Eartha Kitt before forming Special EFX in 1982 with Hungarian percussionist George Jinda. The band combined rock, Latin rhythm, and smooth jazz. When the duo separated in 1995, Jinda continued to perform under the name Special EFX. After Jinda's death in 2001, Minucci performed under the name Chieli Minucci and Special EFX. He has worked as a record producer and composer for Deborah Henson-Conant and Kim Pensyl, and as a sideman for Angela Bofill, Roberta Flack, Chaka Khan, Noel Pointer and Roseanna Vitro.

From 1990 to 1992, Minucci played various instruments in songs released by Henson-Conant on three albums: Caught in the Act, where he played guitar, electric guitar, drums, keyboards, and added harp effects; Talking Hands, where he played guitar, echo guitar, Surdo drums, keyboards, and provided fingersnap and hand clap effects; and Budapest, where he played guitar. In 1994, he released Jewels through JVC, the first album where he served as band leader. It was recorded in New York and New Jersey.

== Awards and honors ==
Minucci has been nominated for multiple Daytime Emmy Awards in the category of Outstanding Achivement in Music Direction and Composition for a Drama Series. In 2000, he was nominated for his work on Another World. He was nominated for his work on Guiding Light in 1998, 2001, 2002, 2004, 2005, 2007, and 2008. He won the award in 1998, 2007, and 2008.

Minucci learned his father died at the same time he learned he had received his eighth Daytime Emmy nomination.

His 2003 album Night Grooves ranked at number 25 on the Billboard chart for Contemporary Jazz Albums on release. The Special EFX song "Blue Lagoon" peaked at number two on the Smooth Jazz Songs chart after charting for nine weeks, on March 29, 2014, and "Deep as the Night" was the top Billboard Smooth Jazz Song of the Year for 2018.

Emmy honors for Chieli Minucci
Year	Work	Recipients	Result	Ref.
1998	Guiding Light	Wes Boatman; Ron Cohen; Robyn Cutler; Barry De Vorzon; Richard Hazard; James Elliott Lawrence; Michael Licari; Barbara Miller-Gidaly; Chieli Minucci; Rick Rhodes; Brian D. Siewert	Won	
2000	Another World	Wes Boatman; Ron Brawer; Barry De Vorzon; Ed Dzuback; Richard Hazard; John Henry; Susan-Beth Markowitz; Chieli Minucci; Rick Rhodes; Robert Sands; Carole Severson-Weiss	Nominated	
2001	Guiding Light	Supervising music director: Robyn Cutler; Music director: Gary Deinstadt; Composers: Robert Firpo-Cappiello; Robert A. Israel; Birch Johnson; Dominic Messinger; Chieli Minucci; Rick Rhodes; Robert Sands; Brian D. Siewert	Nominated	
2002	Guiding Light	Supervising music director: Robyn Cutler; Music director: Gary Deinstadt; Composers: Ron Alan Cohen; Robert Firpo-Cappiello; Robert A. Israel; Birch Johnson; Dominic Messinger; Chieli Minucci; Rick Rhodes; Robert Sands; Brian D. Siewert	Nominated	
2004	Guiding Light	Supervising music director: Robyn Cutler; Music director: Gary Deinstadt; Composers: Billy Barber; Ron Alan Cohen; Robert A. Israel; Birch Johnson; Ron Komie; Jamie Lamm; Chieli Minucci; Danny Pelfry; Rick Rhodes; Brian D. Siewert; Gabriele Solarino	Nominated	
2005	Guiding Light	Supervising music director: Robyn Cutler; Music director: Gary Deinstadt; Composers: Daniel O. Baker; Billy Barber; Kenneth Eberhard; Robert A. Israel; Birch Johnson; Ron Komie; Jamie Lamm; Chieli Minucci; Danny Pelfrey; Rick Rhodes; Mark Stephen Ross; Brian D. Siewert; Gabriele Solarino	Nominated	
2007	Guiding Light	Supervising music director: Robyn Cutler; Music director: Gary Deinstadt; Music director/composer: Billy Barber; Composers: Kenneth Eberhard; Ron Komie; Chieli Minucci; Danny Pelfrey; Mark Stephen Ross; Brian D. Siewert; David Trough	Won	
2008	Guiding Light	Supervising music director: Robyn Cutler; Music directors/composers: Gary Deinstadt; Billy Barber; Composers: Kenneth Eberhard; Ron Komie; Linda Lawley; Chieli Minucci; Danny Pelfrey; Mark Stephen Ross; Brian D. Siewert; Michele Vice-Maslin	Won	

== Discography ==
=== As leader ===
- Jewels (JVC, 1995)
- Renaissance (JVC, 1996)
- It's Gonna Be Good (JVC, 1998)
- Sweet on You (Shanachie, 2000)
- Night Grooves (Shanachie, 2003)
- Got It Goin' On (Shanachie, 2005)
- Solos, Duos, & Trios (ChieliMusic, 2008)
- Pop Today (ChieliMusic, 2008)
- Raspberry & Cream (ChieliMusic, 2008)
- Drippings (ChieliMusic, 2008)
- Travels (Watchfire Music, 2009)
- East of the Sun (Watchfire Music, 2009)
- Someone's Singing (Watchfire Music, 2022)

=== With Special EFX ===
- Special EFX (GRP, 1983)
- Modern Manners (GRP, 1985)
- Slice of Life (GRP, 1986)
- Mystique (GRP, 1987)
- Double Feature (GRP, 1988)
- Confidential (GRP, 1989)
- Just Like Magic (GRP, 1990)
- Peace of the World (GRP, 1991)
- Global Village (GRP, 1992)
- Play (JVC, 1993)
- Catwalk (JVC, 1994)
- Body Language (JVC, 1995)
- Masterpiece (Shanachie, 1999)
- Butterfly (Shanachie, 2001)
- Party (Shanachie, 2003)
- A Night with Chieli Minucci & Special EFX (Shanachie, 2006)
- Sweet Surrender (Shanachie, 2007)
- Without You (ChieliMusic, 2010)
- Genesis (Shanachie S405, 2013)
- Deep as the Night (Trippin 'n' Rhythm, 2017)
- All Stars (Trippin 'n' Rhythm, 2020)
- Twenty Twenty 2 (ChieliMusic, 2022)
- Return to Budapest with Love (ChieliMusic, 2024)

=== As sideman ===
With Anastacia

- Not That Kind (Epic/Daylight, 2000)
- Freak of Nature (Epic/Daylight, 2001)
- You'll Never Be Alone (Epic/Daylight, 2002)
- Pieces of a Dream (Epic/Daylight, 2005)

With Celine Dion

- Let's Talk About Love (Columbia, 1997)
- These Are Special Times (Columbia, 1998)
- I'm Alive (Columbia, 2002)
- A New Day Has Come (Columbia, 2002)
- One Heart (Columbia, 2003)

With Deborah Henson-Conant

- Caught in the Act (GRP, 1990)
- Talking Hands (GRP, 1991)
- Budapest (MCD Jazz, 1992)

With Chris Hinze

- Saliah (Keytone, 1984)
- African Dream (Keytone, 1991)
- Music for Relaxation (Keytone, 1992)

With others

- Marc Anthony, Mended (Columbia, 2002)
- Angela Bofill, Love in Slow Motion (Shanachie, 1996)
- Backstreet Boys, Millennium (GSM Music, 1999)
- B. B. & Q. Band, All Night Long (Capitol, 1982)
- B. B. & Q. Band, Six Million Times (Capitol, 1983)
- Bob Baldwin, Standing Tall (Narada, 2002)
- Jay Beckenstein, Eye Contact (Windham Hill, 2000)
- Tom Browne, R'N'Browne (Hip Bop, 1999)
- Will Downing, Invitation Only (Mercury, 1997)
- Roberta Flack, Oasis (Atlantic, 1988)
- Russell Gunn, Ethnomusicology Vol. 1 (Atlantic, 1999)
- Omar Hakim, We Are One (OzMosis, 2014)
- Lionel Hampton, For the Love of Music (MoJazz, 1995)
- Enrique Iglesias, Escape (Interscope, 2002)
- Jewel, Joy (Atlantic, 1999)
- Jennifer Lopez, On the 6 (Work, 1999)
- Cheryl Lynn, It's Gonna Be Right (Columbia, 1985)
- Marion Meadows, Player's Club (Heads Up, 2004)
- Kim Pensyl, Eyes of Wonder (GRP, 1993)
- Noel Pointer, Never Lose Your Heart (Shanachie, 1993)
- Nicole Renee, Nicole Renee (Atlantic, 1998)
- Rick Rhodes, Now You See It (Beverly, 1994)
- Rick Rhodes, Indian Summer (Beverly, 1995)
- Lionel Richie, To Love a Woman (Island, 2003)
- Jessica Simpson, Irresistible (Columbia, 2001)
- Kevin Toney, Strut (Shanachie, 2001)
- Nestor Torres, Mi Alma Latina (Shanachie, 2002)
- Gerald Veasley, Signs (101 South, 1994)
- Gerald Veasley, Love Letters (Inak, 1999)
- Roseanna Vitro, Catchin' Some Rays (Telarc, 1997)

=== Music library production ===
Music libraries for which Chieli Minucci has produced content
Year	Library	Credit/Title(s)	Ref.
1994	FirstCom	American Dream Vol. 2	
1995	FirstCom	Lifestyles	
1996	FirstCom	American Dream	
1997	Killer Tracks	The 60's Vol. 1	
1998–present	Gotham Library/Firstcom	Composer, performer music cues for television, movies, and radio	
1999	Sound Ideas / Westar Music Library	Second Cup	
1999	Sound Ideas / Westar Music Library	Neon Nights	
1999	De Wolfe Music	Latin Power	
1999	De Wolfe Music	Smooth Jazz #4	
2000–2001	Bloomberg Radio	Composed music, including the main station IDs	
2001	Sound Ideas / Westar Music Library	Sex & Romance	
2001	Sound Ideas / Westar Music Library	Manhattan Silhouette	
2002	Sound Ideas / Westar Music Library	X-Treme Sports	
2002	Sound Ideas / Westar Music Library	Over the Edge	
