= Richard Hazard =

American composer (1921–2000)

- Born: March 2, 1921; Trenton, New Jersey
- Died: December 20, 2000 (aged 79); Los Angeles, California
- Occupations: Conductor, composer, orchestrator, songwriter
- Spouse: Jeanne Taylor (1950–2000; his death)
- Children: 2

Richard Hazard (March 2, 1921 – December 20, 2000) was an American television composer, orchestrator, conductor and songwriter. He was born in Trenton, New Jersey, and died in Los Angeles, California, of cancer. He was married to Jeanne Taylor from 1950 until his death, and had two children.

== Credits ==
Hazard was sometimes credited as Dick Hazard or Richard P. Hazard.

=== Composer ===
- Between Two Brothers (1982)
- All Night Long (1981)
- With This Ring (1978)
- Nickelodeon (1976)
- Law and Order (1976)
- The Underground Man (1974)
- Some Call It Loving (1973)
- Mannix (1967–1972)
- Mission: Impossible (1969–1972)
- The Partners (1971)
- Company of Killers (1970)
- Calypso Joe (1957)
- Bela Lugosi Meets a Brooklyn Gorilla (1952)
- Radar Secret Service (1950)

== Awards and nominations ==
Daytime Emmy awards:

- Won, 1991, Outstanding Achievement in Music Direction and Composition for a Drama Series for: "The Guiding Light" (shared with Jamie Lawrence, Theodore Irwin, Barry De Vorzon, John Henry Kreitler, Rob Mounsey, A.J. Gundell, and Barbara Miller-Gidaly)
- Won, 1992, Outstanding Achievement in Music Direction and Composition for: "The Guiding Light" (shared with Wes Boatman, Michael Licari, Theodore Irwin, John Henry Kreitler, Barry De Vorzon, A.J. Gundell, and Barbara Miller-Gidaly)
- Won, 1994, Outstanding Achievement in Music Direction and Composition for a Drama Series for: "The Guiding Light" (shared with Barbara Miller-Gidaly, A.J. Gundell, John Henry Kreitler, Wes Boatman, Michael Licari, Dominic Messinger, Larry Hold, and Barry De Vorzon)
- Won, 1995, Outstanding Achievement in Music Direction and Composition for a Drama Series for: "Another World" (shared with Carole Severson Weiss, Ron Brawer, Susan-Beth Markowitz, John Henry Kreitler, Wes Boatman, Barry De Vorzon, Rick Rhodes, Robert Sands, and Edward Dzubak)
- Won, 1996, Outstanding Achievement in Music Direction and Composition for a Drama Series for: "The Guiding Light" (shared with Jonathan Firstenberg, Robyn Cutler, Michael Licari, Rick Rhodes, Ron Cohen, John Henry Kreitler, Wes Boatman, Danny Lawrence, John E. Young, David Grant, Barry De Vorzon, Edward Dzubak, and Alan Bellink)
- Won, 1998, Outstanding Achievement in Musical Direction and Composition for a Drama Series for: "The Guiding Light" (shared with Barbara Miller-Gidaly, Robyn Cutler, Brian D. Siewert, Ron Cohen, Barry De Vorzon, Michael Licari, Rick Rhodes, Chieli Minucci, Jamie Lawrence, John Henry, and Wes Boatman)
- Nominated, 1999, Outstanding Music Direction and Composition for a Drama Series for: "The Guiding Light" (shared with Robyn Cutler, Rhoda Farkas Rhodes, Robert Israel, Christina Loeb, Elizabeth Loeb, Brian D. Siewert, Ron Cohen, Rick Rhodes, and Barry De Vorzon)
- Nominated, 1999, Outstanding Music Direction and Composition for a Drama Series for: "The Guiding Light" (shared with Ron Brawer, James Kowal, Lanny Meyers, John Henry, Wes Boatman, Dominic Messinger, Rick Rhodes, Robert Sands, Barry De Vorzon, Allan Bellink, Ed Dzuback, Mark Breeding, and Chieli Minucci)
- Nominated, 1999, Outstanding Achievement in Music Direction and Composition for a Drama Series for: "Another World" (shared with James Kowal, Pamela Magee, Dominic Messinger, Rick Rhodes, Mark Breeding, Robert Sands, Ed Dzubak, Fred Hand, Chieli Minnucci, Barry De Vorzon, Brian D. Siewert, John Henry, and Wes Boatman)
