= Angela Tessinari =

American television director

Angela Tessinari is an American television director.

== Positions held ==
All My Children

- Director: 1997-2008, 2008-2011

As the World Turns

- Director: 2008

The City

- Director: 1995 - 1997

The Guiding Light

- Associate Director: 1989

Loving

- Associate Director: 19**

The Young and the Restless

- Director: January 16, 2012-

Days of Our Lives

- Director: 2015-

== Awards and nominations ==
Tessinari has been nominated for nine Daytime Emmy awards in the category Outstanding Drama Series Directing Team, for her work on The Guiding Light and All My Children. She was nominated from 1990 to 2008, and won once in 2003. Her first DE nomination was shared with Bruce S. Barry, Scott McKinsey, JoAnne Sedwick, Susan Dansby, Joanne Goodhart, and John O'Connell, while her win was shared with Conal O'Brien, Robert Scinto, James A. Baffico, Casey Childs, Barbara M. Simmons, Shirley Simmons, Karen Johnson, Terry Walker, A.J. Gundell, Jerry Pilato, Penny Bergman, Rusty Swope, and Tamara P. Grady.

She was also nominated for two Directors Guild of America awards in the category Outstanding Directorial Achievement in Daytime Serials, for her work on AMC. She was nominated in 2002 and 2004.
