= Wes Boatman =

American television composer

- Occupation: Composer

Wes Boatman is an American television composer.

== Biography ==
Boatman became interested in music at the age of six, and began playing such instruments as pianos and keyboards. During his adult years, he received a B.F.A. in Film and Electronic Music from the University of Cincinnati – College-Conservatory of Music. He has performed with artists such as Bootsy Collins, George Clinton and Midnight Star, on four Platinum and five Gold Records. He also toured with them around the world.

Boatman currently resides in Los Angeles, California, where he is writing and composing partners with John Henry Kreitler.

== Credits ==
- The Banger Sisters (2002)
- Material Girls (2006)
- Runaway with the Rich and Famous (1987)
- Riviera (1991)
- Melrose Place (1992)
- Lady Boss (1992)
- Loving (1995)
- Once a Thief (1996)
- Prime Suspects (1997)
- Fox Sports News (1995)
- Molly (1999)
- Wheel of Fortune (2000)
- Above & Beyond (2001)
- 20 Years of Must See TV (2002)
- The Guiding Light (1986–1998)
- Another World (1986–1998)
- Passions (1999)
- Brotherly Love (2000)
- Our Father (2001)
- The Elevator (2001)
- In the Net (2002)
- The Movement (2002)
- As the World Turns (1956–2008)

== Awards and nominations ==
Daytime Emmy Awards:

- Won, 1992, Outstanding Achievement in Music Direction and Composition for: "The Guiding Light" (shared with Barbara Miller-Gidaly, A.J. Gundell, Barry De Vorzon, Richard Hazard, John Henry Kreitler, Theodore Irwin, and Michael Licari)
- Won, 1994, Outstanding Achievement in Music Direction and Composition for a Drama Series for: "Another World" (shared with Barbara Miller-Gidaly, A.J. Gundell, John Henry Kreitler, Michael Licari, Dominic Messinger, Larry Hold, Richard Hazard, and Barry De Vorzon)
- Won, 1995, Outstanding Achievement in Music Direction and Composition for a Drama Series for: "Another World" (shared with Carole Severson Weiss, Ron Brawer, Susan-Beth Markowitz, John Henry Kreitler, Barry De Vorzon, Richard Hazard, Rick Rhodes, Robert Sands, and Edward Dzubak)
- Won, 1996, Outstanding Music Direction and Composition for a Drama Series for: "The Guiding Light" (shared with Jonathan Firstenberg, Robyn Cutler, Michael Licari, Rick Rhodes, Ron Cohen, John Henry Kreitler, Danny Lawrence, John E. Young, David Grant, Barry De Vorzon, Richard Hazard Edward Dzubak, and Alan Bellink)
- Won, 1998, Outstanding Achievement in Musical Direction and Composition for a Drama Series for: "The Guiding Light" (shared with Barbara Miller-Gidaly, Robyn Cutler, Brian D. Siewert, Ron Cohen, Richard Hazard, Barry De Vorzon, Michael Licari, Rick Rhodes, Chieli Minucci, Jamie Lawrence, and John Henry)
- Nominated, 1999, Outstanding Music Direction and Composition for a Drama Series for: "Another World" (shared with Ron Brawer, James Kowal, Lanny Meyers, John Henry, Dominic Messinger, Rick Rhodes, Robert Sands, Richard Hazard, Barry De Vorzon, Allan Bellink, Ed Dzuback, Mark Breeding, and Chieli Minucci)
- Nominated, 2000, Outstanding Achievement in Music Direction and Composition for a Drama Series for: "Another World" (shared with James Kowal, Pamela Magee, Dominic Messinger, Rick Rhodes, Mark Breeding, Robert Sands, Ed Dzubak, Fred Hand, Chieli Minucci, Richard Hazard, Barry De Vorzon, Brian D. Siewert, and John Henry)
- Nominated, 2001, Outstanding Original song for: "Passions" song "Brown-eyed Beauty" (shared with Steven J. Snyder and John Henry Kreitler)
- Nominated, 2001, Outstanding Achievement in Music Direction and Composition for a Drama Series for: "Passions" (shared with Paul F. Antonelli, Ed O'Donnell, and John Henry Kreitler)
- Won, 2004, Outstanding Achievement in Music Direction and Composition for a Drama Series for: "Passions" (shared with Ed O'Donnell, Paul F. Antonelli, and John Henry Kreitler)
- Won, 2007, Outstanding Original Song for: "Passions" song "Love is Ecstasy" (shared with John Henry Kreitler)
