= Barbara Miller-Gidaly =

- Occupation(s): Television, music director, music supervisor
- Spouse: Walter Gidaly (?–2003)

Barbara Miller-Gidaly, sometimes credited with her maiden name, Barbara Miller, is an American music supervisor and director. She was married to attorney and theatrical producer Walter Gidaly, until his death from a heart attack at age 75, on February 17, 2003.

== Credits ==
- Guiding Light (1992)
- Texas (1981)

== Awards and nominations ==
Daytime Emmy Awards:

- Won, 1991, Outstanding Achievement in Music Direction and Composition for a Drama Series for: "Guiding Light" (shared with A.J. Gundell, Rob Mounsey, John Henry Kreitler, Richard Hazard, Barry De Vorzon, Theodore Irwin, and Jamie Lawrence)
- Won, 1992, Outstanding Achievement in Music Direction and Composition for: "The Guiding Light" (shared with A.J. Gundell, Barry De Vorzon, Richard Hazard, John Henry Kreitler, Theodore Irwin, Michael Licari, and Wes Boatman)
- Won, 1994, Outstanding Achievement in Music Direction and Composition for a Drama Series for: "The Guiding Light" (shared with A.J. Gundell, John Henry Kreitler, Wes Boatman, Michael Licari, Dominic Messinger, Larry Hold, Richard Hazard, and Barry De Vorzon)
- Won, 1998, Outstanding Achievement in Music Direction and composition for a Drama Series for: "The Guiding Light" (shared with Robyn Cutler, Brian D. Siewert, Ron Cohen, Richard Hazard, Barry De Vorzon, Michael Licari, Rick Rhodes, Chieli Minucci, Jamie Lawrence, John Henry Kreitler, and Wes Boatman)
