= Lanny Meyers =

American composer, orchestrator, principal arranger and musical director

- Born: Brooklyn, NY
- Occupations: Composer, orchestrator, principal arranger, musical director
- Website: https://LannyMeyers.com

Lanny Meyers is an American composer, orchestrator, principal arranger and musical director. He has composed the ballet The Legend of Sleepy Hollow (Central Pennsylvania Youth Ballet and Oklahoma City Ballet), The Hunt of the Unique-Horn (Long Beach Ballet Co.), film scores for the 1992 Sundance Award winning documentary Beirut: The Last Home Movie, New Line Cinema's The First Time (1983), and many award-winning animated films for Buzzco Assoc. He arranged and orchestrated The Berenstain Bears Show TV series, and, (with Rupert Holmes), the cable TV series Remember WENN (1996). He also composed and orchestrated The Mendocino Music Festival Overture (2004), and created the score for the Psychosomatic Wellness CD by Dr. Candace Pert.

== Awards and nominations ==
=== Primetime Emmy awards ===
- Won, 1982, Outstanding Achievement in Music Direction for Night of 100 Stars (shared with Elliot Lawrence, William Elton, Tommy Newsom, Torrie Zito and Jonathan Tunick)
- Nominated, 1985, Outstanding Achievement in Music Direction for Night of 100 Stars II (shared with Elliot Lawrence, Torrie Zito, Tommy Newsom, Glen Roven, Lawrence James and William Elton)
- Won, 1986, Outstanding Achievement in Music Direction for The 40th Annual Tony Awards (shared with Elliot Lawrence, Jamie Lawrence, Tommy Newsom, Glen Roven, Lawrence Schwartz and Torrie Zito)
- Nominated, 1987, Outstanding Achievement in Music Direction for The 41st Annual Tony awards (shared with Elliot Lawrence, Larry Grossman, Wally Harper, Torrie Zito and Jamie Lawrence)
- Nominated, 1988, Outstanding Achievement in Music Direction for Irving Berlin's 100th Birthday Celebration (shared with Elliot Lawrence, Torrie Zito, Don Sebesky, Tommy Newsom, Jamie Lawrence, Lawrence Schwartz, Peter Matz, Larry Grossman, and Mark Hummel)
- Nominated, 1991, Outstanding Achievement in Music Direction for The 44th Annual Tony Awards (shared with Elliot Lawrence, Torrie Zito and Jamie Lawrence)

=== Daytime Emmy awards ===
- Won, 1982, Outstanding Achievement in Music Direction and Composition for a Drama Series for The Edge of Night TV series (shared with Jack Cortner)
- Won, 1982, Outstanding Individual Achievement, Scoring ABC Afterschool Special for "The Unforgivable Secret", Elliot Lawrence, composer
- Won, 1983, Outstanding Music Composition in Children's Programming, ABC Afterschool Special for "Sometimes I Dont Love My Mother" with Elliot Lawrence
- Won, 1995–96 Outstanding contributions to the Emmy Award winning Achievement for Outstanding Achievement in Music Direction and Composition for a Drama Series for Guiding Light
- Nominated, 1999, Outstanding Achievement in Music Direction and Composition for a Drama Series for Another World (shared with Ron Brawer, James Kowal, John Henry, Wes Boatman, Dominic Messinger, Rick Rhodes, Robert Sands, Richard Hazard, Barry De Vorzon, Allan Bellink, Ed Dzuback, Mark Breeding, and Chieli Minucci)

=== Other awards ===
- 5 CINE Golden Eagle Awards for scoring animated short films (1987, 1990, 1991, 1993 and 1995) (Buzzco Assoc.)
- Artist-in-residence, Wurlitzer Foundation, Taos, New Mexico
- New York State Council of the Arts
- Composer-in-residence, New York Electronic Workshop
- Graduate scholarship student of Lukas Foss (UCLA) and summer fellowship student at Brandeis University, Maryland.
