= Michael Licari =

- Occupations: Composer, songwriter

Michael Licari is an American television composer and songwriter. He has worked as a composer on the television series, "Deliver Me", documentary "Triple the Triplets" (2005). He has also worked as a song writer and performer on the 2007 film Charlie Bartlett (for the song "Nice Vibes"), and on the 1996 film The Long Kiss Goodnight, as an arranger (for the "Jingle Bells Marching Band"). He has also worked on award-winning drama series, "The Guiding Light", "Another World","As The World Turns", "Sunset Beach", and "Santa Barbara".

== Awards and nominations ==
Daytime Emmy awards:

- Won, 1992, Outstanding Achievement in Music Direction and Composition for: "The Guiding Light" (shared with Barbara Miller-Gidaly, A.J. Gundell, Barry De Vorzon, Richard Hazard, John Henry Kreitler, Theodore Irwin, and Wes Boatman)
- Won, 1994, Outstanding Achievement in Music Direction and Composition for a Drama Series for: "The Guiding Light" (shared with Barbara Miller-Gidaly, A.J. Gundell, John Henry Kreitler, Wes Boatman, Dominic Messinger, Larry Hold, Richard Hazard, and Barry De Vorzon)
- Won, 1996, Outstanding Music Direction and Composition for a Drama Series for: "The Guiding Light" (shared with Jonathan Firstenberg, Robyn Cutler, Rick Rhodes, Ron Cohen, John Henry Kreitler, Wes Boatman, Danny Lawrence, John E. Young, David Grant, Barry De Vorzon, Richard Hazard, Edward Dzubak, and Alan Bellink)
- Won, 1998, Outstanding Achievement in Music Direction and Composition for a Drama Series (shared with Barbara Miller-Gidaly, Robyn Cutler, Brian D. Siewert, Ron Cohen, Richard Hazard, Barry De Vorzon, Rick Rhodes, Chieli Minucci, Jamie Lawrence, John Henry, and Wes Boatman)
- Nominated, 2006, Outstanding Achievement in Music Direction and Composition for a Drama Series for: "As the World Turns" (shared with Bryan Lydell, James Kowal, David Nichtern, Kevin Bents, Jordan Lieb, George Whitty, Gary Kuo, Ed Dzubak, Jamie Lawrence, and Dominic Messinger)
