= The Pets (1950s band) =

- Years active: 1958 - 1959
- Label: Arwin Records
- Past members: Plas Johnson; Rene Hall; Richard Podolor; Earl Palmer

The Pets were formed in 1958 in Los Angeles, California from a group of top session players – saxophonist Plas Johnson, guitarist Rene Hall, guitarist Richard Podolor and drummer Earl Palmer.

== Background ==
They recorded their only hit "Cha Hua Hua" in 1958 for Arwin Records, owned by Marty Melcher, Doris Day's husband. "Cha Hua Hua" reached #34 on the Billboard Hot 100 in 1958.

Hugo & Luigi covered the song for Roulette Records in '58, however their more MOR version failed to chart. Subsequent releases by The Pets on Arwin went nowhere, however the individual members continued on as regular sessionmen, featuring on many classic recordings by a huge array of artists during the golden years of rock and roll.

Podolor eventually went on to work as an independent producer for a number of acts including Three Dog Night and Steppenwolf.

== Career ==
By May, 1958, while Arwin was still regarded as a new label, "Cha Hu Hua" bw "Cha-Kow-Ski" was out on Arwin 109. The reviewer in Billboard said it was one to watch. It would eventually reach #34 on the Billboard Hot 100 in 1958. Their next release on the label was backing a clean cut sounding powerful voiced singer, Seph Acre with "You Are My Love" bw "Rock And Roll Cha Cha". After that they released "Wow-Ee!!!" bw "Beyond The Sea". Their last single for 1958 was "Guitarro" bw "Whatever Will Be, Will Be". The next release involving them was backing B grade horror director and producer Jerry Warren who in 1956 turned out Man Beast and would later turn out Teenage Zombies. The record was released in 1959. The song "Monkey Walk" which Billboard described as bouncy rocker was about a new dance called The Monkey Walk. The B side "Street of Love" was a ballad with a beat.

An act with a Pets name on the Arwin roster had a release in 1964. The act was Pepe-Y-Los Pets with "Que Sera Sera: bw "Midnight Lace" on Arwin 126. It was an instrumental version of the Doris Day hit.

== Discography ==
Act	Title	Catalogue	Year	Notes #
The Pets	"Cha-Hua-Hua" / "Cha-Kow-Ski"	Arwin MM-109-45	1958	
Seph Acre The Pets	"You Are My Love" / "Rock And Roll Cha Cha"	Arwin MM-110-45	1958	
The Pets	"Wow-Ee!!!" / "Beyond The Sea".	Arwin MM-112-45	1958	
The Pets	"Guitarro" / "Whatever Will Be, Will Be"	Arwin MM-116-45	1958	
Jerry Warren with The Pets	"Monkey Walk" / "Street of Love"	Arwin MM-118-45	1959	
Pepe y los Pets	"Que Sera, Sera (Whatever Will Be, Will Be)" / "Midnight Lace"	Arwin MM-126-45	1964	
