= Gerald Veasley =

American bassist (born 1955)

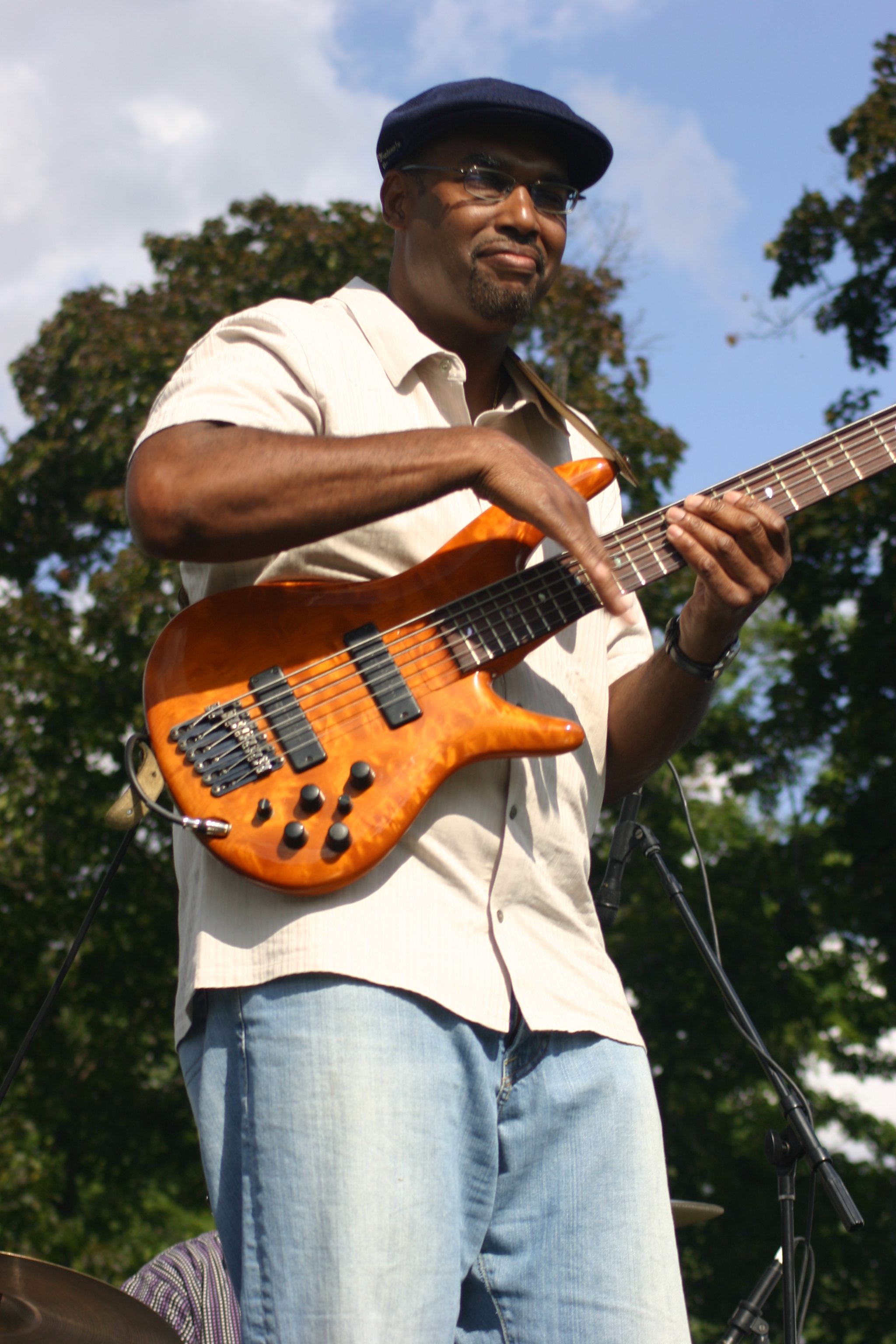
- Veasley in 2007

Background information
- Born: July 28, 1955 (age 71); Philadelphia, Pennsylvania, U.S.
- Genres: Jazz, jazz fusion, R&B
- Occupations: Musician, DJ
- Instrument: Bass guitar
- Years active: 1980–present
- Website: geraldveasley.com

Gerald Veasley (born July 28, 1955) is an American jazz bass guitarist.

Veasley was born and raised in West Philadelphia, where he played in R&B groups as a teenager. He received a bass guitar for Christmas from his dad when he was 12 years old and his relatives drove him to music lessons. A strong student, Veasley was attending the University of Pennsylvania with plans to go to get a Juris Doctor degree, but then his father died. After that, Veasley changed directions following his heart which was to pursue music. His uncle Ira Tucker, lead singer of the gospel quartet The Dixie Hummingbirds, took him under his wing providing him with work at the beginning of his career. Veasley also worked in an R&B revue-carnival run by his cousin and his cousin's wife, and from this experience learned what it would be like to be a musician.

In the early 80's Grover Washington Jr. asked Veasley to work with him. He then connected with Joe Zawinul from 1988 to 1995, and began releasing his own records in 1992, with his debut album Look Ahead on which both Washington and Zawinul appear. He has also done extensive work as a studio musician. His 2008 release Your Move hit No. 12 on the U.S. Billboard Top Contemporary Jazz Albums chart. Veasley has also worked as a smooth jazz DJ on WJJZ in Philadelphia.

== Bass Bootcamp ==
In 2002 Veasley founded his own Bass Bootcamp in Philadelphia with Roxanne Veasley and Lee Patterson. The camp has served over 700 bass players from all around world as well as other professionals like Marcus Miller, Stanley Clarke, Michael Manring, Victor Wooten, and many more. The camp lasts for 2 days and students are taught many important musical skills by the instructors such as: learning how to groove, creating bass lines, improving your ear, optimizing practice time, and playing live with a drummer. In addition, they also teach under music theory topics like covering scales, arpeggios, modes, etc., as well as an “All-Star Concert” which takes place at The Ardmore Music Hall featuring Gerald and various special guests.

== Collaborations ==
In 1988, Gerald joined a jazz fusion band called The Zawinul Syndicate featuring keyboardist Joe Zawinul, former member of the group Weather Report. The band blended the styles from many different cultures of music and combined tones of strange grooves, driving, swinging and toured from places like the U.S to Germany and continued on until the unfortunate death of Joe.

In June 1999, Gerald was featured playing bass on an album with Earth, Wind & Fire's Philip Bailey called Dreams. The album featured many artists such as George Duke, Marcus Miller, Pat Metheny, Gerald Albright, and many others. Veasley was featured on the song “Something To Remind You” with Duke and Metheny.

On April 1, 2008, Gerald was invited on stage as a guest with Victor Wooten, along with Anthony Wellington at The Keswick Theatre in Glenside, PA

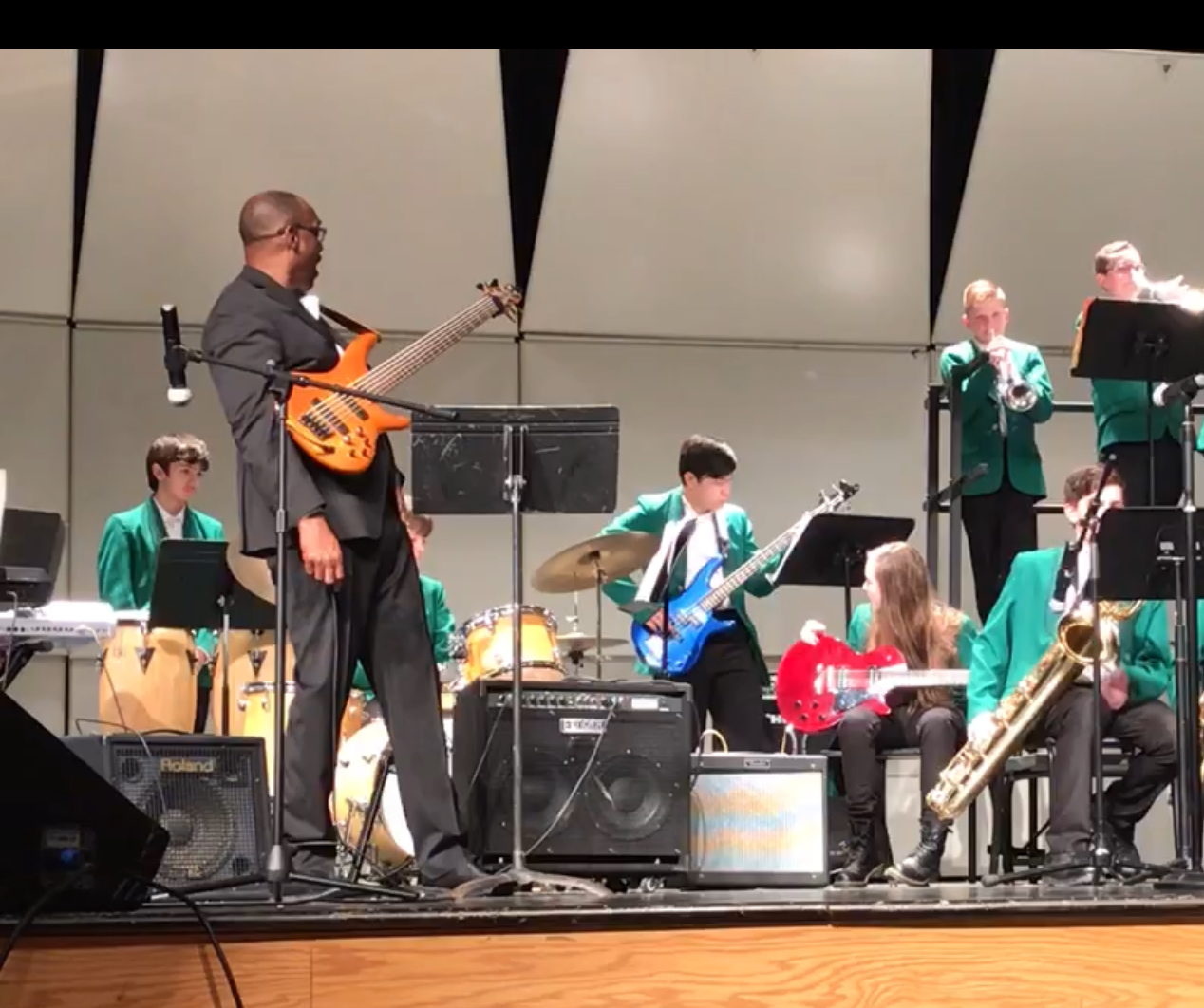
Gerald Veasley performing live with Jeremy Leafey

== Discography ==
=== As leader ===
- One Minute of Love (Gramavision, 1985)
- Look Ahead (Heads Up, 1992)
- Signs (Heads Up, 1994)
- Soul Control (Inak, 1997)
- Love Letters (Inak, 1999)
- On the Fast Track (Heads Up, 2001)
- Velvet (Heads Up, 2002)
- At the Jazz Base! (Heads Up, 2005)
- Your Move (Heads Up, 2008)
- Electric Mingus Project (Fanwave, 2011)

=== As sideman ===
With John Blake

- Twinkling of an Eye (Gramavision, 1985)
- Adventures of the Heart (Gramavision, 1987)
- A New Beginning (Gramavision, 1988)

With Odean Pope

- Almost Like Me (Moers Music, 1982)
- The Saxophone Shop (Soul Note, 1986)
- Out for a Walk (Moers Music, 1990)
- The Ponderer (Soul Note, 1991)
- Epitome (Soul Note, 1994)

With Special EFX

- Global Village (GRP, 1992)
- Play (JVC, 1993)
- Here to Stay (JVC, 1997)

With Grover Washington Jr.

- Strawberry Moon (Columbia, 1987)
- Then and Now (CBS, 1988)
- Time Out of Mind (Columbia, 1989)
- Next Exit (CBS/Sony, 1992)
- Soulful Strut (Columbia, 1996)
- Breath of Heaven (Columbia, 1997)

With others

- Chuck Anderson, Angel Blue (Anderson Music, 2002)
- Philip Bailey, Dreams (Heads Up, 1999)
- Jimmy Bruno, Midnight Blue (Concord Jazz, 2001)
- Suzanne Cloud, With a Little Help from My Friends (Dreambox, 2014)
- The Dixie Hummingbirds, Live in Philadelphia (Gospel AIR & Tapes, 1987)
- Nnenna Freelon, Tales of Wonder (Concord Jazz, 2002)
- George Jinda, Reliable Sources (JVC, 1991)
- George Jinda, George Jinda and World News (JVC, 1992)
- B.B. King, Here & There: the Uncollected B.B. King (Hip-O, 2001)
- Chuck Loeb, Between 2 Worlds (Heads Up, 2009)
- Bobby Lyle, The Journey (Atlantic, 1990)
- Jason Miles, To Grover with Love/Live in Japan (Whaling City Sound, 2016)
- Jaco Pastorius, Word of Mouth Revisited (Heads Up, 2003)
- Teddy Pendergrass, A Little More Magic (Elektra, 1993)
- Kim Pensyl, Eyes of Wonder (GRP, 1993)
- Phil Perry, The Heart of the Man (Capitol, 1991)
- Pieces of a Dream, Love's Silhouette (Heads Up, 2002)
- Harry Sokal, Voices of Time (Universal, 2005)
- Jamaaladeen Tacuma, The Night of Chamber Music (Moers Music, 1993)
- Jamaaladeen Tacuma, All Basses Covered (Moers Music, 2005)
- Mark Wood, Voodoo Violince (Guitar, 1991)
- Zawinul Syndicate, Black Water (Columbia, 1989)
- Zawinul Syndicate, Lost Tribes (Columbia, 1992)
