= John Henry Kreitler =

American composer (1948–2024)

John Henry Kreitler (February 6, 1948 – January 28, 2024), also credited as John Henry, was an American Emmy-winning composer of contemporary classical, film, television and theatre music. He was a songwriter, producer and publisher, and co-founder of contemporary chamber music ensemble Virtuosos de Cámara and founder and Creative Director of Clear Choice Entertainment, LLC.

== Biography and credits ==
Kreitler was born in Tillamook, Oregon on February 6, 1948. He held a B.A. in Composition from Lewis and Clark College, Portland, Oregon, where he studied violin, composition and conducting before continuing his studies in Composition at the College-Conservatory of Music, University of Cincinnati where he also taught theory.

His concert compositions included Symphony No. 1 – the Psalms for orchestra, chorus & schola cantorum, the two-act opera, Stefan-the Young, premiered in Portland, Oregon, two string quartets, and numerous works for chamber orchestra, chamber ensembles, chorus, mixed-media and electronics. His recent commissions had included “Canciones de Vallarta” a suite for cello and orchestra commissioned and premiered by retired Chicago Symphony Orchestra cellist Don Moline; and “Behold My Servant” for choir, organ, brass & percussion, commissioned by First Christian Church of N. Hollywood, CA. His “Perpetua” for a cappella chorus was a finalist in the 2019 Tokyo International Choral Competition. His Conversations Beyond the Stars for violin, flute and electronics - inspired by an astronomical phenomenon known as ‘fast radio bursts’ - was premiered in December, 2019, by American violinist Karen Bentley Pollick and German flautist Klaus Liebetanz at the XIV Festival International de Arte in San Pancho, Mexico and was recently performed as part of Stanford University’s CCRMA series.

Kreitler completed his Symphony No. 2, “The Voices of God,” shortly before his death. A commission by the Cincinnati Chamber Orchestra for its 50th anniversary, it is to be premiered Aug. 10.

Kreitler was composer-in-residence for Virtuosos de Cámara, an international chamber ensemble composed of performers from Mexico, Germany, Switzerland, Romania, Canada and America. The ensemble’s home base is Puerto Vallarta, Mexico, and is focused on presenting new chamber music, cross-cultural performances and music by Mexican composers. 2020 performances by members of the ensemble included premieres of several new works by Kreitler, including Sonata Andalusia for two violins; “Poets End Up Living Their Madness” a suite for piano, two violins, flute, clarinet/sax, percussion and electronics inspired by poems from Mexico; Fragility of Culture:Culture of Fragility; and his arrangement for the ensemble of the classic Mexican ballad by Manuel Ponce, Estrellita.

His film and television music has been heard by audiences in over thirty countries internationally. His credits for underscore, songs and/or source music included numerous U.S prime-time series such as Law and Order, Friends, Homicide, and Saturday Night Live; daytime dramas including Passions (NBC) and Guiding Light (CBS); the French drama Riviera; and films such as Material Girls (MGM) and Tribute (Lifetime).

Kreitler won ten EMMYs, and was awarded the prestigious BMI TV/Film Award ten times. He and his wife, percussionist/vocalist Patsy Meyer, divided their time between Los Angeles, Northern Kentucky and Puerto Vallarta, Mexico.

Kreitler died in Northern Kentucky on January 28, 2024, at the age of 75.

== Credits ==
=== Composer ===
- Passions (1999-2008)
- Law & Order (1990)
- Melrose Place (1992)
- Homicide: Life on the Street (1993)
- Lois and Clark: The New Adventures of Superman (1993)
- Saturday Night Live

=== Song Writer ===
- Material Girls (2006) (song: "Live Like I'm Rich")
- Tribute (Lifetime)

== Awards and nominations ==
Daytime Emmy awards:

- Won, 1991, Outstanding Achievement in Music Direction and Composition for a Drama Series for: "The Guiding Light" (shared with Barbara Miller-Gidaly, A.J. Gundell, Rob Mounsey, Richard Hazard, Barry De Vorzon, Theodore Irwin, and Jamie Lawrence)
- Won, 1992, Outstanding Achievement in Music Direction and Composition for: "The Guiding Light" (shared with Barbara Miller-Gidaly, A.J. Gundell, Barry De Vorzon, Richard Hazard, Theodore Irwin, Michael Licari, and Wes Boatman)
- Won, 1994, Outstanding Achievement in Music Direction and Composition for a Drama Series for: "The Guiding Light" (shared with Barbara Miller-Gidaly, A.J. Gundell, Wes Boatman, Michael Licari, Dominic Messinger, Larry Hold, Richard Hazard, and Barry De Vorzon)
- Won, 1995, Outstanding Achievement in Music Direction and Composition for a Drama Series for: "Another World" (shared with Carole Severson Weiss, Ron Brawer, Susan-Beth Markowitz, Wes Boatman, Barry De Vorzon, Richard Hazard, Rick Rhodes, Robert Sands, and Edward Dzubak)
- Won, 1996, Outstanding Music Direction and Composition for a Drama Series for: "The Guiding Light" (shared with Jonathan Firstenberg, Robyn Cutler, Michael Licari, Rick Rhodes, Ron Cohen, Wes Boatman, Danny Lawrence, John E. Young, David Grant, Barry De Vorzon, Richard Hazard, Edward Dzubak, and Alan Bellink)
- Nominated, 2001, Outstanding Original Song for: "Passions" song "I Could Live Without You" (shared with Patsy Meyer, and R. Jay Flippin)
- Nominated, 2001, Outstanding Original Song for: "Passions" song "No Puedo Olvidar" (shared with Grant Geissman and Ali B. Olmo)
- Nominated, 2001, Outstanding Original Song for: "Passions" song "Brown-eyed Beauty" (shared with Wes Boatman and Steven J. Snyder)
- Nominated, 2001, Outstanding Achievement in Music Direction and Composition for a Drama Series for: "Passions" (shared with Paul F. Antonelli, Ed O'Donnell, and Wes Boatman)
- Nominated, 2003, Outstanding Achievement in Music Direction and Composition for a Drama Series for: "Passions" (shared with Ed O'Donnell, Paul F. Antonelli, and Wesley B. Boatman Jr.)
- Won, 2003, Outstanding Original Song for: "Passions" song "Forever Near" (shared with Faith Rivera)
- Won, 2004, Outstanding Original Song for: "Passions" song "I Ain't Sorry" (shared with Pete T. Rich)
- Won, 2004, Outstanding Achievement in Music Direction and Composition for a Drama Series for: "Passions" (shared with Ed O'Donnell, Paul F. Antonelli, and Wes Boatman)
- Won, 2007, Outstanding Original Song for: "Passions" song "Love is Ecstasy" (shared with Wes Boatman)
