= Scinto =

Scinto (Italian pronunciation: [ˈʃinto]) is an Italian surname. Notable people with the surname include:

- Luca Scinto (born 1968), Italian cyclist
- Robert D. Scinto (born 1947), American real estate developer and convicted felon
- Robert Scinto (born 1946), American director
