= Lietzke =

Lietzke is a surname. Notable people with the surname include:

- Bruce Lietzke (1951–2018), American golfer
- Lisa Lietzke, fictional character
