= Liz Lachman =

American writer, director, and composer

Liz Lachman is an American writer, director, and composer. She has worked on such award-winning short films as Getting to Know You, Pandora's Box, and Puppy Love. Born in Detroit, she currently lives in Los Angeles. She is married to the chef Susan Feniger.

== Credits ==
=== Writing ===
- Getting to Know You (2005)
- Dante's Cove (2005)

=== Directing ===
- Getting to Know You (2005)

=== Music ===
- A Flintstone Family Christmas (1993)
- Puppy Love (2000)
- Damned River (1990)
- Lucky Day (1991)
- In the Arms of a Killer (1992)
- Gunmen (1994)
- The Glass Shield (1994)
- Capitol Critters (1995)
- The Babysitter (1995)
- Nightjohn (1996)
- The Wedding (1998)

== Awards and nominations ==
Golden Reel Awards:

- Nominated, 2000, Best Sound Editing - Television Animation - Music for: "Timon & Pumbaa" (episode "Steel Hog/Dealers Cut Choice") (shared with Brian F. Mars)
- Nominated, 2000, Best Sound Editing - Television Animation - Music for: "Timon & Pumbaa" (episode "Hot Air Buffoons") (shared with Fil Brown)
- Nominated, 2000, Best Sound Editing - Television Animation - Music for: "Mickey Mouse Works" (shared with William Griggs and Jason Oliver)
- Nominated, 2001, Best Sound Editing - Television Animation - Music for: "Pepper Ann" (shared with Nick Carr)
- Won, 2001, Best Sound Editing - Television Animation - Music for: "Mickey Mouse Works" (shared with Jason Oliver)
- Nominated, 2002, Best Sound Editing in Television - Music, Episodic Animation for: "House of Mouse" (shared with Jason Oliver)

Daytime Emmy awards:

- Won, 1988, Outstanding Achievement in Music Direction and Composition for a Drama Series for: "Santa Barbara" (shared with Dominic Messinger and Rick Rhodes)
