= Paul Antonelli =

American musician

- Born: Paul F. Antonelli; July 22, 1959 (age 66); Brighton, Massachusetts
- Occupations: Television; keyboardist; composer; music director; music supervisor
- Formerly of: Animotion; Radio Werewolf

Paul F. Antonelli (born July 22, 1959) is an American composer, musician, music director, and music supervisor. He began his career in the entertainment industry as a keyboardist and founding member of the 1980s synth-pop band Animotion, appearing in the music video for their signature hit, "Obsession".

After the first Animotion album, Antonelli departed the band and formed Radio Werewolf, who were featured in the 1988 film Mortuary Academy. Around this time, he began working on films scores, composing the music for Out of the Dark, China O'Brien and its sequel, and Dead On: Relentless II. He worked as a musical director or supervisor on the daytime soap operas General Hospital (1984–1985, 1991–1996), Santa Barbara (1985–1987), All My Children (1996–1998), Sunset Beach (1998–1999), Passions (2000–2008), As The World Turns (2009–2010), Days of Our Lives (2011–2024), Hollywood Heights (2012) and The Young And The Restless (2013–2017).

In 2014, Antonelli was the music supervisor for the soap opera web series Beacon Hill.

== Awards and nominations ==
Daytime Emmy awards:

- Won, 2004, Outstanding Achievement in Music Direction and Composition for a Drama Series for: "Passions" (shared with Ed O'Donnell, John Henry Kreitler, and Wes Boatman)
- Won, 1999, Outstanding Achievement in Music Direction and Composition for a Drama Series for: "All My Children" (shared with A.J. Gundell, Pamela Magee, Dominic Messinger, Ron Goodman, Robbie Kondor, Mike Renzi, Terry Walker, and Gary Kuo)
