= Firstenberg =

Firstenberg is a surname. Notable people with the surname include:

- Arthur Firstenberg (1950–2025), American author and activist
- Jean Picker Firstenberg, American non-profit executive
- Jonathan Firstenberg (born 1949), American television composer, music supervisor, producer and consultant
- Sam Firstenberg (born 1950), Israeli-American film director
