= Jonathan Firstenberg =

- Born: 1949 (age 76–77); Brooklyn
- Occupations: Television, composer, music supervisor
- Spouse: Natalie Hillman

Jonathan Firstenberg is an American television composer, music supervisor, producer and consultant.

== Biography ==
Jonathan Firstenberg was born in 1949 in Brooklyn, and grew up on Long Island, in Floral Park and Woodbury. Inspired by his parents, Firstenberg studied different varieties of music in his youth, and started playing rock and orchestral music with a violin and a guitar. When he graduated from college, Firstenberg started his career in music by taking a job with Hansen Music Publishing, in New York City.

He is married to Natalie Vicki (Hillman) Firstenberg, a transpersonal therapist and minister, specializing in healing through relationships, especially couples' counseling, and those who are longing to deepen their creative expression.

In 2005, Firstenberg auditioned and was recruited to lead the Universal Production Music Library, a division of Universal Music Publishing Group, as creative director. In this role, he is responsible for carrying out the vision and mission of Universal Music Publishing Group, CEO David Renzer and Scott James Sr. V.P. Licensing for Film and Television and New Technologies. Firstenberg stated in an interview that he hopes to inspire composers, songwriters, producers, musicians and vocalists to invest in their music efforts by placing some of their works into the library system.

I would say the best way to spend your time and money is to do ten things a day to get your music out there. Make ten phone calls a day. They might be nothing, or you might get lucky, but if you persist with the networking and getting your music out there, it does happen. It does happen. The fact is, if the music is good, it will rise to the top. It will make an appearance some place. Because there are people always looking for good music.

— Jonathan Firstenberg, summarizing the most important things about posting your music to a network.

== Credits ==
- Cats, Cops and Stuff (1990)
- Born to be Mild (1990)
- The Long Kiss Goodnight (1996)
- Santa Barbara
- Guiding Light
- Another World
- Capitol
- Days of Our Lives
- All My Children
- General Hospital

== Awards and nominations ==
Daytime Emmy Awards:

- Won, 1993, Outstanding Achievement in Music Direction and Composition for a Drama Series for: "Santa Barbara" (shared with Dominic Messinger and Rick Rhodes)
- Won, 1996, Outstanding Music Direction and Composition for a Drama Series for: "Guiding Light" (shared with Robyn Cutler, Michael Licari, Rick Rhodes, Ron Cohen, John Henry Kreitler, Wes Boatman, Danny Lawrence, John E. Young, David Grant, Barry De Vorzon, Richard Hazard, Edward Dzubak, and Alan Bellink)
