= Barbara Simmons =

American television director and editor

Barbara M. Simmons is an American television director and editor.

== Positions held ==
- Director on All My Children; 2000–2008
- Editor on All My Children

== Awards and nominations ==
Simmons has been nominated for 22 Daytime Emmy awards in the categories Outstanding Drama Series Directing Team, Outstanding Achievement in Multiple Camera Editing for a Drama Series, and Outstanding Achievement in Technical Excellence for a Daytime Drama Series, for her work on All My Children. She was nominated from 1982 to 2008, and won five times in 1982, 1995, 2001, 2003, and 2005. Her first win was shared with Joseph Solomito, Howard Zweig, Diana Wenman, Jean Dadario-Burke, Lawrence Hammond, Robert Ambrico, Larry Strack, Vincent Senatore, Jay Kenn, Trevor Thompson, Len Walas, Albin S. Lemanski, Charles Eisen Sr., Roger Haenelt, and Barbara Wood.
