= Cory Wells & The Enemys =

American band

- Origin: Los Angeles, California, U.S.
- Genres: Rock and roll
- Years active: 1965–1966
- Labels: Valiant Records; MGM Records
- Past members: Cory Wells; Mike Lustan; Dave Treiger; Cal Titus

Cory Wells & The Enemys are best remembered as a group fronted by Cory Wells before he joined up with Danny Hutton and Chuck Negron to form Three Dog Night.

== Origins ==
The story of The Enemys begins in Buffalo, New York in the mid-1960s, when vocalist Cory Wells joined a band called The Vibratos after leaving the U.S. Air Force. With the encouragement of the group’s manager, Gene Jacobs, Wells headed to Los Angeles along with Vibratos guitar player Mike Lustan and drummer Dave Treiger. The trio recruited bass player Cal Titus and renamed themselves Cory Wells & The Enemys.

The music scene that The Enemys entered into in Los Angeles in 1965/66 was thriving, with up-and-coming bands like The Byrds, Buffalo Springfield, The Doors, Love, The Rising Sons, The Leaves, The Music Machine, and Spirit filling the many clubs that had sprung up along Sunset Strip and the Hollywood area.

The Enemys landed their first gig at The Rag Doll on Coldwater Canyon and Victory Blvd, and would go on to play at all the big Hollywood clubs, including Ciro’s, The Crescendo, The Palomino Club, The London Fog, The Red Velvet, and Gazzarri's on the Strip, The Action on Melrose, Cinnamon Cinder on Ventura Blvd., and Danita’s in the Valley. Eventually The Enemys became the house band at the Whisky a Go Go for a lengthy engagement.

== Recordings, film and television appearances ==
The Enemys released their first single, Sinner Man, backed with Say Goodbye To Donna on Valiant Records in 1965. They moved to MGM Records for their next 45, Glitter And Gold / Too Much Monkey Business, produced by the legendary Tom Wilson.

For their third release, The Enemys teamed up with producer Danny Hutton to record a version of a song that had become a mainstay of the repertoire of nearly every band on the Strip in 1966, the Billy Roberts folk classic Hey Joe, backed with My Dues Have Been Paid.

The final Enemys record was the RnB rocker Mo-Jo Woman, which the group also performed on an episode of The Beverly Hillbillies, along with the song Oh, Pretty Woman and an instrumental number. The band also played an instrumental on an episode of the TV series Burke's Law and made an appearance in the teen exploitation movie Riot on Sunset Strip performing Jolene.

By 1967, The Enemys had split and Wells moved to Arizona. A year later he was back in Los Angeles where he reunited with Danny Hutton and formed Three Dog Night.

== Discography ==
Cory Wells & The Enemys – Sinner Man / Say Goodbye To Donna (Valiant V-714) 1965
The Enemys – Glitter And Gold / Too Much Monkey Business (MGM K13485) April 1966
The Enemys – Hey Joe! / My Dues Have Been Paid (MGM K13525) 1966
The Enemys – Mo-Jo Woman / My Dues Have Been Paid (MGM K13573) 1966
