= Valiant Records =

US record label

- Founded: 1960
- Country of origin: United States

Valiant Records was an independent record label distributed in the 1960s by Warner Bros. Records (and briefly by Four Star Television). The label was sold to Warner Bros. in 1967.

== History ==
Valiant Records was formed in 1960 in California, by singer−songwriter Barry De Vorzon and manager Billy Sherman.

Valiant charted with its first release, "Angel On My Shoulder" recorded by Shelby Flint. De Vorzon's own group, Barry and the Tamerlanes, hit in 1963 with "I Wonder What She's Doin' Tonight." Flint scored again in 1966 with a soft vocal version of "Cast Your Fate To The Wind."

In 1966 De Vorzon rescued folk-rockers The Association from their obscurity at Jubilee Records. They debuted on Valiant (which had just ended a brief distribution stint with Four Star Television, the distributor of such shows as Burke's Law and Honey West) with a non-charting version of "One Too Many Mornings." The next single records—"Along Comes Mary," "Cherish," "Pandora's Golden Heebie Jeebies," and "No Fair At All"—helped establish The Association as one of the premier Sunshine Pop groups of the 1960s.

== Demise ==
In 1967, after a little over 110 singles and 11 albums (seven under Warner Bros. and four under Four Star/independent distribution), the Valiant Records label itself ceased to exist and was folded into Warner Bros. Records. Its output remains desirable to collectors, with the early years featuring a string of obscure but worthwhile white pop titles, and the later years an intriguing mix of slick Southern California psych and pop.

== Label variations ==
=== Singles ===
- 1960–1966 (Warner Bros. distribution) – Purple labels with silver print
- 1966 (Four Star Television distribution) – Red label with black shield logo and "A SUBSIDIARY OF FOUR STAR TELEVISION" at the bottom perimeter of the label in either small or large letters
- 1966–1967 (Independent distribution) – Same as above but with either the Four Star byline covered by a black bar or removed altogether

=== Albums ===
- 1960–1966 (Warner Bros. distribution) – Purple or red labels with silver print
- 1966 (Four Star distribution – VLM 5001/VLS 25001 only) – Red label with black shield and white knight head logos and "A SUBSIDIARY OF FOUR STAR TELEVISION" in small letters at the bottom perimeter of the label
- 1966–1967 (Independent distribution) – Same as above but with either the Four Star byline covered by a black bar or removed altogether

=== Numbering series ===
On a collectors note, Valiant singles sported three separate numbering series. The very first Valiant release bore the catalog number 45-111. But that record, "Angel On My Shoulder" by Shelby Flint became too big a hit for the new label to handle so Warner Bros. Records picked it up with a new catalog number, 6001. For Warner distributed singles, the 6000 series (6001–6062) ran from 1960 to 1966, followed by the 700 series (700-739 under Four Star Television, 740-762 as an independent label) from 1966–1967. Some numbers from 6002 to 6013 were shared with Montclare Records, a very short-lived Warner subsidiary, as well as several one-shot labels such as Elloma and Burbank. The first five numbers of the Four Star series (701-705) were reissues of the most popular singles of the 6000 series. Six catalog numbers from the second series were unused: 706, 707, 708, 710, 722, and 746.

Albums were also given different numbering sets. The seven albums distributed by Warner Bros. were numbered from W/WS 401–407, the four albums under Four Star/independent were issued VLM 5001–5004 for mono, VLS 25001–25004 for stereo. Warner Bros. reissued the Four Star/independent albums using numbers W (mono)/WS (stereo) 1701–1704 in alignment with the original issues.

== Valiant Records artists ==
- The Association
- The Addrisi Brothers
- Barry & the Tamerlanes
- Perry Botkin, Jr.
- Charles Boyer
- J.J. Cale
- The Cascades
- The Collectors
- Danny & The Memories
- Shelby Flint
- The Grads
- Art Guy
- The Hollyhill Singers
- Dean Jones
- The Lost Ones
- Denny Provisor (Dennis Provisor of The Grass Roots)
- The Silvertones
- Singers, Inc.
- Cory Wells & The Enemys

== Unrelated labels also called Valiant ==
In 1960, record label owner Joe Banashak started a New Orleans–based Valiant label, but threats of a lawsuit by Warner Bros. prompted Banashak to rename the label Instant Records in 1961.

Valiant Records was also the name of an unrelated label headquartered variously in Swarthmore, Pennsylvania, and Bronx, New York, that re-released some albums originally issued on the Somerset Records label, largely for inexpensive supermarket and variety store distribution.

== See also ==
- List of record labels
- Record labels based in California
