= Barry & the Tamerlanes =

American doo-wop trio

Barry & the Tamerlanes were an American doo-wop trio from Los Angeles, California. Their 1963 single for Valiant Records, "I Wonder What She's Doing Tonight", spent 10 weeks on the Billboard Hot 100, peaking at No. 21, while reaching No. 23 on Billboard's Hot R&B Singles chart. "Barry" was Barry De Vorzon, who went on to considerable success as a film music composer; the group's other members were Ben Rocco, Terry Smith, and Bodie Chandler.
