= Billy Watkins (musician) =

American singer-songwriter

- Born: Robert Bartha L. Watkins; July 25, 1927
- Died: January 24, 2010 (aged 82) Inglewood, California, U.S.
- Genres: Soul, Gospel
- Occupations: Singer, Minister
- Labels: Arwin, Challenge, Chess, Era, Imperial, Kent, Victor
- Formerly of: The Zion Travelers

Robert Bartha L. "Billy" Watkins (July 25, 1927 – January 24, 2010) was a gospel and song singer who later became a Christian minister. He was also founder of the gospel singing group, The Zion Travelers. He recorded for the Arwin, Challenge, Chess, Era, Imperial, Kent and Victor labels.

== Background ==
Watkins was born to parents Bartha Lillard Watkins and Priscilla Kinard on July 25, 1927. When he was 11 years old, he and his family The family moved to California. A short time later Watkins was working in a barber shop shining shoes. While working there he met Nat King Cole who would have a significant influence on him. He was also a member of the gospel group, The Zion Travelers.

== Music career ==
=== The Zion Travelers ===
Known as Bartha L. Watkins, he was a member The Zion Travelers, a group that was formed in 1944 and first recorded in late 1947. Watkins was one of the lead singers. The other was L.C. Cohen. Other members were Tenors, L.W. Van and Garland Fate Mason, baritone singer Wesley Sherman and bass singer Felton Vernon. The group also recorded in the 1950s on Sultan Records and Aladdin Records. In 1954, they had a single "Moving Up King's Highway" bw "Where Is My Wandering Child" out on Score 5054. The B side was composed by Wakkins. They also had recordings released in the 1960s. Watkins may no longer been a member by then.

=== Solo ===
By October 1959, Wakins had a record out on the Challenge label. The record "You're Unforgettable" bw "Rendezvous" which Billboard predicted could do well was charting locally that year. Later he had another single released on Challenge. I was "Go Billy Go" bw "Good Times" in 1960. The A side was co-written with Tony Hilder and Charles Wright. By October 1966, he had "Little Things Mean a Lot" out on the Chattahoochee label which was a Hot 100 prediction.

Around 1970, Watkins was in Japan. He had an album released there on the Japanese Victor label. The album was Golden Soul & Country.

Having toured throughout the United States, Europe, the Orient and Australia, and having some chart success, it was in the early 1970s that he decided to make a change both musically and spiritually. So when he got back to the US, he decided to stay with gospel music.

== Ministry ==
He would later become an ordained pastor and establish the Freedom of Spirit Church, a non-denominational church in South Central Los Angeles. He also appeared regularly on television at Los Angeles' Christian television station KAGL.

== Death ==
Watkins died at Centinela Hospital Medical Center Medical at Inglewood California on January 24, 2010.

== Discography ==
Singles
Title	Catalogue	Year	Notes #
"Convince Me" / "This Is Me Loving You"	Arwin	1958	
"You're Unforgettable (After You've Been Kissed)" / "Rendezvous"	Challenge 59056	1959	
"The Good Times" / "Go Billy Go"	Challenge 59078	1960	
"Wanna Know" / "I Wanna Know" / "Where Is My Love"	Chess 1786	1961	
"Crackin' Up" / There Must Be a Reason"	Chess 1810	1961	
"My One And Only One" / "Calipso Twist) Tight Blue Jeans"	Jay Ree 2206	1962	
"Just For You (Stone Fox)" / "Beverly"	Kent K 411X45	1964	
"Baby For You (Stone Fox)" / "I'm Tired"	Chartmaker 405	1966	
"Little Things Mean A Lot" / "I'm Somebody's Love"	Chattahoochee CH-712	1966	
"The Ice-Man" / "The Blue And Lonely"	Era 3183	1967	
"Echoes" / "Somebody's Love"	Imperial 66371	1969	
"I'm Somebody's Love" / "Little Things Mean A Lot"	Robell 1001		
"The Rooster Smash" / "Gotta Have A Thing Going"	Jay Ree 101		
"Baby For You" / "I'm Tired"	Robell 2000 / 2001		
"The Ice-Man" / "The Blue And Lonely"	Era Back To Back Hits Series 45-BSN-624		
"Mother Of The Universe" / "When I Have Gone The Last Mile Of The Way"	Mother Of The Universe MOU-001		
"Merry Christmas To God" / "Didn't My Lord Deliver Daniel"	Tempe Records T-106		
"Judgements Comin'" / "Are You My Redeeming Saviour"	Schnipple - Up BW 001		

Albums
Title	Release info	Year	Notes #
Golden Soul & Country	Victor, JET JETLP 001	1970	
A Family Gathering For God	Tumps Music FGO	1978	

Appears on
Act	Album title	Catalogue	Year	Song	Notes #
Various artists	Spiritual Bread For The Aquarian Age	Tumps Music	197?	"The Lord Will Set You Free" "The Last Mile Of The Way"	Billy Watkins, The Spice of Life
Various artists	For Connoisseurs Only, Volume 2	Kent Soul CDKEND 251	2005	"Love Line"	
Various artists	For Connoisseurs Only, Volume 3	Kent Soul CDKEND 281	2007	"Beverly"	
