= The Cascades (band) =

American musical group

- Origin: San Diego, United States
- Genres: Pop music
- Years active: 1960–c. 1975/1976; 1995; 2004; 2005–2007
- Labels: Valiant; Warner Bros.; Liberty; RCA; Arwin
- Past members: John Gummoe; Eddie Snyder; David Szabo; Dave Stevens; Dave Wilson; Gabe Lapano; Ron Lynch; Tony Grasso

The Cascades was an American vocal group best known for the single "Rhythm of the Rain", recorded in 1962, an international hit the following year.

== Career ==
In 1960, the Silver Strands were a group of United States Navy personnel serving on the USS Jason (AR-8) based in San Diego, California. They recruited John Gummoe, who originally acted as manager. Then they left the Navy to become The Thundernotes. The group consisted of John Claude "John" Gummoe (born August 2, 1938) (lead vocals), Lenny Green (vocal and lead guitar), Dave Wilson (drums and vocal), Dave Stevens (bass), and Art Eastlick (rhythm guitar). Their first and only recording, "Thunder Rhythm" (and "Payday" on the reverse of the 45 rpm) was with DelFi Records of Hollywood, owned and managed by Bob Keane. It was a surf-type instrumental. Lenny left soon after to pursue his own goals and the group acquired Eddie Snyder (guitar), David Szabo (keyboards), Dave Stevens (bass) and Dave Wilson (drums).

Influenced by the Beach Boys, the group became more interested in vocal harmony. They recorded demos and signed with Barry De Vorzon at Valiant Records, a subsidiary of Warner Bros., and changed their name to The Cascades – inspired by a nearby box of dishwasher detergent. Their first release, "There's a Reason", became a minor regional hit; in the summer of 1962, they went to Gold Star Studios in Los Angeles to record a song Gummoe wrote in his Navy days on watch during a thunderstorm. The song was to become "Rhythm of the Rain" and the session musicians on the recording included the "Wrecking Crew" – including Hal Blaine on drums, Carol Kaye on bass, and Glen Campbell on guitar – arranged by Perry Botkin Jr. "Rhythm of the Rain" was issued in November 1962. It rose to No. 3 on the U.S. Billboard Hot 100 chart in early 1963, becoming a major hit in over 80 countries. It peaked at No. 5 in the UK Singles Chart. "Rhythm of the Rain" sold over one million copies, and was awarded a gold disc.

The Cascades continued to record, produced an album and several additional singles, including the follow-up "The Last Leaf", but did not match the charm or success of their big hit. The group continued to receive major radio airplay in their hometown, San Diego. The Cascades' cover version of Bob Lind's "Truly Julie's Blues" received spins on KCBQ and KGB in 1966, and their song "Maybe the Rain Will Fall" fared well on San Diego radio charts in mid-1969.

The group was active, played local San Diego clubs like The Cinnamon Cinder, and at other times, toured widely. In 1967, The Cascades appeared onscreen in the Crown International Pictures teen comedy adventure film, Catalina Caper, which included their version of a song written by Ray Davies of the Kinks, "There's A New World Opening For Me".

Gummoe left the group in 1967 to pursue a solo career and later formed the band Kentucky Express. Keyboardist/vocalist Gabe Lapano took over the lead chores. The group also added Tony Grasso, with Owens and Snyder the remaining original members. Finally, they split in 1975. Snyder later recorded country music under the name Eddie Preston.

Gummoe recorded a dance mix of "Rhythm of the Rain" in 1990. The group reformed twice, in 1995 and 2004, touring the US and the Philippines, where they retained a fan following.

A compilation CD of the Cascades' best moments was issued in 1999. That same year, performing rights organization BMI announced the "Top 100 Songs of the Century." to receive airplay on radio or television in the U.S., with "Rhythm of the Rain" at No. 9.

Guitarist Eddie Snyder (born 1941) died on January 28, 2023.

== Members ==
- John Gummoe (born August 2, 1938) – lead vocals, vibraphone, keyboards, percussion (1960?–1967, 1995, 2004, 2005–2007)
- Lenny Green – vocals, lead guitar (1960–1962)
- Art Eastlick – rhythm guitar (1960–1961/1962)
- Eddie Snyder (born 1941; died January 28, 2023) – guitar (1961/1962–1975?)
- David Szabo (born November 11, 1942) – keyboards (1961/1962–1967?)
- Dave Stevens – bass (1961/1962–1967?)
- Dave Wilson (born c. 1936; died November 14, 2000) – harmony and backing vocals, drums (1961/1962–1975?)
- Gabe Lapano – lead vocals, harmony and backing vocals, keyboards (c. 1967–1975?, 2005–2007)
- Tony Grasso (born c. 1942) – harmony and backing vocals, bass (c. 1967–1975?, 2005–2007)
- Chuck Crews – guitar, music director (c. 2005)
- Ron Lynch (c. 2005?)

== Discography ==
=== Albums ===
==== Studio albums ====
| Year | Album | Billboard 200 | Record label |
|---|---|---|---|
| 1963 | Rhythm of the Rain | 111 | Valiant Records |
| 1968 | What Goes on Inside | – | Blossom Records |
| 1969 | Maybe the Rain Will Fall | – | Uni Records |

==== Compilation albums ====
| Year | Album | Record label |
|---|---|---|
| 1999 | The Very Best of The Cascades | Taragon Records |
| 2001 | The Cascades: Hits and Rarities | Valiant Records |
| 2006 | All The Way To Yesterday | Warner Music Philippines |
| 2014 | Rhythms of Their Reign 1962-1966 | Teensville Records |

==== Remix albums ====
| Year | Album | Record label |
|---|---|---|
| 2007 | The Cascades Goes Ballroom: The Dense Modesto Remixes (with DJ Dense Modesto) | Warner Music Philippines |

=== Singles ===
| Year | Title | Peak chart positions | | | | | | | Record label | B-side | Album |
| Year | Title | US | AC | R&B | AUS | CAN | NZ | UK | Record label | B-side | Album |
|---|---|---|---|---|---|---|---|---|---|---|---|
| 1962 | "There's a Reason" | – | – | – | – | – | – | – | Valiant Records | "Second Chance" | Rhythm of the Rain |
| 1962 | "Rhythm of the Rain" | 3 | 1 | 7 | 2 | 1 | 2 | 5 | Valiant Records | "Let Me Be" | Rhythm of the Rain |
| 1963 | "Shy Girl" | 91 | – | – | – | 11 | – | – | Valiant Records | "The Last Leaf" (BB No. 60, AUS No. 94, CAN No. 11) | Rhythm of the Rain |
| 1963 | "My First Day Alone" | – | – | – | – | – | – | – | Valiant Records | "I Wanna Be Your Lover" | Rhythm of the Rain |
| 1963 | "A Little Like Lovin'" | 116 | – | – | – | – | – | – | RCA Victor | "Cinderella" | Non-album singles |
| 1963 | "For Your Sweet Love" | 86 | – | – | – | – | – | – | RCA Victor | "Jeannie" | Non-album singles |
| 1964 | "Those Were the Good Old Days" | – | – | – | – | – | – | – | RCA Victor | "Little Betty Falling Star" | Non-album singles |
| 1964 | "I Dare You to Try" | – | – | – | – | – | – | – | RCA Victor | "Awake" | Non-album singles |
| 1964 | "She Was Never Really Mine (to Lose)" | – | – | – | – | – | – | – | Charter Records | "My Best Girl" | Non-album singles |
| 1965 | "She'll Love Again" | – | – | – | – | – | – | – | Liberty Records | "I Bet You Won't Stay" | Non-album singles |
| 1966 | "Cheryl's Goin' Home" | 131 | – | – | – | – | – | – | Arwin Records | "Truly Julie's Blues" | Non-album singles |
| 1966 | "All's Fair in Love and War" | – | – | – | – | – | – | – | Arwin Records | "Midnight Lace" | Non-album singles |
| 1967 | "Hey Little Girl of Mine" | – | – | – | – | – | – | – | Smash Records | "Blue Hours" | Non-album singles |
| 1967 | "Flying on the Ground" | – | – | – | – | – | – | – | Smash Records | "Main Street" | Non-album singles |
| 1969 | "Two Sided Man" | – | – | – | – | – | – | – | Probe Records | "Everyone Is Blossoming" | What Goes on Inside |
| 1969 | "Maybe the Rain Will Fall" | 61 | – | – | – | 39 | – | – | Uni Records | "Naggin' Cries" | Maybe the Rain Will Fall |
| 1969 | "Indian River" | – | – | – | – | – | – | – | Uni Records | "Floatin Down River" | Maybe the Rain Will Fall |
| 1970 | "But for Love" | – | – | – | – | – | – | – | Uni Records | "Hazel Autumn Cocoa Brown" | Maybe the Rain Will Fall |
| 1970 | "Big Ugly Sky" | – | – | – | – | – | – | – | Uni Records | "April, May, June and July" | Non-album singles |
| 1972 | "Sweet America" | – | – | – | – | – | – | – | Can-Base Records | "I Started a Joke" | Non-album singles |
