= Robert D. Scinto =

American businessman

Robert Scinto
- Born: February 16, 1947 (age 79); Bridgeport, Connecticut
- Other name: Bob Scinto
- Education: Sacred Heart University
- Occupations: Commercial real estate developer Chief executive officer and chairman of the board, R. D. Scinto, Inc.
- Years active: 1973 – Present
- Spouse: Barbara Scinto
- Children: Dana Scinto Colangelo (b. 1975); Amy Scinto Corselli (b. 1975); Katherine Scinto (b. 1978); Robert A. Scinto (b. 1981)

Robert Daniel Scinto (born February 16, 1947) is a Connecticut commercial real estate developer, convicted felon, and founder, chief executive officer, and chairman of the board of R. D. Scinto, Inc. based in Shelton.

== Early life and education ==
Scinto was born in Bridgeport, Connecticut, on February 16, 1947, the son of Daniel Scinto and Doxie Andrews Scinto (1918–2013). He graduated from Andrew Warde High School in Fairfield in 1965 and attended Sacred Heart University in Fairfield at night, graduating in 1971 with a Bachelor of Arts degree in business administration.

== Biography ==
While attending Sacred Heart University, Robert Scinto worked by day as a plumber in his father's business, D and R Plumbing, in Bridgeport. His initial rehabilitation project was of a three-family house in Bridgeport, the first of some 20 rehabs he undertook between 1971 and 1975. In 1975, R.D. Scinto, Inc. constructed its first apartment house, a 22-unit structure at 300 French St. in Bridgeport. The second, a 39-unit apartment house in Bridgeport, went up in 1979. In the same year he began projects in Shelton, beginning with construction of the State National Bank building in that community.

== Business endeavors ==
Scinto properties can be found across Connecticut in Trumbull, Fairfield, Wilton and Naugatuck, as well as Shelton.

Supporters of Scinto attended his 2011 hearing when he was accused of making false statements to an FBI agent in 2008 regarding inappropriate gifts to city officials. After pleading guilty, Scinto was sentenced to six months in federal prison plus 2 years of supervised release.

Scinto's recent projects include the state-of-the-art Medical Center of Fairfield County in Trumbull, which opened in March 2013; the R. D. Scinto, Inc. network, which has 3.2 million square feet of office space; and the 65-acre campus on Corporate Drive in Shelton, where companies like Cartier, Prudential Financial, Iriquois Gas, Sikorsky, Blum Shapiro and Ganim Financial are based. At the Shelton campus, there is a copy of Michelangelo's "David" and a sculpture of Da Vinci's "Vitruvian Man" by Babbette Bloch. Scinto's Il Palio Ristorante, named for the medieval horse race held twice annually in Siena, Italy, features a statue of two horses sculpted by Sergio Benvenuti and cast by the Ferdinando Marinelli Artistic Foundry of Florence, Italy.

== Honors and awards ==
Scinto has received the Distinguished Achievement Award from the Connecticut Construction Institute, the Bridgeport Rescue Mission Award for helping the homeless, the Patron of the Year Award from the Fairfield Arts Council, the Kennedy Center Vision Award, and the Toby Award of the Southern Connecticut Building Owners and Management Association, among others.
