= Ron Cohen =

American television composer and soundtrack writer

Ron Cohen is an American television composer and soundtrack writer. He graduated from the California State University, in Northridge.

== Positions held ==
- Composer on Leeza and The Guiding Light.
- Music writer on Go Tigers!
- Sound track on Rat Race

== Awards and nominations ==
Cohen has been nominated for five Daytime Emmy awards and won twice, in the categories Outstanding Music Direction and Composition for a Drama Series, and Outstanding Achievement in Musical Direction and Composition for a Drama series, for his work on The Guiding Light. He was nominated in 1996, 1997, 1998, 1999, 2002 and 2004. He won twice, in 1996< and 1998. His 1996 Daytime Emmy win was shared with Jonathan Firstenberg, Robyn Cutler, Michael Licari, Rick Rhodes, John Henry Kreitler, Wes Boatman, Danny Lawrence, John E. Young, David Grant, Barry De Vorzon, Richard Hazard, Edward Dzubak and Alan Bellink.
