= George Jinda =

Hungarian-American percussionist

George Jinda was a Hungarian-American percussionist who co-founded the smooth jazz group Special EFX with Chieli Minucci in 1982. He died in 2002 from respiratory failure.
