= All the Right Moves (film) =

1983 film by Michael Chapman

- Theatrical release poster
- Directed by: Michael Chapman
- Written by: Michael Kane
- Produced by: Stephen Deutsch
- Starring: Tom Cruise; Craig T. Nelson; Lea Thompson
- Cinematography: Jan de Bont
- Edited by: David Garfield
- Music by: David Richard Campbell
- Production company: Lucille Ball Productions
- Distributed by: 20th Century Fox
- Release date: October 21, 1983
- Running time: 91 minutes
- Country: United States
- Language: English
- Budget: $5.6 million
- Box office: $17.2 million

All the Right Moves is a 1983 American sports drama film directed by Michael Chapman, written by Michael Kane, and starring Tom Cruise, Craig T. Nelson, Lea Thompson, Chris Penn and Gary Graham. It was filmed on location in Johnstown, Pennsylvania, and Pittsburgh.

== Plot ==
Stefan "Stef" Djordjevic is a Serbian American high school defensive back who is gifted in sports and is a "B" student academically. He is seeking a college football scholarship to escape the economically depressed small Western Pennsylvania town of Ampipe, a dead-end job and a life working at the mill, just like his grandfather, father, and his brother Greg. He dreams of becoming an electrical engineer after he graduates from college. Ampipe is a company town whose economy is dominated by the town's main employer, American Pipe & Steel, a steel mill struggling through the downturn of the early 1980s recession. Stef gets through his days with the love of his girlfriend, Lisa Lietzke, and his strong bond with his teammates.

In the big football game against the undefeated Walnut Heights High School, Ampipe appears headed to win the game, when a fumbled handoff in the closing seconds, along with Stefan's pass interference penalty earlier in the game, lead to Walnut Heights' victory. Following the game, Coach Vern Nickerson lambastes the fumbler in the locker room, telling him he "quit" on the team. When Stefan retorts that the coach himself quit, the coach kicks him off the team.

In the aftermath, disgruntled Ampipe fans vandalize Coach Nickerson's house and yard. Stefan is present and is a reluctant participant, but is nonetheless spotted by Nickerson as the vandals flee. From there, Stefan deals with personal battles, including dealing with the coach blackballing him among colleges because of his attitude and participation in the vandalism. Stefan gets in an argument with Lisa, and his best friend Brian declines a scholarship offer to USC and plans to marry his pregnant girlfriend.

After Stefan and Lisa reconcile, Lisa decides to talk to Nickerson's wife to try to help. After witnessing another football player, Vinnie Salvucci, get arrested during class for armed robbery, Nickerson begins to question how his actions might affect Stefan's future.

After a confrontation in the street where Stefan calls Nickerson a hypocrite for always touting the "together, together" mentality of the team and then abandoning him, Nickerson realizes how he was wrong for blackballing Stefan. He has accepted a coaching position on the West Coast at Cal Poly San Luis Obispo and offers Stefan a full scholarship to play football there, the best engineering school in California, which he accepts.

== Cast ==
- Tom Cruise as Stefan Djordjevic
- Craig T. Nelson as Coach Vern Nickerson
- Lea Thompson as Lisa Lietzke
- Charles Cioffi as Pop
- Gary Graham as Greg Djordjevic
- Paul Carafotes as Vinnie Salvucci
- Chris Penn as Brian Riley
- Leon as Austin "Shadow" Williams
- Sandy Faison as Suzie Nickerson
- James A. Baffico as Bosko
- Mel Winkler as Jess Covington
- Terry O'Quinn as Freeman Smith

== Production ==
The film was produced by Stephen Deutsch, with Phillip Goldfarb as co-producer. Gary Morton of Lucille Ball Productions was executive producer. The production was filmed over seven weeks in Johnstown, Pennsylvania, in the early spring of 1983. The recently closed sixty-year-old high school (40.3217°N 78.9217°W), the former campus of Greater Johnstown High School, was used as the location of the film, along with Point Stadium. Actress Thompson was inserted as a new student at Ferndale Area High School for three days prior to shooting. Cruise was similarly inserted into Greater Johnstown High School, but was recognized immediately. (His only notable film part at the time was in Taps in 1981; The Outsiders and Risky Business were yet to be released.)

In 2018, Thompson stated she initially did not want the part, as the script required her to participate in two nude scenes, but Cruise persuaded the producers to drop one of the scenes and was naked with her in the remaining scene.

== Reception ==
The film was released to favorable reviews. It has a score of 61% on the review aggregator website Rotten Tomatoes based on 24 reviews. The website's consensus reads, "All the Right Moves is an uncommonly grim coming-of-age drama that overcomes numerous clichés with its realistic approach to its characters and setting." On Metacritic, it has a score of 62 out of 100 based on seven reviews, indicating "generally favorable" reviews.

Janet Maslin of The New York Times called it "a well-made but sugar-coated working-class fable about a football star." Roger Ebert of the Chicago Sun-Times gave it 3 out of 4 and wrote: "Two people finally tell each other the truth. This is, of course, an astonishing breakthrough in movies about teenagers, and All the Right Moves deserves it." Locally, Ed Blank of the Pittsburgh Press saw it as flawed, but captured the look of Johnstown, and Marylynn Urucchio of the Pittsburgh Post-Gazette rated it as elementary but uplifting.

Among the unfavorable reviews, TV Guide called the movie "cliché-riddled" and criticized director Michael Chapman for not taking any risks. Richard Corliss of Time called it a "naive little movie (that) hopes to prove itself the Flashdance of football."

== See also ==
- List of American football films
- Working class culture
