= Joseph Solomito =

American television director

Joseph "Joe" Solomito is an American television director and Executive Producer.

== Positions held ==
- First-assistant Director on The Toxic Avenger (1985)
- Production executive on The Toxic Avenger
- Technical Director on Ryan's Hope and All My Children
- Executive Producer on ABC News' Nightline

== Awards and nominations ==
Solomito has been nominated for five Daytime Emmy awards in the category Outstanding Achievement in Technical Excellence for a Daytime Drama Series, for his work on All My Children. He was nominated in 1980, 1981, and 1982, and won all three awards. His first win was shared with Howard Zweig, Lawrence Hammond, Robert Ambrico, Diane Cates-Cantrell, Christopher Mauro Larry Strack, Vincent Senatore, Albin S. Lemanski, Len Walas, Diana Wenman, Jean Dadario-Burke Roger Haenelt, John Grella, Irving Robbin, James Reichert, and Teri Smith.

Other programming produced by Solomito includes Good Morning America, Watergate Hearings, political conventions and Wide World of Sports, including, Monday Night Football, US Open and Olympic coverage.
