= Arwin Records =

American record label

- Founder: Martin Melcher
- Status: defunct
- Country of origin: United States
- Location: Beverly Hills, California

Arwin Records was an American label that operated from the late-1950s to mid-1960s. Artists to have releases on the label include Dave Barbour and his Orchestra Hadda Brooks, Mel Carter, The Cascades, Doris Day, Jan & Arnie, David Lucas and Billy Watkins.

== Background ==
The label was headquartered in Beverley Hills. The label along with Daywin Music and Artist Music were a division of Arwin Productions, owned by Doris Day and Marty Melcher. In October 1959, it was reported by The Billboard that the head of the label, Marty Melcher was getting ready to expand the label into a full line. That included the regular releases of record singles and a packaged goods line. Bob Chrystal formerly of Korwin Music joined Melcher's music operation in 1960 to be in charge of Eastern operations for the label as well as other divisions under the Melcher umbrella.
