= Diana Wenman =

American television director and editor

Diana Wenman is an American television director, and editor.

== Positions held ==
- Director on All My Children (1981), and Search for Tomorrow.
- Associate Director on Royal Society Jazz Orchestra (1986)
- Editor on The Electric Company
- Producer's Assistant on Mack and Myer for Hire
- Television Stage Manager on Manon Lescaut

== Awards and nominations ==
Wenman has been nominated for three Daytime Emmy awards in the category Outstanding Achievement in Technical Excellence for a Daytime Drama Series, for her work on All My Children. She was nominated in 1980, 1981, and 1982, and won all three awards. Her first win was shared with Joseph Solomito, Howard Zweig, Lawrence Hammond, Robert Ambrico, Diane Cates-Cantrell, Christopher Mauro, Larry Strack, Vincent Senatore, Albin S. Lemanski, Len Walas, Jean Dadario-Burke, Roger Haenelt, John Grella, Irving Robbin, James Reichert, and Teri Smith.
