= Martin Melcher =

American film producer (1915–1968)

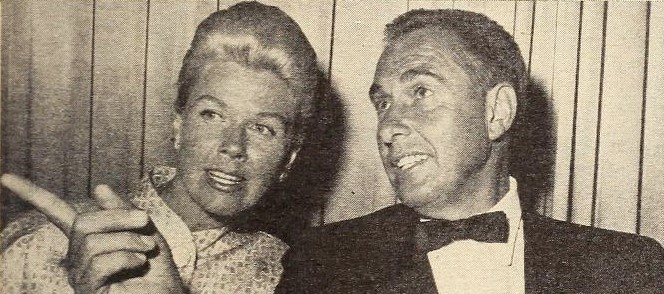
- Melcher and Doris Day, 1960
- Born: August 1, 1915; North Adams, Massachusetts, U.S.
- Died: April 20, 1968 (aged 52); Los Angeles, California, U.S.
- Occupation: Film producer
- Spouses: Jane Rappaport (divorced) Patty Andrews (m. 1947; div. 1950) Doris Day (m. 1951)

Martin Melcher (August 1, 1915 – April 20, 1968) was an American motion picture and music executive. He was married to popular singer and actress Doris Day, whose fortune he squandered, leaving her in massive debt after his death. Melcher and Day also owned a series of business ventures named Arwin. Melcher produced several films in the 1950s and 1960s through the independent film production company Arwin Productions, released music through the record label Arwin Records, and published music through the music publishing companies Arwin Music and Daywin Music, Mart Music and Artists Music. He also was the president of Kirk Douglas' music publishing company, Peter Vincent Music.

== Early life ==
Melcher was born in North Adams, Massachusetts, to Jewish parents Minnie (née Gabriner) and Alter Melcher. He began his career as a song plugger while married to his first wife, singer Jane Rappaport, in New York. He then worked as an agent and road manager for the Andrews Sisters and married Patty Andrews on October 19, 1947. The couple divorced on March 30, 1950.

== Career ==
Melcher married Doris Day in 1951, and they formed their own production company, Arwin Productions, in 1952. He adopted Day’s son from a previous marriage, Terry, who was known later as a music producer. All but one of Melcher's film projects were starring vehicles for Day. In 1959, Melcher and Day formed Arwin Productions subsidiaries Arwin Records, a record label, Arwin Music, Daywin Music, Mart Music and Artists Music, music publishing companies.

In September 1957, Arwin Productions moved into a luxurious new building at 250 North Canon Drive in Beverly Hills, California. The three-story building was designed by architect Herman Charles Light and was shared with actor Kirk Douglas's film production company, Bryna Productions, public relations agency Rogers & Cowan (which would later represent Melcher and Arwin Productions), and law firm Rosenthal & Norton. In early 1958, Melcher was named President of Kirk Douglas's newly formed music-publishing company, Peter Vincent Music Corporation, which was named after Douglas's third son, Peter Douglas. The purpose of Peter Vincent Music was to publish and copyright the music (theme songs, soundtracks, scores and cues) from Bryna Productions' films and administer royalties to the songwriters and composers. Peter Vincent Music's first published and copyrighted music was the soundtrack of The Vikings, composed by Mario Nascimbene. Peter Vincent Music was affiliated with performance rights organizations BMI in the United States and BUMA in Europe.

In 1962, Melcher made his only foray into Broadway theatre with The Perfect Setup, a play starring Gene Barry, Angie Dickinson and Jan Sterling. It closed after five performances.

== Death ==
Melcher died on April 20, 1968, at the age of 52. According to Day's 1975 autobiography, Melcher's physician informed her that Melcher suffered from an enlarged heart. Melcher practiced Christian Science and elected not to seek medical intervention until his condition deteriorated.

== Debts ==
Shortly after Melcher's death, Day discovered that he had committed her to a CBS situation comedy, The Doris Day Show, without consulting with her. He had also embezzled millions of dollars that she had earned throughout their marriage because of poor investments and had left her deeply in debt. Day sued Melcher's business partner Jerome B. Rosenthal and was awarded nearly $23 million for fraud and malpractice following a 99-day trial. Rosenthal declared bankruptcy; and, in August 1977, Day settled with his insurers for $6 million, which was paid in 23 annual installments.

== Selected credits ==
- Julie (1956)
- The Tunnel of Love (1958)
- Pillow Talk (1959)
- It Happened to Jane (1959)
- Midnight Lace (1960)
- Please Don't Eat the Daisies (1960)
- Lover Come Back (1961)
- Billy Rose's Jumbo (1962)
- That Touch of Mink (1962)
- Move Over, Darling (1963)
- The Thrill of It All (1963)
- Send Me No Flowers (1964)
- Do Not Disturb (1965)
- Caprice (1967)
- With Six You Get Eggroll (1968)
- Where Were You When the Lights Went Out? (1968)
