= Kim Pensyl =

American keyboardist

Kim Pensyl is an American pop-jazz and new-age music keyboardist. He attended Ohio State University, and California State University, Northridge for graduate school and had several CDs produced by Shanachie Records. He has worked in bands with Al Hirt, Don Ellis, Hubert Laws, Gerald Wilson, and Guy Lombardo. He is part of the Jazz Studies Department faculty at the College-Conservatory of Music (part of the University of Cincinnati).

== Career ==
Kim Pensyl is a musician, composer, and arranger who has twice been named one of Billboard’s Top-20 Contemporary Jazz Artists of the Year. A pianist and trumpeter, he has had four Top-10 albums on Billboard’s Contemporary Jazz chart. He has recorded with jazz artists such as Toots Thielemans, and modern musicians like Joey Calderazzo, Bob Mintzer, Chiele Minucci, Andy Narell, Will Kennedy, Steve Rodby, and Alex Acuna. He has performed at jazz venues such as The Blue Note, Blues Alley, Caravan of Dreams, Scullers, Beacon Theatre, and Great American Music Hall. He has also appeared at the Clearwater Jazz Festival, Sunfest, Summerfest, Stone Mountain Jazz Festival, and Pacific Jazz Festival among others. Also, Kim has toured with the Woody Herman Orchestra and Acoustic Alchemy. He has more than 100 published works recorded and over 150 compositions and arrangements in his catalog. Kim is currently teaching jazz studies at the College-Conservatory of Music at the University of Cincinnati. He is the featured artist in the WJZA Smooth Jazz Trio around Central Ohio and also performs at various clubs and concerts. In addition, he performs with the faculty and guest artists at CCM, such as Arturo Sandoval, Terri Lyne Carrington, and Mulgrew Miller among others, along with several big bands in the Cincinnati area.

== Discography ==
- 1988 Pensyl Sketches #1
- 1989 Pensyl Sketches #2
- 1989 A Kim Pensyl Christmas
- 1990 Pensyl Sketches #3
- 1992 3 Day Weekend
- 1993 Eyes of Wonder
- 1994 When You Were Mine
- 1996 Under the Influence
- 1997 Quiet Cafe
- 1999 Places I've Been
- 2002 At the Moment
- 2004 Solo Sketches October
- 2008 When Katie Smiles
- 2010 On the Horizon
- 2012 Foursight
- 2015 Foreign Love Affair
- 2015 Early Snowfall
