= Birch Johnson =

American trombonist (b. 1953)

Birch "Crimson Slide" Johnson (born 1953 in Dublin, Georgia) is an American trombonist. He is a first call studio trombonist, Emmy-nominated composer, producer and songwriter based in New York City. He graduated from the University of Alabama, receiving a Bachelor of Music degree. At Alabama, he studied with noted jazz educator, Steve Sample, Sr. He subsequently attended Eastman School of Music, receiving the Master of Music degree, majoring in jazz performance.

For 10 years, Johnson was a member of the Blues Brothers Band and appeared, as an actor, in the movie Blues Brothers 2000.
