= James A. Baffico =

American television soap opera director

- Born: James Angelo Baffico; January 1, 1942 (age 84); United States
- Education: University of Nebraska; University of Michigan
- Occupations: Actor; director; producer; screenwriter

James Angelo Baffico (born January 1, 1942) is an American television soap opera director, producer and occasional script writer. Born in San Francisco, California, has a Ph.D. from the University of Michigan, an M.A. and B.A. from the University of Nebraska. He is known for his role as "Bosko" in the 1983 Tom Cruise vehicle film All the Right Moves and as "Wooley" in George A. Romero's Dawn of the Dead. Baffico has produced films and written screenplays for Universal Studios, Vista, and Paramount Pictures. He has been variously credited as Jim Baffico, James Baffico, and James A. Baffico.

== Filmography ==
Year	Title	Role	Notes
2010	Arthur 3: The War of the Two Worlds	Martin Baltimore	
2003	Law & Order: Criminal Intent (TV series)	Derwit Cooper	
2000	It Had to Be You	Police Desk Sergeant	
1993-1996	Law & Order (TV series)	Detective Scapelli, Fred Field, Henninger	
1990	One Life to Live	Tough Guy	
1989	Dream Street (TV series)	Frank	
1988	Me and Him	Stu Gazzo	
1986 - 1988	Spenser: For Hire (TV series)	Murray Peltzer / Nash Bodine	
1985	Silver Bullet	Milt Sturmfuller	
1983	All the Right Moves	Bosko	
1981	Knightriders	Lester Dean	
1980	Death Penalty (TV movie)	Captain Leibowitz	
1978	Dawn of the Dead	Wooley	

== Positions held ==
All My Children

- Occasional Director (2004, 2005)
- Director (1993-1998; 2000-2004)

The Doctors

- executive producer (1981-1982)

Another World

- Producer/Director (1981-1985)

As the World Turns

- Director (1998-1999)

Days of Our Lives

- Director (1989; 2006- August 16, 2007)
- Occasional Director (2004, 2005, 2006)
- Occasional Script Writer (2003)

== Awards and nominations ==
Daytime Emmy Award: 8

- Win: 1995 & 2003, Directing, All My Children
- Nomination: 1995-1999, 2001-2003, Directing, All My Children
