= Casey Childs =

American television director, producer and writer

Casey Childs is an American theater director and the founder of Primary Stages, a non-profit off-Broadway theater company in New York City.

In 2008, Primary Stages received a Lucille Lortel Award for its Outstanding Body of Work. Carnegie Mellon University awarded Childs their Commitment to Playwrights Award in 1995. From 1982 until 1985, Childs was the Artistic Programs Director for New Dramatists, America's oldest playwrights' organization, where he conducted workshops for playwrights in developing new works.

Childs spent four seasons directing staged readings of new plays for the Eugene O'Neill Theater Conference. Two of the media scripts he directed there, Jacob Aaron Estes' Mean Creek and Eric John Litra's The Nickel Children, were later produced as feature films.

Regionally, Childs has directed Sexual Perversity in Chicago at the Edinburgh International Festival in Scotland, The Magnificent Cuckold for the Metro Theater Company and the Pittsburgh Museum of Art, and Gym Rats, a staged reading co-produced by New Dramatists and the McDonald's corporation.

For television, he produced A. R. Gurney's Far East, directed by Daniel Sullivan for the Stage on Screen series for WNET/PBS. He has produced and/or directed network television over thirty years and has worked on shows including The Young and the Restless and As the World Turns for CBS, Hollywood Heights for Sony Pictures, Another World for NBC and Loving, The City, One Life to Live, All My Children and segments of Spin City for ABC. He was the senior producer for All My Children for several years. He has also worked on shows for Turner Broadcasting and Lifetime. He won two Emmy Awards for his television directing.

Childs has been on theater panels for the Pennsylvania State Arts Council and the Affiliated Artists. He was a panelist and site evaluator for the Pew Charitable Trusts Philadelphia Theater Initiative. He was a governor for two years for the National Academy of Television Arts and Sciences New York Chapter, where he headed the Critical Viewing Committee. He has served on the East Coast Directors' Council of the Directors Guild of America and was a Vice President of the DGA's National Board for four years. He was the Vice President of the original board for LMDA, the Literary Managers and Dramaturges of America. He is a member of Actors' Equity, Stage Directors and Choreographers Society, and the Directors Guild of America.

In 2020, the Actors Fund documented his life's work as part of their Performing Arts Legacy Project.

== Television awards and nominations ==
=== Daytime Emmy Awards ===
- Nominated, 2005, Drama Series, All My Children
- Nominated, 2005, Directing, All My Children
- Won, 2003, Directing, All My Children
- Nominated, 2002, Directing, All My Children
- Nominated, 2001, Directing, All My Children
- Nominated, 2000, Directing, All My Children
- Nominated, 1999, Directing, All My Children
- Nominated, 1998, Directing, All My Children
- Nominated, 1993, Directing, Another World
- Won, 1992, Directing, Another World

=== Directors Guild of America Awards ===
- Nomination, 2006, Directing, All My Children Ep. #9297
- Nomination, 2000, Directing, All My Children Ep. #7919
