= Frederic Hand =

American jazz musician

- Born: 1947 (age 78–79); Brooklyn, New York
- Occupations: classical guitarist and composer

Frederic Hand (born 1947) is a classical guitarist and composer.

== Career ==
A native of Brooklyn, New York, Hand was attracted to the music of Bill Evans, John Coltrane, and Miles Davis in his teens. Most of his career has been spent in classical music. He graduated from the Mannes School of Music, then studied in England with classical guitarist Julian Bream.

In 1984, Hand became guitarist and lutenist for the Metropolitan Opera, where he accompanied Plácido Domingo and Luciano Pavarotti. He received a Grammy Award nomination for his composition, "Prayer". He was given the Samuel Sanders Award by the Classical Recording Foundation for his work with flautist Paula Robison. As a composer, his scores have been featured in the films This Boy's Life, Kramer vs. Kramer, and The Next Man, as well as television programs Sesame Street, As the World Turns, and Guiding Light, for which he won an Emmy Award in 1996.

Hand has been chairman of the classical guitar departments at Bennington College and the State University of New York at Purchase and has taught at Mannes College. He has performed at the Mostly Mozart Festival, Marlboro Music Festival, and the Caramoor Festival, and with the New York Philharmonic and Vienna Philharmonic.

== Discography ==
- Baroque and on the Street (CBS, 1981)
- Trilogy The Guitar Music of Frederic Hand (Musicmasters, 1983)
- Trilogy The Guitar Music of Frederic Hand (Musical Heritage Society, 1984)
- Jazzantiqua (RCA, 1989)
- Solos (Willow)
- Heart's Song (MusicMasters, 1992)
- Odyssey (Panoramic, 2016)
- Across Time (New Focus Recordings, 2022)

With others

- Kramer vs. Kramer (Sony)
- Vivaldi Concerti & Other Works, with Eliot Fisk (MusicMasters)
- Some Towns and Cities, with Benjamin Verdery (Newport Classic)
- Diversions, with Calliope (Summit)
- The Last Romantic, with Artie Traum (Narada)
- Castles, Kirks, and Caves, with Abby Newton
- Places of the Spirit, with Paula Robison (Pucker Art)
