= Robert Scinto =

American television soap opera director

Robert Scinto (September 3, 1946) is an American television soap opera director.

== Directing credits ==
All My Children

- Director (1997-2002)
- Occasional Director (2002-2004)

The City

- Director (entire run, 1995–1997)

Guiding Light

- Director (2005-2009)
- Occasional Director (2004-2005)

Love of Life

- Director (late 1970s)

Loving

- Director (entire run, 1983–1995)

One Life to Live

- Occasional Director (2002-2004)

== Awards and nominations ==
Daytime Emmy Award

- Win, 2007, Directing, Guiding Light
- Nomination, 2004, Directing, One Life to Live
- Win, 2003, Directing, All My Children
- Nomination, 1998–2002, Directing, All My Children
- Nomination, 1989, Directing, Loving
- Nomination, 1980, Directing, Love of Life
