= Robert Israel (composer) =

American pianist

- Born: April 30, 1963 (age 62); Los Angeles, California, U.S.
- Occupation: Composer

Robert Israel (born April 30, 1963 in Los Angeles) is an acclaimed film score composer who works primarily on silent films. Israel was a winner of Turner Classic Movies' first annual Young Film Composer's Competition in 2000, for his score on the silent film, Tell It to the Marines (1926). He is an organist and pianist, and Israel has been described as following in the footsteps of other great film scorers, Arthur Kleiner and Gaylord Carter. He has also been described along with Dennis James as "one of the most respected and sought after accompanists in the business." In 2001, he was featured as the live piano accompaniment to 10 short silent films shown at the Niles Broncho Billy Film Festival in Fremont, California.
