= Brian Siewert =

American composer and musician

- Occupations: American Composer/Songwriter (Film/TV & Concert Stage), Speaker & Visual Artist

Brian D. Siewert, alternatively credited with or without his middle initial, is an American public speaker, multiple Emmy Award-winning concert and television composer, producer, songwriter, musician, arranger and visual artist. He has worked on The Guiding Light (1996–2009) as Principal Composer/Songwriter, As the World Turns (1995-2010) as Principal Composer/Songwriter and Supervising Music Producer, General Hospital - ABC (TV Series), The Oprah Winfrey Show, The Ellen DeGeneres Show (2003), Another World (1995-1999),The Tyra Banks Show Syndicated, The Dr. Oz Show Syndicated, Sunset Beach (1997-1998), Extra, Access Hollywood, Street Smarts, elimiDATE, Celebrity Justice, The Sharon Osbourne Show, and The Real Gilligan's Island. Siewert is the recipient of both ASCAP and BMI (Broadcast Music, Inc.) awards for his work in Film/TV Music.

He toured with country music singer Wynonna Judd as her keyboardist for several hundred arena and amphitheater shows during the "Tell Me Wy" and "Black & Wy" tours (1992-1994). As a keyboardist, producer, arranger, conductor and studio musician, Siewert has contributed to albums by Rascal Flatts, Band, Trace Adkins, Ronnie Milsap, Barbara Mandrell, Steve Green (singer), Martin Taylor (guitarist), Jim Brickman, John Rich, Rebecca Lynn Howard and Wade Hayes. In 2012, he was nominated for a Dove Award for producing the album Christmas Hope for recording artist Ben Utecht.

In 2007, Siewert established the "Brian D. Siewert Artist In Motion" Scholarship at his alma mater Lakeshore High School in Stevensville, MI where he was the 2008 recipient of their Distinguished Alumni Award. The annual scholarship grants a college scholarship to a graduating senior in the field of any/all arts. Allendale (MI) Public Schools (Allendale High School) commissioned Siewert in 2011 to compose what is now the school's official alma mater "Oh Allendale."

== Awards and nominations ==
Daytime Emmy Awards:

- WON, 1998, Outstanding Achievement in Musical Direction and Composition for a Drama Series for: "The Guiding Light"
- Nominated, 1999, Outstanding Music Direction and Composition for a Drama Series for: "The Guiding Light"
- Nominated, 2000, Outstanding Achievement in Music Direction and Composition for a Drama Series for: "Another World"
- Nominated, 2001, Outstanding Achievement in Music Direction and Composition for a Drama Series for: "The Guiding Light"
- WON, 2001, Outstanding Original Song for "The Guiding Light" song "Where There is Hope" (shared with Trey Bruce and John Bettis)
- Nominated, 2002, Outstanding Original Song for: "The Guiding Light" song "On My Own" (shared with Leslie Mills)
- Nominated, 2002, Outstanding Original Song for "The Guiding Light" song "I Believe in the Mystery" (shared with Billy Kirsch) performed by Laura Bell Bundy
- Nominated, 2002, Outstanding Achievement in Music Direction and Composition for a Drama Series for: "The Guiding Light"
- Nominated, 2003, Outstanding Achievement in Music Direction and Composition for a Drama Series for: "The Guiding Light"
- Nominated, 2003, Outstanding Achievement in Music Direction and Composition for a Drama Series for: "The Guiding Light"
- Nominated, 2005, Outstanding Achievement in Music Direction and Composition for a Drama Series for: "The Guiding Light"
- Nominated, 2007, Outstanding Original Song for: "The Guiding Light" song "Can You Love Me (With the Lights on)" (shared with Angela Lauer and Timothy Lauer)
- Nominated, 2007, Outstanding Original Song for: "The Guiding Light" song "In a Moment". Siewert performed the vocal as well.
- WON, 2007, Outstanding Achievement in Music Direction and Composition for a Drama Series for: "The Guiding Light" "SHE'S A MARVEL" episode. Siewert scored and mixed the entire episode in conjunction with MARVEL STUDIOS who developed story and storyboards which were used exclusively in the episode.
- WON, 2008, Outstanding Achievement in Music Direction and Composition for a Drama Series for: "The Guiding Light" Entire episode COMPOSED, ARRANGED and MIXED by Siewert on common theme executed throughout the score.

ASCAP FILM & TELEVISION AWARDS:

- WON, 2008, Film and Television Award for Most Performed Theme and Underscore for a series

BMI FILM & TELEVISION AWARDS:

- WON, 2001, and 2002 Film and Television Awards

== Sources ==
- Brian Siewert at IMDb
- Brian D. Siewert at Artist Direct.com
- http://www.briandavidsiewert.com
