= Barry De Vorzon =

American composer, singer, songwriter, and producer (b. 1934)

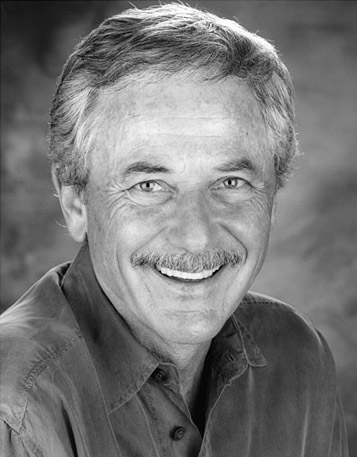

Background information
- Born: July 31, 1934 (age 91); New York City, U.S.
- Genres: Pop; rock; doo-wop; film score
- Occupations: Composer; singer; songwriter; producer
- Formerly of: Barry & the Tamerlanes

Barry De Vorzon (born July 31, 1934) is an American composer, singer, songwriter, and record producer. He worked as a pop musician during the 1960s and co-founded Valiant Records, before being known as a composer of film and television scores during the following decades. He is a Grammy Award winner, an Academy Award nominee, and a six-time Daytime Emmy Award winner.

== Biography ==
De Vorzon was born to a musical family in New York City. His father was singer and violinist Jules De Vorzon. His family moved to Palm Springs, California when he was a teenager.

=== Songwriting ===
De Vorzon's earliest hit compositions were "Just Married" (1958), written with Al Allen and recorded by Marty Robbins, which reached number 26 on Billboard magazine's Hot 100 chart and number one on the Country chart; and "Dreamin'" (1960), written with Ted Ellis, recorded by Johnny Burnette, and charting at number 11 on the Hot 100. Dorsey Burnette (whom he was managing) and De Vorzon co-wrote several of Dorsey's hits ("Hey, Little One"; "Big Rock Candy Mountain"; "Red Roses"; "Noah's Ark").

De Vorzon co-founded Valiant Records with publishing associate Billy Sherman in 1960. During the 1960s, he signed the Association to Valiant, and produced its first single, a cover of the Bob Dylan tune "One Too Many Mornings".

De Vorzon wrote "I Wonder What She's Doing Tonight" for the Cascades, but the group did not record it. In 1963, De Vorzon made his own recording of the song with his group Barry & the Tamerlanes. Also in 1963 he co-wrote the ballad "Shy Girl", which was recorded by The Cascades.

De Vorzon wrote the tune "Girls" for Johnny Burnette. It reached No. 37 in the UK 1961 charts.

=== Film and television scores ===
He composed the soundtracks to many 1970s and 1980s films, and one of the tunes, "Cotton's Dream" (from Bless the Beasts and Children) was retitled "Nadia's Theme" and re-released by A&M Records for the television soap opera The Young and the Restless. "Nadia's Theme" hit No. 8 on the US Top 40 in 1976 and the album from which it was taken peaked at No. 42 on the Billboard 200; in 1977, it won a Grammy Award for Best Instrumental Arrangement. The main title song, "Bless the Beasts and Children," was recorded by the Carpenters and received an Academy Award nomination.

De Vorzon composed the tune "It's Christmas Once Again in Santa Barbara," which was re-recorded with various other city names, such as San Francisco and San Diego. He also wrote the "Theme from S.W.A.T." and co-wrote the Eagles' hit "In the City" with Joe Walsh. In 1979 he wrote the music for the movie The Warriors.

De Vorzon was one of the developers of the MasterWriter creative software for songwriters and lyricists.

== Soundtracks ==
- R. P. M. (1970) (with Perry Botkin Jr.)
- Bless the Beasts and Children (1971)
- Dillinger (1973)
- Cooley High (1975)
- Hard Times (1975)
- SWAT (1975)
- Bobbie Jo and the Outlaw (1976)
- Rolling Thunder (1977)
- The Ninth Configuration (1978)
- The Warriors (1979)
- Private Benjamin (1980)
- The Comeback Kid (1980)
- Xanadu (1980)
- Simon & Simon (1981)
- Tattoo (1981)
- Looker (1981)
- Jekyll and Hyde... Together Again (1982)
- Mr. Mom (1983)
- V: The Final Battle (1984)
- Mischief (1985)
- Stick (1985)
- The Belarus File (1985)
- Night of the Creeps (1986)
- The Exorcist III (1990)

== Awards and nominations ==
- Won the 1978 Grammy for Best Instrumental Arrangement, for "Nadia's Theme (The Young and the Restless)".
- Nominated for a 1972 Academy Award for "Bless the Beasts and Children".
- Won six Emmys.
- Received several other nominations.
