= Dominic Messinger =

American television composer

- Genres: Television score
- Occupation: Composer

Dominic Messinger is an American television composer. He did his undergraduate work at Bennington College and went to USC (University of Southern California) graduate school.

He began his work in soap opera music on General Hospital, followed by Santa Barbara and has since composed for reality series and documentaries including Intervention, Brace for Impact, and for Nickelodeon's teen drama Hollywood Heights. He has won 14 Daytime Emmy Awards. According to Adweek magazine, he was represented by John Zacharias Grace's Mean Red Music (MRM) Placement in 2004.

== Composition and sound directing credits ==
- I'll Never Love Anyone Anymore ("Mou Daremo Aisanai") (1991)
- Family Ties (1982)
- Day by Day (1988)
- American Families (1991)
- Santa Barbara (1984–1993)
- Another World (1996–1999)
- Beltran, Los (1999)
- Extraordinary World of Animals (1999)
- One Life to Live (1999–2007)
- Sunset Beach (1999)
- Viva Vegas! (2000)
- Spyder Games (2001)
- Red Water (2003)
- The Quest for Nutrition (2004)
- Intervention (2006–2007)

Credits:
