= Mariah Carey's Christmas Time =

2024 concert tour by Mariah Carey

- Residency and tour concert by Mariah Carey
- Promotional poster for the 2024 shows
- Location: North America • South America • United Kingdom • Europe
- Associated album: Merry Christmas; Merry Christmas II You; Here For It All
- Start date: November 6, 2024
- End date: December 8, 2026
- Legs: 3
- No. of shows: 34

Mariah Carey concert chronology
- The Celebration of Mimi (2024–2025); Mariah Carey's Christmas Time (2024–2026); Firefly Tour (2027)
Mariah Carey's Christmas tour chronology
Merry Christmas to All! / Merry Christmas One and All! (2022–2023)	Mariah Carey's Christmas Time (2024–2026)
Mariah Carey concert residency chronology
The Celebration of Mimi (2024–2025)	Mariah Carey's Christmas Time (2024–2026)

Mariah Carey's Christmas Time is an annual concert series by American singer-songwriter Mariah Carey. Originally launched as her fourteenth concert tour in 2024, the series began on November 6, 2024, in Highland, California at the Yaamava' Resort & Casino, and concluded on December 17, 2024, in New York City at the Barclays Center, with three scheduled dates cancelled due to illness. In 2025, the series continued as a concert residency at Dolby Live in Paradise, Nevada. In 2026, the tour was extended internationally into Brazil, England, Malta, and Abu Dhabi.

== Background ==
In August 2024, Mariah Carey announced Mariah Carey's Christmas Time, deemed as her largest holiday tour to date, via her social media channels. The tour coincided with the 30-year anniversary of her first Christmas album and fourth studio album Merry Christmas (1994) and her song "All I Want for Christmas Is You", one of the best-selling digital singles of all time.

On September 15, 2025, Carey announced that her holiday show would return as a concert residency at Dolby Live in Paradise, Nevada. The residency lasted for ten performances from November 28 through December 13, 2025.

On May 26, 2026, Carey announced the first international shows of Mariah Carey's Christmas Time, playing two dates in Brazil in November. This marks the third year in a row Carey is set to perform in the country, as well the first time Carey is going to perform a holiday show outside North America since the European leg of All I Want for Christmas Is You: A Night of Joy and Festivity in 2018.

== Critical reception ==
Critics felt the concert's Christmas theme came across effectively. In The Arizona Republic, Ed Masley viewed it as "sweet and old-fashioned and corny as hell in a way that was utterly entertaining, hitting all the notes you'd want this sort of Christmas show to hit". Houston Chronicle critic Joey Guerra called the concert "a joy — equal parts Nutcracker fantasia, holiday pageant and TV variety show". Referring to the presence of "reindeer, sleighbells, carolers, and even Santa Claus", DeVaughan Douglas described it as "a full Christmas production" in the Houston Press. For The Desert Sun's Brian Blueskye, the show "brought out the traditional feels celebrating all the usual themes of family, giving and Christmastime love". MusicRow's Sherod Robertson remarked that Carey's inclusion of her children "added a personal touch to the concert, emphasizing the themes of love and togetherness central to the holiday season". Mars Salazar of the Austin American-Statesman and Desiree Gutierrez of the Dallas Observer said Carey evoked Christmas sentiments despite performing in November.

Carey's vocals received praise. Jasmine Osby of the St. Louis Post-Dispatch said she "delivered, showcasing her powerhouse singing and mind-blowing vocal range from beginning to end". Blueskye agreed: her voice was "stunning and powerful from start to finish". The Tennessean's Melonee Hurt thought Carey "showed the crowd she still possesses the five-octave vocal range that made her famous". In The Boston Globe, Victoria Wasylak wrote that Carey's "sparkling five-octave vocal range allowed her to claim the title "Queen of Christmas". Guerra said "she pulled it all out of the bag: whistle notes, belts, falsetto." In USA Today, Melissa Ruggieri felt Carey "still lands those signature dog-whistle notes quite impressively". Salazar thought her "powerhouse vocals were the highlight, with vibrato so effortless that it almost looked like she was lip syncing." Writing for The Philadelphia Inquirer, Shaun Brady said "Carey sounded strong and for the most part seemed to be singing live, with little reliance on recordings and lip-synch". According to Rodney Ho of The Atlanta Journal-Constitution, Carey's "voice remained supple and smooth." Fort Worth Star-Telegram contributor Stefan Stevenson suggested her "vaunted vocals, while still smooth and powerful, seemed muted at times, as if she was struggling with a throat issue of some kind."

Carey's stage presence garnered a mixed reception. Osby thought Carey "worked the stage like a catwalk" in lieu of dancing. Similarly, Salazar said "she let her backup dancers do the heavy lifting throughout the performance, only walking back and forth around the stage." Brady echoed these comments: Carey "comported herself perhaps too regally, pacing the stage slowly while relying on her dancers to supply the energy." According to Guerra, "the band, backup singers and dancers provided a strong framework" for her nonetheless. Gutierrez said "the dancers proved to be pivotal to the show" due to Carey's focus on singing. Hurt felt Carey's lacking of dancing did not detract from the concert as audiences came to hear her sing. Ho thought the tightness of her clothing and wearing of high-heeled shoes contributed to a lack of energy; Wasylak suggested a cold might explain why she occasionally seemed less inspired than the audience. Robertson said Carey established a connection with the audience by "sharing personal anecdotes about the holiday season and expressing her gratitude for their unwavering support over the years". For Ruggieri, Carey's foray into the crowd to sign items showed how she is not necessarily a diva.

== Set list ==
=== 2024 ===
"The Christmas Princess" (book excerpt read by Monroe Cannon, contains elements of "All I Want for Christmas Is You")

Act I

"Sugar Plum Fairy" (Magical Christmas Mix)

1. "Hark! The Herald Angels Sing / Gloria (In Excelsis Deo)"
2. "Joy to the World" (contains elements of the "Celebration Mix")
3. "Silent Night"
4. "O Holy Night"
5. "Christmas Time Is in the Air Again"
6. "Christmas (Baby Please Come Home)"

"Christmas Wrapping" and "Deck the Halls / Let It Snow! Let It Snow! Let It Snow!" (performed by Monroe Cannon and Moroccan Cannon)

Act II

"Santa Claus Is Comin' to Town" intro

7. "Oh Santa!"
8. "Sleigh Ride"
9. "Charlie Brown Christmas"
10. "Miss You Most (At Christmas Time)" (snippet)
11. "When Christmas Comes"
12. "Here Comes Santa Claus (Right Down Santa Claus Lane) / House Top Celebration" (with Moroccan Cannon) (contains elements of "Give It to Me Baby" by Rick James)

"Fall in Love at Christmas" and "God Rest Ye Merry, Gentlemen" (choir interludes)

Act III

"My All" (new version with Christmas-themed lyrics) (choir and background singers interlude)

13. "Emotions"
14. "Hero" (with extended outro)
15. "Fantasy" (Bad Boy Fantasy)
16. "Always Be My Baby"
17. "We Belong Together" (contains elements of "Mimi's Late Night Valentine's Mix," followed by remix outro)

Encore

"Carol of the Bells" (contains elements from "Sing We Now of Christmas") (choir and dancers interlude)
"Santa Claus Is Comin' to Town / Rudolph, the Red-Nosed Reindeer" (crowd singalong)

18. "All I Want for Christmas Is You" (with extended outro)

=== 2025 ===
"The Christmas Princess" (book excerpt, contains elements of "All I Want for Christmas Is You")

Act I

"Sugar Plum Fairy" (Magical Christmas Mix)

1. "Hark! The Herald Angels Sing / Gloria (In Excelsis Deo)"

"Santa Claus Is Comin' to Town" intro

2. "Oh Santa!"
3. "Sleigh Ride"
4. "Charlie Brown Christmas"
5. "Christmas (Baby Please Come Home)"

"Lil Snowman" (dancers interlude)

Act II

6. "Christmas Time Is in the Air Again"
7. "Joy to the World" (contains elements of the "Celebration Mix")
8. "Silent Night" (followed by band introductions)
9. "When Christmas Comes"
10. "Here Comes Santa Claus (Right Down Santa Claus Lane) / House Top Celebration" (contains elements of "Give It to Me Baby" by Rick James)
11. "Fall in Love at Christmas"

"God Rest Ye Merry, Gentlemen" (choir interlude)

Act III

"My All" (new version with Christmas-themed lyrics) (choir and background singers interlude)

12. "Jesus I Do"
13. "Play This Song" (with Daniel Moore II)
14. "In Your Feelings" (with extended outro)
15. "Fantasy" (Bad Boy Fantasy)
16. Medley:
  1. "Honey / Heartbreaker" (mashup)
  2. "Emotions"
  3. "Make It Happen"
  4. "Always Be My Baby"
  5. "Hero"
17. "We Belong Together" (contains elements of "Mimi's Late Night Valentine's Mix")

Encore

"Carol of the Bells" (contains elements from "Sing We Now of Christmas") (choir and dancers interlude)
"Santa Claus Is Comin' to Town / Rudolph, the Red-Nosed Reindeer" (crowd singalong)
"The Christmas Princess" (book excerpt)

18. "All I Want for Christmas Is You" (with extended outro)

=== 2026 ===
"The Christmas Princess" (book excerpt, contains elements of "All I Want for Christmas Is You")

Act I

"Sugar Plum Fairy" (Magical Christmas Mix)

1. "Hark! The Herald Angels Sing / Gloria (In Excelsis Deo)"

"Santa Claus Is Comin' to Town" intro

2. "Oh Santa!"
3. "Sleigh Ride"
4. "Charlie Brown Christmas"
5. "Christmas (Baby Please Come Home)"

"Lil Snowman" (dancers interlude)

Act II

6. "Christmas Time Is in the Air Again"
7. "Joy to the World" (contains elements of the "Celebration Mix")
8. "Silent Night" (followed by band introductions)
9. "When Christmas Comes"
10. "Here Comes Santa Claus (Right Down Santa Claus Lane) / House Top Celebration" (contains elements of "Give It to Me Baby" by Rick James)
11. "Fall in Love at Christmas"

"God Rest Ye Merry, Gentlemen" (choir interlude)

Act III

"My All" (new version with Christmas-themed lyrics) (choir and background singers interlude)

12. "Fantasy" (Bad Boy Fantasy)
13. "Obsessed"
14. "Always Be My Baby"
15. "Emotions"
16. "I Want to Know What Love Is" (with extended outro)
17. "It's Like That"
18. "Shake It Off (contains elements of Don't by Bryson Tiller)
19. "We Belong Together" (contains elements of "Mimi's Late Night Valentine's Mix")

Encore

"Carol of the Bells" (contains elements from "Sing We Now of Christmas") (choir and dancers interlude)
"Santa Claus Is Comin' to Town / Rudolph, the Red-Nosed Reindeer" (crowd singalong)
"The Christmas Princess" (book excerpt)

20. "All I Want for Christmas Is You" (with extended outro)

== Tour dates ==
=== 2024 ===
List of 2024 concerts
Date (2024)	City	Country	Venue
November 6	Highland	United States	Yaamava' Resort & Casino
November 8	Los Angeles	United States	Hollywood Bowl
November 10	Lincoln	United States	Thunder Valley Casino Resort
November 13	Thousand Palms (Note: Billed as Palm Springs.)	United States	Acrisure Arena
November 15	Phoenix	United States	Footprint Center
November 17	Austin	United States	Moody Center
November 19	Houston	United States	Toyota Center
November 21	Dallas	United States	American Airlines Center
November 23	Atlanta	United States	State Farm Arena
November 25	Nashville	United States	Bridgestone Arena
November 27	Rosemont	United States	Allstate Arena
November 29	St. Louis	United States	Enterprise Center
December 1	Washington D.C.	United States	Capital One Arena
December 3	Philadelphia	United States	Wells Fargo Center
December 5	Boston	United States	TD Garden
December 7	Baltimore	United States	CFG Bank Arena
December 9	Raleigh	United States	Lenovo Center
December 17	Brooklyn	United States	Barclays Center

Cancelled shows

Date (2024)	City	Country	Venue	Reason
December 11	Pittsburgh	United States	PPG Paints Arena	Flu
December 13	Newark	United States	Prudential Center	Flu
December 15	Elmont (Note: Billed as Belmont Park.)	United States	UBS Arena	Flu

=== 2025 ===
List of 2025 concerts
Date (2025)	City	Country	Venue
November 28	Paradise (Note: Billed as Las Vegas.)	United States	Dolby Live
November 29	Paradise	United States	Dolby Live
December 2	Paradise	United States	Dolby Live
December 3	Paradise	United States	Dolby Live
December 5	Paradise	United States	Dolby Live
December 6	Paradise	United States	Dolby Live
December 9	Paradise	United States	Dolby Live
December 10	Paradise	United States	Dolby Live
December 12	Paradise	United States	Dolby Live
December 13	Paradise	United States	Dolby Live

=== 2026 ===
List of 2026 concerts
Date (2026)	City	Country	Venue
November 17	São Paulo	Brazil	Nubank Parque
November 21	Rio de Janeiro	Brazil	Farmasi Arena
November 27	Birmingham	England	Utilita Arena
November 30	London	England	The O_{2} Arena
December 2	Manchester	England	Co-op Live
December 8	Attard	Malta	Malta Fairs & Convention Centre
December 12	Abu Dhabi	United Arab Emirates	Etihad Arena

Cancelled shows

Date (2026)	City	Country	Venue	Reason
November 18	São Paulo	Brazil	Nubank Parque	No reason given
