= Merry Christmas One and All! =

2023 concert tour by Mariah Carey

Merry Christmas to All! Merry Christmas One and All!
- Continental tour by Mariah Carey
- Promotional poster
- Location: North America
- Associated album: Merry Christmas; Merry Christmas II You
- Start date: December 9, 2022
- End date: December 17, 2023
- Legs: 2
- No. of shows: 20 in total 16 in United States; 4 in Canada
- Box office: $29.6 million (15 reported shows)

Mariah Carey concert chronology
- The Butterfly Returns (2018–2020); Merry Christmas to All! / Merry Christmas One and All! (2022–2023); The Celebration of Mimi (2024–2025)
Mariah Carey's Christmas tour chronology
All I Want for Christmas Is You: A Night of Joy and Festivity (2014–2019)	Merry Christmas to All! / Merry Christmas One and All! (2022–2023)	Mariah Carey's Christmas Time (2024–2025)

Merry Christmas One and All! was the thirteenth concert tour by American singer Mariah Carey. Spanning 16 dates in the United States and in Canada, it began on November 15, 2023, in Highland, California, and concluded on December 17, 2023, in New York City. It followed Merry Christmas to All!, a December 2022 concert series that consisted of four arena shows and marked Carey's return to touring following the COVID-19 pandemic.

== Background ==
Beginning in 2014, American singer Mariah Carey performed at an annual holiday concert residency, All I Want for Christmas Is You: A Night of Joy and Festivity, at the Beacon Theatre in New York City. The event later expanded into a tour and ended in 2019, when Carey's song "All I Want for Christmas Is You" reached number one on the US Billboard Hot 100 chart for the first time since its 1994 release.

== Merry Christmas to All! (2022) ==
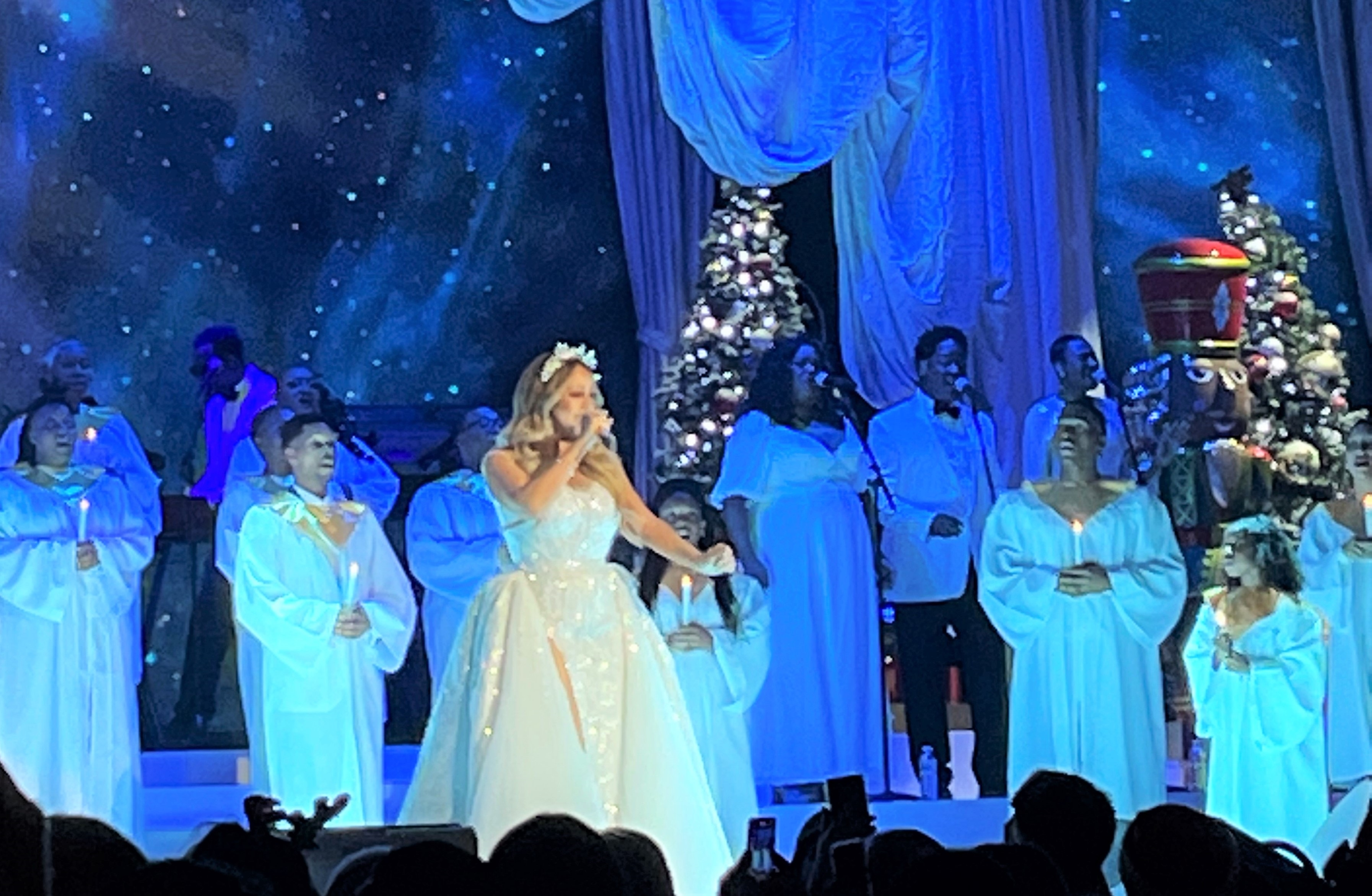
Carey performing at Scotiabank Arena in December 2022

On October 24, 2022, Carey announced that she would resume touring following a brief hiatus during the COVID-19 pandemic and unveiled two shows at the Scotiabank Arena in Toronto, Canada and at Madison Square Garden in New York City. The tickets to Carey's show in New York sold out after one hour, following which the singer announced that she would perform additional shows at each venue in Toronto and New York. To promote the shows, Carey made an appearance on The Tonight Show Starring Jimmy Fallon, where she teased the possibility of her concerts being televised. It was later announced that the singer would host a two-hour primetime special set to air on CBS and Paramount+ based on her shows in New York.

The concert was broadcast as a special titled Mariah Carey: Merry Christmas to All! that aired on the CBS television network (and Paramount+ streaming service) and became the most watched program of its night, drawing in a total of 3.8 million viewers and a 0.4 demo rating.

The show's set list focused predominantly on Carey's catalogue of Christmas music, taken from her albums Merry Christmas and Merry Christmas II You, but also included performances of her other hits. The singer introduced the show with a rendition of The Nutcracker by Tchaikovsky, with Carey using her signature whistle register, followed by a performance of Hark the Herald Angels Sing. The singer also performed the song, "Miss You Most (At Christmas Time)", for the first time in public since the release of her 1994 album, Merry Christmas, as well as a duet of Away in a Manger with her daughter, Monroe Cannon. Carey's shows in New York featured appearances by The Rockettes, Jermaine Dupri and Slick Rick. A gospel choir appeared on several occasions, and dancers were present on stage throughout the show. Carey made a total of four costume changes, which included a snow angel-inspired gown, a red mermaid gown, a white mini-dress, and a red-and-black nutcracker-inspired outfit during an encore performance of All I Want for Christmas Is You.

== Merry Christmas One and All! (2023) ==
On October 2, 2023, Carey announced a new tour, entitled Merry Christmas One and All!, via her social media. She is set to play 16 dates across the United States and Canada, the most expansive seasonal run of her holiday concerts thus far. Ticket presales began on October 5, following one day of early access for American Express card holders. A general public sale commenced on October 6. Ten days later, Carey announced a second show in Los Angeles due to high demand. On October 30, a second concert in New York and a new date in Cleveland were added.

Carey promoted the tour during a November 2 appearance on the American late-night talk show Jimmy Kimmel Live!. On November 6, she participated in interviews on Good Morning America and Entertainment Tonight. Carey also spoke with local media outlets, including KTLA in Los Angeles.

== Critical reception ==
The tour received a positive reception from critics. Leena Tailor of Los Angeles said it "make[s] you feel like you’ve stepped right into a holiday snow globe". Writing for Variety, Steven J. Horowitz called it a "highly polished show". In the Atlanta Black Star, Kiara Washington thought "Carey looked beautiful and sounded angelic as always". Aaron Williams of Uproxx wrote: "If the past few years have given you the mistaken impression that the veteran singer is 'just' a novelty act, her collection of both holiday mainstays and hits will certainly prove you wrong."

== Setlist ==
=== Merry Christmas to All! (2022) ===
"The Nutcracker March" (overture)

Act I

"Sugar Plum Fairy"

1. "Hark! The Herald Angels Sing / Gloria (In Excelsis Deo)"
2. "Joy to the World" (contains elements of the "Celebration Mix")
3. "Sleigh Ride"
4. "Christmas (Baby Please Come Home)" (contains elements of "Jingle Bells")
5. "Silent Night"
6. "Away in a Manger" (with Monroe Cannon) (with extended outro)

"Jesus Oh What a Wonderful Child" (performed by Trey Lorenz)

Act II

7. "Christmas Time Is in the Air Again" (with extended intro)
8. "Miss You Most (At Christmas Time)" (snippet)
9. "When Christmas Comes" (snippet)
10. "O Holy Night" (with extended outro)

"God Rest Ye Merry, Gentlemen" (piano solo)
"Carol of the Bells" (contains elements of "Sing We Now of Christmas) (ballet interlude)

Act III

"Santa Claus Is Comin' to Town" intro

11. "Oh Santa!"
12. "Here Comes Santa Claus (Right Down Santa Claus Lane) / House Top Celebration"
13. Medley:
  1. "Big Energy / Fantasy"
  2. "Honey / Heartbreaker" (mashup)
  3. "My All"
  4. "It's Like That" (contains elements of "Sucker M.C.'s" and "Here We Go" by Run-DMC)
  5. "Emotions"
  6. "Make It Happen"
  7. "Fly Like a Bird"
14. "We Belong Together" (contains elements of "Mimi's Late Night Valentine's Mix")
15. "Hero" (with extended outro)

Encore

"Christmas Wrapping" (performed by Monroe Cannon)

16. "All I Want for Christmas Is You" (with extended outro)

==== Notes ====
- An instrumental interlude of "Christmas Time Is Here" was performed on the first Toronto show, between "Carol of the Bells" and "Oh Santa!" The same interlude was also performed after "Christmas Wrapping" on the second New York show.
- On the first New York show:
  - "Jesus Oh What a Wonderful Child," usually performed by Trey Lorenz, was replaced by "Jesus Had a Mama Like Mine," performed by Billy Porter.
  - An improvised piano snippet of "Jingle Bells" served as the ending to "When Christmas Comes."
  - "Christmas Wrapping" was moved up earlier in the setlist, being performed between "Carol of the Bells" and "Oh Santa!"
  - The Rockettes joined Carey onstage to perform "Oh Santa!." Additionally, an extended outro was performed for the song, where Carey thanked them for joining her in performing the song.
  - Jermaine Dupri, Moroccan Cannon and Slick Rick joined Carey onstage to perform "Here Comes Santa Claus (Right Down Santa Claus Lane) / Housetop Celebration." Additionally, Dupri joined Carey onstage to perform "It's Like That" later on in the show.
    - This was also the case for the second New York show.
  - The band introductions were performed over an impromptu instrumental version of "Fall in Love at Christmas."
    - This was also the case for the second New York show.
  - Drew Barrymore came onstage after "Hero" to introduce "All I Want for Christmas Is You."
  - A ballet interlude to the sound of an instrumental medley of "Christmas (Baby Please Come Home) / Let It Snow! Let It Snow! Let It Snow! / Santa Claus Is Coming to Town / We Wish You a Merry Christmas" was performed by The Rockettes before "All I Want for Christmas Is You."

=== Merry Christmas One and All! (2023) ===
The following setlist is obtained from the December 5, 2023, concert in Pittsburgh, Pennsylvania. It is not intended to represent all dates throughout the tour.

"Overture" (contains elements of "All I Want for Christmas Is You")

Fun Christmas

"Sugar Plum Fairy" (Magical Christmas Mix)

1. "Hark! The Herald Angels Sing / Gloria (In Excelsis Deo)"

"Santa Claus Is Comin' to Town" intro

2. "Oh Santa!"
3. "Christmas (Baby Please Come Home)"
4. "When Christmas Comes"
5. "Sleigh Ride"
6. "Here Comes Santa Claus (Right Down Santa Claus Lane) / House Top Celebration" (with Moroccan Cannon) (contains elements of "Give It to Me Baby" by Rick James)

"Christmas Wrapping" (performed by Monroe Cannon and Moroccan Cannon)
"Fall in Love at Christmas" (choir interlude)

Inspirational Christmas

7. "Silent Night"
8. "Jesus Born On This Day" (with Monroe Cannon)
9. "One Child"
10. "Joy to the World" (contains elements of the "Celebration Mix")
11. "Christmas Time Is in the Air Again"

MC Hit List

"My All" (new version with Christmas-themed lyrics) (choir and background singers interlude)

12. Medley:
  1. "Always Be My Baby"
  2. "Dreamlover"
  3. "Honey / Heartbreaker" (mashup)
  4. "A No No"
  5. "It's a Wrap"
  6. "Emotions"
  7. "Make It Happen"
  8. "Fly Like a Bird"
13. "We Belong Together" (contains elements of "Mimi's Late Night Valentine's Mix")
14. "Hero" (with extended outro)

Encore

"Santa Claus Is Comin' to Town" (Anniversary Mix) (video interlude)

15. "All I Want for Christmas Is You" (with extended outro)

==== Notes ====
- Jermaine Dupri joined Carey onstage to sing "Here Comes Santa Claus (Right Down Santa Claus Lane)" / "Housetop Celebration" at the Los Angeles and New York shows on November 17 and December 9 respectively.
- "All I Live For" was performed in Montreal.
- "The Roof (Back In Time)" and "Miss You Most (At Christmas Time)" were performed in Detroit.
- Ariana Grande and Jennifer Hudson joined Carey onstage to sing the remix of "Oh Santa!" at the New York show on December 9.
- Busta Rhymes joined Carey onstage to perform "I Know What You Want" at the New York show on December 17. It was also the only show to feature that song.

== Tour dates ==
=== Merry Christmas to All! ===
List of concerts, showing date, city, country, venue, opening acts, tickets sold, number of available tickets, and gross revenue
Date (2022)	City	Country	Venue	Opening act	Attendance	Revenue
December 9	Toronto	Canada	Scotiabank Arena	DJ Suss One		—N/a
December 11	Toronto	Canada	Scotiabank Arena	DJ Suss One		—N/a
December 13	New York City	United States	Madison Square Garden	DJ Suss One	23,484 / 23,484	$3,641,811
December 16	New York City	United States	Madison Square Garden	DJ Suss One	23,484 / 23,484	$3,641,811
Total						

=== Merry Christmas One and All! ===
List of concerts
Date (2023)	City	Country	Venue	Attendance	Revenue
November 15	Highland	United States	Yaamava' Resort & Casino	—	—
November 17	Los Angeles	United States	Hollywood Bowl	34,631 / 34,631	$6,229,487
November 19	Los Angeles	United States	Hollywood Bowl	34,631 / 34,631	$6,229,487
November 21	Denver	United States	Ball Arena	13,740 / 13,740	$1,489,916
November 24	Kansas City	United States	T-Mobile Center	12,833 / 12,833	$1,320,691
November 27	Toronto	Canada	Scotiabank Arena	13,528 / 13,528	$1,451,540
November 29	Montreal	Canada	Bell Centre	13,991 / 13,991	$1,328,821
December 1	Detroit	United States	Little Caesars Arena	14,846 / 14,846	$2,103,853
December 3	Chicago	United States	United Center	14,121 / 14,121	$2,229,761
December 5	Pittsburgh	United States	PPG Paints Arena	13,729 / 13,729	$1,490,530
December 7	Cleveland	United States	Rocket Mortgage FieldHouse	13,859 / 13,859	$1,610,665
December 9	New York City	United States	Madison Square Garden	14,349 / 14,349	$2,266,090
December 11	Boston	United States	TD Garden	13,062 / 13,062	$2,192,756
December 13	Philadelphia	United States	Wells Fargo Center	13,984 / 13,984	$1,815,016
December 15	Baltimore	United States	CFG Bank Arena	12,687 / 12,687	$1,829,219
December 17	New York City	United States	Madison Square Garden	14,349 / 14,349	$2,266,090
