= Bryan Tanaka =

- Born: Bryan Kekoa Tanaka; April 11, 1983 (age 43); Olympia, Washington, U.S.
- Occupations: Dancer, choreographer, creative director, actor
- Years active: 2004–present
- Website: bryantanaka.com

Bryan Kekoa Tanaka (IPA: [ˈbraɪən tæˈnɑːkə]; Olympia, Washington, born April 11, 1983) is a Japanese American dancer, choreographer, actor and creative director, best known for his work with global music icons such as Mariah Carey, Rihanna, Jennifer Lopez, Madonna, and Beyoncé. He is also known as Officer Alex in the series Beauty in Black.

== Career ==
Tanaka was born in Washington, in April 1983 to a Japanese father and American mother. Tanaka began his professional dance career in the mid-2000s. In 2004 he had the opportunity to perform with Destiny's Child during their Destiny Fulfilled... and Lovin' It tour, which allowed him to further showcase his talent to a wider audience. In 2006, he made a notable appearance as a dancer in Nelly Furtado’s "Maneater" music video, which helped expand his visibility. That same year, he joined Mariah Carey's The Adventures of Mimi' tour, marking the beginning of a long-standing professional relationship with the pop icon.

Bryan has since performed at major music award shows, including the Grammy Awards, MTV Video Music Awards, and MTV Europe Music Awards. He was nominated for the Best Choreography award at the 2010 MTV Video Music Awards for his work on "Video Phone". At the same event, he performed with Usher. In addition to his work as a choreographer and dancer, Bryan has also worked as a model and actor, featuring in ad campaigns for companies such as Nike, Pepsi, McDonald's, Old Navy, and iPod.

In early 2010, he created, directed, choreographed, and performed in the trilogy Hook vs Bridge, featuring music by Kevin Cossom. In the following years, Tanaka expanded his career in the entertainment industry, securing roles in major dance productions. He appeared in Step Up Revolution (2012) and performed on Dancing with the Stars. His collaboration with Beyoncé included participation in the I Am... World Tour and appearances in the music videos for "Run the World (Girls)" and "Love on Top", the latter of which he also contributed to choreographing. In 2014, he released his single "Bounce". Tanaka's longstanding professional relationship with Mariah Carey saw him join multiple tours, including the Sweet Sweet Fantasy Tour (2016). From 2017 onwards, he not only performed in but also served as the lead choreographer for the All the Hits Tour (2017), The Butterfly Returns residency (2018–2020), Caution World Tour (2019), and Carey's annual Christmas shows from 2016 to 2022.

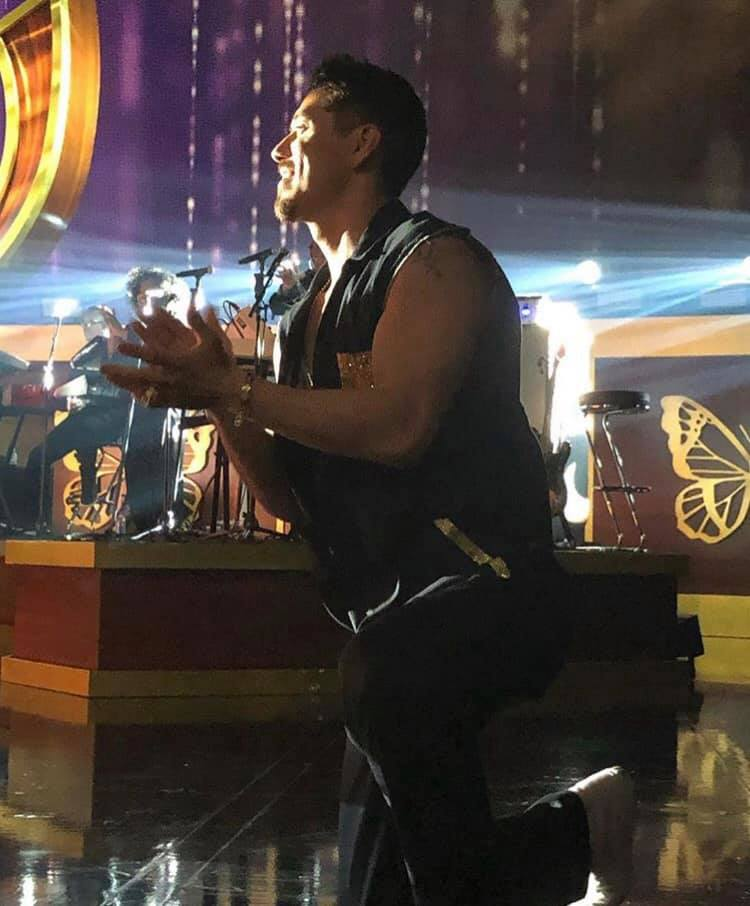
Tanaka performing "Fantasy" during The Butterfly Returns at Caesar Palace in July 2018

In 2024, Tanaka appeared in Tyler Perry's Netflix series Beauty in Black, portraying Officer Alex.

== Personal life ==
In October 2016, he began dating American singer-songwriter Mariah Carey. On December 26, 2023, Tanaka confirmed that he and Carey had parted ways after seven years of dating.

== Singles ==
- 2014: Bounce

== Music videos ==
- 2021: Fall in Love at Christmas - (Mariah Carey, Khalid and Kirk Franklin)
- 2019: A No No - (Mariah Carey)
- 2014: Bounce - (Bryan Tanaka)
- 2011: Love on Top - (Beyoncé)
- 2011: End of Time Live - (Beyoncé)
- 2011: Run the World (Girls) - (Beyoncé)
- 2011: On the Floor - (Jennifer Lopez feat. Pitbull)
- 2011: What a Feeling - (Kelly Rowland feat. Alex Gaudino)
- 2010: Te Amo - (Rihanna)
- 2009: Bad Boys - (Alexandra Burke feat. Florida)
- 2009: Video Phone - (Beyoncé)
- 2007: Upgrade U - (Beyoncé)
- 2007: Don't Stop The Music - (Rihanna)
- 2007: Shut Up and Drive - (Rihanna)
- 2007: Umbrella - (Rihanna)
- 2006: Maneater - (Nelly Furtado)

== Filmography ==
=== Television ===
- Entourage
- Dancing with The Stars
- Step Up Revolution
- All the Right Moves
- Beauty in Black (2024–26)

=== Film ===
- Bratz The Movie (2007)
- Good Girl Gone Bad: Live (2008)
- Fast & Furious
- Life Is But a Dream (2012)
- La La Land (2016)
- Mariah Carey's Magical Christmas Special (2020)
- Mariah's Christmas: The Magic Continues (2021)

=== Dance specials ===
- Hook vs Bridge
- The LXD: The Secrets of Ra
- Mariah's World

== Tours and residencies ==
- 2005: Destiny Fulfilled ... And Lovin' It - (Destiny's Child)
- 2006: The Adventures of Mimi Tour - (Mariah Carey)
- 2007-2009: The Good Girl Gone Bad Tour - (Rihanna)
- 2009-2010: I Am... Tour - (Beyoncé)
- 2010-2011: Last Girl on Earth Tour - (Rihanna)
- 2012-2015: DNA Tour - (Wanessa)
- 2016: Sweet Sweet Fantasy Tour - (Mariah Carey)
- 2016-2019: All I Want for Christmas Is You: A Night of Joy and Festivity - (Mariah Carey)
- 2018: Mariah Carey: Live in Concert - (Mariah Carey)
- 2018-2020: The Butterfly Returns - (Mariah Carey)
- 2019: Caution World Tour - (Mariah Carey)
- 2022: Merry Christmas to All! - (Mariah Carey)
