= Mariah Carey's Magical Christmas Special =

2020 television special

- Genre: Christmas special
- Written by: Caroline Fox
- Directed by: Hamish Hamilton; Roman Coppola
- Starring: Mariah Carey
- Composer: Mariah Carey
- Country of origin: United States
- Original language: English

Production
- Executive producers: Mariah Carey; Hamish Hamilton; Roman Coppola; Ian Stewart; Raj Kapoor; Ashley Edens
- Running time: 43 minutes
- Production company: Done and Dusted

Original release
- Network: Apple TV+
- Release: December 4, 2020

Mariah Carey's Magical Christmas Special is a Christmas special starring Mariah Carey that premiered on December 4, 2020, on Apple TV+. It was directed by Hamish Hamilton and Roman Coppola and executive-produced by Hamilton, Coppola, Carey, Ian Stewart, Raj Kapoor and Ashley Edens. The special centers around a holiday crisis in which the North Pole has to call Santa Claus's friend, Mariah Carey, to help.

The special features guest stars including Ariana Grande, Jennifer Hudson and Snoop Dogg. A soundtrack was released exclusively on Apple Music the day of the premiere and was released on other platforms a week later. The special received positive reviews with comparisons made to Christmas TV specials from the 20th century. In 2021, the special was nominated for a Primetime Emmy Award for Outstanding Contemporary Makeup.

== Plot ==
Santa Claus tasks Billy, his trusted elf-secretary, to raise everyone's spirits and make Christmas merry again. He calls Santa's friend Mariah Carey for help. Carey, however, is setting up Christmas in her New York City apartment with her two kids, Roc and Roe along with Little Mimi. Little Mimi is not as enthusiastic as the other two about Christmas. Carey receives a call from Billy, who desperately pleads for her help. Carey then reveals a sleigh behind her fireplace and flies off to help Billy ("Sleigh Ride" / "Hark! The Herald Angels Sing").

Arriving at the North Pole, Billy informs Carey that holiday cheer levels are at the lowest they have ever seen in which Carey responds that they should put on a festive Christmas concert to cheer up the world. At first Billy is skeptical that they don't have enough time, but Carey informs him of some of her achievements, (Note: Carey mentions her 15 studio albums, raising two children, writing her memoir The Meaning of Mariah Carey, the audiobook for the memoir and working out in high heels.) stating that she would be able to handle a show. As they work together to come up with a setlist ("When Christmas Comes"), Billy informs Carey that they do not have much time. Carey rebukes the idea of schedules when Woodstock flies in, and pulls the antennas on the TV to turn on the Peanuts segment. In the Peanuts segment, Linus and Charlie Brown are racking their brains trying to find out what they are missing for Christmas, only to figure out it is spending time with friends and family ("Christmas Time Is Here").

After Carey is settled into her cabin to take a rest before the concert, she sneaks off the toy factory to watch the elves make toys, sending Billy into a state of panic. She is joined by Ariana Grande, Jennifer Hudson, Snoop Dogg and Jermaine Dupri ("Oh Santa!" / "Here Comes Santa Claus (Right Down Santa Claus Lane) / House Top Celebration"). As the clock strikes six, the elves hurry out to watch a ballet performance by a Sugar Plum Fairy. Carey, however, goes out into the forest and gets lost with Billy, who went looking for her ("Christmas Time Is in the Air Again"). After taking a wrong shortcut, the two follow a star and they find their way out ("O Holy Night").

Carey wakes up in her apartment back in New York, telling Little Mimi and her kids that she was dreaming, only for Billy to reveal himself and start the Christmas concert ("Joy to the World"). Halfway through the concert, Billy accidentally cuts the power, causing Carey to sing a different song, under candlelight ("Silent Night"). After the song, Carey gives a heartwarming speech about celebrating love and light after a rough year. Christmas is saved, Carey performs an encore and Little Mimi regains her love for Christmas ("All I Want For Christmas Is You").

== Cast ==
- Mariah Carey as herself
- Billy Eichner as Billy, Santa's trust secretary
- Ariana Grande as herself
- Jennifer Hudson as herself
- Snoop Dogg as himself
- Jermaine Dupri as himself
- Tiffany Haddish as the narrator
- Misty Copeland as a Sugar Plum Fairy
- Mykal-Michelle Harris as Little Mimi

Amongst the cast, multiple celebrities make cameos, including Bette Midler, Heidi Klum and Millie Bobby Brown. Snoopy, Charlie Brown and the Peanuts gang make appearances in a guest segment as Apple (with WildBrain) has exclusive rights to Peanuts television content. Carey's children Moroccan and Monroe also make appearances.

== Production ==
Carey originally teased the Christmas special on social media, sharing a shot of three directors chairs with her, Ariana Grande and Jennifer Hudson's initials printed on them. The special was directed by Hamish Hamilton and Roman Coppola and filmed "under strict COVID-19 protocols". In an interview with The Hollywood Reporter, Carey stated that the "most important thing for her in terms of a vision for the special, was that the spirit of Christmas came through during a challenging 2020 dominated by the COVID-19 pandemic. She went on to say:

I know that for me, there's a certain spirit that happens during that time of year. I was even thinking about it the other day, sitting around wondering, why is it different for me when I look at Christmas decorations or decorate? But it is. There's just a different feeling that I get. It's like an actual, tangible feeling that comes over me that I just want everybody to feel this happy [...] I know everybody can't, but I wish that everybody could have the mindset of let's really make it through. Let's be unstoppable and power through this.

== Broadcast and promotion ==
Initially teased on social media, Carey appeared on Good Morning America, CBS and The Graham Norton Show to promote the soundtrack and the special. On Good Morning America, Carey stated that the special is "a way that people can share in the holiday spirit". Two days prior to the specials release on Apple TV+, Carey performed a medley of the songs, "Heroes", "Hero", and the 1994 version of "Joy to the World" from her album Merry Christmas, dedicated to the New York Frontline Workers. The special premiered two days later on December 4.

Although Apple TV+ does not release viewership data, Billboard and The Hollywood Reporter reported that Carey's special hit number one in more than 100 countries.

== Reception ==
=== Critical reception ===
Upon release, Mariah Carey's Magical Christmas Special received positive reviews. The special has a rating of 86% on Rotten Tomatoes based on 7 reviews. On Metacritic, the film has a score of 8.7 out of 10 based on 6 ratings. The Guardian wrote that Carey, "the Queen of Christmas, brings festive cheer by the bucketload" calling it a "musical extravaganza". Decider writer, Brett White, reviewed the special saying that "it's been five years since Mariah Carey graced us with a full-length Christmas special [...] and the world has changed a lot since Hallmark Channel aired Mariah Carey's Merriest Christmas in 2015". He went on to say that the special "could only be made by a Mariah Carey who knows what her fans want from her: they want to be gagged, they want the most, they want to be bewildered, befuddled, and bewitched by the elusive chanteuse." White went on to call it a "21st century revival of the kind of holiday specials that were mainstays on TV from the '60s through the '80s, hosted by everyone from Dean Martin to Dolly Parton."

The Detroit News writer, Adam Graham, gave a mixed-to-positive review stating that it was "not the tightest script that has ever been penned, but it gets Mariah to ride on a sleigh, visit a toy factory and sing her number 1 hit "All I Want for Christmas Is You" in the middle of the North Pole's town square. This is no time to worry about things like coherence and continuity". Graham went on to say that "the 44-minute musical ode to the magic of Christmas gives the holliest, jolliest diva of all a chance to parade around in a series of low-cut, cleavage-baring dresses while singing Christmas carols as wind machines blow her hair just so and her glittery eye shadow sparkles underneath the North Star". Daily Titan writer, Jiyo Cayabyab, stated that with the special, "Carey carried the world into the new year by ending the year on a high note". Jezebel writer, Rich Juzwiak, wrote that "Carey takes flight" in the special. He went on say that "the intended audience [...] is those who lavish in Carey's vast eccentricities". ITV writer, Emily Baker, gave the special four stars, calling the special "campy and jubilant, with lot of heart" and that "this was Carey in her absolute element". Baker went on to praise Carey's humour, saying that her "showmanship is second-to-none; her dedication to create joy and mesmerising performances are well documented; but what she never gets enough credit for is her sense of humour".

=== Actors response ===
Actress Tiffany Haddish praised the work Carey put in behind the scenes. She stated that while she "was watching Mariah, [she] wished [she] had some eggnog" calling the experience "magical". Grande also expressed her adoration on social media for getting to work with Carey on "Oh Santa!", sharing an old tweet of Grande saying "Mariah Carey I love you". Despite initial comparisons at the beginning of her career, Grande went on to praise Carey a month later on her Netflix documentary, Ariana Grande: Excuse Me, I Love You. Grande broke in tears saying that "It just means a lot to hear from her because my sound was so influenced by her and the 90's pop sound".

=== Accolades ===
Awards	Year	Category	Result	Ref.
Hollywood Makeup Artist and Hair Stylist Guild Awards	2021	Best Contemporary Hair Styling for a Television Special	Nominated	
Hollywood Makeup Artist and Hair Stylist Guild Awards	2021	Best Contemporary Make-Up for a Television Special	Nominated	
Imagen Awards	2021	Best Primetime Program – Special or Movie	Nominated	
Primetime Emmy Awards	2021	Outstanding Contemporary Makeup for a Variety, Nonfiction or Reality Program (Non-Prosthetic)	Nominated	

== Soundtrack ==
Mariah Carey's Magical Christmas Special (Apple TV+ Original Soundtrack)

Soundtrack album by Mariah Carey
- Released: December 4, 2020
- Recorded: 2020
- Genre: Christmas
- Length: 33:23
- Labels: Sony; Legacy
- Producers: Mariah Carey; Daniel Moore II; Marc Shaiman; Scott M. Riesett; Frank Wolf; Tremaine "Six7" Williams

Mariah Carey chronology
The Rarities (2020)	Mariah Carey's Magical Christmas Special (Apple TV+ Original Soundtrack) (2020)	Here for It All (2025)

Singles from Mariah Carey's Magical Christmas Special (Apple TV+ Original Soundtrack)
- 1. "Oh Santa!" Released: December 4, 2020

Mariah Carey's Magical Christmas Special (Apple TV+ Original Soundtrack) is the third Christmas album and second soundtrack album by American singer Mariah Carey. The soundtrack featured appearances by Ariana Grande, Jennifer Hudson, Jermaine Dupri and Snoop Dogg, and also included a cover of Leroy Anderson's "Sleigh Ride". It was released exclusively on Apple Music and iTunes Store on December 4, 2020, and was later released on other platforms on December 11, 2020.

=== Singles ===
The only single from the soundtrack, a re-recorded version of Carey's original Christmas song "Oh Santa!" (originally released in 2010 as the lead single from Carey's second Christmas album Merry Christmas II You), was released across all platforms on December 4. The new version included Grande and Hudson as featured artists. The song was received with high praise, and was described as a "girl group moment". The song peaked at number 76 on the US Billboard Hot 100, surpassing the original version's peak of number 100; and also charted in several European countries, including Germany, Sweden and the United Kingdom.

=== Critical reception ===
When released, the soundtrack received generally positive reviews. Brett White of Decider praised Carey and Grande's "harmonized whistle tones". He went on to praise the performances which "range from sincerely great (Carey's girl group number with Hudson and Grande is such a joy) to the completely unexpected (a Mariah/Peanuts mash-up—sure!) to the confounding. This special goes from Snoop Dogg rapping directly into Misty Copeland twirling to a version of "Dance of the Sugar Plum Fairy" headlined by Mariah's iconic whistle tone. It's pure merry madness". Adam Graham, writer for The Detroit News, called the soundtrack "wholesome and kid-friendly, an ode to Christmas specials of yore and delivered with a knowing wink and a nod".

=== Commercial performance ===
In the United States, the soundtrack album debuted at number three on the Billboard Soundtrack Albums chart. It became her first top-three hit on the chart since her eighth studio album Glitter (2001), a soundtrack from the film of the same name, which reached number one. The album also debuted at number 100 on the Billboard 200 chart. The soundtrack also reached the top-ten on the UK Soundtrack Albums chart.

Carey's rendition of "Sleigh Ride" reached 25 on the US R&B/Hip-Hop Digital Songs chart. Her 2021 re-recording of "All I Want for Christmas Is You", called the "Magical Christmas Mix" version, also charted at number 25 on the US Holiday Digital Songs.

=== Track listing ===
Credits adapted from Tidal.

No.	Title	Writer(s)	Producer(s)	Length
1.	"Overture "Little Mariah's" Theme"	Mariah Carey; Daniel Moore II	Carey; Moore	0:14
2.	"Sleigh Ride"	Leroy Anderson; Mitchell Parish	Carey; Moore; Marc Shaiman; Scott M. Riesett; Frank Wolf; Tremaine "Six7" Williams^{[a]}	2:39
3.	"Hark! The Herald Angels Sing" (Interlude)	Traditional	Carey; Moore; Shaiman; Riesett; Wolf	0:19
4.	"When Christmas Comes" (Magical Christmas Mix)	Carey; James Poyser	Carey; Moore	2:27
5.	"Let It Snow! Let It Snow! Let It Snow!" (Outro)	Sammy Cahn; Jule Styne	Carey; Moore	0:13
6.	"Peanuts...All I Want" (Interlude)	Carey; Walter Afanasieff		0:43
7.	"Christmas Time Is Here"	Vince Guaraldi; Lee Mendelson	Carey; Moore	1:58
8.	"Santa Claus Is Coming to Town" (Intro)	J. Fred Coots; Haven Gillespie	Carey; Moore; Shaiman; Riesett; Wolf; Williams^{[a]}	0:25
9.	"Oh Santa!" (featuring Ariana Grande & Jennifer Hudson)	Carey; Jermaine Dupri; Bryan-Michael Cox	Carey; Moore; Shaiman; Riesett; Williams^{[a]}	3:20
10.	"Here Comes Santa Claus (Right Down Santa Claus Lane) / House Top Celebration" (featuring Snoop Dogg & Jermaine Dupri)	Oakley Haldeman; Gene Autry	Carey; Moore; Williams^{[a]}	2:20
11.	"Sugar Plum Fairy" (Magical Christmas Mix)	Traditional	Carey; Moore; Shaiman; Riesett; Wolf	1:18
12.	"Christmas Time Is in the Air Again" (Magical Christmas Mix)	Carey; Shaiman	Carey; Moore; Shaiman; Riesett; Wolf	3:04
13.	"O Holy Night" (Magical Christmas Mix)	Adolphe Adam	Carey; Moore	2:50
14.	"Joy to the World" (Magical Christmas Mix)	Traditional; Hoyt Axton	Carey; Moore	4:11
15.	"Silent Night" (Magical Christmas Mix)	Traditional	Carey; Moore	2:28
16.	"All I Want for Christmas Is You" (Magical Christmas Mix)	Carey; Afanasieff	Carey; Moore; Shaiman; Riesett; Wolf	4:29
17.	"Little Mimi's Theme" (Magical Christmas Mix)	Carey; Moore	Carey; Moore	0:17
Total length:				33:23

Notes

- ^{^[a]}signifies a co-producer

=== Charts ===
Chart (2020–2022)	Peak position
Canadian Albums (Billboard)	99
Irish Albums (Official Charts)	47
Japan Hot Albums (Billboard Japan)	100
Swiss Albums (Schweizer Hitparade)	37
UK Album Downloads (Official Charts)	18
UK Soundtrack Albums (Official Charts)	10
US Billboard 200	100
US Soundtrack Albums (Billboard)	3
US Top Holiday Albums (Billboard)	28
US Top R&B/Hip-Hop Albums (Billboard)	40

== The Magic Continues ==
In 2021, Apple TV+ released a follow-up special titled Mariah's Christmas: The Magic Continues. The 18 minute special featured performances of "Fall in Love at Christmas", "Christmas (Baby Please Come Home)" and an interview with Zane Lowe. The special was executive produced by Carey, Tim Case, Charleen Manca, and Matthew Turke and directed by Joseph Kahn.
