= All I Want for Christmas Is You: A Night of Joy and Festivity =

2014–19 concert residency and tour by Mariah Carey

- Residency by Mariah Carey
- Location: North America; Europe
- Venue: Various
- Associated albums: Merry Christmas; Merry Christmas II You
- Start date: December 15, 2014
- End date: December 15, 2019
- Legs: 8
- No. of shows: 56
- Attendance: 222,308
- Box office: $22,524,202

Mariah Carey concert chronology
- The Elusive Chanteuse Show (2014); All I Want for Christmas Is You, a Night of Joy & Festivity (2014–19); #1 to Infinity (2015–17)
Mariah Carey's Christmas tour chronology
All I Want for Christmas Is You: A Night of Joy and Festivity (2014–2019)	Merry Christmas to All! / Merry Christmas One and All! (2022–2023)
Mariah Carey's concert residency chronology
Live at the Pearl (2009)	All I Want for Christmas Is You: A Night of Joy and Festivity (2014–2019)	#1 to Infinity (2015–2017)

All I Want for Christmas Is You: A Night of Joy and Festivity was the second concert residency by American singer-songwriter Mariah Carey. Originally performed annually at the Beacon Theatre in Manhattan, New York, the residency began December 15, 2014, and ended December 15, 2019, after completing eight legs and fifty-six shows in various countries around the world. The main set list for the show encompassed songs from Merry Christmas and Merry Christmas II You, alongside additional non-holiday tracks from Carey's discography.

== Background and development ==
Mariah Carey released her fourteenth studio album, titled Me. I Am Mariah... The Elusive Chanteuse, on May 27, 2014. It debuted at number three on the Billboard 200 album chart with opening week sales of 58,000 copies in the United States, and number one on the Top R&B/Hip-Hop Albums chart. Carey embarked on her eighth concert tour called The Elusive Chanteuse Show in October and November later that year, whereby she performed concerts throughout East Asia, South East Asia and Australasia. During the Australasian leg, Carey announced that she would take up residency at the Beacon Theatre in the New York City borough of Manhattan to be performed annually in December, as a twentieth anniversary celebration of the release of her first Christmas album, Merry Christmas, in 1994, as well as her second Christmas album, Merry Christmas II You (2010). Carey said in an announcement "I can't imagine being anywhere more special than live on stage, in my hometown, celebrating with my fans during the Christmas season, my most treasured time of the year, I can't wait!"

== Critical reception ==
Jim Farber of the New York Daily News stated that while Carey "seemed nervous and out-of-breath," the show had "a strange allure." Steven J. Horowitz from Billboard praised the singer's first performance at the venue, writing: "Carey accomplished what she came to do: spread Christmas cheer." Jon Caramanica from The New York Times who also reviewed the first show wrote the singer felt "utterly at ease" and commended her engagement with the audience.

== Commercial performance ==
Following the announcement of the residency in October 2014, tickets for shows on December 15, 16, 18 and 20 went on pre-sale on November 3 for Citigroup cardholders, while general release followed a week later on November 10. Additional dates for December 21 and 22 were later released. Billboard later announced that the six dates generated a 100% attendance, with Carey playing to a total of 16,196 people and the shows grossing $1,563,173 in total.

In October 2015, a new string of dates were announced once again at the Beacon Theatre with tickets available on October 17 via Ticketmaster.

== Set list ==
1. "Sugar Plum Fairy Introlude" (Ballet Introduction)
2. "Hark! The Herald Angels Sing" / "Gloria (In Excelsis Deo)"
3. "Charlie Brown Christmas"
4. "Fantasy" (Interlude)
5. "Oh Santa!"
6. "Christmas (Baby Please Come Home)"
7. "Santa Claus Is Comin' to Town" / "Rudolph the Red-Nosed Reindeer" / "Jingle Bells" (Children's Choir Interlude)
8. "Jesus Oh What a Wonderful Child" (Interlude) (Performed by Trey Lorenz and choir)
9. "Silent Night"
10. "Joy to the World"
11. "This Christmas" (Band Interlude)
12. "When Christmas Comes"
13. "Here Comes Santa Claus (Right Down Santa Claus Lane) / Housetop Celebration"
14. "I Saw Mommy Kissing Santa Claus" (Children's Choir Interlude)
15. "Carol of the Bells" (Dance Interlude) (contains elements from "Sing We Now of Christmas")
16. "Christmas Time Is in the Air Again"
17. "O Holy Night"
18. "Emotions"
19. "We Belong Together"
20. "Hero"

Encore

21. "All I Want for Christmas Is You"
22. "All I Want for Christmas Is You Reprise" (Outro)
Notes
- "We Belong Together" was added to the set list on December 18, 2014.
- On December 7, 2016, John Legend joined Carey during the performance of "When Christmas Comes" on the sixteenth night.^{[13]}
- On December 8, 2016, R. Kelly joined Carey onstage to perform "The Christmas Song", in place of "Christmas Time Is in the Air Again".^{[14]}
- On December 23, 2016, Jussie Smollett joined Carey during the performance of "Christmas Time Is in the Air Again".
- "The Star" was temporarily sung on December 2, 2017 to November 30, 2019.
- "Emotions" was not performed on select dates in Europe.
- "Que je t'aime" was performed on the first show in Paris.
- A snippet of "Miss You Most (At Christmas time)" was performed on the third Las Vegas show and in Brussels.
- Starting on December 1, 2018, a piano interlude of "God Rest Ye Merry Gentlemen" replaced the "I Saw Mommy Kissing Santa Claus" interlude.
- "The Distance" was performed from December 1 to 17, 2018.
- A snippet of "One Child" was performed in Leeds.
- A snippet of "Caution" was performed in Brussels.
- A snippet of "Jesus Born On This Day" was performed in Madrid.
- Starting on November 22, the "Santa Medley" interlude was replaced by a performance of "Rudolph the Red-Nosed Reindeer" by Mariah's children.
- From November 23 to December 13, 2019, "Always Be My Baby" temporarily replaced "We Belong Together".
- On December 7, 2019, an interlude of "This Christmas" sung by the background singers was added.

== Shows ==
Date	City	Country	Venue	Attendance	Revenue
Leg 1 — North America
December 15, 2014	New York City	United States	Beacon Theatre	16,196 / 16,196	$1,563,173
December 16, 2014	New York City	United States	Beacon Theatre	16,196 / 16,196	$1,563,173
December 18, 2014	New York City	United States	Beacon Theatre	16,196 / 16,196	$1,563,173
December 20, 2014	New York City	United States	Beacon Theatre	16,196 / 16,196	$1,563,173
December 21, 2014	New York City	United States	Beacon Theatre	16,196 / 16,196	$1,563,173
December 22, 2014	New York City	United States	Beacon Theatre	16,196 / 16,196	$1,563,173
Leg 2 — North America
December 8, 2015	New York City	United States	Beacon Theatre	20,720 / 20,720	$2,054,071
December 9, 2015	New York City	United States	Beacon Theatre	20,720 / 20,720	$2,054,071
December 11, 2015	New York City	United States	Beacon Theatre	20,720 / 20,720	$2,054,071
December 12, 2015	New York City	United States	Beacon Theatre	20,720 / 20,720	$2,054,071
December 14, 2015	New York City	United States	Beacon Theatre	20,720 / 20,720	$2,054,071
December 15, 2015	New York City	United States	Beacon Theatre	20,720 / 20,720	$2,054,071
December 17, 2015	New York City	United States	Beacon Theatre	20,720 / 20,720	$2,054,071
December 18, 2015	New York City	United States	Beacon Theatre	20,720 / 20,720	$2,054,071
Leg 3 — North America
December 5, 2016	New York City	United States	Beacon Theatre	23,392 / 24,169	$2,369,921
December 7, 2016	New York City	United States	Beacon Theatre	23,392 / 24,169	$2,369,921
December 8, 2016	New York City	United States	Beacon Theatre	23,392 / 24,169	$2,369,921
December 10, 2016	New York City	United States	Beacon Theatre	23,392 / 24,169	$2,369,921
December 11, 2016	New York City	United States	Beacon Theatre	23,392 / 24,169	$2,369,921
December 13, 2016	New York City	United States	Beacon Theatre	23,392 / 24,169	$2,369,921
December 14, 2016	New York City	United States	Beacon Theatre	23,392 / 24,169	$2,369,921
December 16, 2016	New York City	United States	Beacon Theatre	23,392 / 24,169	$2,369,921
December 17, 2016	New York City	United States	Beacon Theatre	23,392 / 24,169	$2,369,921
Leg 4 — North America
December 2, 2017	New York City	United States	Beacon Theatre	8,127 / 8,127	$847,479
December 4, 2017	New York City	United States	Beacon Theatre	8,127 / 8,127	$847,479
December 5, 2017	New York City	United States	Beacon Theatre	8,127 / 8,127	$847,479
Leg 5 — Europe
December 9, 2017	Paris	France	AccorHotels Arena	6,479 / 7,622	$645,330
December 10, 2017	Manchester	England	Manchester Arena	9,371 / 9,371	$927,176
December 11, 2017	London	England	The O2 Arena	15,074 / 16,290	$1,525,000
Leg 6 — North America
December 14, 2017	Las Vegas	United States	The Colosseum at Caesars Palace	14,533 / 17,434	$1,897,495
December 16, 2017	Las Vegas	United States	The Colosseum at Caesars Palace	14,533 / 17,434	$1,897,495
December 17, 2017	Las Vegas	United States	The Colosseum at Caesars Palace	14,533 / 17,434	$1,897,495
December 20, 2017	Las Vegas	United States	The Colosseum at Caesars Palace	14,533 / 17,434	$1,897,495
December 22, 2017	Las Vegas	United States	The Colosseum at Caesars Palace	14,533 / 17,434	$1,897,495
Leg 7 — Europe
December 1, 2018	Stavanger	Norway	Sørmarka Arena	—N/a	—N/a
December 3, 2018	Gothenburg	Sweden	Scandinavium	—N/a	—N/a
December 4, 2018	Copenhagen	Denmark	Royal Arena	—N/a	—N/a
December 5, 2018	Berlin	Germany	Mercedes-Benz Arena	7,535 / 7,535	$513,894
December 7, 2018	Paris	France	AccorHotels Arena	5,308 / 7,800	$501,640
December 9, 2018	Nottingham	England	Motorpoint Arena Nottingham	5,553 / 6,200	$467,977
December 10, 2018	Leeds	England	First Direct Arena	5,102 / 5,102	$392,522
December 11, 2018	London	England	The O2 Arena	11,212 / 15,140	$1,163,710
December 13, 2018	Amsterdam	Netherlands	Ziggo Dome	8,024 / 8,024	$606,854
December 14, 2018	Brussels	Belgium	Forest National	6,226 / 6,226	$436,474
December 17, 2018	Madrid	Spain	WiZink Center	6,552 / 6,552	$758,973
Leg 8 — North America
November 22, 2019	Las Vegas	United States	The Colosseum at Caesars Palace	17,483 / 17,483	$2,710,305
November 23, 2019	Las Vegas	United States	The Colosseum at Caesars Palace	17,483 / 17,483	$2,710,305
November 27, 2019	Las Vegas	United States	The Colosseum at Caesars Palace	17,483 / 17,483	$2,710,305
November 29, 2019	Las Vegas	United States	The Colosseum at Caesars Palace	17,483 / 17,483	$2,710,305
November 30, 2019	Las Vegas	United States	The Colosseum at Caesars Palace	17,483 / 17,483	$2,710,305
December 7, 2019	Atlantic City	United States	Hard Rock Live	7,000 / 7,000	
December 9, 2019	Oxon Hill	United States	The Theater at MGM	6,244 / 6,244	$827,461
December 10, 2019	Oxon Hill	United States	The Theater at MGM	6,244 / 6,244	$827,461
December 12, 2019	Uncasville	United States	Mohegan Sun Arena	5,835 / 5,835	$494,792
December 13, 2019	Boston	United States	Wang Theatre	3,347 / 3,347	$451,589
December 15, 2019	New York City	United States	Madison Square Garden	12,995 / 12,995	$1,368,366
Total				222,308 / 235,412 (94%)	$22,524,202

== Cancelled shows ==
Date	City	Country	Venue	Reason
November 17, 2017	Windsor	Canada	Caesars Windsor	Upper respiratory infection
November 18, 2017	Chicago	United States	Chicago Theatre	Upper respiratory infection
November 20, 2017	Bethlehem	United States	Sands Bethlehem Event Center	Upper respiratory infection
November 21, 2017	Niagara Falls	United States	Seneca Niagara Events Center	Upper respiratory infection
November 22, 2017	Northfield	United States	Hard Rock Rocksino Northfield Park	Upper respiratory infection
November 24, 2017	Oxon Hill	United States	MGM National Harbor	Upper respiratory infection
November 25, 2017	Atlantic City	United States	Borgata Hotel Casino & Spa	Upper respiratory infection
November 27, 2017	New York City	United States	Beacon Theatre	Upper respiratory infection
November 28, 2017	New York City	United States	Beacon Theatre	Upper respiratory infection
December 1, 2017	New York City	United States	Beacon Theatre	Upper respiratory infection
November 28, 2020	Honolulu	United States	Neal S. Blaisdell Arena	COVID-19 pandemic
