= Auld Lang Syne (The New Year's Anthem) =

- The Remixes cover

Single by Mariah Carey

from the album Merry Christmas II You
- Released: December 14, 2010
- Recorded: 2010
- Studio: Henson Studios; Westlake Recording Studios
- Genre: EDM; dance-pop; house
- Length: 3:47
- Label: Island Def Jam
- Songwriters: Mariah Carey; Randy Jackson; Johnny "Sev" Severin (RedOne); Robert Burns
- Producers: Carey; Jackson; Severin

Mariah Carey singles chronology
"Oh Santa!" (2010)	"Auld Lang Syne (The New Year's Anthem)" (2010)	"When Christmas Comes" (2011)

Music video
- "Auld Lang Syne (The New Year's Anthem)" on YouTube

"Auld Lang Syne (The New Year's Anthem)" is a song by American singer-songwriter Mariah Carey from her second Christmas album and thirteenth studio album, Merry Christmas II You (2010). The second single from the album, an extended play consisting of nine remixes was released by Island on December 14, 2010. Using the Robert Burns poem "Auld Lang Syne," Carey along with Randy Jackson and Johnny "Sev" Severin (of RedOne) composed a new arrangement, added lyrics and re-titled it.

The track garnered a negative response from critics, all of whom disliked how Carey had changed the poem into a house song. An accompanying music video features a pregnant Carey singing in front of a background of exploding fireworks. "Auld Lang Syne (The New Year's Anthem)" charted on the lower regions of the South Korean international singles charts and at number nine on the US Holiday Digital Songs chart.

== Background and composition ==
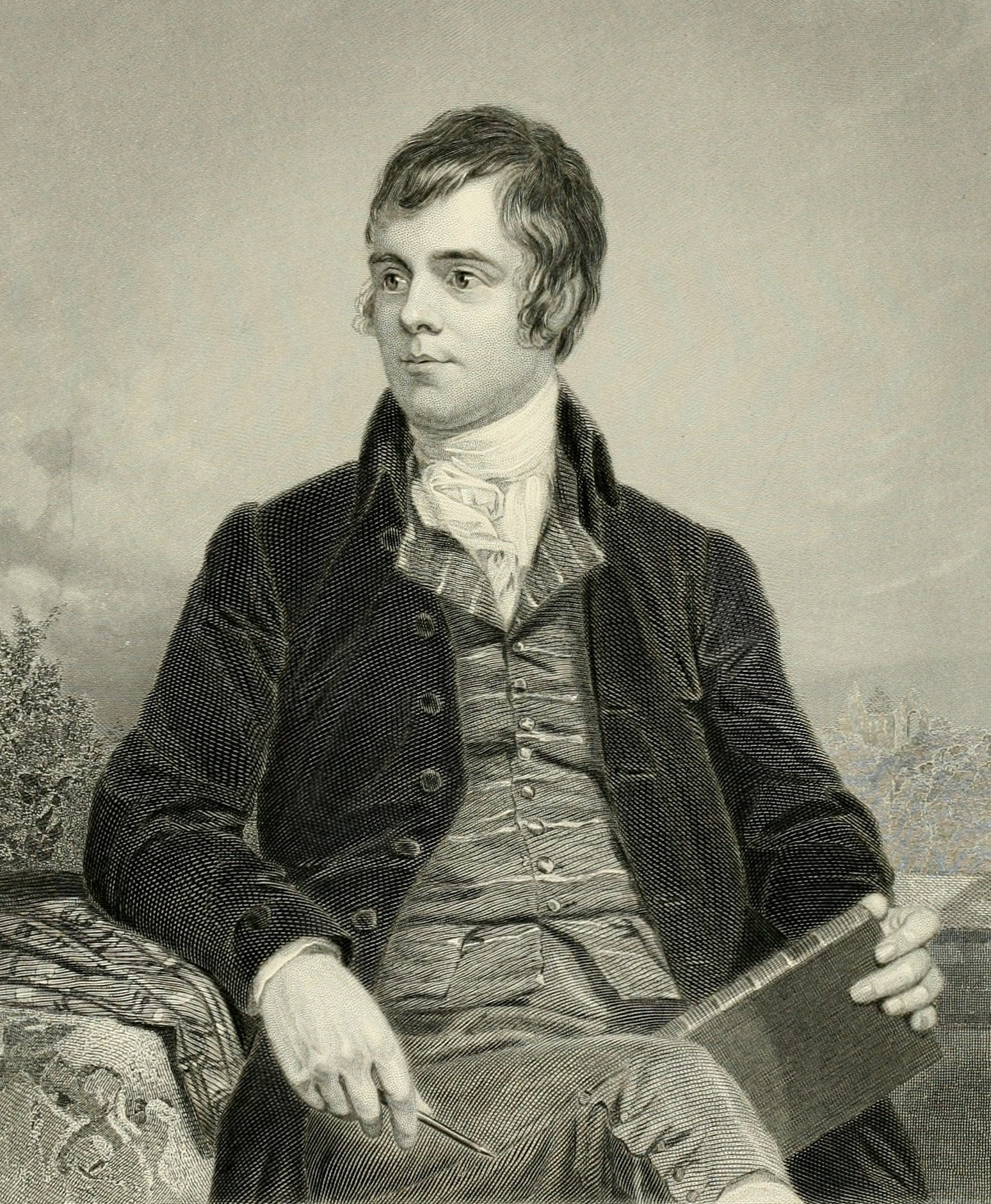
"Auld Lang Syne (The New Year's Anthem)" is a re-write of "Auld Lang Syne" by Robert Burns.

"Auld Lang Syne (The New Year's Anthem)" is a re-write of "Auld Lang Syne" by Scottish poet and lyricist Robert Burns, which was written in 1788 and published in James Johnson's Scots Musical Museum in 1796. As noted by the BBC's Pauline Mackay, Burns often re-arranged and rewrote old songs before publishing them as his own work, and is thus listed under the public domain.

Mariah Carey's version is a new arrangement that uses some of the original lyrics by Burns, and was composed by Carey with Randy Jackson and Johnny "Sev" Severin. The singer's vocals were recorded by Brian Garten at Henson Studios and Westlake Recording Studios, both located in Los Angeles, California.

The music for the song was recorded by Severin, Keith Gretlein and Garten. It was mixed by Phil Tan and Damien Lewis at The Ninja Beat Club in Atlanta, Georgia. All instrumentation was performed by Severin, apart from the piano which was played by James "Big Jim" Wright. Background vocals were performed by Melonie Daniels, Sherry McGhee and Onitsha Shaw. Rye Songs administered by songs of Universal (BMI)/Hope Faith Destiny Music Group (BMI); 2101 Songs Admin. By Sony/ATV (BMI). Johnny "Sev" Severin appears on behalf of RedOne Productions.

It appears as the thirteenth and final song on the standard track listing of Merry Christmas II You (2010). On December 14, 2010, Carey released Extended play of nine remixes by (five by Ralphi Rosario and four by Johnny Vicious) as a digital download on iTunes. "Auld Lang Syne (The New Year's Anthem)" is a house track with a "thumping" instrumental according to Rich Juzwiak of The Village Voice, that lasts for three minutes and forty-seven seconds. At one point in the song, Carey says "Does anybody really know the words?"

== Critical reception ==
"Auld Lang Syne (The New Year's Anthem)" garnered a negative response from critics. Mike Diver of the BBC wrote that Carey shows restraint for the most part of the album, but "Auld Lang Syne (The New Year's Anthem)" as the final track is "slathered in cheesy beats". Rolling Stone writer Caryn Ganz disapproved of the dance beat, saying "It's hard to figure out what's 'extra festive' (as the full song title promises) about her 'All I Want for Christmas Is You' update, and far easier to determine what's wrong with 'Auld Lang Syne' (an awkward dance beat)." Juzwiak was critical of the song, describing it as "robotic".

== Music video ==
A music video for "Auld Lang Syne (The New Year's Anthem)", directed by Carey herself, was released on December 15, 2010. A pregnant Carey, who only moves from the waist up, wears a black laced dress while standing in front of a green screen, which depict exploding fireworks in the nights sky. Becky Bain for Idolator positively reviewed the video, writing "There is something so endlessly entertaining about watching Mariah Carey do her patented diva theatrics — waving her arms like a crazy hand model; tenderly stroking her hair; spinning around dramatically."

== Track listings ==
- Digital download (Album Version)
1. "Auld Lang Syne (The New Year's Anthem)" – 3:47
- Digital download (Remixes)
1. "Auld Lang Syne (The New Year's Anthem)" [Ralphi Rosario Traditional Club Mix] – 7:55
2. "Auld Lang Syne (The New Year's Anthem)" [Rosario Traditional Mixshow] – 6:11
3. "Auld Lang Syne (The New Year's Anthem)" [Rosario Traditional Radio Edit] – 4:13
4. "Auld Lang Syne (The New Year's Anthem)" [Ralphi's Alternative Club Mix] – 6:07
5. "Auld Lang Syne (The New Year's Anthem)" [Ralphi's Alternative Mixshow Edit] – 5:21
6. "Auld Lang Syne (The New Year's Anthem)" [Johnny Vicious Warehouse Mix] – 6:44
7. "Auld Lang Syne (The New Year's Anthem)" [Johnny Vicious Warehouse Radio] – 3:14
8. "Auld Lang Syne (The New Year's Anthem)" [Johnny Vicious Warehouse Dub] – 7:37
9. "Auld Lang Syne (The New Year's Anthem)" [Johnny Vicious Warehouse Mix] {No Vocal Intro} – 5:39

== Charts ==
Chart (2010–2020)	Peak position
South Korea International (Circle)	97
US Dance Singles Sales (Billboard)	5
US Holiday Digital Song Sales (Billboard)	1
US Hot R&B/Hip-Hop Singles Sales (Billboard)	7

== Release history ==
Country	Date	Format	Label
United States	December 14, 2010	Digital download (EP remixes)	Island Records
