= List of Billboard number-one R&B/hip-hop albums of 2010 =

This page lists the albums that reached number one on the Top R&B/Hip-Hop Albums and Top Rap Albums charts in 2010. The Rap Albums chart partially serves as a distillation of rap-specific titles from the overall R&B/Hip-Hop Albums chart.

== Chart history ==
Key
| † | Indicates best-performing album of 2010 |

| Issue date | R&B/Hip-Hop Albums | Artist(s) | Rap Albums | Artist(s) | Refs. |
|---|---|---|---|---|---|
| January 2 | The Element of Freedom | Alicia Keys | The State vs. Radric Davis | Gucci Mane | |
| January 9 | Stronger with Each Tear | Mary J. Blige | We Are Young Money | Young Money | |
| January 16 | The Element of Freedom | Alicia Keys | We Are Young Money | Young Money | |
| January 23 | The Element of Freedom | Alicia Keys | We Are Young Money | Young Money | |
| January 30 | The Element of Freedom | Alicia Keys | We Are Young Money | Young Money | |
| February 6 | The Element of Freedom | Alicia Keys | We Are Young Money | Young Money | |
| February 13 | Michael Jackson's This Is It | Michael Jackson | We Are Young Money | Young Money | |
| February 20 | Rebirth | Lil Wayne | Rebirth | Lil Wayne | |
| February 27 | Soldier of Love | Sade | Rebirth | Lil Wayne | |
| March 6 | Soldier of Love | Sade | Rebirth | Lil Wayne | |
| March 13 | Soldier of Love | Sade | Rebirth | Lil Wayne | |
| March 20 | Soldier of Love | Sade | Rebirth | Lil Wayne | |
| March 27 | Battle of the Sexes | Ludacris | Battle of the Sexes | Ludacris | |
| April 3 | Here I Am | Marvin Sapp | Battle of the Sexes | Ludacris | |
| April 10 | Still Standing | Monica | Battle of the Sexes | Ludacris | |
| April 17 | Raymond vs. Raymond | Usher | Battle of the Sexes | Ludacris | |
| April 24 | Raymond vs. Raymond | Usher | Battle of the Sexes | Ludacris | |
| May 1 | Raymond vs. Raymond | Usher | Battle of the Sexes | Ludacris | |
| May 8 | Raymond vs. Raymond | Usher | Battle of the Sexes | Ludacris | |
| May 15 | B.o.B Presents: The Adventures of Bobby Ray | B.o.B | B.o.B Presents: The Adventures of Bobby Ray | B.o.B | |
| May 22 | Pulse | Toni Braxton | B.o.B Presents: The Adventures of Bobby Ray | B.o.B | |
| May 29 | Raymond vs. Raymond | Usher | B.o.B Presents: The Adventures of Bobby Ray | B.o.B | |
| June 5 | Distant Relatives | Nas and Damian Marley | Distant Relatives | Nas and Damian Marley | |
| June 12 | Raymond vs. Raymond | Usher | Distant Relatives | Nas and Damian Marley | |
| June 19 | Raymond vs. Raymond | Usher | B.o.B Presents: The Adventures of Bobby Ray | B.o.B | |
| June 26 | Raymond vs. Raymond | Usher | Goon Affiliated | Plies | |
| July 3 | Thank Me Later | Drake | Thank Me Later | Drake | |
| July 10 | Recovery † | Eminem | Recovery † | Eminem | |
| July 17 | Recovery † | Eminem | Recovery † | Eminem | |
| July 24 | Recovery † | Eminem | Recovery † | Eminem | |
| July 31 | Recovery † | Eminem | Recovery † | Eminem | |
| August 7 | Recovery † | Eminem | Recovery † | Eminem | |
| August 14 | Recovery † | Eminem | Recovery † | Eminem | |
| August 21 | Recovery † | Eminem | Recovery † | Eminem | |
| August 28 | Recovery † | Eminem | Recovery † | Eminem | |
| September 4 | Recovery † | Eminem | Recovery † | Eminem | |
| September 11 | Back to Me | Fantasia | Recovery † | Eminem | |
| September 18 | Recovery † | Eminem | Recovery † | Eminem | |
| September 25 | Recovery † | Eminem | Recovery † | Eminem | |
| October 2 | Passion, Pain & Pleasure | Trey Songz | Recovery † | Eminem | |
| October 9 | Recovery † | Eminem | Recovery † | Eminem | |
| October 16 | I Am Not a Human Being | Lil Wayne | I Am Not a Human Being | Lil Wayne | |
| October 23 | Recovery † | Eminem | Recovery † | Eminem | |
| October 30 | I Am Not a Human Being | Lil Wayne | I Am Not a Human Being | Lil Wayne | |
| November 6 | I Am Not a Human Being | Lil Wayne | I Am Not a Human Being | Lil Wayne | |
| November 13 | I Am Not a Human Being | Lil Wayne | I Am Not a Human Being | Lil Wayne | |
| November 20 | Merry Christmas II You | Mariah Carey | I Am Not a Human Being | Lil Wayne | |
| November 27 | Man on the Moon II: The Legend of Mr. Rager | Kid Cudi | Man on the Moon II: The Legend of Mr. Rager | Kid Cudi | |
| December 4 | Loud | Rihanna | 5.0 | Nelly | |
| December 11 | My Beautiful Dark Twisted Fantasy | Kanye West | My Beautiful Dark Twisted Fantasy | Kanye West | |
| December 18 | My Beautiful Dark Twisted Fantasy | Kanye West | My Beautiful Dark Twisted Fantasy | Kanye West | |
| December 25 | No Mercy | T.I. | No Mercy | T.I. | |

== See also ==
- 2010 in music
- 2010 in hip hop music
- List of number-one R&B/hip-hop songs of 2010 (U.S.)
- List of Billboard 200 number-one albums of 2010
