= Christmas Time Is in the Air Again =

Promotional single by Mariah Carey

from the album Merry Christmas II You
- Released: December 2, 2012
- Studio: Henson Studios; 20th Century Fox Scoring Stage; Guardian Angel Studios; Germano Studios; Capitol Recording Studios
- Genre: Christmas
- Length: 3:01
- Label: Island Def Jam
- Songwriters: Mariah Carey; Marc Shaiman
- Producers: Carey; Shaiman

"Christmas Time Is in the Air Again" is a song by American singer-songwriter Mariah Carey from her second Christmas album and thirteenth studio album, Merry Christmas II You (2010). It was written and produced by Carey in collaboration with Broadway composer Marc Shaiman. Lyrically, it is about finding love during the Christmas season. The track garnered positive reviews from critics, with one describing it as an outstanding performance and the only song on the album that could compare to one of Carey's previous Christmas singles, "All I Want for Christmas Is You". It was released as a promotional single in December 2012. An accompanying lyric video was released, and Carey has performed "Christmas Time Is in the Air Again" live on NBC's Christmas in Rockefeller Centre event and during her December 2014 Beacon Theatre residency called All I Want For Christmas Is You, A Night of Joy & Festivity.

== Background and composition ==
"Christmas Time is in the Air Again" is an original composition written and produced by Carey with Broadway composer Marc Shaiman for Carey's second Christmas album/thirteenth studio album Merry Christmas II You (2010). It was recorded by Brian Garten at multiple recording studios, including Henson Studios, 20th Century Fox Scoring Stage, Guardian Angel Studios, Germano Studios, Capitol Recording Studios, while it was mixed by Phil Tan and assistant Damien Lewis at The Ninja Beat Club. An extensive list of additional and assistant engineers were enlisted in the production of the track: Brett "Snacky" Pierce, Scott Risett, Kenta Yonesaka, Alex Guapera, Charlie Paakkari, Tim Lauber, Tom Steel, Greg Dennon, Denis St. Amand. Aside from being credited as a songwriter and producer, the song was orchestrated and arranged by Shaiman, who also performed the piano.

The ballad begins with Carey singing "Oh, Christmas time is in the air again" in her "whisper register", backed by a string section performed by Mike Valerio on the upright bass and George Doering playing the guitar. Other instrumentalists who performed on the bell and chime embellished track were Victor Indrizzo on the drums and Luis Conte on percussion. The orchestra was recorded and pre-mixed by John Richards and the concertmaster was Ralph Morrison; Shari Sutcliffe was enlisted as the orchestra contractor. Lyrically, the track is about falling in love during the Christmas season. Set in the key of D♭ major, then it key changes to D major, the song has a "slow" feel and a tempo of 50 beats per minute; Carey's voice spans just short of two octaves from F♯_{3} to E_{5}. On November 26, 2012, Carey announced via her Twitter account that "Christmas Time Is in the Air Again" would be released as a promotional single.

== Critical reception ==
The Village Voice writer Rich Juzwiak felt that "Christmas Time Is in the Air Again" was the only song on Merry Christmas II You that matched "the magic" of her 1994 single "All I Want for Christmas Is You", describing it as "exquisite". He continued to write that it is "a sweeping big-band ballad that you'd swear was a cover from some Judy Garland movie you didn't pay that much attention to once. Not even Santa himself has the power to conjure the spontaneous nostalgia found here." BBC critic Mike Diver was complimentary of the track, writing that, although the effect is "less instant" compared to the first single, "Oh Santa!", it fits in well with the rest of the album and is "perfectly formed". Caryn Ganz of Rolling Stone simply described the orchestration of the original compositions "One Child" and "Christmas Time Is in the Air Again" as overwhelmingly Christmasy". In her 2012 single review of the song, Entertainment Focus writer Pip Ellwood awarded "Christmas Time Is in the Air Again" four out of a possible five stars. She praised the composition for its "classy, soulful and sumptuous" feel and labelled it as "yet another festive classic from the Queen of Christmas". Ellwood concluded her review by writing that the release of the song two years after that of Merry Christmas II You should "get it some more well-deserved attention".

== Promotion ==
It was confirmed on November 15, 2012, that Carey would be performing at the NBC event Christmas in Rockefeller Centre later that month. The singer performed "All I Want for Christmas Is You" and "Christmas Time Is in the Air Again". Idolator writer Sam Lanksy wrote that she performed with "maestro vocals", but felt that her vocals on the latter rendition "eclipsed" that of the former. Carey also performed both songs when she appeared as a special guest on Michael Bublé's 3rd annual televised Christmas Special, which aired on NBC. The song was included on the set-list of her Beacon Theatre residency called All I Want For Christmas Is You, A Night of Joy & Festivity in December 2014. The New York Times critic Jon Caramanica felt as though Carey was "completely undersinging". Carey released a lyric video for "Christmas Time Is in the Air Again" on December 17, 2012. As Carey's vocals play, the lyrics of the song are intercut with Christmas-themed images.

== Charts ==
Chart (2010–2012)	Peak position
South Korea International (Circle)	13
US Holiday Digital Song Sales (Billboard)	50
