= When Christmas Comes =

Single by Mariah Carey and John Legend

from the album Merry Christmas II You
- Released: November 21, 2011
- Recorded: 2011
- Studio: Guardian Angel; Westlake; Henson; Germano
- Genre: R&B; Soul
- Length: 4:47 (album edit); 4:45 (John Legend duet)
- Label: Island
- Songwriters: Mariah Carey; James Poyser
- Producers: Mariah Carey; James Poyser

Mariah Carey singles chronology
| "Auld Lang Syne (The New Year's Anthem)" (2010) | "When Christmas Comes" (2011) | "All I Want for Christmas Is You (SuperFestive!)" (2011) |

John Legend singles chronology
| "Getting Nowhere" (2011) | "When Christmas Comes" (2011) | "Tonight (Best You Ever Had)" (2012) |

Music video
- "When Christmas Comes" on YouTube

"When Christmas Comes" is a song by American singer-songwriter Mariah Carey from her second Christmas album and thirteenth studio album, Merry Christmas II You (2010). Carey wrote and produced the song in collaboration with James Poyser. A soul song with influences of R&B, the lyrics are about giving the gift of love. In November 2011, Carey re-recorded the song as duet with John Legend, which was later released that month as a standalone single by Island Records. Both versions of the track were a hit in South Korea, with the duet debuting at number one with sales in excess of 80,000 copies. The song's accompanying music video features Carey and Legend hosting a Christmas house party. It has been performed by Carey at her ABC 2010 Christmas special and during her 2014 Beacon Theatre residency All I Want for Christmas Is You, A Night of Joy and Festivity in December 2014.

== Background and composition ==
"When Christmas Comes" was written and produced by Mariah Carey and James Poyser for the former's second Christmas album/thirteenth studio album, Merry Christmas II You (2010). Her vocals were recorded by Brian Garten at Guardian Angel Studios in Bel Air, Westlake Recording Studios and Hensons Studios, both located in Los Angeles, and Germano Studios in New York City. Carey performed her own background vocals along with Melonie Daniels, Sharlotte Gibson and Nicki Richards. The music for the song was recorded by Garten and Kevin Guarnieri; Alex Evans played the drums, while John "Jubu" Smith played the guitar. On November 7, 2011, Carey revealed that she would be releasing "When Christmas Comes" as a duet with John Legend. The duet was released in the United States on November 21 and the United Kingdom on November 28.

It as an R&B and soul song with a "simple groove" that lasts for a duration of four minutes and forty-six seconds. The single release version with Legend lasts for additional second. The instrumental consists of horns, including the trumpet performed by Rick Baptist and Greg Adams, and the trombone by Nick Lane. Other brass instruments include Dan Higgins on the sax and flute. In addition to being a producer, Poyser performs the keyboard. Lyrically, the song is about "giving the gift of love", as Carey and Legend harmonize the lyrics "And me and you gon' have ourselves a holiday/ And we don't need nobody else to celebrate/ And we're gon' kiss our worries and our cares away/ I can't wait/ Because this Christmas time, get together / It's gonna be so nice, better than ever/ And baby you’re the one, special treasure." Prior to the final chorus, the pair freelance the a portion of the lyrics from "Jingle Bells". As noted by Scott Shelter of PopCrush, "listeners are treated to notes from the upper reaches of Mariah’s five-octave range, which she rarely shows off anymore." In an interview for Vevo, Carey stated that she felt that Legend was the "perfect choice" to re-create the song as a duet with, and that his "soulful" creative decisions "took it up several notches".

== Critical reception ==
Mike Diver for BBC was complimentary of "When Christmas Comes", writing although the effect is "less instant" compared to the first single, "Oh Santa!", it fits in well with the rest of the album and is "perfectly formed". The Village Voice writer Rich Juzwiak thought that the use of a full band was a "retread" of the songs Carey recorded for her tenth studio album, The Emancipation of Mimi (2005). Of the duet, Shelter described it as "sultry", awarded it four stars out of a possible five, and labelled it as being superior to the original version with vocals solely by Carey included on the album.

== Commercial performance ==
The original version of "When Christmas Comes" debuted and peaked at number 100 in South Korea, on the chart dated November 14, 2010. The single version with Legend debuted at number one on South Korean Download chart on November 27, 2011, with sales of 81,624. The following week, it fell to number eight with 32,952 copies sold. It sold a further 18,947 and 13,339 copies in its third and fourth weeks, respectively. Despite debuting atop Download chart with 81,624 copies sold, it peaked at number two on the Digital chart. In the United States, the duet debuted at number twenty-five on the Adult R&B Songs chart, and climbed to number seventeen the following week. It dropped one position to number eighteen in its third week, but resurged to a peak of number fifteen the week after on January 7, 2012. "When Christmas Comes" debuted at number seventy on the Hot R&B/Hip-Hop Songs chart, becoming the "Hot Shot Debut" for the week dated December 17, 2011, and the first song from Merry Christmas II You to enter the chart. It is Carey's fifty-third entry overall. The track peaked at number fifty-seven on the Japan Hot 100 in 2012.

== Promotion ==
An accompanying music video directed by Sanaa Hamri for "When Christmas Comes" was filmed at Carey's Los Angeles home and features Carey and Legend throwing a celebratory Christmas house party, which includes a cameo by Nick Cannon. It features footage from the film A Charlie Brown Christmas. On November 15, Carey posted images of the video shoot on her website, one of which shows the two singers sitting at piano. It premiered on December 13, 2011. Carey has performed the track live on her ABC Christmas Special in December 2010, and at her annual Beacon Theatre residency called All I Want for Christmas Is You, A Night of Joy and Festivity every December. Legend joined Carey on stage to perform the track at one of the December 2016 concerts.

== Track listings ==
- Digital download (2010 album version)
1. "When Christmas Comes" – 4:46
- Digital download (2011 single release)
1. "When Christmas Comes" with John Legend – 4:45

== Charts ==
=== Weekly charts ===
==== Original version ====
| Chart (2010) | Peak position |
|---|---|
| South Korea (Circle) | 100 |

==== Duet with John Legend ====
| Chart (2011–2012) | Peak position |
|---|---|
| Belgium (Ultratip Bubbling Under Flanders) | 94 |
| Belgium (Ultratip Bubbling Under Wallonia) | 46 |
| Japan (Japan Hot 100) | 57 |
| South Korea International (Circle) | 2 |
| US Hot R&B/Hip-Hop Songs (Billboard) | 70 |

== Release history ==
| Country | Date | Format | Label |
|---|---|---|---|
| United States | November 21, 2011 | Urban contemporary | Island Records |
| United States | November 21, 2011 | Digital download | Island Records |
| United Kingdom | November 28, 2011 | Digital download | Mercury Records |
