= Oakley Haldeman =

American songwriter

Oakley W. Haldeman (July 17, 1909 – December 17, 1986) was an American songwriter ("Here Comes Santa Claus"), composer, author and the general manager for a music publisher. He joined ASCAP in 1949, and his other popular-song compositions include "Brush Those Tears from Your Eyes", "I Wish I Had Never Met Sunshine", "Tho' I Tried", "Pretty Mary", "Texas Polka", "Honey Child", "Vic'try Train", "Last Mile", and "Texans Never Cry".

Haldeman was born in California, the son of Catherine (Oakley) and Clarence Edward Haldeman.

He was the head of Gene Autry's publishing company, and it was while he was in this position that Autry asked him to write the music for Autry's song Here Comes Santa Claus.
