= One Child (Mariah Carey song) =

2010 song by Mariah Carey

Promotional single by Mariah Carey

from the album Merry Christmas II You
- Recorded: 2010
- Studio: Henson Studios; 20th Century Fox Scoring Stage; Guardian Angel Studios; Germano Studios; Capitol Recording Studios
- Length: 4:25
- Label: Island
- Songwriters: Mariah Carey; Marc Shaiman
- Producers: Carey; Shaiman

Audio
- "One Child" on YouTube

"One Child" is a song by American singer-songwriter Mariah Carey from her second Christmas album/thirteenth studio album, Merry Christmas II You (2010). It was written and produced by Carey in collaboration with Broadway composer Marc Shaiman. Backed by a children's choir, the lyrics are about the birth of Jesus. "One Child" received a mixed to negative response from critics, many of whom disapproved of the overbearing sentiment. In the United States, the track peaked at number 12 on the Billboard Gospel Digital Chart, and on the lower regions of the South Korea international single's charts. Carey performed the song at the Christmas in Washington event in November 2010.

== Background and composition ==
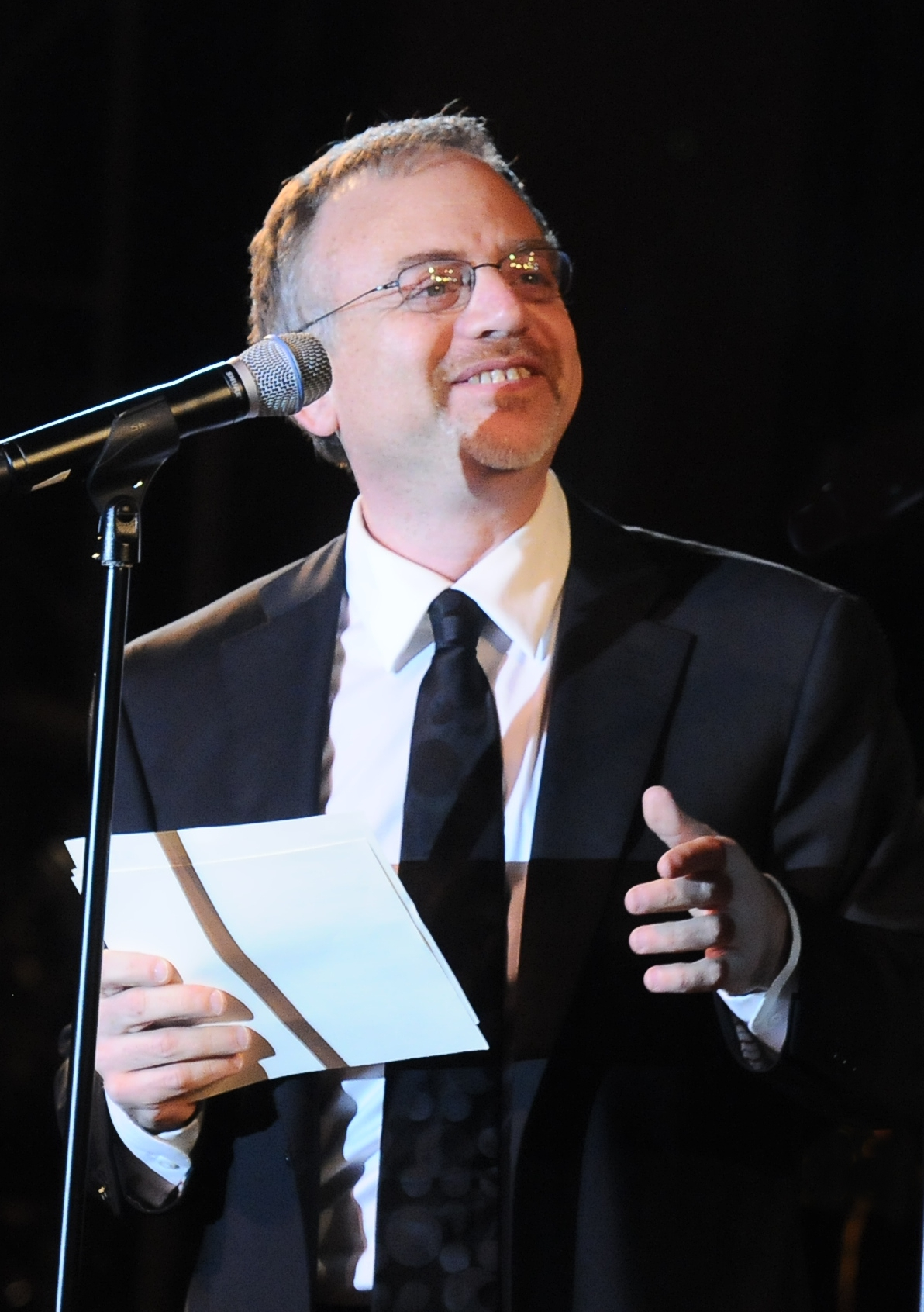
Carey wrote and produced "One Child" with Broadway composer Marc Shaiman.

Carey wrote and produced "One Child" with Broadway composer Marc Shaiman. Lasting for a duration of four minutes and twenty-five seconds, the song is one of two original ballads included on Merry Christmas II You. It encompasses a range of genres, including Christmas, adult contemporary, urban contemporary and religious music.

The music and Carey's vocals recorded by Brian Garten at several recording studios, which included Henson Studios and 20th Century Fox Scoring Stage in Los Angeles, Guardian Angel Studios Bel Air, Germano Studios New York City and Capitol Recording Studios in Hollywood. It was mixed by Phil Tan at The Ninja beat Club in Atlanta. Damien Lewis served as his assistant. "One Child" was arranged by Shaiman, and he carried out the orchestration with Brad Dechter. The song, in the key of C major, has a "tenderly" feel and a tempo of 64 beats per minute. The track is backed by a children's chorus, which was recorded by Martin Cooke. Assisted by Kenta Yonesaka, Alex Gulper, Peter Stanislaus, Charlie Paakkari, Tim Lauber, Tom Steel, Greg Dennon and Denis St. Amand. The children who participated in the chorus were Mariah Britt, Joshua Britt, Evyn Johnson, Makiah Johnson, Mason Johnson, Delaney Meyer, Elsie Moon and Cayla Nisperos; their voices span from G_{3} to F♯_{5}. Carey provided her background vocals alongside Melonie Daniels, Sharlotte Gibson, Sherry McGhee and Nicki Richards.

== Critical reception ==
"One Child" garnered a mixed to negative response from critics. Andy Gill for The Independent thought that the children's choir gave the song a "Jackson 5-esque glutinous" feel. A reviewer for Sputnikmusic described the song as a rewrite of "Jesus Born on This Day", written and produced by Carey and Walter Afanasieff for the singer's first Christmas album, Merry Christmas (1994). Mike Diver for BBC wrote that although the song is "bogged down in sentiment", "any unpleasantness in the mouth is soon washed clean by the arrival of that hit", while Caryn Ganz of Rolling Stone simply described the orchestration as "gooey". Jack Foley of IndieLondon echoed Diver's observation about its sentiment, writing that the "more serious songs" on the album such as "One Child", "Oh Come All Ye Faithful" and "Auld Lang Syne" are "stifling" and makes the album an "endurance test". He continued with "Hence, Auld Lang Syne, One Child and Oh Come All Ye Faithful literally make your skin crawl and howling for the nearest slice of Linkin Park to add some musical grit to your life." The Village Voice writer Rich Juzwiak was critical of the song, describing it as a "needless retelling" of the birth of Jesus that does not add anything new or original to the story of his birth.

== Live performances ==
Accompanied by a gospel choir, Carey performed "One Child" and "O Come All Ye Faithful" at the Christmas in Washington event at the National Building Museum in Washington, D.C.. The performance aired on December 17, 2010, on TNT. Wearing a "billowy red dress adorned with a bow," it was noted by Idolator that Carey decided not to perform her "modern yuletide staple" "All I Want for Christmas Is You" or the first single from the album "Oh Santa!" in favor of "subdued and graceful tracks".

== Charts ==
Chart (2011)	Peak position
South Korea International (Circle)	98
US Gospel Digital Songs (Billboard)	12
