= Merry Christmas II You =

Studio album by Mariah Carey
- Released: November 2, 2010
- Recorded: April–September 2010
- Studios: Bel Air (Guardian Angel Studios); Los Angeles (Westlake Studios, Henson Studios, 20th Century Fox Scoring Stage, The Dugout); New York (Capitol Studios, Germano Studios); Atlanta (Southside Studios)
- Genre: Christmas
- Length: 46:53
- Label: Island Def Jam
- Producers: Mariah Carey; Bryan-Michael Cox; Jermaine Dupri; Randy Jackson; James Poyser; Marc Shaiman; James "Big Jim" Wright; Walter Afanasieff; Johnny "Sev" Severin

Mariah Carey chronology
Memoirs of an Imperfect Angel (2009)	Merry Christmas II You (2010)	Me. I Am Mariah... The Elusive Chanteuse (2014)

Singles from Merry Christmas II You
- 1. "Oh Santa!" Released: October 1, 2010; 2. "Auld Lang Syne (The New Year's Anthem)" Released: December 14, 2010; 3. "When Christmas Comes" Released: November 21, 2011

Merry Christmas II You is the thirteenth studio album and second Christmas album by American singer-songwriter Mariah Carey. It was released by Island Def Jam on November 2, 2010. Recording began in April 2010 and continued while Carey became pregnant. She was the executive producer of Merry Christmas II You and worked with various record producers, including Bryan-Michael Cox, Jermaine Dupri, Randy Jackson, James Poyser, Marc Shaiman, James "Big Jim" Wright and Johnny "Sev" Severin of RedOne. The album features Carey's mother Patricia Carey as a guest vocalist on "O Come All Ye Faithful" / "Hallelujah Chorus". The album serves as a sequel to her fourth studio album Merry Christmas (1994). It is composed of original songs and covers, ballads and uptempo tracks, incorporating R&B, soul, and house music in its composition.

The album received mixed reviews from music critics, who complimented its relaxed yet lively and contemporary feel, while others felt it was predictable and too overproduced in places. It debuted at number four on the US Billboard 200 chart, and reached number one on both the Top R&B/Hip-Hop Albums and Top Holiday Albums charts. It was later certified gold by the Recording Industry Association of America (RIAA), denoting shipments exceeding 500,000 copies. Elsewhere, however, the album was a moderate success, reaching the top-ten in South Korea and Taiwan; the top-twenty in Canada and Hong Kong; the top-thirty in Australia, Hungary and Japan; and the top-forty in Sweden. It missed out on the top 100 in the United Kingdom by one position, peaking at number 101 on the albums chart.

The album produced three singles, including the US Adult Contemporary record-breaking song "Oh Santa!". It reached number-one in its second week, the quickest ascent in the history of the chart and the only song to do so. Other singles included "Auld Lang Syne (The New Year's Anthem)", a single release version of "When Christmas Comes" in 2011 with John Legend and the promotional "Christmas Time Is in the Air Again" in 2012. To support the album, Carey made promotional appearances on The Ellen DeGeneres Show and Lopez Tonight, and hosted her own television special called Mariah Carey: Merry Christmas to You.

== Background and production ==
Mariah Carey's twelfth studio album, Memoirs of an Imperfect Angel, was released in 2009. It produced the US Billboard Hot 100 top ten and platinum certified track "Obsessed". However, subsequent single releases failed to replicate its success, with "I Want to Know What Love Is" peaking at number 60 on the Hot 100, and "H.A.T.E.U." reaching number 72 on the Hot R&B/Hip-Hop Songs chart. Carey revealed that she intended to re-release Memoirs of an Imperfect Angel as a remix album in early 2010, titled Angels Advocate, which would consist of remixes of the standard songs with new featured artists, including Mary J. Blige, Snoop Dogg, Trey Songz, R. Kelly, T-Pain, Gucci Mane and OJ da Juiceman. A release date of February 23, 2010, was slated, and then pushed back to March 9. It was then further pushed back to March 30. "Angels Cry" and "Up Out My Face" from Memoirs of an Imperfect Angel were released as remixes with Ne-Yo featuring on the former and Nicki Minaj on the latter. However, it was confirmed in March 2010 that production of Angels Advocate had been halted and the project was shelved indefinitely. Carey's record label Island Def Jam stated that the singer was instead working on a new project and "new surprises".

In an interview for Rap-Up in April 2010, Jermaine Dupri said that he and Carey had already begun working on new songs, stating "The song of the decade crew is back in the lab. This [is] the first day of the new shit." On April 24, David LaChapelle said that he had shot the album artwork with fake snow and wooden cutout reindeers, thus confirming that the project was a Christmas album. On May 5, Dupri confirmed that he and Carey were in the early stages of production for the album, that Bryan-Michael Cox and Johntá Austin were involved in the project and that they hoped to release a single by the end of the year. On September 1, 2010, Rap-Up exclusively revealed the title of the album, Merry Christmas II You, and that it would be released on November 2 with original songs as well as covers. The II represents being a sequel to Carey's first Christmas album, Merry Christmas (1994).

== Composition ==
The opening track "Santa Claus Is Coming to Town" is a twenty-two second introduction produced by Carey and Shaiman. "Oh Santa!" is an up-tempo R&B song and is one of four new original compositions. It was written and produced by Carey, Dupri and Cox, and its instrumentation consists of sleigh bells, jingle bells, hand claps and a piano melody, backed by a "school-yard chant beat". Lyrically, Carey makes a plea to Santa Claus asking him to bring back her "baby" in time for Christmas, singing "Santa's gon' come and make him mine this Christmas." Joey Guerra of the Houston Chronicle noted that it has a 1960s girl-group swing feel to it. The third track on the album is a medley titled "O Little Town of Bethlehem" / "Little Drummer Boy". Cary Ganz of Rolling Stone described it as a "straightforward and sweet" performance. "Christmas Time Is in the Air Again" is softly sung ballad backed by a string section. The Village Voice writer Rich Juzwiak felt that "Christmas Time Is in the Air Again" was the only song on Merry Christmas II You that matched "the magic" of "All I Want for Christmas Is You", describing it as "exquisite".

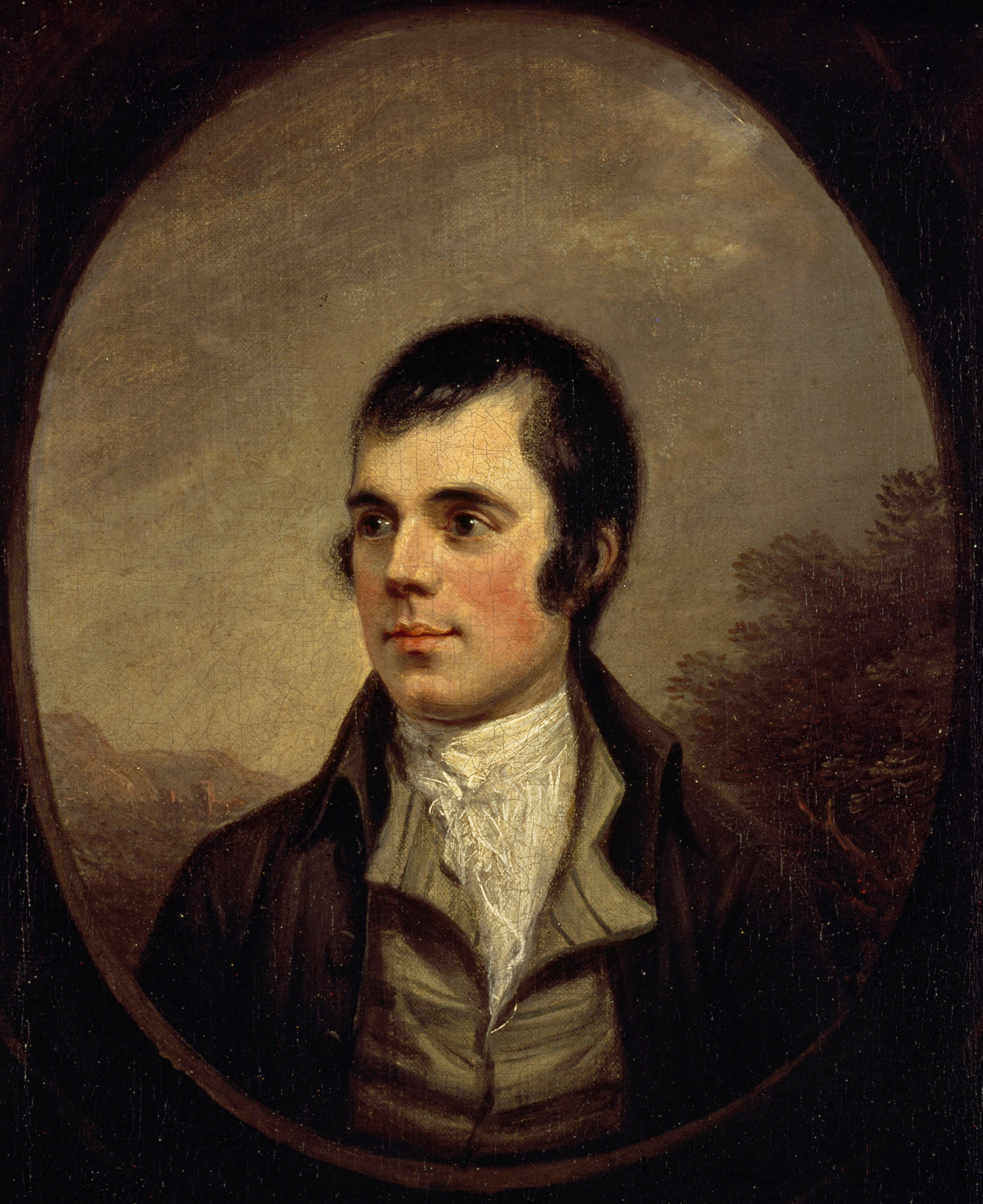
"Auld Lang Syne (The New Year's Anthem)" is a rewrite of "Auld Lang Syne", a Scottish poem by Robert Burns.

Track five is an interlude which is another medley titled "The First Noel" / "Born Is the King". "The First Noel" section is a soulful down-tempo song which consists of Carey delivering a piano-and-voice epilogue backed by an 808 drum machine, while "Born Is the King" is a piece of "pure baby-making magic", according to Juzwiak. "When Christmas Comes" is a soul song with elements of R&B; the instrumental consists of horns, including the trumpet performed by Rick Baptist and Greg Adams, and the trombone by Nick Lane. Other brass instruments include Dan Higgins on the sax and flute. Lyrically, the song is about "giving the gift of love", as Carey sings "And me and you gon' have ourselves a holiday/ And we don't need nobody else to celebrate/ And we're gon' kiss our worries and our cares away/ I can't wait/ Because this Christmas time, get together / It's gonna be so nice, better than ever/ And baby you’re the one, special treasure."

The seventh track on the album comes in the form of another medley, this time called "Here Comes Santa Claus (Right Down Santa Claus Lane)" / "Housetop Celebration". Guerra noted that Carey adds some "club bounce" to "Here Comes Santa Claus (Right Down Santa Claus Lane)", while Eric Henderson of Slant Magazine thought that the "Housetop Celebration" part of the medley "recycles the monolithic beat from Kurtis Blow’s instructive "Christmas Rappin'." "Charlie Brown Christmas" is a variation of the A Charlie Brown Christmas animated musical television special. A piece of nostalgia, as described by Guerra, it also makes use of traditional religious carols. A fourth medley titled "O Come All Ye Faithful" / "Hallelujah Chorus" features Carey's mother, Patricia, who performs opera during the "Hallelujah Chorus" section. According to Bill Lamb of About.com, "Here Mariah Carey is at her best as she threatens to take everything too far sonically with operatic tones, impossibly high notes, and melisma in full force, but somehow it all holds together in exhilarating fashion."

Track ten is a live recording of "O Holy Night" by Carey at the WPC in South Central Los Angeles, which was recorded in 2000 for the song's music video. It makes use of the singer's "deeper, throatier tones" and "octave-scaling high notes". It is followed by "One Child", written by Carey and Marc Shaiman, a retelling of the nativity of Jesus. It encompasses a range of genres, including Christmas, adult contemporary, urban contemporary and religious music. "All I Want for Christmas Is You – Extra Festive" is a re-recording of the original, which makes use of extra chimes, "beefier" production with softened bell rings and an added kick drum and new vocals. The final track is a rewrite of "Auld Lang Syne" by Scottish poet and lyricist Robert Burns, which was written in 1788 and published in James Johnson's Scots Musical Museum in 1796. Produced by Carey, Randy Jackson and Johnny "Sev" Severin of RedOne, they re-titled it "Auld Lang Syne (The New Year's Anthem)". It is a house track with a "thumping" instrumental.

== Singles ==
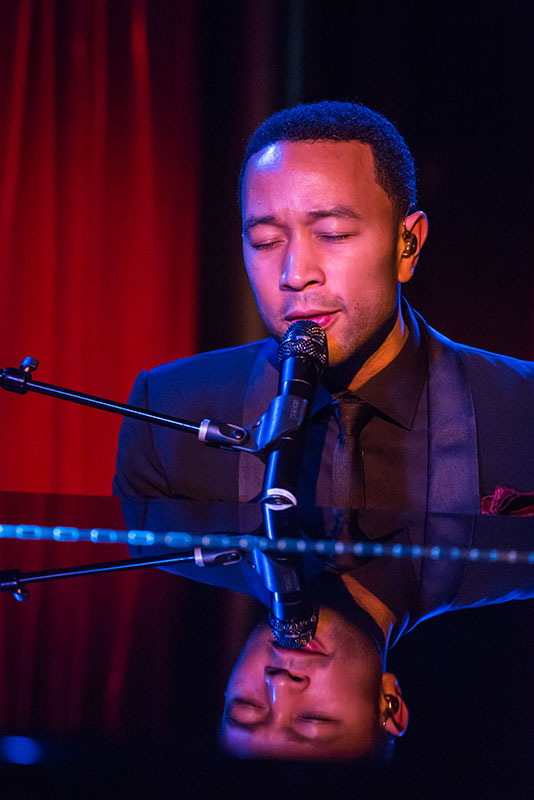
John Legend is featured on the single release version of "When Christmas Comes".

"Oh Santa!" was released as the lead single and premiered on October 1, 2010. It received a positive response from music critics, with many praising its composition and style. It became a record-breaking entry on the Billboard Adult Contemporary songs chart. It debuted at number twelve and rose to number one the following week, becoming the first song to reach the peak in two weeks on the chart. It finished at number forty-two on the 2011 Adult Contemporary year-end chart. It also reached number one on the Holiday Digital Songs chart, and number one-hundred on the Hot 100. "Auld Lang Syne (The New Year's Anthem)" was released as the album's second single with a nine-song remix EP on December 14, 2010. It garnered a negative response from critics, all of whom disapproved of how Carey had re-composed the traditional poem by Burns into a house music song. It peaked at number nine of the US Holiday Songs chart.

In 2011, "When Christmas Comes" was released as the third single as a newly recorded duet with John Legend. The song was sent to Urban contemporary radio and made available for digital download on November 21, 2011. It was released in the United Kingdom on November 28. Scott Shelter of PopCrush thought that the duet was "superior" to the original, and award it four stars out of five. An accompanying music video directed by Sanaa Hamri for "When Christmas Comes" was filmed at Carey's Los Angeles home and features Carey and Legend throwing a celebratory Christmas house party, which includes a cameo by Nick Cannon. It features footage from the film A Charlie Brown Christmas. The duet reached number seventy on US Hot R&B/Hip-Hop Songs chart and number fifteen on the Adult R&B Songs chart. It debuted at number 1 on South Korea International Download Singles chart on November 27, 2011, with sales of 81,624. "Christmas Time Is in the Air Again" was released as a promotional single on December 2, 2012. It was positively received by critics, some of whom compared its high quality to the caliber of "All I Want for Christmas is You". It reached number six on the South Korea International Download Singles chart.

== Release and promotion ==
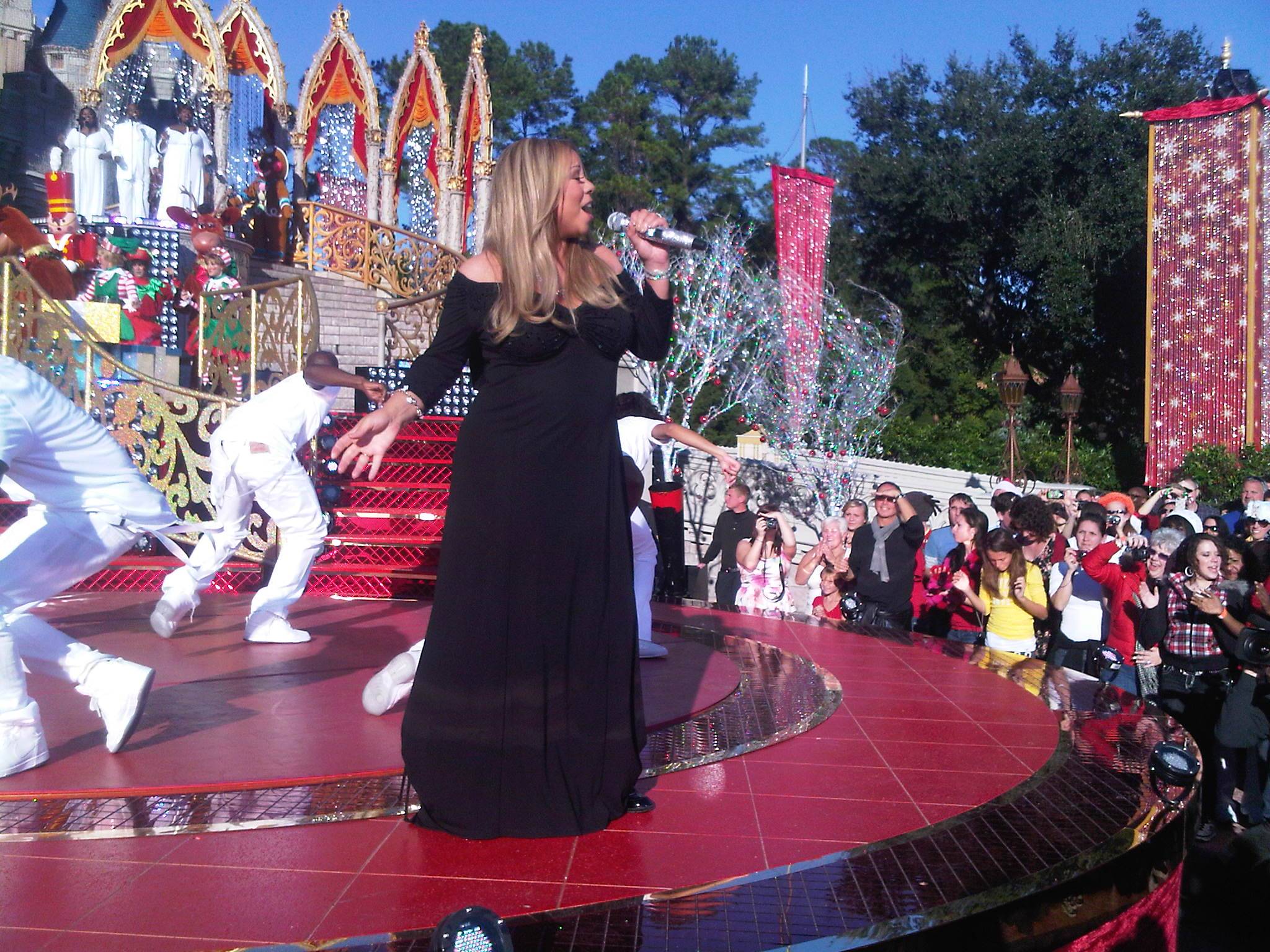
A pregnant Carey performing "All I Want for Christmas Is You – Extra Festive" live at the Walt Disney World Resort in Orlando, Florida on December 3, 2010

On October 20, 2010, Carey appeared on the Home Shopping Network (HSN) where she was interviewed about the album and previewed six tracks, including "The First Noel" / "Born Is the King", "O Little Town of Bethlehem" / "Little Drummer Boy" and "O Come All Ye Faithful" / "Hallelujah Chorus", the last featuring her mother Patricia Carey. Of recording a Christmas album, Carey said "A lot of people look at making a Christmas album like, 'Oh, it's just a throwaway thing and then I'll do my real album'. For me, these are timeless pieces of work that can last year after year after year and so I want to be able to listen to it." On November 2, Carey appeared for an interview on The Ellen DeGeneres Show to discuss the album. Merry Christmas II You was released in Canada and the United States for digital download and as a CD on November 2. A special edition containing a Die Cut Ornament and five holiday cards was released exclusively through Walmart the same day. A collector's edition containing a golden gift box, a forty-page hardcover photo album, a sticker tag sheet and a collectible butterfly ornament was released on November 16 via Amazon.com for $60.31.

The following day, Carey appeared on Lopez Tonight. On November 19, Carey taped a performance of "Oh Santa!" at the NBC Rockefeller Center Christmas Tree Lighting which aired later in the month. On December 3, 2010, Carey performed "Oh Santa!" as well as "All I Want For Christmas Is You" at the Walt Disney World Christmas Day Parade special, which featured Carey surrounded by dancers, including ballerinas and cheerleaders, and ended with fireworks at the end of the performance. A pre-recorded ABC television special called Mariah Carey: Merry Christmas to You aired on December 13. The show included performances of "Oh Santa!" and "O Come All Ye Faithful" accompanied by her mother Patricia, and "All I Want for Christmas Is You". It was filmed at the Orpheum Theatre in Los Angeles on November 6, and executively produced by Carey and Joel Gallen. Accompanied by a gospel choir, Carey performed "One Child" and "O Come All Ye Faithful" at the Christmas in Washington event at the National Building Museum in Washington, D.C.. The performance aired on December 17, 2010, on TNT.

In 2025, for the album's fifteenth anniversary, Def Jam Records and Universal Music Enterprises released an Amazon-exclusive "Shiny Starlight" coloured vinyl of the album.

== Critical reception ==
Professional ratings
Aggregate scores
Source	Rating
Metacritic	60/100
Review scores
Source	Rating
AllMusic	3/5 stars
About.com	4/5 stars
Houston Chronicle	3/4 stars
Rolling Stone	3/5 stars
Slant Magazine	2.5/5 stars

At Metacritic, which assigns a normalized rating out of 100 to reviews from mainstream critics, Merry Christmas II You received an average score of 60, based on eight reviews, which indicates "mixed or average" reviews. About.com writer Bill Lamb praised the album, writing that it has a "relaxed, comfortable" which is "engaging". He wrote that the original compositions were "solid", placing emphasis on "Oh Santa!", "One Child" and "When Christmas Comes", but felt that "Christmas Time Is In the Air Again" was overshadowed by its heavy orchestration. He concluded by writing "Mariah Carey does know her way around Christmas albums." Joey Guerra of the Houston Chronicle echoed Lamb's sentiments, adding that the album ought to boost Carey's career. He was complimentary of its overall feel, writing that manages to capture the "same magic" as her previous Christmas album, Merry Christmas, and that the original songs fit "snugly" with the Christmas classics. He finished his review with "There's enough sweet spirit here to keep the holidays merry, musical and bright."

Stephen Thomas Erlewine of AllMusic noted that the four new original compositions gave it "a lively modern feel," and highlighted "Oh Santa!" and "When Christmas Comes" as examples. He continued to write that although some covers, such as "Auld Lang Syne" and "Charlie Brown Christmas" sound "stiff", the album as a complete body of work is "cheerful and engaging" and is a worthy successor to Carey's previous Christmas album. BBC Music's Mike Diver thought that although the album is not necessarily "clever", it is "expectedly big", and that while "Oh Santa!" is not in the "same league" as "All I Want for Christmas Is You", it's a perfect stocking filler.

Rolling Stone writer Caryn Ganz disliked the two original ballads, "Christmas Time Is In the Air Again" and "One Child", describing them "both thick with gooey orchestration", but praised "Oh Santa!" and "When Christmas Comes" for their uptempo melodies. However, she was confused by the re-recording of "All I Want for Christmas Is You", saying that "It's hard to figure out what's 'extra festive'", and quipped that it is "far easier to determine what's wrong with 'Auld Lang Syne' (an awkward dance beat)". Ganz concluded with "the LP's warm heart is in the right place." Eric Henderson of Slant Magazine gave the album two and a half stars out of five, writing "Everything about Carey’s sequel to 1994’s buoyant, if, in retrospect, safe, Merry Christmas is as desperate and habitual as it is reassuringly predictable." While he continued to label it as an "incredibly adventureless album," he also wrote that it is a "remarkably comforting listen". He felt that Merry Christmas II You was not a sequel, or a remake, but rather an attempt at rewinding time on Carey's part. Rich Juzwiak of The Village Voice was critical of Merry Christmas II You. He described "One Child" as a "needless retelling", and "Oh Santa!" as trying too hard, and too difficult to sing along to.

== Commercial performance ==
In the United States, Merry Christmas II You debuted at number four on the Billboard 200 album chart, with first week sales of 55,000 copies. It became her sixteenth top ten album, and placed her third amongst women for the most top ten entries, after Madonna with nineteen and Barbra Streisand with thirty. It also peaked at number one on both the Top R&B/Hip-Hop Albums chart and the Top Holiday Albums chart (her second to do so on the latter, following Merry Christmas in 1994). The album also peaked at number seven on the Digital Albums chart. It was certified Gold denoting shipments exceeding 500,000 copies by the Recording Industry Association of America (RIAA) on January 11, 2011. As of November 2018, it has sold 587,000 copies in the United States. In Canada, the album peaked at number fourteen. Outside of the United States, the album failed to achieve similar success. It reached the top thirty in Australia and Hungary, peaking at number twenty-seven and number thirty, respectively. It peaked at number forty-one in Italy, and number forty-five in Austria. It peaked at number 101 on the UK Albums Chart on November 27, 2010. The album performed better in South Korea, debuting at number four, becoming Carey's first top-ten album in the country.

== Track listing ==
Merry Christmas II You track listing
No.	Title	Writer(s)	Producer(s)	Length
1.	"Santa Claus Is Coming to Town" (Intro)	Haven Gillespie; John Frederick Coots	Mariah Carey; Marc Shaiman	0:22
2.	"Oh Santa!"	Carey; Jermaine Dupri; Bryan-Michael Cox	Carey; Dupri; Cox	3:31
3.	"O Little Town of Bethlehem" / "Little Drummer Boy" (Medley)	Phillips Brooks; Lewis H. Redner; Katherine Davis; Henry Onorati; Harry Simeone	Carey; James "Big Jim" Wright; Randy Jackson	3:32
4.	"Christmas Time Is in the Air Again"	Carey; Marc Shaiman	Carey; Shaiman	3:01
5.	"The First Noel" / "Born Is the King" (Interlude)	Traditional	Carey; Wright; Jackson	4:32
6.	"When Christmas Comes"	Carey; James Poyser	Carey; Poyser	4:46
7.	"Here Comes Santa Claus (Right Down Santa Claus Lane)" / "Housetop Celebration"	Gene Autry; Oakley Haldeman; Benjamin Hanby	Carey; Dupri; Cox	3:28
8.	"Charlie Brown Christmas"	Vince Guaraldi; Lee Mendelson	Carey; Wright; Jackson	2:49
9.	"O Come All Ye Faithful" / "Hallelujah Chorus" (featuring Patricia Carey)	George Frideric Handel	Carey; Wright; Jackson	3:38
10.	"O Holy Night" (Live from WPC in South Central Los Angeles)	Adolphe Adam		5:00
11.	"One Child"	Carey; Shaiman	Carey; Shaiman	4:25
12.	"All I Want for Christmas Is You – Extra Festive"	Carey; Afanasieff	Carey; Wright; Jackson	4:02
13.	"Auld Lang Syne (The New Year's Anthem)"	Robert Burns; Carey; Jackson; Johnny "Sev" Severin	Carey; Jackson; Severin	3:47
Total length:				46:53

Notes

- "Charlie Brown Christmas" contains elements from "Linus and Lucy" and "Christmas Time Is Here".

== Charts ==
=== Weekly charts ===
Chart (2010)	Peak position
Australian Albums (ARIA)	27
Austrian Albums (Ö3 Austria)	45
Belgian Albums (Ultratop Flanders)	87
Belgian Albums (Ultratop Wallonia)	85
Canadian Albums (Billboard)	14
Croatian Albums (HDU)	21
Dutch Albums (Album Top 100)	52
French Albums (SNEP)	82
German Albums (Offizielle Top 100)	77
Greek Albums (IFPI)	22
Hungarian Albums (MAHASZ)	30
Italian Albums (FIMI)	41
Japanese Albums (Oricon)	24
South Korean Albums (Circle)	4
Spanish Albums (PROMUSICAE)	56
Swedish Albums (Sverigetopplistan)	40
UK Albums (OCC)	101
UK R&B Albums (OCC)	12
US Billboard 200	4
US Top Holiday Albums (Billboard)	1
US Top R&B/Hip-Hop Albums (Billboard)	1

=== Year-end charts ===
Chart (2010)	Position
South Korean International Albums (Gaon)	3
Chart (2011)	Position
US Billboard 200	84
US Top R&B/Hip-Hop Albums (Billboard)	23

== Certifications and sales ==
Region	Certification	Certified units/sales
United States (RIAA)	Gold	587,000

== See also ==
- List of Billboard number-one R&B albums of 2010
