= Fall in Love at Christmas =

2021 single by Mariah Carey, Khalid and Kirk Franklin

Single by Mariah Carey, Khalid and Kirk Franklin
- Released: November 5, 2021
- Recorded: 2021
- Studio: The Butterfly Lounge (Atlanta, GA); DK's Studio (Burbank, CA); Uncle Jessie's Kitchen (Arlington, TX)
- Genre: Christmas; R&B
- Length: 5:08
- Label: Mariah Carey; RCA Inspiration; Sony
- Songwriters: Mariah Carey; Kirk Franklin; Daniel Moore II
- Producers: Mariah Carey; Kirk Franklin; Daniel Moore II

Mariah Carey singles chronology
| "Somewhat Loved" (2021) | "Fall in Love at Christmas" (2021) | "Big Energy" (remix) (2022) |

Khalid singles chronology
| "Present" (2021) | "Fall in Love at Christmas" (2021) | "Last Call" (2022) |

Kirk Franklin singles chronology
| "We Win" (2021) | "Fall in Love at Christmas" (2021) |

Music video
- "Fall in Love at Christmas" on YouTube

"Fall in Love at Christmas" is a holiday song by American singers Mariah Carey, Khalid, and Kirk Franklin. It was released on November 5, 2021, and was written and produced by Carey, Franklin, and Daniel Moore II. The song was featured on Carey's second Christmas special for Apple TV+, titled Mariah's Christmas: The Magic Continues, which was released worldwide on December 3, 2021.

== Background and release ==
On October 31, 2021, Carey shared via social media a clip teasing the release of a song. On November 1, Carey officially announced the song, which was scheduled for release on November 5, through a 30-second preview, revealing the song to be a romantic R&B-tinged ballad, with Carey and Khalid singing together in the chorus and a gospel inspired choir led by Kirk Franklin. The official artwork includes photos of the three artists as children against Christmas wrapping paper.

The song was performed on Carey's second Christmas special for Apple TV+, titled Mariah's Christmas: The Magic Continues, which was released worldwide on December 3, 2021.

== Critical reception ==
Upon release, the song received generally positive reviews. Vulture writer Rebecca Alter called the song an "extremely smooth duet with Khalid" praising their harmonizing. She went on to praise Franklin as a choirmaster noting that he "brings the gospel choir in and kicks things up a notch". The New York Post writer Brooke Kato also noted that "the new holiday tune was met with support and joy online as listeners flocked to listen right as the clock struck midnight".

NPR writer Lars Gotrich also gave the song high praise stating that the song "is a carol for grown folks several seasons into their love and the kind of sumptuous torch song that Carey hasn't sung in a minute". Gotrich also praised Khalid's vocals stating that "the 23-year-old R&B singer knows no one can outdo Carey, so his harmonies add just the right amount of tinsel". Metro writer Emma Kelly praised Carey's vocal but gave mixed reviews to the Christmas element of the song noting that the song is "just a well-crafted R’n’B slow jam with Christmas keywords shoehorned in". She went on to say that, "Mariah sounds as incredible as ever, with her trademark whistle tone still sending chills down our spines when she whips it out towards the song's crescendo, and Khalid's soulful tone compliments her perfectly".

== Music video ==
A music video for the song was filmed at Carey's house and released on her Vevo channel on November 5. Throughout the video, Carey "spreads the cheer with Khalid and gospel great Kirk Franklin in the clip that finds the three hanging in their PJs in Mariah's living room as they croon over the track's finger-picked guitars and subtly chiming sleigh bells". The video was directed by Carey and her boyfriend Bryan Tanaka.

== Formats and track listings ==
CD single

1. "Fall in Love at Christmas" (Main Version) – 5:08
2. "Fall in Love at Christmas" (Radio Edit) – 3:38
3. "Fall in Love at Christmas" (Radio Edit with Outro) – 4:15

Fall in Love at Christmas (Remixes)

1. "Fall in Love at Christmas" (Arlo Remix) – 3:41
2. "Fall in Love at Christmas" (Cutmore Remix) – 4:59
3. "Fall in Love at Christmas" (Moto Blanco Remix) – 6:32

12-inch vinyl

A1. "Fall in Love at Christmas" (Main Version) – 5:08
A2. "Fall in Love at Christmas" (Extended Radio Version) – 4:15
A3. "Fall in Love at Christmas" (Radio Version) – 3:38
B1. "Fall in Love at Christmas" (Arlo Remix) – 3:41
B2. "Fall in Love at Christmas" (Cutmore Remix) – 4:49
B3. "Fall in Love at Christmas" (Moto Blanco Remix) – 6:32

== Charts ==
Weekly chart performance for "Fall in Love at Christmas"
| Chart (2021–2023) | Peak position |
|---|---|
| Hungary (Single Top 40) | 19 |
| Japan Hot Overseas (Billboard Japan) | 9 |
| Netherlands (Single Top 100) | 97 |
| UK Singles Downloads (Official Charts) | 57 |
| US Digital Song Sales (Billboard) | 24 |
| US Hot R&B Songs (Billboard) | 24 |
| US R&B/Hip-Hop Airplay (Billboard) | 45 |
| US Adult Contemporary (Billboard) | 31 |

== Release history ==
Release history for "Fall in Love at Christmas"
| Region | Date | Format | Label | Ref. |
|---|---|---|---|---|
| Various | November 5, 2021 | Digital download; streaming | RCA Inspiration; Sony Music | |
| Various | November 5, 2021 | CD single | RCA Inspiration; Sony Music | |
| United States | November 26, 2021 | Urban adult contemporary radio | RCA Inspiration; Sony Music | |
