= Here Comes Santa Claus =

1947 song by Oakley Haldeman and Gene Autry

"Here Comes Santa Claus (Right Down Santa Claus Lane)"

Single by Gene Autry
- B-side: "An Old Fashioned Tree"
- Published: November 20, 1947 by Gene Autry Music Publishing, Inc.
- Released: October 6, 1947
- Recorded: August 28, 1947
- Genre: Christmas
- Length: 2:34
- Label: Columbia 37942
- Songwriters: Gene Autry, Harriet Melka, and Oakley Haldeman

"Here Comes Santa Claus (Right Down Santa Claus Lane)" is a popular Christmas song originally performed by Gene Autry, with music composed by Autry, Oakley Haldeman and Harriet Melka. Autry's original recording (in which he pronounces Santa Claus as "Santy Claus") was a top-10 hit on the pop and country charts; the song would go on to be covered many times in the subsequent decades.

== History ==
Autry got the idea for the song after riding his horse in the 1946 Santa Claus Lane Parade (now the Hollywood Christmas Parade) in Los Angeles, during which crowds of spectators chanted, "Here comes Santa Claus". Autry's lyrics combined two veins of the Christmas tradition, the mythology of Santa Claus and the Christian origin of the holiday (most explicitly in its mention of the nativity promise of "peace on Earth" to those who "follow the light"). A demo recording was made by singer/guitarist Johnny Bond, whose recording made use of ice cubes to mimic the sound of jingling sleigh bells. This inspired the use of real sleigh bells in Autry's own recording of the song.

Autry first recorded the song on August 28, 1947; released as a single by Columbia Records, It became a No. 5 country and No. 9 pop hit. Autry performed the song in his 1949 movie The Cowboy and the Indians. He re-recorded it again in 1953 for Columbia, and once more in 1957 for his own Challenge Records label, which released it on more than one album that year.

Other artists to record the song include Doris Day (1949), Bing Crosby and the Andrews Sisters (recorded May 10, 1949), Elvis Presley (1957), the Ray Conniff Singers (1959), Keely Smith (1960), David Seville and His Chipmunks (1961), Bob B. Soxx & the Blue Jeans (1963), Hank Thompson (1964), in excerpt by The Beach Boys as part of their song "Child of Winter" (1974), Willie Nelson (1979), Glen Campbell, RuPaul, The Wiggles (1997), Billy Idol (2006), Bob Dylan (2009), Mariah Carey (2010), Chicago (2011), the Glee cast (2013), Anna Kendrick (2015), Pentatonix (2018), and Seth MacFarlane and Elizabeth Gillies (2023). In 1988, "Here Comes Santa Claus" was featured in Very Merry Christmas Songs which is part of the Disney Sing Along Songs collection. The song was also featured prominently in the popular 1989 Christmas movie National Lampoon's Christmas Vacation during the climax towards the end of the film. The version of the song used was Autry's 1957 Challenge Records recording.

== Chart performance ==
=== Gene Autry version ===
1948 weekly chart performance for "Here Comes Santa Claus"
Chart (1948)	Peak position
US Billboard Hot Country Singles	5
US Billboard Best Sellers in Stores	9

2018–2026 weekly chart performance for "Here Comes Santa Claus"
Chart (2018–2026)	Peak position
Canada Hot 100 (Billboard)	35
Global 200 (Billboard)	42
Greece International Streaming (IFPI)	88
Ireland (IRMA)	77
Latvia Streaming (DigiTop100)	85
Lithuania (AGATA)	100
Netherlands (Single Top 100)	94
Portugal (AFP)	181
Switzerland (Schweizer Hitparade)	63
UK Singles (Official Charts)	89
US Billboard Hot 100	21
US Rolling Stone Top 100	22

=== Elvis Presley version ===
2022–2023 weekly chart performance for "Here Comes Santa Claus" by Elvis Presley
Chart (2022–2024)	Peak position
Global 200 (Billboard)	104
Netherlands (Single Top 100)	67
UK Streaming Chart (OCC)	86

=== Frank Sinatra version ===
2023 weekly chart performance for "Here Comes Santa Claus" by Frank Sinatra
Chart (2023)	Peak position
Sweden (Sverigetopplistan)	89

=== Doris Day version ===
==== Decade-end charts ====
20s Decade-end chart performance
Chart (2025–2026)	Position
Russia Streaming (TopHit)	152

== Certifications ==
=== Elvis Presley version ===
Region	Certification	Certified units/sales
United Kingdom (BPI)	Silver	200,000^{‡}
^{‡} Sales+streaming figures based on certification alone.

=== Gene Autry version ===
Region	Certification	Certified units/sales
United Kingdom (BPI)	Silver	200,000^{‡}
^{‡} Sales+streaming figures based on certification alone.
