= Oh Santa! =

2010 single by Mariah Carey

Single by Mariah Carey

from the album Merry Christmas II You
- Released: October 1, 2010
- Recorded: 2010
- Studio: Guardian Angel Studios; Westlake Recording Studios; Hensons Studios; Capitol Recording Studios
- Genre: Christmas; R&B
- Length: 3:31
- Label: Island Def Jam; Epic
- Songwriters: Mariah Carey; Jermaine Dupri; Bryan-Michael Cox
- Producers: Carey; Cox; Dupri

Mariah Carey singles chronology
"Angels Cry" (2010)	"Oh Santa!" (2010)	"Auld Lang Syne (The New Year's Anthem)" (2010)

Music video
- "Oh Santa!" on YouTube

"Oh Santa!" is a song by American singer-songwriter Mariah Carey from her second Christmas album and thirteenth studio album, Merry Christmas II You (2010). Carey wrote and produced the song in collaboration with Jermaine Dupri and Bryan-Michael Cox. It was released as the lead single from the album on October 1, 2010 by Island Def Jam Records. It is an up-tempo R&B song about Carey making a plea for Santa Claus to bring back her partner in time for the Christmas holidays. It received a positive response from music critics, with many praising its composition and style.

The track set a record on the United States Billboard Adult Contemporary songs chart, debuting at number twelve and peaking at number one the following week for four weeks. It became the first song to reach the summit in two weeks. It further became Carey's seventh number-one song on the chart. Carey filmed a 1960s-style music video to accompany the song's release as a single, and performed it on various programs in the lead up to Christmas, including her own TV special called Mariah Carey: Merry Christmas to You.

It was later adapted to be the finale of A Christmas Melody, a 2015 Hallmark Channel Christmas movie, with its lyrics tweaked to be relevant for Broadway child performer Fina Strazza's character singing about her single mother finding love. On December 4, 2020, a new version was released featuring singers Ariana Grande and Jennifer Hudson, as a single from the soundtrack to Mariah Carey's Magical Christmas Special for Apple TV+.

== Background and composition ==
"Oh Santa!"
A 21 second sample of the song's chorus, featuring jingles and handclaps.

"Oh Santa!" was written and produced by Mariah Carey, Jermaine Dupri and Bryan-Michael Cox for Carey's second Christmas/thirteenth studio album, Merry Christmas II You (2010); Rye Songs administered by Songs of Universal (BMI)/Shaniah Cymone Music|EMI April Music Inc. (ASCAP)/WBM Music Corp Inc./Pamela & Lorrence's Publishing LLC (SESAC). Her vocals were recorded by Brian Garten, Marcus Johnson and Thomas Kanarek, Martin Cooke, Nicholas Essif and Peter Mack, and the music by John Horesco at Guardian Angel Studios, Westlake Recording Studios, Henson Studios and Capitol Recording Studios. It was mixed by Phil Tan and Damien Lewis at The Ninja Beat Club. Dupri played the drums and Randy Jackson performed bass. Cox plated the keyboard and percussion. The background vocals were sung by Angie Fisher, Melonie Daniels, Maryann Tatum, Sharlotte Gibson and Toni Scruggs.

"Oh Santa!" was one of four original compositions by Carey to be included on the album. It premiered on October 1, 2010, in the United States. An EP consisting of six remixes by Jump Smokers and Low Sunday were released on December 7, while a mix of "Oh Santa! and one of Carey's previous Christmas songs "All I Want for Christmas Is You", titled "Oh Santa! All I Want for Christmas Is You (Holiday Mashup)", was released on December 17. "Oh Santa!" is an up-tempo and festive R&B song, which lasts for a duration of three minutes, thirty-one seconds. It has a 1960s girl-group swing feel. The song, in the key of C♯ major, has a tempo of 80 beats per minute. Carey's voice spans more than three octaves, from B♭_{2} to the high note of F♯_{6}. Instrumentation consists of sleigh bells, jingle bells, hand claps and a piano melody, backed by a "school-yard chant beat". Lyrically, Carey makes a plea to Santa Claus asking him to bring back her "baby" in time for Christmas, singing "Santa's gon' come and make him mine this Christmas."

== Critical reception ==
Mike Diver of the BBC wrote that "Oh Santa!" is a "boisterous" song which "makes perfect sense" as a lead single. He continued to write that although it fell substandard to "All I Want for Christmas Is You", it would still "warrant revisiting 12 months down the line". Rolling Stone writer Caryn Ganz commented on the composition, writing "Mariah bops to a schoolyard-chant beat". Joey Guerra of the Houston Chronicle described the song as "irresistible" and predicted that it would "dominate ringtones" in the run up to Christmas. A reviewer for Idolator described the track as a "boppy" Christmas version of Avril Lavigne's "Girlfriend". Rich Juzwiak of The Village Voice was critical of the song, writing "Of the four Mariah-penned new tracks, the Jermaine Dupri/Bryan-Michael Cox collaboration 'Oh Santa!' tries the hardest, an antique kitchen-sink replica that manages to invoke a cheerleading squad, the Pointer Sisters, Mariah's own 'Loverboy', and Hey Ya!'. Full of mumbling and cattiness, it's difficult to sing along to, so its prospects of becoming a perennial favorite are dim."

== Chart performance ==
In the United States, "Oh Santa!" became a record-breaking entry on the Billboard Adult Contemporary songs chart. It debuted at number twelve for the issue dated December 11, 2010. The track soared to number one the following week, marking the quickest ascent to the peak position since Nielsen BDS began tracking airplay in 1993, in just two weeks. Previously, eight songs had reached number one within three weeks, four of which were Christmas entries due to adult contemporary radio stations playing an increased amount in the holiday season. "Oh Santa!" became Carey's seventh number-one hit on the chart, and her first in fifteen years since "One Sweet Day" (1995–96), a duet with Boyz II Men. The singer also topped the chart with her debut single "Vision of Love" (her first) and "Love Takes Time" in 1990, "I Don't Wanna Cry" in 1991, and "Can't Let Go" and "I'll Be There" in 1992. "Oh Santa!" remained atop the chart for four consecutive weeks altogether. It finished at number 42 on the 2011 Adult Contemporary year-end chart. For the week ending October 30, 2010, Carey occupied the top two positions on the Holiday Digital Songs chart: "Oh Santa!" debuted at number one while "All I Want For Christmas Is You" charted at number two. On January 1, 2011, the track debuted at number one-hundred on the Billboard Hot 100 chart, and number forty on the Hot R&B/Hip-Hop Digital Songs chart.

Elsewhere, the track debuted at number thirty-six on the South Korean Gaon International Digital Singles Chart for the week ending November 20, 2010. It later peaked at number thirty-two for the week ending December 25, 2010. On the International Download Singles Chart, the track peaked at number thirty. "On Santa!" peaked at number sixty-eight on the Japan Hot 100. The song peaked at number seventy-three on January 1, 2011, for two consecutive weeks on the Canadian Hot 100 chart.

== Music video ==
Carey portrayed as a performer on the fictional Christmas television show in the music video

The music video for "Oh Santa!" was directed by Ethan Lader and was shot in Los Angeles on October 6, 2010. Reports surfaced online that Carey's then-husband Nick Cannon would be directing the video, however Cannon dispelled the rumors on Twitter, saying "I am NOT directing." The video for "Oh Santa!" premiered on entertainment news program Access Hollywood on November 2, 2010. Prior to its release, various media outlets speculated that the video was going incorporate the same on-set style as seen in Outkast's music video for their 2003 single "Hey Ya!", with the singer as the main feature in front of a large audience. Carey's fan site MariahDaily posted a message on their website asking people within the Los Angeles area to appear for a casting call for a chance to be featured in the video.

=== Synopsis ===
The video draws influence from the 1950s and 1960s variety shows and features Carey wearing a short, red "sexy Santa" ensemble, whilst on stage with a band, which featured gospel backup singers as well as a group of dancers, consisting of cheerleaders. The plotline is centered on Carey hosting a "Mariah Carey Christmas" television show. The announcer introduces Carey saying "here she is, the greatest singer of all time, Ms. Mariah Carey!". The video then shows Carey's backup singers belting out the chorus while the singer is seen performing in front of a cheering audience. Her collection of fragrances is also advertised in the opening. In the second half of the video, Santa Claus makes an appearance, waving to friends and sharing a hug with Carey. The video ends with the singer laughing while the audience cheers and claps for her performance.

=== Reception ===
Becky Bain of Idolator commented on the simple structure and themes of the video, writing "There’s not much to this simple vid, but it does feature Carey doing her usual hand-waving theatrics while hitting some absolutely killer high notes." Bain also observed that the vast majority of the shots of Carey are either long shots, showing the singer from a distance, or close-up shots, showing Carey from the shoulders and above so that the viewer was not able to easily recognize that she was pregnant. Nicole James of MTV Buzzworthy also praised the content of the video, writing "Of course, it wouldn't be a Mariah Carey video without some glitz and glam so the stage and backdrop are covered in (what else?) glitter. Mariah puts on a great show and sings her heart out with that famous eight-octave range ... scrooges need not apply, 'Oh Santa!' is fun and festive and has you longing for a sip of eggnog."

== Track listings and formats ==
- Album version
1. " Oh Santa!" – 3:31
- Mashup digital download
1. "Oh Santa! All I Want for Christmas Is You (Holiday Mashup)"
- Oh Santa! (The Remixes) EP
1. "Oh Santa!" (Jump Smokers Edit) – 3:53
2. "Oh Santa!" (Low Sunday Edit) – 4:09
3. "Oh Santa!" (Jump Smokers Extended) – 4:08
4. "Oh Santa!" (Low Sunday Club) – 6:16
5. "Oh Santa!" (Jump Smokers Instrumental) – 3:52
6. "Oh Santa!" (Low Sunday Instrumental) – 6:18

== Charts ==
=== Weekly charts ===
Chart (2010–2020)	Peak position
Belgium (Ultratip Bubbling Under Wallonia)	30
Canada Hot 100 (Billboard)	73
Canada AC (Billboard)	1
Hungary (Single Top 40)	24
Japan (Japan Hot 100)	26
South Korea International (Circle)	32
US Billboard Hot 100	100
US Adult Contemporary (Billboard)	1
US Dance Singles Sales (Billboard)	4
US Holiday Digital Songs (Billboard)	1
US Hot R&B/Hip-Hop Singles Sales (Billboard)	3
US R&B/Hip-Hop Digital Songs (Billboard)	40

=== Year-end charts ===
Chart (2011)	Position
US Adult Contemporary (Billboard)	42

== Mariah Carey, Ariana Grande and Jennifer Hudson version ==
"Oh Santa!"

Single by Mariah Carey featuring Ariana Grande and Jennifer Hudson

from the album Mariah Carey's Magical Christmas Special (Apple TV+ Original Soundtrack)
- Released: December 4, 2020
- Recorded: 2020
- Genre: Christmas
- Length: 3:20
- Label: Sony; Legacy
- Songwriters: Mariah Carey; Jermaine Dupri; Bryan-Michael Cox
- Producers: Mariah Carey; Daniel Moore II; Marc Shaiman; Scott M. Riesett; Tremaine "Six7" Williams

Mariah Carey singles chronology
"Out Here on My Own" (2020)	"Oh Santa!" (2020)	"Where I Belong" (2021)

Ariana Grande singles chronology
"34+35" (2020)	"Oh Santa!" (2020)	"34+35" (remix) (2021)

Jennifer Hudson singles chronology
"I'll Fight" (2018)	"Oh Santa!" (2020)	"Ain't No Mountain High Enough" (2021)

Music video
- "Oh Santa!" on YouTube

For the tenth anniversary of the song, Carey re-recorded and re-released the song commercially as a new remix. Carey recorded the new version of the song with Ariana Grande and Jennifer Hudson. The new version served as the lead single from Carey's second soundtrack album, Mariah Carey's Magical Christmas Special. The song was released across all streaming platforms on December 4, 2020, accompanied by its official music video, premiered the same day on Carey's YouTube account.

=== Background ===
Talking to Billboard, Carey stated in regards to the song that "originally, I was blending with myself [...] but it was cool to be able to work with the different vocal textures and play around with it and reimagine it." She went on to describe the song as a "girl group moment".

=== Reception ===
The remix received positive reviews on release. Billboard writer Rania Aniftos wrote that the three singers "trading verses and harmonies" amounts for a "truly angelic result". Chris Murphy, writer for Vulture went on to say that "the trio, the remix, and the accompanying music video absolutely makes the nice list in every possible way."

In its first week of release, the song sold 10,000 downloads in the United States and 9,250 equivalent units in the United Kingdom.

=== Charts ===
Chart (2020–2024)	Peak position
Canada Hot 100 (Billboard)	60
Canada AC (Billboard)	47
Canada CHR/Top 40 (Billboard)	44
Canada Hot AC (Billboard)	49
Croatia (HRT)	25
Euro Digital Song Sales (Billboard)	7
Germany (GfK)	53
Global 200 (Billboard)	66
Ireland (IRMA)	70
Japan Hot Overseas (Billboard Japan)	8
Latvia (EHR)	39
Netherlands (Dutch Top 40 Tipparade)	18
Netherlands (Single Tip)	1
Nicaragua Anglo (Monitor Latino)	10
North Macedonia (Radiomonitor)	5
Portugal (AFP)	76
South Korea (Circle)	99
Sweden (Sverigetopplistan)	64
Switzerland (Schweizer Hitparade)	74
UK Singles (Official Charts)	50
US Billboard Hot 100	76
US Adult Contemporary (Billboard)	13
US Pop Airplay (Billboard)	43
US Holiday 100 (Billboard)	45
US Hot R&B/Hip-Hop Songs (Billboard)	20

=== Release history ===
Release dates and formats for "Oh Santa!"
Region	Date	Format	Label	Ref.
Various	December 4, 2020	Digital download; streaming	Legacy; Sony	

== See also ==
- List of Billboard Adult Contemporary number ones of 2010
- List of Billboard Adult Contemporary number ones of 2011
- List of artists who reached number one on the U.S. Adult Contemporary chart
