= Customer satisfaction =

Provides a leading indicator of consumer purchase intentions and loyalty

Customer satisfaction is a term frequently used in marketing to evaluate customer experience. It is a measure of how products and services supplied by a company meet or surpass customer expectation. Customer satisfaction is defined as "the number of customers, or percentage of total customers, whose reported experience with a firm, its products, or its services (ratings) exceeds specified satisfaction goals". Enhancing customer satisfaction and fostering customer loyalty are pivotal for businesses, given the significant importance of improving the balance between customer attitudes before and after the consumption process.

Expectancy disconfirmation theory is the most widely accepted theoretical framework for explaining customer satisfaction. However, other frameworks, such as equity theory, attribution theory, contrast theory, assimilation theory, and various others, are also used to gain insights into customer satisfaction. However, traditionally applied satisfaction surveys are influence by biases related to social desirability, availability heuristics, memory limitations, respondents' mood while answering questions, as well as affective, unconscious, and dynamic nature of customer experience.

The Marketing Accountability Standards Board endorses the definitions, purposes, and measures that appear in Marketing Metrics as part of its ongoing Common Language in Marketing Project. In a survey of nearly 200 senior marketing managers, 71 percent responded that they found a customer satisfaction metric very useful in managing and monitoring their businesses. Customer satisfaction is viewed as a key performance indicator within business and is often part of a balanced scorecard. In a competitive marketplace where businesses compete for customers, customer satisfaction is seen as a major differentiator and increasingly has become an important element of business strategy.

== Purpose ==
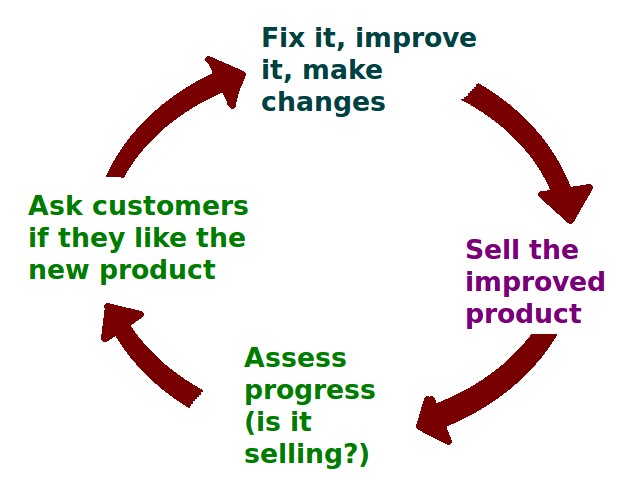
Ideally a business is continually seeking feedback to improve customer satisfaction.

Customer satisfaction operates in relation to both consumer and business usage of goods and services. Farris et al. wrote that "[c]ustomer satisfaction provides a leading indicator of consumer purchase intentions and loyalty". The authors also wrote that "customer satisfaction data are among the most frequently collected indicators of market perceptions. Their principal use is twofold:"

1. "Within organizations, the collection, analysis and dissemination of these data send a message about the importance of tending to customers and ensuring that they have a positive experience with the company's goods and services."
2. "Although sales or market share can indicate how well a firm is performing currently, satisfaction is perhaps the best indicator of how likely it is that the firm's customers will make further purchases in the future. Much research has focused on the relationship between customer satisfaction and retention. Studies indicate that the ramifications of satisfaction are most strongly realized at the extremes."

On a five-point scale, "individuals who rate their satisfaction level as '5' are likely to become return customers and might even evangelize for the firm. A second important metric related to satisfaction is willingness to recommend. This metric is defined as "[t]he percentage of surveyed customers who indicate that they would recommend a brand to friends". A previous study about customer satisfaction stated that when a customer is satisfied with a product, he or she might recommend it to friends, relatives and colleagues. This can be a powerful marketing advantage. According to Farris et al., "[i]ndividuals who rate their satisfaction level as '1,' by contrast, are unlikely to return. Further, they can hurt the firm by making negative comments about it to prospective customers. Willingness to recommend is a key metric relating to customer satisfaction."

In a business context where purchasing decisions involve a number of different individuals with varying objectives and professional backgrounds, Jagdish Sheth noted that varying degrees of satisfaction with previous usage of a product or a supplier are one of the reasons why business decisions can become challenging when a consensus on a purchasing decision is required.

== Theoretical ground ==
In the research literature, the antecedents of customer satisfaction are studied from different perspectives. These perspectives extend from the psychological to the physical as well as from the normative perspective. However, in much of the literature, research has been focused on two basic constructs, (a) expectations prior to purchase or use of a product and (b) customer perception of the performance of that product after using it.

A customer's expectations about a product bear on how the customer thinks the product will perform. Consumers are thought to have various "types" of expectations when forming opinions about a product's anticipated performance. Miller (1977) described four types of expectations: ideal, expected, minimum tolerable, and desirable. Day (1977) underlined different types of expectations, including ones about costs, the nature of the product, benefits, and social value.

It is considered that customers judge products on a limited set of norms and attributes. Olshavsky and Miller (1972) and Olson and Dover (1976) designed their researches as to manipulate actual product performance, and their aim was to find out how perceived performance ratings were influenced by expectations. These studies took out the discussions about explaining the differences between expectations and perceived performance."

In some research studies, scholars have been able to establish that customer satisfaction has a strong emotional, i.e., affective, component. Still others show that the cognitive and affective components of customer satisfaction reciprocally influence each other over time to determine overall satisfaction.

Especially for durable goods that are consumed over time, there is value to taking a dynamic perspective on customer satisfaction. Within a dynamic perspective, customer satisfaction can evolve over time as customers repeatedly use a product or interact with a service. The satisfaction experienced with each interaction (transactional satisfaction) can influence the overall, cumulative satisfaction. Scholars showed that it is not just overall customer satisfaction, but also customer loyalty that evolves over time.

=== The disconfirmation model ===
"The Disconfirmation Model is based on the comparison of customers' [expectations] and their [perceived performance] ratings. Specifically, an individual's expectations are confirmed when a product performs as expected. It is negatively confirmed when a product performs more poorly than expected. The disconfirmation is positive when a product performs over the expectations (Churchill & Suprenant 1982). There are four constructs to describe the traditional disconfirmation paradigm mentioned as expectations, performance, disconfirmation and satisfaction." "Satisfaction is considered as an outcome of purchase and use, resulting from the buyers' comparison of expected rewards and incurred costs of the purchase in relation to the anticipated consequences. In operation, satisfaction is somehow similar to attitude as it can be evaluated as the sum of satisfactions with some features of a product." "In the literature, cognitive and affective models of satisfaction are also developed and considered as alternatives (Pfaff, 1977). Churchill and Suprenant in 1982, evaluated various studies in the literature and formed an overview of Disconfirmation process in the following figure:"

== Construction ==
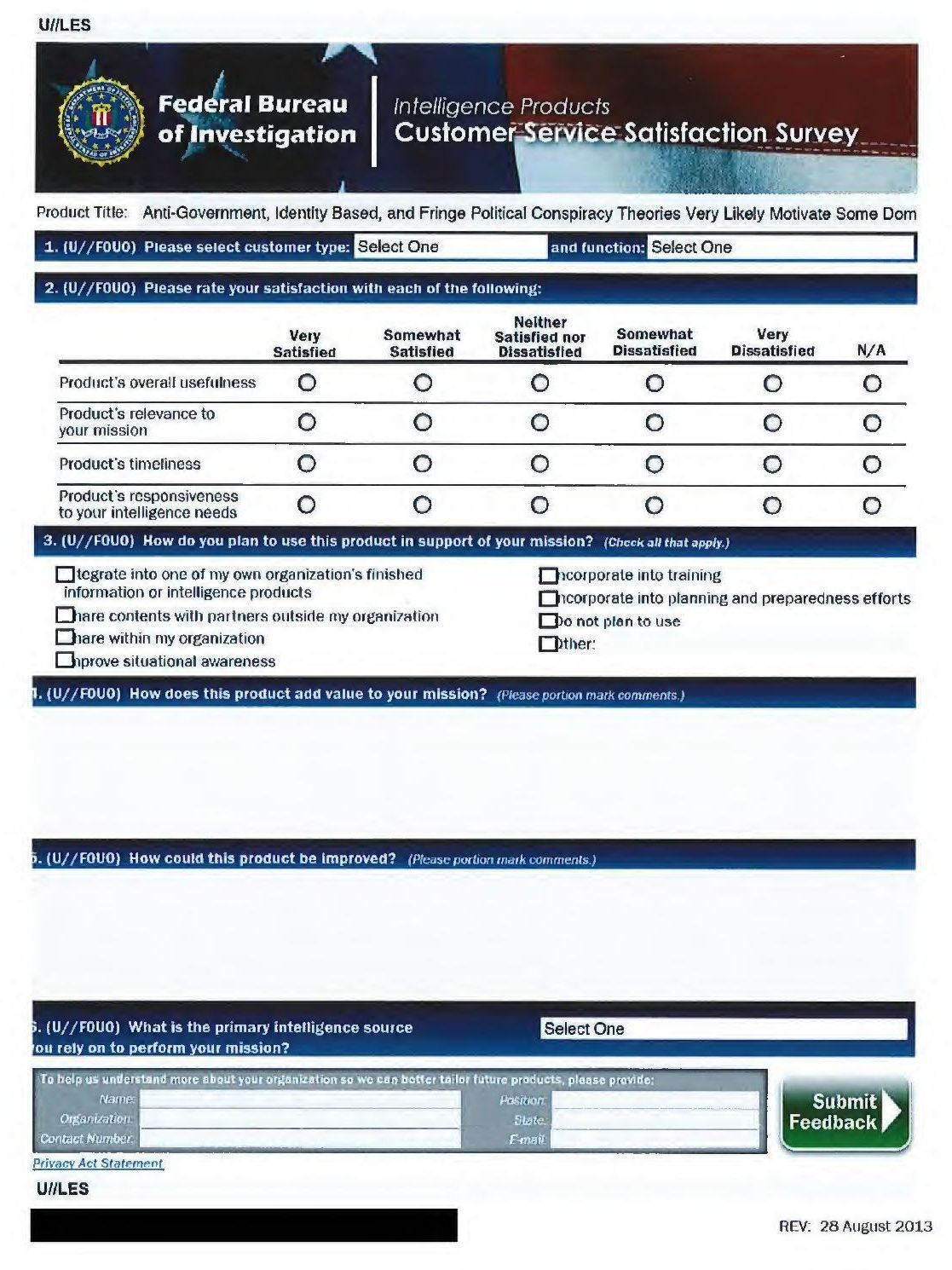
A four-item six-point customer service satisfaction form

Organizations need to retain existing customers while targeting non-customers. Measuring customer satisfaction provides an indication of how successful the organization is at providing products or services to the marketplace.

"Customer satisfaction is measured at the individual level, but it is almost always reported at an aggregate level. It can be, and often is, measured along various dimensions. A hotel, for example, might ask customers to rate their experience with its front desk and check-in service, with the room, with the amenities in the room, with the restaurants, and so on. Additionally, in a holistic sense, the hotel might ask about overall satisfaction 'with your stay.'"

As research on consumption experiences grows, evidence suggests that consumers purchase goods and services for a combination of two types of benefits: hedonic and utilitarian. Hedonic benefits are associated with the sensory and experiential attributes of the product. Utilitarian benefits of a product are associated with the more instrumental and functional attributes of the product (Batra and Athola 1990).

Customer satisfaction is an ambiguous and abstract concept and the actual manifestation of the state of satisfaction will vary from person to person and product/service to product/service. The state of satisfaction depends on a number of both psychological and physical variables which correlate with satisfaction behaviors such as return and recommend rate. The level of satisfaction can also vary depending on other options the customer may have and other products against which the customer can compare the organization's products.

Work done by Parasuraman, Zeithaml and Berry (Leonard L) between 1985 and 1988 provides the basis for the measurement of customer satisfaction with a service by using the gap between the customer's expectation of performance and their perceived experience of performance. This provides the measurer with a satisfaction "gap" which is objective and quantitative in nature. Work done by Cronin and Taylor propose the "confirmation/disconfirmation" theory of combining the "gap" described by Parasuraman, Zeithaml and Berry as two different measures (perception and expectation of performance) into a single measurement of performance according to expectation.

The usual measures of customer satisfaction involve a survey using a Likert scale. The customer is asked to evaluate each statement in terms of their perceptions and expectations of performance of the organization being measured.

Good quality measures need to have high satisfaction loading, good reliability, and low error variances. In an empirical study comparing commonly used satisfaction measures it was found that two multi-item semantic differential scales performed best across both hedonic and utilitarian service consumption contexts. A study by Wirtz & Lee (2003), found that a six-item 7-point semantic differential scale (for example, Oliver and Swan 1983), which is a six-item 7-point bipolar scale, consistently performed best across both hedonic and utilitarian services. It loaded most highly on satisfaction, had the highest item reliability, and had by far the lowest error variance across both studies. In the study, the six items asked respondents' evaluation of their most recent experience with ATM services and ice cream restaurant, along seven points within these six items: "pleased me to displeased me", "contented with to disgusted with", "very satisfied with to very dissatisfied with", "did a good job for me to did a poor job for me", "wise choice to poor choice" and "happy with to unhappy with". A semantic differential (4 items) scale (e.g., Eroglu and Machleit 1990), which is a four-item 7-point bipolar scale, was the second best performing measure, which was again consistent across both contexts. In the study, respondents were asked to evaluate their experience with both products, along seven points within these four items: "satisfied to dissatisfied", "favorable to unfavorable", "pleasant to unpleasant" and "I like it very much to I didn't like it at all". The third best scale was single-item percentage measure, a one-item 7-point bipolar scale (e.g., Westbrook 1980). Again, the respondents were asked to evaluate their experience on both ATM services and ice cream restaurants, along seven points within "delighted to terrible".

Finally, all measures captured both affective and cognitive aspects of satisfaction, independent of their scale anchors. Affective measures capture a consumer's attitude (liking/disliking) towards a product, which can result from any product information or experience. On the other hand, cognitive element is defined as an appraisal or conclusion on how the product's performance compared against expectations (or exceeded or fell short of expectations), was useful (or not useful), fit the situation (or did not fit), exceeded the requirements of the situation (or did not exceed).

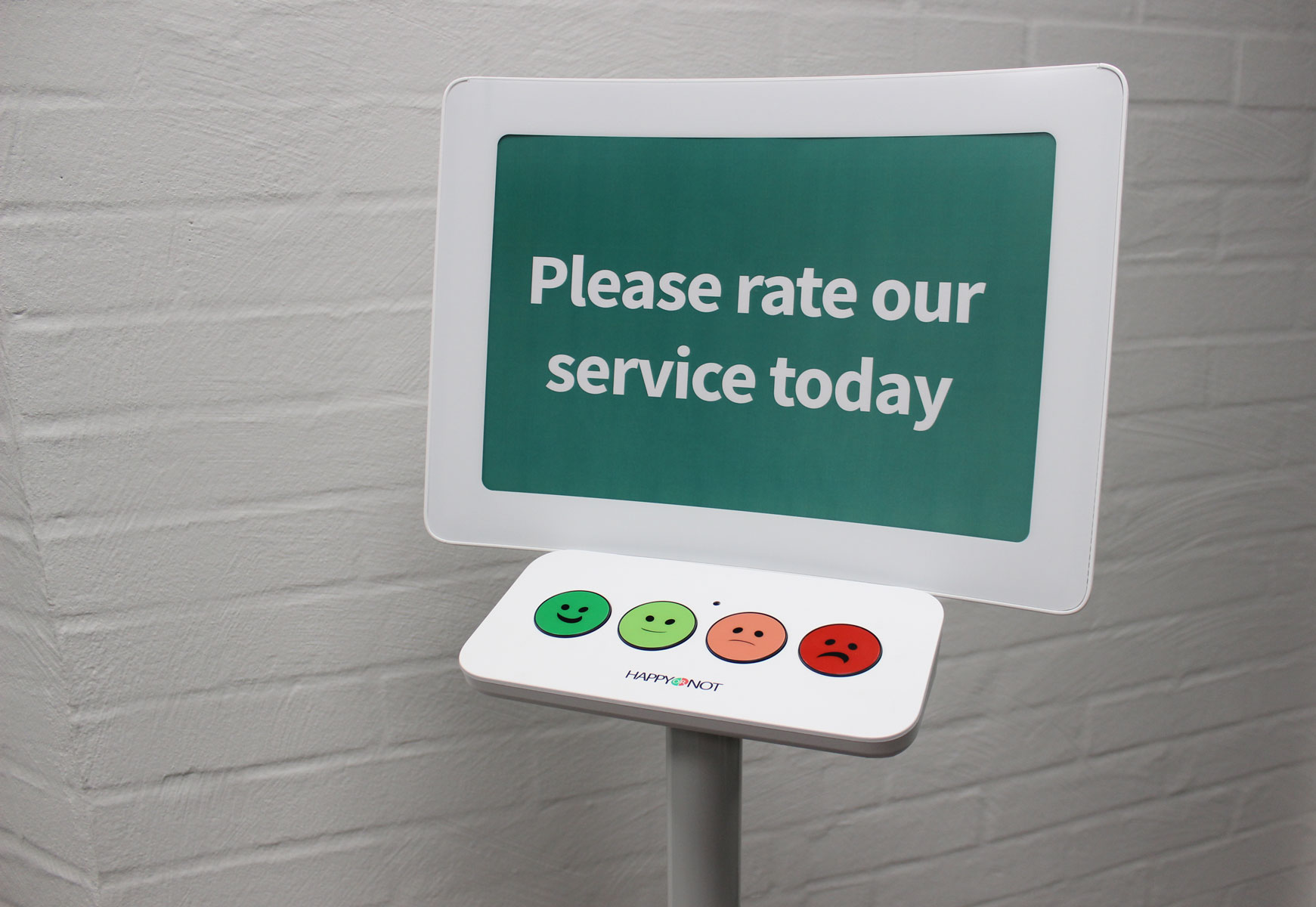
A single-item four-point HappyOrNot customer satisfaction feedback terminal

Recent research shows that in most commercial applications, such as firms conducting customer surveys, a single-item overall satisfaction scale performs just as well as a multi-item scale. Especially in larger scale studies where a researcher needs to gather data from a large number of customers, a single-item scale may be preferred because it can reduce total survey error. An interesting recent finding from re-interviewing the same clients of a firm is that only 50% of respondents give the same satisfaction rating when re-interviewed, even when there has been no service encounter between the client and firm between surveys. The study found a 'regression to the mean' effect in customer satisfaction responses, whereby the respondent group who gave unduly low scores in the first survey regressed up toward the mean level in the second, while the group who gave unduly high scores tended to regress downward toward the overall mean level in the second survey.

== Methodologies ==
The American Customer Satisfaction Index (ACSI) is a scientific standard of customer satisfaction. Academic research has shown that the national ACSI score is a strong predictor of gross domestic product (GDP) growth, and an even stronger predictor of personal consumption expenditure (PCE) growth. On the microeconomic level, academic studies have shown that ACSI data is related to a firm's financial performance in terms of return on investment (ROI), sales, long-term firm value (Tobin's q), cash flow, cash flow volatility, human capital performance, portfolio returns, debt financing, risk, and consumer spending. Increasing ACSI scores have been shown to predict loyalty, word-of-mouth recommendations, and purchase behavior. The ACSI measures customer satisfaction annually for more than 200 companies in 43 industries and 10 economic sectors. In addition to quarterly reports, the ACSI methodology can be applied to private sector companies and government agencies in order to improve loyalty and purchase intent.

The Kano model is a theory of product development and customer satisfaction developed in the 1980s by Professor Noriaki Kano that classifies customer preferences into five categories: Attractive, One-Dimensional, Must-Be, Indifferent, Reverse. The Kano model offers some insight into the product attributes which are perceived to be important to customers.

SERVQUAL or RATER is a service-quality framework that has been incorporated into customer-satisfaction surveys (e.g., the revised Norwegian Customer Satisfaction Barometer) to indicate the gap between customer expectations and experience.

J.D. Power and Associates provides another measure of customer satisfaction, known for its top-box approach and automotive industry rankings. J.D. Power and Associates' marketing research consists primarily of consumer surveys and is publicly known for the value of its product awards.

Other research and consulting firms have customer satisfaction solutions as well. These include A.T. Kearney's Customer Satisfaction Audit process, which incorporates the Stages of Excellence framework and which helps define a company's status against eight critically identified dimensions.

The Net Promoter Score (NPS) is also used to measure customer satisfaction. On a scale of 0 to 10, this score measures the willingness of customers to recommend a company to others. Despite many points of criticism from a scientific point of view, the NPS is widely used in practice. Its popularity and broad use have been attributed to its simplicity and its openly available methodology.

For B2B customer satisfaction surveys, where there is a small customer base, a high response rate to the survey is desirable. The American Customer Satisfaction Index (2012) found that response rates for paper-based surveys were around 10% and the response rates for e-surveys (web, wap and e-mail) were averaging between 5% and 15% - which can only provide a straw poll of the customers' opinions.

In the European Union member states, many methods for measuring impact and satisfaction of e-government services are in use, which the eGovMoNet project sought to compare and harmonize.

These customer satisfaction methodologies have not been independently audited by the Marketing Accountability Standards Board according to MMAP (marketing metric audit protocol).

There are many operational strategies for improving customer satisfaction but at the most fundamental level customer expectations are what need to be understood.

Recently there has been a growing interest in predicting customer satisfaction using big data and machine learning methods (with behavioral and demographic features as predictors) to take targeted preventive actions aimed at avoiding churn, complaints and dissatisfaction.

== Prevalence ==
A 2008 survey found that only 3.5% of Chinese consumers were satisfied with their online shopping experience. A 2020 Arizona State University survey found that customer satisfaction in the United States is deteriorating. Roughly two-thirds of survey participants reported feeling "rage" over their experiences as consumers. A multi-decade decline in consumer satisfaction since the 1970s was observed. A majority of respondents felt that their customer service complaints were not sufficiently addressed by businesses. A 2022 report found that consumer experiences in the United States had declined substantially in the 2 years since the beginning of the COVID-19 pandemic. In the United Kingdom in 2022, customer service complaints were at record highs, owing to staffing shortages and the supply crisis related to the COVID pandemic.

Recent Trends in Customer Satisfaction Research

The Customer Satisfaction Index Model (CSI Model) described above originated from studies such as Fornell et al. (1996), and adopts a model structure in which Expectations, Perceived Quality, and Perceived Value influence Customer Satisfaction. Furthermore, the ACSI (American Customer Satisfaction Index Model) employs a structure in which the Satisfaction construct is derived from overall satisfaction and expectation disconfirmation. Although the CSI model continues to exert strong influence, recent academic research has increasingly treated this structure as a reference point and has explored and analyzed it from a variety of new perspectives.

For example, Spreng and Chiou (2002) presented findings suggesting that lowering expectation levels in accordance with the Disconfirmation effect does not necessarily lead to higher satisfaction. They emphasized the importance of the Assimilation effect, whereby higher expectations enhance satisfaction through improvements in perceived quality. Schiebler et al. (2025)conducted a meta-analysis of 150 studies (total sample size: N = 58,597) and demonstrated that expectations and consumer satisfaction exhibit an overall weak positive correlation. Nagashima (2026) [45], while theoretically and empirically supporting the appropriateness of the Disconfirmation model structure, suggested that the magnitude of the Disconfirmation effect differs substantially across Asian markets. Based on these findings, it is inferred that the Assimilation effect becomes stronger when the evaluated service involves a sense of exclusivity or rarity. Moreover, expectations are considered problematic as fixed constructs (factors) within a model because expectation levels fluctuate, for example, increasing at the time of decision-making. In addition, heightened expectations or excitement experienced during decision-making tend to be positively recalled over time after the experience as "good memories".

== See also ==
- Business case
- Computer user satisfaction
- Customer satisfaction research
- Customer service
- The International Customer Service Institute
