= Sales effectiveness =

Sales effectiveness refers to the ability of a company's sales professionals to "win" at each stage of the customer's buying process, and ultimately earn the business on the right terms and in the right timeframe. Improving sales effectiveness is not just a sales function issue; it's a company issue, as it requires collaboration between sales and marketing to understand what is working and not working, and continuous improvement of the knowledge, messages, skills, and strategies that sales people apply as they work sales opportunities.

Sales effectiveness has historically been used to describe a category of technologies and consulting services aimed at helping companies improve their sales results. Many companies are creating sales effectiveness functions and have even given people titles such as VP of Sales Effectiveness. "By analyzing sales force performance, managers can make changes to optimize sales going forward. Toward that end, there are many ways to gauge the performance of individual salespeople and of the sales force as a whole, in addition to total annual sales." In a survey of nearly 200 senior marketing managers, 54 per cent responded that they found the "sales force effectiveness" metric useful.

== Purpose ==
The purpose of sales force effectiveness is to increase company revenues through increased customer acquisition, product/service sales, and up-selling/cross-selling additional products and services. The purpose of sales force effectiveness metrics is "to measure the performance of a sales force and of individual salespeople." "When analyzing the performance of a salesperson, a number of performance indicators can be compared. These can reveal more about the salesperson than can be gauged by his or her total sales. When analyzing the performance of a sales team, an increase in revenue-per-rep can indicate improvement in salesforce effectiveness."

== Construction ==
An authoritative source lists the following ratios as useful in assessing the relative effectiveness of sales personnel.

1. Sales ($) / Contacts with Clients (Calls) (#)
2. Sales ($) / Potential Accounts (#)
3. Sales ($) / Active Accounts (#)
4. Sales ($) / Buying Power ($)

"These formulas can be useful for comparing salespeople from different territories and for examining trends over time. They can reveal distinctions that can be obscured by total sales results, particularly in districts where territories vary in size, in the number of potential accounts, or in buying power. These ratios provide insight into the factors behind sales performance. If an individual's sales per call ratio are low, for example, that may indicate that the salesperson in question needs training in moving customers toward larger purchases. Or it may indicate a lack of closing skills. If the sales per potential account or sales per buying power metric is low, the salesperson may not be doing enough to seek out new accounts. These metrics reveal much about prospecting and lead generation because they're based on each salesperson's entire territory, including potential as well as current customers. The sales per active account metric provide a useful indicator of a salesperson's effectiveness in maximizing the value of existing customers. Although it is important to make the most of every call, a salesperson will not reach his or her goal in just one call. A certain amount of effort is required to complete sales." Churchill published research work on "the determinants of salesperson performance", and the antecedents of sales performance is based on the meta-analysis for the period 1918- 1982 (76 years of previous research work). The author suggested five factors that influence a salesperson's job behaviour and performance along with different categories like skill level, role perceptions, motivation, aptitude, personal factors, and organizational factors with three moderators.

== Cross functional sales performance factors ==
There are several cross-functional sales performance factors which affect the overall company sales performance. Cross-selling service climate provides very important boundary condition which affects both its formation and its impact on service sales performance. Organizations facing increasing complex customer requirements. Most of the salespeople globally do not achieve their targets. A salesperson is the only direct link between customer and company. The factors affecting sales force performance in rural or urban areas are the notable driver for any organizational success.

Cross-functional items like reasonable sales target setting, pre-sales, branding, marketing, product knowledge, incentive achievement, company image, branding and many may put an effect on the performance of the company. These are the indicators which influence the overall sales performance, and the core problems that hold salespeople back from hitting their target and the revenue for the company.

== Methodologies ==
Benchmarking is a methodology used to evaluate the sales effectiveness of an organization. Benchmarking is a process to improve the operational efficacy of a department and/or an organization. Company makes benchmark by rating itself against others for better business practices to identify factors which will help them to perform better than its competitors. A comprehensive survey of over 11,000 frontline salespeople and 7,000 sales manager was conducted by The Blackdot which identified that a well defined sales process is the key driver for sales performance. The benchmark study also identified 5 distinctive groups of people existing in every organization:

- True believers - Has great adherence towards the sales process and believes its enabling powers
- Complaints - Follows the sales process but do not believe it as enabling
- Mavericks - Recognizes that a well-defined sales process exists, but choose to follow their own processes
- Self Reliants - Does not know that a defined sales process exists and needs to work it out themselves
- Clueless - The remaining group who confesses that they do not know of any sales process and do not believe it as enabling.

Note: No sales force effectiveness methodologies have been independently audited by the Marketing Accountability Standards Board (MASB) according to Marketing Metric Audit Protocol (MMAP).

== Prime costs ==
Gross revenue is determined by deducting the cost of production from the revenue and the wholesale and retail companies deduct the cost of production in purchase prices. All the costs of serving customers are then calculated and spread by customer. The prime costs include:

- Storage costs. The product was stored in a warehouse until it was shipped and the company incurred expenses based on the size of the warehouse space and storage time. Knowing the storage charges, it is possible to calculate the storage costs of products that have been shipped to the customer.
- Logistics costs. If the organisation carries out the distribution at its own expense, these costs reduce the profit generated from sales.
- Marketing costs: promotions, merchandising, POS materials, souvenirs, catalogues, targeted promotion programs, etc. constitute a significant share of expenses. They should also be allocated to customers as accurately as possible, based on actual costs in a particular channel or customer segment.
- Commercial service costs. Sellers' costs include not only salaries and taxes, but also travel expenses and IT investments (automation of labor-intensive tasks reduces the transaction cycle, which is especially important for the B2B segment, where the cycle averages about three months), communications, etc.
- Investments in warehousing. This is essentially frozen cash of the company, the value of which is also calculated in the way that is customary in the company's accounting system, e.g. at the refinancing rate.
- Granting deferrals of payments. Such deferrals are provided for in the commercial policy of most companies. Different customers use loans in different amounts. The value of the money frozen in loans should also be taken into account when assessing sales efficiency.
- Other costs. It is important to consider other service costs: the costs of placing and picking up the order, the costs of invoicing and accepting payments, etc.

It is important not only to ration and strive to reduce costs, but also to determine the balance between different types of expenses, so that inputs yield the maximum return.
