= Retention rate =

Measurement of customers or participants who are maintained or returned

Retention rate is a statistical measurement of the proportion of people that remain involved with a group from one time period to another.

The concept is used in many contexts, including marketing, investment, education, employee management, research, and clinical trials. The exact definition depends on the context. As a general rule, high retention corresponds to a positive outcome.

In marketing, retention rate count customers and their activity irrespective transactions they make.

In a survey of nearly 200 senior marketing managers, 63 percent responded that they found the "retention rate" metric very useful.

== Purpose ==
The purpose of the "retention rate" metric in a marketing atmosphere is to monitor firm performance in attracting and retaining customers. "Only recently have most marketers worried about developing metrics that focus on individual customers. In order to begin to think about managing individual customer relationships, the firm must first be able to count its customers. Although consistency in counting customers is probably more important than formulating a precise definition, a definition is needed nonetheless. In particular, we think the definition of and the counting of customers will be different in contractual versus non-contractual situations." Since there are multiple definitions of retention rates this could cause issues with interpreting retention rates in practice.

In the workplace arena, the purpose of the retention rate is to assist organizations with deciding when to take action in order to keep employees happy and motivated. According to a survey by CNN Money, the top 100 best companies to work for had less than a 3% turnover rate during a 12-month period.

Retention rate may also refer to colleges. According to the FAFSA, the retention rate is the percentage of a school’s first-time, first-year undergraduate students who continue at that school the next year. For example, a student who studies full-time in the fall semester and keeps on studying in the program in the next fall semester is counted in this rate.

== Contracts ==
"Retention applies to contractual situations in which customers are either retained or not. Customers either renew their magazine subscriptions or let them run out. Customers maintain a current account with a bank until they close it. Renters pay rent until they move out. These are examples of pure customer retention situations where customers are either retained or considered lost for good. In these situations, firms pay close attention to retention rates."

Retention Rate: The ratio of the number of customers retained to the number at risk.

== Workplace ==
Retention in the workplace refers to “the percentage of employees who were employed at the beginning of a period, and remain with the company at the end of the period”. For example, in January 2010, Company A had 500 employees. After one year, 200 of the 500 employees were still working for the company. The retention rate is 200/500 x 100 = 40%.

== See also ==
- Employee retention
- Turnover (employment)
- University student retention

== Methodologies ==
No retention rate methodologies have been independently audited by the Marketing Accountability Standards Board (MASB) according to MMAP (Marketing Metric Audit Protocol).
