= MMAP =

- Marketing Metric Audit Protocol (MMAP)
- Memory map
- mmap, a UNIX system call for mapping files to memory
- Marked Markovian Arrival Process
