= ECTS =

ECTS may refer to:

- Engine coolant temperature sensor
- European Computer Trade Show
- European Credit Transfer and Accumulation System, a higher education standard
  - ECTS grading scale

== See also ==
- European Train Control System (ETCS)
- ECT (disambiguation)
