= All I Want for Christmas Is You =

1994 single by Mariah Carey

Single by Mariah Carey

from the album Merry Christmas
- B-side: "Miss You Most (At Christmas Time)"; "Joy to the World"
- Written: 1994
- Released: October 29, 1994
- Recorded: August 1994
- Studio: The Hit Factory (New York City)
- Genre: Christmas; pop; pop soul; R&B
- Length: 4:01
- Label: Columbia
- Composers: Mariah Carey; Walter Afanasieff
- Lyricist: Mariah Carey
- Producers: Mariah Carey; Walter Afanasieff

Mariah Carey singles chronology
"Endless Love" (1994)	"All I Want for Christmas Is You" (1994)	"Miss You Most (At Christmas Time)" (1994)

Music videos
- "All I Want for Christmas Is You" on YouTube
- "All I Want for Christmas Is You" (Black & White) on YouTube
- "All I Want for Christmas Is You" (Make My Wish Come True Edition) on YouTube

"All I Want for Christmas Is You" is a song by American singer-songwriter Mariah Carey from her fourth studio album and first holiday album, Merry Christmas (1994). She wrote and produced the song with Walter Afanasieff. It was released as the lead single from the album on October 29, 1994, by Columbia Records. The track is an uptempo love song that talks about prioritizing time with a lover over receiving gifts. It includes bell chimes, backing vocals, and synthesizers. "All I Want for Christmas Is You" has received critical acclaim, with The New Yorker describing it as "one of the few worthy modern additions to the holiday canon". The song has become a Christmas standard, and it significantly rises in popularity every December.

It was a success when first released, reaching number 6 on the Billboard Hot Adult Contemporary chart in the United States and number 2 in the United Kingdom and Japan. The advent of music streaming has led to renewed success for the single, which annually re-enters charts worldwide in the weeks before Christmas and has reached number 1 in over thirty countries. "All I Want for Christmas Is You" broke the record for the longest gap between release and reaching number 1 in both the United States and the United Kingdom, 25 and 26 years respectively. The song spent 22 non-consecutive weeks atop the Billboard Hot 100 and was the then-longest-running number-one single in US chart history. It is the best-selling Christmas song in the US. The track has been certified Diamond in Australia, Canada, Sweden, and the US. "All I Want for Christmas Is You" has sold over 16 million copies worldwide, making it one of the best-selling digital singles. As of 2023, the Associated Press estimated the song's royalty earnings at $100 million. That same year, it was selected by the Library of Congress for inclusion in the National Recording Registry.

== Production ==
Following the success of her 1993 album Music Box, Carey and her management at Columbia Records—including Carey's then-husband, Tommy Mottola, head of Columbia's parent label Sony Music Entertainment—began planning further projects. The group discussed recording a Christmas album, but hesitated, as such albums were typically released when artists' careers are waning. Carey's songwriting partner of over four years, Walter Afanasieff, said in 2015: "Back then, you didn't have a lot of artists with Christmas albums. It wasn't a known science at all back then, and there was nobody who did new, big Christmas songs. So we were going to release it as kind of an everyday, 'Hey, you know, we're putting out a Christmas album. No big deal.'"

After Mottola persisted, Carey and Afanasieff began writing and composing songs for Merry Christmas in June 1994. When recording "All I Want for Christmas Is You" that August, Carey had Christmas decorations set up in the studio. She later called this "an amazing recording session, like no other".

Initially, Afanasieff admitted that he was puzzled and "blanched" as to where Carey wanted to take the melody and vocal scales, though she was "adamant" in her direction for the song. In an interview with Billboard, Afanasieff described the type of relationship he and Carey shared in the studio and as songwriters:

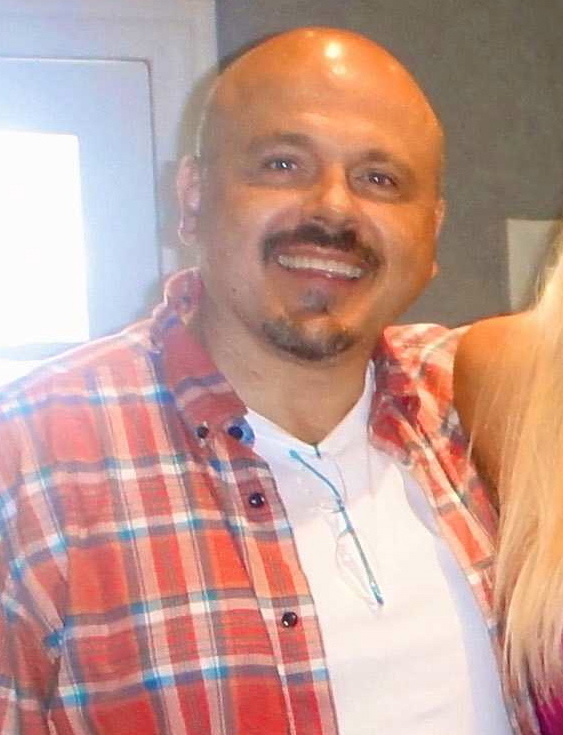
Walter Afanasieff co-wrote and co-produced the song with Carey.

It was always the same sort of system with us. We would write the nucleus of the song, the melody primary music, and then some of the words were there as we finished writing it. I started playing some rock 'n' roll piano and started boogie woogie-ing my left hand, and that inspired Mariah to come up with the melodic [Sings.] 'I don't want a lot for Christmas.' And then we started singing and playing around with this rock 'n' roll boogie song, which immediately came out to be the nucleus of what would end up being 'All I Want For Christmas Is You.' That one went very quickly: It was an easier song to write than some of the other ones. It was very formulaic, not a lot of chord changes. I tried to make it a little more unique, putting in some special chords that you really don't hear a lot of, which made it unique and special.

Then for the next week or two Mariah would call me and say, 'What do you think about this bit?' We would talk a little bit until she got the lyrics all nicely coordinated and done. And then we just waited until the sessions began, which were in the summer of '94 where we got together in New York and started recording. And that's when we first hear her at the microphone singing, and the rest is history.

Afanasieff flew back to California, where he finished the song's programming and production. Originally, he had a live band play the drums and other instruments with the thought of giving it a more raw and affective sound. He was unhappy with the results of the recording and subsequently scrapped the effort and used his original, personal arrangement and programmed all the instruments heard on the song (with the exception of the background vocals) including the piano, effects, drums and triangle. While Carey continued writing material in her rented home in The Hamptons, Afanasieff completed the song's programming and awaited to rendezvous with her a final time in order to layer and harmonize the background vocals.

In touching on several aspects of what excited her to record and release her Christmas album, Carey went into detail on what writing and recording the song and album meant for her, pointing out, "I'm a very festive person and I love the holidays. I've sung Christmas songs since I was a little girl. I used to go Christmas caroling. When it came to the album, we had to have a nice balance between standard Christian hymns and fun songs. It was definitely a priority for me to write at least a few new songs, but for the most part people really want to hear the standards at Christmas time, no matter how good a new song is."

Walter Afanasieff sold part of his producer royalties for $480,000.

== Composition ==
"All I Want for Christmas Is You"
A 23-second sample of the song's chorus and various computerized programming, instruments and background vocals. Combined with Carey's vocals, the sample illustrates the song's hearkening and inspiration drawn from previous decades as well as what music critics attribute its success to.

"All I Want for Christmas Is You" is an uptempo song, composed with pop, soul, R&B, gospel, dance-pop and adult contemporary influences and stylings. By early August, Carey already had two original songs written alongside Afanasieff including the "sad and ballad-y" "Miss You Most (At Christmas Time)" and the "Gospel-tinged and religious" "Jesus Born on This Day". The third and final original song the pair planned to write was to be centered and inspired and in the vein of a "Phil Spector, old rock 'n roll, sixties-sounding Christmas song".

The song begins with a "sparkling bit of percussion" chimes played by celesta, resembling "an antique music box or a whimsical snow globe." The opening chimes is also described to share similarities with the musical structure of celesta from Tchaikovsky's The Nutcracker as the instrumental build-up and gradual layering of musical elements in both pieces help "creating a growing sense of excitement" in anticipation of the holiday season. After Carey's a cappella style vocal introduction, the song introduces other seasonal percussive signifiers including; celebratory church-like bells, cheerful sleigh bells, and "an underlying rhythmic beat that sounds like the loping pace of a horse or reindeer. These sounds echo religious and secular musical touchstones, without veering blatantly too much in either direction, and give the song an upbeat, joyous tone."

"Carey's masterpiece is an incredible feat of philosophical subterfuge. Christmas is a time of material and affection-based excess, yet the song is narrowly focused on just one thing: getting to be with a specific person, e.g., you. It rejects the idea of love in general in favor of love in particular, simultaneously defying and defining pop-music conventions. With infinitely more economy of expression and undoubtedly catchier lyrics, 'All I Want for Christmas Is You' is a sort of Hegelian dialectic of Christmastime desire, taking the conflicting notions of abundance and specificity and packaging them neatly into an earworm for the generations."

— Emma Green, The Atlantic

In a 1994 interview, Carey described the song as "fun", and continued: "It's very traditional, old-fashioned Christmas. It's very retro, kind of '60s." Afanasieff went further in breaking down the song's musical elements: "A lush bed of keyboards, reminiscent of a small-scale Wall of Sound, cushions the song's cheery rhythms, while a soulful vocal chorus adds robust oohs, tension-creating counter-melodies, and festive harmonies. Most notably, however, the song's jaunty piano chords and melody keep the song merrily bouncing along."

Lyrically, the song describes the singer not caring about the usual material aspect of the holiday season such as ornamental lights, trees, snow and presents, as long as they are with their lover for Christmas. The song incorporates various instruments, including piano, drums, violin, oboe, flute, bell chimes, bass effect, and cowbells. The song layers background vocals throughout the chorus and sections of the bridge.

After the rubato introduction, "All I Want for Christmas Is You" has an indicated tempo of 150 beats per minute. According to the sheet music published at Musicnotes.com by Sony/ATV Music Publishing, the song is set in common time and in the key of G major. Carey's vocals in the song range from the low note of G_{3} to the high note of A_{5}. Carey wrote the song's lyrics and developed its melody, while Afanasieff helped with the musical composition and produced it. He also arranged and programmed all of the instruments using synthesized sources.

Slate's Adam Ragusea counts "at least 13 distinct chords at work, resulting in a sumptuously chromatic melody. The song also includes what I consider the most Christmassy chord of all—a minor subdominant, or 'iv,' chord with an added 6, under the words 'underneath the Christmas tree,' among other places. (You might also analyze it as a half-diminished 'ii' 7th chord, but either interpretation seems accurate)." According to Roch Parisien from AllMusic, the song contains "Beach Boys–style harmonies, jangling bells, and a sleigh-ride pace, injecting one of the few bits of exuberant fun in this otherwise vanilla set."

Critics have noted the song's 1940s, 1950s, and 1960s influences which, in conjunction with Carey's voice and its simple melody, heralded its recipe for success. In discussing the song's chord progression and stylistic approaches, Slate's Ragusea hailed the song as "the only Christmas song written in the last half-century worthy of inclusion in the Great American Songbook." The A.V. Club's Annie Zaleski attributes the song's enduring appeal to its ambiguity in being able to pin it down as belonging to a specific era.

== Reception ==
"All I Want for Christmas Is You" received widespread acclaim. Roch Parisien from AllMusic called the song "a year-long banger", complimenting its instrumentation and melody. Steve Morse, editor of The Boston Globe, wrote that Carey sang with a lot of soul. In his review for Carey's Merry Christmas II You, Thomas Connor from the Chicago Sun-Times called the song "a simple, well-crafted chestnut and one of the last great additions to the Christmas pop canon". Shona Craven of Scotland's The Herald said, "[it's] a song of optimism and joy that maybe, just maybe, hints at the real meaning of Christmas." Additionally, she felt the main reason it was so successful is the subject "you" in the lyrics, explaining, "Perhaps what makes the song such a huge hit is the fact that it's for absolutely everyone." Craven opened her review with a bold statement: "Bing Crosby may well be turning in his grave, but no child of the 1980s will be surprised to see Mariah Carey's sublime All I Want For Christmas Is You bounding up the charts after being named the nation's top festive song." While reviewing the 2009 remix version, Becky Bain from Idolator called the song a "timeless classic" and wrote, "We love the original song to pieces—we blast it while decorating our Christmas tree and lighting our Menorah."

Kyle Anderson from MTV labeled the track "a majestic anthem full of chimes, sleigh bells, doo-wop flourishes, sweeping strings and one of the most dynamic and clean vocal performances of Carey's career". Music & Media commented, "Phil Spector's Christmas album has been the main inspiration for this carol in a "Darlene Love against the wall of sound" tradition." Music Week wrote, "Mariah meets Phil Spector, some chimes and the inevitable sleigh-bells; this is everything you would expect from a Mariah Carey record." In a 2006 retrospective look at Carey's career, Sasha Frere-Jones of The New Yorker said, the "charming" song was one of Carey's biggest accomplishments, calling it "one of the few worthy modern additions to the holiday canon". Dan Hancox, editor of The National, quoted and agreed with Jones's statement, calling the song "perfection". According to Barry Schwartz from Stylus Magazine, "to say this song is an instant classic somehow doesn't capture its amazingicity; it's a modern standard: joyous, exhilarating, loud, with even a hint of longing." Schwartz also praised the song's lyrics, describing them as "beautifully phrased", and calling Carey's voice "gorgeous" and "sincere".

The song's ubiquitousness during the festive season also has its criticisms. Retail workers have expressed their disdain for it due to frequent airplay at their job, with a poll by customer feedback company HappyOrNot naming the song as being the most unpopular amongst American retail staff. In 2022, three separate Change.org petitions appeared calling for "All I Want for Christmas Is You" to be banned from stores and radio stations. Similarly, a 2019 poll by Huawei found the song was the one that British festive shoppers found "the most annoying".

== Chart performance ==
=== North America ===
Year	Chart debut/re-entry date	Peak chart position	Ref.
2000	January 8	83	
2012	December 22	21	
2013	December 21	26	
2014	December 20	35	
2015	December 19	11	
2016	December 17	16	
2017	December 16	9	
2018	December 1	3	
2019	November 23	1 (2 weeks)	
2020	November 28	1 (2)	
2021	November 27	1 (2)	
2022	November 26	1 (5)	
2023	November 25	1 (3)	
2024	November 30	1 (3)	
2025	January 4	1 (4)	
2026	January 3	1 (1)	

In the United States, in the first week of January 1995, "All I Want for Christmas Is You" peaked at numbers 6 and 12 respectively on the Billboard Hot Adult Contemporary and the Hot 100 Airplay charts. The song placed on these two charts again in December 1995 and in December 1996. The song was ineligible for inclusion on the Billboard Hot 100 during its original release, because it was not released commercially as a single in any physical format. This rule lapsed in 1998, however, allowing the song to chart on the Billboard Hot 100 (appearing for one week, at No. 83 in January 2000). The song topped the Billboard Hot Digital Songs chart in December 2005, but it was unable to attain a new peak on the Billboard Hot 100 chart because it was considered a recurrent single and was thus ineligible for chart re-entry.

Every December from 2005 to 2008, the song topped the Billboard Hot 100 Re-currents chart. In 2012, after the recurrent rule was revised to allow all songs in the top 50 onto the Billboard Hot 100 chart, the single re-entered the chart at number 29 and peaked at number 21 for the week ending January 5, 2013. In December 2017, the song reached number 9 on the Billboard Hot 100, giving Carey her 28th top 10 song in the country and her first since "Obsessed" in 2009. "All I Want For Christmas Is You" subsequently rose to No. 3 on the chart dated January 5, 2019, becoming the second holiday track to reach its top 5 after "The Chipmunk Song (Christmas Don't Be Late)" in 1958.

On the US Rolling Stone 100, the song topped the charts during the week of December 12, 2019, becoming Carey's first number 1 song on the chart. On the chart dated December 21, 2019, "All I Want for Christmas Is You" topped the Hot 100 for the first time with 45.6 million streams and 27,000 digital sales sold. It reached the top spot after thirty-five cumulative weeks on the chart, making it the slowest climb to the top spot in the chart's history, surpassing "Macarena (Bayside Boys Remix)" by Los del Río which reached number 1 in August 1996 after thirty-three weeks on the chart, and it would remain until Glass Animals' "Heat Waves" broke the record in 2022 when it topped the Hot 100 on its 59th week. Additionally, it broke the record for the longest trip to number 1, reaching the spot twenty-five years after the song's original release. It was only the second time in the over six decades of the Hot 100's history that a Christmas song hit number 1 on the main chart and the first to do so since "The Chipmunk Song" in 1958. With "All I Want For Christmas Is You", Carey extended her record of having the most number 1 songs for a solo artist on the Hot 100 with nineteen and Carey achieved a record-extending 80th week at number 1 on the Hot 100. Although released in 1994, "All I Want for Christmas Is You" was the last number 1 single of the 2010s decade, as well as the first number 1 of the 2020s decade, spending a third week atop the Hot 100 chart dated January 4, 2020, and in doing so, Carey became the first artist to top the chart in four separate decades: 1990s, 2000s, 2010s and 2020s chart.

"All I Want for Christmas Is You" has returned to its peak at number 1 every holiday season since. In doing so, the song became the longest-running holiday chart-topper and the first song in the chart's history to reach the top spot in at least three separate chart runs. Because of its holiday theme, the song is also the first to fall completely off the Hot 100 chart the week following its final week at the top. The only other song to reach number 1 in two separate chart runs is Chubby Checker's "The Twist". With the song's success on the chart, Carey also earned her record-extending ninetieth week at number 1.

When the song returned to number 1 for a sixth non-consecutive week on the chart dated December 25, 2021, Carey became the first artist to top two Hot 100 charts dated Dec 25, following "Hero" in 1993. With the song's eighth week atop the chart, Carey tied Drake as the artist with the most songs to spend eight or more weeks at number 1 on the Hot 100, both with five songs in total. After the song returned to number 1 for the tenth week, Carey became the first female artist, and third overall after Boyz II Men and Drake, to have three songs which topped the chart for ten or more weeks. When the song reached number 1 for a thirteenth week, "All I Want for Christmas is You" became the first song to top the Hot 100 in five distinct runs on the chart, and tied Boyz II Men as the only artists with three songs that have topped the Hot 100 for thirteen or more weeks each; this was broken the following week, as the song spent a fourteenth week at number 1, making Carey the first artist to have three number 1 songs which spent fourteen or more weeks on the chart. After getting its seventeenth week at number 1 on the Hot 100, "All I Want for Christmas is You" surpassed "One Sweet Day" to become Carey's longest-running number 1 song in the United States. When it returned to number 1 for a nineteenth week on the chart, it tied Lil Nas X's "Old Town Road" featuring Billy Ray Cyrus, and Shaboozey's "A Bar Song (Tipsy)" for the longest running chart-topper overall on the Hot 100. It broke the tie on the chart dated December 20, 2025, when it topped the Hot 100 for a 20th total week, becoming the longest-running number one single; this was the second time Carey had set this record after "One Sweet Day" previously held it from 1996 to 2019. When the song topped the Hot 100 for a 21st week on the chart dated December 27, 2025, Carey earned her record-extending hundredth total week at number one, becoming the first artist to do so. Additionally, "All I Want for Christmas Is You" became the longest-running charting song on the Hot 100 by a woman (and the seventh overall), spending a total of 78 weeks on the chart. The song extended its record to 22 cumulative weeks the following week. In September 2026, Ella Langley's "Choosin' Texas" broke the record by spending 23 weeks at number one.

Of songs recorded before the year 2000, it is the best-selling digital single by a woman, as well as the overall best-selling holiday digital single. As of December 2019, total sales of the digital track according to Nielsen SoundScan was 3,588,000. On December 3, 2021, "All I Want for Christmas is You" was certified Diamond by the RIAA for selling 10 million units, becoming the first holiday song to achieve this, and making Carey the second female artist to have both a Diamond-certified single and album, following Taylor Swift. By December 20, 2021, the song has upped its U.S. totals to 4.3 billion in radio audience, 1.4 billion streams and 3.7 million in download sales. On December 15, 2025, "All I Want for Christmas Is You" was certified 18× Platinum by the RIAA.

As of the issue dated January 3, 2026, it has topped the Billboard Holiday 100 chart for a record seventy-one cumulative weeks, of the chart's seventy-nine total weeks since the seasonal list launched in 2011; it has topped the tally for forty-three consecutive weeks during the holidays from 2015 to 2023, when the streak was broken by Brenda Lee's "Rockin' Around the Christmas Tree". No other song has spent more than three weeks at No. 1 on the Holiday 100 since the chart's launch in 2011. On November 18, 2021, it was ranked as the #1 Greatest Holiday 100 Song of All Time by Billboard.

In Canada, "All I Want for Christmas is You" topped the Canadian Hot 100 chart for the first time, on the issue dated January 5, 2019, becoming the first Christmas song to top the charts and giving Carey her eleventh number 1 song in the country, and her first since "Heartbreaker" (1999), and her first chart-topping song on the Hot 100 era. Since then, it returned to the number 1 spot for five consecutive years (from 2020 to 2025), spending sixteen weeks on top. "All I Want for Christmas is You" remains Carey's best-selling single in Canada, as it was certified Diamond in the country, becoming Carey's first song to reach that status.

=== Europe ===
In the United Kingdom, the song entered the UK Singles Chart at number 5 during the week of December 10, 1994. The following week, the song peaked at number 2, staying there for the final three weeks of December (held out of the coveted "Christmas No. 1" honor by East 17's "Stay Another Day"). The song ended as the 12th best-selling single of 1994 in the UK. As of January 27, 2017, it had spent seventy-eight weeks on the UK Singles Chart. As of December 19, 2013, "All I Want for Christmas Is You" has sold one million copies in the UK. On December 26, 2025, the song was certified ten-times Platinum by the British Phonographic Industry for shipment of 6 million units (including streams), marking Carey's best-selling single in the UK and the highest-certified song by a female artist in the country. In 2010, it was named the number 1 Christmas song of the decade in the United Kingdom. The song peaked at number 2 in the United Kingdom for a second time in December 2017 and reached number 2 again in 2018 and 2019. By 2020, "All I Want for Christmas Is You" had sold 1.24 million copies in pure sales in the United Kingdom. It topped the UK Singles Chart for the first time ever on December 11, 2020, 26 years after its initial release. The song also set an Official Chart record, reaching number 1 in its seventieth week in the Top 40; no other song in UK chart history has spent more weeks in the Top 40 before reaching number 1. As of 2021, "All I Want for Christmas is You" is Carey's most-streamed song in the United Kingdom, and as the most-streamed Christmas song in the UK with 248 million streams. As of 2022, "All I Want for Christmas is You" became the 21st most-streamed song in the United Kingdom and had sold over 4 million units, including 1.26 million pure sales. The song returned to the number 1 spot on December 9, 2022, spending a third week atop the UK Singles chart. As of 2024, "All I Want For Christmas is You" became the second most-streamed song by a female artist in the UK, only behind Tones and I's "Dance Monkey". The song peaked at number 3 in 2025.

"All I Want For Christmas Is You" remains Carey's biggest hit and best-selling single in Europe, enjoying massive success across the continent, especially in German-speaking countries, as the song holds the record for the longest running number 1 single in Germany and Austria, spending twenty-two and nineteen weeks at number 1, respectively; while in Switzerland, with twenty-two weeks at number 1, it became the second-longest chart-topping song in the country, only behind Alex Warren's "Ordinary", which spent twenty-five weeks atop. Elsewhere, the song also topped the charts for fifteen weeks in the Netherlands; eleven weeks in the Czech Republic; ten weeks in Sweden, Hungary and Norway; nine weeks in Italy and Slovakia; seven weeks in Iceland and Greece; six weeks in Croatia and Luxembourg; five weeks in Latvia and Portugal; four weeks in Lithuania; three weeks in France; two weeks in Belgium, Denmark and Finland; and one week in Slovenia. It also reached number 2 in Ireland, Poland and Scotland; number 3 in Estonia and Spain; number 4 in North Macedonia; number 5 in Malta; and number 8 in Romania; while it peaked at number 22 in Ukraine.

The song was certified 11× Platinum in Sweden; 6× Platinum in Denmark; 5× Platinum in Italy; 4× Platinum in Norway and Spain; 3× Platinum in Portugal; 2× Platinum in Greece; and Gold in Belgium.

=== Oceania ===
The song originally peaked at number 2 on the ARIA Singles Chart in 1994, and was certified 13× Platinum by the Australian Recording Industry Association (ARIA), denoting shipments of over 910,000 units. Following the inclusion of streams in the ARIA charts, "All I Want For Christmas Is You" topped the chart in December 2018, becoming the first Christmas song to do so in Australia since "Snoopy's Christmas" by the Royal Guardsmen in 1967. It gave Carey her third number 1 song in the country after "Fantasy" in 1995 and "We Belong Together" in 2005, and made her the eleventh act to top the country's charts in three back-to-back decades.

The song also topped the charts in New Zealand for the first time in December 2018, making Carey's eighth number 1 single in the country, and her first since "Heartbreaker" in 1999. The song returned to the top spot in 2019, 2022 and 2023, spending four weeks on top.

=== Asia ===
In Japan, "All I Want for Christmas Is You" was released under the regional title "Koibito-tachi no Christmas" (恋人たちのクリスマス; lit. "Lovers' Christmas") and became Carey's best-selling single in the country. It was used as the theme song to the popular drama 29-sai no Christmas (29才のクリスマス; lit. "Christmas at 29 Years Old, 29th Christmas"), The single peaked at number 2 for two weeks, blocked from the top spot by "Tomorrow Never Knows" and "Everybody Goes", both released by the rock band Mr. Children. It sold in excess of 1.1 million units in Japan, becoming one of the best-selling singles by Western artists. Due to strong sales and airplay, the song re-charted in Japan in 2010, peaking at number 6 on the Japan Hot 100. The single has been certified the Million award by the Recording Industry Association of Japan (RIAJ) on two different formats (compact disc and ringtone), in 1994 and 2008, respectively.

Elsewhere in Asia, the song topped the charts in Singapore and the United Arab Emirates, becoming Carey's first number 1 single in both countries. It also reached number 2 in South Korea; and entered the top-ten in Lebanon, Malaysia and the Philippines; and the Top 40 in Hong Kong, Taiwan and Vietnam.

=== Africa ===
"All I Want for Christmas Is You" also experienced success in Africa. In South Africa, it reached number 1, becoming Carey's first chart-topping song in the country; while in Nigeria, it entered the Top 40, peaking at number 35.

=== South America ===
"All I Want for Christmas Is You" also became a success in Latin America, where it reached number 52 on the Brasil Hot 100 chart and number 54 on the Argentina Hot 100 chart. It also charted highly in Chile, Peru and Ecuador.

== Remixes ==
When the song was first released as a single in 1994, no remixes were commissioned. Carey re-released the song commercially in Japan in 2000, with a new remix known as the So So Def remix. The remix contains new vocals and is played over a harder, more urban beat that contains a sample of Afrika Bambaataa & the Soulsonic Force's "Planet Rock;" it features guest vocals by Jermaine Dupri and Bow Wow. The remix appears on Carey's compilation album Greatest Hits (2001) as a bonus track. A video was created for the So So Def remix, but it does not feature Carey or the hip-hop musicians that perform in the song. Instead, the video is animated and based on a scene in the video from Carey's "Heartbreaker" (1999). It features cartoon cameo appearances by Carey, Jermaine Dupri, Bow Wow, Luis Miguel (Carey's boyfriend at the time), Carey's dog Jack, and Santa Claus. In 2009 and 2010, the song was included in a music video accompanying ESPN's (and their sister station, ABC) Christmas Day coverage of the National Basketball Association (NBA).

In 2009, a remix produced by Carey and Low Sunday, called "Mariah's New Dance Mix", was released. The mix laid the original 1994 vocals over new electronic instrumentation. The remix garnered a positive response. MTV's Kyle Anderson wrote that "it's difficult to improve perfection," but that the remix "does dress up the song in a disco thump that should make your office Christmas party 28 percent funkier than it was last year." Idolator's Becky Bain praised the song's catchiness.

In 2010, Carey re-recorded the song for her thirteenth studio and second holiday album, Merry Christmas II You. Titled "All I Want for Christmas Is You (Extra Festive)", the new version featured re-recorded vocals, softer bell ringing and stronger drumming, and an orchestral introduction that replaced the slow vocal introduction. Steven J. Horowitz from Rap-Up wrote that the new version "sound[ed] just as enjoyable as it did in 1994." While the song was praised, it drew criticism for being too similar to the original. Thomas Connor from the Chicago Sun-Times wrote that the new version "just seems to add a few brassy backup singers to exactly the same arrangement." Caryn Ganz from Rolling Stone agreed, writing that it was "hard to figure out what's 'extra festive'" about the new version. Dan Hancox, editor of The National, also felt the new version was unnecessary.

== Live performances ==
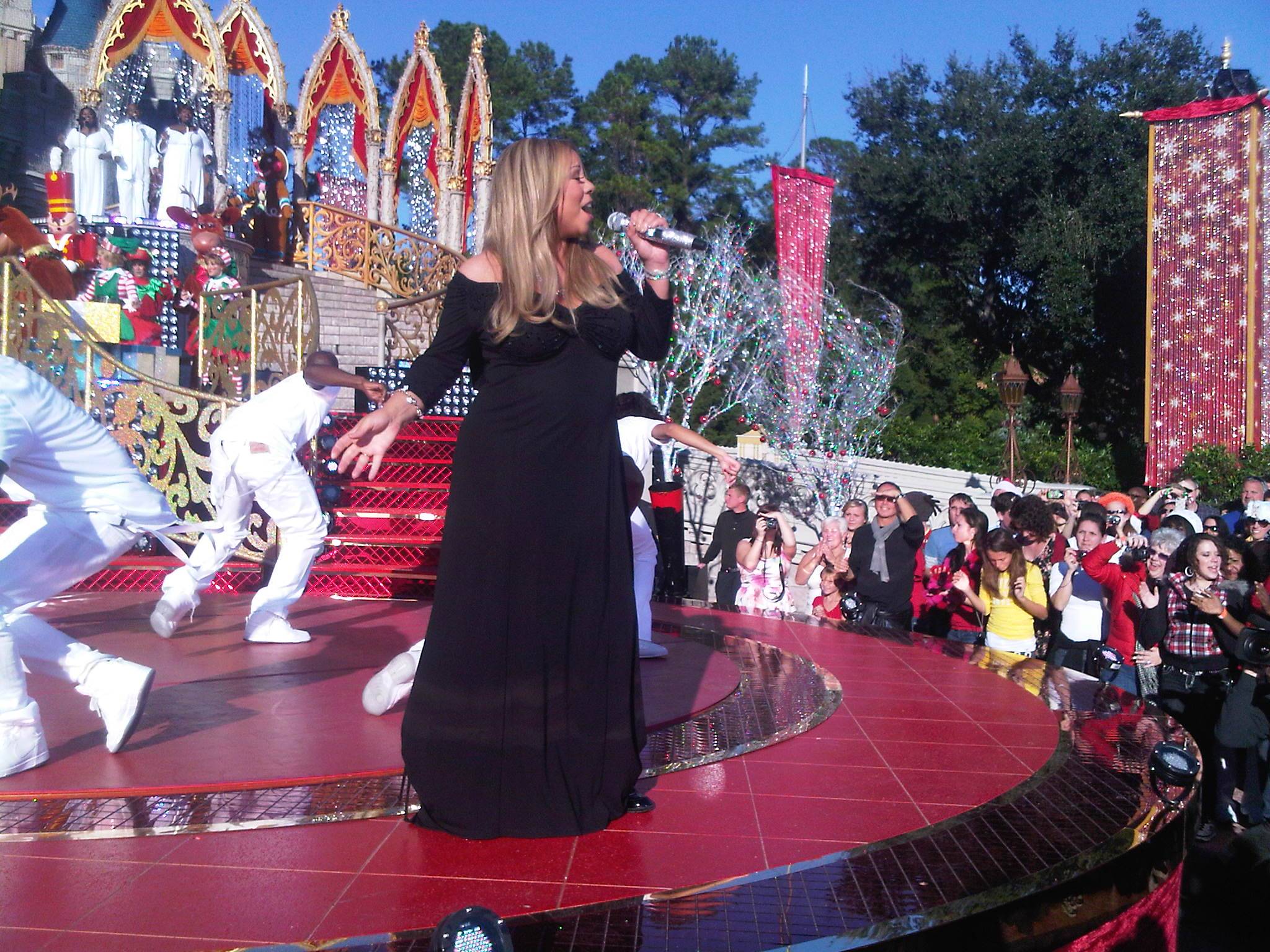
Carey performing the 2010 version of the song live at the Walt Disney World Resort in Orlando, Florida, on December 3, 2010

Carey has performed the song during concerts as well as live televised performances. It was part of the setlist of several of her concert tours, including the Japanese shows of Carey's Daydream World Tour (1996), Butterfly World Tour (1998), Rainbow World Tour (2000), Charmbracelet World Tour (2002–03), The Adventures of Mimi Tour (2006) and her concert residency All I Want For Christmas Is You, A Night of Joy & Festivity (various years).

The first performance of the song was at Cathedral of St. John the Divine, on December 8, 1994. Additionally, Carey performed the song at the 2004 Walt Disney World Christmas Day Parade, which aired on ABC. Carey sang the So So Def remix version at the opening night of her Angels Advocate Tour on New Year's Eve. On November 9, 2010, Carey taped a live Christmas Special featuring the song, which aired on December 13, 2010, on ABC. Additionally, Carey performed the song alongside "Oh Santa!" airing on ESPN and ABC throughout the day on Christmas Day of 2010. On December 3, 2010, she performed both songs at the Walt Disney World Resort theme park, Magic Kingdom, in a performance that was taped and aired part of the Walt Disney World Christmas Day Parade on ABC.

In 2012, Carey performed the song alongside Jimmy Fallon and the Roots on Late Night with Jimmy Fallon with the help of elementary school-style instruments. On December 18, 2013, Carey performed the song alongside Michael Bublé in his Christmas special via NBC. During The Late Late Show with James Corden on December 15, 2016, Mariah Carey sang the song on the popular feature Carpool Karaoke. Fellow singers Adele, Lady Gaga, Demi Lovato, Nick Jonas, Elton John, Selena Gomez, Gwen Stefani, Chris Martin and the band Red Hot Chili Peppers were featured in the video. In December 2019, Carey returned to The Late Late Show to perform the song for its 25th anniversary. In addition to this, she performed "Oh Santa!" and "Christmas Time Is in the Air Again". In 2020, Carey re-recorded and performed the song on her Christmas special. In 2022, Carey performed the song on her Merry Christmas to All! Christmas special.

== Music videos ==
The first, primary video for the song was shot in the style of a home movie using Super 8 film; it was directed and filmed by Carey during the Christmas season of 1993. The video begins with Carey decorating a Christmas tree with holiday ornaments and frolicking through a snowy mountainside. Outdoor scenes were shot at the Fairy Tale Forest in New Jersey, where Carey's then-husband Tommy Mottola made a cameo appearance as Santa Claus. It continues with scenes of Carey preparing for the Christmas season of 1994, getting ready for her album cover photo shoot and spending time with her dog Jack. It concludes with Santa Claus leaving Carey with a bag of presents and waving goodbye. In the song's alternate video, inspired by the Ronettes, Carey dances in a 1960s-influenced studio surrounded by go–go dancers. For a 1960s look, the video was filmed in black and white, with Carey in white boots and teased up hair. This video was also directed by Carey. There are two edits to this version of the video.

In 2019, along with the release of the deluxe 25th-anniversary edition of Merry Christmas, Carey released two new music videos for the song. The first featured unreleased footage of the original video. The second, directed by Joseph Kahn, was a "revamped" version titled "Make My Wish Come True Edition", with new scenes of Carey in 2019. In this video, Carey, now 50, is seen lip-syncing to her 25-year-old voice from 1994. A montage of celebrities lip-syncing the song was also released on Carey's Vevo channel that same year. Some celebrities featured in the video include Ryan Reynolds, Kim Kardashian, and James Corden.

== It's Time ==
In 2019, along with the release of the deluxe 25th-anniversary edition of Merry Christmas, Carey released a video called "It's Time" a day after Halloween to herald the arrival of Christmastime. It has since become an annual tradition, with Carey releasing a new video every year on November 1, which starts with her defrosting from ice followed by the tagline "It’s Time".

== Lawsuit ==
On June 3, 2022, songwriter Andy Stone from Vince Vance & the Valiants filed a copyright lawsuit against Carey, alleging that she "exploited" and made "undeserved profits" off his song, also titled "All I Want for Christmas Is You" and itself a Christmas standard, which was written five years prior to Carey's version. Despite sharing the same title, the two songs were musically different. On November 2, 2022, Stone dropped his lawsuit, but in November 2023, the lawsuit was refiled. The case was moved to California from Louisiana. In March 2025, Carey won the lawsuit in Los Angeles. Andy Stone and Troy Powers were ordered to pay part of Carey's attorneys' fees, as some of their filings contained a "litany of irrelevant and unsupported factual assertions."

== Legacy ==
=== Cultural impact ===
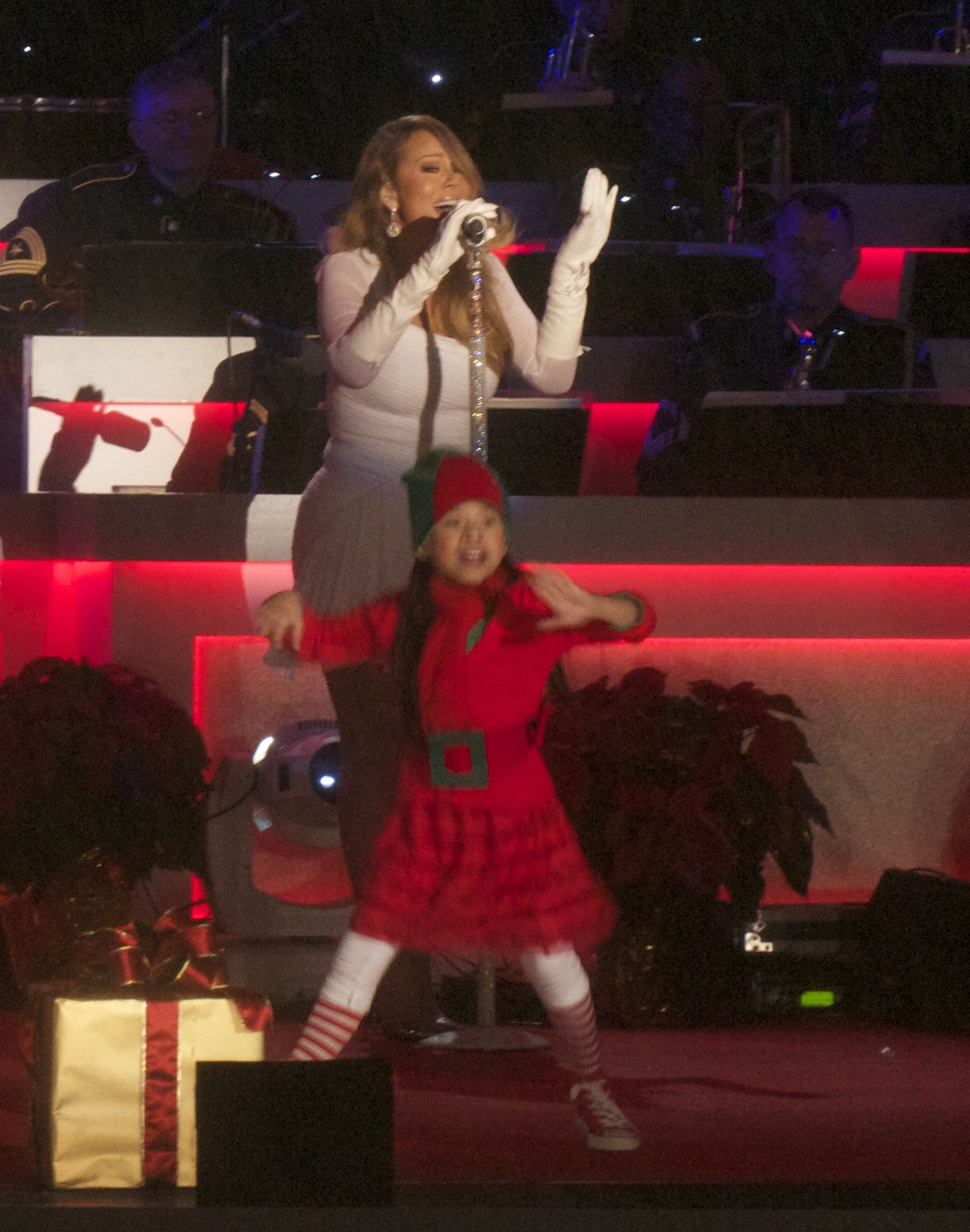
Carey performing "All I Want for Christmas Is You" at the National Christmas Tree Lighting ceremony near the White House on December 6, 2013

Due to the song's lasting impact, Carey has been dubbed the "Queen of Christmas". Carey has taken advantage of the song's popularity and her honorific title by posting a video every year since 2019, around midnight Eastern time on November 1, saying when it is officially time to play the song. As of 2023, the Associated Press estimates the song's royalty earnings at $100 million, and The Economist estimating that Carey personally makes $2.5 million per year from this song alone. The song has been described as a "yuletide tune" by Forbes, who went on to say that the song has "become debatably the unofficial song of Christmas each year". Time writer Cady Lang stated that there are multiple reasons for the song's popularity, the first being the "powerhouse vocals of the beloved elusive chanteuse." She also noted the song's impact on pop culture stating that it is "a reminder that pop music, and maybe especially Christmas-themed pop music, can be as transportive for the singer (and the songwriter) as it is for the listener".

The popularity of "All I Want for Christmas Is You" is noteworthy, not merely in its staying power (although a quarter of a century at the forefront of the holiday genre is a flex, if there ever was one) or its momentum in gaining ubiquity year after year, but in its ability to command the category over a period in which her industry and the culture has evolved significantly.

Los Angeles Times writer Jody Rosen noted that the song's success reflects "the zeal of Carey's super-fans" and "speaks to the character of the song itself: its timeless quality, the way it seems to hover between musical eras and idioms. The song's harmonic palate, its diminished chords and lustrous chromatic passages, call to mind the jazz-inflected Christmas hits of the midcentury [...] Carey's calisthenic vocals, combining gospel-style melismatic runs and subtly funky syncopations, are unmistakably 90s, redolent of hip-hop-influenced R&B that Carey herself helped pioneer." Rosen went on to call it the 21st century's "White Christmas" calling Carey "another hall of fame vocalist and showbiz giant who was indelibly associated with the holiday".

The Ringer writer Rob Harvilla stated that "December belongs to Mariah Carey". He went on to say that "the very first time you [hear the song, it sounds] classic [...] timeless, like it was playing in the manger when Jesus Christ was born." Critics also noted the song was reminiscent of the works of Judy Garland, Nat King Cole, the Jackson 5 and Stevie Wonder. Slate's Ragusea conceded that "All I Want For Christmas Is You" "sounds like it could have been written in the '40s and locked in a Brill Building safe." In a piece on the song in Vogue, a writer felt the song's lyrics helped solidify its status over two decades later: "those lyrics could have been sung by Frank Sinatra—well, maybe not Frank, but another singer back then. I think that's what gives it that timeless, classic quality."

"All I Want for Christmas is You" was selected by the Library of Congress for preservation in the National Recording Registry in 2023, based on its "cultural, historical or aesthetic importance in the nation's recorded sound heritage."

The song is popular among radio stations that switch formats to all-Christmas to use as a "kickoff song" to launch the seasonal format, amplified in part due to Carey's annual November 1 videos. Of a sample of 20 stations that changed to the format before Veterans Day in 2024, five chose the song, tied with "It's the Most Wonderful Time of the Year."

Radio writer Sean Ross in 2020, and former program director Rob Lucas (who programmed all-Christmas Star 102.5 from 2001 to 2022) in 2023, both noted that the popularity of the song, and its similarity to the arrangements on the seminal Christmas album A Christmas Gift for You from Phil Spector, had essentially established the Wall of Sound-type stylings as a fixture of contemporary Christmas music. Ross suggested that the vast majority of new Christmas records that were breaking through now had a sound reminiscent of Carey or Spector, making programming the format to avoid over-repetition more difficult.

=== Achievements ===
On December 25, 2018, the song set the single-day record for the most Spotify streams, with 10.82 million plays. As of December 2019, the song has earned more than $2 million in royalties since it was first added to Spotify. On November 24, 2019, the song won three records in Guinness World Records for one of the best-selling and most recognizable Christmas songs, most streamed song on Spotify in 24 hours (female) (10,819,009 streams in December 2018) and most weeks in the UK singles Top 10 chart for a Christmas song (20) titles. In 2022, "the song broke for a fourth time the all-time record for the most streamed song in a single day on Spotify with 21.2 million global streams, a record previously held by Adele's "Easy on Me", becoming the first song to be streamed over 20 million times in 24 hours.

In 2010, The Daily Telegraph named "All I Want for Christmas Is You" the most popular and most played Christmas song of the decade in the United Kingdom. Rolling Stone ranked it fourth on its Greatest Rock and Roll Christmas Songs list, calling it a "holiday standard". In a UK-wide poll in December 2012, it was voted fifth on the ITV television special The Nation's Favourite Christmas Song. In 2018, The Washington Post ranked the song sixth on its ranking of 100 best Christmas songs. In 2019, The Guardian writer Michael Hann ranked the song number 1 on his list of the 50 greatest Christmas songs, calling it a "rare modern Christmas song that has become a standard." In November 2021, Billboard named "All I Want for Christmas Is You" the Greatest Holiday Song of All Time. The song reached one billion streams on Spotify in December 2021 and two billion streams in December 2024, making it the first holiday song to achieve both milestones.

=== Adaptations ===
Carey released a children's book based on "All I Want for Christmas Is You" on November 10, 2015, which went on to sell over 750,000 copies. She released an animated family film titled Mariah Carey's All I Want for Christmas Is You, based upon the book and song, on November 14, 2017. Lacey Chabert, Henry Winkler and Breanna Yde were attached to the film. Carey was the executive producer of the film alongside Stella Bulochnikov for Magic Carpet Productions, in partnership with producer Mike Young and Splash Entertainment.

== Track listings ==
- Mariah's New Dance Mixes EP
1. "All I Want for Christmas Is You" (Mariah's New Dance Mix)
2. "All I Want for Christmas Is You" (Mariah's New Dance Mix Edit)
3. "All I Want for Christmas Is You" (Mariah's New Dance Mix Edit Extended)
- All I Want for Christmas Is You / Joy to the World EP
1. "All I Want for Christmas Is You"
2. "All I Want for Christmas Is You" (So So Def Remix feat. Lil' Bow Wow & Jermaine Dupri)
3. "Joy to the World"
4. "Joy to the World" (Celebration Mix Edit)
- 30th anniversary Japanese limited edition cassette single
1. "All I Want for Christmas Is You"
2. "All I Want for Christmas Is You" (Live at the Tokyo Dome)
- 30th anniversary Japanese limited edition CD maxi single
1. "All I Want for Christmas Is You"
2. "All I Want for Christmas Is You" (So So Def Remix feat. Jermaine Dupri & Lil' Bow Wow)
3. "Christmas Time Is in the Air Again" (Magical Christmas Mix)
4. "Christmas Wrapping" (feat. Roe) [Live at Madison Square Garden]
5. "Miss You Most (At Christmas Time)" (Video Version)
6. "Joy to the World" (Celebration Mix)
7. "All I Want for Christmas Is You" (Live at the Tokyo Dome)
- 30th Anniversary European Reissue 12 Inch Vinyl
1. "All I Want for Christmas Is You"
2. "Oh Santa!" (feat. Ariana Grande and Jennifer Hudson)
3. "The Star"
4. "Christmas Wrapping" (feat. Roe) [Live at Madison Square Garden]
5. "Miss You Most (At Christmas Time)" (Video Version)
6. "Fall In Love At Christmas" (feat. Khalid and Kirk Franklin)
7. "Joy to the World" (Celebration Mix)
- 30th Anniversary 12 Inch Vinyl Single (D2C Exclusive Limited Edition) (Album artwork contains Mariah smiling and posing in Santa's sleigh)
1. "All I Want for Christmas Is You"
2. "Oh Santa!" (feat. Ariana Grande and Jennifer Hudson)
3. "Miss You Most (At Christmas Time)" (Video Version)
- 30th Anniversary 7 Inch Vinyl Single (D2C Exclusive Limited Edition) (Album artwork contains Mariah smiling, staring into the camera whilst squatting on a white rug)
1. "All I Want for Christmas Is You"
2. "Sleigh Ride"
- 30th Anniversary CD Single (D2C Exclusive Limited Edition) (Album artwork contains Mariah smiling, eyes closed whilst squatting on a white rug)
1. "All I Want for Christmas Is You"
2. "Christmas Wrapping" (feat. Roe) [Live at Madison Square Garden]
3. "Miss You Most (At Christmas Time)" (Video Version)
- 10 Inch Vinyl EP with Picture Disc (Album artwork contains an animated Mariah with a dark blue backdrop)
1. "All I Want for Christmas Is You"
2. "All I Want for Christmas Is You" (So So Def Remix feat. Jermaine Dupri & Lil' Bow Wow)
3. "Joy to the World"
4. "Joy to the World" (Celebration Mix)

== Credits and personnel ==
- Recorded at The Hit Factory (New York City)
- Mixed at Sony Music Studios (New York City)
- Mastered at Gateway Mastering (Portland, Maine)
- Mariah Carey – Lyricist, composer, producer, arranger
- Walter Afanasieff – Composer, producer, arranger, keyboards, synth bass, drum and rhythm programming
- Dann Huff – guitars
- Gary Cirimelli – Macintosh, digital and synth programming
- Dan Shea – additional programming
- Melonie Daniels – background vocals
- Shanrae Price – background vocals
- Kelly Price – background vocals
- Dana Jon Chappelle – music engineering
- Jay Healy – vocal engineering
- Mick Guzauski – mixing
- Gus Garces – second engineering
- Andy Smith – second engineering
- Mike Scott – second engineering
- David Gleeson – second engineering
- Bob Ludwig – mastering

== Charts ==
=== Weekly charts ===
==== Original version ====
Weekly chart performance
Chart (1994–1996)	Peak position
Australia (ARIA)	2
Belgium (Ultratop 50 Flanders)	5
Canada Contemporary Hit Radio (The Record)	61
Europe (Eurochart Hot 100)	4
Europe (European AC Radio Top 25)	6
Europe (European Dance Radio)	13
Europe (European Hit Radio)	2
Germany (GfK)	24
Iceland (Íslenski Listinn Topp 40)	14
Israel (Israeli Singles Chart)	1
Italy (Musica e Dischi)	17
Japan (Oricon)	2
Netherlands (Dutch Top 40)	5
Netherlands (Single Top 100)	5
New Zealand (Recorded Music NZ)	4
Scottish Singles Sales (Official Charts)	2
Sweden (Sverigetopplistan)	17
UK Singles (Official Charts)	2
UK Hip Hop/R&B (Official Charts)	1
UK Airplay (Music Week)	3
US Hot 100 Airplay (Billboard)	12
US Adult Contemporary (Billboard)	6
US Adult Pop Airplay (Billboard)	27
US Pop Airplay (Billboard)	9
US Rhythmic Airplay (Billboard)	14
US Cash Box Top 100	88

Weekly chart performance
Chart (2000–2026)	Peak position
Argentina Hot 100 (Billboard)	54
Australia (ARIA)	1
Austria (Ö3 Austria Top 40)	1
Belarus Airplay (TopHit)	72
Belgium (Ultratop 50 Flanders)	1
Belgium (Ultratop 50 Wallonia)	1
Brazil Hot 100 (Billboard)	48
Canada Hot 100 (Billboard)	1
Chile (Billboard)	7
CIS Airplay (TopHit)	23
Croatia (Billboard)	2
Croatia International Airplay (Top lista)	1
Croatia Christmas International Airplay (Top lista)	4
Czech Republic Airplay (ČNS IFPI)	8
Czech Republic Singles Digital (ČNS IFPI)	1
Denmark (Tracklisten)	1
Ecuador (Billboard)	13
Estonia (Eesti Tipp-40)	3
Estonia Airplay (TopHit)	18
Finland (Suomen virallinen lista)	1
France (SNEP)	1
Germany (GfK)	1
Global 200 (Billboard)	1
Greece International Streaming (IFPI)	1
Hong Kong (Billboard)	9
Hungary (Rádiós Top 40)	26
Hungary (Single Top 40)	1
Hungary (Stream Top 40)	1
Iceland (Tónlistinn)	1
Ireland (IRMA)	2
Italy (FIMI)	1
Jamaica Airplay (JAMMS)	8
Japan Hot 100 (Billboard)	6
Japan Combined Singles (Oricon)	15
Latvia Airplay (LaIPA)	16
Latvia Streaming (LaIPA)	1
Lebanon (Lebanese Top 20)	10
Lithuania (AGATA)	1
Luxembourg (Billboard)	1
Malaysia Streaming (RIM)	9
Malta Airplay (Radiomonitor)	5
Middle East and North Africa (IFPI)	10
Moldova Airplay (TopHit)	15
Netherlands (Single Top 100)	1
New Zealand (Recorded Music NZ)	1
Nigeria (TurnTable Top 100)	26
North Macedonia Airplay (Radiomonitor)	4
Norway (VG-lista)	1
Peru (Billboard)	11
Philippines (IFPI)	7
Philippines Hot 100 (Billboard Philippines)	10
Poland Airplay (ZPAV)	7
Poland (Polish Streaming Top 100)	2
Portugal (AFP)	1
Romania (Billboard)	8
Russia Airplay (TopHit)	111
Russia Streaming (TopHit)	52
Singapore (RIAS)	1
Slovakia Airplay (ČNS IFPI)	9
Slovakia Singles Digital (ČNS IFPI)	1
Slovenia Airplay (SloTop50)	1
South Africa Airplay (TOSAC)	1
South Africa Streaming (TOSAC)	1
South Korea (Circle)	2
South Korea (K-pop Hot 100)	52
Spain (Promusicae)	3
Sweden (Sverigetopplistan)	1
Switzerland (Schweizer Hitparade)	1
Taiwan (Billboard)	12
Ukraine Airplay (TopHit)	20
United Arab Emirates (IFPI)	1
UK Singles (Official Charts)	1
US Billboard Hot 100	1
US Dance Singles Sales (Billboard)	2
US Holiday 100 (Billboard)	1
US Hot R&B/Hip-Hop Singles Sales (Billboard)	1
US Rolling Stone Top 100	1
Vietnam (Vietnam Hot 100)	25

==== Extra Festive version ====
Weekly chart performance
Chart (2010–2021)	Peak position
Canada Digital Song Sales (Billboard)	30
Canada AC (Billboard)	35
South Korea (Circle)	82
US Digital Song Sales (Billboard)	35
US Holiday 100 (Billboard)	80

==== Live at the Tokyo Dome ====
Weekly chart performance
Chart (2020)	Peak position
US Holiday Digital Songs (Billboard)	18

==== Magical Christmas Mix ====
Weekly chart performance
Chart (2020)	Peak position
US Holiday Digital Songs (Billboard)	25

==== 30th anniversary ====
Weekly chart performance
Chart (2024)	Peak position
Belgian Albums (Ultratop Flanders) 12-inch vinyl	194

=== Monthly charts ===
Monthly chart performance
Chart (2023–2025)	Peak position
CIS Airplay (TopHit)	29
Estonia Airplay (TopHit)	28
Lithuania Airplay (TopHit)	6
Moldova Airplay (TopHit)	54
Romania Airplay (TopHit)	55
Russia Streaming (TopHit)	60
Ukraine Airplay (TopHit)	39

=== Year-end charts ===
Year-end chart performance
Chart (1994)	Position
UK Singles (OCC)	12

Year-end chart performance
Chart (1995)	Position
Israel (Israeli Singles Chart)	25

Chart (2006)	Position
UK Singles (OCC)	142

Chart (2007)	Position
UK Singles (OCC)	99

Chart (2010)	Position
Sweden (Sverigetopplistan)	98

Chart (2011)	Position
UK Singles (OCC)	195

Chart (2014)	Position
Hungary (Single Top 40)	67

Chart (2015)	Position
Hungary (Single Top 40)	82

Chart (2016)	Position
Hungary (Single Top 40)	53
South Korea (Gaon)	98

Chart (2017)	Position
Hungary (Single Top 40)	44

Chart (2018)	Position
Hungary (Single Top 40)	25
Netherlands Airplay (Airplay Top 40)	99

Chart (2019)	Position
Austria (Ö3 Austria Top 40)	64
Hungary (Single Top 40)	22
Hungary (Stream Top 40)	75
UK Singles (OCC)	84

Chart (2020)	Position
Austria (Ö3 Austria Top 40)	71
Canada (Canadian Hot 100)	72
Hungary (Single Top 40)	22
Hungary (Stream Top 40)	60
Switzerland (Schweizer Hitparade)	73
UK Singles (OCC)	53
US Billboard Hot 100	67

Chart (2021)	Position
Austria (Ö3 Austria Top 40)	69
Canada (Canadian Hot 100)	71
Denmark (Tracklisten)	83
Germany (GfK)	52
Global 200 (Billboard)	90
Hungary (Single Top 40)	28
Hungary (Stream Top 40)	62
South Korea (Gaon)	164
Switzerland (Schweizer Hitparade)	86
UK Singles (OCC)	37
US Billboard Hot 100	78

Chart (2022)	Position
Canada (Canadian Hot 100)	71
Denmark (Tracklisten)	79
Germany (GfK)	71
Global 200 (Billboard)	88
Hungary (Single Top 40)	25
Hungary (Stream Top 40)	62
Netherlands (Single Top 100)	85
Sweden (Sverigetopplistan)	90
Switzerland (Schweizer Hitparade)	61
UK Singles (OCC)	36
US Billboard Hot 100	65

Chart (2023)	Position
Austria (Ö3 Austria Top 40)	74
Canada (Canadian Hot 100)	57
Denmark (Tracklisten)	78
Germany (GfK)	50
Global 200 (Billboard)	95
Hungary (Single Top 40)	34
Netherlands (Single Top 100)	88
Sweden (Sverigetopplistan)	89
Switzerland (Schweizer Hitparade)	64
UK Singles (OCC)	29
US Billboard Hot 100	55

Chart (2024)	Position
Austria (Ö3 Austria Top 40)	32
Canada (Canadian Hot 100)	60
Denmark (Tracklisten)	96
Germany (GfK)	48
Global 200 (Billboard)	98
Switzerland (Schweizer Hitparade)	57
UK Singles (OCC)	50
US Billboard Hot 100	54

Chart (2025)	Position
Austria (Ö3 Austria Top 40)	49
Canada (Canadian Hot 100)	79
Germany (GfK)	28
Global 200 (Billboard)	93
Switzerland (Schweizer Hitparade)	49
UK Singles (OCC)	82
US Billboard Hot 100	59

=== Decade-end charts ===
Decade-end chart performance
Chart (2000–2009)	Position
Austria (Ö3 Austria Top 40)	7
UK Holiday Songs	1

Chart (2010–2019)	Position
UK Singles (OCC)	77

=== All-time charts ===
All-time chart performance
Chart	Position
UK Singles (OCC)	82
US Holiday 100 (Billboard)	1

== Certifications and sales ==
Certifications and sales
Region	Certification	Certified units/sales
Australia (ARIA)	13× Platinum	910,000^{‡}
Belgium (BRMA)	Gold	10,000^{‡}
Brazil (Pro-Música Brasil)	Platinum	60,000^{‡}
Canada (Music Canada)	Diamond	800,000^{‡}
Denmark (IFPI Danmark)	7× Platinum	630,000^{‡}
Germany (BVMI)	7× Gold	2,100,000^{‡}
Italy (FIMI)	5× Platinum	500,000^{‡}
Japan (RIAJ) Physical sales	Million	1,100,000
Japan (RIAJ) 2004 release	2× Platinum	500,000^{*}
Japan (RIAJ) 2010 release	Gold	100,000^{*}
Japan (RIAJ) 2002 release, Chak-Uta (R)	2× Platinum	500,000^{*}
New Zealand (RMNZ)	6× Platinum	180,000^{‡}
Norway (IFPI Norway)	4× Platinum	240,000^{‡}
Portugal (AFP)	4× Platinum	100,000^{‡}
South Korea (Gaon)	—	988,179
Spain (Promusicae)	4× Platinum	240,000^{‡}
United Kingdom (BPI)	10× Platinum	6,000,000^{‡}
United States (RIAA)	18× Platinum	18,000,000^{‡}
United States (RIAA) Mastertone	2× Platinum	2,000,000^{*}
Streaming
Greece (IFPI Greece)	3× Platinum	6,000,000^{†}
Japan (RIAJ)	Platinum	100,000,000^{†}
Sweden (GLF)	11× Platinum	88,000,000^{†}
^{*} Sales figures based on certification alone.^{‡} Sales+streaming figures based on certification alone.^{†} Streaming-only figures based on certification alone.

== Release history ==
Release dates and formats
Region	Date	Format(s)	Version(s)	Label(s)	Ref.
Japan	October 29, 1994	Mini CD single	Original	Sony Music Japan	
Australia	November 14, 1994	CD single; Cassette single	Original	Columbia	
United States	November 14, 1994	Adult contemporary radio; contemporary hit radio	Original	Columbia	
Europe	November 28, 1994	CD single	Original	Columbia	
United Kingdom	November 28, 1994	12-inch vinyl single; CD single; cassette single	Original	Columbia	
United Kingdom	December 5, 1994	Picture disc CD single	Original	Columbia	
Japan	September 21, 1995	Mini CD single	Original	Sony Music Japan	
Japan	November 21, 1996	CD single	Original	Sony Music Japan	
United States	November 27, 2007	Ringle	Original	Legacy	
Various	November 20, 2009	Digital download	Dance remix	Sony	
Europe	December 15, 2017	Digital download	Original	Columbia	
Various	December 20, 2019	7-inch vinyl	Original	Columbia; Epic; Legacy	
Various	December 20, 2019	Cassette single	Original	Columbia; Epic; Legacy	
Various	December 20, 2019	12-inch vinyl	Original; Live 1994; So So Def remix; Dance remix	Columbia; Epic; Legacy	
Various	December 20, 2019	CD single	Original; Live 1994; So So Def remix; Dance remix	Columbia; Epic; Legacy	
United States	February 2020	CD single	Original; Live 1994; So So Def remix; Dance remix	Columbia; Epic; Legacy	
Japan	November 27, 2024	Cassette single	Original; Live 1996	Sony Music Japan	
Japan	November 27, 2024	CD maxi single	Original; So So Def remix; Live 1996	Sony Music Japan	

== Other versions ==
=== Mariah Carey and Justin Bieber version ===
"All I Want for Christmas Is You (SuperFestive!)"

Single by Mariah Carey and Justin Bieber

from the album Under the Mistletoe
- Released: December 9, 2011
- Studio: Henson Recording Studios (Los Angeles, CA); Westlake Recording Studios (Los Angeles, CA); Guardian Angel Studios (Bel Air, CA); Capitol Studios (Los Angeles, CA); The Dugout (Los Angeles, CA); Jungle City Studios (New York, NY)
- Genre: Christmas; pop; R&B
- Length: 4:00
- Label: Island
- Songwriters: Mariah Carey; Walter Afanasieff
- Producers: Mariah Carey; James "Big Jim" Wright; Randy Jackson; Kuk Harrell

Mariah Carey singles chronology
"When Christmas Comes" (2011)	"All I Want for Christmas Is You (SuperFestive!)" (2011)	"Triumphant (Get 'Em)" (2012)

Justin Bieber singles chronology
"Mistletoe" (2011)	"All I Want for Christmas Is You (SuperFestive!)" (2011)	"Live My Life" (2012)

Music video
- "All I Want for Christmas Is You (SuperFestive!)" on YouTube

"All I Want for Christmas Is You (SuperFestive!)" is a duet between Carey and Canadian singer Justin Bieber. The song was recorded on his holiday album, Under the Mistletoe (2011), and released through radio in Italy on December 9, 2011, as the second single from the album. The music video for the duet was filmed in Macy's department store in New York City, and features Bieber shopping with his friends whilst Carey is seen singing in the background.

==== Weekly charts ====
Weekly chart performance
Chart (2011–2024)	Peak position
Belgium (Ultratip Bubbling Under Flanders)	35
Canada Hot 100 (Billboard)	61
Canada AC (Billboard)	16
Hungary (Rádiós Top 40)	28
Japan Hot 100 (Billboard)	19
Lithuania Airplay (TopHit)	1
Norway (VG-lista)	2
South Korea (K-pop Hot 100)	47
South Korea International (Gaon)	29
Spain (Promusicae)	34
UK Singles (OCC)	148
US Billboard Hot 100	86
US Adult Contemporary (Billboard)	3
US Holiday 100 (Billboard)	20

==== Monthly charts ====
Monthly chart performance
Chart (2024)	Peak position
Lithuania Airplay (TopHit)	15

==== All-time charts ====
All-time chart performance
Chart	Position
US Holiday 100 (Billboard)	99

==== Certifications and sales ====
Certifications and sales
Region	Certification	Certified units/sales
Australia (ARIA)	Gold	35,000^{‡}
Canada (Music Canada)	Platinum	80,000^{‡}
Denmark (IFPI Danmark)	Platinum	90,000^{‡}
South Korea	—	225,347
United States (RIAA)	Gold	500,000^{‡}
^{‡} Sales+streaming figures based on certification alone.

=== Big Time Rush version ===
"All I Want for Christmas"

Song by Big Time Rush

from the EP Holiday Bundle
- Released: November 30, 2010
- Length: 3:32
- Label: Nickelodeon; Columbia/Epic
- Songwriters: Mariah Carey; Walter Afanasieff

Audio video
- "All I Want for Christmas" on YouTube

American pop band Big Time Rush covered the song (under the shortened title "All I Want for Christmas") and released it in 2010 from their EP, Holiday Bundle.

==== Charts ====
Chart performance
Chart (2010)	Peak position
US Bubbling Under Hot 100 (Billboard)	24
US Holiday Digital Song Sales (Billboard)	30
US Kid Digital Songs (Billboard)	1
US Pop Digital Songs (Billboard)	44

=== Glee Cast version ===
"All I Want for Christmas Is You"

Single by Glee cast

from the album Glee: The Music, The Christmas Album Volume 2
- Released: November 11, 2011
- Recorded: 2011
- Genre: Pop
- Length: 4:03
- Label: Columbia
- Songwriters: Mariah Carey; Walter Afanasieff

Audio video
- "All I Want for Christmas Is You" on YouTube

The song was covered by the cast of Glee, led by Amber Riley, and was released in 2011 as a single as a part of the tracklist from the album Glee: The Music, The Christmas Album Volume 2. The song was featured in the season 3 Christmas episode "Extraordinary Merry Christmas".

==== Charts ====
Weekly chart performance
Chart (2011–2019)	Peak position
Canada Hot 100 (Billboard)	98
US Bubbling Under Hot 100 (Billboard)	18
US Holiday 100 (Billboard)	43

=== Michael Bublé version ===
"All I Want for Christmas Is You"

Single by Michael Bublé

from the album Christmas
- Released: November 16, 2011
- Recorded: 2011
- Studio: Capitol
- Genre: Pop
- Length: 2:51
- Label: 143; Reprise
- Songwriters: Mariah Carey; Walter Afanasieff

Michael Bublé singles chronology
"Don't Get Around Much Anymore" (2011)	"All I Want for Christmas Is You" (2011)	"Georgia on My Mind" (2012)

Audio video
- "All I Want for Christmas Is You" on YouTube

Canadian singer-songwriter Michael Bublé covered the song and released it on November 16, 2011, as the lead single from his Christmas album. The song entered the Billboard Hot 100, becoming the first time a cover version of the song appeared on the chart.

==== Weekly charts ====
Weekly chart performance
Chart (2011–2021)	Peak position
Australia (ARIA)	76
Canada AC (Billboard)	5
Croatia (HRT)	75
Finland (Suomen virallinen lista)	18
Finnish Airplay (Radiosoitto)	81
France (SNEP)	168
Germany (GfK)	80
Hungary (Rádiós Top 40)	37
Hungary (Single Top 40)	28
Hungary (Stream Top 40)	35
Italy (FIMI)	46
Japan Hot 100 (Billboard)	27
Netherlands (Single Top 100)	88
Sweden (Sverigetopplistan)	39
US Billboard Hot 100	99
US Adult Contemporary (Billboard)	1
US Holiday 100 (Billboard)	13

==== Year-end charts ====
Year-end chart performance
Chart (2012)	Position
US Adult Contemporary (Billboard)	33

==== All-time charts ====
All-time chart performance
Chart	Position
US Holiday 100 (Billboard)	52

==== Certifications and sales ====
Certifications and sales
Region	Certification	Certified units/sales
Denmark (IFPI Danmark)	Gold	45,000^{‡}
Italy (FIMI)	Gold	35,000^{‡}
New Zealand (RMNZ)	Gold	15,000^{‡}
United Kingdom (BPI)	Gold	400,000^{‡}
^{‡} Sales+streaming figures based on certification alone.

=== Fifth Harmony version ===
"All I Want for Christmas Is You"

Promotional single by Fifth Harmony

from the EP I'll Be Home for Christmas
- Released: November 17, 2014
- Length: 3:50
- Label: Syco; Epic
- Songwriters: Mariah Carey; Walter Afanasieff

Music video
- "All I Want for Christmas Is You" on YouTube

American girl group Fifth Harmony covered the song and released it in 2014 from the EP, I'll Be Home for Christmas.

==== Charts ====
Chart performance
Chart (2014)	Peak position
US Holiday 100 (Billboard)	71

== See also ==
- List of best-selling singles in Japan
- List of Billboard Global 200 number ones of 2020
- List of Billboard Global 200 number ones of 2021
- List of Billboard Global 200 number ones of 2022
- List of Billboard Global 200 number ones of 2023
- List of Billboard Global 200 number ones of 2024
- List of Billboard Hot 100 number ones of 2019
- List of Billboard Hot 100 number ones of 2020
- List of Billboard Hot 100 number ones of 2021
- List of Billboard Hot 100 number ones of 2022
- List of Billboard Hot 100 number ones of 2023
- List of Billboard Hot 100 number ones of 2024
- List of Billboard Hot 100 number ones of 2025
- List of Billboard Hot 100 top-ten singles in 2017
- List of Billboard Hot 100 top-ten singles in 2018
- List of highest-certified singles in Australia
- List of highest-certified digital singles in the United States
- List of number-one songs in Norway
- List of number-one singles from the 2010s (New Zealand)
- List of number-one singles from the 2020s (New Zealand)
- List of number-one singles of 2016 (Slovenia)
- List of number-one singles of 2018 (Australia)
- List of number-one singles of 2019 (Australia)
- List of number-one singles of 2020 (Australia)
- List of number-one singles of 2022 (Australia)
- List of number-one singles of 2023 (Australia)
- List of number-one singles of the 2010s (Sweden)
- List of number-one singles of the 2020s (Sweden)
- List of number-one hits of 2019 (Germany)
- List of number-one hits of 2020 (Germany)
- List of number-one hits of 2021 (Germany)
- List of number-one hits of 2022 (Germany)
- List of number-one songs of 2020 (Singapore)
- List of UK Singles Chart number ones of the 2020s
