= ECT =

ECT may refer to:

== Educational institutions ==
- École Canadienne de Tunis, a school in Tunis, Tunisia
- Emirates College of Technology, in Abu Dhabi

== Government and politics ==
- Catalan Workers' Left (Catalan: Esquerra Catalana dels Treballadors), a former political party in France
- Correios, the Brazilian postal service
- Energy Charter Treaty, for cross-border cooperation

== Medicine and psychology ==
- Ecarin clotting time
- Ectomesenchymal chondromyxoid tumor
- Electrochemotherapy
- Electroconvulsive therapy
- Elementary cognitive task
- Emission computed tomography
- Expectation confirmation theory

== Religion ==
- Eternal conscious torment, a view of Hell in Christianity
- Evangelicals and Catholics Together, an ecumenical document

== Technology ==
- ECN-capable transport, related to Internet explicit Congestion Notification
- Eddy-current testing
- Edge crush test
- Electrical capacitance tomography
- Elementary comparison testing
- European Centre of Technology

== Transportation ==
- Ealing Community Transport, UK
- East Chicago Transit, in Illinois, US
- Eastern Continental Trail, in eastern North America

== Other uses ==
- Ecuador Time (UTC−5), standard time zone
- ECT (TV programme), UK, 1985
