= HappyOrNot =

Finnish provider of devices for measurement of customer satisfaction

HappyOrNot Ltd.
- Industry: Customer experience
- Founded: 2009
- Founder: Heikki Väänänen; Ville Levaniemi
- Headquarters: Tampere, Finland
- Area served: Worldwide
- Key people: Carl Holmquist (Chairman), Tim Waterton (CEO)
- Products: Analytics platform & BI integrations|Customer feedback digital signage|Customer feedback terminals
- Website: happy-or-not.com

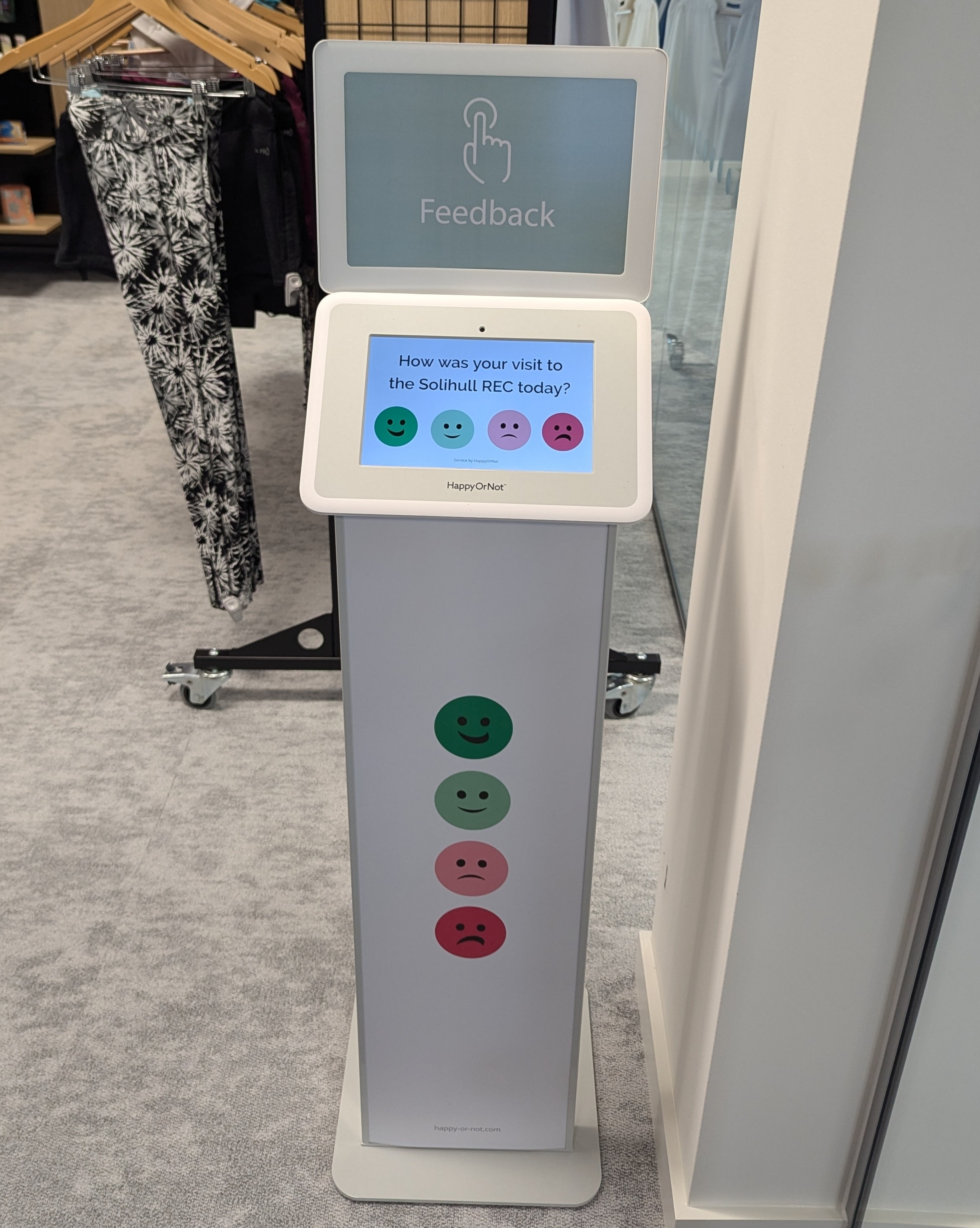
A "Smiley Touch" touchscreen terminal by HappyOrNot

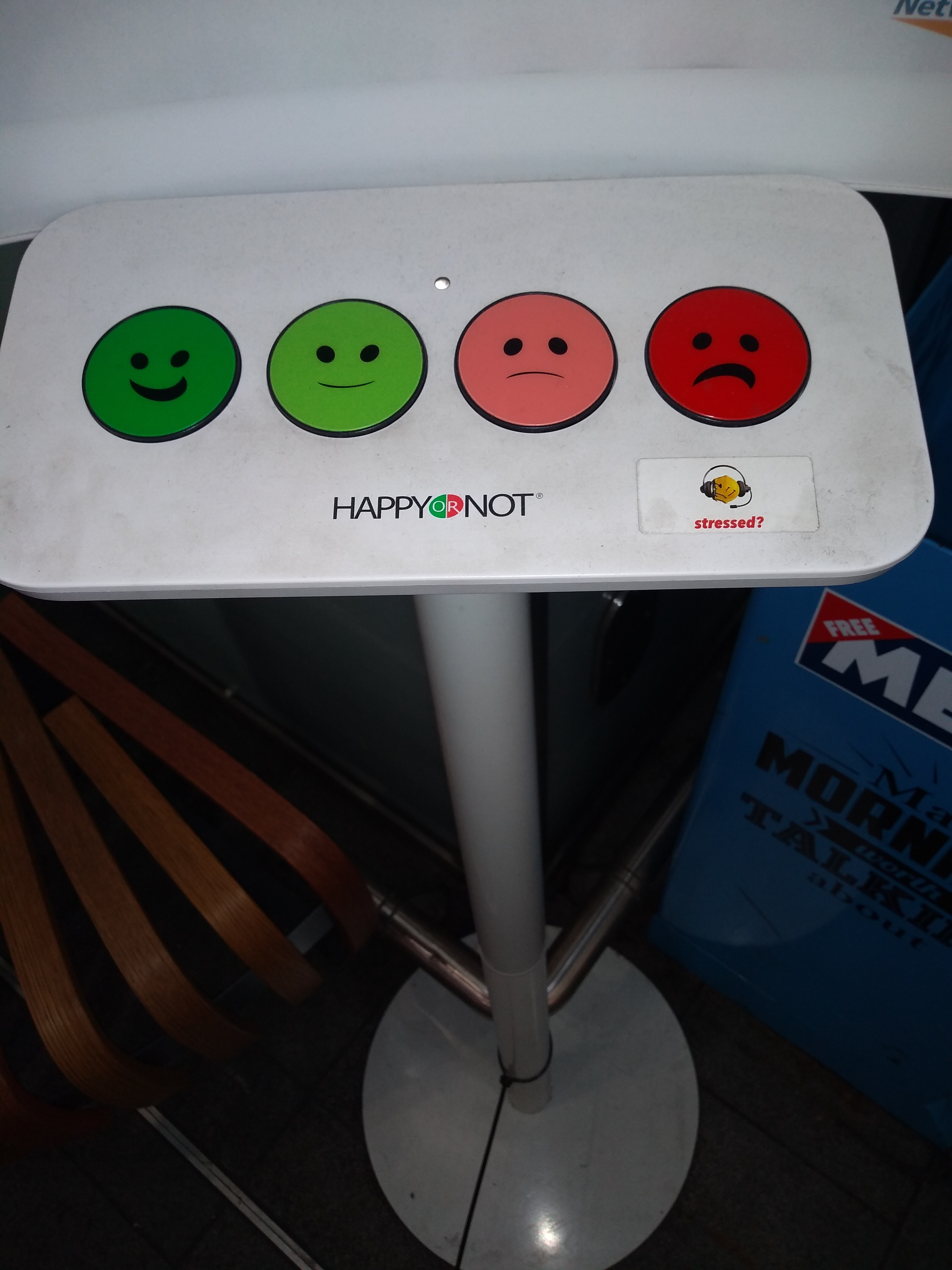
A "Smiley Terminal" button terminal by HappyOrNot

HappyOrNot Ltd. is a Finnish company that makes feedback terminals for measuring customer satisfaction. The terminals consist of four smiley-faced buttons that customers are invited to press to indicate whether they are very happy, happy, unhappy or very unhappy with the service they were provided. This information is used by companies to find points where they provide suboptimal service and to improve it.

== History ==
The company was founded by Heikki Väänänen and Ville Levaniemi in 2009. As of October 2017, it had 65 employees and 4,000 clients using 25,000 terminals in locations such as airports, shops and hospitals. Among the first big international customers were Heathrow Airport in 2012 which was a breakthrough contract for the company as it made the terminals visible to international business leaders, and the stadium of San Francisco 49ers that used terminals to find and solve service problems in real time, like bathrooms running out of paper towels. The terminals were originally developed as a tool for collecting anonymous employee feedback before being marketed more broadly for customer satisfaction.

In September 2019, HappyOrNot raised 25 million US dollars in growth financing led by Verdane, to expand its product offering and international reach.

By 2025, the company expanded beyond its original four-button terminals to include additional digital and tablet-based feedback touchpoints which have collected and analyzed over two billion customer feedback responses. It also introduced AI-powered open feedback features through its proprietary model, to summarize free-text comments, group themes, and surface patterns.

== Organization ==
The company is headquartered in Tampere, Finland, and maintains an office in Florida, United States. It distributes its products through a network of resellers in multiple countries.

== Products and services ==
In 2019, the terminals uploaded data normally once a day (via the mobile phone network).

HappyOrNot makes products for feedback measurement. Their first product called Smiley Terminal contains four buttons with emoji-based faces. The company also makes digital and tablet-based feedback touchpoints, which help customers collect real-time information about, for example, wait times, quality of products, or services. A Smiley Touch touchscreen terminal can ask several survey questions, allow users to write free-text comments, or scan QR codes. With its camera, it can also capture anonymous information on age and sex.

The company also provides analytics and reporting software that allows organizations to review customer feedback collected through its terminals and other digital touchpoints. The company provides clients with a “Happy Index,” a metric representing customer satisfaction at a given time and place. The system can also generate real-time alerts when negative feedback is recorded, allowing frontline staff to respond to potential problems as they occur.

According to Tech.eu, in 2025 it introduced AI-based open feedback capabilities to analyze free-text customer comments, including automated summarization and the organization of feedback into thematic categories. The system can also filter inappropriate content and support multilingual feedback analysis.

== Market ==
As of 2020, the company had sold more than 30,000 feedback terminals and reported serving approximately 4,000 clients across 135 countries, according to The Economist. Deployments have spanned sectors including aviation, retail, healthcare, banking, and sports venues, with reported clients including Heathrow Airport, the San Francisco 49ers’ Levi's Stadium, IKEA, Shoe Station, and Cardiff and Vale University Health Board.
