= École Canadienne de Tunis =

Location
- Charguia 1, Tunis Tunisies; Tunis; Tunisia
- Coordinates: 36.8367389°N 10.20823889999997°E

Information
- Website: ec-tunis.com

École Canadienne de Tunis (ECT) is a Canadian international school in Tunis, Tunisia. It has primary and secondary levels.

The school opened in 2014.

The School is accredited to offer International Baccalaureate Programs (Primary PYP and Secondary MYP).
