= Feedback terminal =

Physical device used to collect feedback

A feedback terminal is a physical device that is commonly used to collect large amounts of anonymous real-time feedback from customers, employees, travelers, visitors or students. Typically, feedback terminals feature buttons that users can press to indicate how satisfied they are with the service provided. This information can then be used by organisations to analyze where the experience is optimal, and where it can be improved.

== Applications ==
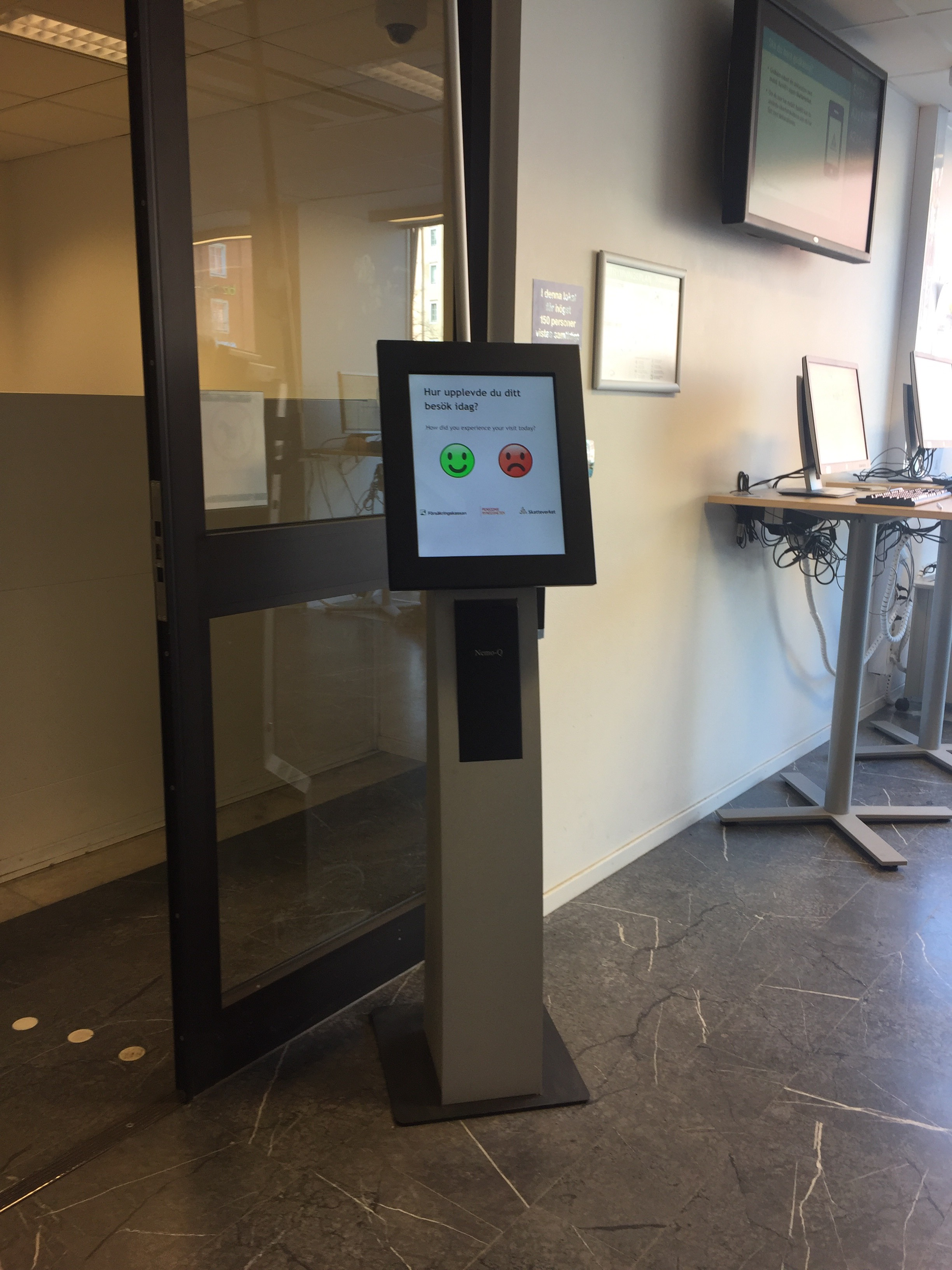
A feedback terminal with a touchscreen, which enables users to leave open text feedback.

Feedback terminals are utilized to measure and improve customer and employee experience across a broad range of industries. Feedback terminals have seen use in a wide variety of industries, including retail, healthcare, hospitality industry, airports, and educational institutions.

Feedback terminals also allow for the collection of real-time feedback. For example, by collecting real-time feedback in a public restroom, a facilities manager can be alerted if the collected customer experience has dropped below the certain threshold and then can immediately send out cleaners.

Feedback terminals are also often used to measure Net Promoter Score (NPS) on-site, a metric which can be used to gauge the loyalty of a company's customer relationships. Using a five button feedback terminal, the Net Promoter Score is can be calculated based on responses to a question asking about a customer's experience. Doing so can allow companies to more efficiently categorize customers based on their expected behavior.

== Benefits ==
The main benefit of such feedback collection is that organisations can collect a larger amount of data when compared to traditional surveys, potentially registering thousands of impressions in a day from a wide range of customers.

Measuring people's experience along the customer journey helps business and other organisations understand how people feel about their experiences at various touchpoints. The organisations can use the feedback data to make improvements that meet the expectations of the majority.

Real-time feedback is one of the major benefits of the feedback terminals compared to alternative survey methods. As opposed to traditional surveys, people can use feedback terminals to express their opinion right after the experience has happened, so the feedback could also often be more accurate. In addition, the ability to track feedback in real-time enables the organisations to pinpoint sudden drops in customer or employee experience and solve problems before they get out of control or too many people get disappointed with their experiences.

Some providers of feedback terminals also allow their customers to switch between smiley and multiple-choice questions to poll for more precise answers. For example, using multiple-choice feedback buttons, customers can express their opinion on what the company needs to improve next.

One major benefit also comes from a marketing perspective. By displaying positive feedback scores, companies can boost confidence about their products and services and in turn win more new customers. This tactic has been widely used among businesses in the tourism sector by displaying feedback or review scores from popular tourism websites.

Additionally, feedback terminals often collect more responses compared to traditional surveys. Organisations using feedback terminals could expect to receive feedback from up to 30% or more of the footfall.

Finally, by deploying several feedback terminals, organisations can compare results from multiple locations. This feature could be very useful in a pursuit of providing the same level of customer experience across all outlets that belong to the same brand. In a notable example, feedback terminals have been used to gauge customer experience across one hundred and fifty gas stations and immediately managers could see substantial differences in customer experience that had to be addressed.

== Criticism ==
Some experts argue that organisations should be careful when interpreting the data that was collected using feedback terminals. The reason being that such surveys are likely to have biased results due to unrepresentative data collection. Collected data may overly represent extremes, and this would cause for inaccurate projections.

The anonymity aspect of feedback terminals has been criticized too. According to some experts, the data anonymity prevents organizations from knowing if they satisfy their most important customers.
