= Expectation confirmation theory =

Theory to explain post-purchase satisfaction

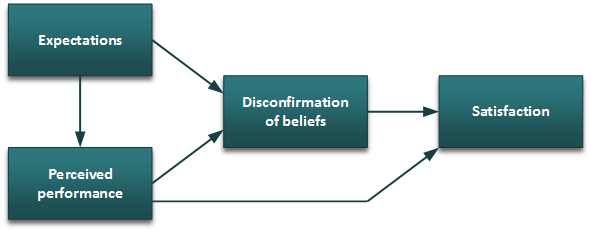
A model of expectation confirmation theory.

Expectation confirmation theory (or ECT) is a cognitive theory which seeks to explain post-purchase or post-adoption satisfaction as a function of expectations, perceived performance, and disconfirmation of beliefs. The structure of the theory was developed in a series of two papers written by Richard L. Oliver in 1977 and 1980. Although the theory originally appeared in the psychology and marketing literatures, it has since been adopted in several other scientific fields, notably including consumer research and information systems, among others.

== Theoretical constructs ==
Expectation confirmation theory involves four primary constructs: expectations, perceived performance, disconfirmation of beliefs, and satisfaction.

=== Expectations ===
Expectations refer to the attributes or characteristics that a person anticipates or predicts will be associated with an entity such as a product, service, or technology artifact. Expectations are posited to directly influence both perceptions of performance and disconfirmation of beliefs, and are posited to indirectly influence post-purchase or post-adoption satisfaction by way of a mediational relationship through the disconfirmation construct. Pre-purchase or pre-adoption expectations form the basis of comparison against which the product, service, or technology artifact is ultimately judged.

=== Perceived performance ===
Perceived performance refers to a person’s perceptions of the actual performance of a product, service, or technology artifact. According to expectation confirmation theory, perceptions of performance are directly influenced by pre-purchase or pre-adoption expectations, and in turn directly influence disconfirmation of beliefs and post-purchase or post-adoption satisfaction. Perceived performance is also posited to indirectly influence post-purchase or post-adoption satisfaction by way of a mediational relationship through the disconfirmation construct.

=== Disconfirmation of beliefs ===
Disconfirmation of beliefs refers to the judgments or evaluations that a person makes with respect to a product, service, or technology artifact. These evaluations or judgments are made in comparison to the person’s original expectations. When a product, service, or technology artifact outperforms the person’s original expectations, the disconfirmation is positive, which is posited to increase post-purchase or post-adoption satisfaction. When a product, service, or technology artifact underperforms the person’s original expectations, the disconfirmation is negative, which is posited to decrease post-purchase or post-adoption satisfaction (i.e., to increase dissatisfaction).

=== Satisfaction ===
Post-purchase or post-adoption satisfaction refers to the extent to which a person is pleased or contented with a product, service, or technology artifact after having gained direct experience with the product, service, or artifact. Expectation confirmation theory posits that satisfaction is directly influenced by disconfirmation of beliefs and perceived performance, and is indirectly influenced by both expectations and perceived performance by means of a mediational relationship which passes through the disconfirmation construct.

Parallels between brand marketing and interpersonal seduction

Several authors have noted that brands employ, in order to generate consumer loyalty, mechanisms comparable to those a person uses to attract a potential partner: both processes aim to produce an emotional response rather than a purely rational evaluation.

Status as attractiveness

In the luxury fashion sector, brands such as Dior or Louis Vuitton compete primarily not on function or quality, but on the social status they communicate to the person wearing them; economist Thorstein Veblen described this mechanism as conspicuous consumption, the display of costly goods as a means of projecting social position (Veblen, 1899). An analogous mechanism operates in interpersonal attraction: a person with high social status—such as an athlete or a recognized public figure—tends to be perceived as more attractive not because of their individual qualities, but because of the status that being with them would represent. In evolutionary biology, Amotz Zahavi's handicap principle (1975) explains a similar pattern: a signal is only a reliable indicator of quality when it is costly to produce or sustain, which applies both to an animal ornament and to a luxury item or a relationship with a high-status person.

Idealization and coherence of experience

Experiential marketing, a concept developed by Bernd Schmitt (1999), describes how brands deliberately design experiences that stimulate emotion before consumption occurs. One example is the anticipation generated by a trip to a theme park: the period leading up to the experience produces an idealization comparable to that of the early stage of a romantic relationship, in which the person projects expectations about how events will unfold. Richard Oliver's expectation confirmation theory (1980) explains what happens afterward: satisfaction depends on whether the actual experience confirms or contradicts what was idealized. If the brand fails to maintain coherence between what was promised and what was experienced—for example, if the experience turns out to be disappointing despite the expectations generated—the consumer loses interest in repeating it, in a way equivalent to how a date that fails to meet expectations reduces interest in a second date.

Shared values

Beyond status and experience, brands build identification through values. Nike, for example, associates its brand identity with personal achievement through its "Just Do It" slogan and its sponsorship of athletes such as Cristiano Ronaldo, seeking to make its target audience feel represented. This mechanism is comparable to value affinity in interpersonal relationships: people tend to bond with those who share their value system and to avoid relationships with those they do not identify with in that regard. Susan Fournier's brand relationship theory (1998) formalizes this idea by proposing that consumers develop bonds with brands that are structurally similar to interpersonal relationships, with comparable levels of commitment and emotional attachment.
