= Marketing Accountability Standards Board =

- Abbreviation: MASB
- Formation: 2007; 19 years ago
- Type: Nonprofit organization
- Headquarters: United States
- Region served: Global
- Website: themasb.org

The Marketing Accountability Standards Board (MASB), authorized by the Marketing Accountability Foundation (MAF), is an independent, private sector, self-governing organization composed of academics and practitioners. Its primary goal is to establish marketing measurement and accountability standards that drive continuous improvement in financial performance and to provide guidance and education to users of performance and financial information.

== History ==
The MASB was established in 2007 following recommendations from The Boardroom Project (2004–2007). The Boardroom Project responded to a growing demand for marketing accountability, identifying a lack of reliable metrics connecting marketing activities and costs to financial returns.

The Boardroom Project found that marketing was often relegated to the “default” category of cost control because it lacked metrics reliably tying activities to financial returns. While organizations recognized the importance of metrics and accountability, efforts were fragmented, narrowly focused, and not consistently linked to financial outcomes. The Project concluded that standardized measurement processes across industries would improve decision-making and resource allocation.

Drawing parallels to manufacturing (ISO standards) and accounting (FASB/IASB), the Project emphasized the necessity of an authoritative body to establish and maintain these standards. It envisioned MASB as a critical force in enhancing marketing's credibility and elevating it from a discretionary expense to a strategic board-level investment.

== Mission ==
The MASB's mission is to “establish marketing measurement and accountability standards across industries and domains for continuous improvement in financial performance and for the guidance and education of business decision-makers and users of performance and financial information.”

== Role ==
The MASB develops standards and processes for evaluating marketing metrics to ensure they meet credibility, validity, transparency, and understandability criteria. It does not endorse specific measures but evaluates them against the Marketing Metric Audit Protocol (MMAP). The MASB's Dynamic Marketing Metrics Catalogue serves as a repository for these evaluations, enabling organizations to select measures aligned with industry best practices.

The MASB also demonstrates how to apply ideal measures based on MMAP for specific marketing activities, such as television and online advertising. Additionally, it investigates practices that generate knowledge, establish causality, and apply findings to improve return on marketing investments.

MASB maintains the Universal Marketing Dictionary and an education-focused YouTube channel.

== Projects ==
The MASB conducts its work on a project basis, categorized into standards, research, and conceptual frameworks. Projects are selected based on the pervasiveness of the issue, alternative solutions, technical feasibility, available resources, and potential impact. Convergence opportunities and collaboration possibilities are also considered. Project recommendations come from charter members and insights from C-Level interviews.

For a comprehensive list of projects, see:

- Completed Projects
- Projects Underway
- Projects Ready for Industry Feedback

== Marketing Metric Audit Protocol (MMAP) ==
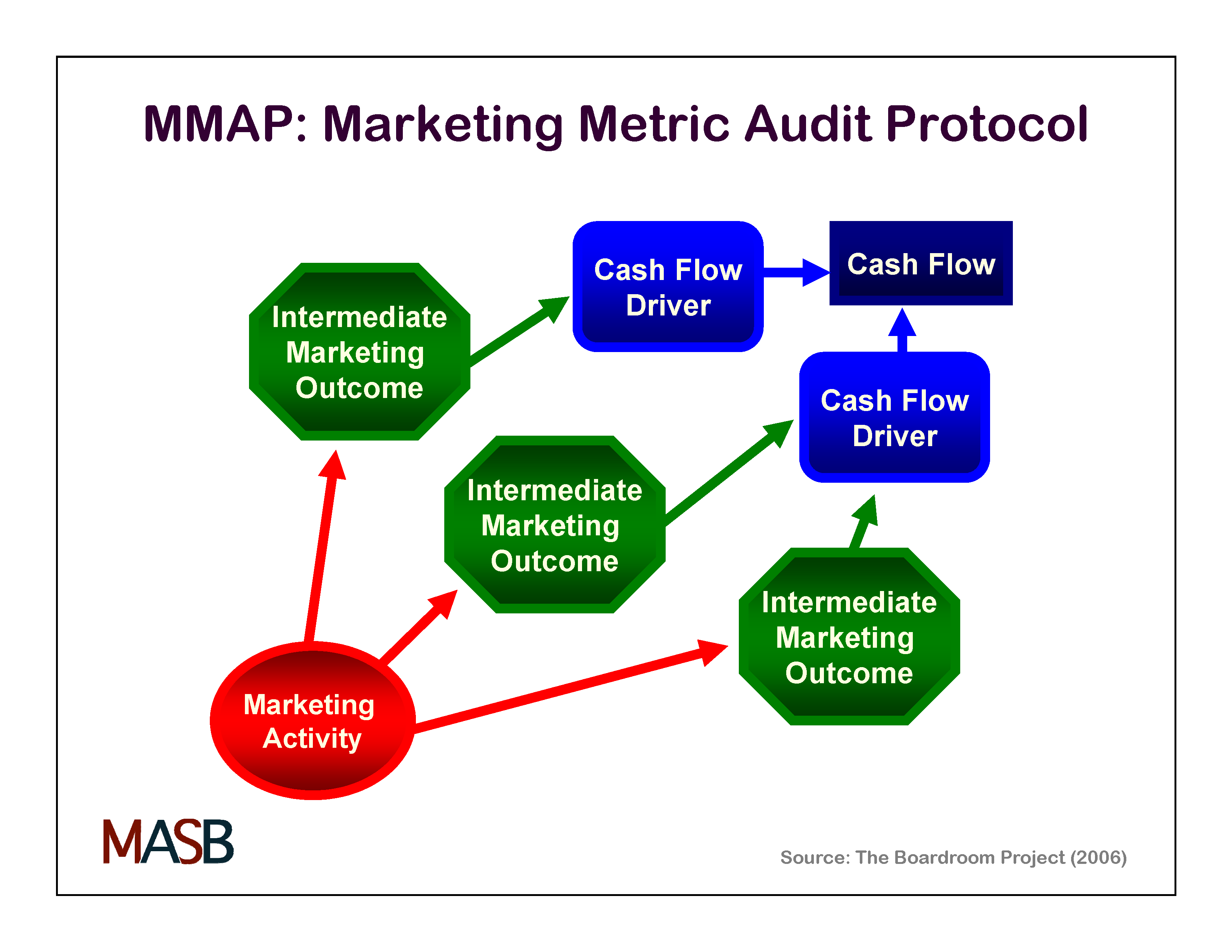
Marketing Metric Audit Protocol (MMAP)

The Marketing Metric Audit Protocol (MMAP) is a formal process that connects marketing activities to financial performance through validated intermediate metrics. MMAP ensures that marketing metrics meet the standards of reliability, predictive validity, sensitivity, and transparency. Its ultimate objective is to link all business activities, including marketing, to cash flow drivers.

MMAP emphasizes the importance of validating intermediate outcome measures against both short-term and long-term cash flow to forecast and improve returns effectively.

== MMAP Metric Profiles ==
MMAP Metric Profiles is a catalog of marketing metrics that documents the psychometric properties of measures, including reliability, predictive validity, range of use, and sensitivity. This catalog addresses the lack of technical transparency from many commercial providers and provides publicly available information focused on standalone metrics rather than integrated suites of products and services.

== Marketing Accountability Foundation ==
The Marketing Accountability Foundation (MAF) oversees MASB's activities, including its Advisory Council (MAC). MAF ensures the integrity of the standard-setting process, provides funding and administration, and selects MASB directors and MAC advisors. It is a 501(c)(3) nonprofit organization established for charitable, educational, scientific, and literary purposes.

MAF's funding sources include:

- Membership dues
- Projects
- Workshops
- Technical services
- Publications
- Training and auditing services

== Membership ==
Membership in MASB is open to organizations across various sectors, including:

- Marketers
- Business schools
- Measurement and modeling providers
- Media companies
- Advertising agencies
- Industry associations
- Independent consultants

== Representative Publications ==
Gaski, John F. (20210. Introducing the Marketing Accountability Standards Board (MASB) and its Common-Language Marketing Dictionary: Background, Description Vision, and Prospects, Journal of Macromarketing, 41(4), 521-526.

Findley, Frank, Kelly Johnson, Douglas Crang & David W. Stewart (2018). Findley, F., Johnson, K., Crang, D., & Stewart, D. W. (2020). Effectiveness and Efficiency of TV’s Brand-Building Power: A Historical Review: Why the Persuasion Rating Point (PRP) Is a More Accurate Metric than the GRP. Journal of Advertising Research, 60(4), 361–369. https://doi.org/10.2501/JAR-2020-011.

Kuse, Allan R. & David W. Stewart (2020). Master of Marketing Meaasurement: Margaret Henderson Blair on Marketing Accountability. Cambridge Scholars Publishing.

Stewart, David W. & Craig Gugel (2016). Accountable Marketing: Linking Marketing Actions to Financial Performance. Routledge.
