= Marketing metric audit protocol =

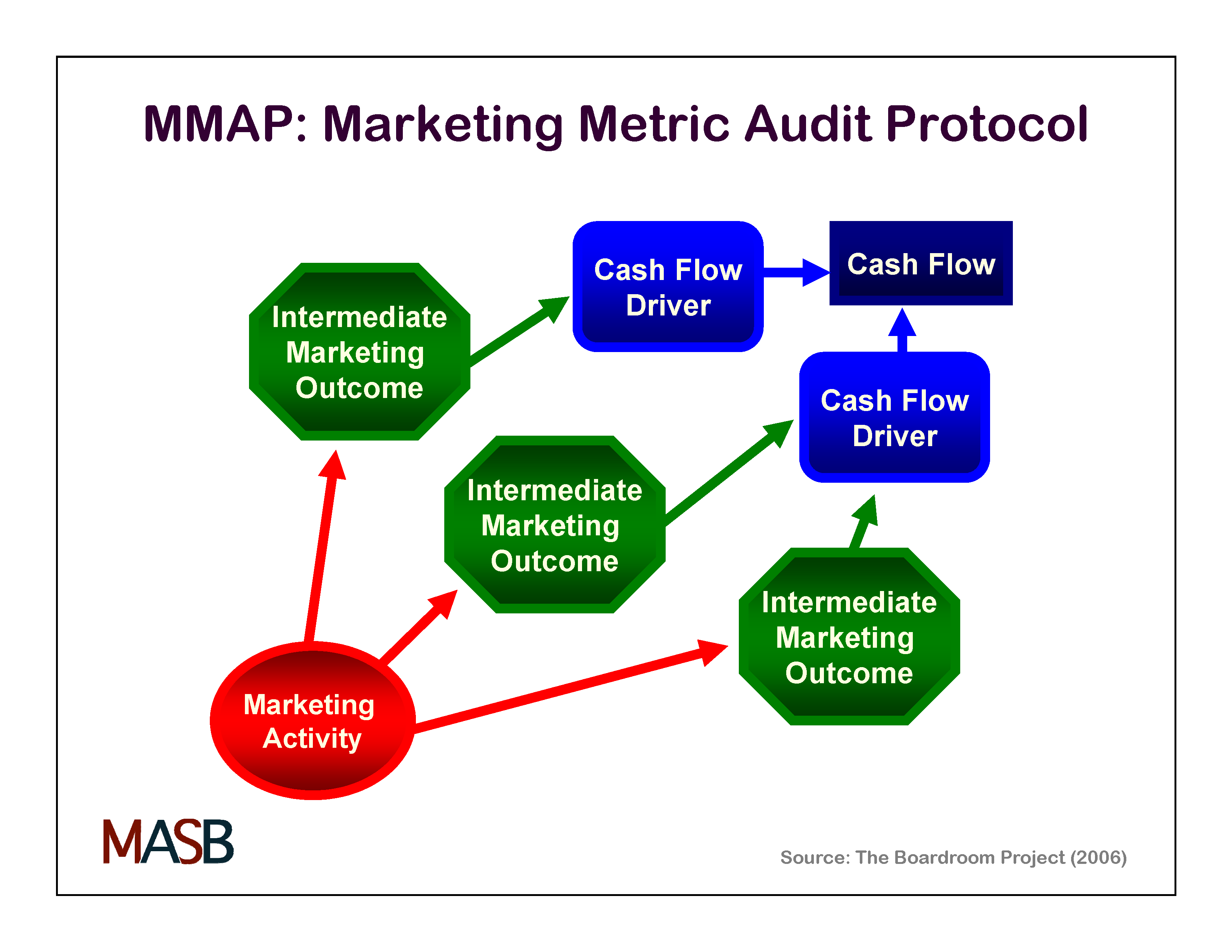
Marketing metric audit protocol (MMAP)

The marketing metric audit protocol (MMAP) is the Marketing Accountability Standards Board's formal process for connecting marketing activities to the financial performance of the firm.

The process includes the conceptual linking of marketing activities to intermediate marketing outcome metrics to cash flow drivers of the business, as well as the validation and causality characteristics of an ideal metric. Cash flow both short-term and over time is the ultimate metric to which all activities of a business enterprise, including marketing, should be causally linked through the validation of intermediate marketing measures.

The process of validating the intermediate outcome measures against short-term and/or long-term cash flow drivers is necessary to facilitate forecasting and improvement in return. "Intermediate marketing outcomes" refer to measures such as sales volume, price premium, and market share.

== Metric profiles ==
MMAP metric profiles is a catalogue of marketing metrics that provides detailed documentation regarding the psychometric properties of the measures and specific information with respect to reliability, validity, range of use, sensitivity . . . particularly in terms of validity and sensitivity with respect to financial criteria.

Most commercial providers offer little detail about their measures. Most of the publicly available information focuses on integrated suites of products and services with little technical information or reference to characteristics of specific measures that would allow profiling according to MMAP.

The metrics catalogue is provided on the MASB website as metric providers undergo the audit and their offerings are profiled according to MMAP.

== Characteristics ==
MASB has identified ten characteristics of an "ideal metric":

1. Relevant . . . addresses specific (pending) action
2. Predictive . . . accurately predicts outcome of (pending) action
3. Objective . . . not subject to personal interpretation
4. Calibrated . . . means the same across conditions & cultures
5. Reliable . . . dependable & stable over time
6. Sensitive . . . identifies meaningful differences in outcomes
7. Simple . . . uncomplicated meaning & implications clear
8. Causal . . . course of action leads to improvement
9. Transparent . . . subject to independent audit
10. Quality Assured . . . formal/on-going processes to assure 1–9
