= The Christmas Princess (book) =

2022 children's picture book

- Authors: Mariah Carey; Michaela Angela Davis
- Illustrator: Fuuji Takashi
- Language: English
- Publisher: Henry Holt Books For Young Readers
- Publication date: November 1, 2022
- Media type: Print (hardcover) Digital
- Pages: 48
- ISBN: 978-1-25083711-0
- Preceded by: The Meaning of Mariah Carey

The Christmas Princess is a picture book written by Mariah Carey released on November 1, 2022. It was written with Michaela Angela Davis and illustrations by Fuuji Takashi. The book is described as a modern fairy tale featuring a Little Mariah who sets off on a "wintry, wondrous journey, ultimately discovering the healing power of her voice to spread the spirit of Christmas at home and all around the world."

The book is published by Henry Holt Books for Young Readers and received mostly negative reviews on Goodreads regarding its plot, the use of inappropriate language and random characters, but praised its fine illustrations.
