= Michaela Angela Davis =

American writer (born 1964)

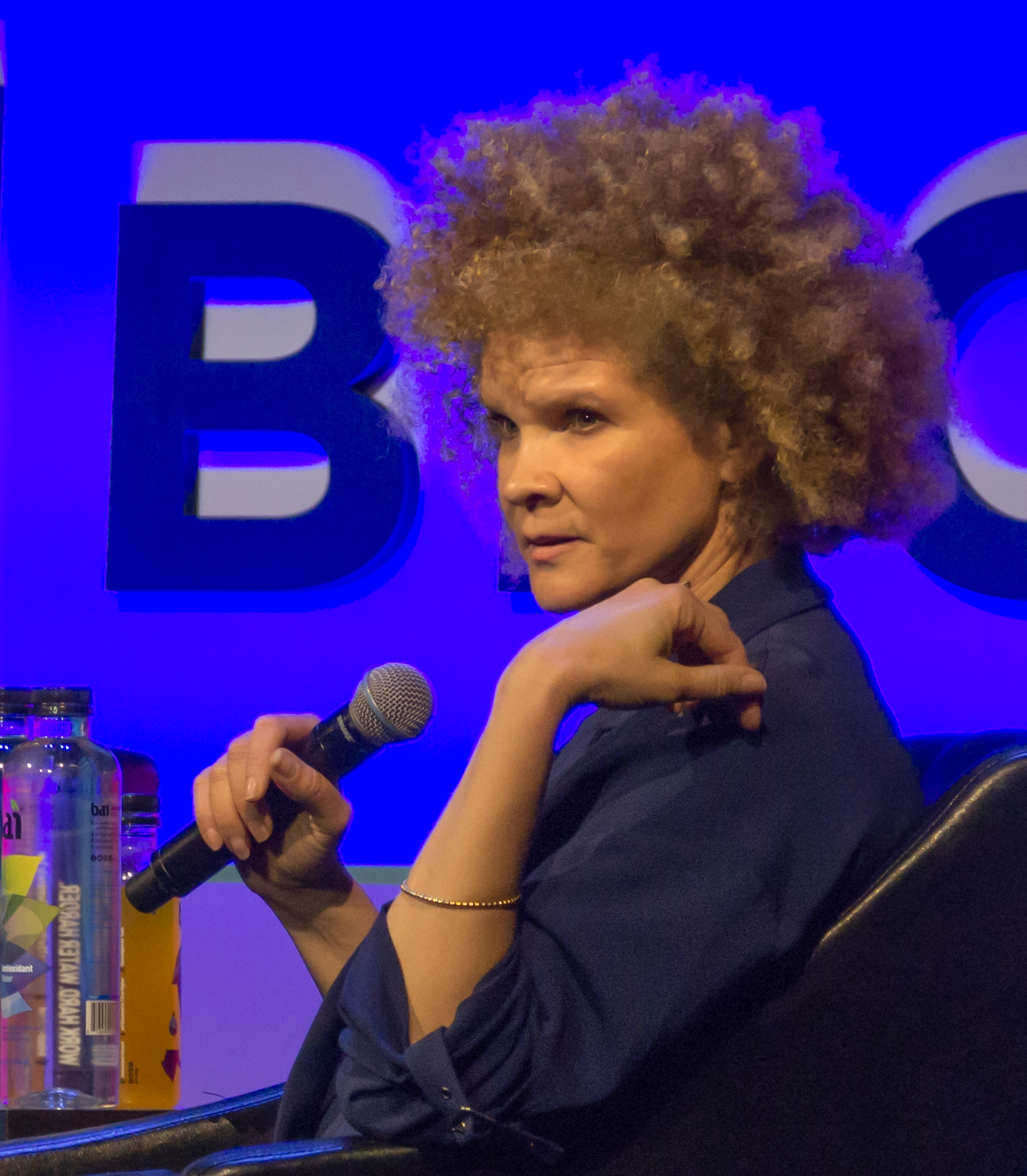
- Michaela Angela Davis at the 2018 Tribeca Film Festival
- Born: 31 March 1964 (age 62); Landshut, Germany
- Occupations: Writer, image activist

Michaela Angela Davis is a writer on African-American style, race, gender and hip-hop culture in the United States. She is also a fashion expert and an "image activist."

== Early life ==
Michaela Angela Davis was born on March 31, 1964, in Landshut, Germany, and raised in Washington, D.C. She is the daughter of Harold Edward Gregory Davis and Helen Jean Butler. Her mother was convinced that her next child would be a boy and, after visiting the Sistine Chapel during her pregnancy, decided to name him Michael Angelo. When Davis was born, her mother gave her the female version of the name, Michaela Angela. Davis has two sisters, Debbie and Monica, and a brother, Eddie.

She began her studies at the Duke Ellington School of the Arts in Washington, D.C., as a National Arts Scholar. She went to college at New York University, and studied at the Stella Adler Acting Conservatory, and the Alvin Ailey American Dance Theater.

== Publishing and writing career ==
After completing her studies, Davis went to work in 1991 for Essence as an associate fashion editor. Her first assignment was the styling of Anita Hill in preparation for her testimony before Congress for the nomination hearings of Clarence Thomas as a Supreme Court justice.

Davis became the associate fashion, culture and the executive fashion and beauty editor for Essence magazine. She was the founding fashion director for Vibe magazine, and she was the last editor-in-chief of Honey, a magazine for 18- to 34-year-old black women.

Davis has contributed to many projects, such as Everything But the Burden: What White People are Taking from Black Culture (ed. Greg Tate; Broadway Books, 2003). She wrote Beloved Baby: A Baby's Scrapbook and Journal (Pocket Books, 1995).

In 2020, she and Mariah Carey published a memoir entitled, The Meaning of Mariah Carey, and in 2022 they published a picture book, The Christmas Princess.

In 2025, Davis released her first memoir, Tenderheaded.

== Stylist ==
Davis has worked as a celebrity stylist for people such as Oprah Winfrey, Beyoncé, Prince, Diana Ross, Mary J. Blige and LL Cool J. She has also worked as a stylist on several films, including Paid in Full (2002).

== Film career ==
She has been featured in documentary films including The Souls of Black Girls (2008). Davis has had several television appearances, most recently on BET in their presentation of Hip Hop vs. America II: Am I My Sister's Keeper?

Davis executive produced the 2022 Hulu docuseries "The Hair Tales" along with Oprah Winfrey and Tracee Ellis Ross.

== Activism ==
Davis is working on a novel called The Revolution of Happiness: A Book and Digital Conversation Project. It is a culmination of "honest and innovative cross-generational conversations with revolutionary-thinking Black women about disturbing the pain that has burdened or molested our natural exquisite selves".

Davis is the leader of "Mad Free," a multi-platform, multi-generational critical community conversation.
