= Mariah Carey =

American singer-songwriter (born 1969)

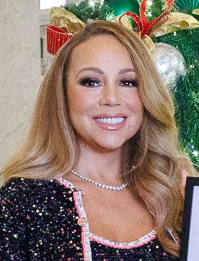
- Carey in 2023
- Born: March 27, 1969 (age 57) (Note: While some sources give a birth year of 1970, a birth announcement in Carey's hometown newspaper The Long-Islander indicates 1969, as do others.); Huntington, New York, US
- Occupations: Singer; songwriter; record producer; actress
- Years active: 1988–present
- Works: Albums; singles; songs; videography; performances
- Spouses: Tommy Mottola (m. 1993; div. 1998); Nick Cannon (m. 2008; div. 2016)
- Children: 2
- Awards: Full list
- Musical career
- Genres: R&B; pop; hip-hop; soul
- Instruments: Vocals
- Labels: Columbia; Crave; Virgin; MonarC; Island Def Jam; Island; Def Jam; Epic; Gamma
- Formerly of: Chick
- Website: mariahcarey.com

Mariah Carey (/məˈraɪə/ mə-RY-ə; born March 27, 1969) is an American singer-songwriter, record producer, and actress. Dubbed the "Songbird Supreme", Carey is known for her five-octave vocal range, melismatic singing style, signature use of the whistle register, and diva persona. An influential figure in popular culture, she was ranked as the fifth-greatest singer of all time by Rolling Stone in 2023.

Carey rose to fame with her 1990 self-titled debut album and became the only artist to have their first five singles reach number one in the US, from "Vision of Love" to the title track of her second album, Emotions (1991). She achieved international success with the best-selling albums Music Box (1993) and Daydream (1995). The remix to "Fantasy", with Ol' Dirty Bastard, introduced her new image and hip-hop-inflected sound, which she later embraced on Butterfly (1997) and Rainbow (1999). With eleven consecutive years of US number-one singles, Carey was named by Billboard as the Artist of the Decade. Following a career decline, she made a comeback with The Emancipation of Mimi (2005), her 21st-century bestseller.

Carey's life and career have received widespread media coverage. She has been dubbed the "Queen of Christmas" due to the enduring popularity of her Christmas music, particularly Merry Christmas (1994), one of the best-selling holiday albums. Its lead single, "All I Want for Christmas Is You", is the second longest-running number-one song on the Billboard Hot 100 and the best-selling holiday single by a woman. Outside of music, she co-founded the youth program Camp Mariah in 1994; starred in films such as Glitter (2001), Precious (2009), The Butler (2013), and The Lego Batman Movie (2017); and served as a judge on American Idol (2013). Her 2020 memoir, The Meaning of Mariah Carey, reached number one on The New York Times Best Seller list.

Carey is one of the best-selling music artists in history, with estimated sales of over 220 million records. She has the most Billboard Hot 100 number-one singles of a solo artist (19), a female songwriter (18), and a female producer (15), spending a record 101 weeks atop the chart. "One Sweet Day" and "We Belong Together" were ranked by Billboard as the most successful songs of the 1990s and 2000s, respectively. Her accolades include 5 Grammy Awards, a Grammy Global Impact Award, 10 American Music Awards, 19 World Music Awards, 14 Billboard Music Awards, the Michael Jackson Video Vanguard Award, and an induction into the Songwriters Hall of Fame. One of the highest-certified artists in the US, Carey has four diamond certifications from the Recording Industry Association of America.

== Early life ==
Carey was born on March 27, 1969, in Huntington, New York, on Long Island. Her name is derived from the song "They Call the Wind Maria", originally from the 1951 Broadway musical Paint Your Wagon. She is the youngest of three children born to Patricia (née Hickey), a former opera singer and vocal coach of Irish descent, and Alfred Roy Carey, an aeronautical engineer of both African-American and Afro-Venezuelan lineage. The last name "Carey" was adopted by her Venezuelan grandfather, Roberto Núñez, after he emigrated to New York.

Patricia's family disowned her for marrying a black man. Racial tensions prevented the Carey family from integrating into their community. While they lived in Huntington, their neighbors poisoned the family dog and set fire to their car. After her parents' divorce, Carey had little contact with her father and spent much of her time at home alone and began singing at age three, often imitating her mother's take on Verdi's opera Rigoletto in Italian. Her older sister Alison moved in with their father while Mariah and her elder brother Morgan lived with their mother.

During her years in elementary school, Carey excelled in the arts, such as music and literature. She began writing poetry and lyrics while attending Harborfields High School in Greenlawn, New York, where she graduated in 1987. Carey began vocal training under her mother's guidance. Though she was a classically trained opera singer, Patricia Carey never pressured her daughter to pursue a career in classical opera, with Mariah Carey stating that "I respect opera like crazy, but it didn't influence me." In high school, Mariah Carey was often absent because of her work as a demo singer. Working in the Long Island music scene gave her opportunities to work with musicians such as Gavin Christopher and Ben Margulies, with whom she co-wrote material for her demo tape. After moving to New York City, she worked part-time jobs to pay the rent and completed 500 hours of beauty school. Carey moved into a one-bedroom apartment in Manhattan with four female students as roommates. She landed a gig singing backup for freestyle singer Brenda K. Starr.

== Career ==
=== 1988–1992: Mariah Carey, Emotions and MTV Unplugged ===
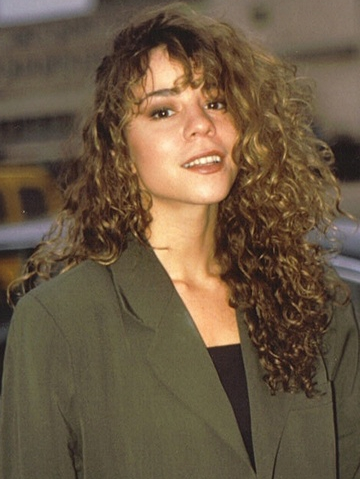
Carey exiting Shepherd's Bush Empire after promoting her single "Vision of Love" on Wogan in 1990

In December 1988, Carey accompanied Starr to a music executive's party and handed her demo tape to the head of Columbia Records, Tommy Mottola. After listening to the tape during the ride home, he immediately requested the driver turn around. She had already left the event, and Mottola spent two weeks looking for her. Another record label expressed interest and a bidding war ensued. He signed Carey to Columbia and enlisted producers Ric Wake, Narada Michael Walden, and Rhett Lawrence for her first album.

On June 5, 1990, Carey made her first public appearance at the 1990 NBA Finals, singing "America the Beautiful". The highlight was the whistle note toward the song's conclusion, sparking CBS Sports anchor Pat O'Brien to declare, "The Palace now has a queen." Columbia marketed Carey as the main female artist on their roster and spent more than $1 million (equivalent to $2.5 million in 2025) promoting her debut studio album, Mariah Carey. The album topped the US Billboard 200 for eleven consecutive weeks, after Carey's exposure at the 33rd Annual Grammy Awards, where she won the award for Best New Artist, and Best Female Pop Vocal Performance for her first single "Vision of Love". It became her first US Billboard Hot 100 chart-topper, followed by the album's follow-up singles "Love Takes Time", "Someday", and "I Don't Wanna Cry". Mariah Carey was the best-selling album in the United States in 1991, and achieved worldwide sales of 15 million copies. Billboard named Carey the Greatest Pop Star of 1991.

Carey co-wrote, co-produced, and recorded her second studio effort, Emotions, during 1991. She described it as a homage to Motown soul music and employed the help of Walter Afanasieff, who only had a small role on her debut, as well as Robert Clivillés and David Cole, from the dance group C+C Music Factory. Carey's relationship with Margulies deteriorated over a songwriting royalties dispute. After he filed a lawsuit against Columbia's parent company, Sony Music Entertainment, the songwriting duo parted ways. Emotions was released on September 17, 1991. Its title track served as the album's lead single and became Carey's fifth chart topper on the Billboard Hot 100, making her the first artist whose first five singles reached the chart's summit. The album spawned two more singles, "Can't Let Go" and "Make It Happen", both of which peaked within the top five in the United States. Though critics praised the album's content and described it as a more mature effort, Emotions was criticized as calculated and lacking originality. While the album managed sales of eight million copies globally, Emotions failed to reach the commercial and critical heights of its predecessor.

Carey did not embark on a world tour to promote the album. Although she attributed this to stage fright and the vocally challenging nature of her material, speculation grew that Carey was a "studio worm" and incapable of producing the perfect pitch and five-octave vocal range for which she was known. In hopes of ending any speculation of her being a manufactured artist, Carey booked an appearance on MTV Unplugged. Days prior to the show's taping, Carey and Afanasieff chose to add a cover of the Jackson 5's 1970 song "I'll Be There" to the set-list. On March 16, 1992, she played and recorded an intimate seven-song show at Kaufman Astoria Studios in Queens, New York. The acclaimed revue was aired more than three times as often as the average episode, with critics heralding it as a "vocal tour de force". Carey's live version of "I'll Be There" became her sixth number-one single on the Billboard Hot 100 chart. Sony capitalized on this success and released an extended play (EP) of her performance. It earned a triple-Platinum certification by the Recording Industry Association of America (RIAA) and earned Gold and Platinum certifications in several European markets.

=== 1993–1996: Music Box, Merry Christmas and Daydream ===
After years of dating, Carey and Mottola got married on June 5, 1993. After Emotions failed to achieve the commercial heights of her debut album, Carey's subsequent release was to be marketed as adult contemporary and pop-friendly. Music Box was produced by Carey and Afanasieff, and it began a songwriting partnership that would extend until 1997's Butterfly. The album was released on August 31, 1993, to mixed reviews from music critics. Carey's songwriting was derided as clichéd and her vocal performances were described as less emotive and lazier in their delivery. In his review of the album, AllMusic's Ron Wynn concluded: "sometimes excessive spirit is preferable to an absence of passion". In promotion of the album, Carey embarked on her debut tour, a six-date concert series, the Music Box Tour. Music Box's first and second singles, "Dreamlover" and "Hero", became Carey's seventh and eighth chart-toppers in the United States, while her cover of Badfinger's "Without You" became her first number-one single in Germany, Sweden and the United Kingdom. Music Box remains Carey's best-seller and one of the best-selling albums, with worldwide sales of over 28 million copies.

In mid-1994, Carey and Luther Vandross recorded and released a cover of Lionel Richie and Diana Ross's "Endless Love". Merry Christmas, released on November 1, 1994, became the best-selling Christmas album by a female artist, with global sales of over 15 million copies. The lead single, "All I Want for Christmas Is You", became a holiday standard and continues to surge in popularity each holiday season. By October 2017, it had become the 11th best-selling single in history with over 16 million copies sold worldwide. It also became the longest-running number-one single of all-time on the Billboard Hot 100 (22 weeks) and the Billboard Global 200 (19 weeks) charts.

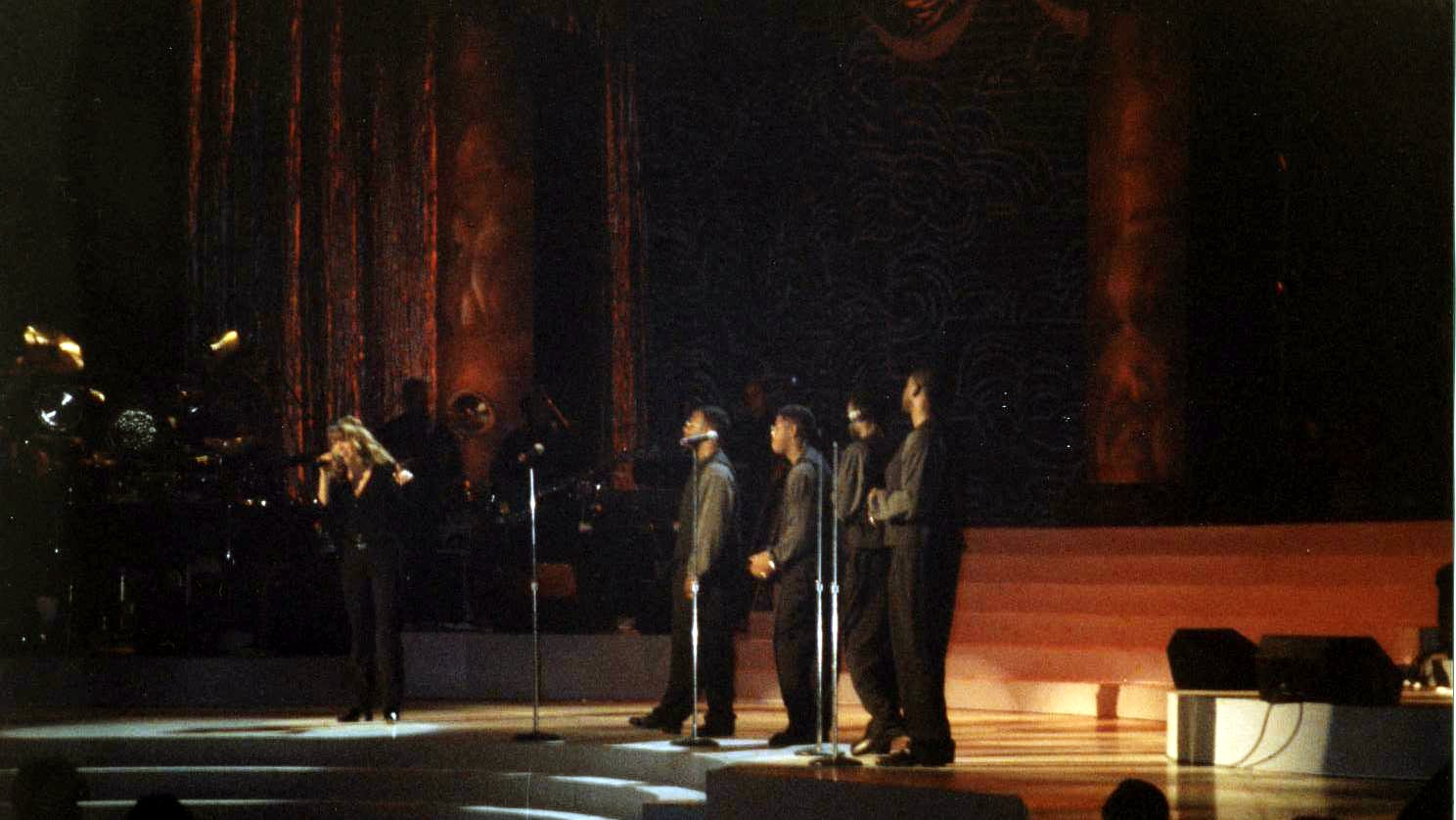
Carey performing "One Sweet Day" with Boyz II Men at Madison Square Garden in October 1995

Carey's fifth studio album, Daydream, found her consolidating creative control over her career, leading to tensions with Columbia. Songs from her prior two albums had been primarily shaped by Mottola's conceptualization of what Carey should sound like, as innocent and wholesome tracks dominated by her vocal performance. Daydream featured a departure from her allegiance to pop and gravitated heavily towards R&B and hip-hop. Critically, the album was described as Carey's best to date. The New York Times named it one of 1995's best albums and wrote it "brings R&B candy-making to a new peak of textural refinement ... Carey's songwriting has taken a leap forward and become more relaxed, sexier and less reliant on thudding clichés." Its lead single, "Fantasy", became the first single by a female artist to debut at number one on the Billboard Hot 100, and the second song overall after Michael Jackson's "You Are Not Alone". "One Sweet Day", a collaboration with R&B group Boyz II Men, served as the second single from Daydream and remained atop the Billboard Hot 100 for 16 consecutive weeks, becoming the longest-running number-one song in the chart's history at the time. It also opened at the top spot, making Carey the first act to achieve the feat twice, and was later named as the "Song of the Decade" in the magazine's original issue. The album's third single, "Always Be My Baby", became Carey's eleventh chart-topper, tying her with Madonna and Whitney Houston for the most number-one singles among female artists at the time.

Daydream became Carey's biggest-selling album in the United States, continued Carey's dominance in Asian music markets and sold in excess of 2.2 million copies in Japan alone and over 20 million copies globally. Daydream and its singles were nominated in six categories at the 38th Grammy Awards. Though considered a favorite to win the top awards of the evening, Carey was shut out, prompting her to comment "What can you do? I will never be disappointed again." In early 1996, she embarked on her first international string of concerts, the Daydream World Tour. Its seven dates spanned three in Japan and four throughout Europe. Forbes named Carey the top-earning female musician of 1996, collecting an estimated $32 million.

During the recording of Daydream, Carey also worked on the alternative rock album Someone's Ugly Daughter as part of the duo Chick, contributing writing, production, vocals and art direction. It was released during September 1995. As Columbia Records refused to release the album with her lead vocals, Carey's friend Clarissa Dane was brought in to become the face of Chick, and her vocals were layered on top of Carey's, masking her voice. Her contributions were secret until 2020.

=== 1997–2000: New image with Butterfly and Rainbow ===
Carey in 1999

Carey's subsequent musical releases followed the trend that began with Daydream. Her music began relying less on pop and adult contemporary-tinged balladry and instead incorporating heavy elements of hip-hop and R&B. On Butterfly, she collaborated with a bevy of producers other than Afanasieff, such as Sean Combs, Q-Tip and Missy Elliott. Butterfly was released on September 10, 1997, and introduced a more subdued style of singing, with critics noting Carey's incorporation of breathy vocals. Some viewed her lack of propensity to use her upper range as a sign of maturity, while others questioned whether it forebode waning vocal prowess. The music video for the album's lead single, "Honey", her first since separating from Mottola, introduced a more overtly sexual image. Butterfly became Carey's best-reviewed album, with attention placed on the album's exploration of more mature lyrical themes. In their review of the album, Rolling Stone wrote it was "not as if Carey has totally dispensed with her old saccharine, Houston-style balladry ... but the predominant mood of Butterfly is one of coolly erotic reverie." AllMusic editor Stephen Thomas Erlewine described Carey's vocals as "sultrier and more controlled than ever," and felt the album "illustrates that Carey continues to improve and refine her music, which makes her a rarity among her '90s peers.'" "Honey" and "My All", the album's fifth single, both topped the Hot 100, making Carey the female artist with the most number-one singles in the chart's history. The former became Carey's third number-one debut, a record held until 2020. Though a commercial success, Butterfly failed to reach the commercial heights of her previous albums, Music Box and Daydream.

After concluding her Butterfly World Tour, Carey participated in the VH1 Divas benefit concert on April 14, 1998, where she sang alongside Aretha Franklin, Celine Dion, Shania Twain, Gloria Estefan, and Carole King. Carey began conceptualizing a film project All That Glitters, later re-titled to simply Glitter (2001), and wrote songs for other projects, such as Men in Black (1997) and How the Grinch Stole Christmas (2000). After Glitter fell into developmental hell, Carey postponed the project and began writing material for a new album. Sony Music executives insisted she prepare a greatest hits collection in time for the holiday season. The album, titled #1's (1998), featured a cover of Brenda K. Starr's "I Still Believe" and a duet with Whitney Houston, "When You Believe", which was included on the soundtrack for The Prince of Egypt (1998). #1's became a phenomenon in Japan, selling over one million copies in its opening week, making Carey the only international artist to accomplish this feat. It sold over 3.25 million copies in Japan in its first three months and holds the record as the best-selling album by a non-Asian artist.

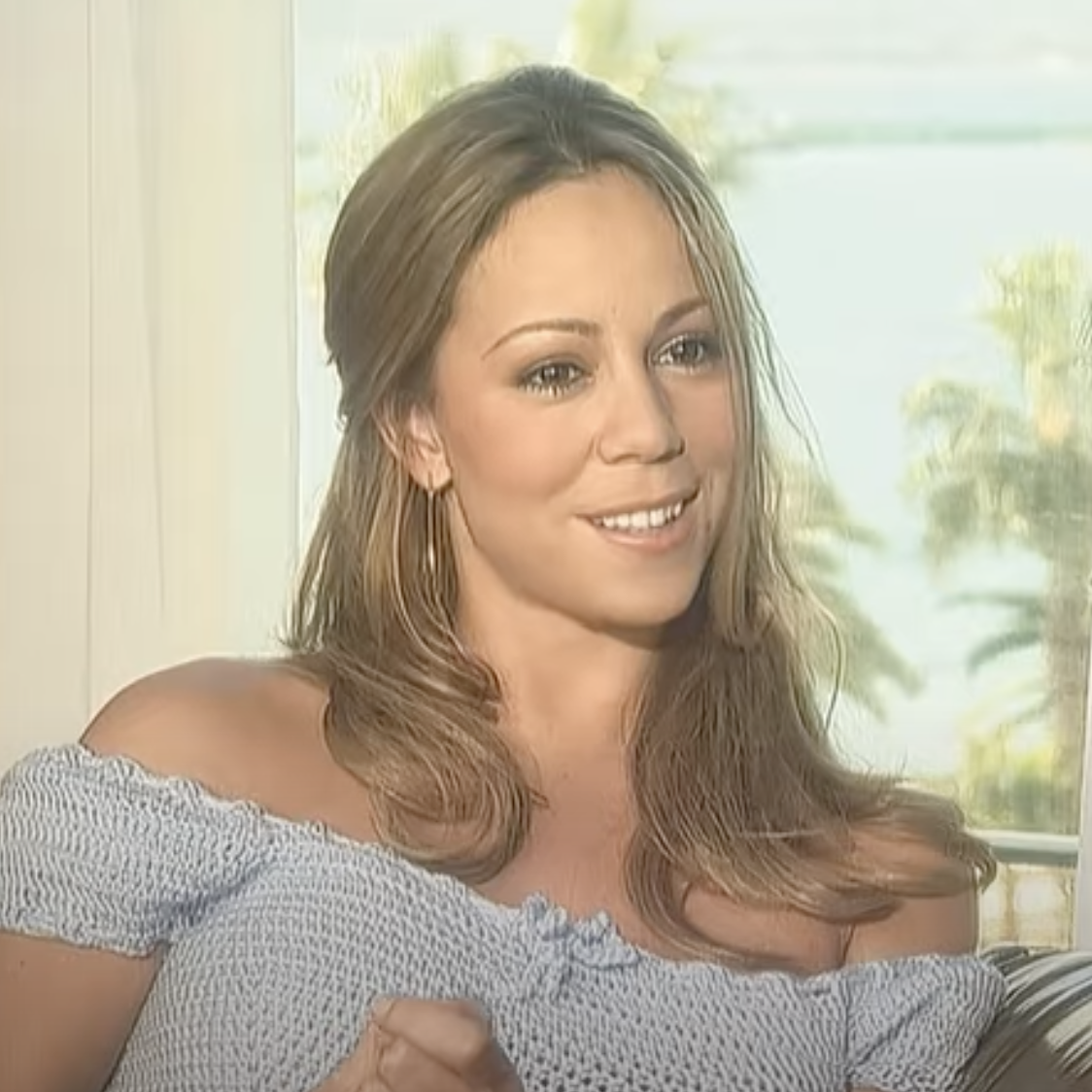
Carey being interviewed in Cannes in 2000

With only one album left to fulfill her contract with Sony, and with a desire to separate herself professionally from the record label her ex-husband still headed, Carey completed the album in three months in mid-1999. Titled Rainbow, the album found Carey exploring with producers whom she had not worked with before. Rainbow became Carey's first album to not feature a collaboration with her longtime writing partner, Walter Afanasieff. She instead chose to work with David Foster and Diane Warren. "Heartbreaker" (featuring Jay-Z) and "Thank God I Found You" (featuring Joe and 98 Degrees) both topped the Billboard Hot 100, while her rendition of Phil Collins's "Against All Odds (Take a Look at Me Now)" with Irish boy band Westlife became her second number-one song on the UK charts. Rainbow was released on November 2, 1999, to the highest first-week sales of her career at the time, and debuted at number two on the Billboard 200.

Carey's tense relationship with Columbia grew increasingly fractious; she began posting messages on her website, sharing inside information with fans on the dispute, as well as instructing them to request "Can't Take That Away (Mariah's Theme)" on radio stations. Ultimately, the song was only given a very limited and low-promotion release. Critical reception of Rainbow was generally positive, with the general consensus finding: "what began on Butterfly as a departure ends up on Rainbow a progression – perhaps the first compelling proof of Carey's true colors as an artist." Though a commercial success, Rainbow became Carey's lowest selling album at that point in her career. For her success in the 1990s, Carey received Billboard's Artist of the Decade Award and the World Music Award for Best-Selling Pop Female Artist of the Millennium.

=== 2001–2004: Personal and professional setbacks, Glitter and Charmbracelet ===
After parting from Columbia Records, Carey signed an unprecedented $80 million five-album recording contract with Virgin Records (EMI Records) in April 2001. Glitter was a musical departure, recreating a 1980s post-disco era to accompany the film, set in 1983. Carey was given full conceptual and creative control over the project. She said that Columbia had regarded her as a commodity, with her separation from Mottola exacerbating her relations with label executives. Carey's three-year relationship with Latin singer Luis Miguel ended. In July 2001, Carey suffered a physical and emotional breakdown. She began posting disturbing messages on her website and behaved erratically in live promotional outings. On July 19, Carey made a surprise appearance on the MTV program Total Request Live (TRL). As the show's host Carson Daly began taping following a commercial break, she came out pushing an ice cream cart while wearing a large men's shirt and began a striptease that revealed a tight ensemble. She credited exhaustion for the appearance going awry. Days later, Carey posted irregular voice notes on her website. On July 26, she was hospitalized due to exhaustion and a "physical and emotional breakdown". Carey was admitted to a hospital in Connecticut and remained under doctor's care for two weeks, followed by an extended absence from the public.

Virgin Records and 20th Century Fox delayed the release of Glitter and its soundtrack; both were critically panned and commercially unsuccessful. The soundtrack became Carey's lowest-selling album to that point. The lead single, "Loverboy", was subject to controversy following confirmed reports that Mottola stole the idea of sampling the singer's original planned sample in favor of Jennifer Lopez's song "I'm Real", forcing Carey to change the song's composition. "Loverboy" peaked at number two on the Billboard Hot 100, ending Carey's streak after eleven consecutive years atop the chart. The St. Louis Post-Dispatch condemned Glitter as "an absolute mess that'll go down as an annoying blemish on [her] career". She attributed the poor performance to her state of mind, its postponement and the soundtrack having been released on September 11. In the following decades, the Glitter soundtrack has developed a cult following and began to attract reappraisal from critics, with Complex referring to the album as "the perfect '80s tribute".

Carey's record deal with Virgin Records was bought out for $28 million. Carey described her time at Virgin "a complete and total stress-fest." She signed a contract with The Island Def Jam Music Group, valued at more than $24 million, and launched the record label MonarC. Her father, Alfred Roy, with whom she had had little contact since childhood, died of cancer that year. The song "Sunflowers for Alfred Roy" from Charmbracelet is dedicated to his memory. In 2002, Carey performed "The Star-Spangled Banner" at the Super Bowl XXXVI; Rolling Stone and Billboard have both retrospectively ranked it among the Super Bowl's best renditions of the national anthem. She was also cast in the independent film WiseGirls alongside Mira Sorvino and Melora Walters, who co-starred as waitresses at a mobster-operated restaurant. It premiered at the Sundance Film Festival, and received negative reviews, though Carey's performance was praised. Roger Friedman of Fox News described her as "a Thelma Ritter for the new millennium", and wrote, "Her line delivery is sharp and she manages to get the right laughs."

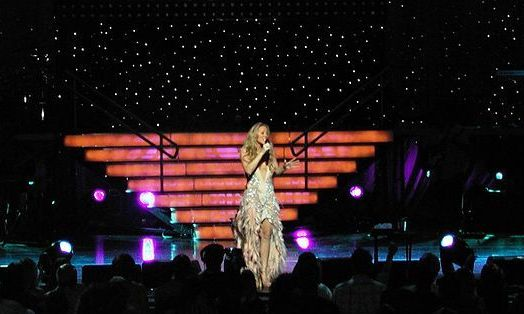
Carey performing "Hero" during her Charmbracelet World Tour in September 2003

In December 2002, Carey released her ninth studio album, Charmbracelet, which she said marked "a new lease on life" for her. Sales of Charmbracelet were moderate and the quality of Carey's vocals came under criticism. Joan Anderson from The Boston Globe declared the album "the worst of her career, and revealed a voice [that is] no longer capable of either gravity-defying gymnastics or soft coos", while AllMusic editor Stephen Thomas Erlewine wrote, "Mariah's voice is shot, sounding in tatters throughout the record. She can no longer coo or softly croon nor can she perform her trademark gravity-defying vocal runs." To support the album, Carey embarked on the Charmbracelet World Tour, spanning North America and East Asia over three months. While smaller venues were booked throughout the tour's stateside leg, Carey performed in stadiums in Asia and Europe. In the United Kingdom, it was her first tour to feature shows outside London. The tour garnered generally positive reviews, with many praising the production and Carey's vocals. In 2003, Carey featured on Busta Rhymes's "I Know What You Want".

=== 2005–2007: Resurgence with The Emancipation of Mimi ===
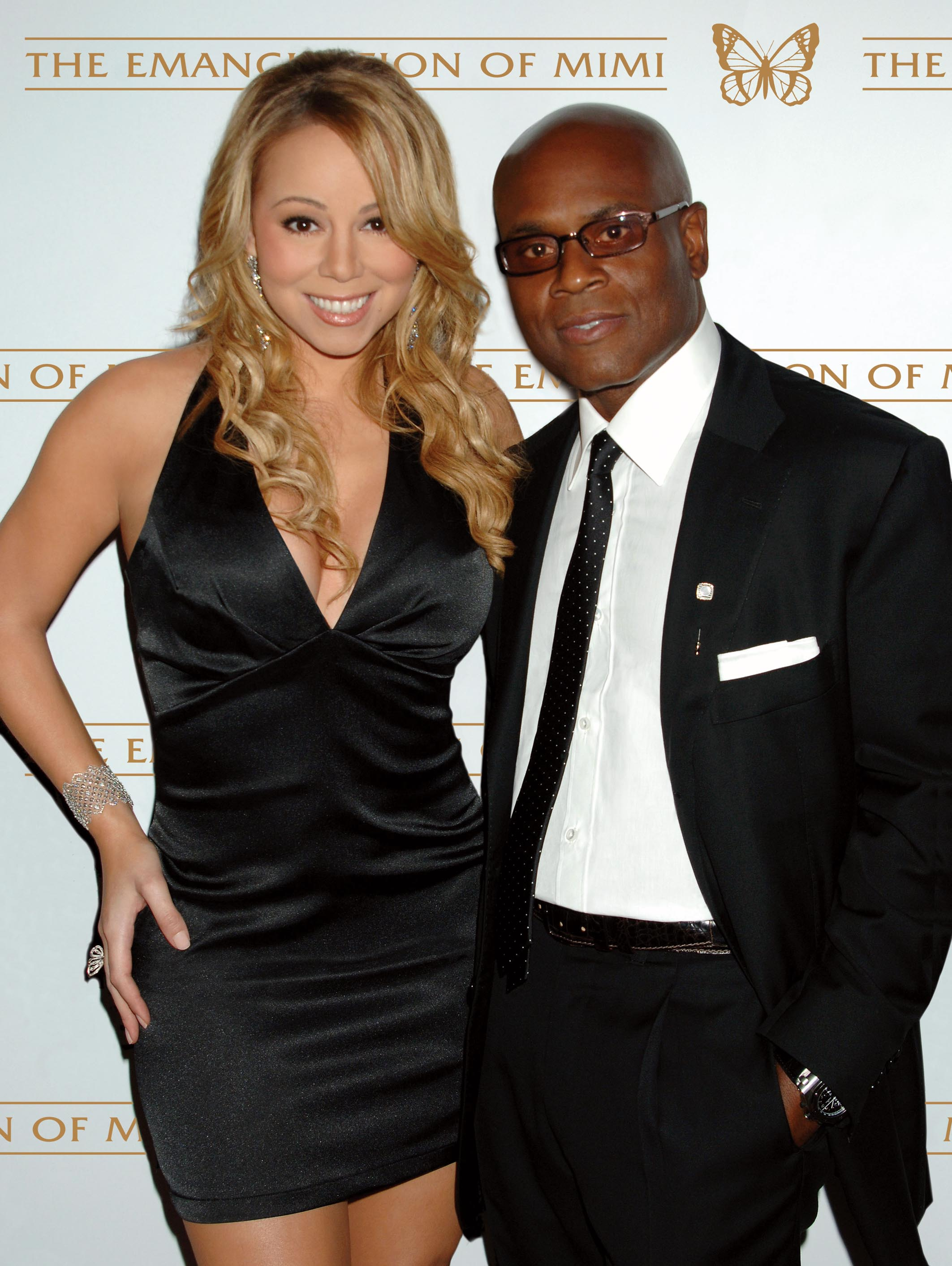
Carey, pictured with former The Island Def Jam Music Group head L.A. Reid, at the release party for The Emancipation of Mimi in 2005

Carey's tenth studio album, The Emancipation of Mimi in 2005, was produced with the Neptunes, Kanye West and Carey's longtime collaborator, Jermaine Dupri. She described the album as "very much like a party record". The Emancipation of Mimi topped the charts in the United States, becoming her fifth number-one album and first since Butterfly (1997), and was warmly accepted by critics. Caroline Sullivan of The Guardian defined it as "cool, focused and urban [... some of] the first Mariah Carey tunes in years which I wouldn't have to be paid to listen to again," while USA Today's Elysa Gardner wrote, "The [songs] truly reflect the renewed confidence of a songbird who has taken her shots and kept on flying."

The album's second single, "We Belong Together", became a "career re-defining" song for Carey, after a relatively unsuccessful period and a point when many critics had considered her career over. Music critics heralded the song as her "return to form," as well as the "return of The Voice," while many felt it would revive "faith" in Carey's potential as a balladeer. "We Belong Together" broke several records in the United States and became Carey's sixteenth chart topper on the Billboard Hot 100. After staying at number one for fourteen non-consecutive weeks, it became the second-longest-running number one song in US chart history at the time, behind Carey's "One Sweet Day". "We Belong Together" topped the Year-End Hot 100 Chart of 2005, a first for Carey. By the end of the 2000s, Billboard listed it as the "Song of the Decade", making Carey the only artist to achieve the feat twice. The song broke several airplay records, and according to Nielsen BDS, and gathered both the largest one-day and one-week audiences in history.

During the week of September 25, 2005, Carey set another record, becoming the first woman to occupy the first two spots atop the Hot 100, as "We Belong Together" remained at number one, and her next single, "Shake It Off", moved into the number two spot (Ashanti had topped the chart in 2002 while being a featured singer on the number two single). The album was re-released as The Ultra Platinum Edition, from which "Don't Forget About Us" became her seventeenth number-one in the United States.

The Emancipation of Mimi earned ten Grammy Award nominations: eight in 2006 for the original release, the most received by Carey in a single year, and two in 2007 for the Ultra Platinum Edition. Carey won Best Contemporary R&B Album for The Emancipation of Mimi and Best Female R&B Vocal Performance and Best R&B Song for "We Belong Together". The Emancipation of Mimi was 2005's best-selling album in the United States, with nearly five million units sold. It was the first album by a solo female artist to become the year's best-selling album within the country since Alanis Morissette's Jagged Little Pill in 1996 and made Carey the second woman after Whitney Houston with a top-selling album in two separate years. At the end of 2005, the International Federation of the Phonographic Industry (IFPI) reported that The Emancipation of Mimi had sold more than 7.7 million copies globally, and was the second-best-selling album of the year after Coldplay's X&Y. It has since sold 12 million copies worldwide. In support of the album, Carey embarked on her first headlining tour in three years, named The Adventures of Mimi after a "Carey-centric fan's" music diary. The tour spanned 40 dates, with 32 in the United States and Canada, two in Africa, and six in Japan. It received warm reception from music critics and concert goers, many of which lauded Carey's vocals.

=== 2008–2009: E=MC², Memoirs of an Imperfect Angel, and Precious ===
In early 2007, Carey began to work on her eleventh studio album, E=MC². Although the album was well received by some critics, others criticized it for being very similar to the formula used on The Emancipation of Mimi. Two weeks before the album's release, "Touch My Body", the record's lead single, reached the top position on the Billboard Hot 100, becoming Carey's eighteenth number one and making her the solo artist with the most number one singles in history, pushing her past Elvis Presley according to the magazine's revised methodology. Additionally, it gave Carey her 79th week atop the Hot 100, tying her with Presley as the artist with the most weeks at number one in the chart's history."

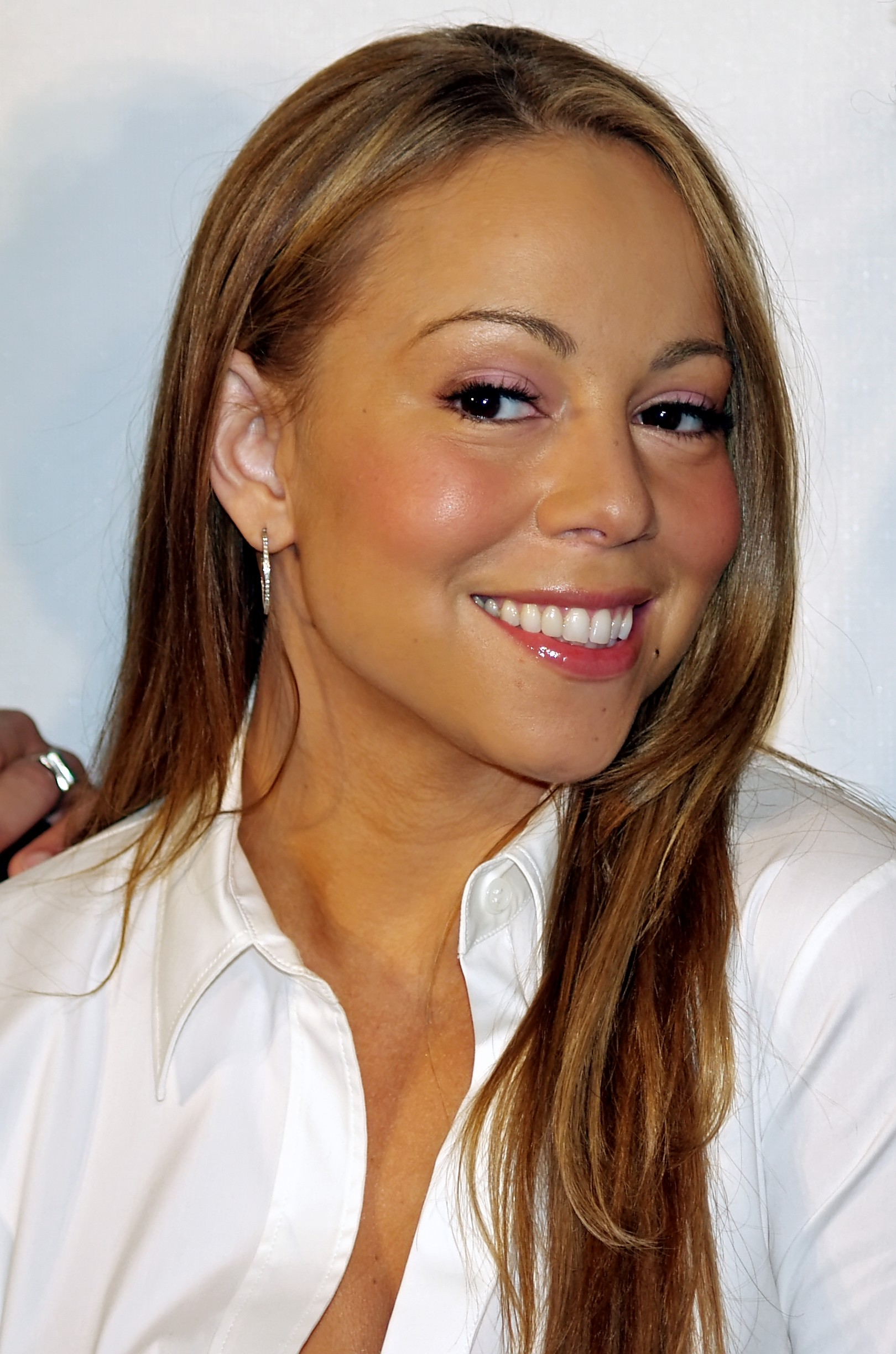
Carey at the 2008 Tribeca Film Festival

E=MC² debuted at number one on the Billboard 200 with 463,000 copies sold, the biggest opening week sales of her career. In 2008, Carey also played one of the lead roles in Tennessee. Since the album's release, Carey had planned to embark on an extensive tour in support of E=MC². However, the tour was suddenly cancelled in early December 2008. Carey later stated that she had been pregnant during that time period and suffered a miscarriage, prompting the tour's cancellation. On January 20, 2009, Carey performed "Hero" at the Neighborhood Inaugural Ball after Barack Obama was sworn as the first African-American president of the United States. On July 7, 2009, Carey—alongside Trey Lorenz—performed her version of "I'll Be There" at the memorial service for Michael Jackson.

In 2009, she appeared as a social worker in Precious, the movie adaptation of the 1996 novel Push by Sapphire. The film garnered mostly positive reviews from critics, also for Carey's performance. Variety described her acting as "pitch-perfect". In January 2010, Carey won the Breakthrough Actress Performance Award for her role in Precious at the Palm Springs International Film Festival.

On September 25, 2009, Carey's twelfth studio album, Memoirs of an Imperfect Angel, was released. Reception for the album was mostly mixed; Stephen Thomas Erlewine of AllMusic called it "her most interesting album in a decade," while Jon Caramanica from The New York Times criticized Carey's vocal performances, complaining she overused softer vocal registers at the expense of her more powerful lower and upper registers. Commercially, the album debuted at number three on the Billboard 200 with first week sales of 168,000 copies. "Obsessed" served as the lead single and peaked at number seven in the US, becoming Carey's 27th top-ten entry within the nation. Its follow-up single, a cover of Foreigner's "I Want to Know What Love Is", broke airplay records in Brazil. The song spent 27 weeks atop the Brasil Hot 100, making it the longest running number-one song in the chart's history. "It's a Wrap", another track from the album, experienced a revival on TikTok in February 2023.

On December 31, 2009, Carey embarked on her seventh concert tour, Angels Advocate Tour, which visited the United States and Canada and ended on September 26, 2010. A planned remix album of Memoirs of an Imperfect Angel, titled Angels Advocate, was slated for a March 30, 2010, release but was eventually cancelled after Island Def Jam decided to instead distribute "Up Out My Face" with Nicki Minaj and "Angels Cry" with Ne-Yo as stand-alone releases.

=== 2010–2014: Merry Christmas II You and Me. I Am Mariah... The Elusive Chanteuse ===
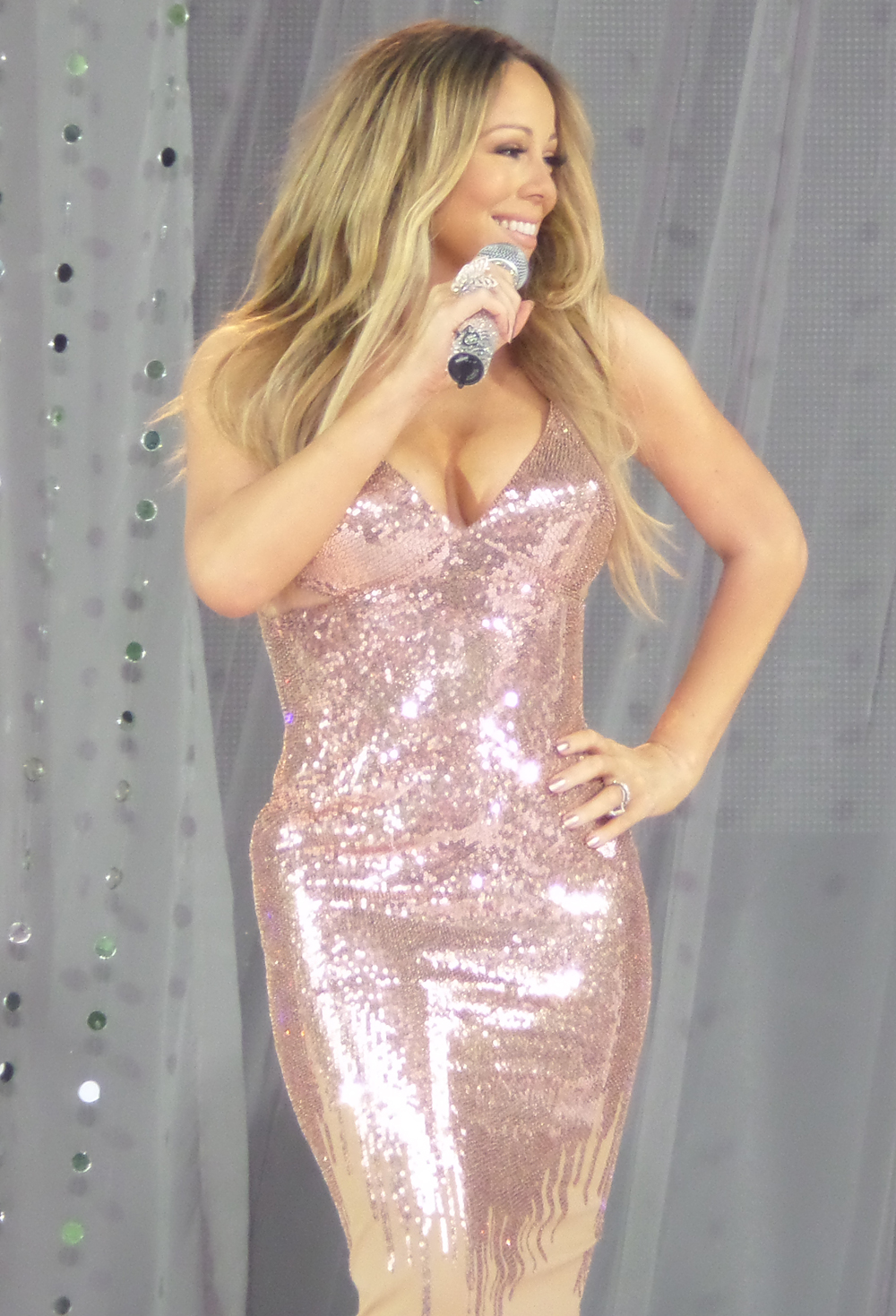
Carey performing on Good Morning America in May 2013

Following the cancellation of Angels Advocate, it was announced that Carey would return to the studio to start work on her thirteenth studio album. It was later revealed that it would be her second Christmas album, and follow-up to Merry Christmas. The release date for the album, titled Merry Christmas II You, was November 2, 2010. Merry Christmas II You debuted at number four on the Billboard 200 and number one on the R&B/Hip-Hop Albums chart, making it only the second Christmas album to top this chart. In February 2011, she recorded a duet with Tony Bennett for his Duets II album, titled "When Do The Bells Ring For Me?", and re-recorded "All I Want for Christmas Is You" with Justin Bieber as a duet for his Christmas album, Under the Mistletoe. In November that year, Carey was included in the remix to the mixtape single "Warning" by Uncle Murda; the remix also features 50 Cent and Young Jeezy. Later that month, Carey released a duet with John Legend titled "When Christmas Comes", originally part of Merry Christmas II You.

On March 1, 2012, Carey performed at New York City's Gotham Hall; her first time performing since her pregnancy. She also performed a three-song set at a special fundraiser for US President Barack Obama held in New York's Plaza Hotel. A new song titled "Bring It On Home", which Carey wrote for the event to show her support for Obama's re-election campaign, was also performed. In August 2012, she released a stand-alone single, "Triumphant (Get 'Em)", featuring rappers Rick Ross and Meek Mill. Carey joined the judging panel of the twelfth season of American Idol, earning a reported $18 million for the season. In 2013, Carey appeared in Lee Daniels's film The Butler and had a guest role voicing as a redneck character on the adult animated series American Dad!. In February 2013, she released "Almost Home", for the soundtrack of The Walt Disney Studios film Oz the Great and Powerful.

For her fourteenth studio album, Me. I Am Mariah... The Elusive Chanteuse, Carey worked with producers including DJ Clue?, Randy Jackson, R. Kelly, David Morales and The-Dream. The lead single, "#Beautiful", featuring singer Miguel, was released on May 6, 2013, and peaked at number 15 on the Hot 100. Carey taped a performance of "#Beautiful" along with a medley of her greatest hits on May 15, 2013. This taping aired on the American Idol season finale the following day. After multiple delays, the album was released on May 27, 2014, and it debuted at number three on the Billboard 200.

In October 2014, Carey announced an annual residency show All I Want for Christmas Is You: A Night of Joy and Festivity. Originally performed at the Beacon Theatre in New York City, the residency began on December 15, 2014, and ended in 2019.

=== 2015–2017: #1 to Infinity, television and film projects ===
On January 30, 2015, it was announced that Carey had left Universal Music Group's Def Jam Recordings to reunite with L.A. Reid and Sony Music via Epic Records. Carey also announced her new #1 to Infinity residency at The Colosseum at Caesars Palace in Las Vegas the same month. To coincide with the residency, Carey released #1 to Infinity, a greatest hits compilation album containing all of her eighteen Billboard Hot 100 number one singles at the time, along with a new recording, "Infinity", which was released as a single on April 27. In 2015 Carey made her directorial debut in the Hallmark Channel Christmas film A Christmas Melody, in which she also performed as one of the main characters. She also hosted a live special with the same network, Mariah Carey's Merriest Christmas, following the premiere for the film. In December 2015, Carey announced The Sweet Sweet Fantasy Tour which spanned a total of 27-dates beginning in March 2016, marking Carey's first major tour of mainland Europe in 13 years. Four stops included shows in South Africa. The tour grossed $30.3 million.

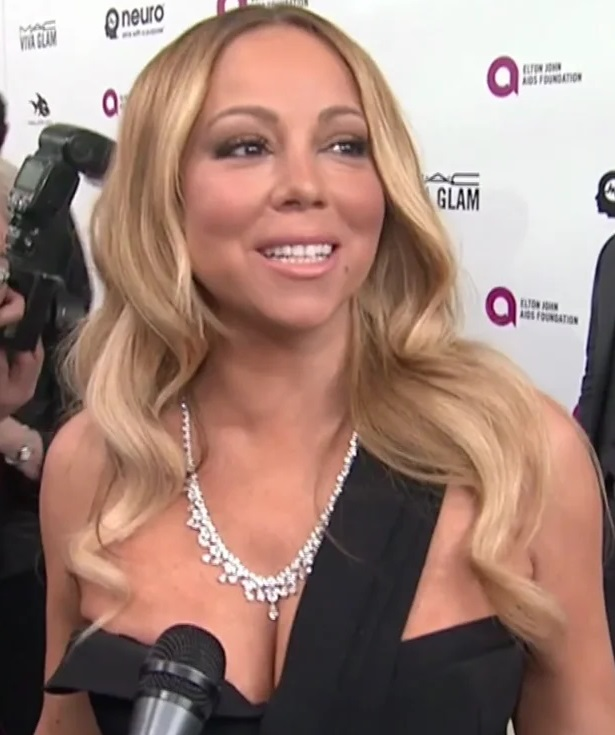
Carey attending Elton John's AIDS Foundation Academy Award Party in February 2016

On March 15, 2016, Carey announced that she was filming Mariah's World, a docu-series for the E! network documenting her Sweet Sweet Fantasy tour and her wedding planning process. Carey told The New York Times, "I thought it would be a good opportunity to kind of, like, show my personality and who I am, even though I feel like my real fans have an idea of who I am... A lot of people have misperceptions about this and that." The series premiered on December 4, 2016. Carey guest starred on the musical drama Empire and sang the song "Infamous" featuring Jussie Smollett. On December 5, 2016, Carey participated in the VH1 Divas Holiday: Unsilent Night benefit concert, alongside Vanessa Williams, Chaka Khan, Patti LaBelle, and Teyana Taylor. On December 31, 2016, Carey's performance on Dick Clark's New Year's Rockin' Eve in Times Square received worldwide attention after technical difficulties caused her in-ear monitors to malfunction, resulting in what The New York Times referred to as a "performance train wreck". She said her inability to hear the music without in-ear auditory feedback caused the mishap. Carey's representatives and Dick Clark Productions placed blame on each other.

On February 3, 2017, Carey released the single "I Don't" featuring YG. Later that month, she voiced the Mayor of Gotham City in the animated film The Lego Batman Movie. In July 2017, Carey made a cameo in the comedy film Girls Trip and embarked on a tour with Lionel Richie, titled, All the Hits Tour. She was also featured in the official remix for French Montana's single "Unforgettable", alongside Swae Lee. In October 2017, Carey released a new soundtrack single, "The Star", for the movie of the same name. She also voiced a hen named Rebecca in the film. The song was nominated for the Best Original Song at the 75th Golden Globe Awards. Carey additionally developed an animated Christmas film, Mariah Carey's All I Want For Christmas Is You, for which she recorded an original song called "Lil' Snowman". The film was released direct-to-video on November 14, 2017. On December 31, 2017, Carey returned to perform on Dick Clark's New Year's Rockin' Eve after the technical difficulties that hindered her previous performance, in what The New York Times described as a "made-for-television act of pop culture redemption".

=== 2018–2024: Caution, The Meaning of Mariah Carey, and anniversary album reissues ===
In July 2018, Carey embarked on a new Las Vegas residency, the Butterfly Returns, which received critical acclaim. Following the residency, she embarked on her Mariah Carey: Live in Concert tour in Asia and returned to Europe with her All I Want for Christmas Is You concert series. In September 2018, Carey announced plans to release her fifteenth studio album later in the year. The album's lead single, "With You", was released in October and it became Carey's highest-charting non-holiday song on the US Adult Contemporary chart since 2005. The album, titled Caution, was released on November 16, 2018, and received universal acclaim from critics. By December 2018, the album had been featured on numerous year-end lists by music critics and publications.

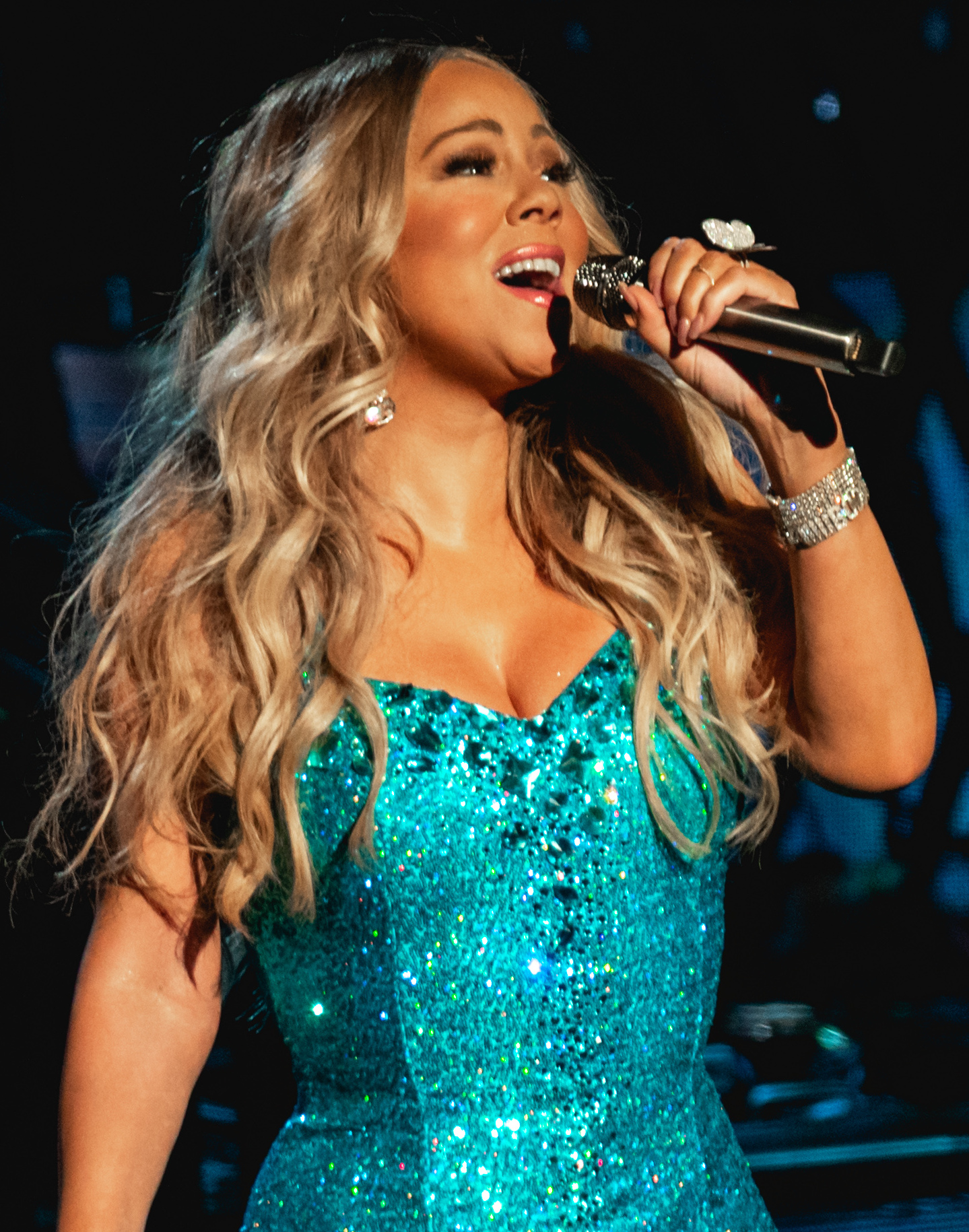
Carey performing on her Caution World Tour in Amsterdam, June 2019

In February 2019, Carey commenced the Caution World Tour in support of the album. On September 18, 2019, she released "In the Mix", the theme song for the ABC sitcom Mixed-ish. On November 1, 2019, Carey re-released her holiday album Merry Christmas for its 25th anniversary. In December, a mini-documentary titled Mariah Carey Is Christmas!, charting the creation and subsequent cultural legacy of "All I Want for Christmas Is You", premiered on Amazon Music. Peaking at number one on the Billboard Hot 100 the same year, the song became Carey's nineteenth chart-topper in the US.

Carey celebrated the 30th anniversary of her debut album through 2020, in a promotional campaign billed "#MC30", with weekly releases including digital EPs, vinyls, bonus cuts, live performances and unreleased footage. A live EP, The Live Debut – 1990, was released on July 17, 2020. Her memoir, The Meaning of Mariah Carey which was co-written with Michaela Angela Davis, was published in September of the same year. The memoir reached number one on The New York Times Best Seller list after its first week of release. On October 2, 2020, Carey released a compilation album titled The Rarities, which includes rare and unreleased songs that Carey recorded at various stages of her career. At the end of October, Carey was featured on Busta Rhymes's single "Where I Belong". Carey's 2020 Christmas special, Mariah Carey's Magical Christmas Special, premiered on December 4, 2020, on Apple TV+ along with a soundtrack. A new version of Carey's 2010 song "Oh Santa!", featuring Ariana Grande and Jennifer Hudson, was released as a single the same day. "All I Want for Christmas Is You" topped the UK chart for the first time that month, becoming her third number one in the nation, with an unprecedented 69 weeks in its top 40 before reaching the summit.

In July 2021, Carey was featured on the track "Somewhat Loved" from Jimmy Jam and Terry Lewis's debut studio album Jam & Lewis: Volume One. On November 5, 2021, Carey released "Fall in Love at Christmas", featuring Khalid and Kirk Franklin, for her second Christmas special, Mariah's Christmas: The Magic Continues. In March 2022, Carey was featured alongside DJ Khaled on the remix of Latto's single "Big Energy", which interpolates Carey's 1995 single "Fantasy". Later that year, she recorded nine video lessons for MasterClass titled "Mariah Carey Teaches the Voice as an Instrument", for which she re-recorded the 1998 single "The Roof (Back in Time)" alongside Brandy. The collaboration was included on an expanded version of Butterfly, released for the 25th anniversary of the album on September 16. In November, Carey released a children's picture book titled The Christmas Princess, co-written with Michaela Angela Davis and illustrated by Fuuji Takashi. She also served as a co-producer of Some Like It Hot on Broadway theatre, which earned her a nomination for the Tony Award for Best Musical.

On September 8, 2023, Carey released a deluxe version of Music Box in celebration of the album's 30th anniversary. She embarked on her 16-date concert tour, Merry Christmas One and All!, which ran from November 15 to December 17, 2023, in the United States. The tour grossed approximately $30 million and sold more than 200,000 tickets. In 2024, Carey appeared on the remixes of Ariana Grande's "Yes, And?" and Muni Long's "Made for Me". On April 12, she began a new residency at the Dolby Live in Las Vegas titled The Celebration of Mimi. In June, Carey released an expanded edition of Rainbow to coincide with its 25th anniversary. On November 6, 2024, she began her annual Mariah Carey's Christmas Time tour. A 30th anniversary edition of Merry Christmas was also released.

=== 2025–present: Here for It All ===
Carey performing at the Sandringham Estate, August 2025

In May 2025, Carey released a 20th anniversary edition of The Emancipation of Mimi. On June 27, she was featured alongside Grande on Barbra Streisand's album The Secret of Life: Partners, Volume Two, on a song titled "One Heart, One Voice".

On September 26, 2025, Carey released her sixteenth studio album, titled Here for It All. The album debuted at number seven on the Billboard 200, and was her first studio release through Gamma as part of a multi-album deal, which she described as "owning my narrative and creating freely on my own terms". For Here for It All, Carey worked with musicians such as Anderson .Paak, Rogét Chahayed and the gospel group the Clark Sisters. The lead single, "Type Dangerous", debuted at number 95 on the Billboard Hot 100, becoming Carey's 50th entry on the chart. Its music video won the MTV Video Music Award for Best R&B Video at the 2025 MTV Video Music Awards, marking her first win; later that night, she also received the Michael Jackson Video Vanguard Award.

On February 6, 2026, Carey performed a cover of Domenico Modugno's "Nel blu, dipinto di blu (Volare)" alongside "Nothing Is Impossible", the fourth single from Here for It All, at the opening ceremony of the 2026 Winter Olympics, held in Milan. On March 27, 2026, she released a two-track EP for "Nothing Is Impossible", featuring the Winter Olympics medley and a new orchestral arrangement of the song with the RoyNoyz orchestra. Later that year, Carey released expanded editions of Daydream and the Glitter soundtrack, in celebration of the albums' respective 30th and 25th anniversaries. On November 9, 2026, Carey announced the Firefly Tour, which will feature festival shows in June and July 2027.

== Artistry ==
=== Influences ===
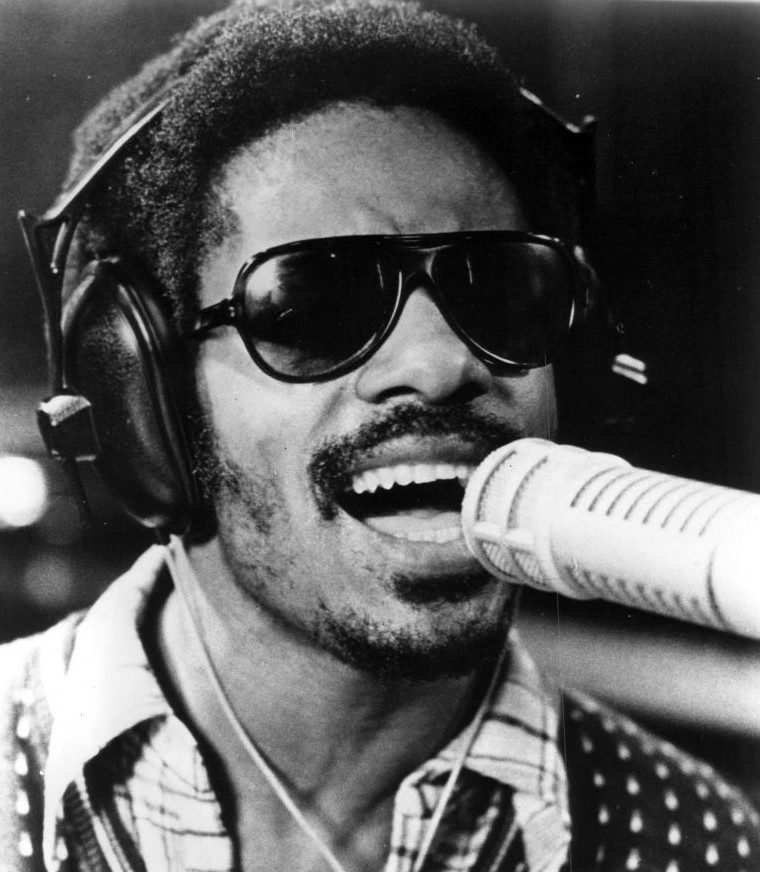
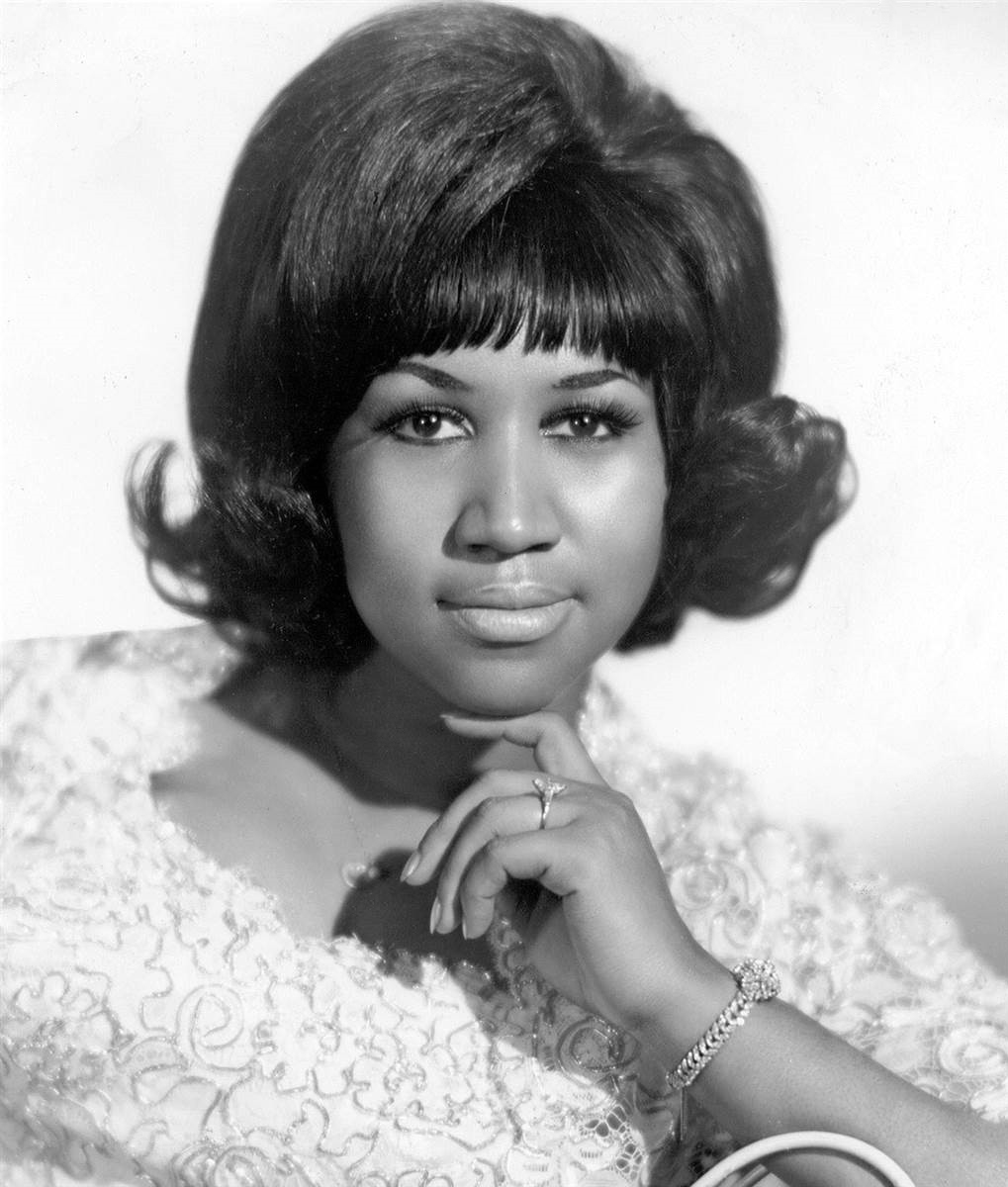
Carey's major influences include Stevie Wonder (left) and Aretha Franklin (right).

Carey has said that from childhood she has been influenced by Billie Holiday, Sarah Vaughan as well as R&B and soul musicians including Al Green, Stevie Wonder, Gladys Knight, Aretha Franklin, and George Michael. Her music contains strong influences of gospel music, and she credits the Clark Sisters, Shirley Caesar, and Edwin Hawkins as the most influential in her early years. When Carey incorporated hip-hop into her sound, speculation arose that she was making an attempt to take advantage of the genre's popularity, but she told Newsweek, "People just don't understand. I grew up with this music." She has expressed appreciation for rappers such as the Sugarhill Gang, Eric B. & Rakim, the Wu-Tang Clan, The Notorious B.I.G. and Mobb Deep, with whom she collaborated on "The Roof (Back in Time)". Carey was heavily influenced by Minnie Riperton, and began experimenting with the whistle register due to her original practice of the range.

During Carey's career, her vocal and musical style, along with her level of success, has been compared to Whitney Houston, whom she has also cited as an influence. Carey and her peers, according to Garry Mulholland, are "the princesses of wails... virtuoso vocalists who blend chart-oriented pop with mature MOR torch song." Author and writer Lucy O'Brien attributed the comeback of Barbra Streisand's "old-fashioned showgirl" to Carey and Celine Dion, and described them and Houston as "groomed, airbrushed and overblown to perfection". Carey's musical transition and use of more revealing clothing during the late 1990s were, in part, initiated to distance herself from this image, and she subsequently said that most of her early work was "schmaltzy MOR". Some have noted that unlike Houston and Dion, Carey writes and produces her own music.

=== Musical style ===
Carey gained public perception as a balladeer with her first few releases. Jim Faber of the New York Daily News stated that "For Carey, vocalizing is all about the performance, not the emotions that inspired it. Singing, to her, represents a physical challenge, not an emotional unburdening." While reviewing Music Box, Stephen Holden from Rolling Stone commented that Carey sang with "sustained passion," while Arion Berger of Entertainment Weekly wrote that during some vocal moments, Carey becomes "too overwhelmed to put her passion into words". In 2001, The Village Voice wrote that "Carey's Strawberry Shortcake soul still provides the template with which teen-pop cuties draw curlicues around those centerless [Diane] Warren ballads." Following her divorce with Tommy Mottola, Carey broke free of adult contemporary arrangements in favor of what Alex Macpherson of The Guardian described as "a lovingly crafted, hip-hop-inflected quiet storm". Carey often records her layered background vocals, which have been described as "a swooning bank of a hundred Mariahs". The singer has said that "it's because I started out as a backup singer and doing sessions as a background vocalist learning from some of the greatest background vocalists, and also people like Luther Vandross. Growing up, I admired his texture in and of itself but also his use of background vocals".

Carey's output makes use of electronic instruments such as drum machines, keyboards and synthesizers. Many of her songs contain piano-driven melodies, as she was given piano lessons at age six. Carey said that she cannot read sheet music and prefers to collaborate with a pianist when composing her material, but feels that it is easier to experiment with faster and less-conventional melodies and chord progressions using this technique. Carey incorporates several ranges of production and instrumentation into her music, though she has maintained that her voice has always been her most important asset: "My voice is my instrument; it always has been."

Carey began commissioning remixes of her material early in her career and helped to spearhead the practice of recording entirely new vocals for remixes. Disc jockey David Morales has collaborated with Carey on several occasions, starting with "Dreamlover" (1993), which popularized the tradition of remixing R&B songs into house records, and which Slant Magazine named one of the greatest dance songs. From "Fantasy" (1995) onward, Carey enlisted both hip-hop and house producers to re-structure her album compositions. Entertainment Weekly included two remixes of "Fantasy" on a list of Carey's greatest recordings compiled in 2005: a National Dance Music Award-winning remix produced by Morales, and a Sean Combs production featuring rapper Ol' Dirty Bastard. The latter has been credited with popularizing the pop and hip-hop collaboration trend that has continued into the 21st century. Combs said that Carey "knows the importance of mixes, so you feel like you're with an artist who appreciates your work—an artist who wants to come up with something with you."

=== Songwriting ===
Love is the subject of the majority of Carey's lyrics, although she has written about themes such as loss, sex, race, abuse and spirituality. Andrew Chan of the University of Texas Press identifies "the purging of private emotions" as the main theme of Carey's ballads, though he believes several others aim to have an "all-purpose feeling" with mass appeal. Carey has said that much of her work is partly autobiographical, but Time magazine's Christopher John Farley wrote: "If only Mariah Carey's music had the drama of her life. Her songs are often sugary and artificial—NutraSweet soul. But her life has passion and conflict," applying it to the first stages of her career. He commented that as her albums progressed, so too her songwriting and music blossomed into more mature and meaningful material.

Carey's songwriting is noted for its "eccentric verbosity". Jeffrey Ingold of Vice argues that her lyrics are "among the most verbose in pop music, filling her catalogue with words like "unyielding" ("Breakdown"), "emblazoned" ("My All") and "rhapsodise" ("Melt Away")". Carey stated that she considers herself a songwriter first. Since the beginning of her career, Carey has repeatedly described herself as a songwriter and producer and emphasized the importance of being acknowledged for these roles. Despite that, she has also admitted having to constantly remind people of her songwriting work, noting that "A lot of people see that whole other image. They see this diva; they see hair, makeup, body, and clothes... They don't think songwriter." Music critics have similarly observed that her songwriting is frequently overlooked despite her success. Upon her induction into the Songwriters Hall of Fame, the institution named her "the all-time most successful female songwriter in chart history". In 2026, The New York Times included Carey on its list "The 30 Greatest Living American Songwriters".

=== Voice and timbre ===
Carey possesses a five-octave vocal range. Regarding her voice type, some critics have described her as a lyric coloratura soprano or just a soprano. Jon Pareles of The New York Times described Carey's lower register as a "rich, husky alto" that extends to "dog-whistle high notes". She once called herself an alto singer. Sasha Frere-Jones of The New Yorker adds her timbre on "Vision of Love" possesses various colors, stating, "Carey's sound changes with nearly every line, mutating from a steely tone to a vibrating growl and then to a humid, breathy coo." Chan believes that Carey moved through several "vocal personas" throughout her discography, like the "stentorian, full-throated belting of her first few albums; the fluid mix of chest and head voice deployed to masterful effect in the mid-1990s; and the delicate, foggy tones and manic cadences that predominated after the turn of the millennium". In an analysis of Carey's voice for ClassicFM, singer Catherine Bott claims that Carey's chest voice could go up "higher in pitch" compared to classical singers.

Her sense of pitch is admired and Jon Pareles adds "she can linger over sensual turns, growl with playful confidence, syncopate like a scat singer... with startlingly exact pitch." Carey claims that she has had nodules on her vocal cords since childhood, enabling her to sing in a higher register than others. However, tiredness and sleep deprivation can affect them due to the nodules, and Carey explained that she went through a lot of practice as a child to maintain a balance during singing. Carey is noted for her vocal improvisation skills.

Towards the late 1990s, she began incorporating breathy vocals into her material. Tim Levell from BBC News described her vocals as "sultry close-to-the-mic breathiness," while USA Today's Elysa Gardner wrote "it's impossible to deny the impact her vocal style, a florid blend of breathy riffing and resonant belting, has had on today's young pop and R&B stars." In an interview, Ron Givens of Entertainment Weekly described it this way, "first, a rippling, soulful ooh comes rolling effortlessly from her throat: alto. Then, after a quick breath, she goes for the stratosphere, with a sound that nearly changes the barometric pressure in the room. In one brief swoop, she seems to squeal and roar at the same time."

Alex Macpherson of The Guardian noted that Carey's voice on Butterfly is "an instrument of texture rather than volume, with pillows of lavishly layered vocals and nuanced phrasing magnifying the emotional intensity of the songs." Randy Jackson said that "It's in the tone, that buttery tone that she has with her voice that is unbelievably amazing and unbelievably identifiable."

=== Stage performances and videos ===
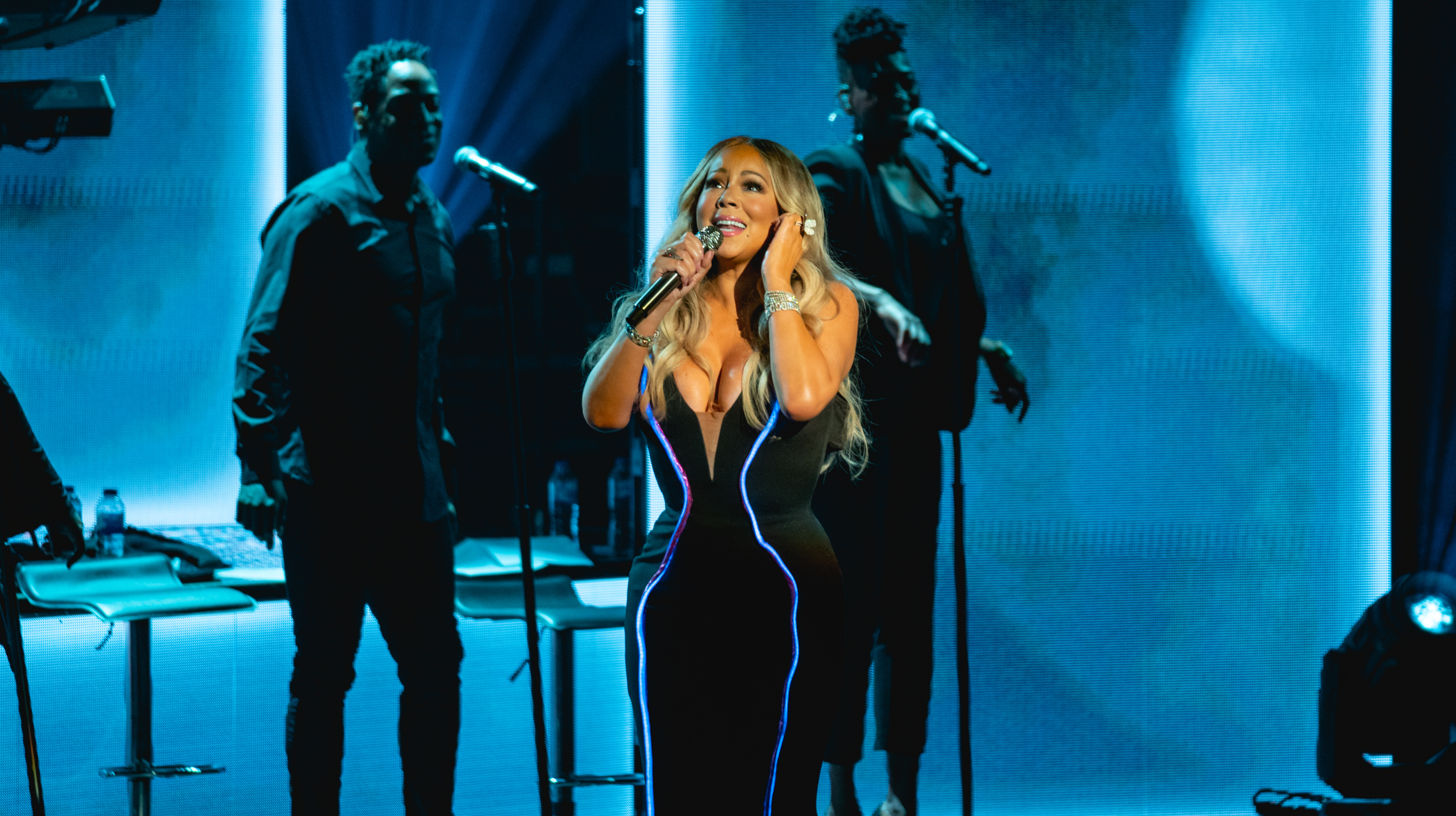
Carey pressing her in-ear monitor, while hitting a whistle note during her Caution World Tour in 2019

Despite being called a "show stopper" and "the 1990s pop phenomenon", Carey suffered from stage fright in her early years in the music industry. One of her earliest performances was at MTV Unplugged, which received positive reception as Carey silenced critics saying her vocals were studio-made. Chan identifies the Milli Vanilli lip syncing controversy as a potential contributor to the initial accusations. The singer received the only standing ovation of the night at the 48th Annual Grammy Awards, after performing the medley of "We Belong Together" and "Fly Like a Bird". In the years following Carey's performance at Dick Clark's New Year's Rockin' Eve 2017, she has faced multiple lip syncing accusations.

Carey is known for being very static during her live performances. Some reviewers credited her stage fright and lack of confidence as the reasoning, while others pointed out that her performances focus on her vocals and the quality of her songs. Her onstage hand gesticulations have usually been mimicked, as the singer has a tendency for "using her hands to point, flutter and sweep through the air as she deftly crests each run". When reviewing Carey's 2014 concert, Michael Lallo wrote that "If you're Mariah, you ... stroke your hair a lot. When a high note is on the horizon, you brace yourself by touching your ear and adopting a pained expression, provoking the crowd into losing its collective mind."

Carey had been open about the fact that she had not been happy with some of her early music videos, and has subsequently been noted for self-directing and co-producing her subsequent videography. The music video for "Fantasy" was the first that Carey directed entirely on her own, and "Honey" pushed Carey further towards hip hop and R&B than before. Its music video gained further attention, as Carey, for the first time in her career, was provocatively dressed, giving viewers a "taste of the freer Mariah." In 2007, author Saul Austerlitz wrote Carey had been "marketed as a whitebread pop princess" in her earlier music videos, adding the plots, directorial styles, clothes, and auras from later videos like "Heartbreaker" were very different and she was displayed as an "R&B diva". Billboard ranked Carey 73rd on its list of "The 100 Greatest Music Video Artists of All Time" in 2020, stating that "over three decades, [Carey] has gone from breezy girl next door, flaunting a denim collection as wide as her vocal range, to secret agent, runaway bride and even her own stalker in a collection of music videos that play like mini-dramas". The music video for "The Roof" was ranked 18th on Slant Magazine's "100 Greatest Music Videos. The music videos for "Honey" and "Heartbreaker" remain among the most expensive ever made, costing over $2 million. In 2021, Carey was honoured at the African American Film Critics Association with a Special Achievement Innovator Award for her "visual storytelling in her music videos and specials".

== Cultural status ==
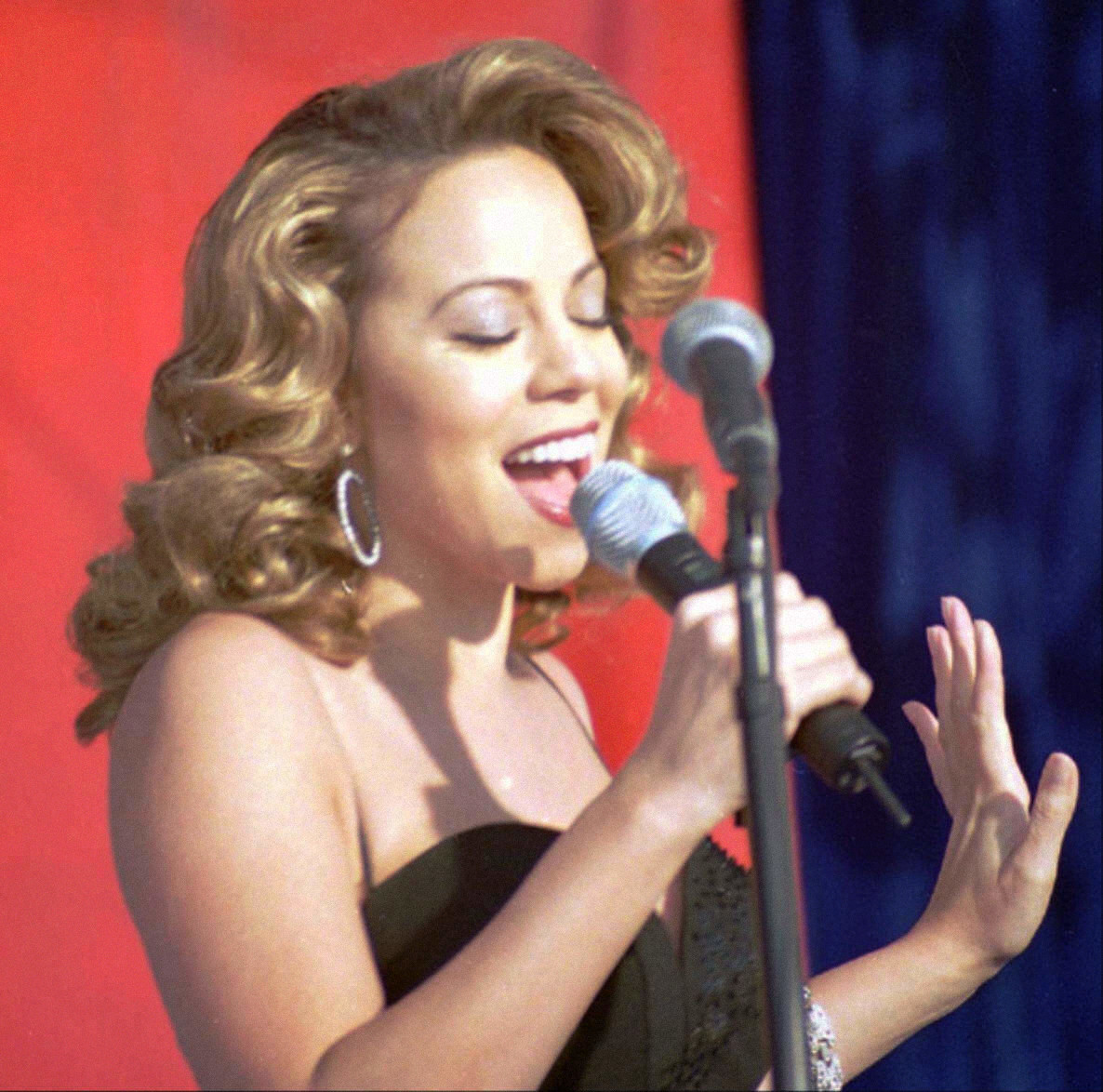
Carey at Edwards Air Force Base during the making of the "I Still Believe" music video in December 1998

Throughout her career, Carey has been called a pop icon, a gay icon, and a fashion icon. The Recording Academy, the Guinness World Records and music critics have dubbed Carey the "Songbird Supreme". She has been labeled a "diva" for her stardom and persona. Her diva persona has received heavy attention, gaining admiration from her fans. Author Lily E. Hirsch argues that while Carey has displayed diva behavior during several incidents in her career, the media's association of the term with her is influenced by gender. Carey's style has often been described as "eccentric" and "over the top". Throughout her career, she has also been used in several social media memes, gaining the "Queen of Shade" title from Elle. Carey's reactions in various interviews have often gone viral, becoming the origin of various memes including "I don't know her".

Carey's public image has undergone significant transformations, often receiving heavy media attention. Early in her career, Carey had a polished image, influenced by Mottola and his control over her career. After their separation, Carey took on a more provocative image in her career and has since been called a sex symbol. Her career has received heavy media attention, particularly during the rollout of her 2001 film, Glitter which became "tabloid legend". Academic Shara Rambarran believes that Carey has matched the media's intense scrutiny and attention on her personal life through "her diva attitude, performance, identity, and music".

Carey's enduring popularity as a musician has received extensive recognition and often been praised for its longevity. She has been credited for her role in breaking down racial barriers in popular culture and facilitating public discourse surrounding multiracialism in the music industry. Carey has also been credited for popularizing the use of melisma amongst her peers and the generation after her, and has often been considered one of the greatest vocalists in pop music. Carey has influenced numerous artists and her music has also been recorded, performed or sampled by a variety of acts. In a 2010 article for The New York Times, David Browne wrote that in the early 1990s, "melisma overtook pop in a way it hadn't before. Mariah Carey's debut hit from 1990, 'Vision of Love', [set] the bar insanely high for notes stretched louder, longer and knottier than most pop fans had ever heard". He added that because of this, various artists have since "built their careers around melisma" including Christina Aguilera, Jennifer Hudson and Beyoncé.

"All I Want for Christmas Is You", as well as its parent album Merry Christmas, have become such a ubiquitous part of wider popular culture that Carey's name became synonymous with the season, and she has since been dubbed the "Queen of Christmas". Multiple publications have referred to Carey as a holiday icon. The singer has often incorporated holiday-themed outfits during her Christmas shows and music videos.

== Achievements ==
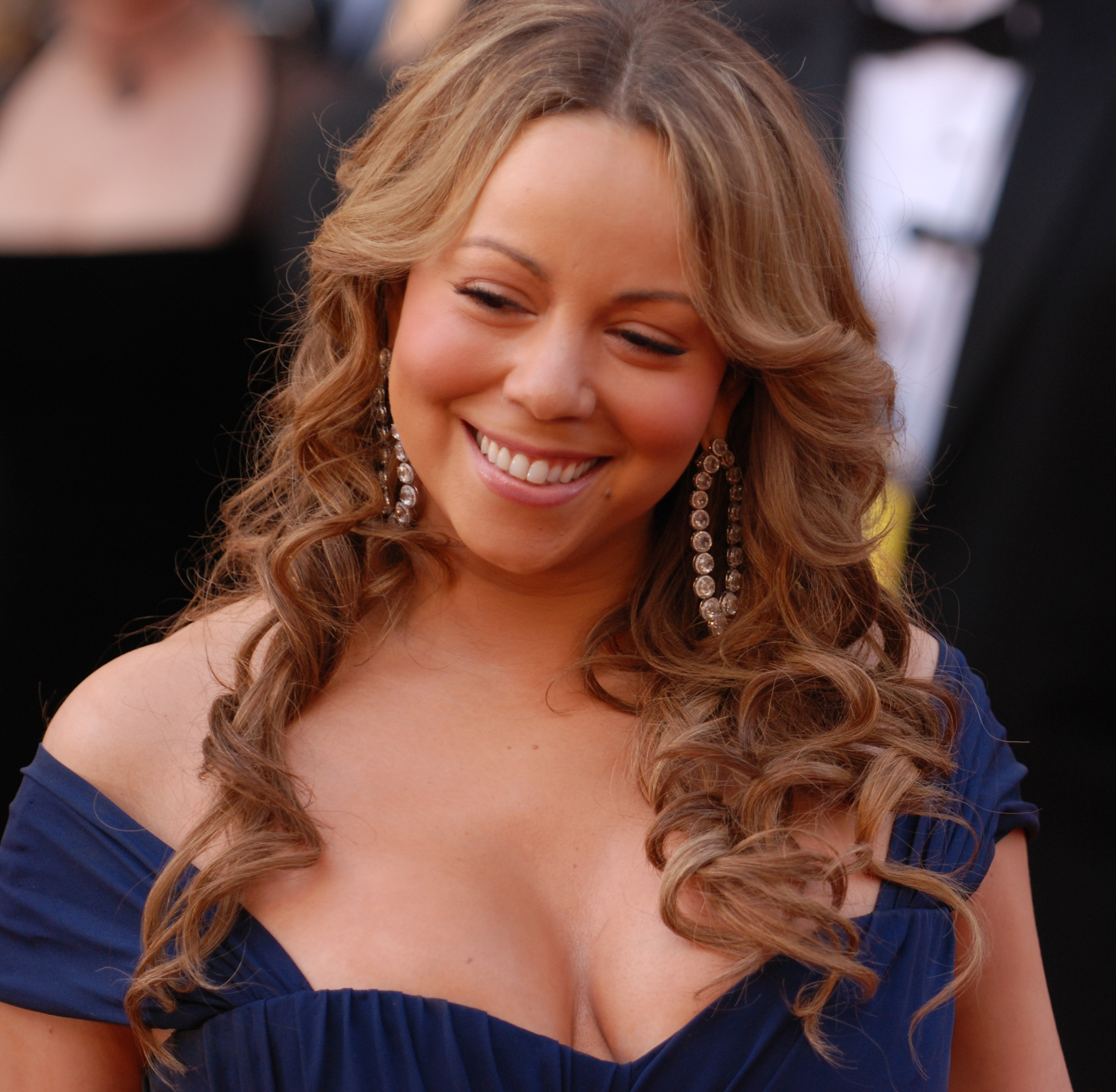
Carey at the 82nd Academy Awards in 2010

Carey has won six Grammy Awards (including a Grammy Global Impact Award), nineteen World Music Awards, ten American Music Awards, and fourteen Billboard Music Awards. Carey is one of the best-selling recording artists in history, with more than 220 million records sold. She is also an inductee of the Songwriters Hall of Fame and The Long Island Music and Entertainment Hall of Fame. Carey was honored with a star on the Hollywood Walk of Fame in 2015, a Billboard Icon Award in 2019, and a BET Ultimate Icon Award in 2025. In 2023, she became one of the first 13 recipients of the Brit Billion Award, for surpassing the milestone one billion streams in the United Kingdom. Time named Carey one of the 100 most influential people in the world in 2008. Rolling Stone ranked her fifth on their list of the "200 Greatest Singers of All Time". The same publication included "Fantasy" in its list of the "500 Greatest Songs of All Time" and The Emancipation of Mimi amongst the "500 Greatest Albums of All Time".

Carey scored three Diamond-certified albums (Music Box, Merry Christmas and Daydream) and one Diamond-certified single ("All I Want for Christmas Is You") by the Recording Industry Association of America (RIAA). Billboard ranks her as the fourth greatest artist of all-time, and the greatest female act, based on her success on the Billboard charts. She holds numerous Billboard Hot 100 records, including the most number-one singles for a soloist (19) and the most weeks atop the chart (101 weeks). Two of her songs, "One Sweet Day" and "All I Want for Christmas Is You", broke the record for the longest-running number-one single in history.

== Other activities ==
=== Business ventures ===
Declining offers to appear in commercials in the United States during her early career, Carey was not involved in brand marketing initiatives until 2006, when she participated in endorsements for Intel Centrino personal computers and launched a jewelry and accessories line for teenagers, Glamorized, in American Claire's and Icing stores. During this period, as part of a partnership with Pepsi and Motorola, Carey recorded and promoted a series of exclusive ringtones, including "Time of Your Life".

She signed a licensing deal with the cosmetics company Elizabeth Arden, and in 2007, she released her own fragrance, "M". The Elizabeth Arden deal has netted her $150 million. For the fragrance, Carey won a Basenotes Fragrance Award for Best Celebrity Women's Fragrance as well as being nominated in three other categories. She has released a series of fragrances with Elizabeth Arden, including Luscious Pink (2008) and Forever (2009). On November 29, 2010, she debuted a collection on HSN, which included jewelry, shoes and fragrances. In November 2011, Carey was announced as "brand ambassador" for Jenny Craig, Inc. which included "participation in a new company initiative... public service announcements and community and education programs." In 2018, Carey featured in an advertisement for Hostelworld with the tagline "Even Divas are Believers".

On August 25, 2019, Carey signed a $12 million contract with the Walkers crisps brand as part of their Christmas campaign and starred in a commercial for the company. In December 2020, she launched a partnership with Virtual Dining Concepts and restaurateur, Robert Earl, for a biscuit line titled Mariah's Cookies. In 2021, Carey announced the launch of a new line of alcohol called Black Irish, an homage to her Black, Venezuelan, and Irish heritage. That same year, she also partnered with McDonald's, promoting an entirely new limited time menu. In 2026, Carey starred in Gucci's holiday campaign.

=== Philanthropy and activism ===
Carey is a philanthropist who has been involved with several charitable organizations. She became associated with the Fresh Air Fund in the early 1990s, and co-founded a camp located in Fishkill, New York, that enables inner-city youth to embrace the arts and introduces them to career opportunities. The camp was called Camp Mariah "for her generous support and dedication to Fresh Air children," and she received a Congressional Horizon Award for her youth-related charity work. Carey has continued her direct involvement with Camp Mariah, and by 2019 the executive director of The Fresh Air Fund reported that "...the kids who have gone to Camp Mariah have higher graduation rates out of high school and college. In 1999, Carey was presented with a Congressional Award for contributing "to expanding opportunities for all Americans through their own personal contributions, and [setting] exceptional examples for young people through their own successes in life. In 2019, she was honored by Variety's Power of Women for her work with The Fresh Air Fund's Camp Mariah, and in 2026 she was named MusiCares Person of the Year for the same work as well as providing relief for communities impacted by Hurricane Katrina and the COVID-19 pandemic.

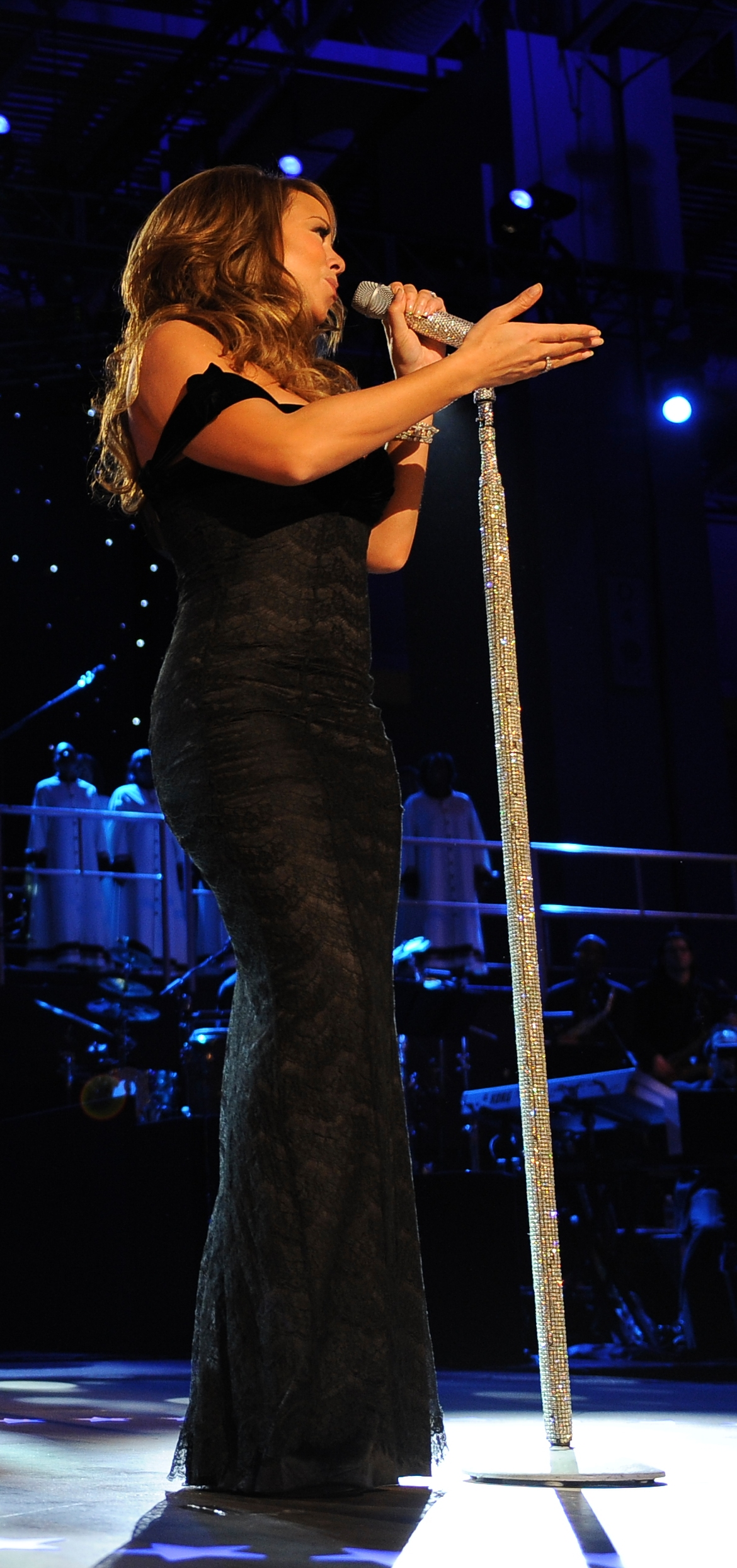
Carey performing "Hero" during the 2009 Neighborhood Inaugural Ball for Barack Obama

Carey donated royalties from her songs "Hero" and "One Sweet Day" to charities. She has worked with the Make-A-Wish Foundation, and in November 2006 she was awarded the Foundation's Wish Idol for her "extraordinary generosity and her many wish granting achievements." Carey has volunteered for the Police Athletic League of New York City and contributed to the obstetrics department of New York Presbyterian Hospital Cornell Medical Center. A percentage of the sales of MTV Unplugged was donated to various other charities.

In 2008, Carey was named Hunger Ambassador of the World Hunger Relief Movement. In February 2010, the song, "100%", which was originally written and recorded for the film, Precious, was used as one of the theme songs for the 2010 Winter Olympics, with all money proceeds going to Team USA. In 2017, Carey was awarded with PETA's Angel for Animals Award for promoting animal adoption through her animated movie All I Want for Christmas Is You.

One of Carey's most high-profile benefit concert appearances was on VH1's 1998 Divas Live special, during which she performed alongside other female singers in support of the Save the Music Foundation. The concert was a ratings success, and Carey participated in the Divas 2000 special and a 2016 holiday edition. She appeared at the America: A Tribute to Heroes nationally televised fundraiser in the aftermath of the September 11 attacks and performed before peacekeeping troops in Kosovo. Carey hosted the CBS television special At Home for the Holidays, which documented real-life stories of adopted children and foster families.

In 2005, Carey performed for Live 8 in London and at the Hurricane Katrina relief telethon "Shelter from the Storm". In August 2008, Carey and other singers recorded the charity single, "Just Stand Up!" produced by Babyface and L.A. Reid, to support Stand Up to Cancer. During the COVID-19 pandemic, Carey participated in the iHeart Living Room Concert for America and Rise Up New York! telethons to raise money for those affected by COVID-19. In 2025, a pink jacket worn by Carey during Brighton Pride earlier that year, with the slogan "Protect the Dolls" written on the back, has sold for $5,500 at auction, with the profits going to GLAAD's Transgender Media Program.

In 2008, Carey performed in a New Year's Eve concert for the family of Libyan dictator Muammar Gaddafi. She later said she felt "horrible and embarrassed" to have taken part in the concert. To make amends, in March 2011, Carey's representative Cindi Berger stated that royalties for the song "Save the Day", written for her fourteenth studio album, would be donated to charities that create awareness for human rights. Berger also said that Carey "has and continues to donate her time, money and countless hours of personal service to many organizations both here and abroad." "Save the Day" remained unreleased until 2020. In 2013, human rights activists criticized Carey for performing in a concert for Angola's "father–daughter kleptocracy" and accused her of accepting "dictator cash".

== Personal life ==
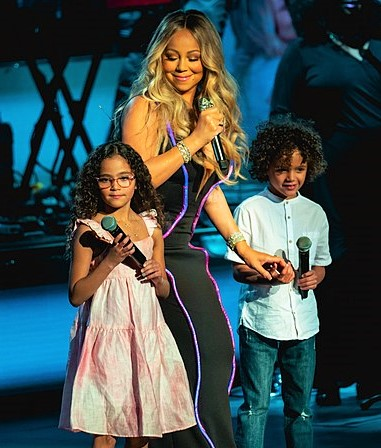
Carey with her twins in 2019

Carey stated in 2006: "I do believe that I have been born again in a lot of ways. I think what I've changed are my priorities and my relationships with God. I feel the difference when I don't have my private moments to pray... I'm a fighter, but I learned that I'm not in charge. Whatever God wants to happen is what's going to happen. I feel like I've had endless second, third, fourth, fifth and sixth chances. It's by the grace of God I'm still here."

Carey began dating Tommy Mottola while recording Mariah Carey, and they were married at the Episcopal Saint Thomas Church in New York City on June 5, 1993, in a half-million dollar ceremony. The newlyweds moved into a custom-built mansion, located on a 51-acre (21 ha) estate in Bedford, New York, referred to by Carey as "Sing Sing" (alluding to her feeling imprisoned there).

After the release of Daydream and the success that followed, Carey began focusing on her personal life, which was a constant struggle at the time. Their relationship began to deteriorate due to their growing creative differences in terms of her music, as well as Mottola's controlling nature. They separated in December 1996, and announced it publicly on May 30, 1997. The couple divorced on March 4, 1998. Shortly afterwards they sold their home to Nelson Peltz for $20.5 million; it burned down in 1999.

Carey was in a relationship with baseball player Derek Jeter from 1997 to 1998, and with singer Luis Miguel from 1998 to 2001. She began dating actor and comedian Nick Cannon while conceiving the music video for her song "Bye Bye", which they filmed together on an island off the coast of Antigua in April 2008. They were married on April 30, 2008, in the Bahamas. That same year, Carey suffered a miscarriage. At 35 weeks into her next pregnancy, she gave birth to their fraternal twins on April 30, 2011, via caesarean section. In August 2014, Cannon confirmed he and Carey had separated. He filed for divorce on December 12, 2014, which was finalized in 2016.

In 2015, Carey began dating Australian billionaire James Packer and, on January 21, 2016, she announced they were engaged. By October, however, they had called off the engagement. In October 2016, she began dating American choreographer Bryan Tanaka. On December 26, 2023, Tanaka confirmed that he and Carey had parted ways after seven years of dating. In April 2018, Carey opened up about taking therapy sessions and medication for her struggle with bipolar II disorder. She was diagnosed in 2001 and initially kept the diagnosis private.

== Discography ==
Studio albums

- Mariah Carey (1990)
- Emotions (1991)
- Music Box (1993)
- Merry Christmas (1994)
- Daydream (1995)
- Butterfly (1997)
- Rainbow (1999)
- Glitter (2001)
- Charmbracelet (2002)
- The Emancipation of Mimi (2005)
- E=MC² (2008)
- Memoirs of an Imperfect Angel (2009)
- Merry Christmas II You (2010)
- Me. I Am Mariah... The Elusive Chanteuse (2014)
- Caution (2018)
- Here for It All (2025)

== Filmography ==
- The Bachelor (1999)
- Glitter (2001)
- WiseGirls (2002)
- Death of a Dynasty (2003)
- State Property 2 (2005)
- Tennessee (2008)
- You Don't Mess with the Zohan (2008)
- Precious (2009)
- The Butler (2013)
- A Christmas Melody (2015)
- Popstar: Never Stop Never Stopping (2016)
- The Keys of Christmas (2016)
- The Lego Batman Movie (2017)
- Girls Trip (2017)
- The Star (2017)
- All I Want for Christmas Is You (2017)
- Mariah Carey's Magical Christmas Special (2020)
- Mariah's Christmas: The Magic Continues (2021)

== Tours and residencies ==
Headlining tours

- Music Box Tour (1993)
- Daydream World Tour (1996)
- Butterfly World Tour (1998)
- Rainbow World Tour (2000)
- Charmbracelet World Tour (2003–2004)
- The Adventures of Mimi (2006)
- Angels Advocate Tour (2009–2010)
- Australian Tour 2013 (2013)
- The Elusive Chanteuse Show (2014)
- The Sweet Sweet Fantasy Tour (2016)
- Mariah Carey: Live in Concert (2018)
- Caution World Tour (2019)
- Merry Christmas to All! Tour (2022)
- Merry Christmas One and All! (2023)
- Mariah Carey's Christmas Time (2024–present)
- Firefly Tour (2027)

Co-headlining tours

- All the Hits Tour (with Lionel Richie) (2017)

Residencies

- Live at the Pearl (2009)
- All I Want for Christmas Is You: A Night of Joy and Festivity (2014–2019)
- #1 to Infinity (2015–2017)
- The Butterfly Returns (2018–2020)
- The Celebration of Mimi (2024–2025)

== Written works ==
- All I Want for Christmas Is You. Random House Children's Books. November 10, 2015. ISBN 978-0-399-55139-0. Archived from the original on July 24, 2020.
- The Meaning of Mariah Carey. Henry Holt and Company. September 29, 2020. ISBN 978-1-250-16468-1. Archived from the original on July 24, 2020.
- The Christmas Princess (The Adventures of Little Mariah). Henry Holt Books for Young Readers. November 1, 2022. ISBN 978-1-250-83711-0. Archived from the original on May 14, 2022.

== Notes ==
Awards
First	Billboard Artist of the Decade; 1990s	Succeeded by Eminem
