= Firefly Tour =

Concert tour by American singer-songwriter Mariah Carey

- Tour by Mariah Carey
- Location: Europe
- Start date: June 24, 2027
- End date: July 20, 2027
- No. of shows: 9

Mariah Carey concert chronology
- The Celebration of Mimi (2025); Firefly Tour (2027)

The Firefly Tour is the sixteenth concert tour by American singer-songwriter Mariah Carey, consisting of multiple festival shows in Europe. It is due to begin on June 24, 2027 in Denmark, and conclude on July 20, 2027 in Switzerland. The series of concerts have been referred to as a "summer festivals tour", and will feature Eternal as a support act for the UK dates, with Sugababes supporting the Powderham show. On November 9, 2026, Live Nation UK announced that the pre-sale for the UK dates would begin on November 12, with general tickets on sale from the following day.

== Tour dates ==
List of concerts
Date (2027)	City	Country	Festival	Opening acts
June 24	Sønderborg	Denmark	Mølleparken	—N/a
June 27	Exeter	England	Live at Powderham	Eternal; Sugababes
June 29	Cardiff	Wales	Depot Live	Eternal
July 1	Woodstock (Note: Labeled as Oxfordshire in promotional material.)	England	Blenheim Palace Festival	Eternal
July 3	Scarborough	England	Scarborough Open Air Theatre	Eternal
July 8	Stuttgart	Germany	Jazz Open Stuttgart	—N/a
July 11	Lucca	Italy	Lucca Summer Festival	—N/a
July 14	Spa	Belgium	Francofolies de Spa Festival	—N/a
July 20	Locarno	Switzerland	Moon & Stars Festival	—N/a
