= The Meaning of Mariah Carey =

2020 memoir by Mariah Carey

- 2020 English hardcover edition
- Author: Mariah Carey; Michaela Angela Davis
- Audio read by: Mariah Carey
- Language: English
- Subject: Memoir
- Publisher: Andy Cohen Books (US); Macmillan (UK); Audible
- Publication date: September 29, 2020
- Media type: Print (hardcover, paperback); Digital; Audiobook
- Pages: 368 (hardcover); 352 (paperback)
- ISBN: 978-1-250-16468-1
- OCLC: 1157767321
- Dewey Decimal: 782.42164092
- LC Class: ML420.C2555 A3 2020

The Meaning of Mariah Carey is a memoir by American R&B singer Mariah Carey, released on September 29, 2020. It was written with Michaela Angela Davis, and was published by Andy Cohen Books, an imprint of Henry Holt, as well as in an audiobook format read by Carey herself on Audible. The book navigates the complex racial, social, cultural and familial tensions associated with Carey's upbringing as a biracial woman in Long Island, New York. This is framed alongside first-hand descriptions of the singer's personal and professional triumphs and struggles, and is interspersed with fragments of Carey's songwriting output.

The memoir was met with critical acclaim and commercial success, becoming a number-one New York Times Best Seller after its first week of release. To promote the memoir, Carey made a series of public appearances on a range of talk shows, including an interview with Oprah Winfrey on The Oprah Conversation.

== Background ==
Mariah Carey had considered writing a memoir since 2010 when she was pregnant with her twins Moroccan and Monroe. In the two years prior to The Meaning of Mariah Carey's release, she told stories to co-writer Michaela Angela Davis. The book was first rumored in April 2018, and Carey acknowledged she was working on it during promotional appearances for her fifteenth studio album Caution (2018). On July 9, 2020, she announced the memoir was complete, and subsequently released the book on September 29, 2020.

== Contents ==
The book includes a preface and epilogue and is divided into four parts: "Wayward Child", "Sing. Sing.", "All That Glitters", and "Emancipation". It focuses on Carey's childhood, career, and personal and professional relationships, with less of a focus on events after 2001. Alongside the plot, the inspirations and meanings of many of Carey's songs are explained and are often accompanied by excerpts from them. Chapters occasionally begin or end with lyrics from Carey's songs as epigraphs, and Bible verses are incorporated.

Media outlets noted that men associated with her such as Eminem and former fiancé James Packer are absent. Her role as a judge on American Idol and feud with Nicki Minaj is unrecognized. She explained: "If somebody or something didn't pertain to the actual meaning of Mariah Carey, as is the title, then they aren't in the book."

=== Summary ===
Carey witnessed violent fights between her older brother Morgan and parents Alfred and Patricia at a young age. She used music as an escape and sang herself lullabies. Patricia and a childhood friend recognized Carey's vocal talent; their validation was her raison d'être. The relationship deteriorated after Patricia warned Carey "you should only hope that one day you become half the singer I am". Carey was neglected and her safety was disregarded by Patricia. She felt inferior because of her unkempt matted hair and experiences with racism, including being called a nigger by a group of white girls. Her older sister Alison brought twelve-year-old Carey to a whorehouse and her pimp boyfriend kissed Carey at a drive-in theater. Alison drugged Carey and gave her third-degree burns.

After graduating from high school, Carey moved to New York City. She began working with other artists such as Brenda K. Starr, who introduced her to record executive Tommy Mottola. Carey signed with his label, Columbia, and they entered a working relationship. Mottola advanced romantic gestures, and she was attracted to him for the "sense of home" he provided. Mottola was determined to marry her, and Carey agreed in hoping he would loosen his grasp on her life. The marriage became strained as soon as their honeymoon. Mottola stifled Carey's voice, removed blackness from her music and appearance, and prevented her from realizing she was appreciated by others. As she was monitored with security cameras and an intercom system inside of the house and secretly followed by Mottola's security when leaving it, Carey likens herself to a captive in a prison. While Mottola "tried to destroy" her, she began a covert relationship with professional baseball player Derek Jeter, and their encounters deepened her music on Butterfly (1997). Coupled with Jeter, Carey separated from Mottola after he dragged a butter knife down her face. She divorced him and left Columbia for Virgin Records.

Carey's first album on her new label would be the soundtrack to the film Glitter (2001). Mottola continued to exert control over her career by interfering with both the film and album. To spite her after leaving him, the script became reductive and two of the soundtrack's songs were used to create similar-sounding ones for Jennifer Lopez. (Note: Glitter was released by Sony Pictures. As the CEO of Sony Music, Mottola had access to the production. He instructed Lopez's producers to recreate some of the soundtrack's songs for her, which were then released before Carey's. The original version of "Loverboy" is the basis for "I'm Real" (via its "Firecracker" sample) and "If We" is the model for its remix.) Combined with her demanding schedule, Mottola's meddling, and a tabloid frenzy over her appearance on MTV's Total Request Live, Carey was crippled with anxiety, fear, and exhaustion. Having almost no sleep in nearly a week, Morgan directed her to rest at their mother's house. Patricia woke Carey up and told her to go back to work. Carey verbally lashed out at Patricia, who called the police on her. Morgan convinced Carey to enter two facilities, both of which were unsuited to her needs. She was released from the second after the September 11 attacks and went on to promote Glitter. Carey entered therapy and was diagnosed with somatization. She was advised to no longer have contact with her siblings.

Carey departed Virgin for Island Records and recorded Charmbracelet (2002). She reconnected with God by being rebaptized and beginning a three-year study of the Bible. Carey appreciated the commercial success of The Emancipation of Mimi (2005) and the critical response to her role in Precious (2009) for their ability to make both the public and herself move on from Glitter. After starting a relationship with entertainer Nick Cannon, they quickly married to have children, though they would later divorce. Carey was delighted that "All I Want for Christmas Is You" reached number one on the US Billboard Hot 100 music chart for the first time in 2019 and expresses how fulfilled she now feels as a person.

== Style and genre ==
Book reviewers felt Carey's experiences in her youth do not reflect her persona as a diva. While not only about hardship, Victoria Segal of The Sunday Times considered it more serious than gossip-oriented celebrity memoirs. Writing for The Guardian, Alex Macpherson described the book as "not the glitzy, gossipy celebrity reminiscence some might expect, but instead a largely sombre dive into her past" due to the significant length about her traumatic childhood. Time's Cady Lang agreed, regarding the inclusion of Carey's relationship with Alison as "not a happy reminiscence on that time in her life, but instead a desire to heal from it". According to Véronique Hyland of Elle, "the reality of living with a flawed past and coping with the present" is the central theme. Noting its title is The Meaning of Mariah Carey—not The Making of Mariah Carey—Emily Lordi stated in The New Yorker that the book covers Carey's troubled youth more than her efforts to become successful. Rich Juzwiak concurred in the Los Angeles Times: "Much of the focus is not on what she has done but what was done to her."

Despite the book's subject matter, critics thought it purposely plays up her diva image and contains humor. Writing for the Irish Independent, Dónal Lynch said it "hams up Carey's reputation as the Marie Antoinette of pop". Aside from chapters before Carey's fame, Fiona Sturges of The Guardian thought it contains "a twinkling humour". Referring to the passage "I really don't want a lot for Christmas—particularly not the cops", Macpherson felt "Carey recounts many of the worst parts of her life with a deadpan, self-aware wit". The Financial Times' Ludovic Hunter-Tilney described the book as "laced with dry wit", and Segal thought "she cracks enough jokes to suggest she would be great fun over an unguarded bottle of wine". Hannah Reich of ABC News thought Carey's humor was pronounced in the audiobook version as it is aided by her speaking voice. According to Kirkus Reviews, the best parts of the memoir are those in which her personality is apparent. Variety wrote "you can ... hear every sentence perfectly in [Carey's] voice". Citing comments about getting her hair done after the September 11 attacks and referring to Jennifer Lopez as "another female entertainer ... (whom I don't know)", Rob Sheffield of Rolling Stone felt "every page is packed with her over-the-top personality". Readers are often addressed as "dahlings".

== Publication and promotion ==
Andy Cohen Books, an imprint of Henry Holt and Company, published The Meaning of Mariah Carey on September 29, 2020. It was one of the division's first releases. The book was initially issued in English hardcover, paperback, ebook, and audiobook editions. It was later translated into several languages, including Bulgarian, Dutch, French, German, Spanish, Swedish, and Traditional Chinese. In December 2020, Carey said she was exploring how to adapt the memoir into a limited series or film. The Guardian reported in February 2021 that Lee Daniels is working on a miniseries based on the book.

To promote the memoir, Carey discussed the book in several televised interviews on American morning and late-night talk shows. With Jane Pauley on CBS News Sunday Morning, she talked about her troubled childhood, marriage to Mottola, and the events of Glitter. On CBS This Morning with Gayle King, she focused on the strained relationship with her mother. Carey explained the purpose of writing the memoir and the process of recording the alternative rock album Someone's Ugly Daughter during an interview with Stephen Colbert on The Late Show. On Watch What Happens Live with Andy Cohen and The Daily Show with Trevor Noah, she described early experiences with racism. During an episode of her Apple TV+ show The Oprah Conversation, Carey spoke with Oprah Winfrey about the impact that her unique hair had as a young girl and her relationship with Derek Jeter. In an interview with Trevor Nelson on BBC Radio 2 in the United Kingdom, Carey detailed relationships with her children and fans and addressed the pervasiveness of sexism in the music industry. She also participated in a conversation with Misty Copeland for Amazon Live. Carey felt the publisher gave the book limited promotion due to expenses associated with styling her.

The Meaning of Mariah Carey appeared on weekly book sales charts in multiple countries. In the United States, it debuted at number one on The New York Times Best Seller list in both the Hardcover Nonfiction and Combined Print & E-book Nonfiction categories. Entering at number three on Hardcover Frontlist Nonfiction and number six overall on Publishers Weekly charts based on NPD BookScan figures, the book sold 62,557 units in its first three weeks of release in the United States according to the company. In Canada, it debuted at number three on both The Globe and Mail's Hardcover Non Fiction and the Toronto Star's Original Non-Fiction bestseller lists, which are based on data from BookNet Canada. It entered at number seven on The Sunday Times' General Hardbacks chart, selling about 6,940 copies in the United Kingdom according to Nielsen BookScan.

== Critical response ==
The book received widespread acclaim from critics, general audiences, and Carey's fans alike. Numerous publications listed The Meaning of Mariah Carey in their rankings of the best music books or celebrity memoirs of 2020, including The Atlantic, the Financial Times, The Globe and Mail, The Guardian, the Irish Independent, NME, Pitchfork, Rolling Stone/Kirkus Reviews, The San Diego Union-Tribune, The Times, and Variety.

Critics reviewed the book's prose and structure. Writing for The New Yorker, Emily Lordi described it as "impressively well-written". The Atlantic's Spencer Kornhaber cited Carey's childhood memory about Ritz crackers as one of several brief reminiscences that "elevate The Meaning of Mariah Carey from celebrity propaganda into impressive storytelling". In the Los Angeles Times, Rich Juzwiak said short stories such as Carey's relationship with Jeter incorporate "tension and poignancy not typically seen in celebrity writing". According to Entertainment Weekly's Mary Sollosi, the non-sequential chapters make the storytelling more powerful than if they were all in chronological order. In contrast, The New Republic's Jo Livingstone thought the writing style makes the book feel "pieced together from interviews". Aisha Harris of NPR complimented the narrative structure but felt details about the success of Carey's projects are excessive. Alex Macpherson concurred in The Guardian, while Kirkus Reviews thought it contains no filler. Critics considered a paragraph that appears twice in different chapters as an editing error.

Representations of Carey's artistry were highlighted in reviews. As the book explains her creative methods, Adriana Ramirez wrote in the Pittsburgh Post-Gazette that it stands out from a typical memoir. Macpherson considered songs' inspirations and Carey's experiences collaborating with others some of the "most rewarding sections"; Lordi deemed passages describing her musical inspirations and writing style the "greatest revelations". According to Juzwiak, Carey's songwriting process from experiences to music unfolds poetically. Lisa Henry predicted in the Library Journal "the stories behind her lyrics will undoubtedly create a new appreciation for her work". The memoir's depiction of race was also noted. Regarding the subject, Macpherson thought it was "particularly acute", and Kornhaber felt it included "sharp analysis". Hannah Reich of ABC News described Carey's experiences with racism both as a child and in the music industry "deftly and powerfully rendered".

Some reviewers thought omissions of Carey's experiences with other people detracted from the memoir. Writing for the i, John Aizlewood criticized it for "concentrat[ing] on how unspeakably awful [Carey's] life was" with Mottola instead of mentioning more positive aspects of the relationship which he felt led to their marriage. As she and Eminem "volleyed diss tracks for years", Juzwiak thought the memoir does a disservice to readers by not acknowledging him, and Variety's Danielle Turchiano considered the choice odd because "there is still enough interest ... to warrant a chapter". Conversely, Cady Lang of Time and Michael Blackmon of BuzzFeed News viewed the exclusion as an effort to wrest control of her narrative. Given the absence of references to Packer, Andrew Hornery of The Sydney Morning Herald said Carey "committed the worst crime of a celebrity autobiography: skipped over and outright ignored some of the juiciest chapters of her life." Rolling Stone's Rob Sheffield was surprised Whitney Houston is first recognized in 1998 despite being perceived as her rival since 1990, and Lordi remarked there is "no hint of competition" with other musicians.

== Lawsuits ==
Mariah's sister Alison filed a lawsuit against Carey with the New York Supreme Court in February 2021 seeking $1.25 million for emotional distress caused by the memoir. She disputes her depiction and says it was used to generate book sales. In the same court the following month, Mariah's brother, Morgan filed a lawsuit against Carey, Davis, and the publishers for emotional distress and defamation for his portrayal. A judge dismissed most of his claims in February 2022 except for two regarding drug-dealing and imprisonment which could potentially be defamatory. The lawsuit was not resolved before Alison's death in 2024.

In September 2024, a New York judge ordered Mariah and her brother Morgan, who also filed for a lawsuit in 2021 for "defamation and the intentional infliction of emotional distress", to sit for depositions before January 31, 2025. Later that year, it was announced Mariah Carey would be questioned under oath over her brother's claims she lied about him in her book. She was to be deposed on January 17, 2025 by her brother's lawyers and was required to appear in person for the filmed interview.

== See also ==
- The New York Times Non-Fiction Best Sellers of 2020
