= I don't know her =

Phrase and meme

Mariah Carey saying "I don't know her" in response to a question about Jennifer Lopez became a popular Internet meme

"I don't know her" is a phrase coined by American singer Mariah Carey in response to a circa 2003 question about her thoughts on American performer Jennifer Lopez, whom media outlets perceived as her rival at the time. Carey's reaction, in which she shakes her head and smiles while stating "I don't know her", became a popular Internet meme and GIF. Due to its subsequent use by other celebrities, Vanity Fair deemed mid-2016 "The Summer of Not Knowing".

When asked about Lopez, Carey identified herself as a singer and denied an ongoing feud. After stating "I don't know her", she employed the expression over the next two decades. Carey contends it is not an affront to Lopez because she does not know her personally; Lopez herself says they do not know each other.

== Background and description ==
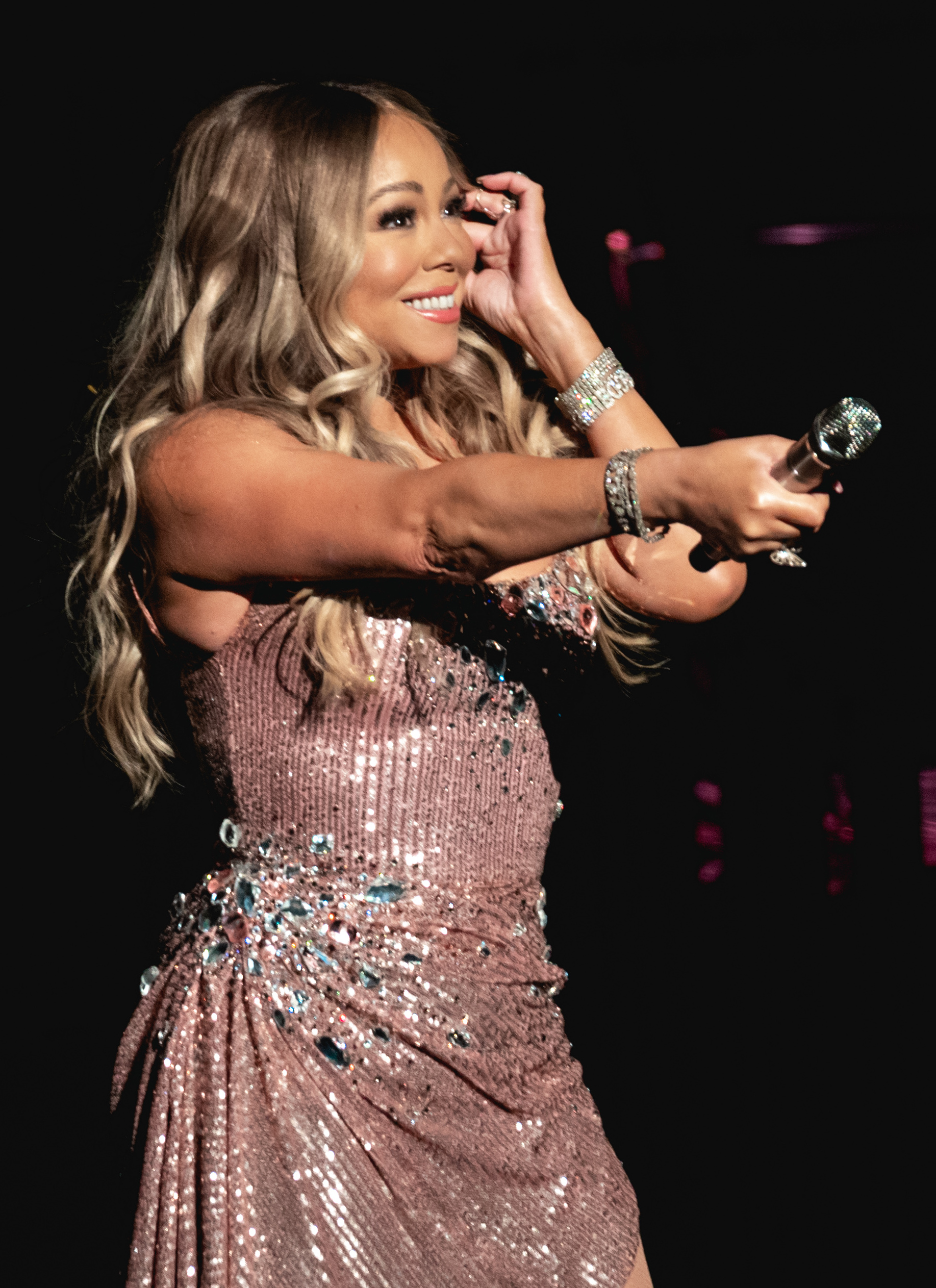
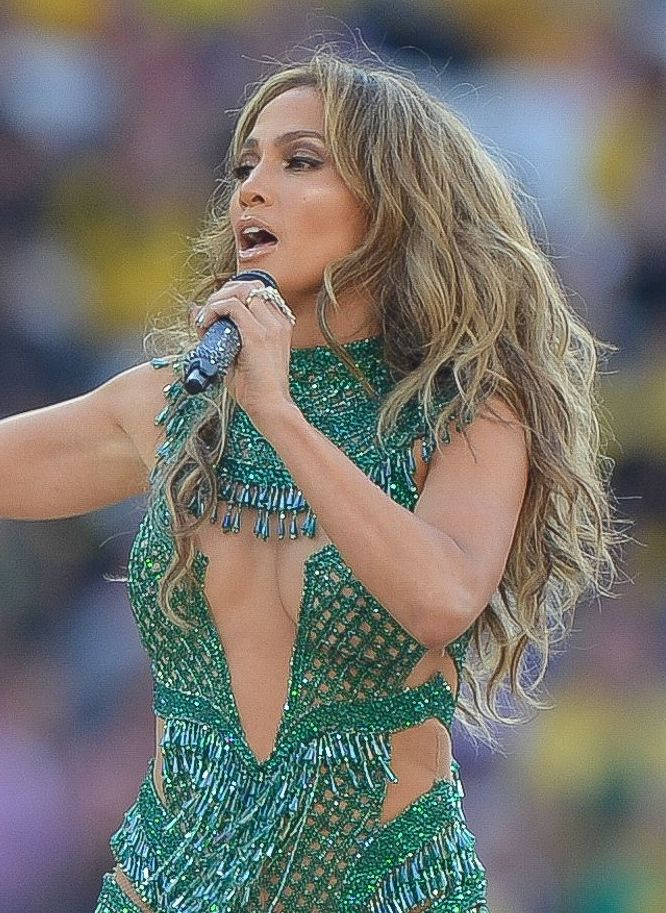
In the late 1990s and early 2000s, media outlets considered Mariah Carey (left) and Jennifer Lopez (right) to be in a feud.

Similar to the conflict instigated by the media regarding her relationship with Whitney Houston, American singer Mariah Carey's feelings toward Jennifer Lopez became a subject of gossip in the late 1990s and early 2000s. Lopez began a working relationship with Carey's former husband, Tommy Mottola, in 1998. The apparent feud escalated in 2001 after a sampling controversy involving Carey's song "Loverboy" (2001) and Lopez's "I'm Real" (2001). (Note: Carey alleged that during the recording process for Glitter (2001), Sony Music officials heard a sample from the 1978 Yellow Magic Orchestra song "Firecracker" that she used in the track "Loverboy" and incorporated it in Lopez's "I'm Real". As the latter was released before Glitter, Carey re-recorded "Loverboy" to sound distinct from "I'm Real". Sony denied that "I'm Real" used a stolen sample from "Loverboy".) Following these events, Carey responded to Lopez's comments about sleeping eight hours per night in a 2001 interview with journalist Vanessa Grigoriadis: "If I had the luxury of not actually having to sing my own songs I'd do that too." During an appearance on Larry King Live in 2002, Carey remarked: "There are rivalries, but I don't think she has anything to do with me. I mean, my whole thing is singing, writing songs ... It's a God-given talent I'm grateful for, her thing is something different".

Around 2003, Carey was interviewed by the German television program taff. Upon being asked about Beyoncé, Carey remarked that she loved her as an artist. After she was questioned about Lopez, Carey stated, "I don't know her," while smiling and shaking her head. The interview was uploaded on YouTube in 2008 and her "I don't know her" comment began circulating as a GIF on Internet forums. It became prevalent on Twitter and Tumblr in the 2010s. By 2014, the "I don't know her" GIF was often used as a reaction on the internet. It became one of the most popular Internet memes in history by 2018.

Carey used the phrase to address Lopez throughout its rise in popularity as she was questioned about the subject during interviews. She reprised it with MTV in 2005 ("I don't even know her. We kind of just said hello once or twice"), during a 2009 radio discussion ("I don't know the woman"), a 2016 TMZ exchange ("I still don't know her"), and a 2016 Watch What Happens Live appearance ("I don't know her. What am I supposed to say?"). While discussing the sampling controversy in her 2020 memoir The Meaning of Mariah Carey, she described Lopez as a "female entertainer on [Sony] (whom I don't know)". Carey has used the phrase toward other singers such as Demi Lovato. After the latter said she was rude to Lopez, Carey responded, "I don't know her either."

Carey contends that the phrase is not an insult but rather an honest response because she does not know Lopez personally. In 2014, Lopez said, "I don't have a feud against [Carey] at all. I know from back in the day, I’ve read things that she's said about me that were not the greatest, but we have never met. Like, we don't know each other." During a 2016 interview, Lopez said Carey had forgotten that they have met on many occasions.

== Analysis ==
Many writers considered Carey's use of the phrase an insult. Shinan Govani said it was "succinctly withering, if not true" in the Toronto Star. Who? Weekly podcasters Lindsey Weber and Bobby Finger described it as an example of shade, Vogue's Alex Kessler said it was a snub, and CNN's Chloe Melas called it a diss. Kristin Iversen thought it was an example of passive-aggressive behavior in Nylon. Based on the subsequent comments from Carey and Lopez, Stephanie Marcus of HuffPost said it "could have been less of a diss than we all assumed".

The phrase's purpose in other contexts received analysis. According to scholars Mireille Lalancette and Tamara A. Small, it "is used when another person is so irrelevant you pretend to not know them when you clearly do". The Guardian's Issy Sampson and African American studies professor Alexander G. Weheliye considered "I don't know her" a means of insulting someone implicitly. Michelle Ruiz wrote in Vogue: "Now there is no more savage burn in Hollywood, no sharper way to declare yourself so utterly above it all, than to publicly pretend you exist in a world where your very famous counterpart does not." Kenzie Bryant of Vanity Fair thought it can be misinterpreted when used as a neutral no comment response.

The phrase has received comparisons to subsequent remarks by other public figures: "Great gowns. Beautiful gowns" (Aretha Franklin on Taylor Swift), "I don't know her" (Andy Cohen on Kathy Griffin), "I don't know the other one, but Cardi is my girl" (Lil' Kim on Nicki Minaj), "Sorry to this man" (Keke Palmer on Dick Cheney), "Ah, what's, sorry, what's your name?" (Lidia Thorpe on Pauline Hanson), "I actually don't know what Free Guy is" (Gerard Butler on Ryan Reynolds), "We don't know each other" (Kelly Clarkson on Carrie Underwood), and LeBron James being unable to name the Vegas Golden Knights. Due to the number of celebrities repeating variations at the time, Vanity Fair labeled mid-2016 "The Summer of Not Knowing".

"I don't know her" been cited in political commentary about US president Donald Trump. HuffPost's Marina Fang likened Trump's comments about his relationships with lawyers Michael Cohen and Paul Manafort to the phrase. Matt Moen of Paper thought Trump saying "I don't know her" regarding conservative pundit Ann Coulter was also derivative. Referring to his denial of knowing mobster Felix Sater, commentator Symone Sanders deemed Trump "the Mariah Carey of politics ... He is very good at pretending he doesn't know someone when it suits him". After Trump said he never spoke with US ambassador Gordon Sondland, MSNBC host Ari Melber described him as employing the "Mariah Carey defense".

== Impact ==
"I don't know her" has been viewed as contributing to Carey's public image. Writers for Billboard and Elle ranked it as one of the most iconic moments of her career. Journalist Marina Hyde called it Carey's most famous quote, Paper's Katherine Gillespie considered it her catchphrase, and HuffPost's Cody Delbyck deemed it her doctrine. In The Guardian, Alim Kheraj said the remark "has now become something she leans into with camp abandon". Sandra Miller of The A.V. Club and Niela Orr of The Baffler suggested it represents a shift in Carey's persona to one that embraced social media. The Independent writer Louis Staples said "Carey's GIF-friendly moments have helped her make the transition from the era of CDs to the online landscape".

Writers thought the phrase contributed to an image of Carey as a diva. Los Angeles Times contributor Rich Juzwiak judged it as "the definitive meme of diva shade". Musicologist Lily E. Hirsch argued that the popular reaction to "I don't know her" made this diva image imbued with sexism and racism. Writing in The Wall Street Journal, Emily Lordi said Carey's use of the phrase shows how the diva is not necessarily a pro-feminist figure. Natalie Reilly of The Sydney Morning Herald said "such shade is all part of the Mariah Carey mystique." Ben Kaye of Consequence and Daniel Welsh of HuffPost UK said "I don't know her" contributed to Carey owning the title "Queen of Shade".

"I don't know her" has been considered an influence on pop culture. Abby Ohlheiser ranked the meme at number two on The Washington Post's list of the most important viral reactions on the Internet since 2000. Writers at The A.V. Club grouped it among the 100 most memorable parts of internet culture in the 2010s. "No other response has infiltrated the pop culture lexicon deeper" according to Ernest Macias of Entertainment Weekly. Staff writers for Billboard listed the phrase as the most iconic of 100 pop star memes, describing it as "a crucial element of Carey's cultural brand". The phrase is used within the queer community and inspired "I don't know her"-themed club nights, clothing, and artwork.

In 2025, Carey referenced the phrase in the music video for her song "Type Dangerous". The singer dismisses MrBeast, who makes a cameo in the video, by stating "I don't know him" and turning him into banknotes.
