= Public image of Mariah Carey =

Public perceptions of American singer-songwriter

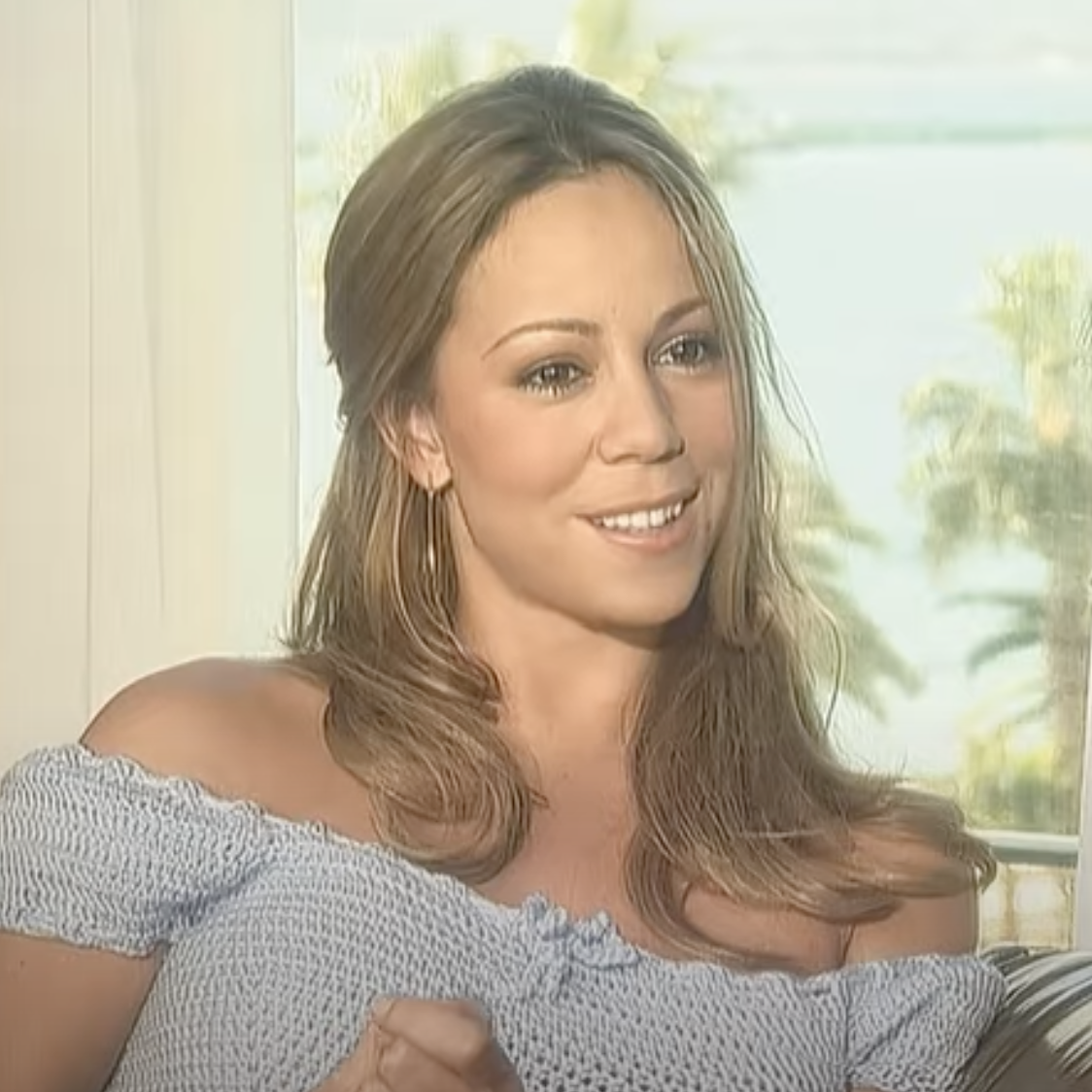
Carey being interviewed for her album Rainbow in Cannes, 2000

Throughout her career, American singer Mariah Carey has received recognition as a cultural and public figure. Her public image has undergone transformations, subsequently receiving press coverage.

Initially emerging in the early 1990s with a polished and controlled image under the influence of her then-husband Tommy Mottola, Carey later embraced a more liberated persona following their separation and the release of Butterfly (1997). Throughout the early 2000s, Carey's image was faced with media scrutiny after her much-publicized breakdown during the promotion of her 2001 film Glitter. She made a musical comeback with The Emancipation of Mimi (2005). During the 2010s, Carey faced heavy media attention for her celebrity life before making another smaller musical comeback with Caution (2018). Her music has also inspired several viral challenges on TikTok.

Throughout her career, Carey has maintained having and embracing a signature diva persona, and has also been called a pop icon, gay icon and a fashion icon. She been praised for her ability to throw shade and has had publicised feuds with Eminem and Jennifer Lopez. She has been credited for starting the trend of wearing low-rise jeans in the early 2000s and her outfits have been the subject of polarizing reviews and reactions. Carey has also contributed heavily to several social media memes, being the (often unintentional) originator and inspiration for various memes including "I don't know her" and "skinny legend".

Carey has also been dubbed the "Queen of Christmas" for her impact as a holiday icon and her popular Christmas music, and has since become synonymous with the Christmas season. Her 1994 song "All I Want for Christmas Is You" is a Christmas standard and has won Carey several awards and honors. Since 2014, she has toured every holiday season, earning various achievements over the years. She has also hosted Christmas specials (television and film). Every year since 2019, Carey has posted a video on social media on November 1 to ring in the Christmas season, coining the popular Christmas phrase "It's Time".

== Mainstream perceptions ==
=== In the media ===
==== 1990s ====
After her debut in 1990, Carey was featured in the media, with Medium writer Lucas Cava noting that her debut single, "Vision of Love" signalled the emergence of a "supremely talented writer and performer". Carey's debut was described by Stephen Holden, writer for The New York Times as a win for Columbia Records, noting that it "came with more fanfare and promotional hoopla than [they] had bestowed on a new young talent in years". The story of Tommy Mottola, the Chairman and CEO of Sony Music Entertainment, spending two weeks using his contacts in the music industry to find Carey after she handed him her demo tape at a CBS music executives' gala, has often been described as Carey's "Cinderella story". Holden was the first journalist to note comparisons of Carey's voice to American singer Whitney Houston's who had made her debut five years earlier in 1985. Early in her career, she faced criticism from journalists (Note: Writing for The Globe and Mail and Rolling Stone among others.) that she was a "Whitney Houston knock-off". Despite this, Dennis Hunt, writing for the Los Angeles Times noted that "Carey is undeniably, unstoppably popular" calling the situation ironic as Carey's debut album sold more than Houston's in its sixth week. Rumors of a rivalry between the two artists began to spread, with both Carey and Houston being asked about each other during interviews. Carey noted "that since people weren't familiar with her, they needed to compare her to someone they already knew", hoping that people would see their musical differences. The two later performed the duet "When You Believe" from the animated feature film The Prince of Egypt (1998), dispelling any feud. The duo performed the song live on The Oprah Winfrey Show, and at the 71st Academy Awards.

After the release of Carey's second studio album, Emotions (1991), critics began to doubt Carey's vocals and "questioned her ability to replicate it in the live setting". Several critics accused Carey of being a studio artist and not being capable of delivering or replicating the same quality vocals live, particularly that of her whistle register. In response, Carey performed a special concert on MTV Unplugged, a show aired by MTV to present artists in an "unplugged" or stripped environment. Carey's performance received critical acclaim, with BET writer Paul Meara noting that Carey not only "silenced her critics with the performance", but also "had the last laugh" according to Billboard writer Starr Bowenbank, with the live version of the performance released as an EP and selling over 2.7 million copies. The EP peaked at number three on the US Billboard 200 and garnered the number-one single "I'll Be There".

At the beginning of her career, Carey adopted a polished image due to the influence her then-husband, Tommy Mottola (Note: Mottola was the Chairman and CEO of Sony Music Entertainment, in which Carey's label (Columbia Records) was a subsidiary of.) had over her career. Carey's marriage and later divorce to Mottola received media attention. The two married in 1993, with the wedding said to have cost over $500,000. In a 2019 interview with Cosmopolitan, Carey noted that during her marriage to Mottola, "there was no freedom for [her] as a human being", feeling like a "prisoner". Mottola later called the relationship "wrong and inappropriate". Carey and Mottola separated in 1997 and divorced in 1998. Carey's subsequent relationship with American baseball player Derek Jeter received media attention, with Carey retrospectively calling him a "catalyst" for her divorce to Mottola.

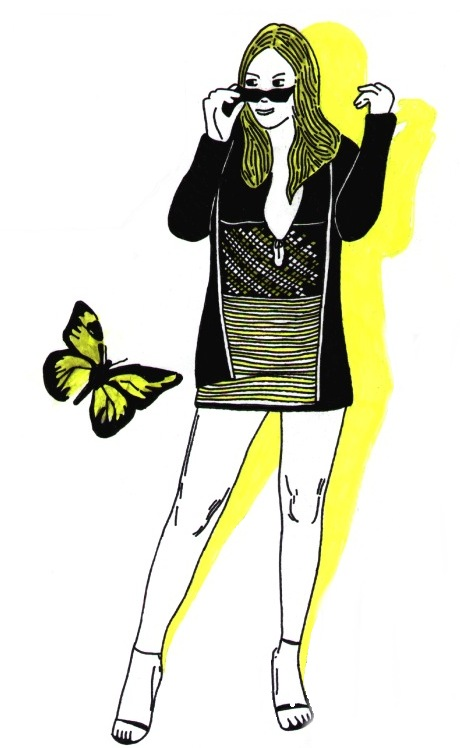
An artwork of Carey with a butterfly, which became her signature following the release of the 1997 album Butterfly.

After her separation with Mottola, Carey began to be depicted more sexually in her music videos and her red carpet looks were more provocative. The music video for "Honey" received media attention for showing a more sexual side to Carey, portraying her half-naked, jumping off a balcony into a pool. Carey and Mottola were in the process of their divorce, which "caused fans to speculate the messages displayed within the video". The song was featured on Carey's 1997 album, Butterfly, which was later credited for revamping Carey's image in the public as a pop star who embraced hip-hop and R&B themes. This resulted in butterflies becoming a metaphorical symbol of her impact and legacy upon pop and R&B music. Carey noted in her 2020 memoir The Meaning of Mariah Carey that Butterfly was "a turning point in her songwriting career, where bits of her personal life began to inform her craft more explicitly". The Washington Post writer Bethonie Butler called Butterfly "symbolic" adding that during the rollout of the album, Carey's "clothing style grew noticeably sexier" and in turn that made her "more playful with her fans, more frank in interviews".

During the late 1990s, Carey was involved in a publicised dispute between herself and her label. After the release of Butterfly and Carey's divorce with Mottola, her working relationship with the label deteriorated. Due to this, Carey negotiated her exit from the label with Norio Ohga, the president and chairman of Sony Corporation. She achieved this, but not before reaching an agreement on two greatest hits albums (#1's and Greatest Hits – later released in 1998 and 2001 respectively), a remix album (The Remixes – later released in 2003) and a last album under the label, her seventh studio album, Rainbow (1999). During the rollout of Rainbow, Carey originally intended for her ballad "Can't Take That Away (Mariah's Theme)" to be the third single from the album (following the number-one singles "Heartbreaker" and "Thank God I Found You"); however, Sony made it clear that they wanted the single to be a more upbeat track like "Crybaby". In response, Carey began posting messages on her website, informing fans about the dispute and instructing them to request "Can't Take That Away (Mariah's Theme)" on radio stations. Fearing to lose Carey's commitment to the label, Sony released "Can't Take That Away (Mariah's Theme)" and "Crybaby" as a simultaneously double A-side single, with limited promotion.

==== 2000s ====
In the early 2000s, after her departure from Columbia, Carey signed a four-album contract with Virgin Records worth an estimated $80–$100 million, which in turn received publicity for being the largest contract in music at that point in time. The first album to be released under Carey's contract would be the soundtrack to her 2001 film, Glitter. During this time, Carey became a "tabloid fixture", particularly for her public breakdown during the promotion of Glitter which became the "stuff of tabloid legend" (Note: According to Justin Curto, writer for Vulture.)

The soundtrack to Glitter received several setbacks, including the original sample for its lead single, "Loverboy", being used in Jennifer Lopez's song "I'm Real", causing Carey to rush to find a new sample. Vulture writer Matthew Jacobs noted that "assumptions about Carey's erraticism" began to spread in the media after her "quasi-scandalous" appearance on Total Request Live (TRL). Carey's appearance on TRL garnered strong media attention, with many critics and newspapers citing her behavior as "troubled" and "erratic". Carey was later hospitalized and Glitter faced several additional setbacks. The soundtrack was eventually released on September 11, 2001, with Carey retrospectively blaming the September 11 attacks for the project's weak commercial reaction.

The film itself was received to mostly negative reviews, with many media outlets calling it a "critical and commercial" failure. Initially, Carey insisted that the film was not autobiographical, although it was noted that the film often "mirrored details from her life". Carey's acting was also panned by critics and she won the Golden Raspberry Award for Worst Actress. Several actors and actresses from Glitter have openly dismissed and criticised the film including Max Beesley, Da Brat, and Terrence Howard. Glitter has also been called one of the worst films ever made. In response to the failure of Glitter, Carey was bought out of her contract with Virgin Records for $28 million with The New York Times reporting that it marked "the first time that a major music corporation decided to cut its losses on a superstar agreement".

During this time, Carey faced media attention for other personal setbacks including her relationship with Latin singer Luis Miguel. Carey and Miguel were in a relationship from 1998 to 2001, with Carey stating in 2000 that the two were happy despite the media always attacking their relationship. Carey later explained in her memoir that there were "cultural gaps" between Miguel and herself. Their relationship was later dramatised in Miguel's autobiographical television series, Luis Miguel: The Series (2021), where Carey was portrayed by British singer and actress Jade Ewen. In 2002, Carey starred in WiseGirls alongside Mira Sorvino and Melora Walters which received generally mixed reviews, although praise was given to Carey's role. Various journalists called it a small comeback for Carey as an actress after Glitter. (Note: Including Variety, Fox News, The Hollywood Reporter, and USA Today.) That same year, Carey signed a record deal with Island Def Jam valued at more than $24 million, after The New York Times reported that there was a bidding war. Carey had a mildly unsuccessful period in music following Glitter with her follow-up album Charmbracelet (2002).

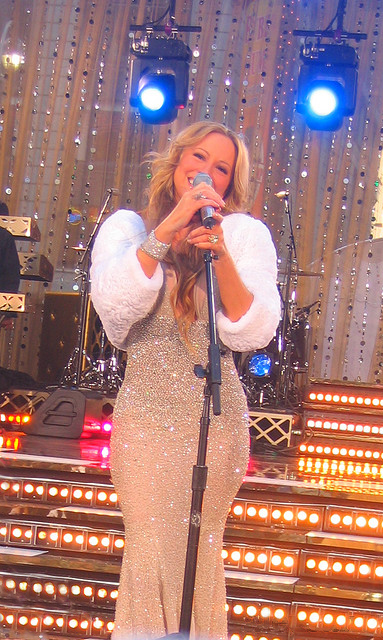
Carey performing her comeback single, "We Belong Together", on Good Morning America in 2005

Carey returned to mainstream media prominence with the album, The Emancipation of Mimi (2005). Vulture called the album an "all-time-great pop renaissance". Carey released the album's lead single, "It's Like That", to positive reviews with Billboard calling it a return for Carey. The album's second single, "We Belong Together" received critical acclaim, and was deemed Carey's "comeback" song after Glitter and Charmbracelet. The song peaked at number-one on the Billboard Hot 100 and went on to be one of Carey's most successful songs. The album also debuted atop the Billboard 200 and is one of the best-selling albums of the 21st century. The album's third single, "Shake It Off" peaked at number two on the Hot 100 behind "We Belong Together", marking the first time a female artist occupied the top two positions of the Hot 100. In 2008, Carey was named one of Time's 100 most influential artists and entertainers in the world. That same year, Carey married American comedian Nick Cannon. She gave birth to their twins in 2011.

Carey starred in the film Precious (2009) as a social worker named Ms. Weiss. Carey's role in the film received critical acclaim, while the film itself was also received well and went on to receive six nominations at the 82nd Academy Awards. Los Angeles Times writer Chris Lee noted that the "high-maintenance pop diva underwent a soup-to-nuts physical transformation". Lee added that the role was "far from the image Carey has cultivated for years", and described the character "drab but deeply empathetic soul". The film is considered Carey's acting comeback after Glitter, (Note: As cited by The Sydney Morning Herald, The New York Times, and Bustle.) and TheThings writer Rocco Papa opined that Carey received acclaim for her "unrecognizable appearance". The director of the film, Lee Daniels, noted that he broke several "Mariah rules" when filming her, including "the use of fluorescent lighting to her being filmed from the worst angles". Carey went on to win the Breakthrough Performance Award at the Palm Springs International Film Festival. Her speech went viral on social media after some noted that she sounded drunk.

==== 2010s ====
In the 2010s, Now writer Kevin Hegge stated that the media and general public began to dwell on Carey's "celebrity drama". In 2013, after joining American Idol as a judge for the twelfth season, Carey became one of the highest paid American television stars with a $18 million paycheck. During the show, there were onset disagreements between herself and fellow judge Nicki Minaj, with a video leaked by TMZ showing the two arguing. In 2014, Carey's separation and later divorce from Cannon received media attention after the two were spotted without their wedding rings. In December of that year, Carey's performance of her song "All I Want for Christmas Is You" at the NBC Rockefeller Center Christmas Tree Lighting special received negative media attention (Note: Reported by various journalists writing for USA Today, Forbes, and CNN.) with TheWrap reporting that Carey sounded like she was "losing even more of her voice, as well as her breath". CNN also reported that Carey was three hours late, reportedly due to a meeting with her lawyer about her divorce settlement with Cannon. Carey later apologized on Twitter.

From 2015 to 2016, Carey's relationship, engagement and breakup to Australian billionaire James Packer received publicity. Packer proposed to Carey with a 35-carat diamond ring, estimated to be worth around $5–10 million. The ring became one of the most expensive celebrity engagement rings of all time. Carey later sold the ring and cited mental health reasons for their separation. Carey reportedly sought a $50 million "inconvenience fee" from Packer and received a multimillion-dollar settlement, and she burnt her custom $250,000 wedding dress in the music video for her 2017 single "I Don't".

In 2017, Carey's Dick Clark's New Year's Rockin' Eve performance received media attention after it was marred by technical issues. Various publications called the performance a disaster, with Carey later tweeting, "Here's to making more headlines in 2017". A month later, Carey stated in an interview with Rolling Stone that it was a "chaotic mess", feeling that Dick Clark Productions had "set her up to fail". The production company denied all accusations. Vanity Fair writer Kenzie Bryant opined that "the malfunctions, mixed with Carey's extra diva humor, made for great television". Carey returned to the same stage a year later with publications calling it redemption. Carey's fifteenth studio album, Caution (2018) received widespread critical acclaim, with Hegge describing it as a musical comeback for Carey who had not received so much media attention for her music.

==== 2020s ====
In the early 2020s, Carey and her songs have gone viral on TikTok. In 2019, her song "Obsessed" became a viral TikTok challenge where thousands of users recreated a clip of a user sobbing and dancing to the song. "Always Be My Baby" also went viral on the app, causing the song to chart on various charts including the TikTok Billboard Top 50 chart. Other songs which prompted viral challenges include "Fantasy", "It's a Wrap", and "Touch My Body".

Carey's personal life continued to receive media coverage throughout the decade, including her break up after seven years together with Bryan Tanaka, who announced it through a statement on Instagram on Boxing Day in 2023, as well as the deaths of her mother and sister, who both died on the same day in August 2024. In December 2024, several media outlets began speculating about Carey's rumoured relationship with fellow American singer Anderson .Paak, who worked with Carey on her then-upcoming sixteenth studio album, Here for It All (2025), and featured on the album's third single, "Play This Song".

In February 2026, Carey's performance of Domenico Modugno's "Nel blu, dipinto di blu" and "Nothing Is Impossible" at the opening ceremony of the 2026 Winter Olympics caused controversy on social media, due to Carey not having Italian heritage, and accusations of lip syncing. In response, the director of the opening ceremony, Maria Laura Iascone, stated: "During all the ceremonies, in order to be on the safe side, we always record". Iascone praised Carey's performance, stating: "We were extremely happy and satisfied with her performance" where Carey "sang an Italian song, which people in the stadium felt deeply about".

=== Fandom ===
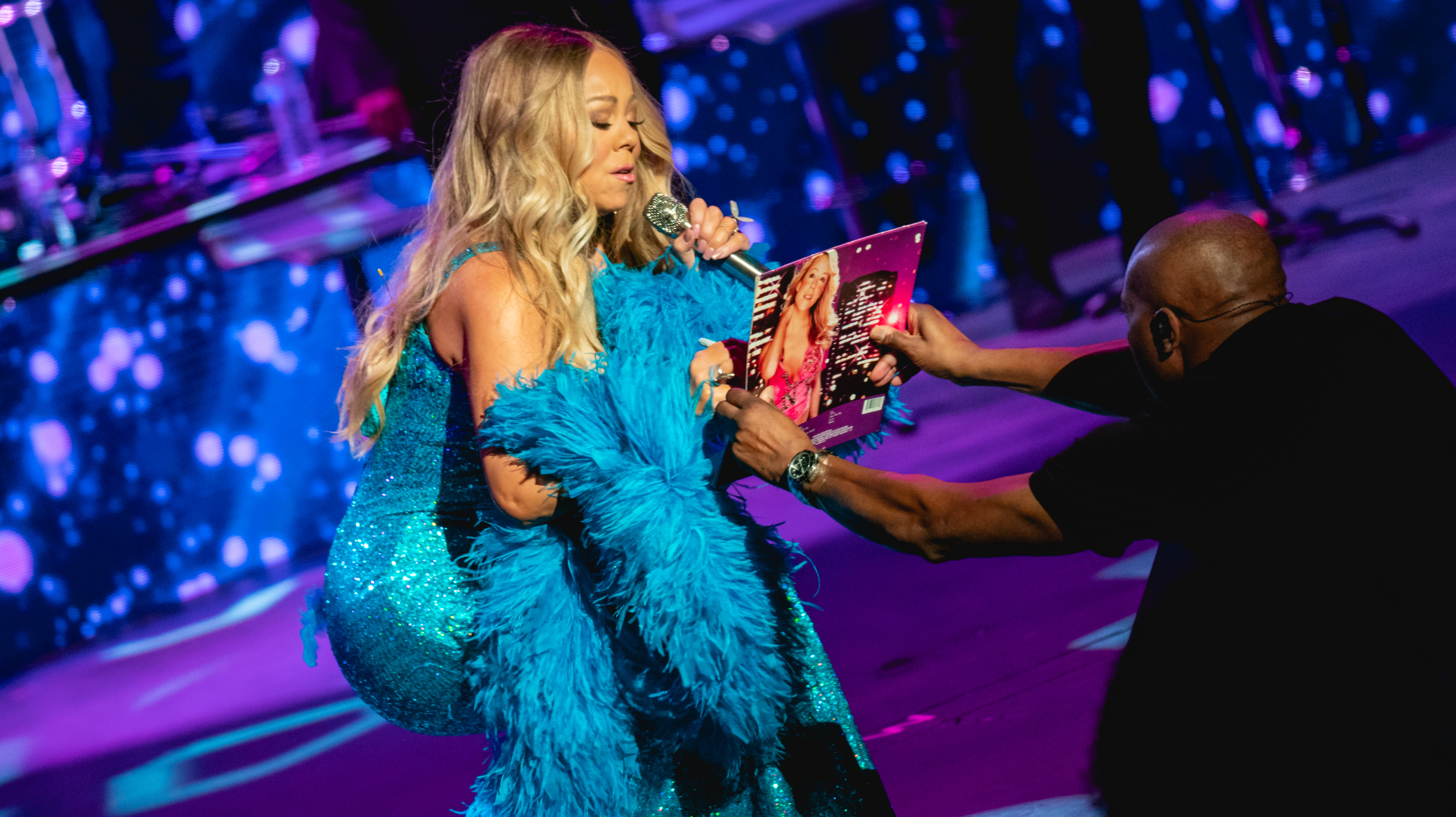
Carey signing a vinyl copy of her album Glitter for a fan in 2019

Carey's fanbase is known as the "Lambily", a portmanteau of "lamb" and "family". The name derived from Carey's use of the word as a term of endearment in the early 2000s when she would leave voice memos and messages on her website for her fans. With over 10 million followers in April 2013, Carey was one of the most popular musicians on Twitter.

Carey has often noted that she feels a close bond with her fans. Emily Lordi of The New Yorker wrote that she "makes an effort to preserve her relationship with her fans", adding that Carey "does not lament the need to perform for them constantly at the peak of her career, or recount any scary brushes with obsessed followers". In her 2020 memoir, Carey recounted the moment when she performed a concert special in 1993 (Note: Later released as a video album titled Here Is Mariah Carey.) noting that due to her fans' presence, it was one of the first times she had come to understand her level of fame.

Carey's fans are credited with originating the internet term "skinny legend", which was often used as a form of praise and endearment for their idol. The term has since been used for other celebrities including Christina Aguilera and Raini Rodriguez. In 2018, as part of a build-up to Carey's then-upcoming album, Caution, Carey's fans started a campaign titled #JusticeforGlitter which resulted in pushing Carey's 2001 album, Glitter, to the top of the iTunes albums charts in several countries including the United States.

=== Eminem feud ===
Carey has been involved in a publicised feud with American rapper Eminem which has gone on to become one of the most infamous feuds from the 2000s. Eminem alleged that he had a relationship with Carey in 2002, which prompted Carey to release a diss track titled "Clown" on Charmbracelet. The two went back and forth in various years until it culminated in 2009 with the release of Carey's song "Obsessed" from her twelfth studio album Memoirs of an Imperfect Angel. Critics heavily compared its lyrics to the relationship between Carey and Eminem and suggested that Carey alluded to him and his "obsession" with her. While "Obsessed" never mentioned the rapper by name, many reviewers felt it to be very obvious. Additionally, Carey played a role that resembled the rapper in the song's accompanying music video. Eminem replied with "The Warning".

== Persona and style ==
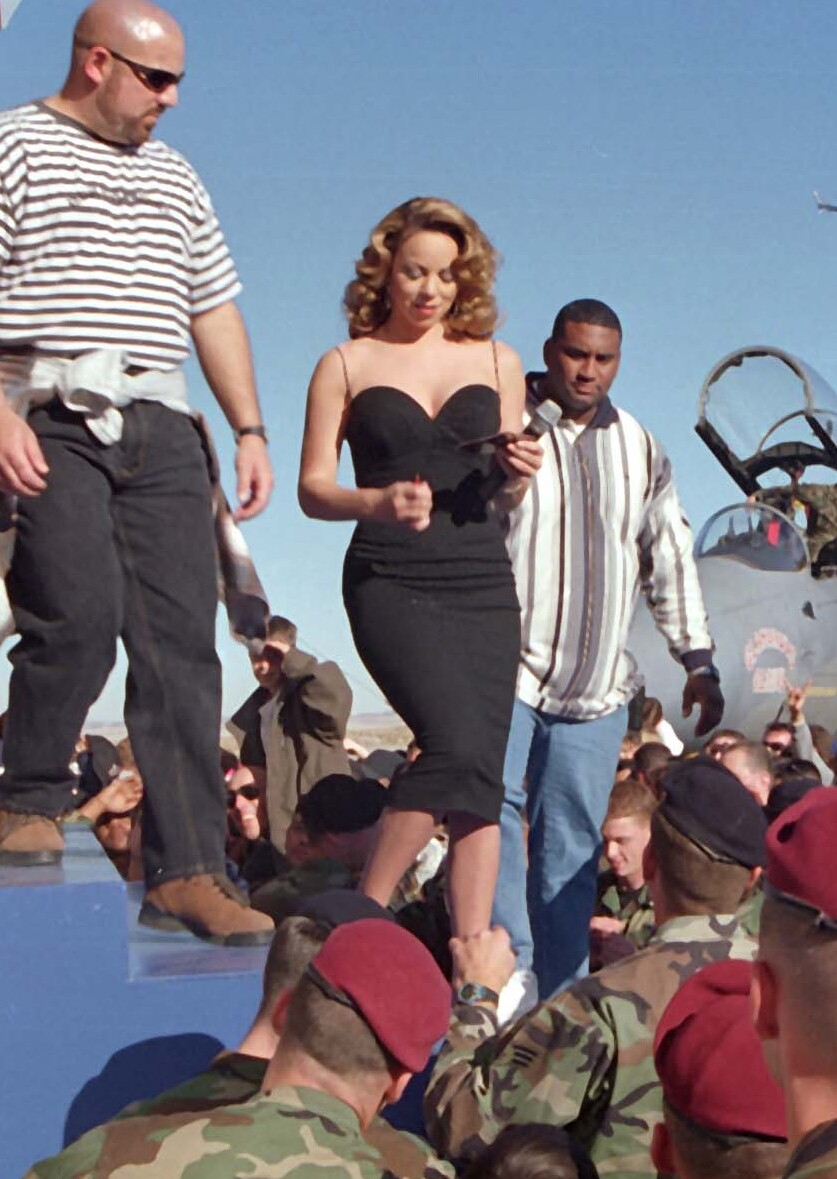
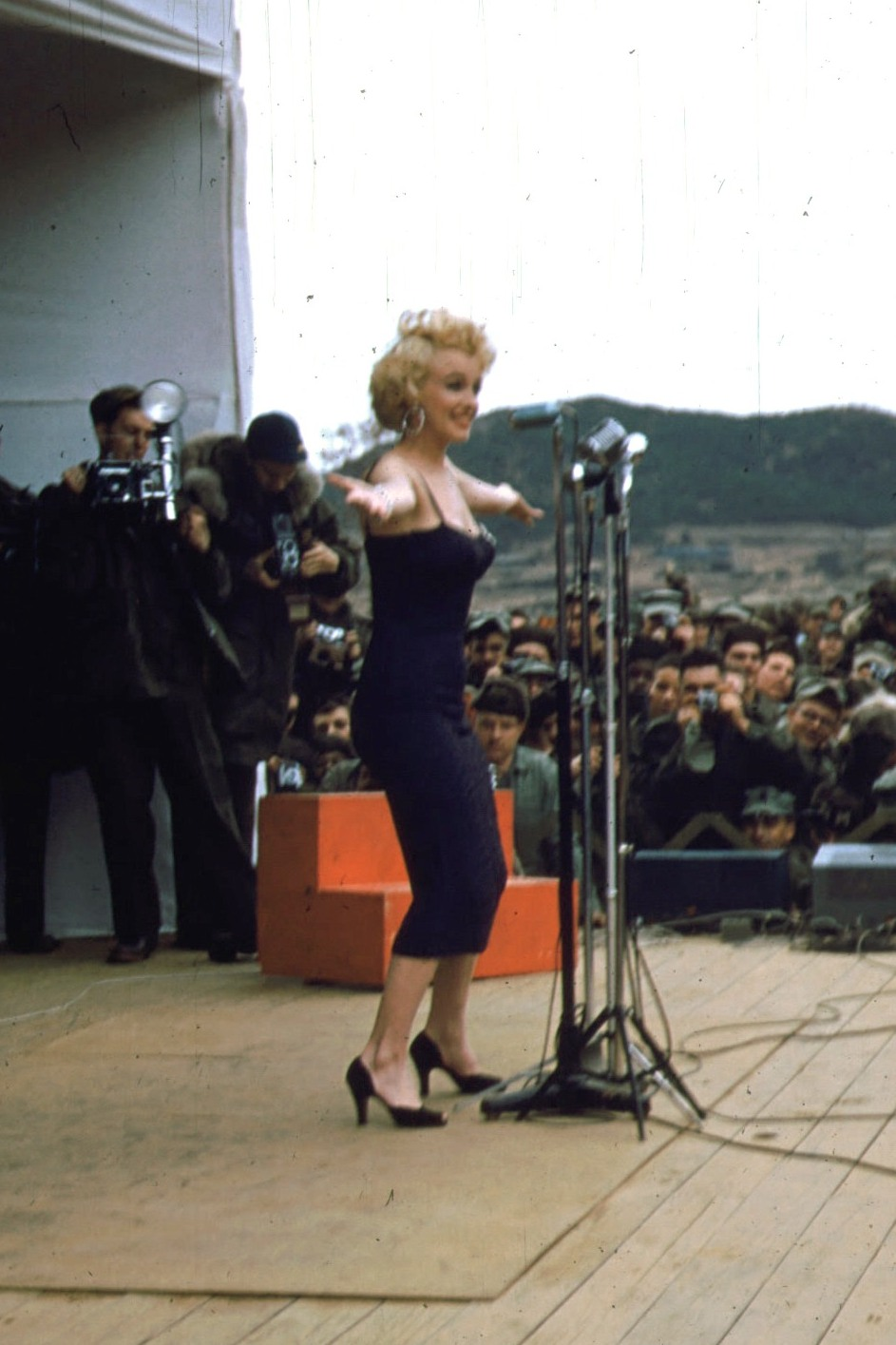
Carey has cited American actress Marilyn Monroe (right) as a style icon; Carey (pictured left) drew inspiration from Monroe's 1953 visit to US troops in Korea for her "I Still Believe" music video in 1998.

Carey has also been called a pop icon in the media. Her style has been described as "eccentric" and "over the top". Writer Noah Berlatsky noted that "Carey has always reveled in uber-feminine, girly imagery", with her album titles such as Butterfly, Rainbow, Glitter and Charmbracelet being prime examples. Tom Breihan of Stereogum wrote in 2015 that "decades from now, we will be looking back at Mariah Carey as one of the most gloriously batshit pop stars of all time."

Carey cites American actress Marilyn Monroe as not only one of her biggest idols but also her style and beauty icon, and has referenced Monroe in various stages of her career, including imitating her in her music videos for "I Still Believe" and "Don't Forget About Us". Emilia Petrarca of W opined that while Carey is "uber-cautious about cultivating her public image", that when it comes to style, she is "more do than don't".

=== Diva personality ===
Carey has often been labeled a "diva" for her stardom and persona. Paper labelled her the "ultimate diva". Interviewing Carey for an article, The Guardian writer Hadley Freeman felt that interviewing and talking with Carey was the closest she had come to imagining how it would have been to spend time with original pop divas such as Bette Davis or Aretha Franklin. She noted that the diva term "is a term she has laboured under throughout her career, and it is unlikely she will escape it" but praised Carey for her "true-to-herself honesty" calling her a "proper grande dame of the old school". The Guardian writer Elizabeth Day opined that Carey's "diva-ish antics are simply part of the package that her fans buy into".

While the term often has negative connotations, Carey herself has embraced the title stating that she gets her diva nature from her mother who was an opera singer, calling her a real "Juilliard diva". She called it a "compliment" and that the stories about her being a difficult diva "are just not true and [she's] learned to shake them off". In 2022, Carey appeared on a podcast interview with Meghan Markle, Duchess of Sussex and discussed the dual connotations to the word "diva". Carey felt that in today's media, the term "means you're a successful woman usually" but "it's not okay for you to be a boss [...] or a strong woman".

=== Alter ego ===
In 1995, while recording her album Daydream, Carey secretly recorded and produced the alternative rock album Someone's Ugly Daughter with her friend Clarissa Dane, under the moniker "Chick". Her contributions were kept secret until the release of her 2020 memoir in which she stated that, "I created an alter-ego artist and her Ziggy Stardust-like spoof band" adding that the "character was a dark-haired brooding Goth girl who wrote and sang ridiculous tortured songs".

A version of her aforementioned alter ego, named Bianca Storm, appeared for the first time in 1999, for the music video of Carey's single "Heartbreaker". During the video, Carey appears as both herself and Bianca, who's wearing a red seductive outfit with a bag in which she carries her dog around. The two end up having a physical fight in the cinema bathroom, in which Bianca is ultimately defeated. Carey has since revitalized the character on multiple occasions, including the music videos for "Boy (I Need You)", "Heartbreaker (Remix)" and the 2016 docu-series Mariah's World.

== Physical appearance ==
=== Body and wellness ===
Throughout her career, Carey has become known to refer to the left side of her face as her "bad side" due to a beauty mark near her lips. In an episode of Mariah's World (2016), Carey explained that when she was 19, a photographer at her first-ever photoshoot told her she should only ever be shot from the right, resulting in the insecurity. Carey has also been particular about the lighting used when photographing her and has expressed her disdain for overhead lighting numerous times. American Singer Britney Spears cited Carey as an early user of ring lights when she met her backstage at an awards show in 1999.

Carey has often received body shaming critical comments from media outlets and on social media about her weight fluctuations. In 2011, she received favorable media attention following a weight loss, becoming a spokesperson for the American nutrition company Jenny Craig.

=== Fashion ===
Fashion has been a large part of Carey's image and career. She was cited as a fashion icon by Insider Inc. writer Susanna Heller who added that "her decadent closet spans multiple rooms and is full of designer clothing, lingerie, shoes, and accessories". Vogue writer Christian Allaire stated that Carey has "rarely hit without her evening gowns, often embellished with crystals, sequins, or feathers." Laura Antonia Jordan of Grazia called Carey fashion "royalty" and stated that in the 1990s, her go-to looks were "super-tight silhouettes, cropped tops, thigh-grazing hemlines and dangerously high slits." During her tours, Carey has frequently worn Jimmy Choo and Christian Louboutin high-end stiletto footwear, as well as leotards, corsets, and fishnet tights.

Carey has often received polarized responses for her revealing clothes, and has been called a sex symbol. She showed up in what was described as 'revealing clothes' for the first time at the 1997 MTV Video Music Awards, a few months after announcing her separation from Mottola, wearing a Calvin Klein two-piece look, which has since been described by Elle as one of the "top 10 'revenge dress' moments that shaped pop culture". At the next year's ceremony, she wore matching dresses with American singer Whitney Houston, before both singers ripped off fabric from the dresses to reveal two distinct looks. The moment was inspired by the rumours of the rivalry between the singers and it was recreated by Dua Lipa and Megan Thee Stallion at the 2022 Grammy Awards. In 2000, Carey appeared on The Rosie O'Donnell Show where Rosie O'Donnell asked her about a "trampy" dress she had worn at the 2000 American Music Awards. Carey responded in defence that she wanted to dress free after the covered-up looks that were chosen for her during the early part of her career. BuzzFeed writer Ryan Schocket called the incident one of the various times the "media absolutely failed her". CR Fashion Book writer Shepherd noted that while Carey's "sartorial aesthetic has shifted here and there [...] Carey largely favors sexy, skin-baring, and often bedazzled looks.

Carey has received attention for her various music video looks throughout her career. She received praise for her outfit in the music video for "Honey" which saw Carey wearing a Dolce & Gabbana dress, followed by a moment in a white bra-and-skirt combo. She has been credited for starting the trend of wearing low-rise jeans in the early 2000s, after cutting off the waistband of the denim pants she wore for the music video of "Heartbreaker" (1999). Liana Satenstein of Vogue wrote that Carey was "quintessential" to the movement, calling it a "spur-of-the-moment creation". Nylon writer India Roby also noted that Carey "kicked off the millennium with a denim look that shook the fashion DIY space". Conversely, ¡Hola! writer Natalia Trejo opined that the trend was accredited to Alexander McQueen, although did note that Carey "definitely made a fashion statement".

Carey is also well known for the fashion and outfits she wears in her Christmas concerts and performances. The singer has also incorporated holiday-themed outfits throughout her music videos. Billboard noted that "over the years, [Carey] has rocked nearly every shade of red for the season's fashions, from plunging gowns and floor-length coats to ensembles inspired by Santa, Mrs. Claus and The Nutcracker's toy soldiers. She's also a pro at pulling off winter white, whether she's wearing a snow-white dress covered in crystals or a fluffy hood tailor-made for keeping the December chill at bay."

== Meme culture ==
Carey (pictured) in her 2023 yearly "It's Time" video, playing to the popular meme about her "defrosting" in time for the holiday season

Throughout her career, Carey has been used in several social media memes, having had a "continual contribution to the meme economy". Kyle Munzenrieder from W stated that "Carey has tended to play coy when it comes to her meme-queen status". Despite this, during her Billboard Icon Award speech at the 2019 Billboard Music Awards, Carey made reference to the "ups and downs" of her career, noting that "there's been a few memes". Brooke Marine, writing for W, noted that over her career, Carey has been a part of several pop culture moments, and "has been at times responsible and at other times unwittingly drawn into, including some of the Internet's most longstanding memes". Similarly, Danette Chavez of The A.V. Club felt that Carey has figured out how to navigate "internet fame and being meme-able" adding that she is savvy and knows when and how to control it. In a separate article, Munzenrieder called Carey the "Thanos of the Internet" for elevating to a level where she no longer creates memes but can also end a recurring meme.

In 2014, Carey posted on her Instagram photos of herself in a bright blue gown, riding a Subway in New York City with the hashtag, #subwayincouture. The incident garnered media attention with Munzenrieder retrospectively calling it "infamous". Carey later referenced it in her music video for the song "A No No". In 2019, Carey also responded to public concerns over FaceApp, tweeting on her Twitter account that the app is "not something I acknowledge". That same year Carey participated in the Bottle Cap Challenge which had seen various internet users kicking loosened caps off of bottles. Carey used her signature whistle register to knock the cap off a bottle. A year later in 2020, Twitter users began referring to her as "Comrade Carey" after a quote from an interview she had about how the systems reinforced by capitalism did not support her and her family while growing up went viral on the app.

Throughout her career, Carey has been recognised for her ability to throw shade. In 2003, when asked about American singer Jennifer Lopez in a German TV interview, Carey's response was, "I don't know her". The clip went on to became one of the first viral internet memes. In 2016, Elle called Carey the "Queen of Shade". Vogue writer Christian Allaire called Carey a "true social media savant" noting that she "routinely re-share memes about herself from fans, throwing shade at others in the process". Vanity Fair writer Kenzie Bryant noted that "Carey has been forced to confront her comment many times over the years" by fans and on various talk shows. In later years, she has reused the phrase various times to shade Lopez and other artists such as Demi Lovato.

Carey has often made jokes about her refusal to acknowledge the passing of time, which in turn has become a recurring meme. The Cut writer Hannah Gold noted that Carey's "collapsibility of time is a notion essential to her art", feeling that it adds to her diva persona. In The Meaning of Mariah Carey, Carey stated that "not living based on time became a way to hold on to myself, to keep close and keep alive that inner child of mine. It's why I gravitate toward enduring characters like Santa Claus, the Tooth Fairy and Tinker Bell. They remind me we can be timeless." Carey also celebrates anniversaries rather than birthdays.

Carey's influence as a holiday icon has inspired several holiday-inspired memes. The most popular meme began in 2017 after people online began to notice that the song resurfaces during the holiday season on a regular basis, in which people responded by creating memes about Carey "defrosting" and thawing in time for the Christmas season. In response to this memes, Carey called it funny and cute, opining that "it's in my zone of loving and living for Christmas". Another meme shows retail workers' disdain for the song due to its frequent airplay at their jobs, which sometimes require the round-the-clock display of Christmas music during the holiday season. There have also been memes about the royalties Carey earns every Christmas due to the popularity of "All I Want for Christmas Is You".

== Gay icon ==
Due to her large gay fanbase and her impact on the LGBTQ+ community, Carey is recognized as a gay icon. Most notably, Carey's 1993 song "Hero" has been regarded as a gay anthem as it touches upon themes of embracing individuality and overcoming self-doubt. In 2023, Rolling Stone ranking the song at number 14 in their list of the 50 Most Inspirational LGBTQ Songs of All Time. Tim Chan, writing for Rolling Stone, noted that the song was a "source of hope and conviction that became even more personal after Carey's own well-publicized struggles". Carey's gay fans have also often noted relating to her 1997 song "Outside" which portrays the feeling of isolation and irregularity. In the bridge of the song, Carey sings that "blind and unguided, into a world divided, you're thrown" in which originally acted as a reference to her racial heritage, but could be universally related to the experience of a queer person. The Guardian writer Ian Eagleton found Carey to be a LGBTQ+ role model, adding that "she taught me that I had no choice: I had to survive". Gay athlete Kerron Clement admitted that Carey's music helped him come to terms with his identity, noting that "I didn't know of any other gay people growing up. I listened to a lot of Mariah Carey. I related a lot to the lyrics on her Butterfly album, particularly a song called "Outside" that's about not fitting in. I would listen to it nonstop. I know for her she was singing about her biracial identity, but I related it to how I felt about my sexuality".

Her diva persona has also given her much admiration from gay fans. Writing for Vice, writer Jake Hall noted in an analysis of gay icons, that "there is a reason traditional music divas like Mariah [...] have historically been framed within an LGBTQ+ context; because many of them have engaged with our community and been outspoken and supportive of our struggles". Ian Kumamoto, writer for HuffPost noted that Carey's music made the LGBTQ+ community "feel seen and contributed to [their] confidence and self-worth". In 2016, Carey was honored by GLAAD with the GLAAD Ally Award. In her speech, Carey expressed gratitude to her LGBTQ+ fans, wishing them "love, peace, [and] harmony".

Carey has also been the subject of numerous drag queens in their performances. Kiara and Pangina Heals both impersonated Carey for the Drag Race segment Snatch Game. Other drag acts who have impersonated Carey include Shangela, Derrick Barry, Milk, Cynthia Lee Fontaine and Plastique Tiara, among others. Pride Magazine's writer Zachary Zane noted that "Carey is a significantly easy role to play [for drag queens] because she is a true diva. She has her iconic over-it attitude along with major pipes and major breasts".

== Queen of Christmas ==
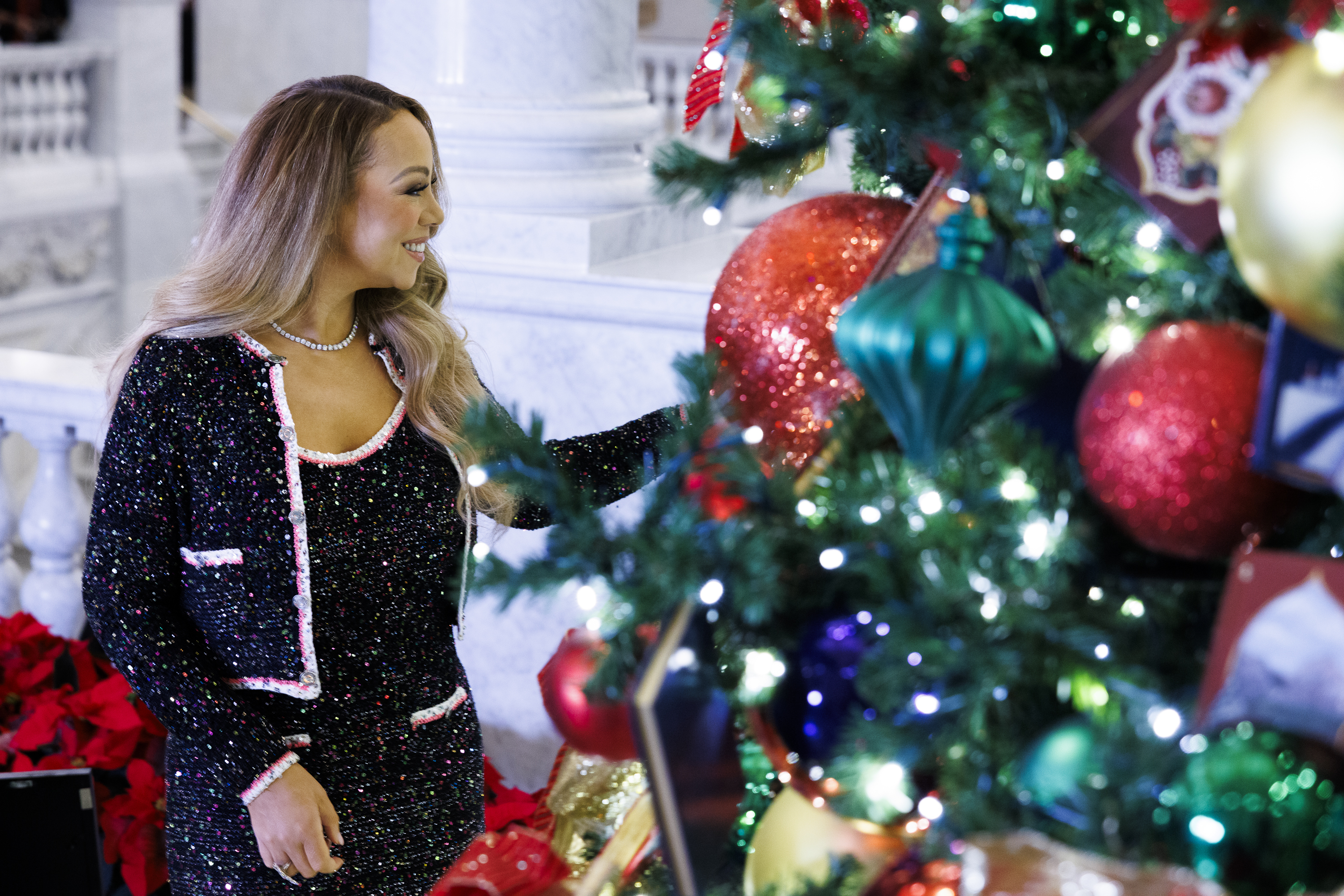
Carey standing next to a Christmas tree at the Library of Congress in Washington, D.C. where her song "All I Want for Christmas Is You" was inducted into the Library for its cultural sound heritage

"All I Want for Christmas Is You", as well as its parent album Merry Christmas (1994), have become such a ubiquitous part of wider popular culture that Carey's name became synonymous with the season, and she has since been dubbed the "Queen of Christmas". Multiple media sources have since cited Carey as a holiday icon. Additionally, both the song and album were hailed as being "one of the few worthy modern additions to the holiday canon" by The New Yorker in 2006. When asked about whether or not she's worried that people might associate her predominantly with holiday music, Carey said that "I do some of my other hits too [...] and thankfully the kids seem to sing along. It's what I've been worried about too, that people would only know me for Christmas. But in a way, I wouldn't care, because I do just love Christmas so much".

The song specifically has received critical acclaim and has become a Christmas standard. Forbes writer Lauren Alvarez called the song the "unofficial song of Christmas each year". Speaking to Vogue in 2015, Elvis Duran stated that the song's appeal was based on the fact that it was "a modern song that could actually have been a hit back in the '40s", praising its "timeless, classic quality". The success of the song, in particular, has led Carey to build what Billboard described as a "growing holiday mini-empire". Carey and the song were referenced in the Marvel Studios' What If...? (2023) episode "What If... Happy Hogan Saved Christmas?".

The song has also garnered Carey several achievements, including becoming her nineteenth number-one song on the Billboard Hot 100. In 2021, Forbes reported that the song has earned approximately $60 million since 1994. The song has broken numerous Spotify records, and was ranked by Billboard as the greatest holiday song of all time. The song was also selected by the Library of Congress for preservation in the National Recording Registry in 2023, based on its "cultural, historical or aesthetic importance in the nation's recorded sound heritage."

=== Tours and specials ===
While Carey did not officially tour for Merry Christmas after its release in 1994, she performed a live concert at the Cathedral of St. John the Divine on December 8, 1994. In 2001, she participated in CBS's third annual holiday special, "A Home for the Holidays With Mariah Carey", which promoted adoption and saw performances from herself amongst other artists. To promote her second Christmas album, Merry Christmas II You (2010), Carey hosted her first Christmas television special Mariah Carey: Merry Christmas to You, pre-recorded and broadcast through ABC. In 2013, Carey appeared with Michael Bublé on his 3rd Annual Christmas Special to perform "All I Want for Christmas Is You" as a duet.

Since 2014, Carey has either toured or held mini residencies for the Christmas season. Billboard writer Eric Frankenberg noted that Carey has "put in the work each year and assumed her [Queen of Christmas] throne on stage as well". From 2014 to 2019, Carey performed a concert residency, All I Want for Christmas Is You: A Night of Joy and Festivity. In 2015, Carey directed and starred in the Hallmark Channel Christmas television film A Christmas Melody (2015). She also hosted the special Mariah Carey's Merriest Christmas (2015) on the same channel where she performed various songs from her Christmas discography. The special became the network's most-viewed show.

In December 2016, Carey appeared on The Keys of Christmas (2016), a Christmas special hosted on YouTube, alongside YouTube's top music personalities including DJ Khaled and Rudy Mancuso. In 2017, Carey released an animated film Mariah Carey's All I Want For Christmas Is You (2017) which was based on a book she released in 2015 of the same name. Carey voiced the narrator and also performed the soundtrack's lead single, "Lil Snowman". That same year, she performed "The Star" for the animated film of the same. The song was later nominated for the Golden Globe Award for Best Original Song at the 75th Golden Globe Awards.

In 2020, during the COVID-19 pandemic, Carey released a Christmas special titled Mariah Carey's Magical Christmas Special (2020). Released through Apple TV+, Billboard and The Hollywood Reporter reported that the special hit number-one in over 100 countries. The special received positive reviews from critics and was described by Decider writer Brett White as a revival of 21st century holiday specials that were popular on television throughout the 1960s. A year later, Carey released a sequel titled Mariah's Christmas: The Magic Continues (2021).

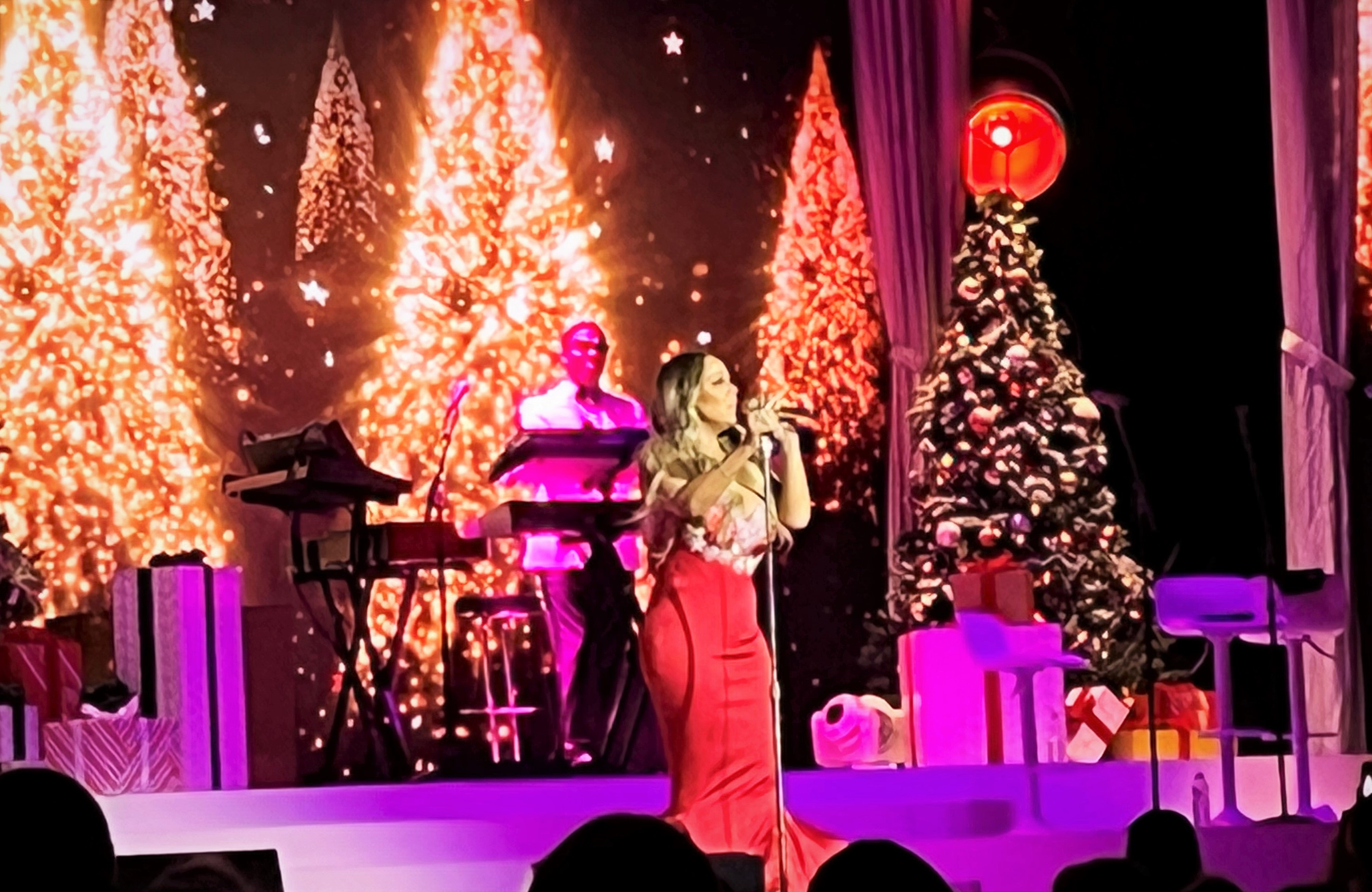
Carey performing on the Merry Christmas to All! Tour in December 9, 2022

In 2022, Carey embarked on mini-concert tour titled the Merry Christmas to All! Tour, which was later adapted into a television special (Note: subtitled Mariah Carey: Merry Christmas to All!) which aired on CBS and Paramount+. The special became most watched program of the night, drawing in a total of 3.8 million viewers and a 0.4 demo rating. Her 2023 tour, Merry Christmas One and All!, also received high praise from critics. Billboard reported that the tour grossed almost $30 million, selling more than 200,000 tickets, becoming her largest attendance since her Butterfly World Tour in 1997. In 2024, Carey embarked on the Mariah Carey's Christmas Time tour. In 2025, the tour was extended into a concert residency at the Dolby Live theatre in Las Vegas. On December 14, the show's final performance that year was broadcast exclusively on TikTok and Apple Music, subtitled "Mariah Carey's Here For It All Holiday Special". The tour was extended internationally in 2026.

=== "It's Time" yearly videos ===
Capitalizing on the continued popularity of "All I Want for Christmas Is You" after its peak atop the Hot 100 in 2019, Carey has made it an annual tradition to post a video on her social media accounts at midnight on November 1, declaring that "it's time" to start playing Christmas music. The videos were created in response to another phrase made popular by Carey who would say "not yet" when people would play Christmas music before the season had begun. Carey noted that her videos would signal when "it's time".

- In 2019, Carey's video shows her falling asleep in a Cyndi Lauper-inspired Halloween outfit, and waking up in Christmas-themed pyjamas, first uttering her popular phrase, "It's Time".
- In 2020, Carey's video featured a "creepy ghoulie" opening a cobweb-ridden door with the message "Not Yet" written on the door. Behind the door, Carey sat in a magical Christmas room declaring "It's Time (But let's get through Thanksgiving first)".
- In 2021, Carey smashed a pumpkin (in reference to Halloween) with a giant candy cane.
- In 2022, Carey dressed as a witch, riding a static exercise bike and cackling before being transformed into a Mrs. Claus-inspired outfit, swapping the exercise bike for a reindeer. The video marked the first time Carey used her signature whistle tone to say "it's time" for Christmas.
- In 2023, Carey's video featured herself frozen in a block of ice, being set free by Halloween-inspired creatures, with hairdryers, melting the ice around her. Carey whistles "it's time" before the ice shatters, and she's revealed in a red and white Santa jumpsuit. This video was inspired by the popular meme about Carey "defrosting" in time for Christmas.
- In 2024, Carey dressed as Morticia Addams from The Addams Family, dancing with a man who represented Gomez Addams. Carey then opens a cabinet to reveal herself in a red and white Santa jumper, using her whistle register to say "it's time" before Gomez is transformed into a snowman. The video was released in partnership with Kay Jewelers.
- In 2025, Carey's video was directed by Joseph Kahn, and saw Carey arguing with a Christmas elf (portrayed by Billy Eichner who previously appeared as an Elf in Mariah Carey's Magical Christmas Special) for stealing her Sephora beauty essentials and going on strike with the other elves. The video was described as the "basis of Sephora's holiday campaign".
- In 2026, Carey is shown in the video performing "Hermit" from her unreleased album Someone's Ugly Daughter before the screen crashes into a winter wonderland with Carey as a tree-topper on an enormous Christmas tree. The video was released in partnership with Sol de Janeiro.

=== Legal issues ===
Carey initially rejected the "Queen of Christmas" title, saying that "Mother Mary is the Queen of Christmas". Despite this, in March 2021, she attempted to trademark the phrase "Queen of Christmas", which received backlash from singers Darlene Love and Elizabeth Chan. In November 2022, the Trademark Trial and Appeal Board denied Carey's request.

In June 2022, Andy Stone of Vince Vance & the Valiants filed a lawsuit against Carey over alleged copyright infringement of his country ballad "All I Want for Christmas Is You". Stone alleged that Carey had stolen the song title from his song, demanding at least $20 million in damages from her, co-writer Walter Afanasieff and Sony Music Entertainment. The case was dropped in November of that year. In November 2023, Stone filed a similar complaint over the same alleged copyright infringement. In March 2025, a judge ruled that "Stone's lawyers had not 'met their burden of showing' that the two songs were 'substantially similar'". The judge added that Stone and his lawyers would face "sanctions for filing 'frivolous' arguments, including 'vague [...] and incomprehensible mixtures of factual assertions and conclusions, subjective opinions and other irrelevant evidence'". In December of that year, court documents revealed that Carey would be awarded $92,000 from Stone in sanctions.

== See also ==
- Women in music
- Honorific nicknames in popular music
