= Who? Weekly =

Pop culture podcast

Who Weekly
- Who? Weekly logo
- Genre: Comedy, Talk
- Language: English

Cast and voices
- Hosted by: Bobby Finger and Lindsey Weber

Production
- Length: Approx. 45 minutes

Publication
- Original release: 18 January 2016 – present
- Updates: Biweekly

Who? Weekly is a semi-weekly celebrity gossip podcast presented by Bobby Finger and Lindsey Weber. Focusing on tabloid coverage of celebrities, it tackles, according to the tagline, "everything you need to know about the celebrities you don't".

== History ==
Who? Weekly began as an occasional newsletter written by friends and pop-culture writers Bobby Finger and Lindsey Weber before spinning off into a podcast. The first episode was aired on January 18, 2016 on the HeadGum network, and later via Cadence13. The podcast is currently released independently.

In both the newsletter and in the podcast, celebrities, ex-reality television contestants, YouTube stars, Broadway actors, and social media influencers are categorized as either "Whos" or "Thems" – roughly D-list vs A-list celebrities – according to their name recognition and the nature of their fame. Whos and Thems are named for the likely response to hearing a person's name: "who?" vs "oh, them!" This extends into, for example, describing behavior as "who-y", if it is seen as self-promotional or tacky, for example producing "sponcon" (sponsored content) or writing public apologies on Notes app. Although mainly dividing the celebrity landscape between "Whos" and "Thems", the podcast has also created the categories "T.H.A.M.P.S." (or THAMPS) for the pseudo-famous Trainers, Hairstylists, Agents, Makeup Artists, Publicists and Stylists, and "Nahs" for people that might be in the public eye, but are not famous enough to even be considered a Who.

The duo continued releasing weekly newsletters as an accompaniment to the podcast episodes for paid supporters on Patreon. As of 2020, the newsletter has been replaced with Who? Daily, consisting of four mini-episodes a week with stories not covered in the main podcast episodes.

Beginning in October 2017, there have been a series of live Who? Weekly shows across the United States.

On February 19, 2021, Who Weekly released its 500th episode.

== Format and recurring segments ==
Episodes air twice weekly and alternate between the main episode discussing topical celebrity news and "Who's There" episodes, which consist of responses to callers' questions and stories left on the podcast hotline.

=== Main episode ===
==== I Don’t Know Her ====
Described as a "deranged version of six degrees of separation", the hosts speculate if a specific 'Them' celebrity knows a specific 'Who' celebrity.

==== What's Rita Up To? ====
Main episodes end with the segment What's Rita Up To?, featuring an update on the activities of singer Rita Ora. They cover what the tabloids write about her and her relative anonymity in the United States.

==== The Most Markle-est Headline of the Week ====
In the lead up to the wedding of Prince Harry and Meghan Markle in 2018, a recurring segment looked at news articles pertaining to the wedding, often revolving around Markle's various family members speaking to the press. The segment returned periodically since the wedding occurred.

==== Benana ====
Finger and Weber coined the term 'Benana' to refer to the relationship of actors Ben Affleck and Ana de Armas and started a weekly segment looking at what the couple had done that week. The segment ended in 2021 after the couple separated.

==== Beckham Watch ====
Finger and Weber have a segment dedicated to the children of David Beckham and Victoria Beckham called Beckham Watch. It was discontinued after the pair came to the conclusion that the children were not doing anything interesting enough to justify coverage. A short time later the segment was revived when it was reported brothers Brooklyn and Romeo were feuding.

==== Sign-offs ====
Callers traditionally sign-off with in-jokes from earlier episodes, - the most iconic being, "crunch crunch!" - but including: "Good form, Bella Thorne", "Me in Greece", "ScarJo YummyPop", "Forehead Diamond", "Grateful for Charna!", "Livin' la vida laptop", "Tim Tebow Lesbian", and "Women don't belong in balloons".

=== Who's There ===
Who's There is weekly call-in show where listeners can call in and ask questions or provide comment for the pair to react to. These episodes were introduced after fans began contacting the hosts asking about the identity of various celebrities. The hosts consider the call-in show an integral part of the podcast as it opened up a dialogue between the hosts and their fan base and created a sense of community between the fans.

Traditionally, call in guests start their calls with 'Hi, Lindsey Bobby.' After introducing research editorial assistant, Timmy, to the show's team it has become common for guest to start a call with 'Hi BLT' (an abbreviation of Bobby, Lindsey, Timmy) or 'Hi Lindsey Bobby Timmy.'

=== Who Dat? ===
"Who Dat?" was an occasional episode focusing on Black celebrities, which first occurred in 2016. The episodes feature guest hosts Aminatou Sow and Shani O. Hilton. As of 2020, this segment has been discontinued, aiming to integrate this content into the main show.

== Fanbase ==
Who? Weekly fans are collectively called Wholigans. The Wholigan Facebook group has 17,000 members and includes not only listeners but industry insiders who discuss celebrity sightings, news, rumors and deep dives. Notably, the search for "who-y" behavior has led the group to discover in 2017 that then-White House Press Secretary Sean Spicer had an open account on mobile payment service Venmo. They began asking for payments as a form of trolling, causing some press attention.

Celebrity callers to Who's There have included Lena Dunham, Lea DeLaria, and Richard Curtis.

== Reception ==
Slate's Brow Beat described Who? Weekly as "terrific" and said that the show "feels smart and fun because it’s sometimes messy, not in spite of its messiness". The podcast was chosen as one of the best podcasts of 2016 by The New York Times, who said that "the podcast feels delightfully absurd and truly vital in the Trump era", and by Vulture, who said it "has quickly become a cult hit". It has also been recommended by Nylon, Esquire, Marie Claire, Vogue, and The New Yorker.
