= Someone's Ugly Daughter =

1995 studio album by Chick

Studio album by Chick
- Released: September 5, 1995
- Recorded: 1995
- Studio: The Hit Factory (New York City)
- Genre: Alternative rock
- Length: 36:26
- Labels: Epic; 550
- Producer: Chick

Singles from Someone's Ugly Daughter
- 1. "Malibu" Released: August 22, 1995; 2. "Demented" Released: September 5, 1995

Someone's Ugly Daughter is the only studio album by the American alternative rock band Chick, composed of lead vocalist Clarissa Dane and backing vocalist Mariah Carey. It was released on September 5, 1995, through Epic Records and 550 Music.

In September 2020, Carey revealed in her memoir The Meaning of Mariah Carey that she secretly recorded and co-produced the album with Dane, a friend of hers, under the moniker "Chick". It was made at the time Carey was recording her fifth studio album, Daydream (1995).

== Background ==
I was exploring my musical range, but I was also filled with rage. It's always been a challenge for me to acknowledge and express anger. My personal life was suffocating during Daydream, and I was in desperate need of release.

— Carey, in her memoir The Meaning of Mariah Carey

Carey worked on Someone's Ugly Daughter while recording her 1995 album Daydream. She originally provided lead vocals until her label intervened and told her the album could not be released in that form, due to worries that it would damage her clean-cut image and thriving career. As a compromise, Carey enlisted a friend, singer Clarissa Dane, to recut the album's lead vocals while she did uncredited background vocals instead.

Prior to revealing her role in the recording, Carey has hinted at the existence of the album. In 1995, she sarcastically said in an interview that her new album would be "an alternative record", referring to her work on Someone's Ugly Daughter. In 1999, she said in an interview with Craig Seymour,

"As a songwriter, I'm capable of writing more mainstream stuff or adapting a hip hop record to be my thing, or a house record or probably a country song, you know what I mean? Or even, like, no one knows, but I've written some alternative things that nobody knows about. I'm a musical person."

In 2003, when asked about the name of her label Crave Records, Carey felt that she was not ready to reveal the true origin of the name. "It came from a song I wrote that no one's ever heard. It's a secret. One day I'll talk about it." The name of the song was later revealed in her memoir to be "Demented". After revealing her role in the album's recording, Carey said she was looking for the original recordings of the album with her lead vocals. In December 2020, she confirmed in an Apple Music interview that she had found the version of the album with her vocals but was still looking for the original board mixes. The album was recorded in The Hit Factory in Manhattan, New York and Carey wrote in her memoir The Meaning of Mariah Carey,

"I created an alter-ego artist and her Ziggy Stardust-like spoof band. My character was a dark-haired brooding goth girl [a version of her, Bianca, showed up a few years later in the 'Heartbreaker' video] who wrote and sang ridiculous tortured songs." Carey expressed in her memoir she "looked forward to doing her alter-ego sessions after recording Daydream each night".

== Conception and composition ==
I'd bring my little alt-rock song to the band and hum a silly guitar riff. They would pick it up and we would record it immediately. It was irreverent, raw, and urgent, and the band got into it. I actually started to love some of the songs.

— Carey, in her memoir The Meaning of Mariah Carey

While working on Daydream, Carey's longtime writing partner and producer Walter Afanasieff mentioned that they explored the notion of making punk music just for fun. Originally titled Eel Tree, he said with the project, "Carey had an idea built around Malibu Barbie". He added, Carey was inspired by bands like Hole, Garbage, and Sleater-Kinney and "channeled frustrations about her marriage into the music". In her memoir, Carey said, she was "playing with the style of the breezy-grunge, punk-light white female singers who were popular at the time," allowing herself to express her misery and be carefree with her feelings throughout the creation of the album. She could be "angry, angsty, and messy", but was also able to laugh.

Gary Cirimelli, the guitarist for Chick, noted how impromptu the whole project was. "We all had been doing the 'professional music business' thing, and this brought us back to just playing for fun. There were no expectations." Dana Jon Chappelle, Carey's longtime engineer and someone who witnessed the band's natural progression, added, "It just sort of happened. There was a drum kit in the room, and ideas started floating between her and Walter."

After working on Daydream during the day, everyone would switch to recording what would be Someone's Ugly Daughter around midnight, even going as late as six in the morning. Cirimelli noted the entire process was old school, "We would be recording on Sony 48-track reels. Then, we would pull the reels off, throw on a blank reel, and start cutting. There was no programming involved." Cirimelli said the songwriting and arrangements happened quickly and organically. "[Mariah] would come in with half a song, and within 20 minutes, we'd start cutting it. We would laugh at some of the ideas Mariah would come up with lyrically and go, 'That has to stay.'" He mentioned how the band would pull in studio staff, interns, friends hanging around, and people with Mariah to contribute background vocals and ad-libs—even if they could not sing.

== Release and promotion ==
The album was released on September 5, 1995. "Malibu" was released as the first single and was serviced to alternative rock radio stations, where it fared poorly. Additionally, the music video was played on JBTV and Rage only on the week ending September 9, 1995. Hilary Lerner, then EVP of radio promotion at 550 Records said,

"We were working the records to alternative radio, but they didn't think it was alternative. The first single did not do well. But we still put out another. Clearly, it was a 'priority list project.'"

However, Chappelle disagreed: "Sony just wanted it to go away. Maybe they felt like it was a threat to the pop sales. Maybe they felt like it would confuse people. It was out there for a minute, but I think it was too much for Sony. It [was] too different from Mariah, the pop star." In 2020, after Carey revealed information on the album, Pitchfork reported that copies "soon garnered up to $800 on Amazon and eBay". Outside of physical copies, the album is not available on streaming services.

== Cover ==
The cover artwork was created by Sony Music's art department, based on concept art from Carey. Carey said in her memoir, "I wrote the title with pink lipstick over a Polaroid picture Tommy had taken of a giant dead cockroach in Italy."

== Label response ==
Carey's label at the time, Sony Music Entertainment, was not happy with her choice of music and "refused to release the record with Carey's vocals as the lead". Afanasieff said that "Sony renamed the band from Eel Tree to Chick, and made Carey—who co-wrote every song except for the cover of Cheap Trick's "Surrender"—sanitize many of the more explicit lyrics". He added that this is what prompted them to bring Chick in to record the songs with her vocals. Pitchfork writer, Rafael Canton, reiterated Afanasieff by agreeing that Sony "saw the album as too much of a deviation from [Carey's] carefully crafted pop image". Carey herself noted on Sony's response to removing her vocals from the album stating in 2020 that,

"I got kind of in trouble for making this album—the alternative album—because back then, everything was super-controlled by the powers that be. I never really was like, 'Oh, we're going to release it' but then I was like, I should release it. I should do it under an alias. Let people discover it and whatever, but that got squashed."

Canton noted that the album was "a sign of what Carey could do without the interference of executives" and her then-husband and CEO of Sony Music, Tommy Mottola. He said that she would eventually "take more control of her creative direction, spearheading albums like her 2005 comeback, The Emancipation of Mimi".

== Live performances ==
At the 2026 MusiCares Person of the Year ceremony where Carey was being honored, Taylor Momsen from The Pretty Reckless and the Foo Fighters teamed up to perform two songs from Someone's Ugly Daughter. The performances included renditions of "Hermit" and "Love Is a Scam". Pat Smear, reportedly a Carey superfan, reached out to Momsen about collaborating on the performance. Momsen further commented on the album:

"She should [rerelease it]. Any artist who’s proud of something they’ve made should see the light of day at some point. The world would really love it. I hope that she does. Maybe now that we’ve debuted the songs and gotten them a little more visibility, it’ll encourage her team to finally pull the trigger."

== Critical reception ==
Professional ratings
Review scores
Source	Rating
Northwest Herald	3.5/5 stars
Press & Sun-Bulletin	B+

Due to the Sony's dissatisfaction with the album and the singles' poor performance on radio, critical reaction in the US was muted. Nevertheless, in a review for the song "Malibu", Larry Flick of Billboard wrote,

"Pop culture fanatics will dig this one, as Chick kicks out lyrical nods to Melrose Place, Marsha Brady, and yes, even Malibu Ken. A snotty female vocal weaves a melody through several retro references, as glitchy guitars grind along. At least it's cooler than Barbie."

== Track listing ==
No.	Title	Writer(s)	Length
1.	"Joe"	Clarissa Dane-Davidson; D. Sue; W. Vlad; W. Chester	4:26
2.	"Love Is a Scam"	Clarissa Dane-Davidson; D. Sue; W. Vlad	3:04
3.	"Violent"	Clarissa Dane-Davidson; D. Sue; W. Vlad	3:03
4.	"Malibu"	Clarissa Dane-Davidson; D. Sue; W. Vlad; W. Chester	2:46
5.	"Demented"	Clarissa Dane-Davidson; D. Sue; W. Vlad	3:33
6.	"Freak"	Clarissa Dane-Davidson; D. Sue; W. Vlad; W. Chester	2:18
7.	"Agony"	Clarissa Dane-Davidson; D. Sue; W. Vlad	3:58
8.	"Surrender" (Cheap Trick cover)	Rick Nielsen	4:15
9.	"Hermit"	Clarissa Dane-Davidson; D. Sue; W. Vlad	2:43
10.	"Prom Queen"	Clarissa Dane-Davidson; D. Sue; W. Vlad	3:39
11.	"Stork: Orphan in My Room"	Clarissa Dane-Davidson; D. Sue; W. Vlad	2:41
Total length:			36:26

== Personnel ==
Adapted from the Someone's Ugly Daughter liner notes.

- Chick – production, art direction
- Clarissa Dane-Davidson – lead vocals, writing (tracks 1–7, 9–11)
- D. Sue – background vocals, writing (tracks 1–7, 9–11)
- W. Vlad – drums, writing (tracks 1–7, 9–11)
- W. Chester – guitar, writing (tracks 1, 4, 6)
- Mann – bass
- M. Kim – background vocals
- Dana Jon Chappelle – engineering
- Jay Healy – engineering, mixing
- Andy Smith – assistant engineering
- Kurt Lundvall – assistant engineering
- Glen Marchese – assistant engineering (track 2)
- Bob Ludwig – mastering
- Chris Austopchuk – art direction
- Tracy Boychuk – design

Notes

- Aside from Clarissa Dane and technical staff, those involved in the project used pseudonyms, meaning the identities of those credited are not known.
- W. Vlad is Walter Afanasieff, who was Carey's main collaborator at the time of the project's recording. W. is the first initial of his professional name and Vladimir is his birth name.
- D. Sue is believed to be Carey, due to the name being credited as both a backing vocalist and as a writer on every original track, consistent with Carey's comments on the creation of the project. Carey is also believed to be credited on the project as Chick, the name listed as being responsible for the album's production and art direction, consistent with Carey's comments on the creation of the record.
- W. Chester is Gary Cirimelli. The name is a pun on Westchester County, the location of Carey's home at the time.
