= Shinan Govani =

Canadian society columnist

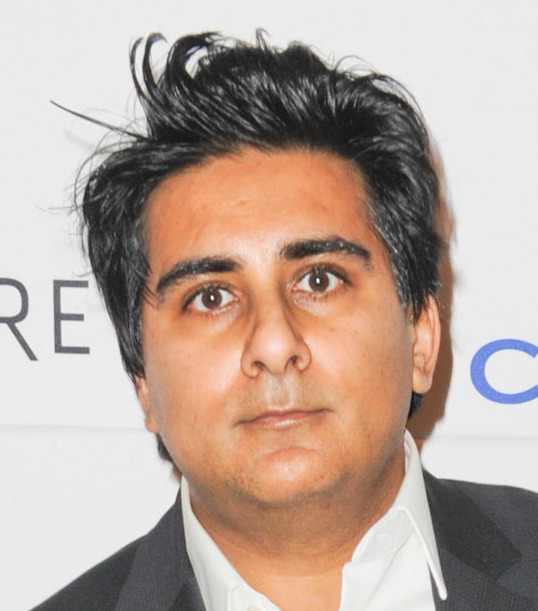
- Born: 1972 (age 53–54)
- Education: University of Toronto
- Occupation: Writer
- Writing career
- Language: English
- Genres: Society reporting; Fiction
- Notable work: Boldface Names

Shinan Govani is a society columnist in Canada.

== Career ==
Govani graduated from the University of Toronto with a degree in political science. From 2001 to 2013 Govani wrote a society column for Canada’s National Post. Karen Burshtein of Condé Nast Traveler called Govani's column "the first thing potentates and plebs turn to—and where they hope to see their own names in boldface."

In 2009 Harper Collins published Govani's novel Boldface Names. Carla Lucchetta of The Globe and Mail described Boldface Names as "frothy and fun" but also wished that Govani would put "his obviously creative brain to more imaginative literary use." Morley Walker of the Winnipeg Free Press wrote that Boldface Names "offers incontrovertible proof of an author who can neither write nor think."

From 2014 to 2016 Govani wrote the "On the Town with Shinan" column for Hello! Canada. His byline has also appeared in Vanity Fair and The Daily Beast. In 2017 he hosted the closing night party of the rooftop bar inside Toronto's Park Hyatt Hotel. Govani is currently a columnist for the Toronto Star.

Govani describes himself as a "pop culture decoder" and "chief mythology-maker." Poet Mark Abley has described Govani's writing as "the language of hype, dead at the heart."

== Personal life ==
Govani was born in Uganda and came to Canada as a refugee.
