= Bobby Finger =

American journalist, author, podcaster and pop culture critic

- Born: April 1986 (age 40); Texas
- Education: University of Texas at Austin
- Occupations: Podcaster; Journalist; Music Producer; Author
- Years active: 2015–present

Robert "Bobby" Finger (born April 22, 1986) is an American journalist, author, podcaster, and pop culture critic, best known as the co-creator and host of the Who? Weekly podcast alongside friend and fellow writer Lindsey Weber. He previously worked as a regular contributing writer for the US culture website Jezebel from 2015 until 2018.

== Career ==
Finger graduated from the University of Texas at Austin in 2008. After moving to New York City, he worked as a copywriter at an advertising agency before transitioning into becoming a full-time pop culture writer and podcaster in 2015.

Finger's byline has appeared in outlets including New York, The New York Times, and Vanity Fair. Finger has also appeared as a guest on podcasts including Blank Check with Griffin and David, It's Been a Minute with Sam Sanders, and Little Gold Men.

In 2016, Finger, alongside Lindsey Weber, started the podcast Who? Weekly, based on a newsletter and focused on B-list celebrities. The podcast quickly became popular, amassing a group of fans known as 'Wholigans'. The podcast has received a positive critical response and celebrity fans including Lena Dunham and Lea DeLaria. In 2019, Vulture named the show one of the "10 Essential Conversation Podcasts that Shaped the Genre." The show also received national attention in 2017 after fans identified then-White House Press Secretary Sean Spicer's open account on the mobile payment service Venmo, which led to trolling.

In 2017, Finger published a series of articles on Jezebel critically reviewing episodes of Megyn Kelly Today, entitled "Megyn Kelly Today, Today," which led to show host Megyn Kelly inviting Finger to appear as a guest on the show. Business Insider called the segment "hilariously awkward."

In 2019, Finger began hosting I'm Obsessed With This, a podcast reviewing new Netflix programming.

In 2022, Finger's debut novel The Old Place was published by Penguin Random House. "A bighearted and moving debut about a wry retired schoolteacher whose decade-old secret threatens to come to light and send shockwaves through her small Texas town.". The Old Place was selected by Vanity Fair as one of the best books of the year in 2022.

His second novel, Four Squares, was published in 2024.

== Personal life ==
Finger is from Texas and lives in Brooklyn, New York City. He married Josh Fjelstad, co-host of the Pokémon podcast Exp. Share, in 2018.
