= Throw shade =

Term for insulting a person

The expressions "throw shade", "throwing shade", or simply "shade", are slang terms for a certain type of insult, often nonverbal. Journalist Anna Holmes called shade "the art of the sidelong insult". Merriam-Webster defines it as "subtle, sneering expression of contempt for or disgust with someone—sometimes verbal, and sometimes not".

== History ==
The term can be found in Jane Austen's novel Mansfield Park (1814). Young Edmund Bertram is displeased with a dinner guest's disparagement of the uncle who took her in: "With such warm feelings and lively spirits it must be difficult to do justice to her affection for Mrs. Crawford, without throwing a shade on the Admiral."

According to gender studies scholar John C. Hawley, the expression "throwing shade" was used in the 1980s by New York City's working-class in the "ballroom and vogue culture". He writes that it refers to "the processes of a publicly performed dissimulation that aims either to protect oneself from ridicule or to verbally or psychologically attack others in a haughty or derogatory manner."

== Later use ==
The first major use of "shade" that introduced the slang to the greater public was in Jennie Livingston's documentary film, Paris Is Burning (1990), about the mid-1980s drag scene in Manhattan. In the documentary, one of the drag queens, Dorian Corey, explains that shade derives from "reading", the "real art form of insults". Shade is a developed form of reading: "Shade is, I don't tell you you're ugly. But I don't have to tell you, because you know you're ugly. And that's shade."

Willi Ninja, who also appeared in Paris Is Burning, described "shade" in 1994 as a "nonverbal response to verbal or nonverbal abuse. Shade is about using certain mannerisms in battle. If you said something nasty to me, I would just turn on you, and give you a look like: 'Bitch please, you're not even worth my time, go on.' ... It's like watching Joan Collins going against Linda Evans on Dynasty. ... Or when George Bush ran against Bill Clinton, they were throwing shade. Who got the bigger shade? Bush did because Clinton won." A New York Times letter to the editor in 1993 criticized the newspaper for commenting on Bill Clinton's hair: "The Sunday Stylers are the last people I'd expect to throw shade on President Bill's hair pursuits."

According to E. Patrick Johnson, to throw shade is to ignore someone: "If a shade thrower wishes to acknowledge the presence of the third party, he or she might roll his or her eyes and neck while poking out his or her lips. People throw shade if they do not like a particular person or if that person has dissed them in the past. ... In the playful mode, however, a person may throw shade at a person with whom he or she is a best friend."

The expression was further popularized by the American reality television series RuPaul's Drag Race, which premiered in 2009. In 2015, Anna Holmes of The New York Times Magazine wrote:

Shade can take many forms—a hard, deep look that could be either aggressive or searching, a compliment that could be interpreted as the opposite of one. E. Patrick Johnson, who teaches performance studies and African-American studies at Northwestern University, and who has written about the tradition of insults in the gay and black communities, explains: "If someone walks into a room with a hideous dress, but you don't want to say it's hideous, you might say, 'Oooh ... look at you!'" At its most refined, shade should have an element of plausible deniability, so that the shade-thrower can pretend that he or she didn't actually mean to behave with incivility, making it all the more delicious.

== See also ==
- LGBT slang
- List of LGBT slang terms
- RuPaul
- Yas (slang)
